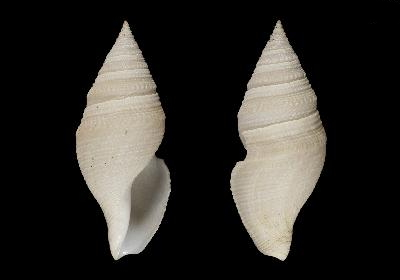
- Shell of Bathytoma paratractoides (holotype in the MNHN, Paris)

Scientific classification
- Kingdom: Animalia
- Phylum: Mollusca
- Class: Gastropoda
- Subclass: Caenogastropoda
- Order: Neogastropoda
- Superfamily: Conoidea
- Family: Borsoniidae
- Genus: Bathytoma
- Species: B. paratractoides

Binomial name
- Bathytoma paratractoides Puillandre, Sysoev, Olivera, Couloux & Bouchet, 2010

= Bathytoma paratractoides =

Species of gastropod

Bathytoma paratractoides is a species of sea snail, a marine gastropod mollusk in the family Borsoniidae.

== Distribution ==
This marine species occurs in the Southwestern Pacific off the Solomon Islands.

== Description ==
The length of this species varies between 47 mm and 52 mm. This species is very similar to Bathytoma atractoides (Watson, 1881) from the Philippines, mainly distinguished by their relative diameter/length ratio.
