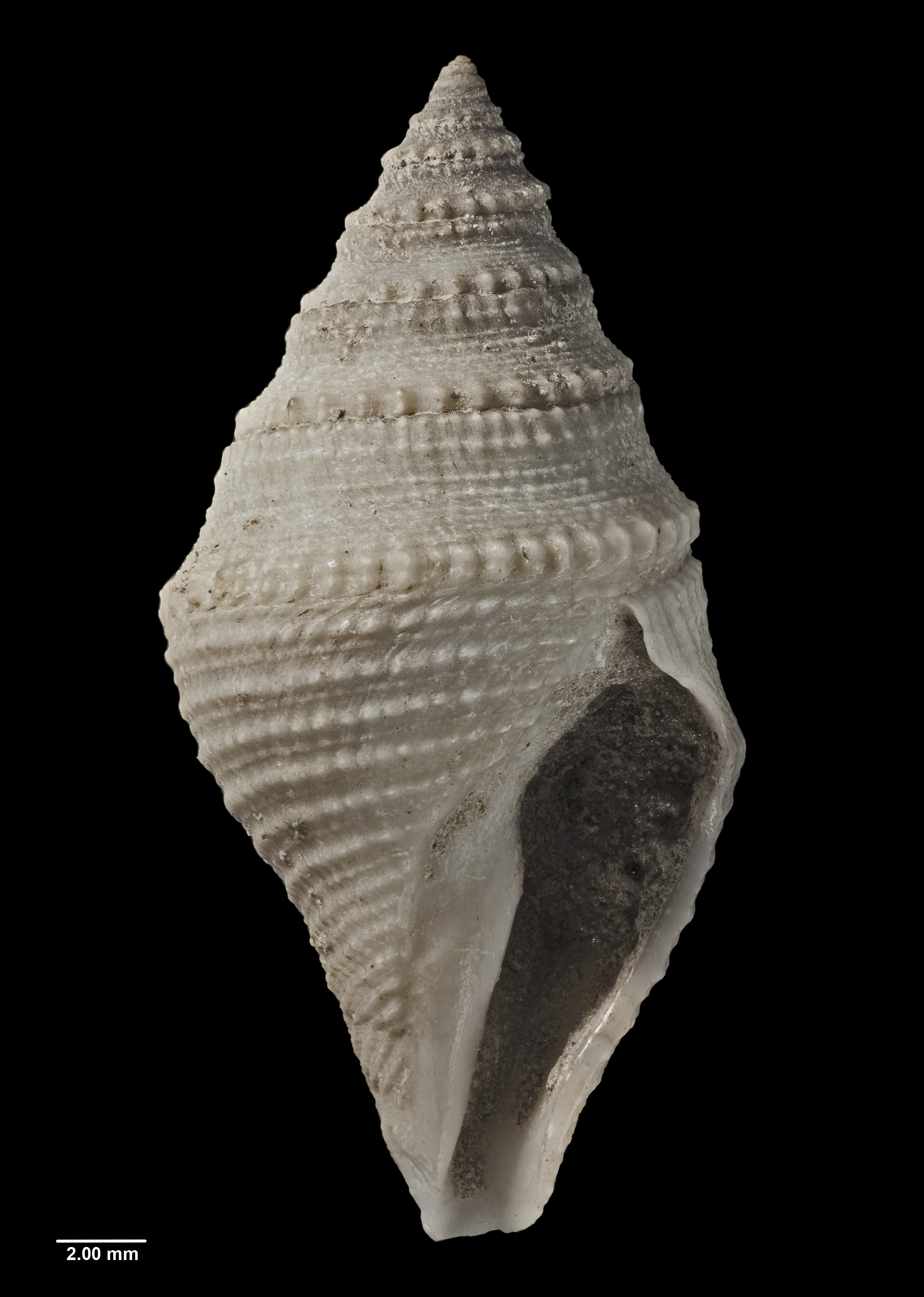
- Holotype from Auckland War Memorial Museum

Scientific classification
- Kingdom: Animalia
- Phylum: Mollusca
- Class: Gastropoda
- Subclass: Caenogastropoda
- Order: Neogastropoda
- Family: Borsoniidae
- Genus: Bathytoma
- Species: †B. mitchelsoni

Binomial name
- †Bathytoma mitchelsoni A. W. B. Powell, 1935

Synonyms
- Bathytoma (Bathytoma) mitchelsoni A. W. B. Powell, 1935

= Bathytoma mitchelsoni =

Bathytoma mitchelsoni Temporal range: early Miocene

Extinct species of gastropod

Bathytoma mitchelsoni is an extinct species of sea snail, a marine gastropod mollusc in the family Borsoniidae. A species that lived on the bathyal sea floor, fossils of the species date to the early Miocene strata of the west coast of the Auckland Region, New Zealand.

== Description ==
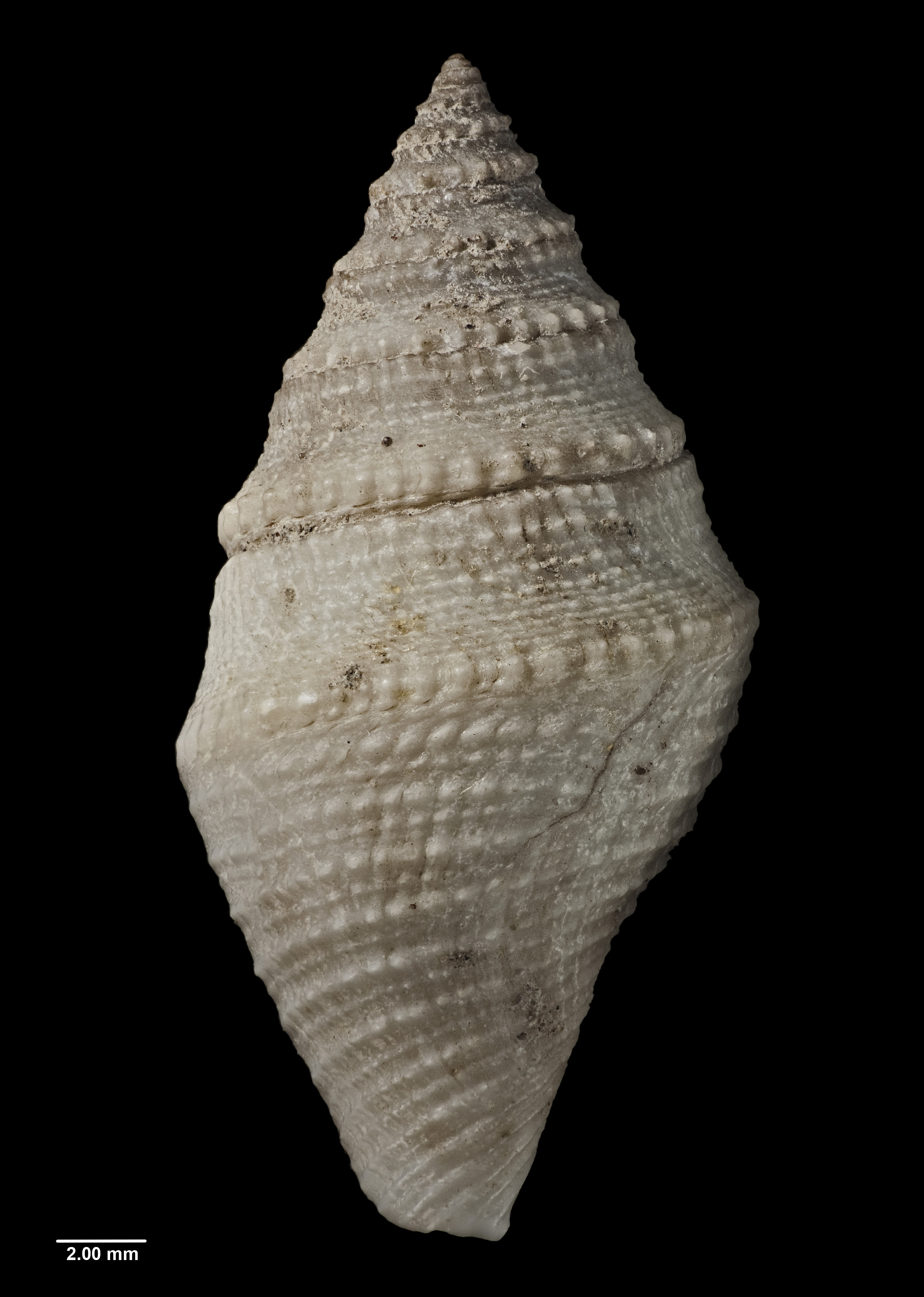
Reverse view of holotype

In the original description, Powell described the species as follows:

Shell of moderate size, fusiform, solid, spire a little less than height of aperture plus canal. Whorls keeled very low, almost at lower suture. There are ten whorls, including a small smooth conical protoconch of 2 3/4 whorls. Spire whorls with a fiat subsutural band bearing two spiral threads, which are broken up into a close series of rounded gemmules. Below this is a strongly concave shoulder extending to the keel, which is almost at the lower suture, being separated from it only by a deep groove. The keel also is made up of two spiral gemmate threads, which are so close together that the upper and lower opposed gemmules appear to merge as larger oval nodules in a single peripheral series. There are thirty-four of these nodules on the keel of the last whorl. On the concave shoulder, between the upper sutural band and the lower keel there are from four to seven fine spiral threads which are rendered gemmulate by close radial growth lines. On the base from below the keel there are twelve rather strong spiral cords, and in each interspace a weak spiral thread, the whole rendered gemmulate by the radial growth lines. Aperture narrow, produced below into a short, straight and wide canal. Outer lip with a deep, rather narrow sinus at the keel. Inner lip and columella smooth and polished, slightly excavated over parietal wall.

The holotype of the species measures 28 mm (1.1 in) in length and has a diameter of 13.5 mm (0.53 in). It can be differentiated from other New Zealand members of Bathytoma due to having finely gemmulate periphery and basal spirals, and from B. haasti due to B. mitchelsoni having a significantly lower keel that almost touches the lower suture, and due to its finer and more numerous gemmules.

== Taxonomy ==
The species was first described by A. W. B. Powell in 1935, naming the species after politician Edwin Mitchelson, on whose property the holotype was discovered. The holotype was collected at an unknown date prior to 1935 from between Powell Bay and Bartrum Bay, 2 km (1.2 mi) south of Muriwai, Auckland Region (then more commonly known as Motutara), and is held in the collections of Auckland War Memorial Museum.

== Distribution and habitat ==
This extinct marine species occurs in early Miocene strata of the Nihotupu Formation of New Zealand, on the west coast of the Waitākere Ranges of the Auckland Region, New Zealand. The species lived in a bathyal habitat. The Powell Bay site deposits of the Nihotupu Formation in the western Waitākere Ranges are mid-bathyal 800–2,000 m (2,600–6,600 ft), while the Shaw Road quarry in the eastern Waitākere Ranges where B. mitchelsoni has also been found is an area of sea-floor deposits from the bathyal and abyssal zones, which likely had temperatures that fluctuated between 4-10°C.
