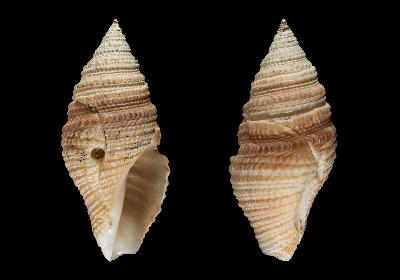
- Shell of Bathytoma punicea (holotype in the MNHN, Paris)

Scientific classification
- Kingdom: Animalia
- Phylum: Mollusca
- Class: Gastropoda
- Subclass: Caenogastropoda
- Order: Neogastropoda
- Superfamily: Conoidea
- Family: Borsoniidae
- Genus: Bathytoma
- Species: B. punicea

Binomial name
- Bathytoma punicea Puillandre, Sysoev, Olivera, Couloux & Bouchet, 2010

= Bathytoma punicea =

Species of gastropod

Bathytoma punicea is a species of sea snail, a marine gastropod mollusk in the family Borsoniidae. It differs from related species for its sharper sculpture and prominent nodules. The shell features a sharp keel, prominent tubercles, a deep anal sinus, and a somewhat swollen columella.

== Distribution ==
This marine species occurs in the Southwestern Pacific off the Solomon Islands. While this species is restricted to the Solomon Islands, its genus Bathytoma is otherwise widespread in deep waters of the Indo-Pacific.

== Description ==
The height of this species attains 43 mm. Its shell is biconical or fusiform. It is coarse, with a distinct keel at the periphery. The ground color of the shell is whitish to yellowish-brown. It is long and narrow, with a sharp outer lip and a deep, broad anal sinus. Its columella is slightly swollen.

It can be distinguished from similar species like Bathytoma engonia because of its sharper keel, more prominent tubercles, and generally coarser surface texture.
