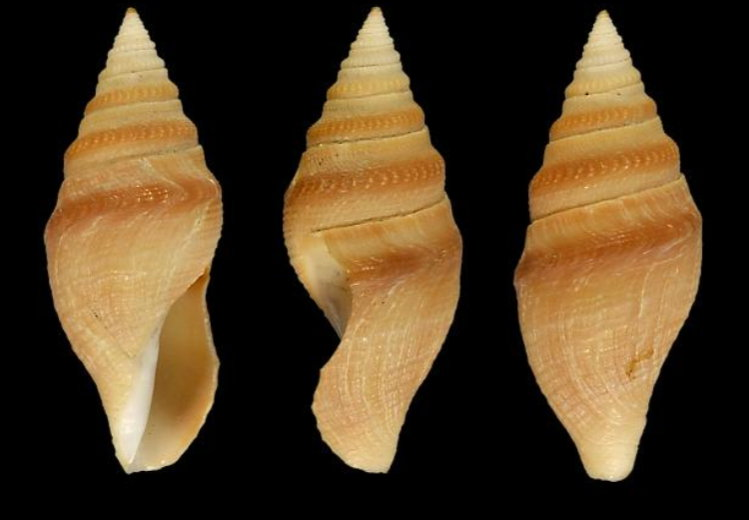
- Shell of Bathytoma viabrunnea (syntype at the Smithsonian Institution)

Scientific classification
- Kingdom: Animalia
- Phylum: Mollusca
- Class: Gastropoda
- Subclass: Caenogastropoda
- Order: Neogastropoda
- Superfamily: Conoidea
- Family: Borsoniidae
- Genus: Bathytoma
- Species: B. viabrunnea

Binomial name
- Bathytoma viabrunnea (Dall, 1889)

Synonyms
- Genota (Dolichotoma) brunnea Dall, 1889 (original combination); Pleurotoma viabrunnea Dall, 1889; Pleurotoma (Genota) viabrunnea Dall, 1889

= Bathytoma viabrunnea =

Species of gastropod

Bathytoma viabrunnea, common name the brown-banded turrid, is a species of sea snail, a marine gastropod mollusc in the family Borsoniidae.

== Description ==
The size of an adult shell varies between 40 mm and 70 mm. Its diameter is 16.5 mm.

=== Original description ===
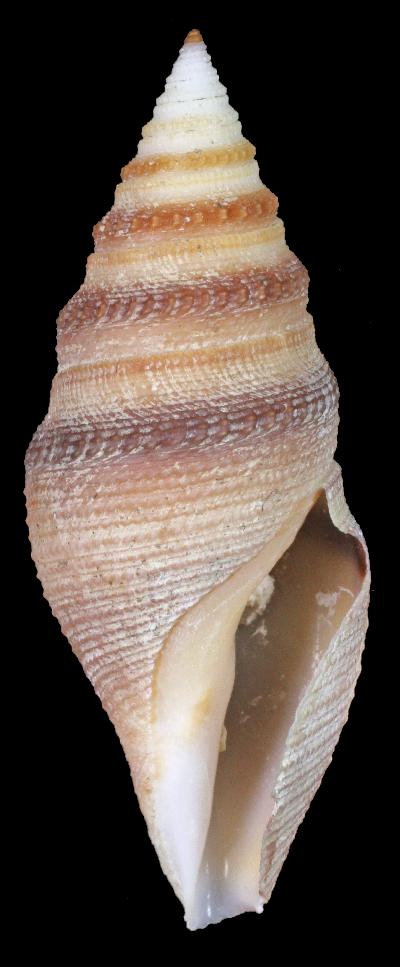
Bathytoma viabrunnea (specimen in MNHN, Paris)

The solid shell has a fusiform shape. It has a smooth, brown, two-and-a-half-whorled vitreous nucleus. The body whorl has semilunar riblets. And the teleoconch contains eight slightly turreted whorls. The short spire is conical, rather pointed with the early whorls delicately sculptured, the last two rather rude. The aperture is longer than half the shell. The transverse sculpture in the earlier whorls (which are pure white) consists of rather crowded flutings depending transversely forward from the sutural margin for a third of the width of the (visible) whorl, which then swells outward, marked by strong growth lines, to a series of peripheral angular nodulations which mark the course of the anal fasciole. On the fourth, fifth, and sixth whorls, counting from the nucleus, the flutings are more regular and elegant than in the earlier or subsequent turns, on the fifth and sixth they, as well as the growth lines, are elegantly granulose or marked with small round nodes, the resultant of transverse and spiral sculpture. The peripheral nodulations also become more transverse and divided into three smaller nodules each, from the same cause; on the seventh and eighth whorls the lines of growth become more rude, the flutings and nodulation gradually vanish, and the sculpture is reduced to obscure spiral ridges, finer and more uniform on and behind the fasciole, and coarser, with a certain alternation of larger and smaller in size, before the fasciole. The last three and a half whorls take on a warm brownish tint, the fasciole being a still darker and somewhat livid madder brown. The later spiral ridges are also often somewhat darker than their interspaces. The aperture is narrow. The siphonal canal is short, broad, and slightly recurved. The thin outer lip is produced in advance of the sinus. It is simple and sharp. The body is polished and slightly excavated. The columella is slightly twisted, swollen, white, smooth, attenuated in front, with no callus, as long as the canal. The suture is distinct, appressed. The posterior surface of the whorls behind the fasciole is somewhat concave.

The shell is closely allied to † Bathytoma cataphracta Brocchi 1814, of the Miocene of the Paris and Vienna Basins. Though the sculpture differs in detail, and the fossil is more turreted, beside being sharply strongly internally lirate, the Bathytoma viabrunnea may be regarded as the descendant of the fossil in a more or less direct line. The several varieties even, so beautifully figured by Hoernes in his monograph of the Vienna Tertiary mollusks, are reproduced in the recent form. Among the five specimens I have seen there is a variation as to the sculpture which would divide them into two groups, just as Brocchi originally divided his Murex cataphracta. One has the spiral sculpture elegantly alternated, a stout thread and a slender one, all over the body, and all the threads minutely and prettily granulated. The other has the spiral sculpture illdefined, sparser, rude, and obsolete, that on the base showing no granulations whatever.

Soft parts. The foot is double-edged in front, rounded at the corners and behind. It is nearly smooth, and like all the rest of the integument is yellowish white (in alcohol). The tentacles are rather long, cylindrical, stout, and not very pointed. The eyes are small, black, situated one third of the way from the base toward the tips of the tentacles. The verge is very large, recurved, flattened cylindrical, bluntly pointed; gills two, the lamellae rather short, the organs themselves rather long and of a dark greenish color. The operculum normally is as in Leucosyrinx, thin, horny, elongated, pointed at the anterior end, which is the nucleus. The scar of the attachment is large and curiously concentrically engraved, recalling the opercular scar in Purpura, though not rotary-concentric as that is.

== Distribution ==
This species occurs in the Caribbean Sea and the Gulf of Mexico.
