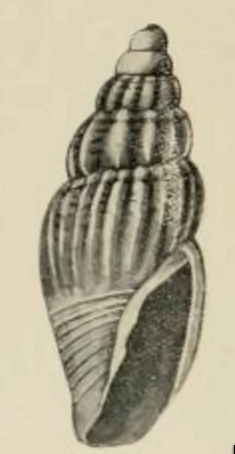
- Original drawing of a shell of Apaturris costifera

Scientific classification
- Kingdom: Animalia
- Phylum: Mollusca
- Class: Gastropoda
- Subclass: Caenogastropoda
- Order: Neogastropoda
- Superfamily: Conoidea
- Family: Borsoniidae
- Genus: Apaturris
- Species: A. costifera

Binomial name
- Apaturris costifera May, 1920

Synonyms
- Mitromorpha costifera (May, 1920); Mitromorpha (Mitrolumna) costifera (May, W.L., 1919)

= Apaturris costifera =

Species of gastropod

Apaturris costifera is a species of sea snail in the family Borsoniidae.

== Description ==
(Original description) The small shell is fusiform. It is white with a broad chestnut band on the centre of the body whorl. The 5½ whorls are rounded, the first two being quite smooth, the rest sculptured with strong, rounded axial ribs, fourteen on the penultimate, sixteen on the body whorl. They fade away a little below the periphery. The base is encircled by numerous fairly strong spiral lirae. The ribs are crossed by very fine, sharp spiral threads. The aperture is fairly large, pointed above, broad at the base, where it scarcely becomes a canal. The columella is excavate, bearing two low tubercles. The outer lip is rounded and simple.

Length, 4.5 mm; breadth, 2 mm

Habitat. Type, with five others from about 40 fathom;-East of Thouin Bay.

This species closely resembles Mitromorpha axicostata Verco 1909. It has, however, a narrower shell, with more rounded whorls, and the spiral lirae are much less strong. It has, too, a more bluntly rounded apex.

== Distribution ==
This marine species occurs in Australia off Tasmania.
