= Bathytoma tippetti =

Scientific classification
- Kingdom: Animalia
- Phylum: Mollusca
- Class: Gastropoda
- Subclass: Caenogastropoda
- Order: Neogastropoda
- Superfamily: Conoidea
- Family: Borsoniidae
- Genus: Bathytoma
- Species: B. tippetti

Binomial name
- Bathytoma tippetti Vera-Peláez, 2004

Species of gastropod

Bathytoma tippetti is a species of sea snail, a marine gastropod mollusk in the family Borsoniidae.

== Description ==
The size of an adult shell varies between 35 mm and 50 mm.

== Distribution ==
This marine species occurs off the Philippines.
