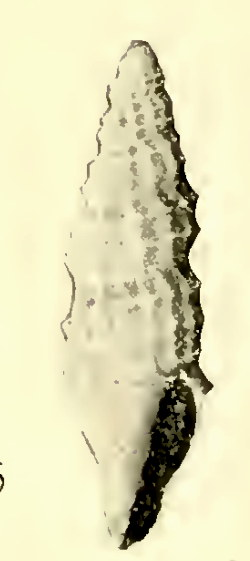
- Original image of a shell of Glyptaesopus phylira

Scientific classification
- Kingdom: Animalia
- Phylum: Mollusca
- Class: Gastropoda
- Subclass: Caenogastropoda
- Order: Neogastropoda
- Superfamily: Conoidea
- Family: Borsoniidae
- Genus: Glyptaesopus
- Species: G. phylira

Binomial name
- Glyptaesopus phylira (Dall, 1919)

Synonyms
- Nannodiella amyela Dall, W.H., 1919; Philbertia amyela Dall, 1919; Philbertia (Nannodiella) phylira Dall, 1919

= Glyptaesopus phylira =

Species of gastropod

Glyptaesopus phylira is a species of sea snail, a marine gastropod mollusk in the family Borsoniidae.

== Description ==
The size of an adult shell varies between 6 mm and 8 mm.

(Original description) The small, slender shell is thin, waxen white, with a narrow purple brown band in front of the suture in the later whorls. The columella and the siphonal canal are more or less similarly tinted. The protoconch is very small, rather blunt, with the latter part spirally threaded, of about one and a half whorls, followed by about six subsequent whorls. The spiral sculpture of (on the early whorls one, later two, and on the body whorl three) strong, rather widely separated threads which are prominently nodulous where they cross the ribs and on the spire are feeble in the interspaces; suture appressed, obscure, the anal fasciole inconspicuous behind the first row of nodules; on the base are 3 or 4 distant threads and on the siphonal canal a few feeble spirals. The axial sculpture (on the body whorl of about 15) consists of narrow sharp nearly vertical ribs with wider interspaces. The general surface between them shows more or less prominent incremental sculpture. The aperture is narrow. The anal sulcus is feeble. The outer lip is thin and smooth inside. The inner lip is smooth. The siphonal canal is distinct, short and straight.

== Distribution ==
This marine species occurs in the Pacific Ocean from Panama to Ecuador.
