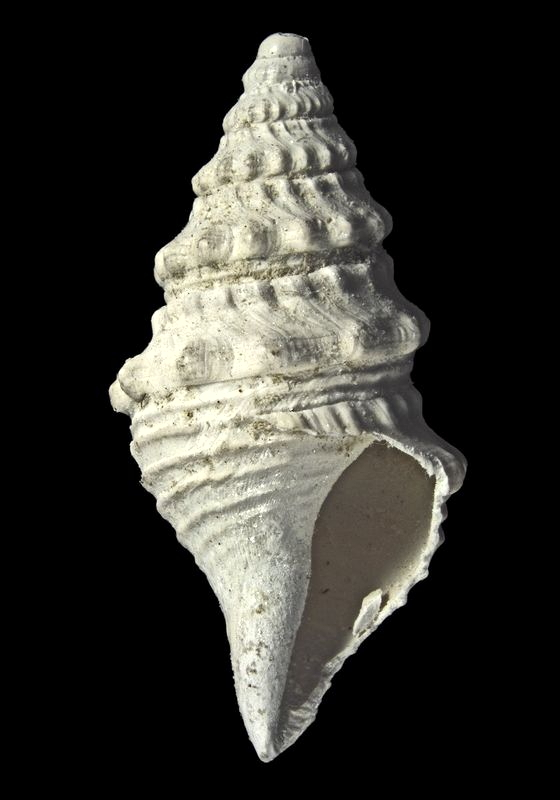
- Shell of Bathytoma murdochi (specimen at the Auckland War Memorial Museum)

Scientific classification
- Kingdom: Animalia
- Phylum: Mollusca
- Class: Gastropoda
- Subclass: Caenogastropoda
- Order: Neogastropoda
- Superfamily: Conoidea
- Family: Borsoniidae
- Genus: Bathytoma
- Species: B. murdochi

Binomial name
- Bathytoma murdochi Finlay, 1930

Synonyms
- Bathytoma murdochi murdochi (Finlay, 1930); Bathytoma (Micantapex) murdochi murdochi, Beu & Maxwell 1990; Micantapex finlayi Powell, 1940; Pleurotoma tuberculata Kirk 1882 (preoccupied, replaced by Pleurotoma (Hemipleurotoma) nodilirata Murdoch & Suter 1906); Pleurotoma (Hemipleurotoma) nodilirata Murdoch & Suter 1906 (also preoccupied; replaced by Bathytoma murdochi Finlay 1930)

= Bathytoma murdochi =

Species of gastropod

Bathytoma murdochi is a recent and fossil species of sea snail, a marine gastropod mollusk in the family Borsoniidae.

== Taxonomy ==
T. W. Kirk first described this shell from the Petane Pliocene (Trans. N.Z. Inst., vol. 14, p. 409; 1882) as Pleurotoma tuberculata; this name being preoccupied by Gray, Murdoch and Suter (idem., vol. 38, p. 284; 1906) substituted Pleurotoma (Hemipleurotoma) nodilirata as the species name. In the use of this combination they were forestalled by E. A. Smith, 1878 (Ann. Mag. Nat. Hist., dec. 4, vol. 19, p. 494) who described a Pleurotoma (Drillia) nodilirata from the Philippine Islands. The New Zealand shell is therefore renamed as above.

== Description ==
The height of the biconic shell varies between 23 mm and 27 mm.

(Original description) The shell is fusiform, with the spire making up about half the total length. It has eight whorls, each angled posteriorly. Along the upper angle of each whorl runs a row of tubercles, and a similar but smaller row of tubercles fills the suture. The shell is sculptured with spiral ribs; on the body whorl there are about eleven ribs, which are crossed by distinct lines of growth. The aperture is of moderate size, and the outer lip is angled posteriorly in line with the whorl profile.

== Distribution ==
This marine species occurs off New Zealand and Tasmania.
