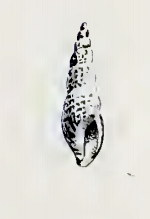
- Original image of Glyptaesopus oldroydi

Scientific classification
- Kingdom: Animalia
- Phylum: Mollusca
- Class: Gastropoda
- Subclass: Caenogastropoda
- Order: Neogastropoda
- Superfamily: Conoidea
- Family: Borsoniidae
- Genus: Glyptaesopus
- Species: G. oldroydi

Binomial name
- Glyptaesopus oldroydi (Arnold, 1903)

Synonyms
- Aesopus oldroydi Arnold, 1903; † Columbella (Aesopus) oldroydi Arnold, 1903 (original combination); Mangelia cetolacea Dall, 1908 (unnecessary nom. nov. for Columbella oldroydi Arnold, 1903, by Dall treated as a secondary homonym of Mangelia oldroydi Arnold, 1903)

= Glyptaesopus oldroydi =

Species of gastropod

Glyptaesopus oldroydi is a species of sea snail, a marine gastropod mollusk in the family Borsoniidae.

== Description ==
The size of an adult shell attains 9 mm, its width 2.6 mm.

(Original description) The small shell is slender and has a fusiform shape. The spire is elevated. The apex is rounded. The shell contains seven convex whorls. The first three whorls are smooth. The remainder, with exception of the body whorl, are ornamented with about eighteen transverse ridges and two or three rather indistinct spiral grooves, the whole giving a cancellate appearance to the surface. On the body whorl the transverse and spiral sculpture are of about equal prominence, the transverse sculpture being more subdued than on the whorls above it. The suture is quite deeply impressed. The aperture is narrow and elliptical. The columella is truncated anteriorly. The outer lip is smooth and thin. The inner lip is smooth.

== Distribution ==
This marine species occurs in the Pacific Ocean off Panama.

It was also found as a fossil from the Lower Pleistocene of San Pedro, California.
