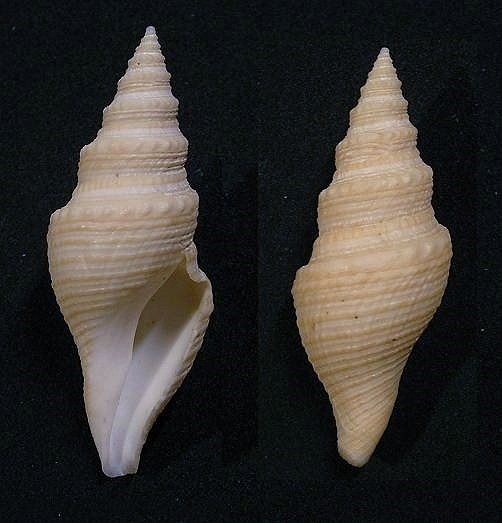

Scientific classification
- Kingdom: Animalia
- Phylum: Mollusca
- Class: Gastropoda
- Subclass: Caenogastropoda
- Order: Neogastropoda
- Superfamily: Conoidea
- Family: Borsoniidae
- Genus: Bathytoma
- Species: B. luehdorfi

Binomial name
- Bathytoma luehdorfi (Lischke, 1872)

Synonyms
- Genotia luhdorfi Lischke, 1872; Parabathytoma luhdorfi (Lischke, 1872); Pleurotoma luehdorfi Lischke, 1872

= Bathytoma luehdorfi =

Species of gastropod

Bathytoma luehdorfi is a species of sea snail, a marine gastropod mollusk in the family Borsoniidae.

== Description ==
The size of an adult shell varies between 30 mm and 70 mm. The shell is yellowish brown. The shoulder is concavely flattened, with a crenulated margin next the suture, and a tuberculate periphery. The surface shows spiral, white, distant sulci, and incremental striae. The white revolving sulci on the brownish surface are very distinctive in this species. The aperture is white.

== Distribution ==
This species occurs in the Pacific Ocean between Japan and the Philippines
