= Glyptaesopus proctorae =

Scientific classification
- Kingdom: Animalia
- Phylum: Mollusca
- Class: Gastropoda
- Subclass: Caenogastropoda
- Order: Neogastropoda
- Superfamily: Conoidea
- Family: Borsoniidae
- Genus: Glyptaesopus
- Species: G. proctorae

Binomial name
- Glyptaesopus proctorae (M. Smith, 1936)

Species of gastropod

Glyptaesopus proctorae is a species of sea snail, a marine gastropod mollusk in the family Borsoniidae.

== Description ==
The shell grows to a length of 9 mm.

== Distribution ==
This marine species occurs from the Florida Keys to the Bahamas; in the Gulf of Mexico.

This species was originally only known as a fossil from the Pliocene of Florida.
