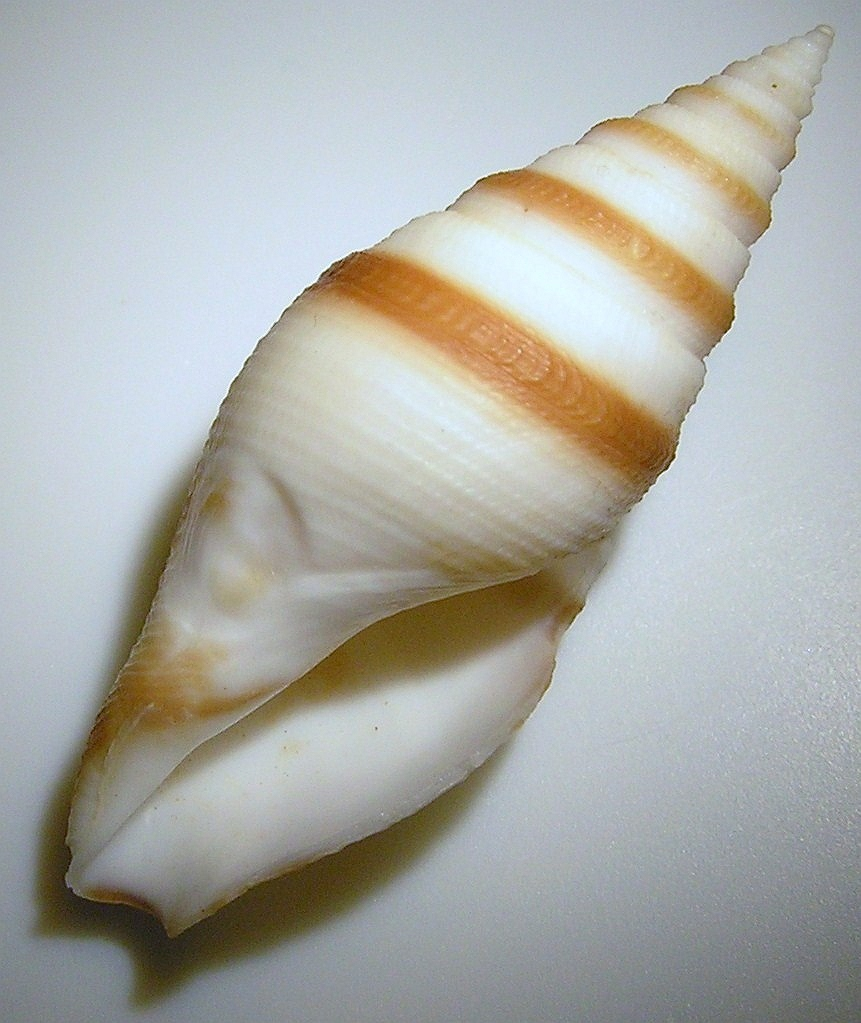

Scientific classification
- Kingdom: Animalia
- Phylum: Mollusca
- Class: Gastropoda
- Subclass: Caenogastropoda
- Order: Neogastropoda
- Superfamily: Conoidea
- Family: Borsoniidae
- Genus: Bathytoma
- Species: B. boholica

Binomial name
- Bathytoma boholica Parth, 1994

= Bathytoma boholica =

Species of gastropod

Bathytoma boholica is a species of sea snail, a marine gastropod mollusk in the family Borsoniidae.

== Distribution ==
This species occurs off the Philippines.

== Description ==
The length of the shell varies between 40 mm and 70 mm. It is spiral shaped with brown stripes. Not much is known about the snail.
