= Bathytoma hedlandensis =

Scientific classification
- Kingdom: Animalia
- Phylum: Mollusca
- Class: Gastropoda
- Subclass: Caenogastropoda
- Order: Neogastropoda
- Superfamily: Conoidea
- Family: Borsoniidae
- Genus: Bathytoma
- Species: B. hedlandensis

Binomial name
- Bathytoma hedlandensis Tippett & Kosuge, 1994

Species of gastropod

Bathytoma hedlandensis is a species of sea snail, a marine gastropod mollusk in the family Borsoniidae.

== Description ==
The shell reaches a length of 45 mm.

== Distribution ==
This marine species occurs off Port Hedland, Australia.
