= Bathytoma tuckeri =

Scientific classification
- Kingdom: Animalia
- Phylum: Mollusca
- Class: Gastropoda
- Subclass: Caenogastropoda
- Order: Neogastropoda
- Superfamily: Conoidea
- Family: Borsoniidae
- Genus: Bathytoma
- Species: B. tuckeri

Binomial name
- Bathytoma tuckeri Vera-Peláez, 2004

Species of gastropod

Bathytoma tuckeri is a species of sea snail, a marine gastropod mollusk in the family Borsoniidae.
