= Belaturricula dissimilis =

Scientific classification
- Kingdom: Animalia
- Phylum: Mollusca
- Class: Gastropoda
- Subclass: Caenogastropoda
- Order: Neogastropoda
- Superfamily: Conoidea
- Family: Borsoniidae
- Genus: Belaturricula
- Species: B. dissimilis

Binomial name
- Belaturricula dissimilis (Watson, 1886)

Synonyms
- Pleurotoma dissimilis Watson, 1886

Species of gastropod

Belaturricula dissimilis is a species of sea snail, a marine gastropod mollusk in the family Borsoniidae.

== Distribution ==
This marine species occurs along the Philippines.
