= Bathytoma bartrumi =

Scientific classification
- Kingdom: Animalia
- Phylum: Mollusca
- Class: Gastropoda
- Subclass: Caenogastropoda
- Order: Neogastropoda
- Superfamily: Conoidea
- Family: Borsoniidae
- Genus: Bathytoma
- Species: B. bartrumi

Binomial name
- Bathytoma bartrumi Laws, 1939

Extinct species of gastropod

Bathytoma bartrumi is an extinct species of shallow marine sea snail in the family Borsoniidae. The species B. bartrumi was discovered in 1939 by Laws.

== Distribution ==
Bathytoma bartrumi was endemic to the island country of New Zealand in sea weir and shallow sea environments.

== Description ==
The height of the shell varies between 35 millimeters and 60 millimeters. Adults of the species Bathytoma bartrumi made locomotion by using their mucus-mediated slips. Bathytoma bartumi also had a body symmetry which was dextrally coiled.
