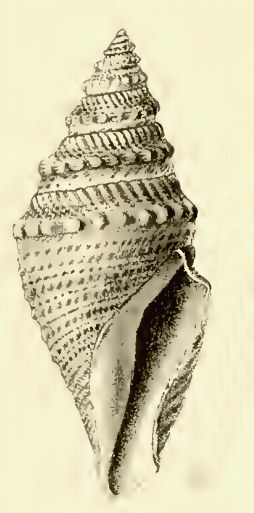
- Original drawing of Bathytoma fissa

Scientific classification
- Kingdom: Animalia
- Phylum: Mollusca
- Class: Gastropoda
- Subclass: Caenogastropoda
- Order: Neogastropoda
- Superfamily: Conoidea
- Family: Borsoniidae
- Genus: Bathytoma
- Species: B. fissa

Binomial name
- Bathytoma fissa (Martens, 1901)

Synonyms
- Genota (Dolichotoma) fissa Martens, 1901 (original combination); Parabathytoma fissa (Martens, E.C. von, 1901); Pleurotoma fissa Martens, 1901

= Bathytoma fissa =

Species of gastropod

Bathytoma fissa is a species of sea snail, a marine gastropod mollusk in the family Borsoniidae.

== Description ==
The length of the shell attains 32 mm. The white, biconical shell is multigranulated. The suture has a narrow split. The shell contains 9 whorls; the first two smooth and globular, with the following regularly increasing. Below the suture there are numerous, oblique, small plicae. The keel is nodulose and the granulose cingula are alternately smaller sculpted. The last base tapers gradually. The outer lip is thin. The edge of the rectilinear columella is subcallose. The keel is on the 3rd to 7th whorl closer to the bottom than the top. On the penultimate whorl it is approximately in the middle between the two.

== Distribution ==
This species occurs in the Indian Ocean off Somalia.
