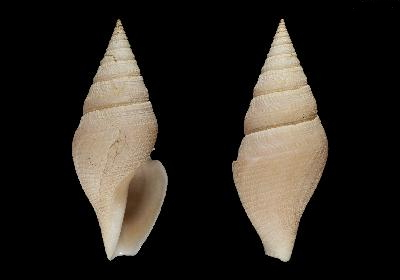
- Shell of Bathytoma carnicolor (holotype in the MNHN, Paris)

Scientific classification
- Kingdom: Animalia
- Phylum: Mollusca
- Class: Gastropoda
- Subclass: Caenogastropoda
- Order: Neogastropoda
- Superfamily: Conoidea
- Family: Borsoniidae
- Genus: Bathytoma
- Species: B. carnicolor

Binomial name
- Bathytoma carnicolor Puillandre, Sysoev, Olivera, Couloux & Bouchet, 2010

= Bathytoma carnicolor =

Species of gastropod

Bathytoma carnicolor is a species of sea snail, a marine gastropod mollusk of the family Borsoniidae.

== Distribution ==
Bathytoma carnicolor occurs in the Southwestern Pacific off the Solomon Islands, Vanuatu and Papua New Guinea.

== Description ==
The height of this marine species attains around 60 mm on average.
