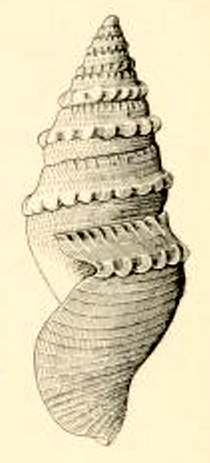
- Original drawing of a shell of Bathytoma agnata

Scientific classification
- Kingdom: Animalia
- Phylum: Mollusca
- Class: Gastropoda
- Subclass: Caenogastropoda
- Order: Neogastropoda
- Superfamily: Conoidea
- Family: Borsoniidae
- Genus: Bathytoma
- Species: B. agnata

Binomial name
- Bathytoma agnata Hedley & Petterd, 1906

Synonyms
- Bathytoma (Micantapex) agnata Hedley & Petterd, 1906; Micantapex agnata Hedley & Petterd, 1906

= Bathytoma agnata =

Species of gastropod

Bathytoma agnata is a species of sea snail, a marine gastropod mollusk in the family Borsoniidae.

== Description ==
The size of an adult varies between 17 mm and 38 mm.

(Original description) The solid shell is fusiform and biconical. Each spire whorl is prominently angled at its centre by a tuberculate keel. In the series before us the proportion of length to breadth varies considerably. The shell has eight whorls, including a protoconch of a whorl and a half. The ground colour of the shell is pale cream with an evanescent purple tinge in the aperture.

Sculpture : the suture is slightly puckered by small radiating folds which run out before reaching halfway to the keel. Along the keel are prominent wide spaced tubercles, numbering on the penultimate about seventeen, each truncated in front and sloping at the back to the base of its predecessor. Behind the aperture these sometimes degenerate into crowded imbricate scales. Below the keel the radial sculpture is resumed at indistinct forwardly curved riblets. Fine raised spiral threads extend from the tip of the canal to the protoconch. In the hollow supra-carinal shelf they are small and close together. Below the keel, amounting on the body whorl to about forty, they are wider spaced, often alternating in size and tend to be knotted by the radials. The protoconch is smooth and very glossy, dome shaped, a whorl and a half, ending with a sinus. The aperture is narrow and perpendicular. The outer lip is very deeply insinuate at the keel, then sweeping forward in a full curve. The columella is broad, heavily calloused, excavate above, swollen and twisted below.

== Distribution ==
This marine species is endemic to Australia and occurs off Queensland and New South Wales. Several specimens were found at two hundred and fifty fathoms.
