= Belaturricula ergata =

Scientific classification
- Kingdom: Animalia
- Phylum: Mollusca
- Class: Gastropoda
- Subclass: Caenogastropoda
- Order: Neogastropoda
- Superfamily: Conoidea
- Family: Borsoniidae
- Genus: Belaturricula
- Species: B. ergata

Binomial name
- Belaturricula ergata (Hedley, 1916)

Synonyms
- Pontiothauma ergata Hedley, 1916

Species of gastropod

Belaturricula ergata is a species of sea snail, a marine gastropod mollusk in the family Borsoniidae.

== Description ==
The length of the shell attains 32 mm.

== Distribution ==
This species occurs in the Antarctic waters of the Scotia Sea, and the Weddell Sea.
