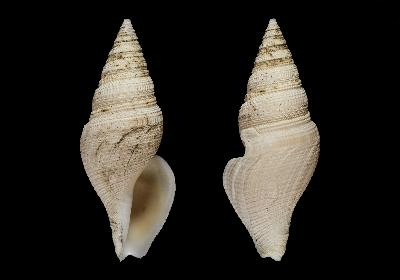
- Shell of Bathytoma episoma (holotype in the MNHN, Paris)

Scientific classification
- Kingdom: Animalia
- Phylum: Mollusca
- Class: Gastropoda
- Subclass: Caenogastropoda
- Order: Neogastropoda
- Superfamily: Conoidea
- Family: Borsoniidae
- Genus: Bathytoma
- Species: B. episoma

Binomial name
- Bathytoma episoma Puillandre, Sysoev, Olivera, Couloux & Bouchet, 2010

= Bathytoma episoma =

Species of gastropod

Bathytoma episoma is a species of sea snail, a marine gastropod mollusk in the family Borsoniidae.

== Distribution ==
This marine species occurs in the Bohol Sea, the Philippines.

== Description ==
The height of this species varies between 55 mm and 80 mm.
