= Belaturricula turrita =

Scientific classification
- Kingdom: Animalia
- Phylum: Mollusca
- Class: Gastropoda
- Subclass: Caenogastropoda
- Order: Neogastropoda
- Superfamily: Conoidea
- Family: Borsoniidae
- Genus: Belaturricula
- Species: B. turrita

Binomial name
- Belaturricula turrita (Strebel, 1908)

Synonyms
- Bela turrita Strebel, 1908

Species of gastropod

Belaturricula turrita is a species of sea snail, a marine gastropod mollusk in the family Borsoniidae.

There are two subspecies :

- Belaturricula turrita multispiralis Dell, 1990
- Belaturricula turrita turrita (Strebel, 1908): represented as Belaturricula turrita (Strebel, 1908)

== Description ==
The length of the shell varies between 25 and 60 millimetres (0.98 and 2.36 in).

== Distribution ==
This marine species occurs in the Antarctic Ocean waters of the Scotia Sea and off the South Shetlands, South Georgia and South Sandwich Islands
