= Bathytoma nonplicata =

Scientific classification
- Kingdom: Animalia
- Phylum: Mollusca
- Class: Gastropoda
- Subclass: Caenogastropoda
- Order: Neogastropoda
- Superfamily: Conoidea
- Family: Borsoniidae
- Genus: Bathytoma
- Species: B. nonplicata

Binomial name
- Bathytoma nonplicata G.F. Harris, 1937

Extinct species of gastropod

Bathytoma nonplicata is an extinct species of sea snail, a marine gastropod mollusk in the family Borsoniidae.

== Distribution ==
This extinct marine species was endemic to the Eocene of the United States (Alabama, Louisiana, Texas) in the age range between 48.6 Ma to 37.2 Ma.

== Description ==
This species is considered an epifaunal carnivore.
