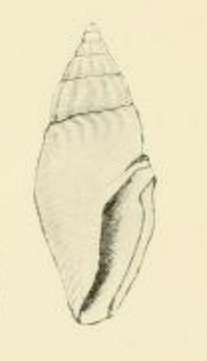
- Original drawing of the shell of Apaturris expeditionis

Conservation status
- Naturally Uncommon (NZ TCS)

Scientific classification
- Kingdom: Animalia
- Phylum: Mollusca
- Class: Gastropoda
- Subclass: Caenogastropoda
- Order: Neogastropoda
- Superfamily: Conoidea
- Family: Borsoniidae
- Genus: Apaturris
- Species: A. expeditionis

Binomial name
- Apaturris expeditionis (Oliver, 1915)

Synonyms
- Mitromorpha expeditionis Oliver, 1915 (basionym); Mitromorpha (Mitrolumna) expeditionis (W. R. B. Oliver, 1915)

= Apaturris expeditionis =

Species of gastropod

Apaturris expeditionis is a species of sea snail in the family Borsoniidae. This species was first described by Walter Oliver in 1915 and originally named Mitromorpha expeditionis.

== Description ==
(Original description) The shell is broadly fusiform and broadest about the middle The aperture is equal in length to the spire. The 6½ whorls are flattened. The suture is impressed. The body whorl is ventricose and regularly tapered in front. The aperture is long, oblique and posteriorly deflected to the right. The acute outer lip is not thin. The sinus is near the suture, deep and shows a thick rim. The thin inner lip is broad. The columella is flattened, and has two obscure plications near the middle. The canal is short, wide and truncate in front.

Sculpture: The smooth protoconch consists of 1½ whorls. The first adult whorl has 2 spiral threads on the periphery, 2nd with 10 sinuous axial ridges overridden by fine spiral threads. The succeeding two whorls are similarly sculptured, the axial ridges and spiral threads being more numerous. The body whorl shows low axial ridges, sinuous near the suture and becoming obsolete at the periphery, the whole overridden by close regular spiral threads.

Colour : Dark buff, a faint purple spiral band on the lower edge of the spire whorls. On the body whorl are sinuous brown marks near the suture.

Height, 5–2 mm. Diameter, 2–2 mm.

Variations from type. – The colour varies from white to buff, most shells being ornamented with a few irregular brown marks.

Habitat. – Dead shells dredged in 10 m. to 30 m. on gravelly bottom off Sunday Island.

== Distribution ==
This marine species is endemic to New Zealand and occurs off the Kermadec Islands in gravel at depths between 31 m and 47 m.
