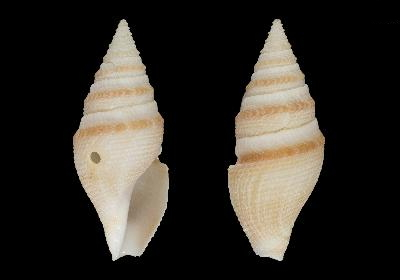
- Shell of Bathytoma consors (holotype in the MNHN, Paris)

Scientific classification
- Kingdom: Animalia
- Phylum: Mollusca
- Class: Gastropoda
- Subclass: Caenogastropoda
- Order: Neogastropoda
- Superfamily: Conoidea
- Family: Borsoniidae
- Genus: Bathytoma
- Species: B. consors

Binomial name
- Bathytoma consors Puillandre, Sysoev, Olivera, Couloux & Bouchet, 2010

= Bathytoma consors =

Species of gastropod

Bathytoma consors is a species of sea snail, a marine gastropod mollusk in the family Borsoniidae.

== Distribution ==
This marine species occurs in the Southwestern Pacific off the Solomon Islands.

== Description ==
The height of this species attains 46 mm. The shell is off-white in color with brown stripes spiraling up the shell. the shell of Bathytoma consors is rough to the touch with the shell being bumpy similar to other species of its genus.
