= Bathytoma prior =

Scientific classification
- Kingdom: Animalia
- Phylum: Mollusca
- Class: Gastropoda
- Subclass: Caenogastropoda
- Order: Neogastropoda
- Superfamily: Conoidea
- Family: Borsoniidae
- Genus: Bathytoma
- Species: B. prior

Binomial name
- Bathytoma prior (Vella, 1954)

Synonyms
- Micapantex murdochi prior Vella, 1954

Extinct species of gastropod

Bathytoma prior is an extinct species of sea snail, a marine gastropod mollusk in the family Borsoniidae.

== Distribution ==
This extinct marine species is endemic to New Zealand.

== Description ==
The height of the shell attains 20 mm, its diameter is 9 mm.
