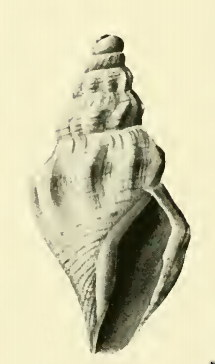
- Original drawing of a shell of Bathytoma lacertosus

Scientific classification
- Kingdom: Animalia
- Phylum: Mollusca
- Class: Gastropoda
- Subclass: Caenogastropoda
- Order: Neogastropoda
- Superfamily: Conoidea
- Family: Borsoniidae
- Genus: Bathytoma
- Species: B. profundis

Binomial name
- Bathytoma profundis (Laseron, 1954)

Synonyms
- Micantapex profundis Laseron, 1954

= Bathytoma profundis =

Species of gastropod

Bathytoma profundis is a species of sea snail, a marine gastropod mollusk in the family Conidae, the cone snails and their allies. This species was first described by Laseron in 1954. It is known for its distinct shell morphology and its occurrence in specific marine environments such as in some parts of Australia and New Zealand.

== Description ==
The shell of Bathytoma profundis is relatively small, with a maximum length of about 20 mm.

== Distribution ==
Bathytoma profundis is found in the marine waters off Australia, particularly in New South Wales, Queensland, and Victoria, as well as off New Zealand.
