= Bathytoma belaeformis =

Scientific classification
- Kingdom: Animalia
- Phylum: Mollusca
- Class: Gastropoda
- Subclass: Caenogastropoda
- Order: Neogastropoda
- Superfamily: Conoidea
- Family: Borsoniidae
- Genus: Bathytoma
- Species: B. belaeformis

Binomial name
- Bathytoma belaeformis (Sowerby III, 1903)

Synonyms
- Micantapex belaeformis (G.B. Sowerby III, 1903); Pleurotoma (Genotia) belaeformis Sowerby III, 1903

Species of gastropod

Bathytoma belaeformis is a species of sea snail, a marine gastropod mollusk in the family Borsoniidae.

== Description ==
The length of the shell is 23 mm.

== Distribution ==
This marine species occurs off Cape Point, Republic of South Africa.
