= Bathytoma somalica =

Scientific classification
- Kingdom: Animalia
- Phylum: Mollusca
- Class: Gastropoda
- Subclass: Caenogastropoda
- Order: Neogastropoda
- Superfamily: Conoidea
- Family: Borsoniidae
- Genus: Bathytoma
- Species: B. somalica

Binomial name
- Bathytoma somalica Ardovini, 2015

Species of gastropod

Bathytoma somalica is a species of sea snail, a marine gastropod mollusk in the family Borsoniidae.

== Distribution ==
This marine species occurs in the Indian Ocean off Somalia and Mozambique.
