= Bathytoma oldhami =

Scientific classification
- Kingdom: Animalia
- Phylum: Mollusca
- Class: Gastropoda
- Subclass: Caenogastropoda
- Order: Neogastropoda
- Family: Borsoniidae
- Genus: Bathytoma
- Species: B. oldhami

Binomial name
- Bathytoma oldhami (E.A. Smith, 1899)

Synonyms
- Pleurotoma oldhami E.A. Smith, 1899

Species of gastropod

Bathytoma oldhami is a species of sea snail, a marine gastropod mollusc in the family Borsoniidae.

== Distribution ==
This marine species occurs along Southern India.
