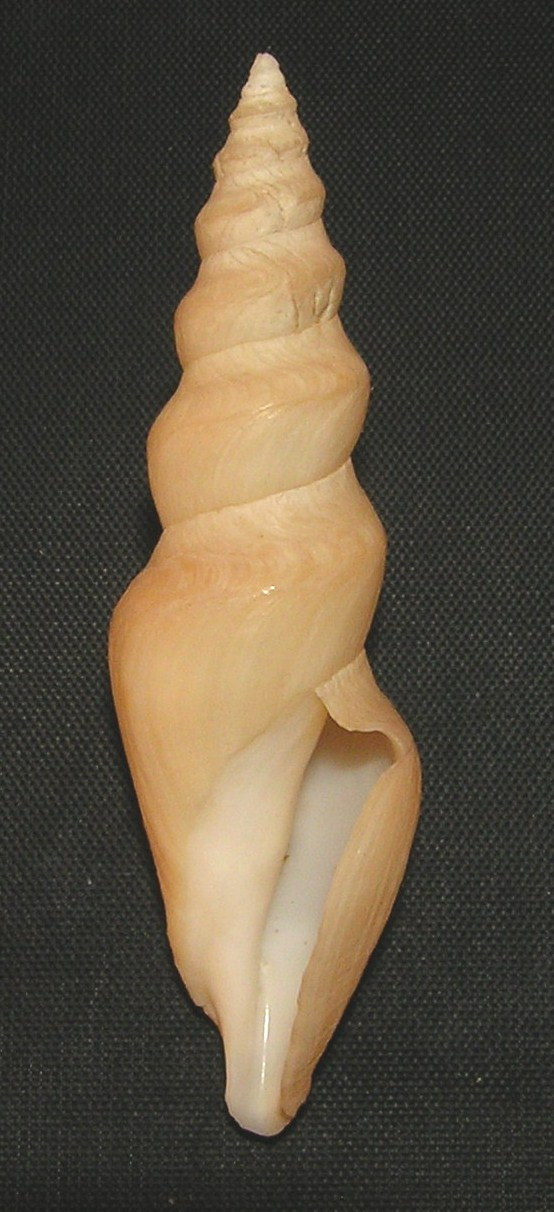
- Apertural view of a shell of Bathytoma visagei

Scientific classification
- Kingdom: Animalia
- Phylum: Mollusca
- Class: Gastropoda
- Subclass: Caenogastropoda
- Order: Neogastropoda
- Superfamily: Conoidea
- Family: Borsoniidae
- Genus: Bathytoma
- Species: B. visagei

Binomial name
- Bathytoma visagei Kilburn, 1973

Synonyms
- Bathytoma (Parabathytoma) visagei Kilburn, 1973 · accepted, alternate representation; Bathytoma visagei var. decorata Ardovini, 2015 (unavailable: established as a "variety"); Parabathytoma visagei Kilburn, 1973

= Bathytoma visagei =

Species of gastropod

Bathytoma visagei is a species of sea snail, a marine gastropod mollusk in the family Borsoniidae.

== Description ==
The length of the shell varies between 60 mm and 75 mm.

== Distribution ==
This species occurs in the Indian Ocean off Mozambique and KwaZuluNatal, South Africa.
