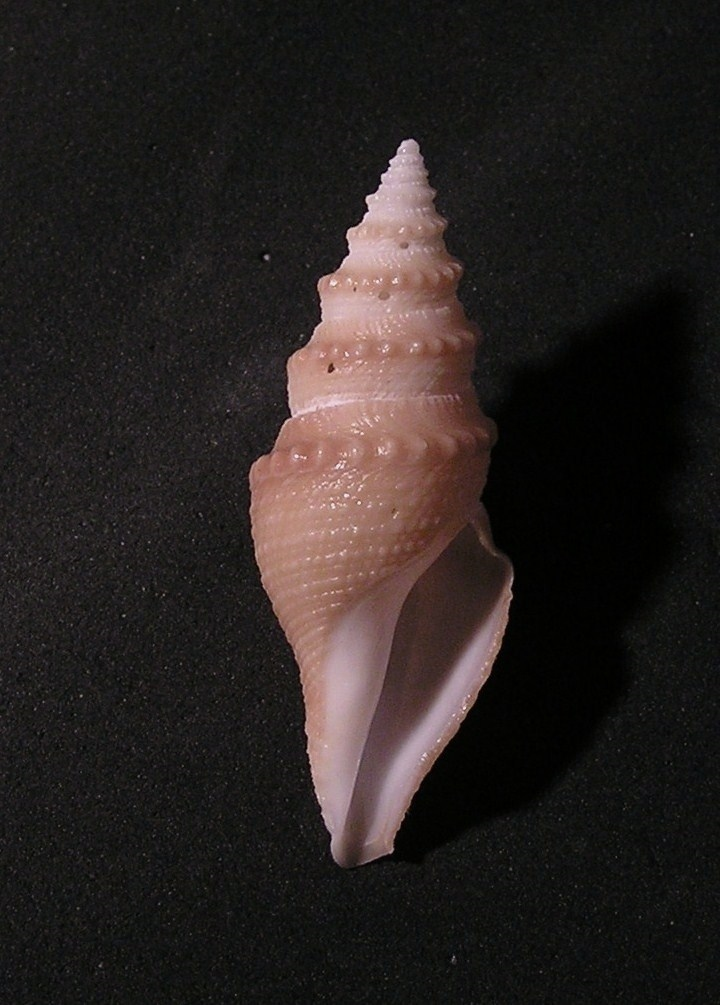
- Apertural view of Bathytoma helenae

Scientific classification
- Kingdom: Animalia
- Phylum: Mollusca
- Class: Gastropoda
- Subclass: Caenogastropoda
- Order: Neogastropoda
- Superfamily: Conoidea
- Family: Borsoniidae
- Genus: Bathytoma
- Species: B. helenae

Binomial name
- Bathytoma helenae Kilburn, 1974

Synonyms
- Bathytoma (Parabathytoma) helenae Kilburn, 1974; Parabathytoma helenae Kilburn, 1974

= Bathytoma helenae =

Species of gastropod

Bathytoma helenae is a species of sea snail, a marine gastropod mollusk in the family Borsoniidae.

== Description ==
The shell reaches a length of 50 mm.

== Distribution ==
This marine species occurs off KwaZuluNatal, South Africa.
