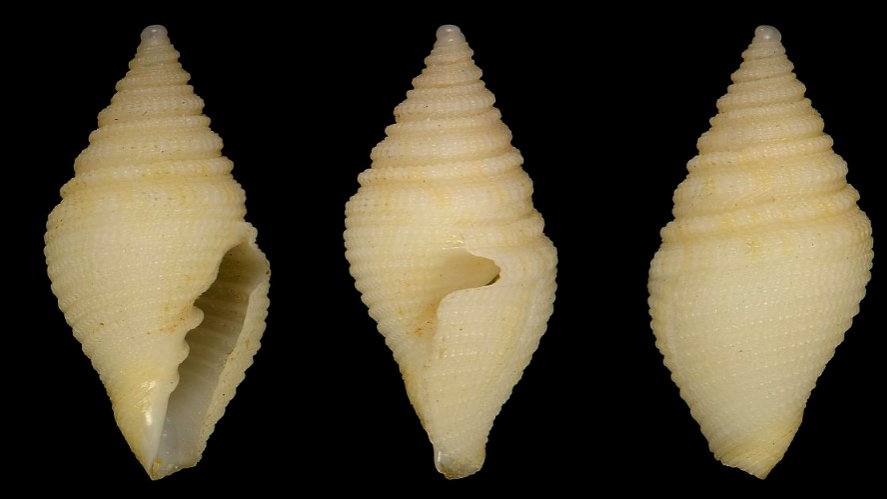
- Shell of Paraborsonia lindae (holotype at the Smithsonian Institution)

Scientific classification
- Kingdom: Animalia
- Phylum: Mollusca
- Class: Gastropoda
- Subclass: Caenogastropoda
- Order: Neogastropoda
- Superfamily: Conoidea
- Family: Borsoniidae
- Genus: Paraborsonia
- Species: P. lindae

Binomial name
- Paraborsonia lindae Petuch, 1987

= Paraborsonia lindae =

Species of gastropod

Paraborsonia lindae is a species of sea snail, a marine gastropod mollusc in the family Borsoniidae.

== Description ==
Original description: "Shell short, stocky, biconic in shape; shoulder rounded, demarcated by 2 large, beaded cords; body whorl ornamented with 20-25 fine, beaded spiral cords; subsutural area indented, slightly canaliculate; columella with 3 large plications; interior of aperture with numerous ribs; protoconch large, flattened on top; anal notch corresponding to canaliculate subsutural area, deep and narrow; shell color pale yellow with darker yellow crescent-shaped flammules along the shoulder; anterior tip of columella dark yellow; interior of aperture white."

The length of the shell attains 16 mm.

== Distribution ==
Locus typicus: "Golfo de Triste, off Puerto Cabello, Venezuela."

This marine species occurs in the Caribbean Sea off Venezuela and Guadeloupe
