= Bathytoma fortinodosa =

Scientific classification
- Kingdom: Animalia
- Phylum: Mollusca
- Class: Gastropoda
- Subclass: Caenogastropoda
- Order: Neogastropoda
- Superfamily: Conoidea
- Family: Borsoniidae
- Genus: Bathytoma
- Species: B. fortinodosa

Binomial name
- Bathytoma fortinodosa (Marwick, 1931)

Extinct species of gastropod

Bathytoma fortinodosa is an extinct species of sea snail, a marine gastropod mollusk in the family Borsoniidae.

== Distribution ==
This extinct marine species is endemic to New Zealand .
