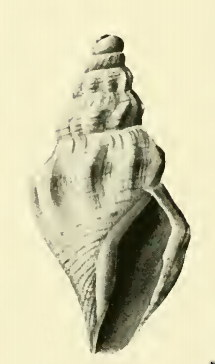
- Original drawing of a shell of Bathytoma lacertosus

Scientific classification
- Kingdom: Animalia
- Phylum: Mollusca
- Class: Gastropoda
- Subclass: Caenogastropoda
- Order: Neogastropoda
- Superfamily: Conoidea
- Family: Borsoniidae
- Genus: Bathytoma
- Species: B. lacertosus

Binomial name
- Bathytoma lacertosus (Hedley, 1922)

Synonyms
- Micantapex lacertosus auct.; Inquisitor lacertosus Hedley, 1922; Clavus lacertosus (Hedley, 1922)

= Bathytoma lacertosus =

Species of gastropod

Bathytoma lacertosus is a species of sea snail, a marine gastropod mollusk in the family Borsoniidae.

== Description ==
The length of the shell attains 13 mm, its width 7 mm.

(Original description) The solid shell is biconical. It contains six whorls, of which two compose the protoconch. Its colour is salmon-buff, the ribs cream. A few scattered ferruginous dots and large square ferruginous spots appear in the intercostal spaces. The ribs are low, trabecular, and projecting in an acute angle from the shoulder. There are nine ribs on the body whorl. Sometimes elevated crescentic lamellae extend from these ribs to the suture. Other lamellae continue as fine growth lines across the shell. The spirals are faint threads, evanescent on the shoulder and prominent on the snout. Of these there are about forty on the body whorl, twelve of which are posterior to the angle. The aperture is simple and unfinished in the only example available.

== Distribution ==
This species occurs in the demersal zone of Southwest Pacific Ocean off Queensland and New South Wales, Australia.
