= Bathytoma parengonia =

Scientific classification
- Kingdom: Animalia
- Phylum: Mollusca
- Class: Gastropoda
- Subclass: Caenogastropoda
- Order: Neogastropoda
- Superfamily: Conoidea
- Family: Borsoniidae
- Genus: Bathytoma
- Species: B. parengonia

Binomial name
- Bathytoma parengonia (Dell, 1956)

Synonyms
- Bathytoma (Riuguhdrillia) parengonia (Dell, 1956) · accepted, alternate representation; Micantapex parengonius Dell, 1956; Pleurotoma (Genota) engonia Watson, 1881

Species of gastropod

Bathytoma parengonia is a species of sea snail, a marine gastropod mollusk in the family Borsoniidae.

== Description ==
The length of the shell attains 30 mm.

== Distribution ==
This marine species is endemic to the Chatham Rise, New Zealand.
