= Bathytoma gabrielae =

Scientific classification
- Kingdom: Animalia
- Phylum: Mollusca
- Class: Gastropoda
- Subclass: Caenogastropoda
- Order: Neogastropoda
- Superfamily: Conoidea
- Family: Borsoniidae
- Genus: Bathytoma
- Species: B. gabrielae

Binomial name
- Bathytoma gabrielae Bozzetti, 2006

Species of gastropod

Bathytoma gabrielae is a species of sea snail, a marine gastropod mollusk in the family Borsoniidae.

== Description ==
The size of an adult shell varies between 30 mm and 50 mm.

== Distribution ==
This species occurs in the Indian Ocean off Tanzania and Mozambique.
