= Glyptaesopus xenicus =

Scientific classification
- Kingdom: Animalia
- Phylum: Mollusca
- Class: Gastropoda
- Subclass: Caenogastropoda
- Order: Neogastropoda
- Superfamily: Conoidea
- Family: Borsoniidae
- Genus: Glyptaesopus
- Species: G. xenicus

Binomial name
- Glyptaesopus xenicus (Pilsbry & Lowe, 1932)

Synonyms
- Aesopus xenicus Pilsbry & Lowe, 1932

Species of gastropod

Glyptaesopus xenicus is a species of sea snail, a marine gastropod mollusk in the family Borsoniidae.

== Description ==
The size of an adult shell grows to a length of 6 mm to 8 mm.

This species was first described by Henry A. Pilsbry and Herbert N. Lowe (1932) from specimens collected during an expedition to western Mexico and Central America between the years of 1929 and 1931. The species was described in the ‘Proceedings of the Academy of Natural Sciences of Philadelphia’. The species was placed in the genus Glyptaesopus that was created by Pilsbry and Olsson in 1941, also in the ‘Proceedings of the Academy of Natural Sciences of Philadelphia’, Volume 93.

== Distribution ==
This species occurs in the Pacific Ocean from Mexico to Ecuador.
