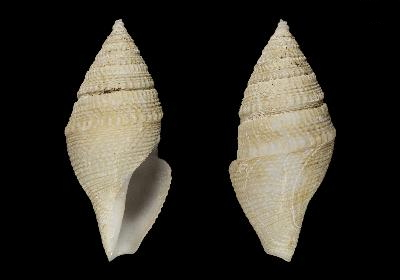
- Shell of Bathytoma netrion (holotype in the MNHN, Paris)

Scientific classification
- Kingdom: Animalia
- Phylum: Mollusca
- Class: Gastropoda
- Subclass: Caenogastropoda
- Order: Neogastropoda
- Superfamily: Conoidea
- Family: Borsoniidae
- Genus: Bathytoma
- Species: B. netrion

Binomial name
- Bathytoma netrion Puillandre, Sysoev, Olivera, Couloux & Bouchet, 2010

= Bathytoma netrion =

Species of gastropod

Bathytoma netrion is a species of sea snail, a marine gastropod mollusk in the family Borsoniidae.

== Distribution ==
This marine species occurs off Eastern Indonesia.

== Description ==
The height of this species attains 35 mm.
