= Bathytoma bitorquata =

Scientific classification
- Kingdom: Animalia
- Phylum: Mollusca
- Class: Gastropoda
- Subclass: Caenogastropoda
- Order: Neogastropoda
- Superfamily: Conoidea
- Family: Borsoniidae
- Genus: Bathytoma
- Species: B. bitorquata

Binomial name
- Bathytoma bitorquata (Martens, 1901)

Synonyms
- Pleurotoma (Dolichotoma) bitorquata Martens, 1901

Species of gastropod

Bathytoma bitorquata is a species of sea snail, a marine gastropod mollusk in the family Borsoniidae.

== Distribution ==
The species is found in the Indian Ocean off the coast of Tanzania.
