= Bathytoma mitrella =

Scientific classification
- Kingdom: Animalia
- Phylum: Mollusca
- Class: Gastropoda
- Subclass: Caenogastropoda
- Order: Neogastropoda
- Superfamily: Conoidea
- Family: Borsoniidae
- Genus: Bathytoma
- Species: B. mitrella

Binomial name
- Bathytoma mitrella (Dall, 1881)

Synonyms
- Genota didyma Watson, R.B., 1881; Genotia mitrella Dall, 1881; Pleurotoma mitrella Dall, 1881

Species of gastropod

Bathytoma mitrella is a species of sea snail, a marine gastropod mollusk in the family Borsoniidae.

== Description ==
The shell grows to a length of 12.5 mm.

== Distribution ==
This species occurs in the Caribbean Sea off Yucatan (at depths between 823 m and 1170 m), Mexico, and in the Gulf of Mexico; also off the Lesser Antilles.
