= Bathytoma wairarapaensis =

Scientific classification
- Kingdom: Animalia
- Phylum: Mollusca
- Class: Gastropoda
- Subclass: Caenogastropoda
- Order: Neogastropoda
- Superfamily: Conoidea
- Family: Borsoniidae
- Genus: Bathytoma
- Species: B. wairarapaensis

Binomial name
- Bathytoma wairarapaensis (Vella, 1954)

Extinct species of gastropod

Bathytoma wairarapaensis is an extinct species of predatory sea snail in the family Borsoniidae. New Zealand palaeontologist, P. Vella, found the fossil in marine sediments of the southeastern Wairarapa on the North Island of New Zealand; it was first described by him in 1954.

== Taxonomy and discovery ==
Vella studied this fossil as part of a wider review of New Zealand's Tertiary molluscs, during the course of which he recognised Bathytoma wairarapaensis as a new species, distinguishable by its structure and by its proportions. The representative sample of the fossil that has been preserved came from the Middle Te Wharau beds on the south branch of the Whakatāhine Stream; these deposits were assigned to the upper Clifdenian or Lilburnian Stage of the New Zealand Miocene, or roughly from the mid-Neogene era.

MolluscaBase and the World Register of Marine Species confirm the species as valid and place it within the genus Bathytoma and the family Borsoniidae.

== Description ==
The shell is 27 mm in height; 15.5 mm in diameter. It has a compact and even shape, with an outline that tapers gradually at each end, towards a canal where the snail's siphon used to emerge. Its whorls show a distinctive ornamentation, with fine, spiral cords, running below a low ridge along the shoulder, and these give the surface a rather delicate and textured appearance. A deep notch can be seen on the opening of the shell; this secured the siphon while the snail was feeding.

The earliest developmental stage of the shell, known as the protoconch, is missing from any collection of fossils, meaning that it has not been possible to establish details of the earlier larval stage of this species.

== Palaeoenvironment ==
Vella (1954) described the beds where the fossil was found as fine-grained marine sediments and silts from the middle Miocene, containing an array of bivalves and small predatory snails. These he interpreted to be fossils showing evidence of a temperate moderately deep shelf habitat that had formed in calm and well-oxygenated waters and very likely below the reach of normal wave action.

Studies of New Zealand's Miocene marine geology in the decades following Vella document a gradual process of cooling that took place in this era, as well as noting a raising of the Earth's crust over a wide area. There were changes, too, in ocean circulation and sedimentation; these in turn altered coastal environments and along with this change, the composition of local molluscan faunas shifted. When looked at from this perspective, the disappearance of B. wairarapaensis reflects a wider-scale ecological shift, one that reshaped much of New Zealand’s marine life during the Miocene.

== Ecology and relationships ==
Bathytoma wairarapaensis shares characteristics with other members of its family, which point to its role as a predatory, marine gastropod. Together, the narrow opening and the deep sinus in the outer lip show the presence of a well-developed siphon, used to find prey within the surrounding silts and sediments. Its prey, in the Miocene seas of the Wairarapa, were small invertebrates that lived on the sea bed, or just below it.

The venom of descendants of this snail rapidly paralyse its prey by disrupting nerve and muscle activit allowing snails to swallow it whole.

== Distribution and status ==
Bathytoma wairarapaensis is known only from the fossil localities described by Vella in the southeastern Wairarapa.
