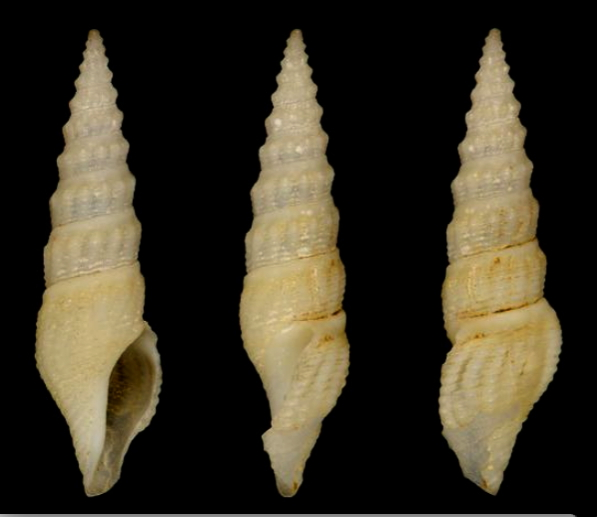
- Shell of Darbya lira (holotype at the Smithsonian Institution)

Scientific classification
- Kingdom: Animalia
- Phylum: Mollusca
- Class: Gastropoda
- Subclass: Caenogastropoda
- Order: Neogastropoda
- Superfamily: Conoidea
- Family: Borsoniidae
- Genus: Darbya
- Species: D. lira

Binomial name
- Darbya lira Bartsch, 1934

= Darbya lira =

Species of gastropod

Darbya lirai is a species of sea snail, a marine gastropod mollusk in the family Borsoniidae.

== Description ==
The length of the shell attains 23 mm.

(Original description) The shell has an elongate-conic shape. It is pale yellow, with a faint brown band encircling the whorls a little anterior to the sinal sulcus at the summit. The protoconch contains 1.5, smooth, well rounded whorls. The postnuclear whorls are well rounded. They are marked on the first three turns by a submedian row of distantly spaced cusps. On the succeeding whorls these cusps become elongated into ribs that extend from the sinal sulcus at the summit anteriorly to the suture, becoming weaker toward the suture. Of these ribs, 10 occur upon the first whorl, 12 upon the second and third, and 14 upon the remaining whorls except the body whorl, which has 16. The spaces that separate these ribs are a little less wide than the ribs. In addition to this there are numerous fine lines of growth, which slope retractively in the sulcus at the summit and protractively anteriorly. The sulcus at the summit is without spiral sculpture, whereas in the region anterior to it both ribs and intercostal spaces are crossed by rather strong, low, rounded, spiral cords, of which four occur upon the fifth to seventh, five upon the eighth, seven upon the ninth, and eight upon the body whorl between the summit and suture. These spiral cords are more or less equal. The suture is rendered conspicuous by the slightly sloping shoulder of the summit of the whorls. The periphery is well rounded. The base of the shell is short, marked by the feeble continuation of the axial ribs and by seven spiral cords which are of unequal strength. The columella is short and stubby with a strong, broad fold opposite the varix on the outer lip which is separated from the parietal wall by a concave groove. The shell is marked by seven rather broad spiral cords, which are separated by narrow channels. The aperture is short, decidedly channeled anteriorly and posteriorly, the posterior channel being deeply notched and at the summit of the shell. There is a broad varix half a whorl behind the aperture. The outer lip is protracted between the sinus and the basal portion. The inner lip is appressed to the columella as a heavy callus which extends over the parietal wall.

== Distribution ==
This marine species occurs off Puerto Rico and the US Virgin Islands.
