= Belaturricula gaini =

Scientific classification
- Kingdom: Animalia
- Phylum: Mollusca
- Class: Gastropoda
- Subclass: Caenogastropoda
- Order: Neogastropoda
- Superfamily: Conoidea
- Family: Borsoniidae
- Genus: Belaturricula
- Species: B. gaini

Binomial name
- Belaturricula gaini (Lamy, 1910)

Synonyms
- Belaturricula antarctica Dell, 1990; Sipho gaini Lamy, 1910 (original combination)

Species of gastropod

Belaturricula gaini is a species of sea snail, a marine gastropod mollusk in the family Borsoniidae.

== Description ==
The shell grows to a length of 73 mm.

== Distribution ==
This marine species occurs off the South Shetlands, the Scotia Sea, the Ross Sea and the Antarctic Ocean; also off the South Orkneys and the South Shetlands.
