= Bathytoma haasti =

Scientific classification
- Kingdom: Animalia
- Phylum: Mollusca
- Class: Gastropoda
- Subclass: Caenogastropoda
- Order: Neogastropoda
- Superfamily: Conoidea
- Family: Borsoniidae
- Genus: Bathytoma
- Species: B. haasti

Binomial name
- Bathytoma haasti (Hutton, 1877)

Synonyms
- † Clavatula haasti Hutton 1877

Extinct species of gastropod

Bathytoma haasti is an extinct species of sea snail, a marine gastropod mollusk in the family Borsoniidae.

== Distribution ==
This extinct marine species is endemic to various locations, primarily within the Otaian to Altonian stages. Notable sites include the Mount Harris Formation in Mt Harris, South Canterbury (Otaian or Altonian type), Bluecliffs, Otaio River, the foot of Mt Horrible, Pareora River, Southburn Sand at Sutherlands, Ardgowan Shellbed in Oamaru, Awamoa Creek, and the Otahu Formation in Clifden. It is considerably more common in South Canterbury than in North Otago localities.

== Description ==
The species is moderate in size (30-55 mm) and has a biconic shape, with the spire comprising approximately 0.45-0.5 of the total height. The conical protoconch has 3.5 convex whorls, with the last 0.8 whorl featuring costellae. The teleoconch has 7-8 prominently shouldered whorls, with a concave sutural ramp. The last whorl is excavated with a short neck. Axial sculpture includes narrow tubercles on a peripheral band and sometimes prosocline ridges on the subsutural swelling, with numerous growth ridges. The penultimate whorl has 30-50 peripheral tubercles. Spiral sculpture is complex, with 2-3 narrow cords on peripheral tubercles and finer cords on the ramp, with stronger cords on the subsutural swelling. The base and upper neck have 10-15 narrow cords, with 1-3 threads between each pair; the lower neck has closely spaced cords. Most spirals are finely nodulose. The elongate aperture has a weakly twisted columella, a short, shallowly notched siphonal canal, and a thin outer lip with a broadly V-shaped anal sinus.
