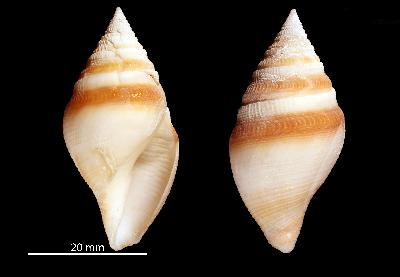
- Shell of Bathytoma gordonlarki (paratype in the MNHN, Paris)

Scientific classification
- Kingdom: Animalia
- Phylum: Mollusca
- Class: Gastropoda
- Subclass: Caenogastropoda
- Order: Neogastropoda
- Superfamily: Conoidea
- Family: Borsoniidae
- Genus: Bathytoma
- Species: B. gordonlarki

Binomial name
- Bathytoma gordonlarki Tucker & Olivera, 2011

= Bathytoma gordonlarki =

Species of gastropod

Bathytoma gordonlarki is a species of sea snail, a marine gastropod mollusc in the family Borsoniidae.

== Description ==
The size of the shell varies between 40 mm and 65 mm.

== Distribution ==
This marine species occurs off the Philippines.
