= Bathytoma hecatorgnia =

Scientific classification
- Kingdom: Animalia
- Phylum: Mollusca
- Class: Gastropoda
- Subclass: Caenogastropoda
- Order: Neogastropoda
- Superfamily: Conoidea
- Family: Borsoniidae
- Genus: Bathytoma
- Species: B. hecatorgnia

Binomial name
- Bathytoma hecatorgnia (Verco, 1907)

Synonyms
- Drillia hecatorgnia Verco, 1907; Micantapex hecatorgnia (Verco, 1907)

Species of gastropod

Bathytoma hecatorgnia is a species of sea snail, a marine gastropod mollusk in the family Borsoniidae.

== Distribution ==
This marine species occurs off South Australia.
