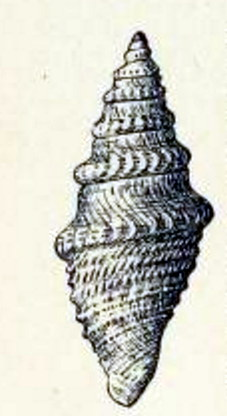
- Original drawing of a shell of Bathytoma regnans

Scientific classification
- Kingdom: Animalia
- Phylum: Mollusca
- Class: Gastropoda
- Subclass: Caenogastropoda
- Order: Neogastropoda
- Superfamily: Conoidea
- Family: Borsoniidae
- Genus: Bathytoma
- Species: B. regnans

Binomial name
- Bathytoma regnans Melvill, 1918

Synonyms
- Parabathytoma regnans Melvill, 1918

= Bathytoma regnans =

Species of gastropod

Bathytoma regnans is a species of sea snail, a marine gastropod mollusk in the family Borsoniidae.

== Description ==
The length of the shell attains 30 mm, its diameter is 12 mm.

== Distribution ==
This species occurs in the Gulf of Aden, the Bay of Bengal and off Southern Australia.
