= Bathytoma pacifica =

Scientific classification
- Kingdom: Animalia
- Phylum: Mollusca
- Class: Gastropoda
- Subclass: Caenogastropoda
- Order: Neogastropoda
- Superfamily: Conoidea
- Family: Borsoniidae
- Genus: Bathytoma
- Species: B. pacifica

Binomial name
- Bathytoma pacifica Squires 2001

Extinct species of gastropod

Bathytoma pacifica is an extinct species of sea snail, a marine gastropod mollusk in the family Borsoniidae.

== Distribution ==
This extinct marine species was endemic to the Eocene of Southern California in the age range between 55.8 Ma to 48.6 Ma.

== Description ==
This species is considered an epifaunal carnivore.
