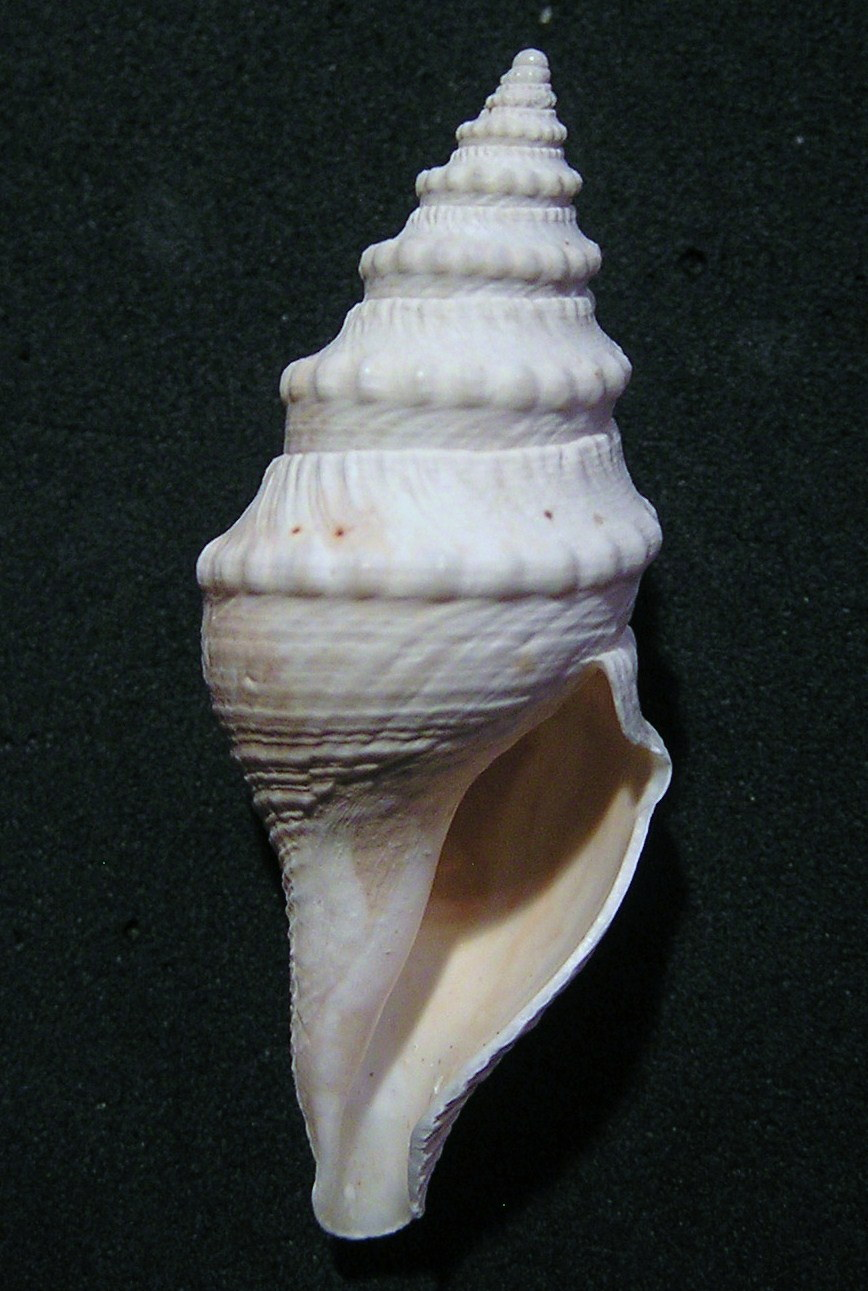
- Apertural view of a shell of Bathytoma prodicia

Scientific classification
- Kingdom: Animalia
- Phylum: Mollusca
- Class: Gastropoda
- Subclass: Caenogastropoda
- Order: Neogastropoda
- Superfamily: Conoidea
- Family: Borsoniidae
- Genus: Bathytoma
- Species: B. prodicia

Binomial name
- Bathytoma prodicia Kilburn, 1986

Synonyms
- Parabathytoma prodicia Kilburn, 1986

= Bathytoma prodicia =

Species of gastropod

Bathytoma prodicia is a species of sea snail, a marine gastropod mollusk in the family Borsoniidae.

== Description ==
The size of an adult shell varies between 35 mm and 55 mm.

== Distribution ==
This species occurs in the Indian Ocean off East and South Africa (Southern Mozambique to Zanzibar)
