= Bathytoma formosensis =

Scientific classification
- Kingdom: Animalia
- Phylum: Mollusca
- Class: Gastropoda
- Subclass: Caenogastropoda
- Order: Neogastropoda
- Superfamily: Conoidea
- Family: Borsoniidae
- Genus: Bathytoma
- Species: B. formosensis

Binomial name
- Bathytoma formosensis Vera-Pelaez, 2004

Species of gastropod

Bathytoma formosensis is a species of sea snail, a marine gastropod mollusk in the family Borsoniidae.
