= Bathytoma arbucklei =

Scientific classification
- Kingdom: Animalia
- Phylum: Mollusca
- Class: Gastropoda
- Subclass: Caenogastropoda
- Order: Neogastropoda
- Superfamily: Conoidea
- Family: Borsoniidae
- Genus: Bathytoma
- Species: B. arbucklei

Binomial name
- Bathytoma arbucklei Kilburn, 1986

Synonyms
- Bathytoma (Micantapex) arbucklei Kilburn, 1986; Micantapex arbucklei Kilburn, 1986

Species of gastropod

Bathytoma arbucklei is a species of sea snail, a marine gastropod mollusk in the family Borsoniidae.

== Distribution ==
This species occurs in the Indian Ocean off Transkei, Southeast South Africa, at depths between 300 m and 500 m.

== Description ==
The length of this biconical, white shell varies between 14.5 mm and 17.2 mm; its width between 6.6 mm and 8 mm. The periphery shows thin spiral threads, crossed by irregular threads resulting in fine granules at the intersections. The four whorls of the teleoconch show a strong, rounded shoulder. The base of spire whorls have strong spiral lirae, increasing in number towards the body whorl. The columella lacks a pleat.
