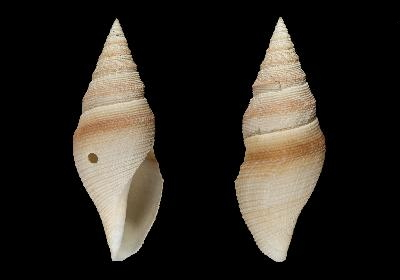
- Shell of Bathytoma badifasciata (holotype in the MNHN, Paris)

Scientific classification
- Kingdom: Animalia
- Phylum: Mollusca
- Class: Gastropoda
- Subclass: Caenogastropoda
- Order: Neogastropoda
- Superfamily: Conoidea
- Family: Borsoniidae
- Genus: Bathytoma
- Species: B. badifasciata

Binomial name
- Bathytoma badifasciata Puillandre, Sysoev, Olivera, Couloux & Bouchet, 2010

= Bathytoma badifasciata =

Species of gastropod

Bathytoma badifasciata is a species of sea snail, a marine gastropod mollusk in the family Borsoniidae.

== Distribution ==
This marine species occurs in the Southwestern Pacific. and the Solomon Islands.
