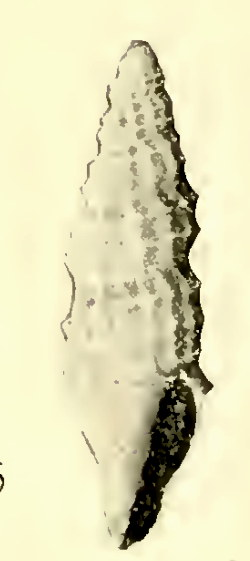
- Glyptaesopus phylira

Scientific classification
- Kingdom: Animalia
- Phylum: Mollusca
- Class: Gastropoda
- Subclass: Caenogastropoda
- Order: Neogastropoda
- Superfamily: Conoidea
- Family: Borsoniidae
- Genus: Glyptaesopus; Pilsbry & Olsson, 1941

Type species
- Aesopus xenicus Pilsbry & Lowe, 1932

= Glyptaesopus =

Genus of gastropods

Glyptaesopus is a genus of sea snails, marine gastropod mollusks in the family Borsoniidae.

== Description ==
The small shell is slender and contains 5½ sculptured whorls with weakly incised sutures. The aperture is long and narrow and has a thin outer lip. The siphonal canal is short.

== Species ==
Species within the genus Glyptaesopus include:

- Glyptaesopus oldroydi (Arnold, 1903)
- Glyptaesopus phylira (Dall, 1919)
- Glyptaesopus proctorae (M. Smith, 1936)
- Glyptaesopus xenicus (Pilsbry & Lowe, 1932)
