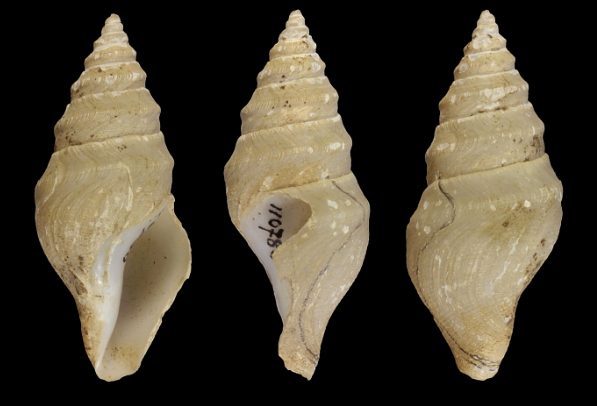
- Shell of Bathytoma engonia (holotype at the Smithsonian Institution)

Scientific classification
- Kingdom: Animalia
- Phylum: Mollusca
- Class: Gastropoda
- Subclass: Caenogastropoda
- Order: Neogastropoda
- Superfamily: Conoidea
- Family: Borsoniidae
- Genus: Bathytoma
- Species: B. engonia

Binomial name
- Bathytoma engonia (Watson, 1881)

Synonyms
- Bathytoma (Riuguhdrillia) engonia (Watson, 1881) · accepted, alternate representation; Genotia engonia Watson, 1881; Pleurotoma (Genota) engonia Watson, 1881; Riuguhdrillia engonia (Watson, 1881); Suavodrillia sagamiana Dall, 1925

= Bathytoma engonia =

Species of gastropod

Bathytoma engonia is a species of sea snail, a marine gastropod mollusk in the family Borsoniidae.

== Description ==
The size of the shell varies between 15 mm and 35 mm.

(Original description) The fusiform shell is biconical, with an expressed rounded keel angulating the whorls, and a broad prominent lopsided beak.

Sculpture : There are no axial ribs. The lines of growth are strong, hair-like, unequal, and close-set. On the keel they are exceptionally strong, regular, and a little remote, as they are also at the top of the whorls in the suture. The whorls are angulated about the middle, projecting in a rather narrow, prominent, rounded keel, almost crenulated by growth-lines. The whole surface is covered by small, broadish, rounded, close-set spiral threads, somewhat granulated at the base. On the left side of the point of the beak and also on the earlier regular whorls they tend to become obsolete.

Colour: porcellanous - white. The thin, membranaceous epidermis is yellowish.

The conical spire is high, about the same height as the aperture. The protoconch is blunt, rounded and contains 2 smooth globular whorls. The teleoconch contains 8 broad, short whorls that are regularly increasing, the last rather large, with a sloping slightly concave shoulder, straight below the keel. At the top of each whorl there is a slight collar, which gives the effect of a slight canaliculation to the suture. The base of the shell is somewhat swollen, prolonged into a short broad unequal-sided beak. The suture is strong and slightly canaliculated. The aperture is large, almost rhomboidally pear-shaped, sharply angled above, and with a broad open canal below. The outer lip regularly curved, thin and sharp, with an open V-shaped sinus at the shoulder, rounded at the angle. Below this it sweeps downwards and a little forwards, forming a very low-shouldered wing. Towards the lower part of the aperture it curves very regularly backwards to the point of the pillar. The columella is narrow and short, very obliquely truncate below, with a fine, but strong, sharpish twisted edge. The inner lip is polished and porcellanous, rather broadly excavated in the substance of the shell; scarcely convex on the parietal wall, very slightly concave at the junction with the columella.

== Distribution ==
This marine species occurs off Japan and Taiwan
