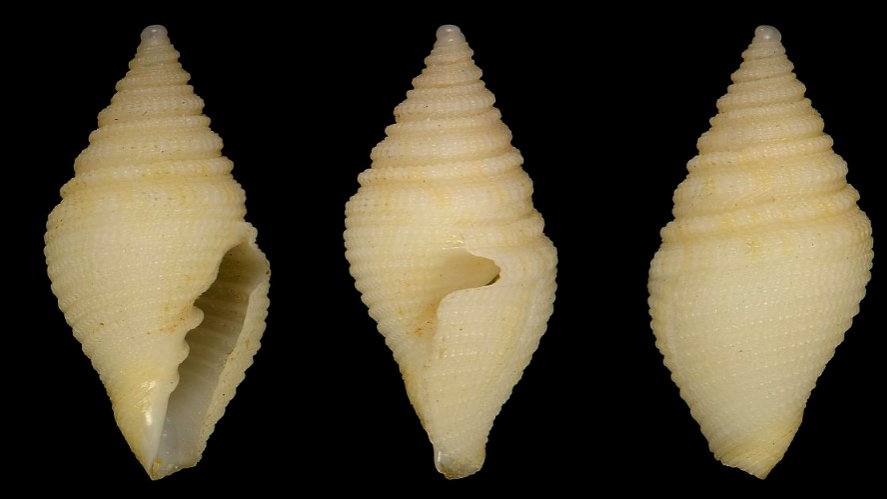
- Paraborsonia lindae

Scientific classification
- Kingdom: Animalia
- Phylum: Mollusca
- Class: Gastropoda
- Subclass: Caenogastropoda
- Order: Neogastropoda
- Superfamily: Conoidea
- Family: Borsoniidae
- Genus: Paraborsonia; Pilsbry, 1922

Type species
- † Mitra varicosa G. B. Sowerby I, 1850

Synonyms
- †Borsonia (Paraborsonia) Pilsbry, 1922 (original rank)

= Paraborsonia =

Genus of gastropods

Paraborsonia is a genus of sea snails, marine gastropod mollusks in the family Borsoniidae.

== Species ==
Species within the genus Paraborsonia include:

- Paraborsonia lindae Petuch, 1987
- † Paraborsonia varicosa (G. B. Sowerby I, 1850)
