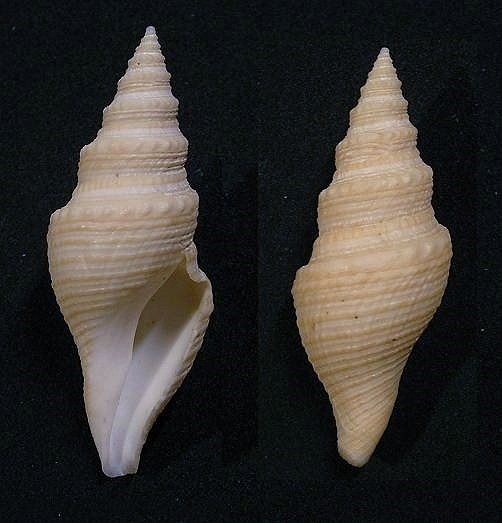
- Shell of Bathytoma luehdorfi (Lischke, 1872)

Scientific classification
- Kingdom: Animalia
- Phylum: Mollusca
- Class: Gastropoda
- Subclass: Caenogastropoda
- Order: Neogastropoda
- Superfamily: Conoidea
- Family: Borsoniidae
- Genus: Bathytoma; Harris & Burrows, 1891

Type species
- Murex cataphracta Brocchi, 1814

Synonyms
- Bathytoma (Micantapex) Iredale, 1936; Bathytoma (Parabathytoma) Shuto, 1961; Bathytoma (Riuguhdrillia) Oyama, 1951; † Dolichotoma Bellardi, 1875 (invalid: junior homonym of Dolichotoma Hope, 1839 [Coleoptera]; Bathytoma is a replacement name); Micantapex Iredale, 1936; Parabathytoma Shuto, 1961; Riuguhdrillia Oyama, 1951

= Bathytoma =

Bathytoma Temporal range: Paleocene - Recent

Genus of gastropods

Bathytoma is a genus of deep-water sea snails, marine gastropod mollusks in the family Borsoniidae.

== Fossil records ==
This genus is known in the fossil records from the Paleocene to the Quaternary (age range: 55.8 to 0.781 million years ago). Fossils are found in the marine strata throughout the world.

== Distribution ==
This marine species occurs in the Eastern Indian Ocean (Madagascar, Mozambique, South Africa); off Indonesia, New Caledonia, Panglao Island, Sulu Sea, Vanuatu, Wallis and Futuna, Bohol, Kerala, New Zealand, Philippines, Sea of Japan; off Australia (New South Wales, Queensland, Victoria, Western Australia). They are all known from deep waters from 100 m to about 1500 m, but usually at 200–700 m.

== Description ==
The lines of specific distinction appear to be drawn narrowly in this genus and to depend chiefly upon sculpture. The novelty appears intimately related to Bathytoma engonia (Watson, 1881) differing by the sharper keel, more elevated tubercles and generally coarser sculpture.

The biconical or fusiform shell is medium-sized to rather large. Its periphery is smooth or nodose, angulate or keeled. The peripheral anal sinus is deep. The columella is somewhat swollen, sometimes showing a pleat. The paucispiral protoconch consists of 1 to 3 conical or globose whorls, smooth or with faint spiral striae. The operculum is broadly oblanceolate to ovate shape, with an eccentric to terminal nucleus. The ground color of the shell is white to yellowish-brown.

Their protoconch morphology seems to infer a non-planktotrophic larval development.

== Species ==
Species within the genus Bathytoma include:

- Bathytoma agnata Hedley & Petterd, 1906
- Bathytoma arbucklei Kilburn, 1986
- Bathytoma atractoides (Watson, 1881)
- Bathytoma badifasciata Puillandre, Sysoev, Olivera, Couloux & Bouchet, 2010
- † Bathytoma bartrumi Laws, 1939
- Bathytoma belaeformis (Sowerby III, 1903)
- Bathytoma bitorquata (Martens, 1901)
- Bathytoma boholica Parth, 1994
- Bathytoma carnicolor Puillandre, Sysoev, Olivera, Couloux & Bouchet, 2010
- † Bathytoma cataphracta Brocchi 1814
- Bathytoma consors Puillandre, Sysoev, Olivera, Couloux & Bouchet, 2010
- † Bathytoma coweorum Beu, 1970
- Bathytoma cranaos Puillandre, Sysoev, Olivera, Couloux & Bouchet, 2010
- † Bathytoma discors Powell, 1942
- Bathytoma engonia (Watson, 1881)
- Bathytoma episoma Puillandre, Sysoev, Olivera, Couloux & Bouchet, 2010
- † Bathytoma filaris (Marwick, 1931)
- † Bathytoma finlayi Laws, 1939
- Bathytoma fissa (Martens, 1901)
- Bathytoma formosensis Vera-Pelaez, 2004
- † Bathytoma fortinodosa (Marwick, 1931)
- Bathytoma gabrielae Bozzetti, 2006
- Bathytoma gordonlarki Tucker & Olivera, 2011
- † Bathytoma haasti Hutton 1877
- † Bathytoma hawera (Laws, 1940)
- Bathytoma hecatorgnia (Verco, 1907)
- Bathytoma hedlandensis Tippett & Kosuge, 1994
- Bathytoma helenae Kilburn, 1974
- † Bathytoma hokianga Laws, 1947
- Bathytoma lacertosus (Hedley, 1922)
- Bathytoma luehdorfi (Lischke, 1872)
- † Bathytoma media (Marwick, 1931)
- † Bathytoma mitchelsoni Powell, 1935
- Bathytoma mitrella (Dall, 1881)
- Bathytoma murdochi Finlay, 1930
- Bathytoma neocaledonica Puillandre, Sysoev, Olivera, Couloux & Bouchet, 2010
- Bathytoma netrion Puillandre, Sysoev, Olivera, Couloux & Bouchet, 2010
- † Bathytoma ngatapa (Marwick, 1931)
- † Bathytoma nonplicata
- Bathytoma oldhami (Smith E. A., 1899)
- † Bathytoma pacifica Squires 2001
- † Bathytoma paracantha (J.E. Tenison-Woods, 1877)
- Bathytoma paratractoides Puillandre, Sysoev, Olivera, Couloux & Bouchet, 2010
- Bathytoma parengonia (Dell, 1956)
- † Bathytoma paucispiralis (Powell, 1942)
- † Bathytoma pergracilis (Marwick, 1931)
- † Bathytoma praecisa (Marwick, 1931)
- † Bathytoma prior (Vella, 1954)
- † Bathytoma proavita (Powell, 1942)
- Bathytoma prodicia Kilburn, 1986
- Bathytoma profundis (Laseron, 1954)
- Bathytoma punicea Puillandre, Sysoev, Olivera, Couloux & Bouchet, 2010
- Bathytoma regnans Melvill, 1918
- Bathytoma solomonensis Puillandre, Sysoev, Olivera, Couloux & Bouchet, 2010
- Bathytoma somalica Ardovini, 2015
- Bathytoma statuaria Poppe & Tagaro, 2026
- Bathytoma stenos Puillandre, Sysoev, Olivera, Couloux & Bouchet, 2010
- † Bathytoma tenuineta (Marwick, 1931)
- Bathytoma tippetti Vera-Peláez, 2004
- Bathytoma tuckeri Vera-Peláez, 2004
- Bathytoma viabrunnea (Dall, 1889)
- Bathytoma virgo (Okutani, 1966)
- Bathytoma visagei Kilburn, 1973
- † Bathytoma wairarapaensis Vella, 1954

Species brought into synonymy

- Bathytoma biconica Hedley, 1903: synonym of Benthofascis biconica (Hedley, 1903)
- Bathytoma colorata Sysoev & Bouchet, 2001: synonym of Gemmuloborsonia colorata (Sysoev & Bouchet, 2001)
- † Bathytoma condonana F.M. Anderson & B. Martin, 1914: synonym of Megasurcula condonana (F.M. Anderson & B. Martin, 1914)
- † Bathytoma excavata Suter, 1917: synonym of † Austrotoma excavata (Suter, 1917)
- Bathytoma sulcata excavata Suter, 1917 synonym of † Austrotoma excavata (Suter, 1917)
- Bathytoma gratiosa Suter, 1908: synonym of Fenestrosyrinx gratiosa (Suter, 1908), synonym of Taranis gratiosa (Suter, 1908)
- Bathytoma sarcinula Hedley, 1905: synonym of Benthofascis sarcinula (Hedley, 1905)
- Bathytoma tremperiana (Dall, 1911): synonym of Megasurcula tremperiana (Dall, 1911)
- Bathytoma tremperiana Dall, 1911: synonym of Megasurcula carpenteriana (Gabb, 1865)
- Subgenus Bathytoma (Parabathytoma) Shuto, 1961 represented as Bathytoma Harris & Burrows, 1891
- Bathytoma (Parabathytoma) helenae Kilburn, 1974 represented as Bathytoma helenae Kilburn, 1974
- Bathytoma (Parabathytoma) visagei Kilburn, 1973 represented as Bathytoma visagei Kilburn, 1973

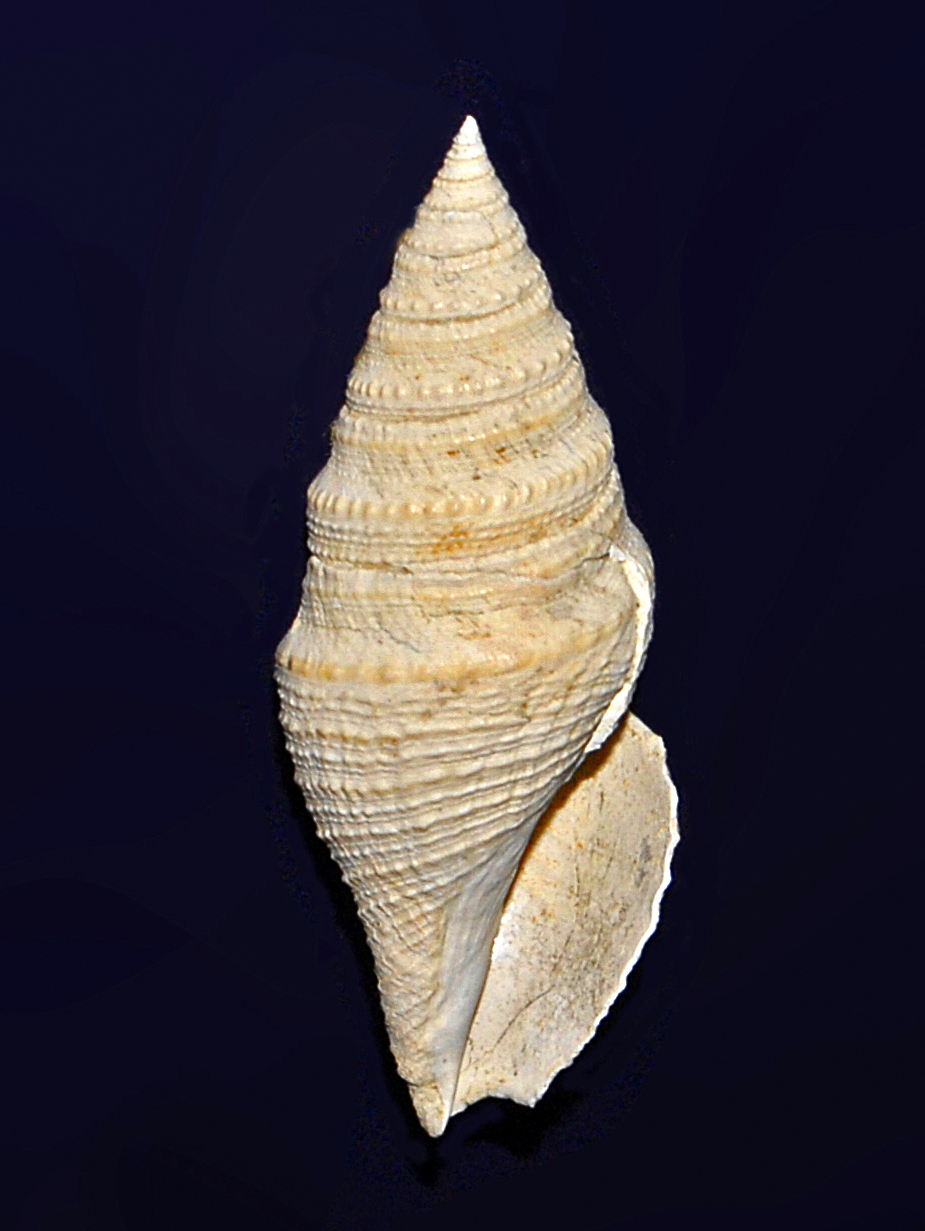
Fossil shell of Bathytoma cataphracta from Pliocene of Italy
