= Belaturricula =

Scientific classification
- Kingdom: Animalia
- Phylum: Mollusca
- Class: Gastropoda
- Subclass: Caenogastropoda
- Order: Neogastropoda
- Superfamily: Conoidea
- Family: Borsoniidae
- Genus: Belaturricula; Powell, 1951

Type species
- Bela turrita Strebel, 1908

Genus of molluscs

Belaturricula is a genus of sea snails, marine gastropod mollusks in the family Borsoniidae.

== Species ==
Species within the genus Belaturricula include:

- Belaturricula dissimilis (Watson, 1886)
- Belaturricula ergata (Hedley, 1916)
- Belaturricula gaini (Lamy, 1910)
- Belaturricula turrita (Strebel, 1908)

Species brought into synonymy

- Belaturricula antarctica Dell, 1990: synonym of Belaturricula gaini (Lamy, 1910)
