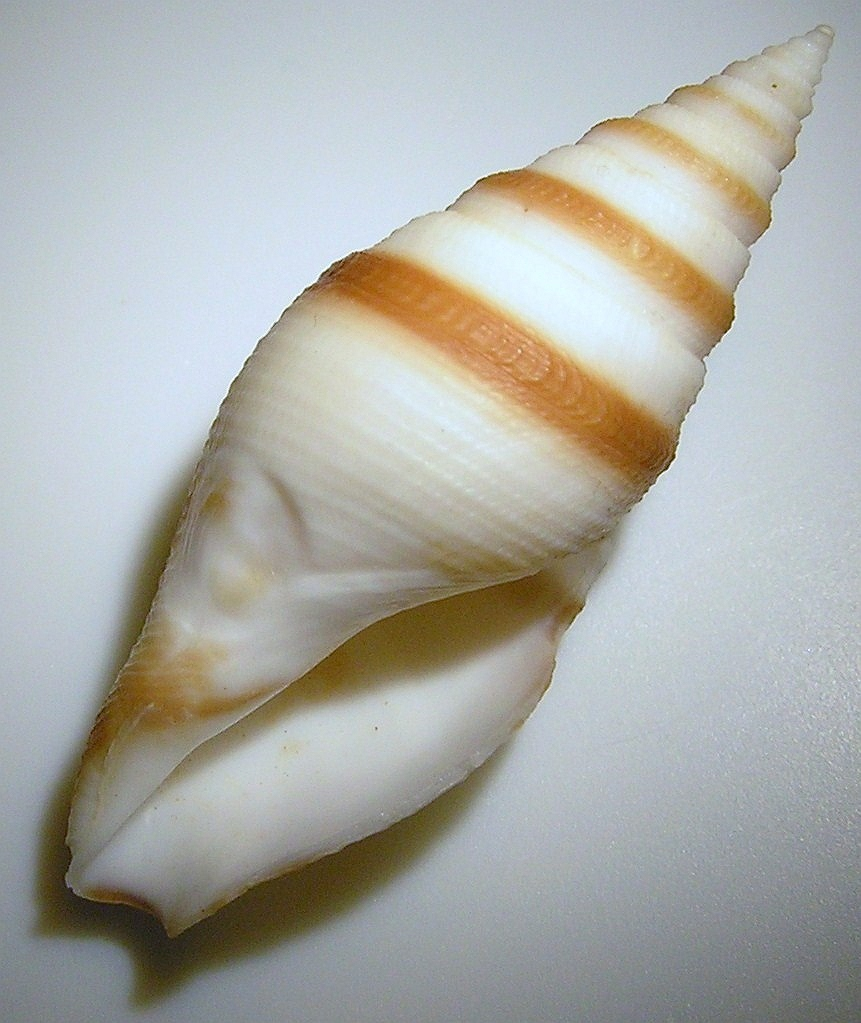
- Apertural view of Bathytoma attractoides boholica

Scientific classification
- Kingdom: Animalia
- Phylum: Mollusca
- Class: Gastropoda
- Subclass: Caenogastropoda
- Order: Neogastropoda
- Superfamily: Conoidea
- Family: Borsoniidae
- Genus: Bathytoma
- Species: B. atractoides

Binomial name
- Bathytoma atractoides (Watson, 1881)

Synonyms
- Pleurotoma (Genota) atractoides Watson, 1881

= Bathytoma atractoides =

Species of gastropod

Bathytoma atractoides is a species of sea snail, a marine gastropod mollusk in the family Borsoniidae.

== Description ==
The size of an adult shell varies between 39 mm and 75 mm.

(Original description) Shell.—Fusiform, biconical, very slightly and bluntly angulated, with a scarcely convex base, elongated into a largish, slightly reverted, rather equal-sided snout.

Sculpture. Longitudinals :there are no ribs; but the close-set, hair-like lines of growth, at nearly regular intervals over the whole surface, rise into thread-like folds which score the shell rather markedly. Spirals—near the bottom of each whorl there is a slight keel on the line of the old sinus-scars It includes two, bluntly rounded, close-set threads, which are crenulated by a series of small squarish tubercles which, being arranged in pairs, one on each thread and placed one above the other, form short little bars. They are parted by furrows broader than they. There are about forty of these bars on the last whorl, becoming more irregular towards the mouth. On the penultimate whorl there are about fifty. But they again diminish in number on the upper whorls. Answering to these is another double row at the top of the whorls immediately below the suture. Only in these the under thread is more prominent, and has rounded tubercles, while the upper thread is scored by longitudinally narrow sharpish little bars. Between these infrasutural threads and the carinal threads the slightly concave surface is scored by four finer threads set with little white nodules. Of these, the second thread from above is the strongest, and its nodules are rhomboidal. Below the keel the whole surface is scored by distinct rounded threads, which rise into little nodules where crossed by the stronger lines of growth. The intervals between these are more than double the width of the threads. They rather increase in distinctness forwards. Two groups of three and then one by itself have finer threads, like shadows, in the intervals below them.

The colour of the shell is porcellanous white, with a buff apex and a faint tinge of suffused buff on the body, especially in the sinus-scar and within the mouth. The nodules stand out pure white.

The spire is high and perfectly conical. Apex consists of 1 1/2 small, rounded, globular, brownish-buff coloured, embryonic whorls, of which the first is a good deal turned up on one side. The teleoconch contains 10 whorls, slightly keeled and banded, conical, broad, short and of very regular increase. The last is rather large, long, scarcely tumid on the base, gradually produced into a large, conical, rather equal-sided snout, which is obliquely cut off from the point of the pillar backwards towards the outer lip, and which has a slight twist toward the right. The suture is slightly canaliculated, from the thickening of the infrasutural collar, behind which it is a little sharply cut in. The aperture is long and narrow, sharply angulated above, scarcely contracted below, and with hardly any canal in front. There is a slight tinge of buff within. The outer lip is very sharp and thin and a little contracted, except just toward the end of the canal, where it becomes slightly patulous. Its course is an angulated curve, steep above and long-drawn below. On leaving the body, it retreats very slightly and almost straight to the rather distant, bluntly rounded, large, open, and rectangular sinus. From this point its edge forms an almost semicircular curve to the point of the shell. The inner lip is hollowed rather deeply into the substance of the shell, which forms a raised edge outside of it. It is narrow on the body, rather broad on the pillar The line across the body and down the pillar is very little concave. The pillar is long and narrow, running out to a sharp point, which has a fine, rounded, and slightly twisted edge, but can scarcely be said to be in the least degree obliquely cut off.

== Distribution ==
This marine species occurs in the Eastern Indian Ocean; off the Andaman Islands, Indonesia, the Philippines, Western Australia and in Oceania (New Caledonia, Vanuatu, Wallis and Futuna)
