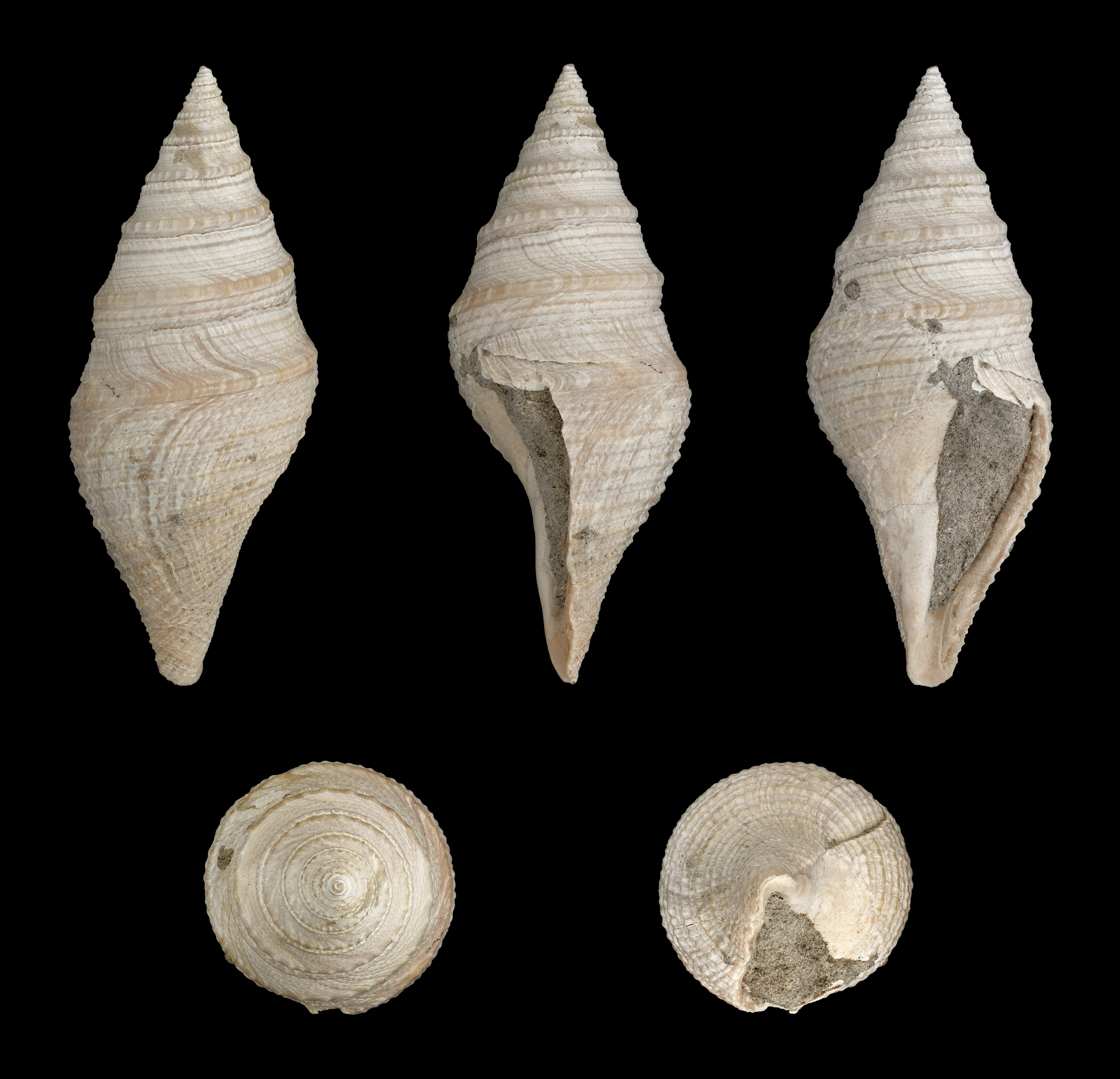
- Several shells of Bathytoma cataphracta

Scientific classification
- Kingdom: Animalia
- Phylum: Mollusca
- Class: Gastropoda
- Subclass: Caenogastropoda
- Order: Neogastropoda
- Superfamily: Conoidea
- Family: Borsoniidae
- Genus: Bathytoma
- Species: B. cataphracta

Binomial name
- Bathytoma cataphracta Brocchi, 1814

Synonyms
- Dolichotoma cataphracta; Genotia (Bathytoma) cataphracta; Murex (Pleurotoma) cataphractus

= Bathytoma cataphracta =

Extinct species of gastropod

Bathytoma cataphracta is an extinct species of sea snail, a marine gastropod mollusk in the family Borsoniidae.

== Distribution ==
This extinct marine species was found in the Miocene of Denmark, Italy, Pakistan and in the Oligocene of Hungary
