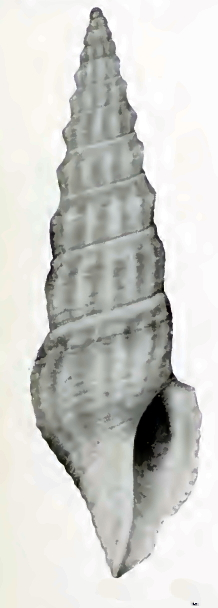
- Darbya lira

Scientific classification
- Kingdom: Animalia
- Phylum: Mollusca
- Class: Gastropoda
- Subclass: Caenogastropoda
- Order: Neogastropoda
- Superfamily: Conoidea
- Family: Borsoniidae
- Genus: Darbya; Bartsch, 1934

Type species
- Darbya lira Bartsch, 1934

= Darbya =

Genus of gastropods

Darbya is a genus of sea snails, marine gastropod mollusks in the family Borsoniidae.

== Species ==
Species within the genus Borsonia include:

- Darbya lira Bartsch, 1934

== Distribution ==
This marine genus occurs off Puerto Rico and the US Virgin Islands.
