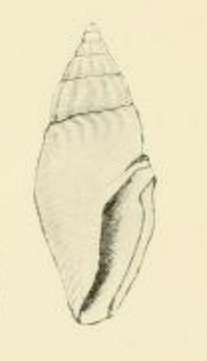

Scientific classification
- Kingdom: Animalia
- Phylum: Mollusca
- Class: Gastropoda
- Subclass: Caenogastropoda
- Order: Neogastropoda
- Superfamily: Conoidea
- Family: Borsoniidae
- Genus: Apaturris; Iredale, 1917

Type species
- Mitromorpha expeditionis Oliver, 1915

= Apaturris =

Genus of gastropods

Apaturris is a genus of sea snails in the family Borsoniidae.

Species in this genus have a relatively deep anal sinus.

== Species ==
Species within the genus Apaturris are:

- Apaturris costifera May, 1920
- Apaturris expeditionis (Oliver, 1915)
