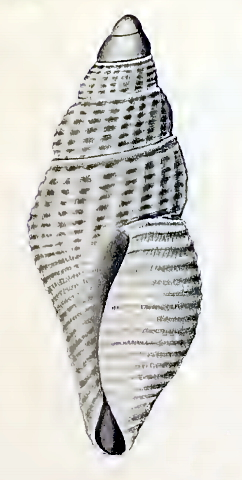
- Original image of a shell of Mitromorpha axicostata

Scientific classification
- Kingdom: Animalia
- Phylum: Mollusca
- Class: Gastropoda
- Subclass: Caenogastropoda
- Order: Neogastropoda
- Superfamily: Conoidea
- Family: Mitromorphidae
- Genus: Mitromorpha
- Species: M. axicostata

Binomial name
- Mitromorpha axicostata Verco, 1909

= Mitromorpha axicostata =

Species of gastropod

Mitromorpha axicostata is a species of sea snail, a marine gastropod mollusk in the family Mitromorphidae.

== Description ==
The length of the shell attains 4.9 mm, its diameter 2.1 mm.

(Original description) The solid shell has an elongate-oval shape. It consists of 6 whorls, including the pointed protoconch of 2½ smooth convex whorls. The whorls of the spire are slightly convex. The suture is simple and is margined by a flat, narrow band. The base of the shell is moderately contracted. The aperture is elongate-oval, slightly constricted into a short, open siphonal canal. The outer lip is thin, simple, convex in profile, with a shallow, wide depression just belowi the ascending suture. The inner lip is complete and has an applied thin glaze, callous at the suture. The columella is long, nearly straight, slightly prominent at the junction with a concave base of the body whorl. No definite plait. The sculpture sconsists of oblique rounded axial ribs, as wide as the interspaces, absent from the base, and vanishing towards the aperture. The spiral lirae are flatly convex, wider than their spaces, cross the ribs, nine in the penultimate, twenty-five in the body whorl. When fresh there is a walnut-coloured band over the middle third of the body whorl, less extensive in the intercostal spaces. This appears above the suture in the spire whorls; the ribs are dotted above, and there are curved axial lines of dots on the lirae at the base. The size may reach to—Length, 73 mm.; of the body-whorl, 36 mm. :breadth, 3 mm. The ribs in the longer form may be much narrower, and may be obsolete before reaching the body whorl.

== Distribution ==
This marine species is endemic to Australia and occurs off South Australia.
