= Otaio River =

Coordinates: 44°33′S 171°11′E

Location
- Country: New Zealand

Physical characteristics
- Source
  - location: Mount Studholme
- Mouth
  - location: Pacific Ocean
- Length: 39 km (24 mi)

The Otaio River is a river of the south Canterbury region of New Zealand's South Island. It initially flows north from its source on the northern slopes of Mount Studholme in the Hunters Hills, turning northeast to enter the southern end of the Canterbury Plains. It then turns southeast, reaching the Pacific Ocean to the south of the town of St Andrews.

== See also ==
- List of rivers of New Zealand
