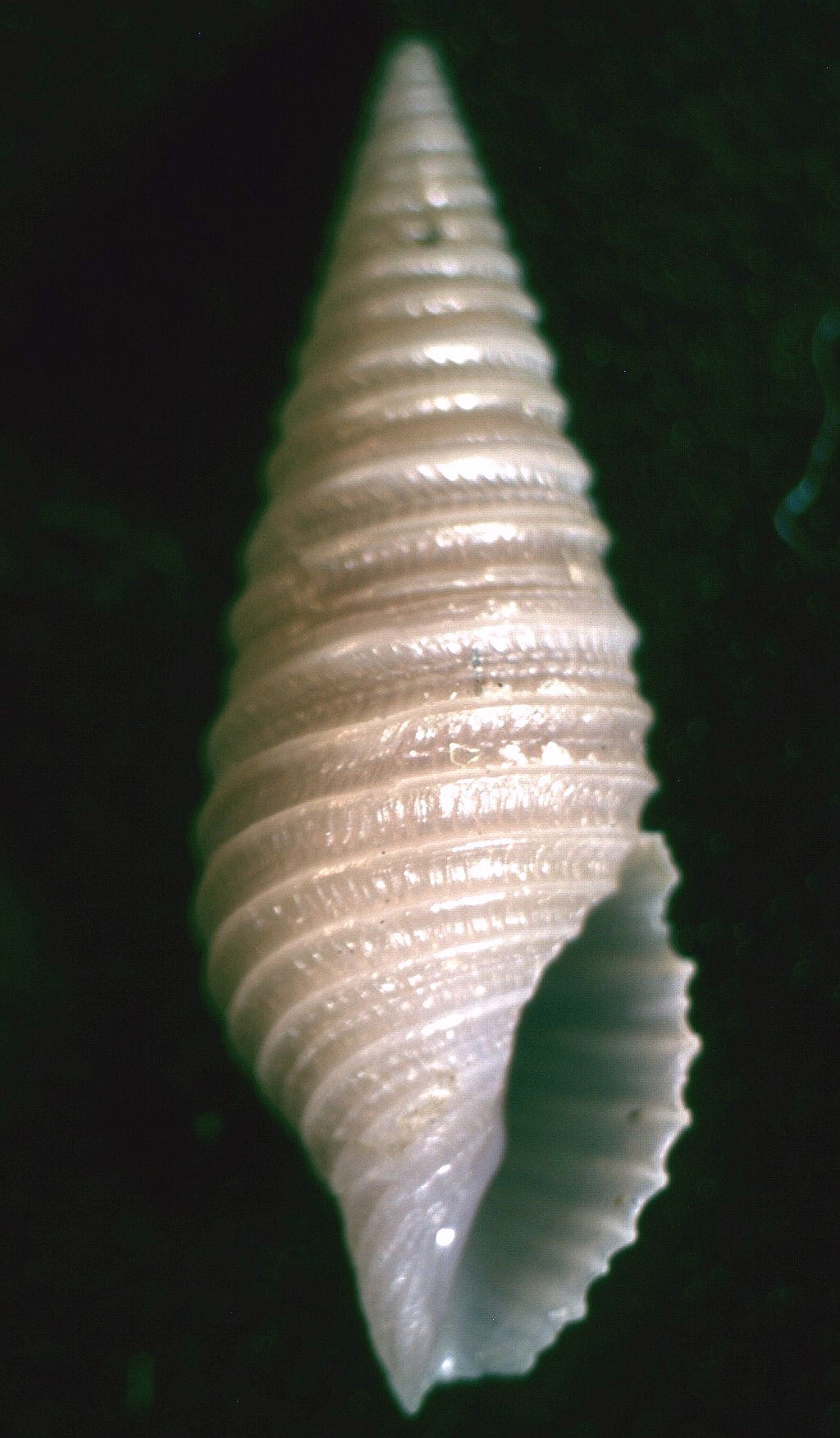
- Apertural view of a shell of Tomopleura reevii

Scientific classification
- Kingdom: Animalia
- Phylum: Mollusca
- Class: Gastropoda
- Subclass: Caenogastropoda
- Order: Neogastropoda
- Superfamily: Conoidea
- Family: Borsoniidae; Bellardi, 1875

Genera
- See text

Synonyms
- Pseudotominae Bellardi, 1875; Zemaciinae Sysoev, 2003

= Borsoniidae =

Family of sea snails

Borsoniidae is a monophyletic family of small to medium-sized sea snails, marine gastropod mollusks in the superfamily Conoidea.

In 2011, Bouchet, Kantor et al. brought genera from the subfamilies Clathurellinae and Raphitominae (they were previously placed in the family Conidae), as well as genera from the subfamily Zemaciinae (at that point belonging to the family Turridae), together to form the family Borsoniidae. This re-arrangement was based on anatomical characters and a dataset of molecular sequences of three gene fragments

== Description ==
This family is a rather heterogenous group, with wide-ranging varieties in their properties. The medium- to large-sized shells are fusiform to biconic in shape. Their size has a wide range (between 5 mm and 80 mm). The shell can be longitudinally coarsely ribbed, but axial ribs are sometimes obsolete to absent. The smooth columella has a strong (one to three plicae) to obsolete plication upon the middle. This plication varies within genera. In the genus Cordiera there are two columellar plaits. The aperture is elliptical to oval in shape and it has a short to moderately long (e.g. Zemacies excelsa) siphonal canal and a deep anal sinus. The anterior canal has a moderate length and is slightly twisted to the left. The thin outer lip is arcuate. The vestigial or fully developed operculum has a terminal nucleus, and may be missing in some species. The radula is absent in the genus Zemacies.

== Genera ==
- Antarctospira Kantor, Harasewych & Puillandre, 2016
- Apaturris Iredale, 1917
- Aphanitoma Bellardi, 1875
- † Asthenotoma Harris & Burrows, 1891
- Austroturris Laseron, 1954
- Awateria Suter, 1917
- Bathytoma Harris & Burrows, 1891
- † Belatomina Powell, 1944
- Belaturricula Powell, 1951
- † Boettgeriola Wenz, 1943
- Borsonella Dall, 1908
- Borsonellopsis McLean, 1971
- Borsonia Bellardi, 1839
- Cordieria Rouault, 1848
- Darbya Bartsch, 1934
- Diptychophlia Berry, 1964
- Drilliola Locard, 1897
- Filodrillia Hedley, 1922
- Genota H. Adams & A. Adams, 1853
- Glyptaesopus Pilsbry & Olsson, 1941
- Heteroturris Powell, 1967
- Maoritomella Powell, 1942
- Microdrillia Casey, 1903
- Ophiodermella Bartsch, 1944
- Paraborsonia Pilsbry, 1922
- Phenatoma Finlay, 1924
- † Pseudotoma Bellardi, 1875
- Pulsarella Laseron, 1954
- Retidrillia McLean, 2000
- Suavodrillia Dall, 1918
- Tomopleura Casey, 1904
- Tropidoturris Kilburn, 1986
- Typhlodaphne Powell, 1951
- Typhlomangelia G.O. Sars, 1878
- Zemacies Finlay, 1926

Genera brought into synonymy

- Acamptogenotia Rovereto, 1899: synonym of † Pseudotoma Bellardi, 1875 (junior objective synonym, unnecessary substitute name for Pseudotoma, by Rovereto believed to be a junior homonym of "Pseudotoma Stephens, 1852", obviously an error for Pseudotomia Stephens, 1829 [Lepidoptera].)
- Acrobela Thiele, 1925 : synonym of Microdrillia Casey, 1903
- Acropota F. Nordsieck, 1977: synonym of Microdrillia Casey, 1903
- Boettgeria Peyrot, 1931 : synonym of Boettgeriola Wenz, 1943
- Boettgeriola Wenz, 1943 : synonym of Borsonia Bellardi, 1839
- Genotia P. Fischer, 1883 : synonym of Genota H. Adams & A. Adams, 1853
- Micantapex Iredale, 1936 : synonym of Bathytoma Harris & Burrows, 1891
- Narraweena (gastropod) Laseron, 1954 : synonym of Maoritomella Powell, 1942
- Oligotoma Bellardi, 1875 : synonym of Asthenotoma Harris & Burrows, 1891
- Parabathytoma Shuto, 1961 : synonym of Bathytoma Harris & Burrows, 1891
- Riuguhdrillia Oyama, 1951 : synonym of Bathytoma Harris & Burrows, 1891
- Vexithara Finlay, 1926 : synonym of Typhlomangelia G.O. Sars, 1878
- Viridoturris Powell, 1964 : synonym of Typhlomangelia G.O. Sars, 1878
