= Austrotoma prolixa =

Scientific classification
- Kingdom: Animalia
- Phylum: Mollusca
- Class: Gastropoda
- Subclass: Caenogastropoda
- Order: Neogastropoda
- Family: Pseudomelatomidae
- Genus: Austrotoma
- Species: †A. prolixa

Binomial name
- †Austrotoma prolixa Laws, 1940

Species of gastropod

Austrotoma prolixa is an extinct species of sea snail, a marine gastropod mollusk in the family Pseudotomidae.

== Description ==
The shell is noticeably attenuated, featuring straight-sided whorls and a subsutural fold that ranges from weak to moderate in strength. The shoulder carina is sharply angled, while the spirals on the base are widely spaced.

== Distribution ==
Fossils have been found in Lower Pliocene strata at Hawera, New Zealand.
