= Austrotoma deducta =

Scientific classification
- Kingdom: Animalia
- Phylum: Mollusca
- Class: Gastropoda
- Subclass: Caenogastropoda
- Order: Neogastropoda
- Family: Pseudomelatomidae
- Genus: Austrotoma
- Species: †A. deducta

Binomial name
- †Austrotoma deducta Marwick, 1931

Species of gastropod

Austrotoma deducta is an extinct species of sea snail, a marine gastropod mollusk in the family Pseudotomidae.

== Description ==
The subsutural fold is weak to moderately developed, while the spiral sculpture remains the dominant feature across the entire shell. Axial elements are absent on the body whorl, with approximately 16 present on each preceding whorl. The spire is relatively low, measuring less in height than the aperture.

== Distribution ==
Fossils have been found in Upper Miocene strata at Gisborne, New Zealand.
