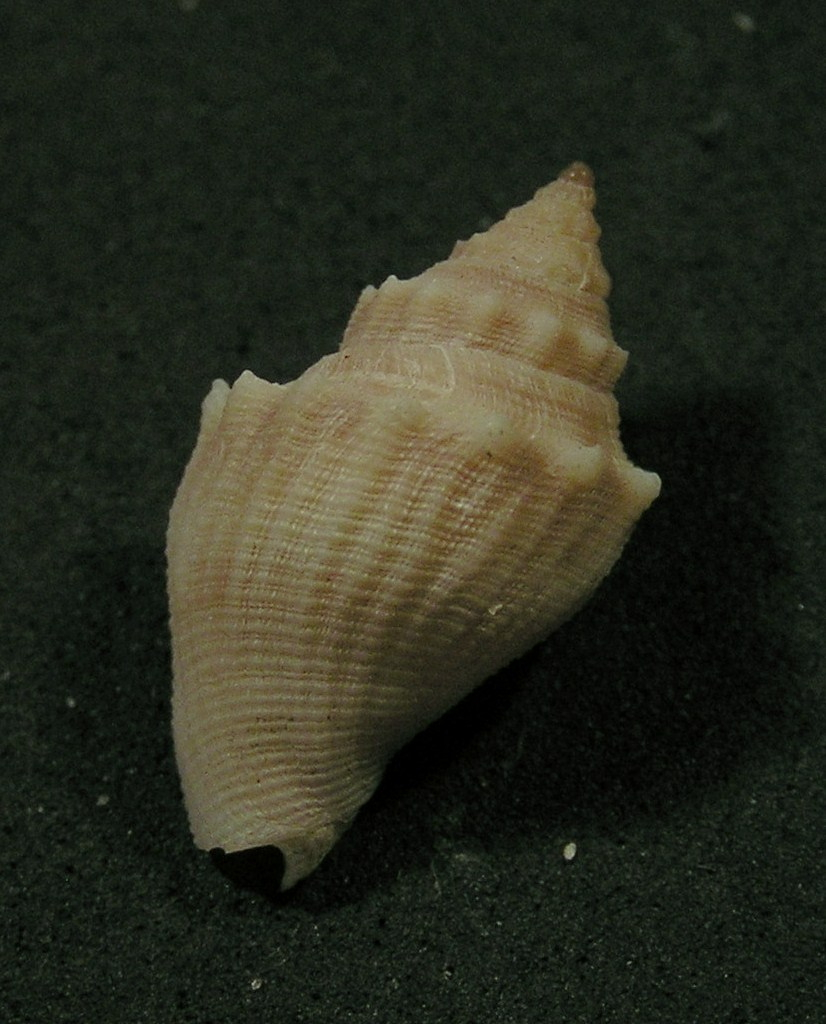
- Shell of Austrotoma aguayoi

Scientific classification
- Kingdom: Animalia
- Phylum: Mollusca
- Class: Gastropoda
- Subclass: Caenogastropoda
- Order: Neogastropoda
- Family: Pseudomelatomidae
- Genus: Austrotoma
- Species: A. aguayoi

Binomial name
- Austrotoma aguayoi (Carcelles, 1953)

Synonyms
- Clathurella aguayoi Carcelles, 1953; Pleurotomella aguayoi (Carcelles, 1953)

= Austrotoma aguayoi =

Species of gastropod

Austrotoma aguayoi is a species of sea snail, a marine gastropod mollusk in the family Pseudomelatomidae. The genus Austrotoma has also been placed in the family Pseudotomidae.

It has an average shell size of 20–40 mm. Its habitat ranges from East Brazil to Southern Argentina.
