= Austrotoma ventricosa =

Scientific classification
- Kingdom: Animalia
- Phylum: Mollusca
- Class: Gastropoda
- Subclass: Caenogastropoda
- Order: Neogastropoda
- Family: Pseudomelatomidae
- Genus: Austrotoma
- Species: †A. ventricosa

Binomial name
- †Austrotoma ventricosa Stilwell & Zinsmeister, 1992

Species of gastropod

Austrotoma ventricosa is an extinct species of sea snail, a marine gastropod mollusk in the family Pseudotomidae. .

== Distribution ==
Fossils have been found in Lower Tertiary strata at Seymour Island, Antarctic Peninsula.
