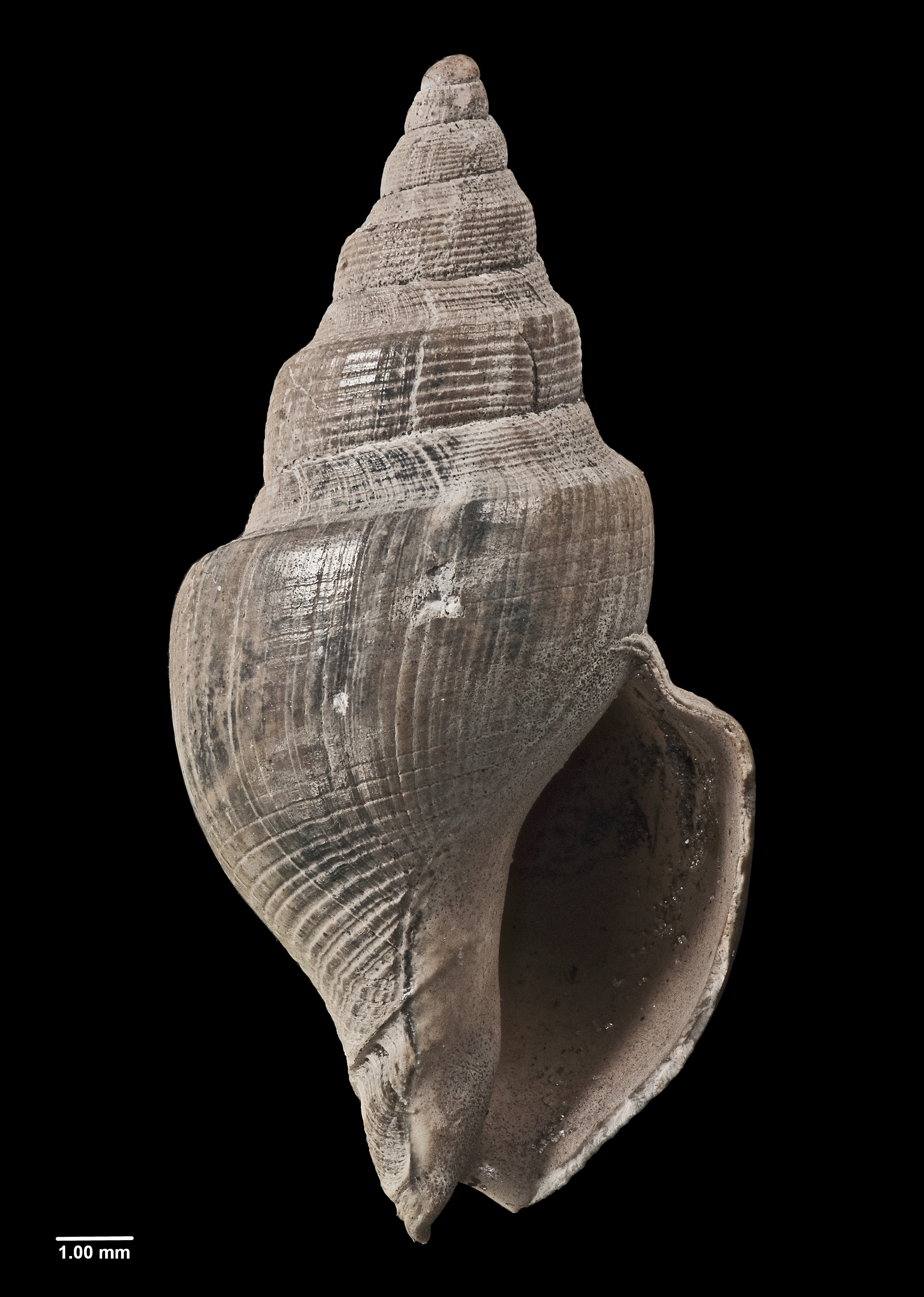
- Holotype of Liratomina adelaidensis

Scientific classification
- Kingdom: Animalia
- Phylum: Mollusca
- Class: Gastropoda
- Subclass: Caenogastropoda
- Order: Neogastropoda
- Superfamily: Conoidea
- Genus: †Liratomina; Powell, 1942

Type species
- † Bela sculptilis

= Liratomina =

Liratomina Temporal range: Oligocene–late Pliocene

Genus of gastropods

Liratomina is a genus of minute gastropod molluscs belonging to the superfamily Conoidea, currently unassigned to a family. The genus is a fossil taxon, known to occur between the Oligocene and the late Pliocene, in fossil beds in Australia.

== Description ==
In 1944, Powell described the genus as follows:

Moderately large, fusiform-turreted shells with crisp spiral and axial sculpture, the spirals predominant, Protoconch large, smooth and rounded, of 1 1/2 whorls, followed by a half-whorl of closely spaced, fine brephic axials. Post-nuclear whorls are rounded, with a concave shoulder, but no subsutural fold. There is superficial resemblance to both Belophos and Austrotoma, but the protoconchs are quite dissimilar.

Members of the genus range in size between 30 and 35 mm (1.2 and 1.4 in) in height. Liratomina and Belatomina can be differentiated due to differences in teleoconches and the presence of a paucispiral protoconch in Liratomina.

== Taxonomy ==
The genus was first described by A. W. B. Powell in 1942, after Powell identified that Bela sculptilis (now known as Liratomina sculptilis) had unique features separating it from its previously assigned genus. The genus was placed in the order Neogastropoda by Jack Sepkoski in posthumous work published in 2002.

== Distribution ==
Liratomina fossils have been found in the Eucla Basin, Otway Basin, and St Vincent Basin of Australia, and date to between the Oligocene and the late Pliocene.

== Species ==
Species within the genus Liratomina include:

- † Liratomina adelaidensis A. W. B. Powell, 1944
- † Liratomina crassilirata (Tate, 1888)
- † Liratomina sculptilis (Tate, 1888)
