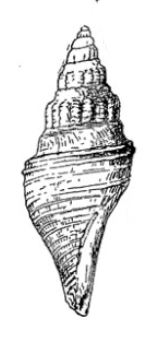
- Shell of Austrotoma inaequabilis (holotype)

Scientific classification
- Kingdom: Animalia
- Phylum: Mollusca
- Class: Gastropoda
- Subclass: Caenogastropoda
- Order: Neogastropoda
- Family: Pseudomelatomidae
- Genus: Austrotoma
- Species: †A. inaequabilis

Binomial name
- †Austrotoma inaequabilis Marwick, 1929

= Austrotoma inaequabilis =

Species of gastropod

Austrotoma inaequabilis is an extinct species of sea snail, a marine gastropod mollusk in the family Pseudotomidae.

== Description ==
The height of the holotype attains (estimated) 35 mm, its diameter 13 mm.

(Original description) The shell is of moderate size and solid construction, with the spire approximately equal in height to the aperture. It comprises about six post-embryonic whorls, each angled above the middle and shaped with a concave shoulder and nearly vertical sides. The body whorl tapers gradually into a straight neck, which carries a strongly developed fasciole marked by a rounded median ridge along the inner margin of the narrow anterior notch.

In terms of sculpture, the body whorl bears two prominent, well-spaced spiral cords along the periphery. Above these, the concave shoulder is ornamented with fine spiral threads, while below, a further strong spiral emerges near the suture, forming the uppermost of roughly fourteen spirals extending down to the fasciole. The upper five of these are noticeably stronger than the lower ones. Between the peripheral and sutural spirals lie three sharply defined secondary spirals: the upper two sit relatively close together with a fine thread between them, while the lower pair are separated by three similar threads, along with a single thread between the lowest and the sutural spiral. The interspaces between the stronger spirals on the base and neck also contain fine spiral threads. The sides of the body whorl show only faint, nearly obsolete axial ribs. All interspaces are crossed by delicate spiral threads, which are further reticulated by regular growth lines.

On the spire whorls, moderately strong axial ribs — about sixteen per whorl — are intersected by two spaced spirals at the shoulder angle, along with six weaker spirals along the sides, of which alternate ones are of secondary strength. The suture is appressed.

The aperture features a deep and narrow anterior notch. The outer lip forms a broadly concave sinus at the shoulder before sweeping forward in a wide convex curve along the side and base. The columella is smooth and gently curved toward the siphonal canal. The inner lip is clearly defined and excavated, not entirely concealing the two folds formed by the margins of the apertural notch.

== Distribution ==
Fossils have been found in Upper Oliocene strata at Chatton, Southland, New Zealand.
