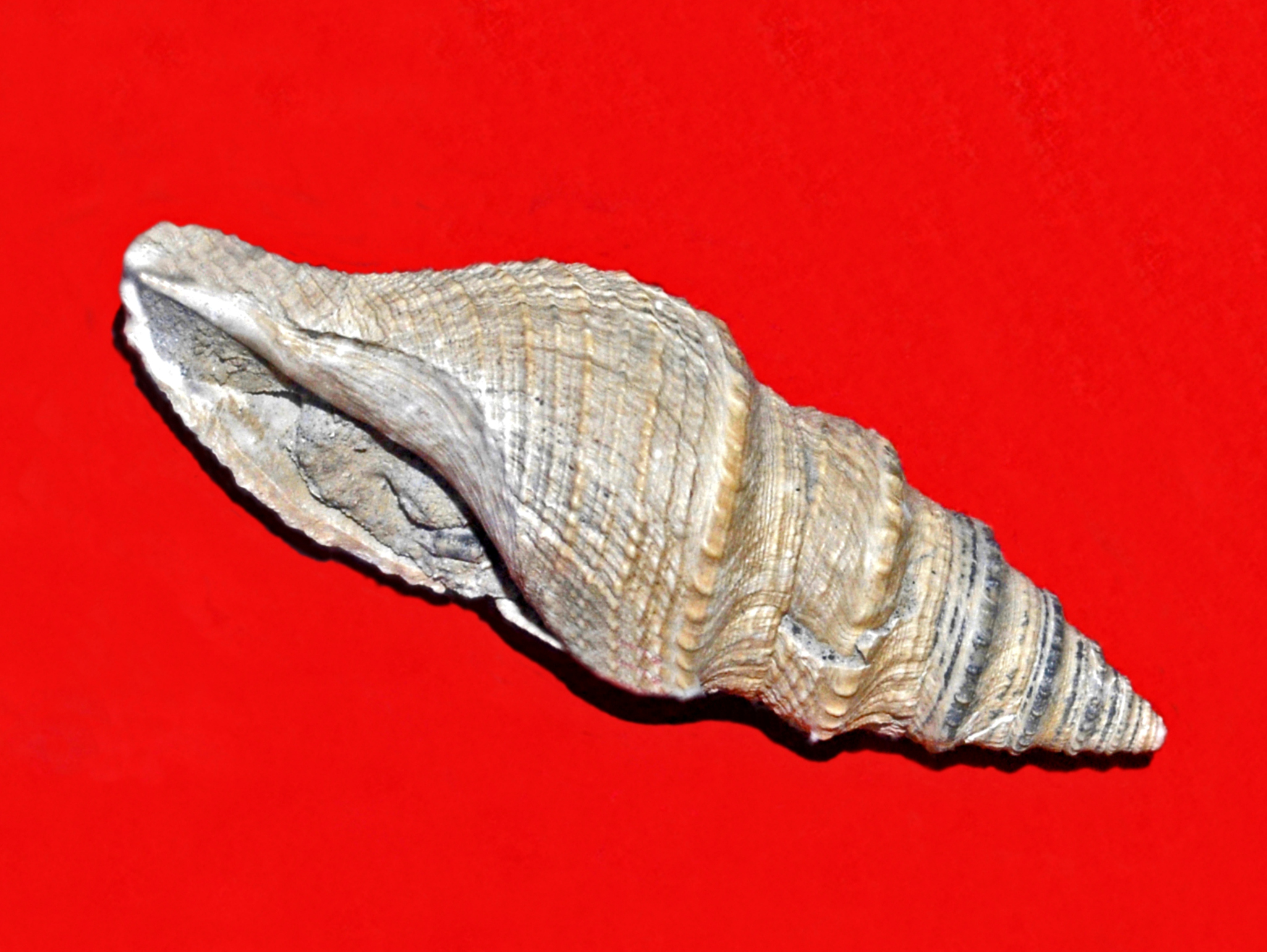
- Fossil shell of Pseudotoma intorta

Scientific classification
- Kingdom: Animalia
- Phylum: Mollusca
- Class: Gastropoda
- Subclass: Caenogastropoda
- Order: Neogastropoda
- Superfamily: Conoidea
- Family: †Pseudotomidae
- Genus: †Pseudotoma; Rovereto, 1899

Type species
- † Murex intortus Brocchi, 1814

Synonyms
- Pseudotoma Rovereto, 1899 junior objective synonym (unnecessary substitute name for Pseudotoma, by Rovereto believed to be a junior homonym of "Pseudotoma Stephens, 1852", obviously an error for Pseudotomia Stephens, 1829 [Lepidoptera].); Genota (Pseudotoma) Bellardi, 1875; Genotia (Pseudotoma) Bellardi, 1875; Pleurotoma (Pseudotoma) Bellardi, 1875; † Pseudotomina Finaly, 1924

= Pseudotoma =

Pseudotoma Temporal range: Paleocene-Pliocene

Extinct genus of gastropods

Pseudotoma is an extinct genus of predatory sea snails, marine gastropod mollusks belonging to the family Pseudotomidae.

First appearing 48.6 Ma and believed to go extinct 7.2 Ma. Specimens of Pseudotoma have been found in Austria, Denmark, Germany, The Netherlands, The UK, and The continental United States. The Pseudotoma lived during the Paleocene epoch of Denmark and Greenland, The Oligocene epoch of Mexico, and in the Pliocene epoch of Italy

== Description ==
The ovate, fusiform, shell is short and stout. The spire is about the length of the aperture. The columella is straight, very short, axis impervious. The siphonal canal is very short and wide. The anal sulcus is wide, moderately deep, close to the suture. The spiral sculpture is feeble. The axial sculpture consists of moderately strong riblets. The operculum is wide, ovate, with apical nucleus. The type species is Pleurotoma intorta described by Brocchi in 1814.

== Species ==
- †Pseudotoma alazana (Cooke 1928)
- † Pseudotoma bonellii (Bellardi, 1847)
- †Pseudotoma colpophora Cossmann, 1889
- †Pseudotoma coronata (Lamarck, 1803) (synonym: Fusus coronatus Lamarck, 1803)
- † Pseudotoma escheri (Mayer, 1861)
- † Pseudotoma genei (Bellardi, 1847)
- † Pseudotoma giselae R. Hoernes & Auinger, 1891
- †Pseudotoma heilprini Aldrich 1885
- †Pseudotoma intorta Brocchi 1814
- †Pseudotoma liancurtensis (de Boury, 1899) (synonym: Genotia liancurtensis)de Boury, 1899
- †Pseudotoma loustaui (Deshayes, 1865)
- † Pseudotoma pluriplicata (Cossmann, 1902)
- † Pseudotoma praecedens Bellardi, 1877
- †Pseudotoma quieta (Deshayes, 1865)
- † Pseudotoma subintorta (d'Orbigny, 1852)
- † Pseudotoma subspinosa O. Boettger, 1896

Synonyms

- † Pseudotoma huttoni Finlay, 1924: synonym of † Austrotoma suteri (Cossmann, 1916)
