= Austrotoma clifdenica =

Scientific classification
- Kingdom: Animalia
- Phylum: Mollusca
- Class: Gastropoda
- Subclass: Caenogastropoda
- Order: Neogastropoda
- Family: Pseudomelatomidae
- Genus: Austrotoma
- Species: †A. clifdenica

Binomial name
- †Austrotoma clifdenica A. W. B. Powell, 1942

Species of gastropod

Austrotoma clifdenica is an extinct species of sea snail, a marine gastropod mollusk in the family Pseudotomidae.

== Description ==
The holotype has a shell length of 36.7 mm, (estimated) 84 mm; its diameter 15.2mm.

== Distribution ==
Fossils have been found in Lower Miocene strata at Southland, New Zealand.
