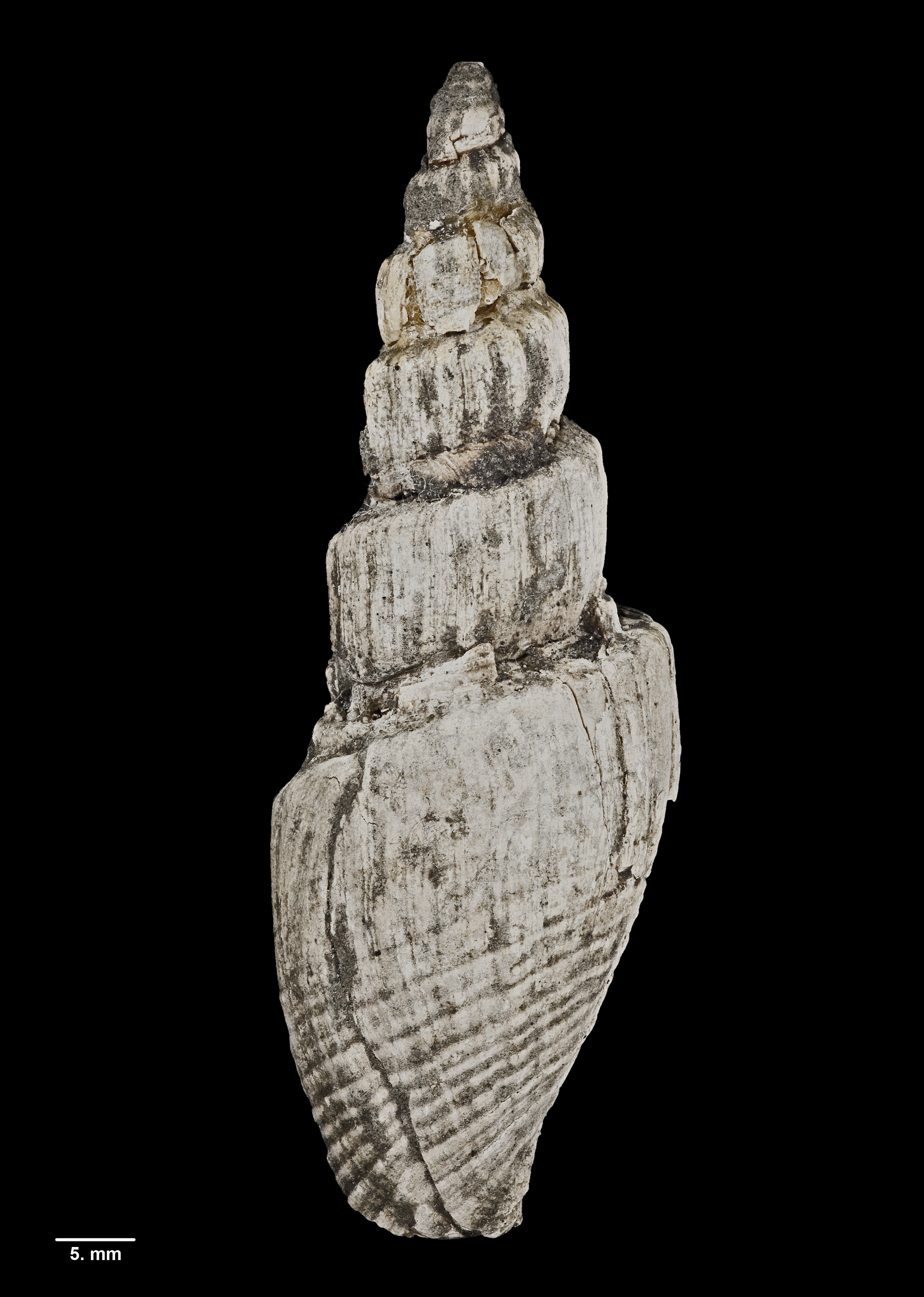
- Holotype from Auckland War Memorial Museum

Scientific classification
- Kingdom: Animalia
- Phylum: Mollusca
- Class: Gastropoda
- Subclass: Caenogastropoda
- Order: Neogastropoda
- Family: †Pseudotomidae
- Genus: †Zeatoma
- Species: †Z. austrotomoides

Binomial name
- †Zeatoma austrotomoides (A. W. B. Powell, 1931)

Synonyms
- Marshallena austrotomoides A. W. B. Powell, 1931

= Zeatoma austrotomoides =

Zeatoma austrotomoides Temporal range: late Pliocene

Extinct species of gastropod

Zeatoma austrotomoides is an extinct species of sea snail, a marine gastropod mollusc in the family Pseudotomidae. Fossils of the species date to late Pliocene strata of the Tangahoe Formation in New Zealand.

== Description ==
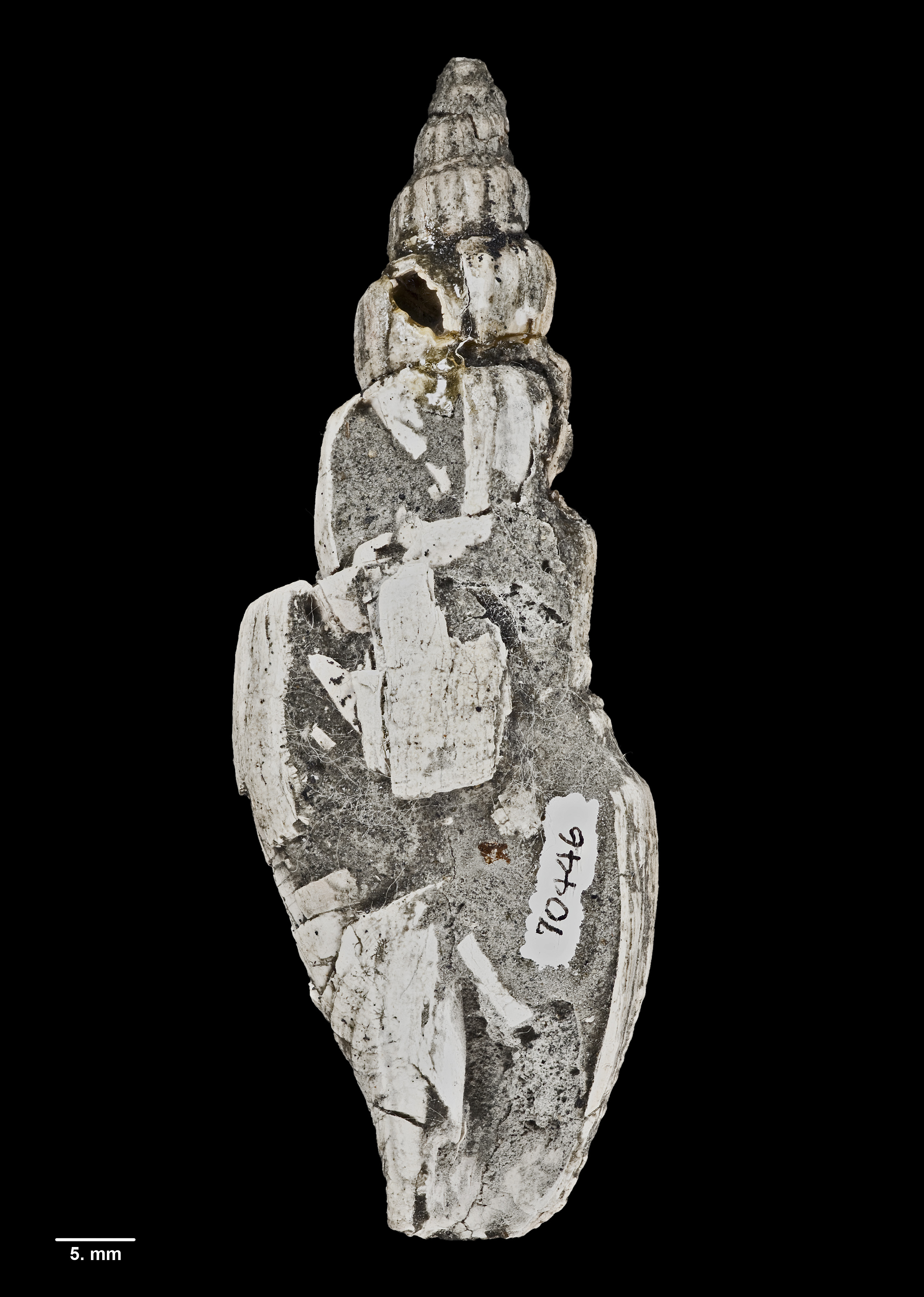
Damaged front view of holotype

In the original description, Powell described the species as follows:

Shell very large, with a tall gradate spire, estimated to be a little taller than height of aperture. Post-embryonic whorls seven, angled at about three-fourths their height, with a concave shoulder above and vertical sides below. Body-whorl large, slightly inflated above and contracting slowly over base. Although the end of the canal is missing in both specimens, the growth lines indicate the absence of an anterior notch. There is also a simple shallow arcuate posterior sinus typical of Marshallena and quite unlike that of Austrotoma, to which genus the Hawera shell is superficially similar. Sculpture of strong forwardly-inclined axials, which become subobsolete on the body-whorl. The spiral sculpture is also subobsolete, being traceable with difficulty on the spire whorls and upper part of body-whorl, although it becomes moderately strong on the base. The axials number about fourteen on the spire whorls, and the subobsolete spirals about nine. The body-whorl has about twenty irregularly developed spiral cords, which are subobsolete above, but become rather strongly developed below, where they are broad and rounded, with two or three spiral threads per interspace. Shoulder concave with broadly arcuate lines of growth corresponding to the simple shallow sinus.

The holotype of the species has an estimated height of 78 mm (3.1 in) in height, and a diameter of 24 mm (0.94 in). The species can be distinguished from Z. celsa due to being smaller, having a shorter spire, with more numerous axials that extend over the body-whorl. It can be distinguished from other members of Zeatoma due to its large shell size, having a spire taller than its aperture, the shell being straight-sided below the angle, and due to having 14 axials per whorl.

== Taxonomy ==
The species was first described by A. W. B. Powell in 1931 as Marshallena austrotomoides. It was moved to the genus Zeatoma in 1992 by Phillip A. Maxwell. The holotype was collected in January 1931 from near the mouth of Waihi Stream near Hāwera, Taranaki, and is held in the collections of Auckland War Memorial Museum.

== Distribution ==
This extinct marine species occurs in late Pliocene (Waipipian) strata of the Tangahoe Formation, primarily associated with the Taranaki and Manawatū–Whanganui regions of New Zealand. Fossils of the species have been found near Hāwera, Taranaki, along the Awatere River of Marlborough District, and along the Makaretu River at Opoiti in the Wairoa District.
