= Austrotoma antarctica =

Scientific classification
- Kingdom: Animalia
- Phylum: Mollusca
- Class: Gastropoda
- Subclass: Caenogastropoda
- Order: Neogastropoda
- Family: Pseudomelatomidae
- Genus: Austrotoma
- Species: †A. antarctica

Binomial name
- †Austrotoma antarctica Karczewski, 1985

Species of gastropod

Austrotoma antarctica is an extinct species of sea snail, a marine gastropod mollusk in the family Pseudotomidae.

== Distribution ==
Fossils have been found in Lower Miocene strata at King George Island, West Antarctica.
