= Austrotoma eximia =

Scientific classification
- Kingdom: Animalia
- Phylum: Mollusca
- Class: Gastropoda
- Subclass: Caenogastropoda
- Order: Neogastropoda
- Family: Pseudomelatomidae
- Genus: Austrotoma
- Species: †A. eximia

Binomial name
- †Austrotoma eximia (Suter, 1917)

Synonyms
- † Bathytoma eximia Suter, 1917 (superseded combination)

Species of gastropod

Austrotoma eximia is an extinct species of sea snail, a marine gastropod mollusk in the family Pseudotomidae.

== Description ==
The shell features a subsutural fold that ranges from weak to moderate in prominence. Its spiral sculpture is dominant entirely to the base, there are 14 axial ribs per whorl. These become subobsolete over the body whorl. The spirals are narrow and not strong.

== Distribution ==
Fossils have been found in Upper Oligocene strata at Otago, New Zealand.
