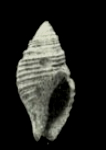
- Shell of Austrotoma obsoleta (holotype)

Scientific classification
- Kingdom: Animalia
- Phylum: Mollusca
- Class: Gastropoda
- Subclass: Caenogastropoda
- Order: Neogastropoda
- Family: Pseudomelatomidae
- Genus: Austrotoma
- Species: †A. obsoleta

Binomial name
- †Austrotoma obsoleta H. J. Finlay, 1926

= Austrotoma obsoleta =

Extinct species of gastropod

Austrotoma obsoleta is an extinct species of sea snail, a marine gastropod mollusc, in the family Pseudomelatomidae.

== Description ==
The length of the shell attains 26.5 mm, its diameter 12.5 mm.

(Original description) The shell retains the general characteristics of † Austrotoma minor (Finlay, 1924), though it is shorter and its axial ribs are only faintly visible on the first few whorls. Along the spire-whorls, seven spiral cords run distinctly: the upper three merge into a pronounced subsutural ridge, followed by a narrow, deeply concave, and smooth sinus space, beneath which lie four additional cords.

On the body whorl, between this sinus space, there are twelve to fourteen spirals, separated by broad, deep interstices that are sometimes threaded with finer interstitial lines. The shell itself appears squat, with a spire that is shorter than the aperture. The columella is more deeply excavated above than in the preceding species, and the siphonal canal is correspondingly shorter, while all other features remain essentially the same.

== Distribution ==
This extinct marine species occurs in the Upper Miocene strata near North Canterbury, New Zealand.
