= Austrotoma nervosa =

Scientific classification
- Kingdom: Animalia
- Phylum: Mollusca
- Class: Gastropoda
- Subclass: Caenogastropoda
- Order: Neogastropoda
- Family: Pseudomelatomidae
- Genus: Austrotoma
- Species: †A. nervosa

Binomial name
- †Austrotoma nervosa A. W. B. Powell, 1942

Species of gastropod

Austrotoma nervosa is an extinct species of sea snail, a marine gastropod mollusk in the family Pseudotomidae.

== Description ==
The holotype has a shell length of 44 mm; its (actual) diameter 15mm, (estimated diameter 16 mm).

== Distribution ==
Fossils have been found in Middle Miocene strata at Mōkau, North Island, New Zealand.
