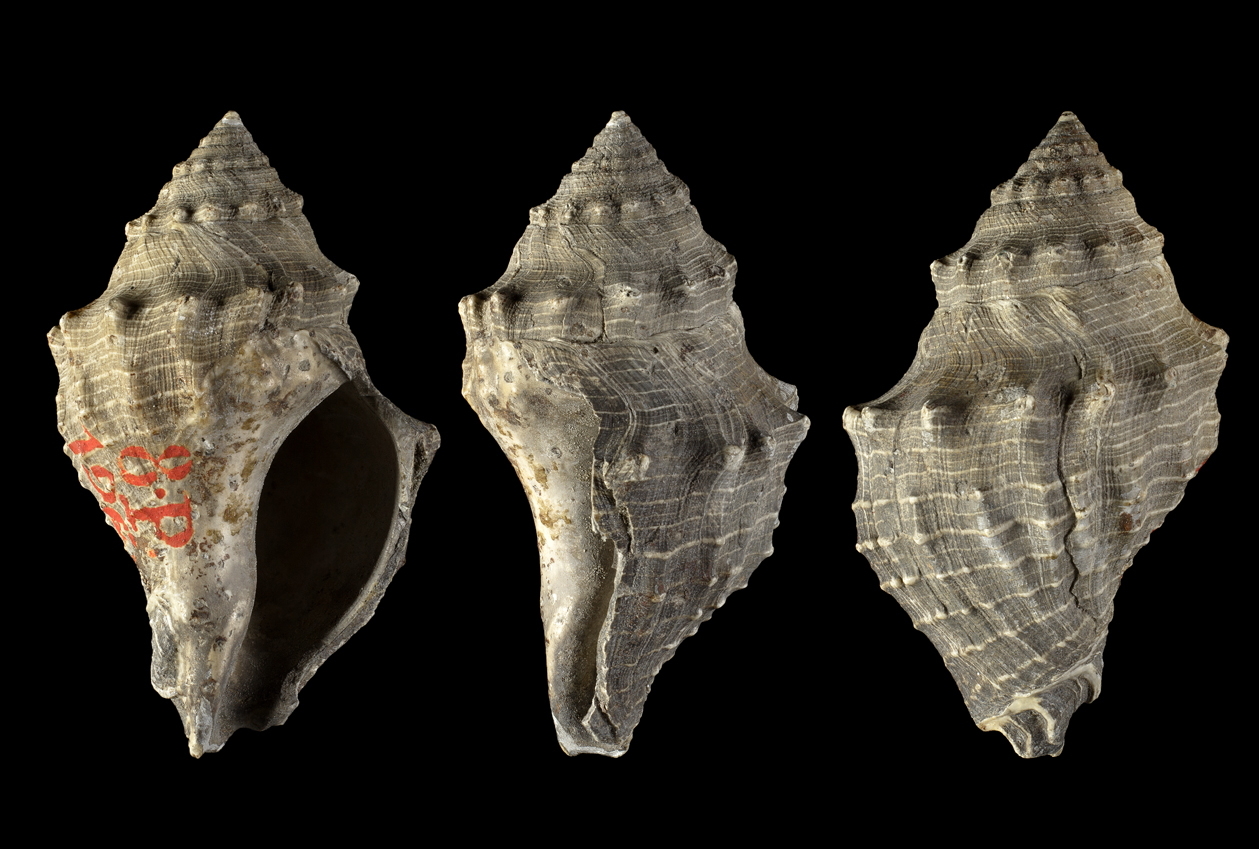
- Shell of † Austrotoma echinulata (syntype at MNHN, Paris)

Scientific classification
- Kingdom: Animalia
- Phylum: Mollusca
- Class: Gastropoda
- Subclass: Caenogastropoda
- Order: Neogastropoda
- Family: Pseudomelatomidae
- Genus: Austrotoma
- Species: †A. echinulata

Binomial name
- †Austrotoma echinulata (Hupé, 1854)

Synonyms
- † Fusus echinulatus Hupé, 1845 superseded combination; † Fusus turbinelloides (G. B. Sowerby I, 1846); † Pleurotoma turbinelloides G. B. Sowerby I, 1846

= Austrotoma echinulata =

Species of gastropod

Austrotoma echinulata is an extinct species of sea snail, a marine gastropod mollusk in the family Pseudotomidae. .

== Description ==
It has an average shell size of 20–40 mm.

(Original description in Spanish) The shell is turbinate and oval, appearing distinctly swollen in the middle. The spire is moderately elevated and conical, yet somewhat inflated, and it terminates in a sharp, mucronate apex. It consists of six smooth whorls that are channeled at the top; near the midpoint of these whorls, there is a quite pronounced angle adorned with a row of raised, conical, and sharp tubercles.

On the body whorl, this angle is even more sharply defined. Beneath the primary row of tubercles, there are several obsolete longitudinal ribs, upon which rows of transverse tubercles emerge. These smaller tubercles are also conical but are much more diminutive than those above them, gradually decreasing in size as they reach the siphonal canal. In this area, the surface is further textured with transverse striae.

The siphonal canal itself is short and slightly contoured. The aperture is oval-oblong in shape, with a columella with a notably thick left margin. The right margin, however, is thin, sharp, and flexuous, and the upper portion is characterized by a slight notch or emargination.

== Distribution ==
Fossils haven been found in Miocene strata in Chile.
