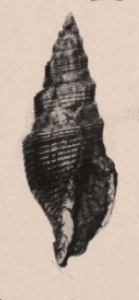
- Shell of Austrotoma finlayi (holotype)

Scientific classification
- Kingdom: Animalia
- Phylum: Mollusca
- Class: Gastropoda
- Subclass: Caenogastropoda
- Order: Neogastropoda
- Family: Pseudomelatomidae
- Genus: Austrotoma
- Species: †A. finlayi

Binomial name
- †Austrotoma finlayi A. W. B. Powell, 1938

= Austrotoma finlayi =

Species of gastropod

Austrotoma finlayi is an extinct species of sea snail, a marine gastropod mollusk in the family Pseudotomidae.

== Description ==
The shell of the holotype reaches a length of 57 mm and an estimated diameter of 18 mm. (actual: specimen crushed).

(Original description) The shell is rather large and narrowly fusiform in shape, with a spire that is normally not quite as high as the combined length of the aperture and the siphonal canal. It consists of ten whorls, which include a small, smooth, and typically conoid multispiral protoconch of three whorls, followed by a transition of a half-whorl bearing eight fine spirals. The spire whorls are strongly angled and featured a prominent keel situated a little below the middle, while the shoulder is deeply concave.

The sculpture is composed of well-defined, flat-topped spiral cords, with a fine thread occupying each interspace. On the area between the broad, rounded keel and the lower suture, there are two main spirals on the upper whorls and three on the lower whorls. While the keel can be smooth, it is more often composed of three additional, more closely spaced spirals. Between the peripheral keel and the upper suture, the shell is adorned with seven finer cords; the middle four of these are weaker than the pairs situated above and below them.

On the body whorl, fifteen main cords are situated below the keel. The axial sculpture consists of fourteen weak axial folds, which disappear entirely after the fourth post-nuclear whorl. The fasciole is distinct and bounded by a thin, sharply raised cord, and it is further textured with six spiral threads, the upper three of which are the most prominent.

== Distribution ==
Fossils have been found in Lower Miocene strata at Auckland, New Zealand.
