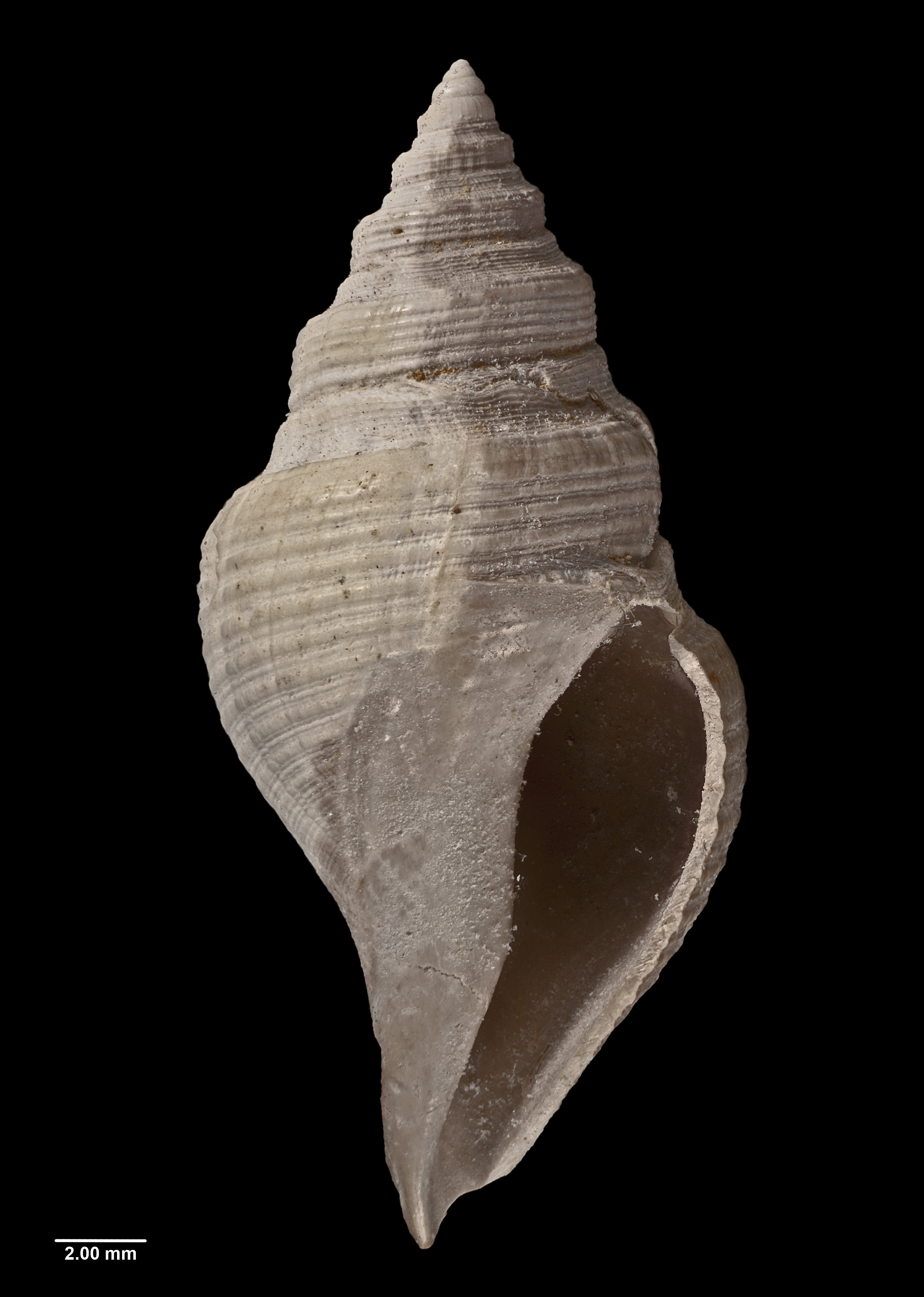
- Holotype from Auckland War Memorial Museum

Scientific classification
- Kingdom: Animalia
- Phylum: Mollusca
- Class: Gastropoda
- Subclass: Caenogastropoda
- Order: Neogastropoda
- Family: Pseudomelatomidae
- Genus: Austrotoma
- Species: †A. janjukiensis

Binomial name
- †Austrotoma janjukiensis A. W. B. Powell, 1944

Synonyms
- Austrotoma janukiensis A. W. B. Powell, 1944

= Austrotoma janjukiensis =

Austrotoma janjukiensis Temporal range: early Miocene

Extinct species of gastropod

Austrotoma janjukiensis is an extinct species of sea snail, a marine gastropod mollusc, in the family Pseudomelatomidae. Fossils of the species date to the early Miocene strata of the Port Phillip Basin of Victoria, Australia.

== Description ==
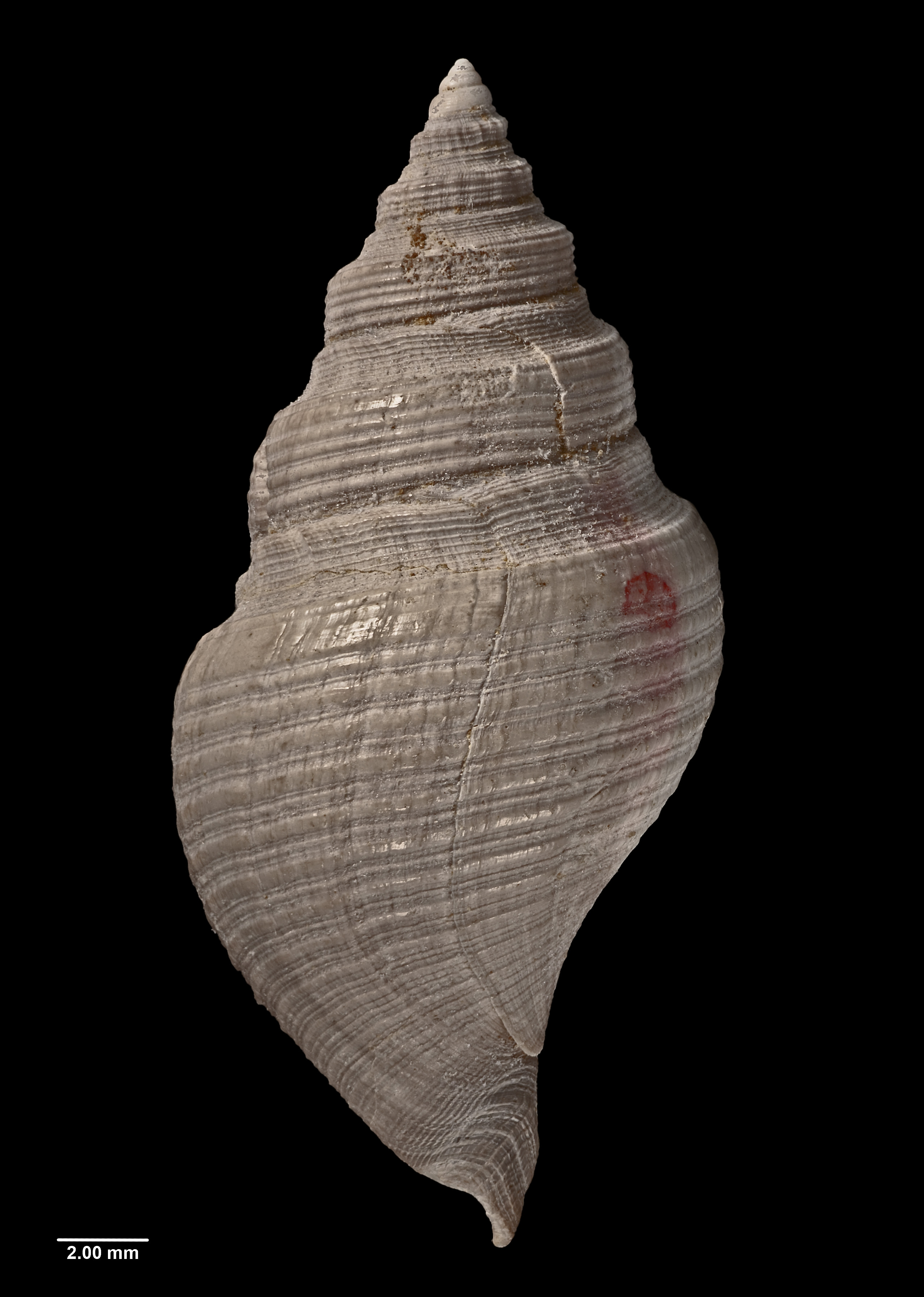
Reverse view of holotype

In the original description, Powell described the species as follows:

Species similar to inexpectata, but without axial folds on the spire. The primary spirals are heavier, more broadly rounded, with a threadin each interspace over most of the base. In inexpectata the spirals are obsolescent on the upper half of the base. There is a moderate subsutural fold. Spire-whorls with 8 spaced, spiral threads on the shoulder, 5 strong rounded cords from shoulder angle to lower suture and about 14 primary cords on the body-whorl. Spiral threads, one per interspace over the upper half of the base, increasing to three below, and finally crowding the neck just above the fasciole. The spire is not much less than the height of the aperture.

The holotype of the species has a height of 26.5 mm (1.04 in), and a diameter of 12.1 mm (0.48 in).

== Taxonomy ==
The species was first described by A. W. B. Powell in 1944. The holotype was collected prior to 1944 from Torquay, Victoria, Australia. It is a part of the H. J. Finlay Collection, which is held by the Auckland War Memorial Museum.

== Distribution ==
This extinct marine species occurs in early Miocene strata of the Port Phillip Basin of Victoria, Australia, including the Puebla Formation.
