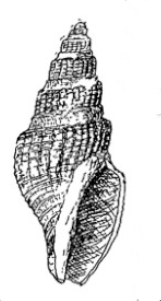
- Shell of Austrotoma toreuma (holotype)

Scientific classification
- Kingdom: Animalia
- Phylum: Mollusca
- Class: Gastropoda
- Subclass: Caenogastropoda
- Order: Neogastropoda
- Family: Pseudomelatomidae
- Genus: Austrotoma
- Species: †A. toreuma

Binomial name
- †Austrotoma toreuma Marwick, 1929

= Austrotoma toreuma =

Species of gastropod

Austrotoma toreuma is an extinct species of sea snail, a marine gastropod mollusk in the family Pseudotomidae.

== Description ==
The height of the holotype attains (estimated) 30 mm, its diameter 12 mm.

(Original description) The shell is of moderate size, with a spire that rises slightly higher than the aperture. It consists of about six post-embryonic whorls, each angled above the middle and shaped with a strongly concave shoulder and nearly vertical sides. The body whorl contracts relatively quickly into a short, almost straight neck, which bears a well-marked fasciole distinguished by a strong median ridge.

The sculpture is well developed, with approximately twenty-five forward-sloping axial ribs on each whorl. These ribs begin at the shoulder angle and gradually fade out toward the base. On the spire whorls, six strong, well-spaced spiral cords cross the surface, while the interspace between the third and fourth cords on the penultimate whorl contains a single finer spiral thread. The shoulder itself carries five spaced spiral threads, of which the outermost is more prominent than the others.

On the body whorl, there are sixteen strong, evenly spaced spiral cords. The upper three lie slightly closer together and tend to become nodulous where they intersect the axial ribs. The shoulder here bears six spiral threads, with the outermost nearly as strong as the cords on the sides and base. The single interstitial thread seen on the penultimate whorl continues onto the body whorl, and an additional thread develops in the interspace immediately below it, while the remaining interspaces lack such secondary threads. Both the shoulder and the interspaces are crossed by strong, regular growth lines. The suture is appressed.

The aperture is oblong in shape and features a deep, narrow anterior notch. The outer lip forms a broad, concave sinus at the shoulder and becomes convex below. The columella is smooth and gently curves toward the siphonal canal. The inner lip is clearly defined and excavated, and it does not entirely obscure the traces of the fasciole.

== Distribution ==
Fossils have been found in Upper Oliocene strata at Chatton, Southland, New Zealand.
