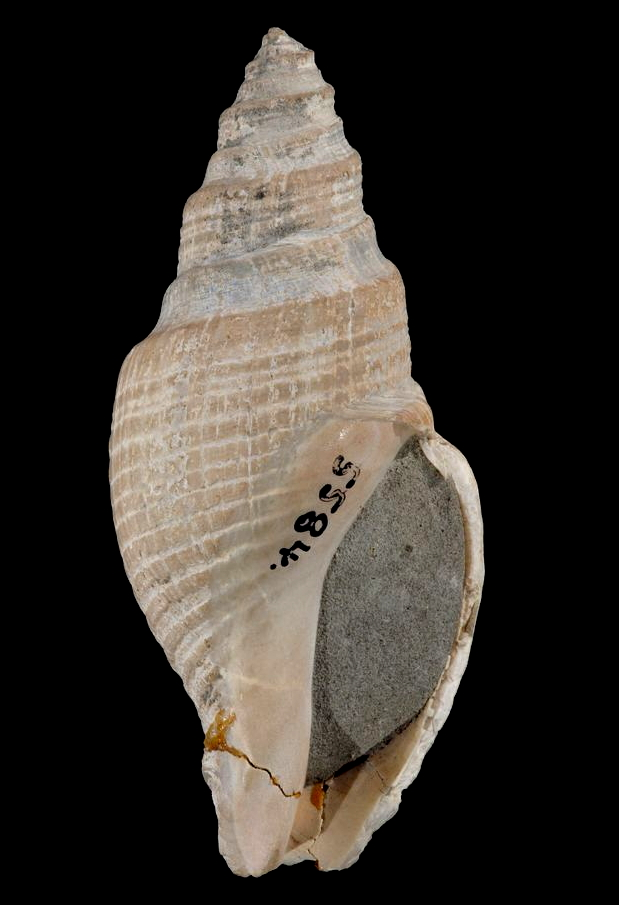
- Shell of † Austrotoma hurupiensis (holotype at the Museum of New Zealand)

Scientific classification
- Kingdom: Animalia
- Phylum: Mollusca
- Class: Gastropoda
- Subclass: Caenogastropoda
- Order: Neogastropoda
- Family: Pseudomelatomidae
- Genus: Austrotoma
- Species: †A. hurupiensis

Binomial name
- †Austrotoma hurupiensis Dell, 1952

= Austrotoma hurupiensis =

Species of gastropod

Austrotoma hurupiensis is an extinct species of sea snail, a marine gastropod mollusk in the family Pseudotomidae.

== Distribution ==
Fossils have been found at Palliser Bay, Putangirua Stream in New Zealand.
