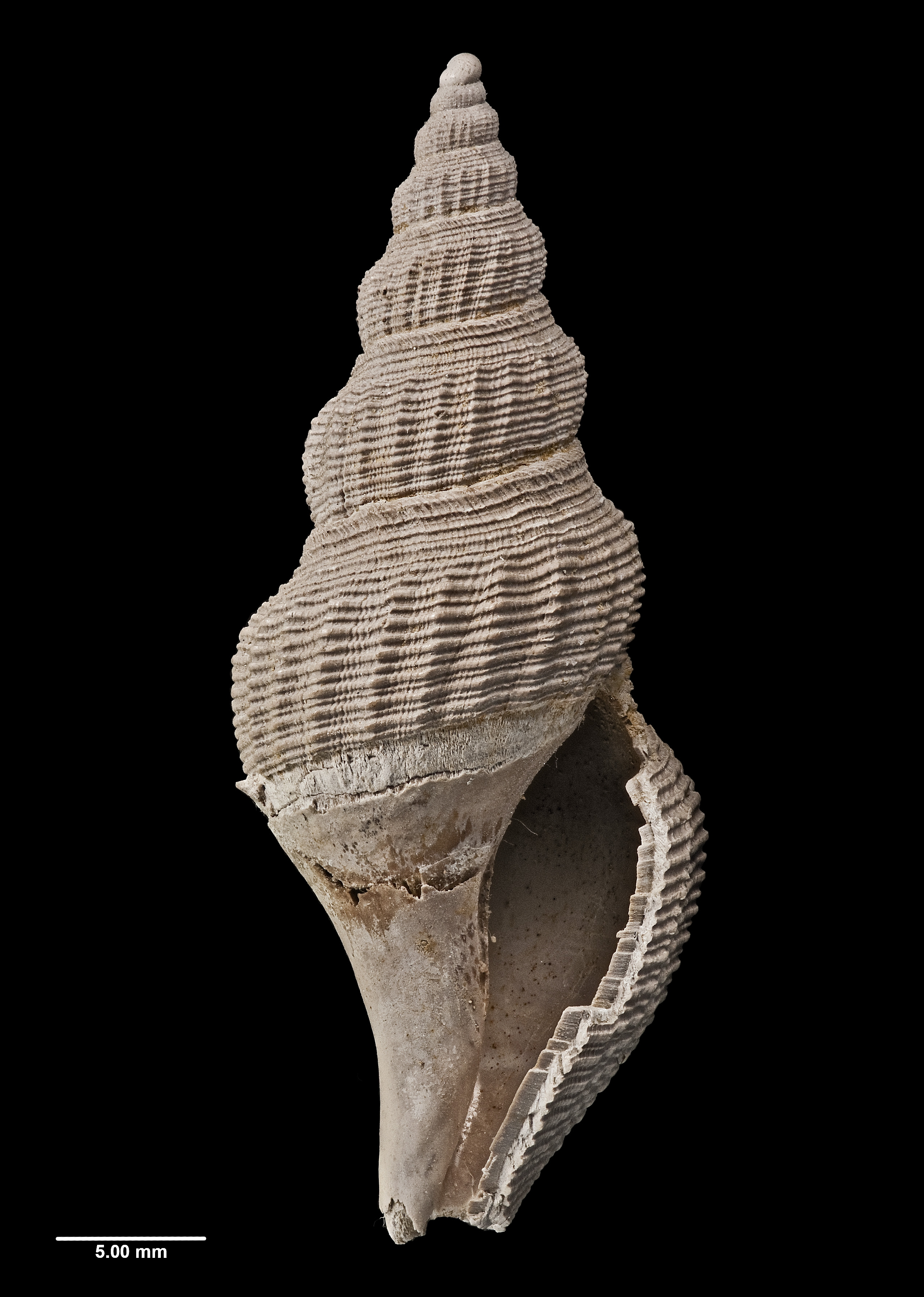
- Holotype from Auckland War Memorial Museum

Scientific classification
- Kingdom: Animalia
- Phylum: Mollusca
- Class: Gastropoda
- Subclass: Caenogastropoda
- Order: Neogastropoda
- Family: Pseudomelatomidae
- Genus: Austrotoma
- Species: †A. intertexta

Binomial name
- †Austrotoma intertexta (A. W. B. Powell, 1944)

Synonyms
- Liratomina intertexta A. W. B. Powell, 1944

= Austrotoma intertexta =

Austrotoma intertexta Temporal range: late Oligocene–early Miocene

Extinct species of gastropod

Austrotoma intertexta is an extinct species of sea snail, a marine gastropod mollusc, in the family Pseudomelatomidae. Fossils of the species date to late Oligocene and early Miocene strata of the Port Phillip Basin of Victoria, Australia.

== Description ==
In the original description, Powell described the species as follows:

Moderately large, fusiform, with turreted spire; whorls 7, including typical, large, smooth, blunt protoconch of 15 whorls. Aperture about half or a little less than half the height of shell. Axials distinct, fold-like, flexuous, extending from shoulder angle to lower suture, becoming obsolete over base, 21 on penultimate. Shoulder broad, deeply concave. Suture with a weak fold below it. Spiral sculpture consisting of four sharply raised narrow cords with some weaker intermediates on the shoulder or posterior sinus area, and six to eight rather strong, narrow, sharply raised cords with intermediates, extending from the shoulder angle to the lower suture. There are about twenty-four primaries and some intermediates on the body-whorl and base. The fasciole bears about nine spaced, narrow, spiral lirations. The whole surface is crowded with fine crisp axial growth lines. The general appearance of the sculpture resembles that of a woven basket.

The holotype of the species has an estimated height of 44 mm (1.7 in), and a diameter of 16.5 mm (0.65 in).

== Taxonomy ==
The species was first described by A. W. B. Powell in 1944, using the name Liratomina intertexta. While the name Liratomina intertexta is accepted by Darragh (1970, 1985 and 2024) the World Register of Marine Species lists the accepted name as Austrotoma intertexta. The holotype was collected prior to 1944 from Torquay, Victoria, Australia. It is a part of the H. J. Finlay Collection, which is held by the Auckland War Memorial Museum.

== Distribution ==
This extinct marine species occurs in late Oligocene and early Miocene strata of the Port Phillip Basin of Victoria, Australia, including the Jan Juc Formation and Puebla Formation.

== Gallery ==
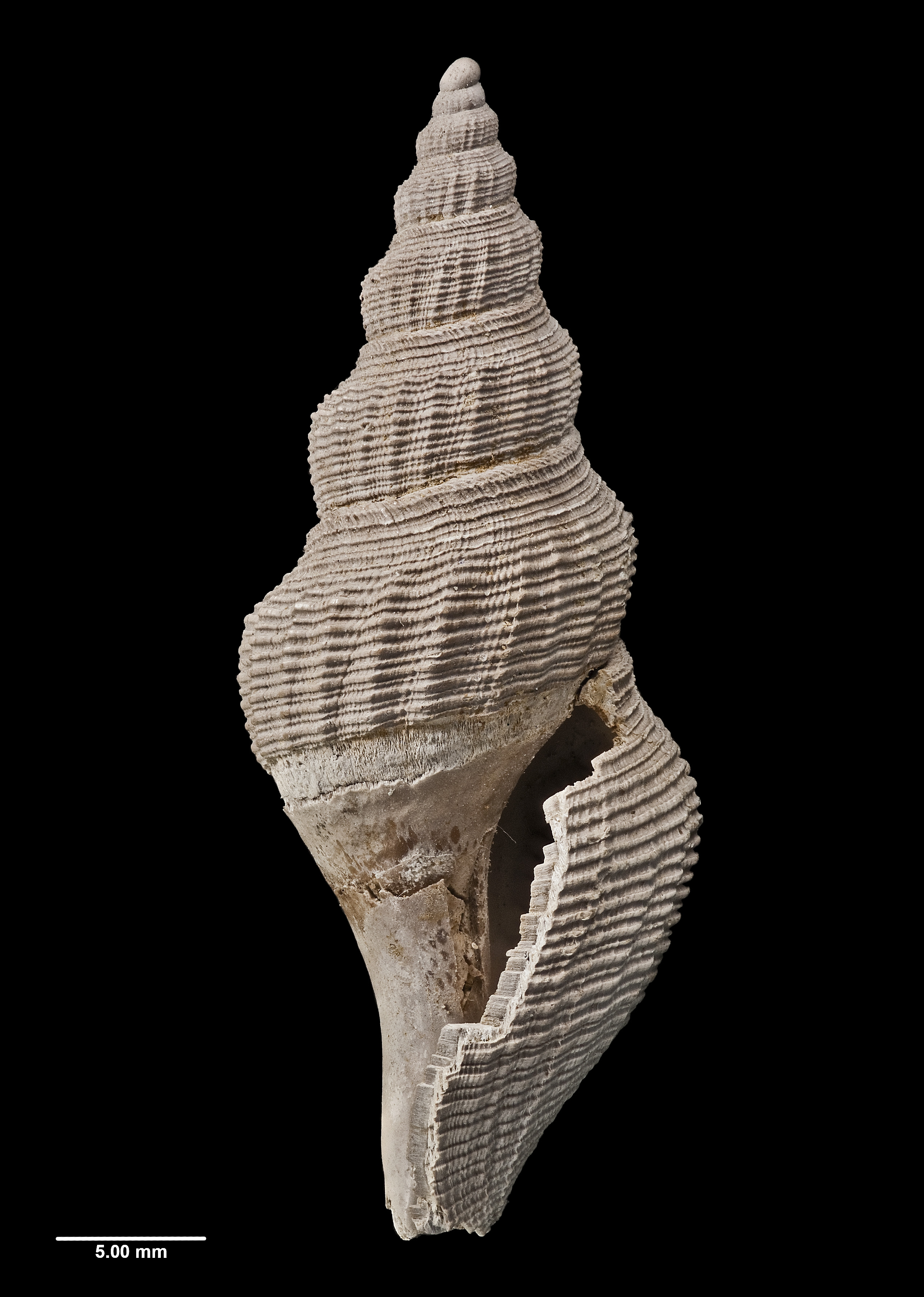
Side view of holotype

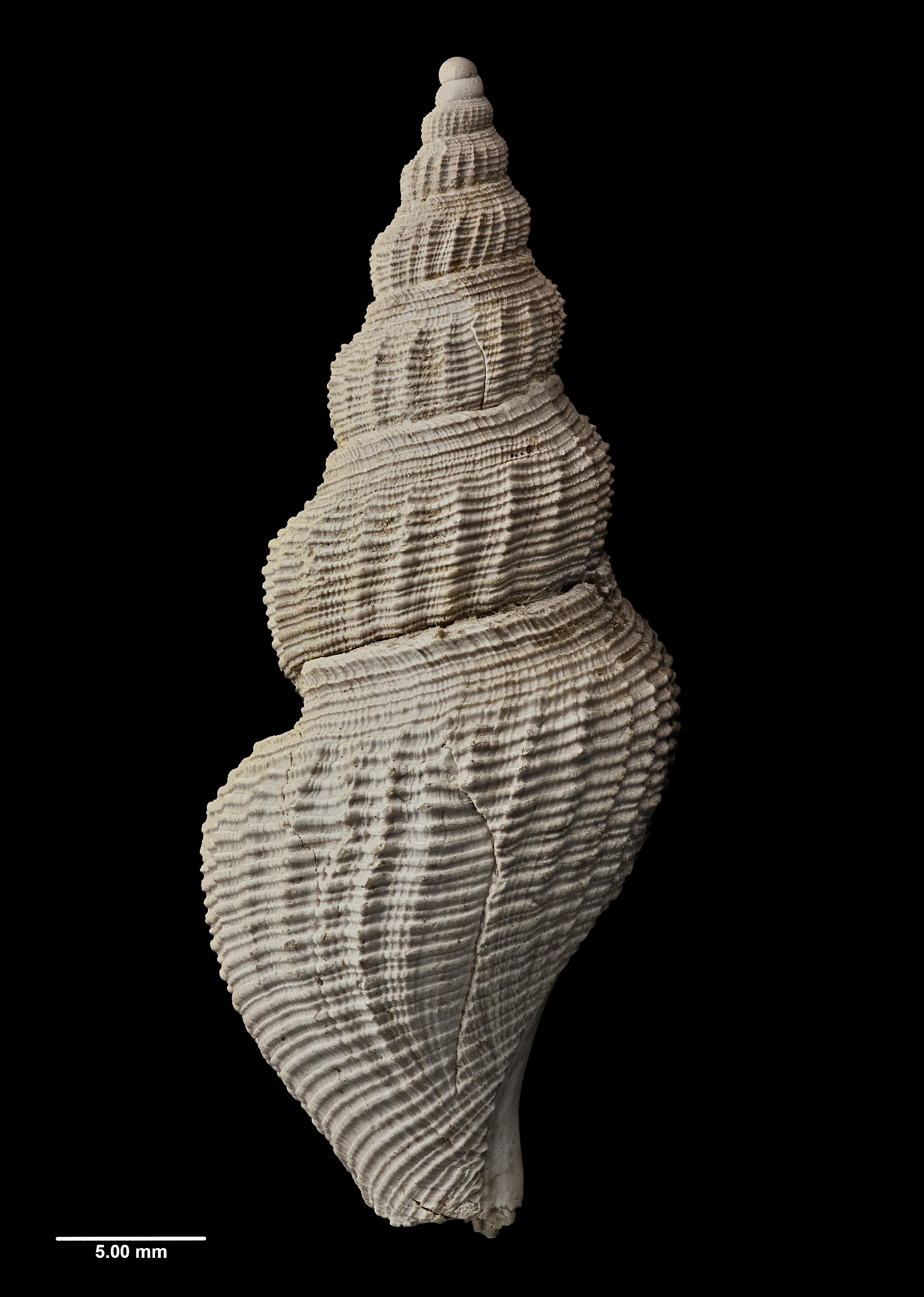
Reverse view of holotype
