= Austrotoma excavata =

Scientific classification
- Kingdom: Animalia
- Phylum: Mollusca
- Class: Gastropoda
- Subclass: Caenogastropoda
- Order: Neogastropoda
- Family: Pseudomelatomidae
- Genus: Austrotoma
- Species: †A. excavata

Binomial name
- †Austrotoma excavata (Suter, 1917)

Synonyms
- † Bathytoma excavata Suter, 1917 (superseded combination); † Bathytoma sulcata excavata Suter, 1917 superseded rank; † Pleurotoma sulcata excavata (Suter, 1917) superseded rank

Species of gastropod

Austrotoma excavata is an extinct species of sea snail, a marine gastropod mollusk in the family Pseudotomidae.

== Description ==
The shell features a subsutural fold that ranges from weak to moderate in prominence. Its spiral sculpture is restricted entirely to the base, while axial ribs appear only on the early whorls of the spire. The shoulder angle is sharply defined, characterized by a broad, smooth keel.

== Distribution ==
Fossils have been found in Middle Miocene strata at Kaipara, New Zealand.
