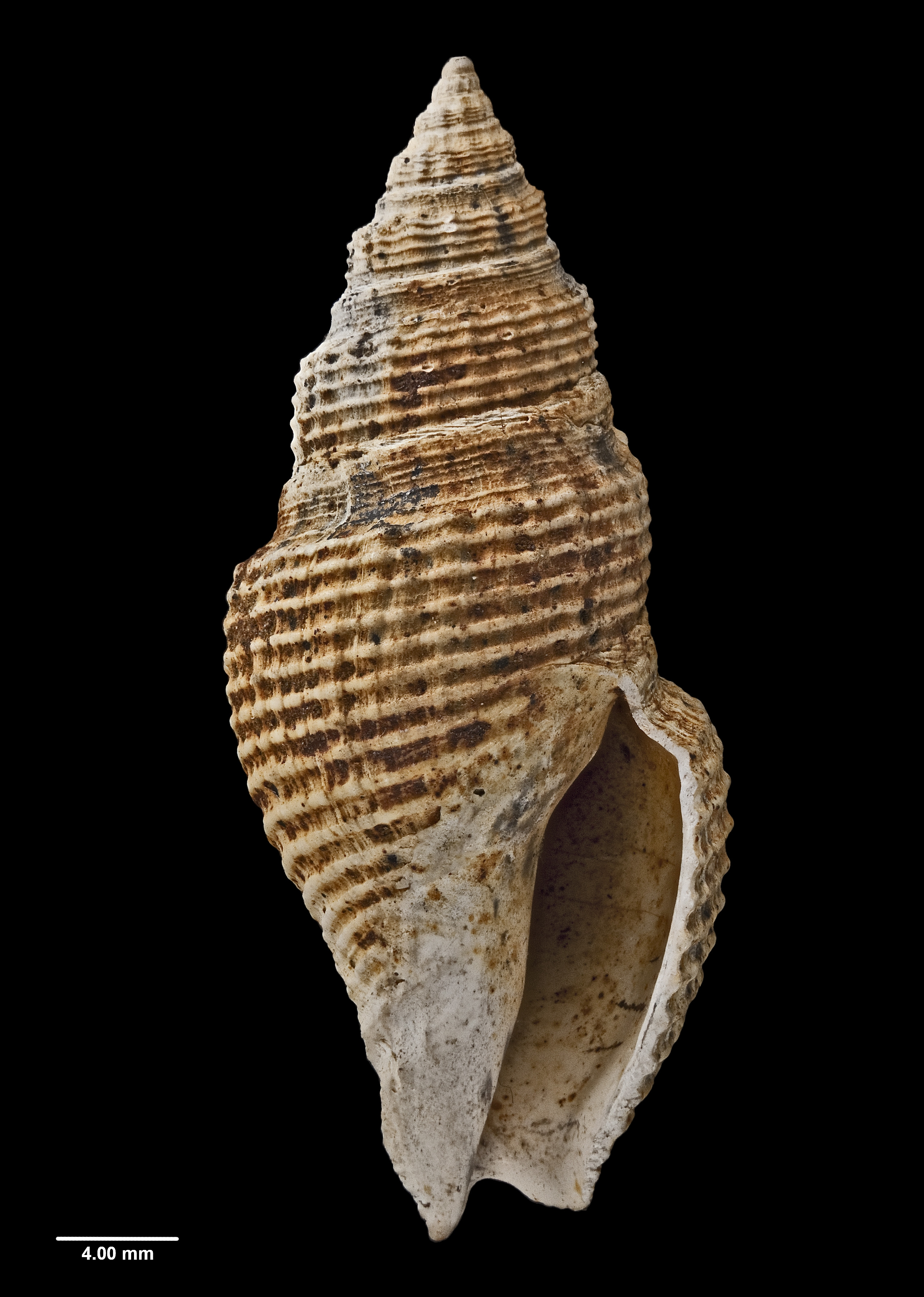
- Shell of Austrotoma minor (holotype at the Auckland War Memorial Museum)

Scientific classification
- Kingdom: Animalia
- Phylum: Mollusca
- Class: Gastropoda
- Subclass: Caenogastropoda
- Order: Neogastropoda
- Family: Pseudomelatomidae
- Genus: Austrotoma
- Species: †A. minor

Binomial name
- †Austrotoma minor (H. J. Finlay, 1924)

Synonyms
- † Austrotoma scopalveus H. J. Finlay, 1926 (junior subjective synonym); † Bela robusta F. W. Hutton, 1877 (invalid: not Packard, 1866); † Belophos (Austrotoma) minor H. J. Finlay, 1924 superseded combination; † Belophos minor H. J. Finlay, 1924 superseded combination

= Austrotoma minor =

Species of gastropod

Austrotoma minor is an extinct species of sea snail, a marine gastropod mollusk in the family Pseudotomidae.

== Description ==
The shell reaches a length of 41 mm and a diameter of 18 mm.

(Described as Austrotoma scopalveus) The shell is moderately large and distinguished by a strong cancellate ornament, a deep basal notch, and a keeled fasciole. Although the protoconch is rubbed, it likely shares the characteristics described for Austrotoma excavata. Each whorl features approximately 24 broadish, slightly forward-sloping axial riblets that originate at the shoulder and reach the lower suture; however, these riblets become more or less obsolete on the body whorl and are frequently worn away on the penultimate and antepenultimate whorls as well.

The shoulder is decorated with a few distant, fine spiral threads and curved sinus growth lines. The remainder of the shell is covered in strong, raised spiral cords—with five appearing on the spire whorls and fifteen on the body whorl. These cords are slightly undulated by the axial ribs, and their interstices, which are twice the width of the cords themselves, frequently contain one or two smaller interstitial riblets.

The spire is higher than the aperture, and its outlines are faintly convex. The whorls are shouldered above the middle, appearing strongly concave above the shoulder and straight below it. Because the whorls are clasping, the suture remains inconspicuous; it is margined by a spiral cord above and by very oblique, rough growth lines below, with a slight ridge situated between these lines and the concave shoulder.

The aperture takes an elongate-pyriform shape, angling at the top and gradually tapering toward the base into a widely open, rather long siphonal canal that ends in a deep, triangular basal notch. The outer lip is thin and sharp, featuring a Genotiform sinus on the shoulder that curves forward as it descends. The inner lip is indistinct, spreading as a thin gloss over the parietal wall and the columella. This columella is slightly oblique and thick, bulging slightly in the middle before slowly tapering to a point that reaches below the outer lip. Finally, the fasciole is sunken and lamellose, bounded anteriorly by a low, blunt angulation and posteriorly by a sharp, strong, cord-like keel that continues from the side of the notch.

== Distribution ==
Fossils have been found in Middle Miocene strata at Oamaru, New Zealand.
