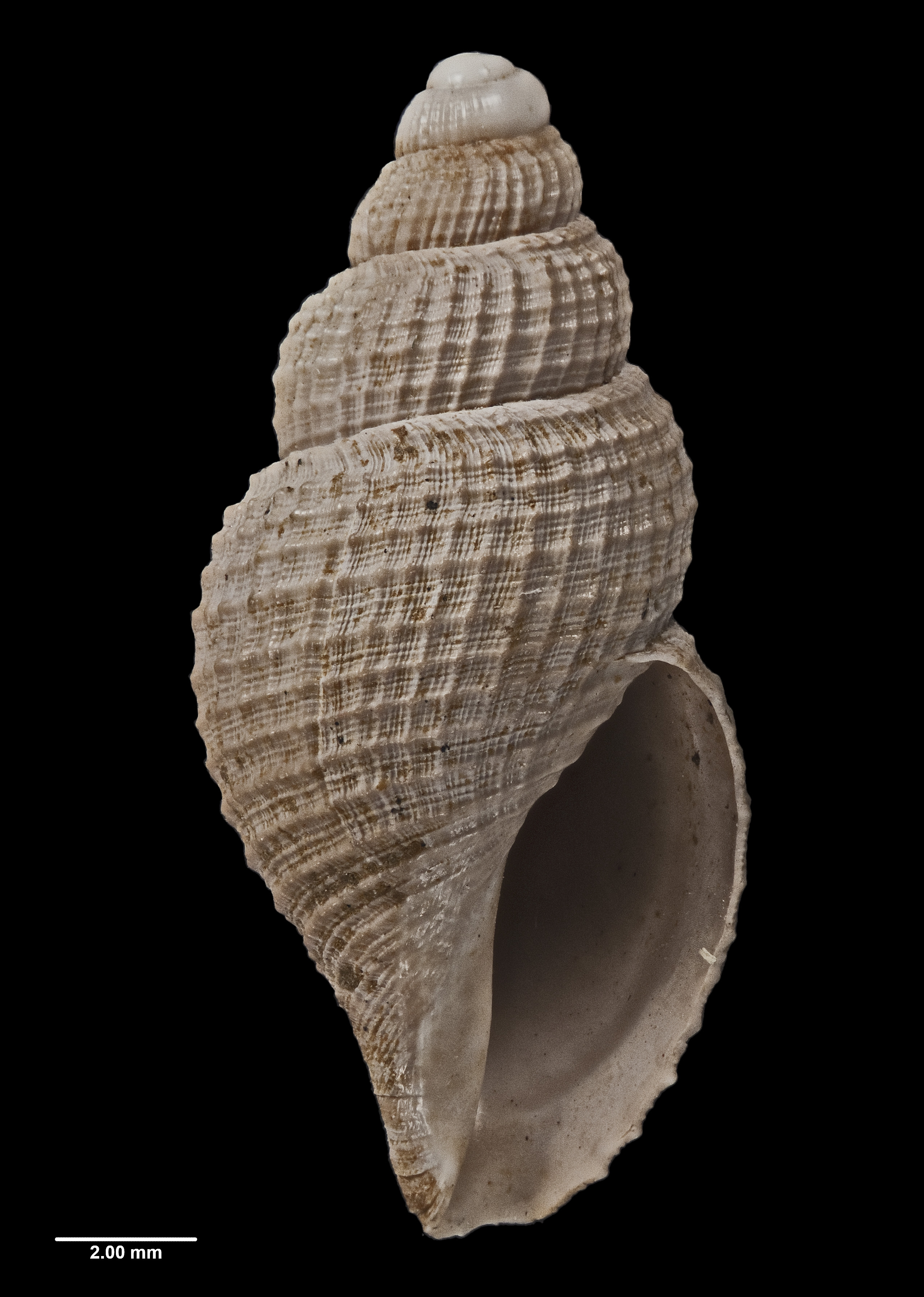
- Belatomina clathrata

Scientific classification
- Kingdom: Animalia
- Phylum: Mollusca
- Class: Gastropoda
- Subclass: Caenogastropoda
- Order: Neogastropoda
- Family: Borsoniidae
- Genus: †Belatomina; A. W. B. Powell, 1942

Type species
- Bela pulchra Tate, 1888

= Belatomina =

Belatomina Temporal range: early Miocene–middle Miocene

Genus of gastropods

Belatomina is an extinct genus of marine gastropods of the family Borsoniidae. Fossils of the genus have been found in southeastern Australia, and date to between the early and middle Miocene.

== Description ==
Members of Belatomina have weakly notches anterior canals, and no ridge-margining seen on the fasciole. They have biconic-ovate shells that are sized between 20–28 mm (0.79–1.10 in), moderately tall spires and an elongate-ovate body-whorl which gradually tapers to a short anterior canal, which is very weakly notched. Liratomina and Belatomina can be differentiated due to differences in teleoconches and the presence of a paucispiral protoconch in Liratomina.

== Taxonomy ==
The genus was first described in 1942 by A. W. B. Powell, due to Powell noting significant differences in Bela pulchra (now Belatomina pulchra) from other members of the genus Bela. In 2024, Thomas A. Darragh synonymised B. clathrata with B. pulchra, a change not currently accepted by the World Register of Marine Species.

== Distribution ==
Fossils of the genus are known to occur in Australia, with B. tenuisculpta dating to the early Miocene and being found in the Port Phillip Basin and Bass Basin, and B. pulchra dating to the middle Miocene and being found in the Otway Basin and Port Phillip Basin.

== Species ==
Species within the genus Belatomina include:

- †Belatomina clathrata A. W. B. Powell, 1944
- †Belatomina pulchra (Tate, 1888)
- †Belatomina tenuisculpta (Tenison Woods, 1877)
