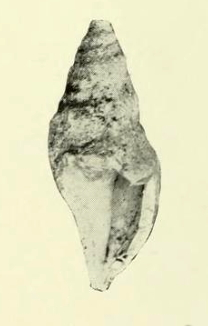
- Shell of Austrotoma suteri (holotype)

Scientific classification
- Kingdom: Animalia
- Phylum: Mollusca
- Class: Gastropoda
- Subclass: Caenogastropoda
- Order: Neogastropoda
- Family: Pseudomelatomidae
- Genus: Austrotoma
- Species: †A. suteri

Binomial name
- †Austrotoma suteri (Cossmann, 1916)

Synonyms
- † Bathytoma sulcata (F. W. Hutton, 1873) † · unaccepted (invalid: homonym); † Bathytoma suteri Cossmann, 1916 (superseded combination); † Pleurotoma sulcata F. W. Hutton, 1873 (invalid: not Lamarck, 1804); † Pseudotoma huttoni H. J. Finlay, 1924 (junior objective synonym)

= Austrotoma suteri =

Species of gastropod

Austrotoma suteri is an extinct species of sea snail, a marine gastropod mollusk in the family Pseudotomidae.

== Distribution ==
Fossils have been found in Middle Miocene strata at Kaipara, New Zealand.
