= Austrotoma neozelanica =

Scientific classification
- Kingdom: Animalia
- Phylum: Mollusca
- Class: Gastropoda
- Subclass: Caenogastropoda
- Order: Neogastropoda
- Family: Pseudomelatomidae
- Genus: Austrotoma
- Species: †A. neozelanica

Binomial name
- †Austrotoma neozelanica (Suter, 1913)

Synonyms
- † Clavatula (Perrona) neozelanica Suter, 1913 (superseded combination); † Clavatula neozelanica Suter, 1913 (superseded combination)

Extinct species of gastropod

Austrotoma neozelanica is an extinct species of sea snail, a marine gastropod mollusc, in the family Pseudomelatomidae.

== Distribution ==
This extinct marine species occurs in the Upper Miocene strata near North Canterbury, New Zealand.
