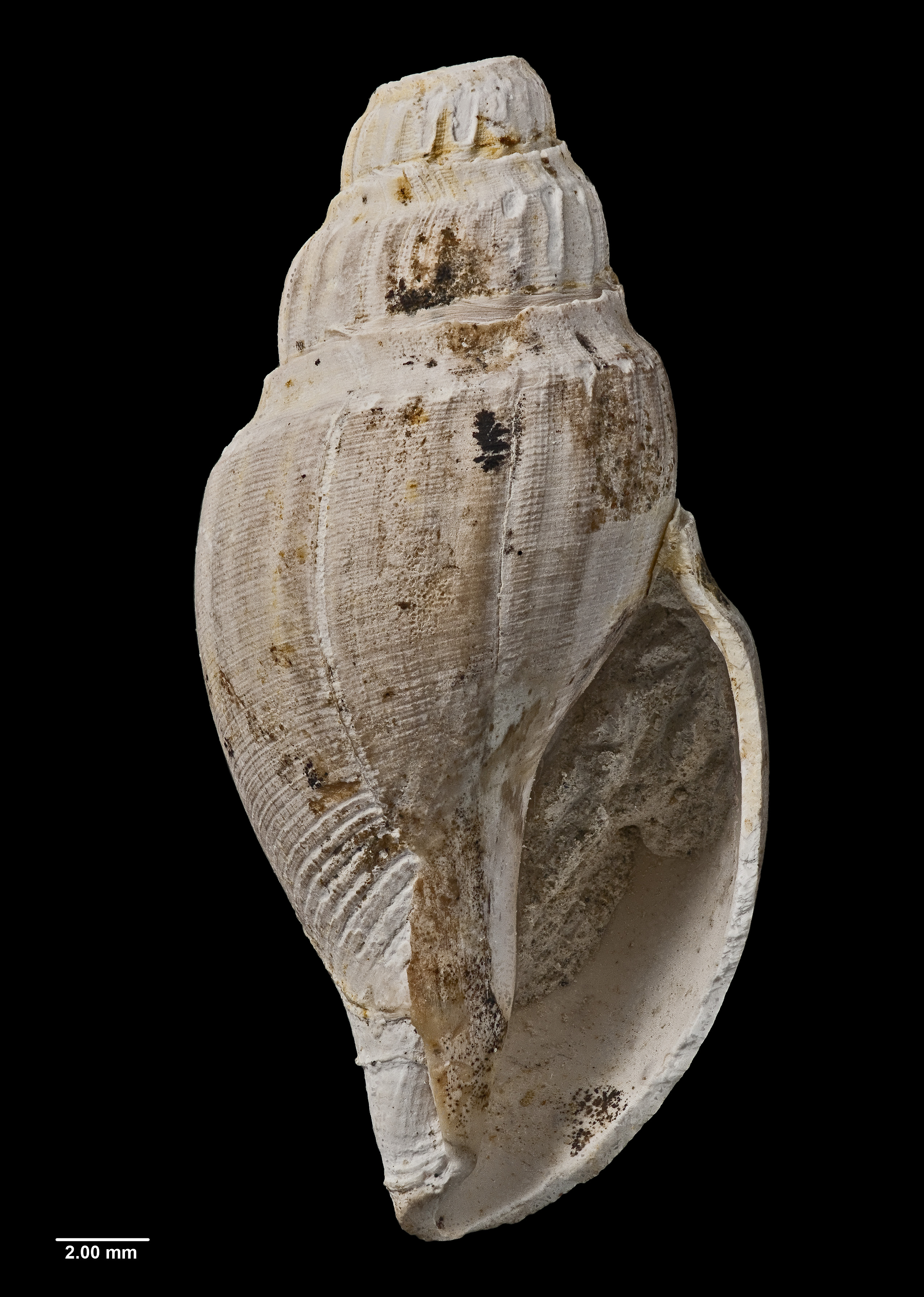
- Zeatoma anomala

Scientific classification
- Kingdom: Animalia
- Phylum: Mollusca
- Class: Gastropoda
- Subclass: Caenogastropoda
- Order: Neogastropoda
- Family: †Pseudotomidae
- Genus: †Zeatoma; P. A. Maxwell, 1992

Type species
- † Marshallena impar A. W. B. Powell, 1942

= Zeatoma =

Zeatoma Temporal range: 39.1–3.70 Ma

Genus of gastropods

Zeatoma is a genus of extinct sea snails, marine gastropod molluscs in the family Pseudotomidae. Species in the genus begin to appear in fossil record in the Kaiatan stage of the Eocene, and are only known to occur in New Zealand, living in warm water environments. Falling temperatures during the Pliocene has been suggested as a reason for the extinction of Zeatoma.

== Description ==
Members of the genus have fine, closely spaced spiral threads that are located between the primary spiral cords, which are not bisected by axial sculpture.

== Taxonomy ==
Zeatoma was first described in 1992 by Phillip A. Maxwell.

== Ecology ==
Members of Zeatoma preferred to live in warm waters. The genus likely became extinct due to falling seawater temperatures during the Pliocene.

== Distribution ==
All known fossil species have been found in New Zealand, and date to between the Kaiatan stage of the Eocene (39.1 million years ago) to the Waipipian stage of the Pliocene (3.70 million years ago).

== Species ==
Species within the genus Zeatoma include:

- † Zeatoma allani P. A. Maxwell, 1992
- † Zeatoma anomala (A. W. B. Powell, 1942)
- † Zeatoma austrotomoides (A. W. B. Powell, 1931)
- † Zeatoma celsa (Marwick, 1931)
- † Zeatoma decens (Marwick, 1931)
- † Zeatoma impar (A. W. B. Powell, 1942)
