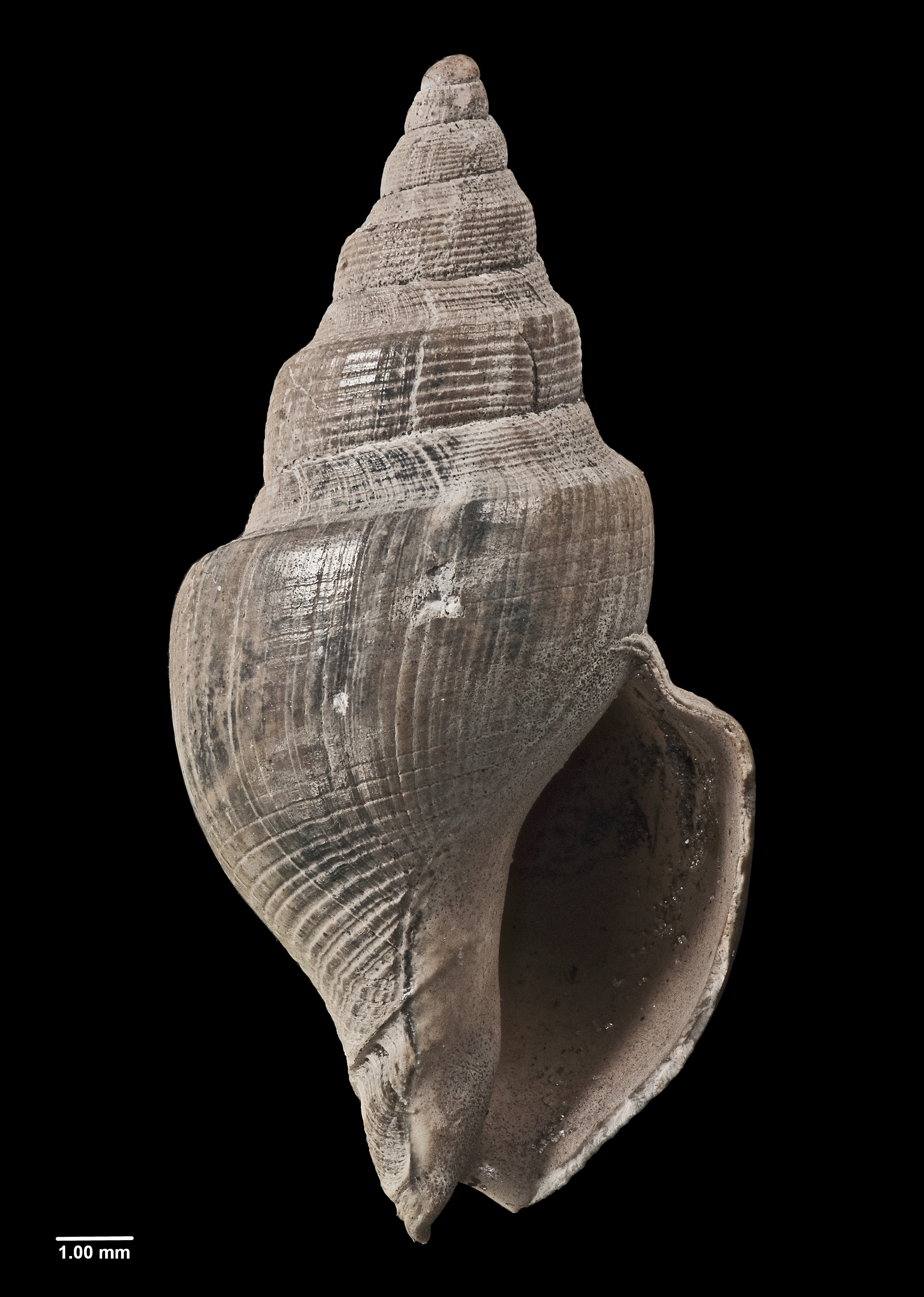
- Holotype from Auckland War Memorial Museum

Scientific classification
- Kingdom: Animalia
- Phylum: Mollusca
- Class: Gastropoda
- Subclass: Caenogastropoda
- Order: Neogastropoda
- Genus: †Liratomina
- Species: †L. adelaidensis

Binomial name
- †Liratomina adelaidensis A. W. B. Powell, 1944

= Liratomina adelaidensis =

Liratomina adelaidensis Temporal range: middle Miocene–late Pliocene

Extinct species of gastropod

Liratomina adelaidensis is an extinct species of sea snail, a marine gastropod mollusc, in the superfamily Conoidea, currently unassigned to a family. Fossils of the species date to the middle Miocene and late Pliocene, and are found in the strata of the Eucla Basin (Western Australia and South Australia), and the St Vincent Basin of South Australia.

== Description ==
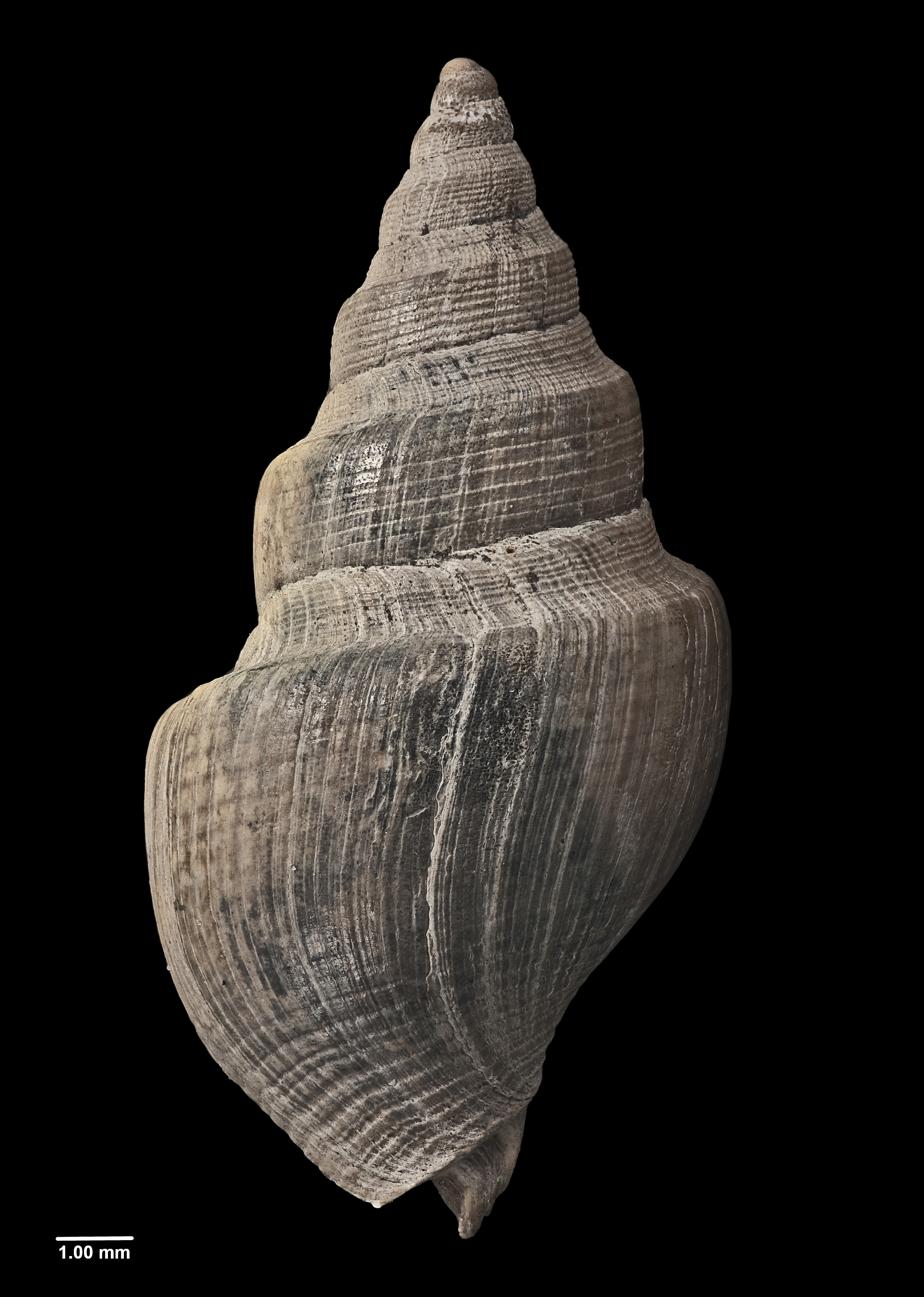
Reverse view of holotype

In the original description, Powell described the species as follows:

Moderately large, fusiform, prominently shouldered, with broad but deeply excavated shoulder; whorls 6 1/2, including typical protoconch of 1 1/2 whorls. Aperture half height of shell. Whorls polished, but with distinct slightly raised spiral sculpture. Axials obsolete except for fine growth lines, Shoulder, or posterior sinus area, concave, with seven to nine spiral threads and some intermediates. Seven or eight broad, flattened spiral cords with weakly incised linear grooves between them, extending from the shoulder angle to the lower suture. Spirals subobsolete on the body-whorl, but becoming stronger and wider spaced on the lower part of the base. Fasciole with three strong, medially placed spiral cords, separated from the base by a prominent narrow ridge. Anterior canal deeply notched.

The holotype measured 32.6 mm (1.28 in) in height and 16 mm (0.63 in) in diameter. Powell noted similarities in appearance between the species and members of Austrotoma at a superficial level.

== Taxonomy ==
The species was first described by A. W. B. Powell in 1944. The holotype was collected by W. Howchin and J.C. Verco in 1919 from the Metropolitan Abattoirs Bore in Adelaide, South Australia, at a depth of 122–152 m (400–499 ft). It is held by the Auckland War Memorial Museum.

== Distribution ==
This extinct marine species occurs in middle Miocene and late Pliocene strata of the Eucla Basin of Western Australia and South Australia, and the St Vincent Basin of South Australia, including the Roe Calcarenite and the Dry Creek Sands.
