= Austrotoma indiscreta =

Scientific classification
- Kingdom: Animalia
- Phylum: Mollusca
- Class: Gastropoda
- Subclass: Caenogastropoda
- Order: Neogastropoda
- Family: Pseudomelatomidae
- Genus: Austrotoma
- Species: †A. indiscreta

Binomial name
- †Austrotoma indiscreta H. J. Finlay & Marwick, 1937

Extinct species of gastropod

Austrotoma indiscreta is an extinct species of sea snail, a marine gastropod mollusc, in the family Pseudomelatomidae.

== Distribution ==
This extinct marine species occurs in the Upper Cretaceous strata near Dunedin, New Zealand.
