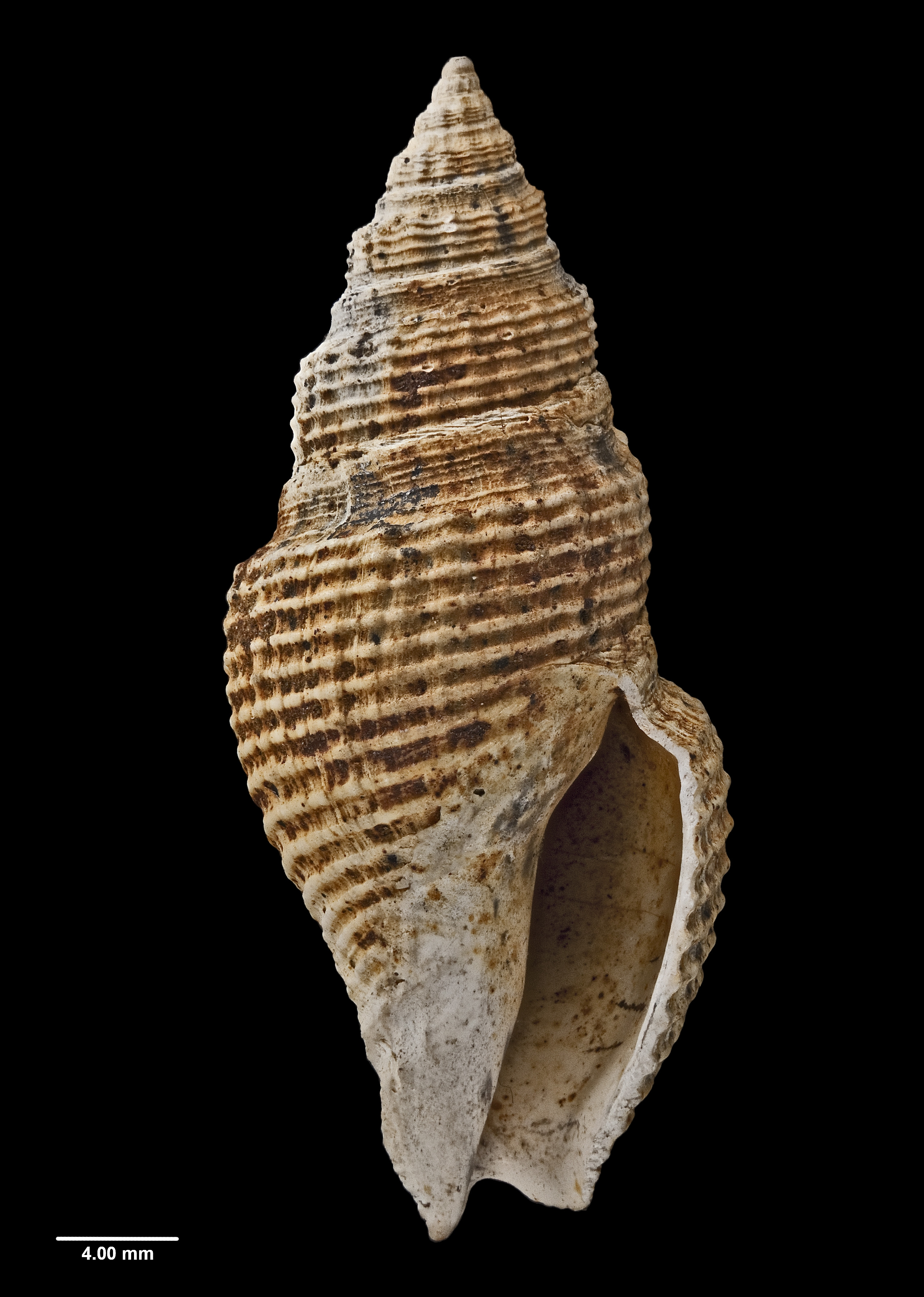
- Austrotoma minor

Scientific classification
- Kingdom: Animalia
- Phylum: Mollusca
- Class: Gastropoda
- Subclass: Caenogastropoda
- Order: Neogastropoda
- Superfamily: Conoidea
- Family: Pseudomelatomidae
- Genus: Austrotoma; Finlay, 1924

Type species
- † Bathytoma excavata Suter, 1917

Synonyms
- Acamptogenotia (Austrotoma) H. J. Finlay, 1924 superseded rank; Belophos (Austrotoma) H. J. Finlay, 1924 superseded rank

= Austrotoma =

Genus of gastropods

Austrotoma is a genus of sea snails, marine gastropod mollusks, in the family Pseudomelatomidae. It has also been placed in the family Pseudotomidae.

== Distribution ==
Fossils have been found in Miocene strata in Argentina and New Zealand, Oligocene strata in New Zealand and Eocene strata in Antarctica.

== Species ==
Species within the genus Austrotoma include the following. All are extinct except Austrotoma aguayoi.

- Austrotoma aguayoi (Carcelles, 1953)
- †Austrotoma ampla A. W. B. Powell, 1942
- †Austrotoma antarctica Karczewski, 1985
- †Austrotoma clifdenica A. W. B. Powell, 1942
- †Austrotoma cryptoconoidea A. W. B. Powell, 1942
- †Austrotoma deducta Marwick, 1931
- †Austrotoma echinata A. W. B. Powell, 1942
- †Austrotoma echinulata (Hupé, 1854)
- †Austrotoma excavata (Suter, 1917)
- †Austrotoma eximia (Suter, 1917)
- †Austrotoma finlayi A. W. B. Powell, 1938
- †Austrotoma gemmulata A. W. B. Powell, 1942
- †Austrotoma gracilicostata (Zittel, 1865)
- †Austrotoma hurupiensis Dell, 1952
- †Austrotoma inaequabilis Marwick, 1929
- †Austrotoma indiscreta H. J. Finlay & Marwick, 1937
- †Austrotoma inexpectata A. W. B. Powell, 1944
- †Austrotoma intertexta (A. W. B. Powell, 1944)
- †Austrotoma janjukiensis A. W. B. Powell, 1944
- †Austrotoma kaiparaensis A. W. B. Powell, 1942
- †Austrotoma lawsi A. W. B. Powell, 1942
- †Austrotoma minor (H. J. Finlay, 1924)
- †Austrotoma molinei Marwick, 1931
- †Austrotoma neozelanica (Suter, 1913)
- †Austrotoma nervosa A. W. B. Powell, 1942
- †Austrotoma obsoleta H. J. Finlay, 1926
- †Austrotoma prolixa Laws, 1940
- †Austrotoma suteri (Cossmann, 1916)
- †Austrotoma toreuma Marwick, 1929
- †Austrotoma ventricosa Stilwell & Zinsmeister, 1992

Species brought into synonymy

- † Austrotoma adelaidensis (A. W. B. Powell, 1944): synonym of † Liratomina adelaidensis A. W. B. Powell, 1944 (superseded combination)
- † Austrotoma crassilirata (Tate, 1888): synonym of † Liratomina crassilirata (Tate, 1888) (superseded combination)
- † Austrotoma oliveroi Stilwell & Zinsmeister, 1992 : synonym of † Marshallaria oliveroi (Stilwell & Zinsmeister, 1992)
- † Austrotoma scopalveus Finlay, 1926: synonym of † Austrotoma minor (Finlay, 1924)
- † Austrotoma sculptilis (Tate, 1888): synonym of † Liratomina sculptilis (Tate, 1888) (superseded combination)
- † Austrotoma singularis (Ludbrook, 1978): synonym of † Epideira singularis (Ludbrook, 1978) (superseded combination)
