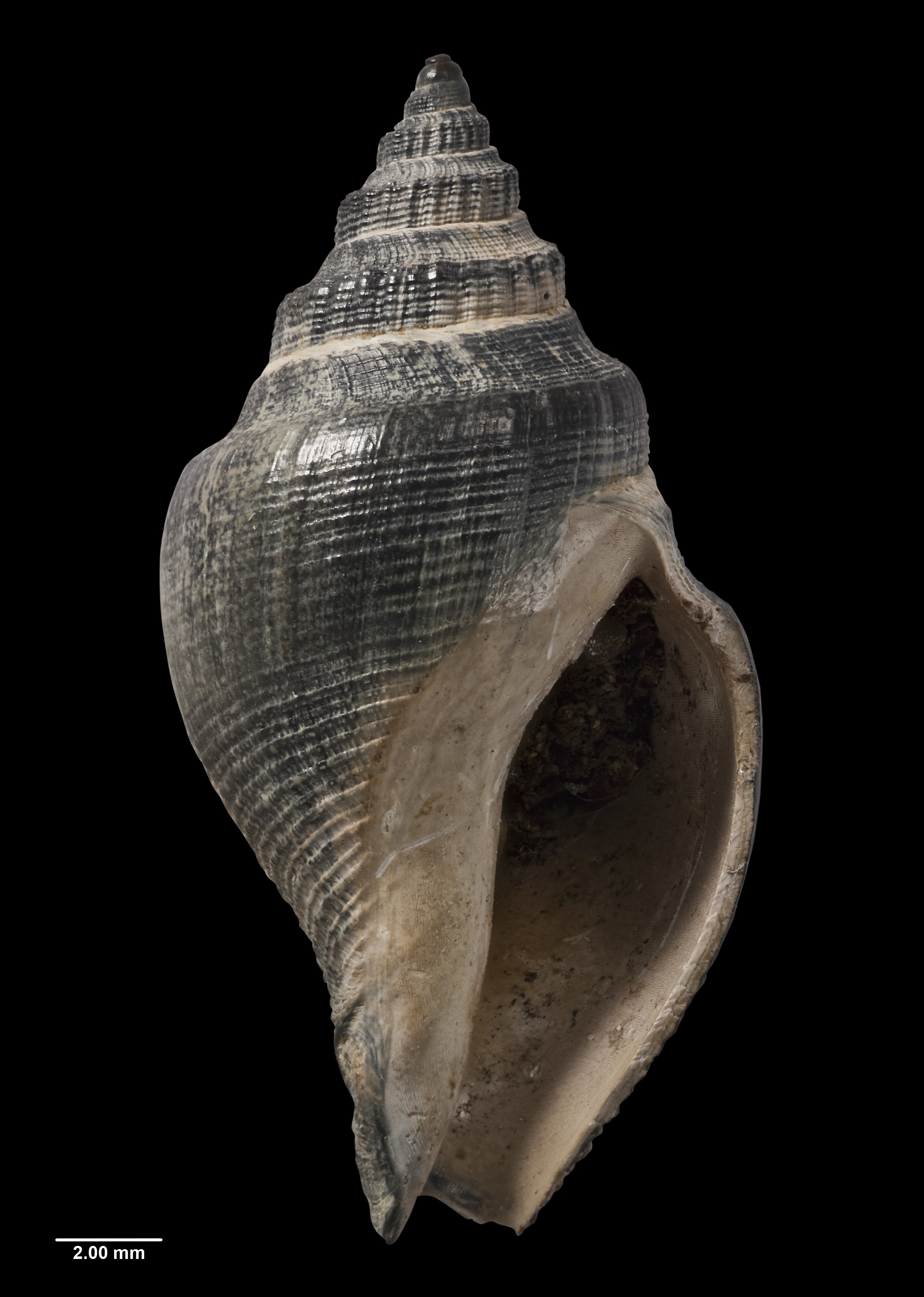
- Holotype from Auckland War Memorial Museum

Scientific classification
- Kingdom: Animalia
- Phylum: Mollusca
- Class: Gastropoda
- Subclass: Caenogastropoda
- Order: Neogastropoda
- Family: Pseudomelatomidae
- Genus: Austrotoma
- Species: †A. inexpectata

Binomial name
- †Austrotoma inexpectata A. W. B. Powell, 1944

Synonyms
- Austrotoma inexpecta A. W. B. Powell, 1944

= Austrotoma inexpectata =

Austrotoma inexpectata Temporal range: early Miocene

Extinct species of gastropod

Austrotoma inexpectata is an extinct species of sea snail, a marine gastropod mollusc, in the family Pseudomelatomidae. Fossils of the species date to the early Miocene strata of the Bass Basin of Tasmania, Australia.

== Description ==
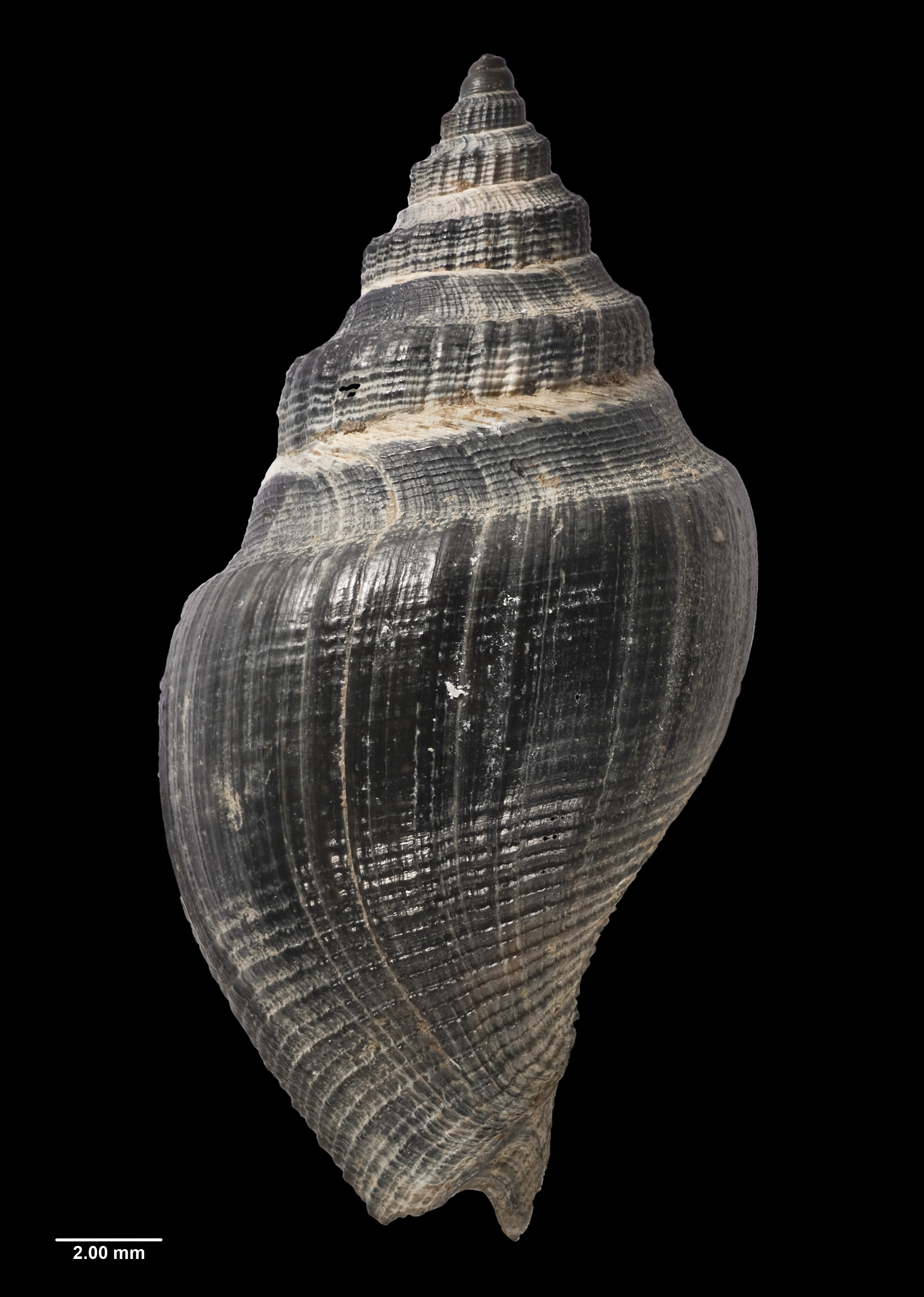
Reverse view of holotype

In the original description, Powell described the species as follows:

Shell ovate-biconic, with short spire, three-fourths height of aperture. Whorls rounded except for a moderately broad, shallowly excavated shoulder. The narrowly rounded shoulder angle is at the middle of the spire-whorls, but above the greatest peripheral convexity of the body-whorl. The surface is sculptured with closely spaced spiral threads and cords crossed on the early spire-whorls by numerous narrow!y rounded axial folds. There are no axials on the body-whorl apart from irregular growth lines. There is a narrow subsutural fold. Spire-whorls with 10 fine, spaced threads on the shoulder, 4 to 5 primary cords with intermediates from the shoulder angle to the lower suture and about 32 on the body-whorl from below the shoulder angle. The cords are weak over the upper half of the base, but quite strong below. The axial folds on the early whorls number from 26 to 28. The protoconch is quite typical, as described above. The anterior canal is very short and deeply notched. Fasciole margined by a sharp ridge.

The holotype of the species has a height of 22.5 mm (0.89 in), and a diameter of 11.5 mm (0.45 in), while a paratype also viewed by Powell had a height of 28.5 mm (1.12 in), and a diameter of 13 mm (0.51 in).

== Taxonomy ==
The species was first described by A. W. B. Powell in 1944. The holotype was collected prior to 1944 from Fossil Bluff, near Wynyard, Tasmania, Australia. It is held by the Auckland War Memorial Museum.

== Distribution ==
This extinct marine species occurs in early Miocene strata of the Bass Basin of Tasmania, Australia, including the Freestone Cove Sandstone.
