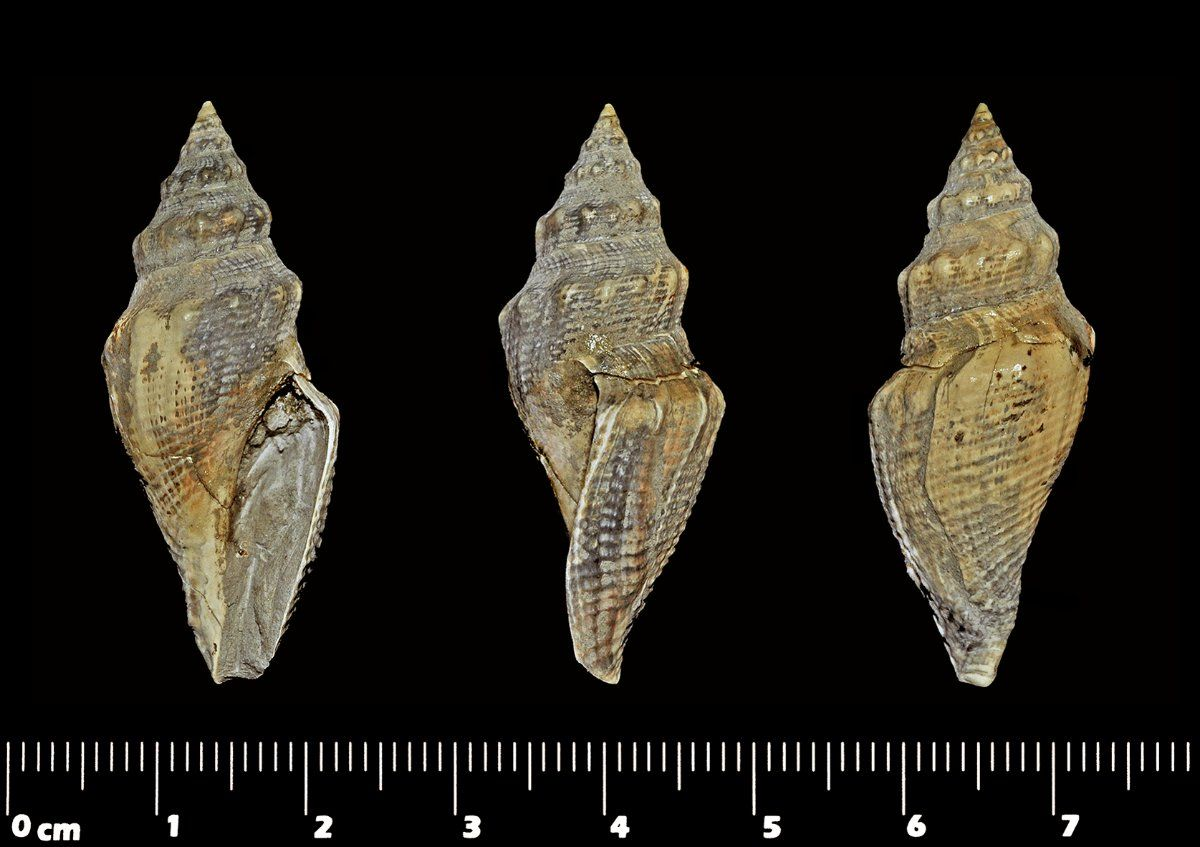
- Pseudotoma intorta

Scientific classification
- Kingdom: Animalia
- Phylum: Mollusca
- Class: Gastropoda
- Subclass: Caenogastropoda
- Order: Neogastropoda
- Superfamily: Conoidea
- Family: †Pseudotomidae; Bellardi, 1875

Type genus
- Pseudotoma Bellardi, 1875

Genera
- See text

Synonyms
- Pseudotominae Bellardi, 1875

= Pseudotomidae =

Pseudotomidae Temporal range: Paleocene–Pleistocene

Family of gastropods

Pseudotomidae is a taxonomic family of extinct minute sea snails, marine gastropod molluscs in the superfamily Conoidea.

== Taxonomy ==
Pseudotomidae was first described in 1875 by Luigi Bellardi as Pseudotominae, a subfamily of Pleurotomidae. Pseudotominae was later assigned to the family Turridae, and in 2011 synonymised with the family Borsoniidae. In the following year, A.G. Beu, Sascha Nolden and Thomas A. Darragh tentatively proposed Pseudotomidae as a family, awaiting molecular analysis.

The taxon was revived in 2025 by Ronald Janssen and Gerhard Stein and elevated to family status, based on arguments by A.G. Beu and P. A. Maxwell in 1990. Beu and Maxwell felt that Marshallaria, Pseudotoma, Notogenota and other genera in Pseudotominae represented the most primitive subfamily of Turridae.

== Ecology ==
Pseudotomidae fossils have typically been found in areas which were formerly deep waters.

== Distribution ==
Fossils in the family occur in strata from between the Paleocene and the Pleistocene, and have been found in Antarctica, Argentina, Australia, Denmark, France, Italy, Greenland, New Zealand, and the United States (Alabama, California, Florida, Louisiana, Maryland, Mississippi, Virginia and Washington).

== Genera ==
Genera within the family Pseudotomidae include:

- † Austrotoma H. J. Finlay, 1924
- † Marshallaria H. J. Finlay & Marwick, 1937
- † Notogenota A. W. B. Powell, 1942
- † Pseudotoma Bellardi, 1875
- † Tahuia P. A. Maxwell, 1992
- † Zeatoma P. A. Maxwell, 1992

Genera brought into synonymy

- Acamptogenotia Rovereto, 1899: synonym of Pseudotoma Bellardi, 1875
- Pseudotomina H. J. Finlay, 1924: synonym of Pseudotoma Bellardi, 1875

== Gallery ==
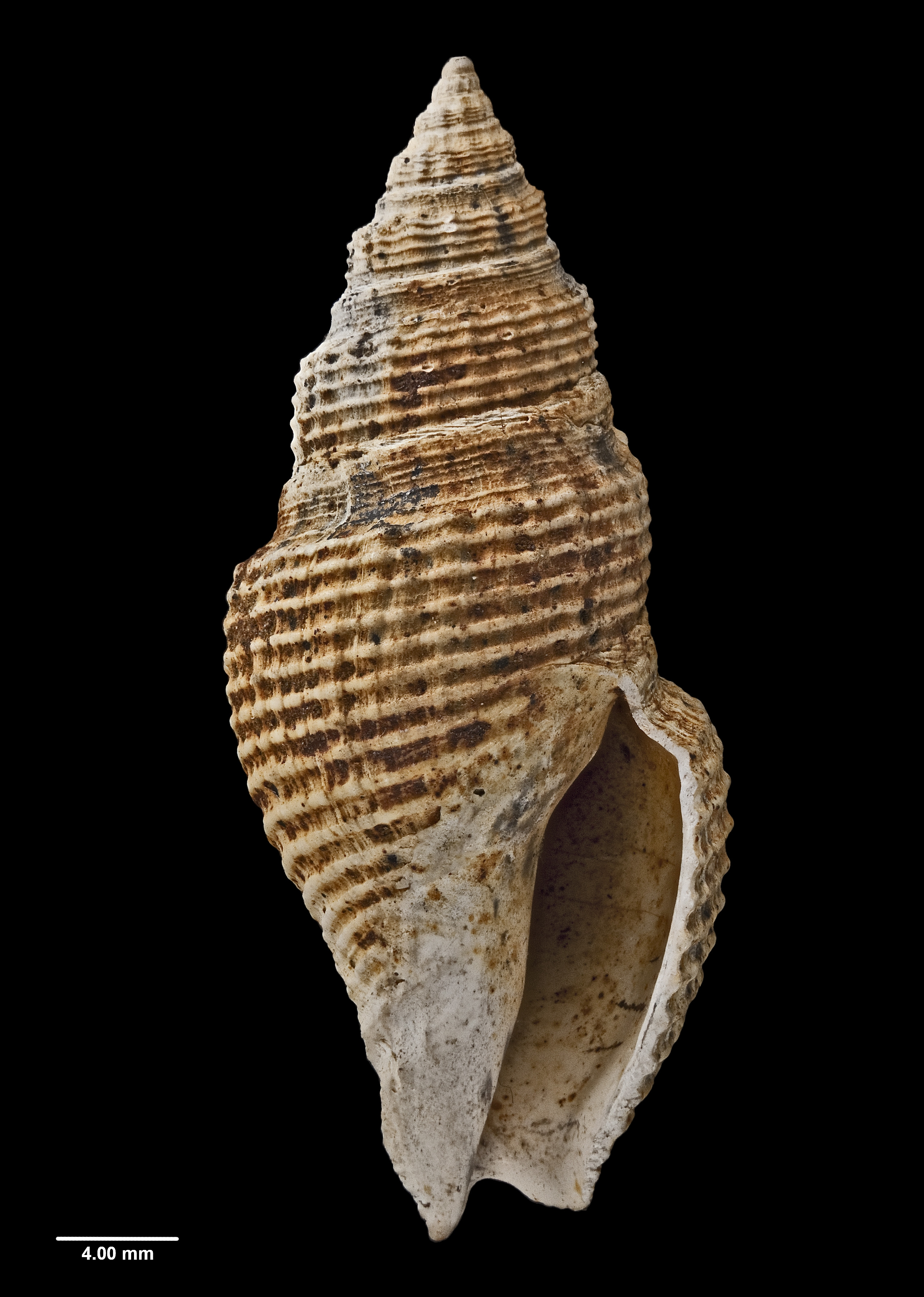
Austrotoma minor

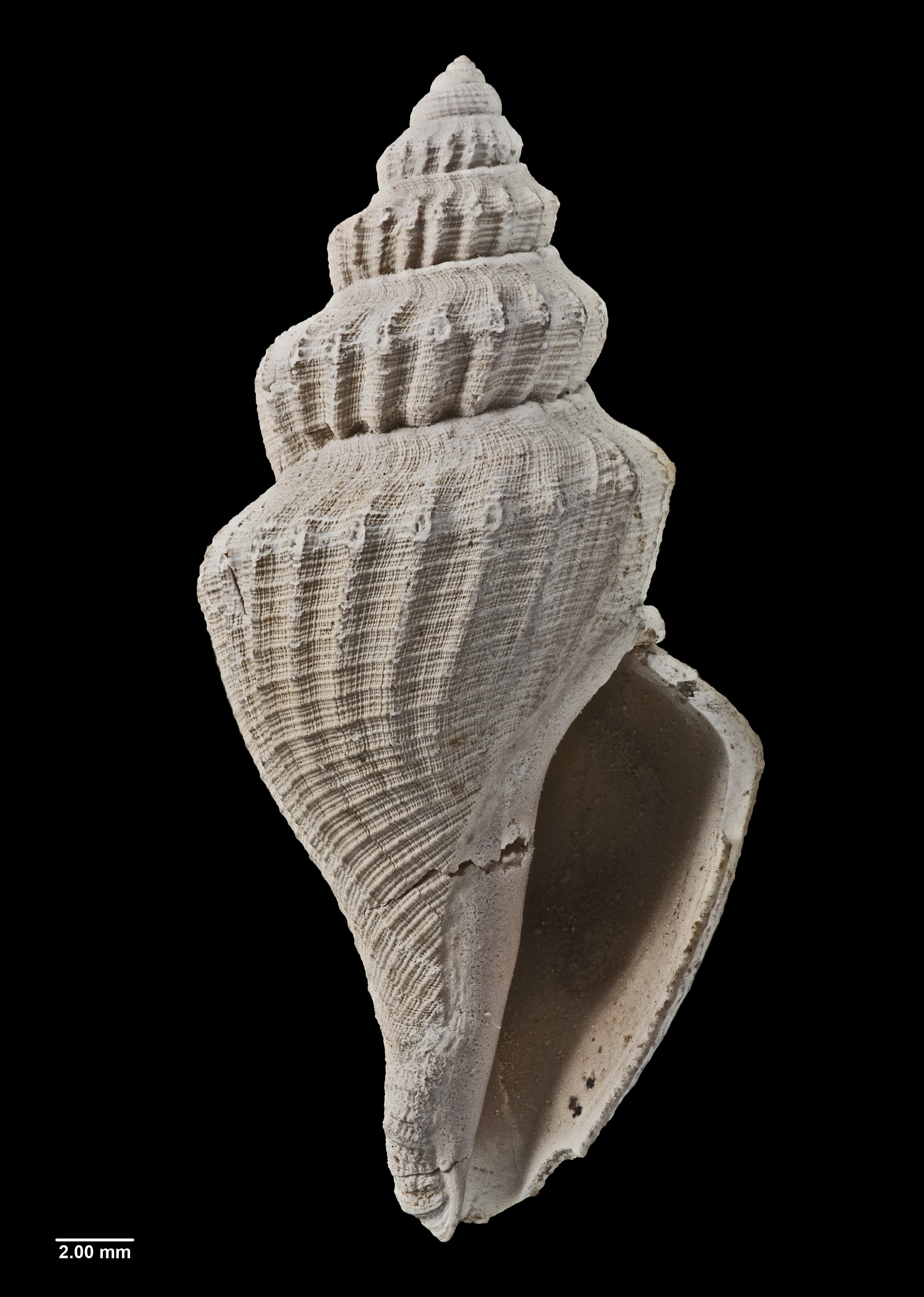
Marshallaria waitakiensis

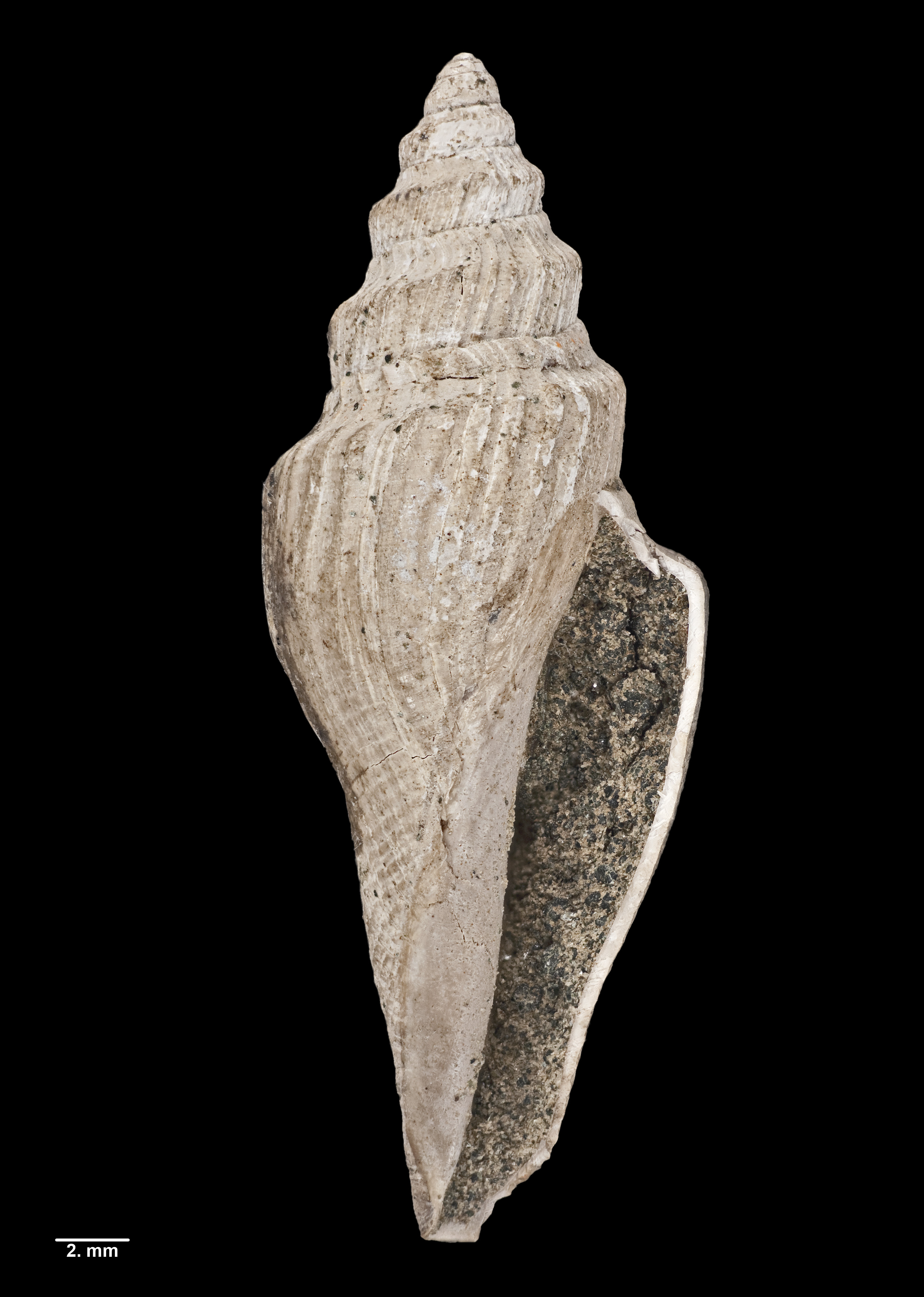
Notogenota finlayi

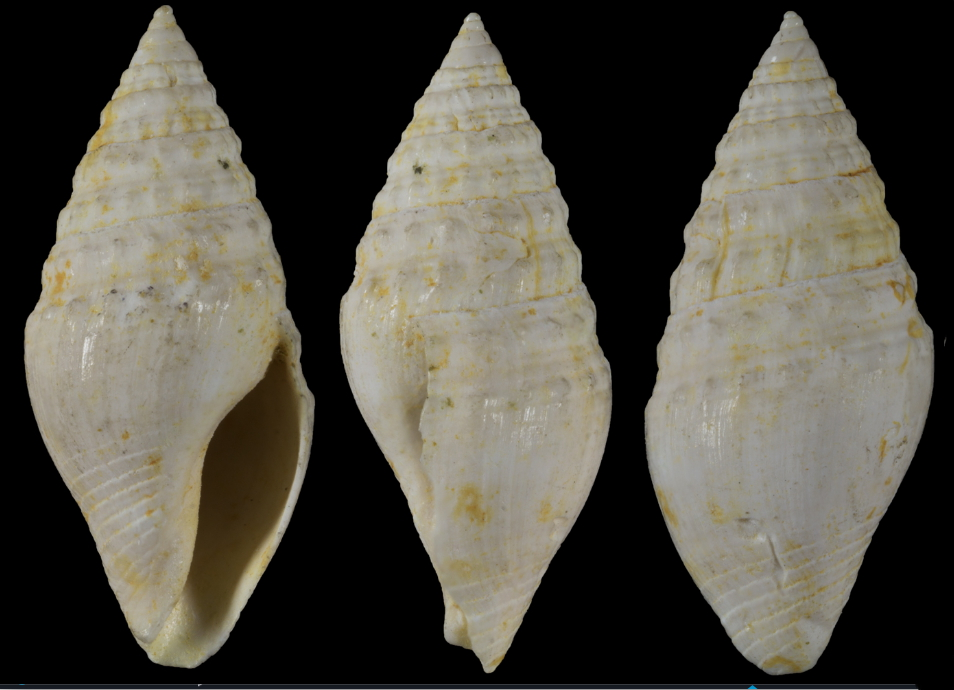
Pseudotoma coronata

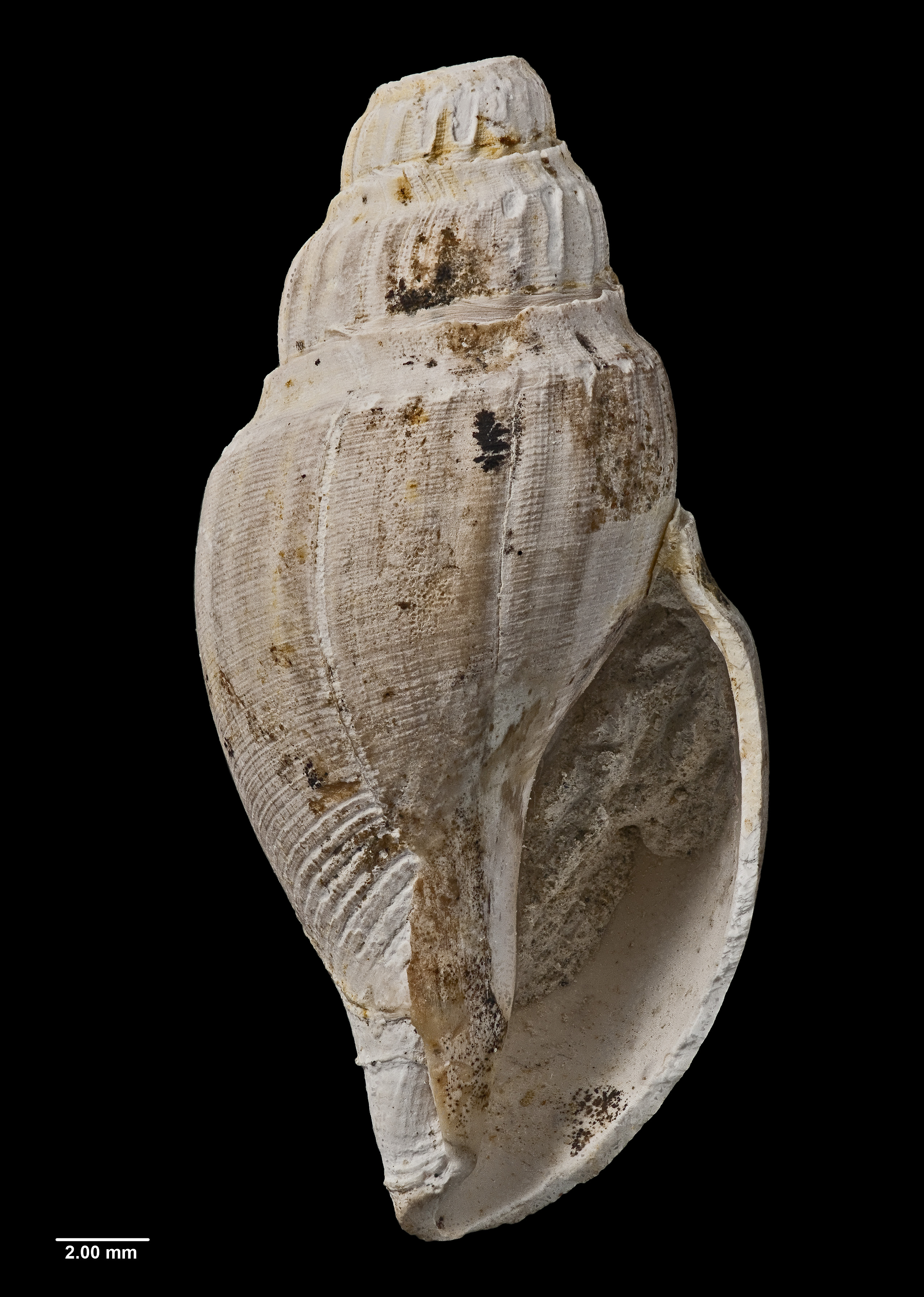
Zeatoma anomala
