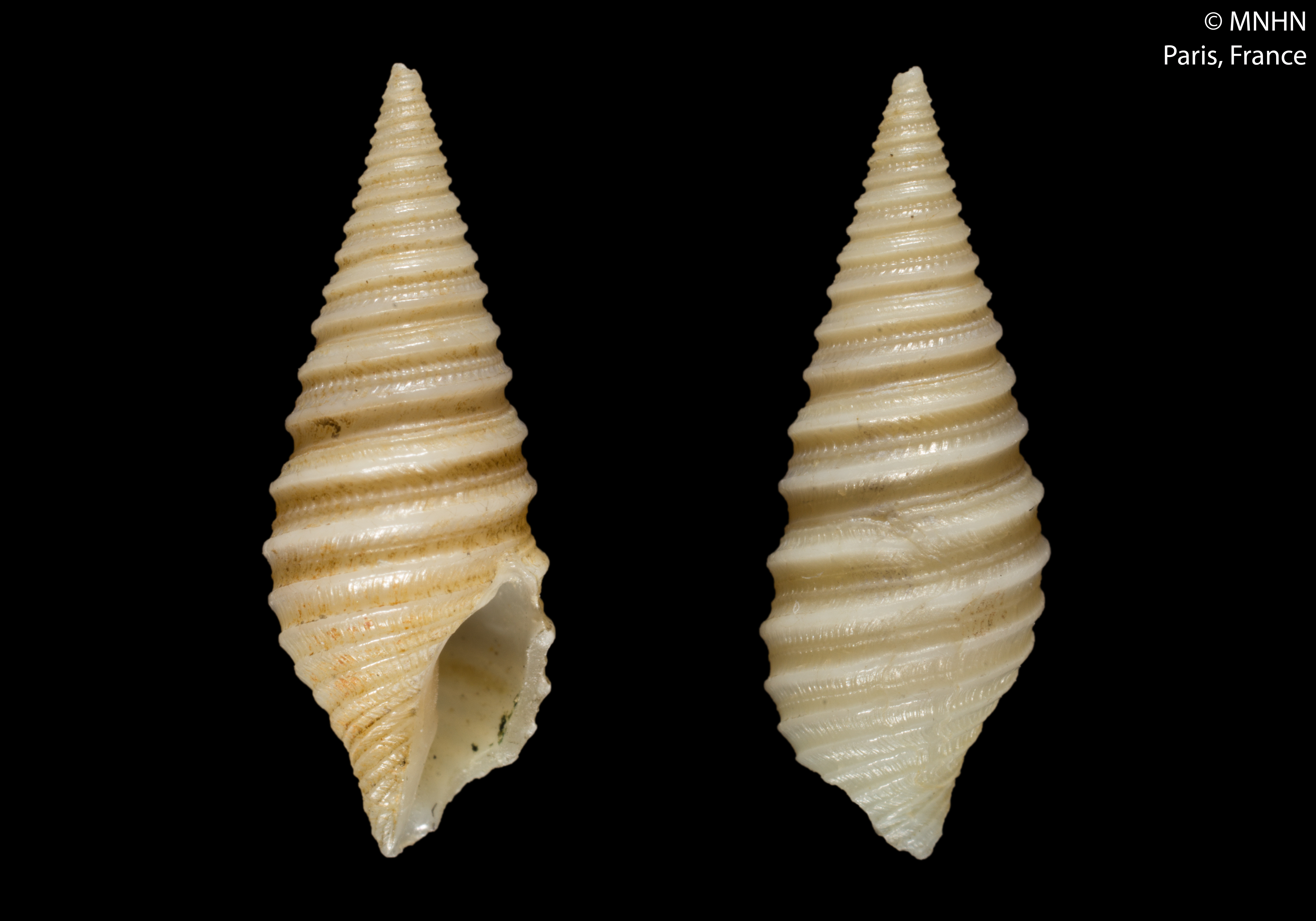
- A shell of Tomopleura bellardii

Scientific classification
- Kingdom: Animalia
- Phylum: Mollusca
- Class: Gastropoda
- Subclass: Caenogastropoda
- Order: Neogastropoda
- Superfamily: Conoidea
- Family: Borsoniidae
- Genus: Tomopleura; Casey, 1904

Type species
- Pleurotoma nivea, Philippi, 1851

= Tomopleura =

Genus of gastropods

Tomopleura is a genus of sea snails, marine gastropod mollusks in the family Borsoniidae.

== Description ==
The fusiform shell with a high spire and a truncate base is light-built with a deep, reverse "U-shaped" anal sinus on the shoulder slope and a tall, straight-sided conical spire. The apex is truncate. The sculpture of the shell shows strong spiral lirae and spiral keels with fine axial threads in the interstices. There is a spiral ridge at the lower columella. The radula is of the toxoglossan type.

== Distribution ==
Species in this marine genus occur in Central and East Indian Ocean, off East Africa, India (E), Indo-China, Japan, Mozambique, Philippines, the Red Sea, South Africa and Australia (Northern Territory, Queensland, Western Australia).

== Species ==
According to the World Register of Marine Species (WoRMS), the following species with valid names are included within the genus Tomopleura:

- Tomopleura bellardii (Jousseaume, 1883)
- Tomopleura carrota (Laseron, 1954)
- Tomopleura cicatrigula (Hedley, 1922)
- † Tomopleura clifdenica Powell, 1942
- Tomopleura coffea (Thiele, 1925)
- † Tomopleura crassispiralis (Marwick, 1929)
- Tomopleura dilecta (Hedley, 1903)
- † Tomopleura excavata (Hutton, 1877)
- † Tomopleura finlayi Powell, 1942
- † Tomopleura furcata Harzhauser, Raven & Landau, 2018
- Tomopleura fuscocincta Gofas & Rolán, 2009
- † Tomopleura ludbrookae Powell, 1944
- Tomopleura nivea (Philippi, 1851)
- Tomopleura oscitans Kilburn, 1986
- Tomopleura pouloensis Jousseaume, 1883
- Tomopleura reciproca (Gould, 1860)
- Tomopleura regina (Thiele, 1925)
- Tomopleura retusispirata (Smith E. A., 1877)
- Tomopleura spiralissima Gofas & Rolán, 2009 - synonyms = Asthenotoma spiralis (Smith, 1872), Pleurotoma spiralis, Smith, 1872
- † Tomopleura striata (P. Marshall, 1917)
- Tomopleura subtilinea (Hedley, 1918)
- Tomopleura thisbe (Melvill, 1906)
- Tomopleura thola (Laseron, 1954)
- Tomopleura tricincta Gofas & Rolán, 2009
- Tomopleura vertebrata (Smith E. A., 1875)
- † Tomopleura waiauensis Powell, 1942

Species brought into synonymy

- Tomopleura albula (Hutton, 1873): synonym of Maoritomella albula (Hutton, 1873)
- Tomopleura fultoni (G.B. Sowerby III, 1888): synonym of Pulsarella fultoni (G.B. Sowerby III, 1888)
- Tomopleura ischna (Watson, 1881): synonym of Maoritomella ischna (Watson, 1881)
- Tomopleura multiplex (Webster, 1906): synonym of Maoritomella multiplex (Webster, 1881)
- Tomopleura orientalis (Dell, 1956): synonym of Maoritomella orientalis Dell, 1956
- Tomopleura reevii (Adams C. B., 1950): synonym of Drilliola reevii (C. B. Adams, 1850)
- † Tomopleura transenna (Suter, 1917): synonym of † Cryptomella transenna (Suter, 1917)
