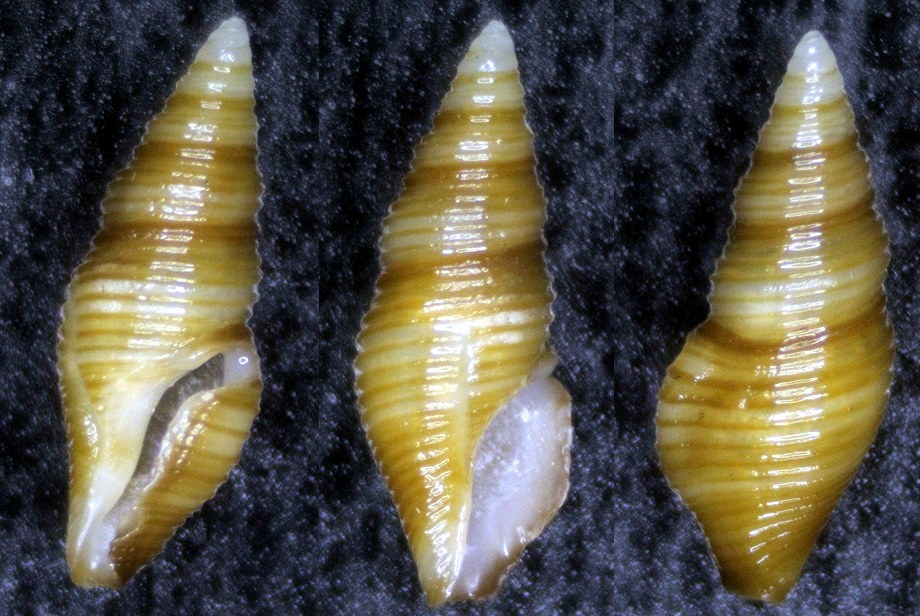
- Three views of a shell of Maoritomella batjanensis

Scientific classification
- Kingdom: Animalia
- Phylum: Mollusca
- Class: Gastropoda
- Subclass: Caenogastropoda
- Order: Neogastropoda
- Superfamily: Conoidea
- Family: Borsoniidae
- Genus: Maoritomella; Powell, 1942

Type species
- Pleurotoma albula Hutton, 1873

Synonyms
- Narraweena Laseron, 1954

= Maoritomella =

Genus of gastropods

Maoritomella is a genus of sea snails, marine gastropod mollusks in the family Borsoniidae.

== Description ==
Shells of Maoritomella are tall-spired and have a truncated body-whorl, with a paucispiral protoconch, a globular of two smooth whorls, that is followed by a half whorl of brephic axials. The small shell seldom exceeds 10 mm (0.39 in) and has usually a fusiform-biconical shape. The axial riblets in the bluntly domed protoconch are absent or restricted to the terminal half-whorl. The sculpture consists of strong spiral lirae or cords with fine collabral threads crossing spiral lirae. It often contains a peripheral keel but never a conspicuous shoulder angle. The siphonal canal is not or feebly indented. There is an anal sinus on the shoulder slope. An operculum is present. The marginal teeth of the radula are rather short, straight and awl-like

== Taxonomy ==
The genus was first described by A. W. B. Powell in 1942, due to the difficulty of placing Pleurotoma albula (now Maoritomella albula) in an appropriate genus.

== Distribution ==
This marine genus occurs off Indonesia, South Africa, Zanzibar,, New Caledonia, New Zealand and Australia (New South Wales, Queensland and South Australia).

== Species ==
Species within the genus Maoritomella include:

- Maoritomella albula (Hutton, 1873)
- † Maoritomella balcombensis A. W. B. Powell, 1944
- Maoritomella clupeispina Kilburn, 1986
- Maoritomella densecostulata Kilburn, 1986
- † Maoritomella equispiralis A. W. B. Powell, 1944
- Maoritomella eva (Thiele, 1925)
- Maoritomella foliacea Laseron, 1954
- Maoritomella granilirata Kilburn, 1986
- Maoritomella ischna (Watson, 1881)
- Maoritomella leptopleura Kilburn, 1986
- Maoritomella megalacme Kilburn, 1986
- † Maoritomella moderata (Marwick, 1965)
- Maoritomella multiplex (Webster, 1906)
- † Maoritomella nutans A. W. B. Powell, 1944
- Maoritomella orientalis Dell, 1956
- † Maoritomella pagodula Powell, 1942
- Maoritomella pleonastica (Barnard, 1958)
- † Maoritomella robusta Powell, 1942
- † Maoritomella studiosorum (L. C. King, 1933)
- † Maoritomella subalbula (R. Murdoch, 1900)
- Maoritomella tarrhion Kilburn, 1986
- † Maoritomella torquatella (Marwick, 1931)

Species brought into synonymy

- † Maoritomella annosa A. W. B. Powell, 1942: synonym of Drilliola annosa (A. W. B. Powell, 1942)
- Maoritomella batjanensis (Schepman, 1913): synonym of Otitoma batjanensis (Schepman, 1913)
- † Maoritomella pukeuriensis A. W. B. Powell, 1942: synonym of Drilliola pukeuriensis (A. W. B. Powell, 1942)
- † Maoritomella sola A. W. B. Powell, 1942: synonym of Drilliola sola (A. W. B. Powell, 1942)
- Maoritomella thola Laseron, 1954: synonym of Tomopleura thola (Laseron, 1954)
