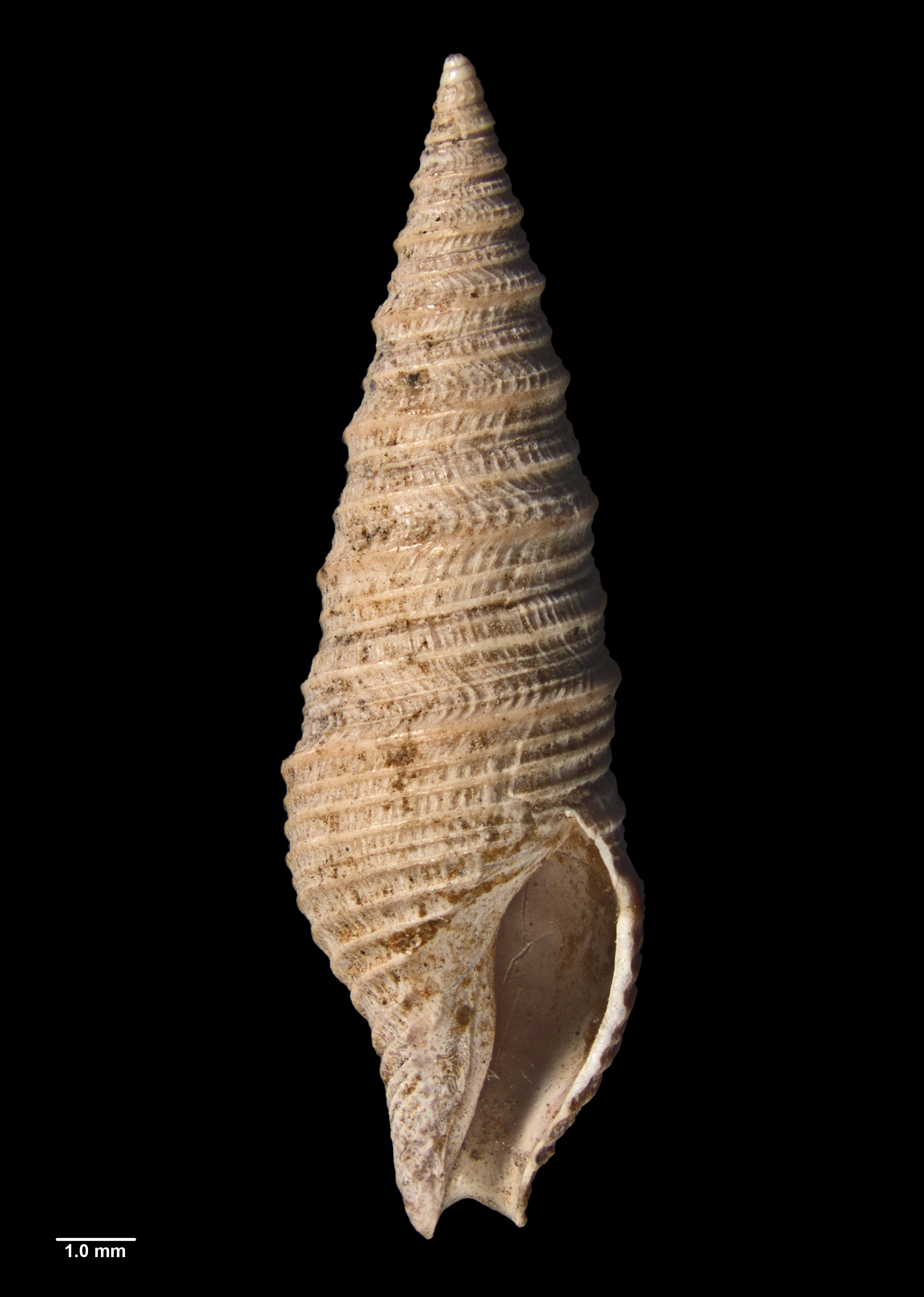
- Holotype from Auckland War Memorial Museum

Scientific classification
- Kingdom: Animalia
- Phylum: Mollusca
- Class: Gastropoda
- Subclass: Caenogastropoda
- Order: Neogastropoda
- Family: Borsoniidae
- Genus: Tomopleura
- Species: †T. ludbrookae

Binomial name
- †Tomopleura ludbrookae Powell, 1944

= Tomopleura ludbrookae =

Tomopleura ludbrookae Temporal range: Middle Miocene–Late Pliocene

Extinct species of gastropod

Tomopleura ludbrookae is an extinct species of sea snail, a marine gastropod mollusc in the family Raphitomidae. Fossils of the species date to the middle Miocene and potentially the Late Pliocene, and have been found in strata of the St Vincent Basin of South Australia, and potentially from the Eucla Basin of Western and South Australia.

== Description ==
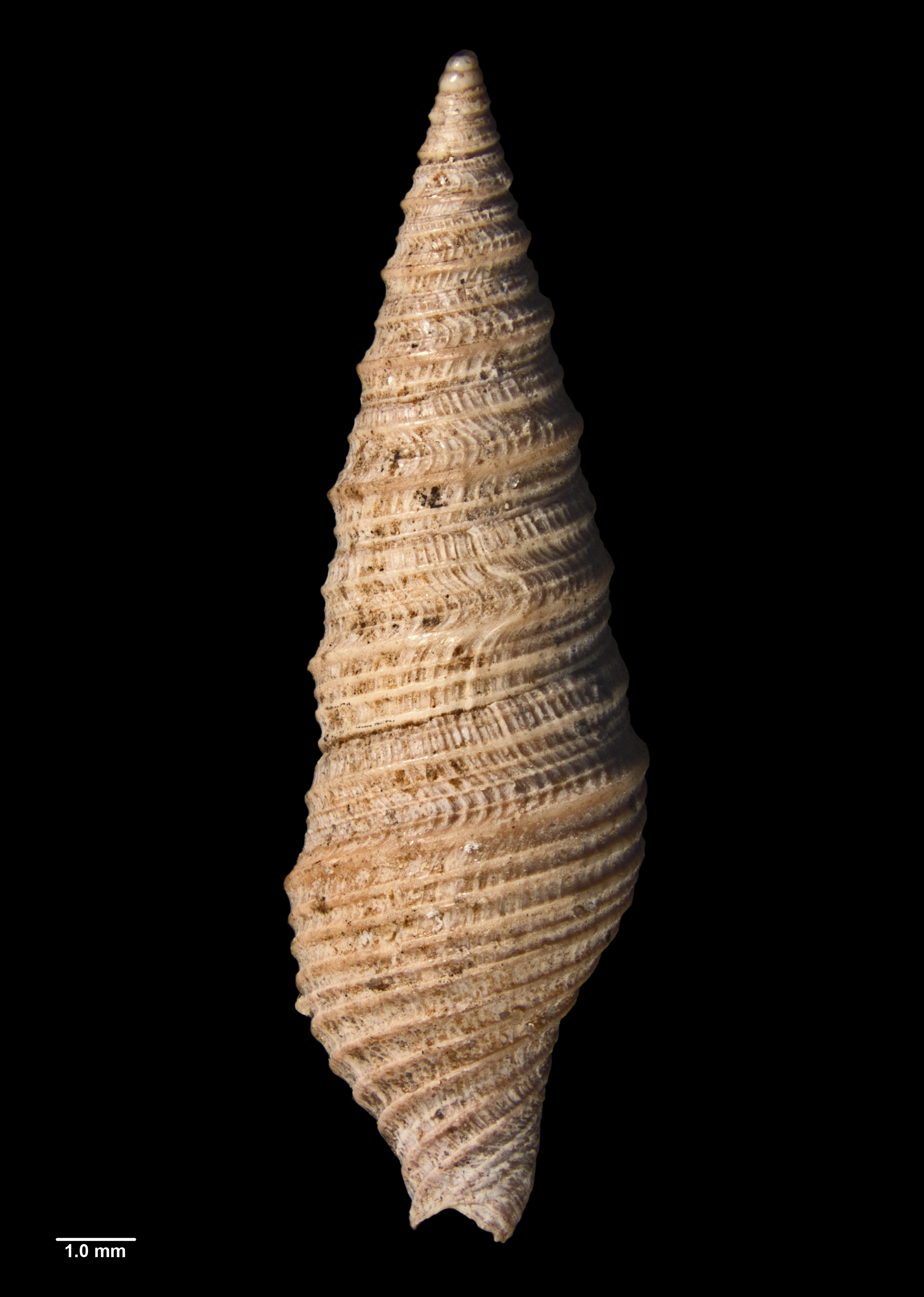
Reverse view of holotype

In the original description, Powell described the species as follows:

Shell much more slender than either dilectoides or the Recent subtilinea; body-whorl broadly arcuate, only slightly angulate, and with more numerous, closer-spaced spirals. Spire-whorls with the main carina just below the middle, two spirals submargin the suture, upper one a weak thread, lower one a strong cord, Two to three threads on the shoulder or sinus area, and two strong cords below the peripheral carina. About 23 spirals on body-whorl, 6 linear-spaced on anterior end. Interspaces on base 2 to 3 times width of cords. All interspaces delicately sculptured with closely-spaced flexuous axial threads. The base is more gradually tapered and the anterior end not so sharply pointed as in dilectotdes.

The holotype of the species measures 14.9 mm (0.59 in) in height and 4.6 mm (0.18 in) in diameter.

== Taxonomy ==
The species was first described by A.W.B. Powell in 1944. The holotype was collected from the Metropolitan Abattoirs Bore in Adelaide, Australia at a depth of between 122–152 m (400–499 ft) by Walter Howchin and Joseph Verco in 1919, and is held by the Auckland War Memorial Museum.

== Distribution ==
This extinct marine species dates to the middle Miocene (Bairnsdalian) and potentially the Late Pliocene, and occurs in the strata of the St Vincent Basin of South Australia, including the lower Dry Creek Sands, and potentially from the Roe Calcarenite of the Eucla Basin.
