= P. zealandica =

P. zealandica may refer to:

- Paralomis zealandica, the prickly king crab, a species of king crab
- Phenatoma zealandica, a species of sea snail in the family Borsoniidae
- Ponderia zealandica, a species of sea snail in the family Muricidae
