= Phenatoma decessor =

- Shell of † Phenatoma decessor (holotype)

Scientific classification
- Kingdom: Animalia
- Phylum: Mollusca
- Class: Gastropoda
- Subclass: Caenogastropoda
- Order: Neogastropoda
- Superfamily: Conoidea
- Family: Borsoniidae
- Genus: Phenatoma
- Species: †P. decessor

Binomial name
- †Phenatoma decessor Marwick, 1928

Extinct species of gastropod

Phenatoma decessor is an extinct species of sea snail, a marine gastropod mollusk in the family Borsoniidae.

== Description ==
The length of the shell is 17 mm, its width 6 mm.

Marwick considered this species a direct ancestor of Phenatoma rosea to which it closely resembles in shape and ornamentation.

== Distribution ==
This extinct marine species was endemic to New Zealand and fossils were found in fossiliferous beds of calcareous tuffs at Whenuaturu Peninsula.

== Bibliography ==
- Beu, A.G. & Maxwell, P.A. (1990). "Cenozoic Mollusca of New Zealand". New Zealand Geological Survey Paleontological Bulletin. 58: 302.
- Maxwell, P.A. (2009). Cenozoic Mollusca. pp 232–254 in Gordon, D.P. (ed.) New Zealand inventory of biodiversity. Volume one. Kingdom Animalia: Radiata, Lophotrochozoa, Deuterostomia. Canterbury University Press, Christchurch.
