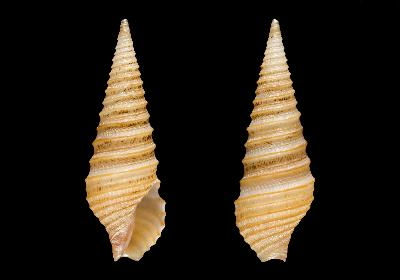
- Shell of Tomopleura fuscocincta (holotype at MNHN, Paris)

Scientific classification
- Kingdom: Animalia
- Phylum: Mollusca
- Class: Gastropoda
- Subclass: Caenogastropoda
- Order: Neogastropoda
- Superfamily: Conoidea
- Family: Borsoniidae
- Genus: Tomopleura
- Species: T. fuscocincta

Binomial name
- Tomopleura fuscocincta Gofas & Rolán, 2009

= Tomopleura fuscocincta =

Species of gastropod

Tomopleura fuscocincta is a species of small predatory sea snail, a marine gastropod mollusk in the family Borsoniidae.

This species was originally described by the malacologist G.W. Gaskoin in 1852, initially placed within the genus Pleurotoma before subsequent taxonomic revisions moved it to the genus Tomopleura.

== Description ==
The length of the shell attains 11 mm.

The shell of T. fuscocincta is characterized by its elongated, fusiform shape and distinct spiral sculpture. As a member of the superfamily Conoidea, it possesses a specialized radula used for hunting small invertebrates.

(Original description) The shell is slender and fusiform, featuring a high conical spire. Its protoconch consists of approximately three smooth, convex whorls; the body whorl possesses a narrow abapical keel that coincides with the suture. The nucleus measures 250 μm in diameter, expanding to a maximum diameter of 480 μm. The transition to the teleoconch is marked by several narrow riblets. These riblets begin almost axially in their adapical portion before curving markedly to follow the contour of the larval shell's "sinusigera" aperture.

The teleoconch is composed of seven to nine whorls adorned with a strong spiral sculpture. On the earliest spire whorls, this sculpture begins with one subsutural keel and another prominent keel on the abapical section, separated by a flat area that contains a smaller intermediate spiral cord. On later spire whorls, the strongest keel shifts toward the median part of the whorl, while a third cord emerges on the abapical edge, partially concealed by the subsequent whorl. The adapical intermediate cord gradually becomes more tenuous, eventually reducing to one or more spiral threads.

On the latest whorls, one or two additional threads appear abapically to the main keel. The body whorl features several extra acute cords below the main keel, which progressively decrease in size toward the abapical end. The concave furrows between these spirals are crossed by well-defined axial riblets that run parallel to the growth lines.

The aperture lacks a parietal callus on the columellar side. The siphonal canal is short and broadly open, while the adapical end of the aperture narrows into a small notch that reaches the suture. The outer lip is simple and exhibits a distinct U-shaped notch—located just adapically to the termination of the major keel at a short distance from the suture—and displays a convex profile when viewed from the side.

The shell is predominantly whitish or cream-colored, contrasting with darker brownish to purplish cords and a notably darker abapical end.

The living animal resembles Tomopleura spiralissima but is distinguished by the uniform, very pale buff coloration of its head-foot, completely lacking flecks. Its siphon is whitish, marked by only a few sparse yellow flecks.

== Distribution ==
This marine species occurs in the Atlantic Ocean off Angola.
