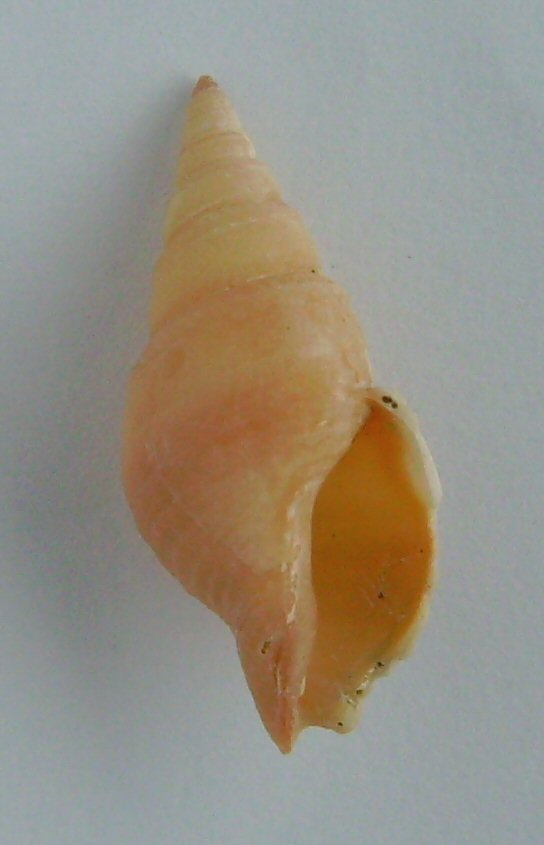
- Apertural view of a shell of Phenatoma zealandica

Scientific classification
- Kingdom: Animalia
- Phylum: Mollusca
- Class: Gastropoda
- Subclass: Caenogastropoda
- Order: Neogastropoda
- Superfamily: Conoidea
- Family: Borsoniidae
- Genus: Phenatoma; Finlay, 1924

Type species
- Pleurotoma novaezelandiae Reeve, 1843

= Phenatoma =

Genus of gastropods

Phenatoma is a genus of predatory sea snails, marine gastropod mollusks in the family Borsoniidae.

== Species ==
Species within the genus Phenatoma include:

- † Phenatoma decessor Marwick, 1928
- † Phenatoma lawsi Powell, 1942
- † Phenatoma perlata (Suter, 1917)
- † Phenatoma precursor Powell, 1942
- Phenatoma roseum (Quoy & Gaimard, 1833)
- Phenatoma zealandica (E. A. Smith, 1877)

Species brought into synonymy

- † Phenatoma (Cryptomella) crassispiralis Marwick, 1929: synonym of † Tomopleura crassispiralis (Marwick, 1929)
- Phenatoma novaezelandiae (Reeve, 1843): synonym of Phenatoma rosea (Quoy & Gaimard, 1833)
- † Phenatoma (Cryptomella) crassispiralis Marwick, 1929: synonym of † Tomopleura crassispiralis (Marwick, 1929) (original combination)
