= Pulsarella komakimonos =

Scientific classification
- Kingdom: Animalia
- Phylum: Mollusca
- Class: Gastropoda
- Subclass: Caenogastropoda
- Order: Neogastropoda
- Superfamily: Conoidea
- Family: Borsoniidae
- Genus: Pulsarella
- Species: P. komakimonos

Binomial name
- Pulsarella komakimonos (Otuka, 1935)

Synonyms
- Asthenotoma komakimonos Otuka, 1935 (original combination)

Species of gastropod

Pulsarella komakimonos is a species of sea snail, a marine gastropod mollusk in the family Borsoniidae.

== Description ==
This species has a superficial resemblance to Tomopleura oscitans Kilburn, 1986

== Distribution ==
This marine species occurs off Japan
