= P. rosea =

P. rosea may refer to:

- Palafoxia rosea, the rosy palafox
- Partula rosea, a gastropod species endemic to French Polynesia
- Petroica rosea, the rose robin, a small passerine bird species native to Australia
- Phenatoma rosea, the pink tower shell, a predatory sea snail species
- Primula rosea, the Himalayan meadow primrose, a flowering plant species

== Synonyms ==
- Paxtonia rosea, a synonym for Spathoglottis plicata
- Phalaenopsis rosea, a synonym for Phalaenopsis equestris
- Plumbago rosea, a synonym for Plumbago indica
- Potentilla rosea, a synonym for Fragaria × Comarum hybrids

== See also ==
- Rosea (disambiguation)
