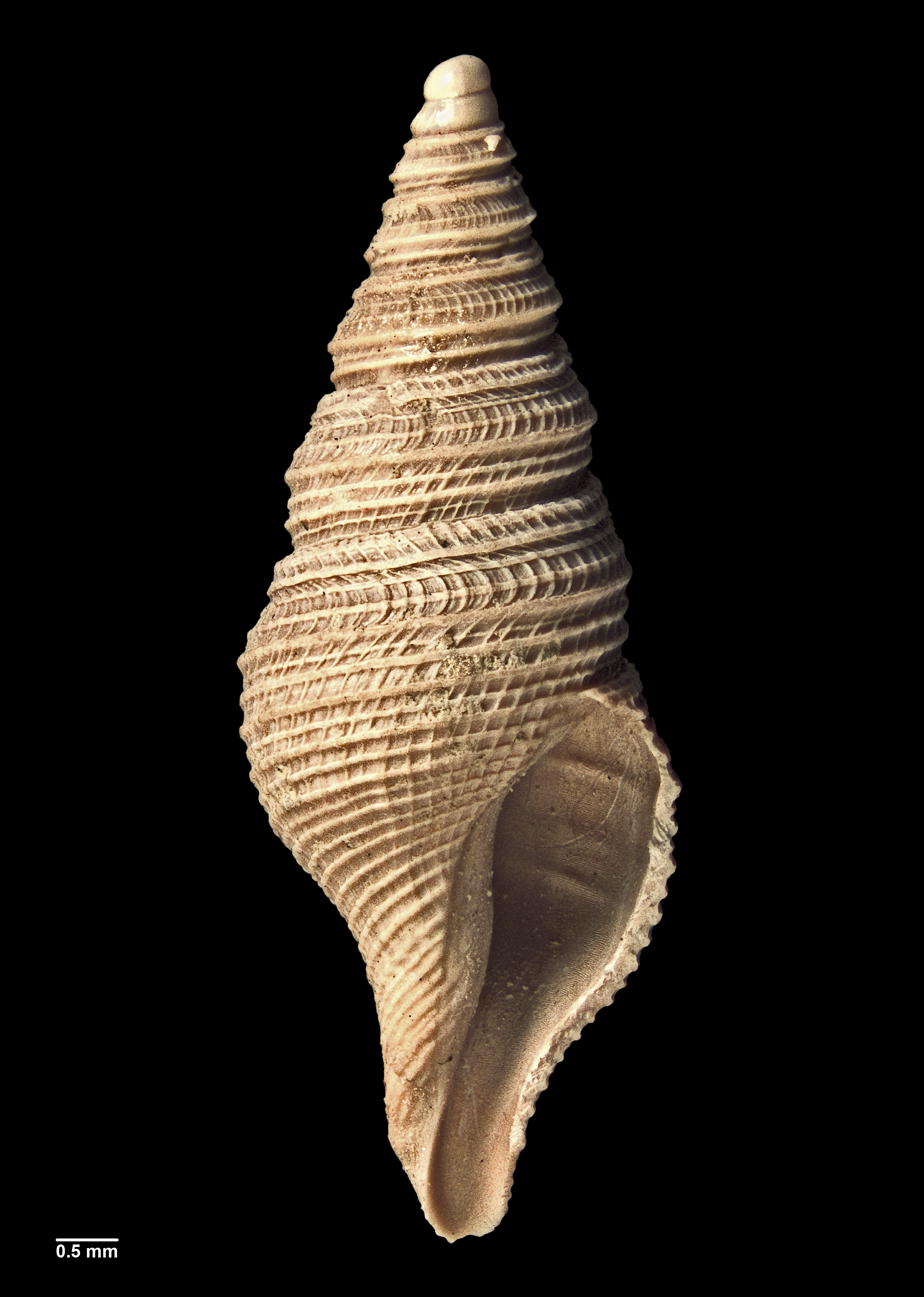
- Holotype from Auckland War Memorial Museum

Scientific classification
- Kingdom: Animalia
- Phylum: Mollusca
- Class: Gastropoda
- Subclass: Caenogastropoda
- Order: Neogastropoda
- Family: Borsoniidae
- Genus: Maoritomella
- Species: †M. balcombensis

Binomial name
- †Maoritomella balcombensis A. W. B. Powell, 1944

= Maoritomella balcombensis =

Maoritomella balcombensis Temporal range: middle Miocene

Extinct species of gastropod

Maoritomella balcombensis is an extinct species of sea snail, a marine gastropod mollusc, in the family Borsoniidae. Fossils of the species date to the middle Miocene, and are found in the strata of the Port Phillip Basin of Victoria, Australia.

== Description ==
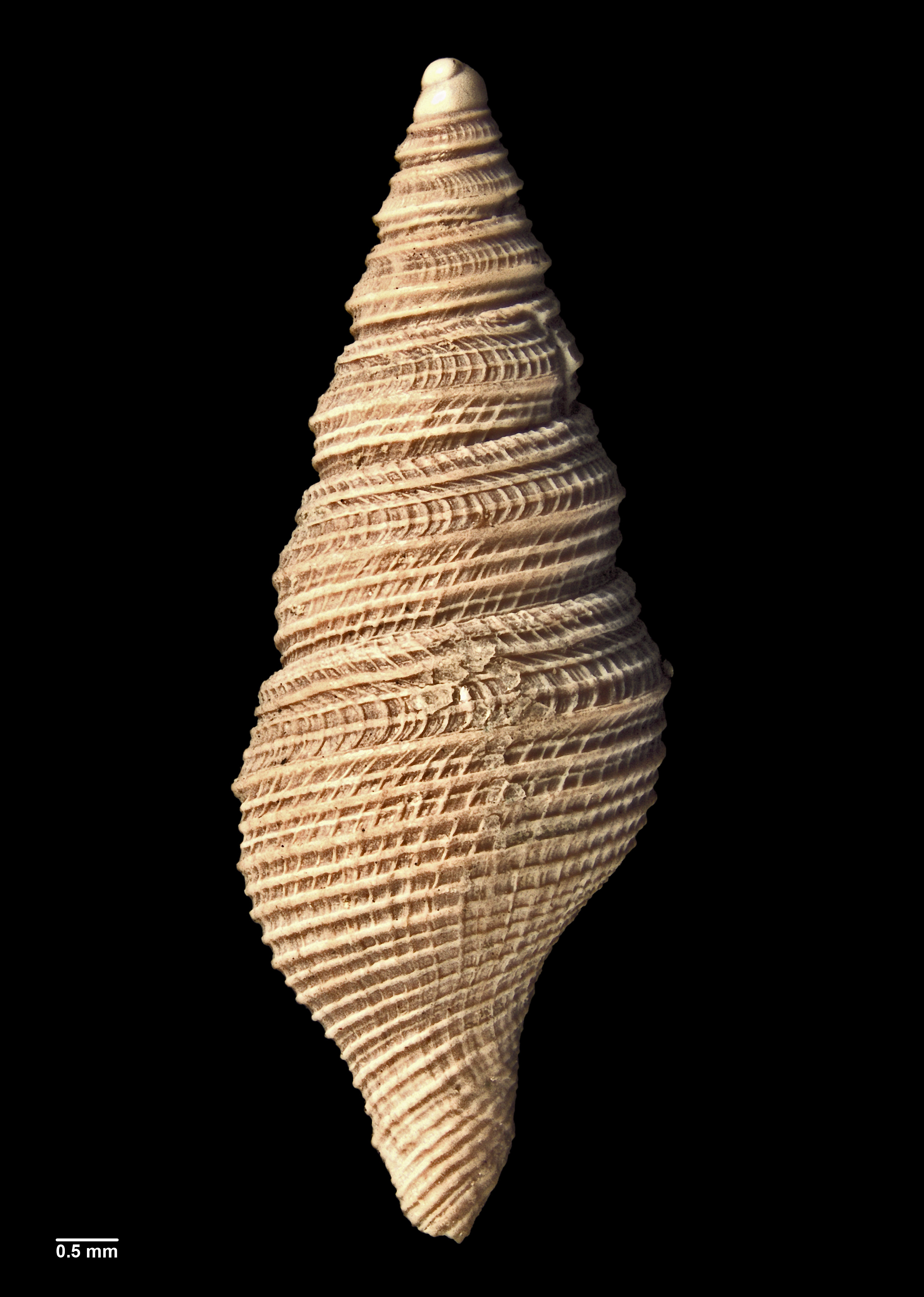
Reverse view of holotype

In the original description, Powell described the species as follows:

Shell slender, sculptured with rounded spiral cords and dense, flexuous interstitial axial growth striae. Whorls lightly convex, very slightly angled by a peripheral carina, situated about or just below the middle. Above the carina there are two closely-spaced narrow cords submargining the suture, and two distant threads on the shoulder. Below the carina there are two cords equal in strength to the peripheral carina. About 16 primary spirals over body-whorl from the carina to the anterior end. Body-whorl rapidly contracted over base, leaving a long, slender, slightly twisted neck and anterior canal.

The species has shells that measure 11.9 mm (0.47 in) in height and 4 mm (0.16 in) in diameter, with the holotype measuring 9.75 mm (0.384 in) in height and 3.5 mm (0.14 in) in diameter.

== Taxonomy ==
The species was first described by A. W. B. Powell in 1944. The holotype was collected from Fossil Beach, Balcombe Bay, Victoria, Australia, at an unknown date prior to 1945. It is held by the Auckland War Memorial Museum.

== Distribution ==
This extinct marine species occurs in middle Miocene strata of the Port Phillip Basin of Victoria, Australia, including the Gellibrand Formation.
