= Maoritomella megalacme =

Scientific classification
- Kingdom: Animalia
- Phylum: Mollusca
- Class: Gastropoda
- Subclass: Caenogastropoda
- Order: Neogastropoda
- Superfamily: Conoidea
- Family: Borsoniidae
- Genus: Maoritomella
- Species: M. megalacme

Binomial name
- Maoritomella megalacme Kilburn, 1986

Synonyms
- Tomopleura (Maoritomella) megalacme Kilburn, 1986

Species of gastropod

Maoritomella megalacme is a species of sea snail, a marine gastropod mollusk in the family Borsoniidae.

== Description ==
The height of the shell attains 5.7 mm, its width 2.3 mm.

== Distribution ==
This marine species occurs on the continental slope of Eastern Transkei, South Africa.
