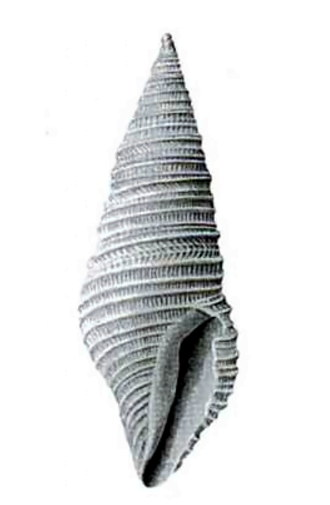
- Drawing of an apertural view of a shell of Tomopleura cicatrigula

Scientific classification
- Kingdom: Animalia
- Phylum: Mollusca
- Class: Gastropoda
- Subclass: Caenogastropoda
- Order: Neogastropoda
- Superfamily: Conoidea
- Family: Borsoniidae
- Genus: Tomopleura
- Species: T. cicatrigula

Binomial name
- Tomopleura cicatrigula (Hedley, 1922)

Synonyms
- Asthenotoma cicatrigula Hedley, 1922 (original combination)

= Tomopleura cicatrigula =

Species of gastropod

Tomopleura cicatrigula is a species of sea snail, a marine gastropod mollusk in the family Borsoniidae.

== Description ==
(Original description) The shell is lanceolate, rather small, and solid. The color is buff, sometimes tinged with violet, and the interior is pale purple. It has eleven whorls, including a mucronate protoconch of two and a half smooth whorls.

The sculpture consists of five elevated and polished spiral keels on the penultimate whorl, and seventeen on the body whorl, five of which are on the snout. Except for the protoconch and snout, the entire shell is covered by fine, closely-set, curved radial threads that are interrupted by the spirals.

The fasciole is well-marked and is located at half its breadth below the suture. The contained radial threads are arranged in a chevron pattern from a median spiral thread. The outer lip is simple, with its edge toothed by the external keels. The notch is deeply incised and widely gaping, and the lower limb is more horizontal than the upper. The inner lip is a thin smear, and there is no tubercle at its insertion. On the inside of the lip are six raised spiral threads that stop short of the edge.

The shell of Tomopleura cicatrigula is characterized by its elongated shape and intricate patterns.

The size of the shell may attains up to 15 mm.The coloration typically ranges from light to dark brown, with distinct markings that provide camouflage against the seabed. The aperture is elongated, and the outer lip is finely serrated, which is a common feature among species in the Borsoniidae family.

== Distribution ==
Tomopleura cicatrigula is endemic to Australia, where it is found off the coasts of the Northern Territory, Queensland, and Western Australia. This marine species inhabits sandy and muddy substrates in shallow waters, often at depths ranging from 10 to 50 meters.

== Habitat and Ecology ==
Tomopleura cicatrigula is adapted to life in marine environments, where it plays a role in the ecosystem as both a predator and prey. It feeds on small invertebrates, using its radula to scrape food from surfaces. The species is also preyed upon by larger marine animals, contributing to the food web dynamics of its habitat.
