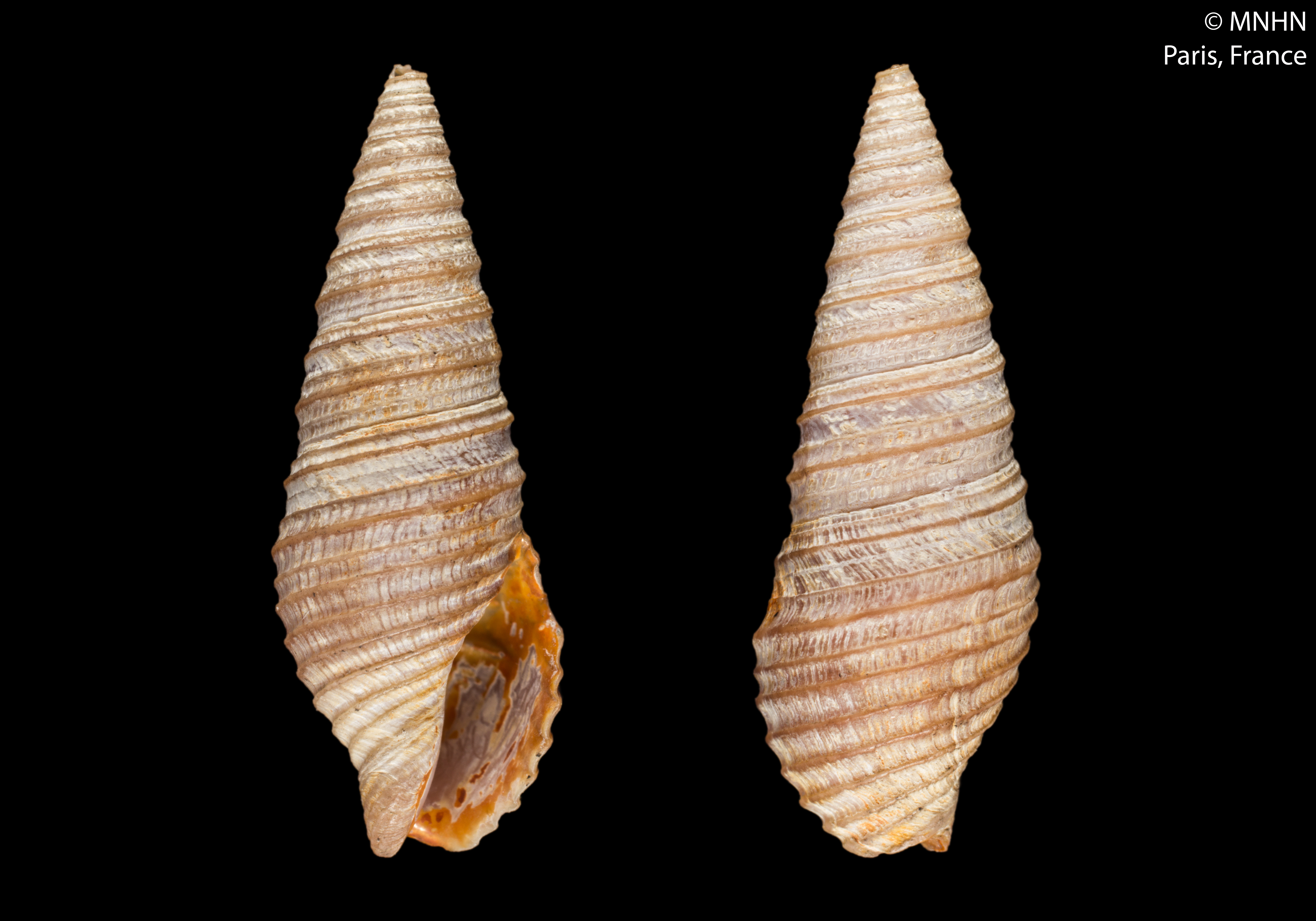
- Shell of Tomopleura pouloensis (syntype at MNHN, Paris)

Scientific classification
- Kingdom: Animalia
- Phylum: Mollusca
- Class: Gastropoda
- Subclass: Caenogastropoda
- Order: Neogastropoda
- Superfamily: Conoidea
- Family: Borsoniidae
- Genus: Tomopleura
- Species: T. pouloensis

Binomial name
- Tomopleura pouloensis (Jousseaume, 1883)

Synonyms
- Drillia vallata Gould, A.A., 1860; Oligotoma pouloensis Jousseaume, 1883 (original combination); Pleurotoma vallata (Gould, A.A., 1860)

= Tomopleura pouloensis =

Species of gastropod

Tomopleura pouloensis is a species of sea snail, a marine gastropod mollusk in the family Borsoniidae.

== Description ==
The size of the shell varies between 8 mm and 17 mm. The small shell is lanceolate and lurid. It contains ten shouldered and carinate whorls, with elevated revolving lines of which there are ten or twelve on the body whorl. The narrow aperture measures one-third the total length of the shell. The outer lip has a profound, wide sinus. The columella is smooth.

== Distribution ==
This marine species occurs off Sri Lanka, the Philippines and Hong Kong
