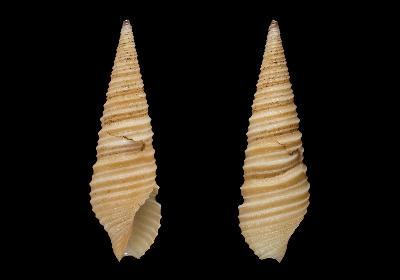
- Shell of Tomopleura tricincta (holotype at the MNHN, Paris)

Scientific classification
- Kingdom: Animalia
- Phylum: Mollusca
- Class: Gastropoda
- Subclass: Caenogastropoda
- Order: Neogastropoda
- Superfamily: Conoidea
- Family: Borsoniidae
- Genus: Tomopleura
- Species: T. tricincta

Binomial name
- Tomopleura tricincta Gofas & Rolán, 2009

Synonyms
- Asthenotoma spiralis Ardovini & Cossignani 2004, non (Smith, 1872)

= Tomopleura tricincta =

Species of gastropod

Tomopleura tricincta is a species of sea snail, a marine gastropod mollusk in the family Borsoniidae.

== Description ==
The length of the shell varies between 13.7 mm and 18.7 mm.

== Distribution ==
This marine species occurs in the Atlantic Ocean off West Africa and Angola.
