= Tomopleura regina =

Scientific classification
- Kingdom: Animalia
- Phylum: Mollusca
- Class: Gastropoda
- Subclass: Caenogastropoda
- Order: Neogastropoda
- Superfamily: Conoidea
- Family: Borsoniidae
- Genus: Tomopleura
- Species: T. regina

Binomial name
- Tomopleura regina (Thiele, 1925)

Synonyms
- Bela regina Thiele, 1925 (original combination)

Species of gastropod

Tomopleura regina is a species of sea snail, a marine gastropod mollusk in the family Borsoniidae.

== Distribution ==
This marine species occurs off Zanzibar.
