= Tomopleura retusispirata =

Scientific classification
- Kingdom: Animalia
- Phylum: Mollusca
- Class: Gastropoda
- Subclass: Caenogastropoda
- Order: Neogastropoda
- Superfamily: Conoidea
- Family: Borsoniidae
- Genus: Tomopleura
- Species: T. retusispirata

Binomial name
- Tomopleura retusispirata (E. A. Smith, 1877)

Synonyms
- Pleurotoma retusispirata E. A. Smith, 1877 (original combination)

Species of gastropod

Tomopleura retusispirata is a species of sea snail, a marine gastropod mollusk in the family Borsoniidae.

== Description ==
The length of the shell attains 7.9 mm, its width 2.7 mm. The elongate-subfusiform shell has a pale pink color and contains 8 whorls, of which two are contained in the vitreous protoconch. The next 5 whorls are bicarinate. Around the middle of each whorl there is a single nodose liration. The body whorl is rounded at its periphery and forms a short, recurved siphonal canal. The small aperture contains 6 - 7 spiral lirae. The margin of the outer lip is slightly crenulated. The middle of the columella shows two weak pleats. The base of the columella is torsed towards the inner lip.

== Distribution ==
This marine species occurs off South Africa.
