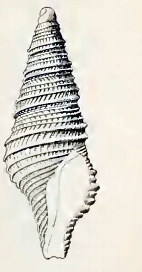
- Original drawing of a shell of Tomopleura dilecta

Scientific classification
- Kingdom: Animalia
- Phylum: Mollusca
- Class: Gastropoda
- Subclass: Caenogastropoda
- Order: Neogastropoda
- Superfamily: Conoidea
- Family: Borsoniidae
- Genus: Tomopleura
- Species: T. dilecta

Binomial name
- Tomopleura dilecta (Hedley, 1903)

Synonyms
- Asthenotoma dilecta May, W.L. 1921; Drillia dilecta Hedley, 1903 (original combination); Drillia dilecta parabolo Verco, J.C. 1909; Filodrillia dilecta (Hedley, 1903)

= Tomopleura dilecta =

Species of gastropod

Tomopleura dilecta, common name the beloved turrid, is a species of sea snail, a marine gastropod mollusk in the family Borsoniidae.

== Description ==
The length of the shell attains 7 mm, its width 2.5 mm.

(Original description) The small, solid, pale yellow shell has a narrowly fusiform shape. It is tricarinate. The shoulder is sloping; The base of the shell is contracted. The siphonal canal is short and straight. The shell contains 5 whorls, of which two in the smooth, elevated protoconch. The body whorl contains three peripheral spiral keels. There are two such keels on each whorl of the teleoconch. Revolving threads occur in great numbers on the base and three or four on the shoulder. The interstices of the spirals are occupied by the broken lengths of close, fine, longitudinal, raised threads, which united described a double curve. The aperture is simple but probably underdeveloped in the specimens at hand.

== Distribution ==
This marine species is endemic to Australia and occurs off New South Wales and South Australia
