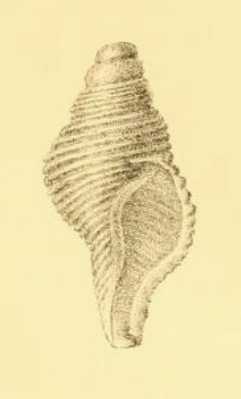
- Shell of Tomopleura thisbe (holotype)

Scientific classification
- Kingdom: Animalia
- Phylum: Mollusca
- Class: Gastropoda
- Subclass: Caenogastropoda
- Order: Neogastropoda
- Family: Borsoniidae
- Genus: Tomopleura
- Species: T. thisbe

Binomial name
- Tomopleura thisbe (Melvill, 1906)

Synonyms
- Drillia thisbe (Melvill, 1906) (unaccepted).

= Tomopleura thisbe =

Species of gastropod

Tomopleura thisbe (formerly known as Drilla thisbe) is a species of sea snail, a marine gastropod mollusk in the family Borsoniidae.

== Description ==
The shell is fusiform, smooth, solid and white. Its length is 6 mm and 1.75 mm in width. It has 6 turns: the 3 at the top are glassy and very smooth, while the rest are densely covered with thick spirally ridges.

The spaces between the spiraling ridges show faint stiation running lenghtwise, when viewed under magnification. The aperture of the shell is ovate-oblong. The lip is slightly flaired. The columella is almost straight and simple.

== Distribution ==
This marine species occurs in the Persian Gulf and Gulf of Oman.
