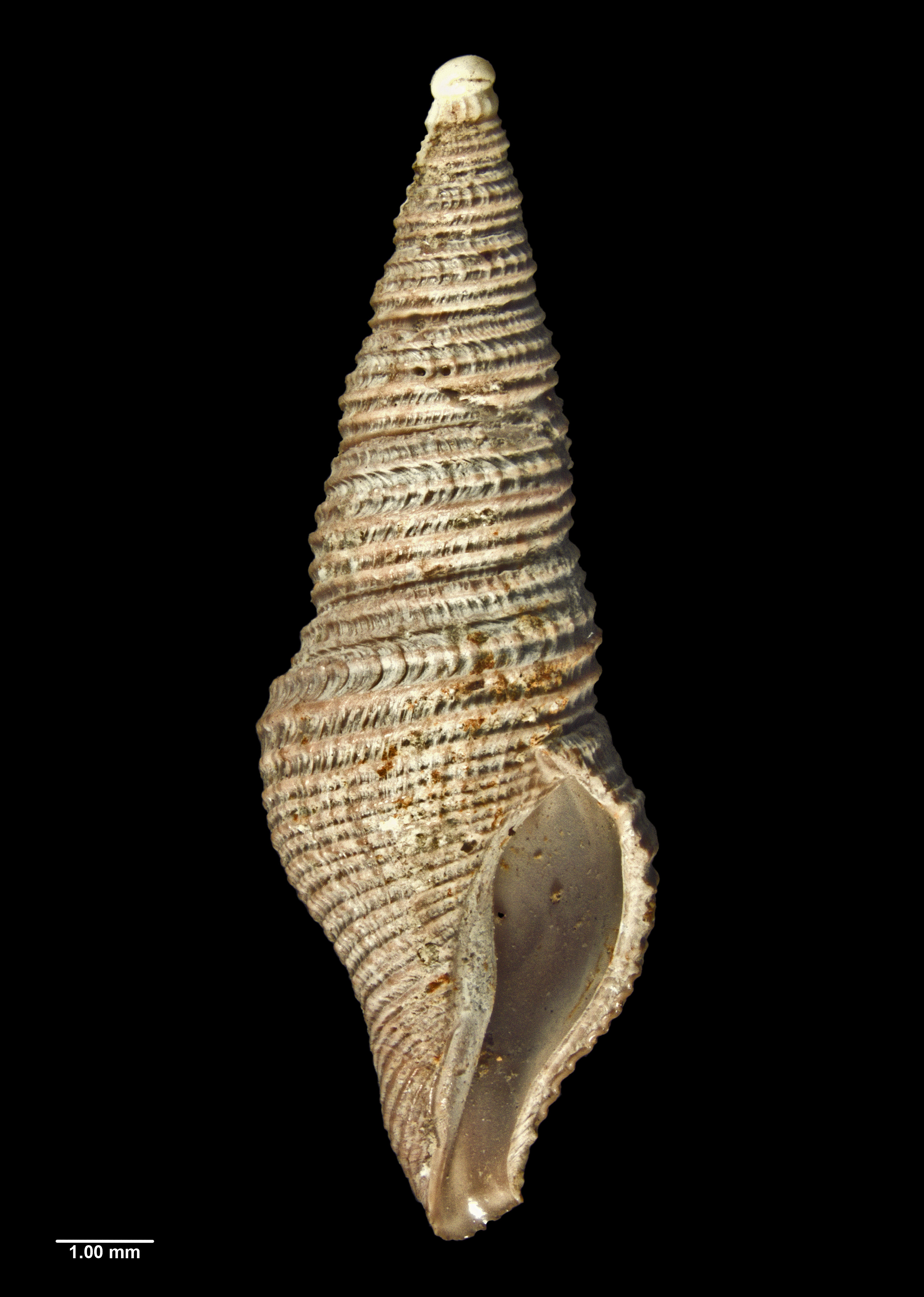
- Holotype from Auckland War Memorial Museum

Scientific classification
- Kingdom: Animalia
- Phylum: Mollusca
- Class: Gastropoda
- Subclass: Caenogastropoda
- Order: Neogastropoda
- Family: Borsoniidae
- Genus: Maoritomella
- Species: †M. equispiralis

Binomial name
- †Maoritomella equispiralis A. W. B. Powell, 1944

= Maoritomella equispiralis =

Maoritomella equispiralis Temporal range: late Oligocene

Extinct species of gastropod

Maoritomella equispiralis is an extinct species of sea snail, a marine gastropod mollusc, in the family Borsoniidae. Fossils of the species date to the late Oligocene, and are found in the strata of the Port Phillip Basin of Victoria, Australia.

== Description ==
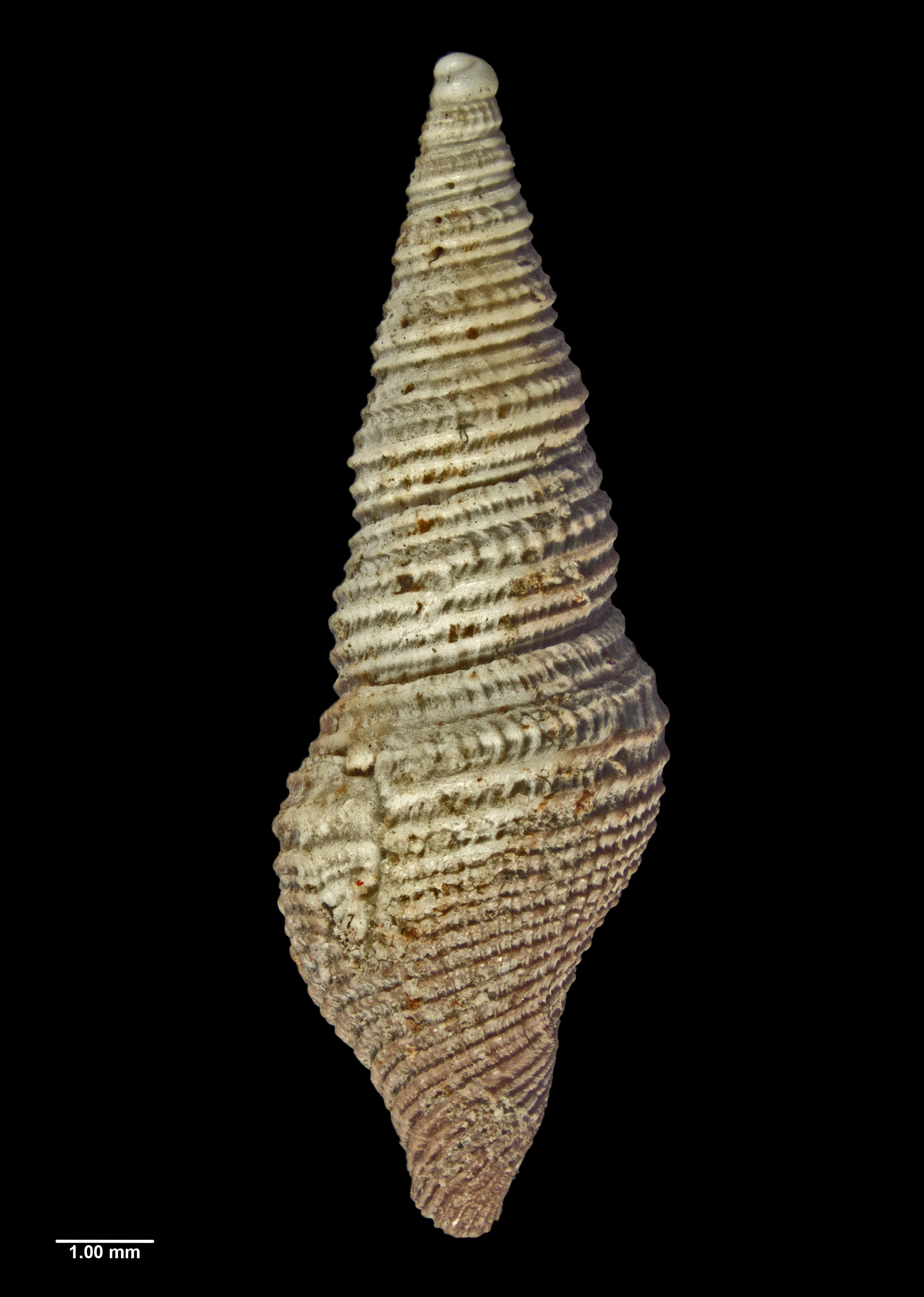
Reverse view of holotype

In the original description, Powell described the species as follows:

Shell slender, with lightly convex whorls; spire outlines almost straight; no peripheral carina. Spiral cords strong, more or less of equal development, 4 to 5 on early whorls, 6 from penultimate onward. About 25 spirals on body-whorl from suture to anterior end. Axial threads crowd the interspaces and actually cross and cancellate the weaker spirals.

The holotype of the species measures 12.5 mm (0.49 in) in length and has a diameter of 4.2 mm (0.17 in).

== Taxonomy ==
The species was first described by A. W. B. Powell in 1944. The holotype was collected from Torquay, Victoria, Australia, at an unknown date prior to 1937. It was held in the H.J. Finlay Collection, which was sold to the Auckland War Memorial Museum in 1937.

== Distribution ==
This extinct marine species occurs in late Oligocene strata of the Port Phillip Basin of Victoria, Australia, including the Jan Juc Formation.
