= Maoritomella densecostulata =

Scientific classification
- Kingdom: Animalia
- Phylum: Mollusca
- Class: Gastropoda
- Subclass: Caenogastropoda
- Order: Neogastropoda
- Superfamily: Conoidea
- Family: Borsoniidae
- Genus: Maoritomella
- Species: M. densecostulata

Binomial name
- Maoritomella densecostulata Kilburn, 1986

Synonyms
- Tomopleura (Maoritomella) densecostulata Kilburn, 1986

Species of gastropod

Maoritomella densecostulata is a species of sea snail, a marine gastropod mollusk in the family Borsoniidae, first described by R.N. Kilburn in 1986.

== Description ==
The height of the shell attains 4.6 mm, its width is 2 mm. It is light orange-yellow to brownish orange, maintained from its Protoconch stage.

It exhibits a fusiform-biconical shape, typical of the genus, with pronounced axial ribs and spiral lirae that create a cancellate (latticed) sculpture. Their protoconchs are 0.65 to 0.68 mm wide and 0.53 to 0.58 mm tall.

== Distribution ==
This marine species occurs on the continental slope of Eastern Transkei, South Africa, as well as off the coast of Mozambique. They live 74 to 200 m from the coast.
