= Tomopleura furcata =

Scientific classification
- Kingdom: Animalia
- Phylum: Mollusca
- Class: Gastropoda
- Subclass: Caenogastropoda
- Order: Neogastropoda
- Family: Borsoniidae
- Genus: Tomopleura
- Species: T. furcata

Binomial name
- Tomopleura furcata (M. Harzhauser, H. Raven, B. Landau, L. Kocsis, A. Adnan, M. Zuschin, O. Mandic & A. Briguglio; 2018)

Species of gastropod

Tomopleura furcata is an extinct species of sea snail, a marine gastropod mollusk in the family Borsoniidae.

== Etymology ==
The name furcata refers to the broad groove between its carina and suture.

== Description ==
Compared to other members of its genus, this Tomopleura species is of moderate size. The shell is a distinctively broad, fusiform (spindle) shape, characterized by a relatively short and notched siphonal canal.

== Distribution ==
This extinct marine species is found from the Tortonian of Brunei Darussalam.
