= Tomopleura carrota =

Scientific classification
- Kingdom: Animalia
- Phylum: Mollusca
- Class: Gastropoda
- Subclass: Caenogastropoda
- Order: Neogastropoda
- Superfamily: Conoidea
- Family: Borsoniidae
- Genus: Tomopleura
- Species: T. carrota

Binomial name
- Tomopleura carrota (Laseron, 1954)

Synonyms
- Maoritomella carrota (Laseron, 1954).; Narraweena carrota Laseron, 1954 (original combination); Tomopleura (Maoritomella) carrota (Laseron, 1954)

Species of gastropod

Tomopleura carrota is a species of sea snail, a marine gastropod mollusk in the family Borsoniidae.

== Distribution ==
This marine species is endemic to Australia and occurs off New South Wales.
