= Maoritomella pleonastica =

Scientific classification
- Kingdom: Animalia
- Phylum: Mollusca
- Class: Gastropoda
- Subclass: Caenogastropoda
- Order: Neogastropoda
- Superfamily: Conoidea
- Family: Borsoniidae
- Genus: Maoritomella
- Species: M. pleonastica

Binomial name
- Maoritomella pleonastica (Barnard, 1958)

Synonyms
- Drillia pleonastica Barnard, 1958 original combination); Tomopleura (Maoritomella) pleonastica (Barnard, 1958)

Species of gastropod

Maoritomella pleonastica is a species of sea snail, a marine gastropod mollusk in the family Borsoniidae.

== Description ==
The height of the shell attains 10.9 mm, its width 4.1 mm.

== Distribution ==
This marine species occurs off the Agulhas Bank, South Africa.
