= Cryptomella ebor =

Scientific classification
- Kingdom: Animalia
- Phylum: Mollusca
- Class: Gastropoda
- Subclass: Caenogastropoda
- Order: Neogastropoda
- Family: incertae sedis
- Genus: Cryptomella
- Species: C. ebor

Binomial name
- Cryptomella ebor Okutani, 1968

Synonyms
- Pleurotomella ebor (Okutani, 1968)

Species of gastropod

Cryptomella ebor is a species of sea snail, marine gastropod mollusks, unassigned to a family within the superfamily Conoidea.

== Distribution ==
The distribution of this species is native to Japan. Found by T.A. Okutani in 1968.
