= Maoritomella granilirata =

Scientific classification
- Kingdom: Animalia
- Phylum: Mollusca
- Class: Gastropoda
- Subclass: Caenogastropoda
- Order: Neogastropoda
- Superfamily: Conoidea
- Family: Borsoniidae
- Genus: Maoritomella
- Species: M. granilirata

Binomial name
- Maoritomella granilirata Kilburn, 1986

Species of gastropod

Maoritomella granilirata is a species of marine gastropod in the family Borsoniidae.

== Description ==
The height of the shell attains 6.4 mm (0.25 in), its width 2.5 mm (0.098 in). The shell is narrowly fusiform-biconic in shape and light brown in colour.

== Distribution ==
This marine species occurs on the continental slope of eastern Transkei (present-day KwaZulu-Natal), South Africa. The type series was obtained from the depth of 80 m (260 ft).
