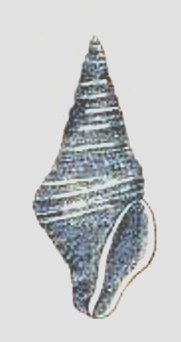
- Original image of a shell of Maoritomella subalbula

Scientific classification
- Kingdom: Animalia
- Phylum: Mollusca
- Class: Gastropoda
- Subclass: Caenogastropoda
- Order: Neogastropoda
- Superfamily: Conoidea
- Family: Borsoniidae
- Genus: Maoritomella
- Species: M. subalbula

Binomial name
- Maoritomella subalbula (R. Murdoch, 1900)

Synonyms
- Pleurotoma albula var. subalbula R. Murdoch, 1900 (original combination)

= Maoritomella subalbula =

Extinct species of gastropod

Maoritomella subalbula is an extinct species of sea snail, a marine gastropod mollusk in the family Borsoniidae.

== Description ==
The length of the shell attains 12 mm, its width 5 mm.

(Original description) The small shell has a fusiform shape. The is body longer than the spire. The shell contains eight whorls. The protoconch consists of two whorls, smooth and polished, the third usually irregular growth-lines only. The two succeeding whorls contain two spiral ribs, the anterior somewhat the stronger, and one or two spiral threads. On the next whorl, or antepenultimate, a sutural thread gradually strengthens, forming a third rib, which on the penultimate equals in size the posterior rib. In addition to these, there are two or three spiral threads between the subcentral and posterior rib, and a like number between the latter and suture. On the body whorl there are three spiral ribs in front of the aperture, usually less distinct as they approach the outer lip, and with one or two threads in the interspaces. Anterior to this are ten or eleven small spirals, somewhat irregular in size. Above the sinus are seven or eight threads, two of which are slightly stronger, and in some examples form small ribs. The whorls are transversely striate with growth lines, oblique on the sinus area. The aperture is narrow, slightly contracted below. The columella is straight, somewhat callused. The siphonal canal is short and slightly curved. The outer lip is thin. The sinus is shallow.

== Distribution ==
This extinct marine species from the Upper Cenozoic was found in New Zealand.
