= Tomopleura reciproca =

Scientific classification
- Kingdom: Animalia
- Phylum: Mollusca
- Class: Gastropoda
- Subclass: Caenogastropoda
- Order: Neogastropoda
- Superfamily: Conoidea
- Family: Borsoniidae
- Genus: Tomopleura
- Species: T. reciproca

Binomial name
- Tomopleura reciproca (Gould, 1860)

Synonyms
- Drillia reciproca Gould, 1860 (original combination); Pleurotoma reciproca (Gould, 1860)

Species of gastropod

Tomopleura reciproca is a species of sea snail, a marine gastropod mollusk in the family Borsoniidae.

== Description ==
The size of the shell attains 12 mm, its width 4 mm. The small shell is lanceolate. It contains ten slightly convex whorls bearing revolving carinae, of which there are 4–5 on the whorls of the spire, and 10–12 on the body whorl. The middle carina is stronger, the interspaces clathrate. The aperture measures one-fourth the total length. The sinus is broad and deep. The siphonal canal is short, wide and twisted.

== Distribution ==
This marine species occurs off Japan
