= Cryptomella transenna =

Scientific classification
- Kingdom: Animalia
- Phylum: Mollusca
- Class: Gastropoda
- Subclass: Caenogastropoda
- Order: Neogastropoda
- Family: incertae sedis
- Genus: Cryptomella; H. J. Finlay, 1924
- Species: C. transenna

Binomial name
- Cryptomella transenna Suter, 1917

Synonyms
- Leucosyrinx alta transenna Suter, 1917 (unaccepted); Tomopleura transenna Suter, 1917 (unaccepted)

Species of gastropod

Cryptomella transenna is a species of sea snails, marine gastropod mollusks, unassigned to a family within the superfamily Conoidea.

== Description ==
The height of the (holotype's) shell attains 11 mm, its diamiter 4 mm and has 8 whorls. Between the suture above and the prominent spiral ridge, there are 3 near evenly distant spiral lines.

== Distribution ==
This extinct marine species was found in New Zealand.
