= Tomopleura waiauensis =

Scientific classification
- Kingdom: Animalia
- Phylum: Mollusca
- Class: Gastropoda
- Subclass: Caenogastropoda
- Order: Neogastropoda
- Superfamily: Conoidea
- Family: Borsoniidae
- Genus: Tomopleura
- Species: T. waiauensis

Binomial name
- Tomopleura waiauensis Powell, 1942

Extinct species of gastropod

Tomopleura waiauensis is an extinct species of sea snail, a marine gastropod mollusk in the family Borsoniidae.

== Distribution ==
This extinct marine species from the Upper Cenozoic was found in New Zealand.
