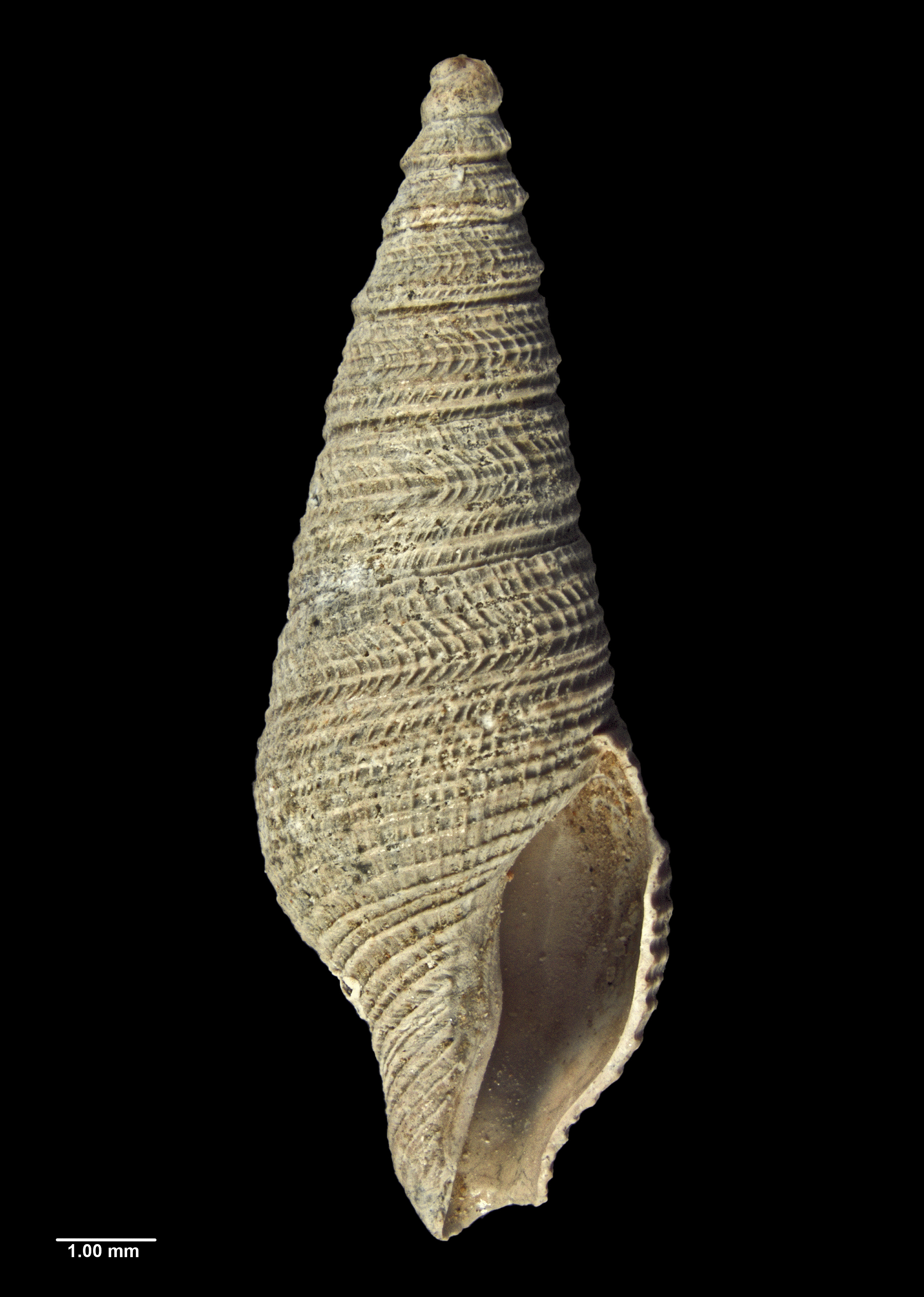
- Holotype from Auckland War Memorial Museum

Scientific classification
- Kingdom: Animalia
- Phylum: Mollusca
- Class: Gastropoda
- Subclass: Caenogastropoda
- Order: Neogastropoda
- Family: Borsoniidae
- Genus: Maoritomella
- Species: †M. nutans

Binomial name
- †Maoritomella nutans A. W. B. Powell, 1944

= Maoritomella nutans =

Maoritomella nutans Temporal range: middle Miocene

Extinct species of gastropod

Maoritomella nutans is an extinct species of sea snail, a marine gastropod mollusc, in the family Borsoniidae. Fossils of the species date to the middle Miocene strata of the St Vincent Basin of South Australia.

== Description ==
In the original description, Powell described the species as follows:

Shell tall and narrow, with slightly pagodiform spire. Outlines almost straight except for the inconspicuous peripheral carina at one fourth whorl height. Above the carina there are four fine threads grouped in pairs, two submargining suture and two on shoulder or sinus area. Below the carina there is a second spiral cord of the same strength as the carina, and a third just emerges from the suture on the body-whorl. About 26 spirals on body-whorl from suture to anterior end.

The holotype of the species measures 12.2 mm (0.48 in) in length and has a diameter of 4.5 mm (0.18 in). It is a moderately-sized member of Maoritomella with a large protoconch and two smooth whorls. The final half whorl has brephic axials.

== Taxonomy ==
The species was first described by A. W. B. Powell in 1944. The holotype was collected by W. Howchin and J.C. Verco in 1919 from the Metropolitan Abbatoirs Bore in Adelaide, South Australia, at a depth of 122–152 m (400–499 ft). It is held by the Auckland War Memorial Museum. Some fossils from the Metropolitan Abbatoirs Bore which had been identified as Asthenotoma subtilinea were later identified as members of M. nutans.

== Distribution ==
This extinct marine species occurs in middle Miocene strata of the St Vincent Basin of South Australia, including the Dry Creek Sands.

== Gallery ==
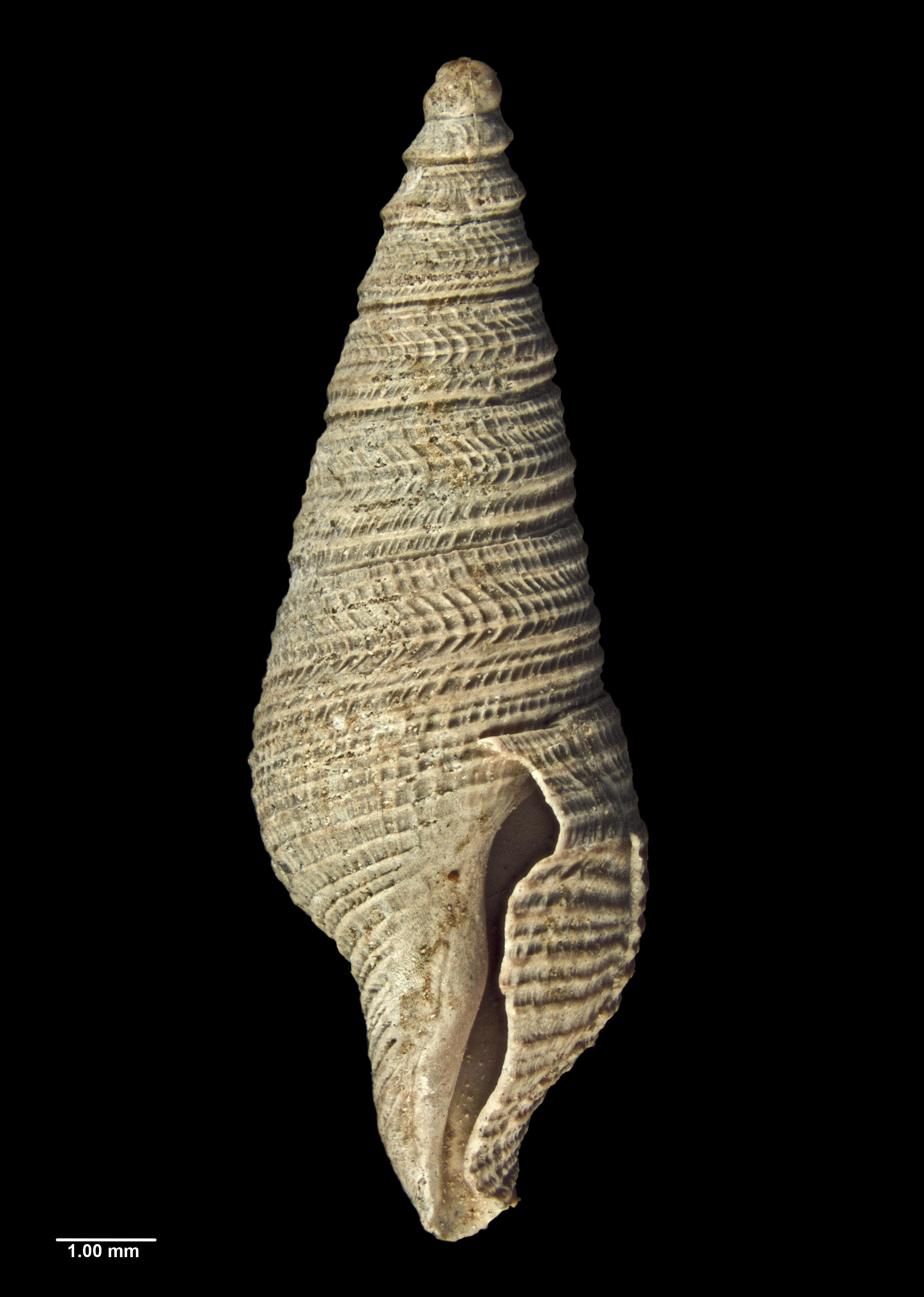
Side view of holotype

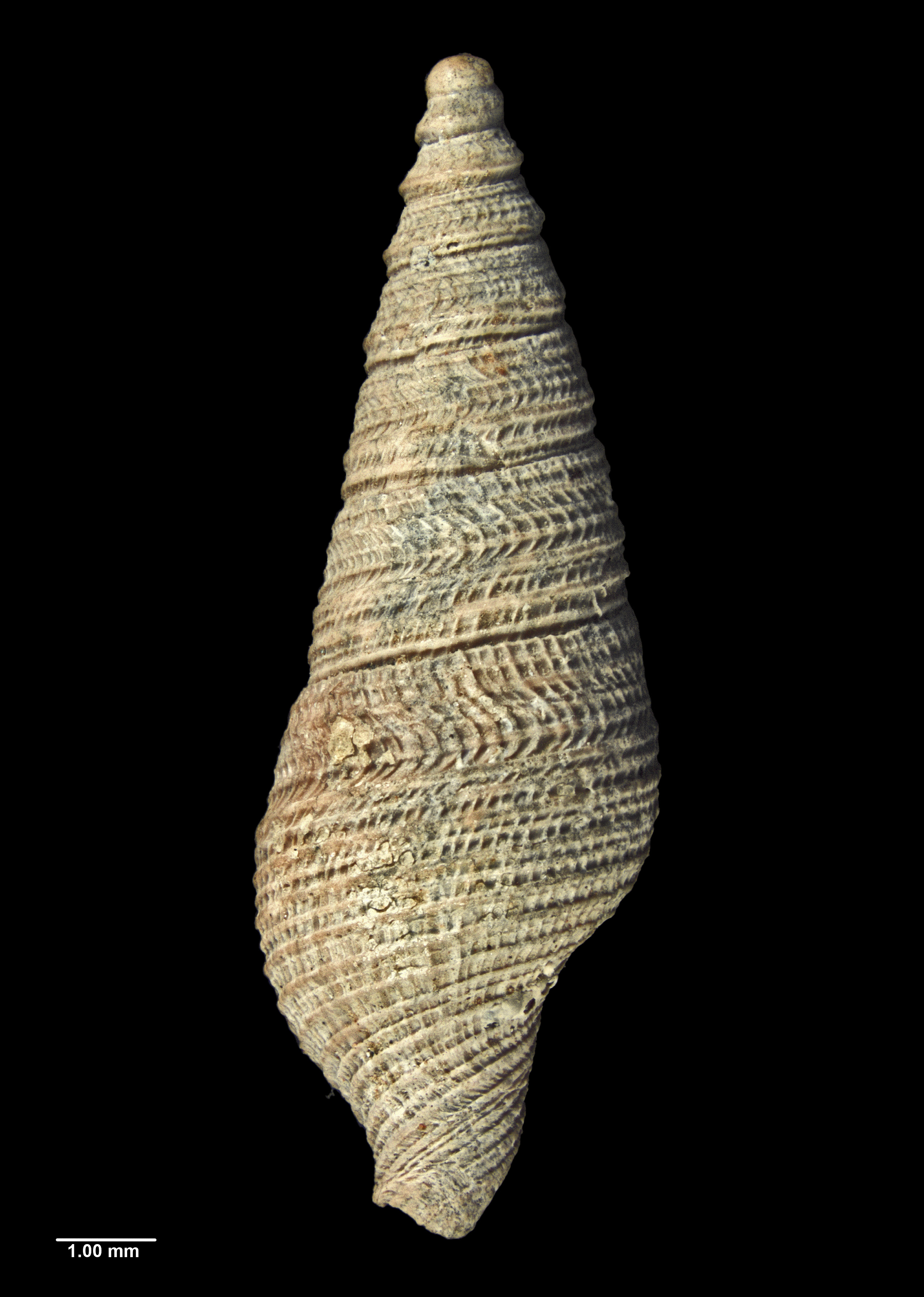
Reverse view of holotype
