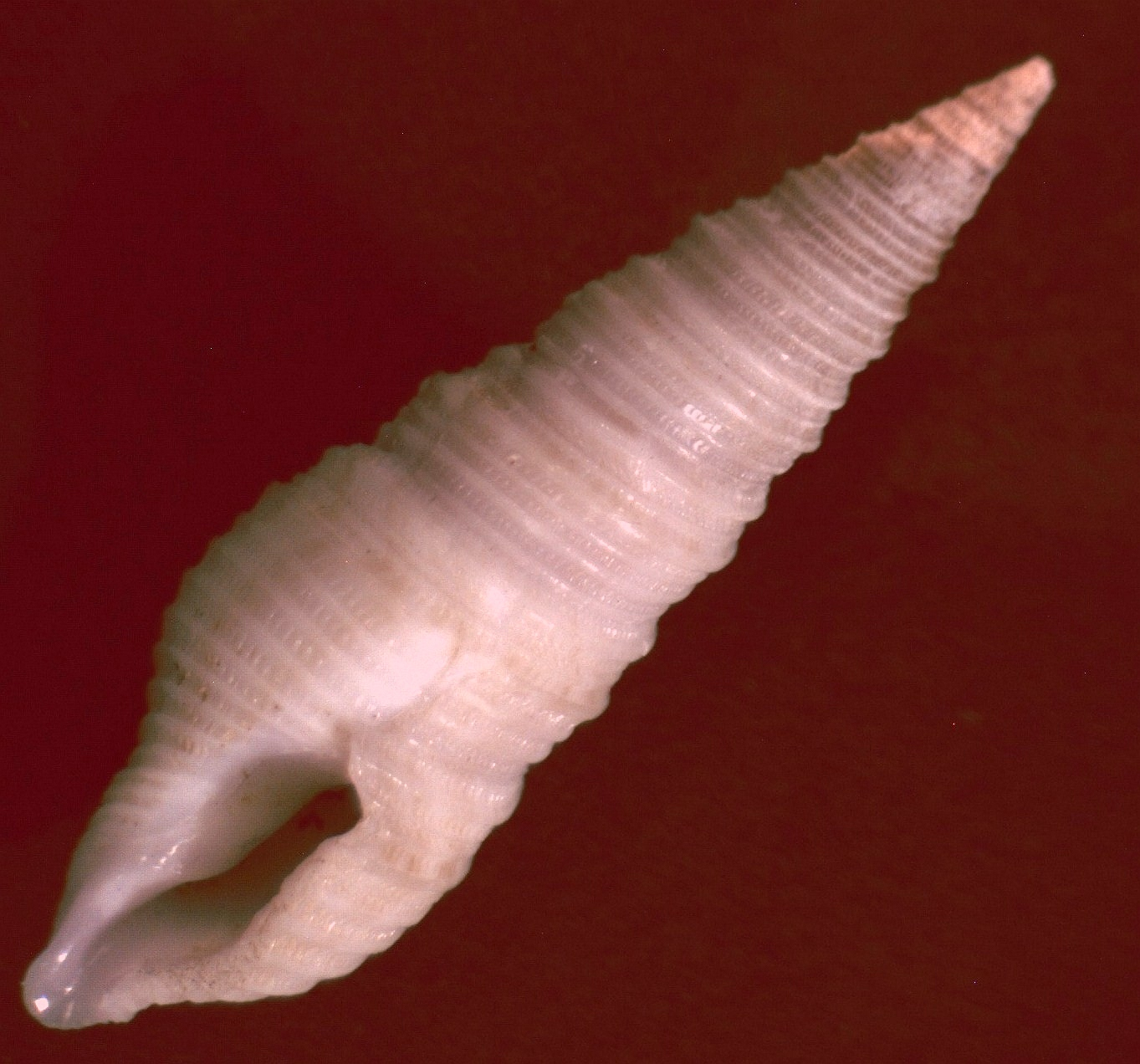
- Apertural view of a shell of Tomopleura vertebrata

Scientific classification
- Kingdom: Animalia
- Phylum: Mollusca
- Class: Gastropoda
- Subclass: Caenogastropoda
- Order: Neogastropoda
- Superfamily: Conoidea
- Family: Borsoniidae
- Genus: Tomopleura
- Species: T. vertebrata

Binomial name
- Tomopleura vertebrata (E. A. Smith, 1875)

Synonyms
- Asthenotoma vertebrata (E. A. Smith, 1875); Pleurotoma vertebrata E. A. Smith, 1875 (original combination)

= Tomopleura vertebrata =

Species of gastropod

Tomopleura vertebrata is a species of sea snail, a marine gastropod mollusk in the family Borsoniidae.

== Description ==
The length of the shell attains 20 mm.

== Distribution ==
This marine species occurs off South Africa, in the Persian Gulf and off Japan.
