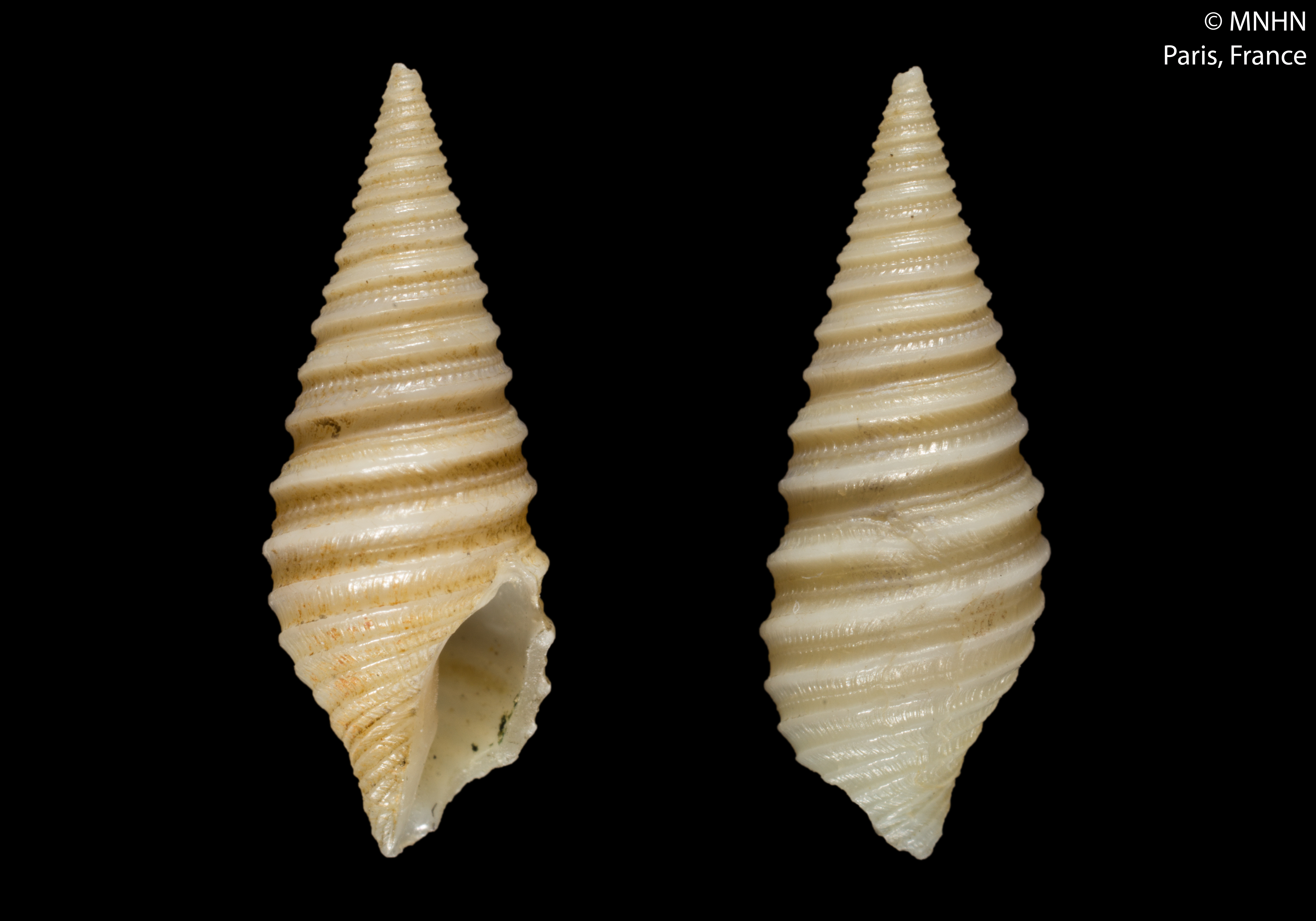
- Shell of Tomopleura bellardii (lectotype at MNHN, Paris)

Scientific classification
- Kingdom: Animalia
- Phylum: Mollusca
- Class: Gastropoda
- Subclass: Caenogastropoda
- Order: Neogastropoda
- Superfamily: Conoidea
- Family: Borsoniidae
- Genus: Tomopleura
- Species: T. bellardii

Binomial name
- Tomopleura bellardii (Jousseaume, 1883)

Synonyms
- Drillia bellardii (Jousseaume, 1883); Oligotoma bellardii Jousseaume, 1883 (original combination)

= Tomopleura bellardii =

Species of gastropod

Tomopleura bellardii is a species of sea snail, a marine gastropod mollusk in the family Borsoniidae.

== Description ==
The length of the shell attains 11 mm. The white shell is spirally costate. The outer lip is crenulated, with a shallow sinus near the suture. The columellar lip shows a median plication. (described from an immature specimen) (described as Drillia bellardii)

== Distribution ==
This marine species occurs off South Africa.
