= Maoritomella foliacea =

Scientific classification
- Kingdom: Animalia
- Phylum: Mollusca
- Class: Gastropoda
- Subclass: Caenogastropoda
- Order: Neogastropoda
- Superfamily: Conoidea
- Family: Borsoniidae
- Genus: Maoritomella
- Species: M. foliacea

Binomial name
- Maoritomella foliacea Laseron, 1954

Synonyms
- Tomopleura (Maoritomella) foliacea (Laseron, 1954 )

Species of gastropod

Maoritomella foliacea is a species of sea snail, a marine gastropod mollusk in the family Borsoniidae.

== Description ==
The height of the shell attains 4.8 mm, its width 2.2 mm.

== Distribution ==
This marine species is endemic to Australia and occurs on the continental shelf of New South Wales
