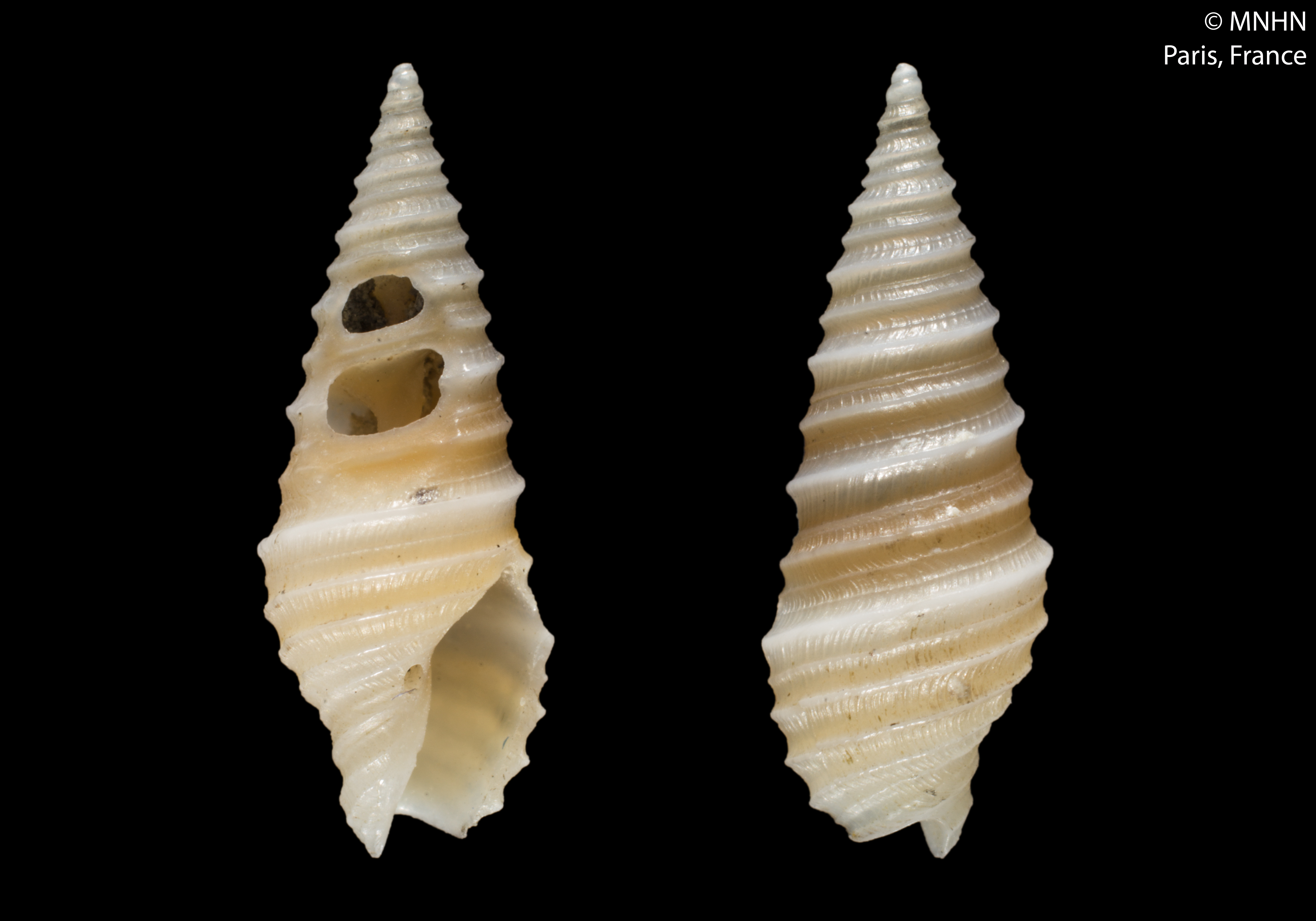
- Shell of Pulsarella clevei (lectotype at MNHN, Paris)

Scientific classification
- Kingdom: Animalia
- Phylum: Mollusca
- Class: Gastropoda
- Subclass: Caenogastropoda
- Order: Neogastropoda
- Superfamily: Conoidea
- Family: Borsoniidae
- Genus: Pulsarella
- Species: P. clevei

Binomial name
- Pulsarella clevei (Jousseaume, 1883)

Synonyms
- Drillia clevei (Jousseaume, 1883); Oligotoma clevei Jousseaume, 1883 (original combination)

= Pulsarella clevei =

Species of gastropod

Pulsarella clevei is a species of sea snail, a marine gastropod mollusk in the family Borsoniidae.

== Description ==
The length of the shell attains 9 mm. The shell is spirally costate. Its color is white, fasciate with light brown. The outer lip crenulate, ridged within, with a shallow, wide sinus. The columellar lip has a median callosity.

== Distribution ==
This marine species occurs off Sri Lanka
