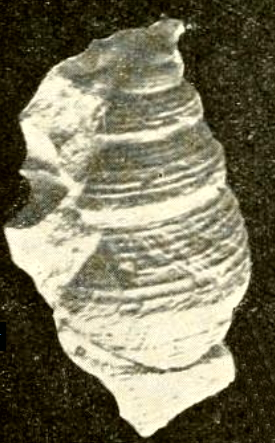
- Shell of Tomopleura striata

Scientific classification
- Kingdom: Animalia
- Phylum: Mollusca
- Class: Gastropoda
- Subclass: Caenogastropoda
- Order: Neogastropoda
- Superfamily: Conoidea
- Family: Borsoniidae
- Genus: Tomopleura
- Species: †T. striata

Binomial name
- †Tomopleura striata (P. Marshall, 1917)

Synonyms
- † Turris striatus P. Marshall, 1917 (superseded combination)

= Tomopleura striata =

Extinct species of gastropod

Tomopleura striata is an extinct species of sea snail, a marine gastropod mollusk in the family Borsoniidae.

== Description ==
(Original description) The shell is of moderate size, measuring 20 mm in height and 11 mm in maximum diameter. The spire consists of four whorls, each possessing a prominent carina near its posterior margin, which imparts a distinctly turreted morphology to the shell. Each whorl is ornamented with strong spiral cords. The penultimate whorl displays seven such cords posterior to the carina and three smaller ones anterior to it. The number of cords decreases on the apical whorls, with the protoconch appearing nearly smooth. The intersection of well-developed growth lines and the spiral cords gives them a slightly tuberculate appearance. The pronounced carina and spiral ornamentation on the body whorl serve as key diagnostic features distinguishing this species from other New Zealand Turridae.

== Distribution ==
This extinct marine species from the Upper Cenozoic was found in New Zealand;
