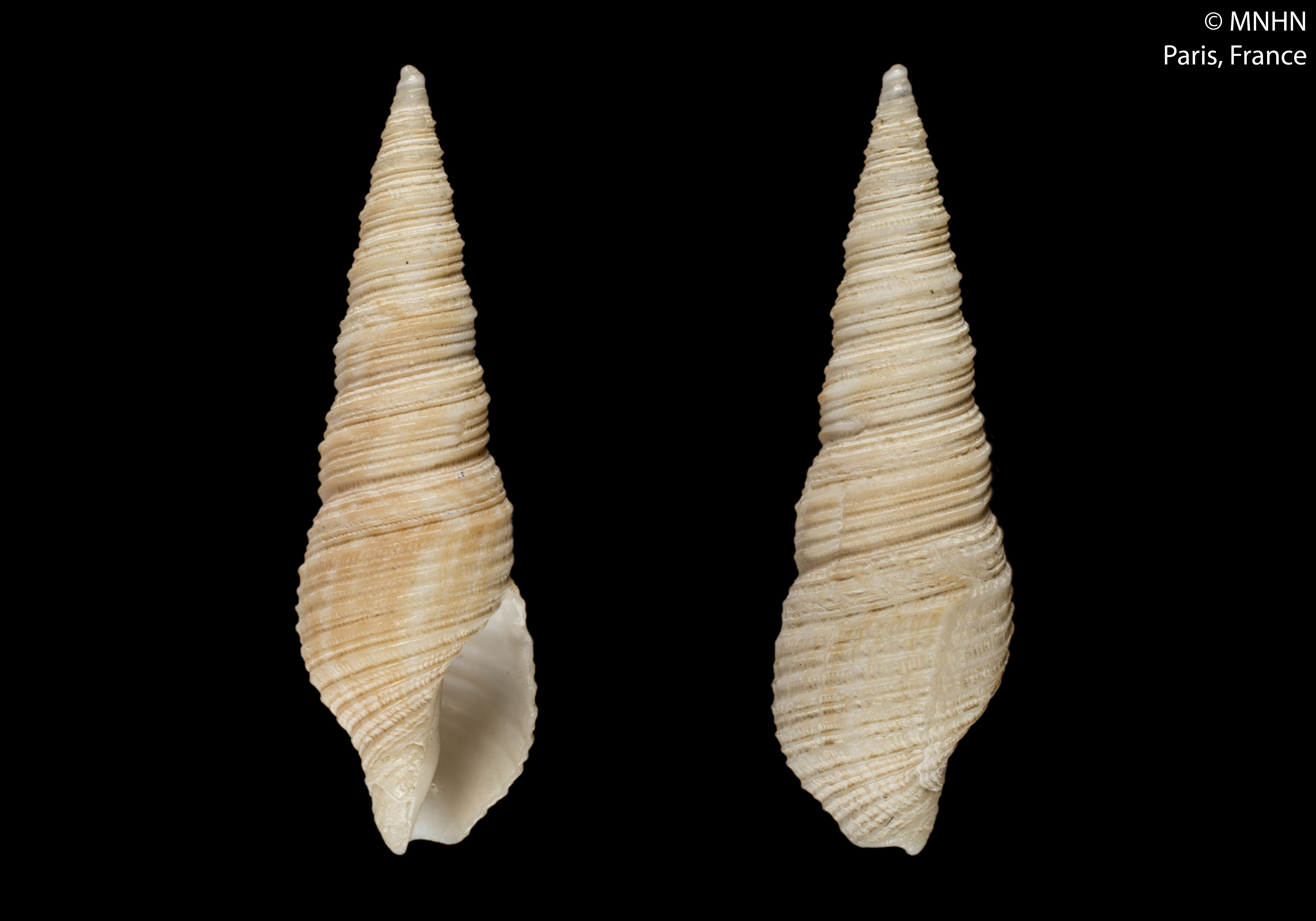
- Shell of Tomopleura nivea (lectotype at MNHN, Paris)

Scientific classification
- Kingdom: Animalia
- Phylum: Mollusca
- Class: Gastropoda
- Subclass: Caenogastropoda
- Order: Neogastropoda
- Superfamily: Conoidea
- Family: Borsoniidae
- Genus: Tomopleura
- Species: T. nivea

Binomial name
- Tomopleura nivea (Philippi, 1851)

Synonyms
- Asthenotoma vertebrata (non E. A. Smith, 1875), partim; Barnard, 1958; Drillia makimonos Tryon, 1884; Oligotoma makimonos Jousseaume, 1883; Pleurotoma (Crassispira) nivea Philippi, 1851 (original combination); Pleurotoma (Oligotoma) makimonos Jousseaume, F.P., 1883; Turris (Tomopleura) nivea var. makemonos [sic] Melvill, 1917

= Tomopleura nivea =

Species of gastropod

Tomopleura nivea is a species of sea snail, a marine gastropod mollusk in the family Borsoniidae.

== Description ==
The seashell ranges from 15 mm to 30 mm long.

== Distribution ==
This snail lives in the water between South Africa and Mozambique, and off the coast of Japan
