= Maoritomella torquatella =

Scientific classification
- Kingdom: Animalia
- Phylum: Mollusca
- Class: Gastropoda
- Subclass: Caenogastropoda
- Order: Neogastropoda
- Superfamily: Conoidea
- Family: Borsoniidae
- Genus: Maoritomella
- Species: M. torquatella

Binomial name
- Maoritomella torquatella (Marwick, 1931)

Extinct species of gastropod

Maoritomella torquatella is an extinct species of sea snail, a marine gastropod mollusk in the family Borsoniidae.

== Distribution ==
This extinct marine species from the Upper Cenozoic was found in New Zealand.
