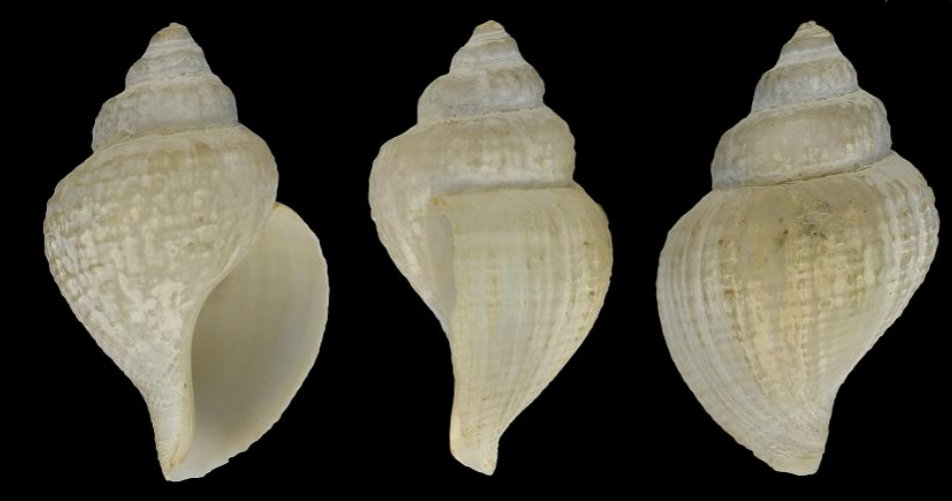
- Shell of Cryptomella oceanica (holotype at the Smithsonian Institution)

Scientific classification
- Kingdom: Animalia
- Phylum: Mollusca
- Class: Gastropoda
- Subclass: Caenogastropoda
- Order: Neogastropoda
- Superfamily: Conoidea
- Family: incertae sedis
- Genus: Cryptomella; Finlay, 1924

Type species
- † Leucosyrinx alta transenna Suter, 1917

Synonyms
- Phenatoma (Cryptomella) Finlay, 1924

= Cryptomella =

Genus of gastropods

Cryptomella is a genus of sea snails, marine gastropod mollusks, unassigned to a family within the superfamily Conoidea.

== Species ==
Species within the genus Cryptomella include:

- Cryptomella ebor (Okutani, 1968)
- Cryptomella oceanica (Dall, 1908)
- † Cryptomella transenna (Suter, 1917)
