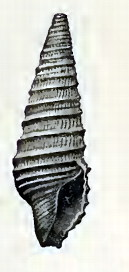
- Drawing of a shell of Pulsarella cognata

Scientific classification
- Kingdom: Animalia
- Phylum: Mollusca
- Class: Gastropoda
- Subclass: Caenogastropoda
- Order: Neogastropoda
- Superfamily: Conoidea
- Family: Borsoniidae
- Genus: Pulsarella
- Species: P. cognata

Binomial name
- Pulsarella cognata (E. A. Smith, 1877)

Synonyms
- Asthenotoma cognata (E.A. Smith, 1877).; Pleurotoma cognata E. A. Smith, 1877

= Pulsarella cognata =

Species of gastropod

Pulsarella cognata is a species of sea snail, a marine gastropod mollusk in the family Borsoniidae.

== Description ==
The length of the shell attains 24 mm, its width 7 mm. It differs from Tomopleura reevii (C. B. Adams, 1850) to which it is closely related in color (being luteous white, purple-tinged towards the apex, the carinae white), in the number of carinae, twelve, and more produced spire.

== Distribution ==
This marine species is endemic to Australia (New South Wales, Queensland).
