= Phenatoma perlata =

Scientific classification
- Kingdom: Animalia
- Phylum: Mollusca
- Class: Gastropoda
- Subclass: Caenogastropoda
- Order: Neogastropoda
- Superfamily: Conoidea
- Family: Borsoniidae
- Genus: Phenatoma
- Species: P. perlata

Binomial name
- Phenatoma perlata (Suter, 1917)

Extinct species of gastropod

Phenatoma perlata is an extinct species of sea snail, a marine gastropod mollusk in the family Borsoniidae.

== Distribution ==
This extinct marine species was endemic to New Zealand.
