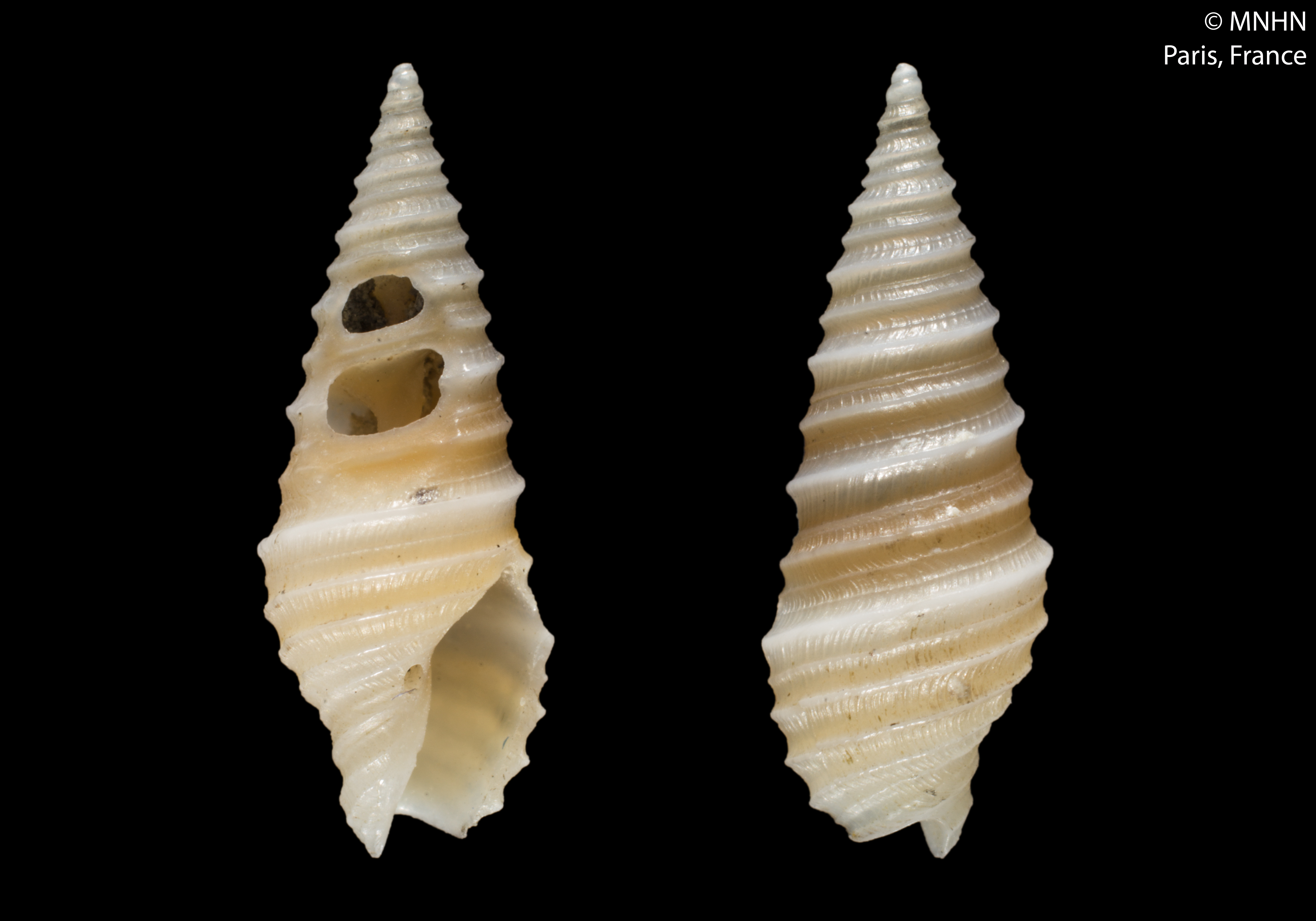
- Shell of Pulsarella clevei (lectotype at MNHN, Paris)

Scientific classification
- Kingdom: Animalia
- Phylum: Mollusca
- Class: Gastropoda
- Subclass: Caenogastropoda
- Order: Neogastropoda
- Superfamily: Conoidea
- Family: Borsoniidae
- Genus: Pulsarella; Laseron, 1954

Type species
- Pleurotoma cognata E. A. Smith, 1877

= Pulsarella =

Genus of gastropods

Pulsarella is a genus of predatory sea snails, marine gastropod mollusks in the family Borsoniidae.

== Species ==
Species within the genus Pulsarella include:

- Pulsarella clevei (Jousseaume, 1883)
- Pulsarella cognata (E. A. Smith, 1877)
- Pulsarella fultoni (G.B. Sowerby III, 1888)
- Pulsarella komakimonos (Otuka, 1935)

Synonyms

- † Pulsarella madiunensis (K. Martin, 1906): synonym of † Horaiclavus madiunensis (K. Martin, 1906) (superseded combination)
