= Tomopleura excavata =

Scientific classification
- Kingdom: Animalia
- Phylum: Mollusca
- Class: Gastropoda
- Subclass: Caenogastropoda
- Order: Neogastropoda
- Superfamily: Conoidea
- Family: Borsoniidae
- Genus: Tomopleura
- Species: T. excavata

Binomial name
- Tomopleura excavata (Hutton, 1877)

Extinct species of gastropod

Tomopleura excavata is an extinct species of sea snail, a marine gastropod mollusk in the family Borsoniidae.

== Distribution ==
This extinct marine species from the Upper Cenozoic was found in New Zealand.
