= Maoritomella orientalis =

Scientific classification
- Kingdom: Animalia
- Phylum: Mollusca
- Class: Gastropoda
- Subclass: Caenogastropoda
- Order: Neogastropoda
- Superfamily: Conoidea
- Family: Borsoniidae
- Genus: Maoritomella
- Species: M. orientalis

Binomial name
- Maoritomella orientalis Dell, 1956

Synonyms
- Tomopleura orientalis (Dell, 1956); Tomopleura (Maoritomella) orientalis (Dell, 1956)

Species of gastropod

Maoritomella orientalis is a species of sea snail, a marine gastropod mollusk in the family Borsoniidae.

== Description ==
The height of the shell attains 10.5 mm, its width 4 mm.

== Distribution ==
This marine species occurs off New Zealand and off Tasmania (Australia)
