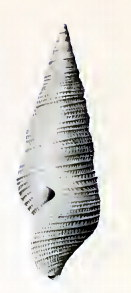
- Original image of a shell of Tomopleura subtilinea

Scientific classification
- Kingdom: Animalia
- Phylum: Mollusca
- Class: Gastropoda
- Subclass: Caenogastropoda
- Order: Neogastropoda
- Superfamily: Conoidea
- Family: Borsoniidae
- Genus: Tomopleura
- Species: T. subtilinea

Binomial name
- Tomopleura subtilinea (Hedley, 1918)

Synonyms
- Asthenotoma subtilinea Hedley, 1918 (original combination); Maoritomella subtilinea (Hedley, 1922); Pleurotoma violacea Angas (not Hinds); Tomopleura (Maoritomella) subtilinea (Hedley, 1922); Tomopleura (Tomopleura) vertebrata (var.) albida Bouge, J.L. & Ph. Dautzenberg, 1914

= Tomopleura subtilinea =

Species of gastropod

Tomopleura subtilinea is a species of sea snail, a marine gastropod mollusk in the family Borsoniidae.

== Description ==
The length of the shell attains 23 mm, its width 8 mm.

(Original description) The shell is rather large and solid, cylindro-conic, tapering evenly. It contains 10 whorls. Its colour is uniform grey.

Sculpture :—On the penultimate whorl are five larger and five smaller spirals. On the body whorl are twenty-five spirals, of which seven are on the snout, besides uncounted threads, one in each of the broader furrows. Numerous close-set radial threads lattice the spaces between the main spirals, but do not cross them. Three spirals run along the fasciole, the outer rows of radial bars there contained are set in chevron. The aperture is pyriform. The outer lip is simple. The notch on the shoulder is rather deeply incised.

== Distribution ==
This marine species is endemic to Australia and occurs off New South Wales and Queensland
