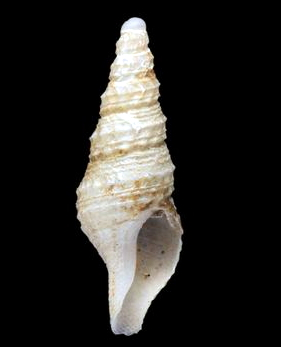
- Shell of Maoritomella ischna (specimen at the Natural History Museum, London)

Scientific classification
- Kingdom: Animalia
- Phylum: Mollusca
- Class: Gastropoda
- Subclass: Caenogastropoda
- Order: Neogastropoda
- Superfamily: Conoidea
- Family: Borsoniidae
- Genus: Maoritomella
- Species: M. ischna

Binomial name
- Maoritomella ischna (Watson, 1881)

Synonyms
- Pleurotoma (Surcula) ischna Watson, 1881 (original combination); Tomopleura ischna (Watson, 1881); Tomopleura (Maoritomella) ischna (Watson, 1881)

= Maoritomella ischna =

Species of gastropod

Maoritomella ischna is a species of sea snail, a marine gastropod mollusk in the family Borsoniidae.

== Description ==
The height of the shell attains 8.5 mm, its width 2.25 mm.

(Original description) The shell is high, narrow, and conical, with a blunt apex, a contracted base, and a longish aperture. It exhibits minimal sculpture and is strong, yellowish-grey, and porcellanous (ceramic-like).

Sculpture: Longitudinals: The shell displays only strong, regular growth lines, which rise into small tubercles, especially on the upper whorls. Between the stronger lines, the surface of the shell is delicately fretted with other very minute, sharp lines.

Spirals: The whorls are faintly keeled above the middle by a spiral thread, which is slightly stronger and more prominent than the others. Close above the suture is another thread, almost as strong, which slightly carves the whorls. Halfway between these is a finer thread that tends to split into two very fine threads. At the suture, but visible beyond the mouth, is another thread that defines the base here.

The longitudinal lines rise into very small tubercles as they cross the spirals; however, this feature is much stronger on the upper whorls, which appear reticulated. On the last whorl, the effect is feeble. Three very fine, equally spaced threads lie between the keel and the suture. The base and snout bear about twelve relatively equal, fine threads.

The colour of the shell is a faintly yellowish grey. The epidermis is extremely thin and smooth.

The spire is conical with an almost unbroken profile, as the whorls are scarcely convex. There are barely two embryonic whorls in the protoconch; they are smooth and globose, not flattened down at the tip, which, however, is slightly immersed. There are 7 whorls in total. They are feebly keeled with a just-perceptibly concave line running from the suture to the keel, and from the keel to the suture below. Just above the suture, there is a slight contraction that forms a faint superior margination. The body whorl is very slightly swollen; the base contracts rather rapidly and is drawn out into a rather long, straight, but not narrow snout. The suture is distinct and impressed.

The aperture is almost club-shaped, being pointedly oval above, with a longish, rather sinuous siphonal canal below.

The outer lip forms a regular curve until it reaches the siphonal canal, where it becomes flattened and oblique. From the body, it immediately retreats to form the rather deep, rounded, open-mouthed sinus. From the sinus, it advances on a very straight line to the edge of the siphonal canal in front, where it bends slowly and slightly backward. The outer lip is open throughout but is not flaring except at the point of the canal.

The inner lip spreads as a narrow porcellanous glaze on the body and columella. It is slightly hollowed out on the body and is straight on the columella. Toward the front of the columella, it is cut off with a narrow, rounded, and very slightly oblique edge.

== Distribution ==
This marine species occurs off New Zealand and off Tasmania (Australia).

This species is typically found in deep-sea environments, where it plays a role in the complex marine ecosystem as a predator or scavenger.
