= Tomopleura oscitans =

Scientific classification
- Kingdom: Animalia
- Phylum: Mollusca
- Class: Gastropoda
- Subclass: Caenogastropoda
- Order: Neogastropoda
- Superfamily: Conoidea
- Family: Borsoniidae
- Genus: Tomopleura
- Species: T. oscitans

Binomial name
- Tomopleura oscitans Kilburn, 1986

Synonyms
- Asthenotoma vertebrata (partim); Barnard, 1958; Pleurotoma vertebrata (non E. A. Smith, 1875); E. A. Smith, 1903

Species of gastropod

Tomopleura oscitans is a species of sea snail, a marine gastropod mollusk in the family Borsoniidae.

== Description ==
The size of the shell varies between 15 mm and 23 mm. It has 9 whorls in the teleoconch.

== Distribution ==
This marine species occurs off Durban Bay, South Africa, to southern Mozambique; littoral to about 27 m on clean sand.
