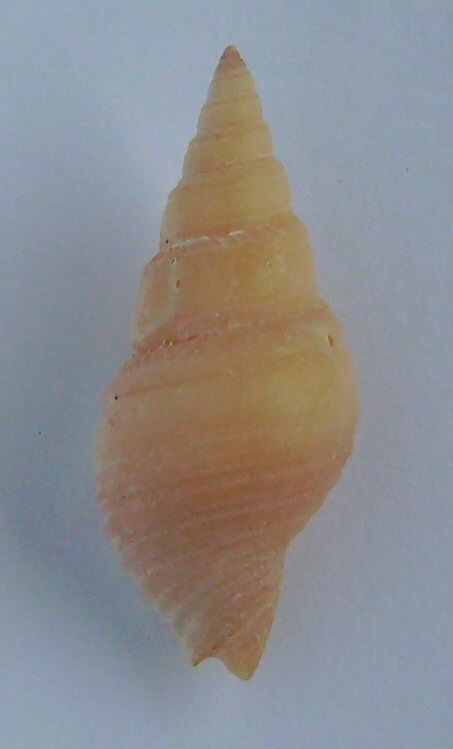
- Abapertural view of a shell of Phenatoma zealandica

Scientific classification
- Kingdom: Animalia
- Phylum: Mollusca
- Class: Gastropoda
- Subclass: Caenogastropoda
- Order: Neogastropoda
- Superfamily: Conoidea
- Family: Borsoniidae
- Genus: Phenatoma
- Species: P. zealandica

Binomial name
- Phenatoma zealandica (E. A. Smith, 1877)

Synonyms
- Pleurotoma zealandica E. A. Smith, 1877; Drillia cheesemani Hutton, 1878

= Phenatoma zealandica =

Species of gastropod

Phenatoma zealandica, common name the New Zealand turrid, is a species of predatory sea snail, a marine gastropod mollusc in the family Borsoniidae.

== Description ==
The size of an adult shell varies between 10 mm and 23 mm.

(Original description) The shell has a flesh-white color. The acuminate spire has a dark brown apex. The shell contains 10 whorls. The first two are polished, vitreous and convex. The others are rather convex, keeled above and flattened sloping downwards. The large body whorl is somewhat inflated and contracted towards the base. It contains about 12 strong furrows, longitudinally striated. The dark aperture is ample. The oblique columella is brownish, curved in the middle. The short siphonal canal is slightly curved.

This species is remarkable for the tabulated whorls, the tabulations being very strongly radiately striated, and sometimes furnished with a spiral liration, and the conspicuous sulcations encircling the body whorl. The slit in the lip is situated just below the broad furrow which grooves the upper part of the whorls.

== Distribution ==
This marine species is endemic to New Zealand.
