= Tomopleura spiralissima =

- Drawing of a shell of Tomopleura spiralissima

Scientific classification
- Kingdom: Animalia
- Phylum: Mollusca
- Class: Gastropoda
- Subclass: Caenogastropoda
- Order: Neogastropoda
- Superfamily: Conoidea
- Family: Borsoniidae
- Genus: Tomopleura
- Species: T. spiralissima

Binomial name
- Tomopleura spiralissima Gofas & Rolán, 2009

Synonyms
- Asthenotoma spiralis (E. A. Smith, 1872); Pleurotoma spiralis E. A. Smith, 1872 (Invalid: primary homonym of Pleurotoma spiralis de Serres, 1829 [fossil])

Species of gastropod

Tomopleura spiralissima is a species of sea snail, a marine gastropod mollusk in the family Borsoniidae.

== Description ==
The length of the shell varies between 9.5 mm and 20.7 mm.

The pallid brown shell has a fusiform shape. It is cingulated with carinae, of which there are about twelve on the body whorl, subequal, interstices obliquely striate. The aperture is narrow. The collumella is blackish brown. The siphonal canal is very short. The outer lip is thin, with a large sinus.

== Distribution ==
This marine species occurs in the Atlantic Ocean off West Africa, Congo and Angola
