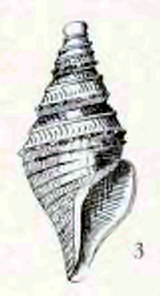
- Drawing of a shell of Maoritomella multiplex

Scientific classification
- Kingdom: Animalia
- Phylum: Mollusca
- Class: Gastropoda
- Subclass: Caenogastropoda
- Order: Neogastropoda
- Superfamily: Conoidea
- Family: Borsoniidae
- Genus: Maoritomella
- Species: M. multiplex

Binomial name
- Maoritomella multiplex (Webster, 1906)

Synonyms
- Drillia multiplex Webster, 1906 (original combination); Tomopleura multiplex (Webster, 1906); Tomopleura (Maoritomella) multiplex (Webster, 1906)

= Maoritomella multiplex =

Species of gastropod

Maoritomella multiplex is a species of sea snail, a marine gastropod mollusk in the family Borsoniidae.

== Description ==
The height of the shell attains 5.5 mm, its width 2.5 mm. The white and chalky shell has a fusiform shape. Fresh specimens are pale pink. The shell shows no axial sculpture. The whorls contain a smooth upper and a gemmate lower keel. The protoconch is smooth. The height of the spire equals about that of the aperture with siphonal canal.

Each whorl is tabulated below the suture, and the tabulation ends anteriorly in a prominent spiral thread. Then follows a second tabulation, terminating in a row of oval gemmules, about 15 mm on the body whorl. Just posterior to the gemmules is a fine spiral thread carrying the abruptly curved sharp threads of the anal sinus. These threads are regularly interspaced, elevated, and very distinct on both tabulations. They are covered by the first spiral, but override the second with a sharp downward bend. On the body whorl they change their character, becoming mere striations, and more numerous than in the fasciole of the anal sinus. A second slightly gemmed thread appears on the body whorl, and 2 fine spiral lines on the anterior tabulation. On the base of the shell there are 4 strong spirals, and on the siphonal canal about 10 much weaker.

The spire is conic, very little higher than the aperture. The glossy protoconch contains 1 whorl. The teleoconch consists of 5 convex whorls, tabulated and with the base contracted. The aperture is pyriform, with a short narrow and straight siphonal canal below. The outer lip is broken off. The columella is straight, drawn out to a fine point below. The inner lip is narrow, spreading over the nearly straight parietal wall. The operculum is unknown.

== Distribution ==
This marine species occurs off New Zealand and off Tasmania (Australia)
