= Tomopleura crassispiralis =

Scientific classification
- Kingdom: Animalia
- Phylum: Mollusca
- Class: Gastropoda
- Subclass: Caenogastropoda
- Order: Neogastropoda
- Superfamily: Conoidea
- Family: Borsoniidae
- Genus: Tomopleura
- Species: T. crassispiralis

Binomial name
- Tomopleura crassispiralis (Marwick, 1929)

Synonyms
- † Phenatoma (Cryptomella) crassispiralis Marwick, 1929(original combination)

Extinct species of gastropod

Tomopleura crassispiralis is an extinct species of sea snail, a marine gastropod mollusk in the family Borsoniidae.

== Distribution ==
This extinct marine species from the Upper Cenozoic was found in New Zealand; age range: 28.4 to 23.03 Ma
