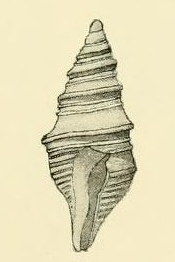
- Original image of a shell of Maoritomella albula

Scientific classification
- Kingdom: Animalia
- Phylum: Mollusca
- Class: Gastropoda
- Subclass: Caenogastropoda
- Order: Neogastropoda
- Superfamily: Conoidea
- Family: Borsoniidae
- Genus: Maoritomella
- Species: M. albula

Binomial name
- Maoritomella albula (Hutton, 1873)

Synonyms
- Pleurotoma albula Hutton, 1873 (original combination); Pleurotoma antipodum Smith, E.A., 1877; Tomopleura albula (Hutton, 1873); Tomopleura (Maoritomella) albula (Hutton, 1873)

= Maoritomella albula =

Species of gastropod

Maoritomella albula is a species of sea snail, a marine gastropod mollusk in the family Borsoniidae.

== Description ==
The height of the shell attains 9 mm, its width 3.7 mm. The smooth spire is acute The 7½ whorls are spirally grooved with the grooves finely transversely striated. There is also a central prominent spiral rib. The aperture is oblong. The siphonal canal is very short. The body whorl is as long as the spire. The color of the shell is ochraceous white. The apex and the columella are white. The angle of the spire is 30°.

== Distribution ==
This marine species occurs off Tasmania and New Zealand.
