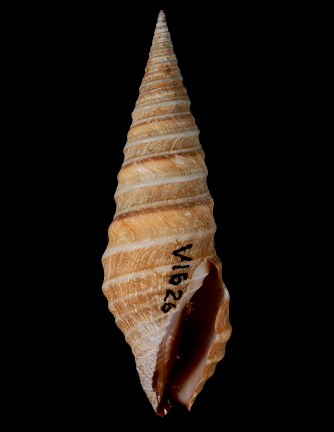
- Shell of Pulsarella fultoni

Scientific classification
- Kingdom: Animalia
- Phylum: Mollusca
- Class: Gastropoda
- Subclass: Caenogastropoda
- Order: Neogastropoda
- Superfamily: Conoidea
- Family: Borsoniidae
- Genus: Pulsarella
- Species: P. fultoni

Binomial name
- Pulsarella fultoni (G.B. Sowerby III, 1888)

Synonyms
- Drillia fultoni (G.B. Sowerby III, 1888); Pleurotoma fultoni G.B. Sowerby III, 1888 (original combination); Tomopleura fultoni (G.B. Sowerby III, 1888)

= Pulsarella fultoni =

Species of gastropod

Pulsarella fultoni, common name the humbug turrid, is a species of sea snail, a marine gastropod mollusk in the family Borsoniidae.

== Description ==
The length of the shell varies between 20 mm and 32 mm. The elongate shell has a sharp spire. It has a pale grey color with dark, longitudinal, irregularly scattered strigae, tinted on both sides in a dark color. The shell contains 11 whorls. The sutures are hardly impressed. The body whorl is slightly convex with 7 - 8 carinae. The small aperture is elongate-oval. The outer lip is deeply sinuated. The siphonal canal is very short.

== Distinguishing features ==
The shell is robust with a moderately elevated spire that tapers to a sharp point. The outer lip is thin, featuring a U-shaped anal sinus positioned just below the suture. The surface is adorned with widely spaced spiral cords: one below the apical suture, one at the periphery (aligned with the basal suture), and a third between them. Additionally, several finer cords decorate the base. The spaces between the cords are concave, giving the shell a hollowed appearance.

Fresh specimens range from orange-brown to dark brown, with contrasting white spiral cords. The inner lip and base are a deeper purplish-brown. In dead specimens, colors tend to fade.

== Distribution ==
This marine species is endemic to South Africa and occurs off False Bay, South Transkei and the Agulhas Bank at depths between 20 m and 85 m.
