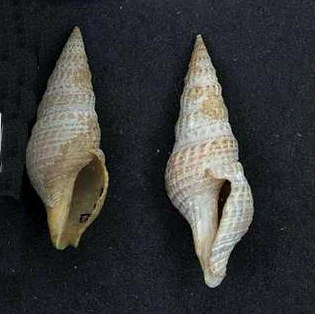
- Two shells of Phenatoma roseum (museum specimens at Naturalis Biodiversity Center)

Scientific classification
- Kingdom: Animalia
- Phylum: Mollusca
- Class: Gastropoda
- Subclass: Caenogastropoda
- Order: Neogastropoda
- Superfamily: Conoidea
- Family: Borsoniidae
- Genus: Phenatoma
- Species: P. roseum

Binomial name
- Phenatoma roseum (Quoy & Gaimard), 1833

Synonyms
- Phenatoma novaezelandiae (Reeve, 1843); Drillia novaezelandiae Reeve, 1843; Pleurotoma novaezelandiae Reeve, 1843; Pleurotoma plicatella F. W. Hutton, 1885; Pleurotoma rosea Quoy & Gaimard, 1833

= Phenatoma roseum =

Species of gastropod

Phenatoma roseum, or the pink tower shell, is a species of predatory sea snail, a marine gastropod mollusc in the family Borsoniidae.

== Description ==
The size of an adult shell varies between 23 mm and 34 mm; its width is 11 mm. The shell is spirally sulcate and longitudinally striate. The suture is slightly impressed, marginate and subcrenulate. The sinus is rather broad and shallow. It has a rose-ash color, purple-rose within the aperture.

== Distribution ==
This species is endemic to New Zealand and Tasmania.
