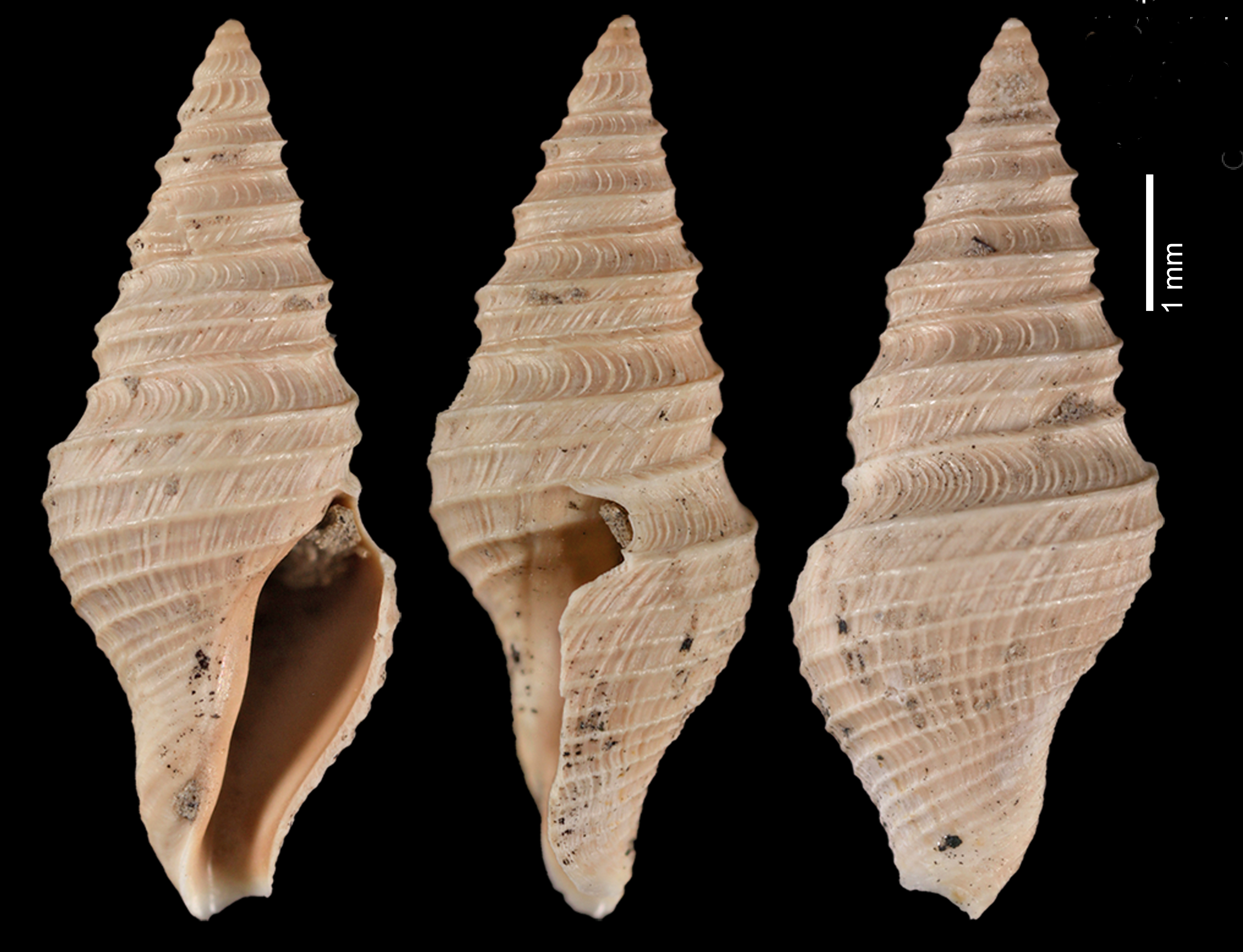
- Shell of † Microdrillia aturensis (holotype in MNHN, Paris)

Scientific classification
- Kingdom: Animalia
- Phylum: Mollusca
- Class: Gastropoda
- Subclass: Caenogastropoda
- Order: Neogastropoda
- Superfamily: Conoidea
- Family: Borsoniidae
- Genus: Microdrillia; Casey, 1903

Type species
- † Oligotoma meyeri Cossmann, 1889

Synonyms
- Acrobela Thiele, 1925 (Invalid: junior homonym of Acrobela Foerster, 1862 (Hymenoptera); Acropota is a replacement name); Acropota F. Nordsieck, 1977

= Microdrillia =

Genus of gastropods

Microdrillia is a genus of very small sea snails, marine gastropod mollusks in the family Borsoniidae.

== Description ==
The species in this genus are characterized by a well-developed, multispiral, closely coiled protoconch. One to three of its basal whorls are costulate. The body whorl is wholly devoid of costae but spirally carinate. The retral sinus is relatively large, circularly rounded and close to the suture. The aperture is oblique. The columella is callous, with or without plications. The siphonal canal is short or subobsolete.

The following species of this genus are also found as fossils in the age range of 48.6 Ma to 0.781 Ma: Microdrillia comatotropis, Microdrillia cossmanni, Microdrillia crispata, Microdrillia harrisi, Microdrillia ouchitae, Microdrillia propetrina, Microdrillia tersa, Microdrillia trina

== Distribution ==
This marine genus occurs in the Gulf of Oman, off South Africa and off Australia (New South Wales, Queensland).

== Species ==
- † Microdrillia aturensis Lozouet, 2017
- Microdrillia circumvertens (Melvill & Standen, 1901)
- Microdrillia commentica (Hedley, 1915)
- Microdrillia dinos Kilburn, 1986
- Microdrillia fastosa (Hedley, 1907)
- † Microdrillia meyeri (Cossmann, 1889)
- Microdrillia niponica (E. A. Smith, 1879)
- Microdrillia optima (Thiele, 1925)
- † Microdrillia pakaurangia Powell, 1942
- Microdrillia patricia (Melvill, 1904)
- Microdrillia pertinax (Hedley, 1922)
- Microdrillia rhomboidales Stahlschmidt, Poppe & Tagaro, 2018
- Microdrillia sagamiensis Kuroda & Oyama, 1971
- Microdrillia sansibarica (Thiele, 1925)
- † Microdrillia serratula (Bellardi, 1877)
- Microdrillia stephensensis Laseron, 1954
- Microdrillia taiyokono Poppe & Tagaro, 2026
- † Microdrillia teretiaeformis A.W. Janssen, 1972
- Microdrillia trina Mansfield, 1925
- Microdrillia triporcata (E. A. Smith, 1879)

Species brought into synonymy

- Microdrillia crispata (Cristofori & Jan, 1832): synonym of Drilliola crispata (De Cristofori & Jan, 1832)
- Microdrillia difficilis (E. A. Smith, 1879): synonym of Drilliola difficilis (E. A. Smith, 1879)
- Microdrillia loprestiana (Calcara, 1841): synonym of Drilliola loprestiana (Calcara, 1841)
- Microdrillia pruina (Watson, 1881): synonym of Retidrillia pruina (Watson, 1881)
- Microdrillia zeuxippe (Dall, 1919): synonym of Drilliola zeuxippe (Dall, 1919)
