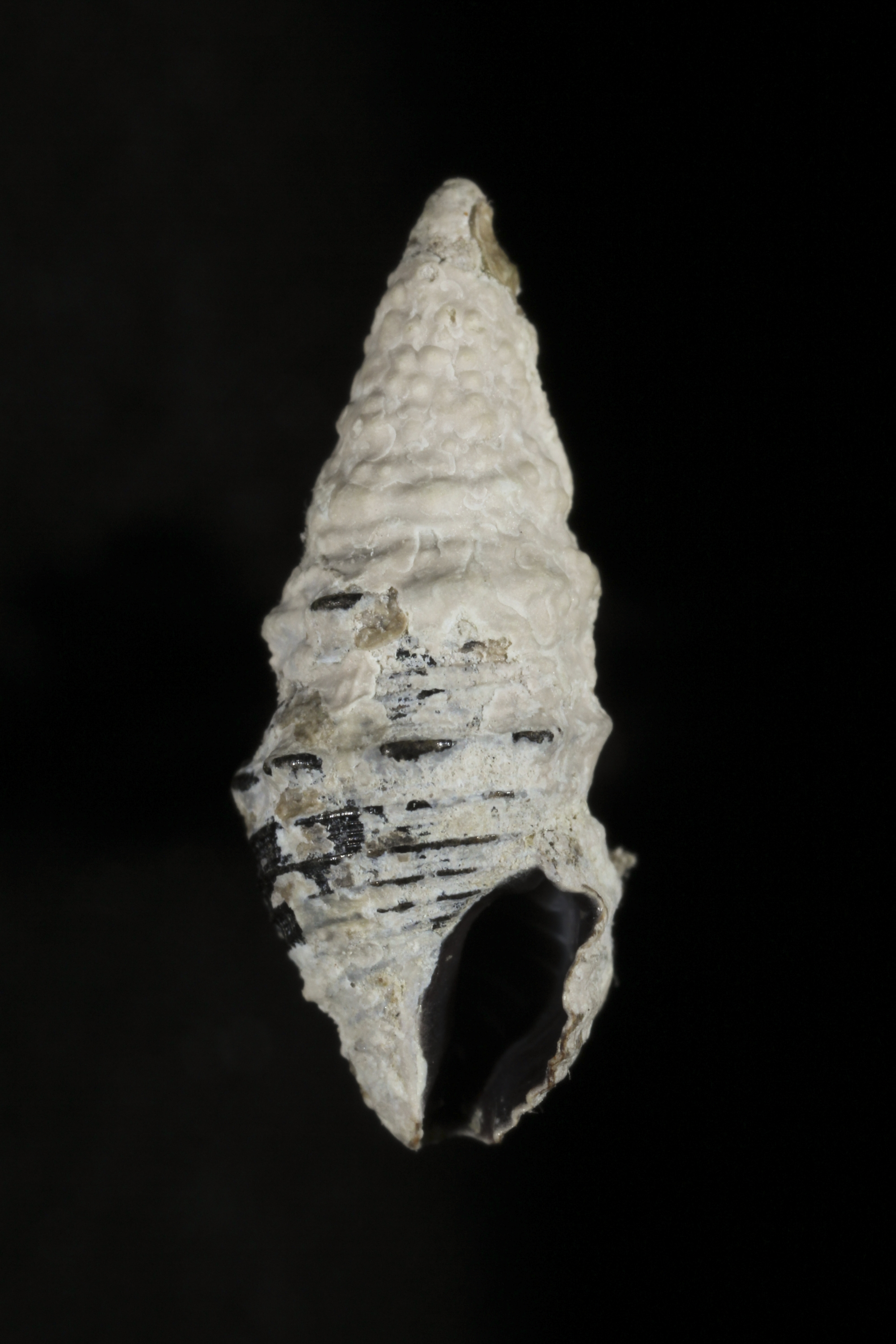
- shell of Turridrupa albofasciata (specimen at MNHN, Paris)

Scientific classification
- Kingdom: Animalia
- Phylum: Mollusca
- Class: Gastropoda
- Subclass: Caenogastropoda
- Order: Neogastropoda
- Superfamily: Conoidea
- Family: Turridae
- Genus: Turridrupa; Hedley, 1922

Type species
- Pleurotoma acutigemmata Smith E. A., 1877

= Turridrupa =

Genus of gastropods

Turridrupa is a genus of sea snails, marine gastropod mollusks in the family Turridae, the turrids.

== Description ==
(Original description) The solid shell has a cylindro-fusiform. Its colour is usually monochrome, sometimes brown orange or yellow. The protoconch consists of two smooth turbinate whorls, followed by a whorl ornamented with close arcuate riblets. The adult sculpture consists of numerous revolving keels, one or more of which may break up into bead rows. The fasciole (= spiral band on the edgse of a canal formed by successive growth lines) is indefinite. The siphonal notch has a short subcircular incision with a raised margin. The aperture shows revolving ridges on the palate.

== Distribution ==
This marine species occurs in the Indo-Pacific and off Australia.

== Species ==
Species within the genus Turridrupa include:

- Turridrupa acutigemmata (E.A. Smith, 1877)
- †Turridrupa akhaiderensis (Abbass H., 1977)
- † Turridrupa albinoides (K. Martin, 1883)
- Turridrupa albocastanea (Stahlschmidt, Puillandre, B.M. Olivera & Kantor, 2025)
- Turridrupa albofasciata (Smith E. A., 1877)
- Turridrupa albogemmata (Stahlschmidt & Fraussen, 2011)
- Turridrupa armillata (Reeve, 1845)
- Turridrupa astricta (Reeve, 1843)
- Turridrupa aureoresina (Stahlschmidt, Puillandre, B.M. Olivera & Kantor, 2025)
- Turridrupa bijubata (Reeve, 1843)
- Turridrupa chinoi (Stahlschmidt, Puillandre, B.M. Olivera & Kantor, 2025)
- Turridrupa cincta (Lamarck, 1822)
- Turridrupa consobrina (Powell, 1967)
- Turridrupa deceptrix (Hedley, 1922)
- Turridrupa decorata (Stahlschmidt, Puillandre, B.M. Olivera & Kantor, 2025)
- Turridrupa diffusa (Powell, 1967)
- Turridrupa elongata (Watkins, 2010)
- Turridrupa erythraea (Weinkauff, 1875)
- Turridrupa fedosovi (Stahlschmidt, Puillandre, B.M. Olivera & Kantor, 2025)
- Turridrupa gatchensis (Hervier, 1896)
- Turridrupa gourgueti (Stahlschmidt, Puillandre, B.M. Olivera & Kantor, 2025)
- Turridrupa granulata (Stahlschmidt, Puillandre, B.M. Olivera & Kantor, 2025)
- Turridrupa imitiata (Stahlschmidt, Puillandre, B.M. Olivera & Kantor, 2025)
- Turridrupa jubata (Reeve, 1843)
- Turridrupa maestratii (Stahlschmidt, Puillandre, B.M. Olivera & Kantor, 2025)
- Turridrupa magnifica (Stahlschmidt, Puillandre, B.M. Olivera & Kantor, 2025)
- Turridrupa neojubata (Stahlschmidt, Puillandre, B.M. Olivera & Kantor, 2025)
- Turridrupa pallurae T. Cossignani, 2023
- Turridrupa polynesia (Stahlschmidt, Puillandre, B.M. Olivera & Kantor, 2025)
- Turridrupa poppei (Stahlschmidt & Fraussen, 2011)
- Turridrupa punctolineata (Stahlschmidt, Puillandre, B.M. Olivera & Kantor, 2025)
- Turridrupa virginiae (Stahlschmidt, Puillandre, B.M. Olivera & Kantor, 2025)
- Turridrupa weaveri (Powell, 1967)
- † Turridrupa witkampi Beets, 1983

Species brought into synonymy

- Turridrupa barkliensis H. Adams, 1869: synonym of Drillia barkliensis (H. Adams, 1869)
- Turridrupa cerithina (Anton, 1838): synonym of Crassispira cerithina (Anton, 1838)
- Turridrupa fastosa (Hedley, 1907): synonym of Microdrillia fastosa (Hedley, 1907)
- † Turridrupa kagoshimaensis Shuto, 1965: synonym of † Otitoma kagoshimaensis (Shuto, 1965) (original combination)
- † Turridrupa mangaoparia Beu, 1970: synonym of † Drilliola mangaoparia (Beu, 1970)
- † Turridrupa maoria Powell, 1942 : synonym of † Drilliola maoria (Powell, 1942)
- Turridrupa nagasakiensis (Smith E. A., 1879): synonym of Inquisitor nagasakiensis (E. A. Smith, 1879) (> superseded combination)
- Turridrupa pertinax Hedley, 1922: synonym of Microdrillia pertinax (Hedley, 1922) (original combination)
- Turridrupa prestoni (Powell, 1967): synonym of Turridrupa jubata (Reeve, 1843) (junior subjective synonym)
