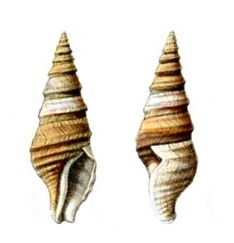
- Two shells of Suavodrillia declivis

Scientific classification
- Kingdom: Animalia
- Phylum: Mollusca
- Class: Gastropoda
- Subclass: Caenogastropoda
- Order: Neogastropoda
- Superfamily: Conoidea
- Family: Borsoniidae
- Genus: Suavodrillia; Dall, 1918

Type species
- Drillia kennicotti Dall, 1871

= Suavodrillia =

Genus of gastropods

Suavodrillia is a genus of sea snails, marine gastropod mollusks in the family Borsoniidae.

== Species ==
Species within the genus Suavodrillia include:

- Suavodrillia declivis (Martens, 1880)
- Suavodrillia kennicotti (Dall, 1871)
- Suavodrillia textilia Dall, 1927

Species brought into synonymy

- Suavodrillia (Typhlomangelia) G.O. Sars, 1878 : synonym of Typhlomangelia G.O. Sars, 1878
- † Suavodrillia bicarinata Ozaki, 1958: synonym of † Abyssotrophon crystallinus (Kuroda, 1953)
- Suavodrillia sagamiana Dall, 1925: synonym of Bathytoma engonia (Watson, 1881)
- Suavodrillia tanneri (Verrill & Smith, 1884): synonym of Drilliola pruina, synonym of Retidrillia pruina (Watson, 1881)
- Suavodrillia willetti Dall, 1919: synonym of Retidrillia willetti (Dall, 1919)
