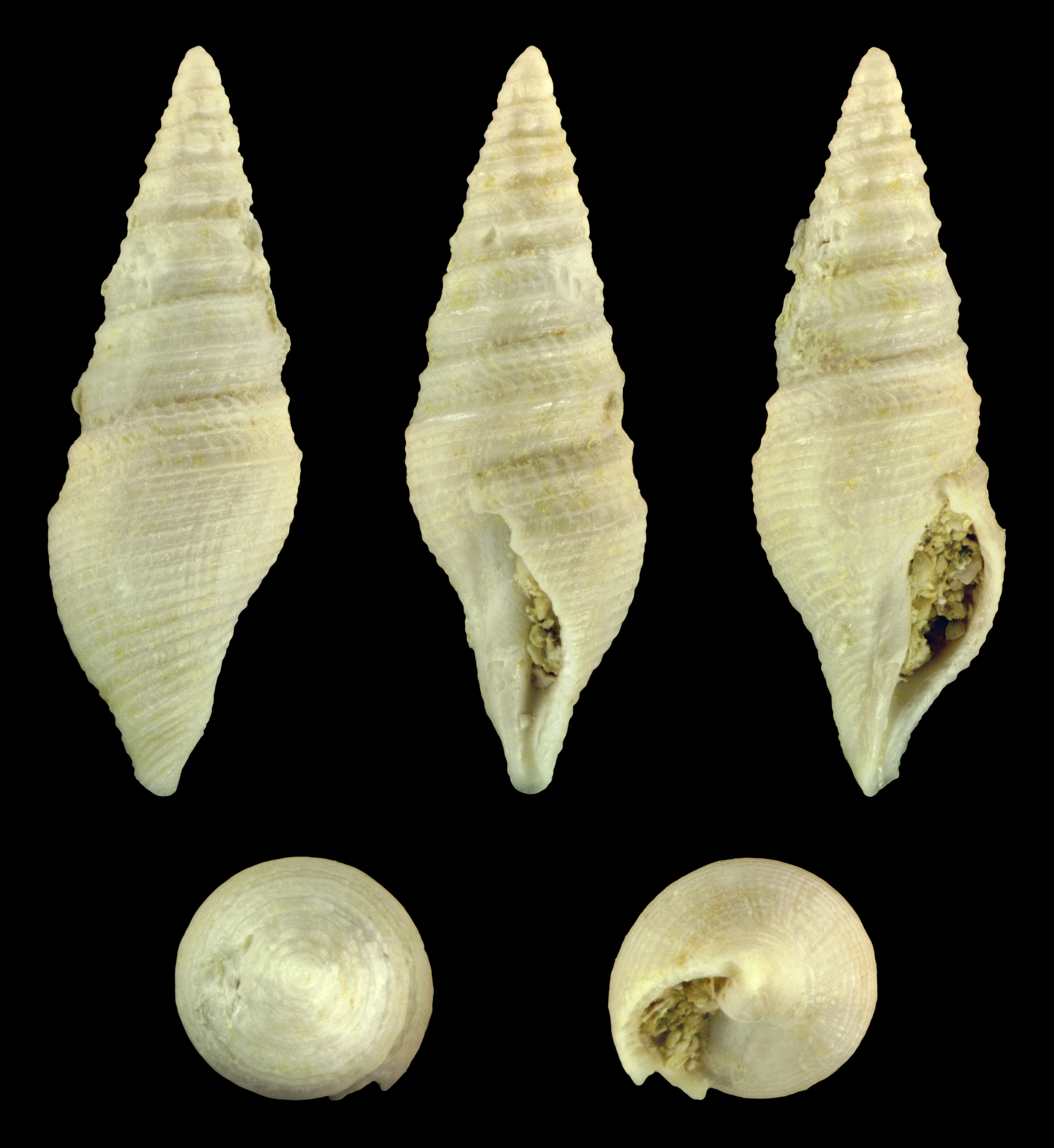
- Shell of the fossil species Drilliola turrella

Scientific classification
- Kingdom: Animalia
- Phylum: Mollusca
- Class: Gastropoda
- Subclass: Caenogastropoda
- Order: Neogastropoda
- Superfamily: Conoidea
- Family: Borsoniidae
- Genus: Drilliola; Locard, 1897

Type species
- Taranis emendata Monterosato, 1872

Species
- See text

Synonyms
- Asthenotoma (Drilliola) Locard, 1897; Microdrillia Casey, 1903; † Pleurotoma (Drilliola) Locard, 1897 (original rank)

= Drilliola =

Genus of gastropods

Drilliola is a genus of sea snails, marine gastropod mollusks in the family Borsoniidae, the cone snails and their allies.

== Species ==
Species within the genus Drilliola include:

- † Drilliola annosa (Powell, 1942)
- Drilliola antarctica Kantor, Harasewych & Puillandre, 2016
- Drilliola barnsi Poppe & Tagaro, 2021
- † Drilliola basteroti (Des Moulins, 1842)
- † Drilliola consobrina (Peyrot, 1931)
- Drilliola crispata (De Cristofori & Jan, 1832)
- Drilliola difficilis (E. A. Smith, 1879)
- † Drilliola elegantula de Boury, 1899
- Drilliola emendata (Monterosato, 1872)
- † Drilliola estotiensis Lozouet, 2017
- Drilliola exquisita Poppe & Tagaro, 2021
- Drilliola labradorae Poppe & Tagaro, 2021
- Drilliola loprestiana (Calcara, 1841)
- Drilliola mactanensis Poppe & Tagaro, 2021
- † Drilliola mammicula Lozouet, 2017
- † Drilliola mangaoparia (Beu,1970)
- † Drilliola maoria (Powell, 1942)
- Drilliola multispiralis Poppe & Tagaro, 2021
- † Drilliola obesa (Peyrot, 1931)
- † Drilliola ponticensis Lozouet, 2017
- † Drilliola pseudospirata (d'Orbigny, 1850)
- † Drilliola pukeuriensis (Powell, 1942)
- Drilliola reevii (C. B. Adams, 1850)
- † Drilliola rupta Marwick, 1931
- † Drilliola sedentaria Lozouet, 1999
- † Drilliola sola (Powell, 1942)
- † Drilliola speyeri (Kock & Wiechmann, 1872)
- † Drilliola subsedentaria Lozouet, 2017
- † Drilliola subturrella (de Boury, 1899)
- † Drilliola terranigra Lozouet, 2015
- Drilliola tersa (Woodring, 1928)
- Drilliola trina (Mansfield, 1925)
- † Drilliola turrella (Lamarck, 1804)
- Drilliola zeuxippe (Dall, 1919)

Species brought into synonymy

- Drilliola comatotropis (Dall, 1881): synonym of Drilliola loprestiana (Calcara, 1841)
- Drilliola megalacma (Sykes, 1906): synonym of Retidrillia megalacme (Sykes, 1906)
- Drilliola pruina (Watson, 1881): synonym of Retidrillia pruina (Watson, 1881)
- Drilliola pulchella (Verrill, 1880) : synonym of Drilliola lopprestiana Calcara, 1841
