= Turridrupa chinoi =

Scientific classification
- Kingdom: Animalia
- Phylum: Mollusca
- Class: Gastropoda
- Subclass: Caenogastropoda
- Order: Neogastropoda
- Family: Turridae
- Genus: Turridrupa
- Species: T. chinoi

Binomial name
- Turridrupa chinoi Stahlschmidt, Pauillandre, B.M. Ovivera & Kantor, 2025.

Species of gastropod

Turridrupa chinoi is a species of sea snail, a marine gastropod mollusc in the family Turridae, the turrids.

== Etymology ==
Named in honor of Mitsou Chino for his contributions to conchology and aid in identifying this specific species.

== Description ==
T. Chinoi is small for its genus, with a spire reaching 10.8 mm in height made up of about 7 teleoconch whorls. It is similar to T. diffusa, only smaller, slenderer, with weaker cords, denser gemmules, and different coloration. It has a pale brown background color with slightly darker subsutural region.

== Distribution ==
T. chinoi has been found in the Philippines and Vanuatu at a depth of 30 to 100 m.
