= Turridrupa astricta =

Scientific classification
- Kingdom: Animalia
- Phylum: Mollusca
- Class: Gastropoda
- Subclass: Caenogastropoda
- Order: Neogastropoda
- Superfamily: Conoidea
- Family: Turridae
- Genus: Turridrupa
- Species: T. astricta

Binomial name
- Turridrupa astricta (Reeve, 1843)

Synonyms
- Pleurotoma astricta Reeve, 1843

Species of gastropod

Turridrupa astricta, common name the laced pleurotoma, is a species of sea snail, a marine gastropod mollusk in the family Turridae, the turrids.

The subspecies Turridrupa astricta consobrina Powell, 1967 is a synonym of Turridrupa consobrina Powell, 1967 (original rank)

== Description ==
The length of the shell attains 13.5 mm.

(Original description) The shell is cylindrically oblong and spirally grooved. The whorls are convex, pale yellow and tricarinated. The keels are almost obsolete, the middle keel delicately laced with an articulated chain of white and reddish brown. The siphonal canal and the aperture are short.

The sinus apex is at the end of the peripheral cord, which is maculated with white and brown dashes.

== Distribution ==
This marine species occurs off the Philippines, the Marshall Islands, Mariana Islands and Cook Islands; off New Caledonia and Queensland, Australia.
