= Microdrillia sansibarica =

Scientific classification
- Kingdom: Animalia
- Phylum: Mollusca
- Class: Gastropoda
- Subclass: Caenogastropoda
- Order: Neogastropoda
- Superfamily: Conoidea
- Family: Borsoniidae
- Genus: Microdrillia
- Species: M. sansibarica

Binomial name
- Microdrillia sansibarica (Thiele, 1925)

Synonyms
- Bela sansibarica Thiele, 1925 (original combination)

Species of gastropod

Microdrillia sansibarica is a species of sea snail, a marine gastropod mollusk in the family Borsoniidae.

According to Kilburn this species may be a synonym of Microdrillia patricia, but appears to have a more produced base and to lack a basal cord on early whorls.

According to Tucker (2004), Bela (Acrobela) sansibarica Thiele, J., 1925 is a synonym of Bela chuni Thiele, 1925.

== Distribution ==
This marine species occurs in the Zanzibar Channel.
