= Turridrupa aureoresina =

Scientific classification
- Kingdom: Animalia
- Phylum: Mollusca
- Class: Gastropoda
- Subclass: Caenogastropoda
- Order: Neogastropoda
- Family: Turridae
- Genus: Turridrupa
- Species: T. aureoresina

Binomial name
- Turridrupa aureoresina Stahlschmidt, Pauillandre, B.M. Ovivera & Kantor, 2025.

Species of gastropod

Turridrupa aureoresina is a species of sea snail, a marine gastropod mollusc in the family Turridae, the turrids.

== Description ==
Turridrupa aureoresina is small for its genus. Its shell reaches up to 14.5 mm, narrowly claviform, and with 7-8 whorls in its spire. It resembles T. deceptrix but has slightly stronger spiral cords with well-developed gemmules. Its protoconch is and first few whorls are off-white to pale brown. It then transitions into dark reddish brown with paler colored spiral cords.

== Distribution ==
Turridrupa aureoresina has been found in the Philippines and Japan at depths of 20 to 40 m.
