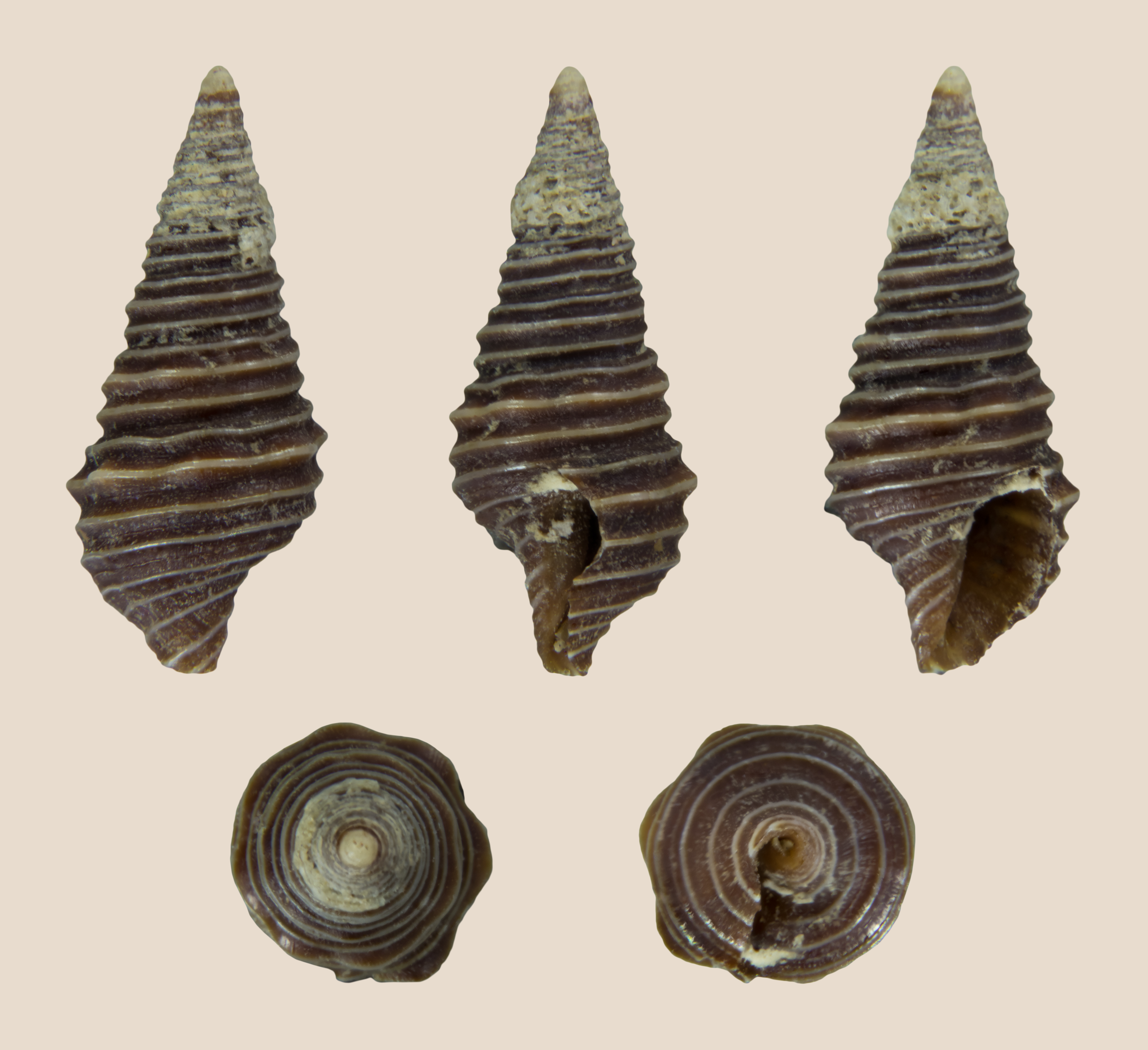
- A shell of Turridrupa bijubata

Scientific classification
- Kingdom: Animalia
- Phylum: Mollusca
- Class: Gastropoda
- Subclass: Caenogastropoda
- Order: Neogastropoda
- Family: Turridae
- Genus: Turridrupa
- Species: T. bijubata

Binomial name
- Turridrupa bijubata (Reeve, 1843)

Synonyms
- Drillia bijubata (Reeve, 1843); Pleurotoma bijubata Reeve, 1843 (basionym); Surcula bijubata (Reeve, 1843); Surcula bijubata nodulosa Bouge, L.J. & Dautzenberg, P.L. 1914; Turricula bijubata (Reeve, 1843)

= Turridrupa bijubata =

Species of gastropod

Turridrupa bijubata, common name the crested turrid, is a species of sea snail, a marine gastropod mollusk in the family Turridae.

== Description ==
The size of an adult shell varies between 11 mm and 25 mm. The color of the shell is chocolate-brown, encircled by narrow, lighter-colored keels The second keel, which is somewhat stronger than the others, is often broken up into small tubercles. The interior of the aperture is chocolate-colored. The siphonal canal is short. It is distinguished from Turridrupa cincta (Lamarck, 1822) by its narrower form, a longer spire, sharper ridges and a darker color.

The sinus apex is situated at end of the mid-shoulder cord. The cords are smooth with a buff color on dark brown ground.

== Distribution ==
This marine species has a wide distribution : off Mozambique, Madagascar to Japan, the Fiji Islands and Australia. (Queensland)
