= Turridrupa maestratii =

Scientific classification
- Kingdom: Animalia
- Phylum: Mollusca
- Class: Gastropoda
- Subclass: Caenogastropoda
- Order: Neogastropoda
- Family: Turridae
- Genus: Turridrupa
- Species: T. maestratii

Binomial name
- Turridrupa maestratii Stahlschmidt, Pauillandre, B.M. Ovivera & Kantor, 2025.

Species of gastropod

Turridrupa maestratii is a species of sea snail, a marine gastropod mollusc in the family Turridae, the turrids.

== Etymology ==
Turridrupa maestratii is named after Philippe Maestrati, in honor of his contributions to malacology.

== Description ==
Turridrupa maestratii is very similar to T. acutigemmata in appearance. The main difference is that T. maestratii has a "paucispiral protoconch (while T. acutigemmata has a multispiral protoconch), by the slightly slenderer shape, and by the undulating spiral cords (while the spiral cords other than the sinus cord are smooth in T. acutigemmata)."

== Distribution ==
Turridrupa maestratii has only been found the Grand Passage region of New Caledonia, in depths between 220 and 370 m.
