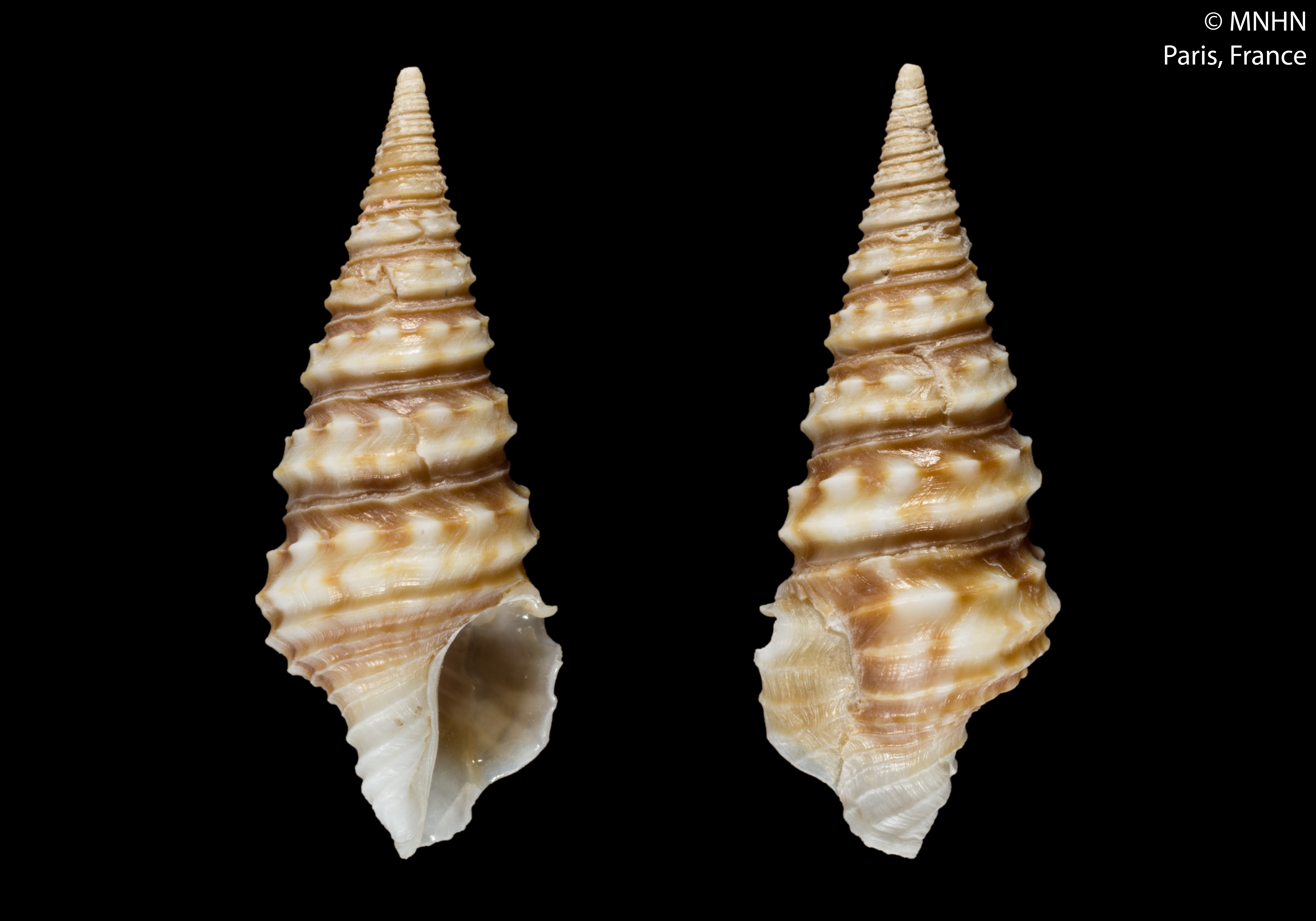
- Shell of Turridrupa albogemmata (holotype at MNHN, Paris)

Scientific classification
- Kingdom: Animalia
- Phylum: Mollusca
- Class: Gastropoda
- Subclass: Caenogastropoda
- Order: Neogastropoda
- Superfamily: Conoidea
- Family: Turridae
- Genus: Turridrupa
- Species: T. albogemmata

Binomial name
- Turridrupa albogemmata Stahlschmidt & Fraussen, 2011

= Turridrupa albogemmata =

Species of gastropod

Turridrupa albogemmata is a species of sea snail, a marine gastropod mollusk in the family Turridae, the turrids.

== Description ==
T. albogemmata is very similar to T. acutigemmata in shape, although broader and with a more elevated second spiral cord. Its shell can reach up to 22.1 mm. with about eight whorls and a spire about twice the height of its aperture. Its colorations is "light brown with cream and brown shadings, subsutural region being darker and the gemmules of the sinus spiral cord being creamy white; last whorl with diffuse cream coloured maculation, the base and siphonal canal are creamy white."

== Distribution ==
This marine species occurs off Mactan Island, Philippines.
