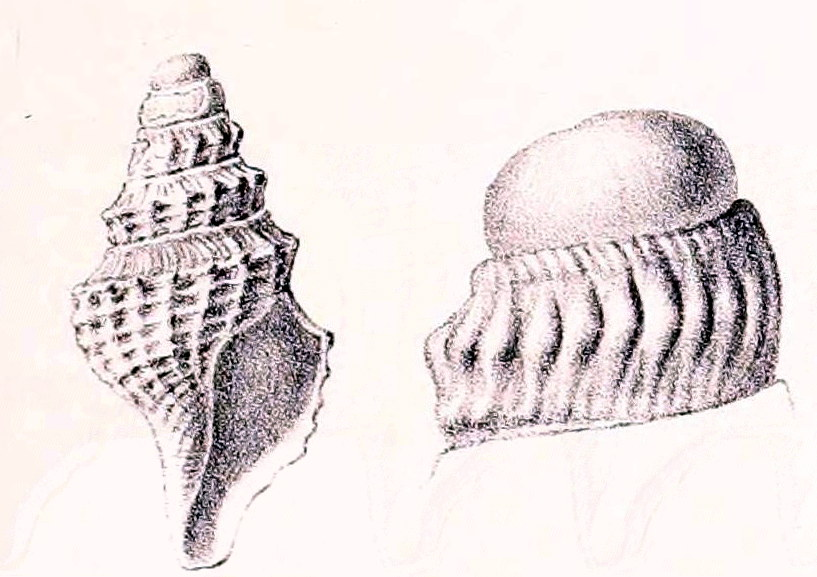
- Retidrillia megalacme

Scientific classification
- Kingdom: Animalia
- Phylum: Mollusca
- Class: Gastropoda
- Subclass: Caenogastropoda
- Order: Neogastropoda
- Superfamily: Conoidea
- Family: Borsoniidae
- Genus: Retidrillia; McLean, 2000

Type species
- Suavodrillia willetti Dall, 1919

= Retidrillia =

Genus of gastropods

Retidrillia is a genus of sea snails, marine gastropod mollusks in the family Borsoniidae.

== Species ==
Species within the genus Retidrillia include:

- Retidrillia megalacme (Sykes, 1906)
- Retidrillia pruina (Watson, 1881)
- Retidrillia willetti (Dall, 1919)
