= Microdrillia optima =

Scientific classification
- Kingdom: Animalia
- Phylum: Mollusca
- Class: Gastropoda
- Subclass: Caenogastropoda
- Order: Neogastropoda
- Superfamily: Conoidea
- Family: Borsoniidae
- Genus: Microdrillia
- Species: M. optima

Binomial name
- Microdrillia optima (Thiele, 1925)

Synonyms
- Bela optima Thiele, 1925 (original combination)

Species of gastropod

Microdrillia optima is a species of sea snail, a marine gastropod mollusk in the family Borsoniidae.

== Distribution ==
This marine species occurs in the Zanzibar Channel.
