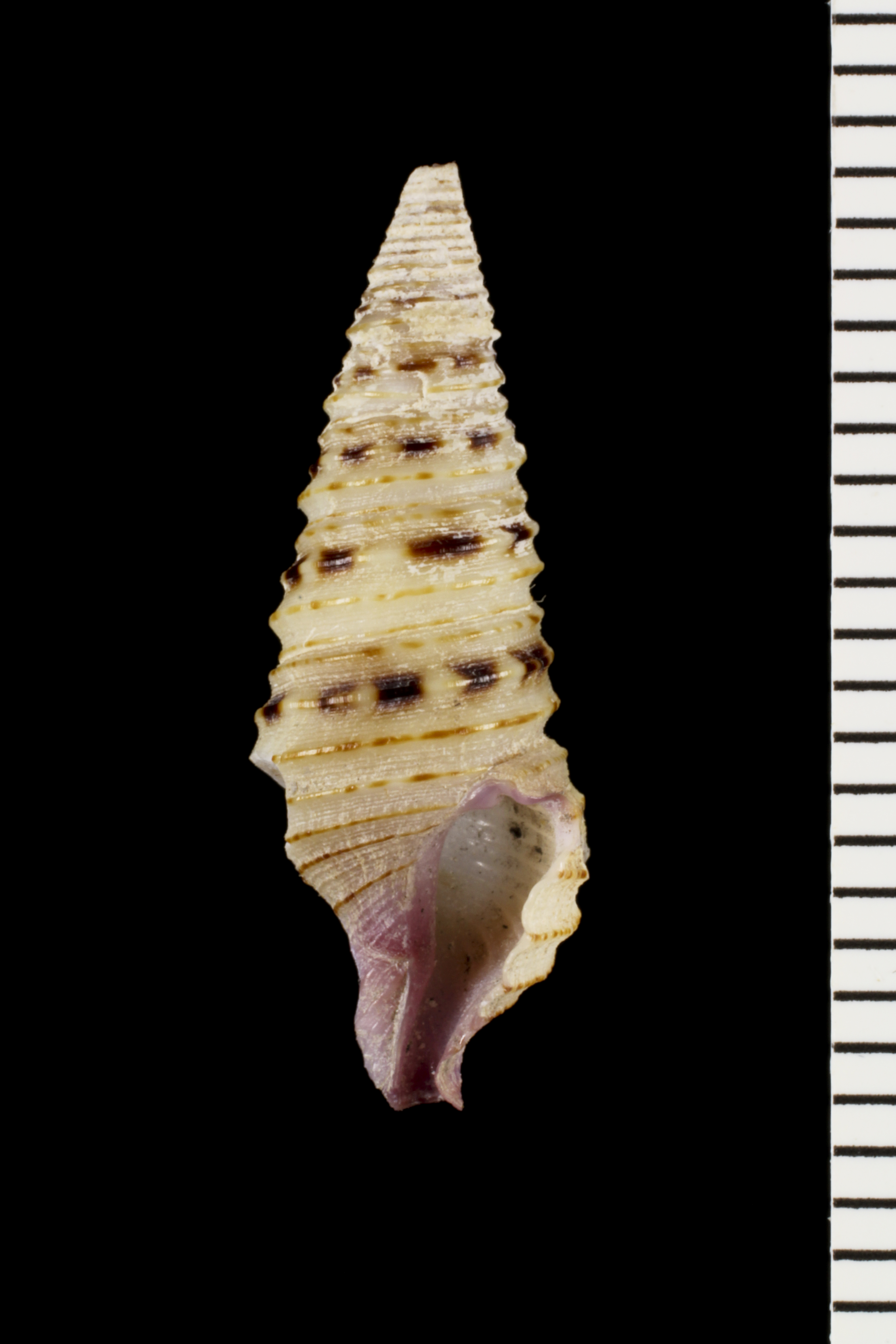
- Shell of Turridrupa erythraea (specimen at MNHN, Paris)

Scientific classification
- Kingdom: Animalia
- Phylum: Mollusca
- Class: Gastropoda
- Subclass: Caenogastropoda
- Order: Neogastropoda
- Family: Turridae
- Genus: Turridrupa
- Species: T. erythraea

Binomial name
- Turridrupa erythraea (Weinkauff, 1875)

Synonyms
- Pleurotoma erythraea Weinkauff, 1875 (original combination); Turridrupa cingulifera erythraea H.C. Weinkauff, 1875; Xenuroturris cingulifera erythraea H.C. Weinkauff, 1875

= Turridrupa erythraea =

Species of gastropod

Turridrupa erythraea is a species of sea snail, a marine gastropod mollusk in the family Turridae, the turrids.

== Description ==
The shell of Turridrupa erythraea attains a length of approximately 40 mm.

(Original description in German) This nearly spindle-shaped shell is solid, whitish with a violet base, and encircled by spiral ridges. Fine, raised lines are visible between the ridges under magnification. The ridges are irregularly speckled with reddish-brown dots, except for the second ridge from the apex, which is marked with regularly articulated blackish-brown spots. The spire is elevated-conical, with a blunt, smooth, horn-colored apex. The shell comprises nine flat whorls. The penultimate whorl features three prominent and one less distinct ridge at the suture, which runs slightly obliquely. The body whorl is convex, bearing fifteen distinct ridges with a short siphonal canal, and is narrowed at the base. The aperture is vertical, bean-shaped, and violet within. The outer lip is simple, slightly jagged, and the incision is straight and shallow, falling on the second ridge.

== Distribution ==
This species occurs in the Red Sea off Egypt and Saudi Arabia.
