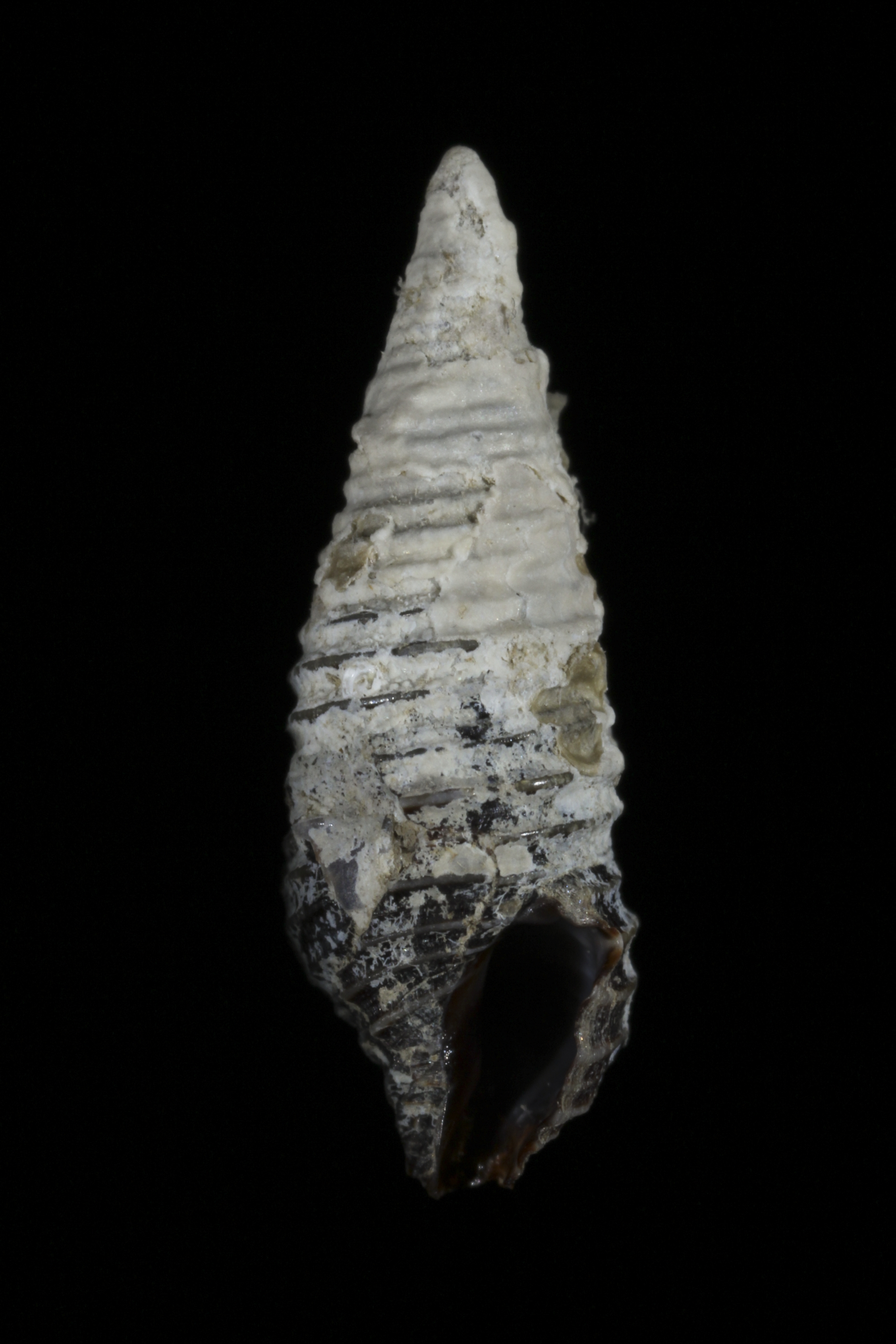
- Shell of Turridrupa elongata (specimen at MNHN, Paris)

Scientific classification
- Kingdom: Animalia
- Phylum: Mollusca
- Class: Gastropoda
- Subclass: Caenogastropoda
- Order: Neogastropoda
- Family: Turridae
- Genus: Turridrupa
- Species: T. elongata

Binomial name
- Turridrupa elongata Watkins 2010

= Turridrupa elongata =

Species of gastropod

Turridrupa elongata is a species of sea snail, a marine gastropod mollusk in the family Turridae, the turrids.

== Distribution ==
This marine species occurs off the Philippines and Papua New Guinea.
