= Microdrillia pakaurangia =

Scientific classification
- Kingdom: Animalia
- Phylum: Mollusca
- Class: Gastropoda
- Subclass: Caenogastropoda
- Order: Neogastropoda
- Superfamily: Conoidea
- Family: Borsoniidae
- Genus: Microdrillia
- Species: M. pakaurangia

Binomial name
- Microdrillia pakaurangia Powell, 1942

Extinct species of gastropod

Microdrillia pakaurangia is an extinct species of sea snail, a marine gastropod mollusk in the family Borsoniidae.

== Distribution ==
This extinct marine species is endemic to New Zealand, found at Pakaurangi Point, Kaipara
