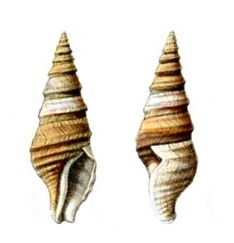
- Original image of two shells of Suavodrillia declivis

Scientific classification
- Kingdom: Animalia
- Phylum: Mollusca
- Class: Gastropoda
- Subclass: Caenogastropoda
- Order: Neogastropoda
- Superfamily: Conoidea
- Family: Borsoniidae
- Genus: Suavodrillia
- Species: S. declivis

Binomial name
- Suavodrillia declivis (Martens, 1880)

Synonyms
- Asthenotoma (Suavodrillia) declivis (Martens, 1880); Moniliopsis (Suavodrillia) declivis (Martens, 1880); Pleurotoma declivis Martens, 1880

= Suavodrillia declivis =

Species of gastropod

Suavodrillia declivis is a species of sea snail, a marine gastropod mollusk in the family Borsoniidae.

== Description ==
The shell is multicarinate with a few, strong carinae. The siphonal canal is somewhat more produced and narrowed. The anal sinus is shallow. The columella is not plicate. The color of the shell is light reddish fulvous.

== Distribution ==
This species occurs in the Pacific Ocean off Japan.
