= Turridrupa weaveri =

Scientific classification
- Kingdom: Animalia
- Phylum: Mollusca
- Class: Gastropoda
- Subclass: Caenogastropoda
- Order: Neogastropoda
- Family: Turridae
- Genus: Turridrupa
- Species: T. weaveri

Binomial name
- Turridrupa weaveri Powell, 1967

Species of gastropod

Turridrupa weaveri is a species of sea snail, a marine gastropod mollusk in the family Turridae, the turrids.

== Description ==
The length of the shell attains 22 mm.

== Distribution ==
This marine species occurs off Hawaii and the Philippines.
