= Suavodrillia textilia =

Scientific classification
- Kingdom: Animalia
- Phylum: Mollusca
- Class: Gastropoda
- Subclass: Caenogastropoda
- Order: Neogastropoda
- Superfamily: Conoidea
- Family: Borsoniidae
- Genus: Suavodrillia
- Species: S. textilia

Binomial name
- Suavodrillia textilia Dall, 1927

Species of gastropod

Suavodrillia textilia is a species of sea snail, a marine gastropod mollusk in the Suavodrillia family Borsoniidae.

== Description ==
The Suavodrillia textilia is a Neogastropoda cone shell that grows to a length of 8mm.

== Distribution ==
This species is found in the Western Atlantic, in the Atlantic Ocean from Georgia to Florida at depths between 538 - 805 m.

== Reproduction ==
Members of the order Neogastropoda are mostly gonochoric and broadcast spawners. Life cycle: Embryos develop into planktonic trochophore larvae and later into juvenile veligers before becoming fully grown adults.
