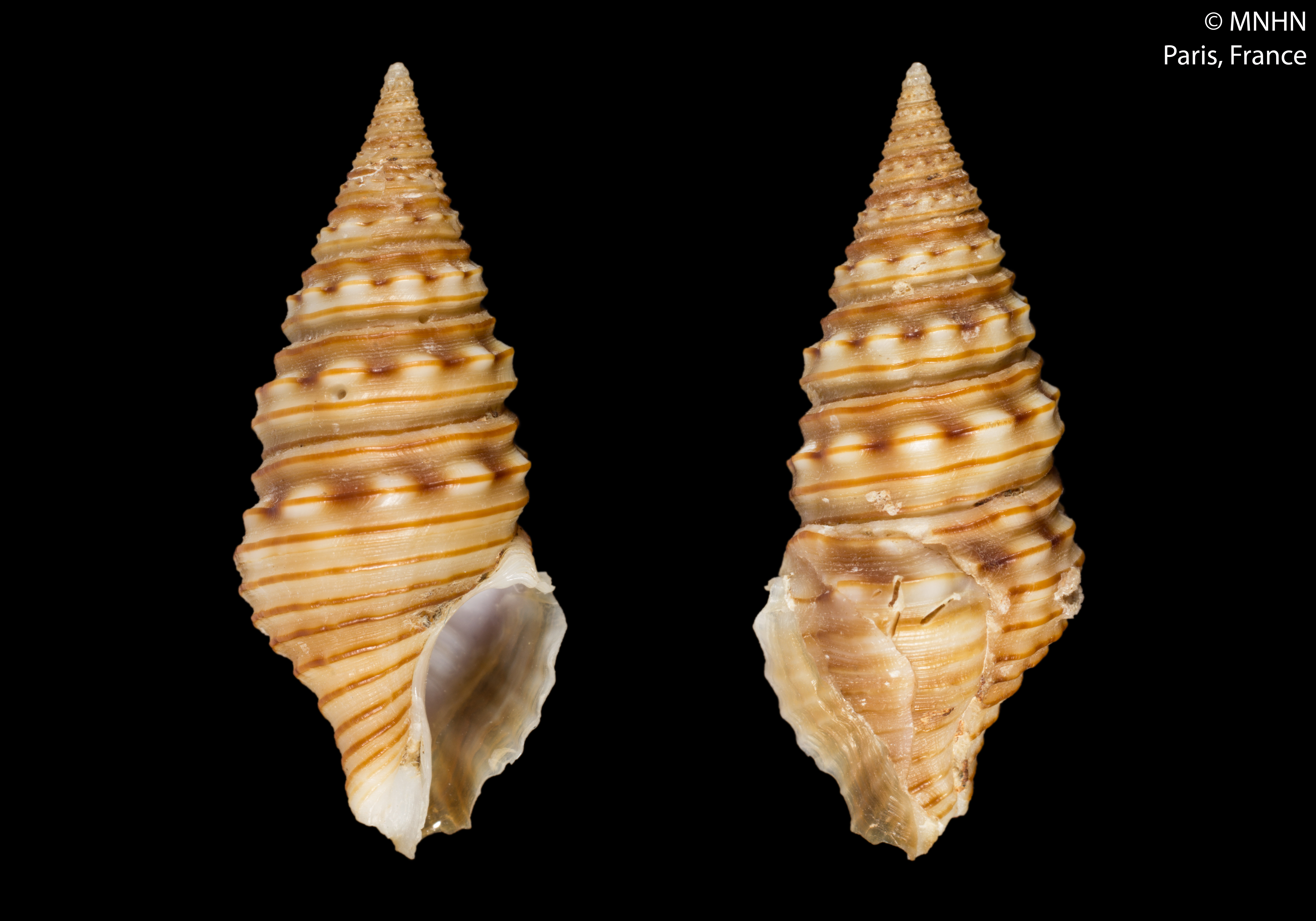
- Shell of Turridrupa poppei (holotype at MNHN, Paris)

Scientific classification
- Kingdom: Animalia
- Phylum: Mollusca
- Class: Gastropoda
- Subclass: Caenogastropoda
- Order: Neogastropoda
- Family: Turridae
- Genus: Turridrupa
- Species: T. poppei

Binomial name
- Turridrupa poppei Stahlschmidt & Fraussen, 2011

= Turridrupa poppei =

Species of gastropod

Turridrupa poppei is a species of sea snail, a marine gastropod mollusk in the family Turridae, the turrids.

== Description ==
A broadly claviform shell up to 27.2 mm in height, with the aperture and siphonal canal approximately equal to the spire in length. The protoconch has 2-3 whorls, the first smooth and the last two with strong axial ribs. Teleoconch whorls have three primary spiral cords, with a fourth appearing on the penultimate whorl. The strongest sinus cord has shallow, elliptical gemmules (12-15 per whorl). The body whorl features about 16 primary spiral cords and fine secondary ones. The shell is creamy white with brown spiral cords and gemmule interspaces. The aperture and inner lip are white, with a thick, slightly detached columellar callus and a deep U-shaped sinus. The animal and operculum remain unknown.

== Distribution ==
This marine species occurs off the Philippines, specifically on the coasts of Aliguay and the Cebu municipality of Sogod.
