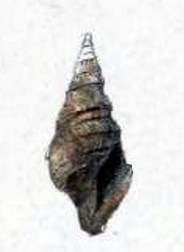
- Original image of Microdrillia niponica

Scientific classification
- Kingdom: Animalia
- Phylum: Mollusca
- Class: Gastropoda
- Subclass: Caenogastropoda
- Order: Neogastropoda
- Superfamily: Conoidea
- Family: Borsoniidae
- Genus: Microdrillia
- Species: M. niponica

Binomial name
- Microdrillia niponica (E. A. Smith, 1879)

Synonyms
- Pleurotoma niponica E. A. Smith, 1879 (original combination)

= Microdrillia niponica =

Species of gastropod

Microdrillia niponica is a species of sea snail, a marine gastropod mollusk in the family Borsoniidae.

== Description ==
The length of the shell attains 7 mm; its width 2 mm..

(Original description) The shell has a shortly fusiform shape and is light brown. It contains 6 ½ whorls. The nucleus consists of 1½ rather large, globose, glassy shining whorls. The four whorls following are strongly keeled around the middle, concave above, with two or three fine spiral lirae, and also concave below the carina, margined at the upper and lower boundaries by a fine thread-like lira arcuately or flexuously elevately striated above the carina, and obliquely but in an opposite direction, beneath it. The body whorl is encircled beneath the principal keel by about ten lirae, whereof the uppermost is the stoutest, the rest gradually becoming finer towards the base. The interstices between them crossed by elevated striae or lines of increment. The aperture is small, brownish, occupying about three-sevenths of the entire length of the shell. Its slit is situated in the concavity above the principal carination. The columella is a little convex or prominent in the middle, and oblique below it. The siphonal canal is short and scarcely recurved.

== Distribution ==
This marine species occurs off Japan.
