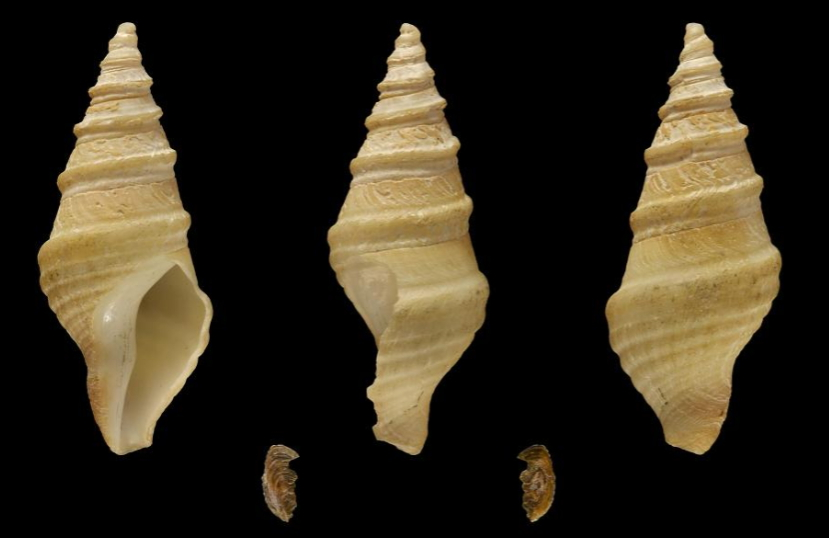

Scientific classification
- Kingdom: Animalia
- Phylum: Mollusca
- Class: Gastropoda
- Subclass: Caenogastropoda
- Order: Neogastropoda
- Superfamily: Conoidea
- Family: Borsoniidae
- Genus: Suavodrillia
- Species: S. kennicotti

Binomial name
- Suavodrillia kennicotti (Dall, 1871)

Synonyms
- Drillia kennicotti Dall, 1871; Cryptodaphne kennicotti (Dall, 1871)

= Suavodrillia kennicotti =

Species of gastropod

Suavodrillia kennicotti is a species of sea snail, a marine gastropod mollusk in the family Borsoniidae.

== Description ==
The size of an adult shell varies between 9 mm and 40 mm. The solid shell is white, with traces of thin yellowish epidermis. There are no longitudinal ribs. The outer lip is deeply excavated below the suture. The margin is thin and the sharp columella is twisted.

== Distribution ==
This species occurs in the Pacific Ocean between Alaska and Taiwan
