= Microdrillia dinos =

Scientific classification
- Kingdom: Animalia
- Phylum: Mollusca
- Class: Gastropoda
- Subclass: Caenogastropoda
- Order: Neogastropoda
- Superfamily: Conoidea
- Family: Borsoniidae
- Genus: Microdrillia
- Species: M. dinos

Binomial name
- Microdrillia dinos Kilburn, 1986

Species of gastropod

Microdrillia dinos is a species of sea snail, a marine gastropod mollusk in the family Borsoniidae.

== Description ==
The small, claviform shell has a maximum length of 7 mm and a width of 2.8 mm. The protoconch contains at least 4 whorls and the teleoconch 5 whorls. The protoconch has 35 axial riblets on its penultimate whorl and 21 to 24 ribs on its last whorl. The collabral threads are weak. On the base of the body whorl one can see 12 to 13 spiral lirae.

== Distribution ==
This marine species occurs on the continental slope of Eastern Transkei, South Africa
