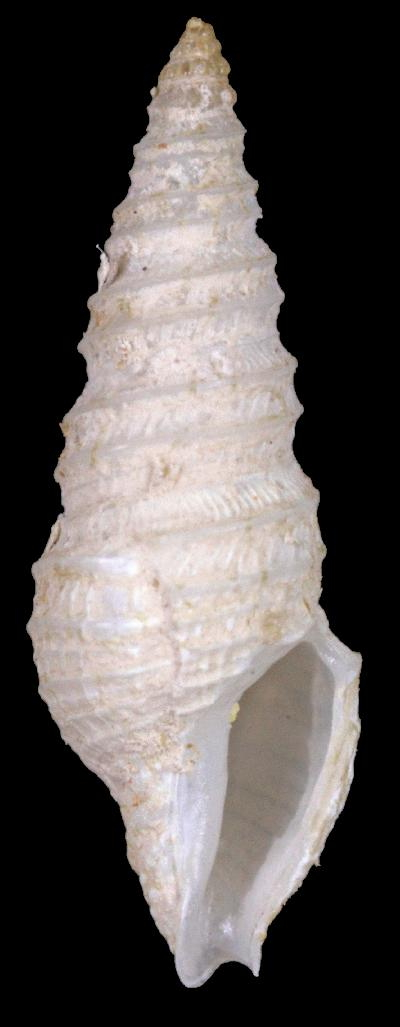
- Shell of Microdrillia trina (specimen at MNHN, Paris)

Scientific classification
- Kingdom: Animalia
- Phylum: Mollusca
- Class: Gastropoda
- Subclass: Caenogastropoda
- Order: Neogastropoda
- Superfamily: Conoidea
- Family: Borsoniidae
- Genus: Microdrillia
- Species: M. trina

Binomial name
- Microdrillia trina Mansfield, 1925

= Microdrillia trina =

Species of gastropod

Microdrillia trina is a species of sea snail, a marine gastropod mollusk in the family Borsoniidae.

== Description ==
The length of the shell attains 10 mm.

(Original description) The shell is slender and rather solid, with a high spire, and it consists of about s eight whorls, four in the protoconch and the other four in the teleoconch. The apical whorl is blunt, scarcely inflated, and smooth. The following nuclear whorls gradually increase in size; they are moderately inflated, constricted at the suture by a spiral thread, and ornamented with about twelve narrow, forward-leaning (protractive), intrasutural axial ribs.

The teleoconch whorls have a shallow, grooved suture and are sculptured chiefly with somewhat keeled, raised spiral cords. A low keel lies adjacent to and just in front of the suture, followed by two stronger and more widely spaced raised cords. The anterior of these is the stronger and forms the periphery of the whorl; it is situated on the lower half of the whorl. In front of it lies a broad, rounded depression that is bordered anteriorly by a small postsutural keel.

The axial sculpture consists of numerous threadlike growth lines, mostly protractive, which intersect the spiral cords and extend along their slopes. On the body whorl there are altogether about seven spiral cords extending from the suture forward to the siphonal fasciole.

The aperture is rather wide, and the anal sinus appears to be quite broad and shallow. The margin of the outer lip is broken, but it is lirate within. The inner lip is formed by a callus, whose lower margin stands erect and forms the border of the short, reflected, and dextrally twisted siphonal canal. The siphonal fasciole is prominent and is crossed by four spiral cords, and a small chink is present behind the siphonal fasciole.

== Distribution ==
This marine species occurs in the Gulf of Mexico.and in the Caribbean Sea. Found as a fossil of the Miocene on Trinidad.
