= Turridrupa albocastanea =

Scientific classification
- Kingdom: Animalia
- Phylum: Mollusca
- Class: Gastropoda
- Subclass: Caenogastropoda
- Order: Neogastropoda
- Family: Turridae
- Genus: Turridrupa
- Species: T. albocastanea

Binomial name
- Turridrupa albocastanea Stahlschmidt, Pauillandre, B.M. Ovivera & Kantor, 2025.

Species of gastropod

Turridrupa albocastanea is a species of sea snail, a marine gastropod mollusc in the family Turridae, the turrids.

== Etymology ==
'albocastanea' refers to the coloration of the shell.

== Description ==
The shell of T. albocastanea is claviform with a spire roughly 1.4 times the height of its aperture made of 8-9 whorls, reaching up to 19.7 mm. The bottom half of the shell is creamy white with distinct brown dashes, while the top half is darker brown.

== Distribution ==
Turridrupa albocastanea has been found in the Philippines, Mariana Islands, and New Caledonia.
