= Drilliola terranigra =

Drilliola terranigra Temporal range: Oligocene–Early Miocene

Scientific classification
- Kingdom: Animalia
- Phylum: Mollusca
- Class: Gastropoda
- Subclass: Caenogastropoda
- Order: Neogastropoda
- Superfamily: Conoidea
- Family: Borsoniidae
- Genus: Drilliola
- Species: D. terranigra

Binomial name
- Drilliola terranigra Lozouet, 2015

Extinct species of gastropod

Drilliola terranigra is an extinct species of sea snail, a marine gastropod mollusk in the family Borsoniidae.

== Distribution ==
This fossil species was found in the Oligocene and the Lower Miocene of Aquitaine (Southwest France)
