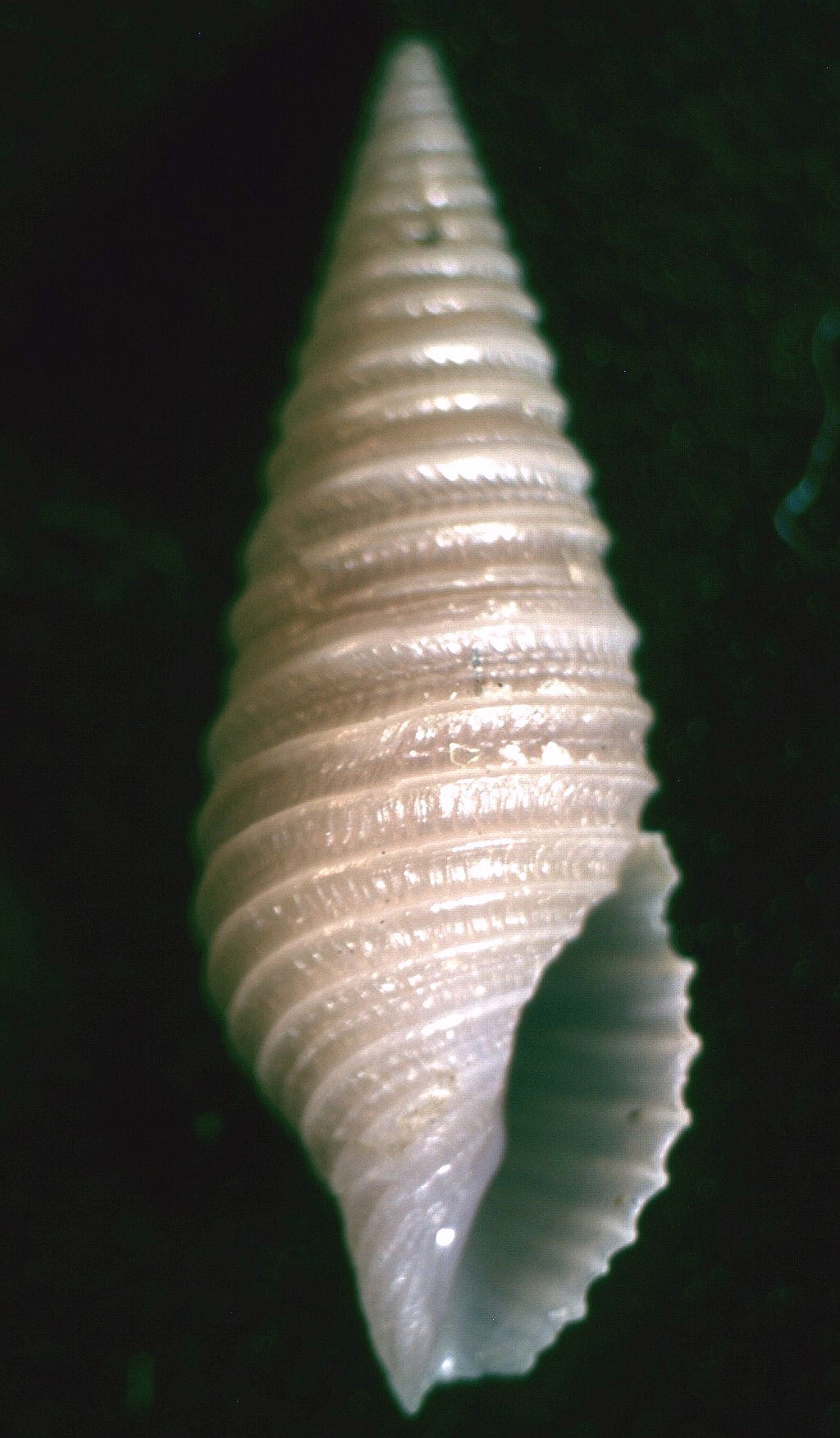
- Apertural view of a shell of Drilliola reevii

Scientific classification
- Kingdom: Animalia
- Phylum: Mollusca
- Class: Gastropoda
- Subclass: Caenogastropoda
- Order: Neogastropoda
- Superfamily: Conoidea
- Family: Borsoniidae
- Genus: Drilliola
- Species: D. reevii

Binomial name
- Drilliola reevii (C. B. Adams, 1850)

Synonyms
- Pleurotoma reevii C. B. Adams, 1850 (original combination); Pleurotoma reevei C. B. Adams, 1850; Pleurotoma vertebralis E.A. Smith; Pleurotoma violacea Hinds, 1843 (junior homonym of Pleurotoma violacea Mighels & Adams, 1842; Pleurotoma reevii is a replacement name); Pleurotoma weinkauffi Weinkauff, H.C. & W. Kobelt, 1875 (nomen nudum); Tomopleura reevii (C. B. Adams, 1850); Turris violacea

= Drilliola reevii =

Species of gastropod

Drilliola reevii is a species of sea snail, a marine gastropod mollusk in the family Borsoniidae.

== Description ==
The size of the shell varies between 8 mm and 13.5 mm. The shell is multicarinate. The interstices are longitudinally striate. The color of the shell is pale violaceous or whitish, sometimes indistinctly fasciated with a darker color above. The columella is one- or two-plaited. The outer lip is acute, crenulated, and shows a slight sinus.

== Distribution ==
This species occurs in the Red Sea and the Persian Gulf; and off Indonesia, New Guinea and the Philippines
