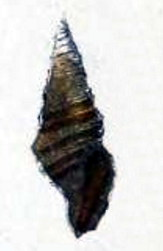
- Original image of a shell of Microdrillia triporcata

Scientific classification
- Kingdom: Animalia
- Phylum: Mollusca
- Class: Gastropoda
- Subclass: Caenogastropoda
- Order: Neogastropoda
- Superfamily: Conoidea
- Family: Borsoniidae
- Genus: Microdrillia
- Species: M. triporcata

Binomial name
- Microdrillia triporcata (E. A. Smith, 1879)

Synonyms
- Pleurotoma triporcata E. A. Smith, 1879 (original combination)

= Microdrillia triporcata =

Species of gastropod

Microdrillia triporcata is a species of sea snail, a marine gastropod mollusk in the family Borsoniidae.

== Description ==
The length of the shell attains 14 mm; its width 4.5 mm..

(Original description) The shell has a shortly fusiform shape. Its color is a uniform pale brown or luteous tint. It contains 9 whorls, the first globular, glassy, rather large, the rest encircled with three distinct keels. The uppermost is just beneath the suture. The median one (the most prominent of all) is situated in the middle of the whorls, and the lowermost a little above the lower suture. The interstices between the carinations are finely latticed with spiral thread-like lirae and raised incremental lines. The former are about three or four in number in each of the interstitial spaces, and the latter very arcuate between the central and uppermost keel, and very oblique beneath the former. The body whorl has about twelve additional carinae or lirae, whereof the four uppermost are stouter and further apart than those beneath. The columella is a little oblique and arcuate above the middle, more sloping below. The lip is thin, very much produced in the middle, widely and deeply notched between the terminations of the uppermost and principal keels. The siphonal canal short and recurved.

== Distribution ==
This marine species occurs off Japan.
