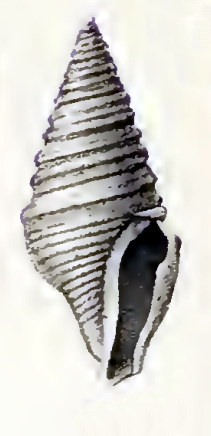
- Original drawing of a shell of Microdrillia circumvertens

Scientific classification
- Kingdom: Animalia
- Phylum: Mollusca
- Class: Gastropoda
- Subclass: Caenogastropoda
- Order: Neogastropoda
- Superfamily: Conoidea
- Family: Borsoniidae
- Genus: Microdrillia
- Species: M. circumvertens

Binomial name
- Microdrillia circumvertens (Melvill & Standen, 1901)

Synonyms
- Drillia circumvertens Melvill & Standen, 1901 (original combination)

= Microdrillia circumvertens =

Species of gastropod

Microdrillia circumvertens is a species of sea snail, a marine gastropod mollusk in the family Borsoniidae.

== Description ==
The height of the small, milky-white shell attains six mm, its width 2.25 mm. It has an ovate-fusiform shape, containing eight whorls. The body whorl is bicarinate. It is a highly spirally carinate and lirate species. The short canal and wide sinus proclaim it rightly placed in Microdrillia and the acute carinae are peculiar. The aperture is oblique and oblong, with the columella containing no plications.

== Distribution ==
This marine species occurs from the Gulf of Oman to Transkei, South Africa
