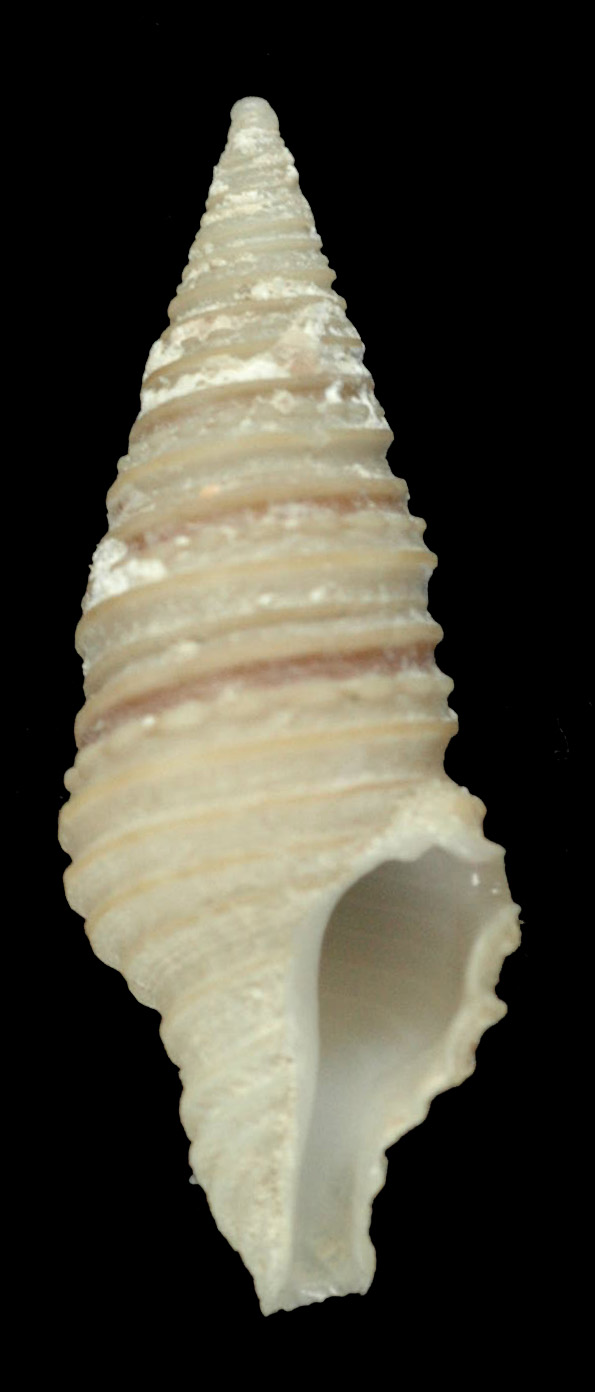
- Shell of Turridrupa armillata (specimen at MNHN, Paris)

Scientific classification
- Kingdom: Animalia
- Phylum: Mollusca
- Class: Gastropoda
- Subclass: Caenogastropoda
- Order: Neogastropoda
- Family: Turridae
- Genus: Turridrupa
- Species: T. armillata

Binomial name
- Turridrupa armillata (Reeve, 1845)

Synonyms
- Pleurotoma armillata Reeve, 1845

= Turridrupa armillata =

Species of gastropod

Turridrupa armillata is a species of sea snail, a marine gastropod mollusk in the family Turridae, the turrids.

== Description ==
The length of the shell attains 29.7 mm.

== Distribution ==
This marine species occurs off the Philippines and Papua New Guinea.
