= Drilliola speyeri =

Drilliola speyeri Temporal range: Oligocene–Lower Miocene

Scientific classification
- Kingdom: Animalia
- Phylum: Mollusca
- Class: Gastropoda
- Subclass: Caenogastropoda
- Order: Neogastropoda
- Superfamily: Conoidea
- Family: Borsoniidae
- Genus: Drilliola
- Species: D. speyeri

Binomial name
- Drilliola speyeri (Kock & Wiechmann, 1872)

Synonyms
- † Pleurotoma speyeri Kock & Wiechmann, 1872 (original combination)

Extinct species of gastropod

Drilliola speyeri is an extinct species of sea snail, a marine gastropod mollusk in the family Borsoniidae.

== Distribution ==
This fossil species was found in the Oligocene and the Lower Miocene of Aquitaine (Southwest France)
