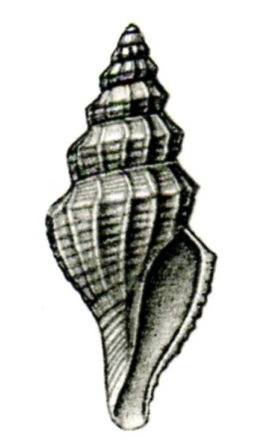
- Drawing of a shell of Bela chuni (holotype)

Scientific classification
- Kingdom: Animalia
- Phylum: Mollusca
- Class: Gastropoda
- Subclass: Caenogastropoda
- Order: Neogastropoda
- Superfamily: Conoidea
- Family: Mangeliidae
- Genus: Bela
- Species: B. chuni

Binomial name
- Bela chuni Thiele, 1925

Synonyms
- Bela (Acrobela) sansibarica Thiele, J., 1925

= Bela chuni =

Species of gastropod

Bela chuni is a species of sea snail, a marine gastropod mollusk in the family Mangeliidae.

According to the World Register of Marine Species, Bela (Acrobela) sansibarica Thiele, J., 1925 is a synonym of Microdrillia sansibarica (Thiele, 1925)

== Distribution ==
This marine species occurs off Zanzibar.
