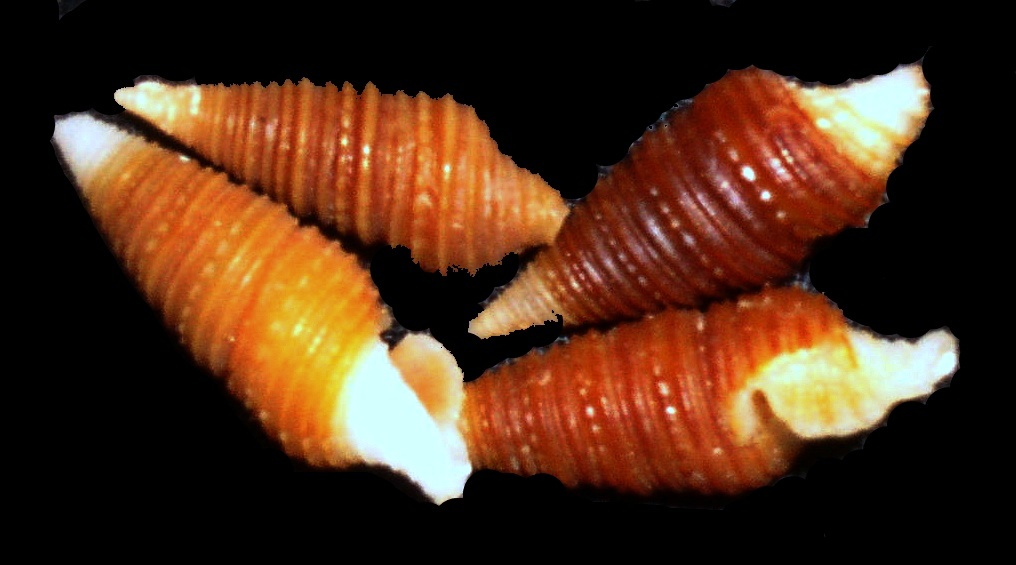
- shells of Turridrupa jubata

Scientific classification
- Kingdom: Animalia
- Phylum: Mollusca
- Class: Gastropoda
- Subclass: Caenogastropoda
- Order: Neogastropoda
- Superfamily: Conoidea
- Family: Turridae
- Genus: Turridrupa
- Species: T. jubata

Binomial name
- Turridrupa jubata (Reeve, 1843)

Synonyms
- Pleurotoma jubata Reeve, 1843; Pleurotoma (Hemipleurotoma) jubata Hinds, 1843; Pleurotoma rimata Preston, 1908 ( invalid: junior homonym of Pleurotoma rimata E. A. Smith, 1888; Turridrupa prestoni is a replacement name); Turridrupa prestoni A. W. B. Powell, 1967 junior subjective synonym

= Turridrupa jubata =

Species of gastropod

Turridrupa jubata, common name the crested pleurotoma, is a species of sea snail, a marine gastropod mollusk in the family Turridae, the turrids.

== Description ==
The length of the shell attains 33.7 millimetres (1.33 in).

The smooth shell is acuminately fusiform. It is yellowish brown, the anterior end is white. The whorls are many-keeled. The middle keel is the largest, with a beaded row of granules immediately over it (about 25 per whorl). The siphonal canal is rather short.

The sinus apex is situated at the end of the mid-shoulder cord. The sinus cord is finely gemmate.

The whorls are covered with several keels, of which the middle one is the largest. They contain a beaded row of granules immediately over it. The shell is yellowish brown.

(Original description of Turridrupa prestoni) The turreted shell is yellowish brown. It contains 11 whorls, the upper bearing two spiral ridges between which is a row of coarse tubercles, the intervening spaces sculptured with minute spiral and transverse striae. The body whorl bears five spiral lirae in addition to the row of tubercles between the first two of these. The base of the shell is coarsely spirally lirate. The aperture is oval. The peristomeis reflexed especially round the . The sinus is broad and rather deep. The columella lip is expanded, erect and forms an umbilical fissure between it and the base of the shell. The siphonal canal is rather long, slightly reflexed upwards at base.

== Distribution ==
This marine species occurs off the Philippines, Indonesia, Japan, New Caledonia and Papua New Guinea
