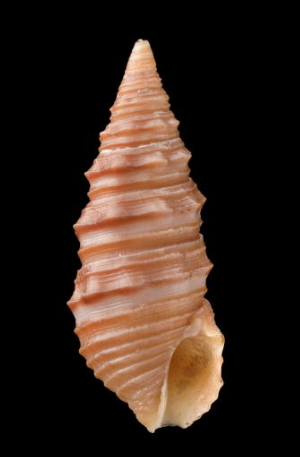
- Shell of Turridrupa albofasciata (holotype at the Museum of Natural History, London)

Scientific classification
- Kingdom: Animalia
- Phylum: Mollusca
- Class: Gastropoda
- Subclass: Caenogastropoda
- Order: Neogastropoda
- Superfamily: Conoidea
- Family: Turridae
- Genus: Turridrupa
- Species: T. albofasciata

Binomial name
- Turridrupa albofasciata (E.A. Smith, 1877)

Synonyms
- Pleurotoma albofasciata E.A. Smith, 1877

= Turridrupa albofasciata =

Species of gastropod

Turridrupa albofasciata is a species of sea snail, a marine gastropod mollusk in the family Turridae, the turrids.

== Description ==
The length of the shell attains 18 mm.

== Distribution ==
This marine species occurs the Philippines, Hawaii and Papua New Guinea.
