= Turridrupa akhaiderensis =

Scientific classification
- Kingdom: Animalia
- Phylum: Mollusca
- Class: Gastropoda
- Subclass: Caenogastropoda
- Order: Neogastropoda
- Superfamily: Conoidea
- Family: Turridae
- Genus: Turridrupa
- Species: T. akhaiderensis

Binomial name
- Turridrupa akhaiderensis (E.A. Smith, 1877)

Synonyms
- Gemmula (Turridrupa) akhaiderensis Houssein L.Abbas, 1977

Species of gastropod

Turridrupa akhaiderensis is an extinct species of sea snail, a marine gastropod mollusk in the family Turridae, the turrids.

== Description ==
The length of the shell attains 14 mm.

== Distribution ==
This extinct marine species was found in Helvetian strata in the Cairo-Suez district, Egypt.
