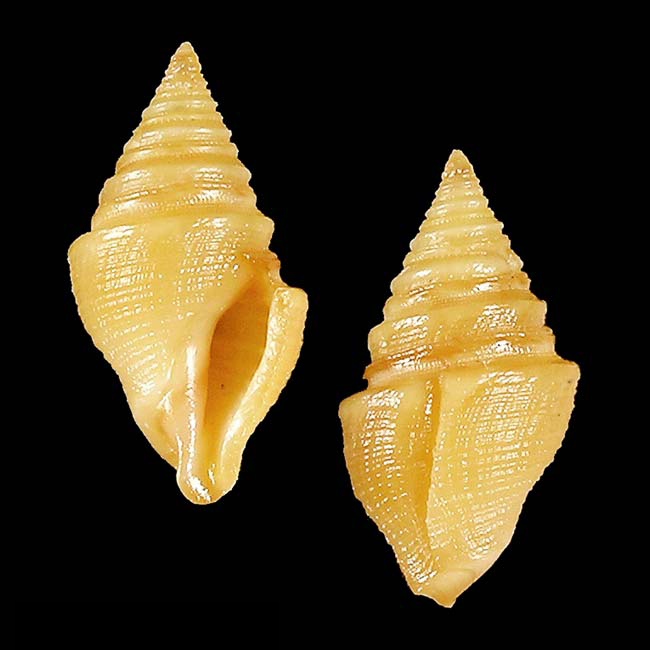

Scientific classification
- Kingdom: Animalia
- Phylum: Mollusca
- Class: Gastropoda
- Subclass: Caenogastropoda
- Order: Neogastropoda
- Family: Borsoniidae
- Genus: Microdrillia
- Species: M. rhomboidales

Binomial name
- Microdrillia rhomboidales Poppe, Tagaro & Goto, 2018

= Microdrillia rhomboidales =

Species of gastropod

Microdrillia rhomboidales is a species of sea snail, a marine gastropod mollusk in the family Borsoniidae.

== Description ==
The length of the shell attains 9.6 mm.

== Distribution ==
This marine species occurs off the Philippines.
