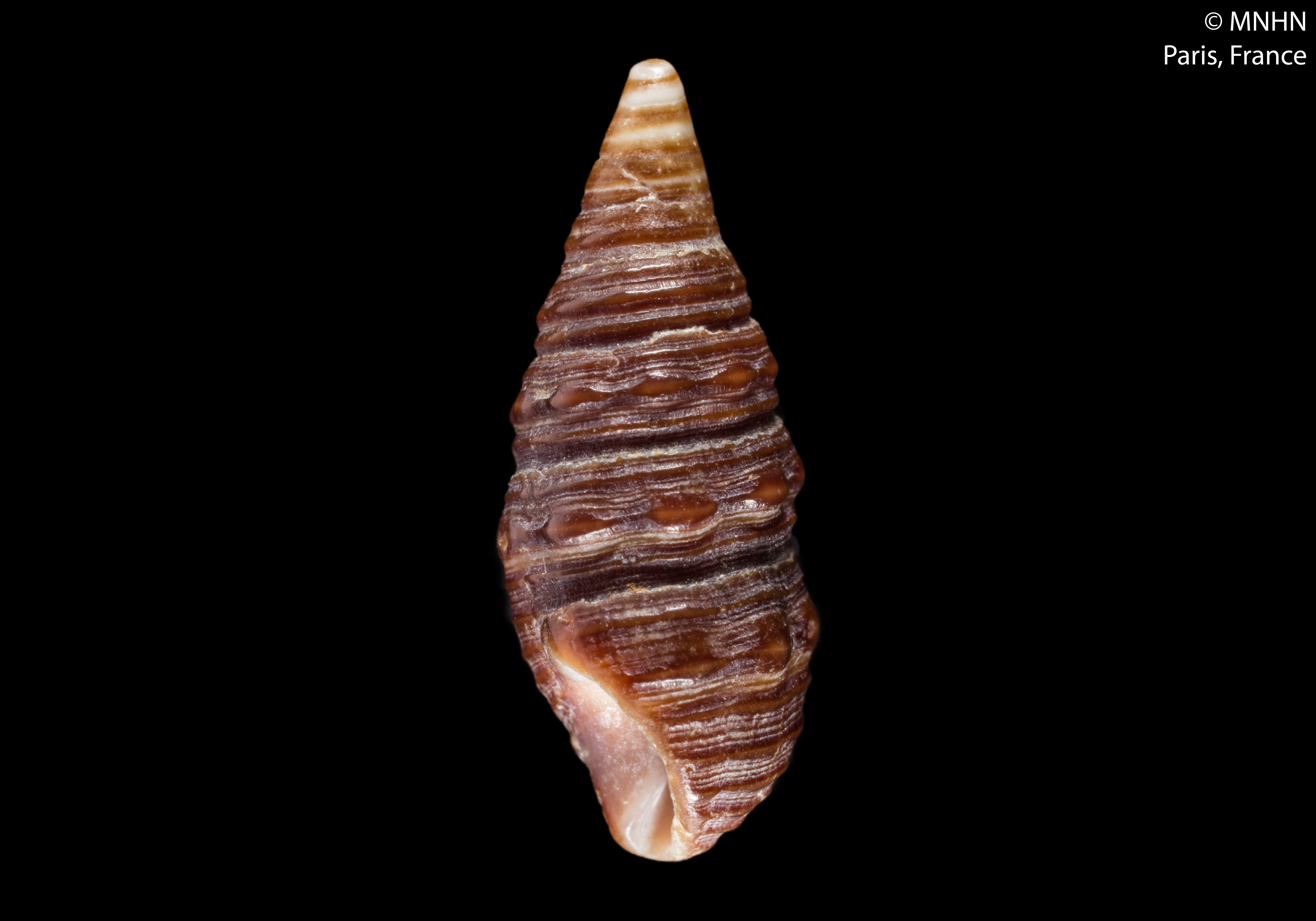
- Shell of Turridrupa gatchensis (syntype at MNHN, Paris)

Scientific classification
- Kingdom: Animalia
- Phylum: Mollusca
- Class: Gastropoda
- Subclass: Caenogastropoda
- Order: Neogastropoda
- Superfamily: Conoidea
- Family: Turridae
- Genus: Turridrupa
- Species: T. gatchensis

Binomial name
- Turridrupa gatchensis (Hervier, 1896)

Synonyms
- Surcula gatchensis Hervier, 1896

= Turridrupa gatchensis =

Species of gastropod

Turridrupa gatchensis is a species of sea snail, a marine gastropod mollusk in the family Turridae, the turrids.

== Description ==
The length of the shell varies between 13 mm and 15 mm.

== Distribution ==
This marine species occurs off New Caledonia and the Loyalty Islands.
