= Microdrillia sagamiensis =

Scientific classification
- Kingdom: Animalia
- Phylum: Mollusca
- Class: Gastropoda
- Subclass: Caenogastropoda
- Order: Neogastropoda
- Superfamily: Conoidea
- Family: Borsoniidae
- Genus: Microdrillia
- Species: M. sagamiensis

Binomial name
- Microdrillia sagamiensis Kuroda & Oyama, 1971

Species of gastropod

Microdrillia sagamiensis is a species of sea snail, a marine gastropod mollusk in the family Borsoniidae.

== Distribution ==
This marine species occurs in the Sagami Bay, Japan, and off the Philippines.
