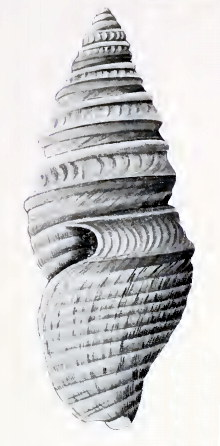
- Original drawing of a shell of Microdrillia commentica

Scientific classification
- Kingdom: Animalia
- Phylum: Mollusca
- Class: Gastropoda
- Subclass: Caenogastropoda
- Order: Neogastropoda
- Superfamily: Conoidea
- Family: Borsoniidae
- Genus: Microdrillia
- Species: M. commentica

Binomial name
- Microdrillia commentica (Hedley, 1915)

Synonyms
- Drillia commenticus Hedley, 1915 (original combination); Turridrupa commentica Ch. Hedley, 1922

= Microdrillia commentica =

Species of gastropod

Microdrillia commentica is a species of sea snail, a marine gastropod mollusk in the family Borsoniidae.

== Description ==
The height of the small shell attains 7 mm.

(Original description) The small, solid shell has a narrowly fusiform shape. Its colour is uniform cream. The shell contains nine whorls. The first three are small and smooth, the next ones with a dozen prominent curved radial ribs. On the following whorl, a keel arises from the base, reaches the periphery, and, as a conspicuous median keel, descends to the aperture. The upper whorls have a second conspicuous spiral keel below the suture, between which and the peripheral keel lies the fasciole, a third and fainter keel runs below the median. On the body whorl, there are about a dozen spirals below the main keel. The fasciole is sculptured by transverse crescentic threads becoming weaker on the later whorls. Radial threads also appear over the whole shell. The aperture is narrow, notch deep, subsutural. The outer lip is simple, thin and projecting. The siphonal canal is broad and short.

== Distribution ==
This marine species is endemic to Australia and occurs off Queensland.
