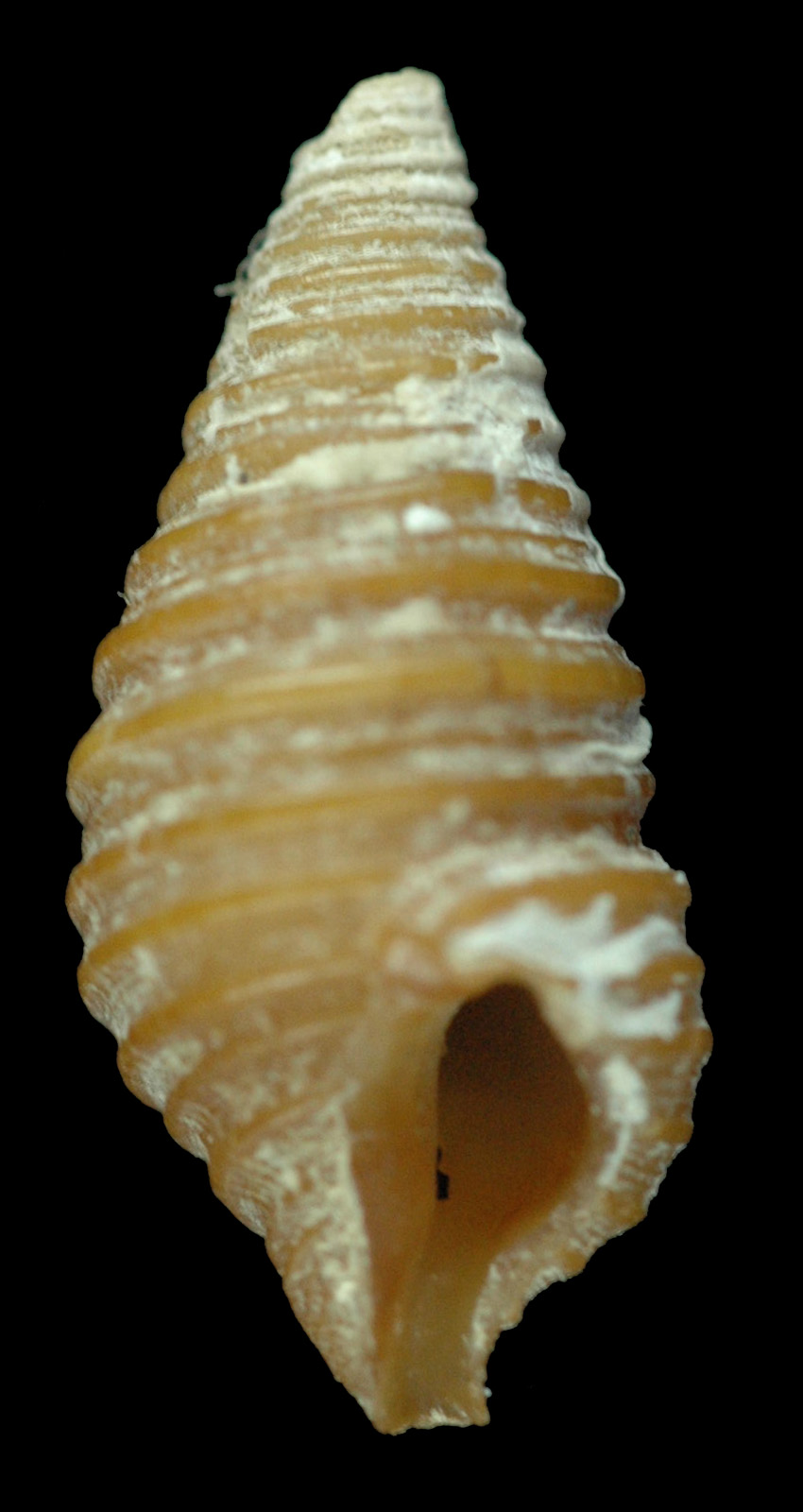
- Shell of Turridrupa cincta (specimen at MNHN, Paris)

Scientific classification
- Kingdom: Animalia
- Phylum: Mollusca
- Class: Gastropoda
- Subclass: Caenogastropoda
- Order: Neogastropoda
- Family: Turridae
- Genus: Turridrupa
- Species: T. cincta

Binomial name
- Turridrupa cincta (Lamarck, 1822)

Synonyms
- Pleurotoma cincta Lamarck, 1822; Surcula cincta (Lamarck, 1822); Turris cincta

= Turridrupa cincta =

Species of gastropod

Turridrupa cincta is a species of sea snail, a marine gastropod mollusk in the family Turridae, the turrids.

== Description ==
The length of the broad shell attains 20 mm.

The spire is convex in outline, slightly acuminated towards the tip. The whorls are encircled throughout with tumid ridges. The shell is yellowish brown or reddish brown. The aperture has the same color.

The sinus apex is situated at the end of the mid-shoulder cord. The cords are smooth. The color of the shell is yellowish brown.

== Distribution ==
This marine species occurs in the Indian Ocean off Madagascar, Mauritius and off the Mascarenes; also off Japan, the Philippines and Papua New Guinea.
