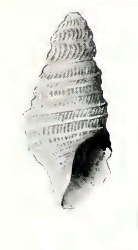
- Original image of a shell of Drilliola zeuxippe

Scientific classification
- Kingdom: Animalia
- Phylum: Mollusca
- Class: Gastropoda
- Subclass: Caenogastropoda
- Order: Neogastropoda
- Superfamily: Conoidea
- Family: Borsoniidae
- Genus: Drilliola
- Species: D. zeuxippe

Binomial name
- Drilliola zeuxippe (Dall, 1919)

Synonyms
- Microdrillia zeuxippe (Dall, 1919); Taranis zeuxippe Dall, 1919 (original combination)

= Drilliola zeuxippe =

Species of gastropod

Drilliola zeuxippe is a species of sea snail, a marine gastropod mollusk in the family Borsoniidae.

== Description ==
The height of the shell attains 3.8 mm, its width 2.2 mm.

(Original description) The minute shell has a white or warm brown color. The turbinate nucleus has a minute smooth apex and three later axially concavely arcuate ribbed whorls. The 3½ subsequent whorls show a distinct suture. The spiral sculpture shows between the sutures two prominent keels and an anterior smaller one on which the suture is laid. On the body whorl there are about eight minor threads in front of those mentioned, all with wider interspaces. The axial sculpture consists of prominent oblique lines protractively cutting the interspaces. The anal sulcus is shallow, distinct and close to the suture. The outer lip is thi and slightly produced. The inner lip is erased. The columella is short and straight. The siphonal canal is hardly differentiated.

== Distribution ==
This marine species occurs off the Galapagos Islands.
