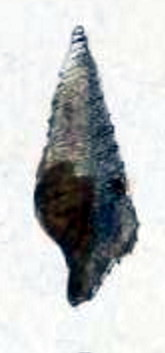
- Original image of Drilliola difficilis

Scientific classification
- Kingdom: Animalia
- Phylum: Mollusca
- Class: Gastropoda
- Subclass: Caenogastropoda
- Order: Neogastropoda
- Superfamily: Conoidea
- Family: Borsoniidae
- Genus: Drilliola
- Species: D. difficilis

Binomial name
- Drilliola difficilis (E. A. Smith, 1879)

Synonyms
- Microdrillia difficilis (E. A. Smith, 1879); Pleurotoma difficilis E. A. Smith, 1879 (original combination)

= Drilliola difficilis =

Species of gastropod

Drilliola difficilis is a species of sea snail, a marine gastropod mollusk in the family Borsoniidae.

== Description ==
The length of the shell attains 7 mm; its width 2 mm.. The shell contains about ten rather coarse spiral lirae on the body whorl. The sinus is situated above the submedian liration. The shell has a brownish horn-color.

(Original description) The shell has a shortly fusiform shape and has a brownish horn-colour. The whorls are nearly flat, strongly keeled a little below the middle, and above at the suture, with one or two thread-like spiral lirae in the spaces between these two carinae and between the subcentral one and the suture below it. The lines of growth are moderately distinct, raised, flexuous, and more or less oblique. The nucleus (or the three apical whorls) is smooth, glassy, shining, convex. The fourth whorl is also convex and coarsely obliquely costate. The body whorl is encircled by about ten coarsish lirae, whereof the three uppermost are equal in size to the submedian carina of the upper whorls, which falls just above them on this volution. The interstices between them are coarsely striated by the lines of growth. The aperture is small, occupying three-sevenths of the entire length. The columella is brown, coated with a smooth enamel, oblique below the middle. It is slit above the submedian liration. The siphonal canal is short, very little recurved. The operculum is ovate, pointed at the base. Its nucleus is apical.

== Distribution ==
This marine species occurs off Japan.
