= Drilliola maoria =

Scientific classification
- Kingdom: Animalia
- Phylum: Mollusca
- Class: Gastropoda
- Subclass: Caenogastropoda
- Order: Neogastropoda
- Superfamily: Conoidea
- Family: Borsoniidae
- Genus: Drilliola
- Species: D. maoria

Binomial name
- Drilliola maoria Powell A.W.B., 1942

Extinct species of gastropod

Drilliola maoria is an extinct species of sea snail, a marine gastropod mollusk in the family Borsoniidae.

== Distribution ==
This fossil species was endemic to New Zealand.
