= Retidrillia willetti =

Scientific classification
- Kingdom: Animalia
- Phylum: Mollusca
- Class: Gastropoda
- Subclass: Caenogastropoda
- Order: Neogastropoda
- Superfamily: Conoidea
- Family: Borsoniidae
- Genus: Retidrillia
- Species: R. willetti

Binomial name
- Retidrillia willetti (Dall, 1919)

Synonyms
- Suavodrillia willetti Dall, 1919 (original combination)

Species of gastropod

Retidrillia willetti is a species of sea snail, a marine gastropod mollusk in the family Borsoniidae.

== Description ==
The length of the shell attains 10 mm, its width 4.5 mm.

(Original description) The small, white shell has a pale operculum with an apical protoconch. The whorls of the protoconch are translucent white, glassy, inflated, about one and a half in number, then gradually passing into the reticulate sculpture of the five or six subsequent turns. The suture is appressed with one or two close-set prominent spiral threads in front of it. The whorls are sloping forward flatly from these threads to an angle at the shoulder forming the periphery. This part of the whorl is minutely spirally threaded. The other spiral sculpture consists of (on the base about five) strong threads with wider interspaces containing minor threads all merging toward and on the siphonal canal into a series of subequal close-set threads. The anal fasciole has its deepest part at the shoulder angle, but the arcuate incremental lines on the whorl behind the angle indicate that it was when complete wide and shallow. The axial sculpture consists of (on the penultimate whorl about 16) strongly protractive short ribs starting at the shoulder, which they slightly nodulate, and reaching to the suture, but obsolete on the body whorl and not reaching much beyond the periphery The outer lip is thin and sharp. The inner lip is erased. The columella is short and obliquely attenuated in front. The siphonal canal is short, distinct and slightly recurved.

== Distribution ==
This marine species occurs off Southeastern Alaska.
