= Microdrillia pertinax =

Scientific classification
- Kingdom: Animalia
- Phylum: Mollusca
- Class: Gastropoda
- Subclass: Caenogastropoda
- Order: Neogastropoda
- Superfamily: Conoidea
- Family: Borsoniidae
- Genus: Microdrillia
- Species: M. pertinax

Binomial name
- Microdrillia pertinax Hedley, 1922

Synonyms
- Turridrupa pertinax Hedley, 1922 (original combination

Species of gastropod

Microdrillia pertinax is a species of sea snail, a marine gastropod mollusk in the family Borsoniidae.

== Description ==
The length of the shell attains 4.8 mm.

(Original description) The small shell has a cylindro-fusiform shape. It is contracted at the base. Its colour is pale buff, darker on the base and the columella. It contains eight whorls, including the protoconch. The suture is deeply channelled.

Sculpture :—On the body whorl there is a prominent keel on the shoulder, followed anteriorly by seven evenly spaced and gradually diminishing spirals. Above the keel is a broad fasciole, crossed by fine crescentic riblets and bounded by a small spiral. On the upper whorls three spirals alone persist, the median being prominent.

The aperture is narrow. The sinus is wide and rather short. The siphonal canal is short and a little reflected. The columella is straight, with a thickened margin.

== Distribution ==
This marine species occurs off the Philippines and Queensland, Australia.
