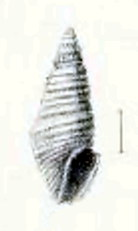
- Original drawing of a shell of Microdrillia patricia

Scientific classification
- Kingdom: Animalia
- Phylum: Mollusca
- Class: Gastropoda
- Subclass: Caenogastropoda
- Order: Neogastropoda
- Superfamily: Conoidea
- Family: Borsoniidae
- Genus: Microdrillia
- Species: M. patricia

Binomial name
- Microdrillia patricia (Melvill, 1904)

Synonyms
- Pleurotoma (Oligotoma) patricia Melvill, 1904 (original combination); Turris (Tomopleura) patricia Melvill, 1917

= Microdrillia patricia =

Species of gastropod

Microdrillia patricia is a species of sea snail, a marine gastropod mollusk in the family Borsoniidae.

== Description ==
The small, claviform shell has a maximum length of 6 mm and a width of 2.1 mm. The protoconch contains at least 6 whorls and the teleoconch 5½ convex whorls. The protoconch has 15–16 axial ribs on its penultimate whorl and 21 to 24 ribs on its last whorl. The collabral threads are strong. On the base of the body whorl one can see 7 to 9 spiral lirae. The aperture is oblong. The siphonal canal is short.

== Distribution ==
This marine species occurs from the Gulf of Oman to continental shelf of Western Transkei, South Africa
