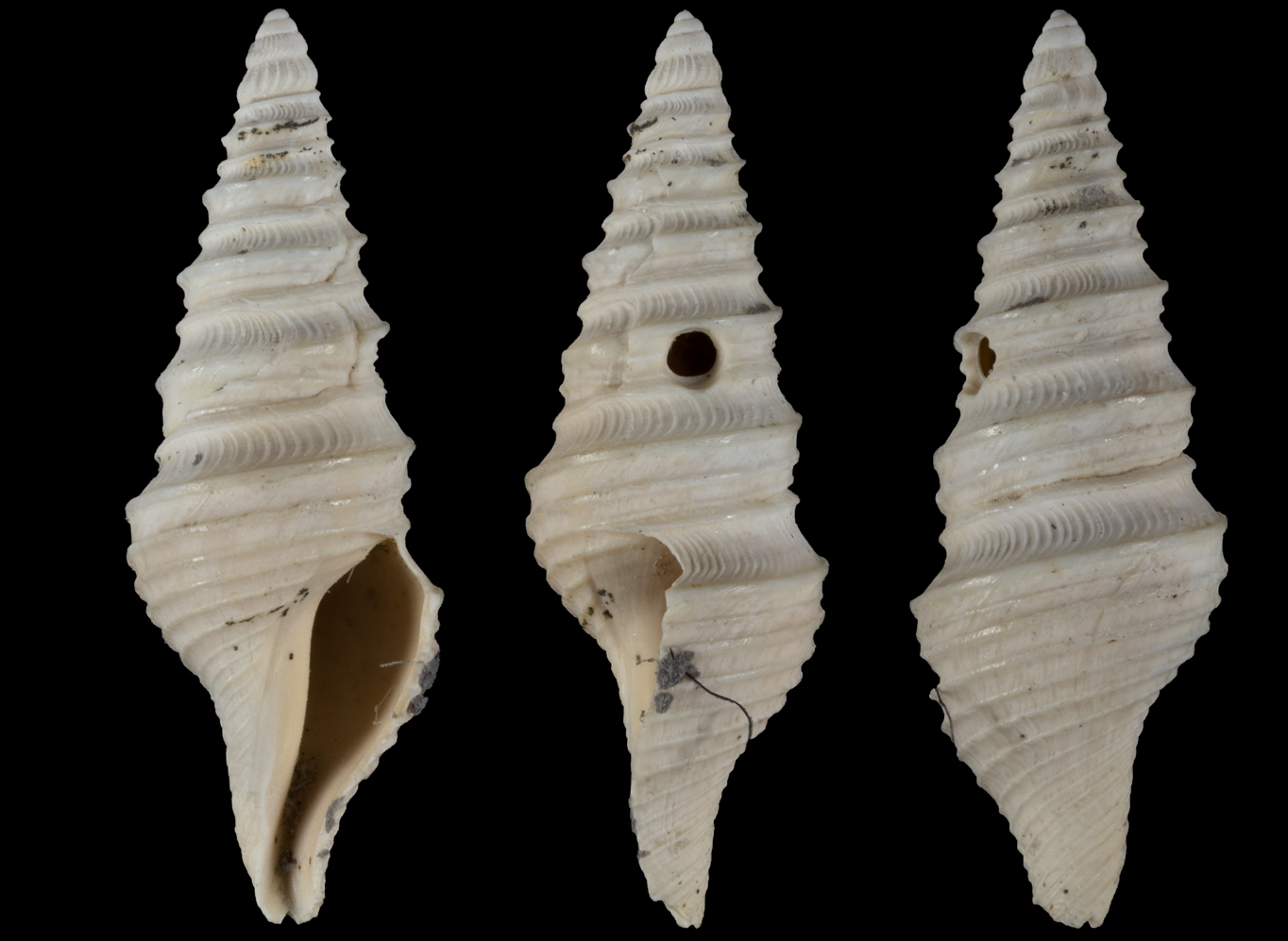
- Shells of Drilliola crispata (specimen at MNHN, Paris)

Scientific classification
- Kingdom: Animalia
- Phylum: Mollusca
- Class: Gastropoda
- Subclass: Caenogastropoda
- Order: Neogastropoda
- Superfamily: Conoidea
- Family: Borsoniidae
- Genus: Drilliola
- Species: D. crispata

Binomial name
- Drilliola crispata (Cristofori & Jan, 1832)

Synonyms
- Pleurotoma crispata Cristofori & Jan, 1832 (original combination); Pleurotoma renieri Scacchi, A., 1835

= Drilliola crispata =

Extinct species of gastropod

Microdrillia crispata is an extinct species of sea snail, a marine gastropod mollusk in the family Borsoniidae.

There is one subspecies: Microdrillia crispata vatreni Della Bella & Tabanelli, 1986

== Description ==
The length of the shell attains 5 mm. The shell is acuminately turreted. The whorls are convex, with numerous prominent revolving carinae, the interstices narrow, obliquely longitudinally striated. The color of the shell is white, the apex tinged with fuscous. The siphonal canal is very short. The sinus is ample.

== Distribution ==
This extinct marine species has been found in Northeast Brasil. It also occurred in the Upper Pliocene of Romagna, Italy.
