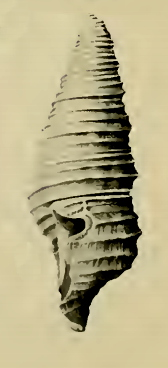
- Original drawing of a shell of Turridrupa deceptrix

Scientific classification
- Kingdom: Animalia
- Phylum: Mollusca
- Class: Gastropoda
- Subclass: Caenogastropoda
- Order: Neogastropoda
- Superfamily: Conoidea
- Family: Turridae
- Genus: Turridrupa
- Species: T. deceptrix

Binomial name
- Turridrupa deceptrix Hedley, 1922

= Turridrupa deceptrix =

Species of gastropod

Turridrupa deceptrix is a species of sea snail, a marine gastropod mollusk in the family Turridae, the turrids.

== Description ==
The length of the shell attains 22.5 mm, its diameter 17.9 mm.

(Original description) The very solid shell has an elongate-conic shape. It is contracted at the base, constricted and channelled at the suture. The body whorl measures about half the total length. The shell contains eleven whorls, including the protoconch0 Its colour is pale ochraceons-buff, the aperture lighter.

Sculpture: The body whorl contains thirteen, penultimate with four, and earlier whorls with three prominent spiral keels. The furrows between carry faint radial striae, and sometimes a small interstitial thread.

Aperture: there is a thin callus sheet on the inner lip, and a solid callus plug at the angle of the aperture. The outer lip is simple. The sinus has a semicircular notch with reflected margin. The siphonal canal is short, open, and slightly recurved. Deep within the throat are five revolving raised threads.

== Distribution ==
This marine species occurs in the South China Sea; off Japan, Indonesia, West New Guinea, Australia and the Andaman Islands.
