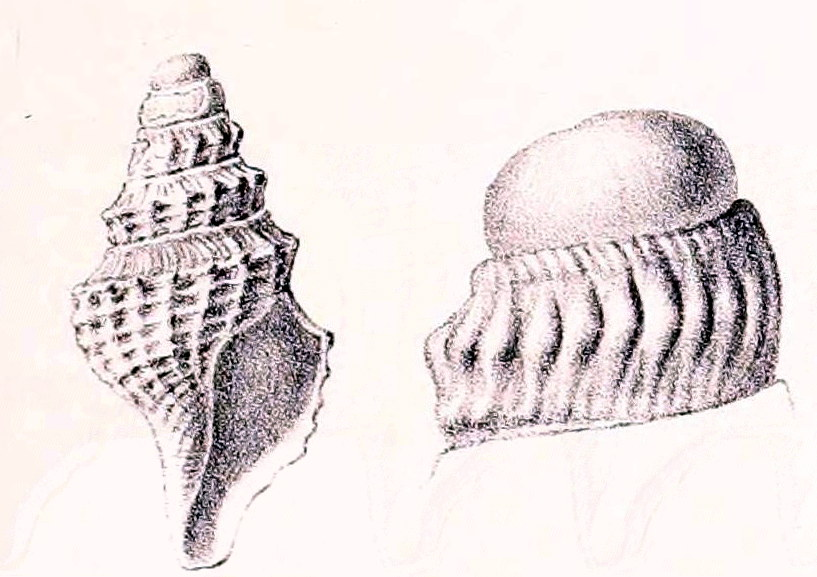
- Original drawing with an apertural view and the protoconch of a shell of Retidrillia megalacme

Scientific classification
- Kingdom: Animalia
- Phylum: Mollusca
- Class: Gastropoda
- Subclass: Caenogastropoda
- Order: Neogastropoda
- Superfamily: Conoidea
- Family: Borsoniidae
- Genus: Retidrillia
- Species: R. megalacme

Binomial name
- Retidrillia megalacme (Sykes, 1906)

Synonyms
- Drilliola megalacme (Sykes, 1906); Spirotropis megalacme Sykes, 1906 (original combination)

= Retidrillia megalacme =

Species of gastropod

Retidrillia megalacme is a species of sea snail, a marine gastropod mollusk in the family Borsoniidae.

== Description ==
The length of the shell attains 5 mm, its width 2.5 mm.

(Original description) The small shell has a conical-fusiform shape. The spire is well raised and fairly solid. Its colour (dead) is whitish-brown, with a white protoconch. It contains 6. turreted whorls, regularly increasing. The white protoconch is large. The first whorl and a half are smooth, then closely set longitudinal riblets are seen, and the whorl becomes carinate. The remaining whorls are acutely carinate, with an area below the suture, either smooth or with arcuate striae. Below the carina appear numerous longitudinal riblets, decussated by spiral carinations, giving the shell a somewhat prickly or nodulous appearance. The aperture is small, with a well-marked sinuation above. The columella is vertical, a little twisted at the base.

== Distribution ==
This species occurs in the Atlantic Ocean off Portugal.
