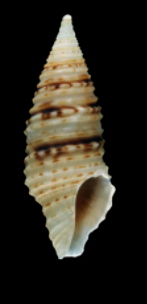
- Shell of Turridrupa diffusa

Scientific classification
- Kingdom: Animalia
- Phylum: Mollusca
- Class: Gastropoda
- Subclass: Caenogastropoda
- Order: Neogastropoda
- Family: Turridae
- Genus: Turridrupa
- Species: T. diffusa

Binomial name
- Turridrupa diffusa Powell, 1967

Synonyms
- Turridrupa aff. diffusa (Powell, 1967)

= Turridrupa diffusa =

Species of gastropod

Turridrupa diffusa is a species of sea snail, a marine gastropod mollusk in the family Turridae, the turrids.

== Description ==
The length of the shell differs between 12 mm and 17.5 mm. The sinus apex is situated at the end of the peripheral cord, which contains unicolored dashes defined by blotches.

== Distribution ==
This marine species occurs off the Marshall Islands, Samoa, and New Caledonia.
