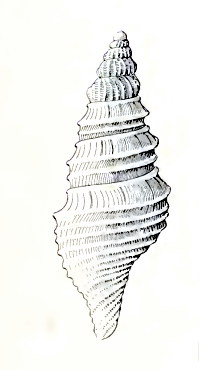
- Original drawing of a shell of Microdrillia fastosa

Scientific classification
- Kingdom: Animalia
- Phylum: Mollusca
- Class: Gastropoda
- Subclass: Caenogastropoda
- Order: Neogastropoda
- Superfamily: Conoidea
- Family: Borsoniidae
- Genus: Microdrillia
- Species: M. fastosa

Binomial name
- Microdrillia fastosa (Hedley, 1907)

Synonyms
- Pleurotomella fastosa Hedley, 1907 (original combination); Turridrupa fastosa (Hedley, 1907)

= Microdrillia fastosa =

Species of gastropod

Microdrillia fastosa is a species of sea snail, a marine gastropod mollusk in the family Borsoniidae.

== Description ==
The height of the shell attains 5 mm, its width 1.9 mm.

(Original description) The shell is small, rather solid, slender and has a fusiform shape. It contains 8½ whorls of which six form the protoconch. The colour of adult whorls is straw yellow, the protoconch cinnamon brown.

Sculpture : running below the suture the adult whorls have a spiral thread which ascends into the protoconch for two whorls. This is followed by a broad concave fasciole, margined in turn by a sharp projecting keel which determines an angle in the contour of the shell. Halfway between the major keel and the suture runs a smaller keel. On the body whorl there are about fourteen spirals, gradually diminishing anteriorly, below the major keel. The fasciole is ornamented by spaced, delicate, concave riblets. Fine arcuate growth lines appear in the interstices of the spiral keels. In the protoconch, the first wliorl and a half are small, rounded, and spirally striate. The rest protrude medially, and are crossed by fine sharp radial riblets, which on the last whorl number twenty-two. Their interstices are latticed by spiral threads.

== Distribution ==
This marine species is endemic to Australia and occurs off New South Wales.
