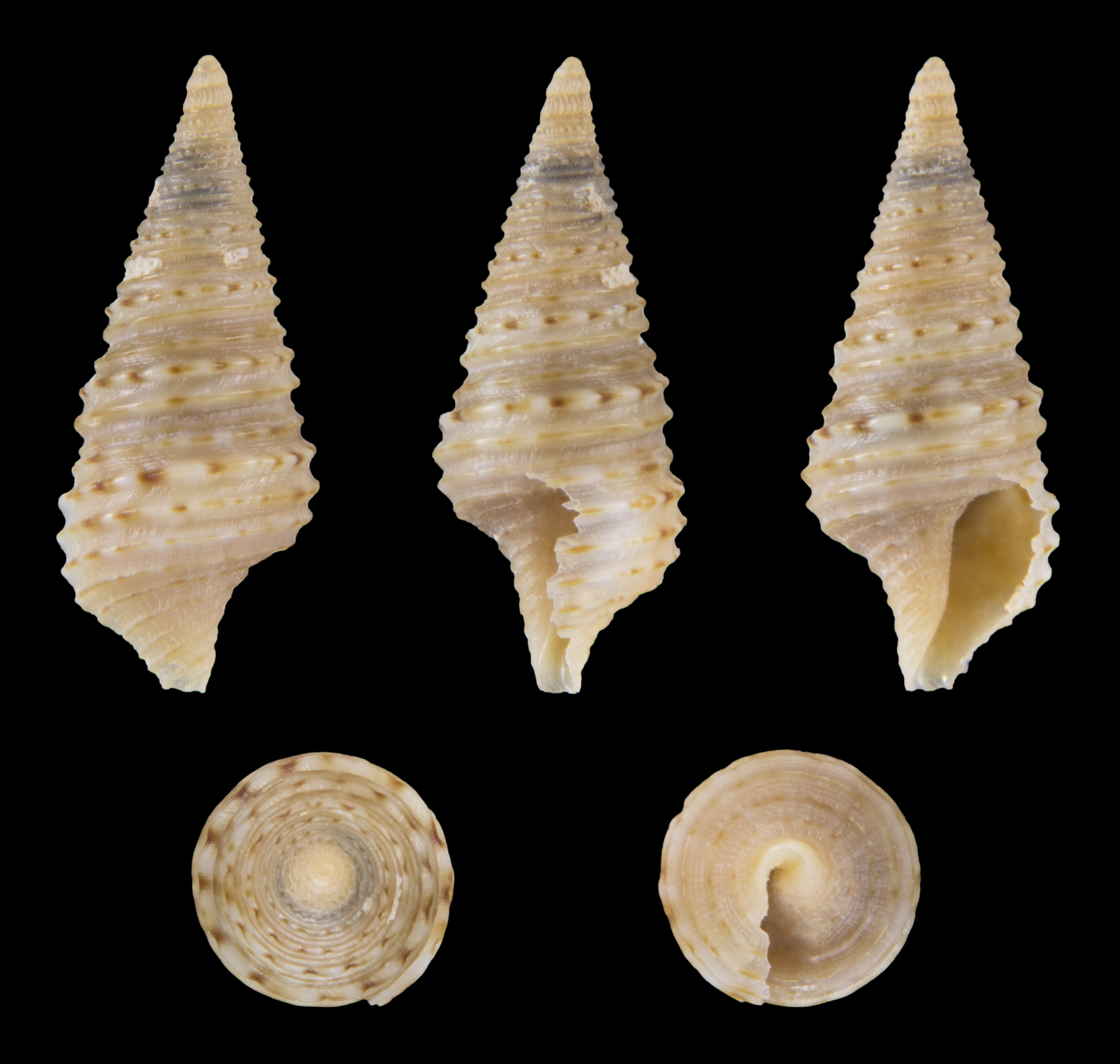
- Shells of Turridrupa consobrina

Scientific classification
- Kingdom: Animalia
- Phylum: Mollusca
- Class: Gastropoda
- Subclass: Caenogastropoda
- Order: Neogastropoda
- Superfamily: Conoidea
- Family: Turridae
- Genus: Turridrupa
- Species: T. consobrina

Binomial name
- Turridrupa consobrina Powell, 1967

Synonyms
- Turridrupa astricta consobrina Powell, 1967 (original rank)

= Turridrupa consobrina =

Species of gastropod

Turridrupa consobrina is a species of sea snail, a marine gastropod mollusk in the family Turridae, the turrids.

== Description ==
The length of the shell varies between 9 mm and 16 mm.

== Distribution ==
This marine species occurs off the Philippines, Hawaii, and Japan.
