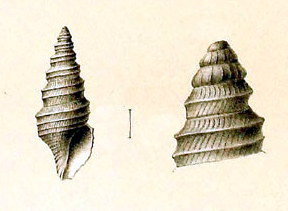
- Drawing of a shell of Drilliola loprestiana

Scientific classification
- Kingdom: Animalia
- Phylum: Mollusca
- Class: Gastropoda
- Subclass: Caenogastropoda
- Order: Neogastropoda
- Superfamily: Conoidea
- Family: Borsoniidae
- Genus: Drilliola
- Species: D. loprestiana

Binomial name
- Drilliola loprestiana (Calcara, 1841)

Synonyms
- Drillia crispata Reeve; Drilliola comatotropis (Dall, 1881); Fusus moniliger Cantraine, F.J., 1835; Microdrillia loprestiana (Calcara, 1841); Pleurotoma comatotropis Dall, 1881; Pleurotoma loprestiana Calcara, 1841; Pleurotoma tarentini Philippi, 1844; Pleurotoma tiara Watson, 1881; Pleurotoma trecchi Testa, D., 1842 (fossil); Pleurotoma tarentini Philippi, R.A., 1844 (fossil); Pleurotoma tricincta Brugnone, 1862; Raphitoma barbierii Brusina, S., 1866; Taranis pulchella Verrill, 1880

= Drilliola loprestiana =

Species of gastropod

Drilliola loprestiana is a species of sea snail, a marine gastropod mollusk in the family Borsoniidae.

== Taxonomy ==
Figueira & Absalão (2010) used the name Drilliola pulchella (Verrill, 1880) for the species generally known as Drilliola loprestiana. They illustrated as "holotype Drilliola loprestiana (Calcara, 1841), MAL-1930, photo courtesy of Museo di Zoologia 'P. Doderlein', Palermo University", a specimen with a paucispiral protoconch, which is Drilliola emendata (Monterosato, 1872). This is questionable, because when establishing the genus Drilliola, Locard (1897: 213) provided notes from Monterosato (who then had purchased the Brugnone collection with Calcara's types), in which Drilliola loprestiana was clearly understood in the current acception (i.e. the species with a brown, multispiral protoconch). Most fortunately, ICZN art. 74.6. does not allow after year 2000 the fixation of a lectotype by inference of a "holotype", so this has no nomenclatural effect.

== Description ==
The size of an adult shell varies between 4 mm and 8.7 mm. The shell contains seven whorls with revolving carinae, the interstices longitudinally striate. The sinus is wide. The color of the shell is whitish, the apex brown-stained.

The shell has a fusiform shape up to 7 mm high, with elevated spire and body whorl less than half the total height. The protoconch is proportionally very large, with 4–5 convex whorls and a sculpture of axial riblets and a marked suprasutural keel. The teleoconch contains 3–4 whorls, with a sculpture of strong, elevated and acute spiral cords, narrower than the interspaces. The axial sculpture consists of fine raised threads which are very conspicuous in the interspaces and attenuated over the cords. The aperture is elongate. The outer lip is simple, with a deep U-shaped sinus situated next to the suture, then with convex profile in lateral view. The columellar edge simple, making an angle with the parietal edge. The colour of the protoconch is dark brown, of the teleoconch pure white.

== Distribution ==
This species occurs from the Bay of Biscay to West Africa, in the Mediterranean Sea, in the Adriatic Sea, in the Atlantic Ocean from Georgia, USA to Southern Brazil, in the Caribbean Sea and in the Gulf of Mexico.
