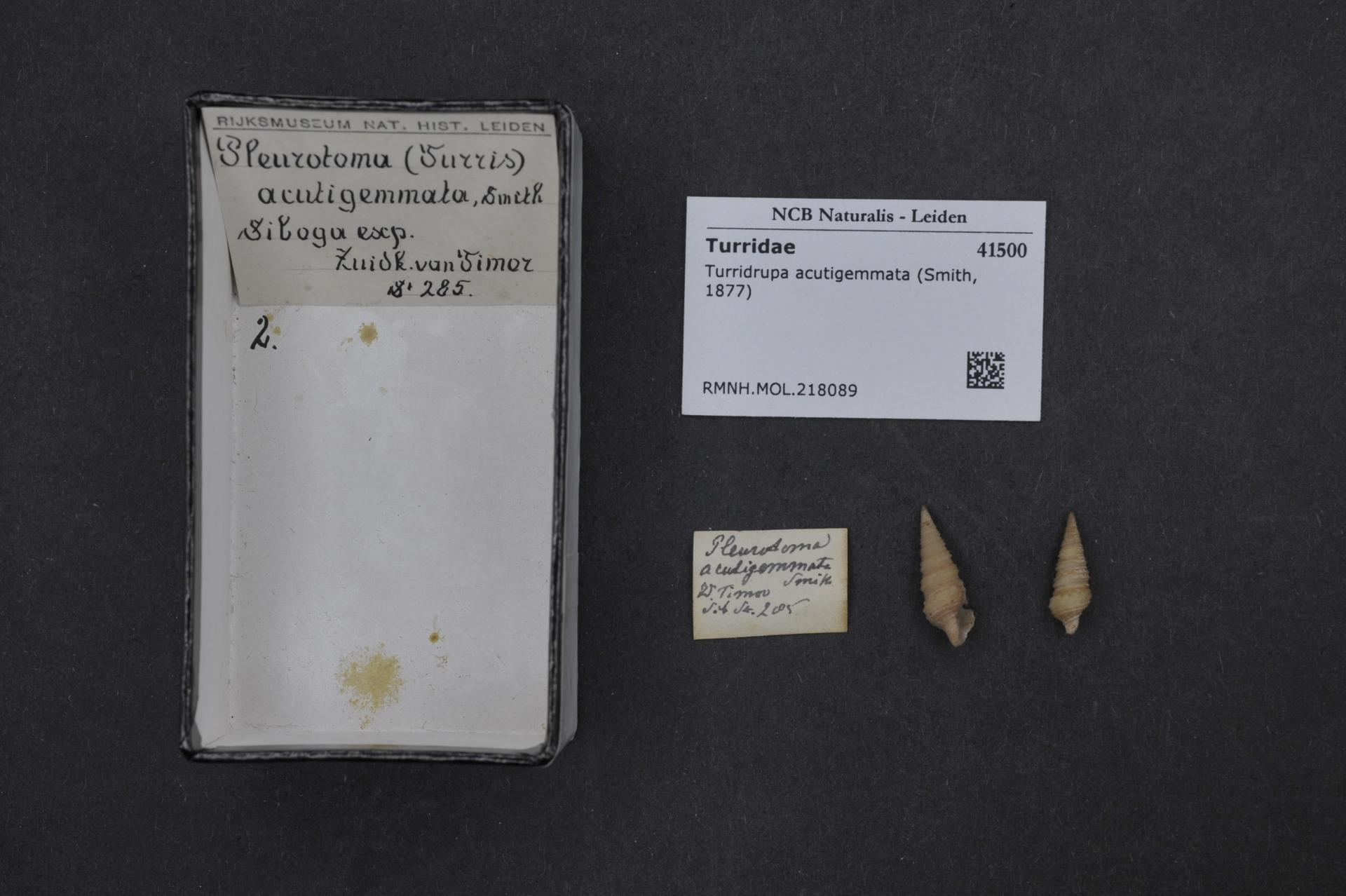
- Shell of Turridrupa acutigemmata (specimen at Naturalis Biodiversity Center)

Scientific classification
- Kingdom: Animalia
- Phylum: Mollusca
- Class: Gastropoda
- Subclass: Caenogastropoda
- Order: Neogastropoda
- Superfamily: Conoidea
- Family: Turridae
- Genus: Turridrupa
- Species: T. acutigemmata

Binomial name
- Turridrupa acutigemmata (E.A. Smith, 1877)

Synonyms
- Pleurotoma (Hemipleurotoma) acutigemmata (E.A. Smith, 1877).; Pleurotoma (Turris) acutigemmata Smith E. A., 1877 (original combination); Pleurotoma acutigemmata var. minor E. A. Smith, 1904; Turris (Tomopleura) acutigemmata (E.A. Smith, 1877).

= Turridrupa acutigemmata =

Species of gastropod

Turridrupa acutigemmata is a species of sea snail, a marine gastropod mollusk in the family Turridae, the turrids.

== Description ==
T. acutigemmata has a medium sized shell for its genus which can reach up to 21.mm in height. It can be recognized by its slender shape, tall spire, uniform coloration and "comparatively few, strong, laterally elliptical gemmules on the sinus cord." Its spire is roughly twice the hight of its aperture, and its spiral whorls are sculptured with three strong cords with a forth emergent or half emergent. It's coloring is "uniform whitish-yellow to reddish-brown, occasionally with light-brown maculation in interspaces of the gemmules."

== Distribution ==
This marine species occurs off South Africa; Mozambique; Sri Lanka, Indonesia, Fiji Islands, Solomon Islands, New Caledonia, Queensland (Australia).
