= Retidrillia pruina =

Scientific classification
- Kingdom: Animalia
- Phylum: Mollusca
- Class: Gastropoda
- Subclass: Caenogastropoda
- Order: Neogastropoda
- Superfamily: Conoidea
- Family: Borsoniidae
- Genus: Retidrillia
- Species: R. pruina

Binomial name
- Retidrillia pruina (Watson, 1881)

Synonyms
- Drilliola pruina (Watson, 1881); Gymnobela tanneri (Verrill and Smith, 1884); Microdrillia pruina (Watson, 1881); Pleurotoma (Thesbia) pruina Watson, 1881 (basionym); Suavodrillia tanneri (Verrill & Smith, 1884); Typhlomangelia tanneri Verrill & Smith, 1884

Species of gastropod

Retidrillia pruina is a species of sea snail, a marine gastropod mollusk in the family Borsoniidae.

== Description ==
The shell grows to a length of 21 mm.

(Original description) The strong shell is white and dark-brown tipped. It has a biconical shape, with a short stout scalar spire, angulated whorls, a roundly contracted marginated suture, and a small body whorl conically narrowed into a small unequal-sided snout.

Sculpture. Longitudinal sculpture—on the earlier whorls there are very small, narrow, oblique ribs originating in a mid-whorl row of tubercles, but on the body whorl the riblets almost disappear. There are fine scratches in the lines of growth. These are peculiarly sharp and regular in the sinus area. Spiral sculpture—the whorls are bisected by a strong angular keel, sparsely, but regularly, set with small round knobs, from which the longitudinal ribs descend.; Below the suture there is a narrow cylindrical collar of two fine contiguous threads. The sinus-area is free of these. But from the keel downwards the surface is covered by fine narrow rounded threads, separated by broader intervals. Near the keel these are crowded. On the point they are wider apart, on the base they are most sparse. Besides these, there is a delicate microscopic fretting.

Colour: porcellaneous white, dead or frosted in the interstices, but pellucid and glossy on the spiral threads. The apex is dark ruddy brown.

The spire is conical, scalar, shortish, blunt. The apex consists of 3½ cylindrically globose rounded whorls separated by a linearly impressed suture. They rise to a flattened top, consisting of fully 1½ whorls, in the midst of which lies the very minute and immersed tip. These whorls are coloured of a deep, rich, translucent, faintly ruddy brown.;The earliest ones, perhaps from rubbing, are glossy, but further on they are crossed by crowded, curved, sharpish, almost microscopic riblets. Between which are finely microscopic spirals whose course is not quite uniform. Whorls 7½ but the shell is probably not quite full-grown. They are of very regular and slow increase, broad and short, each one laps up on the one before it, and is there shortly cylindrical, has then a pretty long, concave, and somewhat horizontal shoulder to the keel, which is right-angled. Below this the whorls are cylindrical with a slight contraction downwards to the inferior suture. The body whorl contracts from the keel downwards, with a convexly conical and very unequally-sided base, produced into a small bluntly pointed snout. The suture is a very shallow rounded furrow defined by the infrasutural collar and the contraction of the whorls. The aperture is angularly pear-shaped, being truncate above and prolonged into the broadish siphonal canal below. The outer lip leaves the body at a right angle, and advances direct to the keel, from which point to the end of the snout it forms almost a straight line. Its edge is at the keel thrown out into a high shoulder, between which and the body lies the shallow, open, rounded sinus, with a narrow triangular shelf between it and the body whorl. The lip-edge is thin throughout. The inner lip is excavated somewhat deeply and flatly into the thickness of the shell, and runs on to the extreme point of the rather short and oblique columella, whose inner edge has a long gradual twist.

== Distribution ==
This species occurs in the Northwest Atlantic Ocean found at depths between 878 m and 2359 m off the Azores and Massachusetts, USA; in the Gulf of Mexico.
