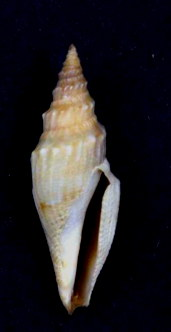
- Apertural view of a shell of Genota papalis (museum specimen at Naturalis Biodiversity Center)

Scientific classification
- Kingdom: Animalia
- Phylum: Mollusca
- Class: Gastropoda
- Subclass: Caenogastropoda
- Order: Neogastropoda
- Superfamily: Conoidea
- Family: Borsoniidae
- Genus: Genota
- Species: G. papalis

Binomial name
- Genota papalis (Reeve, 1843)

Synonyms
- Genotia mitraeformis var. papalis Reeve, 1843; Pleurotoma papalis Reeve, 1843

= Genota papalis =

Species of gastropod

Genota papalis is a species of sea snail, a marine gastropod mollusk in the family Borsoniidae.

== Description ==
The length of the shell varies between 24 mm and 55 mm. The shoulder somewhat flatter than in Genota mitriformis. The nodules are more distinct, as are the longitudinal lines or folds. The revolving sculpture is scarcely decussating them and sometimes becomes obsolete. The shell is sometimes indistinctly banded.

== Distribution ==
This marine species occurs in the Atlantic Ocean off tropical West Africa, Guinea, Senegal.
