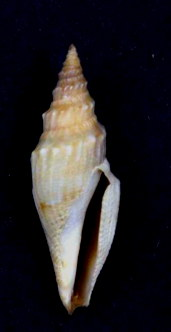
- Apertural view of a shell of Genota papalis

Scientific classification
- Kingdom: Animalia
- Phylum: Mollusca
- Class: Gastropoda
- Subclass: Caenogastropoda
- Order: Neogastropoda
- Superfamily: Conoidea
- Family: Borsoniidae
- Genus: Genota; H. Adams & A. Adams, 1853

Type species
- Murex mitriformis W. Wood, 1828

Synonyms
- Genotia P. Fischer, 1883 (Invalid: unjustified emendation of Genota); Genotia (Genotia) P. Fischer, 1883; Pleurotoma (Genota) H. Adams & A. Adams, 1853; Turris (Genota) H. Adams & A. Adams, 1853 (original rank as subgenus)

= Genota =

Genus of gastropods

Genota is a genus of sea snails, marine gastropod mollusks in the family Borsoniidae.

== Description ==
The shell is narrowly obconic and cancellated. The body whorl gradually tapers to a but slightly developed siphonal canal. The sinus of the lip is wide and shallow. The aperture is long and narrow with subparallel margins. The operculum is unguiculate.

== Species ==
Species within the genus Genota include:

- † Genota bonnanii Bellardi, 1877
- † Genota craverii Bellardi, 1877
- † Genota domenechae Vera-Peláez & Lozano-Francisco, 2001
- † Genota gonzalesi Shuto, 1969
- Genota joleaudi Stchepinsky, 1936
- † Genota jogjacartensis K. Martin, 1914
- † Genota maximei Ceulemans, Van Dingenen & Landau, 2018
- † Genota mayeri Bellardi, 1877
- Genota mitriformis (Wood W., 1828)
- Genota nicklesi Knudsen, 1952
- Genota papalis (Reeve, 1843)
- † Genota proavia Bellardi, 1877
- † Genota pseudoelisae Landau, Harzhauser, İslamoğlu & C. M. Silva, 2013
- † Genota ramosa (Basterot, 1825)
- † Genota valeriae (Hoernes & Auinger, 1891)

Species brought into synonymy

- † Genota lusitaniae Vera-Peláez & Lozano-Francisco, 2001: synonym of † Genota bonnanii Bellardi, 1877 (junior subjective synonym)
- Genota marchadi [sic] : synonym of Genota nicklesi Knudsen, 1952
- Genota marchandi Pin, 1996 : synonym of Genota nicklesi Knudsen, 1952
- Genota mitraeformis (Kiener, 1839) : synonym of Genota mitriformis (Wood W., 1828)
- Genota nigeriensis Vera-Peláez, 2004 : synonym of Genota nicklesi Knudsen, 1952
- Genota vafra Sykes, 1905 : synonym of Genota mitriformis (Wood W., 1828)
