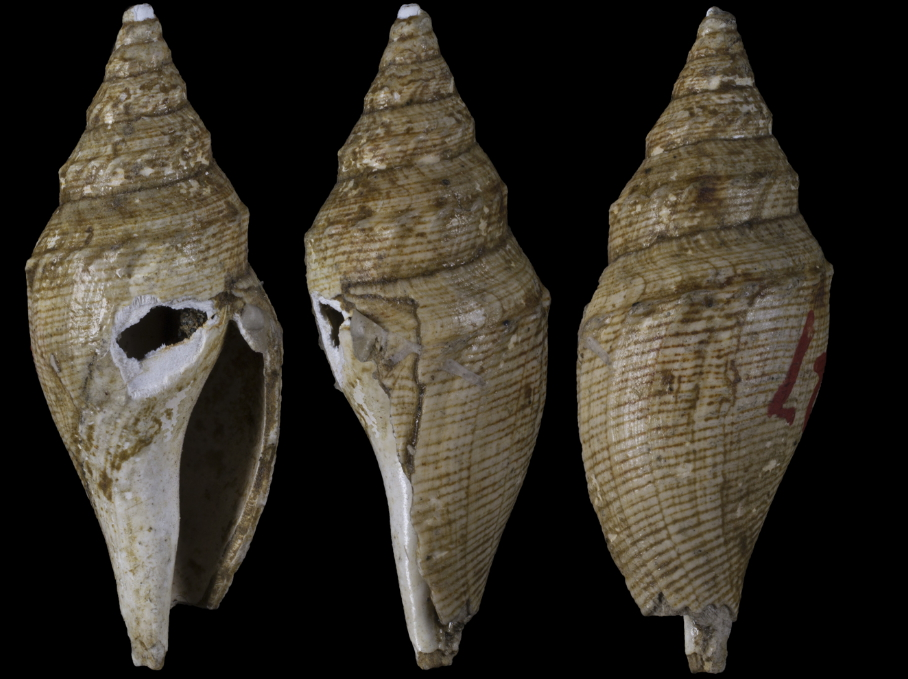
- A shell of † Genota mayeri dignoma

Scientific classification
- Kingdom: Animalia
- Phylum: Mollusca
- Class: Gastropoda
- Subclass: Caenogastropoda
- Order: Neogastropoda
- Superfamily: Conoidea
- Family: Borsoniidae
- Genus: Genota
- Species: G. mayeri

Binomial name
- Genota mayeri Bellardi, 1877

= Genota mayeri =

Species of gastropod

Genota mayeri is an extinct species of sea snail, a marine gastropod mollusk in the family Borsoniidae.

== Subspecies ==
- † Genota mayeri dignoma Fontannes, 1880

== Description ==
The length of the shell attains 28 mm, its diameter is 11 mm.

== Distribution ==
Fossils of this marine species were found in Miocene strata in Piedmont, Italy and in Pliocene strata in Languedoc-Roussillon, France.
