= Genota craverii =

Scientific classification
- Kingdom: Animalia
- Phylum: Mollusca
- Class: Gastropoda
- Subclass: Caenogastropoda
- Order: Neogastropoda
- Superfamily: Conoidea
- Family: Borsoniidae
- Genus: Genota
- Species: G. craverii

Binomial name
- Genota craverii Bellardi, 1877

Species of gastropod

Genota craverii is an extinct species of sea snail, a marine gastropod mollusk in the family Borsoniidae.

== Description ==
The length of the shell attains 58 mm, its diameter is 17 mm.

== Distribution ==
Fossils of this marine species were found in Miocene strata in Piedmont, Italy.
