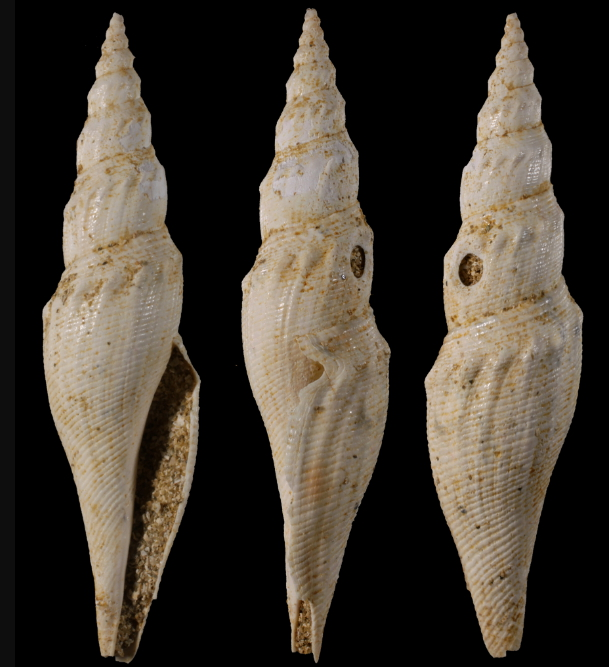
- Shell of † Genota ramosa (specimen at MNHN, Paris)

Scientific classification
- Kingdom: Animalia
- Phylum: Mollusca
- Class: Gastropoda
- Subclass: Caenogastropoda
- Order: Neogastropoda
- Superfamily: Conoidea
- Family: Borsoniidae
- Genus: Genota
- Species: G. ramosa

Binomial name
- Genota ramosa (Basterot, 1825)

Synonyms
- † Pleurotoma ramosa Basterot, 1825 (original combination)

= Genota ramosa =

Species of gastropod

Genota ramosa is an extinct species of sea snail, a marine gastropod mollusk in the family Borsoniidae.

Subspecies

- † Genota ramosa pupoides Csepreghy-Meznerics, 1969 (uncertain > taxon inquirendum)

== Distribution ==
Fossils of this marine species were found in Oligocene strata in Landes, France.
