= Genota bonnanii =

Scientific classification
- Kingdom: Animalia
- Phylum: Mollusca
- Class: Gastropoda
- Subclass: Caenogastropoda
- Order: Neogastropoda
- Superfamily: Conoidea
- Family: Borsoniidae
- Genus: Genota
- Species: G. bonnanii

Binomial name
- Genota bonnanii Bellardi, 1877

Synonyms
- † Genota lusitaniae Vera-Peláez & Lozano-Francisco, 2001 junior subjective synonym

Species of gastropod

Genota bonnanii is an extinct species of sea snail, a marine gastropod mollusk in the family Borsoniidae.

== Description ==
The length of the shell attains 58 mm, its diameter is 15 mm.

== Distribution ==
Fossils of this marine species were found in Miocene strata in Piedmont, Italy.
