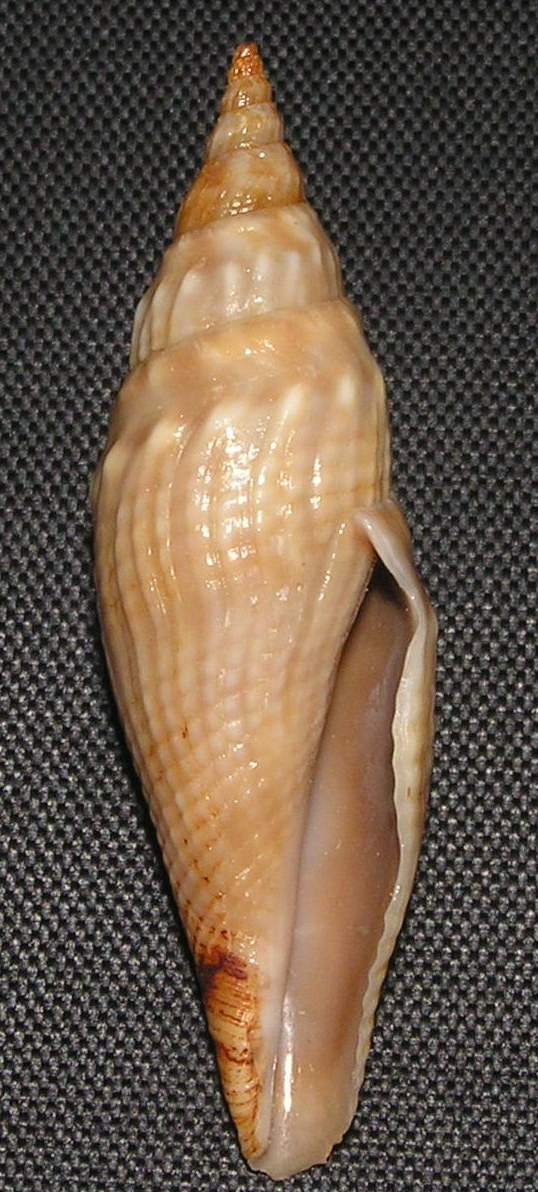
- Apertural view of a shell of Genota nicklesi

Scientific classification
- Kingdom: Animalia
- Phylum: Mollusca
- Class: Gastropoda
- Subclass: Caenogastropoda
- Order: Neogastropoda
- Superfamily: Conoidea
- Family: Borsoniidae
- Genus: Genota
- Species: G. nicklesi

Binomial name
- Genota nicklesi Knudsen, 1952

Synonyms
- Genota marchadi [sic] (misspelling); Genota marchandi Pin, 1996; Genota nigeriensis Vera-Peláez, 2004

= Genota nicklesi =

Species of gastropod

Genota nicklesi is a species of sea snail, a marine gastropod mollusk in the family Borsoniidae.

== Description ==
The shells of most species of sea snails are spirally coiled. The length of the shell varies between 25 mm and 42 mm.

== Distribution ==
This marine species occurs in the Atlantic Ocean off Angola and tropical West Africa
