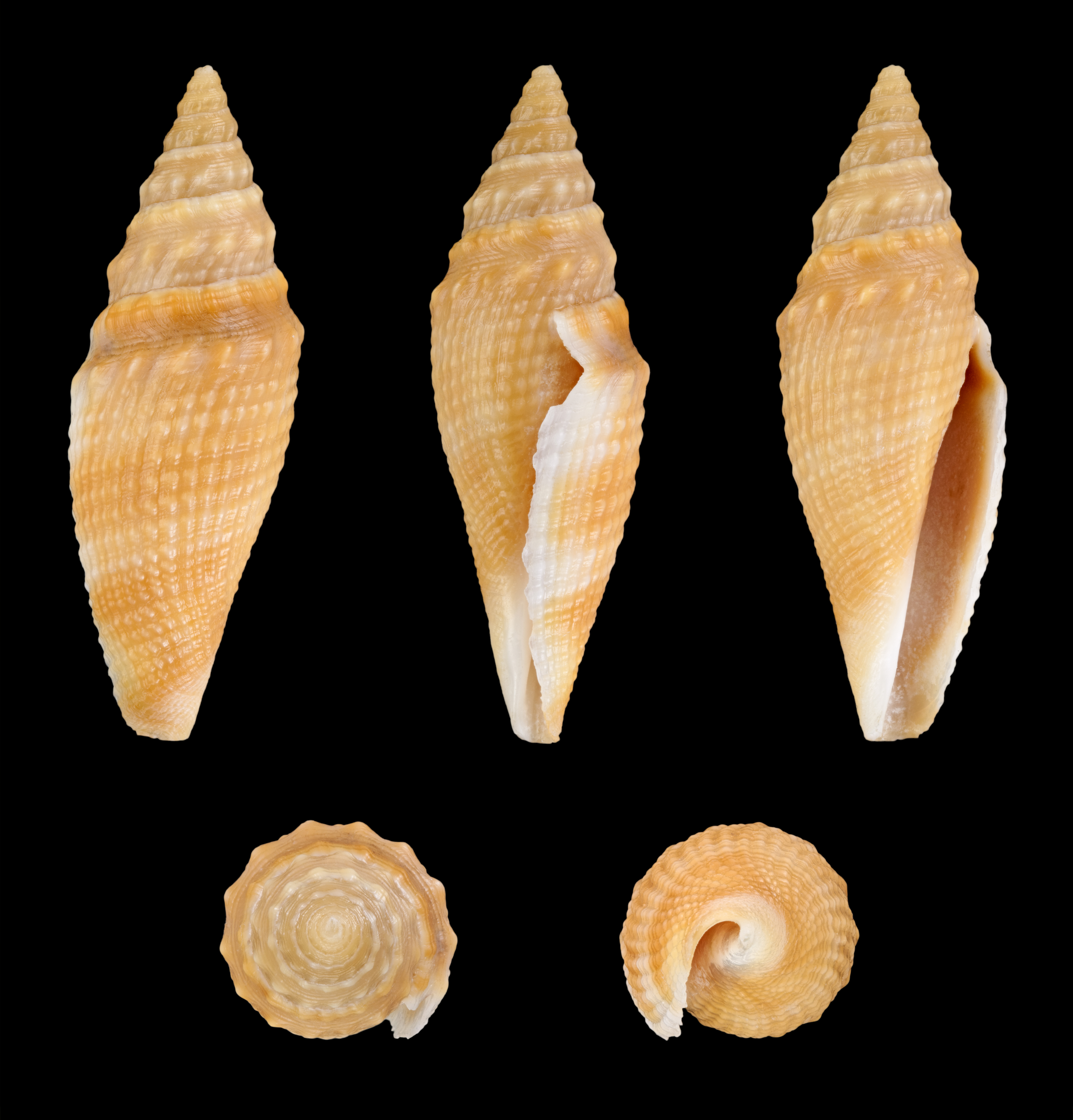
- A shell of Genota mitriformis

Scientific classification
- Kingdom: Animalia
- Phylum: Mollusca
- Class: Gastropoda
- Subclass: Caenogastropoda
- Order: Neogastropoda
- Superfamily: Conoidea
- Family: Borsoniidae
- Genus: Genota
- Species: G. mitriformis

Binomial name
- Genota mitriformis (W. Wood, 1828)

Synonyms
- Genota mitraeformis (Kiener, 1839) (misspelling); Genota vafra Sykes, 1905; Murex mitriformis Wood W., 1828 (original combination); Pleurotoma mitraeformis (W. Wood, 1828)

= Genota mitriformis =

Species of gastropod

Genota mitriformis, common name the mitre-shaped turrid, is a species of sea snail, a marine gastropod mollusk in the family Borsoniidae.

== Description ==
The length of the shell varies between 30 mm and 55 mm. The periphery is noduled. Above it the shoulder is sloping, slightly concave, with revolving lines, lightly marked. Below the periphery it is decussated by close revolving and somewhat curved growth lines. The color of the shell is yellowish or orange-brown.

== Distribution ==
This marine species occurs in the Atlantic Ocean off Angola and West Africa (Gambia, Mauritania and Ivory Coast)
