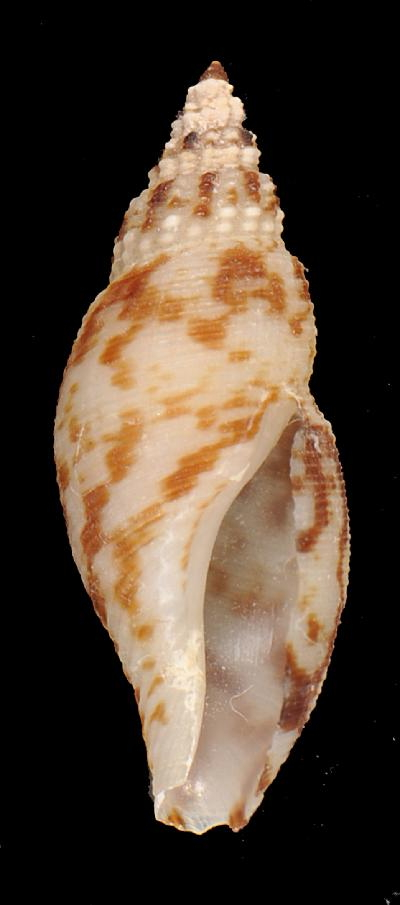
- A lateral view of a shell of Daphnella lymneiformis (type species)

Scientific classification
- Kingdom: Animalia
- Phylum: Mollusca
- Class: Gastropoda
- Subclass: Caenogastropoda
- Order: Neogastropoda
- Superfamily: Conoidea
- Family: Raphitomidae
- Genus: Daphnella; Hinds, 1844

Type species
- Pleurotoma lymneiformis Kiener, 1840

Species
- See text

Synonyms
- Clathurella (Daphnella) Hinds, 1844; Daphnella (Daphnella) Hinds, 1844· accepted, alternate representation; Daphnella (Hemidaphne) Hedley, 1918; Daphnella (Paradaphne) Laseron, 1954· accepted, alternate representation; Eudaphne Bartsch, 1931 (invalid: junior homonym of Eudaphne Reuss, 1922 [Lepidoptera]); Eudaphnella Bartsch, 1933; Hemidaphne Hedley, 1918; Mangilia (Daphnella) Hinds, 1844; Paradaphne Laseron, 1954; Pleurotoma (Daphnella) Hinds, 1844

= Daphnella =

Genus of gastropods

Daphnella is a genus of sea snails, marine gastropod mollusks in the family Raphitomidae.

Not to be confused with Daphnella Baird, 1850, a synonym of Diaphanosoma Fischer, 1850 belonging to the Sididae, a family of ctenopods.

== Description ==
This genus is well characterised by a small, thin shell, elongate-ovate form, a sharp outer lip, the position of the sinus on the line of the advancing suture, and by the reduction of the siphonal canal. The protoconch has a sinusigerid (or diagonally cancellate) structure. The surface is usually striated. The spire is elevated, the body whorl is elongated. The early whorls of the teleoconch show a nodulous sculpture produced by strong axial riblets and strong spiral lirations. These axial riblets disappear on the body whorl, while the spiral lirations remain. The aperture is oblong-oval, slightly channelled in front. The columella is simple. The outer lip is slightly thickened in the adult.

== Species ==
Species within the genus Daphnella include:

- Daphnella allemani (Bartsch, 1931)
- Daphnella angustata (Sowerby III, 1886)
- Daphnella annulata Thiele, 1925
- † Daphnella anteniana K. Martin, 1931
- Daphnella arafurensis (Smith E. A., 1884)
- Daphnella arcta (Smith E. A., 1884)
- Daphnella areolata Stahlschmidt, Poppe & Chino, 2014
- Daphnella aspersa (Gould, 1860)
- Daphnella atractoides Hervier, 1897
- Daphnella aulacoessa (Watson, 1881)
- Daphnella aureola (Reeve, 1845)
- Daphnella axis (Reeve, 1846)
- Daphnella bartschi Dall, 1919
- Daphnella bedoyai (Rolán, Otero-Schmitt & F. Fernandes, 1998)
- † Daphnella bertrandiana (Millet, 1865)
- Daphnella boholensis (Reeve, 1843)
- Daphnella botanica Hedley, 1918
- Daphnella buccinulum Melvill & Standen, 1903 (taxon inquirendum)
- Daphnella butleri (Smith E. A., 1882)
- Daphnella canaliculata Ardovini, 2009
- Daphnella cancellata Hutton, 1878
- Daphnella capensis (G.B. Sowerby III, 1892)
- Daphnella cecilliae Melvill & Standen, 1901
- Daphnella celebensis Schepman, 1913
- Daphnella cheverti Hedley, 1922
- Daphnella cladara Sysoev & Bouchet, 2001
- Daphnella clathrata Gabb, 1865
- Daphnella compsa (Watson, 1881)
- Daphnella concinna (Dunker, 1857)
- Daphnella corbicula (Dall, 1889)
- Daphnella corbula Thiele, 1925
- Daphnella corimbensis (Rolán, Otero-Schmitt & F. Fernandes, 1998)
- Daphnella crebriplicata (Reeve, 1846)
- Daphnella cubana Espinosa & Fernández-Garcés, 1990
- Daphnella curta Pease, 1868 (taxon inquirendum)
- Daphnella dea Melvill, 1904
- † Daphnella defectiva Janse & A. W. Janssen, 1983
- †Daphnella degrangei (Cossmann, 1894)
- Daphnella delicata (Reeve, 1846):
- Daphnella dilecta Sarasúa, 1992
- Daphnella diluta Sowerby III, 1896
- Daphnella effusa Carpenter, 1865
- Daphnella elata Sowerby III, 1893
- † Daphnella eocaenica Cossmann, 1896
- Daphnella eugrammata Dall, 1902
- Daphnella euphrosyne Melvill & Standen, 1903
- Daphnella evergestis Melvill & Standen, 1901
- Daphnella flammea (Hinds, 1843)
- Daphnella floridula Stahlschmidt, Poppe & Chino, 2014
- † Daphnella fragilissima (K. Martin, 1884)
- Daphnella galactosticta Hervier, 1897 (taxon inquirendum)
- † Daphnella gascognensis Lozouet, 2017
- Daphnella gemmulifera McLean & Poorman, 1971
- Daphnella godfroidi (de Folin, 1867)
- Daphnella gracilis Kuroda, 1952
- Daphnella graminea Stahlschmidt, Poppe & Chino, 2014
- † Daphnella groeneveldi Landau, Van Dingenen & Ceulemans, 2020
- Daphnella grundifera (Dall, 1927)
- Daphnella hayesi Nowell-Usticke, 1959
- Daphnella hedya Melvill & Standen, 1903
- Daphnella hyalina (Reeve, 1845)
- Daphnella ichthyandri Sysoev & Ivanov, 1985
- Daphnella inangulata B.-Q. Li & X.-Z. Li, 2014
- Daphnella intercedens (Melvill, 1923)
- Daphnella interrupta Pease, 1860
- Daphnella itonis Sysoev & Bouchet, 2001
- Daphnella janae Stahlschmidt, Poppe & Chino, 2014
- Daphnella jucunda Thiele, 1925
- Daphnella leucophlegma (Dall, 1881)
- Daphnella levicallis Poorman, L., 1983
- Daphnella louisae Jong & Coomans, 1988
- Daphnella lucasii Melvill, 1904
- Daphnella lymneiformis (Kiener, 1840)
- Daphnella lyonsi Espinosa & Fernandez Garces, 1990
- Daphnella magellanica R. A. Philippi, 1868
- Daphnella magnifica Stahlschmidt, Poppe & Chino, 2014
- † Daphnella malacitana (Vera-Peláez, 2002)
- Daphnella marcoaaroni Espinosa, Fernández-Garcés & Ortea, 2020
- Daphnella margaretae Lyons, 1972
- Daphnella marmorata Hinds, 1844
- Daphnella mazatlanica Pilsbry & Lowe, 1932
- Daphnella mitrellaformis (Nomura, 1940)
- Daphnella monocincta Nowell-Usticke, 1969
- Daphnella nobilis Kira, 1959
- Daphnella omaleyi (Melvill, 1899)
- Daphnella ornata Hinds, 1844
- † Daphnella pagera Woodring, 1970
- Daphnella pagodiformis Stahlschmidt, Chino & E. Tardy, 2022
- Daphnella patula (Reeve, 1845)
- Daphnella pernobilis Habe, 1962
- Daphnella pessulata (Reeve, 1843)
- Daphnella phyxelis Barnard, 1964
- Daphnella pluricarinata (Reeve, 1845)
- † Daphnella ponteleviensis Cossmann, 1896
- Daphnella proxima Oyama & Takemura, 1958 (unaccepted - nomen nudum)
- Daphnella pulchrelineata Stahlschmidt, Poppe & Chino, 2014
- Daphnella pulviscula Chino, 2006
- Daphnella radula Pilsbry, 1904
- Daphnella recifensis Barnard, 1958
- Daphnella reeveana (Deshayes, 1863)
- Daphnella reticulosa (Dall, 1889)
- Daphnella retifera (Dall, 1889)
- Daphnella retusa McLean & Poorman, 1971
- Daphnella rissoides (Reeve, 1843)
- † Daphnella romanii (Libass., 1859)
- Daphnella ryukyuensis MacNeil, 1960
- Daphnella sabrina Melvill, 1906
- Daphnella sandwicensis Pease, 1860
- Daphnella scabrata (Smith, 1888)
- Daphnella semivaricosa Habe & Masuda, 1990
- Daphnella sigmastoma Hedley, 1922
- Daphnella sinuata (Carpenter, 1856):
- Daphnella souverbiei (Smith E. A., 1882)
- Daphnella spencerae Sowerby III, 1893 (taxon inquirendum)
- Daphnella stiphra Verco, 1909
- Daphnella supercostata (E. A. Smith, 1882)
- Daphnella tagaroae Stahlschmidt, Poppe & Chino, 2014
- Daphnella tenuiclathrata Smith E.A., 1882
- Daphnella tenuissima Stahlschmidt, Chino & E. Tardy, 2022
- Daphnella terina Melvill & Standen, 1896
- Daphnella terryni Horro, Gori, Rosado & Rolán, 2021
- Daphnella tetartemoris (Melvill, 1910)
- Daphnella thalia Schwengel, 1938
- Daphnella thia Melvill & Standen, 1903 (taxon inquirendum)
- Daphnella thiasotes (Melvill & Standen, 1896)
- Daphnella thygatrica Melvill & Standen, 1903
- Daphnella ticaonica (Reeve, 1845)
- Daphnella tosaensis Habe, 1962
- Daphnella varicosa (Souverbie & Montrozier, 1874)
- Daphnella veneris Melvill & Standen, 1901
- Daphnella vitrea Garrett, 1873 (taxon inquirendum)
- Daphnella wui Chang, 2001
- Daphnella xylois Melvill & Standen, 1901 (taxon inquirendum)

== Species brought into synonymy ==
This is a long list of synonyms
- Daphnella abyssicola (Reeve, 1846): synonym of Eucithara vittata (Hinds, 1843)
- Daphnella acicula Suter, 1908: synonym of Aoteatilia acicula (Suter, 1908) (original combination)
- Daphnella aculeata Webster, 1906: synonym of Asperdaphne aculeata (Webster, 1906): synonym of Pleurotomella aculeata (Webster, 1906) (original combination)
- Daphnella aculeola Hedley, 1915: synonym of Pleurotomella aculeola (Hedley, 1915) (original combination)
- Daphnella alcestis Melvill, 1906: synonym of Austrodaphnella alcestis (Melvill, 1906) (original combination)
- Daphnella alfredensis Bartsch, 1915: synonym of Daphnella capensis (G. B. Sowerby III, 1892)
- †Daphnella ambigua Peyrot, 1931: synonym of †Atoma ambigua (Peyrot, 1931) (original combination)
- Daphnella amphipsila Suter, 1908: synonym of Aoteatilia amphipsila (Suter, 1908) (original combination)
- Daphnella amphitrites Melvill & Standen, 1903: synonym of Taranidaphne amphitrites (Melvill & Standen, 1903) (original combination)
- Daphnella angulata Suter, 1908: synonym of Liratilia conquisita (Suter, 1907)
- Daphnella angulata Habe & Masuda, 1990: synonym of Daphnella sakuraii Stahlschmidt, Chino & E. Tardy, 2022 (invalid: junior homonym of Daphnella angulata Peyrot, 1938; Daphnella sakuraii is a replacement name
- Daphnella antillana Espinosa & Fernández-Garcés, 1990: synonym of Daphnella margaretae Lyons, 1972
- Daphnella antonia (Dall, 1881): synonym of Benthomangelia antonia (Dall, 1881)
- Daphnella arctata Brazier, 1876: synonym of Daphnella sigmastoma Hedley, 1922
- Daphnella arctata Reeve, 1845: synonym of Daphnella sigmastoma Hedley, 1922
- Daphnella areola Reeve, 1845: synonym of Daphnella aureola (Reeve, 1845)
- Daphnella aspera Carpenter, 1864: synonym of Mitromorpha aspera (Carpenter, 1864) (original combination)
- Daphnella atrostyla Tryon, 1884: synonym of Kurtziella atrostyla (Tryon, 1884) (original combination)
- Daphnella aureolata Reeve, 1845: synonym of Daphnella aureola (Reeve, 1845)
- Daphnella bandella (Dall, 1881): synonym of Benthomangelia bandella (Dall, 1881)
- Daphnella barbadensis Nowell-Usticke, 1971: synonym of Daphnella lymneiformis Woodring, 1928
- Daphnella bastowi Gatliff & Gabriel, 1908: synonym of Asperdaphne bastowi (Gatliff & Gabriel, 1908) (original combination)
- Daphnella bathentoma Verco, 1909: synonym of Nepotilla bathentoma (Verco, 1909) (original combination)
- Daphnella bella Pease, 1860: synonym of Macteola interrupta (Reeve, 1846)
- Daphnella bicarinata Pease, 1860: synonym of Eucyclotoma bicarinata (Pease, 1862)
- Daphnella bicolor (Reeve, 1846): synonym of Eucithara bicolor (Reeve, 1846)
- Daphnella bitorquata G. B. Sowerby III, 1896: synonym of Asperdaphne bitorquata (Sowerby III, 1896) (original combination)
- Daphnella bitrudis Barnard, 1963: synonym of Famelica bitrudis (Barnard, 1963) (original combination)
- Daphnella bucklandi Laseron, 1954: synonym of Daphnella botanica Hedley, 1918
- Daphnella cassandra Hedley, 1904: synonym of Aesopus cassandra (Hedley, 1904) (original combination)
- Daphnella casta Hinds, 1844: synonym of Acteon castus (Hinds, 1844) (original combination)
- Daphnella cerina (Kurtz & Stimpson, 1851): synonym of Kurtziella cerina (Kurtz & Stimpson, 1851)
- Daphnella cestrum Hedley, 1922: synonym of Vepridaphne cestrum (Hedley, 1922) (original combination)
- †Daphnella chapplei Powell, 1944: synonym of †Pleurotomella chapplei (Powell, 1944) (original combination)
- Daphnella chariessa Suter, 1908: synonym of Liratilia conquisita (Suter, 1907)
- Daphnella chrysoleuca (Melvill, 1923): synonym of Hemilienardia chrysoleuca (Melvill, 1923)
- †Daphnella clifdenica Laws, 1939: synonym of †Maoridaphne clifdenica (Laws, 1939) (original combination)
- Daphnella conquisita Suter, 1907: synonym of Liratilia conquisita (Suter, 1907) (original combination)
- Daphnella cortezi Dall, 1908 : synonym of Exilia cortezi (Dall, 1908)
- Daphnella crassilirata Suter, 1908: synonym of Minortrophon crassiliratus (Suter, 1908)
- Daphnella crebricostata (Carpenter, 1864): synonym of Mangelia crebricostata Carpenter, 1864
- Daphnella crenulata Pease, 1868: synonym of Otitoma cyclophora (Deshayes, 1863)
- Daphnella cyclophora (Deshayes, 1863): synonym of Otitoma cyclophora (Deshayes, 1863)
- Daphnella cymatodes Hervier, 1897: synonym of Eucyclotoma cymatodes (Hervier, 1897) (original combination)
- Daphnella daphnelloides Reeve, 1845: synonym of Daphnella marmorata Hinds, 1844
- * Daphnella decorata Adams, 1850: synonym of Daphnella lymneiformis Woodring, 1928
- Daphnella deluta Gould, 1860: synonym of Otitoma deluta (Gould, 1860) (original combination)
- Daphnella dentata (Souverbie, 1870): synonym of Daphnella rissoides (Reeve, 1843)
- Daphnella dulcis G. B. Sowerby III, 1896: synonym of Filodrillia dulcis (G. B. Sowerby III, 1896) (original combination)
- Daphnella elegantissima Schepman, 1913: synonym of Asperdaphne elegantissima (Schepman, 1913) (original combination): synonym of Daphnella dilecta Sarasúa, 1992
- Daphnella elegantissima Espinosa & Fernández-Garcés, 1990: synonym of Daphnella dilecta Sarasúa, 1992 (invalid: junior homonym of Daphnella elegantissima Schepman, 1913)
- Daphnella epicharta Melvill & Standen, 1903: synonym of Diaugasma epicharta (Melvill & Standen, 1903) (original combination)
- Daphnella eulimenes Melvill, 1904: synonym of Pleurotomella eulimenes (Melvill, 1904) (original combination)
- Daphnella excavata Gatliff, 1906: synonym of Nepotilla excavata (Gatliff, 1906) (original combination)
- Daphnella fallaciosa G. B. Sowerby III, 1896: synonym of Guraleus fallaciosus (G. B. Sowerby III, 1896) (original combination)
- Daphnella fenestrata Verco, 1909: synonym of Nepotilla fenestrata (Verco, 1909) (original combination)
- Daphnella filosa Carpenter, 1864: synonym of Mitromorpha carpenteri Glibert, 1954 (Secondary junior homonym of Columbella filosa Dujardin, 1837; Mitromorpha carpenteri is a replacement name)
- Daphnella fragilis (Reeve, 1845): synonym of Daphnella interrupta Pease, 1860
- Daphnella fusca (C. B. Adams, 1845): synonym of Pyrgocythara cinctella (Pfeiffer, 1840)
- Daphnella fuscobalteata E. A. Smith, 1879: synonym of Kuroshiodaphne fuscobalteata (E. A. Smith, 1879) (original combination)
- Daphnella fuscoligata Dall, 1871: synonym of Clathromangelia fuscoligata (Dall, 1871) (original combination)
- Daphnella fuscopicta (Sowerby III, 1893): synonym of Crossata fuscopicta (Sowerby III, 1893)
- Daphnella fusiformis Garrett, 1873: synonym of Eucyclotoma fusiformis (Garrett, 1873) (original combination)
- Daphnella goreensis Maltzan, 1883: synonym of Haedropleura septangularis (Montagu, 1803)
- Daphnella gracilior Tryon, 1884: synonym of Mitromorpha gracilior (Tryon, 1884) (original combination)
- † Daphnella gracillima (Tenison Woods, 1877) : synonym of † Teleochilus gracillimus (Tenison Woods, 1877) (original combination)
- Daphnella granata Hedley, 1922: synonym of Taranis granata (Hedley, 1922) (original combination)
- Daphnella harrisoni (Tenison-Woods, 1878): synonym of Parviterebra brazieri (Angas, 1875)
- Daphnella igniflua (Reeve, 1845): synonym of Monostiolum tessellatum (Reeve, 1844)
- Daphnella imparella Dall, 1908: synonym of Xanthodaphne imparella (Dall, 1908) (original combination)
- Daphnella itama Melvill, 1906: synonym of Pleurotomella itama (Melvill, 1906) (original combination)
- †Daphnella kaiparica Laws, 1939: synonym of †Maoridaphne kaiparica (Laws, 1939) (original combination)
- Daphnella kingensis Petterd, 1879: synonym of Antiguraleus kingensis (Petterd, 1879) (original combination)
- †Daphnella lacunosa Hutton, 1885: synonym of †Zenepos lacunosa (Hutton, 1885)
- Daphnella letourneuxiana (Crosse & P. Fischer, 1865): synonym of Turrella letourneuxiana (Crosse & P. Fischer, 1865)
- Daphnella lifouana Hervier, 1897: synonym of Tritonoturris lifouana (Hervier, 1897) (original combination)
- Daphnella lirata (Reeve, 1845): synonym of Otitoma lirata (Reeve, 1845)
- Daphnella lucasii] Melvill, 1904: synonym of Pleurotomella lucasii (Melvill, J.C., 1904)
- Daphnella lyrica (Reeve, 1846): synonym of Gingicithara lyrica (Reeve, 1846)
- Daphnella marmorata Verco, 1909: synonym of Nepotilla marmorata (Verco, 1909) (original combination)
- Daphnella matakuana (E. A. Smith, 1884): synonym of Eucithara delacouriana (Crosse, 1869)
- Daphnella melanitica (Dall in Dall & Simpson, 1901): synonym of Nannodiella melanitica (Dall, 1901)
- Daphnella michaelseni Strebel, 1905: synonym of Thesbia michaelseni (Strebel, 1905) (original combination)
- Daphnella mimica G. B. Sowerby III, 1896: synonym of Nepotilla mimica (G. B. Sowerby III, 1896) (original combination)
- Daphnella minuscula E. A. Smith, 1910: synonym of Mangelia minuscula (E. A. Smith, 1910) (original combination)
- †Daphnella monterosatoi Cipolla, 1914: synonym of †Teretia monterosatoi (Cipolla, 1914)
- †Daphnella multicincta P. Marshall, 1917: synonym of †Marshallaria multicincta (P. Marshall, 1917)
- †Daphnella neozelanica Suter, 1917: synonym of †Marshallena neozelanica (Suter, 1917) (original combination)
- Daphnella nereidum Melvill & Standen, 1903: synonym of Taranidaphne nereidum (Melvill & Standen, 1903) (original combination)
- Daphnella olyra (Reeve, 1845): synonym of Diaugasma olyra (Reeve, 1845)
- †Daphnella ovata P. Marshall, 1917: synonym of †Marshallaria multicincta (P. Marshall, 1917)
- Daphnella pagoda May, 1911: synonym of Eucithara pagoda (May, 1911) (original combination)
- Daphnella panamica Pilsbry & Lowe, 1932: synonym of Daphnella mazatlanica Pilsbry & Lowe, 1932
- Daphnella payeni Rochebrune & Mabille, 1885: synonym of Typhlodaphne payeni (Rochebrune & Mabille, 1885) (original combination)
- Daphnella perfragilis Schepman, 1913: synonym of Isodaphne perfragilis (Schepman, 1913) (original combination)
- Daphnella peripla (Dall, 1881): synonym of Gymnobela chyta (R. B. Watson, 1881)
- Daphnella perplexa Verco, 1909: synonym of Asperdaphne perplexa (Verco, 1909) (original combination)
- Daphnella philippiana Dunker, 1871: synonym of Daphnella delicata (Reeve, 1846)
- Daphnella pilsbryi Kuroda, 1947: synonym of Daphnella interrupta Pease, 1860
- Daphnella pompholyx (Dall, 1889): synonym of Xanthodaphne pompholyx (Dall, 1889)
- †Daphnella protensa Hutton, 1885: synonym of †Neoguraleus protensus (Hutton, 1885)
- † Daphnella pseudoconcinna (Ceulemans, Van Dingenen & Landau, 2018): synonym of †Leufroyia pseudoconcinna (Ceulemans, Van Dingenen & Landau, 2018)
- Daphnella psila Suter, 1908: synonym of Aoteatilia psila (Suter, 1908) (original combination)
- † Daphnella pulchra Peyrot, 1932: synonym of † Raphitoma pulchra (Peyrot, 1931)
- Daphnella receptoria Melvill & Standen, 1901: synonym of Clathurina receptoria (Melvill & Standen, 1901)
- Daphnella reticulatus Dall, 1889: synonym of Daphnella reticulosa (Dall, 1889)
- Daphnella sagena Dall, 1927: synonym of Mangelia sagena (Dall, 1927) (original combination)
- † Daphnella salinasi (Calc., 1841): synonym of †Gymnobela salinasi (Calcara, 1841)
- Daphnella sandwichensis Pease, 1860: synonym of Daphnella sandwicensis Pease, 1860
- Daphnella saturata (Reeve, 1845): synonym of Kuroshiodaphne saturata (Reeve, 1845)
- Daphnella scalaris Møller, 1842: synonym of Daphnella nobilis Kira, 1959
- Daphnella sofia Dall, 1889: synonym of Xanthodaphne sofia (Dall, 1889)
- Daphnella stegeri McGinty, 1955: synonym of Eucyclotoma stegeri (McGinty, 1955) (original combination)
- Daphnella substriata Suter, 1899: synonym of Aoteatilia substriata (Suter, 1899) (original combination)
- Daphnella subula Brazier, J. 1876: synonym of Daphnella axis (Reeve, 1846)
- Daphnella subuloides Schepman, 1913: synonym of Euclathurella subuloides (Schepman, 1913) (original combination)
- Daphnella subzonata E. A. Smith, 1879: synonym of Asperdaphne subzonata (E. A. Smith, 1879) (original combination)
- Daphnella suluensis Schepman, 1913: synonym of Asperdaphne suluensis (Schepman, 1913) (original combination)
- Daphnella supracancellata Schepman, 1913: synonym of Kuroshiodaphne supracancellata (Schepman, 1913) (original combination)
- Daphnella tasmanica Tenison Woods, 1877: synonym of Asperdaphne tasmanica (Tenison Woods, 1877) (original combination)
- Daphnella tenella E.A. Smith, 1882: synonym of Pleurotoma clymene Dall, 1918
- Daphnella tenuistriata Suter, 1908: synonym of Aoteatilia tenuistriata (Suter, 1908) (original combination)
- Daphnella thalia Schwabe, E., 1939: synonym of Daphnella allemani (Bartsch, 1931)
- Daphnella thespesia Melvill & Standen, 1896: synonym of Kermia thespesia (Melvill & Standen, 1896) (original combination)
- Daphnella totolirata Suter, 1908: synonym of Zenepos totolirata (Suter, 1908) (original combination)
- Daphnella triseriata Verco, 1909: synonym of Nepotilla triseriata (Verco, 1909) (original combination)
- Daphnella trivaricosa Martens, 1880: synonym of Eucyclotoma trivaricosa (Martens, 1880) (original combination)
- Daphnella trizonata (E. A. Smith, 1882): synonym of Neoguraleus trizonata (E. A. Smith, 1882)
- Daphnella varicifera Pease, 1868: synonym of Eucyclotoma varicifera (Pease, 1868)
- †Daphnella varicostata P. Marshall & Murdoch, 1921: synonym of †Rugobela canaliculata (Suter, 1917)
- Daphnella varix Tenison Woods, 1877: synonym of Marita compta (A. Adams & Angas, 1864)
- Daphnella vercoi G. B. Sowerby III, 1896: synonym of Pleurotomella vercoi (G. B. Sowerby III, 1896)
- Daphnella verecunda Barnard, 1963: synonym of Gymnobela verecunda (Barnard, 1963)
- Daphnella versivestita Hedley, 1912: synonym of Asperdaphne versivestita (Hedley, 1912)
- Daphnella vestalis Hedley, 1903: synonym of Asperdaphne vestalis (Hedley, 1903)
- Daphnella vincentina Crosse & Fischer, 1865: synonym of Guraleus pictus vincentinus (Crosse & Fischer, 1835)
