= Terina =

Terina may refer to:

- Terina (ancient city), ancient Greek city in Calabria
- Terina (moth), genus of moths
- Terina (brand), brand name used by the Norwegian meat processing company Nortura
- Daphnella terina, species of sea snail
- Terina Te Tamaki (born 1997), New Zealand female rugby union player
