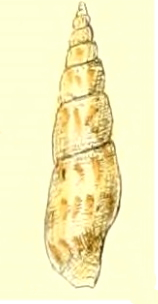
- Original image of a shell of Daphnella delicata

Scientific classification
- Kingdom: Animalia
- Phylum: Mollusca
- Class: Gastropoda
- Subclass: Caenogastropoda
- Order: Neogastropoda
- Superfamily: Conoidea
- Family: Raphitomidae
- Genus: Daphnella
- Species: D. delicata

Binomial name
- Daphnella delicata (Reeve, 1846)

Synonyms
- Daphnella philippiana Dunker, R.W., 1871; Daphnella (Daphnella) delicata (Reeve, 1846); Pleurotoma delicata Reeve, 1846 (original combination)

= Daphnella delicata =

Species of gastropod

Daphnella delicata, common name the delicate pleurotoma, is a species of sea snail, a marine gastropod mollusk in the family Raphitomidae.

== Description ==
The subulate, elongated shell is thin and hyaline. It is transversely minutely and very closely striated. The aperture is short. The color of the shell is transparent white, very palely spotted with orange.

== Distribution ==
This marine species occurs off the Tuamotu, Tahiti and Samoa
