= Daphnella wui =

Scientific classification
- Kingdom: Animalia
- Phylum: Mollusca
- Class: Gastropoda
- Subclass: Caenogastropoda
- Order: Neogastropoda
- Superfamily: Conoidea
- Family: Raphitomidae
- Genus: Daphnella
- Species: D. wui

Binomial name
- Daphnella wui Chang, 2001

Species of gastropod

Daphnella wui is a species of sea snail, a marine gastropod mollusc in the family Raphitomidae.

== Distribution ==
This marine species occurs off Taiwan.
