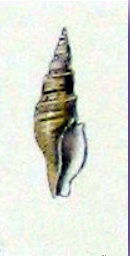
- Original image of a shell of Daphnella axis

Scientific classification
- Kingdom: Animalia
- Phylum: Mollusca
- Class: Gastropoda
- Subclass: Caenogastropoda
- Order: Neogastropoda
- Superfamily: Conoidea
- Family: Raphitomidae
- Genus: Daphnella
- Species: D. axis

Binomial name
- Daphnella axis (Reeve, 1846)

Synonyms
- Clathurella axis (Reeve, 1846); Daphnella subula Brazier, J. 1876 (not Pleurotoma subula Reeve, 1845); Daphnella (Hemidaphne) axis (Reeve, 1846); Pleurotoma axis Reeve, 1846

= Daphnella axis =

Species of gastropod

Daphnella axis, common name the axle pleuratoma, is a species of sea snail, a marine gastropod mollusk in the family Raphitomidae.

== Description ==
(Original description) The shell is straightly acuminate and contracted at the upper part. The whorls show two keels round the upper part. They are transversely faintly ridged beneath. The aperture is oblong. The sinus, which is formed between the two keels, is unusually deep. The color of the shell is whitish, somewhat indistinctly stained with orange-brown.

== Distribution ==
This marine species occurs off the Philippines, in the Gulf of Oman and in the Gulf of Carpentaria - Queensland, Australia
