= Daphnella pagera =

Scientific classification
- Kingdom: Animalia
- Phylum: Mollusca
- Class: Gastropoda
- Subclass: Caenogastropoda
- Order: Neogastropoda
- Superfamily: Conoidea
- Family: Raphitomidae
- Genus: Daphnella
- Species: D. pagera

Binomial name
- Daphnella pagera Woodring, 1970

Extinct species of gastropod

Daphnella pagera is an extinct species of sea snail, a marine gastropod mollusc in the family Raphitomidae.

== Description ==
The length of the shell attains 12.3 mm, its diameter 4.7 mm.

It is described by W.P. Woodring as

Of medium size, slender, pillar constricted. Early protoconch whorls missing, last whorl of small diameter, bearing diagonally cancellate sculpture. First postprotoconch whorl sculptured with 9 narrow axial ribs, overridden by 2 peripheral spiral threads; other narrower threads gradually added. On succeeding whorls axial ribs moderately strong to end of penult whorl, disappearing on body whorl; 13 on penult whorl. Three widely spaced primary spiral threads on penult whorl, upper two stronger than other, and many secondary threads, all strongly frosted by fine axial threads. Secondary spiral threads and slightly arcuate, protractive axial threads on anal fascicle. Outer lip broken back. As shown by axial threads, anal sinus narrow, shaped like a reclining L. Aperture relatively narrow, siphonal canal short, narrow, not notched, according to growth threads. Siphonal fascicle slightly inflated, sculptured with slightly frosted, closely spaced spiral threads.

== Distribution ==
Fossils of this marine species were found in Miocene strata in Panama; age range: 11.608 to 7.246 Ma. The type fossil, and only specimen when documented by Woodring in 1970, was collected from the upper part of the Gatun formation in 1895.
