= Daphnella gracilis =

Scientific classification
- Kingdom: Animalia
- Phylum: Mollusca
- Class: Gastropoda
- Subclass: Caenogastropoda
- Order: Neogastropoda
- Superfamily: Conoidea
- Family: Raphitomidae
- Genus: Daphnella
- Species: D. gracilis

Binomial name
- Daphnella gracilis Kuroda, 1952

Species of gastropod

Daphnella gracilis is a species of sea snail, a marine gastropod mollusk in the family Raphitomidae.

== Description ==
The length of the shell attains 36.8 mm.

== Distribution ==
This marine species occurs in the East China Sea.
