= Daphnella pernobilis =

Scientific classification
- Kingdom: Animalia
- Phylum: Mollusca
- Class: Gastropoda
- Subclass: Caenogastropoda
- Order: Neogastropoda
- Superfamily: Conoidea
- Family: Raphitomidae
- Genus: Daphnella
- Species: D. pernobilis

Binomial name
- Daphnella pernobilis Habe, 1962

Synonyms
- Daphnella (Daphnella) pernobilis Kuroda, T. & T. Habe in Habe, T., 1962

Species of gastropod

Daphnella pernobilis is a species of sea snail, a marine gastropod mollusk in the family Raphitomidae.

== Description ==
The length of the shell attains 17 mm.

== Distribution ==
This marine species is found in the Northwest Pacific Ocean off the coast of Japan.
