= Daphnella monocincta =

Scientific classification
- Kingdom: Animalia
- Phylum: Mollusca
- Class: Gastropoda
- Subclass: Caenogastropoda
- Order: Neogastropoda
- Superfamily: Conoidea
- Family: Raphitomidae
- Genus: Daphnella
- Species: D. monocincta

Binomial name
- Daphnella monocincta Nowell-Usticke, 1969

Species of gastropod

Daphnella monocincta is a species of sea snail, a marine gastropod mollusc in the family Raphitomidae.

This species is considered by J. Tucker as a synonym of the variety Eucyclotoma stegeri monocincta Nowell-Usticke, G.W., 1969

== Distribution ==
This marine species occurs in the Caribbean Sea off Antigua.
