= Daphnella tenuiclathrata =

Scientific classification
- Kingdom: Animalia
- Phylum: Mollusca
- Class: Gastropoda
- Subclass: Caenogastropoda
- Order: Neogastropoda
- Superfamily: Conoidea
- Family: Raphitomidae
- Genus: Daphnella
- Species: D. tenuiclathrata

Binomial name
- Daphnella tenuiclathrata (E. A. Smith, 1882)

Synonyms
- Pleurotoma (Daphnella) tenuiclathrata E. A. Smith, 1882 (original combination)

Species of gastropod

Daphnella tenuiclathrata is a species of sea snail, a marine gastropod mollusk in the family Raphitomidae.

== Description ==
The length of the shell attains 14 mm, its diameter 5 mm.

The small, ovate shell is semi-translucent with very dilute golden yellow spots. It consists of about 9 whorls, of which three in the protoconch. The spiral lirations are very numerous and beautifully minutely beaded. The aperture measures about half the total length of the shell. The outer lip is thin. It is deeply sinuate at the suture. The columella is wrinkled. The siphonal canal is short.
