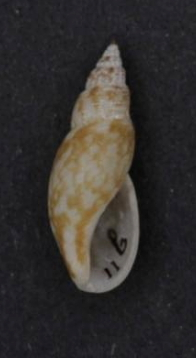
- Shell of Daphnella patula (specimen at Naturalis Biodiversity Center)

Scientific classification
- Kingdom: Animalia
- Phylum: Mollusca
- Class: Gastropoda
- Subclass: Caenogastropoda
- Order: Neogastropoda
- Superfamily: Conoidea
- Family: Raphitomidae
- Genus: Daphnella
- Species: D. patula

Binomial name
- Daphnella patula (Reeve, 1845)

Synonyms
- Daphnella (Daphnella) patula (Reeve, 1845); Pleurotoma patula Reeve, 1845

= Daphnella patula =

Species of gastropod

Daphnella patula is a species of sea snail, a marine gastropod mollusk in the family Raphitomidae.

== Description ==
This species has a shorter spire than Daphnella lymneiformis. It has a low beaded keel just below the suture but it persists through the adult stage.

== Distribution ==
This marine species occurs off the Philippines.
