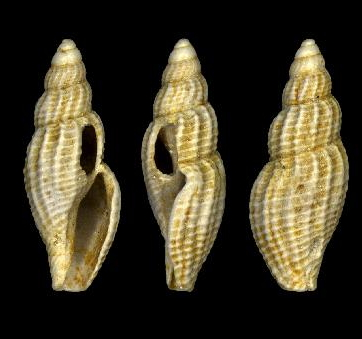
- Shell of † Daphnella eocaenica (specimen at MNHN, Paris)

Scientific classification
- Kingdom: Animalia
- Phylum: Mollusca
- Class: Gastropoda
- Subclass: Caenogastropoda
- Order: Neogastropoda
- Superfamily: Conoidea
- Family: Raphitomidae
- Genus: Daphnella
- Species: D. eocaenica

Binomial name
- Daphnella eocaenica Cossmann, 1896

= Daphnella eocaenica =

Extinct species of gastropod

Daphnella eocaenica is an extinct species of sea snail, a marine gastropod mollusk in the family Raphitomidae.

== Distribution ==
Fossils of this marine species were found in Eocene strata of Loire-Atlantique, France.
