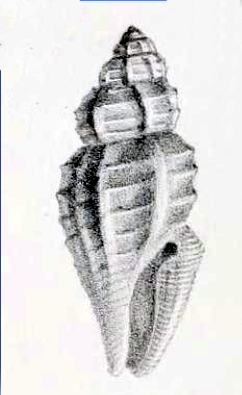
- Original image of a shell of Daphnella godfroidi

Scientific classification
- Kingdom: Animalia
- Phylum: Mollusca
- Class: Gastropoda
- Subclass: Caenogastropoda
- Order: Neogastropoda
- Superfamily: Conoidea
- Family: Raphitomidae
- Genus: Daphnella
- Species: D. godfroidi

Binomial name
- Daphnella godfroidi de Folin, 1867

= Daphnella godfroidi =

Species of gastropod

Daphnella godfroidi is a species of sea snail, a marine gastropod mollusk in the family Raphitomidae.

== Description ==
The length of the shell attains 4 mm, its diameter 1.3 mm.

The dark brown, ovate-elongate shell has a fusiform shape. The apex is obtuse. The shell contains six whorls. The large body whorl measures 5/8 of the total length. The suture is narrow. The sculpture is composed of a few longitudinal ribs and spiral lirae. The ribs are larger at their base and become very thin at their top. The very short siphonal canal is wide. The aperture is elongated and narrow. The columella is almost straight.
