= Daphnella proxima =

Scientific classification
- Kingdom: Animalia
- Phylum: Mollusca
- Class: Gastropoda
- Subclass: Caenogastropoda
- Order: Neogastropoda
- Superfamily: Conoidea
- Family: Raphitomidae
- Genus: Daphnella
- Species: D. proxima

Binomial name
- Daphnella proxima K. Oyama & Y. Takemura, 1958

Synonyms
- Daphnella (Daphnella) proxima K. Oyama & Y. Takemura, 1958

Species of gastropod

Daphnella proxima is a species of sea snail, a marine gastropod mollusk in the family Raphitomidae.

This name is unaccepted as a nomen nudum

== Description ==
The length of this shell attains 38 mm. The shell is a long spiral.

== Distribution ==
This marine species occurs in the East China Sea. They have been found along the Japanese coast in places like Okinawa.
