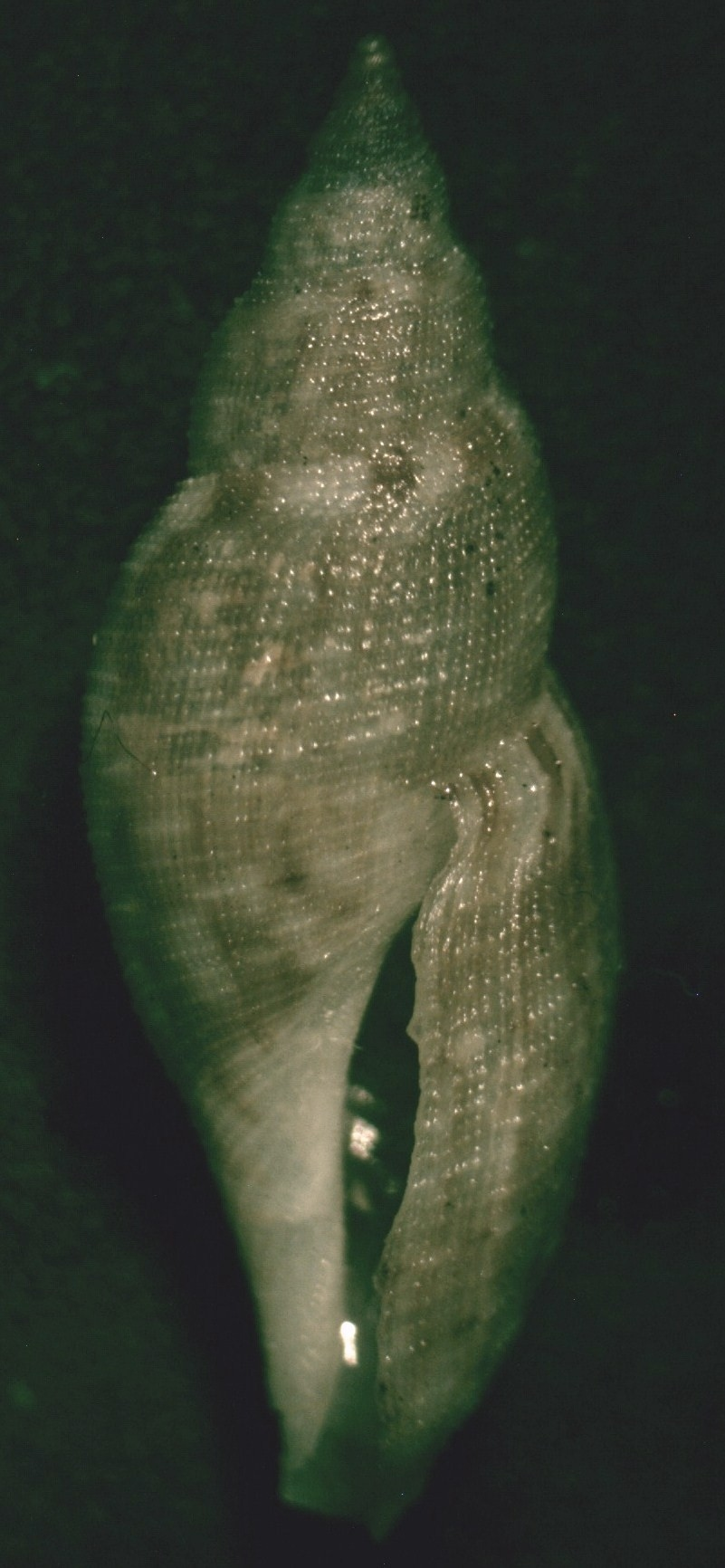
- Shell of Daphnella radula

Scientific classification
- Kingdom: Animalia
- Phylum: Mollusca
- Class: Gastropoda
- Subclass: Caenogastropoda
- Order: Neogastropoda
- Superfamily: Conoidea
- Family: Raphitomidae
- Genus: Daphnella
- Species: D. radula

Binomial name
- Daphnella radula Pilsbry, 1904

= Daphnella radula =

Species of gastropod

Daphnella radula is a species of sea snail, a marine gastropod mollusk in the family Raphitomidae.

== Description ==
The length of the shell attains 13.5 mm, its diameter 5 mm.

(Original description) The fusiform shell is rather solid. It is pale brown, indistinctly mottled with white and marked with short brown lines on the larger spiral cords, a series of alternately white and brown squarish spots below the suture. The surface is sharply sculptured with alternate spiral cords and threads, about 52 in all on the body whorl, intersected by fine raised longitudinal threads, prominent where they cross the spirals. The lower edge of the anal fasciole is defined by a sulcus slightly unlike the other intervals, where the growth lines bend abruptly backward. The shell contains 8 whorls, the first two brown, with the usual diagonally intersecting grooves of Daphnella, the next whorl with three spirals. The body whorl is long, tapering above and below. The aperture measures more than half the shell's length. The outer lip is thick but beveled to an edge, obliquely and deeply excised above, a little sinuated near the base. The siphonal canal is short and rather shallow.

== Distribution ==
This marine species occurs off Japan.

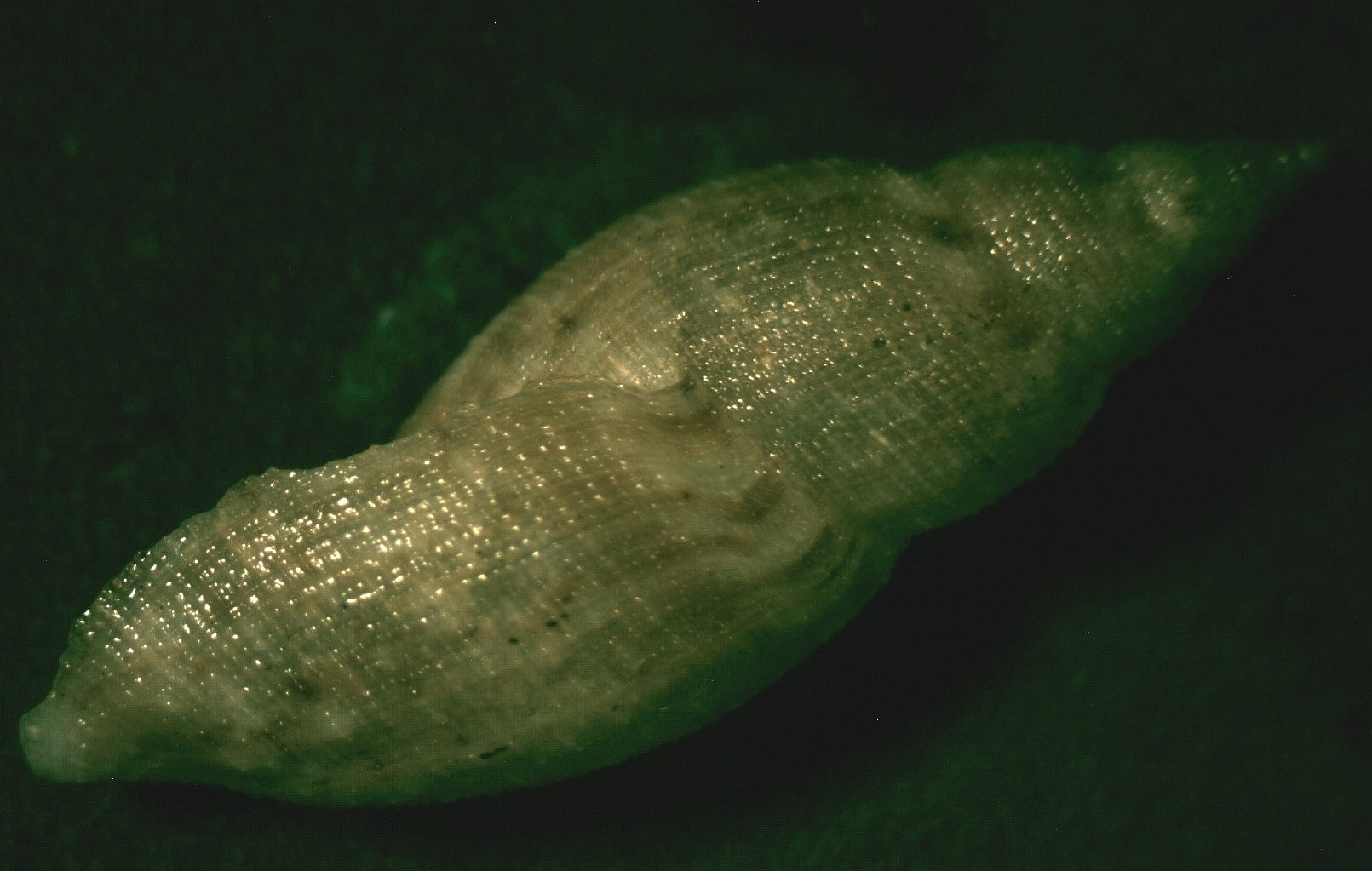
Daphnella radula, abapertural view
