= Daphnella souverbiei =

Scientific classification
- Kingdom: Animalia
- Phylum: Mollusca
- Class: Gastropoda
- Subclass: Caenogastropoda
- Order: Neogastropoda
- Superfamily: Conoidea
- Family: Raphitomidae
- Genus: Daphnella
- Species: D. souverbiei

Binomial name
- Daphnella souverbiei (E.A. Smith, 1882)

Synonyms
- Daphnella (Hemidaphne) souverbiei (E.A. Smith, 1882); Pleurotoma (Daphnella) souverbiei E.A. Smith, 1882

Species of gastropod

Daphnella souverbiei is a species of sea snail, a marine gastropod mollusk in the family Raphitomidae.

== Description ==
The length of the shell attains 19 mm, its diameter 7 mm.

The elongate-ovate shell contains about nine whorls of which three in the protoconch. The aperture is large, measuring 9/19 of the total length. The outer lip is slightly incrassate, dentate at its margin and sinuate below the suture. The siphonal canal is very short, hardly recurved and slightly oblique.

It has a considerable likeness to Daphnella rissoides (Reeve, 1843), but it is very different in several respects. The proportion of the body whorl to the entire shell is much larger in the present species, occupying nearly two thirds of the entire length, whereas in P. rissoides it only extends to a little more than half of it. The spiral striation, the less convex whorls, and the absence of coloration at the apex are the characters by which this species may be known.

== Distribution ==
This marine species is endemic to Australia and occurs off Queensland and Western Australia.
