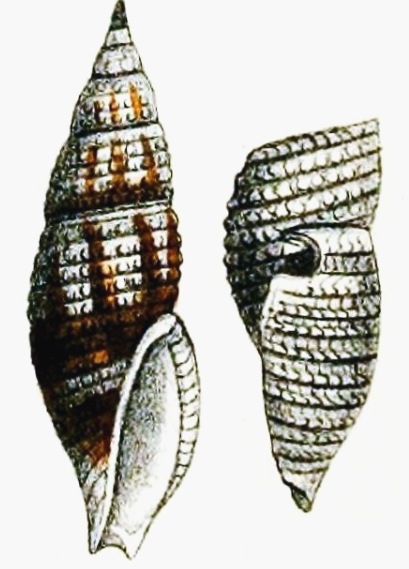
- Original image of a shell of Daphnella atractoides

Scientific classification
- Kingdom: Animalia
- Phylum: Mollusca
- Class: Gastropoda
- Subclass: Caenogastropoda
- Order: Neogastropoda
- Superfamily: Conoidea
- Family: Raphitomidae
- Genus: Daphnella
- Species: D. atractoides

Binomial name
- Daphnella atractoides Hervier, 1897

= Daphnella atractoides =

Species of gastropod

Daphnella atractoides is a species of sea snail, a marine gastropod mollusk in the family Raphitomidae.

== Description ==
The length of the shell varies between 5.5 mm and 10 mm.

== Distribution ==
This marine species occurs off Taiwan, New Caledonia and the Fiji Islands.
