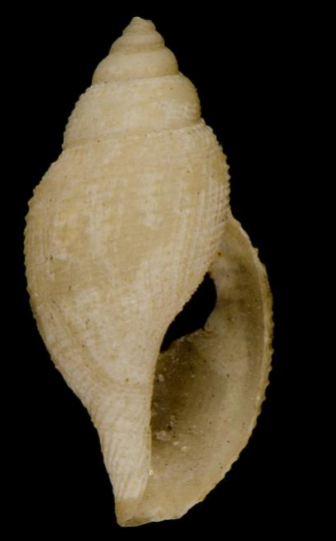
- Shell of Daphnella retifera (syntype at the Smithsonian Institution)

Scientific classification
- Kingdom: Animalia
- Phylum: Mollusca
- Class: Gastropoda
- Subclass: Caenogastropoda
- Order: Neogastropoda
- Superfamily: Conoidea
- Family: Raphitomidae
- Genus: Daphnella
- Species: D. retifera

Binomial name
- Daphnella retifera (Dall, 1889)

Synonyms
- Mangilia retifera Dall, 1889

= Daphnella retifera =

Species of gastropod

Daphnella retifera is a species of sea snail, a marine gastropod mollusk in the family Raphitomidae.

== Description ==
The length of the shell varies between 7 mm and 14 mm.

(Original description) The small, thin shell is oval and short-spired. It is yellowish with pale cloudy markings of brownish. The protoconch has a sinusigerid (or diagonally cancellate) structure to begin with, but not strongly sculptured, and the larval shell after 2½ turns of the usual sort becomes smooth and continues for 2½ whorls more, quite smooth and rounded, before the normal sculpture begins. The latter continues in the largest specimen for 2½ turns more. The whorls moderately rounded. The fasciole is hardly discernible except by following the incremental lines. It is sculptured like the rest, and not excavated. The suture is distinct. The sculpture is composed of numerous tine sharp spiral threads with slightly wider interspaces, crossed by somewhat less prominent transverse threads, making a very regular reticulation over the whole surface. At most of the intersections a small point elevates itself, giving a peculiarly rasp-like appearance to the dull unpolished surface of the shell. The notch is shallow, situated at the suture. The aperture is pointed behind. The outer lip is arched well forward, hardly contracted for the broad short siphonal canal. The edge is thin, the interior not lirate. The columella is not callous, nearly straight, simple, very slightly recurved at the end of the siphonal canal.

== Distribution ==
Daphnella retifera can be found in Atlantic waters, ranging from the coast of North Carolina south to Brazil.; also in the Gulf of Mexico.
