= Daphnella lyonsi =

Scientific classification
- Kingdom: Animalia
- Phylum: Mollusca
- Class: Gastropoda
- Subclass: Caenogastropoda
- Order: Neogastropoda
- Superfamily: Conoidea
- Family: Raphitomidae
- Genus: Daphnella
- Species: D. lyonsi

Binomial name
- Daphnella lyonsi Espinosa & Fernandez Garces, 1990

Synonyms
- Daphnella (Daphnella) lyonsi Espinosa & Fernández-Garcés, 1990· accepted, alternate representation

Species of gastropod

Daphnella lyonsi, common name the sieve daphnella, is a species of sea snail, a marine gastropod mollusk in the family Raphitomidae.

== Description ==
The length of the shell attains 11 mm.

== Distribution ==
This species occurs in the Caribbean Sea off Cuba and the Virgin Islands.
