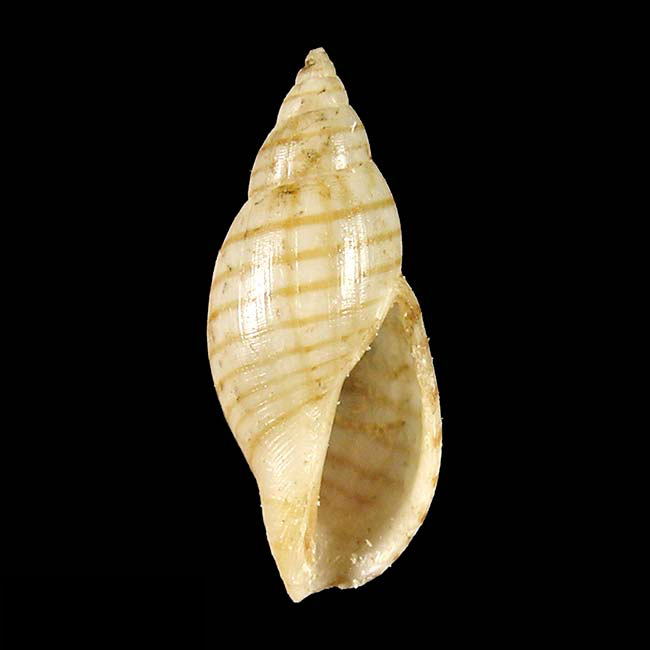
- Shell of Daphnella pulchrelineata

Scientific classification
- Kingdom: Animalia
- Phylum: Mollusca
- Class: Gastropoda
- Subclass: Caenogastropoda
- Order: Neogastropoda
- Superfamily: Conoidea
- Family: Raphitomidae
- Genus: Daphnella
- Species: D. pulchrelineata

Binomial name
- Daphnella pulchrelineata Stahlschmidt, Poppe & Chino, 2014

= Daphnella pulchrelineata =

Species of gastropod

Daphnella pulchrelineata is a species of sea snail, a marine gastropod mollusc in the family Raphitomidae.

== Description ==
The length of the shell varies between 6 mm and 17 mm.

== Distribution ==
This marine species was found off Mactan & Olango Islands, Philippines.
