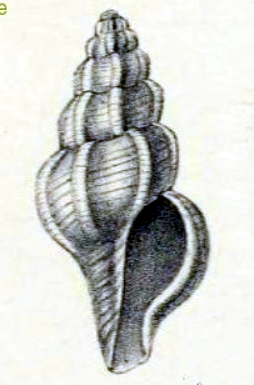
- Original image of a shell of Daphnella omaleyi

Scientific classification
- Kingdom: Animalia
- Phylum: Mollusca
- Class: Gastropoda
- Subclass: Caenogastropoda
- Order: Neogastropoda
- Superfamily: Conoidea
- Family: Raphitomidae
- Genus: Daphnella
- Species: D. omaleyi

Binomial name
- Daphnella omaleyi (Melvill, 1899)

Synonyms
- Clathurella omaleyi Melvill, 1899

= Daphnella omaleyi =

Species of gastropod

Daphnella omaleyi is a species of sea snail, a marine gastropod mollusk in the family Raphitomidae.

== Description ==
The length of the shell attains 10 mm, its diameter 3 mm.

A very delicate flesh-coloured shining shell with oblong aperture and produced siphonal canal. This attenuate-fusiform shell contains 7 whorls, including two decussated and alveolate apical whorls. They are much impressed at the sutures, longitudinally few-ribbed, there are but seven on the body whorl, and spirally obscurely lirate. The outer lip and the base of the siphonal canal are tinged with brown. The columella is upright.

== Distribution ==
This marine species occurs in the Gulf of Oman.
