= Daphnella leucophlegma =

Scientific classification
- Kingdom: Animalia
- Phylum: Mollusca
- Class: Gastropoda
- Subclass: Caenogastropoda
- Order: Neogastropoda
- Superfamily: Conoidea
- Family: Raphitomidae
- Genus: Daphnella
- Species: D. leucophlegma

Binomial name
- Daphnella leucophlegma (Dall, 1881)

Synonyms
- Pleurotoma (Daphnella ?) leucophlegma Dall, 1881

Species of gastropod

Daphnella leucophlegma is a species of sea snail, a marine gastropod mollusk in the family Raphitomidae.

== Description ==
The length of the shell attains 10.25 mm, its diameter 4.25 mm.

(Original description) The thin, delicate shell is pearly white. It is acute, with nine rapidly enlarging whorls, roundly inflated (especially the last), which gives a turreted appearance to the spire . The protoconch is minute, glassy, smooth, simple. The nuclear whorls are not separated by any sudden change of character from the rest of the shell. The general sculpture consistis of numerous close-set (three or four to a millimeter) narrow plications extending from near the suture obliquely and flexuously across the whorls, in general correspondence with the lines of growth. On the body whorl they fade away anteriorly are and barely visible at the periphery. The lines of growth are generally pretty distinct. The whole shell is covered with fine, somewhat wavy, spiral grooves and intervening threads, not strong enough to give a rough appearance to the surface, and evenly distributed (twelve to sixteen in a millimeter). The aperture is large, semilunate. The outer lip is thin, simple, much arched and produced at the middle, and rounding broadly to the anterior end of the columella. The columella shows a slight callus, obliquely trimmed to a point, and slightly recurved anteriorly. The notch is obsolete, forming no distinct band, though indicated by the lines of growth and by a slight flattening of the whorl just in front of the distinct and well-marked suture.

== Distribution ==
D. leucophlegma can be found in Caribbean waters, off the northwestern coast of Cuba.
