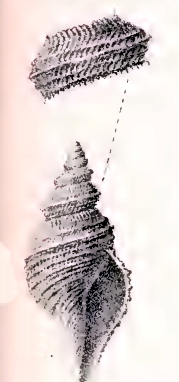
- Original image of a shell of Daphnella sabrina

Scientific classification
- Kingdom: Animalia
- Phylum: Mollusca
- Class: Gastropoda
- Subclass: Caenogastropoda
- Order: Neogastropoda
- Superfamily: Conoidea
- Family: Raphitomidae
- Genus: Daphnella
- Species: D. sabrina

Binomial name
- Daphnella sabrina Melvill, 1906

= Daphnella sabrina =

Species of gastropod

Daphnella sabrina is a species of sea snail, a marine gastropod mollusk in the family Raphitomidae.

== Description ==
The length of the shell attains 5 mm, its diameter 3 mm.

The delicate, white, ovate-fusiform shell is extremely highly sculptured, with many oblique, spiral carinae (two at the antepenultimate whorl, three at the penultimate and five at the body whorl), one being especially conspicuous at the periphery. The cross cancellations are pronounced and fine. The shell contains eight whorls. The 3-4 apical whorls are ochreous and minutely decussate, the subsequent whorls are impressed at the suture. The wide aperture is ovate. The siphonal canal is short. The outer lip is thin. The columella stands almost upright. The sinus is wide and not deep.

== Distribution ==
This species occurs in the Gulf of Oman.
