= Daphnella mazatlanica =

Scientific classification
- Kingdom: Animalia
- Phylum: Mollusca
- Class: Gastropoda
- Subclass: Caenogastropoda
- Order: Neogastropoda
- Superfamily: Conoidea
- Family: Raphitomidae
- Genus: Daphnella
- Species: D. mazatlanica

Binomial name
- Daphnella mazatlanica Pilsbry & Lowe, 1932

Synonyms
- Daphnella panamica Pilsbry & Lowe, 1932

Species of gastropod

Daphnella mazatlanica is a species of sea snail, a marine gastropod mollusk in the family Raphitomidae.

== Description ==
The length of the shell varies between 7 mm and 15 mm.

== Distribution ==
This marine species occurs from the Gulf of California to Ecuador; also off the Galapagos Islands.
