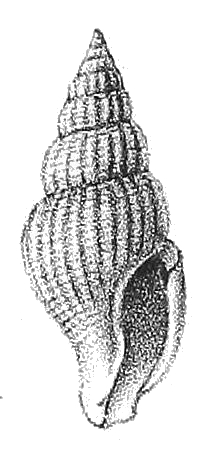
- Image of a shell of Daphnella evergestis

Scientific classification
- Kingdom: Animalia
- Phylum: Mollusca
- Class: Gastropoda
- Subclass: Caenogastropoda
- Order: Neogastropoda
- Superfamily: Conoidea
- Family: Raphitomidae
- Genus: Daphnella
- Species: D. evergestis

Binomial name
- Daphnella evergestis Melvill & Standen, 1901

= Daphnella evergestis =

Species of gastropod

Daphnella evergestis is a species of sea snail, a marine gastropod mollusk in the family Raphitomidae.

== Description ==
The length of the shell attains 12 mm, its diameter 4 mm.

The color of the whitish or straw shell is variegated with darker maculations on some examples. The shell is elegantly fusiform. It contains 8 whorls. These are rounded but much impressed at the sutures. The two almost vitreous whorls in the protoconch are most delicately decussate. The remainder of the whorls are closely obliquely ribbed, crossed by many spirals, slightly gemmulate at the points of junction. This gives a white shining appearance to the ribs, which on the body whorl number about twenty-six. The aperture is oval. The outer lip is thickened. The sinus is very superficial, but broad, close below the suture. The siphonal canal is slightly recurved and short.

== Distribution ==
This marine species occurs in the Gulf of Oman.
