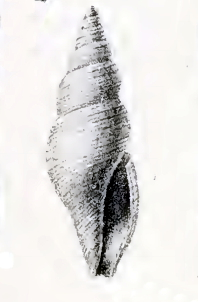
- Original image of a shell of Daphnella arafurensis

Scientific classification
- Kingdom: Animalia
- Phylum: Mollusca
- Class: Gastropoda
- Subclass: Caenogastropoda
- Order: Neogastropoda
- Superfamily: Conoidea
- Family: Raphitomidae
- Genus: Daphnella
- Species: D. arafurensis

Binomial name
- Daphnella arafurensis (E.A. Smith, 1884)

Synonyms
- Daphnella (Daphnella) arafurensis (Smith, 1884); Pleurotoma arafurensis E.A. Smith, 1884; Pleurotoma (Daphnella) arafurensis Smith, 1884 (original combination)

= Daphnella arafurensis =

Species of gastropod

Daphnella arafurensis is a species of sea snail, a marine gastropod mollusk in the family Raphitomidae.

== Description ==
The length of the shell attains 15 mm, its diameter 4.3 mm.

(Original description) The fusiform shell is whitish, faintly banded with light brown. It is spirally ridged and striated and marked with the flexuous lines of growth. This species is peculiar on account of the absence of longitudinal ribs. The shell contains 7 whorls. The two whorls in the protoconch are globose, microscopically reticulated, but appearing smooth under an ordinary lens, rather large. The subsequent five are convex, a little constricted beneath the suture, and spirally ridged and striated. The upper whorls have four or five principal lirae, the uppermost falling just beneath the slight constriction, and the others below at equal distances. The whorls are thickened at or immediately under the sutural line with an elevated ridge, and between this and the first lira and in the interstices between the other lirae the surface is finely striated. The body whorl is elongate, has about thirty-one ridges in addition to the minute interstriation. The aperture is narrow, contracted anteriorly into a short, broadish siphonal canal, together equalling almost half the total length of the shell. The columella is perpendicular, curving a little to the left in front, and coated with a very thin callosity. The outer lip is thickened exteriorly, arcuate in the middle, faintly sinuated towards the lower extremity, and rather deeply notched in the slight constriction of the whorl near but not at the suture.

== Distribution ==
This marine species occurs in the Arafura Sea, Torres Straits, Albany Passage; Queensland, Australia.
