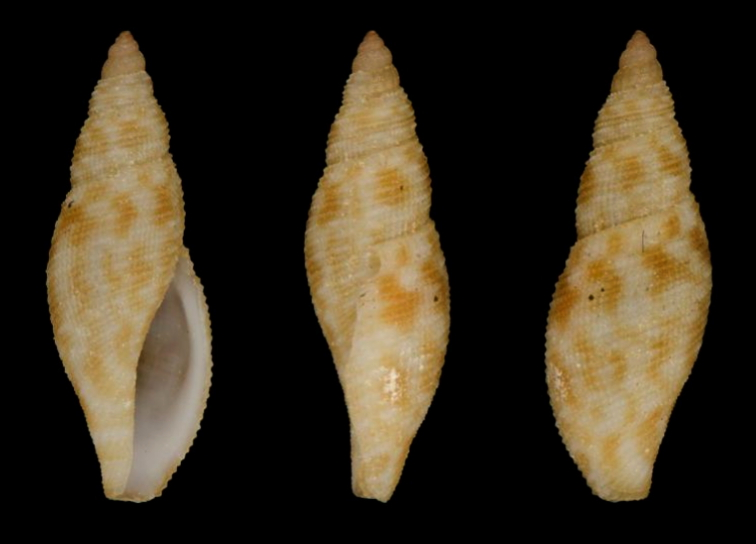
- Shell of Daphnella bartschi (holotype at the Smithsonian Institution)

Scientific classification
- Kingdom: Animalia
- Phylum: Mollusca
- Class: Gastropoda
- Subclass: Caenogastropoda
- Order: Neogastropoda
- Superfamily: Conoidea
- Family: Raphitomidae
- Genus: Daphnella
- Species: D. bartschi

Binomial name
- Daphnella bartschi Dall, 1919

= Daphnella bartschi =

Species of gastropod

Daphnella bartschi is a species of sea snail, a marine gastropod mollusk in the family Raphitomidae.

== Description ==
The length of the shell attains 10 mm, its diameter 5 mm.

(Original description) The small, slender shell is yellowish white with brown flames and flecks. The whorls are moderately convex. The suture is distinct. The shell contains six whorls, with a very minute brown protoconch of two whorls. The whole surface is delicately reticulated with subequal axial and spiral threads, the spirals cut by the axial interspaces into minute nodules, the interstices squarish. The surface resulting is grating to the touch. The aperture is narrow. The siphonal canal is hardly differentiated and not recurved.

== Distribution ==
This marine species occurs off Baja California, Mexico, and the Galapagos Islands
