= Daphnella retusa =

Scientific classification
- Kingdom: Animalia
- Phylum: Mollusca
- Class: Gastropoda
- Subclass: Caenogastropoda
- Order: Neogastropoda
- Superfamily: Conoidea
- Family: Raphitomidae
- Genus: Daphnella
- Species: D. retusa

Binomial name
- Daphnella retusa McLean & Poorman, 1971

Species of gastropod

Daphnella retusa is a species of sea snail, a marine gastropod mollusk in the family Raphitomidae.

== Description ==
The length of the shell attains 6 mm.

== Distribution ==
This species occurs in the Pacific Ocean off Panama.
