= Daphnella degrangei =

Scientific classification
- Kingdom: Animalia
- Phylum: Mollusca
- Class: Gastropoda
- Subclass: Caenogastropoda
- Order: Neogastropoda
- Superfamily: Conoidea
- Family: Raphitomidae
- Genus: Daphnella
- Species: D. degrangei

Binomial name
- Daphnella degrangei Cossmann, 1894

Extinct species of gastropod

Daphnella degrangei is an extinct species of sea snail which was a marine gastropod mollusc in the family of Raphitomidae.

== Description ==
The length of the shell attains 10 to 11 mm.

== Distribution ==
Fossils of this marine species were found in Miocene strata in Aquitaine, France.
