= Daphnella butleri =

Scientific classification
- Kingdom: Animalia
- Phylum: Mollusca
- Class: Gastropoda
- Subclass: Caenogastropoda
- Order: Neogastropoda
- Superfamily: Conoidea
- Family: Raphitomidae
- Genus: Daphnella
- Species: D. butleri

Binomial name
- Daphnella butleri (E.A. Smith, 1882)

Synonyms
- Pleurotoma (Daphnella) butleri E.A. Smith, 1882

Species of gastropod

Daphnella butleri is a species of sea snail, a marine gastropod mollusk in the family Raphitomidae.

== Description ==
The length of the shell attains 9.5 mm, its diameter 3 mm.

The white shell is oblong and slightly twisted. It probably contains eight whorls (the protoconch is broken off). The remaining whorls are rather flat. The shell is remarkable for the 13-14 slender ribs, which incline a little to the left at the upper suture, and the eight delicate thread-like lirations, of which the two or three uppermost are situated nearer together than the rest. About half a dozen of these encircle the base of the body whorl and become developed on crossing the fine ribs into little nodules. The thin callus on the upright columella is united above to the outer lip, and with it forms a loop-like sinus. The aperture is very narrow and measures about half the total length. The narrow siphonal canal is very short.

== Distribution ==
This marine species occurs off the Philippines.
