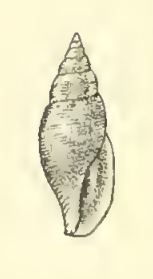
- Drawing of the shell of Daphnella cancellata

Scientific classification
- Kingdom: Animalia
- Phylum: Mollusca
- Class: Gastropoda
- Subclass: Caenogastropoda
- Order: Neogastropoda
- Superfamily: Conoidea
- Family: Raphitomidae
- Genus: Daphnella
- Species: D. cancellata

Binomial name
- Daphnella cancellata Hutton, 1878

Synonyms
- Daphnella (Daphnella) cancellata Hutton, 1878

= Daphnella cancellata =

Species of gastropod

Daphnella cancellata is a species of sea snail, a marine gastropod mollusk in the family Raphitomidae.

== Description ==
The length of the shell attains 22 mm, its diameter 8 mm.

(Original description) The thin, finely cancellated shell has a fusiform shape. The spire is acute. The aperture is oblong, slightly channelled in front. It shows a slight posterior sinus. Its colour is yellowish-white, slightly blotched with brown.

== Distribution ==
This marine species is endemic to New Zealand and occurs off Northland to Bay of Plenty and East Cape
