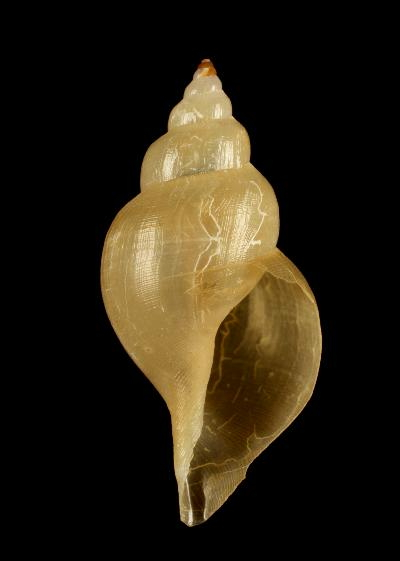
- Shell of Daphnella cladara (specimen at MNHN, Paris)

Scientific classification
- Kingdom: Animalia
- Phylum: Mollusca
- Class: Gastropoda
- Subclass: Caenogastropoda
- Order: Neogastropoda
- Superfamily: Conoidea
- Family: Raphitomidae
- Genus: Daphnella
- Species: D. cladara

Binomial name
- Daphnella cladara Sysoev & Bouchet, 2001

= Daphnella cladara =

Species of gastropod

Daphnella cladara is a species of sea snail, a marine gastropod mollusc in the family Raphitomidae.

== Distribution ==
This species was found on sea mounts in the Southwest Pacific.
