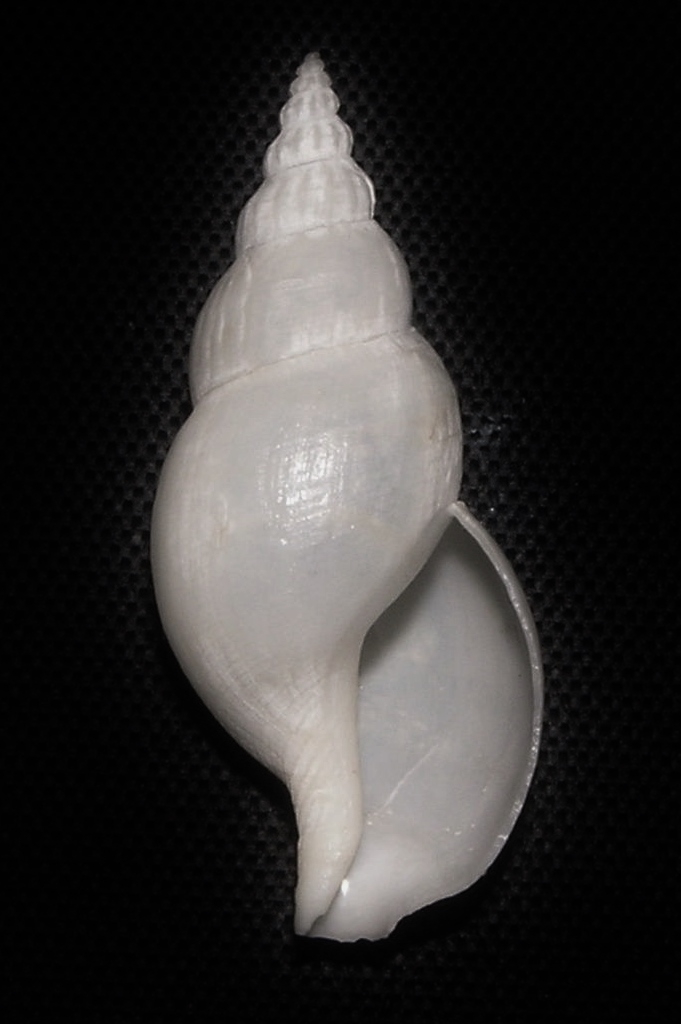
- Shell of Daphnella semivaricosa

Scientific classification
- Kingdom: Animalia
- Phylum: Mollusca
- Class: Gastropoda
- Subclass: Caenogastropoda
- Order: Neogastropoda
- Superfamily: Conoidea
- Family: Raphitomidae
- Genus: Daphnella
- Species: D. semivaricosa

Binomial name
- Daphnella semivaricosa Habe & Masuda, 1990

Synonyms
- Daphnella (Daphnella) semivaricosa Habe & Masuda, 1990

= Daphnella semivaricosa =

Species of gastropod

Daphnella semivaricosa is a species of sea snail, a marine gastropod mollusk in the family Raphitomidae.

== Distribution ==
This marine species occurs in the China Seas and off Japan.
