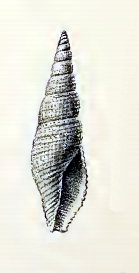
- Original image of a shell of Daphnella euphrosyne

Scientific classification
- Kingdom: Animalia
- Phylum: Mollusca
- Class: Gastropoda
- Subclass: Caenogastropoda
- Order: Neogastropoda
- Superfamily: Conoidea
- Family: Raphitomidae
- Genus: Daphnella
- Species: D. euphrosyne

Binomial name
- Daphnella euphrosyne Melvill & Standen, 1903

= Daphnella euphrosyne =

Species of gastropod

Daphnella euphrosyne is a species of sea snail, a marine gastropod mollusk in the family Raphitomidae.

== Description ==
The length of the shell attains 15 mm, its diameter 4 mm.

The white, attenuated, graceful shell contains ten whorls, of which four in the protoconch. The spiral liration is distinct and regular (23 in the body whorl). The narrow aperture is oblong. The outer lip is thin. The wide siphonal canal is more prolonged. The peristome could be more effuse. There is no columellar plication.

== Distribution ==
This marine species occurs in the Gulf of Oman.
