= Daphnella cubana =

Scientific classification
- Kingdom: Animalia
- Phylum: Mollusca
- Class: Gastropoda
- Subclass: Caenogastropoda
- Order: Neogastropoda
- Superfamily: Conoidea
- Family: Raphitomidae
- Genus: Daphnella
- Species: D. cubana

Binomial name
- Daphnella cubana Espinosa & Fernández-Garcés, 1990

Synonyms
- Daphnella (Paradaphne) cubana Espinosa & Fernández-Garcés, 1990· accepted, alternate

Species of gastropod

Daphnella cubana is a species of sea snail, a marine gastropod mollusk in the family Raphitomidae.

== Description ==
The length of the shell attains 15 mm.

== Distribution ==
D. cubana can be found in Atlantic waters, ranging from the Campeche Bank to Cuba, at a depth of between 6 and 70 meters.
