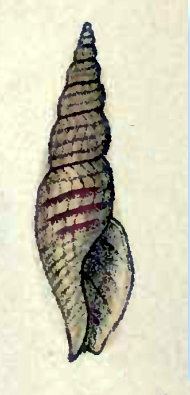
- Shell of Daphnella hyalina

Scientific classification
- Kingdom: Animalia
- Phylum: Mollusca
- Class: Gastropoda
- Subclass: Caenogastropoda
- Order: Neogastropoda
- Superfamily: Conoidea
- Family: Raphitomidae
- Genus: Daphnella
- Species: D. hyalina

Binomial name
- Daphnella hyalina (Reeve, 1845)

Synonyms
- Daphnella (Daphnella) hyalina (Reeve, 1845); Pleurotoma hyalina Reeve, 1845

= Daphnella hyalina =

Species of gastropod

Daphnella hyalina is a species of sea snail, a marine gastropod mollusk in the family Raphitomidae.

== Description ==
The length of the shell attains 14 mm.

The thin, transparent shell is longitudinally very minutely and closely elevately striated throughout. It is whitish, encircled by distant chestnut lines, sometimes borne on striae.
