= Daphnella sandwicensis =

Scientific classification
- Kingdom: Animalia
- Phylum: Mollusca
- Class: Gastropoda
- Subclass: Caenogastropoda
- Order: Neogastropoda
- Superfamily: Conoidea
- Family: Raphitomidae
- Genus: Daphnella
- Species: D. sandwicensis

Binomial name
- Daphnella sandwicensis Pease, 1860

Synonyms
- Daphnella sandwichensis Pease, 1860

Species of gastropod

Daphnella sandwicensis is a species of sea snail, a marine gastropod mollusk in the family Raphitomidae.

== Description ==
The length of the shell varies between 8 mm and 11 mm.

== Distribution ==
This marine species occurs off Hawaii.
