= Daphnella allemani =

Scientific classification
- Kingdom: Animalia
- Phylum: Mollusca
- Class: Gastropoda
- Subclass: Caenogastropoda
- Order: Neogastropoda
- Superfamily: Conoidea
- Family: Raphitomidae
- Genus: Daphnella
- Species: D. allemani

Binomial name
- Daphnella allemani (Bartsch, 1931)

Synonyms
- Daphnella thalia Schwabe, E., 1939; Eudaphne allemani Bartsch, 1931

Species of gastropod

Daphnella allemani is a species of sea snail, a marine gastropod mollusk in the family Raphitomidae.

== Description ==
The length of the shell attains 12.8 mm, its diameter is 4.5 mm.

== Distribution ==
This marine occurs off Taboga Island, Pacific Panama, and off the Galapagos Islands.
