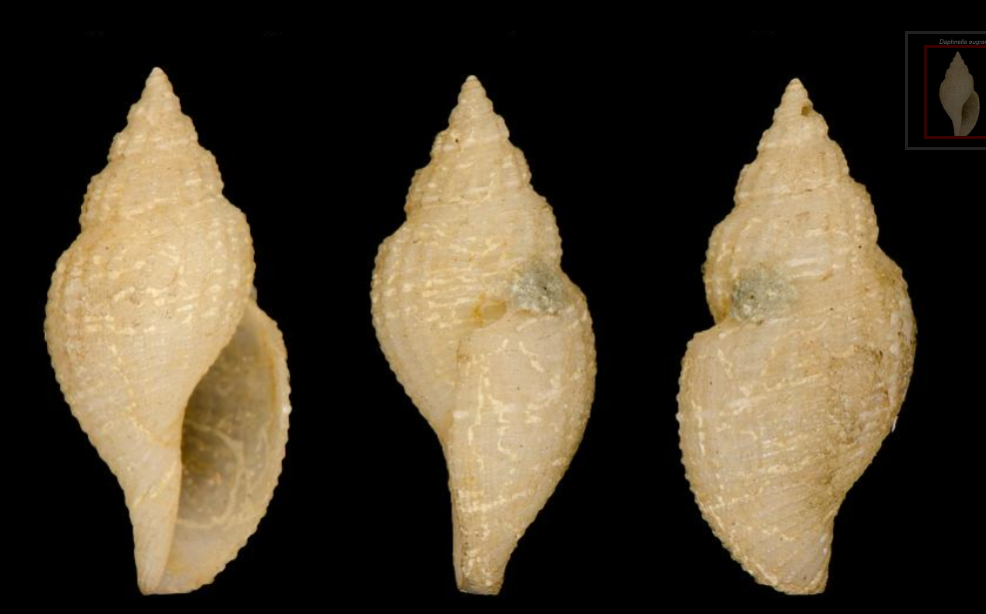
- Shell of Daphnella eugrammata (holotype at the Smithsonian Institution)

Scientific classification
- Kingdom: Animalia
- Phylum: Mollusca
- Class: Gastropoda
- Subclass: Caenogastropoda
- Order: Neogastropoda
- Superfamily: Conoidea
- Family: Raphitomidae
- Genus: Daphnella
- Species: D. eugrammata

Binomial name
- Daphnella eugrammata Dall, 1902

= Daphnella eugrammata =

Species of gastropod

Daphnella eugrammata is a species of sea snail, a marine gastropod mollusk in the family Raphitomidae.

== Description ==
The length of the shell attains 9 mm, its diameter 4 mm.

(Original description) The small shell is yellowish white. It shows rather coarse spiral channels, separated by narrow, rounded threads crossed by narrow riblets, strongly on the upper whorls, on the body whorl fainter. They extend axially from the broad concave fasciole to about the middle of the whorl, where they become obsolete. The outer lip is not lirate within and shows no callus on the columella.

== Distribution ==
D. eugrammata can be found in Caribbean waters, off the northwestern coast of Cuba. at a depth of 371 m.
