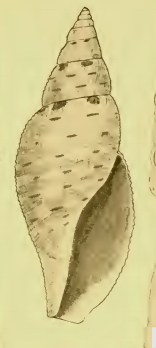
- Shell of Daphnella interrupta

Scientific classification
- Kingdom: Animalia
- Phylum: Mollusca
- Class: Gastropoda
- Subclass: Caenogastropoda
- Order: Neogastropoda
- Superfamily: Conoidea
- Family: Raphitomidae
- Genus: Daphnella
- Species: D. interrupta

Binomial name
- Daphnella interrupta Pease, 1860

Synonyms
- Daphnella fragilis (Reeve, 1845); Daphnella fragilis articulata Pilsbry, 1901 (invalid: junior homonym of Daphnella vitrea var. articulata Hervier, 1897); Daphnella pilsbryi Kuroda, 1947; Pleurotoma fragilis Reeve, 1845 (invalid: junior homonym of Pleurotoma fragilis Deshayes, 1834)

= Daphnella interrupta =

Species of mollusc

Daphnella interrupta is a species of sea snail, a marine gastropod mollusk in the family Raphitomidae.

== Description ==
The length of the shell attains 20 mm, its diameter 7 mm.

The protoconch contains two smooth whorls. The subsequent whorls are sculptured with unequal spiral cords, as coarse as those on the body whorl. They are densely crenulate or beaded by close fine longitudinal laminae, much less prominent and closer than the spirals. The body whorl is densely and evenly latticed by alternately larger and smaller spiral cords intersecting scarcely less prominent, but rather closer, longitudinal rib-striae. The color of the shell is pale brown, every fourth cord marked with brown in narrow lines along the cord, alternating with diffused white spots. A row of alternately brown and white squarish spots appear below the suture: the early whorls brown. The aperture is smooth within. The outer lip is thin, regularly arcuate, rather strongly retracted above.

== Distribution ==
This marine species occurs off the Hawaii, the Philippines, Japan and Korea.
