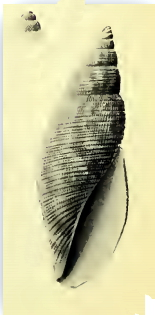
- Original image of a shell of Daphnella botanica

Scientific classification
- Kingdom: Animalia
- Phylum: Mollusca
- Class: Gastropoda
- Subclass: Caenogastropoda
- Order: Neogastropoda
- Superfamily: Conoidea
- Family: Raphitomidae
- Genus: Daphnella
- Species: D. botanica

Binomial name
- Daphnella botanica Hedley, 1922

Synonyms
- Daphnella (Daphnella) botanica Hedley, 1918; Paradaphne bucklandi Laseron, C.F., 1954; Pleurotoma fragilis Reeve, L.A., 1845 (renamed - not † Pleurotoma fragilis Deshayes, 1834)

= Daphnella botanica =

Species of gastropod

Daphnella botanica, common names the botanic turrid and Botany Bay turrid, is a species of sea snail, a marine gastropod mollusk in the family Raphitomidae.

== Description ==
The length of the shell attains 26 mm, its diameter 7 mm.

(Original description) The shell is ovate, ventricose, thin, fragile and transparent. The body whorl is very much the largest. The shell is very closely reticulated throughout with fine raised lines, of which the transverse are the stronger. The aperture is large and sinuated. The base and the columella are truncated. The color of the shell is transparent white.

(Renamed by Hedley) The shell is slender-fusiform, slightly contracted at the base. The spire is produced.

Colour: On a buff ground the whole surface is irregularly clouded or mottled with burnt umber, the dark spaces often predominating.

The shell contains six whorls, plus the protoconch, rounded, wound obliquely, excavated at the fasciole, and angled below it.

Sculpture: The protoconch consists of 2½ whorls and is microscopically obliquely reticulated. The body whorl has about forty spiral threads, the penultimate twelve, and so on till the topmost with three is reached. Between the larger threads smaller ones are intercalated, and gradually enlarge till of equal size. The small sharp radials, close set at the rate of about eighty to a whorl, override the spirals and produce beads at the points of intersection. These extend unbroken across the whole shell. The aperture is oblique elliptical, half the length of the shell. The outer lip is thin and arched forward. The notch is deep and broad. The inner lip excavates the sculpture of raised network in its path of advancement. The columella shows a thin callus deposit.

== Distribution ==
This marine species is endemic to Australia and occurs off New South Wales, Tasmania and Western Australia.
