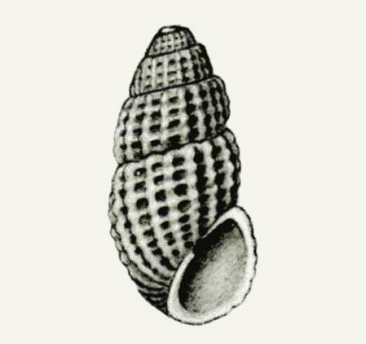

Scientific classification
- Kingdom: Animalia
- Phylum: Mollusca
- Class: Gastropoda
- Subclass: Caenogastropoda
- Order: Neogastropoda
- Superfamily: Conoidea
- Family: Raphitomidae
- Genus: Daphnella
- Species: D. corbula

Binomial name
- Daphnella corbula Thiele, 1925

= Daphnella corbula =

Species of gastropod

Daphnella corbula is a species of minuscule sea snail, a marine gastropod micromollusk in the family Raphitomidae.

== Description ==
The shell of this species attains a length of 3.8 mm and a width of 1.75 mm. The specimen collected when the species was discovered has 5.75 coils. The protoconch is indistinguishable from the rest of the shell, and the remaining 3.5 coils have fairly pronounced, rounded spiral sculpture and transverse ribs. The shoulder edge is strongly protruding, and the spaces in between them are granular. The aperture has a clear indentation at the top, a row of nodes in the inside, and a strong varix-like thickening on the outside.

== Distribution ==
The marine species occurs in the Indian Ocean, with instances recorded off South Africa (near 32.3°S 29.1°E, 32.2°S 29.0°E) and Sumatra, Indonesia (near 1.0°S 98.0°E, 0.5°S 98.0°E (Note: Source states site of discovery as "Station 193," which exists at said coordinates.)).
