= Daphnella xylois =

- Original image of a shell of Daphnella xylois

Scientific classification
- Kingdom: Animalia
- Phylum: Mollusca
- Class: Gastropoda
- Subclass: Caenogastropoda
- Order: Neogastropoda
- Superfamily: Conoidea
- Family: Raphitomidae
- Genus: Daphnella
- Species: D. xylois

Binomial name
- Daphnella xylois Melvill & Standen, 1901

Species of gastropod

Daphnella xylois is a species of sea snail, a marine gastropod mollusc in the family Raphitomidae.

This is a taxon inquirendum.

== Description ==
The length of the shell attains 13 mm, its diameter 4.5 mm.

This delicate, white, fusiform shell contains 9½ whorls, of which 2½ in the protoconch. It is beautifully encircled with microscopic cancellae, which are gemmuled at the points of junction, giving a sericeous appearance to the surface when examined with an ordinary lens of low power. Under a higher objective the protoconch is perceived to be vitreous, most delicately cancellate throughout. The next three whorls possess coarse varicose longitudinal ribs. The remaining whorls are all plane and clouded with flame-like chestnut markings. The white aperture is oblong. The sinus of the holotype (probably not full grown) is not discernible. The outer lip is slightly effuse. The columella is thin. The siphonal canal is extremely short.

== Distribution ==
This marine species occurs in the Gulf of Oman.
