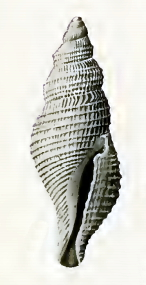
- Original image of a shell of Daphnella cheverti

Scientific classification
- Kingdom: Animalia
- Phylum: Mollusca
- Class: Gastropoda
- Subclass: Caenogastropoda
- Order: Neogastropoda
- Superfamily: Conoidea
- Family: Raphitomidae
- Genus: Daphnella
- Species: D. cheverti

Binomial name
- Daphnella cheverti Hedley, 1922

Synonyms
- Daphnella (Daphnella) cheverti Hedley, 1922; Daphnella pluricarinata Brazier, 1876 (not Pleurotoma pluricarinata Reeve, 1845)

= Daphnella cheverti =

Species of gastropod

Daphnella cheverti is a species of sea snail, a marine gastropod mollusk in the family Raphitomidae.

== Description ==
The length of the shell attains 6.5 mm, its diameter 2.6 mm.

(Original description) The small, thin shell has a narrow-fusiform shape. It is subturreted, blunt at the apex, and attenuate anteriorly. Its colour is ochraceous-buff, gradually becoming darker towards the apex. It contains six whorls, of which three compose the protoconch. The body whorl is rounded, the earlier ones angled at the shoulder. The sculpture is delicate. The radials are close thin lamellae which do not surmount the spirals, but rise into scales along the sutures. The spirals are sharp widely-spaced threads, of which there are twenty on the body whorl, evenly distributed between the fasciole and the end of the siphonal canal. Five of these ascend the penultimate whorl. The aperture is simple. The outer lip is thin. The sinus is wide and shallow. The siphonal canal is produced.

== Distribution ==
This marine species is endemic to Australia and occurs off Queensland.
