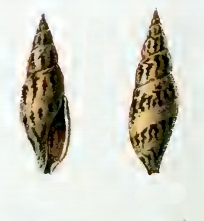
- Original image of a shell of Daphnella spencerae

Scientific classification
- Kingdom: Animalia
- Phylum: Mollusca
- Class: Gastropoda
- Subclass: Caenogastropoda
- Order: Neogastropoda
- Superfamily: Conoidea
- Family: Raphitomidae
- Genus: Daphnella
- Species: D. spencerae

Binomial name
- Daphnella spencerae G.B. Sowerby III, 1893

= Daphnella spencerae =

Species of gastropod

Daphnella spencerae is a species of sea snail, a marine gastropod mollusk in the family Raphitomidae.

== Description ==
The length of the shell attains 10 mm, its diameter 4 mm.

(Original description) The acuminate-fusiform shell is white with red spots. The spire is acuminate and acute. The shell contains eight slightly convex whorls. It is finely spirally striated throughout, the upper whorls being longitudinally plicated. The body whorl is lightly inflated. The aperture is oblong. The outer lip is arcuate and acute. The sinus is deep and narrow. The siphonal canal is very short. The colouring consists of conspicuous rounded brown blotches, which upon the body whorl are disposed in two rows, one above and one below the middle of the whorl.

== Distribution ==
This marine species occurs off Hong Kong.
