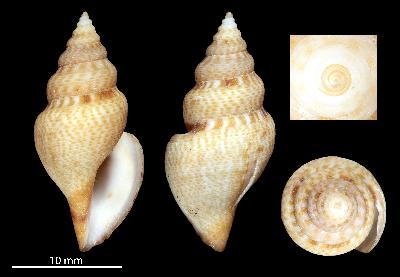
- Shell of Daphnella pulviscula (specimen at MNHN, Paris)

Scientific classification
- Kingdom: Animalia
- Phylum: Mollusca
- Class: Gastropoda
- Subclass: Caenogastropoda
- Order: Neogastropoda
- Superfamily: Conoidea
- Family: Raphitomidae
- Genus: Daphnella
- Species: D. pulviscula

Binomial name
- Daphnella pulviscula Chino, 2006

= Daphnella pulviscula =

Species of sea snail

Daphnella pulviscula is a species of sea snail, a marine gastropod mollusc in the family Raphitomidae.

== Description ==
The length of the shell attains 23 mm.

== Distribution ==
This species of sea snail occurs within south-western Japan and the western Pacific Ocean.
