= Daphnella bedoyai =

Scientific classification
- Kingdom: Animalia
- Phylum: Mollusca
- Class: Gastropoda
- Subclass: Caenogastropoda
- Order: Neogastropoda
- Superfamily: Conoidea
- Family: Raphitomidae
- Genus: Daphnella
- Species: D. bedoyai

Binomial name
- Daphnella bedoyai (Rolán, Otero-Schmitt & F. Fernandes, 1998)

Species of gastropod

Daphnella bedoyai is a species of sea snail, a marine gastropod mollusk in the family Raphitomidae.
