= Daphnella gemmulifera =

Scientific classification
- Kingdom: Animalia
- Phylum: Mollusca
- Class: Gastropoda
- Subclass: Caenogastropoda
- Order: Neogastropoda
- Superfamily: Conoidea
- Family: Raphitomidae
- Genus: Daphnella
- Species: D. gemmulifera

Binomial name
- Daphnella gemmulifera McLean & Poorman, 1971

Species of gastropod

Daphnella gemmulifera is a species of sea snail, a marine gastropod mollusk in the family Raphitomidae.

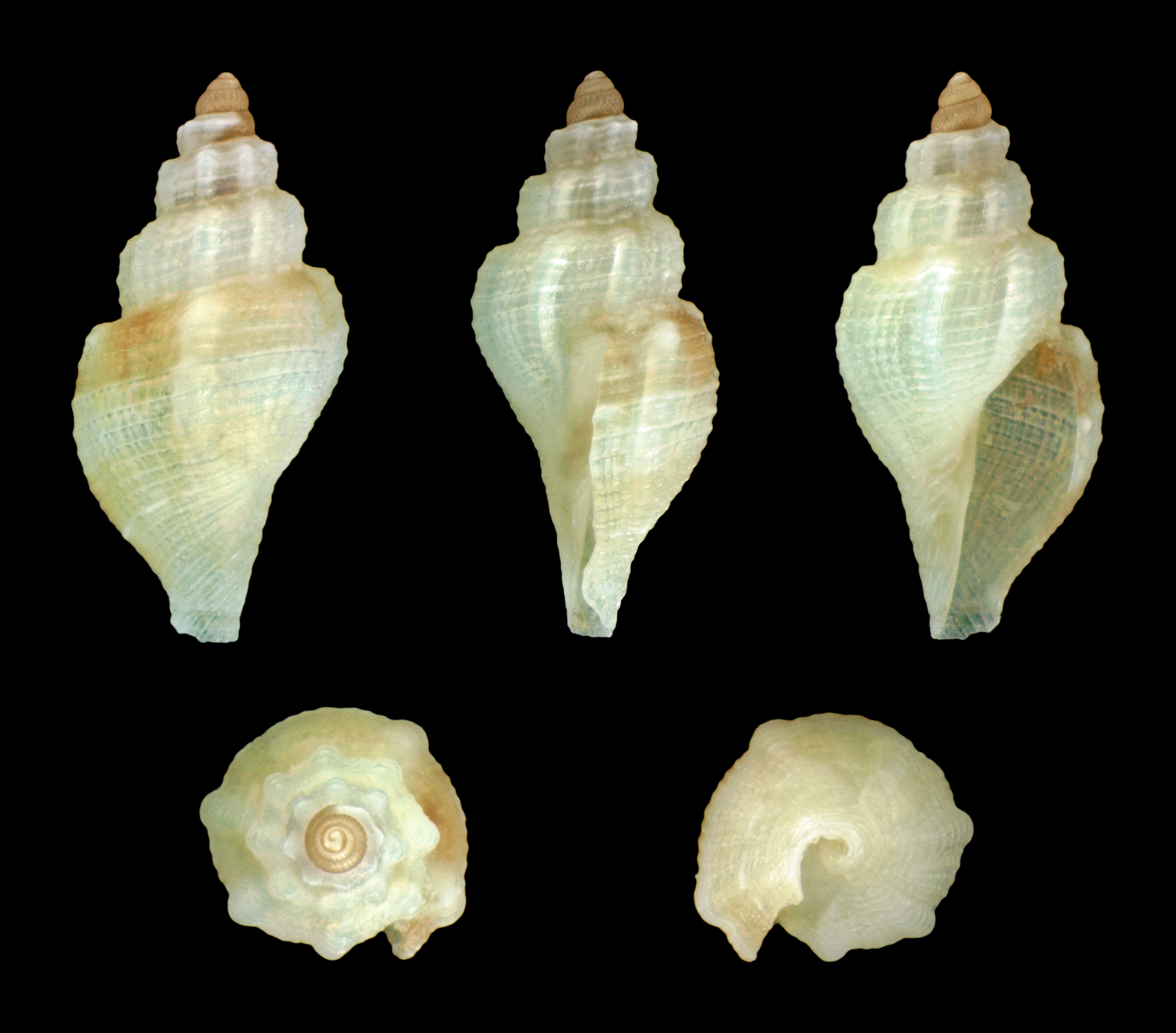
Juvenile

== Distribution ==
This marine species occurs off the Galapagos Islands.
