= Daphnella phyxelis =

Scientific classification
- Kingdom: Animalia
- Phylum: Mollusca
- Class: Gastropoda
- Subclass: Caenogastropoda
- Order: Neogastropoda
- Superfamily: Conoidea
- Family: Raphitomidae
- Genus: Daphnella
- Species: D. phyxelis

Binomial name
- Daphnella phyxelis Barnard, 1964

Species of gastropod

Daphnella phyxelis is a species of sea snail, a marine gastropod mollusc in the family Raphitomidae.

== Description ==
The length of this broken shell may have been 12 mm long. The holotype consists of the protoconch and two subsequent whorls.

== Distribution ==
This marine species occurs off Natal, South Africa.
