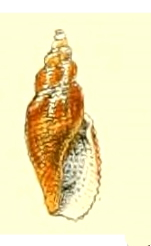
- Original image of a shell of Daphnella crebriplicata

Scientific classification
- Kingdom: Animalia
- Phylum: Mollusca
- Class: Gastropoda
- Subclass: Caenogastropoda
- Order: Neogastropoda
- Superfamily: Conoidea
- Family: Raphitomidae
- Genus: Daphnella
- Species: D. crebriplicata

Binomial name
- Daphnella crebriplicata (Reeve, 1846)

Synonyms
- Pleurotoma crebriplicata Reeve, 1846 (original combination)

= Daphnella crebriplicata =

Species of gastropod

Daphnella crebriplicata, the closely plaited pleurotoma, is a species of sea snail, a marine gastropod mollusk in the family Raphitomidae.

== Description ==
(Original description) The ovate, shell is ventricosely sinuated. The whorls are concentrically closely plaited and transversely closely ridged. The aperture is wide open. The color of the shell is white, profusely variegated with rich orange-brown.

== Distribution ==
This marine species occurs off the Philippines.
