= Daphnella canaliculata =

Scientific classification
- Kingdom: Animalia
- Phylum: Mollusca
- Class: Gastropoda
- Subclass: Caenogastropoda
- Order: Neogastropoda
- Superfamily: Conoidea
- Family: Raphitomidae
- Genus: Daphnella
- Species: D. canaliculata

Binomial name
- Daphnella canaliculata Ardovini, 2009

Species of gastropod

Daphnella canaliculata is a species of sea snail, a marine gastropod mollusc in the family Raphitomidae.

== Description ==
The length of the shell attains 8 mm.

== Distribution ==
This marine species occurs off the Philippines.
