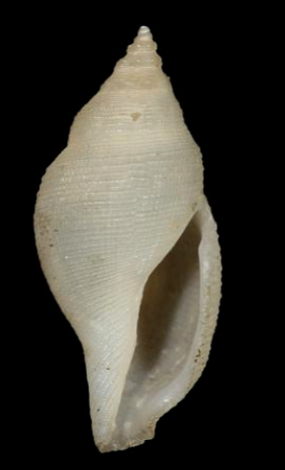
- Shell of Daphnella reticulosa (holotype at the Smithsonian Institution)

Scientific classification
- Kingdom: Animalia
- Phylum: Mollusca
- Class: Gastropoda
- Subclass: Caenogastropoda
- Order: Neogastropoda
- Superfamily: Conoidea
- Family: Raphitomidae
- Genus: Daphnella
- Species: D. reticulosa

Binomial name
- Daphnella reticulosa (Dall, 1889)

Synonyms
- Daphnella reticulatus Dall, 1889; Mangilia (Daphnella) reticulosa Dall, 1889

= Daphnella reticulosa =

Species of gastropod

Daphnella reticulosa is a species of sea snail, a marine gastropod mollusk in the family Raphitomidae.

== Description ==
The length of the shell attains 11.5 mm, its diameter 7 mm.

(Original description) The small shell is translucent white or yellowish, of porcellanous texture. The protoconch has a sinusigerid (or diagonally cancellate) structure, followed by 5½ normal whorls. The general shape is elegantly fusiform, but with a rather blunt-ended siphonal canal. The spiral sculpture consists of fine even rounded elevated threads, nearly uniform all over the shell, about half as wide as the interspaces in most of which run an extremely fine intercalary thread. The primary threads average about eight in the breadth of a millimeter. The transverse sculpture, first, consists of very fine distinct uniform lines of growth about twice as numerous in the same space as the primary spiral threads, which last are beautifully reticulated and to some extent rendered nodulous, or rather minutely wavy, by the intersections; secondly, on the earlier whorls, consists of rather stout distant rounded riblets or waves seven or eight to a whorl, most distinct on the first whorl and entirely evanescent on the last two whorls. These are slightly oblique, and extend from the anterior margin of the anal fasciole to the suture in front. The whorls are a little irregular in form. The suture is strongly appressed. The sculpture, as usual, is less strong, but still perfectly distinct, on the fasciole. The notch is rather deep, semicircular behind. The aperture is longer than half the shell, moderately narrow, with the siphonal canal well defined and somewhat curved to the right. The outer lip is thickened within, slightly dentate at the margin from the spiral sculpture. There is a slight callus on the body and columella, well inside the aperture, and the columella is nearly straight.

== Distribution ==
D. reticulosa can be found in Caribbean waters, ranging from the western coast of Florida to Barbados.
