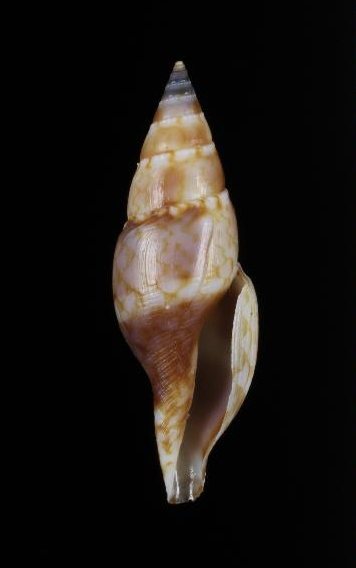
- Shell of Daphnella mitrellaformis (specimen at MNHN, Paris)

Scientific classification
- Kingdom: Animalia
- Phylum: Mollusca
- Class: Gastropoda
- Subclass: Caenogastropoda
- Order: Neogastropoda
- Superfamily: Conoidea
- Family: Raphitomidae
- Genus: Daphnella
- Species: D. mitrellaformis

Binomial name
- Daphnella mitrellaformis (Nomura, 1940)

Synonyms
- Colus mitrellaformis Nomura, 1940; Daphnella (Daphnella) mitrellaformis (Nomura, S., 1940)

= Daphnella mitrellaformis =

Species of gastropod

Daphnella mitrellaformis is a species of sea snail, a marine gastropod mollusk in the family Raphitomidae.

== Description ==
The length of the shell varies between 18 mm and 40 mm.

== Distribution ==
This marine species occurs off the Philippines and Japan.
