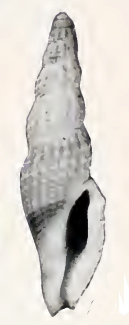
- Shell of Daphnella aspersa

Scientific classification
- Kingdom: Animalia
- Phylum: Mollusca
- Class: Gastropoda
- Subclass: Caenogastropoda
- Order: Neogastropoda
- Superfamily: Conoidea
- Family: Raphitomidae
- Genus: Daphnella
- Species: D. aspersa

Binomial name
- Daphnella aspersa (Gould, 1860)

Synonyms
- Clathurella aspersa Gould, 1860

= Daphnella aspersa =

Species of gastropod

Daphnella aspersa is a species of sea snail, a marine gastropod mollusk in the family Raphitomidae.

== Original Description ==
Original description of Clathurella aspersa (Gould, 1860). Descriptions of new shells collected by the United States North Pacific Exploring Expedition. Proceedings of the Boston Society of Natural History. 7: 323-336 [September 1860], 337-340 [October 1860], 382-384 [December 1860]., available online . This marine species occurs off Hong Kong.
