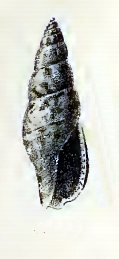
- Original image of a shell of Daphnella hedya

Scientific classification
- Kingdom: Animalia
- Phylum: Mollusca
- Class: Gastropoda
- Subclass: Caenogastropoda
- Order: Neogastropoda
- Superfamily: Conoidea
- Family: Raphitomidae
- Genus: Daphnella
- Species: D. hedya

Binomial name
- Daphnella hedya Melvill & Standen, 1903

= Daphnella hedya =

Species of gastropod

Daphnella hedya is a species of sea snail, a marine gastropod mollusk in the family Raphitomidae.

== Description ==
The length of the shell attains 14 mm, its diameter 5 mm.

The fusiform shell shows chestnut markings. It contains nine whorls of which 3½ subhyaline whorls in the protoconch. The subsequent whorls are elegantly rounded. The shell has a minute, gemmuliferous decussation. The smallish aperture is oblong. The outer lip is slightly inflated and smooth on the inside. The sinus is not deep. The purple siphonal canal bends slightly backwards.

== Distribution ==
This marine species occurs in the Persian Gulf.
