= Daphnella sinuata =

Scientific classification
- Kingdom: Animalia
- Phylum: Mollusca
- Class: Gastropoda
- Subclass: Caenogastropoda
- Order: Neogastropoda
- Superfamily: Conoidea
- Family: Raphitomidae
- Genus: Daphnella
- Species: D. sinuata

Binomial name
- Daphnella sinuata (Carpenter, P.P., 1856)

Synonyms
- Cithara sinuata Carpenter, 1856; Mangilia sinuata Carpenter, 1856

Species of gastropod

Daphnella sinuata is a species of sea snail, a marine gastropod mollusk in the family Raphitomidae.

== Description ==
The length of the shell attains 11 mm.

(Original description in Latin) The shell is trapezoidal, with a somewhat elevated spire and outwardly curved margins. It is whitish, variously tinged with reddish brown.

There are nine somewhat rounded whorls, separated by a slightly impressed suture. The first three whorls are belong to the protoconch. These are diaphanous, and smooth; the subsequent whorls are strongly cancellated by spiral and radial lirae. They are normally finely sculptured with radial lirulae and spiral striae, which become subobsolete on the body whorl.

The aperture is lined and has a very shallow, strongly curved anterior canal. The outer lip is acute and calloused on the back; it has a small anterior sinus and a narrow, deep posterior sinus. The interior is not denticulate, and there is neither a parietal lip nor a callus.

== Distribution ==
This marine species occurs off Pacific Panama.
