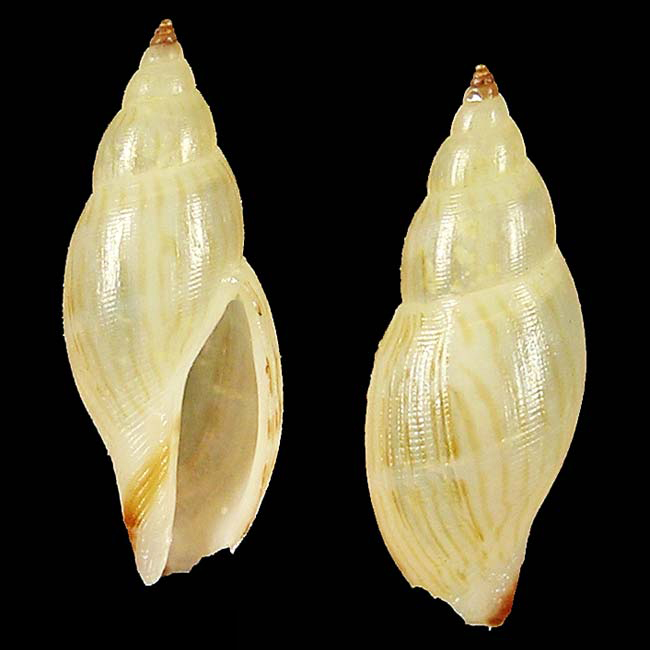
- Shell of Daphnella graminea (holotype at MNHN, Paris)

Scientific classification
- Kingdom: Animalia
- Phylum: Mollusca
- Class: Gastropoda
- Subclass: Caenogastropoda
- Order: Neogastropoda
- Superfamily: Conoidea
- Family: Raphitomidae
- Genus: Daphnella
- Species: D. graminea

Binomial name
- Daphnella graminea Stahlschmidt, Poppe & Chino, 2014

= Daphnella graminea =

Species of gastropod

Daphnella graminea is a species of sea snail, a marine gastropod mollusc in the family Raphitomidae.

== Description ==
The length of the shell varies between 9 mm and 14 mm.

== Distribution ==
This marine species was found off Cebu, Philippines.
