= Daphnella bertrandiana =

Scientific classification
- Kingdom: Animalia
- Phylum: Mollusca
- Class: Gastropoda
- Subclass: Caenogastropoda
- Order: Neogastropoda
- Superfamily: Conoidea
- Family: Raphitomidae
- Genus: Daphnella
- Species: D. bertrandiana

Binomial name
- Daphnella bertrandiana (Millet, 1865)

Synonyms
- † Buccinum bertrandianum Millet, 1865 (original combination); † Daphnella (Daphnella) bertrandiana (Millet, 1865)· accepted, alternate representation; † Raphitoma bertrandiana (Millet, 1865)

Extinct species of gastropod

Daphnella bertrandiana is an extinct species of sea snail, a marine gastropod mollusc in the family Raphitomidae.

== Distribution ==
Fossils of this extinct marine species were found in Lower Pliocene strata in France.
