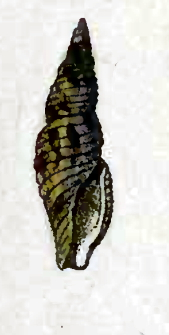
- Shell of Daphnella pluricarinata

Scientific classification
- Kingdom: Animalia
- Phylum: Mollusca
- Class: Gastropoda
- Subclass: Caenogastropoda
- Order: Neogastropoda
- Superfamily: Conoidea
- Family: Raphitomidae
- Genus: Daphnella
- Species: D. pluricarinata

Binomial name
- Daphnella pluricarinata (Reeve, 1845)

Synonyms
- Pleurotoma pluricarinata Reeve, 1845

= Daphnella pluricarinata =

Species of gastropod

Daphnella pluricarinata is a species of sea snail, a marine gastropod mollusk in the family Raphitomidae.

== Description ==
The length of the shell attains 7.5 mm.

The shell is encircled by numerous sharp keels. The interstices are longitudinally striate. The sinus is rather large. The color of the shell is whitish, stained with streaks of orange-brown.

== Distribution ==
This marine species occurs off the Philippines.
