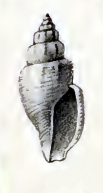
- Original image of a shell of Daphnella veneris

Scientific classification
- Kingdom: Animalia
- Phylum: Mollusca
- Class: Gastropoda
- Subclass: Caenogastropoda
- Order: Neogastropoda
- Superfamily: Conoidea
- Family: Raphitomidae
- Genus: Daphnella
- Species: D. veneris

Binomial name
- Daphnella veneris Melvill, J.C. & R. Standen, 1901

= Daphnella veneris =

Species of gastropod

Daphnella veneris is a species of sea snail, a marine gastropod mollusk in the family Raphitomidae.

== Description ==
The length of the shell attains 9mm, its diameter 3.25 mm

This is a peculiarly milky white, oblong-gradate species. It contains eight whorls of which two vitreous whorls in the protoconch. The sculpture is, as in most Daphnella, elaborately cancellate as regards the protoconch. The whorls next to this are irregularly varicose-costate, and are crossed by delicate non-gemmuled spirals. It is on the body whorl alone, which is slightly effusely ventricose, that these gemmules appear, which are extremely beautiful microscopic objects. The aperture is wide. The outer lip is effuse and slightly incrassate. The sinus, sinuate just below the suture, is very broad. The siphonal canal is very short. The columella stands upright.

== Distribution ==
This species occurs in the Gulf of Oman
