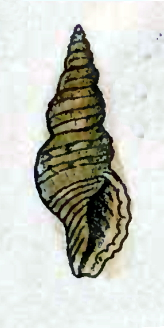
- Shell of Daphnella ticaonica

Scientific classification
- Kingdom: Animalia
- Phylum: Mollusca
- Class: Gastropoda
- Subclass: Caenogastropoda
- Order: Neogastropoda
- Superfamily: Conoidea
- Family: Raphitomidae
- Genus: Daphnella
- Species: D. ticaonica

Binomial name
- Daphnella ticaonica (Reeve, 1843)

Synonyms
- Eucyclotoma ticaonica (Reeve, 1845); Pleurotoma ticaonica Reeve, 1845 (original combination)

= Daphnella ticaonica =

Species of gastropod

Daphnella ticaonica is a species of sea snail, a marine gastropod mollusk in the family Raphitomidae.

== Description ==
The length of the shell attains 12 mm (0.47 in).

The whorls are rather ventricose and spirally irregularly ridged. The interstices between the ridges are very minutely latticed. The sinus is small. The color of the shell is whitish, flamed here and there with orange-brown.

== Distribution ==
This marine species occurs off the Philippines.
