= Daphnella hayesi =

Scientific classification
- Kingdom: Animalia
- Phylum: Mollusca
- Class: Gastropoda
- Subclass: Caenogastropoda
- Order: Neogastropoda
- Superfamily: Conoidea
- Family: Raphitomidae
- Genus: Daphnella
- Species: D. hayesi

Binomial name
- Daphnella hayesi Nowell-Usticke, 1959

Species of gastropod

Daphnella hayesi is a species of sea snail, a marine gastropod mollusk in the family Raphitomidae.

== Description ==
The length of the shell attains 10 mm.

== Distribution ==
This marine species occurs off the Virgin Islands, Guadeloupe and Antigua.
