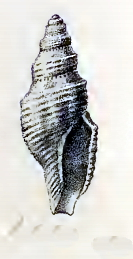
- Original image of a shell of Daphnella thygatrica

Scientific classification
- Kingdom: Animalia
- Phylum: Mollusca
- Class: Gastropoda
- Subclass: Caenogastropoda
- Order: Neogastropoda
- Superfamily: Conoidea
- Family: Raphitomidae
- Genus: Daphnella
- Species: D. thygatrica

Binomial name
- Daphnella thygatrica Melvill & Standen, 1903

= Daphnella thygatrica =

Species of gastropod

Daphnella thygatrica is a species of sea snail, a marine gastropod mollusc in the family Raphitomidae.

== Description ==
The length of the shell attains 7 mm, its diameter 2.5 mm.

The small, fusiform shell is twisted. It is straw-coloured with faint rufous longitudinal tints. It contains seven whorls, of which three decussate whorls in the protoconch. The body whorl is doubly keeled. The aperture is oblong. The outer lip is thin. The sinus is inconspicuous. The columellar margin is incrassate. The wide siphonal canal is only slightly produced.

== Distribution ==
This marine species occurs in the Gulf of Oman.
