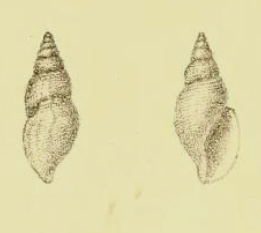
- Original image of Daphnella diluta

Scientific classification
- Kingdom: Animalia
- Phylum: Mollusca
- Class: Gastropoda
- Subclass: Caenogastropoda
- Order: Neogastropoda
- Superfamily: Conoidea
- Family: Raphitomidae
- Genus: Daphnella
- Species: D. diluta

Binomial name
- Daphnella diluta Sowerby III, 1896

Synonyms
- Daphnella (Daphnella) diluta Sowerby III, 1897

= Daphnella diluta =

Species of gastropod

Daphnella diluta is a species of sea snail, a marine gastropod mollusk in the family Raphitomidae.

== Description ==
The length of the shell attains 10 mm, its diameter 4.25 mm.

The white oblong-ovate shell is sparsely maculate with red dots. The spire is acutely conical. The shell contains 6 convex, rounded whorls, subtly spirally striated. The large body whorl is oval and not rostrate. The aperture is wide. The outer lip is thin and arcuate, moderately sinuous below.

== Distribution ==
This marine species is endemic to Australia and occurs off South Australia.
