= Daphnella inangulata =

Scientific classification
- Kingdom: Animalia
- Phylum: Mollusca
- Class: Gastropoda
- Subclass: Caenogastropoda
- Order: Neogastropoda
- Superfamily: Conoidea
- Family: Raphitomidae
- Genus: Daphnella
- Species: D. inangulata

Binomial name
- Daphnella inangulata B.-Q. Li & X.-Z. Li, 2014

Species of gastropod

Daphnella inangulata is a species of sea snail, a marine gastropod mollusk in the family Raphitomidae.

== Distribution ==
This marine species occurs in the China Seas.
