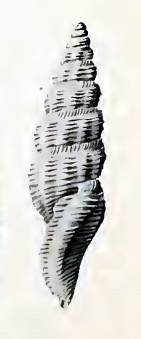
- Original image of a shell of Daphnella sigmastoma

Scientific classification
- Kingdom: Animalia
- Phylum: Mollusca
- Class: Gastropoda
- Subclass: Caenogastropoda
- Order: Neogastropoda
- Superfamily: Conoidea
- Family: Raphitomidae
- Genus: Daphnella
- Species: D. sigmastoma

Binomial name
- Daphnella sigmastoma Hedley, 1922

Synonyms
- Daphnella arctata Reeve, 1845; Daphnella arctata Brazier, 1876; Daphnella (Daphnella) sigmastoma Hedley, 1922; Clathurella arctata Brazier, 1876 (not Pleurotoma arctata Reeve, 1845)

= Daphnella sigmastoma =

Species of gastropod

Daphnella sigmastoma is a species of sea snail, a marine gastropod mollusk in the family Raphitomidae.

== Description ==
The length of the shell attains 8.5 mm, its diameter 3 mm.

(Original description) The small shell has an elongate-fusiform shape. Its colour is uniform pale yellow, except the apex, which is buff. The shell contains ten rounded whorls, including those of the elevated protoconch. The fasciole is narrow, excavate, and crossed by close-set scales. The radials are arcuate round-backed riblets, parted by interstices of equal breadth, fading out on the base, absent behind the varix, amounting to thirteen on the antepenultimate whorl The spirals are close narrow threads, alternating in size on the peripheral area, and over-riding the riblets. On the body whorl there are twenty-five, of which ten ascend the penultimate. The aperture is fortified by a broad and high varix, from which a free limb reaches across the aperture, reducing the width of the aperture. The sinus is a long and narrow fold. Within the outer lip and beneath the sinus are two small denticules. The columella is perpendicular. The siphonal canal is short and wide.

== Distribution ==
This marine species is endemic to Australia and occurs off Queensland.
