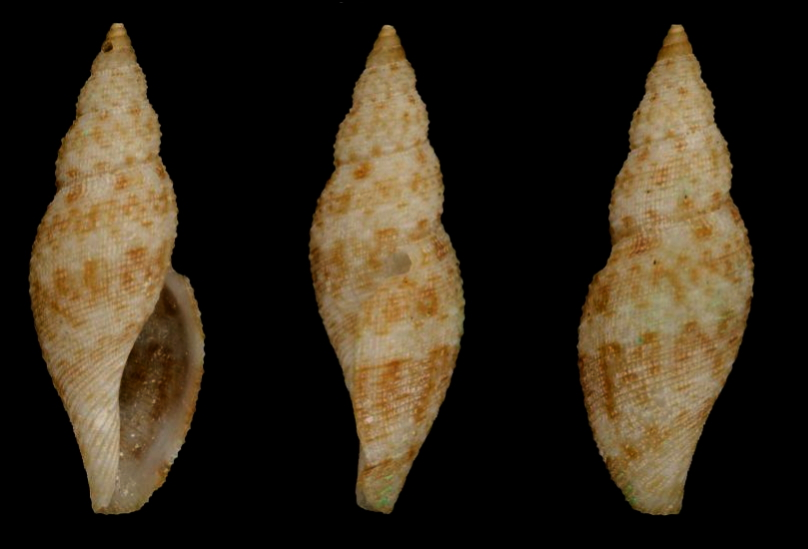
- Shell of Daphnella margaretae (holotype at the Smithsonian Institution)

Scientific classification
- Kingdom: Animalia
- Phylum: Mollusca
- Class: Gastropoda
- Subclass: Caenogastropoda
- Order: Neogastropoda
- Superfamily: Conoidea
- Family: Raphitomidae
- Genus: Daphnella
- Species: D. margaretae

Binomial name
- Daphnella margaretae Lyons, 1972

Synonyms
- Daphnella (Paradaphne) margaretae Lyons, 1972; Daphnella antillana Espinosa & Fernández-Garcés, 1990

= Daphnella margaretae =

Species of gastropod

Daphnella margaretae is a species of sea snail, a marine gastropod mollusk in the family Raphitomidae.

== Description ==
The length of the shell varies between 8 mm and 18 mm.

== Distribution ==
D. margaretae can be found in Atlantic and Caribbean waters, ranging from the eastern coast of Florida to Brazil.
