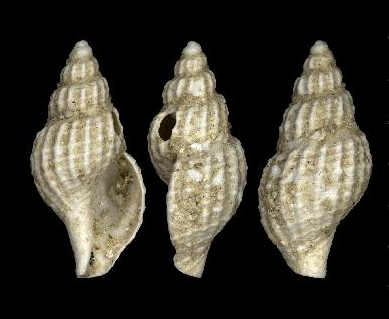
- Shell of † Daphnella ponteleviensis (specimen at MNHN, Paris)

Scientific classification
- Kingdom: Animalia
- Phylum: Mollusca
- Class: Gastropoda
- Subclass: Caenogastropoda
- Order: Neogastropoda
- Superfamily: Conoidea
- Family: Raphitomidae
- Genus: Daphnella
- Species: D. ponteleviensis

Binomial name
- Daphnella ponteleviensis Cossmann, 1896

= Daphnella ponteleviensis =

Extinct species of gastropod

Daphnella ponteleviensis is an extinct species of sea snail, a marine gastropod mollusk in the family Raphitomidae.

== Distribution ==
Fossils of this marine species were found in Miocene strata of Loire-et-Cher, France.
