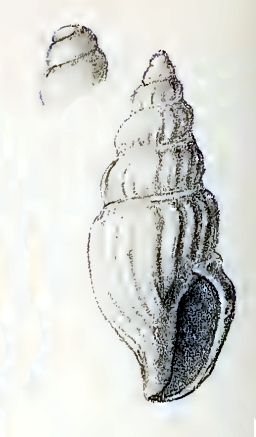
- Original image of a shell (and protoconch) of Daphnella intercedens

Scientific classification
- Kingdom: Animalia
- Phylum: Mollusca
- Class: Gastropoda
- Subclass: Caenogastropoda
- Order: Neogastropoda
- Superfamily: Conoidea
- Family: Raphitomidae
- Genus: Daphnella
- Species: D. intercedens

Binomial name
- Daphnella intercedens (Melvill, 1923)

Synonyms
- Mangelia intercedens J.C. Melvill, 1923

= Daphnella intercedens =

Species of gastropod

Daphnella intercedens is a species of sea snail, a marine gastropod mollusk in the family Raphitomidae.

== Description ==
The length of the shell is 5 mm, its diameter 2 mm.

(Original description) The small, delicate, thin shell has a fusiform shape. it is white with a partial pale yellow suffusion. It contains 7 whorls, of which three are in the protoconch. These are globose, semidiaphanous, white, shining, the third being microscopically longitudinally striate. The subsequent whorls, all impressed suturally, are closely longitudinally ribbed. These ribs are close, shining, and smooth, obliquely flexuose, with the interstices finely spirally striate. The aperture is ovate-oblong. The outer lip is thin, but hardly adult. The columellar margin is oblique. The siphonal canal is abbreviate.

== Distribution ==
This marine species occurs off Cuba.
