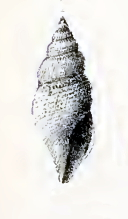
- Original image of a shell of Daphnella dea

Scientific classification
- Kingdom: Animalia
- Phylum: Mollusca
- Class: Gastropoda
- Subclass: Caenogastropoda
- Order: Neogastropoda
- Superfamily: Conoidea
- Family: Raphitomidae
- Genus: Daphnella
- Species: D. dea

Binomial name
- Daphnella dea Melvill, 1904

= Daphnella dea =

Species of gastropod

Daphnella dea is a species of sea snail, a marine gastropod mollusk in the family Raphitomidae.

== Description ==
The length of the shell attains 11 mm, its diameter 4 mm.

This thin, inflated, fusiform shell is almost colourless. It contains 8-9 whorls, of which four in the protoconch. These are ochreous and show a decussating sculpture of the finest character. The apex is smooth and vitreous. The subsequent whorls are inflated and decussate. The longitudinals are oblique and tenuous. The aperture is oblong. The thin outer lip hardly exhibits any sinus. The siphonal canal is short.

== Distribution ==
This marine species occurs in the Gulf of Oman .
