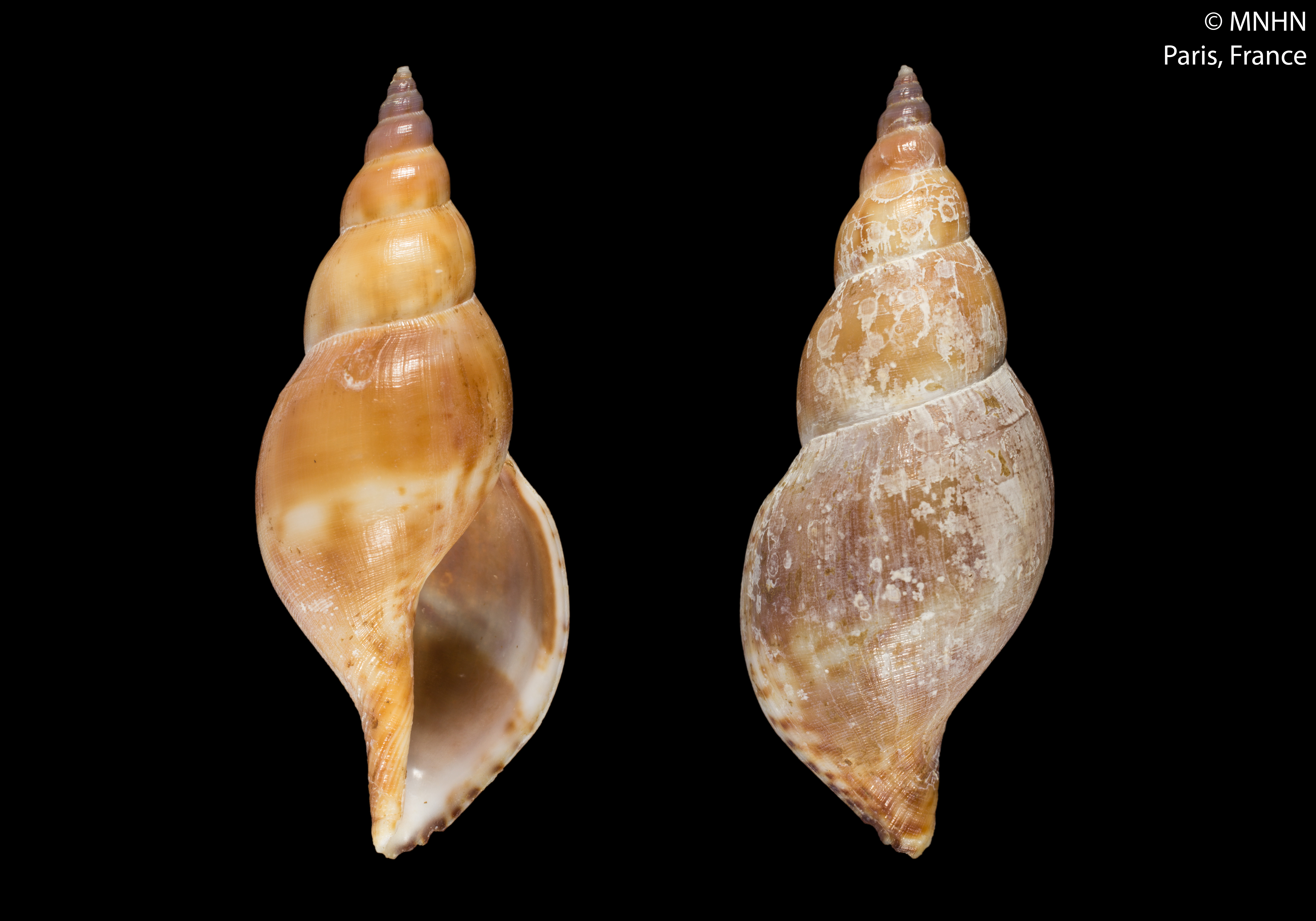
- Daphnella itonis

Scientific classification
- Kingdom: Animalia
- Phylum: Mollusca
- Class: Gastropoda
- Subclass: Caenogastropoda
- Order: Neogastropoda
- Superfamily: Conoidea
- Family: Raphitomidae
- Genus: Daphnella
- Species: D. itonis

Binomial name
- Daphnella itonis Sysoev & Bouchet, 2001

= Daphnella itonis =

Species of gastropod

Daphnella itonis is a species of sea snail, a marine gastropod mollusc in the family Raphitomidae.

== Distribution ==
This marine species occurs off New Caledonia, the Philippines and Japan.
