= Daphnella scabrata =

Scientific classification
- Kingdom: Animalia
- Phylum: Mollusca
- Class: Gastropoda
- Subclass: Caenogastropoda
- Order: Neogastropoda
- Superfamily: Conoidea
- Family: Raphitomidae
- Genus: Daphnella
- Species: D. scabrata

Binomial name
- Daphnella scabrata (E.A. Smith, 1888)

Synonyms
- Pleurotoma (Clathurella) scabrata E. A. Smith, 1888

Species of gastropod

Daphnella scabrata is a species of sea snail, a marine gastropod mollusk in the family Raphitomidae.

This is a taxon inquirendum.

== Description ==
The length of the shell attains 15 mm; its diameter 5½ mm.

(Original description in Latin) The shell is fusiform-ovate, yellowish-brown. It is encircled around the middle of the whorls by one to two milky-white lines. There are nine whorls: the upper two to three are finely and obliquely reticulated, while the remaining whorls are moderately convex and furnished with about sixteen ribs, which on the body whorl continue almost to the base. They are also striated with growth lines and provided with six to seven fine spiral ridges (in the body whorl up to twenty-seven), with other intervening striae. The aperture is brownish and equals one third of the total length. The outer lip is slightly thickened and above, near the suture, it shows a small semicircular sinus. The columella is twisted, and the siphonal canal is rather short and narrow.

The few opaque lacteous lines encircling the whorls, chiefly near their middle, are not very distinct. The lines of growth are rather strongly developed, and on crossing the transverse lirations give them a roughened or subgranose appearance. The outer lip in the three specimens examined is scarcely perfect, and possibly therefore it may be lirate within.

[3]
