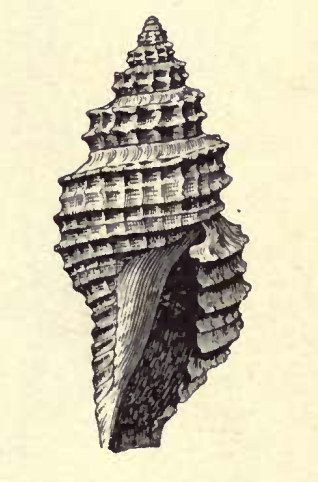
- Original image of a shell of Daphnella corbicula

Scientific classification
- Kingdom: Animalia
- Phylum: Mollusca
- Class: Gastropoda
- Subclass: Caenogastropoda
- Order: Neogastropoda
- Superfamily: Conoidea
- Family: Raphitomidae
- Genus: Daphnella
- Species: D. corbicula

Binomial name
- Daphnella corbicula (Dall, 1889)

Synonyms
- Mangilia corbicula Dall, 1889

= Daphnella corbicula =

Species of gastropod

Daphnella corbicula is a species of sea snail, a marine gastropod mollusk in the family Raphitomidae.

== Description ==
The length of the shell varies between 7 mm and 12 mm.

(Original description) The yellowish shell shows pale brown flammules. The high and slender shell has a protoconch of three whorls and five or more subsequent whorls. The sculpture on the early whorls consists of two very strong elevated threads, at a later time there are two intercalary, not quite so strong. On the body whorl there are about ten strong primaries in all, partly on the back of the siphonal canal, about five intercalaries on the body of the whorl, and on all the unoccupied area very fine numerous granulous or frosty spiral threads. On the fasciole there are no other spirals. The transverse sculpture consists of fine sharp incremental lines, which produce the shagreening of the tertiary spirals; and of numerous elevated rounded threads, which reticulate the stronger spirals, induce little nodes at the intersections, and extend from the front margin of the fasciole forward over the whole whorl, disappearing only on the back of the siphonal canal. The interstices are deep, and nearly square. The whorls are rounded, shouldered by the strong posterior primary spiral thread . The siphonal canal is nearly straight, very wide, hardly differentiable from the aperture. The columella is nearly straight with little callus. The outer lip is thin and crenulated by the sculpture. The notch at the suture is narrow, and about 1.0 mm. deep. The suture is appressed and not very distinct.

== Distribution ==
D. corbicula can be found in Atlantic waters, ranging from the coast of North Carolina south to Brazil.
