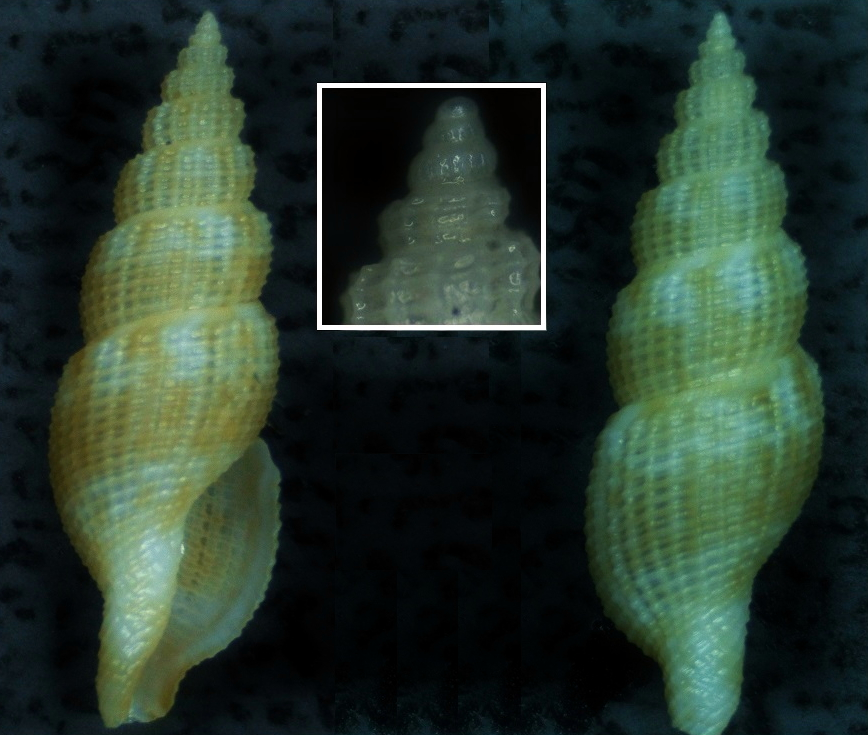
- Shell of Daphnella boholensis

Scientific classification
- Kingdom: Animalia
- Phylum: Mollusca
- Class: Gastropoda
- Subclass: Caenogastropoda
- Order: Neogastropoda
- Superfamily: Conoidea
- Family: Raphitomidae
- Genus: Daphnella
- Species: D. boholensis

Binomial name
- Daphnella boholensis (Reeve, 1843)

Synonyms
- Pleurotoma boholensis Reeve, 1845

= Daphnella boholensis =

Species of gastropod

Daphnella boholensis, common name the Bohol pleurotoma, is a species of sea snail, a marine gastropod mollusk in the family Raphitomidae.

== Description ==
(Original description) The rather elongated shell is thin and somewhat transparent. Its color is whitish, rather indistinctly streaked or waved with yellow. It contains eight whorls. These are transversely lineated and ridged, very finely reticulated also with striae. A number of lines and ridges run transversely across the whorls, but none longitudinally. The columella is spirally twisted. The siphonal canal is very short, a little recurved. The outer lip is simple and sharp. The sinus is small.
