= Daphnella annulata =

Scientific classification
- Kingdom: Animalia
- Phylum: Mollusca
- Class: Gastropoda
- Subclass: Caenogastropoda
- Order: Neogastropoda
- Superfamily: Conoidea
- Family: Raphitomidae
- Genus: Daphnella
- Species: D. annulata

Binomial name
- Daphnella annulata Thiele, 1925

Species of gastropod

Daphnella annulata is a species of sea snail, a marine gastropod mollusk in the family Raphitomidae.

== Description ==
The length of the shell attains 3.3 mm, its diameter is 1.5 mm.

== Distribution ==
This marine species is found in the Nias Channel, Sumatra, Indonesia.
