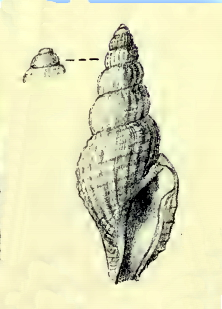
- Image of a shell of Daphnella arcta

Scientific classification
- Kingdom: Animalia
- Phylum: Mollusca
- Class: Gastropoda
- Subclass: Caenogastropoda
- Order: Neogastropoda
- Superfamily: Conoidea
- Family: Raphitomidae
- Genus: Daphnella
- Species: D. arcta

Binomial name
- Daphnella arcta (E.A. Smith, 1884)

Synonyms
- Daphnella (Daphnella) arcta (Smith, 1884); Mangilia arcta E.A. Smith, 1884; Pleurotoma arcta E.A. Smith, 1884

= Daphnella arcta =

Species of gastropod

Daphnella arcta is a species of sea snail, a marine gastropod mollusk in the family Raphitomidae.

== Description ==
This is a narrow cytharoid species, evidently a near ally of the protean Paraclathurella gracilenta, Reeve, 1843. The granulately cancellate third whorl hints at identity with this, and also the form of the aperture and outer lip. But the mature shell is more abbreviate and considerably smaller. As E.A. Smith points out, there is much variation in the colour; some specimens are white, others reddish, and we have examples from Hong Kong of a dark greenish brown.

== Distribution ==
This marine species occurs in the Persian Gulf and off Japan.
