= Daphnella supercostata =

Scientific classification
- Kingdom: Animalia
- Phylum: Mollusca
- Class: Gastropoda
- Subclass: Caenogastropoda
- Order: Neogastropoda
- Superfamily: Conoidea
- Family: Raphitomidae
- Genus: Daphnella
- Species: D. supercostata

Binomial name
- Daphnella supercostata (E. A. Smith, 1882)

Synonyms
- Daphnella (Daphnella) stiphra (E.A. Smith, 1882); Pleurotoma (Daphnella) supercostata E. A. Smith, 1882 (original combination); Vexiguraleus supercostata (E. A. Smith, 1882)

Species of gastropod

Daphnella supercostata is a species of sea snail, a marine gastropod mollusk in the family Raphitomidae.

== Description ==
The length of the shell attains 13 mm, its diameter 5.5 mm.

The small, whitish golden yellow shell has an ovate-fusiform shape. It contains 6 1/3 whorls. The convex whorls are slightly excavated near the suture. The first 1 1/2 whorls are smooth. The upper ones only are longitudinally ribbed (about 10). And the minute striation forms a very fine reticulation over the entire surface. These are the chief characteristics of this very distinct species. The body whorl is tumid and contracted at the base. The aperture is slightly longer than the spire. The columella stands almost straight. The siphonal canal is short and slightly recurved. The outer lip is markedly sinuated at the suture and incrassate outwards.

== Distribution ==
This marine species occurs off Japan.
