= Daphnella effusa =

Scientific classification
- Kingdom: Animalia
- Phylum: Mollusca
- Class: Gastropoda
- Subclass: Caenogastropoda
- Order: Neogastropoda
- Superfamily: Conoidea
- Family: Raphitomidae
- Genus: Daphnella
- Species: D. effusa

Binomial name
- Daphnella effusa Sowerby III, 1896

Species of gastropod

Daphnella effusa is a species of sea snail, a marine gastropod mollusc in the family Raphitomidae.

== Description ==
The length of the shell attains 15.5 mm, its diameter 5.5 mm.

The graceful, reddish brown shell is much effused. The whorls are narrow and elongate. The sutures are impressed. The shell is spirally striate, decussated by growth lines. The outer lip is thin and scarcely sinuate.

The species was described from a single broken specimen. The holotype has not been found.

== Distribution ==
This marine species was found in the Pacific Ocean off Neeah Bay, Washington, USA.
