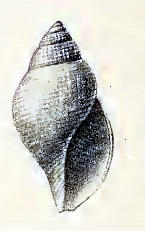
- Original image of a shell of Daphnella buccinulum

Scientific classification
- Kingdom: Animalia
- Phylum: Mollusca
- Class: Gastropoda
- Subclass: Caenogastropoda
- Order: Neogastropoda
- Superfamily: Conoidea
- Family: Raphitomidae
- Genus: Daphnella
- Species: D. buccinulum

Binomial name
- Daphnella buccinulum Melvill & Standen, 1903

= Daphnella buccinulum =

Species of gastropod

Daphnella buccinulum, common names the botanic turrid and Botany Bay turrid, is a species of sea snail, a marine gastropod mollusc in the family Raphitomidae.

== Description ==
The length of the shell attains 7 mm, its diameter 3.75 mm.

An inflated Buccinoid species, very delicate and beautifully cancellate throughout. It contains seven whorls of which three in the protoconch. The aperture is oblong. The outer lip is thin. The sinus is indistinct.

== Distribution ==
This marine species occurs in the Gulf of Oman.
