= Daphnella nobilis =

Scientific classification
- Kingdom: Animalia
- Phylum: Mollusca
- Class: Gastropoda
- Subclass: Caenogastropoda
- Order: Neogastropoda
- Superfamily: Conoidea
- Family: Raphitomidae
- Genus: Daphnella
- Species: D. nobilis

Binomial name
- Daphnella nobilis Kira, 1959

Synonyms
- Daphnella (Daphnella) nobilis Kira, T., 1959; Daphnella scalaris Møller, 1842

Species of gastropod

Daphnella nobilis is a species of sea snail, a marine gastropod mollusk in the family Raphitomidae.

== Description ==
The length of the shell varies between 15 mm and 27 mm.

== Distribution ==
This marine species occurs off the Philippines and Japan.
