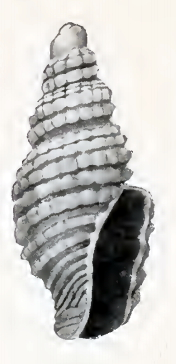
- Image of a shell of Mangelia minuscula

Scientific classification
- Kingdom: Animalia
- Phylum: Mollusca
- Class: Gastropoda
- Subclass: Caenogastropoda
- Order: Neogastropoda
- Superfamily: Conoidea
- Family: Mangeliidae
- Genus: Mangelia
- Species: M. minuscula

Binomial name
- Mangelia minuscula (E.A. Smith, 1910)

Synonyms
- Daphnella minuscula E. A. Smith, 1910 (original combination); Mangelia gisna P. Bartsch, 1915; Mangilia minuscula Turton, 1932

= Mangelia minuscula =

Species of gastropod

Mangelia minuscula is a species of sea snail, a marine gastropod mollusk in the family Mangeliidae.

== Description ==
The length of the shell attains 3.1 mm, its diameter 1.4 mm.

The small shell is golden brown. The protoconch contains 1½ smooth whorls, forming a rather elevated apex. The subsequent whorls are well rounded, shouldered at the summit, and marked by strong spiral cords, of which 3 occur upon the first two whorls between the sutures, and 4 upon the penultimate whorl. The base of the body whorl is marked by eight additional cords, which equal those between the sutures in strength and have about the same spacing. The spaces between these spiral cords are about as wide as the cords. In addition to the spiral cords, the whorls are marked by slender axial ribs, which are slightly protractive. Of these ribs, 12 occur upon the first, 16 upon the second and 28 upon the last whorl. The junctions of the axial ribs with the spiral cords form slender tubercles, while the spaces enclosed between them appear as well rounded, strongly impressed pits. On the anterior half of the base, the axial riblets become much enfeebled, so that here the pitting is less apparent. The sutures are strongly constricted. The aperture is moderately large, decidedly channeled posteriorly and anteriorly. The outer lip is thin, showing the external sculpture within. The inner edge of the columella and the parietal wall is covered with a thin callus.

Mangelia gisna P. Bartsch, 1915 is a strongly nodulose form of Mangelia minuscula.

== Distribution ==
This marine species occurs off Port Elizabeth, South Africa.
