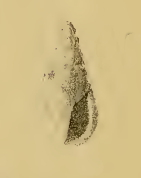
- Original image of a shell of Daphnella terina

Scientific classification
- Kingdom: Animalia
- Phylum: Mollusca
- Class: Gastropoda
- Subclass: Caenogastropoda
- Order: Neogastropoda
- Superfamily: Conoidea
- Family: Raphitomidae
- Genus: Daphnella
- Species: D. terina

Binomial name
- Daphnella terina Melvill & Standen, 1896

Synonyms
- Daphnella (Daphnella) terina Melvill & Standen, 1896

= Daphnella terina =

Species of gastropod

Daphnella terina is a species of sea snail, a marine gastropod mollusk in the family Raphitomidae.

== Description ==
The length of the shell attains 5 mm, its diameter 2.5 mm.

The delicate, white shell has a fusiform shape. It contains six whorls. The upper ones are turreted and finely striated. The subsequent whorls show indistinct longitudinal ribs, except on the body whorl. The body whorl shows brown spots below the suture and brown flames at the back and below. The narrow aperture is oblique. The outer lip is simple. The sinus is small.

== Distribution ==
This marine species occurs off the Fiji Islands, Loyalty Islands, New Caledonia and the Gulf of Carpentaria to Queensland, Australia
