= R. nivea =

R. nivea may refer to:

- Raphitoma nivea, a sea snail species
- Rissoina nivea, a sea snail species
- Rocroithys nivea, a sea snail species

== See also ==
- Nivea (disambiguation)
