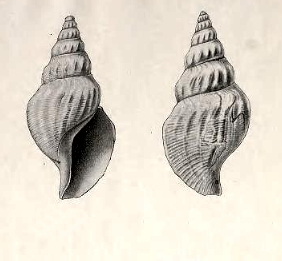
- Original image of a shell of Pontiothauma pacei

Scientific classification
- Kingdom: Animalia
- Phylum: Mollusca
- Class: Gastropoda
- Subclass: Caenogastropoda
- Order: Neogastropoda
- Superfamily: Conoidea
- Family: Raphitomidae
- Genus: Pontiothauma
- Species: P. pacei

Binomial name
- Pontiothauma pacei E.A. Smith, 1906

= Pontiothauma pacei =

Species of gastropod

Pontiothauma pacei is a species of sea snail, a marine gastropod mollusk in the family Raphitomidae.

== Description ==
The length of the shell attains 60 mm, its diameter 27 mm.

The wide, fusiform shell is white. It contains about ten whorls (the upper ones are broken off). The remaining whorls are concave on top and somewhat angulate in the middle. They contain oblique, slender ribs and delicate, flexuous spiral lirae with increasing strength. The body whorl is slightly inflated and narrow at its top. The aperture is white within and measures about half the length of the shell. The thin outer lip shows a wide, but not deep sinus at its top. It is widely arcuate at its middle. The columella is smooth and contains a white, horny callus. The short siphonal canal is wide, oblique and somewhat recurved.

This species differs from Pontiothauma mirabile in having the whorls angulated in the middle, in the finer spiral lirae, more slender costae. The ribs are nineteen in number upon the body whorl and only slightly developed in the concavity or upper part of the whorls.

The animal is apparently without eyes or operculum.
