= Stilla anomala =

Scientific classification
- Kingdom: Animalia
- Phylum: Mollusca
- Class: Gastropoda
- Subclass: Caenogastropoda
- Order: Neogastropoda
- Superfamily: Conoidea
- Family: Raphitomidae
- Genus: Stilla
- Species: S. anomala

Binomial name
- Stilla anomala Powell, 1955

Species of gastropod

Stilla anomala is a species of sea snail, a marine gastropod mollusk in the family Raphitomidae.

== Description ==
The length of the shell attains 1.6 mm, its diameter 0.9 mm.

== Distribution ==
This marine species is endemic to New Zealand and occurs off Otago, South Island, N of Auckland Islands and off Snares Islands.
