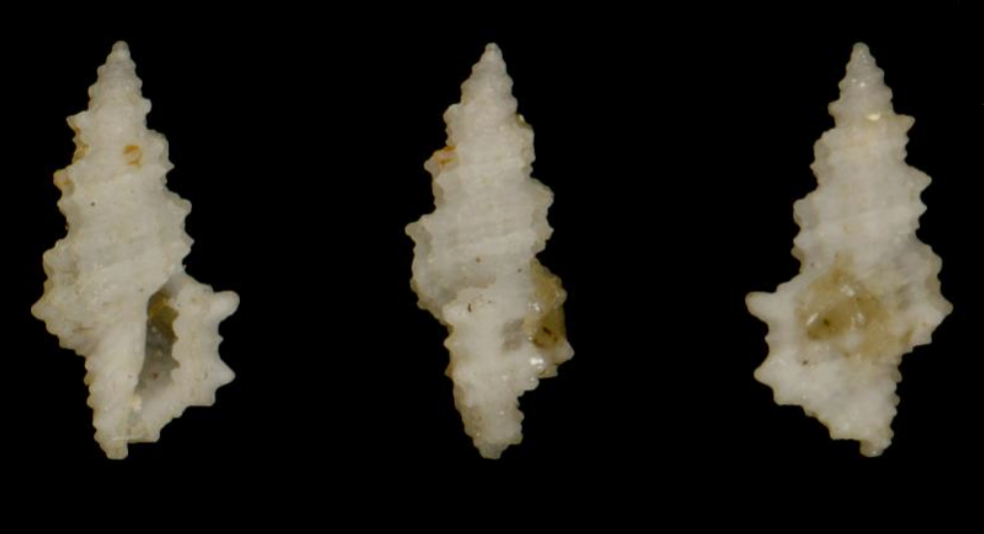
- Shell of Microdaphne morrisoni (holotype at the Smithsonian Institution)

Scientific classification
- Kingdom: Animalia
- Phylum: Mollusca
- Class: Gastropoda
- Subclass: Caenogastropoda
- Order: Neogastropoda
- Superfamily: Conoidea
- Family: Raphitomidae
- Genus: Microdaphne
- Species: M. morrisoni

Binomial name
- Microdaphne morrisoni Rehder, 1980

= Microdaphne morrisoni =

Species of gastropod

Microdaphne morrisoni is a species of sea snail, a marine gastropod mollusk in the family Raphitomidae.

== Description ==
The length of the shell varies between 2.5 mm and 3 mm.

== Distribution ==
This marine species was found off the Tuamotu Islands, Vanuatu, Papua New Guinea, and the Philippines.
