= Tuskaroria ultraabyssalis =

Scientific classification
- Kingdom: Animalia
- Phylum: Mollusca
- Class: Gastropoda
- Subclass: Caenogastropoda
- Order: Neogastropoda
- Superfamily: Conoidea
- Family: Raphitomidae
- Genus: Tuskaroria
- Species: T. ultraabyssalis

Binomial name
- Tuskaroria ultraabyssalis Sysoev, 1988

Species of gastropod

Tuskaroria ultraabyssalis is a species of sea snail, a marine gastropod mollusk in the family Raphitomidae.

== Distribution ==
This deep-sea species was found off the Kurile-Kamchatka Trench, Northern Pacific.
