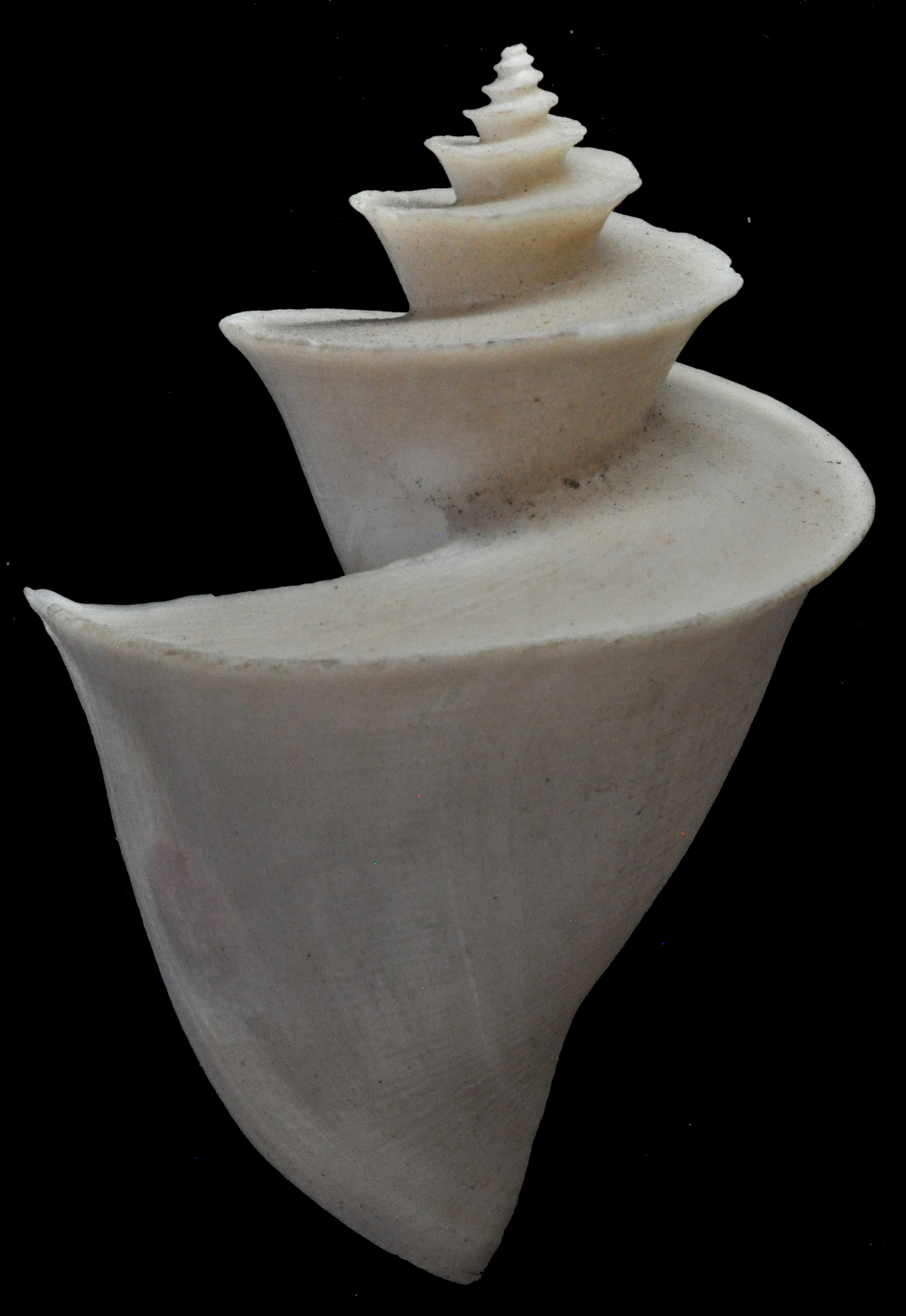
- Shell of Thatcheria janae (paratype at the MNHN, Paris)

Scientific classification
- Kingdom: Animalia
- Phylum: Mollusca
- Class: Gastropoda
- Subclass: Caenogastropoda
- Order: Neogastropoda
- Superfamily: Conoidea
- Family: Raphitomidae
- Genus: Thatcheria
- Species: T. janae

Binomial name
- Thatcheria janae Lorenz & Stahlschmidt, 2019

= Thatcheria janae =

Species of gastropod

Thatcheria janae is a species of sea snail, a marine gastropod mollusk in the family Raphitomidae.

== Description ==
The length of the shell attains 67 mm.

== Distribution ==
This marine species occurs off Western Australia.
