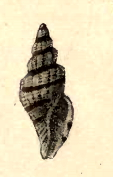
- Shell of Kuroshiodaphne fuscobalteata

Scientific classification
- Kingdom: Animalia
- Phylum: Mollusca
- Class: Gastropoda
- Subclass: Caenogastropoda
- Order: Neogastropoda
- Family: Raphitomidae
- Genus: Kuroshiodaphne
- Species: K. fuscobalteata

Binomial name
- Kuroshiodaphne fuscobalteata (E.A. Smith, 1879)

Synonyms
- Clathurella fiscobalteata (E.A. Smith, 1879); Daphnella fuscobalteata E.A. Smith, 1879 (original combination)

= Kuroshiodaphne fuscobalteata =

Species of gastropod

Kuroshiodaphne fuscobalteata is a species of sea snail, a marine gastropod mollusk in the family Raphitomidae.

== Description ==
The length of the shell varies between 5 mm and 12 mm.

The shell is yellowish, pale violet or lilac towards the apex, banded with light brown, one band at the top of the whorls darker than the rest. The shell contains about 16 rib, crossed by fine lirae . The outer lip is thickened within and exteriorly, thin at the extreme edge, smooth interiorly. The small sinus is sutural.

The shell contains 9 ? whorls (apex broken), obliquely sloping at the upper part, and slightly convex at the sides. They are strengthened with longitudinal suberect rounded costae, whereof there are 12 on the penultimate whorl and about 16 on the body whorl (those towards the outer lip being finer), gradually vanishing a little below the middle. Between the more slender ribs there are a few fine intermediate ones, but this may only be an individual peculiarity. The whorls are also transversely lirate. Lirae of different thicknesses, numerous, raised equally between and upon the costae, fewer and coarser upon the upper whorls, and about 30 on the body whorl. The aperture is rather narrow, less than half the length of the shell, exhibiting the same banded colours as the exterior. The outer lip is thickened within and exteriorly, thin at the extreme edge, smooth interiorly. The sinus is small at the suture. The columella is simple, obliquely flexuous. The siphonal canal is a trifle oblique and slightly recurved.

== Distribution ==
This marine species occurs off Japan and the Philippines.
