= Glyphostomoides queenslandica =

Scientific classification
- Kingdom: Animalia
- Phylum: Mollusca
- Class: Gastropoda
- Subclass: Caenogastropoda
- Order: Neogastropoda
- Superfamily: Conoidea
- Family: Raphitomidae
- Genus: Glyphostomoides
- Species: G. queenslandica

Binomial name
- Glyphostomoides queenslandica (Shuto, 1983)

Synonyms
- Philbertia (Glyphostomoides) queenslandica Shuto, 1983

Species of gastropod

Glyphostomoides queenslandica is a species of sea snail, a marine gastropod mollusk in the family Raphitomidae.

== Distribution ==
This marine species occurs off Queensland, Australia
