= Maoridaphne haroldi =

Scientific classification
- Kingdom: Animalia
- Phylum: Mollusca
- Class: Gastropoda
- Subclass: Caenogastropoda
- Order: Neogastropoda
- Superfamily: Conoidea
- Family: Raphitomidae
- Genus: †Maoridaphne
- Species: †M. haroldi

Binomial name
- †Maoridaphne haroldi Powell, 1942

Extinct species of gastropod

Maoridaphne haroldi is an extinct species of sea snail, a marine gastropod mollusk in the family Raphitomidae. Fossils of this species were found in Miocene strata in New Zealand; age range: 19.0 to 15.9 Ma.
