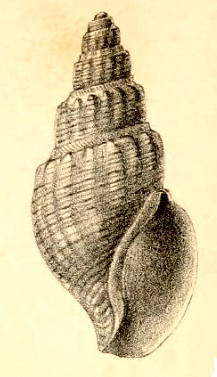
- Original image of a shell of Pontiothauma abyssicola

Scientific classification
- Kingdom: Animalia
- Phylum: Mollusca
- Class: Gastropoda
- Subclass: Caenogastropoda
- Order: Neogastropoda
- Superfamily: Conoidea
- Family: Raphitomidae
- Genus: Pontiothauma
- Species: P. abyssicola

Binomial name
- Pontiothauma abyssicola E.A. Smith, 1895

= Pontiothauma abyssicola =

Species of gastropod

Pontiothauma abyssicola is a species of sea snail, a marine gastropod mollusk in the family Raphitomidae.

== Description ==
The length of the shell attains 50 mm, its diameter 24 mm.

(Original description) The elongate, turreted shell is rather solid, imperforate. Its color is white, the epidermis a thin, pale olive-green. The shell contains six whorls. The depression or concavity at the upper part of the whorls produces a marginate appearance at the suture, and upon the margination the lines of growth are slightly puckered. The spiral striae are somewhat deep and have rather a regular look to the naked eye. The nodose plications at the angulation above do not extend far downwards, but soon become obsolete, so that the lower part of the whorls has a nearly even surface. The white aperture is oblong and measures just under half the length of the shell. The siphonal canal is very short and wide. It is slightly recurved. The thin outer lip is slightly sinuate under the excavation of the suture. The white columella is callous, slightly arcuate in the middle and below obliquely twisted.

Like the type of the genus, this species has neither radula nor operculum. It differs, however, in possessing eyes.

== Distribution ==
This marine species occurs in the Bay of Bengal.
