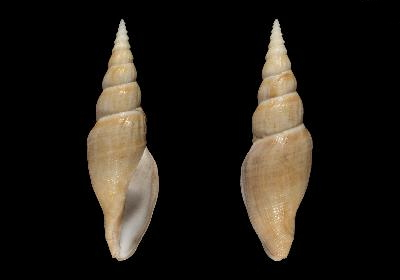
- Shell of Spergo parunculis (holotype in the MNHN, Paris)

Scientific classification
- Kingdom: Animalia
- Phylum: Mollusca
- Class: Gastropoda
- Subclass: Caenogastropoda
- Order: Neogastropoda
- Superfamily: Conoidea
- Family: Raphitomidae
- Genus: Spergo
- Species: S. parunculis

Binomial name
- Spergo parunculis Stahlschmidt, Chino & Fraussen, 2015

= Spergo parunculis =

Species of gastropod

Spergo parunculis is a species of sea snail, a marine gastropod mollusk in the family Raphitomidae.

== Description ==
The shell reaches a length of 84 mm.

== Distribution ==
This marine species occurs in the Mozambique Channel.
