= Thatcheria liratula =

Scientific classification
- Kingdom: Animalia
- Phylum: Mollusca
- Class: Gastropoda
- Subclass: Caenogastropoda
- Order: Neogastropoda
- Superfamily: Conoidea
- Family: Raphitomidae
- Genus: Thatcheria
- Species: T. liratula

Binomial name
- Thatcheria liratula (Powell, 1942)

Synonyms
- † Waitara liratula Powell, 1942

Extinct species of gastropod

Thatcheria liratula is an extinct species of sea snail, a marine gastropod mollusk in the family Raphitomidae.

== Distribution ==
Fossils of this marine species were found in Lower Pliocene strata in New Zealand.
