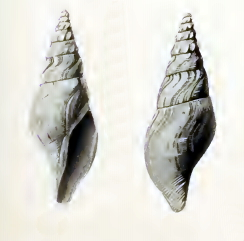
- Shell of Typhlosyrinx supracostata

Scientific classification
- Kingdom: Animalia
- Phylum: Mollusca
- Class: Gastropoda
- Subclass: Caenogastropoda
- Order: Neogastropoda
- Superfamily: Conoidea
- Family: Raphitomidae
- Genus: Typhlosyrinx; Thiele, 1925

Type species
- Pleurotoma (Leucosyrinx) vepallida Martens, 1902

Species
- See text

= Typhlosyrinx =

Genus of gastropods

Typhlosyrinx is a genus of sea snails, marine gastropod mollusks in the family Raphitomidae.

This genus was created by Johannes Thiele in 1925 to accommodate Pleurotorna vepallida Martens, 1902. The genus remains little known because of the original scarcity of specimens in the museums. Deap-sea expeditions have since recovered more than 200 additional specimens from the South-East Asia and the South-West Pacific, mainly in the Muséum National d'Histoire Naturelle, Paris

== Species ==
Species within the genus Typhlosyrinx include:

- Typhlosyrinx neocaledoniensis Bouchet & Sysoev, 2001
- Typhlosyrinx panamica Bouchet & Sysoev, 2001
- Typhlosyrinx praecipua (E. A. Smith, 1899)
- Typhlosyrinx supracostata (Schepman, 1913)
- Typhlosyrinx vepallida (Martens, 1902)

Species bought into synonymy

- Typhlosyrinx chrysopelex Barnard, 1963: synonym of Gymnobela chrysopelex (Barnard, 1963) (original combination)
- Typhlosyrinx pyrropelex Barnard, 1963: synonym of Austrobela pyrropelex (Barnard, 1963) (original combination)
- Typhlosyrinx subrosea Barnard, 1963 accepted as Xanthodaphne subrosea (Barnard, 1963) (original combination)
