= Kuroshiodaphne phaeacme =

Scientific classification
- Kingdom: Animalia
- Phylum: Mollusca
- Class: Gastropoda
- Subclass: Caenogastropoda
- Order: Neogastropoda
- Superfamily: Conoidea
- Family: Raphitomidae
- Genus: Kuroshiodaphne
- Species: K. phaeacme

Binomial name
- Kuroshiodaphne phaeacme Sysoev, 1990

Species of gastropod

Kuroshiodaphne phaeacme is a species of sea snail, a marine gastropod mollusk in the family Raphitomidae.

== Distribution ==
This marine species was found on the Naska and Sala y Gomes Ridges, Southeast Pacific
