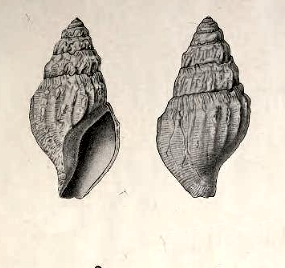
- Original image of a shell of Pontiothauma minus

Scientific classification
- Kingdom: Animalia
- Phylum: Mollusca
- Class: Gastropoda
- Subclass: Caenogastropoda
- Order: Neogastropoda
- Superfamily: Conoidea
- Family: Raphitomidae
- Genus: Pontiothauma
- Species: P. minus

Binomial name
- Pontiothauma minus E.A. Smith, 1906

= Pontiothauma minus =

Species of gastropod

Pontiothauma minus is a species of sea snail, a marine gastropod mollusk in the family Raphitomidae.

== Description ==
The length of the shell attains 30 mm, its diameter 14 mm.

The white, ovate-fusiform shell contains about eight whorls (the upper ones are broken off). The remaining whorls are concave on top and somewhat convex below. They contains slightly angulate whorls. These are about eighteen in number, somewhat acute, and do not reach to the suture above, but terminate at the depression at the upper part of the whorls. The transverse lirae are fine, contiguous, and continuous over and between the ribs. The white aperture measures about half the length of the shell. The thin outer lip is slightly sinuate at its top. The columella is smooth and contains a white callus. The siphonal canal is wide, short and somewhat recurved.

The animal is without eyes or operculum, and the foot is much flattened behind.

== Distribution ==
This marine species occurs off Sri Lanka.
