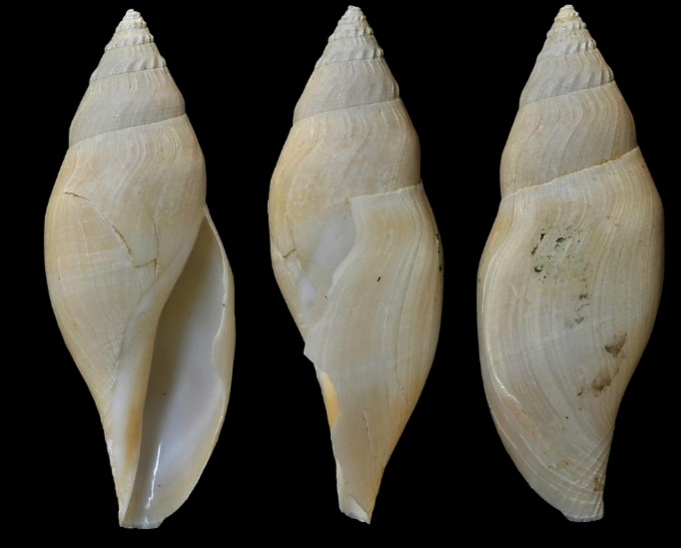
- Shell of Spergo glandiniformis (syntype at the Smithsonian Institution)

Scientific classification
- Kingdom: Animalia
- Phylum: Mollusca
- Class: Gastropoda
- Subclass: Caenogastropoda
- Order: Neogastropoda
- Superfamily: Conoidea
- Family: Raphitomidae
- Genus: Spergo
- Species: S. glandiniformis

Binomial name
- Spergo glandiniformis (Dall, 1895)

Synonyms
- Mangilia glandiniformis Dall, 1895

= Spergo glandiniformis =

Species of gastropod

Spergo glandiniformis is a species of sea snail, a marine gastropod mollusk in the family Raphitomidae.

== Description ==
The length of the shell reaches 40 mm.

(Original description) The large, slender shell is glandiniform, with a typical brown sinusigera protoconch of 3½ whorls, followed by 8 normal whorls. The color is pale madder brown, more or less zoned in harmony with lines of growth, and with a peripheral and basal spiral paler band feebly indicated. The columella in the young is stained with a darker brown, or pinkish white in the full-grown shell.

The spire is rather pointed. The apical whorls are sculptured with incised spiral grooves below the shoulder and with numerous small oblique riblets over which the grooves run. The space between the shoulder and the suture behind it is slightly impressed, smooth, or crossed by distant low sharp wrinkles, very narrow and not corresponding to the ribs. All this sculpture becomes rapidly obsolete, and on the greater part of the shell the sculpture is confined to silky lines of growth, faint traces of obscure spiral lines, and a few feeble narrow threads on the base and the siphonal canal under a pale thin epidermis. The body whorl is compressed at the periphery, as in Glandina parallela (synonym of Euglandina rosea (Férussac, 1821) ) giving the body whorl a subcylindric aspect. The suture is appressed. The aperture is long, rather narrow, internally smooth, and with very little callus on the columella or body. The outer lip is sharp, emarginate before and behind and arched forward in the middle. The columella is obscurely thickened behind, attenuated anteriorly, as long as the siphonal canal, straight, but slightly twisted. The siphonal canal and anal emargination are wide and shallow.

The animal is of a yellowish color. The columellar muscle is attached very deeply within the shell. The foot is strong. In the alcoholic specimen it is transversely wrinkled below, wrinkled and more or less granose at the sides above, the posterior end obtusely pointed. Anteriorly it is wider, with the lateral angles produced and the anterior margin double. The rostrum is quite peculiar, dilate, and squarely cut off at the end, which exhibits a flat, circular face concentrically wrinkled, with a very large rounded mouth, the edge of which is deeply radially wrinkled, giving it a papillose aspect externally. The horizontal line joining the bases of the tentacles will pass below the central axis of the rostrum, which is also distinctly constricted behind the tentacles. The surface of the rostrum is smooth, its dorsal line arched. The tentacles are short, stout, transversely wrinkled, and distinctly larger distally. There is a slight enlargement near their bases, where a small, black pigmented eyespot is clearly visible on both. There is no trace of an operculum or opercular lobe, nor any epipodial processes. Raising the mantle, which has a slightly thickened, smooth edge, we find, rather far back, the verge, which consists of a rather stout, recurved basal portion, above which it is constricted, the remainder being more slender, subcylindrical, slightly enlarged distally, but beyond this tapering to a point.

The organ is smaller in proportion to the size of the animal than in most Pleurotomidae. Above, on the dome of the mantle, is attached the rectum, with an evenly tapered adherent termination and a longitudinally wrinkled subcylindrical lumen. To the left of this the muciparous gland and kidney cover a broad strip of the mantle. Farther to the left we find a ctenidium composed of a single series of leaflets of the ordinary type, succeeded on the left by a well-developed Sprengel's organ, as usual, of a dark-olive color. The siphon, which is closely adjacent, is of very substantial tissue, with an external tinge of olive brown. It presents nothing unusual.

Internally the anatomy offers several points of interest. Within the oral orifice is an immense " crop " or pharynx (22 mm. long in the specimen examined), which, from the deep longitudinal wrinkles of its surface, is evidently capable of being greatly distended. It has a smooth, rather tough, lining without any horny appendages, and is lubricated by the discharge of several muciparous glands of rather small size. Its inner end is abrupt, and at the left of the middle line is the opening of the oesophagus, very much smaller than the pharynx in diameter. The proboscis proper is very short (in spirits), only about one-sixth as long as the pharynx, and therefore, unless capable of great extension in the living state, probably can not be extruded from the oral opening. The pharynx of the specimen examined was partly filled with a dark-greenish matter, apparently of a mucous character, which showed no traces of organization, leading to the supposition that the pharynx was adapted to the engorgement of large masses of protoplasmic matter rather than the pursuit of living animals of a higher order, as in most Toxoglossa. The modification is analogous to that by which Turcicula, a derivative from a phytophagous stock, has become adapted to gorging itself with large quantities of foraminifera, algae being absent from its habitat. The tooth sac opens near the end of the proboscis, but being filled with coagulated mucus, and extremely reduced in size by degeneration, could not be discovered until the mass was boiled in caustic potash in the hope of finding some traces of teeth. The teeth are set regularly in a single row on each side of an epithelial strip of rather horny (not chitinous) consistency, the points of the teeth inclined obliquely inward and overlapping a little. The width of the radula from base to base of the opposite teeth is 1/125 of an inch. The length of the developed radula is about 1/20 of an inch. There are forty or more developed teeth in each row, besides ten or twelve undeveloped germs of teeth. The fully developed teeth are 1/200 of an inch in length and about one-fourth as wide as long. This, for a creature over 4 inches long when extended, seems very minute. The form of the teeth is much like that of Bela; they are sharply pointed, translucent, and composed of a plate like the die for a steel pen folded closely upon itself with a U-shaped section. The shaft is set in a chitinous yellow socket, which is extended on the back of the tooth so as to form a little hooked knob. Opposite this many of the teeth show a small sharp basal denticle. The anterior arm of the U is shorter than the other and obliquely trimmed off toward the apex of the fang. There is a well-marked oval poison gland, about 2.5 mm. long, with a slender duct folded twice upon itself, very tortuous, and about 15 mm. long. Behind the proboscis the alimentary canal continues with moderate size for nearly a whorl, when there is an inconspicuous enlargement corresponding to a stomach, with its inner walls longitudinally wrinkled and no marked pyloric curve. It contained merely mucus, and resembled a slight enlargement of the esophagus rather than a well-differentiated stomach. The upper portion of the animal could not be extracted from the spire in spite of all efforts, and so great an advantage in this respect is given by the deep insertion of the columellar muscle, I was unable to withdraw any part of the animal in good condition until after cutting into the penultimate whorl with a file and severing the muscle with a fine scalpel.

This is a very interesting form, evidently related to some of Verrill's Fleurotomellae, but differing in important respects as may be seen by the generic diagnosis. It should be remembered that Verrill's type is P. pacMrdi, which differs considerably from most of the species afterwards referred to the group. An examination of specimens of Pleurotomella agassizii, Verrill, showed that the oral opening in that species did not markedly differ from other species of Pleurotomidae and the tentacles were eyeless and cylindrical. The specimen being a female, the forms of the verge, which often offer good characters, could not be compared, but Verrill describes it in P. packardi as "very large and long, round, nearly cylindrical, except near the tip, where it tapers; in alcoholic specimens it is nearly as thick as the neck, from which it arises." It will be observed that this description does not accord closely with the characters in Spergo.

== Distribution ==
This marine species occurs off Oahu Island,, Hawaii at a depth of 616 m.
