= Typhlosyrinx panamica =

Scientific classification
- Kingdom: Animalia
- Phylum: Mollusca
- Class: Gastropoda
- Subclass: Caenogastropoda
- Order: Neogastropoda
- Superfamily: Conoidea
- Family: Raphitomidae
- Genus: Typhlosyrinx
- Species: T. panamica

Binomial name
- Typhlosyrinx panamica Bouchet & Sysoev, 2001

Species of gastropod

Typhlosyrinx panamica is a species of sea snail, a marine gastropod mollusk in the family Raphitomidae.

== Description ==
The length of the shell attains 29.1 mm.

== Distribution ==
This marine species occurs in the Gulf of Panama.
