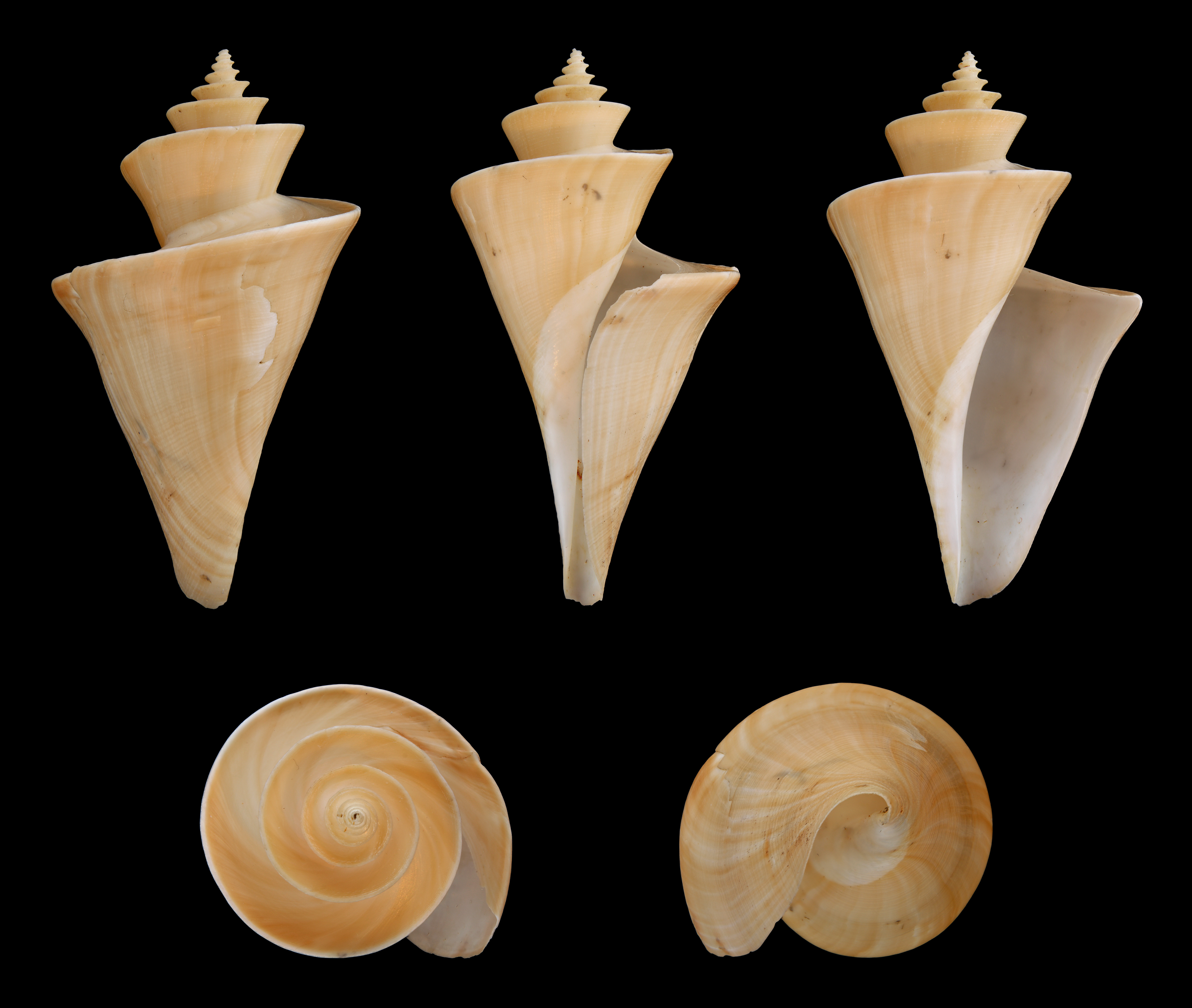
- Shell of Thatcheria mirabilis

Scientific classification
- Kingdom: Animalia
- Phylum: Mollusca
- Class: Gastropoda
- Subclass: Caenogastropoda
- Order: Neogastropoda
- Superfamily: Conoidea
- Family: Raphitomidae
- Genus: Thatcheria
- Species: T. mirabilis

Binomial name
- Thatcheria mirabilis Angas, 1877

= Thatcheria mirabilis =

Species of gastropod

Thatcheria mirabilis, common name the Japanese wonder shell or Miraculous thatcheria is a species of sea snail, a marine gastropod mollusk in the family Raphitomidae.

== Description ==
The length of the shell varies between 70 mm and 120 mm.

(Original description) The solid shell is angularly pyriform and yellowish white. The spire is elevated and acuminate towards the apex. It contains 8 whorls, flattened, and slightly excavated above, strongly and prominently keeled at the periphery, and sloping inwards below. Above the keels they are finely arcuately striate, below irregularly more or less crenately concentrically ridged. The aperture is triangularly subquadrate, pure white, and shining within. The white columella is smooth, slightly arcuate above, nearly straight below. The outer lip shows a broad excavated sinus extending from its juncture with the body whorl to the extremity of the last keel. Below the keel, which is very prominent, the lip is simple and arcuate.

== Distribution ==
This deepwater marine species occurs in the Indo-West Pacific, also off Japan, Philippines, and Western Australia; and as fossils, range: Upper Miocene to Recent (mainly Pliocene).
