= Abyssobela atoxica =

Scientific classification
- Kingdom: Animalia
- Phylum: Mollusca
- Class: Gastropoda
- Subclass: Caenogastropoda
- Order: Neogastropoda
- Superfamily: Conoidea
- Family: Raphitomidae
- Genus: Abyssobela
- Species: A. atoxica

Binomial name
- Abyssobela atoxica Kantor & Sysoev, 1986

Species of gastropod

Abyssobela atoxica is a species of sea snail, a marine gastropod mollusk in the family Raphitomidae.

== Distribution ==
This is a deep-sea species, occurring in the Izu–Ogasawara Trench, Japan.
