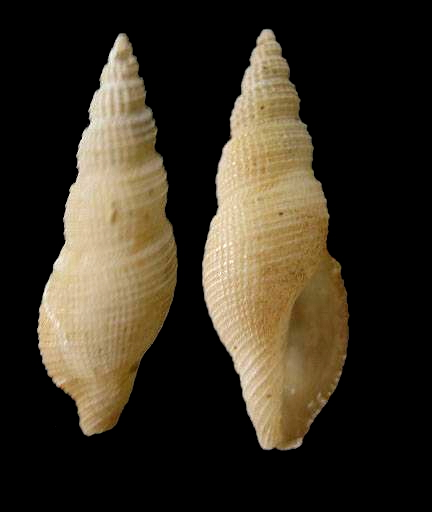
- Shell of Kuroshiodaphne saturata

Scientific classification
- Kingdom: Animalia
- Phylum: Mollusca
- Class: Gastropoda
- Subclass: Caenogastropoda
- Order: Neogastropoda
- Superfamily: Conoidea
- Family: Raphitomidae
- Genus: Kuroshiodaphne
- Species: K. saturata

Binomial name
- Kuroshiodaphne saturata (Reeve, 1845)

Synonyms
- Daphnella saturata (Reeve, 1845); Pleurotoma saturata Reeve, 1845

= Kuroshiodaphne saturata =

Species of gastropod

Kuroshiodaphne saturata is a species of sea snail, a marine gastropod mollusc in the family Raphitomidae.

== Description ==
The length of the shell varies between 9 mm and 28 mm.

A finely sculptured shell, conspicuous for a white somewhat raised band at the periphery of the body whorl, and adorned with other minor spiral bands. The coloration is a deepish brown. The outer lip is crenulate. The siphonal canal is slightly recurved.

== Distribution ==
This marine species occurs off the Philippines and Japan
