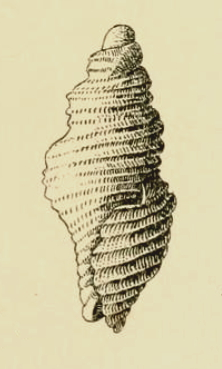
- Original image of a shell of Microgenia edwini

Scientific classification
- Kingdom: Animalia
- Phylum: Mollusca
- Class: Gastropoda
- Subclass: Caenogastropoda
- Order: Neogastropoda
- Superfamily: Conoidea
- Family: Raphitomidae
- Genus: Microgenia
- Species: M. edwini

Binomial name
- Microgenia edwini (Brazier in Henn, 1894)

Synonyms
- Nepotilla edwini (Brazier, 1894); Pleurotoma (Clathurella) edwini Brazier in Henn, 1894 (original description); Taranis edwini May, 1908

= Microgenia edwini =

Species of gastropod

Microgenia edwini is a species of sea snail, a marine gastropod mollusk in the family Raphitomidae.

== Description ==
The shell reaches a length of 4 mm and a diameter of 1¼ mm.

(Original description): The small, solid shell is fusiformly turreted. It is reddish-brown and white spotted. The shell contains 5 whorls, the apical one white, smooth and mammillated, the second finely punctated like a thimble, third and fourth spirally and sharply carinated with two keels, a much finer one below. The body whorl is sharply keeled at the angle having eight spiral lines below, between the suture and the spiral keels very finely longitudinally striated. The aperture is small, ovate, brownish within. The columella is whitish, nearly straight. The outer lip is finely denticulated at the edge, contracted below. The posterior sinus is wide and deep.

== Distribution ==
This marine species is endemic to Australia and occurs off New South Wales and Tasmania
