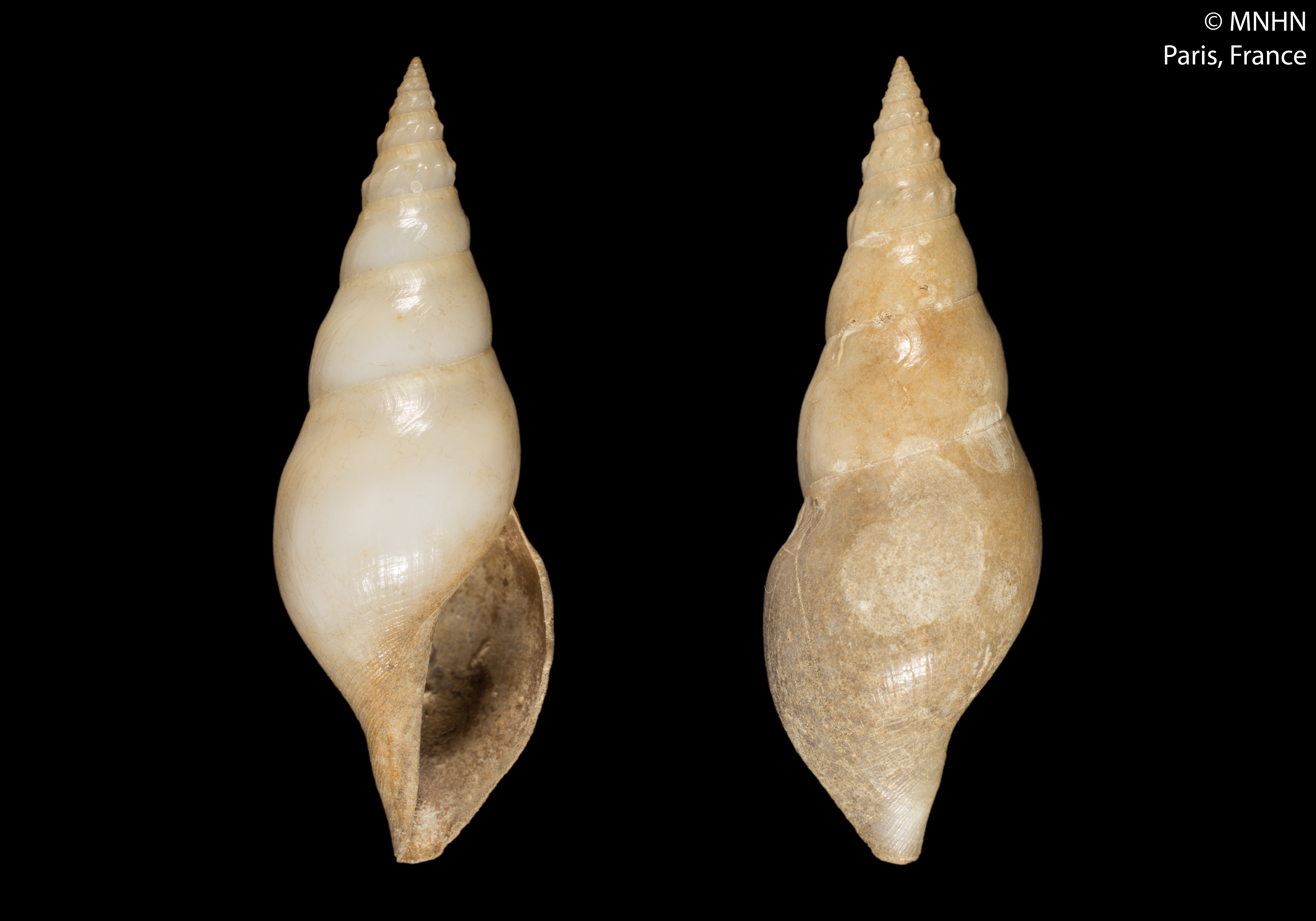
- Shell of Typhlosyrinx neocaledoniensis (holotype at MNHN, Paris)

Scientific classification
- Kingdom: Animalia
- Phylum: Mollusca
- Class: Gastropoda
- Subclass: Caenogastropoda
- Order: Neogastropoda
- Superfamily: Conoidea
- Family: Raphitomidae
- Genus: Typhlosyrinx
- Species: T. neocaledoniensis

Binomial name
- Typhlosyrinx neocaledoniensis Bouchet & Sysoev, 2001

= Typhlosyrinx neocaledoniensis =

Species of gastropod

Typhlosyrinx neocaledoniensis is a species of sea snail, a marine gastropod mollusk in the family Raphitomidae.

== Description ==
The length of the shell attains 36.9 mm.

== Distribution ==
This marine species occurs off New Caledonia.
