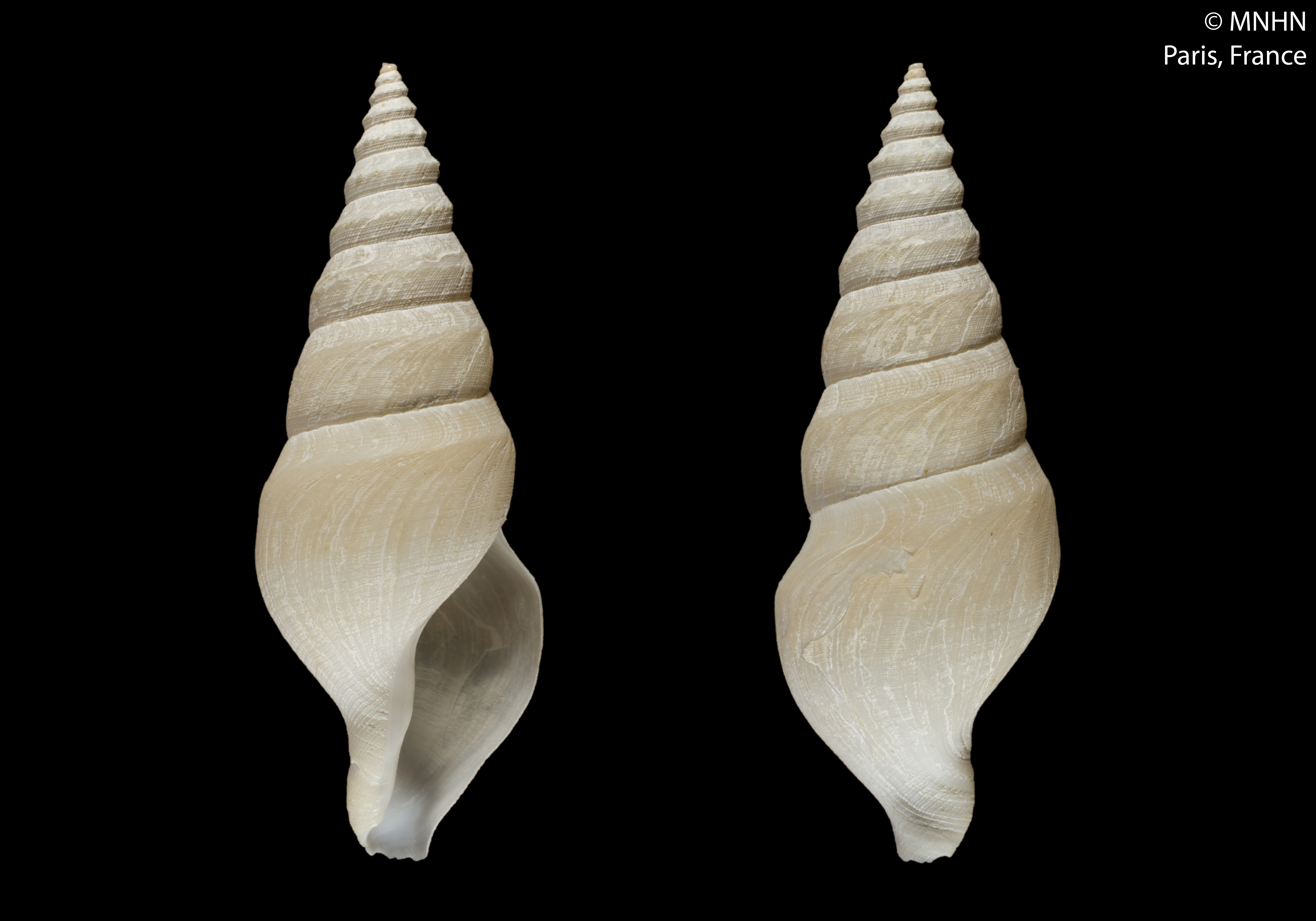
- Shell of Pagodibela baruna (holotype at MNHN, Paris)

Scientific classification
- Kingdom: Animalia
- Phylum: Mollusca
- Class: Gastropoda
- Subclass: Caenogastropoda
- Order: Neogastropoda
- Superfamily: Conoidea
- Family: Raphitomidae
- Genus: Pagodibela
- Species: P. baruna

Binomial name
- Pagodibela baruna Sysoev, 1997

Synonyms
- Gymnobela baruna Sysoev, 1997 (original combination)

= Pagodibela baruna =

Species of gastropod

Pagodibela baruna is a species of sea snail, a marine gastropod mollusk in the family Raphitomidae.

== Description ==
The length of the shell attains 36.2 mm, its diameter is 12.8 mm.

== Distribution ==
This marine species occurs at East Indonesia off the Kai Islands.
