= Microdaphne indohystrix =

Scientific classification
- Kingdom: Animalia
- Phylum: Mollusca
- Class: Gastropoda
- Subclass: Caenogastropoda
- Order: Neogastropoda
- Superfamily: Conoidea
- Family: Raphitomidae
- Genus: Microdaphne
- Species: †M. indohystrix

Binomial name
- †Microdaphne indohystrix Harzhauser, 2014

Extinct species of gastropod

Microdaphne indohystrix is an extinct species of sea snail, a marine gastropod mollusk in the family Raphitomidae.

== Description ==
The length of the shell attains 1.8 mm, its diameter is 0.8 mm.

== Distribution ==
Fossils of this species were found in Early Miocene strata of the Burdigalian in the Warkalli Formation, Kerala State, India.
