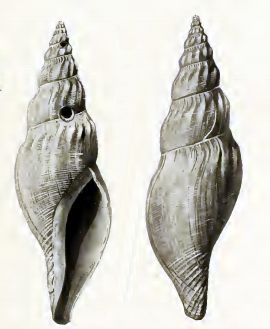
- Original image of a shell of Spergo sibogae

Scientific classification
- Kingdom: Animalia
- Phylum: Mollusca
- Class: Gastropoda
- Subclass: Caenogastropoda
- Order: Neogastropoda
- Superfamily: Conoidea
- Family: Raphitomidae
- Genus: Spergo
- Species: S. sibogae

Binomial name
- Spergo sibogae (Schepman, 1913)

Synonyms
- Gymnobela sibogae (Schepman, 1913)

= Spergo sibogae =

Species of gastropod

Spergo sibogae is a species of sea snail, a marine gastropod mollusk in the family Raphitomidae.

== Description ==
The length of the shell attains 54 mm, its diameter 18 mm.

(Original description) The rather strong, fusiform shell is yellowish-brown. The protoconch is wanting. The 9 remaining whorls are moderately convex, slightly excavated below the conspicuous but shallow suture. The sculpture consists of remote, oblique, axial ribs, conspicuous in the upper whorls, fainter lower on, disappearing on the back of the body whorl. They form tubercles below the excavation, which in the upper whorls bear short plicae, just below the suture. The lower part of the whorls is crossed by very numerous spiral striae, conspicuous in upper whorls, faint on the last one, but stronger towards and on the siphonal canal. The aperture is elongately-oval, angular above, with a wide siphonal canal below. The peristome is damaged according to the fine growth-lines, with a very shallow sinus above, then regularly arched. The columellar margin is concave above, then nearly straight, at last slightly directed to the left, covered with a layer of enamel, which is thin above, stronger below. The interior of the aperture is smooth.

== Distribution ==
This marine species occurs in the Banda Sea, Indonesia.
