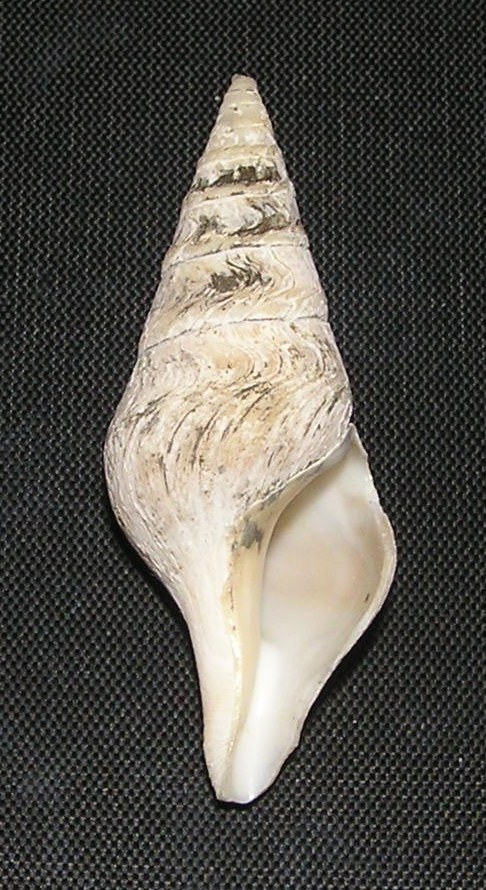
- Shell of Typhlosyrinx supracostata

Scientific classification
- Kingdom: Animalia
- Phylum: Mollusca
- Class: Gastropoda
- Subclass: Caenogastropoda
- Order: Neogastropoda
- Superfamily: Conoidea
- Family: Raphitomidae
- Genus: Typhlosyrinx
- Species: T. supracostata

Binomial name
- Typhlosyrinx supracostata (Schepman, 1913)

Synonyms
- Surcula supracostata Schepman, 1913 (original combination)

= Typhlosyrinx supracostata =

Species of gastropod

Typhlosyrinx supracostata is a species of sea snail, a marine gastropod mollusk in the family Raphitomidae.

This is not Typhlosyrinx supracostata Matsukuma et al., 1991 (synonym of Leiosyrinx supracostata)

== Description ==
The length of the shell varies between 20 mm and 35 mm.

(Original description) The thin, fusiform shell has a short siphonal canal. It is shining and is light yellowish-white. The protoconch is wanting. The 8 remaining whorls are nearly regularly convex, very slightly excavated below the conspicuous but shallow suture in the lower whorls, more so in upper ones. The sculpture consists in the upper whorls of thick axial ribs, disappearing on the sixth whorl, which is 9-ribbed. The lower whorls are nearly smooth, but are sculptured under the lens by fine, strongly waved growth lines, more conspicuous at irregular intervals. The whole shell is crossed by very faint spirals, scarcely visible on the upper part of whorls, stronger on the lower part, having the appearance of crowded lirae on the siphonal canal. The body whorl is regularly attenuated below, ending in a short, wide siphonal canal. Aperture is elongately oval, angular above. The peristome shows a wide but shallow sinus at the suture, the strongly protracted. The columellar margin is nearly straight, covered by a thin layer of enamel.

== Distribution ==
This marine species occurs off Indonesia, the Salomon Islands, Papua New Guinea, Vanuatu and Japan.
