= Kuroshiodaphne subula =

- Shell of Kuroshiodaphne subula

Scientific classification
- Kingdom: Animalia
- Phylum: Mollusca
- Class: Gastropoda
- Subclass: Caenogastropoda
- Order: Neogastropoda
- Superfamily: Conoidea
- Family: Raphitomidae
- Genus: Kuroshiodaphne
- Species: K. subula

Binomial name
- Kuroshiodaphne subula (Reeve, 1845)

Synonyms
- Mangilia subula (Reeve, 1845); Pleurotoma subula Reeve, 1845

Species of gastropod

Kuroshiodaphne subula is a species of sea snail, a marine gastropod mollusc in the family Raphitomidae.

== Description ==
The length of the shell attains 15 mm.

The shell is closely reticulated with longitudinal and revolving lines, with a flatly obtuse keel near the suture. The lip-sinus is distinct. The shell is yellowish white, painted with chestnut spots around the suture.

== Distribution ==
This marine species occurs off the Philippines and Taiwan
