= Thatcheria waitaraensis =

Scientific classification
- Kingdom: Animalia
- Phylum: Mollusca
- Class: Gastropoda
- Subclass: Caenogastropoda
- Order: Neogastropoda
- Superfamily: Conoidea
- Family: Raphitomidae
- Genus: Thatcheria
- Species: T. waitaraensis

Binomial name
- Thatcheria waitaraensis (Marwick, 1926)

Synonyms
- † Turricula waitaraensis Marwick, 1926; † Waitara waitaraensis (Marwick, 1926)

Extinct species of gastropod

Thatcheria waitaraensis is an extinct species of sea snail, a marine gastropod mollusk in the family Raphitomidae.

== Distribution ==
Fossils of this marine species were found in Upper Miocene strata in New Zealand.
