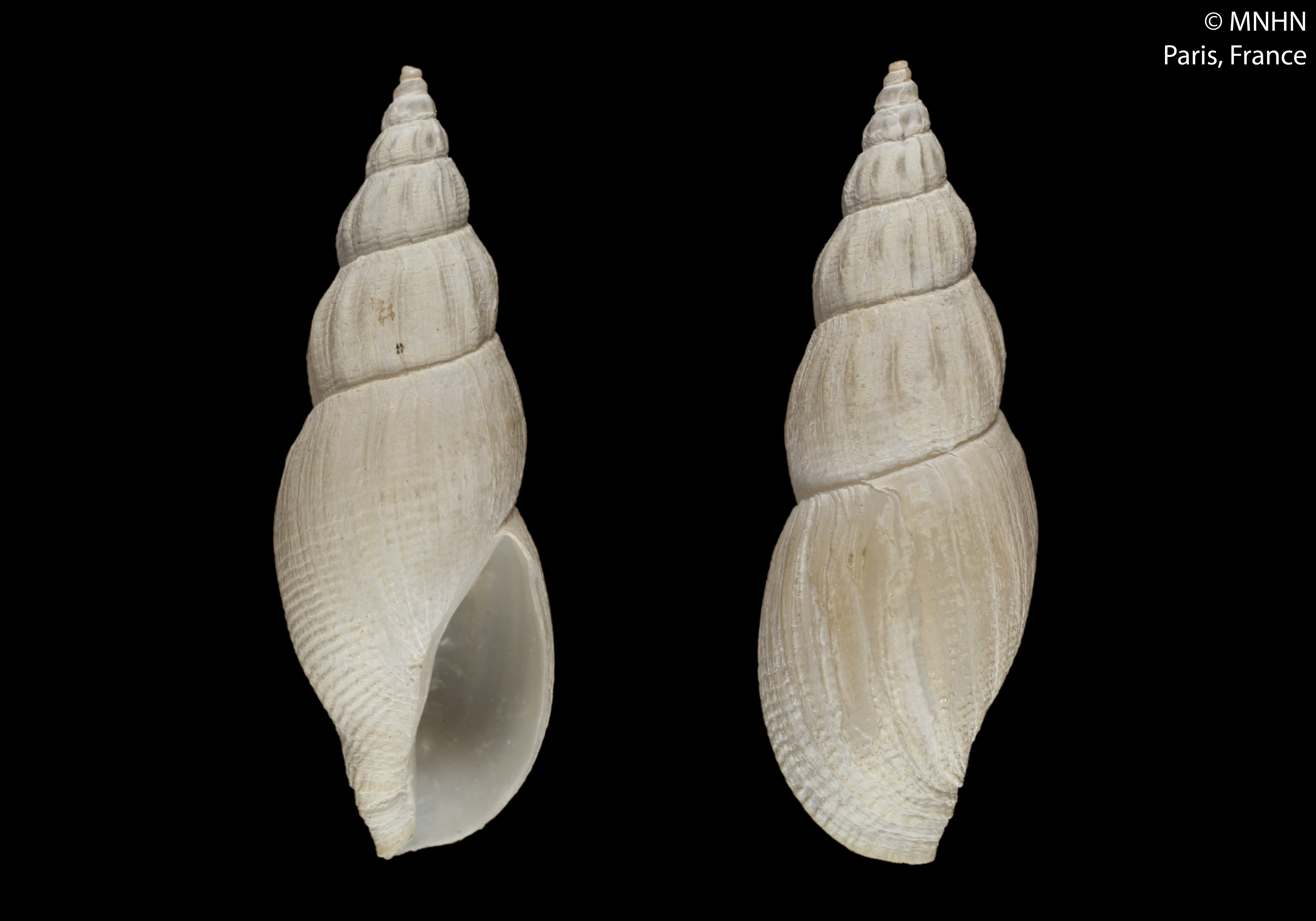
- Shell of Rocroithys perissus (holotype at MNHN, Paris)

Scientific classification
- Kingdom: Animalia
- Phylum: Mollusca
- Class: Gastropoda
- Subclass: Caenogastropoda
- Order: Neogastropoda
- Superfamily: Conoidea
- Family: Raphitomidae
- Genus: Rocroithys
- Species: R. perissus

Binomial name
- Rocroithys perissus Sysoev & Bouchet, 2001

= Rocroithys perissus =

Species of gastropod

Rocroithys perissus is a species of sea snail, a marine gastropod mollusk in the family Raphitomidae.

== Description ==
The length of the shell attains 22.4 mm.

== Distribution ==
This marine species occurs off New Caledonia.
