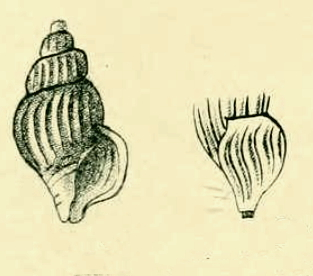
- Original image of a shell of Stilla flexicostata

Scientific classification
- Kingdom: Animalia
- Phylum: Mollusca
- Class: Gastropoda
- Subclass: Caenogastropoda
- Order: Neogastropoda
- Superfamily: Conoidea
- Family: Raphitomidae
- Genus: Stilla
- Species: S. flexicostata

Binomial name
- Stilla flexicostata (Suter, 1899)

Synonyms
- Mangilia flexicostata Suter, 1899

= Stilla flexicostata =

Species of gastropod

Stilla flexicostata is a species of sea snail, a marine gastropod mollusk in the family Raphitomidae.

== Description ==
The length of the shell attains 2.25 mm, its diameter 1.25 mm.

(Original description) The minute, white, semi-transparent shell has an oval-elongated shape. Its spire is longer than the body whorl. It contains five whorls, narrowly shouldered, with flexuous plicae, about 16 on the body whorl, microscopically spirally striate. The protoconch consists of 1½ smooth, minute whorls. The suture is deep. The aperture is oval and angled above. The outer lip is somewhat thickened, sinuous, with a broad shallow sinus just below the suture. The columella is arcuate, slightly callous. The anterior siphonal canal is short, rather oblique and truncated. The animal is unknown.

== Distribution ==
This marine species is endemic to New Zealand and occurs off Foveaux Strait, Stewart, Snares and Auckland Island
