= Thatcherina diazi =

Scientific classification
- Kingdom: Animalia
- Phylum: Mollusca
- Class: Gastropoda
- Subclass: Caenogastropoda
- Order: Neogastropoda
- Family: Raphitomidae
- Genus: Thatcherina
- Species: T. diazi

Binomial name
- Thatcherina diazi Gracia & Vera-Peláez, 2004

Species of gastropod

Thatcherina diazi is a species of sea snail, a marine gastropod mollusk in the family Raphitomidae.
