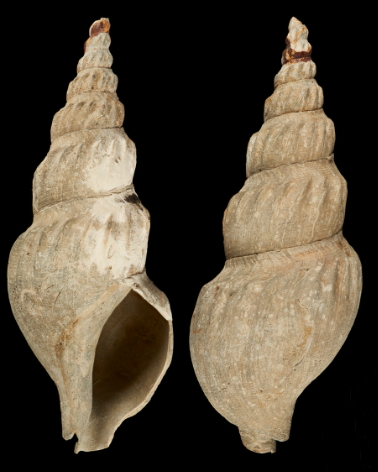
- Shell of Spergo chuni (holotype in the Museum für Naturkunde)

Scientific classification
- Kingdom: Animalia
- Phylum: Mollusca
- Class: Gastropoda
- Subclass: Caenogastropoda
- Order: Neogastropoda
- Superfamily: Conoidea
- Family: Raphitomidae
- Genus: Spergo
- Species: S. chuni

Binomial name
- Spergo chuni (von Martens, 1902)

Synonyms
- Comitas chuni (E. von Martens, 1901); Pleurotoma (Pseudotoma) chuni E. von Martens, 1901 superseded combination; Pleurotoma chuni Martens, 1901 (original combination)

= Spergo chuni =

Species of gastropod

Spergo chuni is a species of sea snail, a marine gastropod mollusk in the family Raphitomidae.

== Description ==
The shell measures 93 mm in length and 35 mm in diameter; the aperture, including the siphonal canal, measures 39 mm, and excluding the canal, 32 mm.

(Original description in Latin) The obese shell is turreted, rather solid, and imperforate. It is obliquely plicate and gray in color. It has more than eight whorls, which are closely and lightly spirally grooved above, with the upper part concave and the suture ragged. Farther down, the whorls are sculptured with arcuate growth striae, then become somewhat angled and are marked by prominent oblique folds that run downward and reach the lower suture. The whorls are then somewhat attenuated below.

The aperture is ovate-oblong and occupies one-third of the total shell length. The outer lip is slightly arched, the columellar lip is smooth and somewhat calloused, and the siphonal canal is short and open.

== Distribution ==
This marine species occurs off Sumatra, Indonesia, and off Western Australia.
