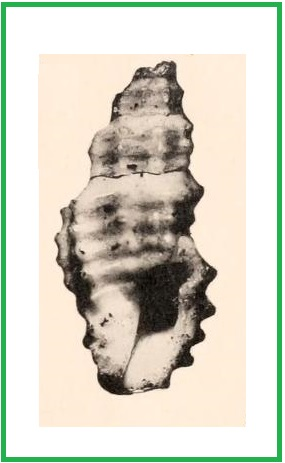

Scientific classification
- Kingdom: Animalia
- Phylum: Mollusca
- Class: Gastropoda
- Subclass: Caenogastropoda
- Order: Neogastropoda
- Superfamily: Conoidea
- Family: Raphitomidae
- Genus: Truncadaphne
- Species: T. stonei

Binomial name
- Truncadaphne stonei (Hertlein & A. M. Strong, 1939)

Synonyms
- Philbertia stonei Hertlein & A. M. Strong, 1939 (original combination)

= Truncadaphne stonei =

Species of gastropod

Truncadaphne stonei is a species of sea snail, a marine gastropod mollusk in the family Raphitomidae.

== Description ==
The length of the shell attains 4 mm, its diameter is 1.8 mm.

- image

== Distribution ==
This marine species occurred in the Pleistocene off the Galapagos Islands in shallow water.
