= Maoridaphne =

Scientific classification
- Kingdom: Animalia
- Phylum: Mollusca
- Class: Gastropoda
- Subclass: Caenogastropoda
- Order: Neogastropoda
- Superfamily: Conoidea
- Family: Raphitomidae
- Genus: †Maoridaphne; Powell, 1942

Type species
- † Daphnella clifdenica Laws, 1939

Species
- See text

Extinct genus of gastropods

Maoridaphne is an extinct genus of sea snails, marine gastropod mollusks in the family Raphitomidae.

== Species ==
Species within the genus Maoridaphne include:

- † Maoridaphne clifdenica (Laws, 1939)
- † Maoridaphne haroldi Powell, 1942
- † Maoridaphne kaiparica (Laws, 1939)

Species brought into synonymy:

- Maoridaphne supracancellata (Schepman, 1913): synonym of Kuroshiodaphne supracancellata (Schepman, 1913)
