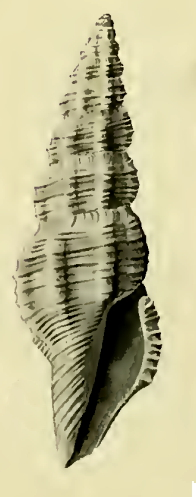
- Original image of a shell of Vepridaphne cestrum

Scientific classification
- Kingdom: Animalia
- Phylum: Mollusca
- Class: Gastropoda
- Subclass: Caenogastropoda
- Order: Neogastropoda
- Superfamily: Conoidea
- Family: Raphitomidae
- Genus: Vepridaphne
- Species: V. cestrum

Binomial name
- Vepridaphne cestrum (Hedley, 1922)

Synonyms
- Clathurella debilis Brazier, 1876; Clavatula debilis Hinds, 1844; Daphnella cestrum Hedley, 1922

= Vepridaphne cestrum =

Species of gastropod

Vepridaphne cestrum is a species of sea snail, a marine gastropod mollusk in the family Raphitomidae.

== Description ==
The length of the shell attains 10 mm, its diameter 3 mm.

(Original description) The acicular shell is thin, but boldly sculptured, contracted at the suture, excavate at the base. The siphonal canal is produced and recurved. The colour of the shell is pale yellow, with two rufous brown zones, one above, the other below the periphery, both interrupted by the ribs. The columella is lilac. The apex is salmon buff. The shell contains eleven whorls, including three on the protoconch. The suture is impressed and undulating. The base of the shell is defined by a sharp angle which continues the horizon of the suture.

Sculpture:—The fasciole area is without spirals, but is crossed by radial crescentic wrinkles. The spirals may amount to twenty-seven on the body whorl, those on the periphery being alternately larger and smaller. Seven of these ascend the penultimate whorl. All of these override the radials. The radials are thin, high, variciform riblets, perpendicular, discontinuous, extending from below the fasciole to the angle of the base, and set at eight to a whorl.

Aperture: The outer lip is simple. The sinus is adjacent to the suture, deeper than broad and is rounded. The inner lip shows a thin callus. The siphonal canal is open, produced, and recurved.

== Distribution ==
This marine species is endemic to Australia and occurs in the Gulf of Carpentaria and off Queensland.,
