= Fusobela cancellata =

Scientific classification
- Kingdom: Animalia
- Phylum: Mollusca
- Class: Gastropoda
- Subclass: Caenogastropoda
- Order: Neogastropoda
- Superfamily: Conoidea
- Family: Raphitomidae
- Genus: Fusobela
- Species: F. cancellata

Binomial name
- Fusobela cancellata (Sysoev, 1988)

Synonyms
- Pleurotomella cancellata Sysoev, 1988 superseded combination

Species of gastropod

Fusobela cancellata is a species of sea snail, a marine gastropod mollusk in the family Raphitomidae.

== Distribution ==
This species was found in the Kurile-Kamchatka Trench, Northern Pacific. off the Ogasawara Islands.
