= Typhlosyrinx vepallida =

Scientific classification
- Kingdom: Animalia
- Phylum: Mollusca
- Class: Gastropoda
- Subclass: Caenogastropoda
- Order: Neogastropoda
- Superfamily: Conoidea
- Family: Raphitomidae
- Genus: Typhlosyrinx
- Species: T. vepallida

Binomial name
- Typhlosyrinx vepallida (Martens, 1902)

Synonyms
- Leucosyrinx vepallida Martens, 1904; Pleurotoma (Leucosyrinx) vepallida Martens, 1902 (original combination); Pleurotoma (Surcula) vepallida E. A. Smith, 1906; Pleurotomella (Typhlosyrinx) vepallida Thiele, 1925

Species of gastropod

Typhlosyrinx vepallida is a species of sea snail, a marine gastropod mollusk in the family Raphitomidae.

== Description ==
The length of the holotype of the shell attains 43.1 mm, its diameter 16.4 mm.

== Distribution ==
This marine species occurs in the Gulf of Aden at a depth of 1840 m.
