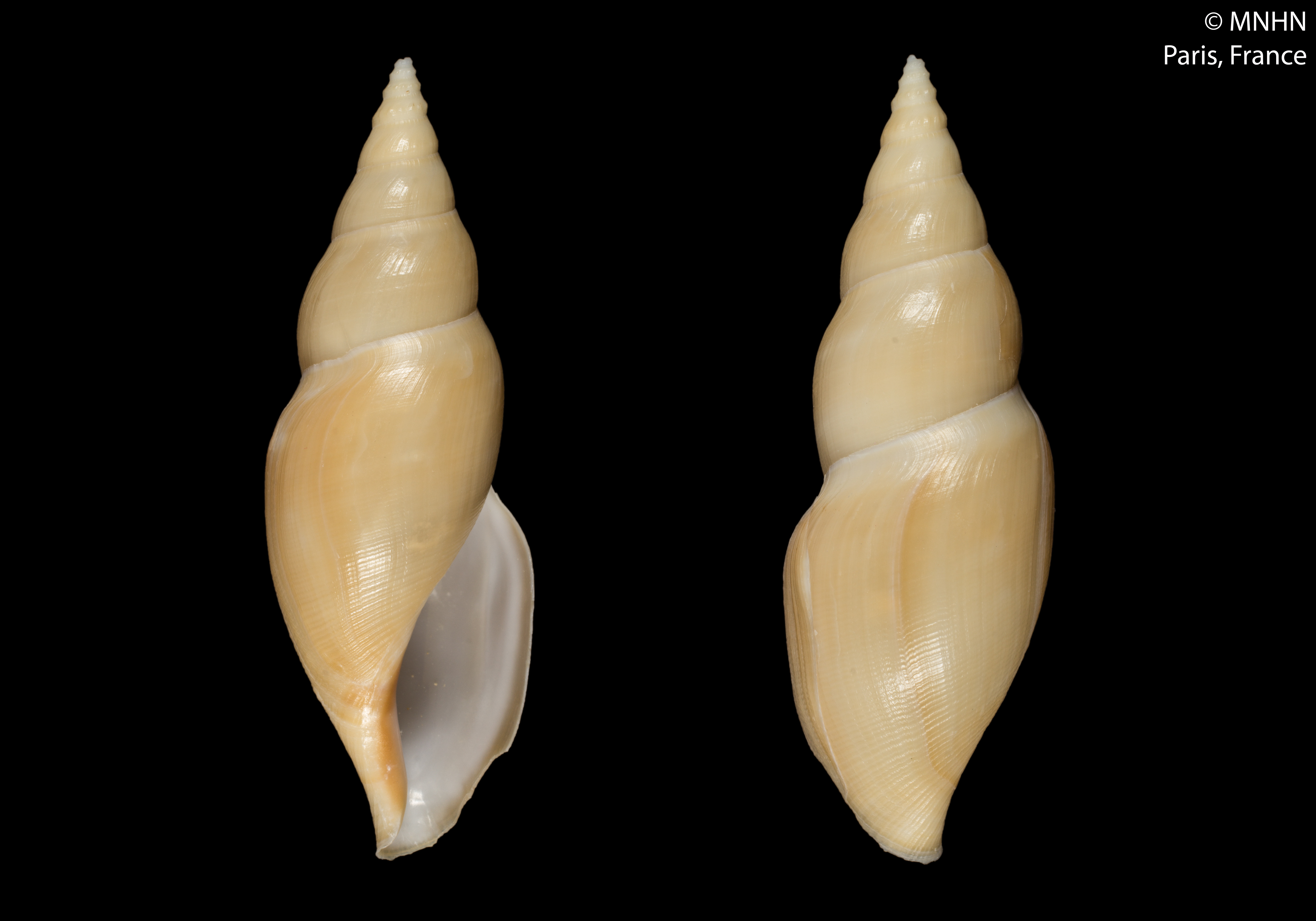
- Shell of Spergo aithorrhis (holotype at MNHN, Paris)

Scientific classification
- Kingdom: Animalia
- Phylum: Mollusca
- Class: Gastropoda
- Subclass: Caenogastropoda
- Order: Neogastropoda
- Superfamily: Conoidea
- Family: Raphitomidae
- Genus: Spergo
- Species: S. aithorrhis

Binomial name
- Spergo aithorrhis Sysoev & Bouchet, 2001

= Spergo aithorrhis =

Species of gastropod

Spergo aithorrhis is a species of sea snail, a marine gastropod mollusk in the family Raphitomidae.

== Description ==
The length of the shell reaches 120 mm.

== Distribution ==
This marine species occurs off the Philippines, the Norfolk Ridge and New Caledonia.
