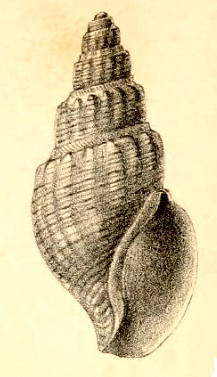
- Original image of a shell of Pontiothauma abyssicola

Scientific classification
- Kingdom: Animalia
- Phylum: Mollusca
- Class: Gastropoda
- Subclass: Caenogastropoda
- Order: Neogastropoda
- Superfamily: Conoidea
- Family: Raphitomidae
- Genus: Pontiothauma; E. A. Smith, 1895

Type species
- Pontiothauma mirabile E. A. Smith, 1895

= Pontiothauma =

Genus of gastropods

Pontiothauma is a genus of sea snails, marine gastropod mollusks in the family Raphitomidae.

== Description ==
The fusiform shell is not umbilicate, anteriorly rostrate and obliquely folded, It is spirally furrowed by lirae. The aperture ends in a short siphonal canal. The simple columella is not folded. The outer lip is thin, posteriorly wide but not deeply sinuate. The shell lacks an operculum.

The enormously expanded rostrum, and the absence of eyes, radula, and operculum, at once separate this genus from any which it approaches in shell-character.

== Species ==
Species within the genus Pontiothauma include:

- Pontiothauma abyssicola Smith E. A., 1895
- Pontiothauma minus Smith E. A., 1906
- Pontiothauma mirabile Smith E. A., 1895
- Pontiothauma pacei Smith E. A., 1906

Species brought into synonymy

- Pontiothauma ergata Hedley, 1916: synonym of Belaturricula ergata (Hedley, 1916)
- Pontiothauma fusiforme Habe, 1962: synonym of Spergo fusiformis (Habe, 1962) (original combination)
- Pontiothauma hedleyi Dell, 1990: synonym of Aforia hedleyi (Dell, 1990)
- Pontiothauma viridis (Okutani, 1966): synonym of Belomitra viridis (Okutani, 1966)
