= Maoridaphne kaiparica =

Scientific classification
- Kingdom: Animalia
- Phylum: Mollusca
- Class: Gastropoda
- Subclass: Caenogastropoda
- Order: Neogastropoda
- Superfamily: Conoidea
- Family: Raphitomidae
- Genus: †Maoridaphne
- Species: †M. kaiparica

Binomial name
- †Maoridaphne kaiparica (Laws, 1939)

Synonyms
- † Daphnella kaiparica Laws, 1939 (original combination)

Extinct species of gastropod

Maoridaphne kaiparica is an extinct species of sea snail, a marine gastropod mollusk in the family Raphitomidae.

== Distribution ==
Fossils of this species were found in New Zealand.
