= Typhlosyrinx praecipua =

Scientific classification
- Kingdom: Animalia
- Phylum: Mollusca
- Class: Gastropoda
- Subclass: Caenogastropoda
- Order: Neogastropoda
- Superfamily: Conoidea
- Family: Raphitomidae
- Genus: Typhlosyrinx
- Species: T. praecipua

Binomial name
- Typhlosyrinx praecipua (E. A. Smith, 1899)

Synonyms
- Pleurotoma (Surcula) praecipua E. A. Smith, 1899 (original combination)

Species of gastropod

Typhlosyrinx praecipua is a species of sea snail, a marine gastropod mollusk in the family Raphitomidae.

== Description ==
The length of the shell attains 38 mm, its diameter 15 mm.

== Distribution ==
This marine species occurs off Travancore, India; Gulf of Aden.
