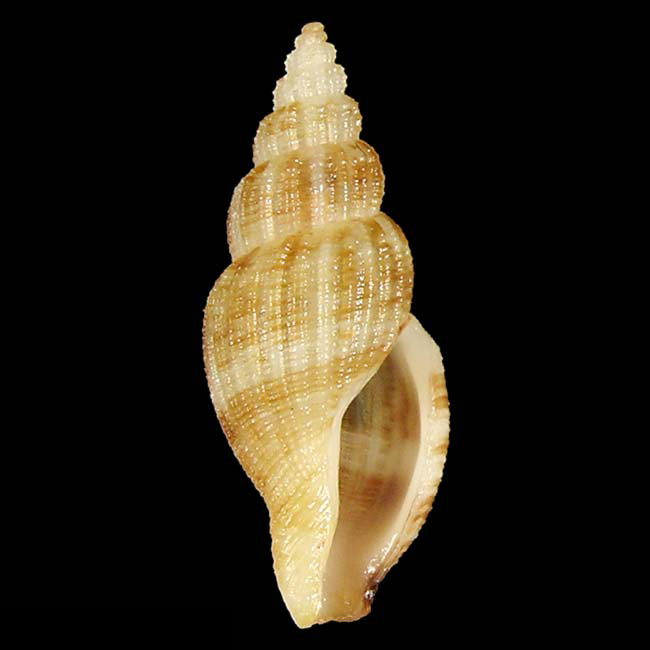
- Shell of Kuroshiodaphne aurea

Scientific classification
- Kingdom: Animalia
- Phylum: Mollusca
- Class: Gastropoda
- Subclass: Caenogastropoda
- Order: Neogastropoda
- Superfamily: Conoidea
- Family: Raphitomidae
- Genus: Kuroshiodaphne
- Species: K. aurea

Binomial name
- Kuroshiodaphne aurea Stahlschmidt, Poppe & Tagaro, 2018

Synonyms
- Kuroshiodaphne aureus Stahlschmidt, Poppe & Tagaro, 2018 (incorrect gender ending of specific epithet)

= Kuroshiodaphne aurea =

Species of gastropod

Kuroshiodaphne aurea is a species of sea snail, a marine gastropod mollusk in the family Raphitomidae.

== Description ==
The length of the shell varies between 11 mm and 14 mm.

== Distribution ==
This marine species occurs off Mactan Island, Cebu, the Philippines.
