= Aplotoma brevitentaculata =

Scientific classification
- Kingdom: Animalia
- Phylum: Mollusca
- Class: Gastropoda
- Subclass: Caenogastropoda
- Order: Neogastropoda
- Superfamily: Conoidea
- Family: Raphitomidae
- Genus: Aplotoma
- Species: A. brevitentaculata

Binomial name
- Aplotoma brevitentaculata Criscione, Hallan, Puillandre & Fedosov, 2020

Species of gastropod

Aplotoma brevitentaculata is a species of sea snail, a marine gastropod mollusk in the family Raphitomidae.

== Distribution ==
This marine species is endemic to Australia and occurs off Victoria.
