= Fusobela =

Scientific classification
- Kingdom: Animalia
- Phylum: Mollusca
- Class: Gastropoda
- Subclass: Caenogastropoda
- Order: Neogastropoda
- Superfamily: Conoidea
- Family: Raphitomidae
- Genus: Fusobela; Criscione, Hallan, Puillandre & Fedosov, 2020

Type species
- Fusobela parvioculata Criscione, Hallan, Puillandre & Fedosov, 2020

Genus of gastropods

Fusobela is a genus of sea snails, marine gastropod mollusks in the family Raphitomidae.

== Species ==
- Fusobela cancellata (Sysoev, 1988)
- Fusobela parvioculata Criscione, Hallan, Puillandre & Fedosov, 2020
