= Glyphostomoides =

Scientific classification
- Kingdom: Animalia
- Phylum: Mollusca
- Class: Gastropoda
- Subclass: Caenogastropoda
- Order: Neogastropoda
- Superfamily: Conoidea
- Family: Raphitomidae
- Genus: Glyphostomoides; Shuto, 1983

Type species
- Philbertia queenslandica Shuto, 1983

Species
- See text

Genus of gastropods

Glyphostomoides is a genus of sea snails, marine gastropod mollusks in the family Raphitomidae.

== Species ==
- Glyphostomoides queenslandica (Shuto, 1983)
