= Truncadaphne =

Scientific classification
- Kingdom: Animalia
- Phylum: Mollusca
- Class: Gastropoda
- Subclass: Caenogastropoda
- Order: Neogastropoda
- Superfamily: Conoidea
- Family: Raphitomidae
- Genus: Truncadaphne; McLean, 1971

Type species
- Philbertia stonei Hertlein & Strong, 1939

Species
- See text

Genus of gastropods

Truncadaphne is a genus of sea snails, marine gastropod mollusks in the family Raphitomidae.

== Species ==
Species within the genus Truncadaphne include:

- Truncadaphne stonei (Hertlein & Strong, 1939)

Species brought into synonymy

- Truncadaphne permiscere (Nowell-Usticke, 1969): synonym of Hemilienardia chrysoleuca (J.C. Melvill, 1923)
