= Tuskaroria =

Scientific classification
- Kingdom: Animalia
- Phylum: Mollusca
- Class: Gastropoda
- Subclass: Caenogastropoda
- Order: Neogastropoda
- Superfamily: Conoidea
- Family: Raphitomidae
- Genus: Tuskaroria; Sysoev, 1988

Type species
- Tuskaroria ultraabyssalis Sysoev, 1988 (type by original designation)

Species
- See text

Genus of gastropods

Tuskaroria is a genus of sea snails, marine gastropod mollusks in the family Raphitomidae.

== Species ==
Species within the genus Tuskaroria include:

- Tuskaroria ultraabyssalis Sysoev, 1988
