= Onoketoma =

Scientific classification
- Kingdom: Animalia
- Phylum: Mollusca
- Class: Gastropoda
- Subclass: Caenogastropoda
- Order: Neogastropoda
- Family: Raphitomidae
- Genus: †Onoketoma; Beu, 2011
- Species: †O. solitaria

Binomial name
- †Onoketoma solitaria (L. C. King, 1933)

Extinct genus of molluscs

Onoketoma is a genus of extinct gastropods in the family Raphitomidae, established in 2011.

== Description ==
The shell is similar to Raphitomidae shells.

== Distribution ==
This genus lived in benthic zones in New Zealand, appearing in the late Miocene era. Fossils have been found in the Onoke formation.

== Species ==
This genus has one species, Onoketoma solitaria.
