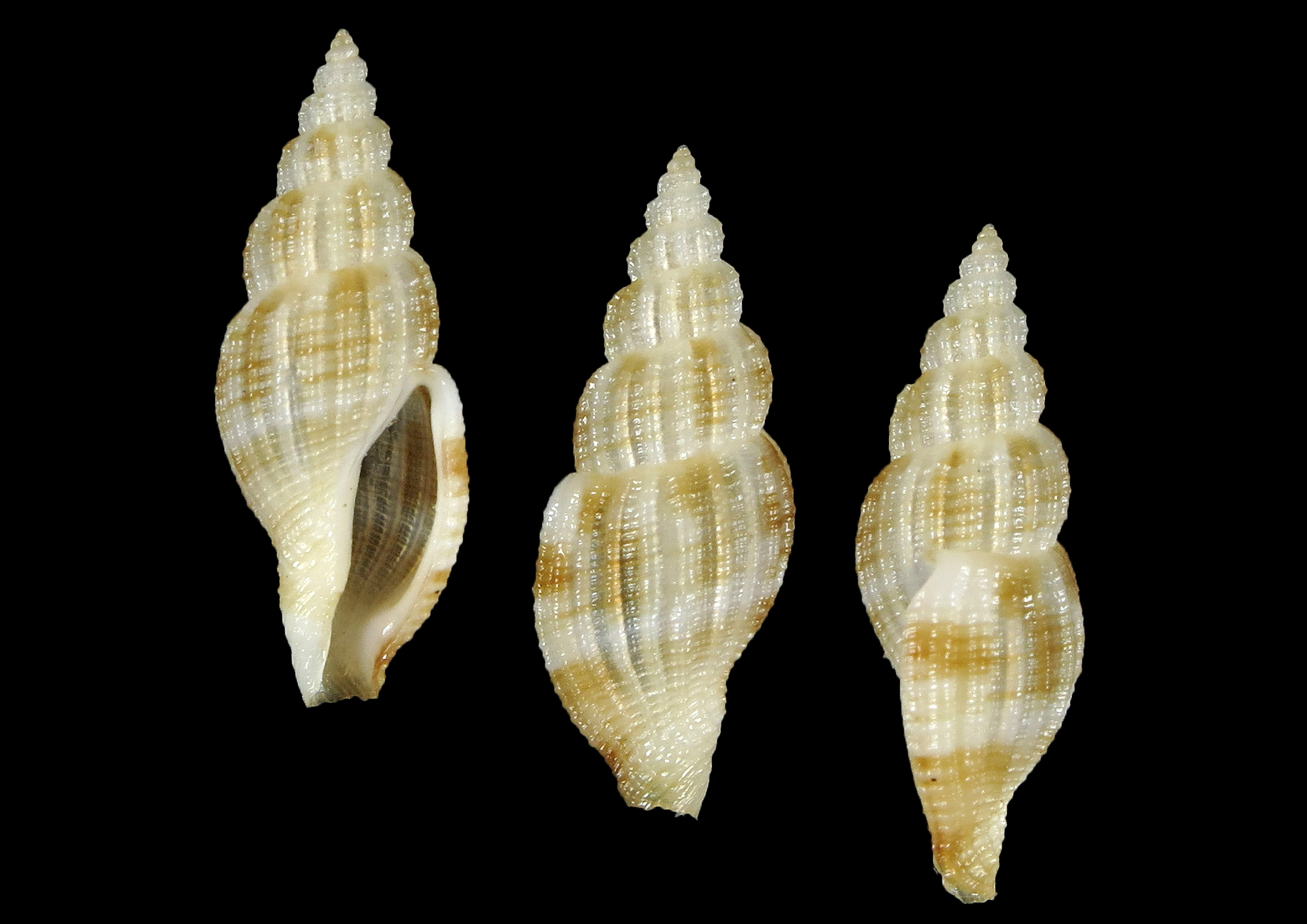
- Holotype of Kuroshiodaphne aurea at MNHN, Paris

Scientific classification
- Kingdom: Animalia
- Phylum: Mollusca
- Class: Gastropoda
- Subclass: Caenogastropoda
- Order: Neogastropoda
- Superfamily: Conoidea
- Family: Raphitomidae
- Genus: Kuroshiodaphne; Shuto, 1965

Type species
- Daphnella fuscobalteata E. A. Smith, 1879

Species
- See text

= Kuroshiodaphne =

Genus of gastropods

Kuroshiodaphne is a genus of sea snails, marine gastropod mollusks in the family Raphitomidae.

== Species ==
Species within the genus Kuroshiodaphne include:

- Kuroshiodaphne aurea Stahlschmidt, Poppe & Tagaro, 2018
- Kuroshiodaphne fuscobalteata Smith E. A., 1879
- Kuroshiodaphne phaeacme Sysoev, 1990
- Kuroshiodaphne saturata Reeve, 1845
- Kuroshiodaphne subula Reeve, 1845
- Kuroshiodaphne supracancellata Schepman, 1913

Synonyms

- Kuroshiodaphne aureus Stahlschmidt, Poppe & Tagaro, 2018 : synonym of Kuroshiodaphne aurea Stahlschmidt, Poppe & Tagaro, 2018 (incorrect gender ending of specific epithet)
