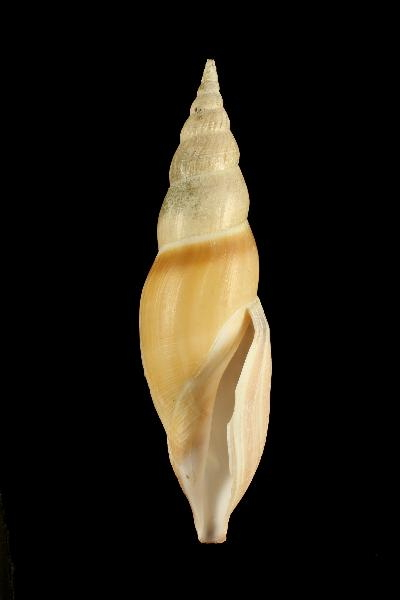
- Shell of Spergo fusiformis (specimen at MNHN, Paris)

Scientific classification
- Kingdom: Animalia
- Phylum: Mollusca
- Class: Gastropoda
- Subclass: Caenogastropoda
- Order: Neogastropoda
- Superfamily: Conoidea
- Family: Raphitomidae
- Genus: Spergo
- Species: S. fusiformis

Binomial name
- Spergo fusiformis (Habe, 1962)

Synonyms
- Pontiothauma fusiforme Habe, 1962; Spergo (Speoides) fusiformis (Kuroda & Habe, 1961)

= Spergo fusiformis =

Species of gastropod

Spergo fusiformis is a species of sea snail, a marine gastropod mollusk in the family Raphitomidae.

== Description ==
The length of the shell varies between 75 mm and 122 mm. The shell is fusiform, with a pointed apex and a smooth, glossy surface. The coloration is typically a light brown or beige, often with darker spiral bands.

It is found in deep-sea environments, typically at depths ranging from 200 to 1000 meters. It inhabits sandy or muddy substrates where it preys on smaller invertebrates. This species is adapted to cold, high-pressure environments of the deep sea and plays a role in the benthic ecosystem as a predator.

== Distribution ==
This marine species occurs off Madagascar, New Caledonia, China Sea and Japan
