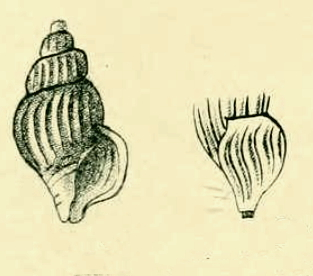
- Shell of Stilla flexicostata

Scientific classification
- Kingdom: Animalia
- Phylum: Mollusca
- Class: Gastropoda
- Subclass: Caenogastropoda
- Order: Neogastropoda
- Superfamily: Conoidea
- Family: Raphitomidae
- Genus: Stilla; Finlay, 1926

Type species
- Mangilia flexicostata Suter, 1899

Species
- See text

= Stilla =

Genus of gastropods

Stilla is a genus of sea snails, marine gastropod mollusks in the family Raphitomidae.

== Distribution ==
This genus occurs off New Zealand.

== Species ==
Species within the genus Stilla include:

- Stilla anomala Powell, 1955
- Stilla delicatula Powell, 1927
- Stilla fiordlandica Fleming C., 1948
- Stilla flexicostata (Suter, 1899)
- Stilla paucicostata Powell, 1937
