= Trochodaphne =

Scientific classification
- Kingdom: Animalia
- Phylum: Mollusca
- Class: Gastropoda
- Subclass: Caenogastropoda
- Order: Neogastropoda
- Superfamily: Conoidea
- Family: Raphitomidae
- Genus: Trochodaphne; Criscione, Hallan, Puillandre & Fedosov, 2020

Type species
- Trochodaphne cuprosa Criscione, Hallan, Puillandre & Fedosov, 2020 (type by original designation)

Genus of gastropods

Trochodaphne is a genus of sea snails, marine gastropod mollusks in the family Raphitomidae.

== Species ==
- Trochodaphne cuprosa Criscione, Hallan, Puillandre & Fedosov, 2020
