= Austrotheta subrosea =

Scientific classification
- Kingdom: Animalia
- Phylum: Mollusca
- Class: Gastropoda
- Subclass: Caenogastropoda
- Order: Neogastropoda
- Superfamily: Conoidea
- Family: Raphitomidae
- Genus: Austrotheta
- Species: A. subrosea

Binomial name
- Austrotheta subrosea (Barnard, 1963)

Synonyms
- Typhlosyrinx subrosea Barnard, 1963; Xanthodaphne subrosea (Barnard, 1963) superseded combination

Species of gastropod

Austrotheta subrosea is a species of sea snail, a marine gastropod mollusk in the family Raphitomidae.

== Distribution ==
This marine species occurs off South Africa.
