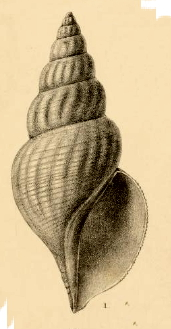
- Original image of a shell of Pontiothauma mirabile

Scientific classification
- Kingdom: Animalia
- Phylum: Mollusca
- Class: Gastropoda
- Subclass: Caenogastropoda
- Order: Neogastropoda
- Superfamily: Conoidea
- Family: Raphitomidae
- Genus: Pontiothauma
- Species: P. mirabile

Binomial name
- Pontiothauma mirabile E.A. Smith, 1895

= Pontiothauma mirabile =

Species of gastropod

Pontiothauma mirabile is a species of sea snail, a marine gastropod mollusk in the family Raphitomidae.

== Description ==
The length of the shell attains 136 mm, its diameter 52 mm.

The turreted, fusiform shell is white. The epidermis is more or less assumed. The spire is elongated and acuminate. The shell contains probably 10 whorls with seven whorls remaining. These are convex, slowly and regularly increasing. They contain oblique and flexuous ribs (with their upper part and lower part fading away) and strong and close spiral lirae. The body whorl is somewhat swollen. The aperture is elongate and measures about half the length of the shell. The siphonal canal is short. The columella is nearly straight. The outer lip is not incrassate and shows a wide, but not deep, sinus at the suture. It is prominent and arcuate in the middle.

== Distribution ==
This marine species occurs in the Bay of Bengal.
