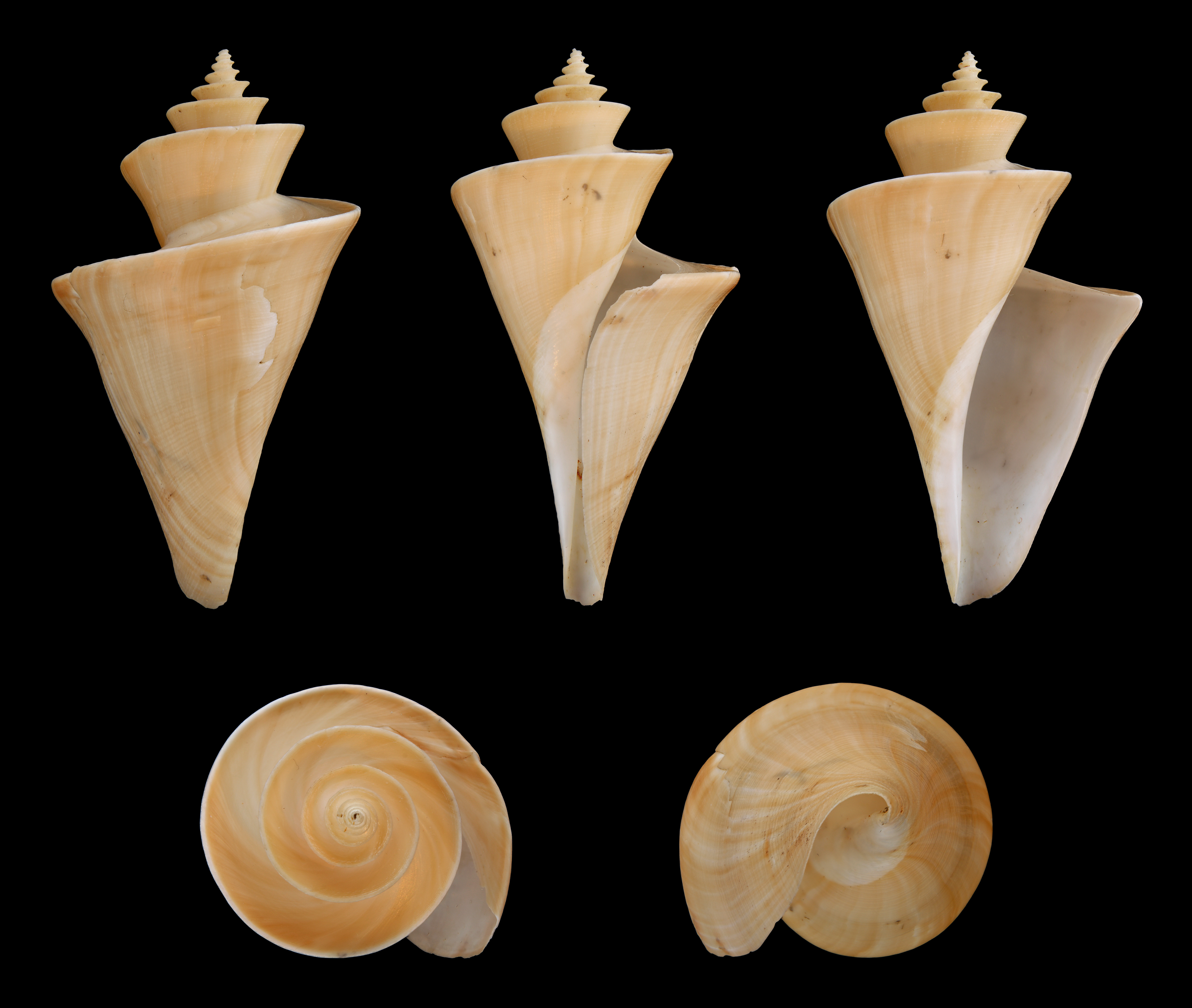
- Shell and protoconch of Thatcheria mirabilis

Scientific classification
- Kingdom: Animalia
- Phylum: Mollusca
- Class: Gastropoda
- Subclass: Caenogastropoda
- Order: Neogastropoda
- Superfamily: Conoidea
- Family: Raphitomidae
- Genus: Thatcheria; Angas, 1877

Type species
- Thatcheria mirabilis Angas, 1877

Species
- See text

Synonyms
- Cochlioconus Yokoyama, 1928; † Waitara Marwick, 1931

= Thatcheria =

Genus of gastropods

Thatcheria is a genus of sea snails, marine gastropod mollusks in the family Raphitomidae.

== Description ==
(Original description) The solid shell is angularly pyriform. The spire is prominent, shorter than the aperture. It is many-whorled with whorls flattened above, strongly keeled at the periphery and contracted below. The aperture shows a broad incurved sinus between the extremity of the last keel and the junction of the body whorl. The siphonal canal is wide and open. The columella is smooth. The outer lip is simple below the sinus.

== Species ==
Species within the genus Thatcheria include:

- † Thatcheria circumfossa (Koenen, 1872)
- Thatcheria janae Lorenz & Stahlschmidt, 2019
- † Thatcheria liratula (Powell, 1942)
- Thatcheria mirabilis Angas, 1877
- † Thatcheria pagodula (Powell, 1942)
- † Thatcheria waitaraensis (Marwick, 1926)
