= Pagodibela =

Scientific classification
- Kingdom: Animalia
- Phylum: Mollusca
- Class: Gastropoda
- Subclass: Caenogastropoda
- Order: Neogastropoda
- Superfamily: Conoidea
- Family: Raphitomidae
- Genus: Pagodibela; Criscione, Hallan, Puillandre & Fedosov, 2020

Type species
- Pagodibela maia Criscione, 2020

Genus of gastropods

Pagodibela is a genus of sea snails, marine gastropod mollusks in the family Raphitomidae.

== Species ==
- Pagodibela baruna (Sysoev, 1997)
- Pagodibela maia Criscione, 2020
- Pagodibela meridionalis Hallan, Criscione, Fedosov & Puillandre, 2021
- Pagodibela pacifica Hallan, Criscione, Fedosov & Puillandre, 2021
