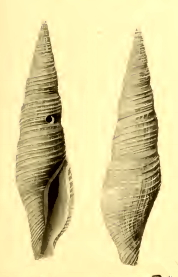
- Original image of a shell of Kuroshiodaphne supracancellata

Scientific classification
- Kingdom: Animalia
- Phylum: Mollusca
- Class: Gastropoda
- Subclass: Caenogastropoda
- Order: Neogastropoda
- Superfamily: Conoidea
- Family: Raphitomidae
- Genus: Kuroshiodaphne
- Species: K. supracancellata

Binomial name
- Kuroshiodaphne supracancellata (Schepman, 1913)

Synonyms
- Daphnella supracancellata Schepman, 1913; Maoridaphne supracancellata (Schepman, 1913)

= Kuroshiodaphne supracancellata =

Species of gastropod

Kuroshiodaphne supracancellata is a species of sea snail, a marine gastropod mollusc in the family Raphitomidae.

== Description ==
The length of the shell attains 23.5 mm, its diameter 6 mm.

The strong shell is elongately-fusiform, with long, slender spire and a short siphonal canal. It is yellowish-grey. The shell contains 11 whorls, of which about 3 form a convexly-whorled protoconch, with the common criss-cross lines. The subsequent whorls are slightly convex, separated by a linear, indistinct suture, bordered by a narrow excavation. The sculpture consists of rounded ribs, on a little more than 4 following whorls, disappearing on lower whorls. They are all crossed by spiral lirae, 9 in number on penultimate whorl, of which one borders the suture, another the excavation, about 30 on the body whorl and the siphonal canal, besides a few intermediate ones on this body whorl, scarcely appreciable on the upper ones. These lirae produce a cancellation on the upper 4 post-nuclear whorls (hence the name); moreover there are numerous finer spiral lines between the principal ones, making the whole shell spirally striated, crossed by more or less conspicuous growth-striae, strongly incised at intervals, closer on last part of the body whorl, making the principal lirae nearly beaded. The aperture is oblong, narrow above, at the rather deep sinus and below al the siphonal canal;. The peristome is rather strong, much contracted at the limit of the siphonal canal, interiorly with short grooves, corresponding to the lirae and subdenticulate in the interstices of these grooves. The columellar margin is slightly concave above, then nearly straight, with a thin layer of enamel, which is faintly multiplicate. The interior of the aperture is smooth, bluish white. The peristome is bordered by a greyish zone.

== Distribution ==
This marine species occurs off Indonesia
