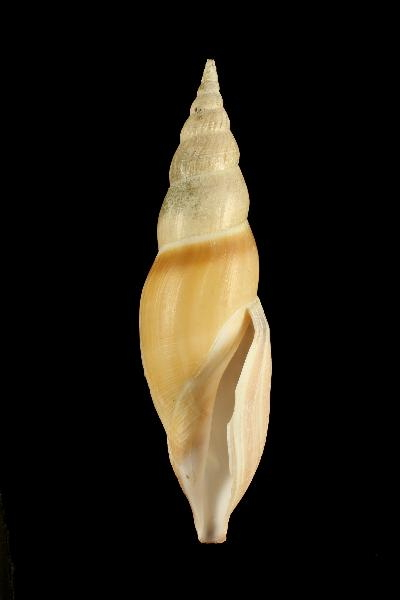
- Shell of Spergo fusiformis

Scientific classification
- Kingdom: Animalia
- Phylum: Mollusca
- Class: Gastropoda
- Subclass: Caenogastropoda
- Order: Neogastropoda
- Superfamily: Conoidea
- Family: Raphitomidae
- Genus: Spergo; Dall, 1895

Type species
- Mangilia glandiniformis Dall, 1895

Species
- See text

Synonyms
- Mangilia (Spergo) Dall, 1895 (original rank); Speoides Kuroda & Habe, 1961; Spergo (Speoides) Kuroda & Habe, 1961

= Spergo =

Genus of gastropods

Spergo is a genus of sea snails, marine gastropod mollusks in the family Raphitomidae.

== Description ==
The large, thin shell is nearly destitute of sculpture. It shows an unrecurved columella, a short, wide, straight siphonal canal, a wide shallow emargination representing the anal notch, and generally feeble anal fasciole, except in the very young. There is a sharp outer lip, unarmed aperture, and a sinusigera protoconch.

The animal has a muzzle formed by a stout squarely truncated rostrum opening into a capacious pharynx, provided internally with a degenerate proboscis not capable of extrusion beyond the oral orifice, with a poison gland and a degenerate radula. Eyes are present and functional. The tentacles are low-seated, stout, and clavate. The operculum is absent. The dentition resembles that of Bela.

This form resembles Pleurotomella, Verrill, from which it differs in the character of the rostrum and pharynx, in the possession of eyes, in its straight wide siphonal canal, and in having a feebler type of verge, anal notch and fasciole.

== Species ==
Species within the genus Spergo include:

- Spergo africana (Sysoev, 1996)
- Spergo aithorrhis Sysoev & Bouchet, 2001
- Spergo annulata Criscione, Hallan, Puillandre & Fedosov, 2021
- Spergo bululi (Stahlschmidt, Poppe & Tagaro, 2018)
- Spergo castellum Criscione, Hallan, Puillandre & Fedosov, 2021
- Spergo chuni (E. von Martens, 1901)
- Spergo daphnelloides (Dall, 1895)
- † Spergo fusus MacNeil, 1961
- Spergo glandiniformis (Dall, 1895)
- Spergo oculifera (Kantor & Sysoev, 1986)
- Spergo parunculis Stahlschmidt, Chino & Fraussen, 2015
- Spergo parvidentata Criscione, Hallan, Puillandre & Fedosov, 2021
- Spergo sibogae Schepman, 1913
- Spergo tenuiconcha Criscione, Hallan, Puillandre & Fedosov, 2021

Species brought into synonymy

- Spergo fusiformis (Habe, 1962): synonym of Speoides fusiformis (Kuroda & T. Habe, 1961) (superseded combination)
- Spergo glandiformis (Dall, 1895): synonym of Spergo glandiniformis (Dall, 1895) (misspelling)
- Spergo nipponensis Okutani & Iwahori, 1992: synonym of Borsonia nipponensis (Okutani & Iwahori, 1992) (superseded combination)
- Spergo (Speoides) yoshidai (Kuroda & Habe, 1961): synonym of Speoides yoshidai Kuroda & T. Habe, 1961 (superseded combination)
