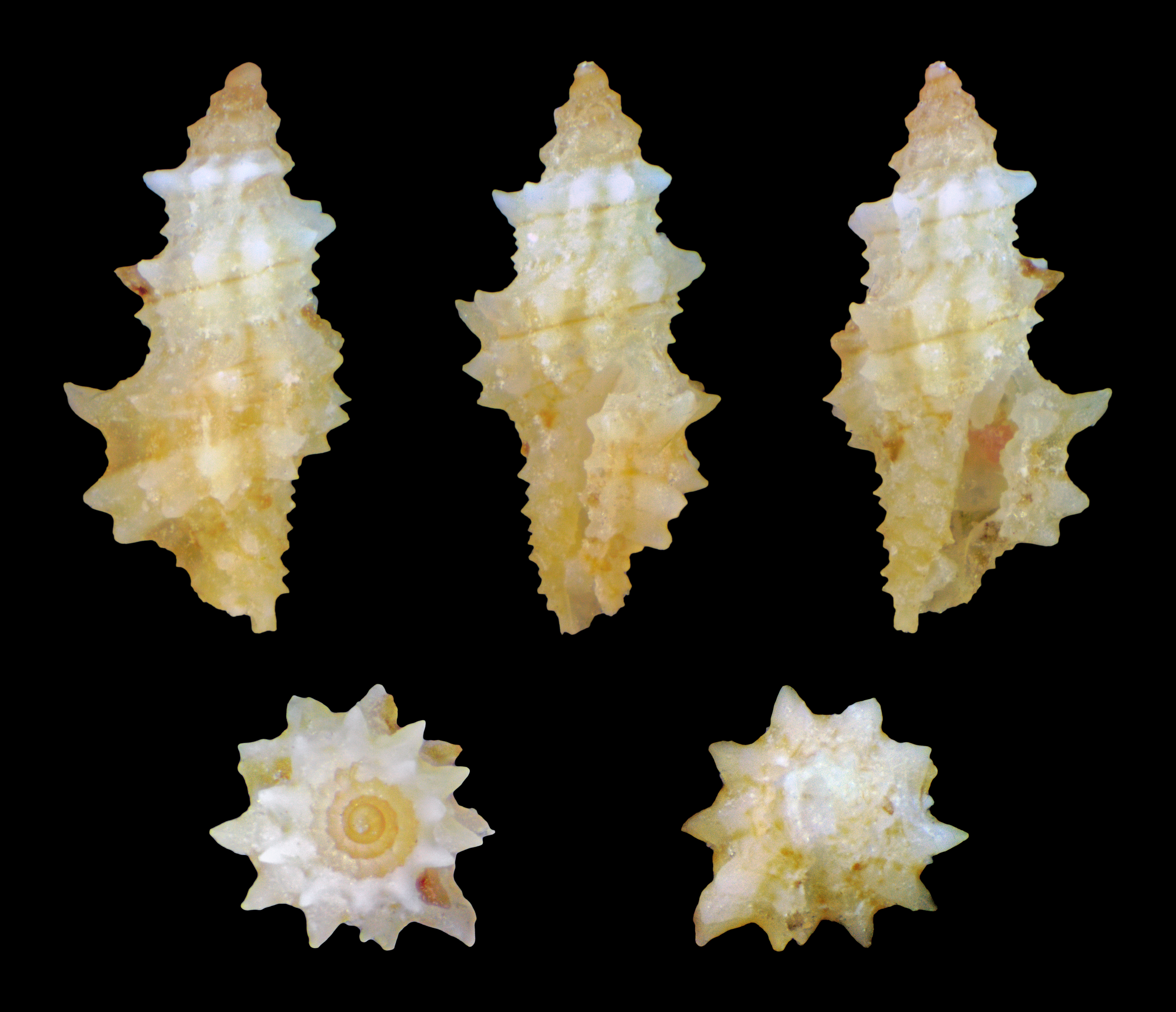
- Shell of Microdaphne trichodes (Dall, 1919)

Scientific classification
- Kingdom: Animalia
- Phylum: Mollusca
- Class: Gastropoda
- Subclass: Caenogastropoda
- Order: Neogastropoda
- Superfamily: Conoidea
- Family: Raphitomidae
- Genus: Microdaphne; McLean, 1971

Type species
- Philbertia trichodes Dall, 1919

Species
- See text

= Microdaphne =

Genus of gastropods

Microdaphne is a genus of sea snails, marine gastropod mollusks in the family Raphitomidae.

== Species ==
Species within the genus Microdaphne include:

- † Microdaphne indohystrix Harzhauser, 2014
- Microdaphne morrisoni Rehder, 1980
- Microdaphne trichodes (Dall, 1919)
