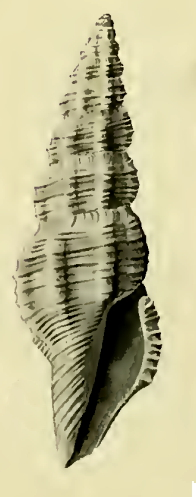
- Vepridaphne cestrum

Scientific classification
- Kingdom: Animalia
- Phylum: Mollusca
- Class: Gastropoda
- Subclass: Caenogastropoda
- Order: Neogastropoda
- Superfamily: Conoidea
- Family: Raphitomidae
- Genus: Vepridaphne; Shuto, 1983

= Vepridaphne =

Genus of gastropods

Vepridaphne is a genus of sea snails, marine gastropod mollusks in the family Raphitomidae.

== Species ==
Species within the genus Vepridaphne include:

- Vepridaphne cestrum (Hedley, 1922)
