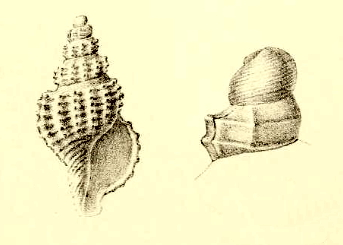
- Original image of a shell of Raphitoma nivea

Scientific classification
- Kingdom: Animalia
- Phylum: Mollusca
- Class: Gastropoda
- Subclass: Caenogastropoda
- Order: Neogastropoda
- Superfamily: Conoidea
- Family: Raphitomidae
- Genus: Raphitoma
- Species: R. nivea

Binomial name
- Raphitoma nivea (J. T. Marshall in Sykes, 1906)

Synonyms
- Clathurella nivea Monterosato, 1875 (original combination); Defrancia reticulata, var. nivea Monterosato, 1875; Pleurotoma {Homotoma) nivea Monterosato, 1878

= Raphitoma nivea =

Species of mollusc

Raphitoma nivea is a species of sea snail, a marine gastropod mollusk in the family Raphitomidae.

== Description ==
This species has a broad twisted apex of two whorls. It resembles Raphitoma echinata (Brocchi, 1814) (synonym of Raphitoma reticulata Renier, 1804) in size, sculpture, and outlines, but R. echinata has a slender and acute apex of four whorls.

== Distribution ==
This marine species occurs off Algeria.
