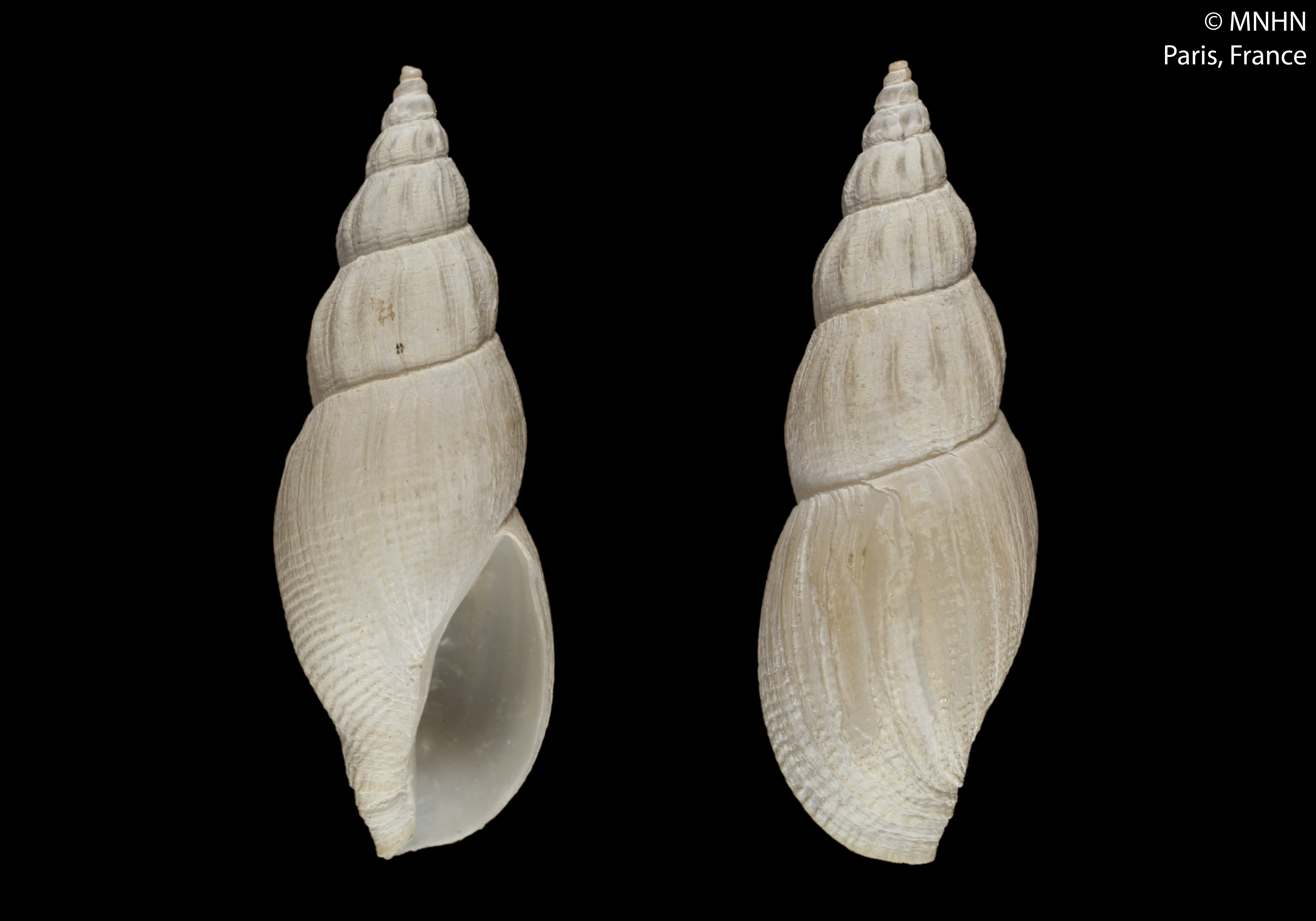
- Rocroithys perissus

Scientific classification
- Kingdom: Animalia
- Phylum: Mollusca
- Class: Gastropoda
- Subclass: Caenogastropoda
- Order: Neogastropoda
- Superfamily: Conoidea
- Family: Raphitomidae
- Genus: Rocroithys; Sysoev & Bouchet, 2001

Type species
- Rocroithys perissus Sysoev & Bouchet, 2001

Species
- See text

= Rocroithys =

Genus of gastropods

Rocroithys is a genus of sea snails, marine gastropod mollusks in the family Raphitomidae.

== Species ==
Species within the genus Rocroithys include:

- Rocroithys niveus Sysoev & Bouchet, 2001
- Rocroithys perissus Sysoev & Bouchet, 2001

Species brought into synonymy

- Rocroithys nivea Sysoev & Bouchet, 2001: synonym of Rocroithys niveus Sysoev & Bouchet, 2001 (Misspelling. Wrong gender agreement.)
