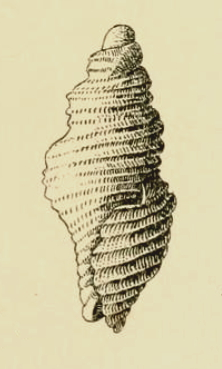
- Microgenia edwini

Scientific classification
- Kingdom: Animalia
- Phylum: Mollusca
- Class: Gastropoda
- Subclass: Caenogastropoda
- Order: Neogastropoda
- Superfamily: Conoidea
- Family: Raphitomidae
- Genus: Microgenia; Laseron, 1954

Type species
- Pleurotoma edwini Brazier in Henn, 1894

Species
- See text

= Microgenia (gastropod) =

Genus of gastropods

Microgenia is a genus of sea snails, marine gastropod mollusks in the family Raphitomidae.

== Species ==
Species within the genus Microgenia include:

- Microgenia edwini (Brazier in Henn, 1894)
