= Thatcherina =

Scientific classification
- Kingdom: Animalia
- Phylum: Mollusca
- Class: Gastropoda
- Subclass: Caenogastropoda
- Order: Neogastropoda
- Family: Raphitomidae
- Genus: Thatcherina; Vera-Pelaez, 1998

Genus of gastropods

Thatcherina is a genus of sea snails, marine gastropod mollusks in the family Raphitomidae.

== Species ==
Species within the genus Thatcherina include:

- Thatcherina diazi Gracia & Vera-Peláez, 2004
