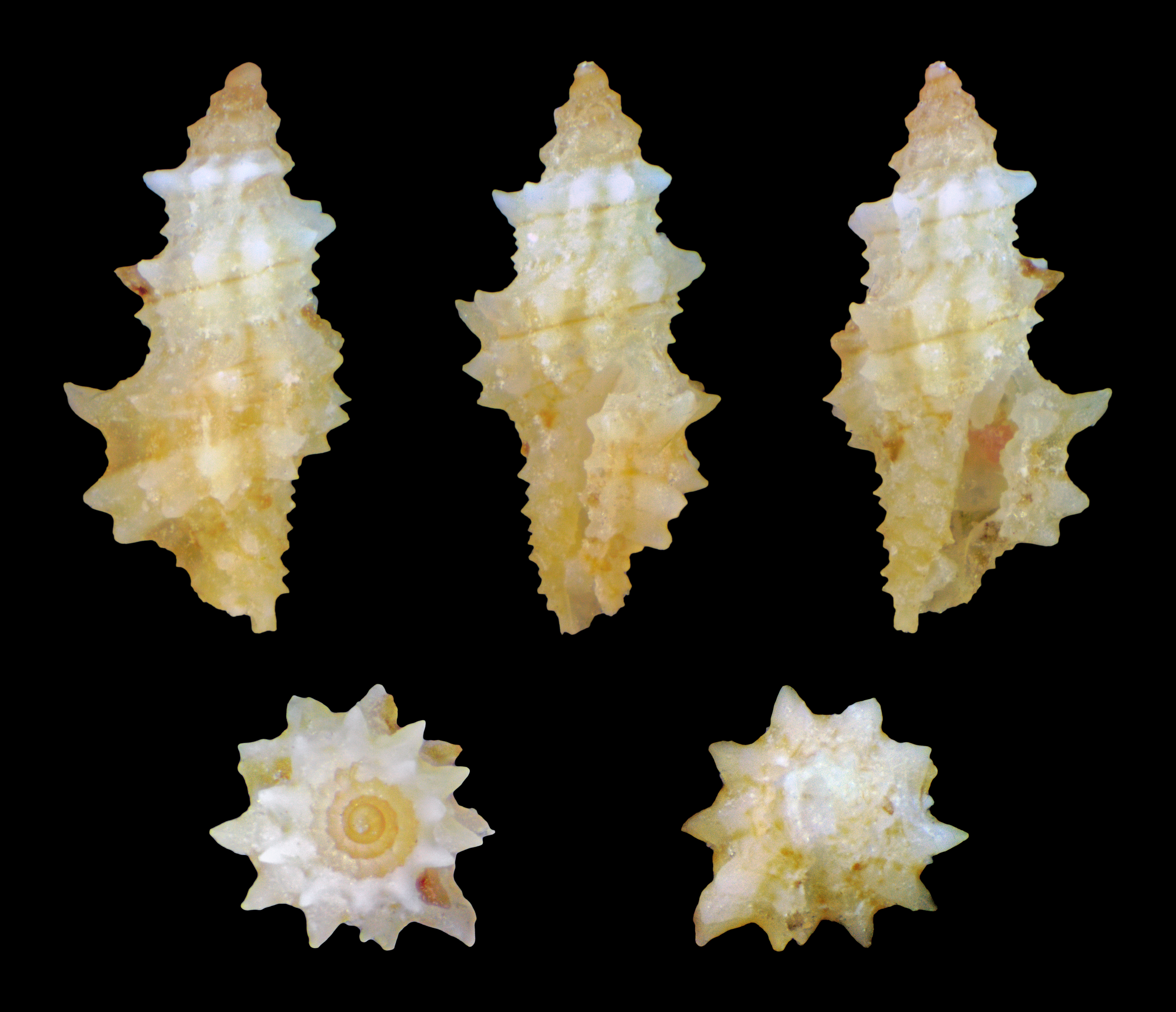
- Shell ofMicrodaphne trichodes (Dall, 1919)

Scientific classification
- Kingdom: Animalia
- Phylum: Mollusca
- Class: Gastropoda
- Subclass: Caenogastropoda
- Order: Neogastropoda
- Superfamily: Conoidea
- Family: Raphitomidae
- Genus: Microdaphne
- Species: M. trichodes

Binomial name
- Microdaphne trichodes (Dall, 1919)

Synonyms
- Clathurella hirsuta (De Folin, 1867); Heterocithara hirsuta (De Folin, 1867); Kermia hirsuta (de Folin, 1867); Mangilia hirsuta (De Folin, 1867); Microdaphne trichodes (Dall, 1919); Philbertia trichodes Dall, 1919 (replacement name; for Pleurotoma hirsutum Folin, 1867); Philbertia trichoides [sic]; Pleurotoma hirsutum De Folin, 1867 (junior homonym; not Pleurotoma hirsutum Bellardi, 1847)

= Microdaphne trichodes =

Species of gastropod

Microdaphne trichodes is a species of sea snail, a marine gastropod mollusk in the family Raphitomidae.

== Description ==
The length of the shell attains 3.4 mm.

The shell is yellowish white, the earlier whorls darker.

== Distribution ==
This species has a wide distribution in the Pacific Ocean; also off Queensland, Australia.
