= Abyssobela =

Scientific classification
- Kingdom: Animalia
- Phylum: Mollusca
- Class: Gastropoda
- Subclass: Caenogastropoda
- Order: Neogastropoda
- Superfamily: Conoidea
- Family: Raphitomidae
- Genus: Abyssobela; Kantor & Sysoev, 1986

Type species
- Abyssobela atoxica Kantor & Sysoev, 1986

Species
- See text

Genus of gastropods

Abyssobela is a genus of sea snails, marine gastropod mollusks in the family Raphitomidae.

== Species ==
Species within the genus Abyssobela include:

- Abyssobela atoxica Kantor & Sysoev, 1986
