= Rocroithys niveus =

Scientific classification
- Kingdom: Animalia
- Phylum: Mollusca
- Class: Gastropoda
- Subclass: Caenogastropoda
- Order: Neogastropoda
- Superfamily: Conoidea
- Family: Raphitomidae
- Genus: Rocroithys
- Species: R. niveus

Binomial name
- Rocroithys niveus Sysoev & Bouchet, 2001

Synonyms
- Rocroithys nivea Sysoev & Bouchet, 2001 (misspelling; wrong gender agreement)

Species of gastropod

Rocroithys niveus is a species of sea snail, a marine gastropod mollusk in the family Raphitomidae.

== Description ==
The shell reaches a length of 25.5 mm.

== Distribution ==
This marine species occurs off Vanuatu, the Norfolk Ridge, New Hebrides.
