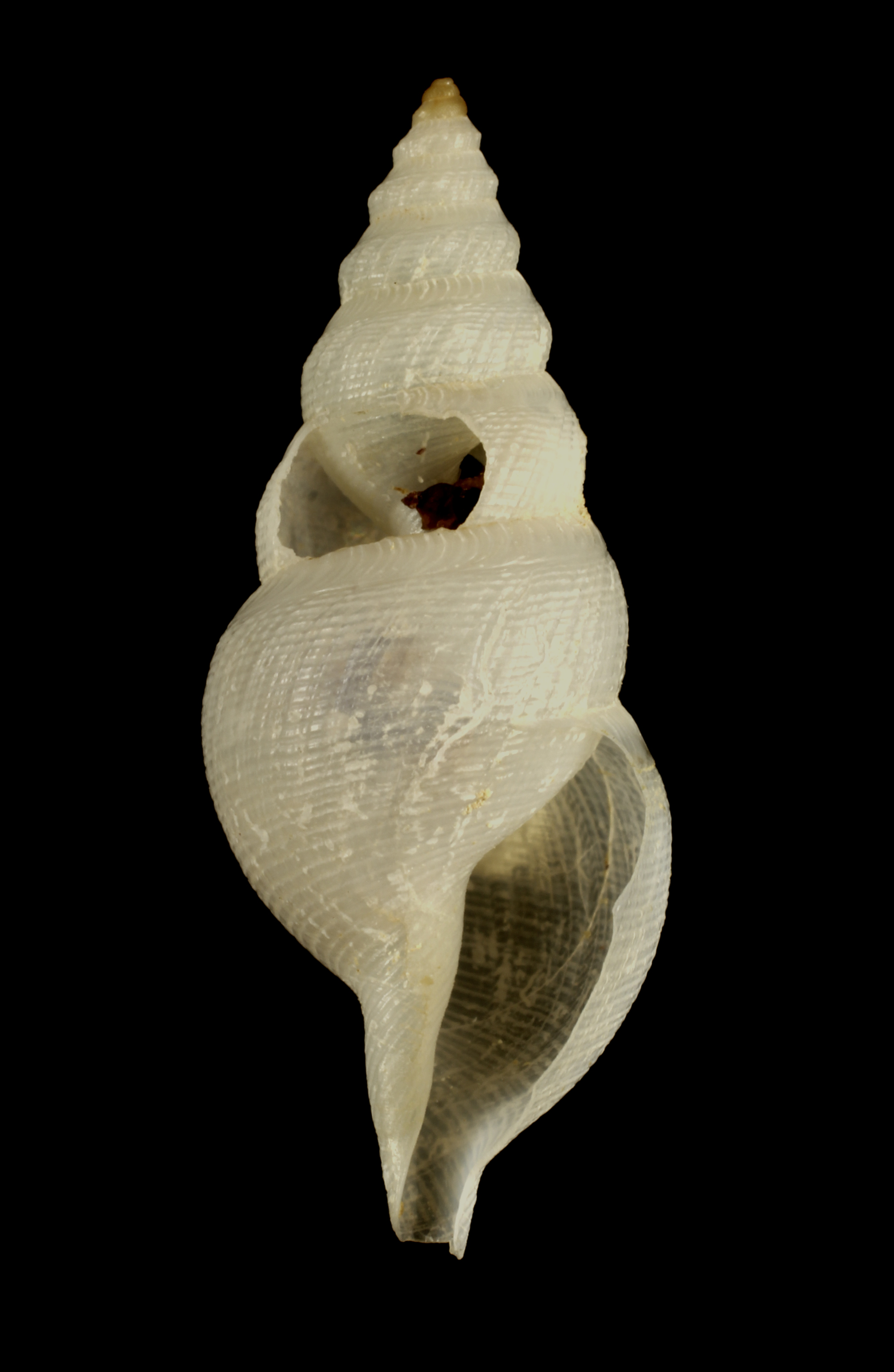
- Shell of Gladiobela vitrea (holotype at MNHN, Paris)

Scientific classification
- Kingdom: Animalia
- Phylum: Mollusca
- Class: Gastropoda
- Subclass: Caenogastropoda
- Order: Neogastropoda
- Superfamily: Conoidea
- Family: Raphitomidae
- Genus: Gladiobela; Criscione, Hallan, Puillandre & Fedosov, 2020

Type species
- Gladiobela angulata Criscione, Hallan, Puillandre & Fedosov, 2020

= Gladiobela =

Genus of gastropods

Gladiobela is a genus of sea snails, marine gastropod mollusks in the family Raphitomidae.

== Species ==
Species within the genus Gladiobela include:

- Gladiobela abyssicola Hallan, Criscione, Fedosov & Puillandre, 2021
- Gladiobela acris Hallan, Criscione, Fedosov & Puillandre, 2021
- Gladiobela angulata Criscione, Hallan, Puillandre & Fedosov, 2020
- Gladiobela sinuosa Hallan, Criscione, Fedosov & Puillandre, 2021
- Gladiobela stupa Hallan, Criscione, Fedosov & Puillandre, 2021
- Gladiobela vitrea Hallan, Criscione, Fedosov & Puillandre, 2021
