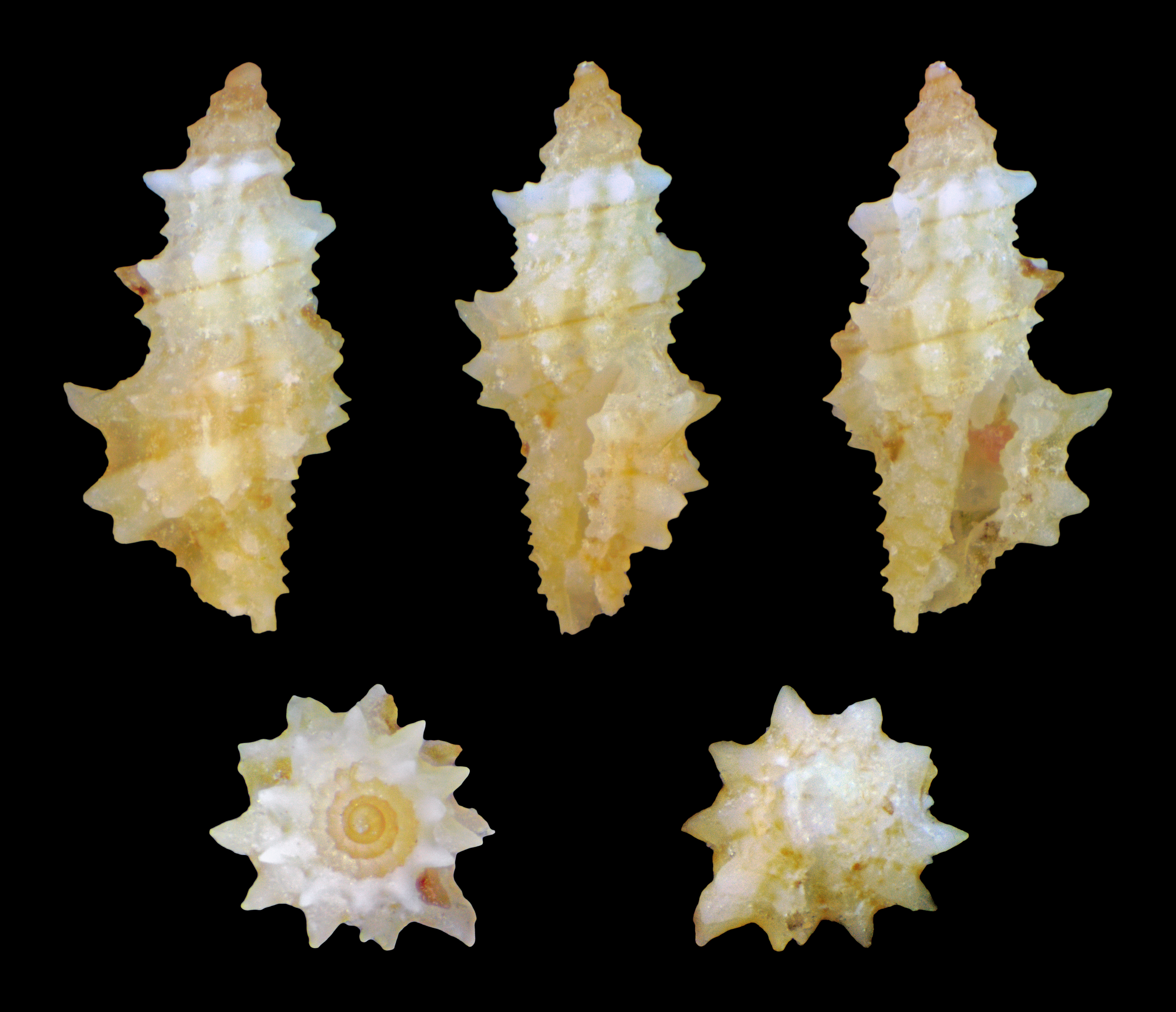
- Microdaphne trichodes shell

Scientific classification
- Kingdom: Animalia
- Phylum: Mollusca
- Class: Gastropoda
- Subclass: Caenogastropoda
- Order: Neogastropoda
- Superfamily: Conoidea
- Family: Raphitomidae; A. Bellardi, 1875

Type genus
- Raphitoma Bellardi, 1847

Synonyms
- list: Andoniinae Vera Peláez, 2002; Daphnellinae T. L. Casey, 1904; Pleurotomellinae F. Nordsieck, 1968; Taraninae T. L. Casey, 1904; Thatcheriidae Powell, 1942; Raphitominae A. Bellardi, 1875 (new rank)

= Raphitomidae =

Family of sea snails

Raphitomidae is a family of small to medium-sized sea snails, marine gastropod mollusks in the superfamily Conoidea.

Bouchet, Kantor et al. elevated in 2011 the subfamily Raphitominae (which at that point had been placed in the family Conidae) to the rank of family. This was based on a cladistic analysis of shell morphology, radular characteristics, anatomical characters, and a dataset of molecular sequences of three gene fragments. The family was found to be monophyletic.

== Description ==
The Raphitomidae is the largest, most diverse and most variable taxon in the Conoidea, with the greatest number of species and the largest ecological range (from the tropics to the pole) and largest vertical range (intertidal to hadal depths).

The shells of species in the Raphitomidae are very variable in shape (buccinoid to ovate, elongate-fusiform, or high-cylindrical) and size (2 to 140 mm in height). Similarly, shell sculpture is extremely variable, from nearly smooth to well developed spiral and axial elements and subsutural ramps. Common morphology includes apertural armature rarely well developed, inner lip usually smooth, no operculum, radular tooth hypodermic in character with marginal teeth of variable morphology (including variable length).

The muscular bulb of the venom gland is always single-layered. The close relationship of Raphitomidae with cone snails (which are already under intensive study for the pharmaceutical applications of their toxins), makes them an interesting candidate for the discovery of new toxins.

Another characteristic is the multispiral protoconch, which shows spiral striae on protoconch I and diagonally cancellated ("raphitomine") sculpture on protoconch II.

Some species with a paucispiral protoconch are included in the family. This is usually based on similarities in shell morphology to species having a "raphitomine" protoconch. This determination should also ideally be founded on other attributes, such as the type of radula or foregut anatomy or their lack of an operculum.

== Genera ==
This is a list of the accepted names of genera in the family Raphitomidae (the main reference for recent species is the World Register of Marine Species)

- Abyssobela Kantor & Sysoev, 1986
- Abyssothauma Sysoev, 1996
- Acamptodaphne Shuto, 1971
- Acanthodaphne Bonfitto & Morassi, 2006
- Aliceia Dautzenberg & H. Fischer, 1897
- Aplotoma Criscione, Hallan, Puillandre & Fedosov, 2020
- Asperdaphne Hedley, 1922
- Austrobela Criscione, Hallan, Puillandre & Fedosov, 2020
- Austrodaphnella Laseron, 1954
- Austropusilla Laseron, 1954
- Austrotheta Criscione, Hallan, Puillandre & Fedosov, 2020
- Awheaturris Beu, 1970
- Bathybela Kobelt, 1905
- Buccinaria Kittl, 1887
- Biconitoma Criscione, Hallan, Puillandre & Fedosov, 2020
- Clathromangelia Monterosato, 1884
- Clinura Bellardi, 1875
- Cryptodaphne Powell, 1942
- Cyrillia Kobelt, 1905
- Daphnella Hinds, 1844
- Diaugasma Melvill, 1917
- Eubela Dall, 1889
- Eucyclotoma Boettger, 1895
- Exomilus Hedley, 1918
- Famelica Bouchet & Warén, 1980
- Favriella Hornung, 1920
- Fusobela Criscione, Hallan, Puillandre & Fedosov, 2020
- Glaciotomella Criscione, Hallan, Puillandre & Fedosov, 2020
- Gladiobela Criscione, Hallan, Puillandre & Fedosov, 2020
- Globodaphne Criscione, Hallan, Puillandre & Fedosov, 2020
- Glyphostomoides Shuto, 1983
- Gymnobela Verrill, 1884
- Hemilienardia Boettger, 1895
- † Hokianga Laws, 1947
- Isodaphne Laseron, 1954
- Kermia Oliver, 1915
- Kuroshiodaphne Shuto, 1965
- Leiosyrinx Bouchet & A. Sysoev, 2001
- Leufroyia Monterosato, 1884
- Lusitanops F. Nordsieck, 1968
- † Maoridaphne Powell, 1942
- Microdaphne McLean, 1971
- Microgenia Laseron, 1954
- Mioawateria Vella, 1954
- Neopleurotomoides Shuto, 1971
- Nepotilla Hedley, 1918
- Nodothauma Criscione, Hallan, Puillandre & Fedosov, 2020
- † Onoketoma Beu, 2011
- Pagodibela Criscione, Hallan, Puillandre & Fedosov, 2020
- Pagodidaphne Shuto, 1983
- Paramontana Laseron, 1954
- Phymorhynchus Dall, 1908
- Pleurotomella Verrill, 1872
- Pontiothauma E.A. Smith, 1895
- Pseudodaphnella Boettger, 1895
- † Pseudolusitanops Lozouet, 2017
- Pueridaphne Criscione, Hallan, Puillandre & Fedosov, 2020
- † Puha Marwick, 1931
- Raphitoma Bellardi, 1847
- Rimosodaphnella Cossmann, 1916
- Rocroithys Sysoev & Bouchet, 2001
- Spergo Dall, 1895
- Stilla Finlay, 1926
- Taranidaphne Morassi & Bonfitto, 2001
- Taranis Jeffreys, 1870
- Teleochilus Harris, 1897
- Teretia Norman, 1888
- Teretiopsis Kantor & Sysoev, 1989
- Thatcheria Angas, 1877
- Thatcheriasyrinx Powell, 1969
- Thatcherina Vera-Pelaez, 1998
- Thesbia Jeffreys, 1867
- Theta A.H. Clarke, 1959
- Thetidos Hedley, 1899 - as a separate genus or as a synonym of Lienardia
- Tritonoturris Dall, 1924
- Trochodaphne Criscione, Hallan, Puillandre & Fedosov, 2020
- Truncadaphne McLean, 1971
- Tuskaroria Sysoev, 1988
- Typhlosyrinx Thiele, 1925
- Veprecula Melvill, 1917
- Vepridaphne Shuto, 1983
- Vitjazinella Sysoev, 1988
- Xanthodaphne Powell, 1942
- Zenepos Finlay, 1926

== Synonyms ==
- Allo Jousseaume, 1934: synonym of Taranis Jeffreys, 1870
- Anomalotomella Powell, 1966: synonym of Pleurotomella Verrill, 1872
- Aspertilla Powell, 1944: synonym of Asperdaphne Hedley, 1922
- Azorilla F. Nordsieck, 1968; synonym of Teretia Norman, 1888.
- Azorita F. Nordsieck, 1968: synonym of Pleurotomella Verrill, 1872
- Bathypota F. Nordsieck, 1968: synonym of Bathybela Kobelt, 1905
- Cenodagreutes E.H. Smith, 1967: synonym of Raphitoma Bellardi, 1847
- Cirillia Monterosato, 1884: synonym of Philbertia Monterosato, 1884
- Clathurina Melvill, 1917 : synonym of Kermia Oliver, 1915
- Cochlioconus Yokoyama, 1928: synonym of Thatcheria Angas, 1877
- Cordiera: synonym of Cordieria Rouault, 1848
- Cyrtoides F. Nordsieck, 1968: synonym of Raphitoma Bellardi, 1847
- Eudaphne Bartsch, 1931: synonym of Daphnella Hinds, 1844
- Eudaphnella Bartsch, 1933: synonym of Daphnella Hinds, 1844
- Feliciella Lamy, 1934: synonym of Taranis Jeffreys, 1870
- Fenestrosyrinx Finlay, 1926 : synonym of Taranis Jeffreys, 1870
- Fusidaphne Laseron, 1954: synonym of Pleurotomella Verrill, 1872 (synonym)
- Hemidaphne Hedley, 1918: synonym of Daphnella Hinds, 1844
- Homotoma Bellardi, 1875: synonym of Philbertia Monterosato, 1884
- Leufroyia Monterosato, 1884: synonym of Philbertia Monterosato, 1884
- Lineotoma F. Nordsieck, 1977: synonym of Philbertia Monterosato, 1884
- Litachilus Powell, 1944: synonym of Teleochilus Harris, 1897
- Magnella Dittmer, 1960: synonym of Mioawateria Vella, 1954
- Majox F. Nordsieck, 1968: synonym of Gymnobela Verrill, 1884
- Metaclathurella Shuto, 1983: synonym of Otitoma Jousseaume, 1898
- Mordica Dall, 1924: synonym of Veprecula Melvill, 1917
- Ootoma Koperberg, 1931: synonym of Buccinaria Kittl, 1887
- Ootomella Bartsch, 1933: synonym of Buccinaria Kittl, 1887
- Paradaphne Laseron, 1954: synonym of Daphnella Hinds, 1844
- Peratotoma Harris & Burrows, 1891: synonym of Philbertia Monterosato, 1884
- Philbertia Monterosato, 1884: synonym of Raphitoma Bellardi, 1847
- Pionotoma Kuroda, 1952: synonym of Buccinaria Kittl, 1887
- Qii Zhang, 1995: synonym of Pseudodaphnella Boettger, 1895
- Rhaphitoma: synonym of Raphitoma Bellardi, 1848
- Speoides Kuroda & Habe, 1961: synonym of Spergo Dall, 1895
- Teres Bucquoy, Dautzenberg & Dollfus, 1883: synonym of Teretia Norman, 1888
- Tasmadaphne Laseron, 1954: synonym of Pleurotomella Verrill, 1872 (synonym)
- Turrhyssa Dall, 1924: synonym of Eucyclotoma Boettger, 1895
- Watsonaria F. Nordsieck, 1968: synonym of Gymnobela Verrill, 1884
