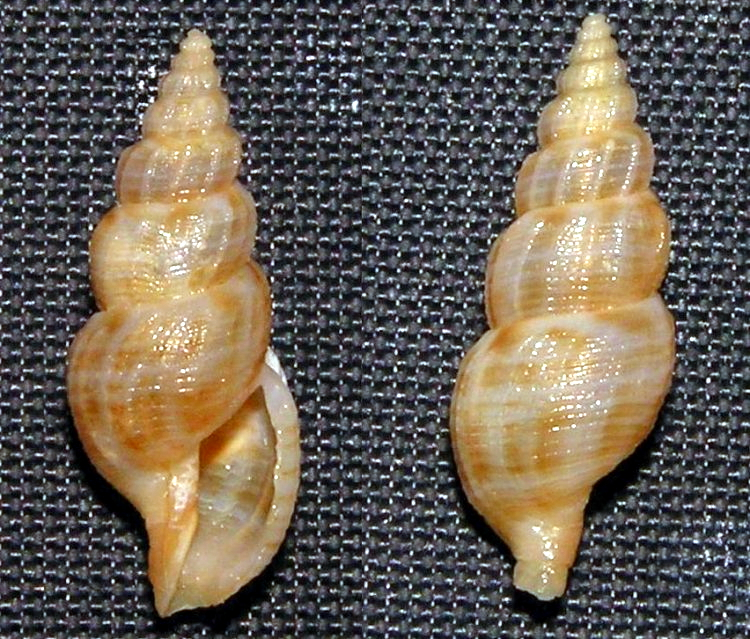
- Shells of Asperdaphne elegantissima

Scientific classification
- Kingdom: Animalia
- Phylum: Mollusca
- Class: Gastropoda
- Subclass: Caenogastropoda
- Order: Neogastropoda
- Superfamily: Conoidea
- Family: Raphitomidae
- Genus: Asperdaphne; Hedley, 1922

Type species
- Daphnella versivestita Hedley, 1912

Synonyms
- List: Asperdaphne (Aspertilla) A. W. B. Powell, 1944 (junior subjective synonym); Aspertilla Powell, 1944; Daphnella (Asperdaphne) Hedley, 1922 superseded rank; Scabrella Hedley, 1918 (Invalid: junior homonym of Scabrella Sacco, 1890; Asperdaphne is a replacement name)

= Asperdaphne =

Genus of gastropods

Asperdaphne is a genus of sea snails, marine gastropod mollusks in the family Raphitomidae.

== Description ==
This genus resembles Daphnella in form and general appearance, but differs in having the protoconch spirally grooved instead of being obliquely reticulated. The contour is lanceolate rather than oval. The shell has usually more whorls, increasing less rapidly, with a longer and more turreted spire. The anal fasciole is usually more marked than in Daphnella, being more excavate, and crossed by sharp crescentic riblets. Some members of this genus have a superficial resemblance to Defrancia, under which genus they have been arranged.

== Distribution ==
This marine genus occurs in the Western Pacific, from Japan to New Zealand; also off Australia (New South Wales, Queensland, South Australia, Tasmania, Victoria).

== Species ==
Species within the genus Asperdaphne include:

- Asperdaphne albovirgulata (Souverbie, 1860)
- Asperdaphne aureola (Reeve, 1845)
- † Asperdaphne balcombensis A. W. B. Powell, 1944
- Asperdaphne bastowi (Gatliff & Gabriel, 1908)
- Asperdaphne bela Hedley, 1922
- Asperdaphne bitorquata (Sowerby III, 1896)
- Asperdaphne colubrariaoides (Stahlschmidt, Chino & E. Tardy, 2022)
- † Asperdaphne contigua A. W. B. Powell, 1944
- Asperdaphne desalesii (Tenison-Woods, 1877)
- Asperdaphne elegantissima (Schepman, 1913)
- Asperdaphne esperanza (May, 1911)
- † Asperdaphne exsculpta A. W. B. Powell, 1944
- Asperdaphne hawaiiensis Wiedrick, 2025
- Asperdaphne kailuensis Wiedrick, 2025
- Asperdaphne laceyi (G.B. Sowerby III, 1889)
- Asperdaphne lactea (Reeve, 1843)
- Asperdaphne legrandi (Beddome, 1883)
- Asperdaphne molokaiensis Wiedrick, 2025
- Asperdaphne moretonica (Smith E. A., 1882)
- Asperdaphne paramoretonica B.-Q. Li & X.-Z. Li, 2014
- Asperdaphne paucicostata (Pease, 1860)
- Asperdaphne peradmirabilis (Smith E. A., 1879)
- Asperdaphne perissa (Hedley, 1909)
- Asperdaphne perplexa (Verco, 1909)
- Asperdaphne plutonis Thiele, 1925
- † Asperdaphne recticostulata Yokoyama, 1922
- Asperdaphne sculptilis (Angas, 1871)
- Asperdaphne subrissoides (Hervier, 1897)
- Asperdaphne subzonata (Smith E. A., 1879)
- Asperdaphne suluensis (Schepman, 1913)
- Asperdaphne tasmanica (Tenison-Woods, 1877)
- Asperdaphne torresensis (Shuto, 1983)
- Asperdaphne trimaculata Cotton, 1947
- Asperdaphne ula (Watson, 1881)
- Asperdaphne versivestita (Hedley, 1912)
- Asperdaphne vestalis (Hedley, 1903)
- Asperdaphne walcotae (Sowerby III, 1893)

Species brought into synonymy

- Asperdaphne aculeata (Webster, 1906): synonym of Pleurotomella aculeata (Webster, 1906)
- Asperdaphne albocincta G.F. Angas, 1871synonym of Apispiralia albocincta (G.F. Angas, 1871)
- Asperdaphne amplecta Hedley, 1922: synonym of Pleurotomella amplecta (Hedley, 1922)
- Asperdaphne angasi Hedley, 1903: synonym of Asperdaphne sculptilis (Angas, 1871)
- Asperdaphne balcombensis Powell 1944 †: synonym of Pleurotomella balcombensis (Powell, 1944) †
- Asperdaphne brenchleyi (Angas, 1877): synonym of Pleurotomella brenchleyi (Angas, 1877)
- Asperdaphne capricornea Hedley, 1922: synonym of Pleurotomella capricornea (Hedley, 1922)
- Asperdaphne compacta Hedley, 1922: synonym of Pleurotomella compacta (Hedley, 1922)
- Asperdaphne contigua Powell, 1944 †: synonym of Pleurotomella contigua (Powell, 1944) †
- Asperdaphne expeditionis Dell, 1956: synonym of Pleurotomella expeditionis (Dell, 1956)
- Asperdaphne hayesiana (Angas, 1871): synonym of Pleurotomella hayesiana (Angas, 1871)
- Asperdaphne rothauseni Gürs, 1998 †: synonym of Pleurotomella rothauseni (Gürs, 1998) †
- Asperdaphne rugosa Laseron, 1954: synonym of Pleurotomella rugosa (Laseron, 1954)
- Asperdaphne sculptilior Tenison-Woods, 1879: synonym of Asperdaphne desalesii (Tenison-Woods, 1877)
- Asperdaphne sexdentata Pritchard & Gatliff, 1899: synonym of Asperdaphne desalesii (Tenison-Woods, 1877)
- Asperdaphne sepulta Laseron, 1954: synonym of Pleurotomella sepulta (Laseron, 1954)
- Asperdaphne tasmanica May, 1916: synonym of Asperdaphne bela Hedley, 1922
- Asperdaphne vercoi (G. B. Sowerby III, 1896): synonym of Pleurotomella vercoi (G.B. Sowerby III, 1896)
