= A. compacta =

A. compacta may refer to:

- Asperdaphne compacta, a sea snail species
- Ayenia compacta, the California ayenia, a shrub species native to the Sonoran Desert and surrounding ranges in California, Arizona and Baja California
- Azorella compacta, the yareta or Llareta, a tiny flowering plant species native to South America

== See also ==
- Compacta (disambiguation)
