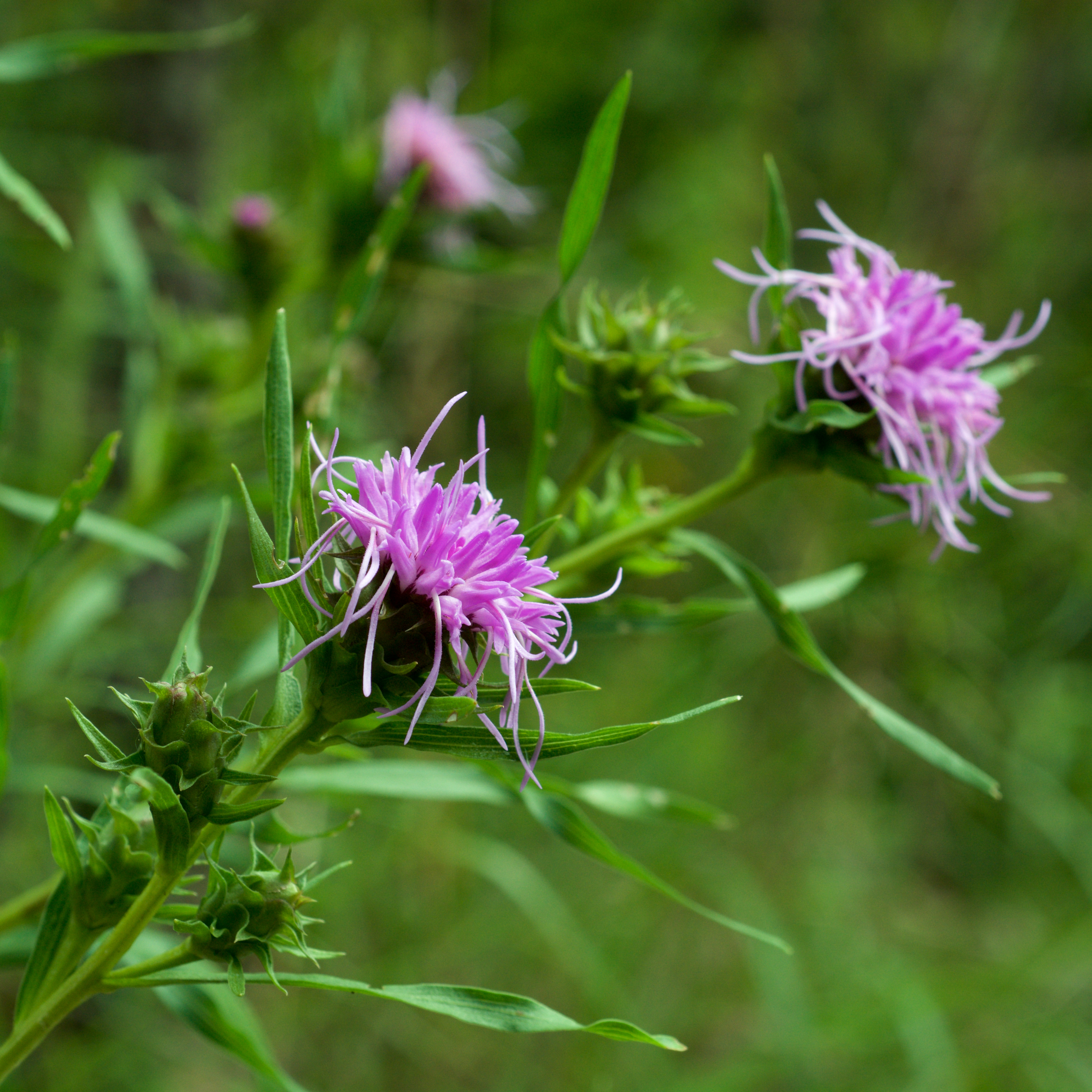

Conservation status
- Vulnerable (NatureServe)

Scientific classification
- Kingdom: Plantae
- Clade: Tracheophytes
- Clade: Angiosperms
- Clade: Eudicots
- Clade: Asterids
- Order: Asterales
- Family: Asteraceae
- Genus: Liatris
- Species: L. compacta

Binomial name
- Liatris compacta (Torrey & A.Gray) Rydb. 1931

Synonyms
- Liatris squarrosa var. compacta Torr. & A. Gray 1841

= Liatris compacta =

Species of flowering plant

Liatris compacta, sometimes called Arkansas gayfeather, is a herbaceous plant species in the family Asteraceae and genus Liatris. It is native to the Ouachitas of west-central Arkansas and eastern Oklahoma in the central United States, where it is found growing in habitats such as rocky ridges, bluffs, hillsides, weathered sandstone, and open woods. It blooms in June to September and may start blooming as early as May, it has purple flowers grouped into heads. It was known as a variety of Liatris squarrosa as Liatris squarrosa var. compacta until relatively recently.

== Description ==
Liatris compacta grows from rounded corms, that produce hairless stems 22 to 50 centimeters (8.8-20.0 inches) tall. The flowers are in heads with 18-25 flowers per head, the heads are produced singularly or in clusters of 2 to 5 heads. The heads have large leaf-like bracts under them; the stems attaching the heads to the main stem are 3 to 25 millimeters (0.12-1.00 inch) long. The heads are arranged in loose spike-like or raceme-like collections. The basal and early cauline leaves have 3 to 5 nerves and are elliptic-lanceolate in shape; the basal foliage often withers before flowering. The foliage is hairless and may have faint glandular dots; the leaves are gradually reduced in size as they ascend near the tops of the stems. The seed are produced in cypselae fruits that are 5.5 to 8 millimeters long with feathery bristles.

== Taxonomy ==
Liatris compacta appears closely related to Liatris squarrosa and has been grouped within that species in the past. It has differences in morphology and a distinctive range, it also grows in different habitats. It, along with Liatris squarrosa, Liatris hirsuta, and Liatris cylindracea are interrelated and similar in appearance; all four species having a tendency for cylindric involucres and have corolla lobes with dense hirsute hairs. Where these species inhabit the same locations, intermediates and intergraded forms exist from hybridization, making identifications arbitrary.
