= L. compacta =

L. compacta may refer to:

- Leptoxis compacta, the oblong rocksnail, an extinct freshwater snail species endemic to the United States
- Liatris compacta, the Arkansas gayfeather, a herbaceous plant species native to west-central Arkansas in the United States

== See also ==
- Compacta (disambiguation)
