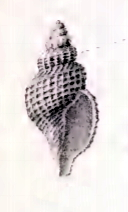
- Austrodaphnella alcestis

Scientific classification
- Kingdom: Animalia
- Phylum: Mollusca
- Class: Gastropoda
- Subclass: Caenogastropoda
- Order: Neogastropoda
- Superfamily: Conoidea
- Family: Raphitomidae
- Genus: Austrodaphnella; Laseron, 1954

Type species
- Austrodaphnella clathrata Laseron, 1954

Species
- See text

= Austrodaphnella =

Genus of gastropods

Austrodaphnella is a genus of sea snails, marine gastropod mollusks in the family Raphitomidae.

== Species ==
Species within the genus Austrodaphnella include:

- Austrodaphnella alcestis (Melvill, 1906)
- Austrodaphnella clathrata Laseron, 1954
- Austrodaphnella yemenensis Bonfitto et al., 2001

Synonyms

- Austrodaphnella torresensis Shuto, 1983: synonym of Asperdaphne torresensis (Shuto, 1983)
