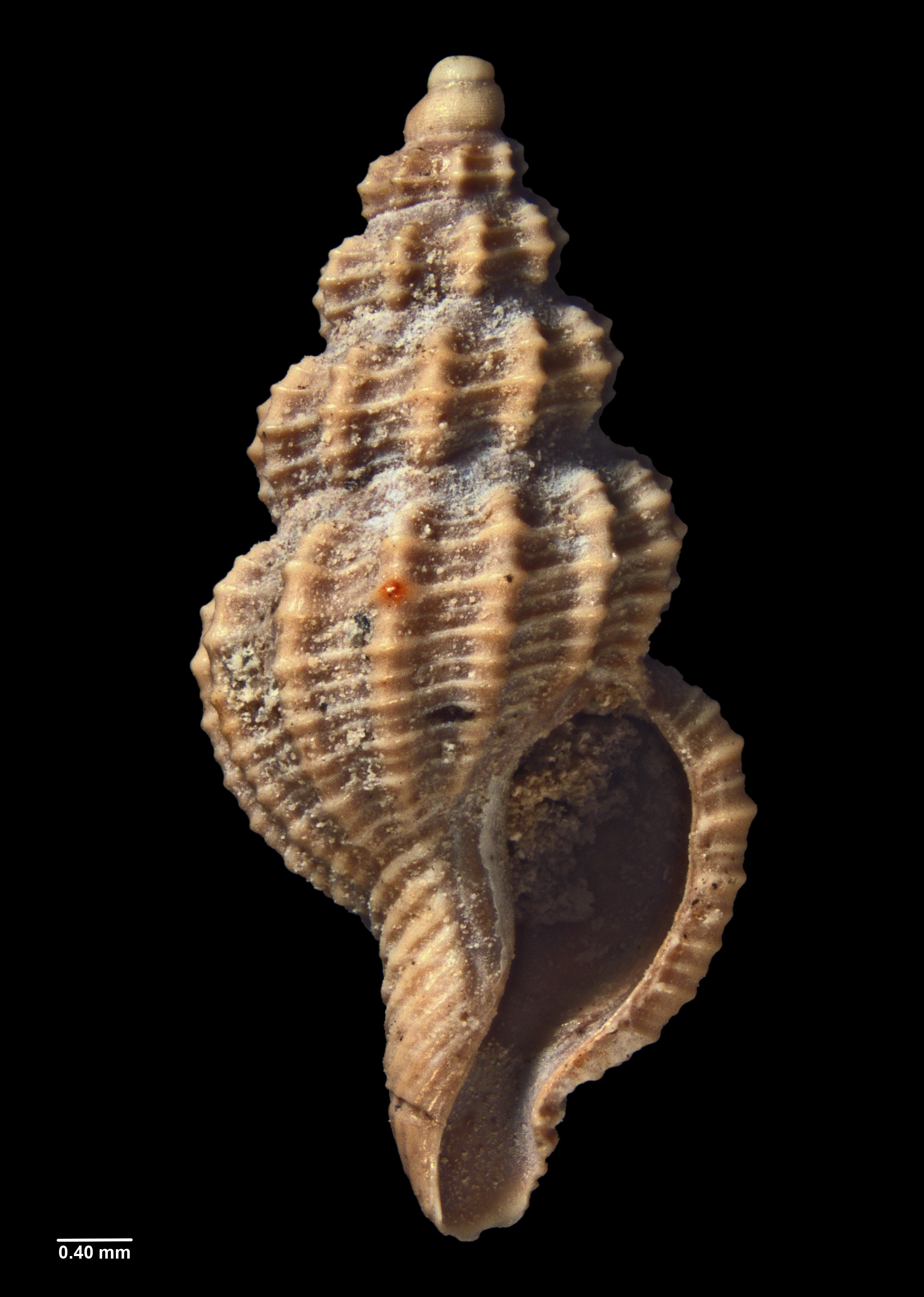
- Holotype from Auckland War Memorial Museum

Scientific classification
- Kingdom: Animalia
- Phylum: Mollusca
- Class: Gastropoda
- Subclass: Caenogastropoda
- Order: Neogastropoda
- Family: Raphitomidae
- Genus: Asperdaphne
- Species: †A. contigua

Binomial name
- †Asperdaphne contigua A. W. B. Powell, 1944

Synonyms
- †Pleurotomella contigua (A. W. B. Powell, 1944) superseded combination

= Asperdaphne contigua =

Asperdaphne contigua Temporal range: middle Miocene

Extinct species of gastropod

Asperdaphne contigua is an extinct species of sea snail, a marine gastropod mollusc, in the family Raphitomidae. Fossils of the species date to the middle Miocene strata of the Port Phillip Basin of Victoria, Australia.

== Description ==
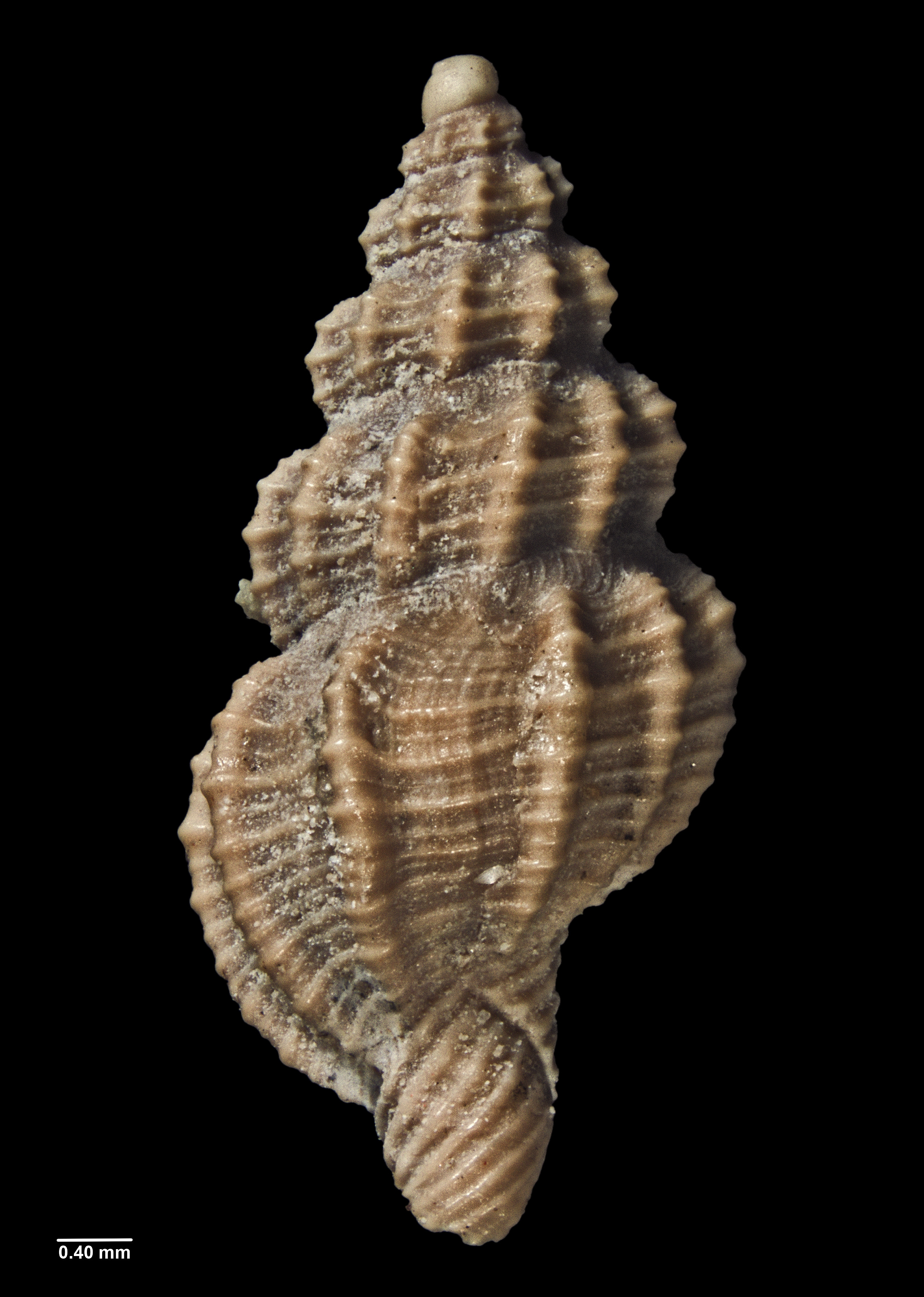
Reverse view of holotype

In the original description, Powell described the species as follows:

Broader, more squat-spired than balcombensis, with similar sculpture but fewer axials and spirals. Protoconch similar to that of above species, but more elevated, Axials 12 per whorl, curving half way over concave, smooth shoulder, which is at four-fifths whorl height. Below, the axials extend over the base to the anterior end. There are four narrow but distinct primary spiral cords on the spire-whorls, with a thread in each interspace, and two above the shoulder angle between the uppermost primary and the smooth sinus area, The anterior end bears 9 strong cords, but no axials. Other features as in balcombensis.

The holotype of the species has a height of 6.8 mm (0.27 in), and a diameter of 3 mm (0.12 in).

== Taxonomy ==
The species was first described by A. W. B. Powell in 1944. In 2011, A. G. Beu recombined the species as Pleurotomella contigua, a change not accepted by Thomas A. Darragh (2024) or the World Register of Marine Species. The holotype was collected prior to 1944 from the Altona Bay brown coal shafts, Victoria, Australia. It is held by the Auckland War Memorial Museum.

== Distribution ==
This extinct marine species occurs in middle Miocene strata of the Port Phillip Basin of Victoria, Australia, including the Gellibrand Formation.
