= Asperdaphne colubrariaoides =

Scientific classification
- Kingdom: Animalia
- Phylum: Mollusca
- Class: Gastropoda
- Subclass: Caenogastropoda
- Order: Neogastropoda
- Superfamily: Conoidea
- Family: Raphitomidae
- Genus: Asperdaphne
- Species: A. colubrariaoides

Binomial name
- Asperdaphne colubrariaoides (Stahlschmidt, Chino & E. Tardy, 2022)

Synonyms
- Pseudodaphnella colubrariaoides Stahlschmidt, Chino & E. Tardy, 2022 superseded combination

Species of gastropod

Asperdaphne colubrariaoides is a species of sea snail, a marine gastropod mollusk in the family Raphitomidae.

== Distribution ==
This marine species occurs off Papua New Guinea.
