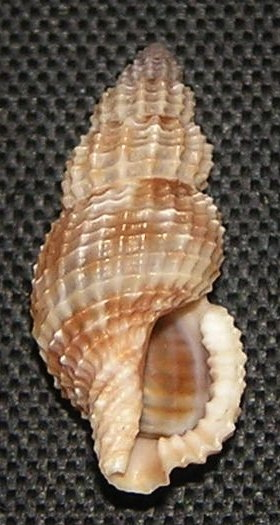
- Shell of Asperdaphne peradmirabilis

Scientific classification
- Kingdom: Animalia
- Phylum: Mollusca
- Class: Gastropoda
- Subclass: Caenogastropoda
- Order: Neogastropoda
- Superfamily: Conoidea
- Family: Raphitomidae
- Genus: Asperdaphne
- Species: A. peradmirabilis

Binomial name
- Asperdaphne peradmirabilis (E.A. Smith, 1879)

Synonyms
- Drillia peradmirabilis E.A. Smith, 1879

= Asperdaphne peradmirabilis =

Species of gastropod

Asperdaphne peradmirabilis is a species of sea snail, a marine gastropod mollusk in the family Raphitomidae.

Subspecies: Asperdaphne peradmirabilis bulbosa Shuto

== Description ==
The robustly fusiform shell is whitish or yellowish white, stained with brown beneath the suture, and obscurely banded with the same colour about the middle of the body whorl, spotted and dotted with a lighter tint irregularly over the rest of the surface, but leaving a plain white zone at the angulation of the whorls and a second just above the median brown one on the body whorl. The apex is white. The shell contains 8½ whorls of which 1½ smooth, globose whorls in the protoconch. The rest concavely slope above, then are obtusely angled about the middle, rounded, and much contracted beneath, obliquely plicated and spirally lirated. The plicae are rounded, oblique, but little elevated, more or less obsolete at the upper part. The transverse lirae are most beautifully and finely granulated. They are separated by deep-cut striae of different sizes, those in the concavity of the whorls subequal and finer than those beneath, which, again, are not all of uniform tenuity. They number about 20 on the penultimate whorl and on the body whorl as many as 55. Those around the lower part of the body whorl are pretty regularly alternately larger and small, the latter being the more granulous. The body whorl is contracted at the lower part, and is destitute of the plicae on about a third of its extent near the lip.

The aperture together with the siphonal canal are a little less than half the length of the shell. The aperture is brownish within, with a single white central zone, and a white patch parallel with the margins of the outer lip, corresponding to a stout exterior submarginal varix, and stained with dark brown between this and the thin prettily crenulated edge of the outer lip. The outer lip is curved and very shallowly sinuated towards the base, and finely sulcated within, but at the edges. The sinus is deep, at the suture. The columella is a little oblique and tortuous, whitish, without markings or callosity, only furnished with a small whitish tripartite tubercle at the upper part, just a little below the sinus, and connected with the suture by a thin callus. The length of the shell varies between 15 mm and 25 mm.

== Distribution ==
This marine species occurs off the Philippines, Japan and Korea.
