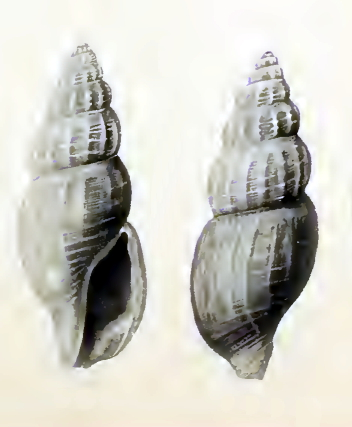
- Original image of a shell of Asperdaphne suluensis

Scientific classification
- Kingdom: Animalia
- Phylum: Mollusca
- Class: Gastropoda
- Subclass: Caenogastropoda
- Order: Neogastropoda
- Superfamily: Conoidea
- Family: Raphitomidae
- Genus: Asperdaphne
- Species: A. suluensis

Binomial name
- Asperdaphne suluensis (Schepman, 1913)

Synonyms
- Daphnella suluensis Schepman, 1913

= Asperdaphne suluensis =

Species of gastropod

Asperdaphne suluensis is a species of sea snail, a marine gastropod mollusk in the family Raphitomidae.

== Description ==
The length of the shell attains 16¼ mm, its diameter 6¼ mm.

(Original description) The solid, elongately oval shell has a short siphonal canal. It is yellowish-white but brownish behind the peristome. The protoconch is wanting. The 7 remaining whorls are convex, separated by a deep, undulated suture. The sculpture consists of remote, rounded, axial ribs, more conspicuous on the upper whorls, nearly disappearing on the body whorl. There are eighteen on the penultimate whorl and conspicuous growth lines on the ribs and the interstices. The whole shell is crossed by unequal spirals, of which about 5 on the penultimate one are more prominent. The aperture is subquadrangularly oval, with a blunt angle above and a short, wide siphonal canal below. The peristome is moderately thin, undulated, with a shallow sinus just below the suture, angular at the entrance of the siphonal canal. The columellar margin is nearly straight in its lower part. The interior of the aperture is light brownish, with a bluish tint in the depth.

== Distribution ==
This marine species occurs off the Philippines and in the Sulu Sea and off Brunei.
