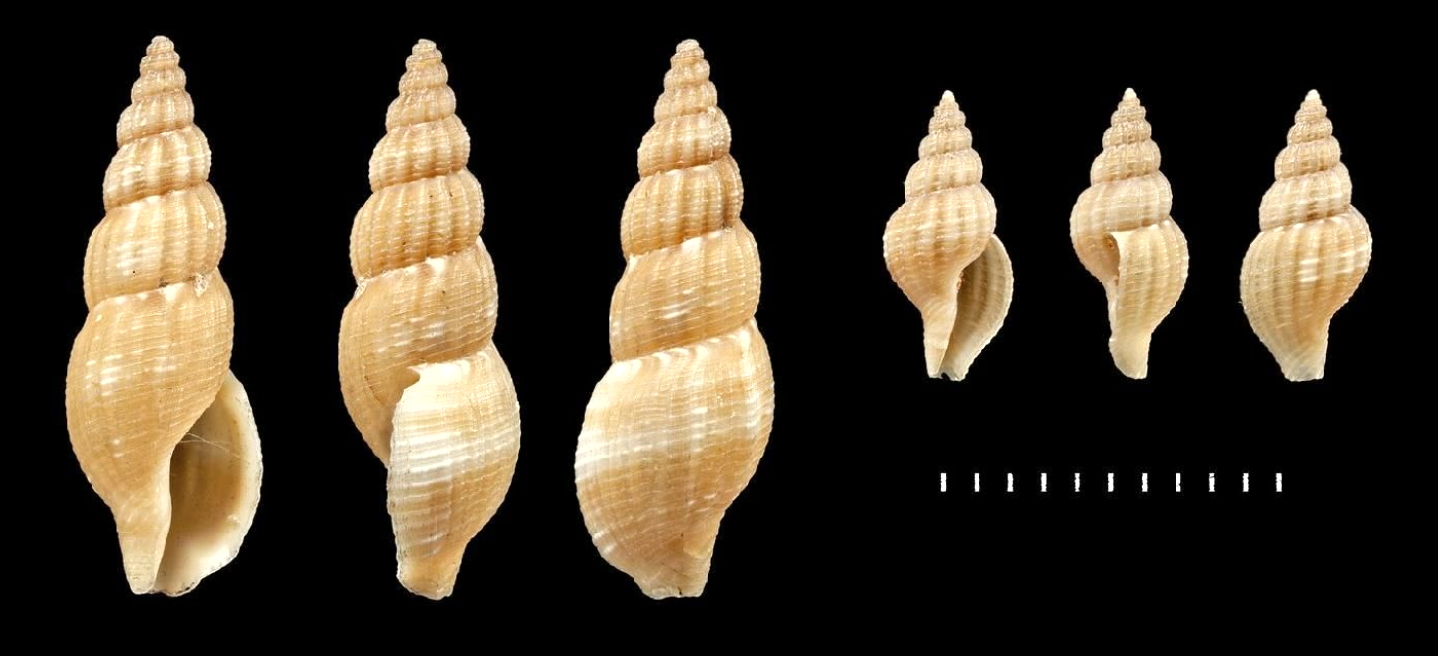
- Shell of Asperdaphne subzonata (syntype at the Natural History Museum, London)

Scientific classification
- Kingdom: Animalia
- Phylum: Mollusca
- Class: Gastropoda
- Subclass: Caenogastropoda
- Order: Neogastropoda
- Superfamily: Conoidea
- Family: Raphitomidae
- Genus: Asperdaphne
- Species: A. subzonata

Binomial name
- Asperdaphne subzonata (E.A. Smith, 1879)

Synonyms
- Daphnella subzonata E.A. Smith, 1879

= Asperdaphne subzonata =

Species of gastropod

Asperdaphne subzonata is a species of sea snail, a marine gastropod mollusk in the family Raphitomidae.

== Description ==
The length of the shell varies between 15 mm and 20 mm.

(Original description) The elongate shell is dull lightish brown, more or less distinctly banded at the middle of the whorls, with opaque white lines interrupted by dark brown dots or short lines. Sometimes the shell is marked with opaque white streaks just beneath the suture, and with a second less apparent transverse band around the lower part of the body whorl. The shell contains 11 whorls. The whorls in the protoconch are minutely reticulated. The rest are convex, divided by an oblique suture, longitudinally costate, and transversely closely lirate. The ribs are rounded, a little oblique, 16 on the penultimate, and fewer on the preceding whorls. The spiral lirae are equally elevated on and between the ribs, about 12 on the penultimate, and, like the ribs, gradually fewer on the upper whorls. The entire surface is microscopically reticulated. The aperture is rather broad, somewhat of the same colour as the exterior, but a little clouded. The outer lip is arcuate, moderately thickened, with a small sinus at the suture, smooth within. The columella is suberect, a little oblique at the lower end, smooth. The siphonal canal is rather wide, short, but very little recurved.

== Distribution ==
This marine species occurs off the Philippines and Japan.
