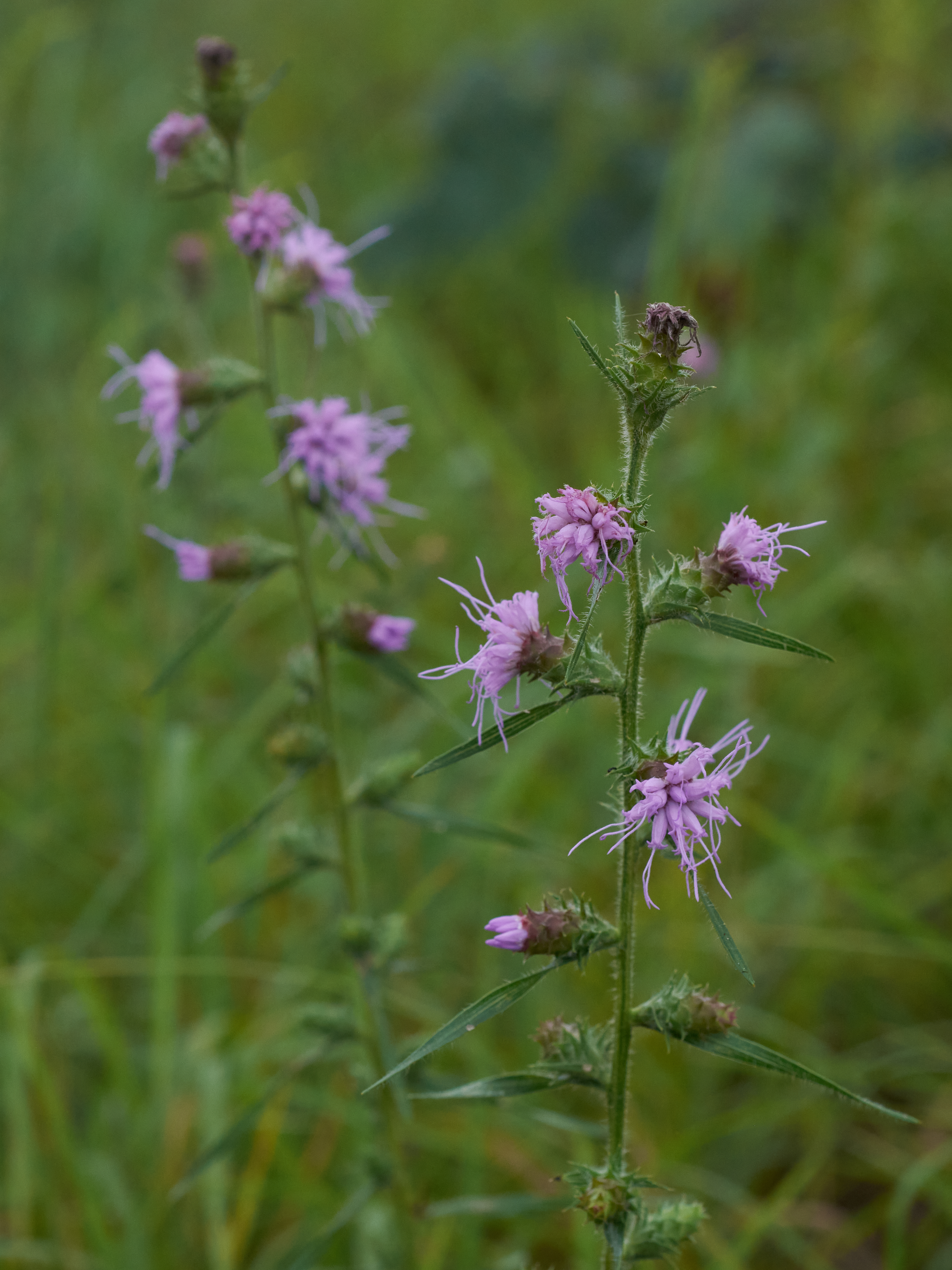

Conservation status
- Apparently Secure (NatureServe)

Scientific classification
- Kingdom: Plantae
- Clade: Tracheophytes
- Clade: Angiosperms
- Clade: Eudicots
- Clade: Asterids
- Order: Asterales
- Family: Asteraceae
- Genus: Liatris
- Species: L. hirsuta

Binomial name
- Liatris hirsuta Rydberg

= Liatris hirsuta =

Species of flowering plant

Liatris hirsuta, commonly called hairy gayfeather, is a species of flowering plant in the family Asteraceae. It is native to North America, where it is found primarily in the Midwestern and South-Central regions of the United States. Its typical natural habitat is glades, rocky bluffs, and upland prairies.

Liatris hirsuta is similar to Liatris squarrosa, and some authors classify it with varietal status (Liatris squarrosa var. hirsuta). Liatris hirsuta is typically found to the west of the range over Liatris squarrosa, but there are regions of co-occurrence. Liatris hirsuta can be distinguished from Liatris squarrosa by its short-tapering involucral bracts, and its comparatively straighter and more spreading hairs. Liatris squarrosa is also close to Liatris cylindracea, with which it has been found to intergrade.

== Description ==
Liatris hirsuta is an erect perennial. It produces purple-pink flowers in the summer, from June to September. Individuals may reach up to 1 meter (approximately 3 feet) in height, and possess leaves that are 3.5 decimeters (approximately 14 inches) in length and ranging from 0.5 to 1.5 centimeters (0.2 to 0.6 inches) in length.
