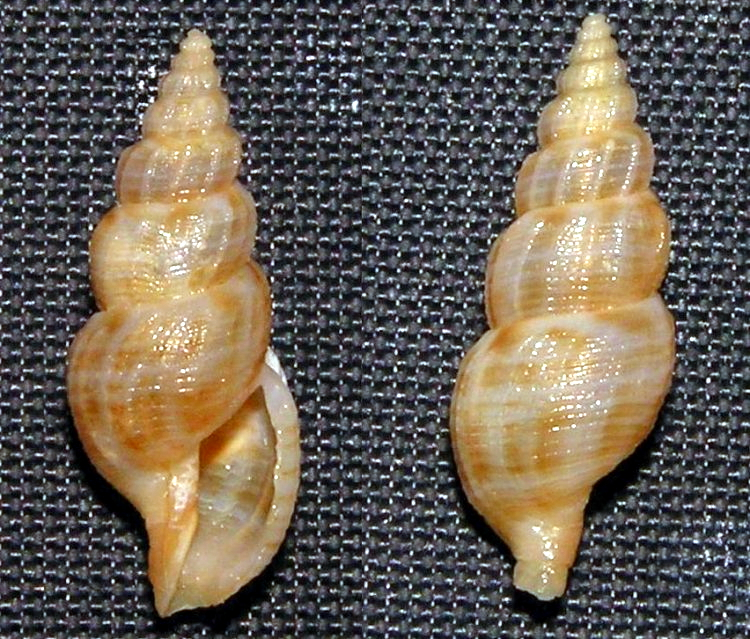
- Shell of Asperdaphne elegantissima

Scientific classification
- Kingdom: Animalia
- Phylum: Mollusca
- Class: Gastropoda
- Subclass: Caenogastropoda
- Order: Neogastropoda
- Superfamily: Conoidea
- Family: Raphitomidae
- Genus: Asperdaphne
- Species: A. elegantissima

Binomial name
- Asperdaphne elegantissima (Schepman, 1913)

Synonyms
- Daphnella elegantissima Schepman, 1913

= Asperdaphne elegantissima =

Species of gastropod

Asperdaphne elegantissima is a species of sea snail, a marine gastropod mollusk in the family Raphitomidae.

== Description ==
The length of the shell varies between 8 mm and 26 mm.

(Original description) The ovately-fusiform shell has a sharp spire and a short siphonal canal. It is moderately strong, yellowish, with a faint red-brown band at the base of the body whorl. The shell contains 9 whorls, of which about 1 1/2 form a protoconch with obscure sculpture. The subsequent whorls are convex, separated by a linear suture, with a slight excavation below it. The sculpture consists of remote, rounded ribs, 10 in number on penultimate whorl, stronger on the upper ones, and numerous, raised, axial striae, as well on the ribs as in the interstices. This sculpture is crossed by numerous spiral lirae, which are fainter in the excavation and of which some, (4 on penultimate whorl) are stronger. In crossing the ribs these stronger lirae produce tubercles, strongest on upper whorls, nearly disappearing on the body whorl. By this sculpture the whole shell has a coarse cancellation, with a finer intermediate one. The aperture is subquadrangular, with a rather narrow sinus, comparatively deep for the genus. The peristome is but slightly convex above, suddenly roundly contracted below, forming an angle with the sip^honal canal, which is short and wide. The columellar margin is concave at its upper part, then nearly straight with a thin layer of enamel. The interior of the aperture is smooth, its margin with short grooves, corresponding to the lirae. The base of the interior and the interior of the siphonal canal are faintly red-brown.

== Distribution ==
This marine species occurs off the Philippines and in the Flores Sea.
