= Asperdaphne sculptilis =

- Original image of a shell of Asperdaphne sculptilis

Scientific classification
- Kingdom: Animalia
- Phylum: Mollusca
- Class: Gastropoda
- Subclass: Caenogastropoda
- Order: Neogastropoda
- Superfamily: Conoidea
- Family: Raphitomidae
- Genus: Asperdaphne
- Species: A. sculptilis

Binomial name
- Asperdaphne sculptilis (Angas, 1871)

Synonyms
- Asperdaphne angasi Hedley, 1903; Daphnella sculptilis Gatliff and Gabriel, 1908; Clathurella sculptilis Angas, 1871

Species of gastropod

Asperdaphne sculptilis is a species of sea snail, a marine gastropod mollusk in the family Raphitomidae.

== Description ==
(Original description) The shell is fusiformly turreted, moderately solid, pale brown. It contains 7 whorls, rounded, a little excavated next the sutures. They are longitudinally rather strongly costate, with about nine rounded ribs, between which are numerous fine erect longitudinal striae,. These become crescent- shaped on the flattened area below the sutures, and encircled with numerous concentric, somewhat irregular ridges, which are slightly nodulous at the intersections. The aperture is subpyriform. The outer lip is thin, sharp, variced externally, slightly sulcate within. The columella is straight. The siphonal canal is slightly produced and everted. The posterior sinus is rather deep.

== Distribution ==
This marine species is endemic to Australia and occurs off New South Wales, Tasmania and Victoria.
