= Asperdaphne ula =

Scientific classification
- Kingdom: Animalia
- Phylum: Mollusca
- Class: Gastropoda
- Subclass: Caenogastropoda
- Order: Neogastropoda
- Superfamily: Conoidea
- Family: Raphitomidae
- Genus: Asperdaphne
- Species: A. ula

Binomial name
- Asperdaphne ula (Watson, 1881)

Synonyms
- Pleurotoma (Drillia) ula Watson, 1881; Propebela ula (R. B. Watson, 1881)

Species of gastropod

Asperdaphne ula is a species of sea snail, a marine gastropod mollusk in the family Raphitomidae.

Robert Boog Watson wrote the species description in 1881. The specific name ula name comes from the Greek word οὖλος 'crisp'. Its type locality is north east of New Zealand at 37°34′S 179°22′E at a depth of 700 fathoms (4,200 ft; 1,300 m).

== Description ==
The length of the shell attains 6 mm, its diameter 3 mm.

(Original description) The shell is rather short, fusiform, biconical, scalar and angulated. It is obsoletely ribbed, with rather strong spiral threads. The snout is rather short, broadish, and lopsided. There are on the body whorl about 18, very oblique, curved, narrow, rather obsolete, irregularly arranged riblets parted by wider shallow furrows. They originate faintly at the suture, are strongest and somewhat mucronate at the angulation, extend to the lower suture, and appear on the base, but not on the aperture. They are much stronger on the earlier whorls than on the last one. There are very many fine hairlike lines of growth. There are a great many remote hairlike spiral threads. On the shoulder below the suture these are fine and closer-set than on the body and base. The carinal one at the angulation and that next below this, especially the first, are strong. They are ornamented with close-set, round, minute granules, which swell into small prominent tubercles in crossing the riblets. Those on the carinal spiral in particular are high, sharp, and horizontally elongated. In the interstices of the ribs and spirals the whole surface is microscopically granulated. It is this granulated surface which gives the peculiar crisp aspect to the texture of the shell, from which its name is taken. The colour is semitransparent flinty, white, with a crisp or slightly frosted aspect. The spire is scalar, rather stumpily conical, with its profile-lines much interrupted by the constriction of the sutures. The protoconch consists of two globose embryonic whorls, of which the first is immersed, but scarcely flattened down on one side. They are rather remotely microscopically regularly striated. The shell contains 5 1/2 whorls. They are short, broad, of slow increase, with a rather long sloping shoulder and a sharp carinated angle, below which they are cylindrical, with a very slight contraction to the suture. The body whorl is broadest at the keel, and from this point convexly contracted to the rather short, broadish, conical snout. The suture is linear, but well marked by the contraction of the whorls. The aperture is rather large, rhomboidally pear-shaped, with three angles above, and. prolonged below into a wide open siphonal canal. The outer lip is thin, angulated, rectilinear above to the keel, flatly curved below. On leaving the body it at once retreats to the left, forming in the shoulder a shallow, open, rounded sinus. Below the angle it advances very little. And at the snout its retreat is small. The inner lip shows a thin narrow glaze on the body and columella. At the base of the columella is a slight rounded angle. The columella is short, conical, and straight. Its point is very slightly truncate, with a narrow, rounded, but scarcely twisted edge.

== Distribution ==
This marine species is endemic to New Zealand and occurs at Eastern North Island and eastern South Island at depths between 549 m and 1280 m.
