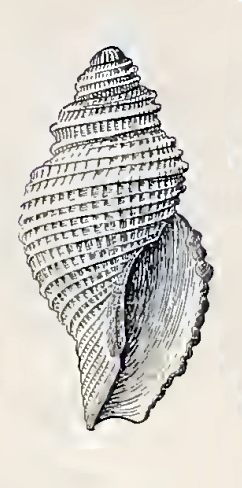
- Shell of Asperdaphne tasmanica

Scientific classification
- Kingdom: Animalia
- Phylum: Mollusca
- Class: Gastropoda
- Subclass: Caenogastropoda
- Order: Neogastropoda
- Superfamily: Conoidea
- Family: Raphitomidae
- Genus: Asperdaphne
- Species: A. tasmanica

Binomial name
- Asperdaphne tasmanica (Tenison-Woods, 1877)

Synonyms
- Daphnella tasmanica Tenison-Woods, 1877

= Asperdaphne tasmanica =

Species of gastropod

Asperdaphne tasmanica is a species of sea snail, a marine gastropod mollusk in the family Raphitomidae.

== Description ==
The length of the shell attains 7 mm, its diameter 3 mm.

(Original description) The small shell is tumidly ovate. It is whitish, thin opaque. It contains 6 whorls, convex, subangulate, neatly keeled. The keels are small, rounded, elevated; It is elegantly cancellate, with regular distant small lirae. The keels in the body whorl alternate. The sutured is deeply impressed. The apex is obtuse and cancellate. The aperture is widely ovate. The outer lip is thin and deeply sinuated posteriorly. The lip is inconspicuous. The columella is long and twisted. The siphonal canal is somewhat short.

== Distribution ==
This marine species is endemic to Australia and occurs off South Australia, Tasmania and Victoria.
