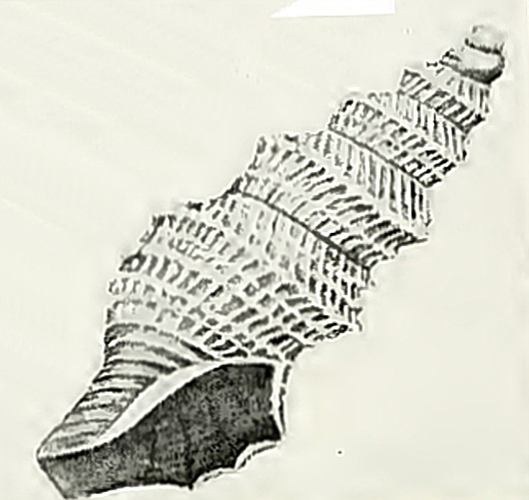
- Original image of a shell of Asperdaphne esperanza

Scientific classification
- Kingdom: Animalia
- Phylum: Mollusca
- Class: Gastropoda
- Subclass: Caenogastropoda
- Order: Neogastropoda
- Superfamily: Conoidea
- Family: Raphitomidae
- Genus: Asperdaphne
- Species: A. esperanza

Binomial name
- Asperdaphne esperanza (May, 1911)

Synonyms
- Hemipleurotoma esperanza May, 1911

= Asperdaphne esperanza =

Species of gastropod

Asperdaphne esperanza is a species of sea snail, a marine gastropod mollusk in the family Raphitomidae.

== Description ==
The length of the shell attains 5.3 mm, its diameter 2 mm.

(Original description) The dull white shell is high, attenuate anteriorly. It contains six whorls, strongly angular, and including a smooth blunt two-whorled protoconch. A strong keel angles the periphery, another less strong halfway to the lower suture, and a third margins the suture. On the upper slope are two or more faint spirals. Numerous axial lirae cancellate the shell and pass over the keels, rendering them nodulous. They disappear on the lower part of the body whorl, which is occupied by about eight smooth spirals. The aperture is subquadrate, contracted in front to form a short open siphonal canal. The outer lip is strongly angled at the carena, forming a wide, triangular sinus; below corrugated by the sculpture. The inner lip is curved.

== Distribution ==
This marine species is endemic to Australia and occurs off Tasmania.
