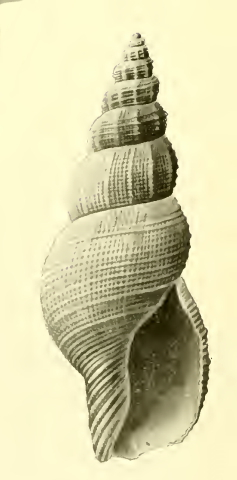
- Original image of a shell of Asperdaphne versivestita

Scientific classification
- Kingdom: Animalia
- Phylum: Mollusca
- Class: Gastropoda
- Subclass: Caenogastropoda
- Order: Neogastropoda
- Superfamily: Conoidea
- Family: Raphitomidae
- Genus: Asperdaphne
- Species: A. versivestita

Binomial name
- Asperdaphne versivestita (Hedley, 1912)

Synonyms
- Daphnella versivestita Hedley, 1912

= Asperdaphne versivestita =

Species of gastropod

Asperdaphne versivestita is a species of sea snail, a marine gastropod mollusk in the family Raphitomidae.

== Description ==
The shell attains a length of 25 mm, its diameter 9 mm.

(Original description) The large, rather thin shell is elongate conic. The earlier whorls are angled, the last rounded. The colour of the shell is cream with a few irregularly scattered pale brown spots. It contains 9 whorls, including a two-whorled protoconch. The minute turbinate protoconch is finely spirally grooved. In contrast to this the first adult whorl appears with a broad shoulder, beneath which are two conspicuous keels. Fresh spirals arise by intercalation on the subsequent whorls, till alternately larger and smaller, they amount to sixteen on the penultimate. Behind the aperture are about twenty-eight spiral cords of various sizes, sometimes with minor threads in their interstices. On the second mature whorl, nine prominent radial ribs arise, undulating the keels. After increasing to eleven and maintaining their relative prominence for several whorls, the ribs commence to fade on the antepenultimate, they disappear from the body whorl. About the penultimate and body whorl, equal radials and spirals produce by intersection an evenly beaded surface. The anal fasciole occupies a shelf on the summit of the whorl and is sculptured by crescentic threads. The aperture is ovate. The outer lip is dentate from the revolving sculpture. The inner lip shows a thin callus, at the posterior angle a slight sinus. The siphonal canal is short and broad.

== Distribution ==
This marine species is endemic to Australia and occurs off New South Wales
