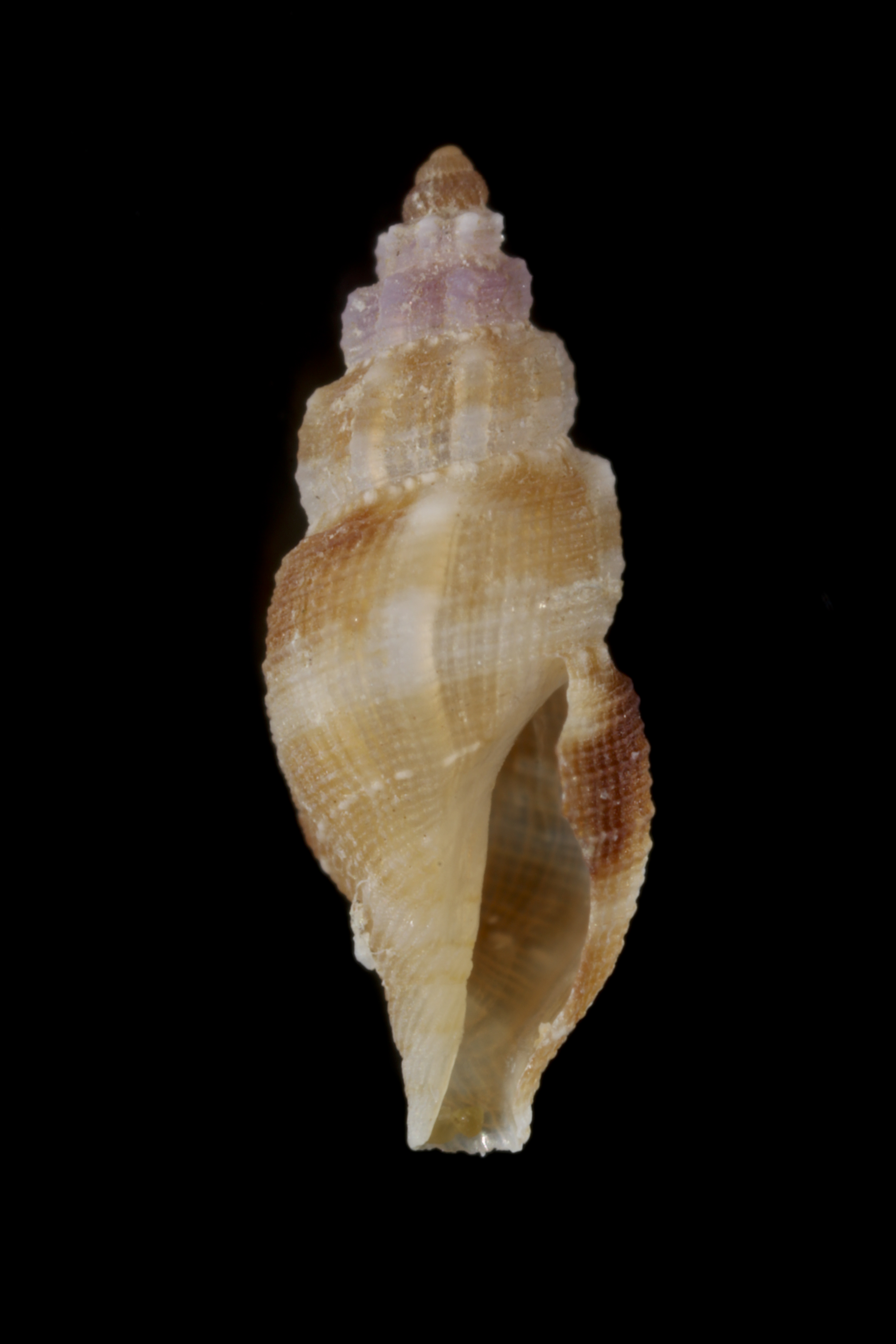
- Shell of Asperdaphne subrissoides (specimen at MNHN, Paris)

Scientific classification
- Kingdom: Animalia
- Phylum: Mollusca
- Class: Gastropoda
- Subclass: Caenogastropoda
- Order: Neogastropoda
- Family: Raphitomidae
- Genus: Asperdaphne
- Species: A. subrissoides

Binomial name
- Asperdaphne subrissoides (Hervier, 1897)

Synonyms
- Daphnella varicosa var. subrissoides Hervier, 1897; Tritonoturris subrissoides (Hervier, 1897) superseded combination

= Asperdaphne subrissoides =

Species of gastropod

Asperdaphne subrissoides is a species of sea snail, a marine gastropod mollusk in the family Raphitomidae.

== Description ==
The length of the shell varies between 7 mm and 15 mm.

(Original description in Latin) The shell has a reddish apex and is painted alternately with tawny and white coloration along the sutures. It is cloudily streaked with a hawk-tawny hue, and features irregular varices. While its sculptural details perfectly match the archetype described by the original author, its color—though not its sculpture—bears some resemblance to the described variety.

== Distribution ==
This marine species occurs off the Philippines, Hawaii, Papua New Guinea and New Caledonia.
