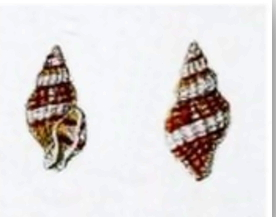
- Apispiralia albocincta

Scientific classification
- Kingdom: Animalia
- Phylum: Mollusca
- Class: Gastropoda
- Subclass: Caenogastropoda
- Order: Neogastropoda
- Superfamily: Conoidea
- Family: Mangeliidae
- Genus: Apispiralia; Powell, 1942

Type species
- Clathurella albocincta Angas, 1871

Species
- See text

= Apispiralia =

Genus of gastropods

Apispiralia is a genus of sea snails, marine gastropod mollusks in the family Mangeliidae.

== Species ==
Species within the genus Apispiralia include:

- Apispiralia albocincta (Angas, 1871)
- Apispiralia catena Laseron, 1954
- Apispiralia maxima Laseron, 1954
