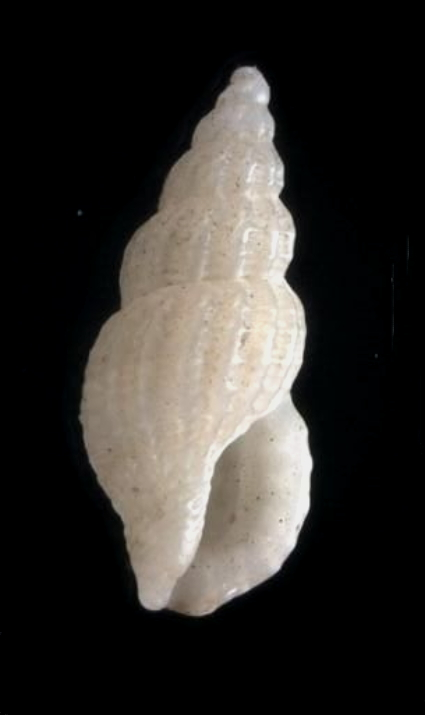
- Shell of Asperdaphne desalesii (holotype at Museums Victoria)

Scientific classification
- Kingdom: Animalia
- Phylum: Mollusca
- Class: Gastropoda
- Subclass: Caenogastropoda
- Order: Neogastropoda
- Superfamily: Conoidea
- Family: Raphitomidae
- Genus: Asperdaphne
- Species: A. desalesii

Binomial name
- Asperdaphne desalesii (Tenison-Woods, 1877)

Synonyms
- Asperdaphne sculptilior Tenison-Woods, 1879; Asperdaphne sexdentata Pritchard & Gatliff, 1899; Clathurella desalesi Tate and May, 1901; Clathurella sculptior Tenison-Woods, 1878; Clathurella sexdentata Pritchard and Gatliff, 1900; Daphnella desalesii Tenison-Woods, 1877; Mangelia desalesii Tenison-Woods, 1876; Scabrella desalesii May, 1921

= Asperdaphne desalesii =

Species of gastropod

Asperdaphne desalesii is a species of sea snail, a marine gastropod mollusk in the family Raphitomidae.

== Description ==
The length of the shell varies between 5 mm and 8 mm.

(Original description) The small, solid, turreted shell is elongately fusiform. It is whitish, pale yellow. It is irregularly zoned, with white and fulvous. It contains 7 whorls, including the protoconch. These are convex, elegantly thickly obliquely ribbed, and thickly spirally lirate. The body whorl contains 14 rounded, slightly raised ribs. The lirae are small, distant, slightly raised, regular, passing over the ribs The apex of two whorls is smooth and elongate. The suture is deep. The ovate aperture measures a third the length of shell. The outer lip is thickened and conspicuously dentate within. The sinus is broad, conspicuous, posterior. The siphonal canal is somewhat long. The columella is inconspicuous, a more intense fulvous behind, and thickly obliquely lirate.

== Distribution ==
This marine species is endemic to Australia and occurs off South Australia, Tasmania and Victoria.
