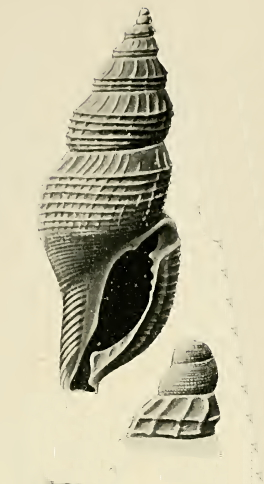
- Original image of a shell of Asperdaphne perissa

Scientific classification
- Kingdom: Animalia
- Phylum: Mollusca
- Class: Gastropoda
- Subclass: Caenogastropoda
- Order: Neogastropoda
- Superfamily: Conoidea
- Family: Raphitomidae
- Genus: Asperdaphne
- Species: A. perissa

Binomial name
- Asperdaphne perissa (Hedley, 1909)

Synonyms
- Mangelia perissa Hedley, 1909

= Asperdaphne perissa =

Species of gastropod

Asperdaphne perissa is a species of sea snail, a marine gastropod mollusk in the family Raphitomidae.

== Description ==
The length of the shell attains 7.4 mm, its diameter 2.9 mm.

(Original description) The thin shell is ovate-fusiform and has an acuminate spire. it contains five whorls of which two in the protoconch, the latter subulate with spiral punctate grooves. The colour of the shell is dead white except a cinnamon protoconch. The sculpture shows spiral threads predominating, amounting on the body whorl to about thirty, not impinging on a broad anal fasciole, beneath this strong and widely spaced, becoming feebler and closer below the periphery, but waxing stronger on the back of the siphonal canal. The penultimate carries six such spirals, then three, then two on the earlier whorls. The radials are stronger on the younger whorls, but decrease on the older. In the body whorl they fade away about the periphery, and in the penultimate scarcely reach across the whorl. In every case they are overridden by the spirals. The aperture is elliptical. The inner lip is overlaid by a substantial callus which, opposite the sulcus and at the base of the siphonal canal, is provided by a small but sharp tubercle. The outer lip is produced externally into a prominent varix, and beset within by a row of small tubercles. The siphonal canal is short and broad.

== Distribution ==
This marine species is endemic to Australia and occurs off Queensland.
