= Asperdaphne kailuensis =

Scientific classification
- Kingdom: Animalia
- Phylum: Mollusca
- Class: Gastropoda
- Subclass: Caenogastropoda
- Order: Neogastropoda
- Superfamily: Conoidea
- Family: Raphitomidae
- Genus: Asperdaphne
- Species: A. kailuensis

Binomial name
- Asperdaphne kailuensis Wiedrick, 2025

Species of gastropod

Asperdaphne kailuensis is a species of sea snail, a marine gastropod mollusk in the family Raphitomidae.

== Distribution ==
This marine species occurs off Hawaii.
