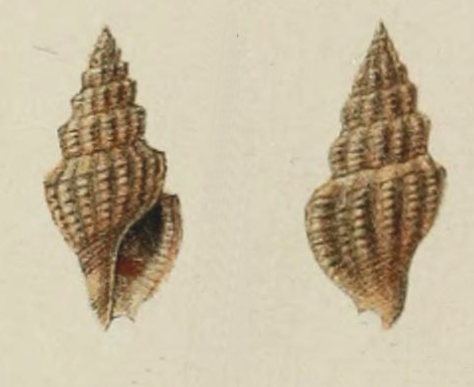
- Drawing of a shell of Asperdaphne walcotae (holotype)

Scientific classification
- Kingdom: Animalia
- Phylum: Mollusca
- Class: Gastropoda
- Subclass: Caenogastropoda
- Order: Neogastropoda
- Superfamily: Conoidea
- Family: Raphitomidae
- Genus: Asperdaphne
- Species: A. walcotae

Binomial name
- Asperdaphne walcotae (G.B. Sowerby III, 1893)

Synonyms
- Clathurella walcotae (Sowerby III, 1893).; Drillia walcotae Sowerby III, 1893; Pleurotoma walcotae Sowerby III, 1893

= Asperdaphne walcotae =

Species of gastropod

Asperdaphne walcotae is a species of sea snail, a marine gastropod mollusk in the family Raphitomidae.

Subspecies: Asperdaphne walcotae pallida Sowerby III, 1896

== Description ==
The length of the shell attains 20 mm, its diameter 10 mm.

(Original description in Latin) The turreted shell is relatively short, rough, and pale. It is marked anteriorly by a pale purple band. The spire itself is turreted, sharp, and graduated The suture is inconspicuous. It consists of eight whorls that are spirally striated throughout. Each whorl is angled above its middle, convex below the angle, and features longitudinal ribs (approximately 12 on the body whorl). It is also marked by spiral ridges (four on the penultimate whorl). The body whorl is nearly equal in height to the spire. It is slightly convex below the angle, and contracts towards the base, terminating in a short beak. The aperture is rather wide and has a purple-gray throat. The siphonal canal is very short and slightly curved backward. The columella is relatively straight, and the outer lip is sharp and finely crenulated, featuring a deep, fairly wide sinus at the top.

== Distribution ==
This marine species is endemic to Australia and occurs in the waters off the coast of South Australia.
