= Asperdaphne moretonica =

Scientific classification
- Kingdom: Animalia
- Phylum: Mollusca
- Class: Gastropoda
- Subclass: Caenogastropoda
- Order: Neogastropoda
- Superfamily: Conoidea
- Family: Raphitomidae
- Genus: Asperdaphne
- Species: A. moretonica

Binomial name
- Asperdaphne moretonica (E.A. Smith, 1882)

Synonyms
- Clathurella moretonica (Smith, 1882); Pleurotoma (Defrancia) moretonica E.A. Smith, 1882

Species of gastropod

Asperdaphne moretonica is a species of sea snail, a marine gastropod mollusk in the family Raphitomidae.

== Description ==
The length of the shell attains 11 mm, its diameter 3.5 mm.

The ovate-fusiform shell contains nine whorls, of which two smooth and polished whorls in the protoconch. The third whorl has a fine reticulation. The other whorls slope down in their upper part in a tabulate manner; the inferior part is very flat. The axial sculpture consists of 22-24 narrow ribs. The spiral sculpture consists of three main lirae and smaller ones in-between (in the body whorl about 25). The spiral lirations are slightly nodulous on crossing the ribs. The narrow aperture measures about half the total length of the shell. The outer lip is incrassate and has a crenulated margin. Its upper part is moderately sinuate. The siphonal canal is short and narrow.

The uniform brown colour and the fine reticulation are the chief characteristics.

== Distribution ==
This marine species is endemic to Australia and occurs off Queensland.
