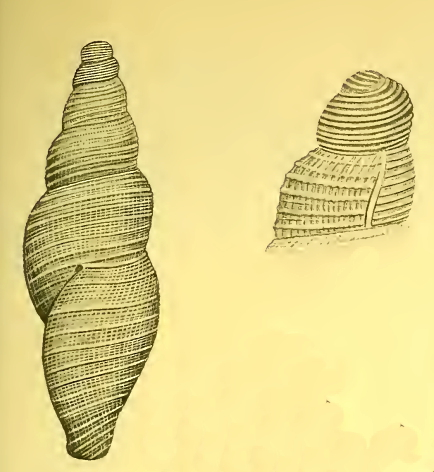
- Original image of a shell of Asperdaphne perplexa

Scientific classification
- Kingdom: Animalia
- Phylum: Mollusca
- Class: Gastropoda
- Subclass: Caenogastropoda
- Order: Neogastropoda
- Superfamily: Conoidea
- Family: Raphitomidae
- Genus: Asperdaphne
- Species: A. perplexa

Binomial name
- Asperdaphne perplexa (Verco, 1909)

Synonyms
- Daphnella perplexa Verco, 1909

= Asperdaphne perplexa =

Species of gastropod

Asperdaphne perplexa is a species of sea snail, a marine gastropod mollusk in the family Raphitomidae.

== Description ==
The length of the shell attains 6.3 mm, its diameter 2.2 mm.

(Original description) The delicate shell is elongate-oval and contains 6 whorls. The protoconch consists of two convex whorls, each with ten valid spiral lirae. The apex is blunt, ending abruptly, with the first spire-whorl issuing from within it. There are four spire-whorls, convex, with linear sutures. The body whorl is much longer than the spire, gradually contracting at the base. The aperture is oblique and is elongate-oval. The siphonal canal is short, wide, open, deviated slightly to the left. The columella is straight, forming an obtuse angle with the inner lip, which is distinct, complete, applied, and glazed. The outer lip has a finely crenulated border. In profile retrocurrent at the suture to form a shallow sinus, then uniformly curved, convex, with a shallow excavation at the contracted base. The whole surface of the shell is sculptured with spiral lirae, six in the first whorl, twelve in the second, sixteen in the third, and fifty-two in the body whorl, granulated by very fine axial striae which granulate the sutural margin. The colour is somewhat mottled very light-brown, with spiral equidistant white hairlines, five in the penultimate, ten in the body whorl.
