= Asperdaphne legrandi =

Scientific classification
- Kingdom: Animalia
- Phylum: Mollusca
- Class: Gastropoda
- Subclass: Caenogastropoda
- Order: Neogastropoda
- Superfamily: Conoidea
- Family: Raphitomidae
- Genus: Asperdaphne
- Species: A. legrandi

Binomial name
- Asperdaphne legrandi (Beddome, 1883)

Synonyms
- Asperdaphne (Aspertilla) legrandi (Beddome, 1883); Clathurella legrandi (Beddome, 1883); Daphnella legrandi (Beddome, 1883); Drillia legrandi Beddome, 1883

Species of gastropod

Asperdaphne legrandi is a species of sea snail, a marine gastropod mollusk in the family Raphitomidae.

== Description ==
The length of the shell attains 7 mm, its diameter 3.5 mm.

(Original description) The broad shell is turreted. The raised ribs are rounded. The striate interstices show fine lines which pass over the ribs. The shell contains five swollen whorls. The sinus is deep. The outer lip is varicose. The aperture is oval.

== Distribution ==
This marine species is endemic to Australia and occurs off South Australia, Tasmania and Victoria.
