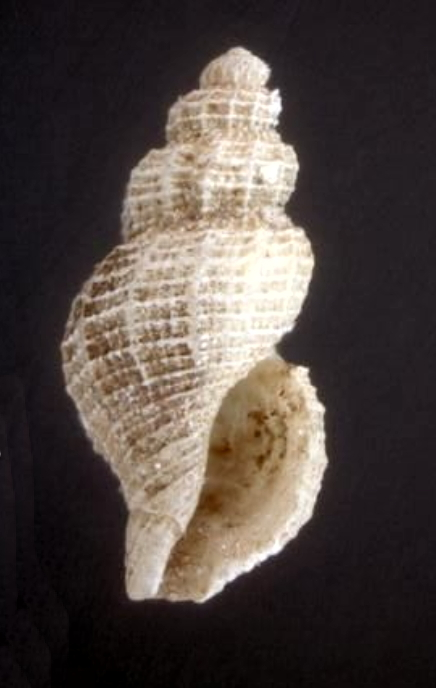
- shell of Asperdaphne bastowi (holotype at Museums Victoria)

Scientific classification
- Kingdom: Animalia
- Phylum: Mollusca
- Class: Gastropoda
- Subclass: Caenogastropoda
- Order: Neogastropoda
- Superfamily: Conoidea
- Family: Raphitomidae
- Genus: Asperdaphne
- Species: A. bastowi

Binomial name
- Asperdaphne bastowi (Gatliff & Gabriel, 1908)

Synonyms
- Daphnella bastowi Gatliff & Gabriel, 1908

= Asperdaphne bastowi =

Species of gastropod

Asperdaphne bastowi is a species of sea snail, a marine gastropod mollusk in the family Raphitomidae.

== Description ==
The length of the shell attains 4 mm, its diameter 1.75 mm.

(Original description) The small, greyish white shell contains 5½ whorls. These are convex, somewhat angled below the suture, which is impressed. The apex is dome-shaped, consisting of two whorls, the first being very small. They have numerous spiral striae, crossed at right angles by others of about double strength, but the spirals are more numerous. The other whorls are ribbed longitudinally, the ribs having a slight spiral trend. These ribs terminate a little below the suture, the intervening space carrying rather closely set angularly bent threads. Under the microscope these are thickened at the base and sharp at the edge, resembling a propeller blade, their contour following the outline of the sinus. Between the ribs the area is concave and cancellated, the spirals are somewhat stronger and appear on the ribs. The outer lip is thin and crenate. The sinus is rather deep, not broad. The inner lip is somewhat concave. The siphonal canal is short and slightly everted.

== Distribution ==
This marine species is endemic to Australia and occurs off South Australia and Victoria.
