= Austrodaphnella yemenensis =

Scientific classification
- Kingdom: Animalia
- Phylum: Mollusca
- Class: Gastropoda
- Subclass: Caenogastropoda
- Order: Neogastropoda
- Superfamily: Conoidea
- Family: Raphitomidae
- Genus: Austrodaphnella
- Species: A. yemenensis

Binomial name
- Austrodaphnella yemenensis Bonfitto, Sabelli & Morassi, 2001

Species of gastropod

Austrodaphnella yemenensis is a species of sea snail, a marine gastropod mollusk in the family Raphitomidae.

== Description ==
The length of the shell attains 8.6 mm, its diameter is 3.7 mm.

== Distribution ==
This marine species occurs in Southern Red Sea off Yemen.
