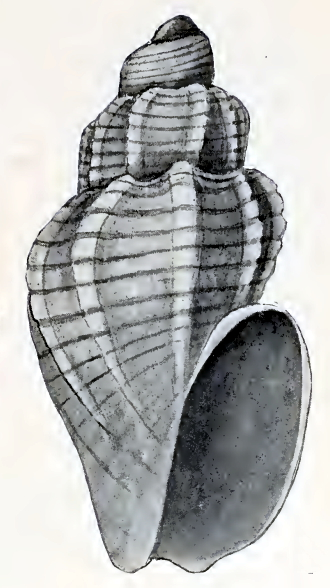
- Original image of a shell of Asperdaphne bela

Scientific classification
- Kingdom: Animalia
- Phylum: Mollusca
- Class: Gastropoda
- Subclass: Caenogastropoda
- Order: Neogastropoda
- Superfamily: Conoidea
- Family: Raphitomidae
- Genus: Asperdaphne
- Species: A. bela

Binomial name
- Asperdaphne bela Hedley, 1922

Synonyms
- Asperdaphne tasmanica May, 1916; Bela tasmanica May, 1915 (treated by Hedley as junior secondary homonym of Daphnella tasmanica Tenison Woods, 1877; Asperdaphne bela is a replacement name))

= Asperdaphne bela =

Species of gastropod

Asperdaphne bela is a species of sea snail, a marine gastropod mollusk in the family Raphitomidae.

== Description ==
The typical shell-length is 2.4 mm, its diameter 1.5 mm. Lives subtidally and offshore.

(Original description) The shell is small and ventricose. Its color is white with the front half of the body whorl brownish. The shell contains 3½ whorls, including a 1½ whorled protoconch. which is spirally lirate. The subsequent two whorls are rounded, crossed by strong axial ribs, about nine on the body whorl. They follow each other at the suture, and fade away on the base. These ribs are separated by spaces about twice as wide as themselves, and crossed by numerous flattened lirae, which are close together, and slightly corrugate the ribs. The aperture is large, oval, scarcely forming a siphonal canal. Above it forms a round shallow sinus.

== Distribution ==
This marine species is endemic to southeastern Australia and occurs off Tasmania
