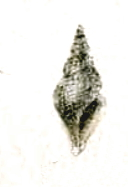
- Original image of a shell of Asperdaphne laceyi

Scientific classification
- Kingdom: Animalia
- Phylum: Mollusca
- Class: Gastropoda
- Subclass: Caenogastropoda
- Order: Neogastropoda
- Superfamily: Conoidea
- Family: Raphitomidae
- Genus: Asperdaphne
- Species: A. laceyi

Binomial name
- Asperdaphne laceyi (Sowerby III, 1889)

Synonyms
- Pleurotoma (Bela) laceyi Sowerby III, 1889; Pleurotoma laceyi G. B. Sowerby III, 1889 superseded combination

= Asperdaphne laceyi =

Species of gastropod

Asperdaphne laceyi is a species of sea snail, a marine gastropod mollusc in the family Raphitomidae.

== Description ==
The length of the shell attains 16 mm, its diameter 5 mm.

(Original description in Latin) The shell is fusiform, acuminated at both ends, and dull white. The spire is elongated and atapered to a sharp point. The whorls are roundly convex and are obliquely covered by numerous longitudinal folds. They are further sculpted spirally with numerous, narrow, crowded, and rounded fine ridges. The body whorl is rounded above and attenuated below, extending slightly forward. The aperture is elongate-ovate. The columella is slightly twisted, the outer lip) is slightly arcuate, and it is emarginate with a rather wide but shallow sinus. The siphonal canal is short.

== Distribution ==
This marine species occurs off Hong Kong
