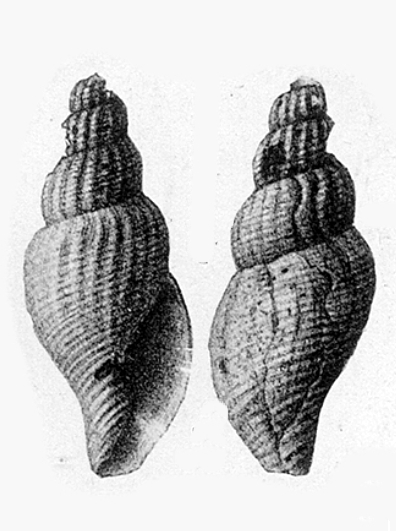
- Original image of a shell of Asperdaphne recticostulata

Scientific classification
- Kingdom: Animalia
- Phylum: Mollusca
- Class: Gastropoda
- Subclass: Caenogastropoda
- Order: Neogastropoda
- Superfamily: Conoidea
- Family: Raphitomidae
- Genus: Asperdaphne
- Species: A. recticostulata

Binomial name
- Asperdaphne recticostulata (Yokoyama, 1922)

Synonyms
- † Bela recticostulata Yokoyama, 1922

= Asperdaphne recticostulata =

Extinct species of gastropod

Asperdaphne recticostulata is an extinct species of sea snail, a marine gastropod mollusk in the family Raphitomidae.

== Distribution ==
Fossils of this marine species have been found in Pleistocene strata of the Chiba formation in Japan.
