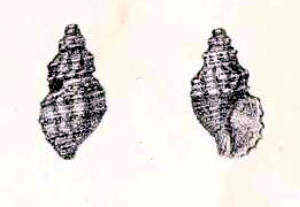
- Original image of a shell of Asperdaphne bitorquata

Scientific classification
- Kingdom: Animalia
- Phylum: Mollusca
- Class: Gastropoda
- Subclass: Caenogastropoda
- Order: Neogastropoda
- Superfamily: Conoidea
- Family: Raphitomidae
- Genus: Asperdaphne
- Species: A. bitorquata

Binomial name
- Asperdaphne bitorquata (Sowerby III, 1896)

Synonyms
- Daphnella bitorquata G.B. Sowerby III, 1896

= Asperdaphne bitorquata =

Species of gastropod

Asperdaphne bitorquata is a species of sea snail, a marine gastropod mollusk in the family Raphitomidae.

== Description ==
The length of the shell attains 4.5 mm, its diameter 2.5 mm.

This little, ovate shell is very dark brown, relieved by a pale zone between two white keels, crossed by dark-brown streaks. It contains 4½ subquadrate, angular whorls. The transverse lirae are pretty prominent, and the whole surface is roughened by minute laminae. The aperture is wide. The outer lip is arcuate with the posterior part slightly sinuate.

== Distribution ==
This marine species is endemic to Australia and occurs off South Australia and Victoria.
