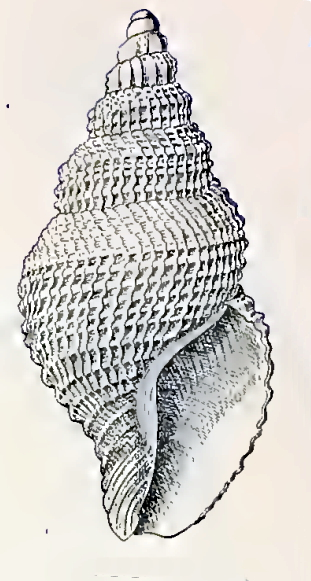
- Original image of a shell of Asperdaphne vestalis

Scientific classification
- Kingdom: Animalia
- Phylum: Mollusca
- Class: Gastropoda
- Subclass: Caenogastropoda
- Order: Neogastropoda
- Superfamily: Conoidea
- Family: Raphitomidae
- Genus: Asperdaphne
- Species: A. vestalis

Binomial name
- Asperdaphne vestalis (Hedley, 1903)

Synonyms
- Daphnella vestalis Hedley, 1903

= Asperdaphne vestalis =

Species of gastropod

Asperdaphne vestalis is a species of sea snail, a marine gastropod mollusk in the family Raphitomidae.

== Description ==
The length of the shell attains 8 mm, its diameter 3.75 mm.

(Original description) The ovate, rather solid shell is angled at the shoulder, constricted at the base. Its colour is white. It contains five whorls, plus a two-whorled protoconch. The shell shows rounded spiral cords, the longitudinal series amounting to about twenty on the body whorl and eight on the penultimate. These are crossing and knotting a spiral series amounting to about thirty-seven on the penultimate. The longitudinals vanish at the base and are effaced behind the aperture. The suture is channelled. The protoconch is smooth. The aperture is wide. The outer lip is simple and without sinus.

== Distribution ==
This marine species is endemic to Australia and occurs off New South Wales, South Australia and Victoria.
