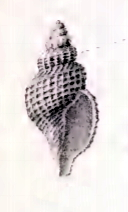
- Original image of a shell of Austrodaphnella alcestis

Scientific classification
- Kingdom: Animalia
- Phylum: Mollusca
- Class: Gastropoda
- Subclass: Caenogastropoda
- Order: Neogastropoda
- Superfamily: Conoidea
- Family: Raphitomidae
- Genus: Austrodaphnella
- Species: A. alcestis

Binomial name
- Austrodaphnella alcestis (Melvill, 1906)

Synonyms
- Daphnella (Pleurotomella) alcestis Melvill, 1906

= Austrodaphnella alcestis =

Species of gastropod

Austrodaphnella alcestis is a species of sea snail, a marine gastropod mollusk in the family Raphitomidae.

== Description ==
The length of the shell attains 6.5 mm, its diameter 1.5 mm.

== Distribution ==
This marine species occurs in the Gulf of Oman
