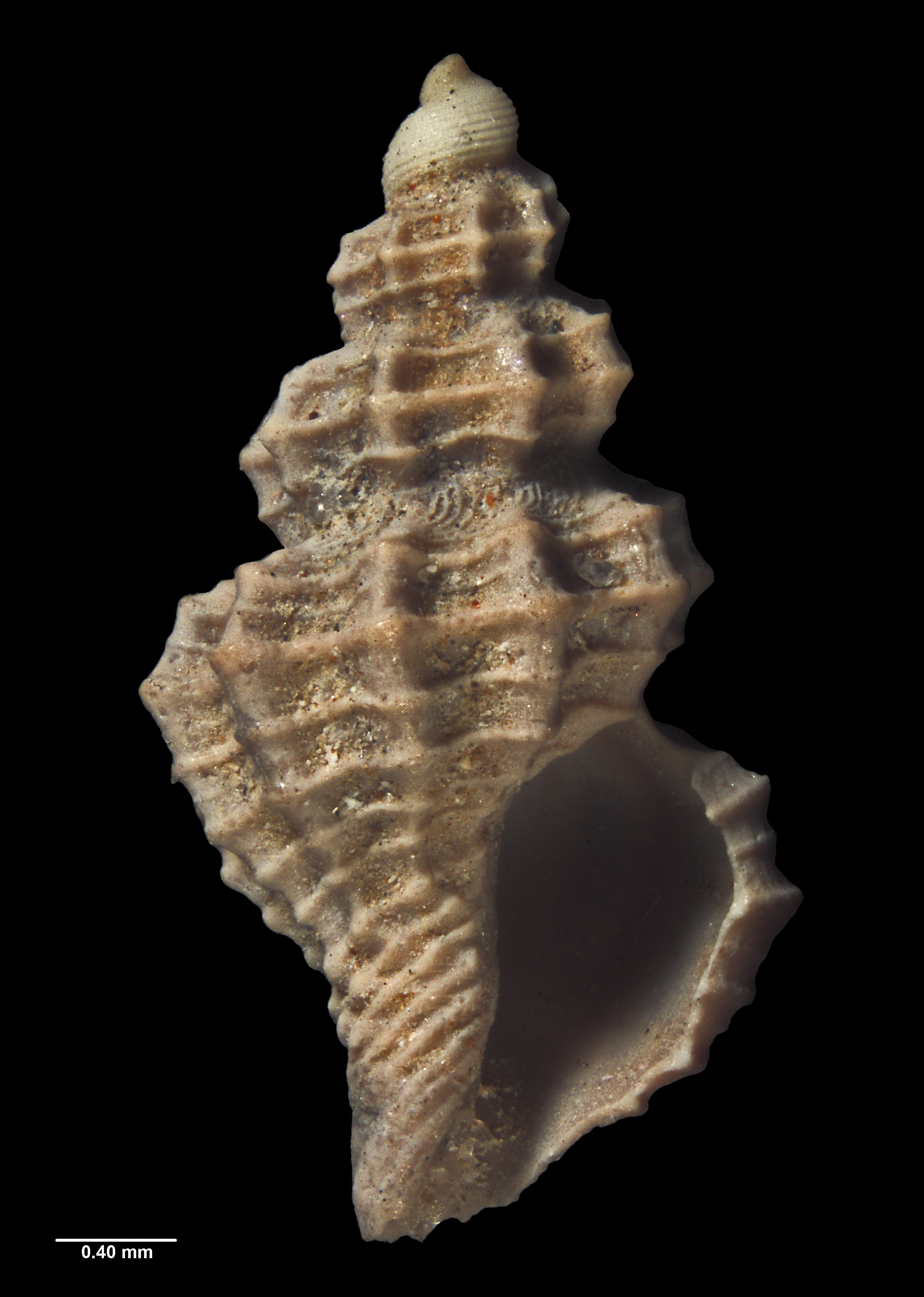
- Holotype from Auckland War Memorial Museum

Scientific classification
- Kingdom: Animalia
- Phylum: Mollusca
- Class: Gastropoda
- Subclass: Caenogastropoda
- Order: Neogastropoda
- Family: Raphitomidae
- Genus: Asperdaphne
- Species: †A. exsculpta

Binomial name
- †Asperdaphne exsculpta A. W. B. Powell, 1944

Synonyms
- † Asperdaphne (Aspertilla) exsculpta A. W. B. Powell, 1944 superseded combination; † Aspertilla exsculpta A. W. B. Powell, 1944

= Asperdaphne exsculpta =

Asperdaphne exsculpta Temporal range: middle Miocene

Extinct species of gastropod

Asperdaphne exsculpta is an extinct species of sea snail, a marine gastropod mollusc, in the family Raphitomidae. Fossils of the species date to the middle Miocene strata of the St Vincent Basin of South Australia.

== Description ==
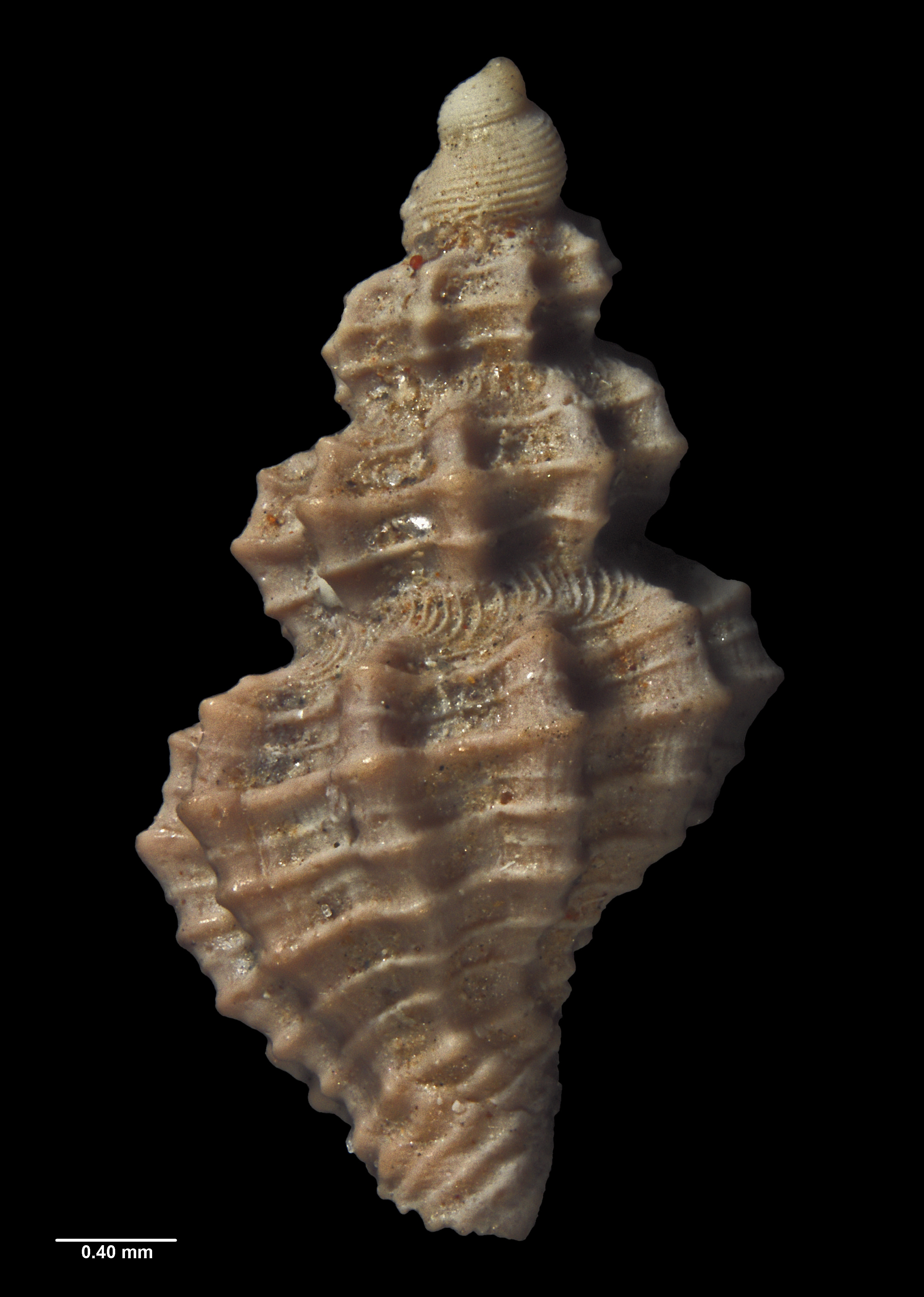
Reverse view of holotype

In the original description, Powell described the species as follows:

Shell small, broad, with angulate whorls, deeply excavated at the sutures. Protoconch papillate, of 2 1/2 whorls, tip exserted, peg-like, the whole sculptured with 10 spiral lirations abruptly terminated at the first axial of the post-nuclear sculpture. Axials heavy, rounded, 10 per whorl, crossed by sharply raised spiral cords and interstitial threads. Spire-whorls with three spiral cords, body-whorl with six, each inter-space bearing a single thread. Additional to these, there is one thread on the concave shoulder just above the uppermost cord, and eight strong, closely spaced cords on the anterior end. Sinus sutural, moderately deep.

The holotype of the species has a height of 3.9 mm (0.15 in), and a diameter of 2.15 mm (0.085 in).

== Taxonomy ==
The species was first described by A. W. B. Powell in 1944 as Asperdaphne (Aspertilla) exsculpta. The holotype was collected by W. Howchin and J.C. Verco in 1919 from the Metropolitan Abattoirs Bore in Adelaide at a depth of 122–152 m (400–499 ft). It is part of the Finlay Collection, held by the Auckland War Memorial Museum.

== Distribution ==
This extinct marine species occurs in middle Miocene strata of the St Vincent Basin of South Australia, including the Dry Creek Sands.
