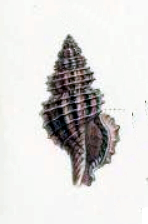
- Original image of a shell of Asperdaphne albovirgulata

Scientific classification
- Kingdom: Animalia
- Phylum: Mollusca
- Class: Gastropoda
- Subclass: Caenogastropoda
- Order: Neogastropoda
- Superfamily: Conoidea
- Family: Raphitomidae
- Genus: Asperdaphne
- Species: A. albovirgulata

Binomial name
- Asperdaphne albovirgulata (Souverbie, 1860)

Synonyms
- List: Clathurella albovirgulata (Souverbie, 1860); Mangilia albovirgulata (Souverbie, 1860); Pleurotoma albovirgulata Souverbie, 1860 (original combination)

= Asperdaphne albovirgulata =

Species of gastropod

Asperdaphne albovirgulata is a species of sea snail, a marine gastropod mollusk in the family Raphitomidae.

== Description ==
The length of the shell attains 14 mm, its diameter 6.5 mm.

(Original description in French) The elongated shell is fusiform (spindle-shaped), attenuated at both extremities. The spire is very pointed and is formed of eight well-defined whorls that are regularly convex and slightly depressed above.

The first whorl is smooth, translucent, and appears enameled. The subsequent whorls are covered with longitudinal ribs which are straight, prominent, somewhat blunt, subalternate (arranged in an irregular or alternating pattern), and spaced apart. These longitudinal ribs are crossed by spiral ribs. There are four spiral ribs on each whorl (except the body whorl, where they are more numerous); they are closer together and sharper. The two central spiral ribs are the most pronounced. These spiral ribs cross the vertical ribs and their interspaces Where they pass over the vertical ribs, they form small, prominent nodosities, compressed into transverse crests. As a result of this intersection, the shell surface assumes a broadly and deeply latticed or trellised appearance, forming meshes that are transversely elongated.

The aperture is semi-oval and terminates in a very short siphonal canal, slightly dilated at its end. The columella originates near the upper quarter of the aperture, is rounded, and remains straight until the base of the siphonal canal, where it turns slightly outward. It is surrounded by four to five strong, very oblique folds (or ridges). The outer lip is strongly arched and features a small festooned lamella (scalloped plate) along its edge, which is implanted on a thick ridge formed by the final longitudinal rib and is toothed on the interior. At its origin (near the suture), it presents a small, short, and narrow sinus.

The exterior of this shell is lustrous, colored a very soft lilac with white comma-shaped spots below the suture. The edge of the spiral ribs is also white. However, when the shell is examined at a small distance with the naked eye, this whiteness diminishes on every second longitudinal rib, making these ribs appear alternately lighter and darker. The interior is a rosy lilac.

== Distribution ==
This marine species occurs off New Caledonia.
