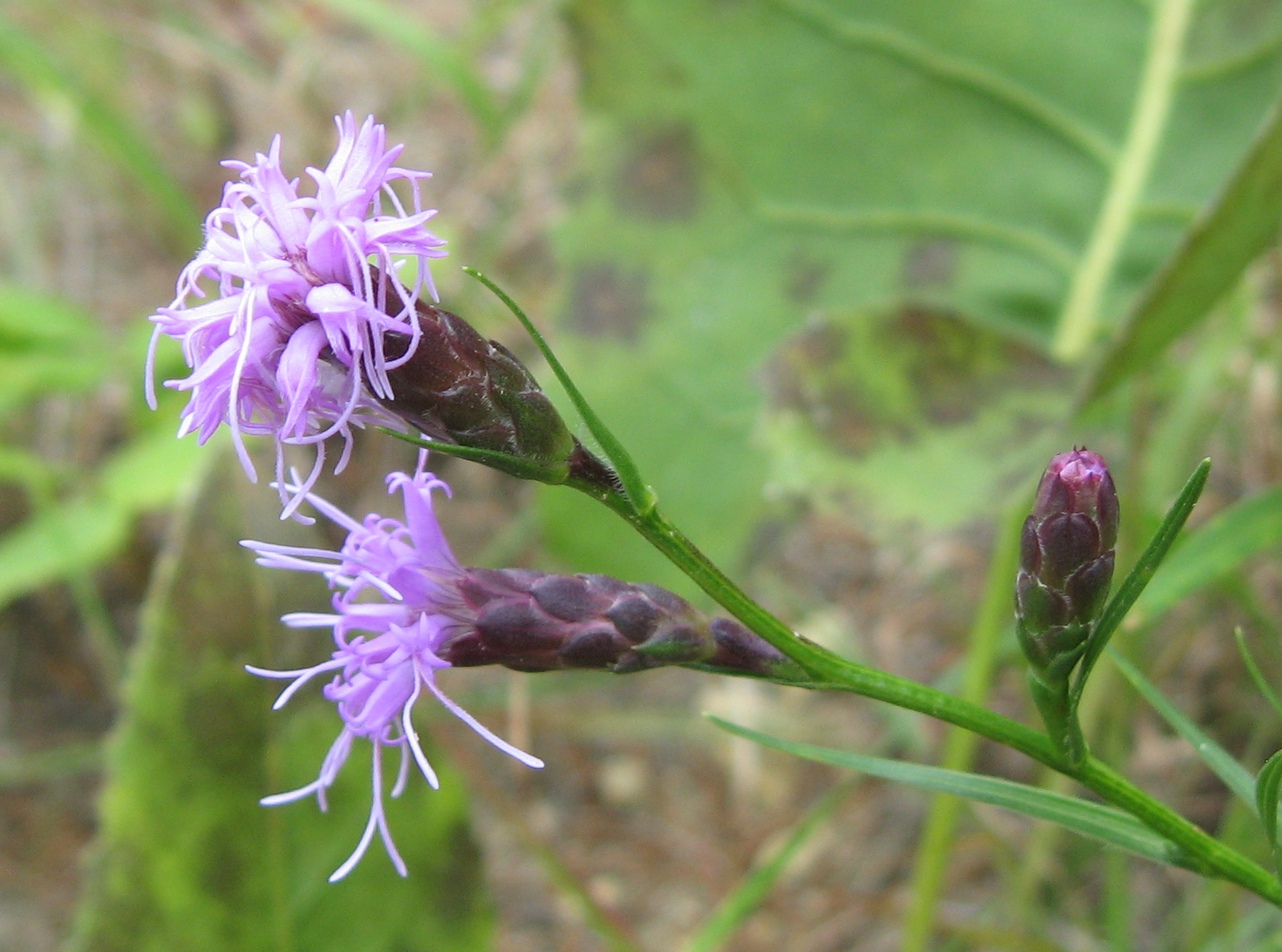

Scientific classification
- Kingdom: Plantae
- Clade: Tracheophytes
- Clade: Angiosperms
- Clade: Eudicots
- Clade: Asterids
- Order: Asterales
- Family: Asteraceae
- Genus: Liatris
- Species: L. cylindracea

Binomial name
- Liatris cylindracea Michx.

= Liatris cylindracea =

Species of flowering plant

Liatris cylindracea (known as barrelhead blazing star, cylindric or cylindrical blazing star, Ontario blazing star, or dwarf blazing star) is a plant species in the family Asteraceae. It is native to eastern North America, where its populations are concentrated in the Midwestern United States. It is found in habitats such as prairies, limestone and sandstone outcroppings, bluffs, barrens, glades, woodlands and dunes. This species is considered threatened in the state of Ohio.

== Description ==
The cylindrical blazing star grows from rounded or sometimes elongated corms, which produce hairless stems 20–60 cm (8–24 in) tall. At the top of the stem is a single flower head or a loose to dense cluster (raceme, spike, or panicle) of 2 to 28 flower heads. Each flower head has 10–35 florets, and is stemless or has a stem 2–10 mm (3/32–13/32 in) long that orients the head upwards. The flowers bloom in mid to late summer, starting at the top of the cluster.

The basal and cauline leaves usually have three nerves, though sometimes up to five. They are long and thin, ranging from 8 to 25 cm (3 1/4 to 9 3/4 in) long and 2 to 6 mm (3/32 to 1/4 in) wide. The leaves are mostly hairless or may have some hairs on the margins. Some plants in Kentucky and Missouri are hairy; this may indicate hybridization with Liatris hirsuta. The largest leaves are a little above the bottom of the stem; above that, the leaves become gradually smaller.

The seed are produced in fruits (cypselae) that are 5–7 mm (3/16–9/32 in) long with feathery pappi.

Its roots can reach depths of 15 ft (4.6 m).
