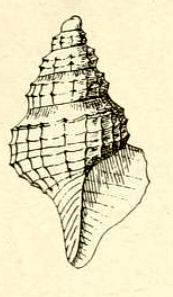
- Original image of a shell of Pleurotomella aculeata

Scientific classification
- Kingdom: Animalia
- Phylum: Mollusca
- Class: Gastropoda
- Subclass: Caenogastropoda
- Order: Neogastropoda
- Superfamily: Conoidea
- Family: Raphitomidae
- Genus: Pleurotomella
- Species: P. aculeata

Binomial name
- Pleurotomella aculeata (Webster, 1906)

Synonyms
- Asperdaphne aculeata (Webster, 1906); Daphnella aculeata Webster, 1906 (original combination)

= Pleurotomella aculeata =

Species of gastropod

Pleurotomella aculeata is a species of sea snail, a marine gastropod mollusk in the family Raphitomidae.

== Description ==
The length of the shell attains 6 mm, its diameter 3.3 mm.

(Original description) The shell is buff-coloured, lighter towards the apex and siphonal canal. It contains five whorls, including a reticulated protoconch of 1¼ whorl.

The sculpture : Longitudinally and slightly diagonally ribbed, the ribs crossed by two strong spiral keels. The ribs and keels are about equal in strength, the intersections forming sharp points. The body whorl has upon the base four additional keels, the space between the two peripheral keels and the four on the base being greater than that between any other two. A fine thread is visible in this wide space, there is also a duplication of the posterior keel. The body whorl has about twelve ribs. The sutures of the early whorls are sharp, those of the latter are concavely round. The columella descends vertically from the body whorl. The siphonal canal, which is straight, has about eight faint striations. The space between the suture and the first spiral keel contains the anal fasciole. Under magnification one can see faint radial striations between the keels, also the reticulation of the protoconch. The sinus of the type is so little damaged that to draw it perfect can scarcely be called reconstruction.

== Distribution ==
This marine species is endemic to New Zealand and occurs off Northland.
