= Asperdaphne torresensis =

Scientific classification
- Kingdom: Animalia
- Phylum: Mollusca
- Class: Gastropoda
- Subclass: Caenogastropoda
- Order: Neogastropoda
- Superfamily: Conoidea
- Family: Raphitomidae
- Genus: Asperdaphne
- Species: A. torresensis

Binomial name
- Asperdaphne torresensis (Shuto, 1983)

Synonyms
- Austrodaphnella torresensis Shuto, 1983

Species of gastropod

Asperdaphne torresensis is a species of sea snail, a marine gastropod mollusk in the family Raphitomidae.

== Description ==
The length of the shell attains 5.15 mm, its diameter 3.2 mm.

== Distribution ==
This marine species is endemic to Australia and occurs off Queensland.
