= Pleurotomella sepulta =

Scientific classification
- Kingdom: Animalia
- Phylum: Mollusca
- Class: Gastropoda
- Subclass: Caenogastropoda
- Order: Neogastropoda
- Superfamily: Conoidea
- Family: Raphitomidae
- Genus: Pleurotomella
- Species: P. sepulta

Binomial name
- Pleurotomella sepulta (Laseron, 1954)

Synonyms
- Asperdaphne sepulta Laseron, 1954 (original combination)

Species of gastropod

Pleurotomella sepulta is a species of sea snail, a marine gastropod mollusk in the family Raphitomidae.

== Distribution ==
This marine species is endemic to Australia and occurs off New South Wales.
