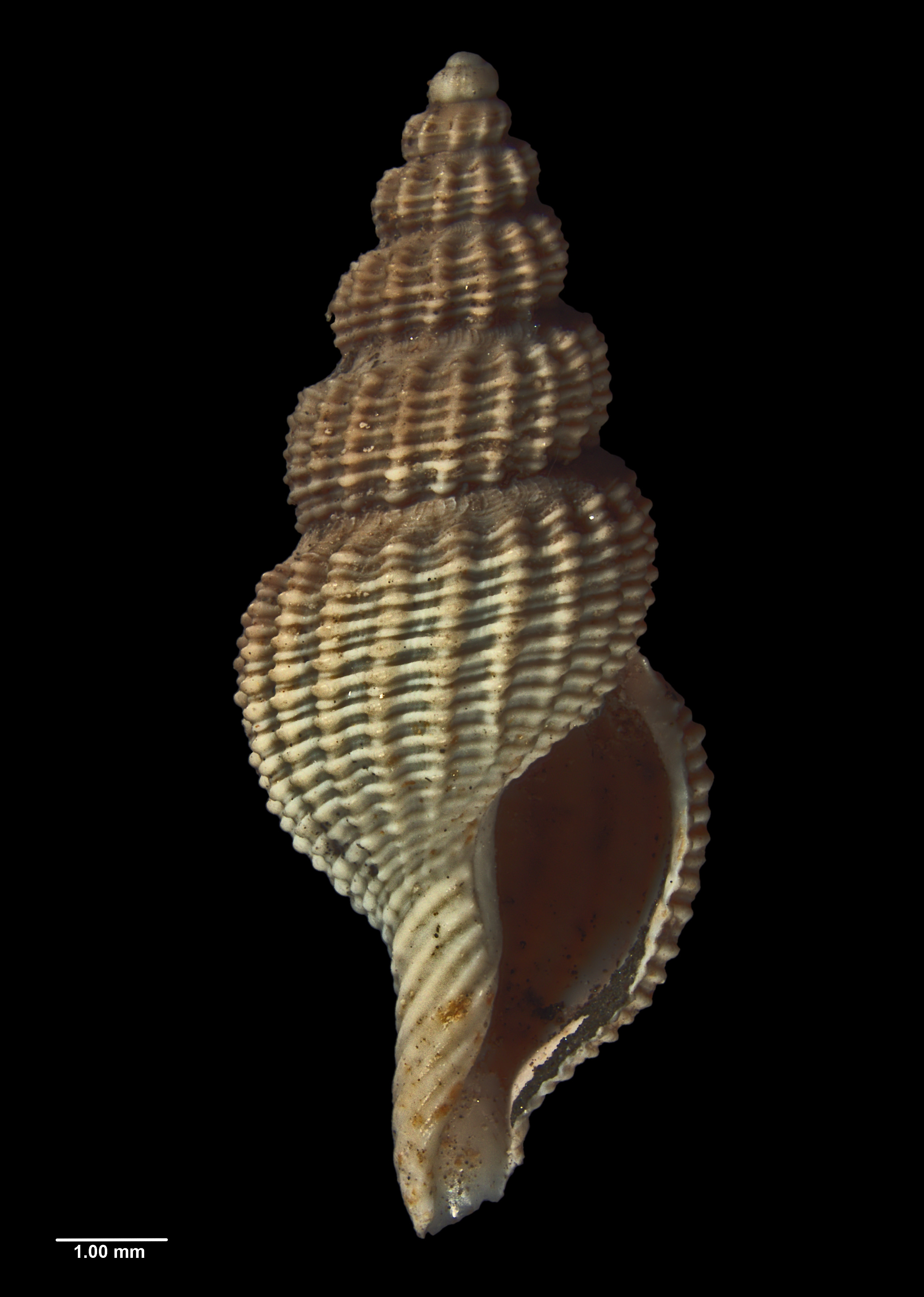
- Holotype from Auckland War Memorial Museum

Scientific classification
- Kingdom: Animalia
- Phylum: Mollusca
- Class: Gastropoda
- Subclass: Caenogastropoda
- Order: Neogastropoda
- Family: Raphitomidae
- Genus: Asperdaphne
- Species: †A. balcombensis

Binomial name
- †Asperdaphne balcombensis A. W. B. Powell, 1944

Synonyms
- †Pleurotomella balcombensis (A. W. B. Powell, 1944) superseded combination

= Asperdaphne balcombensis =

Asperdaphne balcombensis Temporal range: middle Miocene

Extinct species of gastropod

Asperdaphne balcombensis is an extinct species of sea snail, a marine gastropod mollusc, in the family Raphitomidae. Fossils of the species date to the middle Miocene strata of the Port Phillip Basin of Victoria, Australia.

== Description ==
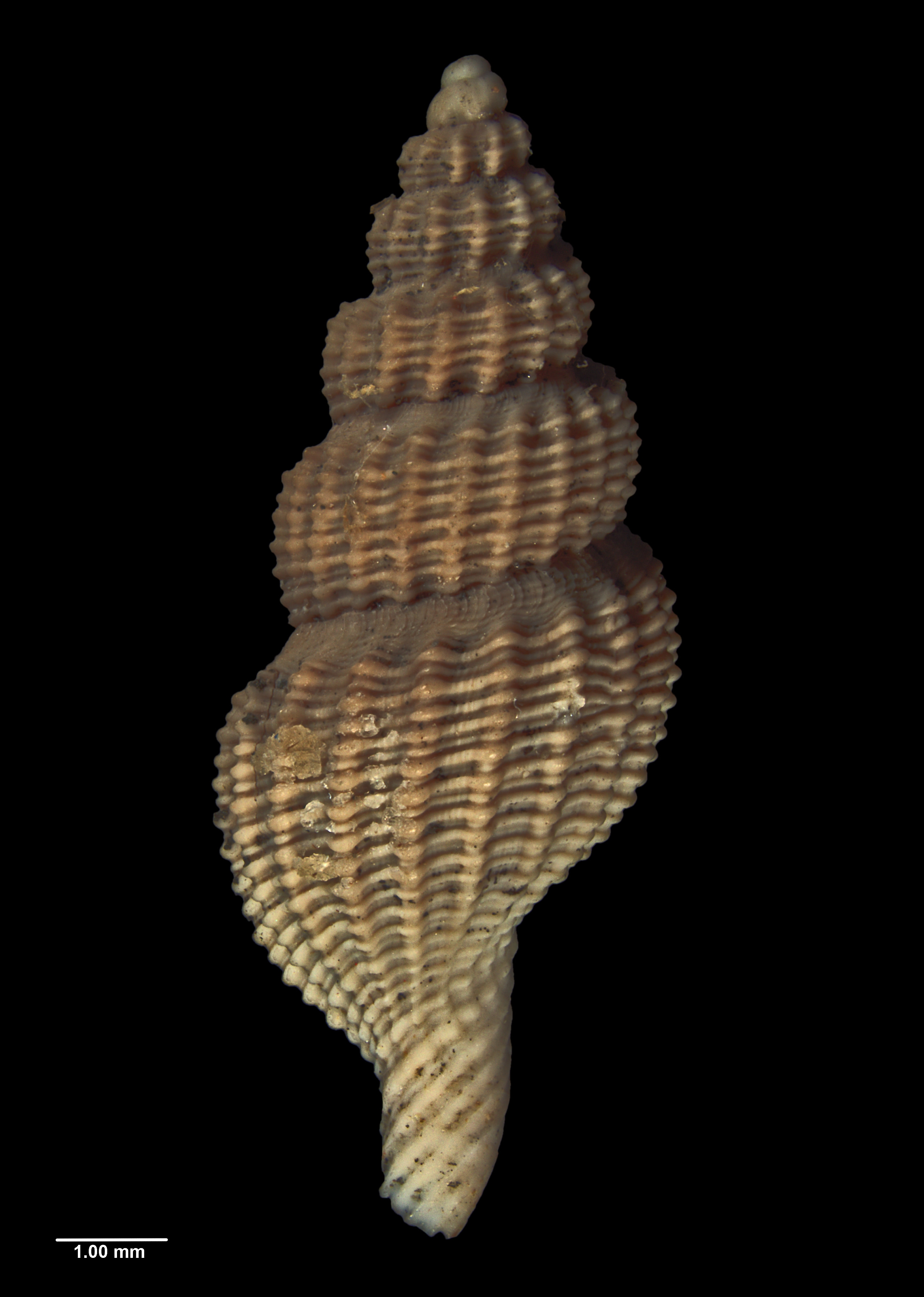
Reverse view of holotype

In the original description, Powell described the species as follows:

Fusiform, with convex whorls, excavated base and moderately long, flexed and recurved anterior canal. Sculptured with numerous sharply raised, rounded axials, crossed by crisp primary and secondary spiral cords. Protoconch of 2 1/2 rounded, finely striated whorls, tip small, in-rolled: last whorl with a few weak, irregular axials; terminated by a thin sinuous rim. Shoulder slight, at four-fifths whorl height, sculptured with 5-6 fine spiral lirations crossed by arcuate threads which follow the curve of the sinus. The axials run from the shoulder angle over the base to the anterior end, 20 per whorl. On the penultimate these are crossed by 6 crisp, narrow primary cords with a thread in each interspace. On the body-whorl there are about 16 primary cords. The anterior end bears 6 strong cords, but no axials. Outer lip thin, sinus sutural, typical, reversed "L"-shaped, but not deep.

The holotype of the species has a height of 11 mm (0.43 in), and a diameter of 4.25 mm (0.167 in).

== Taxonomy ==
The species was first described by A. W. B. Powell in 1944. In 2011, A. G. Beu recombined the species as Pleurotomella balcombensis, a change not accepted by Thomas A. Darragh (2024) or the World Register of Marine Species. The holotype was collected prior to 1944 from Fossil Beach, Balcombe Bay, Victoria, Australia. It is held by the Auckland War Memorial Museum.

== Distribution ==
This extinct marine species occurs in middle Miocene strata of the Port Phillip Basin of Victoria, Australia, including the Gellibrand Formation.
