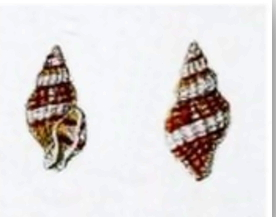
- Original image of a shell of Apispiralia albocincta

Scientific classification
- Kingdom: Animalia
- Phylum: Mollusca
- Class: Gastropoda
- Subclass: Caenogastropoda
- Order: Neogastropoda
- Superfamily: Conoidea
- Family: Mangeliidae
- Genus: Apispiralia
- Species: A. albocincta

Binomial name
- Apispiralia albocincta (Angas, 1871)

Synonyms
- Asperdaphne albocincta (Angas, 1871); Clathurella albocincta Angas, 1871 (original combination)

= Apispiralia albocincta =

Species of gastropod

Apispiralia albocincta is a species of sea snail, a marine gastropod mollusk in the family Mangeliidae.

== Description ==
The moderately solid shell is reddish brown, with a rather broad white band on the middle of the body whorl, visible on the spire. The outer lip is thickened and dentate within.

== Distribution ==
This marine species is endemic to Australia and occurs off New South Wales, Australia.
