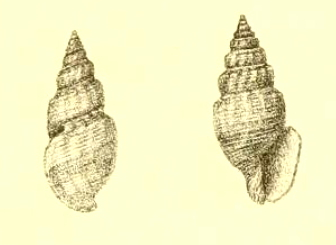
- Original image of a shell of Pleurotomella vercoi

Scientific classification
- Kingdom: Animalia
- Phylum: Mollusca
- Class: Gastropoda
- Subclass: Caenogastropoda
- Order: Neogastropoda
- Superfamily: Conoidea
- Family: Raphitomidae
- Genus: Pleurotomella
- Species: P. vercoi

Binomial name
- Pleurotomella vercoi (Sowerby III, 1896)

Synonyms
- Asperdaphne vercoi (G. B. Sowerby III, 1896); Daphnella vercoi Sowerby III, 1896

= Pleurotomella vercoi =

Species of gastropod

Pleurotomella vercoi is a species of sea snail, a marine gastropod mollusk in the family Raphitomidae.

== Description ==
The length of the shell attains 20 mm, its diameter 8 mm.

(Original description) A thin, delicately sculptured, acuminate-ovate shell with an acute spire. It contains 8½ whorls, including 2 smooth whorls in the protoconch. The other whorls are convex and obtusely angulate. The ribs are of an undecided character, entirely disappearing on the body whorl. The many spiral lirae are narrow and close, and crossed by extremely delicate and profuse oblique laminae. The type specimen, besides the irregular light-brown markings, has two narrow zones below the periphery. While others are pale straw-colour, without markings. All the specimens are similar in detail of sculpture, but sometimes the longitudinal ribs are only to be seen on the upper whorls. And in one shell the body whorl is distinctly ribbed. The aperture is wide. The columella is straight. The outer lip is thin, simple and moderately produced forward in the middle.

== Distribution ==
This marine species is endemic to Australia and occurs off South Australia.
