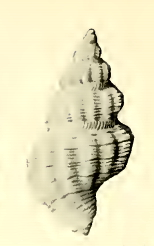
- Original image of a shell of Pleurotomella compacta

Scientific classification
- Kingdom: Animalia
- Phylum: Mollusca
- Class: Gastropoda
- Subclass: Caenogastropoda
- Order: Neogastropoda
- Superfamily: Conoidea
- Family: Raphitomidae
- Genus: Pleurotomella
- Species: P. compacta

Binomial name
- Pleurotomella compacta (Hedley, 1922)

Synonyms
- Asperdaphne compacta Hedley, 1922 (original combination)

= Pleurotomella compacta =

Species of sea snail

Pleurotomella compacta is a species of sea snail, a marine gastropod mollusk in the family Raphitomidae.

== Description ==
The length of the shell attains 6.5 mm, its diameter 3 mm.

(Original description) The small shell is rather solid and has an ovate-conic shape. Its Colour is uniform buff. The shell contains six whorls, of which two compose the protoconch.

Sculpture: The protoconch is gradated, and coarsely, spirally, engraved. The subsequent whorls are rounded and excavate at the fasciole. The radial ribs are prominent, rounded, extending from the fasciolae to the base, set their own breadth apart, about twelve to a whorl. The spirals are delicate threads overriding the radials. On the body whorl they amount to twenty-four, of which three or four on the periphery are larger than the rest. The fasciolae is sharply sculptured by crescentic lamellae. The aperture is imperfect in the holotype. The sinus is sutural and of moderate depth.

== Distribution ==
This marine species is endemic to Australia and occurs off New South Wales.
