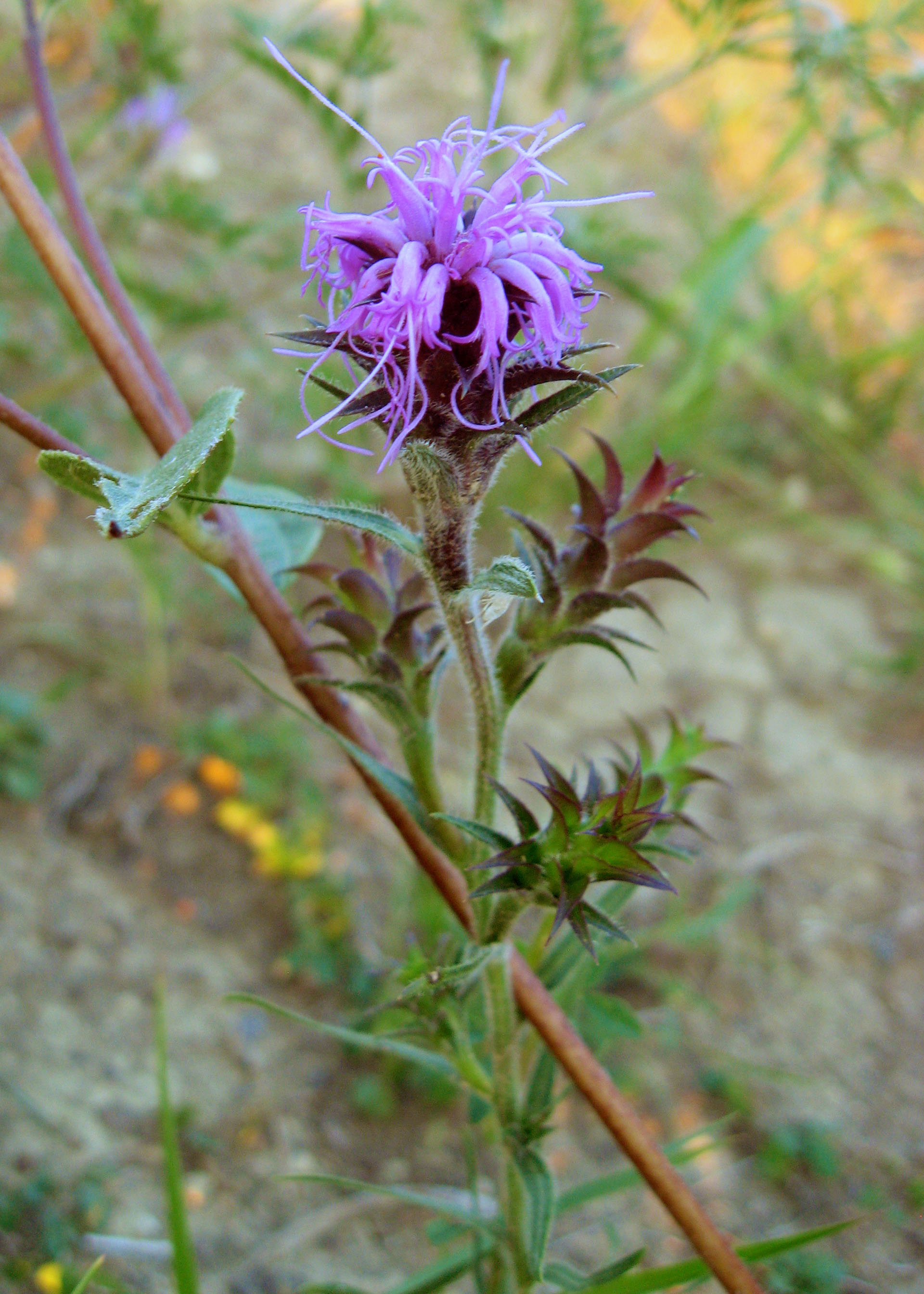

Scientific classification
- Kingdom: Plantae
- Clade: Tracheophytes
- Clade: Angiosperms
- Clade: Eudicots
- Clade: Asterids
- Order: Asterales
- Family: Asteraceae
- Genus: Liatris
- Species: L. squarrosa

Binomial name
- Liatris squarrosa (L.) Michx.

= Liatris squarrosa =

Species of flowering plant

Liatris squarrosa, commonly called the scaly blazingstar, is an herbaceous perennial plant native to eastern and central North America, with most populations in the Southeastern United States. It is a somewhat conservative species, often found in dry or rocky areas of native prairie and savanna vegetation. It produces purple flowerheads in the summer.

Liatris squarrosa is divided into distinct varieties which are sometimes treated as separate species. These are:

- Liatris squarrosa var. glabrata - stems hairless; found in the Great Plains
- Liatris squarrosa var. squarrosa - stems pubescent; found in the eastern United States
