= Compacta =

Compacta, a Latin adjective for compact, may refer to:

- Compacta (genus), a genus of moths
- Compacta (typeface), a typeface

and also

- In mathematics, the plural of compactum, meaning a compact set
- Pars compacta, a portion of the substantia nigra in anatomy

== See also ==
- Compactum
