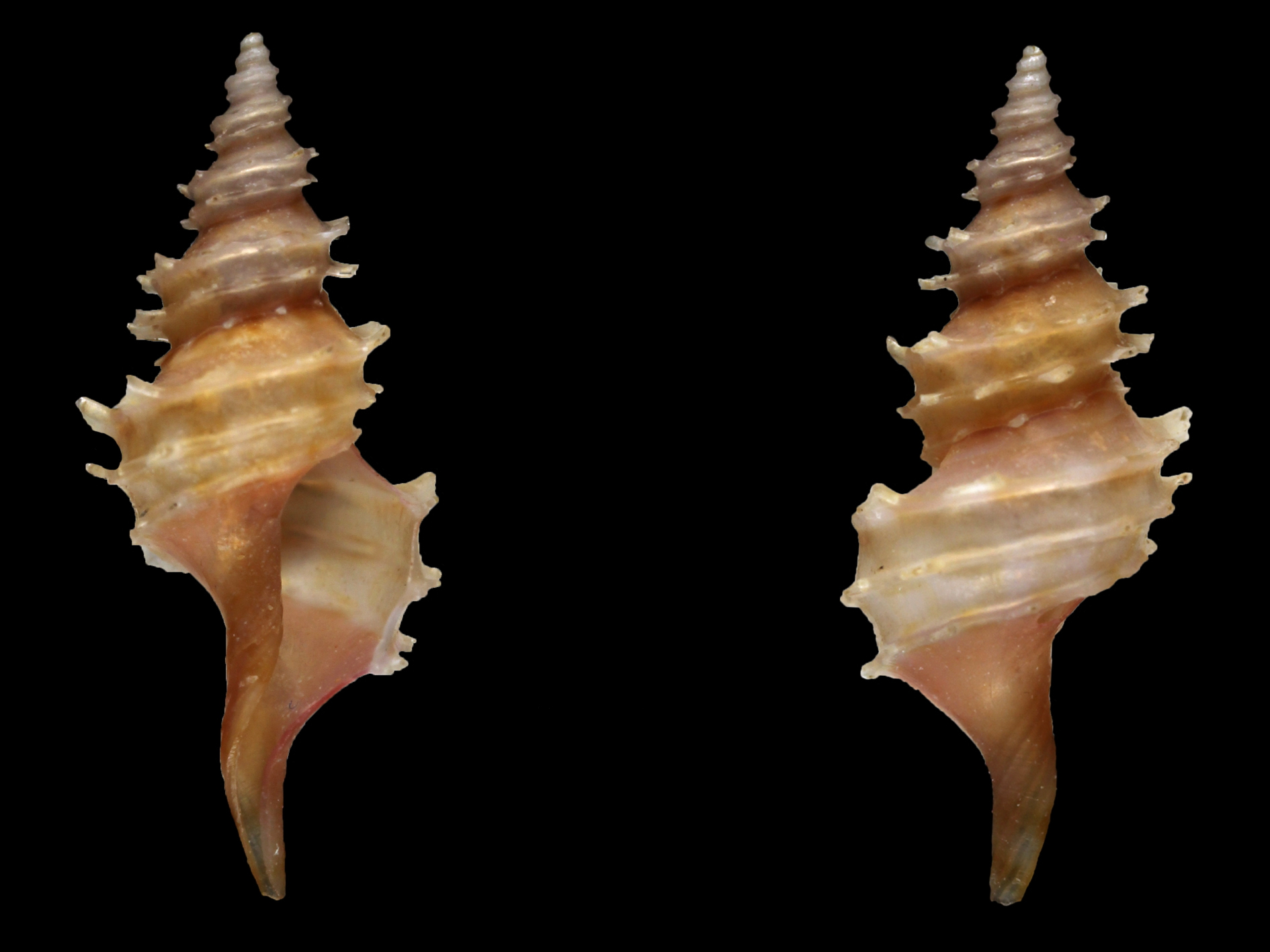
- Shell of Veprecula polyacantha (paratype at the MNHN, Paris)

Scientific classification
- Kingdom: Animalia
- Phylum: Mollusca
- Class: Gastropoda
- Subclass: Caenogastropoda
- Order: Neogastropoda
- Superfamily: Conoidea
- Family: Raphitomidae
- Genus: Veprecula; Melvill, 1917

Type species
- Clathurella sykesii Melvill & Standen, 1903

Synonyms
- Clathurina (Veprecula) Melvill, 1917 (original rank); Mordica Dall, 1924

= Veprecula =

Genus of gastropods

Veprecula is a genus of sea snails, marine gastropod mollusks in the family Raphitomidae.

== Description ==
(Original description) This genus has been created by Melvill in 1917 for a series of deep-water species of Clathurella with several peculiarities.

The small, thin, delicate shell has a pale brown or white, fusiform spire, either very attenuate, or pagodiform, or broader, and ventricose, always much suturally impressed. The shell contains 10-12 whorls with 4-5 whorlsin the protoconch. The first of these is smooth, the second to the fourth or fifth are very finely longitudinally radially costulate. The remainder are either few or closely ribbed, crossed by frequent or more distant lirations, acutely echinate at the points of junction, interstices appearing deeply seated, almost smooth, quadrate or oblong. The aperture is oblong. The outer lip is thin. The sinus is deep and wide, situated immediately below the suture. The siphonal canal is produced and fusiform.

== Species ==
Species within the genus Veprecula include:

- † Veprecula adelaidensis A. W. B. Powell, 1944
- Veprecula arethusa (Dall, 1918)
- Veprecula bandensis Sysoev, 1997
- Veprecula brunonia (Dall, 1924)
- Veprecula cooperi Mestayer, 1919
- Veprecula crystallina Stahlschmidt, Chino & Kilburn, 2012
- Veprecula echinulata (Thiele, 1925)
- Veprecula gracilispira (Smith E. A., 1879)
- Veprecula hedleyi (Melvill, 1904)
- Veprecula pungens (Gould, 1860)
- Veprecula scala Hedley, 1922
- Veprecula sculpta (Hinds, 1843)
- Veprecula spanionema (Melvill, 1917)
- Veprecula sykesii (Melvill & Standen, 1903)
- Veprecula tornipila McLean & Poorman, 1971
- Veprecula vacillata Hedley, 1922
- Veprecula vepratica (Hedley, 1903)

Species brought into synonymy

- Veprecula menecharmes Melvill, 1923: synonym of Tritonoturris menecharmes (Melvill, 1923)
- Veprecula morra (Dall, 1881): synonym of Rimosodaphnella morra (Dall, 1881)
- Veprecula polyacantha Stahlschmidt, Chino & Kilburn, 2012: synonym of Famelica polyacantha (Stahlschmidt, Chino & Kilburn, 2012) (original combination)
- Veprecula reticulosa Smith, 1882: synonym of Veprecula arethusa (Dall, 1918)
- Veprecula togetoges Nomura & Niino, 1940: synonym of Veprecula arethusa (Dall, 1918)
