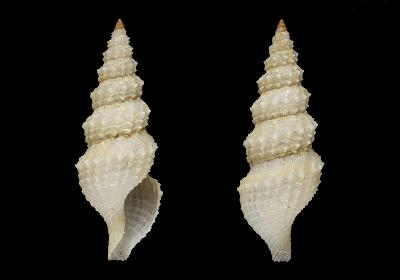
- Shell of Rimosodaphnella solomonensis (holotype at MNHN, Paris)

Scientific classification
- Kingdom: Animalia
- Phylum: Mollusca
- Class: Gastropoda
- Subclass: Caenogastropoda
- Order: Neogastropoda
- Superfamily: Conoidea
- Family: Raphitomidae
- Genus: Rimosodaphnella; Cossmann, 1916

Type species
- † Murex textilis Brocchi, 1814

Species
- See text

Synonyms
- Daphnella (Rimosodaphnella) Cossmann, 1916

= Rimosodaphnella =

Genus of gastropods

Rimosodaphnella is a genus of sea snails, marine gastropod mollusks in the family Raphitomidae.

== Description ==
(Original description) The diagnosis that Cossmann previously provided in support of Bellardiella does not apply - as we have seen above - to the genotype which is a typical Clathurella. It remains to name the shells which, like Pl. textilis, are not true Daphnella, because of their more twisted and shorter siphonal canal, their more elongated spire, and their narrower aperture in front. This group absolutely deviates from Clathurella because of its thin outer lip, its very deep sinus, its unpleated columella, so that there is only a distant analogy in ornamentation. Cossmann therefore takes up for this group - as a subgenus of Daphnella - the name Rimosodaphnella

== Species ==
Species within the genus Rimosodaphnella include:

- Rimosodaphnella angulata (Habe & Masuda, 1990)
- Rimosodaphnella brunneolineata Bonfitto & Morassi, 2013
- Rimosodaphnella deroyae McLean & Poorman, 1971
- Rimosodaphnella guaradara Criscione, Hallan, Puillandre & Fedosov, 2021
- Rimosodaphnella morra (Dall, 1881)
- Rimosodaphnella semicolon (Wood, 1842)
- Rimosodaphnella solomonensis Bonfitto & Morassi, 2013
- Rimosodaphnella tenuipurpurata Bonfitto & Morassi, 2013
- † Rimosodaphnella textilis (Brocchi, 1814)
- Rimosodaphnella truvana Criscione, Hallan, Puillandre & Fedosov, 2021

Species brought into synonymy

- Rimosodaphnella sculpta (Hinds, 1843): synonym of Veprecula sculpta (Hinds, 1843)
