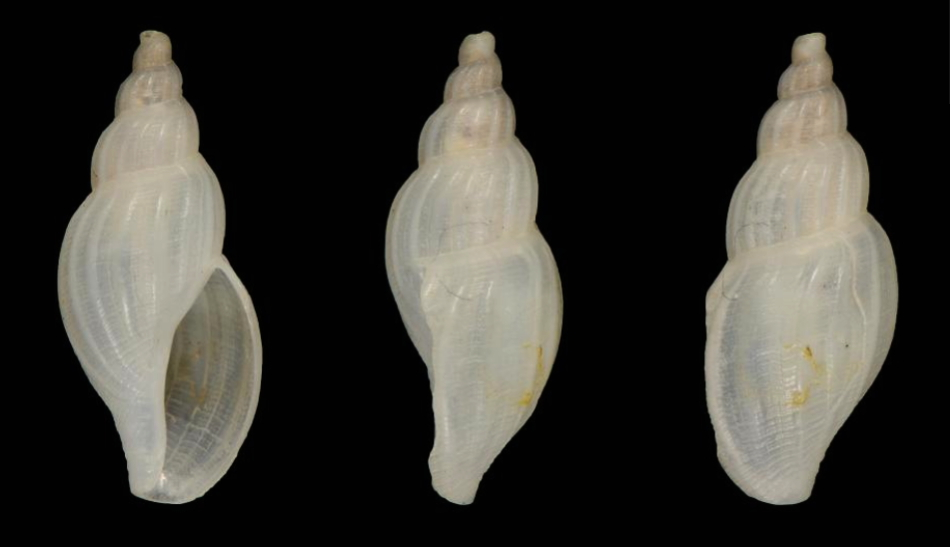
- Shell of Daphnella capensis (holotype of the synonym Daphnella alfredensis at the Smithsonian Institution)

Scientific classification
- Kingdom: Animalia
- Phylum: Mollusca
- Class: Gastropoda
- Subclass: Caenogastropoda
- Order: Neogastropoda
- Superfamily: Conoidea
- Family: Raphitomidae
- Genus: Daphnella
- Species: D. capensis

Binomial name
- Daphnella capensis (G.B. Sowerby III, 1892)

Synonyms
- Columbella capensis G.B. Sowerby III, 1892 (original combination); Daphnella alfredensis Bartsch, 1915

= Daphnella capensis =

Species of gastropod

Daphnella capensis is a species of sea snail, a marine gastropod mollusk in the family Raphitomidae.

The species is not to be confused with Daphnella capensis (E. A. Smith, 1882), a synonym of Tritonoturris capensis (E. A. Smith, 1882).

== Description ==
The length of the shell reaches 10 mm, while its diameter reaches 5 mm.

The small, white shell has a fusiform shape. The spire is acute with a papillary apex. The shell contains 5½ slightly convex whorls with many longitudinal ribs crossed by narrow spiral lirations. The body whorl is inflated. The columella is slightly twisted and not callous. The aperture is wide. The sharp outer lip is arcuate.

== Distribution ==
This marine species occurs off Port Elizabeth, South Africa.
