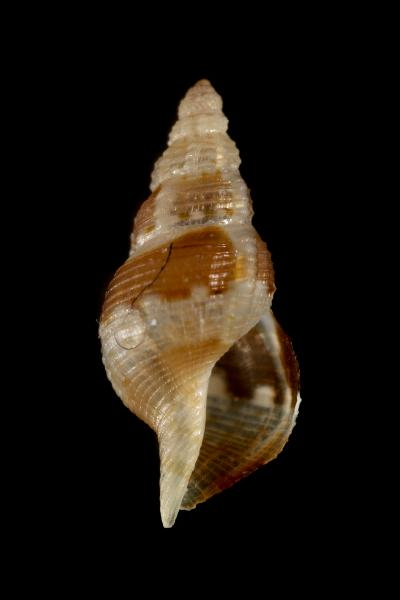
- Shell of Tritonoturris lifouana (specimen at MNHN, Paris)

Scientific classification
- Kingdom: Animalia
- Phylum: Mollusca
- Class: Gastropoda
- Subclass: Caenogastropoda
- Order: Neogastropoda
- Superfamily: Conoidea
- Family: Raphitomidae
- Genus: Tritonoturris; Dall, 1924

Type species
- Clathurella robillardi H. Adams, 1869

Species
- See text

= Tritonoturris =

Genus of gastropods

Tritonoturris is a genus of sea snails, marine gastropod mollusks in the family Raphitomidae.

== Species ==
Species within the genus Tritonoturris include:

- Tritonoturris amabilis (Hinds, 1843)
- Tritonoturris capensis (Smith E. A., 1882)
- Tritonoturris cumingii (Powys, 1835)
- Tritonoturris difficilis Stahlschmidt, Poppe & Tagaro, 2018
- Tritonoturris homologis Stahlschmidt, Chino & E. Tardy, 2022
- Tritonoturris macandrewi (Smith E. A., 1882)
- Tritonoturris menecharmes (Melvill, 1923)
- Tritonoturris obesa Kilburn, 1977
- Tritonoturris oxyclathrus (Martens, 1880)
- * Tritonoturris phaula Kilburn, 1977
- Tritonoturris philliffgrieffi Wiedrick, 2025
- Tritonoturris poppei Vera-Pelaez & Vega-Luz, 1999
- Tritonoturris pseudomenecharmes Wiedrick, 2025
- Tritonoturris scalaris (Hinds, 1843)
- Tritonoturris secta (Sowerby, G.B. II, 1870)
- Tritonoturris sottoae Stahlschmidt, Poppe & Tagaro, 2018

Species brought into synonymy

- Tritonoturris albocingulata Stahlschmidt, Chino & E. Tardy, 2022: synonym of Lenisdaphnella albocingulata (Stahlschmidt, Chino & E. Tardy, 2022) (incorrect grammatical agreement of specific epithet)
- Tritonoturris buccinoides Shuto, 1983: synonym of Pleurotomella buccinoides (Shuto, 1983) (original combination)
- Tritonoturris concinnus Li & Li, 2007: synonym of Tritonoturris scalaris (Hinds, 1843)
- Tritonoturris elegans (Pease, 1860): synonym of Tritonoturris amabilis (Hinds, 1843)
- Tritonoturris harpa Pease, 1860: synonym of Tritonoturris cumingii (Powys, 1835)
- Tritonoturris lifouana (Hervier, 1897) : synonym of Asperdaphne paucicostata (Pease, 1860) (superseded combination)

Tritonoturris paucicosta]] (Pease, 1860): synonym of Asperdaphne paucicostata (Pease, 1860) (superseded combination)

- Tritonoturris phanula Kilburn, 1977 : synonym of Tritonoturris phaula Kilburn, 1977
- Tritonoturris robillardi (H. Adams, 1869): synonym of Tritonoturris amabilis (Hinds, 1843)
- Tritonoturris subrissoides (Hervier, 1897): synonym of Asperdaphne subrissoides (Hervier, 1897)
- Tritonoturris tritonoides Reeve, 1843: synonym of Tritonoturris cumingii (Powys, 1835)
