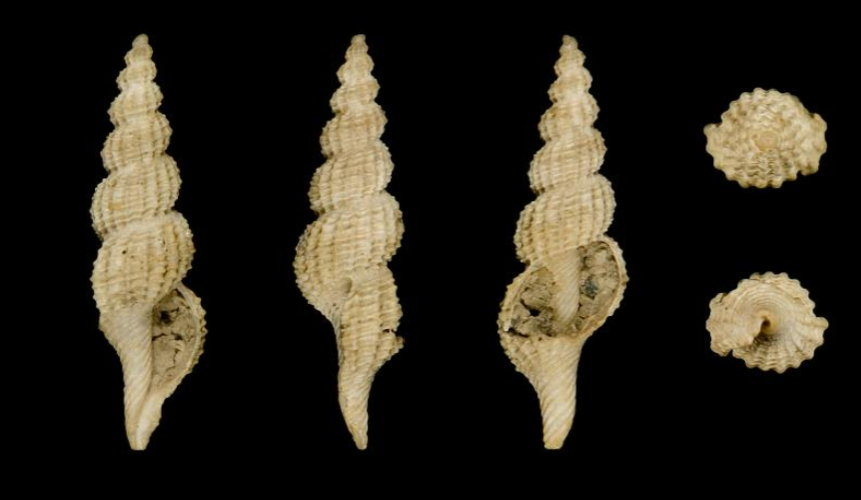
- Shell of Veprecula pungens (holotype at the Smithsonian Institution)

Scientific classification
- Kingdom: Animalia
- Phylum: Mollusca
- Class: Gastropoda
- Subclass: Caenogastropoda
- Order: Neogastropoda
- Superfamily: Conoidea
- Family: Raphitomidae
- Genus: Veprecula
- Species: V. pungens

Binomial name
- Veprecula pungens (Gould, 1860)

Synonyms
- Clavatula pungens Gould, 1860; Pleurotoma (Defrancia) asperulata E. A. Smith, 1882; Pleurotoma aesara Dall, 1918; Pleurotoma asperulata E. A. Smith, 1882 (invamid: junior homonym of Pleurotoma asperulata Lamarck, 1822; Pleurotoma aesara Dall, 1918, is a replacement name)

= Veprecula pungens =

Species of gastropod

Veprecula pungens is a species of sea snail, a marine gastropod mollusk in the family Raphitomidae.

== Description ==
The length of the shell attains 9 mm.

This species partakes of the general aspect of Veprecula arethusa but is distinguishable from it by its longer spire, narrower form, closer reticulation, and smooth apical whorls.

== Distribution ==
This marine species was found off Hong Kong.
