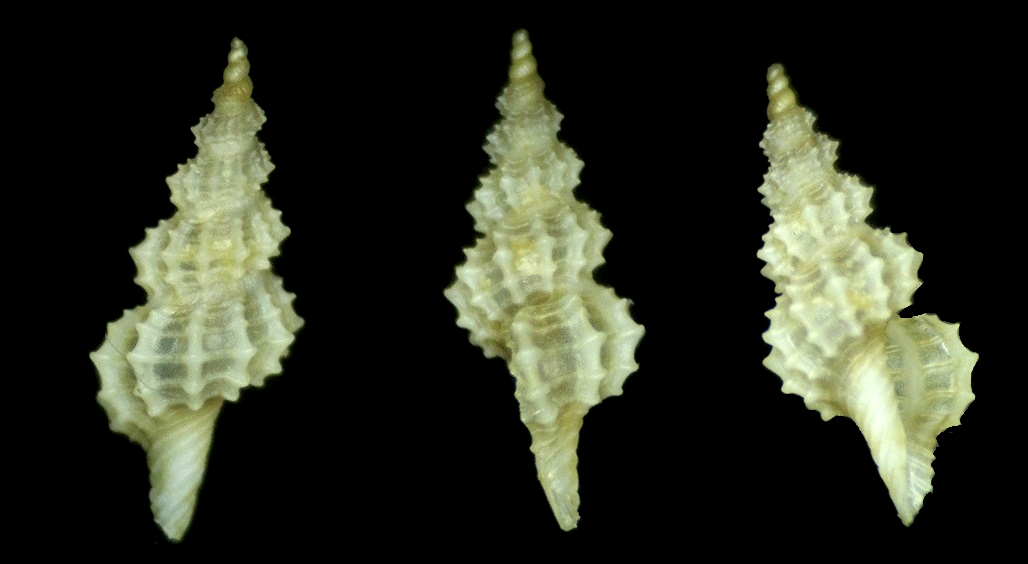
- Shell of Veprecula echinulata

Scientific classification
- Kingdom: Animalia
- Phylum: Mollusca
- Class: Gastropoda
- Subclass: Caenogastropoda
- Order: Neogastropoda
- Superfamily: Conoidea
- Family: Raphitomidae
- Genus: Veprecula
- Species: V. echinulata

Binomial name
- Veprecula echinulata (Thiele, 1925)

Synonyms
- Clathurella echinulata Thiele, 1925

= Veprecula echinulata =

Species of gastropod

Veprecula echinulata is a species of sea snail, a marine gastropod mollusk in the family Raphitomidae.

This is not Veprecula echinulata Springsteen & Leobrera, 1986 (this is probably Veprecula vepratica)

== Description ==
The length of the shell varies between 3.5 mm and 12 mm.

== Distribution ==
This marine species occurs off the Zanzibar Channel (Tanzania) and Easter Island.
