= Rimosodaphnella angulata =

Scientific classification
- Kingdom: Animalia
- Phylum: Mollusca
- Class: Gastropoda
- Subclass: Caenogastropoda
- Order: Neogastropoda
- Superfamily: Conoidea
- Family: Raphitomidae
- Genus: Rimosodaphnella
- Species: R. angulata

Binomial name
- Rimosodaphnella angulata (Habe & Masuda, 1990)

Synonyms
- Daphnella angulata Habe & Masuda, 1990

Species of gastropod

Rimosodaphnella angulata is a species of sea snail, a marine gastropod mollusk in the family Raphitomidae.

The original combination is a junior homonym of † Daphnella (Raphitoma) angulata Peyrot, 1938

The authorship of this species has been erroneously attributed to Kuroda, 1958 by Chen-Kwoh Chang in 2001.

== Description ==
The length of the shell reaches 30 mm.

== Distribution ==
This marine species occurs off the Pacific coast of central Honshu, Japan and off Taiwan.
