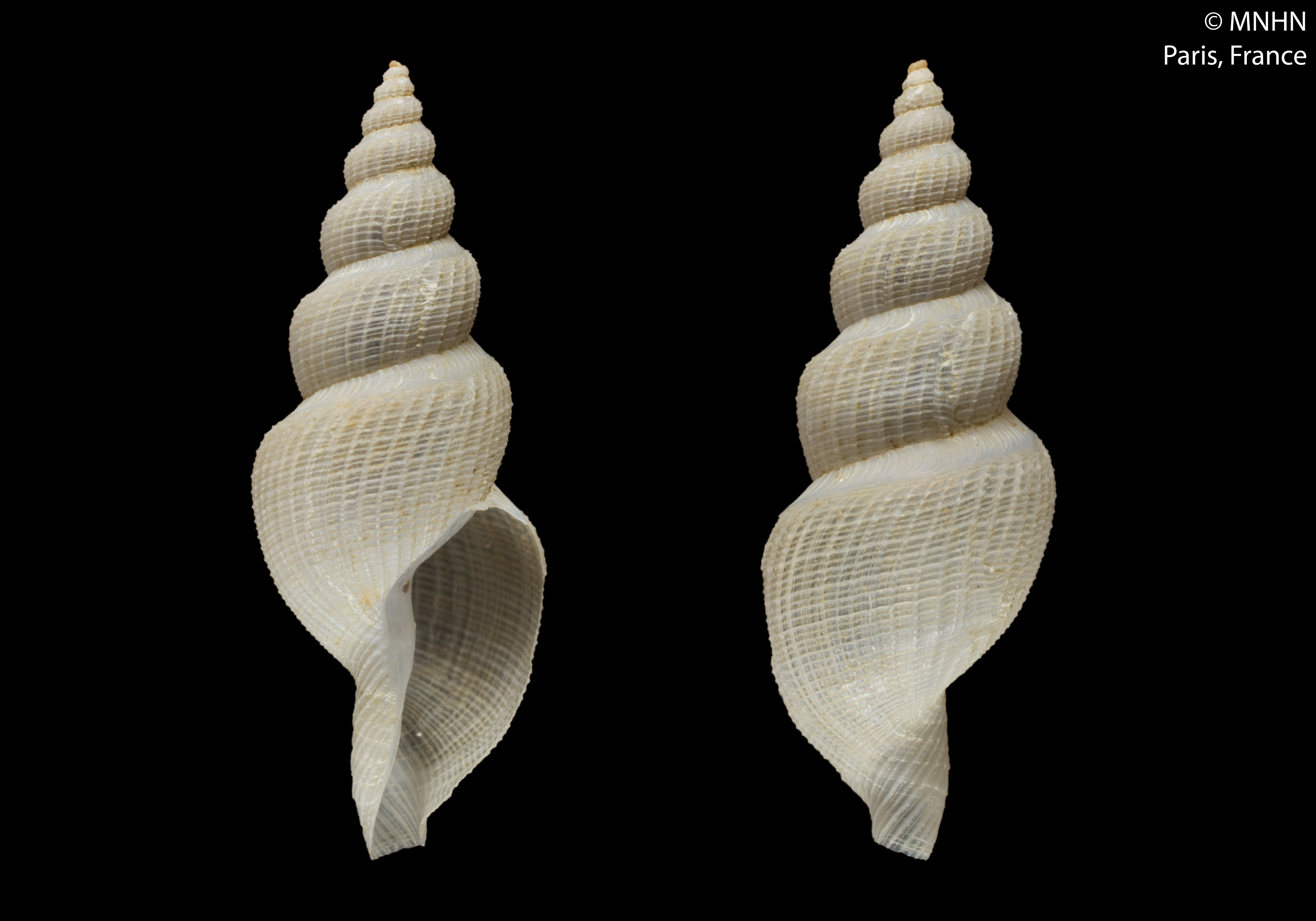
- Shell of Veprecula bandensis (holotype at MNHN, Paris)

Scientific classification
- Kingdom: Animalia
- Phylum: Mollusca
- Class: Gastropoda
- Subclass: Caenogastropoda
- Order: Neogastropoda
- Superfamily: Conoidea
- Family: Raphitomidae
- Genus: Veprecula
- Species: V. bandensis

Binomial name
- Veprecula bandensis Sysoev, 1997

= Veprecula bandensis =

Species of gastropod

Veprecula bandensis is a species of sea snail, a marine gastropod mollusk in the family Raphitomidae.

== Diagnosis ==
The original diagnosis of the new specimen as written by Dr. Alexander Victorovich Sysoev:

Shell large for genus, 21 mm high, very thin and fragile, slender, with high spire. Protoconch multispiral with oblique axial ribs. Teleoconch whorls weakly angulate at shoulder, narrow, weakly concave subsutural ramp with regular fold-like scars of anal sinus. Sculpture finely reticulate, of numerous thin axial riblets and thin strong spiral cords, interspaces spirally elongate. Canal moderately long, slightly twisted and obliquely truncated. Anal sinus deep, deepest point in adapical part of ramp. Colour white.

== Description ==
The original description of the collected specimen as written by Dr. Alexander Victorovich Sysoev:

Shell very thin and fragile, slender, fusiform, with high spire comprising 37% of total shell height. Protoconch I and tip of multispiral protoconch II dissolved, only last whorl remaining, convex, sculptured by strong, coarse, prosocline axial ribs; protoconch/teleoconch discontinuity sharp. Teleoconch consisting of 7.0 whorls, suture tightly impressed, whorls weakly angulate at shoulder, evenly convex below shoulder. Subsutural ramp narrow, weakly concave, without spiral sculpture, with numerous regular, raised, opisthocyrt wrinkles corresponding to scars of anal sinus. Sides finely reticulately sculptured by numerous (42 on last whorl), prosocyrt, sharply defined, narrow axial riblets overridden by almost equally strong but narrower spiral cords, interspaces spirally very elongate, intersection of cords and riblets spirally elongate; 3 spiral cords on first teleoconch whorl, additional cords added at shoulder and between cords, reaching 20 on penultimate whorl, 35 on periphery and base of last whorl, plus 13, slightly stronger, on canal. Base evenly connected to moderately long, twisted, and obliquely truncated canal. Aperture pyriform. Inner lip strongly concave on abapical part of parietal side, covered by thin, translucent, axially wrinkled callus. Outer lip damaged, anal sinus (based on incremental scars) deep, deepest point in adapical part of ramp. Colour of protoconch deep brown, of teleoconch semi-transparent white with thin, tightly adhering beige periostracum.

The dimensions of the shell are as follows: height 21.2 mm, diameter 7.7mm, last whorl height 13.2mm, aperture height 10.2.

== Remarks ==
The original remarks about the collected specimen as written by Dr. Alexander Victorovich Sysoev:

Veprecula bandensis can be included in Veprecula on the basis of shell outline, reticulate sculpture, and characteristic sculpture of protoconch. It is most similar to the type species, V. sykesi, but differs in having a much larger shell with lower spire, fainter sculpture, twisted canal, and poorly prominent intersection of axial and spiral sculpture. Other known species of the genus have a much stronger sculpture, consisting of widely spaced ribs and cords. The new species is also similar to Daphnella thia Melvill & Standen, 1903 (the original figure of that species is rather inadequate, but it was recently illustrated by BOSCH et al., 1995: 167) in shell outline and sculpture, but differs in having more curved ribs, a well differentiated subsutural ramp, and different protoconch sculpture.

== Discovery ==
Veprecula bandensis was discovered in 1991 during the Franco-Indonesian Karubar Campaign. It was located around the Kai Islands at exactly 5° 13' 59.9988'' S; 133° 0' 0'' E at a depth between 688 and 694 meters in the Banda Sea. The collected specimen was later studied and analyzed in 1997 by Dr. Alexander Victorovich Sysoev in the publication "Mollusca Gastropoda: New deep-water turrid gastropods (Conoidea) from eastern Indonesia" within the Mémoires du Muséum national d'Histoire naturelle.

== Etymology ==
The genus name Veprecula is derived from the Latin word "veprēs" meaning "thorn" or "brier", which possibly refers to the coarse texture and sharp protoconch of the shell. The Latin Suffix "-cula" means "small" or "tiny". The Species name Bandensis is derived from the prefix "Band" which refers to the Banda Sea, the place in which the specimen was found. The Latin suffix "ensis" means "pertaining to," or "originating in".

The combined meaning of these words could refer to the specimen as a "tiny thorn from the Banda Sea."
