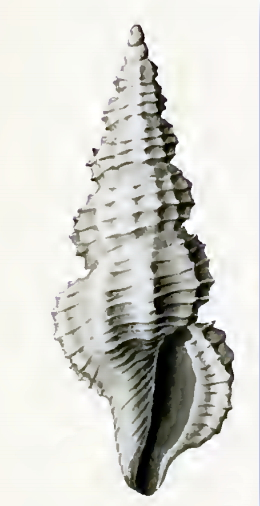
- Original imaga of a shell of Veprecula vacillata

Scientific classification
- Kingdom: Animalia
- Phylum: Mollusca
- Class: Gastropoda
- Subclass: Caenogastropoda
- Order: Neogastropoda
- Superfamily: Conoidea
- Family: Raphitomidae
- Genus: Veprecula
- Species: V. vacillata

Binomial name
- Veprecula vacillata Hedley, 1922

= Veprecula vacillata =

Species of gastropod

Veprecula vacillata is a species of sea snail, a marine gastropod mollusk in the family Raphitomidae.

Subspecies: Veprecula vacillata paucicostata Hedley, 1922

== Description ==
The length of the shell attains 5.5 mm, its diameter 2 mm.

(Original description) The small, acuminate shell is excavate at the base and below the suture. Its colour is buff, sometimes suffused with chocolate.

An acicular protoconch of three whorls is followed by five adult whorls.

Sculpture: Deep square meshes are enclosed by radial and spiral cords, with small prickles at the point of intersection. Both the radials and the spirals vary in their development. On the body whorl there may be from nine to twelve radials, and from fifteen to eighteen spirals. On the upper whorl there are from three to five spirals, the peripheral one dominating.

Aperture :—The anal sulcus is sutural and rather deep. The outer lip is dentate by the projection of the spirals. The siphonal canal is rather long and straight.

== Distribution ==
This marine species is endemic to Australia and occurs off Queensland and in the Gulf of Carpentaria.
