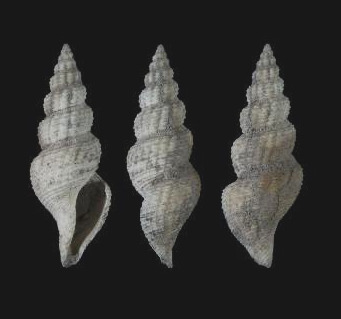
- Shell of Rimosodaphnella textilis (specimen at MNHN, Paris)

Scientific classification
- Kingdom: Animalia
- Phylum: Mollusca
- Class: Gastropoda
- Subclass: Caenogastropoda
- Order: Neogastropoda
- Superfamily: Conoidea
- Family: Raphitomidae
- Genus: Rimosodaphnella
- Species: R. textilis

Binomial name
- Rimosodaphnella textilis Brocchi, 1814

Synonyms
- † Daphnella (Bellardiella) textilis (Brocchi, 1814); † Daphnella (Rimosodaphnella) textilis (Brocchi, 1814); Defrancia textilis De Koen., 1872; † Homotoma textilis (Brocchi, 1814); † Mangelia textilis Forest., 1868; † Murex (Fusus) textile Brocchi, 1814 (original combination); † Pleurotoma textilis Bronn, 1831; † Raphitoma textilis (Brocchi, 1814)

= Rimosodaphnella textilis =

Extinct species of gastropod

Rimosodaphnella textilis is an extinct species of sea snail, a marine gastropod mollusk in the family Raphitomidae.

== Description ==
The shell reaches a length of 16 mm, its diameter of 5.5 mm.The shell is subulately turreted, longitudinally ribbed and transversely exquisitely striated, The whorls are smooth, canaliculate above, crossed by lunulate threads. The siphonal canal is elongate and recurved.

This is an elegant shell, whose surface imitates a very fine reticulation, by weaving the longitudinal ribs with the transverse striae which are very numerous. In larger individuals the first are not very apparent because of the depth of the grooves and the height of the striae that inintersect. The whorls are convex and rounded, and they show above, around the suture, a small canal, marked by arched lines coming from the growth lines of the shell. The base is narrow, elongated and somewhat recurved.

== Distribution ==
Fossils of this species were found in Pliocene strata in the Alpes-Maritimes, France and Italy; age range: 3.6 to 2.588 Ma
