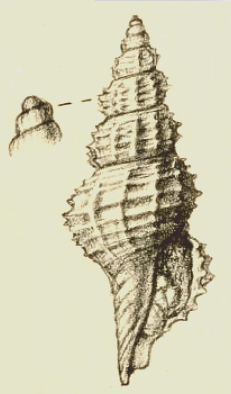
- Shell and protoconch of Veprecula hedleyi

Scientific classification
- Kingdom: Animalia
- Phylum: Mollusca
- Class: Gastropoda
- Subclass: Caenogastropoda
- Order: Neogastropoda
- Superfamily: Conoidea
- Family: Raphitomidae
- Genus: Veprecula
- Species: V. hedleyi

Binomial name
- Veprecula hedleyi (Melvill, 1904)

Synonyms
- Clathurella hedleyi Melvill, 1904

= Veprecula hedleyi =

Species of gastropod

Veprecula hedleyi is a species of sea snail, a marine gastropod mollusk in the family Raphitomidae.

== Description ==
The length of the shell attains 3 mm.

This species differs from its congeners in its greater ventricosity and roundness of the whorl. The number of longitudinal ribs on the body whorl is sixteen in the specimen figured. The spiral acute lirations are also more frequent than obtain in Veprecula sykesii or Veprecula vepratica. The four apical whorls are microscopically longitudinally costellate. The holotype possesses a greater number of ribs than obtained in the more recently collected examples, but the author cannot further separate them specifically.

== Distribution ==
This species occurs in the Gulf of Oman and Réunion.
