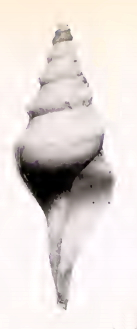
- Original image of a shell of Famelica monotropis

Scientific classification
- Kingdom: Animalia
- Phylum: Mollusca
- Class: Gastropoda
- Subclass: Caenogastropoda
- Order: Neogastropoda
- Superfamily: Conoidea
- Family: Raphitomidae
- Genus: Famelica
- Species: F. monotropis

Binomial name
- Famelica monotropis (Dautzenberg & Fischer, 1896)

Synonyms
- Pleurotoma monotropis Dautzenberg & Fischer, 1896

= Famelica monotropis =

Species of gastropod

Famelica monotropis is a species of sea snail, a marine gastropod mollusk in the family Raphitomidae.

== Description ==
The length of the shell attains 9.3 mm, its diameter 3.3 mm.

The thin, white, subhyaline shell has a fusiform shape and a turreted spire with an acuminate apex. It contains eight whorls. The suture is impressed. The keel is protruding and sharp. The subsutural band coincides with the rest of the surface. The growth lines are barely perceptible. One can notice with a lens on the body whorl, below the keel, two obsolete decurrent threads. The aperture is oblong. The wide siphonal canal is very long. The narrow columella stands upright and is very sharp at the base. It shows a very thin callus. The outer lip is thin and sharp.

== Distribution ==
This marine species occurs off the Azores.
