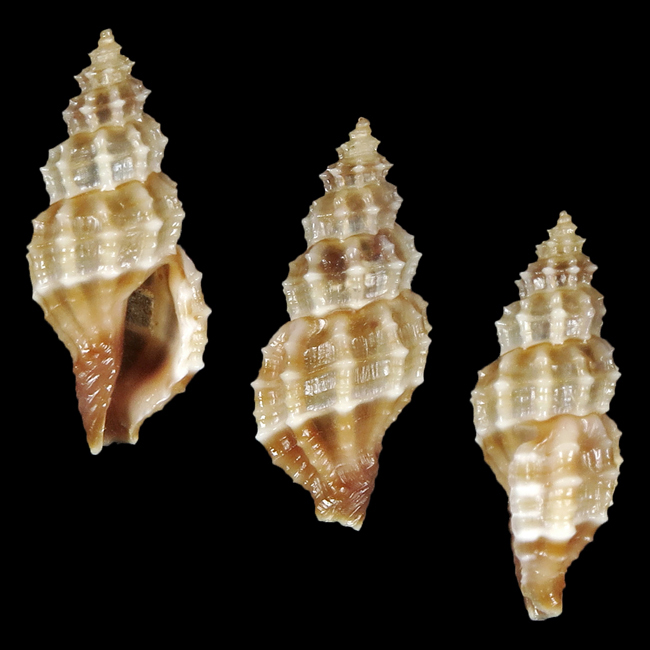
- Shell of Tritonoturris sottoae (specimen at MNHN, Paris)

Scientific classification
- Kingdom: Animalia
- Phylum: Mollusca
- Class: Gastropoda
- Subclass: Caenogastropoda
- Order: Neogastropoda
- Superfamily: Conoidea
- Family: Raphitomidae
- Genus: Tritonoturris
- Species: T. sottoae

Binomial name
- Tritonoturris sottoae Stahlschmidt, Poppe & Tagaro, 2018

= Tritonoturris sottoae =

Species of gastropod

Tritonoturris sottoae is a species of sea snail, a marine gastropod mollusk in the family Raphitomidae.

== Description ==
The length of the shell varies between 7.5 mm and 13 mm.

== Distribution ==
This marine species occurs off Mactan Island, Cebu, Philippines
