= Famelica bitrudis =

Scientific classification
- Kingdom: Animalia
- Phylum: Mollusca
- Class: Gastropoda
- Subclass: Caenogastropoda
- Order: Neogastropoda
- Superfamily: Conoidea
- Family: Raphitomidae
- Genus: Famelica
- Species: F. bitrudis

Binomial name
- Famelica bitrudis (Barnard, 1963)

Synonyms
- Daphnella bitrudis Barnard, 1963

Species of gastropod

Famelica bitrudis is a species of sea snail, a marine gastropod mollusk in the family Raphitomidae.

== Description ==
The length of the shell attains 15.2 mm, its diameter is 3.4 mm.

== Distribution ==
This marine species occurs off South Africa.
