= Veprecula crystallina =

Scientific classification
- Kingdom: Animalia
- Phylum: Mollusca
- Class: Gastropoda
- Subclass: Caenogastropoda
- Order: Neogastropoda
- Superfamily: Conoidea
- Family: Raphitomidae
- Genus: Veprecula
- Species: V. crystallina

Binomial name
- Veprecula crystallina Stahlschmidt, Chino & Kilburn, 2012

Species of gastropod

Veprecula crystallina is a species of sea snail, a marine gastropod mollusk in the family Raphitomidae.

== Description ==
The length of the shell varies between 6 mm and 9 mm.

== Distribution ==
This marine species occurs off the Philippines
