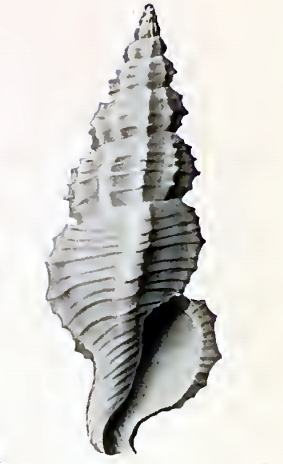
- Original image of a shell of Veprecula scala

Scientific classification
- Kingdom: Animalia
- Phylum: Mollusca
- Class: Gastropoda
- Subclass: Caenogastropoda
- Order: Neogastropoda
- Superfamily: Conoidea
- Family: Raphitomidae
- Genus: Veprecula
- Species: V. scala

Binomial name
- Veprecula scala Hedley, 1922

= Veprecula scala =

Species of Gastropoda

Veprecula scala is a species of sea snail, a marine gastropod mollusk in the family Raphitomidae.

== Description ==
The length of the shell attains 5.5 mm, its diameter 2 mm.

(Original description) The slender, fusiform shell is excavate at the base and below the suture. Its colour is burnt sienna, with a cream zone on the shoulder of the body whorl.

A tall and narrow protoconch contains four whorls, delicately radially ribbed. it is followed by five adult whorls.

Sculpture: Spaced spiral cords over-run the ribs and form small scales on their summits, four on the penultimate, then three and two on earlier whorls. On the body whorl they extend to the tip of the snout, and number about sixteen. The radial ribs are closely packed above, and are more spaced as they descend. On the body whorl they decrease to six in number, and are narrow, erect, and oblique. They vanish on the base. The siphonal canal is produced, and a little twisted. The anal sulcus is sutural, rather deep and narrow.

== Distribution ==
This marine species is endemic to Australia and occurs off Queensland and the Gulf of Carpentaria.
