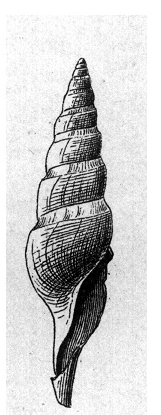
- Shell of Famelica scipio

Scientific classification
- Kingdom: Animalia
- Phylum: Mollusca
- Class: Gastropoda
- Subclass: Caenogastropoda
- Order: Neogastropoda
- Superfamily: Conoidea
- Family: Raphitomidae
- Genus: Famelica; Bouchet & Waren, 1980

Type species
- Pleurotoma catharinae Verrill & S. Smith, 1884

Species
- See text

= Famelica =

Genus of gastropods

Famelica is a genus of sea snails, marine gastropod mollusks in the family Raphitomidae.

== Species ==
Species within the genus Famelica include:

- Famelica acus Criscione, Hallan, Puillandre & Fedosov, 2021
- Famelica babelica Chino & Stahlschmidt, 2021
- Famelica bitrudis (Barnard, 1963)
- Famelica catharinae (Verrill & Smith, 1884)
- Famelica leucospira Abbate, P. O. V. Lima & Simone, 2022
- Famelica mirmidina (Dautzenberg & Fischer, 1896)
- Famelica monoceros (Watson, 1881)
- Famelica monotropis (Dautzenberg & Fischer, 1896)
- Famelica nitida Sysoev, 1990
- Famelica pacifica Sysoev & Kantor, 1987
- Famelica polyacantha (Stahlschmidt, Chino & Kilburn, 2012)
- Famelica pukua Abbate, P. O. V. Lima & Simone, 2022
- Famelica scipio (Dall, 1889)
- Famelica tajourensis Sysoev & Kantor, 1987
- Famelica tasmanica Sysoev & Kantor, 1987
- Famelica turritelloides Criscione, Hallan, Puillandre & Fedosov, 2021

Species brought into synonymy

- Famelica ischna Dall, 1927: synonym of Famelica monoceros (Watson, 1881)
