= Famelica nitida =

Scientific classification
- Kingdom: Animalia
- Phylum: Mollusca
- Class: Gastropoda
- Subclass: Caenogastropoda
- Order: Neogastropoda
- Superfamily: Conoidea
- Family: Raphitomidae
- Genus: Famelica
- Species: F. nitida

Binomial name
- Famelica nitida Sysoev, 1990

Species of gastropod

Famelica nitida is a species of sea snail, a marine gastropod mollusk in the family Raphitomidae.

== Distribution ==
This bathyal species was found on the Naska & Sala-y-Gomes Ridges, Southeast Pacific
