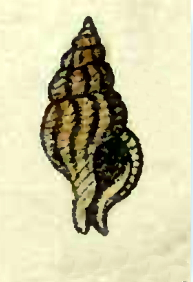
- Shell of Tritonoturris scalaris

Scientific classification
- Kingdom: Animalia
- Phylum: Mollusca
- Class: Gastropoda
- Subclass: Caenogastropoda
- Order: Neogastropoda
- Superfamily: Conoidea
- Family: Raphitomidae
- Genus: Tritonoturris
- Species: T. scalaris

Binomial name
- Tritonoturris scalaris (Hinds, 1843)

Synonyms
- Clathurella scalaris Tryon, 1884; Clavatula scalaris Hinds, 1843 (original combination); Pleurotoma scalaris Reeve, 1845; Tritonoturris concinnus B.-Q. Li & X.-Z. Li, 2007

= Tritonoturris scalaris =

Species of gastropod

Tritonoturris scalaris is a species of sea snail, a marine gastropod mollusk in the family Raphitomidae.

This species was placed in this genus in 2010 by Baoquan Li, Xinzheng Li, and Richard N. Kilburn.

== Description ==
The length of the shell varies between 12 mm and 17 mm.

The ribs are rounded, running into the suture, like the lamellae of Scalaria, closely transversely striate. The whorls are convex, with well-impressed sutures. The color of the shell is light yellowish brown, with a narrow indistinct chestnut zone below the middle of the body whorl.

== Distribution ==
This marine species occurs in the South China Sea and off Western Thailand to Indonesia
