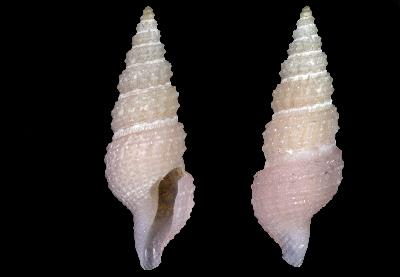
- Shell of Rimosodaphnella tenuipurpurata (paratype at MNHN, Paris)

Scientific classification
- Kingdom: Animalia
- Phylum: Mollusca
- Class: Gastropoda
- Subclass: Caenogastropoda
- Order: Neogastropoda
- Superfamily: Conoidea
- Family: Raphitomidae
- Genus: Rimosodaphnella
- Species: R. tenuipurpurata

Binomial name
- Rimosodaphnella tenuipurpurata Bonfitto & Morassi, 2013

= Rimosodaphnella tenuipurpurata =

Species of gastropod

Rimosodaphnella tenuipurpurata is a species of sea snail, a marine gastropod mollusk in the family Raphitomidae.

== Description ==
The length of the shell varies between 6 mm and 10 mm. They undergo sexual reproduction. They move with the help of mucus mediated gliding. They are predators.

== Distribution ==
This marine species occurs off Cebu Island, Cebu, Philippines.
