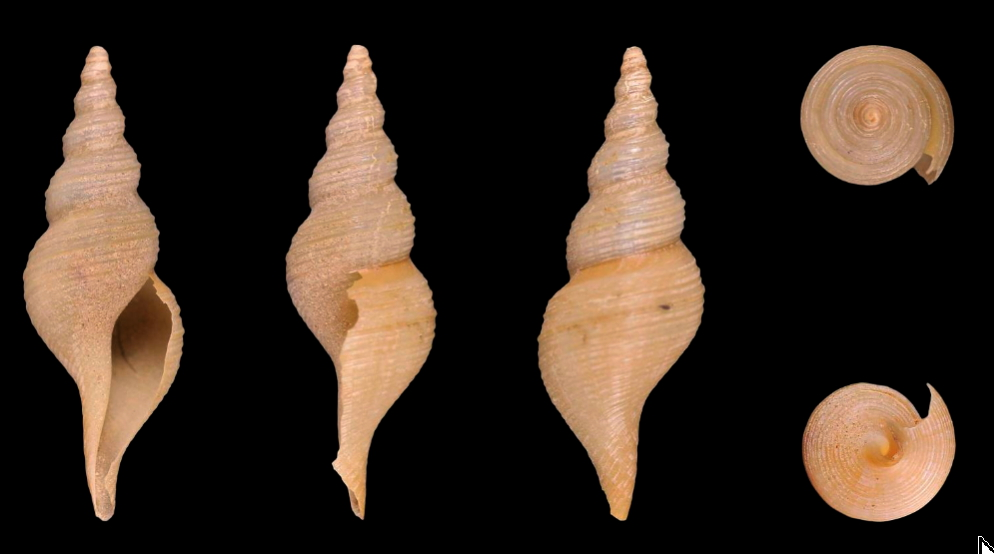
- Shell and protoconch of Famelica catharinae (holotype at the Smithsonian Institution)

Scientific classification
- Kingdom: Animalia
- Phylum: Mollusca
- Class: Gastropoda
- Subclass: Caenogastropoda
- Order: Neogastropoda
- Superfamily: Conoidea
- Family: Raphitomidae
- Genus: Famelica
- Species: F. catharinae

Binomial name
- Famelica catharinae (Verrill & S. Smith [in Verrill], 1884)

Synonyms
- Pleurotoma catharinae Verrill & S. Smith, 1884; Pleurotomella catharinae Verrill & S. Smith, 1884 (original combination)

= Famelica catharinae =

Species of gastropod

Famelica catharinae is a species of sea snail, a marine gastropod mollusk in the family Raphitomidae.

The species was named for Katharine J. Bush, an American malacologist.

== Description ==
The length of the shell attains 23 mm, its diameter 6.5 mm.

(Original description) The thin, white shell is translucent. It is very slender, elongated, narrow, fusiform, with a long, narrow, tapered, nearly straight siphonal canal, and a tall, gradually tapered, acute spire. It contains eight, evenly rounded whorls. but not very convex, with a distinct, flattened, smooth subsutural band. The suture is well marked, but not deep, decidedly oblique. The surface is everywhere covered with conspicuous, regular, raised, revolving cinguli, in some parts with one or more smaller revolving lines in the spaces between them. The cinguli are obtusely rounded and entirely smooth, as well as the spaces between them, which are of about the same breadth. On the penultimate whorl there are about fifteen cinguli, and on the upper whorls five or six. The large, acute, brown protoconch consists of about 4½ whorls, which increase regularly. The apical whorl is small, rounded and prominent. The others are distinctly carinated and shouldered. The portion above the shoulder slopes at a wide angle and is a little convex and nearly smooth, except close to the carina. The part below the carina of the shoulder is flattened and nearly straight, or even narrowed toward the suture, and crossed by regularly spaced, thin, elevated transverse ribs, with wider intervals. These ribs extend a little above the carina and then fade out. They run nearly straight across all the whorls, except the first two, where they are more or less oblique. There is usually, on the larger whorls, a raised revolving line, or small carina, just above the suture. The aperture is very elongated and narrowed at the base of the siphonal canal, which is much prolonged and slender, a little curved, owing to a slight sinuous curvature of the columella-margin. The posterior notch in the outer lip is rather deep and narrow, situated immediately at the suture. The subsutural band, corresponding to it, shows faint cm'ved lines of growth, parallel with its margin. The color of the shell is white, except the protoconch, which is pale chestnut-brown.

== Distribution ==
F. catharinae can be found in Atlantic waters, ranging from the coast of Massachusetts south to Florida.
