= Rimosodaphnella semicolon =

Scientific classification
- Kingdom: Animalia
- Phylum: Mollusca
- Class: Gastropoda
- Subclass: Caenogastropoda
- Order: Neogastropoda
- Superfamily: Conoidea
- Family: Raphitomidae
- Genus: Rimosodaphnella
- Species: R. semicolon

Binomial name
- Rimosodaphnella semicolon (S.V. Wood, 1842)

Synonyms
- † Asthenotoma (Asthenotoma) bipunctula (S. V. Wood, 1879); † Oligotoma bipunctula Harmer, 1915; † Pleurotoma bipunctula S.V. Wood, 1842

Extinct species of gastropod

Rimosodaphnella semicolon is an extinct species of sea snail, a marine gastropod mollusk in the family Raphitomidae.

== Distribution ==
Fossils of this species were found in the Coralline Crag and Red Crag, Sutton, GB
