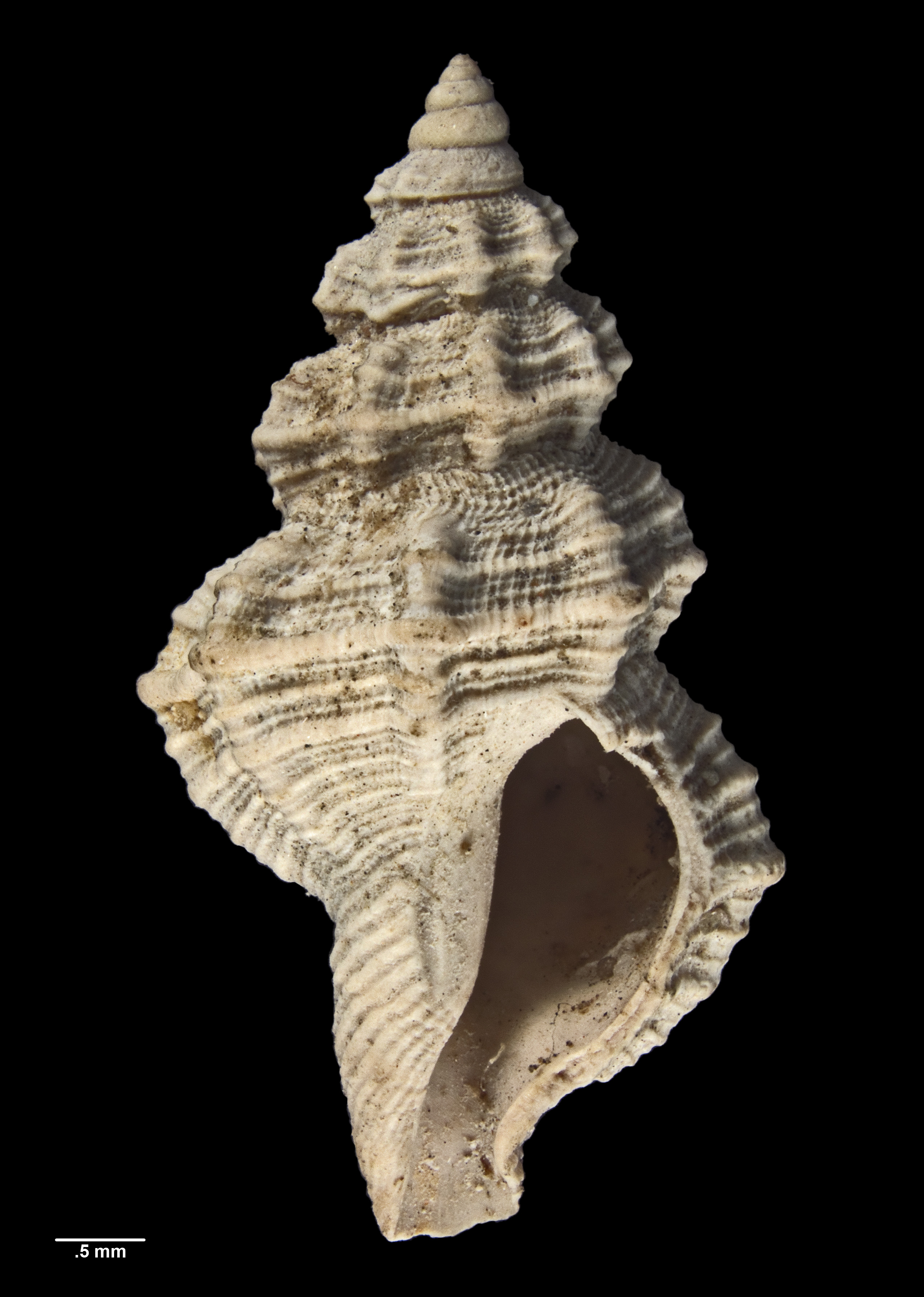
- Holotype from Auckland War Memorial Museum

Scientific classification
- Kingdom: Animalia
- Phylum: Mollusca
- Class: Gastropoda
- Subclass: Caenogastropoda
- Order: Neogastropoda
- Family: Raphitomidae
- Genus: Veprecula
- Species: †V. adelaidensis

Binomial name
- †Veprecula adelaidensis Powell, 1944

= Veprecula adelaidensis =

Veprecula adelaidensis Temporal range: Middle Miocene

Extinct species of gastropod

Veprecula adelaidensis is an extinct species of sea snail, a marine gastropod mollusc in the family Raphitomidae. Fossils of the species date to the middle Miocene, and have been found in strata of the St Vincent Basin of South Australia.

== Description ==
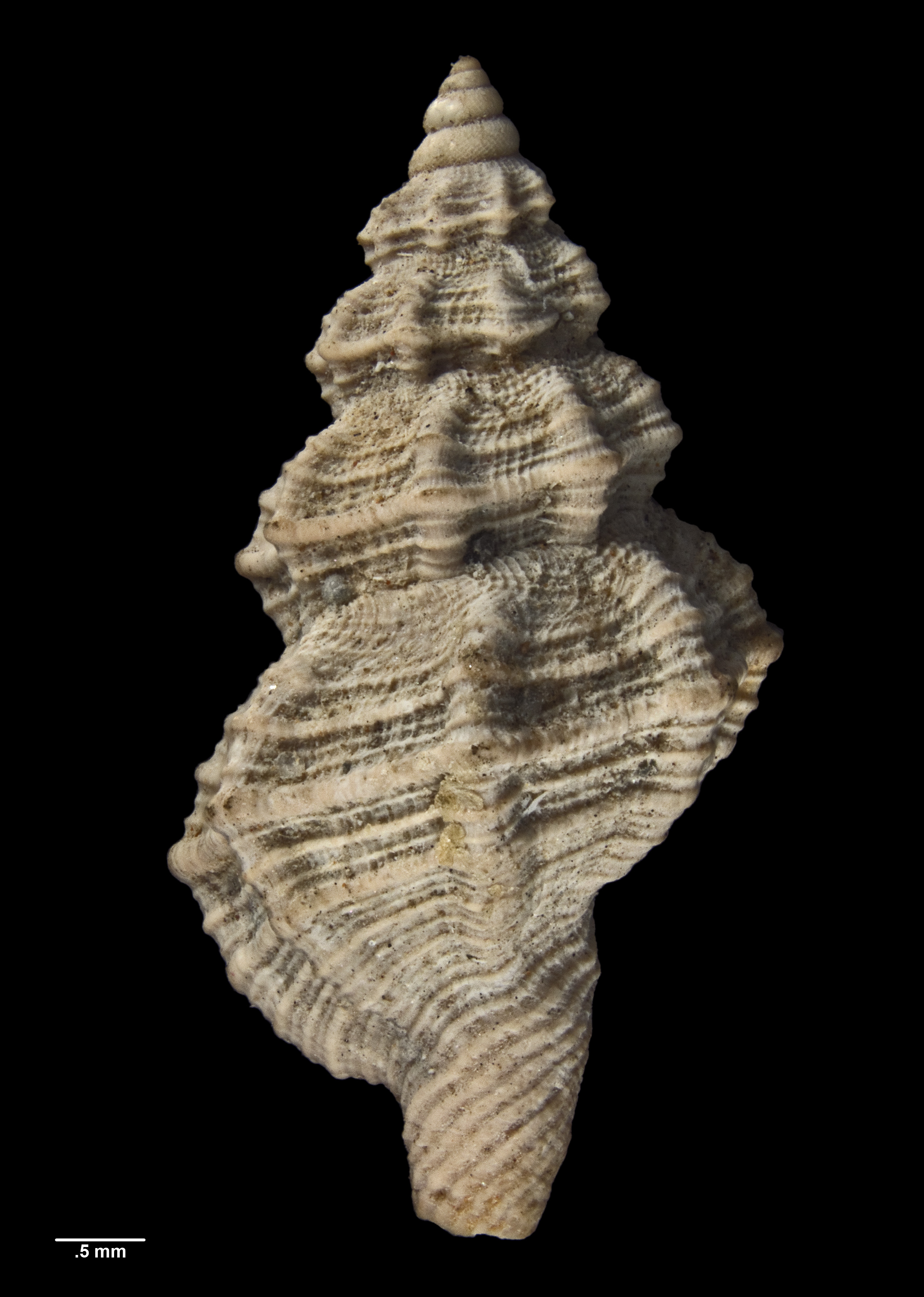
Reverse view of holotype

In the original description, Powell described the species as follows:

Shell small, broadly fusiform, sculptured with heavy rounded axials crossed by a few strong cords. Surface cancellated by subsidiary spiral and axial threads. There are four primary spirals on the spire-whorls. The third one down is much the strongest and forms the peripheral carina at one third whorl height. About 21 primary spirals on body-whorl, 11 of them linear-spaced on the neck; four subsidiary threads on the shoulder and one or two in the interspaces of the primaries. Axials very heavy, rounded, strongly projecting, vertical, 8 per whorl. The sinus is shaped as in Veprecula, although not so deep, but it is deeper than in Asperdaphne.

The holotype of the species measures 6.7 mm (0.26 in) in height and 3.5 mm (0.14 in) in diameter.

== Taxonomy ==
The species was first described by A.W.B. Powell in 1944, as a likely member of the genus Veprecula. The holotype was collected from the Metropolitan Abattoirs Bore in Adelaide, Australia at a depth of between 122–152 m (400–499 ft) by Walter Howchin and Joseph Verco in 1919, and is held by the Auckland War Memorial Museum.

== Distribution ==
This extinct marine species dates to the middle Miocene (Bairnsdalian), and occurs in the strata of the St Vincent Basin of South Australia, including the lower Dry Creek Sands.
