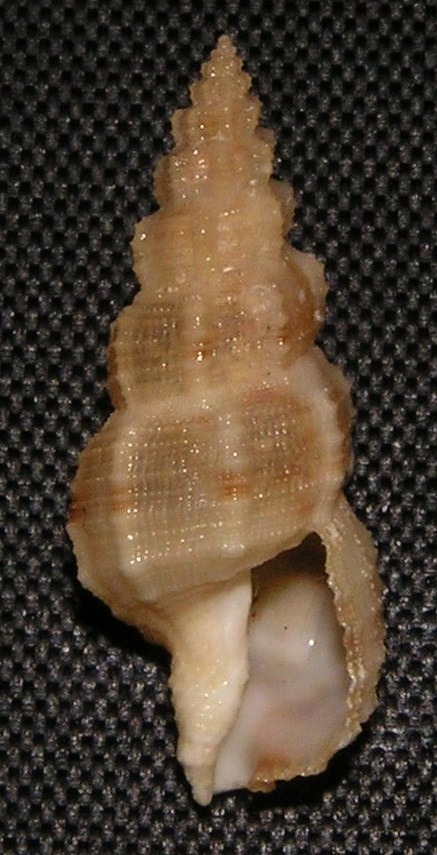
- Shell of Tritonoturris amabilis

Scientific classification
- Kingdom: Animalia
- Phylum: Mollusca
- Class: Gastropoda
- Subclass: Caenogastropoda
- Order: Neogastropoda
- Family: Raphitomidae
- Genus: Tritonoturris
- Species: T. amabilis

Binomial name
- Tritonoturris amabilis (Hinds, 1843)

Synonyms
- Clathurella amabilis (Hinds, 1843); Clathurella elegans Pease, 1860 (junior synonym); Clathurella robillardi H. Adams, 1869 (original combination); Clavatula amabilis Hinds, 1843; Pleurotoma amabilis Reeve, 1846; Tritonoturris robillardi (H. Adams, 1869)

= Tritonoturris amabilis =

Species of gastropod

Tritonoturris amabilis is a species of sea snail, a marine gastropod mollusk in the family Raphitomidae.

This species was placed in this genus by A.W.B. Powell in 1966.

== Description ==
The length of the shell attains 22 mm.

The thin, white shell shows distant, thin, ridge-like ribs, and distant revolving lirae, more closely striate at the base. (described as Clathurella robillardi)

The shell contains nine whorls. The few ribs are distant and narrow. The revolving striae are fine and close. The color is pale orange-brown, the body whorl shows a narrow white band, the suture is ornamented with white spots. (described as Clathurella amabilis).

== Distribution ==
This marine species occurs off Mauritius, Southeast Asia; Indonesia; the Philippines and Papua New Guinea.
