= Rimosodaphnella brunneolineata =

Scientific classification
- Kingdom: Animalia
- Phylum: Mollusca
- Class: Gastropoda
- Subclass: Caenogastropoda
- Order: Neogastropoda
- Superfamily: Conoidea
- Family: Raphitomidae
- Genus: Rimosodaphnella
- Species: R. brunneolineata

Binomial name
- Rimosodaphnella brunneolineata Bonfitto & Morassi, 2013

Species of gastropod

Rimosodaphnella brunneolineata is a species of sea snail, a marine gastropod mollusk in the family Raphitomidae.

== Description ==
The length of the shell reaches 8 mm.

== Distribution ==
This marine species occurs off Mactan Island, Cebu, Philippines
