= Famelica pacifica =

Scientific classification
- Kingdom: Animalia
- Phylum: Mollusca
- Class: Gastropoda
- Subclass: Caenogastropoda
- Order: Neogastropoda
- Superfamily: Conoidea
- Family: Raphitomidae
- Genus: Famelica
- Species: F. pacifica

Binomial name
- Famelica pacifica Sysoev & Kantor, 1987

Species of gastropod

Famelica pacifica is a species of sea snail, a marine gastropod mollusk in the family Raphitomidae.

== Distribution ==
This marine species occurs in the Northwest Pacific.
