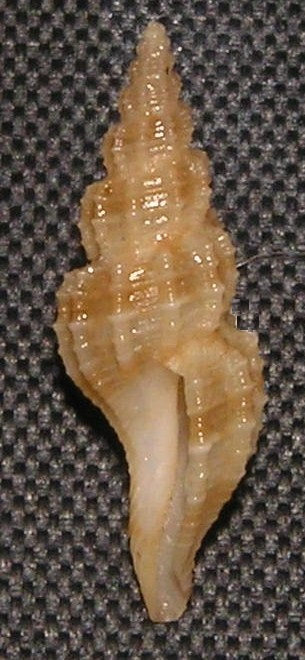
- Shell of Veprecula gracilispira

Scientific classification
- Kingdom: Animalia
- Phylum: Mollusca
- Class: Gastropoda
- Subclass: Caenogastropoda
- Order: Neogastropoda
- Superfamily: Conoidea
- Family: Raphitomidae
- Genus: Veprecula
- Species: V. gracilispira

Binomial name
- Veprecula gracilispira (E.A. Smith, 1879)

Synonyms
- Defrancia gracilispira E.A. Smith, 1879

= Veprecula gracilispira =

Species of gastropod

Veprecula gracilispira is a species of sea snail, a marine gastropod mollusk in the family Raphitomidae.

== Description ==
(Original description) The slender, fusiform shell is dirty yellowish, faintly banded with livid brown between the ribs near the top of the whorls, and stained with the same colour from the middle of the body whorl downwards. The shell contains 12 whorls. The three whorls in the protoconch are convex, minutely reticulated with raised obliquely crossing lines. The rest are very convex, with a slight concavity, sculptured with distinct arcuate short raised lines beneath the suture, also bearing slender oblique costellae (13 on the penultimate whorl), which are crossed by transverse lirae. These are four to six on the upper whorl, nodulous on the riblets. The nodules are compressed and subacute. The body whorl is convex above and slender below the middle. At this point the costellae are becoming obsolete. And thence downwards the whorl is transversely obliquely lirate. The lirae are simple, subequal, and rather close together. The aperture is narrow, occupying about four elevenths of the entire length. The outer lip is imperfect, probably incrassated as in the European Defrancia gracilis of Montagu (synonym of Comarmondia gracilis (G. Montagu, 1803) ). The sinus is located at the suture. The columella is obliquely tortuous . The siphonal canal is rather long, narrow and somewhat recurved.

The slender form, the delicate riblets, the shallow excavation at the upper part of the whorls, and their convexity are the principal distinctive characters of this interesting shell.

== Distribution ==
This marine species occurs off Japan.
