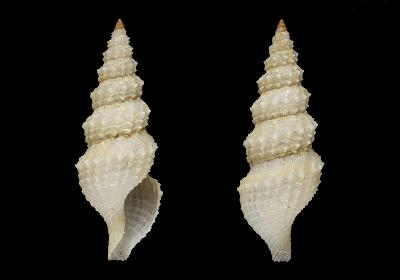
- Shell of Rimosodaphnella solomonensis (paratype at MNHN, Paris)

Scientific classification
- Kingdom: Animalia
- Phylum: Mollusca
- Class: Gastropoda
- Subclass: Caenogastropoda
- Order: Neogastropoda
- Superfamily: Conoidea
- Family: Raphitomidae
- Genus: Rimosodaphnella
- Species: R. solomonensis

Binomial name
- Rimosodaphnella solomonensis Bonfitto & Morassi, 2013

= Rimosodaphnella solomonensis =

Species of gastropod

Rimosodaphnella solomonensis is a species of sea snail, a marine gastropod mollusk in the family Raphitomidae.

== Description ==
The length of the shell reaches 11.6 mm.

== Distribution ==
This marine species occurs off Papua New Guinea and the Solomon Islands.
