= Tritonoturris secta =

Scientific classification
- Kingdom: Animalia
- Phylum: Mollusca
- Class: Gastropoda
- Subclass: Caenogastropoda
- Order: Neogastropoda
- Superfamily: Conoidea
- Family: Raphitomidae
- Genus: Tritonoturris
- Species: T. secta

Binomial name
- Tritonoturris secta (Sowerby, G.B. II, 1870)

Synonyms
- Defrancia secta Sowerby, G.B. II, 1870 (taxon inquirendum)

Species of gastropod

Tritonoturris secta is a species of sea snail, a marine gastropod mollusk in the family Raphitomidae.

== Description ==
The length of the shell attains 20 mm, its diameter 6.9 mm.

== Distribution ==
This marine species occurs in the South China Sea.
