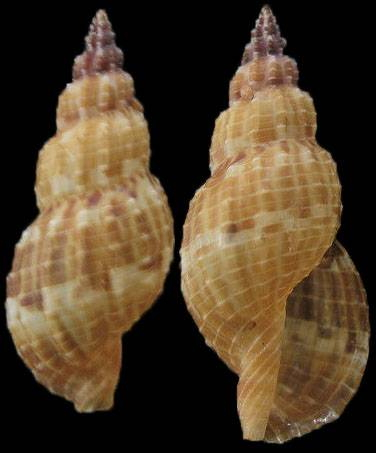
- Shell of Tritonoturris cumingii

Scientific classification
- Kingdom: Animalia
- Phylum: Mollusca
- Class: Gastropoda
- Subclass: Caenogastropoda
- Order: Neogastropoda
- Superfamily: Conoidea
- Family: Raphitomidae
- Genus: Tritonoturris
- Species: T. cumingii

Binomial name
- Tritonoturris cumingii (Powys & Sowerby I, 1835)

Synonyms
- Buccinum cumingii Powys & Sowerby I, 1835; Clathurella harpa Pease, W.H., 1860; Pleurotoma albibalteata Reeve, 1843; Pleurotoma tritonoides Reeve, 1843; Tritonoturris albibalteata (Reeve, 1843); Tritonoturris harpa Pease, 1860; Tritonoturris tritonoides Reeve, 1843

= Tritonoturris cumingii =

Species of gastropod

Tritonoturris cumingii is a species of sea snail, a marine gastropod mollusk in the family Raphitomidae.

== Description ==
The length of the shell varies between 11 mm and 40 mm

The ribs are slightly nodulous. The columella is spirally plaited. The siphonal canal is very short and slightly recurved. The outer lip is somewhat thin, without external varix. The sinus is small and distinct. The color of the shell is pale orange-brown with small deeper colored spots. The revolving striae are white.

== Distribution ==
This marine species occurs in the Red Sea and off Mauritius, the Philippines and French Polynesia.
