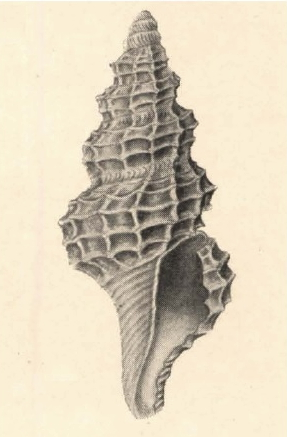
- Original image of a shell of Veprecula cooperi

Scientific classification
- Kingdom: Animalia
- Phylum: Mollusca
- Class: Gastropoda
- Subclass: Caenogastropoda
- Order: Neogastropoda
- Superfamily: Conoidea
- Family: Raphitomidae
- Genus: Veprecula
- Species: V. cooperi

Binomial name
- Veprecula cooperi Mestayer, 1919

= Veprecula cooperi =

Species of gastropod

Veprecula cooperi is a species of sea snail, a marine gastropod mollusk in the family Raphitomidae.

== Description ==
The length of the shell attains 6 mm, its diameter 2 mm.

(Original description) The small, fragile, fusiform shell is slender and prickly. The spire is pagodiform. The shell contains five whorls, plus a three-whorled embryonic protoconch, which is finely longitudinally ribbed. The whorls are convex, contracting rapidly. The sculpture shows four sharp raised spiral ribs, crossed by about twelve equally sharp raised axial ribs, which disappear below the fourth spiral, and are interrupted above by the broad anal fasciole. The intersection of the ribs is marked by a sharp prickle. Between the raised ribs are deep oblong pits, the surface of which is smooth and dull. The anal fasciole is crossed by fine crescentic growth-lines, and bordered on its outer edge by a narrow double thread. The anal slit nearly 1 mm. in length. The suture is distinct, serrated by the lowest spiral. Coming from inside the vertical columella and covering the base and the siphonal canal are about twelve fine equidistant spiral threads. The siphonal anal is short, open, very slightly recurved. The outer lip is thin and sharp. In the holotype it is slightly thickened by the last axial rib . The inner surface is deeply grooved by the spirals, and less so by the axials. The colour is uniform light biscuit-brown. The operculum is unknown. The animal is unknown.

== Distribution ==
This marine species is endemic to New Zealand and occurs off Off Three Kings Islands, Northland to Bay of Plenty, North Island,
