= Tritonoturris obesa =

Scientific classification
- Kingdom: Animalia
- Phylum: Mollusca
- Class: Gastropoda
- Subclass: Caenogastropoda
- Order: Neogastropoda
- Superfamily: Conoidea
- Family: Raphitomidae
- Genus: Tritonoturris
- Species: T. obesa

Binomial name
- Tritonoturris obesa Kilburn, 1977

Species of gastropod

Tritonoturris obesa is a species of sea snail, a marine gastropod mollusk in the family Raphitomidae.

== Description ==
The length of the shell attains 28 mm.

== Distribution ==
This marine species occurs off Northern KwaZulu-Natal, South Africa.
