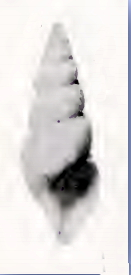
- Original image of a shell of Famelica mirmidina

Scientific classification
- Kingdom: Animalia
- Phylum: Mollusca
- Class: Gastropoda
- Subclass: Caenogastropoda
- Order: Neogastropoda
- Superfamily: Conoidea
- Family: Raphitomidae
- Genus: Famelica
- Species: F. mirmidina

Binomial name
- Famelica mirmidina (Dautzenberg & Fischer, 1896)

Synonyms
- Pleurotoma mirmidina Dautzenberg & Fischer, 1896

= Famelica mirmidina =

Species of gastropod

Famelica mirmidina is a species of sea snail, a marine gastropod mollusk in the family Raphitomidae.

== Description ==
The length of the shell attains 7.5 mm, its diameter 2.5 mm.

The thin shell has a long spire. It contains 8 whorls. The suture is impressed. The subsutural band is distinguished from the rest of the surface only by the direction of the growth striae that are arched in the opposite direction. At the base of the upper whorls, there are some very short longitudinal threads. The top of the holotype is in very bad condition so we cannot see if these are the vestiges of a general sculpture of the embryonic whorl. The aperture is slightly pyriform. The wide siphonal canal is very short. The narrow columella stands almost upright and is slightly twisted at the base. It shows a very thin callus. The outer lip is thin and sharp. The shell shows a uniform white color.

== Distribution ==
F. mirmidina can be found in waters off the western coast of Florida. Also off Guadeloupe and the Azores.
