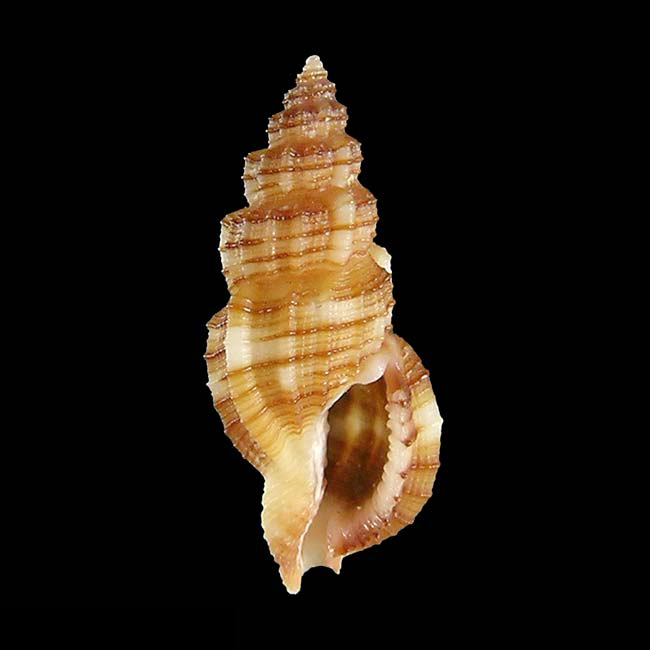
- Shell of Tritonoturris difficilis

Scientific classification
- Kingdom: Animalia
- Phylum: Mollusca
- Class: Gastropoda
- Subclass: Caenogastropoda
- Order: Neogastropoda
- Superfamily: Conoidea
- Family: Raphitomidae
- Genus: Tritonoturris
- Species: T. difficilis

Binomial name
- Tritonoturris difficilis Stahlschmidt, Poppe & Tagaro, 2018

= Tritonoturris difficilis =

Species of gastropod

Tritonoturris difficilis is a species of sea snail, a marine gastropod mollusc in the family Raphitomidae.

== Description ==
The length of the shell varies between 8 mm and 14 mm.

== Distribution ==
This marine species occurs off the Philippines.

== Original description ==
- Stahlschmidt P., Poppe G.T. & Tagaro S.P. (2018). Descriptions of remarkable new turrid species from the Philippines. Visaya. 5(1): 5-64. page(s): 9, pl. 4 figs 1–3.
