= Famelica tajourensis =

Scientific classification
- Kingdom: Animalia
- Phylum: Mollusca
- Class: Gastropoda
- Subclass: Caenogastropoda
- Order: Neogastropoda
- Superfamily: Conoidea
- Family: Raphitomidae
- Genus: Famelica
- Species: F. tajourensis

Binomial name
- Famelica tajourensis Sysoev & Kantor, 1987

Species of gastropod

Famelica tajourensis is a species of sea snail, a marine gastropod mollusk in the family Raphitomidae.

== Distribution ==
Thisspecies occurs in the Gulf of Aden.
