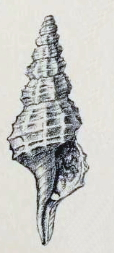
- Shell of Veprecula vepratica

Scientific classification
- Kingdom: Animalia
- Phylum: Mollusca
- Class: Gastropoda
- Subclass: Caenogastropoda
- Order: Neogastropoda
- Superfamily: Conoidea
- Family: Raphitomidae
- Genus: Veprecula
- Species: V. vepratica

Binomial name
- Veprecula vepratica (Hedley, 1903)

Synonyms
- Clathurina (Veprecula) vepratica Melvill, 1917; Pleurotoma vepratica Hedley, 1903; Pleurotomella vepratica Hedley, 1910

= Veprecula vepratica =

Species of gastropod

Veprecula vepratica is a species of sea snail, a marine gastropod mollusk in the family Raphitomidae.

== Description ==
The length of the shell varies between 3.5 mm and 12 mm.

(Original description) The small, thin, slender shell is fusiform and prickly. The spire is pagodiform. Its colour is uniform pale brown. The shell contains six whorls, plus a five-whorled embryonic protoconch.

Sculpture: except the prickles and the ridges, the whole surface is microscopically granulated. Ten sharp projecting radial ribs, interrupted by the broad anal fasciole, ascend the spire obliquely. Along the periphery of each whorl runs a broad spiral shelf, beneath it are two similar but lesser spirals, the lowest of which is half buried in the suture, and above it are three rapidly and successively diminishing spirals. These radials and spirals enclose deeply sunk lozenges, at the point of intersection upwardly directed prickles arise. The anal fasciole is marked with crescentic striae. On the base and siphonal canal are a dozen spiral threads.

The apex of five whorls is sharply differentiated from the adult shell, sculptured with close delicate, crenulate, radial riblets. Slit sutural, broad and deep. The aperture is pyriform, narrowing gradually to the siphonal canal. The outer lip is sharp. There is no callus on the columella. The siphonal canal is very long, open and sinuate.

== Distribution ==
This marine species occurs in the Persian Gulf and off Japan; off New South Wales, Australia.
