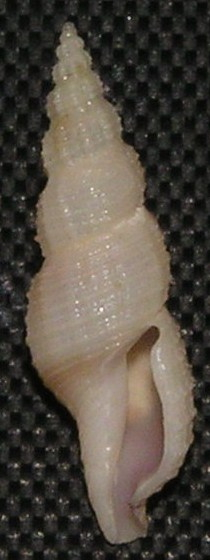
- Shell of Tritonoturris oxyclathrus

Scientific classification
- Kingdom: Animalia
- Phylum: Mollusca
- Class: Gastropoda
- Subclass: Caenogastropoda
- Order: Neogastropoda
- Superfamily: Conoidea
- Family: Raphitomidae
- Genus: Tritonoturris
- Species: T. oxyclathrus

Binomial name
- Tritonoturris oxyclathrus (Martens, 1880)

Synonyms
- Clathurella oxyclathrus (Martens, 1880); Pleurotoma oxyclathrus Martens, 1880 (original combination)

= Tritonoturris oxyclathrus =

Species of gastropod

Tritonoturris oxyclathrus is a species of sea snail, a marine gastropod mollusk in the family Raphitomidae.

This species was placed in this genus in 2010 by Baoquan Li, Xinzheng Li, and Richard N. Kilburn.

== Description ==
The length of the shell varies between 17 mm and 31 mm.

The whorls are clathrate by distant longitudinal and revolving lirae, forming nodes at the intersections. The interstices are finely cancellate. The sinus is narrow and deep. The color of the shell is light yellowish brown.

== Distribution ==
This marine species occurs off New Guinea, the Philippines and in the South China Sea.
