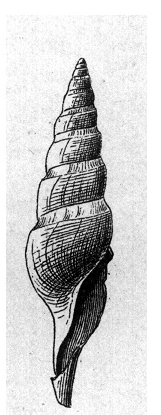
- Original image of a shell of Famelica scipio

Scientific classification
- Kingdom: Animalia
- Phylum: Mollusca
- Class: Gastropoda
- Subclass: Caenogastropoda
- Order: Neogastropoda
- Superfamily: Conoidea
- Family: Raphitomidae
- Genus: Famelica
- Species: F. scipio

Binomial name
- Famelica scipio (Dall, 1889)

Synonyms
- Mangelia scipio (Dall, 1889); Mangilia scipio Dall, 1889 (original combination)

= Famelica scipio =

Species of sea snail

Famelica scipio is a species of sea snail, a marine gastropod mollusk in the family Raphitomidae.

== Description ==
The length of the shell attains 14 mm.

== Distribution ==
This marine species occurs off Dominica and St Vincent at depths between 227 m to 1,796 m.
