= Veprecula tornipila =

Scientific classification
- Kingdom: Animalia
- Phylum: Mollusca
- Class: Gastropoda
- Subclass: Caenogastropoda
- Order: Neogastropoda
- Superfamily: Conoidea
- Family: Raphitomidae
- Genus: Veprecula
- Species: V. tornipila

Binomial name
- Veprecula tornipila McLean & Poorman, 1971

Species of gastropod

Veprecula tornipila is a species of sea snail, a marine gastropod mollusk in the family Raphitomidae.

== Distribution ==
This marine species occurs off the Galapagos Islands.
