= Tritonoturris poppei =

Scientific classification
- Kingdom: Animalia
- Phylum: Mollusca
- Class: Gastropoda
- Subclass: Caenogastropoda
- Order: Neogastropoda
- Superfamily: Conoidea
- Family: Raphitomidae
- Genus: Tritonoturris
- Species: T. poppei

Binomial name
- Tritonoturris poppei Vera-Pelaez & Vega-Luz, 1999

Species of gastropod

Tritonoturris poppei is a species of sea snail, a marine gastropod mollusk in the family Raphitomidae.

== Description ==
The length of the shell varies between 35 mm and 45 mm.

== Distribution ==
This marine species occurs off the Philippines.
