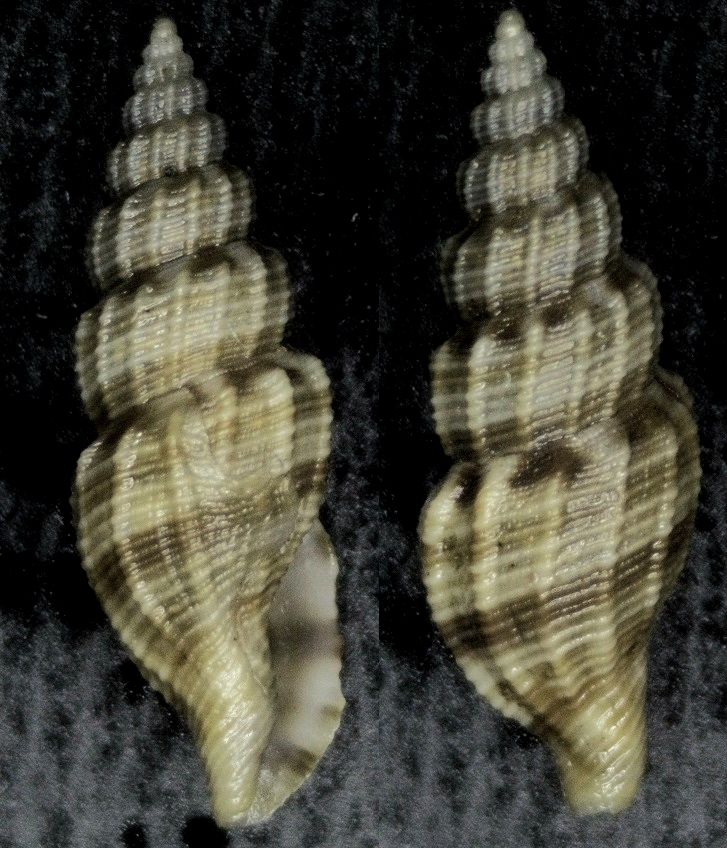
- Shell of Tritonoturris macandrewi

Scientific classification
- Kingdom: Animalia
- Phylum: Mollusca
- Class: Gastropoda
- Subclass: Caenogastropoda
- Order: Neogastropoda
- Superfamily: Conoidea
- Family: Raphitomidae
- Genus: Tritonoturris
- Species: T. macandrewi

Binomial name
- Tritonoturris macandrewi (E.A. Smith, 1882)

Synonyms
- Pleurotoma (Daphnella) macandrewi E.A. Smith, 1882

= Tritonoturris macandrewi =

Species of gastropod

Tritonoturris macandrewi is a species of sea snail, a marine gastropod mollusk in the family Raphitomidae.

== Description ==
The length of the shell varies between 14 mm and 24 mm.

== Distribution ==
This marine species occurs in the Persian Gulf, the Gulf of Oman and off the Philippines and in the China Seas.
