= Famelica monoceros =

Scientific classification
- Kingdom: Animalia
- Phylum: Mollusca
- Class: Gastropoda
- Subclass: Caenogastropoda
- Order: Neogastropoda
- Superfamily: Conoidea
- Family: Raphitomidae
- Genus: Famelica
- Species: F. monoceros

Binomial name
- Famelica monoceros (Watson, 1881)

Synonyms
- Clathurella monoceros (R. B. Watson, 1881); Clathurella (Daphnella) monoceros (R. B. Watson, 1881); Famelica ischna Dall, 1927; Mangilia ischna Dall, W.H., 1927; Pleurotoma (Thesbia ?) monoceros Watson, 1881

Species of gastropod

Famelica monoceros is a species of sea snail, a marine gastropod mollusk in the family Raphitomidae.

== Description ==
The length of the shell attains 4.6 mm.

The thin, ivory-white, high, narrow shell is drawn out, with fine spiral threads, a very oblique impressed suture, rounded whorls, and a contracted base produced into a longish snout.

Sculpture. Longitudinals—none but fine, somewhat unequal lines of growth. Spirals—with the exception of the sinus-area, the whole surface is covered by fine, rounded, unequal, and irregularly interrupted spiral threads with rather broader intervals. The colour is porcellaneous, ivory-white, glossy.

The spire is remarkably narrow, high, drawn out and conical. The apex is broken. There are five whorls remaining, but probably 8–9 in all, of very regular, but rather rapid increase, high, oblique, slightly tumid. The body whorl is rounded, with a conical, protracted, but very lop-sided base running out into a longish straight columella and triangular snout. The suture is very oblique and rather deeply impressed. The aperture is pear-shaped, scarcely pointed above, and protracted into a gradually narrowing siphonal canal below. The outer lip has a very regular curve in both its planes. The outer edge has a very high and prominent shoulder, whose upper side runs a long way parallel to the body whorl above it, having a very deep rather than narrow sinus, between which and the body whorl is no shelf whatever. The inner lip is on the narrow body scarcely perceptible as a glaze. On the long direct twisted columella it is a little thicker, but is very narrow : the end of the columella is cut off with a very long-drawn, oblique, slowly narrowing, sharp, twisted edge.

== Distribution ==
This marine shell occurs off Sierra Leone and Georgia, USA
