= Veprecula brunonia =

Scientific classification
- Kingdom: Animalia
- Phylum: Mollusca
- Class: Gastropoda
- Subclass: Caenogastropoda
- Order: Neogastropoda
- Superfamily: Conoidea
- Family: Raphitomidae
- Genus: Veprecula
- Species: V. brunonia

Binomial name
- Veprecula brunonia (Dall, 1924)

Synonyms
- Turricula (Mordica) brunonia Dall, 1924

Species of gastropod

Veprecula brunonia is a species of sea snail, a marine gastropod mollusk in the family Raphitomidae.

== Description ==
The length of the shell attains 3 mm.

(Original description) The minute shell shows an absurdly accurate resemblance to the large species of Turricula. It has inflated whorls, a constricted suture and a relatively long siphonal canal. The holotype has a slender brown protoconch of four long axially ribbed whorls and three and a half subsequent inflated whorls. The shell shows seven axial ribs, and a deep anal sulcus close to the suture.

== Distribution ==
This marine species occurs off Hawaii and Réunion
