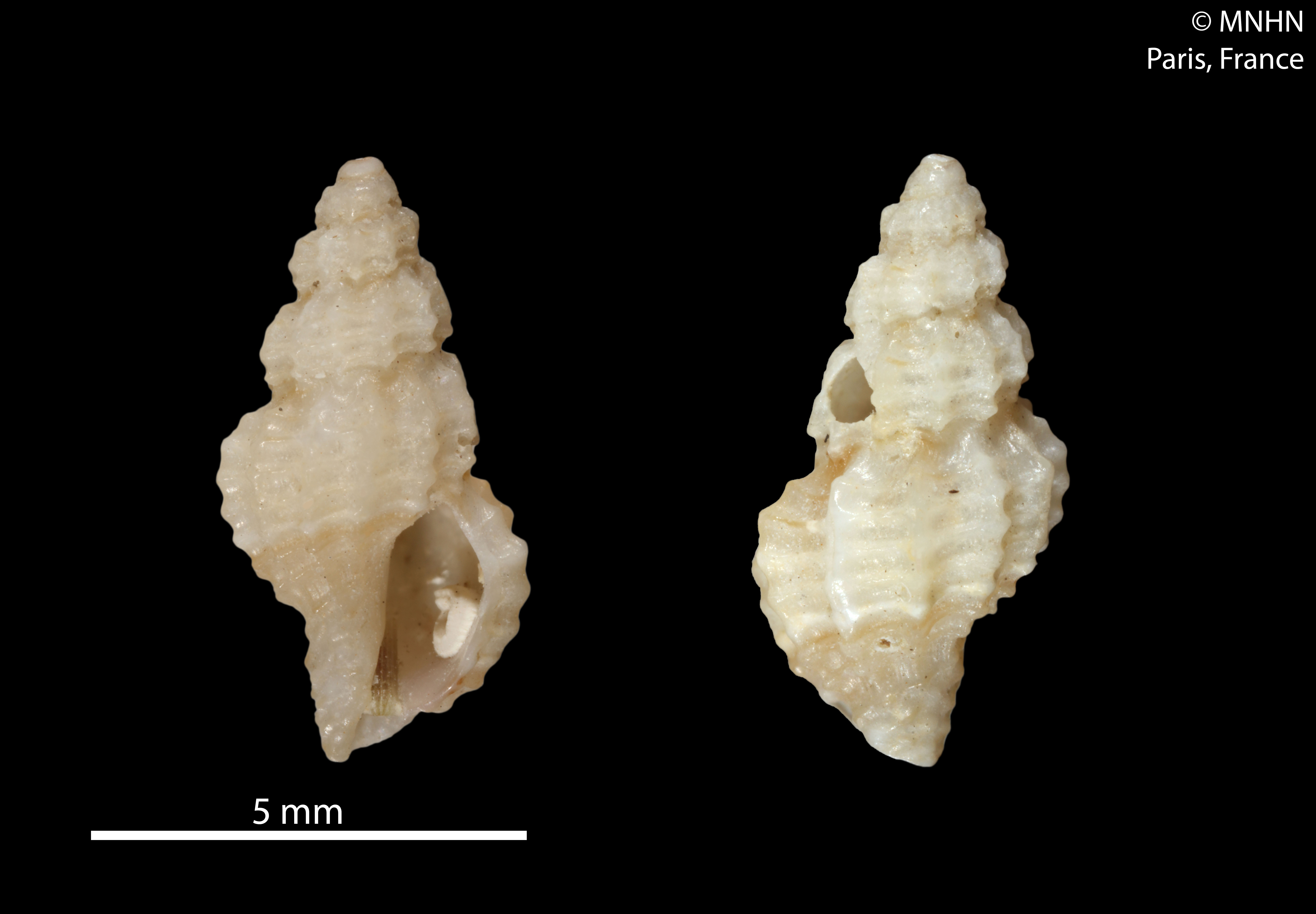
- Shell of Tritonoturris phaula (paratype at MNHN, Paris)

Scientific classification
- Kingdom: Animalia
- Phylum: Mollusca
- Class: Gastropoda
- Subclass: Caenogastropoda
- Order: Neogastropoda
- Superfamily: Conoidea
- Family: Raphitomidae
- Genus: Tritonoturris
- Species: T. phaula

Binomial name
- Tritonoturris phaula Kilburn, 1977

= Tritonoturris phaula =

Species of gastropod

Tritonoturris phaula is a species of sea snail, a marine gastropod mollusk in the family Raphitomidae.

== Description ==
The length of the shell varies between 7.7 mm (holotype) and 8.7 mm.

== Distribution ==
This marine species occurs off False Bay, East London, South Africa.
