= Veprecula sykesii =

Scientific classification
- Kingdom: Animalia
- Phylum: Mollusca
- Class: Gastropoda
- Subclass: Caenogastropoda
- Order: Neogastropoda
- Superfamily: Conoidea
- Family: Raphitomidae
- Genus: Veprecula
- Species: V. sykesii

Binomial name
- Veprecula sykesii (Melvill & Standen, 1903)

Synonyms
- Clathurella sykesii Melvill & Standen, 1903

Species of gastropod

Veprecula sykesii is a species of sea snail, a marine gastropod mollusk in the family Raphitomidae.

== Distribution ==
This species occurs in the Gulf of Oman.
