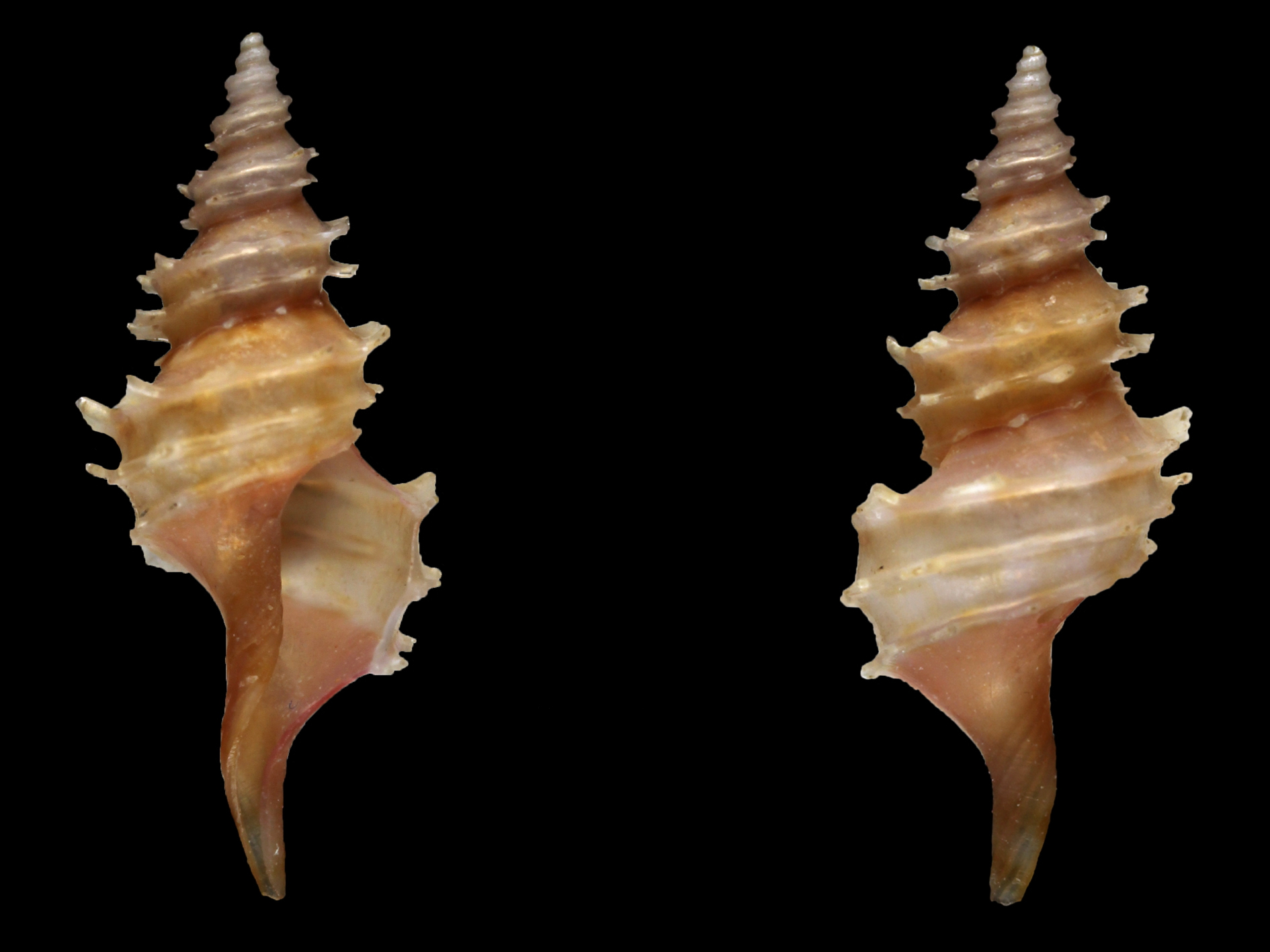
- Shell of Famelica polyacantha (paratype in the MNHN, Paris)

Scientific classification
- Kingdom: Animalia
- Phylum: Mollusca
- Class: Gastropoda
- Subclass: Caenogastropoda
- Order: Neogastropoda
- Superfamily: Conoidea
- Family: Raphitomidae
- Genus: Famelica
- Species: F. polyacantha

Binomial name
- Famelica polyacantha (Stahlschmidt, Chino & Kilburn, 2012)

Synonyms
- Veprecula polyacantha Stahlschmidt, Chino & Kilburn, 2012 (original combination)

= Famelica polyacantha =

Species of gastropod

Famelica polyacantha is a species of sea snail, a marine gastropod mollusk in the family Raphitomidae.

== Description ==
The length of the shell varies between 5 mm and 12 mm.

== Distribution ==
This marine species occurs off the Philippines.
