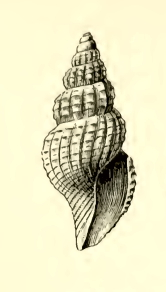
- Original image of a shell of Rimosodaphnella morra

Scientific classification
- Kingdom: Animalia
- Phylum: Mollusca
- Class: Gastropoda
- Subclass: Caenogastropoda
- Order: Neogastropoda
- Superfamily: Conoidea
- Family: Raphitomidae
- Genus: Rimosodaphnella
- Species: R. morra

Binomial name
- Rimosodaphnella morra (Dall, 1881)

Synonyms
- Daphnella morra (Dall, 1881); Pleurotoma (Drillia) morra Dall, 1881 (original combination); Veprecula morra (Dall, 1881)

= Rimosodaphnella morra =

Species of gastropod

Rimosodaphnella morra, common name the Morra daphnella, is a species of sea snail, a marine gastropod mollusk in the family Raphitomidae.

== Description ==
The length of the shell varies between 3 mm and 11 mm.

(Original description) The small, acute shell has a sinusigera protoconch, and seven or eight reticulated, full and rounded whorls. The sculpture consists, on the earlier whorls, of ten or twelve, and, on the body whorl, of twenty-five equal, rounded, close-set riblets, beginning at the anterior edge of the band, growing stronger and wider to the periphery, after which they again diminish, covering the whorls, and on the last visible nearly to the extreme of the siphonal canal. These are crossed by (on the fourth whorl) four, or (on the body whorl) about twenty-five close-set rounded threads, with a tendency to form a little nodule where they cross the summit of the transverse ribs, and pretty even in size. The first one forms a smooth margin to the narrow, but well-defined notch-band, which is crossed by the lines of growth deeply waved, and extends to the suture, which is not appressed. The outer lip is thin, much produced forward, as in Daphnella, but the notch is distinct and very deep, with its edges simple and not reflected. The columella is lightly twisted, without a callus. The siphonal canal is distinct and slightly recurved.

== Distribution ==
R. morra can be found in Atlantic waters, ranging from the coast of North Carolina south to Brazil.; in the Caribbean Sea and the Gulf of Mexico.
