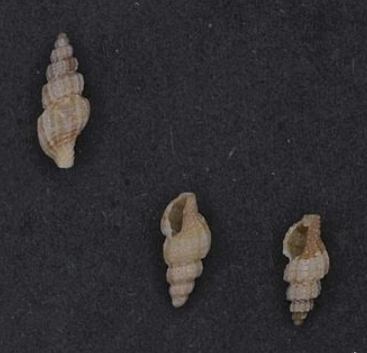
- Shell of Tritonoturris capensis at Naturalis Biodiversity Center

Scientific classification
- Kingdom: Animalia
- Phylum: Mollusca
- Class: Gastropoda
- Subclass: Caenogastropoda
- Order: Neogastropoda
- Superfamily: Conoidea
- Family: Raphitomidae
- Genus: Tritonoturris
- Species: T. capensis

Binomial name
- Tritonoturris capensis (E.A. Smith, 1882)

Synonyms
- Clathurella capensis (E. A. Smith, 1882); Daphnella capensis (E. A. Smith, 1882); Defrancia capensis (E. A. Smith, 1882); Philbertia capensis (E. A. Smith, 1882) (superseded combination); Pleurotoma capensis E.A. Smith, 1882; Pleurotomella ida Thiele, 1925 (junior synonym); Raphitoma ida (Thiele, 1925); Raphitoma ornatus Strebel, 1904; Trophon ornatus Turton, W.H., 1932

= Tritonoturris capensis =

Species of gastropod

Tritonoturris capensis is a species of sea snail, a marine gastropod mollusk in the family Raphitomidae. often found along the coast of South Africa. Tritonoturris capensis is highly regarded for its beautiful shell and is sought after by collectors and shell enthusiasts.

The shell can grow up to 4-5 centimeters in height and is characterized by distinct spiral ridges and fine, intricate patterns. The coloration of the shell varies from creamy white to light brown, often adorned with reddish-brown or dark brown blotches and bands.

This species is typically found in sandy or muddy habitats, particularly in the intertidal zone and subtidal regions. It is known to inhabit depths ranging from shallow waters to around 100 meters. Tritonoturris capensis is primarily a predator, feeding on small marine invertebrates such as crustaceans and other gastropods. It uses its long, extensible proboscis to capture prey.

== Description ==
The length of the shell attains 13 mm, its diameter is 5 mm.

== Distribution ==
This marine species occurs off Port Elizabeth and False Bay, South Africa and off Mozambique.
