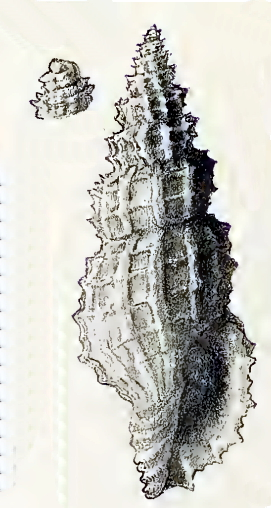
- Original image of a shell (and the protoconch) of Tritonoturris menecharmes

Scientific classification
- Kingdom: Animalia
- Phylum: Mollusca
- Class: Gastropoda
- Subclass: Caenogastropoda
- Order: Neogastropoda
- Superfamily: Conoidea
- Family: Raphitomidae
- Genus: Tritonoturris
- Species: T. menecharmes

Binomial name
- Tritonoturris menecharmes (J.C. Melvill, 1923)

Synonyms
- Veprecula menecharmes Melvill, 1923

= Tritonoturris menecharmes =

Species of gastropod

Tritonoturris menecharmes is a species of sea snail, a marine gastropod mollusk in the family Raphitomidae.

Subspecies

- Tritonoturris menecharmes albescens Melvill, 1923

== Description ==
The length of the shell varies between 8 mm and 30 mm.

(Original description) The delicate, turreted shell has a pale ochreous-brown color, or is (var. albescens) pure white. The shell contains 8-9 whorls. The protoconch itself is globular, plain, the next is beautifully but microscopically cancellate, the remainder is longitudinally acutely costate, angled above. They are crossed by, in full-grown specimens, on the upper whorls, two, on the body whorl four, spiral raised ribs. The interstitial spaces are quadrate, smooth and acutely echinate at the points of junction. The number of the ribs on the body whorl is eleven to twelve. The aperture is oblong. The outer lip is incrassate, without 5-echinate, and obscurely denticulate. The sinus is fairly broad and conspicuous. The columellar margin is straight and multiplied. The siphonal canal is abbreviated and slightly recurved.

== Distribution ==
This marine species occurs off Mauritius, Taiwan and the Philippines.
