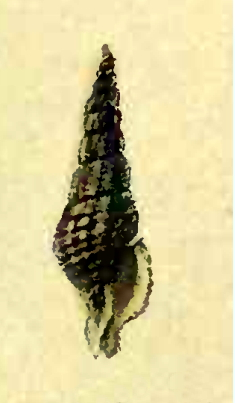
- Shell of Veprecula sculpta

Scientific classification
- Kingdom: Animalia
- Phylum: Mollusca
- Class: Gastropoda
- Subclass: Caenogastropoda
- Order: Neogastropoda
- Superfamily: Conoidea
- Family: Raphitomidae
- Genus: Veprecula
- Species: V. sculpta

Binomial name
- Veprecula sculpta (Hinds, 1843)

Synonyms
- Clavatula sculpta Hinds, 1843; Rimosodaphnella sculpta (Hinds, 1843)

= Veprecula sculpta =

Species of gastropod

Veprecula sculpta is a species of sea snail, a marine gastropod mollusk in the family Raphitomidae.

== Description ==
The length of the shell attains 21 mm.

The whorls are rather flatly convex, ribbed longitudinally, crossed by fine revolving lines. The ribs are rounded, rather compressed, leaving off near the suture. The outer lip is externally varicose. The color of the shell is yellowish, banded with light brown.

== Distribution ==
This marine species occurs off Pacific Panama.
