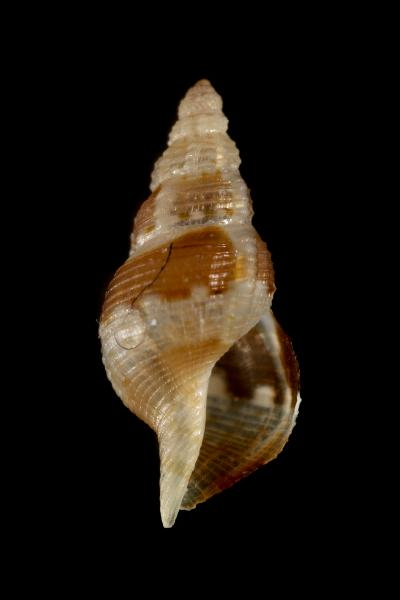
- Shell of Asperdaphne paucicostata (specimen at MNHN, Paris)

Scientific classification
- Kingdom: Animalia
- Phylum: Mollusca
- Class: Gastropoda
- Subclass: Caenogastropoda
- Order: Neogastropoda
- Superfamily: Conoidea
- Family: Raphitomidae
- Genus: Asperdaphne
- Species: A. paucicostata

Binomial name
- Asperdaphne paucicostata (Pease, 1860)

Synonyms
- List: Clathurella paucicostata Pease, 1860 superseded combination; Daphnella lifouana Hervier, 1897 (original combination); Tritonoturris lifouana (Hervier, 1897) junior subjective synonym; Tritonoturris paucicostata (Pease, 1860) superseded combination

= Asperdaphne paucicostata =

Species of gastropod

Asperdaphne paucicostata is a species of sea snail, a marine gastropod mollusk in the family Raphitomidae.

== Description ==
The length of the shell attains 11 mm, its diameter 3.5 mm.

The shell is elongately fusiform, thin and shining. The whorls are ornamented with varices, remote, and fine transverse raised striae. The outer lip is thin. The aperture is elongate-oval. The siphonal canal is long and slightly recurved. The colour of the shell is white, with irregular orange-brown spots or blotches. The varices are white.

== Distribution ==
This marine species occurs off Hawaii, the Loyalty Islands and Papua New Guinea.
