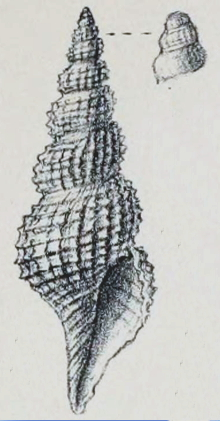
- Shell of Veprecula arethusa

Scientific classification
- Kingdom: Animalia
- Phylum: Mollusca
- Class: Gastropoda
- Subclass: Caenogastropoda
- Order: Neogastropoda
- Superfamily: Conoidea
- Family: Raphitomidae
- Genus: Veprecula
- Species: V. arethusa

Binomial name
- Veprecula arethusa (Dall, 1918)

Synonyms
- Lienardia togetoges Nomura, S. & H. Niino, 1940; Pleurotoma (Defrancia) arethusa Dall, 1918 (not Pleurotoma reticulosa Edwards, 1861); Veprecula reticulosa Smith, 1882; Veprecula togetoges Nomura & Niino, 1940

= Veprecula arethusa =

Species of gastropod

Veprecula arethusa is a species of sea snail, a marine gastropod mollusk in the family Raphitomidae.

== Description ==
The length of the shell varies between 5 mm and 11.5 mm.

At the base of the body whorl, around the cauda, a faint brown band is traceable. The smooth furrow at the top of the ten whorls, their reticulated surface, and the rather produced but narrow siphonal canal are characters at once indicating this species.

Few descriptions and images of the shell exist and no recorded descriptions of a living V. arethusa have been found.

== Distribution ==
This species was found off Hengam Island in the Persian Gulf; also off Japan.
