= Daphnella corimbensis =

Scientific classification
- Kingdom: Animalia
- Phylum: Mollusca
- Class: Gastropoda
- Subclass: Caenogastropoda
- Order: Neogastropoda
- Superfamily: Conoidea
- Family: Raphitomidae
- Genus: Daphnella
- Species: D. corimbensis

Binomial name
- Daphnella corimbensis Rolán, Otero-Schmitt & Fernandes, 1998

Synonyms
- Daphnella (Paradaphne) corimbensis (Rolán, Otero-Schmitt & F. Fernandes, 1998)· accepted, alternate representation; Raphitoma corimbensis Rolán, Otero-Schmitt & F. Fernandes, 1998 (original combination)

Species of gastropod

Daphnella corimbensis is a species of sea snail, a marine gastropod mollusk in the family Raphitomidae.
