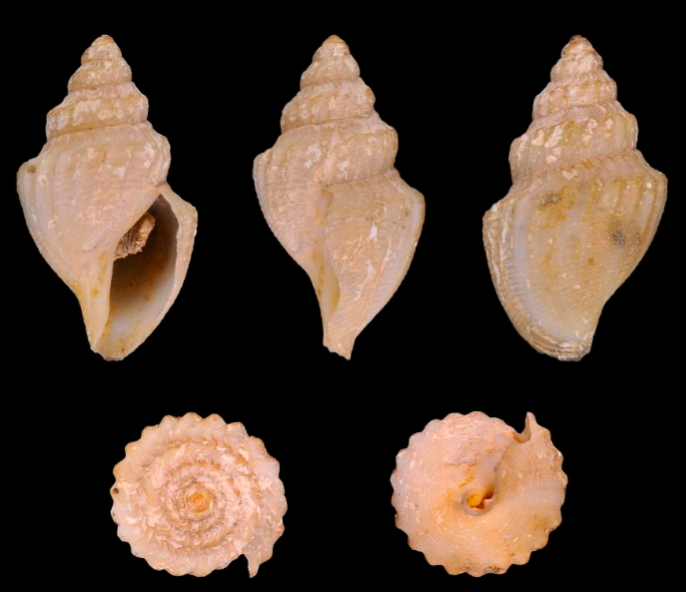
- Gymnobela engonia

Scientific classification
- Kingdom: Animalia
- Phylum: Mollusca
- Class: Gastropoda
- Subclass: Caenogastropoda
- Order: Neogastropoda
- Family: Raphitomidae
- Genus: Gymnobela; Verrill, 1884

Type species
- Gymnobela engonia Verrill, 1884

Species
- See text

Synonyms
- Majox F. Nordsieck, 1968; Watsonaria F. Nordsieck, 1968

= Gymnobela =

Genus of gastropods

Gymnobela is a genus of sea snails, marine gastropod mollusks in the family Raphitomidae.

This genus can sometimes be hardly differentiated from species in the genera Spergo Dall, 1895, Theta Clarke, 1959 and Speoides yoshidae Kuroda & Habe in Habe, 1961 (a synonym of Gymnobela yoshidae (Kuroda & Habe, 1961) )

This genus is highly diverse. It is rather an artificial assemblage of several unrelated genus-level lineages that are unrelated and mostly undescribed.

== Description ==
The rather solid shell is in form and general appearance like Bela. The spire is generally rather short. The body whorl is swollen. The whorls are often shouldered. The sculpture is rather strong. The protoconch has a fine cancellated sculpture. The subsutural band is not strongly marked. The posterior notch of the lip is shallow and usually not very distinct. The operculum is absent.

Fossils have been found in Pliocene strata of Panama and Quaternary strata of Costa Rica (age range: 3.6 to 0.781 Ma).

== Species ==
Species within the genus Gymnobela include:

- Gymnobela abyssorum (Locard, 1897)
- Gymnobela adenica Sysoev, 1996
- Gymnobela africana Sysoev, 1996
- Gymnobela agassizii (Verrill & Smith, 1880)
- Gymnobela altispira Sysoev & Ivanov, 1985
- Gymnobela angulosa Sysoev, 1988
- Gymnobela aquilarum (Watson, 1882)
- Gymnobela atypha (Bush, 1893)
- Gymnobela augusta Thiele, 1925
- Gymnobela bairdii (Verrill & Smith, 1884)
- Gymnobela baruna Sysoev, 1997
- Gymnobela blakeana (Dall, 1881)
- Gymnobela brachis (Dall, 1919)
- Gymnobela brachypleura Sysoev, 1990
- Gymnobela brunnistriata Sysoev, 1990
- Gymnobela bululi Stahlschmidt, Poppe & Tagaro, 2018
- Gymnobela camerunensis Thiele, 1925
- † Gymnobela carinaria (Powell, 1935)
- Gymnobela ceramensis (Schepman, 1913)
- Gymnobela chistikovi Sysoev & Ivanov, 1985
- Gymnobela chrysopelex (Barnard, 1963)
- Gymnobela chyta (Watson, 1881)
- Gymnobela clara Thiele, 1925
- Gymnobela crassilirata Sysoev, 1990
- † Gymnobela cyrillei Lozouet, 2017
- Gymnobela dagama (Barnard, 1963)
- Gymnobela daphnelloides (Dall, 1895)
- Gymnobela dautzenbergi (Knudsen, 1952)
- Gymnobela dubia (Schepman, 1913)
- Gymnobela edgariana (Dall, 1889)
- Gymnobela emertoni (Verrill, 1884)
- Gymnobela engonia Verrill, 1884
- Gymnobela eridmata Sysoev & Bouchet, 2001
- Gymnobela erronea Thiele, 1925
- Gymnobela eugenia Sysoev & Ivanov, 1985
- Gymnobela felderi Garcia, 2005
- Gymnobela filifera (Dall, 1881)
- Gymnobela fredericqae Garcia, 2005
- Gymnobela frielei (Verrill, 1885)
- Gymnobela glaucocreas (Barnard, 1963)
- Gymnobela gracilis Sysoev, 1990
- Gymnobela granulisculpturata Sysoev, 1990
- Gymnobela guineensis Thiele, 1925
- Gymnobela homoeotata (Watson, 1886)
- Gymnobela illicita Dall, 1927
- Gymnobela ioessa Sysoev, 1997
- Gymnobela isogonia (Dall, 1908)
- Gymnobela lamyi (Dautzenberg, 1925)
- Gymnobela lanceata Dall, 1927
- Gymnobela laticaudata Sysoev, 1990
- Gymnobela latistriata Kantor & Sysoev, 1986
- Gymnobela leptoglypta (Dautzenberg & Fischer, 1896)
- Gymnobela lineola (Dall, 1927)
- Gymnobela midpacifica Stahlschmidt & Chino, 2012
- Gymnobela mitrodeta Sysoev, 1997
- Gymnobela multilirata Ortega & Gofas, 2019
- Gymnobela muricata Sysoev, 1997
- Gymnobela nivea Sysoev, 1990
- Gymnobela oculifera Kantor & Sysoev, 1986
- Gymnobela petiti Garcia, 2005
- Gymnobela phyxanor (Watson, 1886)
- Gymnobela pulchra (Schepman, 1913)
- Gymnobela rotundata Sysoev, 1990
- † Gymnobela salinasi (Calcara, 1841)
- † Gymnobela santorsolae Tabanelli, 2018
- Gymnobela subaraneosa (Dautzenberg & Fischer, 1896)
- Gymnobela turrispira Sysoev, 1990
- Gymnobela verecunda (Barnard, 1963)
- Gymnobela vicella (Dall, 1908)
- Gymnobela virgo (Okutani, 1966)
- Gymnobela virgulata Sysoev & Bouchet, 2001
- Gymnobela xaioca Figueira & Absalão, 2012
- Gymnobela xylona (Dall, 1908)
- Gymnobela yoshidai (Habe, 1962)

Species brought into synonymy

List of synonyms
- Gymnobela adenicus [sic]: synonym of Gymnobela adenica Sysoev, 1996
- Gymnobela agassizi [sic]: synonym of Gymnobela agassizii (Verrill & S. Smith [in Verrill], 1880)
- Gymnobela bathyiberica Fechter, 1976 : synonym of Theta vayssierei (Dautzenberg, 1925)
- Gymnobela blakeana extensa Dall, 1881 : synonym of Mioawateria extensa (Dall, 1881)
- Gymnobela brevis Verrill, 1885: synonym of Gymnobela blakeana (Dall, 1881)
- Gymnobela chariessa (Watson, 1881): synonym of Theta chariessa (Watson, 1881)
- Gymnobela curta Verrill, 1884: synonym of Gymnobela aquilarum (Watson, 1882)
- Gymnobela extensa (Dall, 1881): synonym of Mioawateria extensa (Dall, 1881)
- Gymnobela fulvocincta Dautzenberg & Fischer, 1896: synonym of Gymnobela fulvotincta (Dautzenberg & Fischer, 1896)
- Gymnobela fulvotincta (Dautzenberg & Fischer, 1896): synonym of Austrobela fulvotincta (Dautzenberg & H. Fischer, 1896)
- Gymnobela gregaria Sykes, 1906: synonym of Gymnobela leptoglypta (Dautzenberg & Fischer, 1896)
- Gymnobela grundifera Dall, 1927: synonym of Daphnella grundifera (Dall, 1927)
- Gymnobela gypsata (Watson, 1881): synonym of Austrobela gypsata (R. B. Watson, 1881)
- Gymnobela holomera Locard, 1897: synonym of Gymnobela pyrrhogramma (Dautzenberg & Fischer, 1896)
- Gymnobela homeotata (Watson, 1886): synonym of Gymnobela homaeotata (Watson, 1886)
- Gymnobela imitator Dall, 1927: synonym of Pleurotomella imitator (Dall, 1927)
- Gymnobela judithae Clarke, 1989: synonym of Mioawateria extensa (Dall, 1881)
- Gymnobela leptoconchum Locard, 1897: synonym of Gymnobela emertoni (Verrill & Smith in Verrill, 1884)
- Gymnobela lyroniclea [sic]: synonym of Gymnobela lyronuclea (A.H. Clarke, 1959): synonym of Theta lyronuclea (A.H. Clarke, 1959)
- Gymnobela lyronuclea (A.H. Clarke, 1959): synonym of Theta lyronuclea (A.H. Clarke, 1959)
- Gymnobela malmii (Dall, 1889): synonym of Mioawateria malmii (Dall, 1889)
- Gymnobela micraulax Sysoev, 1997: synonym of Austrobela micraulax (Sysoev, 1997)
- Gymnobela nudator (Locard, 1897): synonym of Bathybela nudator (Locard, 1897)
- Gymnobela pinguis Locard, 1897: synonym of Gymnobela aquilarum (Watson, 1882)
- Gymnobela procera Sysoev & Bouchet, 2001: synonym of Austrobela procera (Sysoev & Bouchet, 2001)
- † Gymnobela pusula (Laws, 1947): synonym of † Acanthodaphne pusula (Laws, 1947)
- Gymnobela pycnoides Dautzenberg & Fischer, 1896: synonym of Mioawateria malmii (Dall, 1889)
- Gymnobela pyrrhogramma (Dautzenberg & Fischer, 1896): synonym of Austrobela pyrrhogramma (Dautzenberg & H. Fischer, 1896)
- Gymnobela recondita Tiberi, 1869: synonym of Gymnobela pyrrhogramma (Dautzenberg & Fischer, 1896)
- Gymnobela rhomboidea Thiele, 1925: synonym of Mioawateria rhomboidea (Thiele, 1925)
- Gymnobela sibogae (Schepman, 1913): synonym of Spergo sibogae Schepman, 1913
- Gymnobela subangulata Verrill, 1884: synonym of Gymnobela aquilarum (Watson, 1882)
- Gymnobela tenelluna (Locard, 1897): synonym of Bathybela tenelluna (Locard, 1897)
- Gymnobela tenellunum [sic]: synonym of Gymnobela tenelluna (Locard, 1897): synonym of Bathybela tenelluna (Locard, 1897)
- Gymnobela tincta Verrill, 1885: synonym of Gymnobela emertoni (Verrill & Smith in Verrill, 1884)
- Gymnobela vayssierei (Dautzenberg, 1925): synonym of Theta vayssierei (Dautzenberg, 1925)
- Gymnobela virgo (Okutani, 1966): synonym of Bathytoma virgo (Okutani, 1966)
- Gymnobela watsoni (Dautzenberg, 1889): synonym of Mioawateria watsoni (Dautzenberg, 1889)
