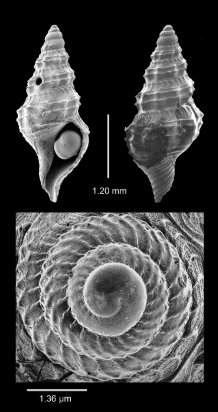
- Shell and protoconch of Gymnobela illicita (syntype at the Smithsonian Institution)

Scientific classification
- Kingdom: Animalia
- Phylum: Mollusca
- Class: Gastropoda
- Subclass: Caenogastropoda
- Order: Neogastropoda
- Superfamily: Conoidea
- Family: Raphitomidae
- Genus: Gymnobela
- Species: G. illicita

Binomial name
- Gymnobela illicita W. H. Dall, 1927

= Gymnobela illicita =

Species of gastropod

Gymnobela illicita is a species of sea snail, a marine gastropod mollusk in the family Raphitomidae.

== Description ==
The length of the shell attains 3.5 mm, its diamerter 1.2 mm.

(Original description) The minute, white shell has brown sinusigera protoconch consisting of 2½ whorls, followed by four subsequent whorls. The spire is acute, the suture appressed, somewhat constricted. The anal fasciole is rather wide, crossed by retractively concave wrinkles. The axial sculpture consists of about 10 prominent ribs, wider and slightly angulate at the periphery, varying in number in different specimens, up to 12, and extending nearly across the whorls, but obsolete on the base and on the anal fasciole. The spiral sculpture consists of two or three prominent threads near the periphery, overriding the ribs and half a dozen smaller ones on the base. The base is moderately convex. The aperture is subovate. The outer lip is thin and protractively arcuate. The columella is obliquely truncate in front. The siphonal canal is rather wide and slightly recurved.

== Distribution ==
This species occurs in the Atlantic Ocean off Georgia - Florida, USA
