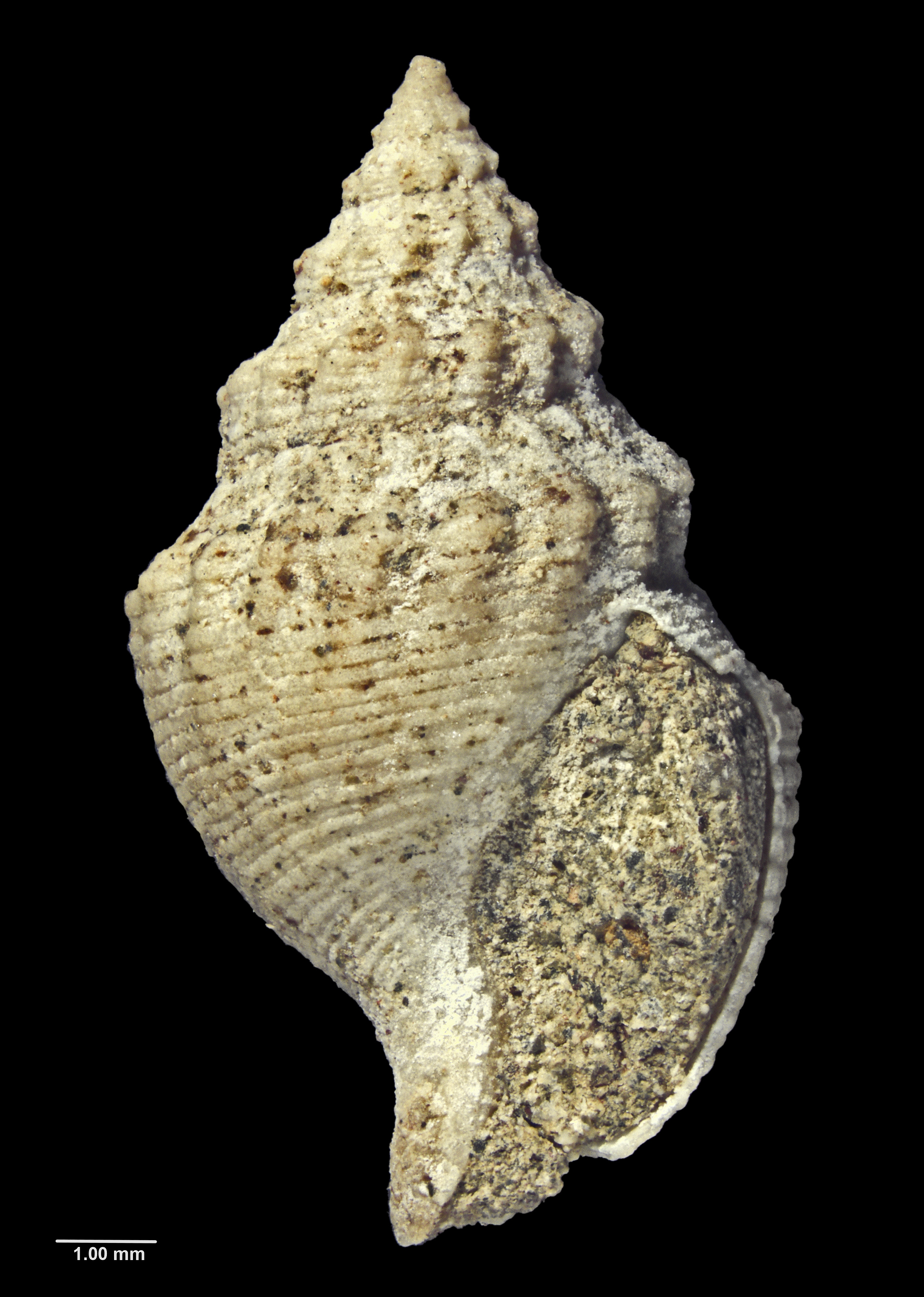
- Holotype from Auckland War Memorial Museum

Scientific classification
- Kingdom: Animalia
- Phylum: Mollusca
- Class: Gastropoda
- Subclass: Caenogastropoda
- Order: Neogastropoda
- Family: Raphitomidae
- Genus: Gymnobela
- Species: †G. carinaria

Binomial name
- †Gymnobela carinaria (A. W. B. Powell, 1935)

Synonyms
- Marshallena carinaria A. W. B. Powell, 1935

= Gymnobela carinaria =

Gymnobela carinaria Temporal range: early Miocene

Extinct species of gastropod

Gymnobela carinaria is an extinct species of sea snail, a marine gastropod mollusc, in the family Raphitomidae. Fossils of the species date to early Miocene strata of the west coast of the Auckland Region.

== Description ==
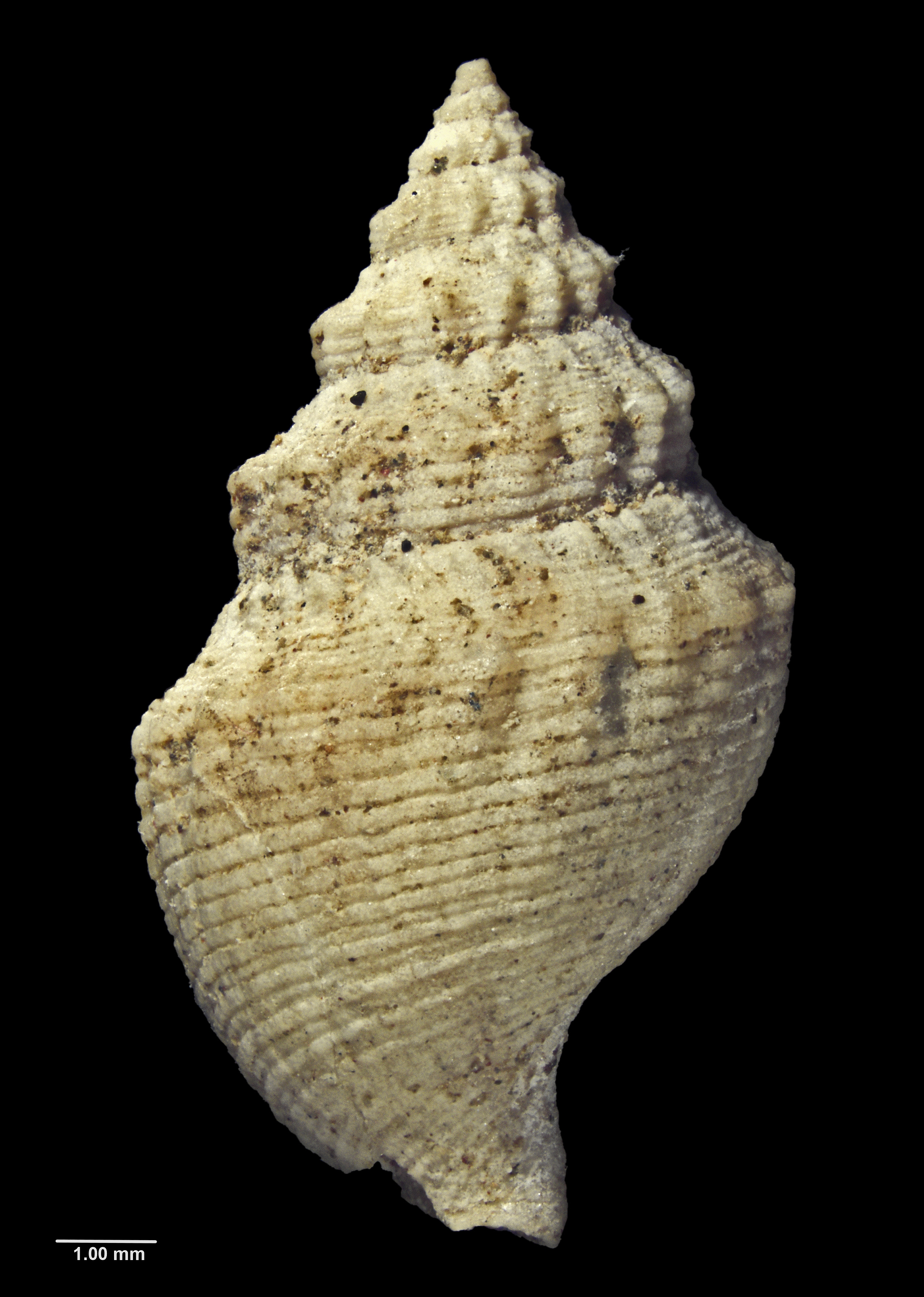
Reverse view of holotype

In the original description, Powell described the species as follows:

Shell small, broadly fusiform, sculptured with numerous rounded spiral cords having linear interspaces and prominent closely spaced oblique axial folds. Whorls angled at periphery, which is situated at the lower third on the first post-nuclear whorl, but rises to very little below the middle on the penultimate. There are eight whorls, including a typical tiny smooth proto-conch of 2 1/2 whorls. The spiral cords number eight on the second post-nuclear whorl and eleven on the penultimate, those above the periphery (five) being finer and less distinct, and there are about forty on the body-whorl, base and canal neck. The axial folds number 17, both on the penultimate and on the body-whorl. Spire turriculate, about equal to height of aperture plus canal. Aperture ovate, canal bent to the left, rather short, damaged. Suture impressed, bordered below by a rounded spiral fold that is crenulated slightly by the axial folds, which are strongly developed only from the periphery to the lower suture.

The holotype of the species measures 12 mm (0.47 in) in length and has a diameter of 6.75 mm (0.266 in). It differs from Marshallaria spiralis due to having less bulge, and more sharply angular whorls.

== Taxonomy ==
The species was first described by A. W. B. Powell in 1935 as Marshallena carinaria. It was identified as tentatively a member of the genus Gymnobela by Phillip Alan Maxwell in a posthumous 2009 publication, based on the presence of decussate sculpture on the protoconch of other type specimens collected from the type location. Since 2009, Gymnobela carinaria has become the currently accepted name for the species.

The holotype was collected at an unknown date prior to 1935 from between Powell Bay and Bartrum Bay, 2 km (1.2 mi) south of Muriwai, Auckland Region (then more commonly known as Motutara), and is held in the collections of Auckland War Memorial Museum.

== Distribution and habitat ==
This extinct marine species occurs in early Miocene strata of the Nihotupu Formation of New Zealand, on the west coast of the Waitākere Ranges of the Auckland Region, New Zealand.
