= Gymnobela fredericqae =

Scientific classification
- Kingdom: Animalia
- Phylum: Mollusca
- Class: Gastropoda
- Subclass: Caenogastropoda
- Order: Neogastropoda
- Superfamily: Conoidea
- Family: Raphitomidae
- Genus: Gymnobela
- Species: G. fredericqae

Binomial name
- Gymnobela fredericqae Garcia, 2005

Species of gastropod

Gymnobela fredericqae is a species of sea snail, a marine gastropod mollusk in the family Raphitomidae.

== Description ==
The length of the shell attains 10 mm.

== Distribution ==
G. fredericqae can be found in the Gulf of Mexico, off the coast of Louisiana.
