= Gymnobela petiti =

Scientific classification
- Kingdom: Animalia
- Phylum: Mollusca
- Class: Gastropoda
- Subclass: Caenogastropoda
- Order: Neogastropoda
- Superfamily: Conoidea
- Family: Raphitomidae
- Genus: Gymnobela
- Species: G. petiti

Binomial name
- Gymnobela petiti Garcia, 2005

Species of gastropod

Gymnobela petiti is a species of sea snail, a marine gastropod mollusk in the family Raphitomidae.

== Description ==
The length of the shell attains 15 mm.

== Distribution ==
G. petiti can be found in Caribbean waters, off the western coast of Dry Tortugas.
