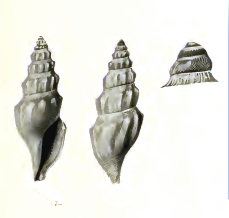
- Original image of a shell of Gymnobela dubia

Scientific classification
- Kingdom: Animalia
- Phylum: Mollusca
- Class: Gastropoda
- Subclass: Caenogastropoda
- Order: Neogastropoda
- Superfamily: Conoidea
- Family: Raphitomidae
- Genus: Gymnobela
- Species: G. dubia

Binomial name
- Gymnobela dubia (Schepman, 1913)

Synonyms
- Pleurotomella dubia Schepman, 1913

= Gymnobela dubia =

Species of gastropod

Gymnobela dubia is a species of sea snail, a marine gastropod mollusk in the family Raphitomidae.

== Description ==
The length of the shell attains 16¾ mm, its diameter 6½ mm.

(Original description) The thin, fusiform shell is transparently white. It contains about 9 whorls of which about 3 form a reddish-brown protoconch, with crossed riblets. The subsequent whorls are angular, the upper part excavated, with remote, faint, axial plicae below the suture, nearly lacking in the body whorl. The lower part shows rounded, more or less oblique ribs, ending above, just below the excavation, in bluntly pointed tubercles, 13 or 14 on the body whorl. Otherwise this lower part is smooth, but for numerous growth-striae and a few, scarcely appreciable, spiral striae. Near the base of the body whorl however and especially on the rather long, narrow siphonal canal, numerous spirals make their appearance. The aperture is elongately ovate, with a sharp angle above, a narrow gutter-like siphonal canal below. The peristome is thin (broken), according to growth-lines with a wide, shallow sinus above. The columellar margin is rather straight, with a thin layer of enamel.

== Distribution ==
This marine species was found in the Ceram Sea, Indonesia, at a depth of 835 mm.
