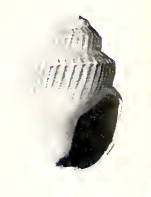
- Original image of a shell of Gymnobela brachis

Scientific classification
- Kingdom: Animalia
- Phylum: Mollusca
- Class: Gastropoda
- Subclass: Caenogastropoda
- Order: Neogastropoda
- Superfamily: Conoidea
- Family: Raphitomidae
- Genus: Gymnobela
- Species: G. brachis

Binomial name
- Gymnobela brachis (Dall, 1919)

Synonyms
- Lora brachis Dall, 1919

= Gymnobela brachis =

Species of gastropod

Gymnobela brachis is a species of sea snail, a marine gastropod mollusk in the family Raphitomidae.

== Description ==
The length of the shell attains 4.5 mm, its diameter 3.3 mm.

(Original description) The small, short, stout, blunt shell contains about 4½ whorls. The anal fasciole slopes toward a carinate beaded shoulder, retractively wrinkled between the distinct suture and a nearly median thread. The axial sculpture consists of (on the body whorl about 30) small, narrow, protractive equal ribs with subequal interspaces, obsolete on the base, each beginning at a bead on the carina. The spiral sculpture consists of fine sharp equal and equidistant striae covering the shell in front of the carina, cutting minutely the summits of the ribs, with wider flattish interspaces. The aperture is rather wide and simple. The siphonal canal is short, deep and recurved.

== Distribution ==
This marine species occurs off the Galapagos Islands.
