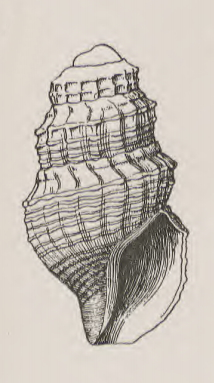
- Original drawing of a shell of Gymnobela vicella

Scientific classification
- Kingdom: Animalia
- Phylum: Mollusca
- Class: Gastropoda
- Subclass: Caenogastropoda
- Order: Neogastropoda
- Superfamily: Conoidea
- Family: Raphitomidae
- Genus: Gymnobela
- Species: G. vicella

Binomial name
- Gymnobela vicella (Dall, 1908)

Synonyms
- Gemmula vicella Dall, 1908

= Gymnobela vicella =

Species of gastropod

Gymnobela vicella is a species of sea snail, a marine gastropod mollusk in the family Raphitomidae.

== Description ==
The length of the (decollate) shell attains 8.5 mm, its diameter 4.5 mm.

(Original description) The small, stout shell is subturrited. The nuclear whorls are eroded. The spire is longer than the aperture, with about six whorls in addition to the nucleus. The color of the shell is white with a gray, olivaceous periostracum, the aspect much like a stumpy Bela Leach, 1847. The suture is distinct, not oppressed. The whorl in front of it is slightly constricted, sloping to a prominent keel at the shoulder. This slope is apparently coincident with the anal fasciole and is sculptured only by curved lines of growth and faint indications of axial ribs, which become more prominent in front of the shoulder. They become stronger on the earlier whorls and number about fifteen on the penultimate whorl. These ribs are feeble, with wider interspaces, rounded, and protective, becoming obsolete on the base and most of the body whorl. The spiral sculpture is strongest in the shoulder keel, which is a little nodulous where it crosses the ribs. In front of it are three to five spiral threads (on the spire) of which the second is strongest and faintly nodulous, the others feebler, more adjacent and simple These become more numerous by intercalation, the body whorl having about sixteen between the keel and the end of the siphonal canal. The lines of growth are rather strong and give the surface a rough appearance.;The aperture is short. The anal sulcus is shallow and feeble The outer lip is sharp, thin and simple. The columella is smooth, short and obliquely attenuated. The twisted siphonal canal is wide, short, funicular and slightly recurved.

== Distribution ==
This marine species occurs in the Gulf of Panama.
