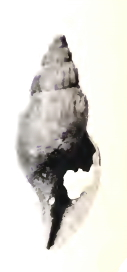
- Original image of a shell of Gymnobela leptoglypta

Scientific classification
- Kingdom: Animalia
- Phylum: Mollusca
- Class: Gastropoda
- Subclass: Caenogastropoda
- Order: Neogastropoda
- Superfamily: Conoidea
- Family: Raphitomidae
- Genus: Gymnobela
- Species: G. leptoglypta

Binomial name
- Gymnobela leptoglypta (Dautzenberg & Fischer, 1896)

Synonyms
- Gymnobela gregaria Sykes, 1906; Pleurotoma leptoglypta Dautzenberg & Fischer, 1896; Pleurotomella gregaria Sykes, 1906

= Gymnobela leptoglypta =

Species of gastropod

Gymnobela leptoglypta is a species of sea snail, a marine gastropod mollusk in the family Raphitomidae.

== Description ==
The length of the shell attains 4.5 mm.

The somewhat thin shell has a well-elevated spire. Its color is white with the protoconch stained with brown. The shell contains six evenly roundedwhorls, four being apical. The apical whorls (in a worn state) are reticulate, and the residue of the shell is sculptured with longitudinal ribs, which fade out on the lower half of the whorls. There are also numerous rounded spirals cutting the ribs. Below the suture there is an excavated area, showing spirals and also arcuate striae, more numerous than the ribs. The columella is fairly straight. The aperture is ovate.

== Distribution ==
This marine species occurs off the Azores and in the Rockall Trough.
