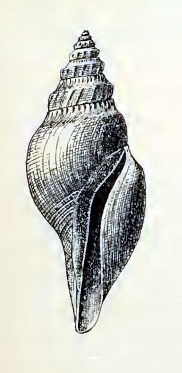
- Original image of a shell of Gymnobela daphnelloides

Scientific classification
- Kingdom: Animalia
- Phylum: Mollusca
- Class: Gastropoda
- Subclass: Caenogastropoda
- Order: Neogastropoda
- Superfamily: Conoidea
- Family: Raphitomidae
- Genus: Gymnobela
- Species: G. daphnelloides

Binomial name
- Gymnobela daphnelloides (Dall, 1895)

Synonyms
- Gymnobela (Theta) daphnelloides (Dall, 1896); Mangilia (Spergo) daphnelloides Dall, 1895; Spergo daphnelloides Dall, 1895

= Gymnobela daphnelloides =

Species of gastropod

Gymnobela daphnelloides is a species of sea snail, a marine gastropod mollusk in the family Raphitomidae.

== Description ==
The length of the shell attains 23 mm, its diameter 10 mm.

(Original description) The small, thin, polished shell has a pointed simisigera protoconch of 3½ whorls and six subsequent whorls. The protoconch is bright yellow-brown, often caducous, leaving the white internal callus to represent it, which being molded on the interior of the protoconch whorls, is polished and smooth, while the original protoconch has an oblique reticular curved sculpture. The sculpture is much like that of Spergo glandiniformis, but having the whorls appressed at the suture lower on the antecedent whorl, the riblets more prominent, less oblique, and higher on the whorl, the fasciole more deeply impressed and its sculpture indicating a deeper sinus, and the fine spiral grooving continuous and uniform over the whole surface of the shell. The whorls are rounded, the body whorl inflated with the outer lip greatly produced, as in Daphnella, and the sinus pronounced. The columella is straight and brown tinted. The siphonal canal is shallow and narrow. The outer lip is thin, smooth and glassy within, sharp edged.

== Distribution ==
This marine species occurs off Hawaii and East Africa.
