= Gymnobela angulosa =

Scientific classification
- Kingdom: Animalia
- Phylum: Mollusca
- Class: Gastropoda
- Subclass: Caenogastropoda
- Order: Neogastropoda
- Superfamily: Conoidea
- Family: Raphitomidae
- Genus: Gymnobela
- Species: G. angulosa

Binomial name
- Gymnobela angulosa Sysoev, 1988

Species of gastropod

Gymnobela angulosa is a species of sea snail, a marine gastropod mollusk in the family Raphitomidae.

== Distribution ==
This bathyal marine species was found in the Bougainville Trench, New Guinea
