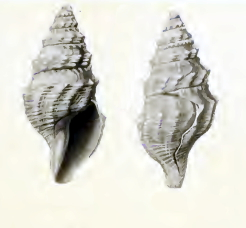
- Original image of a shell of Gymnobela pulchra

Scientific classification
- Kingdom: Animalia
- Phylum: Mollusca
- Class: Gastropoda
- Subclass: Caenogastropoda
- Order: Neogastropoda
- Superfamily: Conoidea
- Family: Raphitomidae
- Genus: Gymnobela
- Species: G. pulchra

Binomial name
- Gymnobela pulchra (Schepman, 1913)

Synonyms
- Surcula pulchra Schepman, 1913

= Gymnobela pulchra =

Species of gastropod

Gymnobela pulchra is a species of sea snail, a marine gastropod mollusk in the family Raphitomidae.

== Description ==
The length of the shell attains 17.5 millimetres (0.69 in), its diameter 8 millimetres (0.31 in).

The white, shortly fusiform shell is rather thin. It has a short siphonal canal and a pyramidal spire. The protoconch is wanting. The six remaining whorls are angular, separated by a conspicuous, waved suture, their upper part excavated. The sculpture consists of narrow axial ribs, 14 in the body whorl, oblique in the upper whorls, elegantly flexuous in last one and a row of oblique, short plicae, on a faint subsutural rib. The axial ribs end in rather sharp tubercles in their upper part at the limit of excavation. The ribs are crossed by narrow spiral lirae, 3 more conspicuous and some fainter ones on the penultimate whorl, numerous, rather unequal ones on the body whorl. Crossing the ribs produces still 2 fainter tubercles on the lirae of the penultimate whorl. Numerous ones on the body whorl, but not on the siphonal canal, where the ribs disappear. Moreover, the shell is crossed by very fine growth striae, more conspicuous in excavation and fine spiral striae, of which about 2 in excavation. The aperture is oval, angular above, ending in a short, wide siphonal canal below, slightly directed to the left. The peristome is thin and broken, according to growth lines with a moderately wide and deep sinus, then protracted columellar margin concave above, slightly tortuous at the canal, with a thin layer of enamel. The interior of the aperture is smooth and white.

== Distribution ==
The species occurs in the Banda Sea, Indonesia.
