= Gymnobela africana =

Scientific classification
- Kingdom: Animalia
- Phylum: Mollusca
- Class: Gastropoda
- Subclass: Caenogastropoda
- Order: Neogastropoda
- Superfamily: Conoidea
- Family: Raphitomidae
- Genus: Gymnobela
- Species: G. africana

Binomial name
- Gymnobela africana Sysoev, 1996

Synonyms
- Gymnobela (Bathybela) africana Sysoev, 1996 (original combination)

Species of gastropod

Gymnobela africana is a species of sea snail, a marine gastropod mollusk in the family Raphitomidae.

== Description ==
The length of the shell attains 54.7 mm, its diameter 22.7 mm.

== Distribution ==
This marine species occurs off Kenya.
