= Mioawateria extensa =

Scientific classification
- Kingdom: Animalia
- Phylum: Mollusca
- Class: Gastropoda
- Subclass: Caenogastropoda
- Order: Neogastropoda
- Superfamily: Conoidea
- Family: Raphitomidae
- Genus: Mioawateria
- Species: M. extensa

Binomial name
- Mioawateria extensa (Dall, 1881)

Synonyms
- Defrancia streptophora Watson, R.B., 1881; Gymnobela blakeana extensa (Dall, 1881); Gymnobela judithae A. H. Clarke, 1989; Gymnobela streptophora Watson, 1881; Magnella extensa (Dall, 1881); Pleurotoma (Bela) blakeana extensa Dall, 1881 (basionym); Pleurotoma extensa Dall, 1881; Pleurotoma streptophora Watson, 1881; Pleurotomella (Gymnobela) extensa Dall, 1889

Species of gastropod

Mioawateria extensa is a species of sea snail, a marine gastropod mollusk in the family Raphitomidae.

== Description ==
The length of the shell varies between 4 mm and 12.5 mm.

The shell is in most features like Pleurotomella normalis (Dall, 1881), but more elongated, with nine whorls, the revolving threads (except the sutural ones) obsolete except near the anterior end of the body whorl. With a tendency of the thread next the suture to be stronger and more strongly knobbed than (as in the normal form) the outer one. There are twenty to twenty-five transverse threads, more numerous and in large specimens hardly noticeable except near the suture. The spire is nearly equal to the body whorl and the aperture is about one third of the shell.

== Distribution ==
M. extensa can be found in Caribbean waters, ranging from the coast of Louisiana to Cuba.
