= Gymnobela augusta =

Scientific classification
- Kingdom: Animalia
- Phylum: Mollusca
- Class: Gastropoda
- Subclass: Caenogastropoda
- Order: Neogastropoda
- Superfamily: Conoidea
- Family: Raphitomidae
- Genus: Gymnobela
- Species: G. augusta

Binomial name
- Gymnobela augusta Thiele, 1925

Synonyms
- Gymnobela (Gymnobela) augusta (Thiele, 1925)

Species of gastropod

Gymnobela augusta is a species of sea snail, a marine gastropod mollusk in the family Raphitomidae.

== Distribution ==
This marine species occurs off the Agulhas Bank, South Africa
