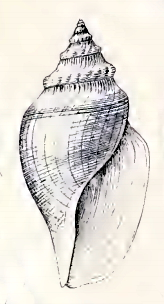
- Original image of a shell of Gymnobela emertoni

Scientific classification
- Kingdom: Animalia
- Phylum: Mollusca
- Class: Gastropoda
- Subclass: Caenogastropoda
- Order: Neogastropoda
- Superfamily: Conoidea
- Family: Raphitomidae
- Genus: Gymnobela
- Species: G. emertoni

Binomial name
- Gymnobela emertoni (Verrill & S. Smith [in Verrill), 1884)

Synonyms
- Gymnobela leptoconchum Locard, 1897; Gymnobela tincta Verrill, 1885; Pleurotoma leptoconchum Locard, 1897; Pleurotoma leptoconchum var. curta Locard, 1897; Pleurotomella emertoni Verrill, 1884; Pleurotomella tincta Verrill, 1885

= Gymnobela emertoni =

Species of gastropod

Gymnobela emertoni is a species of sea snail, a marine gastropod mollusk in the family Raphitomidae.

== Description ==
The length of the shell varies between 14 mm and 27 mm.

(Original description) The shell is moderately large, stout and ovate. The body whorl is very large in proportion to the rest of the shell. Some of the upper whorls are ribbed and nodulous, while the two lower whorls have only spiral lines and lines of growth. The shell contains about eight whorls, three of which form a chestnut-colored protoconch. About three whorls below the protoconch are covered with prominent, longitudinal ribs, which form a well marked shoulder and are crossed by several conspicuous, revolving cinguli and grooves, which render them decidedly nodulous. The subsutural band is broad, strongly concave, occupying nearly or quite half the breadth of the upper whorls, and is crossed by strongly receding, raised lines, parallel with the lines of growth of the sinus, but without spiral lines. The body whorl is large and swollen, covered throughout with very evident lines of growth, which are crossed, except on the subsutural band, by conspicuous, revolving cinguli, which are separated by spaces considerably exceeding their own breadth. The aperture is oblong-ovate, scarcely narrowed at the broad, short, open siphonal canal, and with a very wide and rather deep posterior sinus. The outer lip is thin and projects well forward beyond the sinus in a broadly rounded curve. The columella is straight, with a sinuous inner margin. The inner lip is marked by a narrow and thin enamel, which extends but little forward in a sinuous outline. The color is yellowish white under a thin, smooth, glossy, yellowish green epidermis.

== Distribution ==
This marine species occurs on the Mid-Atlantic Ridge and off New Jersey and Virginia, USA.
