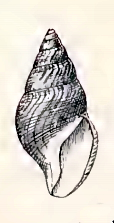
- Original image of a shell of Gymnobela frielei

Scientific classification
- Kingdom: Animalia
- Phylum: Mollusca
- Class: Gastropoda
- Subclass: Caenogastropoda
- Order: Neogastropoda
- Superfamily: Conoidea
- Family: Raphitomidae
- Genus: Gymnobela
- Species: G. frielei

Binomial name
- Gymnobela frielei (Verrill, 1885)

Synonyms
- Bela polysarca (Dautzenberg & Fischer H., 1896); Bela polysarca var. major Locard, 1897; Bela polysarca var. minor Locard, 1897; Bela polysarca var. ventricosa Locard, 1897; Gymnobela frielei major Locard, 1897; Gymnobela frielei ventricosa Dautzenberg & Fischer, 1896; Pleurotoma polysarca Dautzenberg & Fischer H., 1896; Pleurotomella frielei Verrill, 1885 (original combination); Pleurotomella guineensis Von Martens,

= Gymnobela frielei =

Species of gastropod

Gymnobela frielei is a species of sea snail, a marine gastropod mollusk in the family Raphitomidae.

== Description ==
The length of the shell attains 30 mm, its diameter 10 mm.

(Original description) The shell is of moderate size, rather thick and solid, elongate-ovate or subfusiform,. It shows a rather long, regularly tapered spire, consisting of about six whorls below the protoconch, which is small and consists of two or more whorls, eroded in our specimens. The whorls of the spire are a little convex and slightly angulated or shouldered just above the middle, and have a rather broad, slightly concave subsutural band. The body whorl is more evenly convex and the shoulder is rounded and rather indistinct. The surface is covered with numerous rather fine, flexuous riblets, parallel with the lines of growth. These curve forward on the middle of the whorl below the shoulder, but are strongly excurved in crossing the subsutural band, and become thin and more prominent just below the suture, which is distinctly impressed. The surface is also covered with very numerous thin, revolving cinguli, which are separated by intervals of about the same width. These extend over the subsutural band, but are there a little less prominent. On the convex part of the whorls they are wavy and irregularly decussated by the lines of growth. On the spire the two sets of lines produce a cancellated structure. The aperture is short and rather [broad, with an acute angle posteriorly and a short, broad, straight siphonal canal in front. The columella is short, nearly straight, with the inner edge strongly sinuous and obliquely cut away at the end. The inner lip is strongly excavated at the base of the columella. The outer lip is regularly curved, except above the shoulder, where it is slightly flattened and sloping. In the middle it projects considerably forward in a broad curve, but the posterior sinus is broad, rather deep, well-rounded, and deepest just above the shoulder. The color of the shell is grayish or yellowish white externally, bluish white within. One specimen shows a conspicuous reddish brown patch on the columella margin.

== Distribution ==
This marine species occurs off New Jersey, United States and the Azores.
