= Gymnobela erronea =

Scientific classification
- Kingdom: Animalia
- Phylum: Mollusca
- Class: Gastropoda
- Subclass: Caenogastropoda
- Order: Neogastropoda
- Superfamily: Conoidea
- Family: Raphitomidae
- Genus: Gymnobela
- Species: G. erronea

Binomial name
- Gymnobela erronea Thiele, 1925

Synonyms
- Gymnobela (Gymnobela) erronea Thiele, 1925

Species of gastropod

Gymnobela erronea is a species of sea snail, a marine gastropod mollusk in the family Raphitomidae.

== Distribution ==
This marine species occurs off East Africa.
