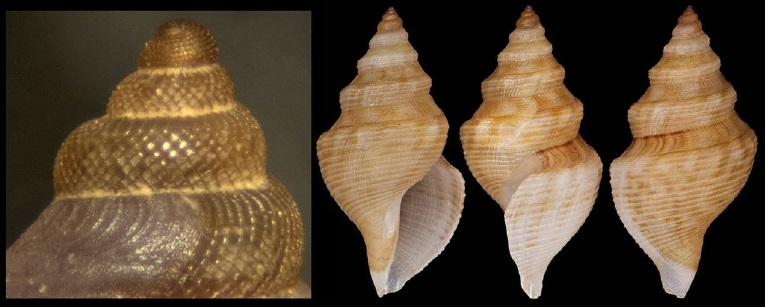
- Shell of Gymnobela abyssorum

Scientific classification
- Kingdom: Animalia
- Phylum: Mollusca
- Class: Gastropoda
- Subclass: Caenogastropoda
- Order: Neogastropoda
- Superfamily: Conoidea
- Family: Raphitomidae
- Genus: Gymnobela
- Species: G. abyssorum

Binomial name
- Gymnobela abyssorum (Locard, 1897)

Synonyms
- Bela abyssorum Locard, 1897; Mangelia abyssorum (Locard, 1897); Oenopota abyssorum (Locard, 1897); Pleurotoma (Pleurotomella) abyssorum (Locard, 1897); Pleurotomella abyssorum (Locard, 1897); Turris abyssorum (Locard, 1897)

= Gymnobela abyssorum =

Species of gastropod

Gymnobela abyssorum is a species of sea snail, a marine gastropod mollusk in the family Raphitomidae.

== Description ==
A biconical shell up to 23mm high with 6–7 shouldered whorls. Its diameter is 10 mm. Buff in colour with brownish marks.

Description. – Shell of medium size, of a slightly ovoid elongated curve, a little more developed above than below. The obtuse spire is of mediocre length. It is composed of 8 to 9 whorls growing slowly in diameter and in height. They show a slightly concave-oblique profile on almost half of the height (more than half in the upper whorls, and less than half on the penultimate whorl). Then they become almost upright or slightly convex, with a keel sensitive to the change of direction of the whorls. The body whorl measures almost two-thirds of the total length. It is a slightly concave at the top. In lateral profile, on the opposite side to the outer lip, it becomes convex, then suddenly attenuated at the base. It ends in an open wide, short and almost straight siphonal canal. The linear sutures are impressed. The small, mamillate apex is followed by 3 to 4 embryonic, well rounded and very finely decussate whorls. The aperture measures half the total length. It is subrectangular-oblique, a little more narrowed at the base, inscribed in an almost vertical plane. The peristome shows almost continuous edges. The thin and sharp outer edge is weakly projected forward, with a pleurotomoid notch at the top, perceptible though not very pronounced. Its lateral profile is as angular upwards, at the end of the keel, and then broadly convex-sloping towards the base. The columellar edge is a little arched at the top, upright towards the base where it ends pointedly. It shows in the upper part an accused callus. The solid shell is quite thick, subopaque, adorned with longitudinal ribs, decurrent cords and growth lines. It contains 18 to 19 longitudinal ribs on the penultimate whorl. These are large, rounded, spread out only on the base of whorls, mamillate at the keel, obsolete above, sometimes bifid below, slightly obliquely, very short on the body whorl, where they merge with growth lines. The decurrent striae are somewhat thin, regular, spaced, continuous, very attenuated at the top of the whorls, scarcely more marked at the base of the body whorl along the siphonal canal. The striations are strong, irregular, very wavy-flexuous. They form in the concave region of the whorls small corrugated folds, very close together. They blend in the body whorl, with the prolongation of the nodules of the keel. The color of the shell is a very light, non-glossy yellowish red, whiter on the inside.

== Distribution ==
This bathyal species (200 m to 1500 m) occurs in the Eastern Atlantic Ocean; also off the Azores in the Mediterranean Sea.
