= Gymnobela yoshidai =

Scientific classification
- Kingdom: Animalia
- Phylum: Mollusca
- Class: Gastropoda
- Subclass: Caenogastropoda
- Order: Neogastropoda
- Superfamily: Conoidea
- Family: Raphitomidae
- Genus: Gymnobela
- Species: G. yoshidai

Binomial name
- Gymnobela yoshidai (Habe, 1962)

Synonyms
- Speoides yoshidai Habe, 1962

Species of gastropod

Gymnobela yoshidai is a species of sea snail, a marine gastropod mollusk in the family Raphitomidae.

== Distribution ==
This marine species occurs off New Caledonia.
