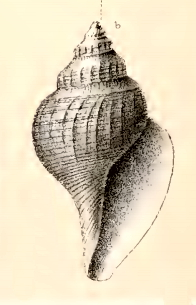
- Original image of a shell of Gymnobela phyxanor

Scientific classification
- Kingdom: Animalia
- Phylum: Mollusca
- Class: Gastropoda
- Subclass: Caenogastropoda
- Order: Neogastropoda
- Superfamily: Conoidea
- Family: Raphitomidae
- Genus: Gymnobela
- Species: G. phyxanor

Binomial name
- Gymnobela phyxanor (R.B. Watson, 1886)

Synonyms
- Clathurella phyxanor R.B. Watson, 1886

= Gymnobela phyxanor =

Species of gastropod

Gymnobela phyxanor is a species of sea snail, a marine gastropod mollusk in the family Raphitomidae.

== Etymology ==
From the ancient Greek word "phyxanor", man-avoiding, so called from the depth and distance of its dwelling.

== Description ==
The height of the shell attains 12.7 mm, its diameter 7.1 mm.

(Original description) The thin, white, tumid, subequally biconical shell is subangulated and cancellated, with longitudinal and spiral threads. It is subscalar, with a squat, conical, small, yellow-tipped spire, an impressed suture, a tumid body whorl, a short rounded base, and a triangular, small-pointed, longish, one-sided aperture.

Sculpture : Longitudinals—below the suture the whorls are closely scored with little concave bars, the cusps of the old sinuses. Below these bars, above the angle of the shell, there originate oblique threads, which at the angle become nearly perpendicular. On the spire these form little tubercled riblets, of which there are about 25 on the penultimate whorl, but on the body whorl they become somewhat obsolete. They are parted by broad shallow intervals. Besides these there are numerous coarse but feeble growth lines. Spirals—the upper whorls are angulated below the sinus-area. Close to this angulation, both above and below, there are 3 or 4 unequal but rather weak threads. On the side of the whorls are three flat strongish threads, on the body whorl these all are less distinct, and the whole base and aperture are covered with flat, broad threads, and very slight, shallow, squarish furrows. Where these threads cross the longitudinals they tend, especially on the upper whorls, to rise into small tubercles. The colour of the shell is white.

The spire is rather squat, but conical and small-topped. On the apex seem to have been about 3½ or 4 small, conical, turbinate whorls, but the tip is crushed. They are scored with very short little bars above, which split into reticulations below. The shell contains four whorls besides the apex. They have a sloping shoulder above, are angulately keeled about the middle, below this they are convexly cylindrical, with a very slight amount of contraction into the suture. The body whorl is tumid, with a short rounded base, produced into a smallish, rather long, subtriangular truncated snout. The suture is almost horizontal, a little impressed. The aperture is oval, very slightly angulated above, and drawn out into a short oblique siphonal canal in front. The outer lip is thin, well arched, slightly flattened along the siphonal canal. It has a deep, wide, open sinus above, which is barely separated from the suture by a minute ledge. From the sinus the lip-edge sweeps forward with a great wing-like curve, and then bends back to the edge of the siphonal canal. There is a very thin glaze on the body of the inner lip, and here the line of the lip is quite flat. At the base of the columella it is bluntly obtuse, after which it runs straight forward; the point of the pillar is barely cut off, but the lip-edge twists out in a long-drawn continuous line.

== Distribution ==
This species occurs in the Mid-Atlantic.
