= Gymnobela xaioca =

Scientific classification
- Kingdom: Animalia
- Phylum: Mollusca
- Class: Gastropoda
- Subclass: Caenogastropoda
- Order: Neogastropoda
- Superfamily: Conoidea
- Family: Raphitomidae
- Genus: Gymnobela
- Species: G. xaioca

Binomial name
- Gymnobela xaioca Figueira & Absalão, 2012

Species of gastropod

Gymnobela xaioca is a species of sea snail, a marine gastropod mollusk in the family Raphitomidae.

== Distribution ==
This marine species occurs in the Campos Basin, southeast Brazil.
