= Gymnobela dautzenbergi =

Scientific classification
- Kingdom: Animalia
- Phylum: Mollusca
- Class: Gastropoda
- Subclass: Caenogastropoda
- Order: Neogastropoda
- Superfamily: Conoidea
- Family: Raphitomidae
- Genus: Gymnobela
- Species: G. dautzenbergi

Binomial name
- Gymnobela dautzenbergi (Knudsen, 1952)

Synonyms
- Cythara dautzenbergi Knudsen, 1952

Species of gastropod

Gymnobela dautzenbergi is a species of sea snail, a marine gastropod mollusk in the family Raphitomidae.

== Description ==
The length of the shell attains 10 mm.

== Distribution ==
This marine species occurs off Mauretania.
