= Gymnobela subaraneosa =

Scientific classification
- Kingdom: Animalia
- Phylum: Mollusca
- Class: Gastropoda
- Subclass: Caenogastropoda
- Order: Neogastropoda
- Superfamily: Conoidea
- Family: Raphitomidae
- Genus: Gymnobela
- Species: G. subaraneosa

Binomial name
- Gymnobela subaraneosa (Dautzenberg & Fischer, 1896)

Synonyms
- Pleurotoma subaraneosa Dautzenberg & Fischer, 1896

Species of gastropod

Gymnobela subaraneosa is a species of sea snail, a marine gastropod mollusk in the family Raphitomidae.
