= Gymnobela muricata =

Scientific classification
- Kingdom: Animalia
- Phylum: Mollusca
- Class: Gastropoda
- Subclass: Caenogastropoda
- Order: Neogastropoda
- Superfamily: Conoidea
- Family: Raphitomidae
- Genus: Gymnobela
- Species: G. muricata

Binomial name
- Gymnobela muricata Sysoev, 1997

Species of gastropod

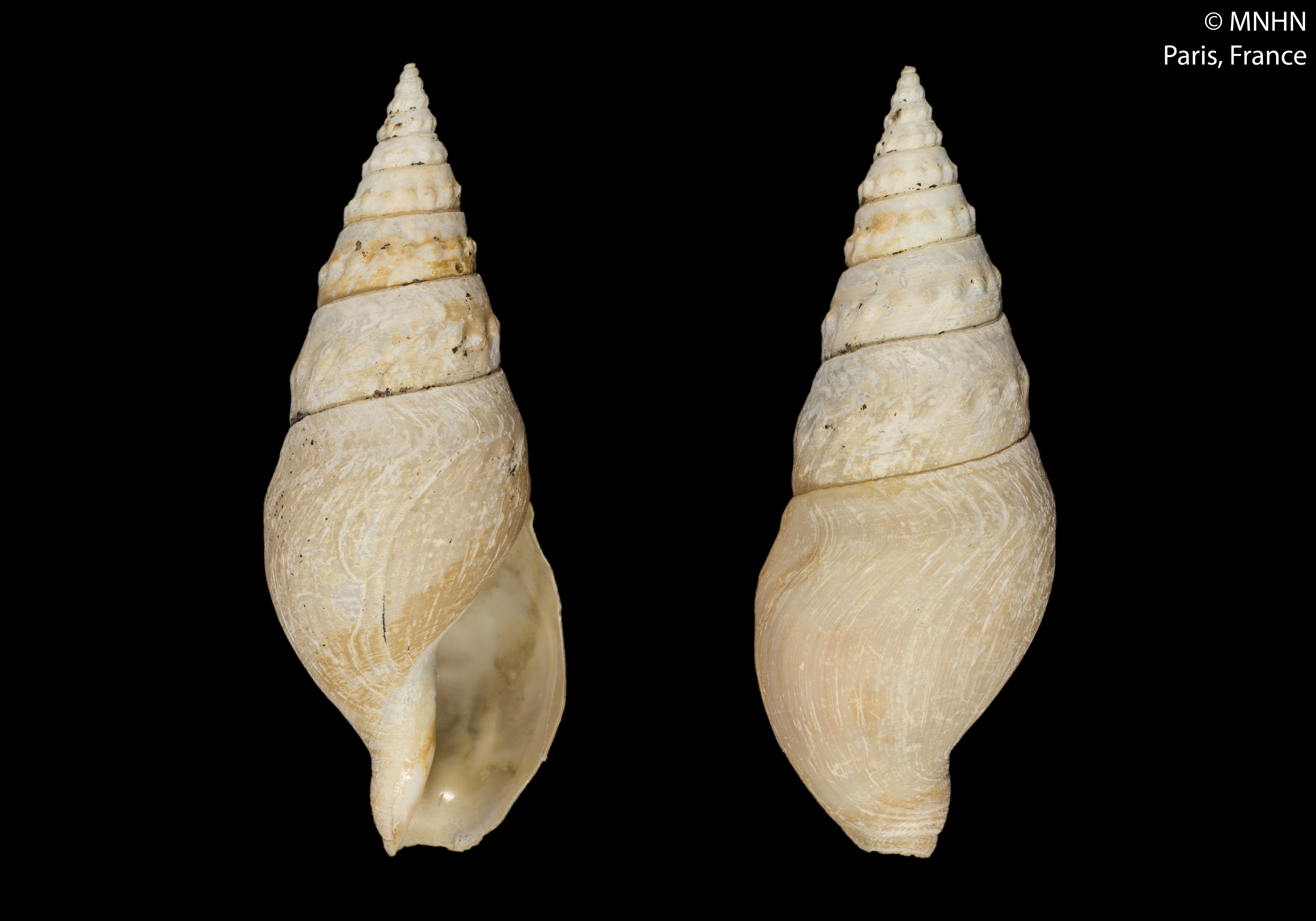

Gymnobela muricata is a species of sea snail, a marine gastropod mollusk in the family Raphitomidae.

== Description ==
The length of the shell attains 69.1 mm, its diameter is 25.7 mm.

== Distribution ==
This marine species occurs off the Tanimbar Islands, Indonesia and in the Arafura Sea, at depths between 836 m - 891 m.
