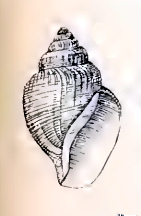
- Shell of Gymnobela aquilarum

Scientific classification
- Kingdom: Animalia
- Phylum: Mollusca
- Class: Gastropoda
- Subclass: Caenogastropoda
- Order: Neogastropoda
- Superfamily: Conoidea
- Family: Raphitomidae
- Genus: Gymnobela
- Species: G. aquilarum

Binomial name
- Gymnobela aquilarum (Watson, 1882)

Synonyms
- Buccinum aquilarum Watson, 1882; Gymnobela curta Verrill, 1884 (synonym); Gymnobela curta var. subangulata Verrill, 1884 (synonym); Gymnobela pinguis Locard, 1897; Gymnobela subangulata Verrill, 1884; Pleurotoma brevis Verrill, 1885 (synonym); Pleurotoma pingue Locard, 1897; Pleurotoma pinguis Jeffreys, 1880; Pleurotomella curta (A. E. Verrill, 1884)

= Gymnobela aquilarum =

Species of gastropod

Gymnobela aquilarum is a species of sea snail, a marine gastropod mollusk in the family Raphitomidae.

== Description ==
The length of the shell attains 16 mm, its diameter 9.5 mm.

The small, short shell has a fusiform, or subovate shape, with a low spire and very large body whorl, forming about three-fourths the total length. The surface is finely decussated by longitudinal and spiral lines of nearly equal size. There are four whorls below the protoconch, very rapidly increasing, strongly convex, but frequently slightly flattened at the periphery, and sometimes distinctly angulated at the shoulder, but more commonly evenly rounded. The body whorl is very ventricose. The suture is strongly impressed, often slightly channelled. The protoconch consists of two or three small, light chestnut-brown whorls, with very finely cancellated sculpture. The apical whorl is very small and regularly coiled. The sculpture on the rest of the shell consists of numerous, rather fine, thin, regular revolving cinguli, which are separated by interspaces about twice their own breadth on the lower whorls, but more crowded on the upper ones. Two or three of the cinguli on the shoulder are usually coarser and a little farther apart than the rest, and the largest of these often forms a slight carina around the most prominent part of the shoulder. On the subsutural band the cinguli are less distinct and less regular, and often partially obsolete. Anteriorly they cover all the surface to the tip of the siphonal canal. The cinguli are everywhere crossed by very numerous and regular, thin, raised lines or riblets, which are usually of nearly the same size as the cinguli, but frequently are somewhat less conspicuous and a little farther apart. The riblets are nearly straight on the periphery of the whorls, but are somewhat angularly bent at the shoulder, and run obliquely forward across the subsutural band to the suture. On the subsutural band they are distinctly elevated, but rather thinner than elsewhere. By the crossing of these two sets of lines the surface is generally finely and regularly cancellated, except on the shoulder and subsutural band, where the cancellation becomes more or less irregular or indistinct. The aperture is rather large, broad-ovate, a little angulated at the shoulder, and with a very slight constriction at the base of the very short and rather narrow siphonal canal. The posterior sinus is nearly obsolete, and indicated only by a shallow indentation just above the shoulder. The columella is short, straight, its inner margin with a rather strong sigmoid curvature. The siphonal canal is nearly straight, very slightly recurved at the tip, narrowed by a slight constriction of the outer lip, at its base. The epidermis is thin, not very distinct. The color of the fresh alcoholic specimens is pale grayish or greenish white, more or less translucent.

== Distribution ==
This marine species occurs off the Azores.
