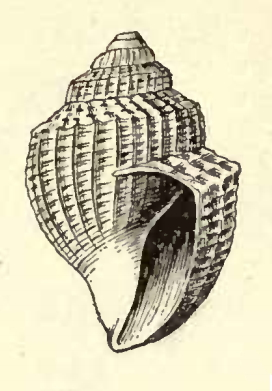
- Original image of a shell of Gymnobela blakeana

Scientific classification
- Kingdom: Animalia
- Phylum: Mollusca
- Class: Gastropoda
- Subclass: Caenogastropoda
- Order: Neogastropoda
- Superfamily: Conoidea
- Family: Raphitomidae
- Genus: Gymnobela
- Species: G. blakeana

Binomial name
- Gymnobela blakeana (Dall, 1881)

Synonyms
- Gymnobela brevis Verrill, 1885; Pleurotoma (Bela) blakeana Dall, 1881; Pleurotomella (Gymnobela) blakeana (Dall, 1889)

= Gymnobela blakeana =

Species of gastropod

Gymnobela blakeana is a species of sea snail, a marine gastropod mollusk in the family Raphitomidae.

Subspecies: Gymnobela blakeana agria (Dall, 1889) (synonym: Pleurotomella (Gymnobela) blakeana agria Dall, 1889)

== Description ==
(Original description) The shell is very variable in proportions and somewhat variable in sculpture. It is thin, white, with a dark protoconch, a rather acute spire, a short columella and rather wide aperture . The sculpture consists of revolving threads, two stronger ones immediately in front of the suture, which are nodulated at their intersection with the ribs with sixteen to eighteen transverse ribs which are strongest near the suture and fade away toward the siphonal canal. The notch is subobsolete. The shell shows the waxy polish characteristic of so many abyssal forms.

== Distribution ==
G. blakeana can be found in Atlantic and Caribbean waters, ranging from the coast of Massachusetts south to the Yucatan.
