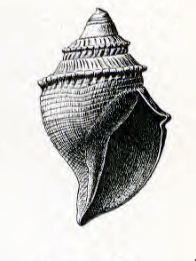
- Original image of a shell of Gymnobela isogonia

Scientific classification
- Kingdom: Animalia
- Phylum: Mollusca
- Class: Gastropoda
- Subclass: Caenogastropoda
- Order: Neogastropoda
- Superfamily: Conoidea
- Family: Raphitomidae
- Genus: Gymnobela
- Species: G. isogonia

Binomial name
- Gymnobela isogonia (Dall, 1908)

Synonyms
- Pleurotomella (Gymnobela) isogonia Dall, 1908

= Gymnobela isogonia =

Species of mollusc

Gymnobela isogonia is a species of sea snail, a marine gastropod mollusk in the family Raphitomidae.

== Description ==
The length of the shell attains 13 mm, its diameter 7.7 mm.

(Original description) The short, stout, biconic shell is white or subtranslucent with a yellowish periostracum. The apical whorls are much eroded, indicating for the whole shell six or more whorls. The suture is appressed; the whorl in front of it steeply descends to a very strong keel at the shoulder, behind which it is slightly excavated. This area is spirally sculptured with numerous, very fine, close-set threads, one of which, two-thirds of the way to the keel, is more prominent than the others. These are crossed by numerous rather irregular low sharp ridges strongest near the keel, which they nodulate more or less, especially on the earlier whorls, and, fading out toward the suture, faintly reticulating the spirals. The keel is high, sharply compressed below, with a rounded edge. The whorl in front of it is spirally sculptured with numerous flat low ridges with narrower channelled interspaces. The ridges are crossed by fine sharp lines of growth and occasional faint vertical folds, low and obsolete except near their beginning in front of the keel. The body is polished, with the sculpture erased. The outer lip is angulated and notched by the keel, thin, sharp, simple. The columella is short, white, with a faint brown band around it. The anterior portion is acute, and obliquely truncate. The siphonal canal is short and slightly recurved.

== Distribution ==
This marine species occurs in the Gulf of Panama.
