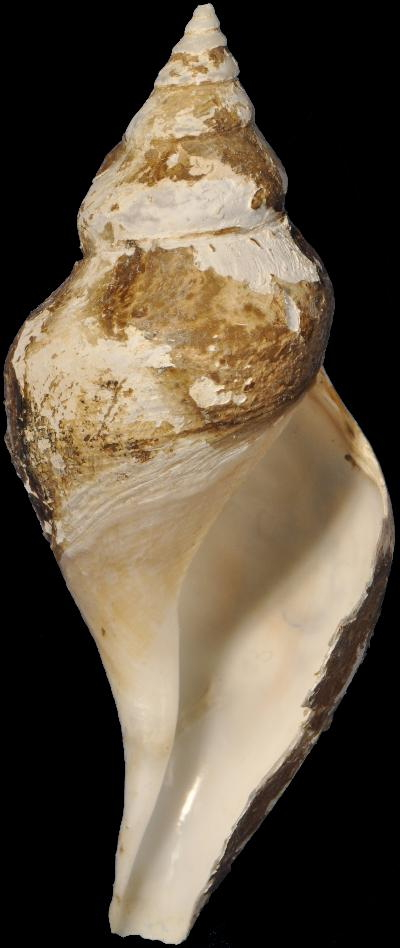
- Shell of Gymnobela edgariana (specimen in MNHN, Paris)

Scientific classification
- Kingdom: Animalia
- Phylum: Mollusca
- Class: Gastropoda
- Subclass: Caenogastropoda
- Order: Neogastropoda
- Superfamily: Conoidea
- Family: Raphitomidae
- Genus: Gymnobela
- Species: G. edgariana

Binomial name
- Gymnobela edgariana (Dall, 1889)

Synonyms
- Mangilia edgariana Dall, 1889 (original combination); Pleurotomella edgariana (Dall, 1889)

= Gymnobela edgariana =

Species of gastropod

Gymnobela edgariana is a species of sea snail, a marine gastropod mollusk in the family Raphitomidae.

== Description ==
The length of the shell varies between 35 mm and 64 mm.

(Original description) The large, shell isstraw-colored with a tinge of rufous about the margin of the anal sulcus outside. It contains 10-11 whorls (seven remaining, protoconch and first normal whorl broken away). The whorls are keeled or angulated at the periphery, the keel not riblike or sharp, but lightly rounded. In the first small whorls it is undulated or obscurely nodulous, but in the last four or five whorls not so. From it the posterior part of the whorl ascends to the suture almost in a straight line or section of a cone, the anterior slope is full and rounded. The anal fasciole is polished and marked only by the fine silky incremental striae. The other transverse sculpture consists solely of fine incremental lines. The spiral sculpture, beside the keel, consists of fine, rather angular threads (about seven in a space of 3.0 mm) with a single finer thread generally present, on the body whorl, in the interspaces. These cover the whole shell, which appears when quite perfect to have a thin dark olive-colored epidermis, of which only traces remain on the type. The aperture is very large, the notch being one quarter of a volution in extent, very wide, and gently rounded into the outer lip, which is correspondingly curved forward. The siphonal canal is short, wide, hardly differentiated from the aperture. The columella is nearly straight, a broad (in the type specimen) rather thick marginated callus extending from in front of the notch around on the body, well around behind the columella, and so on to the siphonal canal. In the type the edge of the callus is somewhat thickened and raised, but this seems to be due to senile degeneration.

== Distribution ==
G. edgariana can be found in Caribbean waters, ranging from the coast of Louisiana to the Lesser Antilles.
