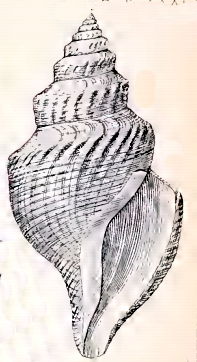
- Shells of Gymnobela bairdii

Scientific classification
- Kingdom: Animalia
- Phylum: Mollusca
- Class: Gastropoda
- Subclass: Caenogastropoda
- Order: Neogastropoda
- Family: Raphitomidae
- Genus: Gymnobela
- Species: G. bairdii

Binomial name
- Gymnobela bairdii (Verrill & Smith, 1884)

Synonyms
- Pleurotomella bairdi [sic] (misspelling); Pleurotomella bairdii Verrill & S. Smith [in Verrill], 1884

= Gymnobela bairdii =

Species of gastropod

Gymnobela bairdii, common name Baird's turrid, is a species of sea snail, a marine gastropod mollusk in the family Raphitomidae.

== Description ==
The length of the shell varies between 10 mm and 55 mm.

(Original description) The large, rather stout shell has a fusiform shape. It shows an elevated, acute, turreted spire and eight or nine obtusely shouldered, angular whorls. The body whorl is large and somewhat inflated, with a broad, flattened or a slightly concave, sloping subsutural band, which is covered with distinct, strongly receding lines of growth and with more or less evident, raised, spiral cinguli and grooves. Below the subsutural band the whorls are obtusely angulated, but without a distinct carina. Commencing at the shoulder and extending a short distance below it are numerous oblique, not very elevated, longitudinal ribs, which fade out before reaching the middle of the whorls. The whole surface of the whorls, including the ribs, is covered with conspicuous, raised, spiral cinguli, between which there are two or three smaller ones, separated by deep concave grooves of about the same breadth. The whole surface is covered by distinct, raised lines of growth. The aperture is oblong-ovate and is rather large. The columella is nearly straight, somewhat prolonged, its inner edge forming a slight sigmoid curve. The siphonal canal is short, broad, narrowed at the tip and not recurved. The outer lip is sharp and thin. The posterior sinus is broad and rather deep, with regularly rounded margins, corresponding to the lines on the subsutural band. Below the shoulder the lip projects considerably forward and then is somewhat flattened and recedes gradually to the base of the short and broad siphonal canal. The whorls of the protoconch are very small and generally eroded so far as to appear smooth. The shell is white or grayish white, without any distinct epidermis. The aperture is clear white. The animal is destitute of operculum and eyes.

== Distribution ==
Gymnobela bairdii can be found off the North American coast, ranging from New Jersey south to Florida, between depths of 1061 m and 4062 m.
