= Gymnobela cyrillei =

Scientific classification
- Kingdom: Animalia
- Phylum: Mollusca
- Class: Gastropoda
- Subclass: Caenogastropoda
- Order: Neogastropoda
- Superfamily: Conoidea
- Family: Raphitomidae
- Genus: Gymnobela
- Species: G. cyrillei

Binomial name
- Gymnobela cyrillei Lozouet, 2017

Extinct species of gastropod

Gymnobela cyrillei is an extinct species of sea snail, a marine gastropod mollusk in the family Raphitomidae.

== Distribution ==
Fossils of this marine species were found in Upper Oligocene strata in Southwest France.
