= Gymnobela clara =

Scientific classification
- Kingdom: Animalia
- Phylum: Mollusca
- Class: Gastropoda
- Subclass: Caenogastropoda
- Order: Neogastropoda
- Superfamily: Conoidea
- Family: Raphitomidae
- Genus: Gymnobela
- Species: G. clara

Binomial name
- Gymnobela clara Thiele, 1925

Synonyms
- Gymnobela (Gymnobela) clara Thiele, 1925

Species of gastropod

Gymnobela clara is a species of sea snail, a marine gastropod mollusk in the family Raphitomidae.

== Distribution ==
This marine species occurs off East Africa, but has only been accounted for once in human history, in 1981.
