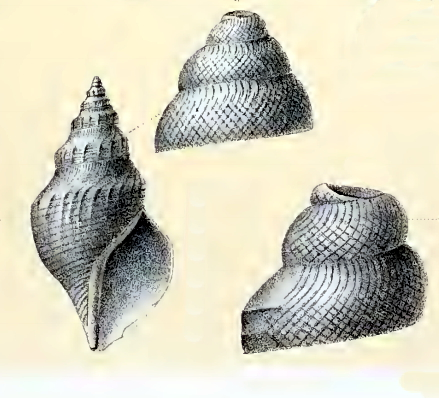
- Original image of a shell of Gymnobela homoeotata

Scientific classification
- Kingdom: Animalia
- Phylum: Mollusca
- Class: Gastropoda
- Subclass: Caenogastropoda
- Order: Neogastropoda
- Superfamily: Conoidea
- Family: Raphitomidae
- Genus: Gymnobela
- Species: G. homoeotata

Binomial name
- Gymnobela homoeotata (Watson, 1886)

Synonyms
- Clathurella homoeotata Watson, 1886 (original combination); Gymnobela homeotata (Watson, 1886)

= Gymnobela homoeotata =

Species of gastropod

Gymnobela homoeotata is a species of sea snail, a marine gastropod mollusk in the family Raphitomidae.

Not much is known about this species as it is relatively uncommon. There has been a total of five documented occurrences of this species being spotted.

== Description ==
(Original description) The shell is thin, delicate, pale chestnut, angulated, feebly plicate, spiralled, subscalar. It has a high conical, chestnut-tipped spire, a distinct suture, a tumid body whorl, a short rounded base, and a broad, triangular, lop-sided snout. The longitudinal sculpture on the whole surface is scored with fine unequal hair-like lines of growth, of which on the shoulder at about equal distances one is plicated. On the upper whorls these folds form short, very oblique, feeble riblets (there are about 25 on the penultimate whorl), while on the body whorl these are very obsolete but more numerous. In the sinus-area there are very faint traces of dense spiral texture. Just above the shoulder two or three small close-set furrows appear, and from the shoulder down to the point of the shell the surface is scored with shallow, crimped, rounded little furrows, which are much narrower than the flat intervals which part them but become stronger and closer toward the point of the shell. Below the middle of the whorls there is an obtuse angled keel forming the edge of the shoulder. The colour of the shell is, spire under a pale, membranaceous, glossy, chestnut epidermis. The spire is high, conical, subscalar. The apex is conically turbinate and consists of 4¼ small, convex, chestnut-coloured whorls, of which the last has a deeply sinuated lip-edge. They are scored with fine raised threads, which on the upper part of the whorls are curved and below are reticulated. There are 5½ whorls besides the embryonic apex. Above they have a sloping, slightly concave shoulder. About the middle or a little below it they are carinated, below the keel they are cylindrical. The body whorl is somewhat tumid with a rounded convex base, which contracts gradually to a blunt triangular snout, which is not in the least emarginate at the point. The suture is slightly oblique, very fine, but made distinct by the angulation at which the whorls join. The aperture is oval, strongly pointed above and below, where there is no proper siphonal canal at all. The outer lip has a very deep, broad, open sinus which lies quite up to the suture. From the sinus the thin lip-edge takes a prodigious sweep forward and then in front sweejis back to the point of the columella. The inner lip is shallowly excavated, glazed, short across the body, concave at the base of the columella, which is narrow, quite straight, and only cut off and twisted at the extreme point.

== Distribution ==
This marine species occurs in the Mid-Atlantic.
