= Gymnobela lamyi =

Scientific classification
- Kingdom: Animalia
- Phylum: Mollusca
- Class: Gastropoda
- Subclass: Caenogastropoda
- Order: Neogastropoda
- Superfamily: Conoidea
- Family: Raphitomidae
- Genus: Gymnobela
- Species: G. lamyi

Binomial name
- Gymnobela lamyi (Dautzenberg, 1925)

Synonyms
- Pleurotoma (Pleurotomella) lamyi Dautzenberg, 1925

Species of gastropod

Gymnobela lamyi is a species of sea snail, a marine gastropod mollusk in the family Raphitomidae.

The classification of this species in the genus Gymnobela is under consideration because the shell characters show a considerable divergence from those of the other species in the genus. Furthermore, no soft part are known.

== Distribution ==
This marine species occurs off the Azores at a depth of 1250 m.
