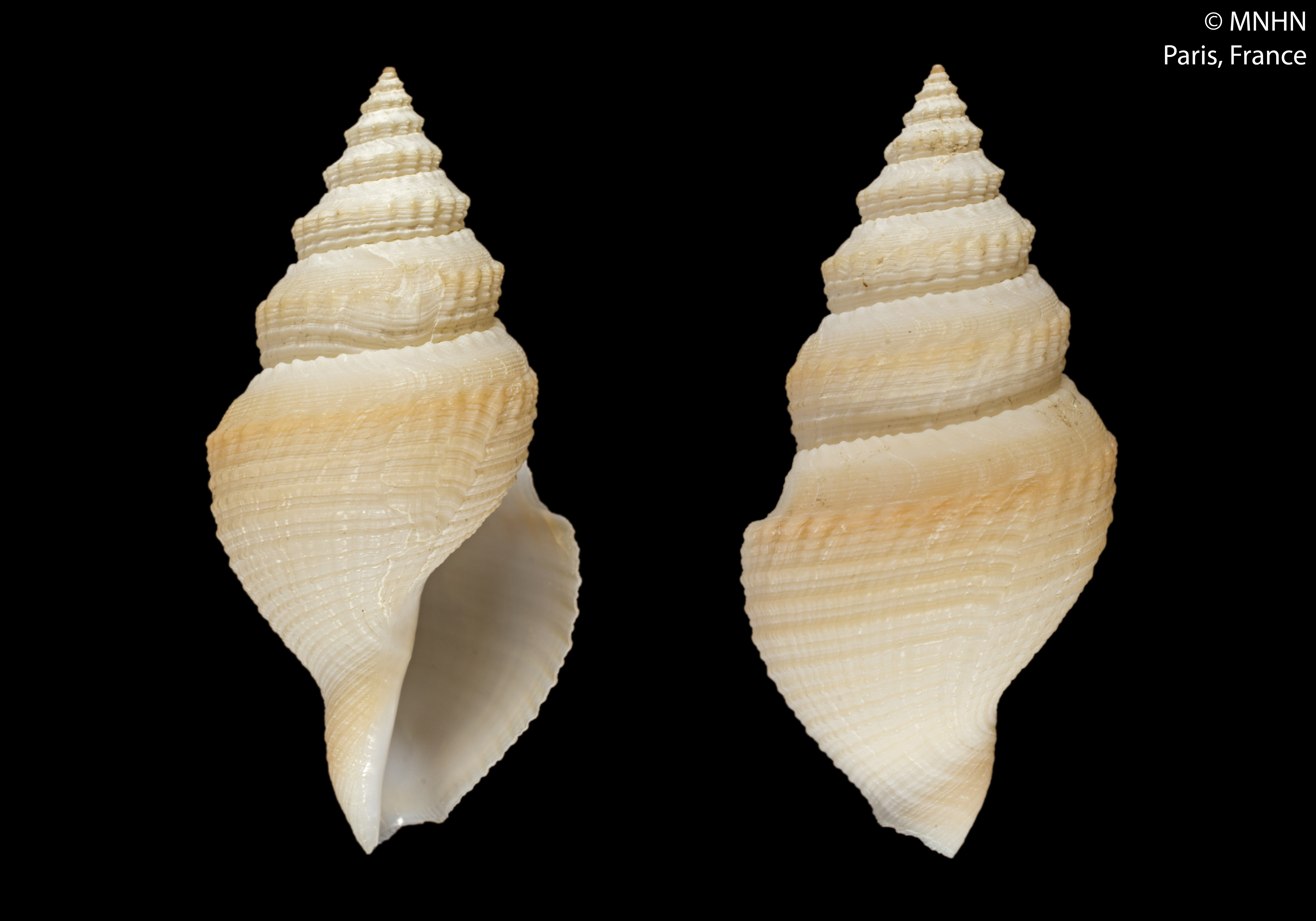

Scientific classification
- Kingdom: Animalia
- Phylum: Mollusca
- Class: Gastropoda
- Subclass: Caenogastropoda
- Order: Neogastropoda
- Superfamily: Conoidea
- Family: Raphitomidae
- Genus: Gymnobela
- Species: G. mitrodeta

Binomial name
- Gymnobela mitrodeta Sysoev, 1997

= Gymnobela mitrodeta =

Species of gastropod

Gymnobela mitrodeta is a species of sea snail, a marine gastropod mollusk in the family Raphitomidae.

== Description ==
The length of the shell attains 24.2 mm, its diameter 11.2 mm.

== Distribution ==
This marine species occurs in the Banda Sea, at depths between 413 m - 436 m.
