= Gymnobela chyta =

Scientific classification
- Kingdom: Animalia
- Phylum: Mollusca
- Class: Gastropoda
- Subclass: Caenogastropoda
- Order: Neogastropoda
- Superfamily: Conoidea
- Family: Raphitomidae
- Genus: Gymnobela
- Species: G. chyta

Binomial name
- Gymnobela chyta (R. B. Watson, 1881)

Synonyms
- Daphnella peripla (Dall, 1881); Pleurotoma (Defrancia) chyta Watson, 1881; Pleurotoma peripla Dall, 1881

Species of gastropod

Gymnobela chyta is a species of sea snail, a marine gastropod mollusk in the family Raphitomidae.

== Description ==
The length of the shell attains 14 mm.

(Original description) The white, conical, ribbed shell has a high, subscalar, small-pointed apex, a short tumid body whorl, a rounded contracted base, and a small aperture. The longitudinal sculpture consists on the body whorl of 14 ridge-shaped, round-topped, curved, oblique ribs. They are not strong and originate in small rounded beads at an angulation below the sinus-area, and die out on the base. They are parted by shallow rounded furrows of double their breadth. On the first regular whorl they appear as simple beads 9 in number. On the next whorl they assume the form of straight riblets, whose obliquity increases on each successive whorl. The lines of growth, which are quite independent of the riblets, are very slight. The spiral sculpture consists of a row of quite separate, very small, elongated tubercles below the suture. The sinus-area is bordered on its lower side by a very faint and small furrow. The angulation of the whorl below this is chiefly due to the row of beads in which the ribs originate, and here there are several very minute threads : 9 somewhat stronger, equal, and equally parted threads occupy the body from this angle downwards; about 5 others, stronger and wider apart, occupy the base, and about 4 more the aperture. Here and there a much finer thread occurs in the intervals. The spire is high, subscalar and conical. The apex is small, high, conical, with tumid whorls. The sculpture is typical, i. e. with straight bars above and obliquely reticulated ones below. The two or three of the very tip are broken. Whorls 6-7, exclusive o£ those which form the apex, of regular increase, with a drooping concave shoulder, keeled, and below the keel almost cylindrical, but with a very slight contraction to the lower suture. The body whorl is short, tumid, with a rounded base produced into a short, broad, triangular, one-sided aperture. The suture is very slightly impressed and extremely small, as the inferior whorl laps up on the one above it. The aperture is angularly oval, pointed above, broad in the middle, and obliquely prolonged below into the short siphonal canal. The outer lip is concave in the sinus-area and angulated at the keel. It forms from this point a very regular curve to the front. The edge, which sweeps far out below, forms rather a low shoulder above, between which and the body lies the deep, rather narrow, open-mouthed, rounded sinus. The inner lip is excavated, has a slight raised border outside of it, is rather broad, and continues to the extreme point of the short narrowish columella, which is rather obliquely cut off with a rounded twisted edge, and whose junction with the body is deeply concave.

== Distribution ==
D. peripla can be found in Caribbean waters, ranging from the western coast of Florida to the Yucatan.; also off the Azores
