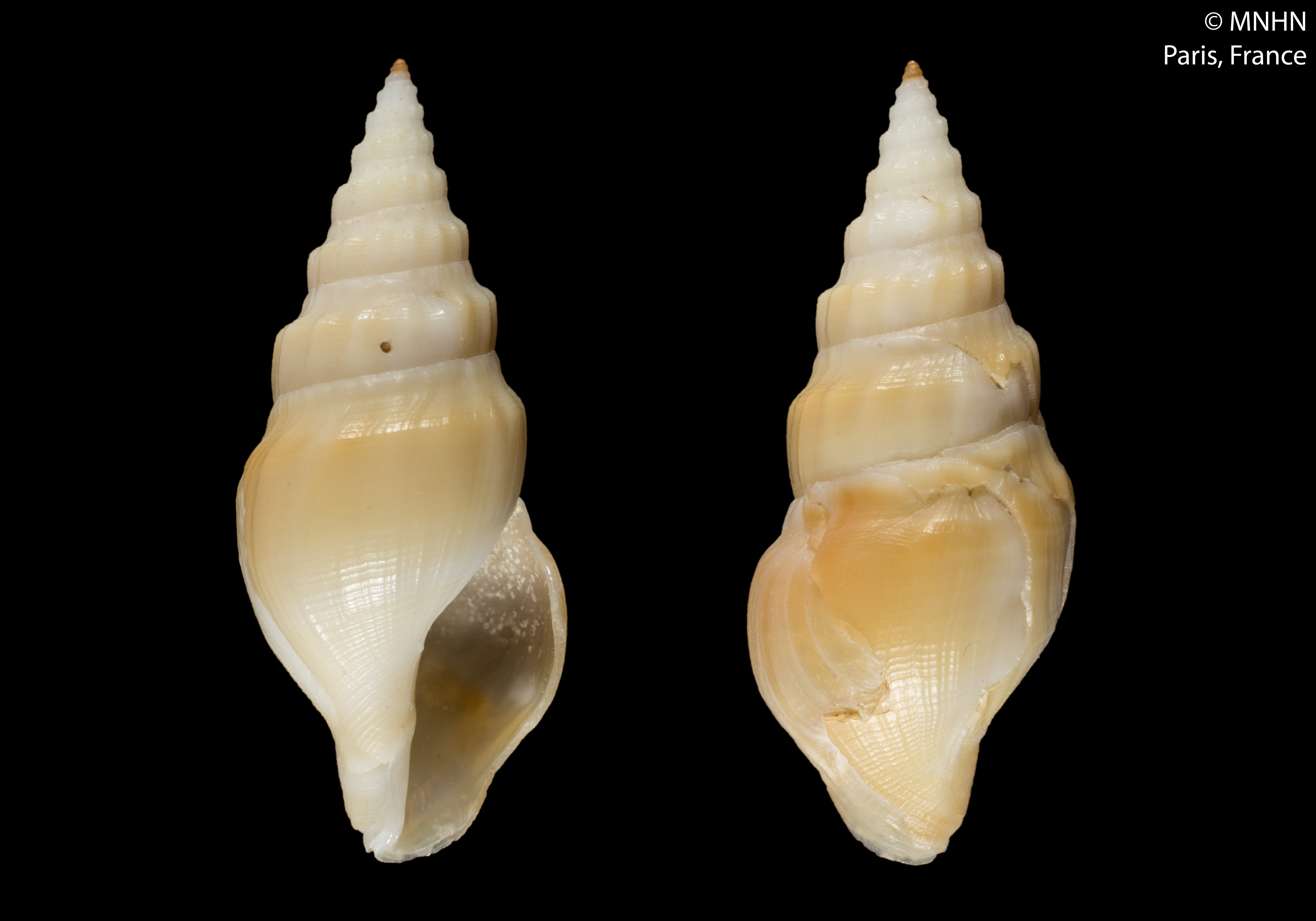
- Gymnobela eridmata

Scientific classification
- Kingdom: Animalia
- Phylum: Mollusca
- Class: Gastropoda
- Subclass: Caenogastropoda
- Order: Neogastropoda
- Superfamily: Conoidea
- Family: Raphitomidae
- Genus: Gymnobela
- Species: G. eridmata

Binomial name
- Gymnobela eridmata Sysoev & Bouchet, 2001

= Gymnobela eridmata =

Species of gastropod

Gymnobela eridmata is a species of sea snail, a marine gastropod mollusk in the family Raphitomidae.

== Description ==
The length of the shell attains 25.3 mm.

== Distribution ==
This marine species occurs in the Norfolk Ridge, New Caledonia.
