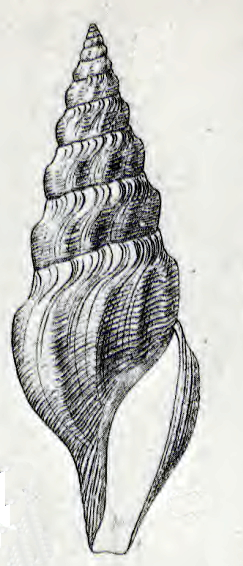
- Original image of Gymnobela atypha

Scientific classification
- Kingdom: Animalia
- Phylum: Mollusca
- Class: Gastropoda
- Subclass: Caenogastropoda
- Order: Neogastropoda
- Superfamily: Conoidea
- Family: Raphitomidae
- Genus: Gymnobela
- Species: G. atypha

Binomial name
- Gymnobela atypha (Bush, 1893)

Synonyms
- Pleurotomella atypha Bush, 1893 (original combination)

= Gymnobela atypha =

Species of gastropod

Gymnobela atypha is a species of sea snail, a marine gastropod mollusk in the family Raphitomidae.

== Description ==
The length of the shell attains 36 mm, its diameter 12 mm.

(Original description) The rather large shell is solid, somewhat translucent, bluish white, with a comparatively smooth surface and little lustre. The spire is unusually high, consisting of nine angularly shouldered whorls below the small, very acute, chestnut-brown protoconch. The aperture is short and broad. The posterior sinus is as broad as the subsutural band and rather shallow. The outer lip is considerably inflated, curving gradually toward the columella without forming a decided siphonal canal. The columella is nearly straight, curved slightly anteriorly, with a narrow, closely adhering strip of enamel. The suture is distinct, undulating and slightly channelled. The subsutural band is rather broad, oblique, somewhat concave, ornamented on the upper whorls with hue, distinct, curved riblets and lines of growth, the latter alone being visible on the two lower whorls. Just above the periphery, at the edge of the subsutural band, very narrow, sharp, slightly raised, oblique ribs, separated by very wide, slightly concave spaces, cross the whorls to the suture, and on the body whorl disappear just below the sutural line of the aperture. These ribs are most conspicuous at the shoulder, and vary considerably in different specimens, changing from the above narrow, sharp ones, with wide interspaces, to others broad and rounded, With narrower interspaces, the number on the body whorl vary from twelve to fifteen. The entire surface, except the protoconch and the subsutural band, is cut by fine, shallow grooves separated by flattened spaces of unequal width. These are deeper and coarser, or broader, on the lower part of the body whorl and siphonal canal, causing the spaces between them to appear as raised rounded threads. The protoconch is long, very slender, consisting of four and a half finely reticulated light chestnut-brown whorls. The apical whorl is imperfect, but must have been very minute, judging from the size of the succeeding one.

== Distribution ==
This marine species was found off the Carolinas, USA.
