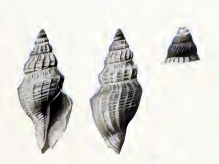
- Original image of a shell of Gymnobela ceramensis

Scientific classification
- Kingdom: Animalia
- Phylum: Mollusca
- Class: Gastropoda
- Subclass: Caenogastropoda
- Order: Neogastropoda
- Superfamily: Conoidea
- Family: Raphitomidae
- Genus: Gymnobela
- Species: G. ceramensis

Binomial name
- Gymnobela ceramensis (Schepman, 1913)

Synonyms
- Pleurotomella ceramensis Schepman, 1913

= Gymnobela ceramensis =

Species of gastropod

Gymnobela ceramensis is a species of sea snail, a marine gastropod mollusk in the family Raphitomidae.

== Description ==
The length of the shell attains 6.5 mm, its diameter 3 mm.

(Original description) The shortly fusiform shell is transparently white. It contains eight whorls, of which four form a yellowish-brown protoconch, with convex whorls, the uppermost broken, the other ones with curved riblets, crossed by oblique, slightly finer ones, over a large part of their breadth. The subsequent whorls are rather convex, angular, with a broad, excavated, upper part, a rather narrow, nearly straight, lower part. This lower part shows narrow, obtuse, axial ribs, occupying also the lower part of excavation, about 17 in number on the body whorl, where they are fainter near the aperture. These ribs are crossed by two strong spirals on the upper two whorls, three on the penultimate and numerous ones on the body whorl. The upper spiral forms a keel, which is tuberculiferous by the intercrossing of the ribs. Moreover there are fainter spirals in some of the interstices and just above the keel, in the basal part of the excavation, three in number in the penultimate whorl. The excavation is crossed by curved riblets or plicae in its upper part, and the whole shell is covered with fine growth-striae. The body whorl is regularly attenuated below, with a rather short siphonal canal. The aperture is angular above and at the end of keel, with a probably shallow sinus, below the suture;. The peristome is broken. The columellar margin shows a thin layer of enamel. The siphonal canal is a little broken, probably gutter-like.

== Distribution ==
This marine species occurs in the Ceram Sea, Indonesia.
