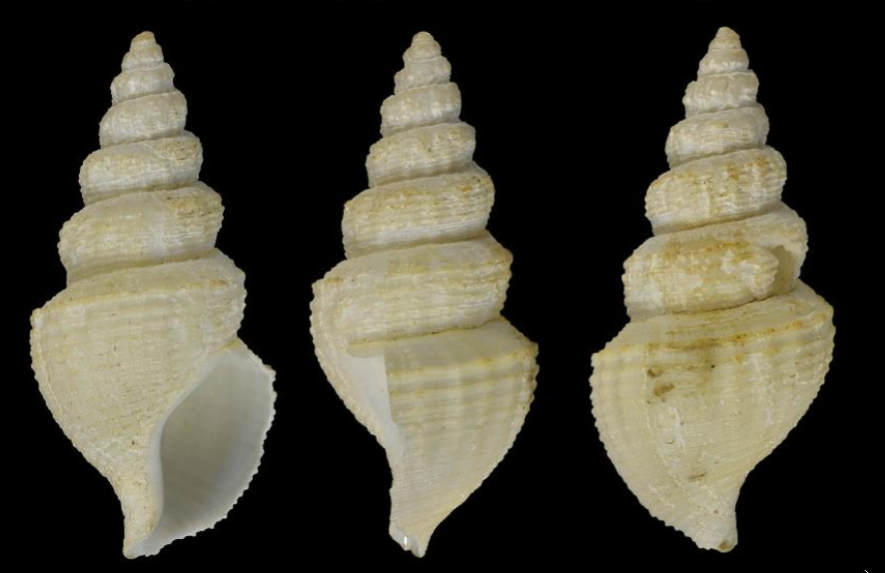
- Shell of Gymnobela xylona (holotype at the Smithsonian Institution)

Scientific classification
- Kingdom: Animalia
- Phylum: Mollusca
- Class: Gastropoda
- Subclass: Caenogastropoda
- Order: Neogastropoda
- Superfamily: Conoidea
- Family: Raphitomidae
- Genus: Gymnobela
- Species: G. xylona

Binomial name
- Gymnobela xylona (Dall, 1908)

Synonyms
- Pleurotomella (Gymnobela) xylona Dall, 1908

= Gymnobela xylona =

Species of gastropod

Gymnobela xylona is a species of sea snail, a marine gastropod mollusk in the family Raphitomidae.

== Description ==
The length of the shell attains 27 mm, its diameter 12 mm.

(Original description) The thin, white shell is elongate and subturrited. It contains eight whorls beside the (lost) protoconch. The deep suture is distinct and not channelle. The whorl in front of it slopes flatly to an angular shoulder and is sculptured with three or four flattish spiral threads with slightly wider interspaces separated from the keel at the shoulder by a channel three times as wide as the others. The shoulder keel is duplex, the posterior cord most prominent, the anterior, closely adjacent, less so. In front of these, extending to the siphonal canal, is a series (five on the penultimate whorl, eighteen on the body whorl) of similar but less prominent, subequal, and subequidistant cords, with numerous smaller intercalary threads, the interspaces wider than the primary cords. From the shoulder to the periphery on the body whorl are (on the type species about fourteen) numerous obscure narrow vertical riblets extending to but not over the base, but not nodulating the superincumbent cords. There are also numerous very fine, slightly prominent growth lines which tend to roughen the spiral sculpture. The aperture is short and wide. The outer lip (defective) is thin and simple. The body, with the sculpture erased, is polished, milky white. The columella is very short, gyrate, almost pervious. The siphonal canal is very short and wide.

== Distribution ==
This marine species was found off the Galapagos Islands at a depth of 2,487 m.
