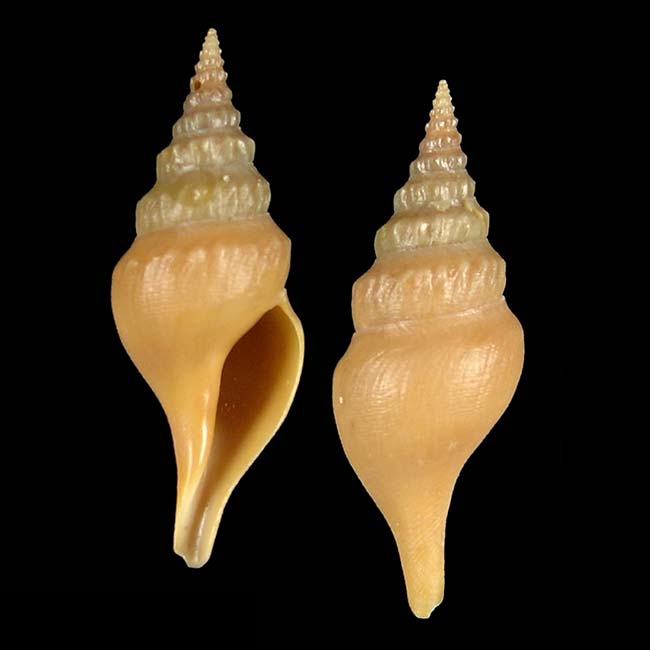
- Shell of Shell Gymnobela bululi

Scientific classification
- Kingdom: Animalia
- Phylum: Mollusca
- Class: Gastropoda
- Subclass: Caenogastropoda
- Order: Neogastropoda
- Superfamily: Conoidea
- Family: Raphitomidae
- Genus: Gymnobela
- Species: G. bululi

Binomial name
- Gymnobela bululi Stahlschmidt, Poppe & Tagaro, 2018

= Gymnobela bululi =

Species of gastropod

Gymnobela bululi is a species of sea snail, a marine gastropod mollusc in the family Raphitomidae.

== Description ==
The length of the shell varies between 39 mm and 47 mm.

== Distribution ==
This marine species occurs off Balut Island, S Mindanao, the Philippines.
