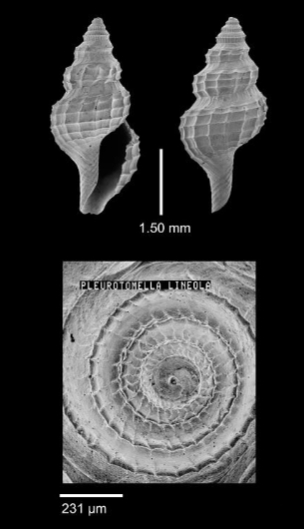
- Shell and protoconch of Gymnobela lineola (syntype at the Smithsonian Institution)

Scientific classification
- Kingdom: Animalia
- Phylum: Mollusca
- Class: Gastropoda
- Subclass: Caenogastropoda
- Order: Neogastropoda
- Superfamily: Conoidea
- Family: Raphitomidae
- Genus: Gymnobela
- Species: G. lineola

Binomial name
- Gymnobela lineola (W. H. Dall, 1927)

Synonyms
- Pleurotomella lineola Dall, 1927

= Gymnobela lineola =

Species of gastropod

Gymnobela lineola is a species of sea snail, a marine gastropod mollusk in the family Raphitomidae.

== Description ==
The length of the shell attains 5.5 mm, its diameter 2.25 mm.

(Original description) The small, thin, white shell has a sinusigera protoconch of 2½ brown whorls, followed by 3½ subsequent well rounded whorls. The suture is closely appressed, somewhat constricted;. The anal sulcus is deep and wide. The fasciole is close to the suture, crossed by retractively arcuate wrinkles. The axial sculpture consists of about 16 very narrow sharp ribs, with much wider interspaces, completely crossing the whorls except the anal fasciole. The spiral sculpture consists of (on the body whorl 6) slender threads with much wider interspaces, so that the interstices of the reticulation are nearly square. The siphonal canal is finely spirally threaded. The columella is short, straight, attenuate in front, gyrate, with pervious axis. The aperture is narrow. The outer lip is thin and arcuately produced in front.

== Distribution ==
This species occurs in the Atlantic Ocean off Cumberland Island, Georgia at a depth of 538 m.
