= Gymnobela latistriata =

Scientific classification
- Kingdom: Animalia
- Phylum: Mollusca
- Class: Gastropoda
- Subclass: Caenogastropoda
- Order: Neogastropoda
- Superfamily: Conoidea
- Family: Raphitomidae
- Genus: Gymnobela
- Species: G. latistriata

Binomial name
- Gymnobela latistriata Kantor & Sysoev, 1986

Synonyms
- Gymnobela (Gymnobela) latistriata Kantor & Sysoev, 1986

Species of gastropod

Gymnobela latistriata is a species of sea snail, a marine gastropod mollusk in the family Raphitomidae.

== Distribution ==
This marine species was found in the Japan Trench.
