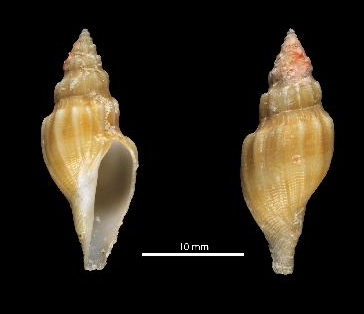
- Shell of Gymnobela midpacifica (paratype at MNHN, Paris)

Scientific classification
- Kingdom: Animalia
- Phylum: Mollusca
- Class: Gastropoda
- Subclass: Caenogastropoda
- Order: Neogastropoda
- Superfamily: Conoidea
- Family: Raphitomidae
- Genus: Gymnobela
- Species: G. midpacifica

Binomial name
- Gymnobela midpacifica Stahlschmidt & Chino, 2012

= Gymnobela midpacifica =

Species of gastropod

Gymnobela midpacifica is a species of sea snail, a marine gastropod mollusk in the family Raphitomidae.

== Description ==
The length of the shell attains 25.3 mm.

== Distribution ==
This marine species occurs in the Mid-Pacific, north of Midway Islands.
