= Gymnobela adenica =

Scientific classification
- Kingdom: Animalia
- Phylum: Mollusca
- Class: Gastropoda
- Subclass: Caenogastropoda
- Order: Neogastropoda
- Superfamily: Conoidea
- Family: Raphitomidae
- Genus: Gymnobela
- Species: G. adenica

Binomial name
- Gymnobela adenica Sysoev, 1996

Species of gastropod

Gymnobela adenica is a species of sea snail, a marine gastropod mollusk in the family Raphitomidae.

== Description ==
The length of the shell attains 9.5 mm, its diameter 6 mm.

== Distribution ==
This marine species occurs in the Gulf of Aden.
