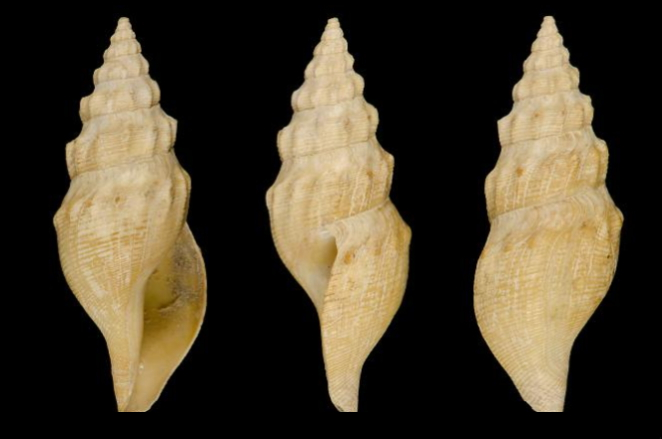
- Shell of Gymnobela filifera (holotype at the Smithsonian Institution)

Scientific classification
- Kingdom: Animalia
- Phylum: Mollusca
- Class: Gastropoda
- Subclass: Caenogastropoda
- Order: Neogastropoda
- Superfamily: Conoidea
- Family: Raphitomidae
- Genus: Gymnobela
- Species: G. filifera

Binomial name
- Gymnobela filifera (Dall, 1881)

Synonyms
- Cryoturris filifera (Dall, 1881); Pleurotoma (Bela) filifera Dall, 1881 (original combination); Pleurotomella filifera Dall, 1881

= Gymnobela filifera =

Species of gastropod

Gymnobela filifera is a species of sea snail, a marine gastropod mollusk in the family Raphitomidae.

== Description ==
The length of the shell attains 17.5 mm, its diameter 6.25 mm.

(Original description) The thin, delicate shell is elongated, fusiform, waxy white. The protoconch contains three whorls, generally decorticated. The shell contains ten whorls in all. These are near the suture smooth except for the distinct lines of growth indicating the deep wide notch. The suture is appressed and indistinct. Elsewhere the shell is sculptured with numerous nearly uniform flattened revolving threads with about equal interspaces. Otherwise it shows obliquely transverse elevations, hardly limited sharply enough to call ribs. These appear just below the sutural smooth band (sixteen on the body whorl), cross the whorls of the spire with a slight angulation above the middle of those whorls, but on the body whorl disappear at about the periphery . Tolerably evident lines of growth appear here and there, crossing the spiral sculpture. The spire is less than one third of the shell. The aperture measures a little less than half the length of the shell. The columella is straight, simple and polished.

== Distribution ==
G. filifera can be found in the Gulf of Mexico, ranging from the coast of Louisiana to western Florida.
