= Gymnobela camerunensis =

Scientific classification
- Kingdom: Animalia
- Phylum: Mollusca
- Class: Gastropoda
- Subclass: Caenogastropoda
- Order: Neogastropoda
- Superfamily: Conoidea
- Family: Raphitomidae
- Genus: Gymnobela
- Species: G. camerunensis

Binomial name
- Gymnobela camerunensis Thiele, 1925

Species of gastropod

Gymnobela camerunensis is a species of sea snail, a marine gastropod mollusk in the family Raphitomidae.

== Distribution ==
This marine species occurs in the Gulf of Guinea, West Africa.
