= Gymnobela brachypleura =

Scientific classification
- Kingdom: Animalia
- Phylum: Mollusca
- Class: Gastropoda
- Subclass: Caenogastropoda
- Order: Neogastropoda
- Superfamily: Conoidea
- Family: Raphitomidae
- Genus: Gymnobela
- Species: G. brachypleura

Binomial name
- Gymnobela brachypleura Sysoev, 1990

Species of gastropod

Gymnobela brachypleura is a species of sea snail, a marine gastropod mollusk in the family Raphitomidae.

== Distribution ==
This marine species was found in the Naska y Sala-i-Gomes Ridges, East Pacific
