= Gymnobela dagama =

Scientific classification
- Kingdom: Animalia
- Phylum: Mollusca
- Class: Gastropoda
- Subclass: Caenogastropoda
- Order: Neogastropoda
- Superfamily: Conoidea
- Family: Raphitomidae
- Genus: Gymnobela
- Species: G. dagama

Binomial name
- Gymnobela dagama (Barnard, 1963)

Synonyms
- Cythara dagama Barnard, 1963

Species of gastropod

Gymnobela dagama is a species of sea snail, a marine gastropod mollusk in the family Raphitomidae.

== Distribution ==
This marine species occurs off Cape Province, South Africa
