= Gymnobela ioessa =

Scientific classification
- Kingdom: Animalia
- Phylum: Mollusca
- Class: Gastropoda
- Subclass: Caenogastropoda
- Order: Neogastropoda
- Superfamily: Conoidea
- Family: Raphitomidae
- Genus: Gymnobela
- Species: G. ioessa

Binomial name
- Gymnobela ioessa Sysoev, 1997

Species of gastropod

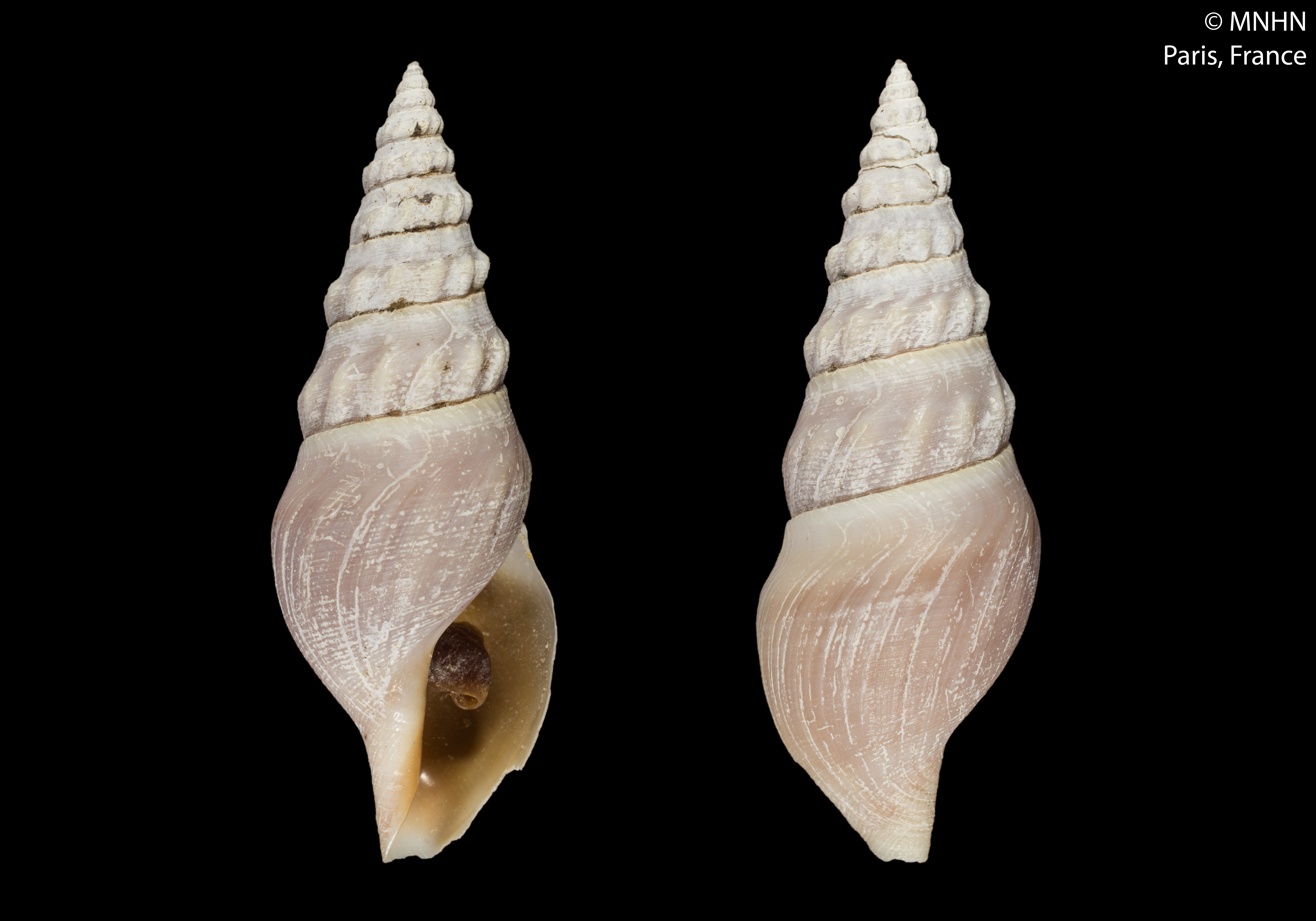
Gymnobela ioessa

Gymnobela ioessa is a species of sea snail, a marine gastropod mollusk in the family Raphitomidae.

== Etymology ==
The specific name is derived from ioessa, the feminine form of the Greek ioeis, meaning violet or dark brown, referring to the color of the shell.

== Description ==
The species' shell is 45 millimetres (1.8 in) tall and consists of 10 whorls, with a pronounced spire. The anal sinus is broad and deep. General coloration is reddish-violet, with brown coloration inside the aperture. The radular teeth are long and thin with barbs at the ends, measuring about 170 micrometres long. The aperture is 21.2 millimetres (0.83 in) tall by 16.0 millimetres (0.63 in) wide.

== Distribution ==
G. ioessa is found in the Tanimbar Islands of Indonesia. and in the Arafura Sea, at depths between 836 m - 869 m.
