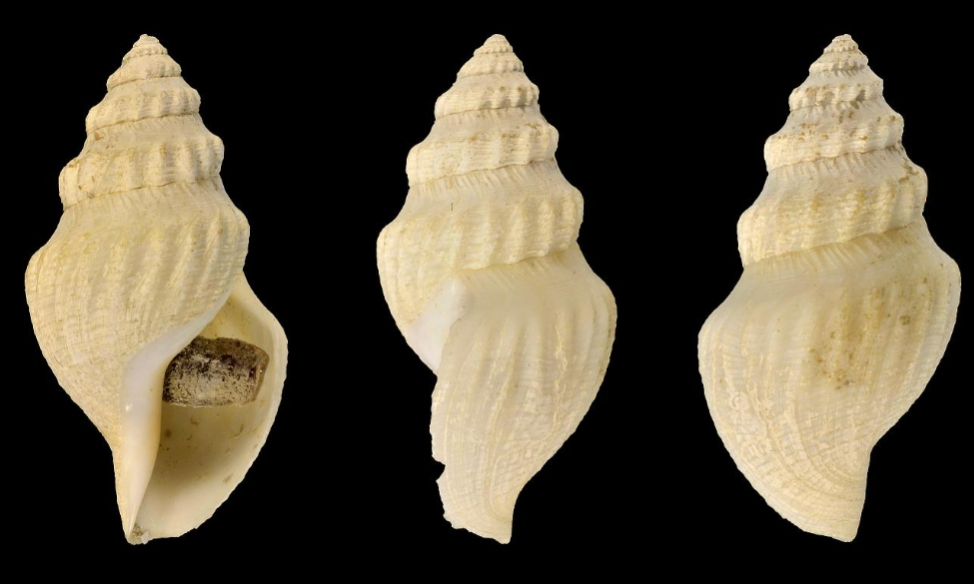
- Shell of Gymnobela agassizii (holotype at the Smithsonian Institution)

Scientific classification
- Kingdom: Animalia
- Phylum: Mollusca
- Class: Gastropoda
- Subclass: Caenogastropoda
- Order: Neogastropoda
- Superfamily: Conoidea
- Family: Raphitomidae
- Genus: Gymnobela
- Species: G. agassizii

Binomial name
- Gymnobela agassizii (Verrill & S. Smith [in Verrill], 1880)

Synonyms
- Gymnobela agassizi [sic] (misspelling); Gymnobela agassizii permagna Dall, 1890; Pleurotoma agassizi Verrill & S. Smith, 1880; Pleurotoma agassizii Verrill, 1880; Pleurotoma agassizii Verrill & S. Smith [in Verrill], 1880 (original combination); Pleurotoma brychia R. B. Watson, 1881 ( Pleurotomella agassizi Verrill & Smith, 1880; Pleurotomella agassizi permagna Dall, 1890; Pleurotomella brychia Watson, R.B., 1881; Pleurotomella vitrea Verrill, 1885

= Gymnobela agassizii =

Species of gastropod

Gymnobela agassizii is a species of sea snail, a marine gastropod mollusk in the family Raphitomidae.

Subspecies: Gymnobela agassizii mexicana (Dall, 1889) (synonym: Pleurotomella agassizii mexicana Dall, 1889)

== Description ==
The length of the shell attains 47 mm, its diameter 14 mm.

The shell is large and handsomely sculptured. It contains eight convex whorls, shouldered, with about sixteen thick, rounded, oblique ribs, separated by concave interspaces. The ribs do not extend above the shoulder, leaving a rather broad flattened band, which is covered by raised revolving lines, more or less decussated by prominent growth lines and slight riblets, running down the suture. The revolving lines become stronger and more elevated below the shoulder, and cross the ribs as well as their intervals. Towards the siphonal canal the ribs fade out and the revolving lines become still more prominent. The outer lip has a wide and rather deep rounded notch below the suture. Below this, it curves strongly forward and recedes again at the siphonal canal, which is rather short, narrowed and a little excurved. The columella is smooth, curved, and obliquely narrowed at the siphonal canal. The aperture is subovate, sinuous and rather large. The shell is white, except the columella which is stained with orange-brown.

== Distribution ==
G. agassizii can be found in Atlantic waters, ranging from the coast of Massachusetts south to Tobago.
