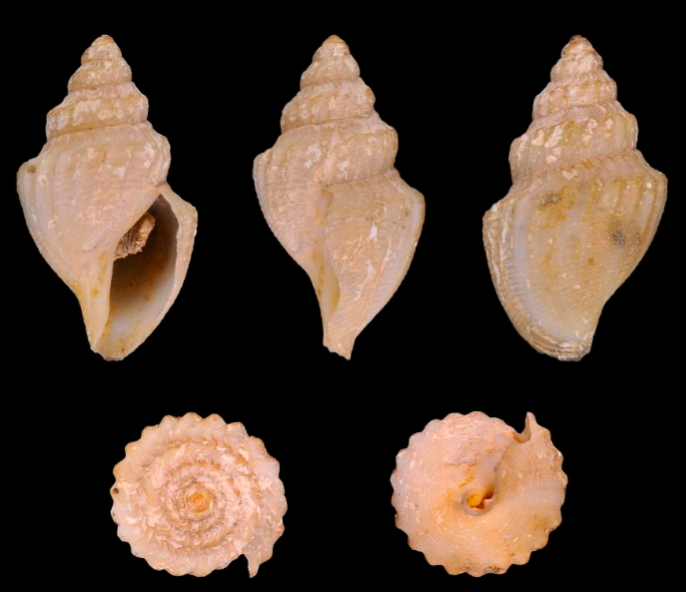
- Shell and protoconch of Gymnobela engonia (holotype at the Smithsonian Institution)

Scientific classification
- Kingdom: Animalia
- Phylum: Mollusca
- Class: Gastropoda
- Subclass: Caenogastropoda
- Order: Neogastropoda
- Superfamily: Conoidea
- Family: Raphitomidae
- Genus: Gymnobela
- Species: G. engonia

Binomial name
- Gymnobela engonia Verrill, 1884

Synonyms
- Pleurotomella aquilarum engonia Verrill, 1884

= Gymnobela engonia =

Species of gastropod

Gymnobela engonia is a species of sea snail, a marine gastropod mollusk in the family Raphitomidae.

== Description ==
The length of the shell attains 17 mm, its diameter 3.5 mm.

The somewhat solid, white, more or less translucent shell has a stout-fusiform shape. The aperture is about equal in length to the spire, which is shouldered, decidedly turreted, and tapered regularly to an acute apex. The shell contains five whorls below the protoconch, strongly angularly shouldered at about the middle, the portion above the shoulder forming a wide, abruptly sloping subsutural band, which is usually slightly concave in the middle, but swells a little where it joins the suture. The whorls are flattened below the shoulder and a little narrowed at the suture, which is strongly impressed. The sculpture on the subsutural band consists of many, close, revolving lines towards the shoulder, and of small, slightly raised, thin riblets, which are most distinct close to the suture and strongly excurved in the middle of the band, but bend forward to the angle of the shoulder, where most of them disappear or blend with the ribs and lines of growth a little further forward. Below the shoulder the surface is covered by many, rather thin, closely arranged, revolving cinguli, which on the whorls of the spire are separated by interspaces about twice their own width, but become much closer on the middle of the body whorl, gradually becoming coarser and more widely separated as they approach the siphonal canal, those on the anterior part being also thicker and more obtuse. Numerous rather small and slightly elevated ribs commence at the shoulder and curve obliquely forward across the convex part of the whorls, extending to the suture on the upper whorls, but mostly fading out at the middle of the body whorl. These ribs are obtusely rounded and wave-like, the interspaces being shallow, concave, in breadth about equal to the ribs. On the body whorl there are from twenty-five to thirty. On the spire-whorls the intersections of the cinguli and ribs, which are of about the same size, produce a pretty regularly cancellated structure, but on the body whorl the cinguli are more numerous and less prominent than the ribs. The protoconch is chestnut-brown and consists of about 2½ regularly increasing whorls, the apical one being very small and regularly coiled; this surface appears to have been minutely cancellated by microscopic lines. The aperture is irregularly oblong or oblong-ovate, strongly angulated by the shoulder, and decidedly widest at the base of the columella. The siphonal canal is short, somewhat constricted and nearly straight. The outer lip is thin, projecting forward below the shoulder, with a broad, rounded, rather shallow sinus at the middle of the subsutural band and a little removed from the suture. The operculum is not present in the alcoholic specimens.

== Distribution ==
This species occurs off New England, USA and was found off the Nantucket Shoals at a depth of 2941 m.
