= Gymnobela felderi =

Scientific classification
- Kingdom: Animalia
- Phylum: Mollusca
- Class: Gastropoda
- Subclass: Caenogastropoda
- Order: Neogastropoda
- Superfamily: Conoidea
- Family: Raphitomidae
- Genus: Gymnobela
- Species: G. felderi

Binomial name
- Gymnobela felderi Garcia, 2005

Species of gastropod

Gymnobela felderi is a species of sea snail, a marine gastropod mollusk in the family Raphitomidae.

== Description ==
The rather solid shell is in form and general appearance like Bela. The spire is generally rather short. The body whorl is swollen. The whorls are often shouldered. The sculpture is rather strong. The protoconch has a fine-cancellated sculpture. The subsutural band is not strongly marked. The posterior notch of the lip is shallow and usually not very distinct. The operculum is absent.

Fossils have been found in the Pliocene strata of Panama and the Quaternary strata of Costa Rica (age range: 3.6 to 0.781 Ma).

== Distribution ==
G. felderi can be found in the Gulf of Mexico, off the coast of Louisiana.
