= Mioawateria malmii =

Scientific classification
- Kingdom: Animalia
- Phylum: Mollusca
- Class: Gastropoda
- Subclass: Caenogastropoda
- Order: Neogastropoda
- Superfamily: Conoidea
- Family: Raphitomidae
- Genus: Mioawateria
- Species: M. malmii

Binomial name
- Mioawateria malmii (Dall, 1889)

Synonyms
- Gymnobela malmii (Dall, 1889); Gymnobela pycnoides Dautzenberg & Fischer, 1896; Magnella malmii (Dall, 1889); Mangilia malmii Dall, 1889 (original combination); Pleurotoma parvulum Locard, 1897; Pleurotoma pycnoides Dautzenberg & Fischer, 1896; Pleurotomella malmii Dall, 1889; Taranis malmii (Dall, 1889); Taranis moerchii Auct. non Malm, 1861; Taranis tornata malmii Dall, 1889

Species of gastropod

Mioawateria malmii is a species of sea snail, a marine gastropod mollusk in the family Raphitomidae.

== Description ==
The shell attains a length of 6 mm (0.24 in).

== Distribution ==
M. malmii can be found in the Gulf of Mexico, ranging from the coast of Louisiana to Cuba, also off Guadeloupe and in the Northern Atlantic Ocean (Azores, Bay of Biscay).
