= Theta lyronuclea =

Scientific classification
- Kingdom: Animalia
- Phylum: Mollusca
- Class: Gastropoda
- Subclass: Caenogastropoda
- Order: Neogastropoda
- Family: Raphitomidae
- Genus: Theta
- Species: T. lyronuclea

Binomial name
- Theta lyronuclea (A. H. Clarke, 1959)

Synonyms
- Gymnobela lyroniclea [sic] (misspelling); Gymnobela lyronuclea (A. H. Clarke, 1959); Gymnobela (Theta) lyronuclea (A. H. Clarke, 1959); Pleurotomella lyronuclea Clarke, 1959

Species of gastropod

Theta lyronuclea is a species of sea snail, a marine gastropod mollusk in the family Raphitomidae.

== Description ==
The length of the shell attains 9.3 mm.

== Distribution ==
This marine species occurs in the Atlantic Ocean off Madeira.
