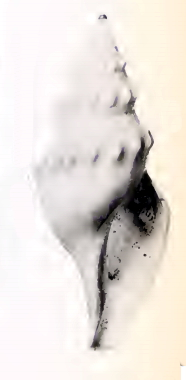
- Original image of a shell of Austrobela fulvotincta

Scientific classification
- Kingdom: Animalia
- Phylum: Mollusca
- Class: Gastropoda
- Subclass: Caenogastropoda
- Order: Neogastropoda
- Superfamily: Conoidea
- Family: Raphitomidae
- Genus: Austrobela
- Species: A. fulvotincta

Binomial name
- Austrobela fulvotincta (Dautzenberg & Fischer, 1896)

Synonyms
- Gymnobela fulvocincta Dautzenberg & Fischer, 1896; Pleurotoma fulvotincta Dautzenberg & Fischer, 1896 (original combination); Pleurotomella fulvotincta (Dautzenberg & Fischer, 1896)

= Austrobela fulvotincta =

Species of gastropod

Austrobela fulvotincta is a species of sea snail, a marine gastropod mollusk in the family Raphitomidae.

== Description ==
The length of the shell attains 33 mm, its diameter 13 mm.

The spire of the rather solid shell is composed of 9 whorls, separated by a well marked suture. The whorls of the protoconch consist of curved longitudinal ribs and are, at the bottom, finely reticulated. A little below the middle of the subsequent whorls, occur a series of longitudinal, tuberculous plicae. These tubercles are protruding, rounded, very regularly arranged and give the whorls a streamlined appearance. There are 15 plicae on the penultimate whorl, 20 on the body whorl These plicae do not extend to the suture. On the body whorl however, they continue downward in an obsolete manner. The infra-sutural zone, is wide, sloping, with very arched growth lines, a little more developed close to the suture. The whole surface, with the exception of the infra-sutural zone, is crossed by small, thin, and regular growth lines, a little less wide than their intervals. The aperture is elongated, angular at the apex, attenuated at the base where it is prolonged into a mediocre, well open and not reflected siphonal canal. The columella is very slightly twisted. The outer lip is simple, arched and is broadly, but not deeply indented at the top.

== Distribution ==
This marine species occurs off the Azores and the Cape Verdes.
