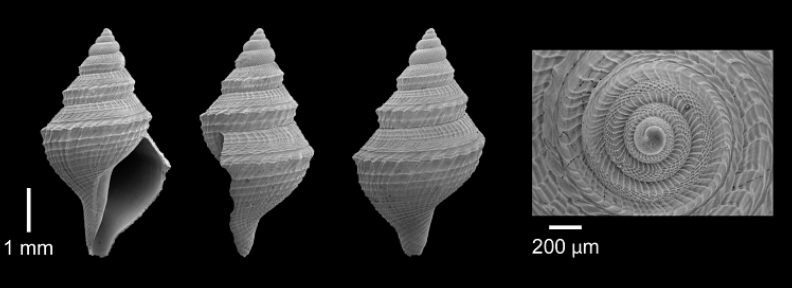
- Shell and protoconch of Daphnella grundifera (syntype at the Smithsonian Institution)

Scientific classification
- Kingdom: Animalia
- Phylum: Mollusca
- Class: Gastropoda
- Subclass: Caenogastropoda
- Order: Neogastropoda
- Superfamily: Conoidea
- Family: Raphitomidae
- Genus: Daphnella
- Species: D. grundifera

Binomial name
- Daphnella grundifera (W. H. Dall, 1927)

Synonyms
- Gymnobela grundifera Dall, 1927

= Daphnella grundifera =

Species of gastropod

Daphnella grundifera is a species of sea snail, a marine gastropod mollusk in the family Raphitomidae.

== Description ==
The length of the shell attains 5.2 mm, its diameter 3.3 mm.

(Original description) The small, biconic, white shell has a brown rounded sinusigera protoconch consisting of three whorls, followed by three subsequent whorls. The suture is appressed, minutely crenulated by the ends of the axial sculpture in front of it. The anal sulcus is wide and only moderately deep. The fasciole is wide, sculptured with retractively arcuate, sharp, elevated lines. The other axial sculpture consists of well-marked incremental lines, and faint narrow indications of obsolete ribbing. The spiral sculpture consists of a single strong peripheral keel, about eight slender low threads with wider interspaces in front of it, minutely crenulate by the axial sculpture, and much closer fine threading on the siphonal canal. The base is moderately rounded. The columella is straight and attenuated in front. The siphonal canal is short and wide. The outer lip is thin and arcuate.

== Distribution ==
This marine species occurs off Georgia, USA, and off Guadeloupe and Cuba
