= Theta vayssierei =

Scientific classification
- Kingdom: Animalia
- Phylum: Mollusca
- Class: Gastropoda
- Subclass: Caenogastropoda
- Order: Neogastropoda
- Family: Raphitomidae
- Genus: Theta
- Species: T. vayssierei

Binomial name
- Theta vayssierei (Dautzenberg, 1925)

Synonyms
- Gymnobela bathyiberica Fechter, 1976; Pleurotoma vayssierei Dautzenberg, 1925; Pleurotomella bathyiberica Fechter, 1976

Species of gastropod

Theta vayssierei is a species of sea snail, a marine gastropod mollusk in the family Raphitomidae. The taxonomy of this species was clarified by Dautzenberg in 1925, who assigned it to the genus Theta. It has been knowns by the synonyms Gymnobela bathyiberica and Pleurotomella bathyiberica.

== Description ==
The length of the shell attains 53 mm.

== Distribution ==
This species is found in the Mediterranean Sea.
