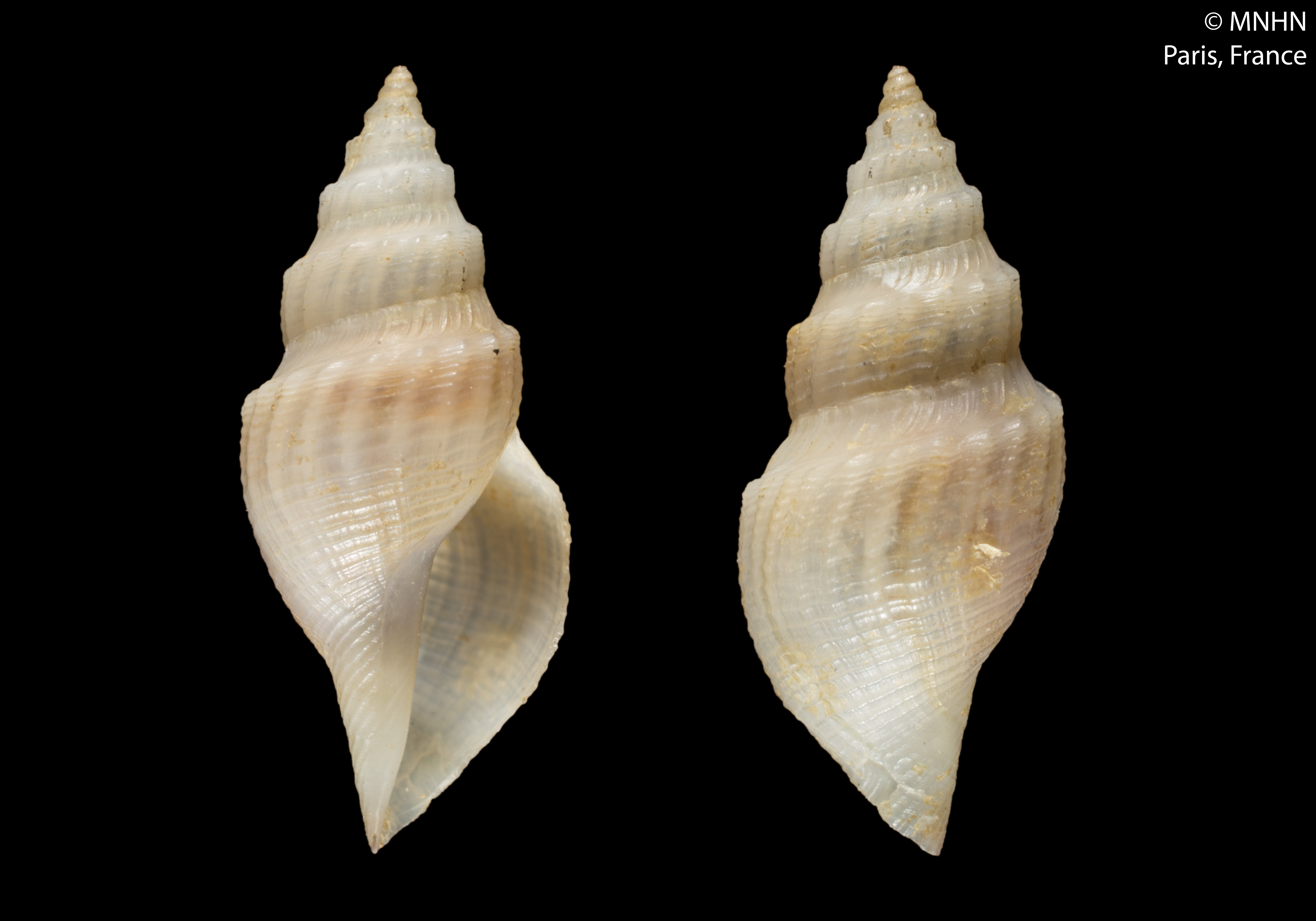

Scientific classification
- Kingdom: Animalia
- Phylum: Mollusca
- Class: Gastropoda
- Subclass: Caenogastropoda
- Order: Neogastropoda
- Superfamily: Conoidea
- Family: Raphitomidae
- Genus: Austrobela
- Species: A. pyrrhogramma

Binomial name
- Austrobela pyrrhogramma (Dautzenberg & Fischer, 1896)

Synonyms
- Bela holomera Locard, 1897; Bela recondita Locard, 1897; Gymnobela pyrrhogramma (Dautzenberg & H. Fischer, 1896); Gymnobela holomera Locard, 1897; Gymnobela recondita Tiberi, 1869; Oenopota holomera É.A.A. Locard, 1897; Pleurotoma pyrrhogramma Dautzenberg & Fischer, 1896; Pleurotoma pyrrhogramma var. multicostata Dautzenberg & Fischer H., 1896; Pleurotoma pyrrhogramma var. robusta Dautzenberg & Fischer H., 1896

= Austrobela pyrrhogramma =

Species of gastropod

Austrobela pyrrhogramma is a species of sea snail, a marine gastropod mollusk in the family Raphitomidae.

== Description ==
The length of the shell attains 17.2 mm, its diameter 5 mm.

(Original description in French) The shell is solid, with a high-spired form that tapers to a sharply acuminate apex. It is composed of ten whorls separated by a shallow yet clearly defined suture. The four embryonic whorls are convex: the first is faintly transversely striated, while the remaining three are finely reticulated. The post-embryonic whorls display, below the excavated infra-sutural zone — ornamented with arched growth folds — a distinct and well-defined keel. Beyond this keel, the whorls become slightly convex and are furnished with arched longitudinal folds directed opposite to those of the infra-sutural zone, as well as with numerous equal, regular, descending cords that pass over the folds. The aperture is elongate-oval, angular at the top and narrowed at the base, where it ends in a short, open siphonal canal. The columella is nearly perpendicular and bears a thin, closely appressed callus. The outer lip is simple, sharp-edged, and broadly and fairly deeply notched at the top. The coloration is white, adorned with narrow longitudinal flame-like markings of yellowish-brown, arranged along the lines of growth; these markings vary considerably in intensity. The embryonic whorls are light brown in color.

== Distribution ==
This species occurs in the Atlantic Ocean off the Azores and in the Bay of Biscay.
