= Bathytoma virgo =

Scientific classification
- Kingdom: Animalia
- Phylum: Mollusca
- Class: Gastropoda
- Subclass: Caenogastropoda
- Order: Neogastropoda
- Superfamily: Conoidea
- Family: Borsoniidae
- Genus: Bathytoma
- Species: B. virgo

Binomial name
- Bathytoma virgo (Okutani, 1966)

Synonyms
- Gymnobela virgo (Okutani, 1966); Pleurotomella virgo Okutani, 1966 (original combination)

Species of gastropod

Bathytoma virgo is a species of sea snail, a marine gastropod mollusk in the family Borsoniidae.

== Distribution ==
This marine species occurs off Japan.
