= Pleurotomella normalis =

Scientific classification
- Kingdom: Animalia
- Phylum: Mollusca
- Class: Gastropoda
- Subclass: Caenogastropoda
- Order: Neogastropoda
- Superfamily: Conoidea
- Family: Raphitomidae
- Genus: Pleurotomella
- Species: P. normalis

Binomial name
- Pleurotomella normalis (Dall, 1881)

Synonyms
- Gymnobela blakeana blakeana normalis (Dall, 1881); Pleurotoma normalis Dall, 1881; Pleurotomella (Bleka) blakeana Dall, 1881 (original description)

Species of gastropod

Pleurotomella normalis is a species of sea snail, a marine gastropod mollusk in the family Raphitomidae.

== Description ==
(Original description) The short and very stout shell contains seven whorls. The body whorl measures about eight elevenths of the whole length. The apex of the protoconch is smooth. The remainder consists of the 3½ yellow-brown nuclear whorls, beautifully reticulated with wavy transverse lines, then changing suddenly into waxy white. The subsequent whorls show spiral threads, set in pairs which frequently blend to make one flattened spiral thread, with wider interspaces between the threads. Two or three threads next the suture are stronger and wider apart than the others, the outer one strongest, giving the whorl a turreted appearance, and rising into little knobs on the transverse ridges. These ridges are rather sharp, sixteen to eighteen in number, fading away toward the siphonal canal in most but not all specimens, flexuous with the lines of growth. The columella is straight, the edge obliquely cut off, shorter than the aperture anteriorly. There is a light deposit of callus on the body. The aperture is proportionally wide, thin-lipped and about half as long as the shell.

== Distribution ==
This marine species occurs in the Yucatan Strait.
