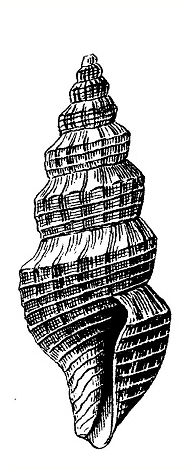
- Drawing of a shell of Pleurotomella circumvoluta

Scientific classification
- Kingdom: Animalia
- Phylum: Mollusca
- Class: Gastropoda
- Subclass: Caenogastropoda
- Order: Neogastropoda
- Superfamily: Conoidea
- Family: Raphitomidae
- Genus: Pleurotomella; Verrill, 1872

Type species
- Pleurotomella packardii Verrill, 1872

Species
- See text

Synonyms
- Anomalotomella Powell, 1966; Azorita F. Nordsieck, 1968; Fusidaphne Laseron, 1954; Mangilia (Pleurotomella) Verrill, 1872; Pleurotomella (Anomalotomella) Powell, 1966 · accepted, alternate representation; Pleurotoma (Pleurotomella); Pleurotomella (Pleurotomella) Verrill, 1872· accepted, alternate representation; † Pleurotomella (Systenope) Cossmann, 1889 · accepted, alternate representation; Tasmadaphne Laseron, 1954

= Pleurotomella =

Genus of gastropods

Pleurotomella is a genus of sea snails, marine gastropod mollusks in the family Raphitomidae.

== Description ==
(Original description by Verrill) As at present understood, this genus is intended to include those species which have a rather broad and very distinct subsutural band, crossed by excurved lines of growth corresponding to the form of the posterior sinus of the lip, which is situated a little below the suture and is always pretty well-developed, but is sometimes broad and shallow, and at other times narrower and very deep. The outer lip is always thin and sharp, without any appearance of a varix, nor is there any deposit of callus on the body whorl, in front of the aperture. The siphonal canal is well developed, generally constricted at the base and somewhat elongated, and usually but slightly curved. In a few of the species, doubtfully referred to hie genus, it is short and wide. The columella-margin is more or less sinuous. The protoconch differs in sculpture, and usually in color, from the rest of the whorls, and is generally minutely cancellated by fine raised lines running obliquely in opposite directions. The remaining whorls are elegantly sculptured by longitudinal ribs and revolving cinguli, and usually have a distinct shoulder or carina, which is frequently nodulous, below the subsutural band. The animal is destitute of an operculum, and, in all the species hitherto examined, is without eyes. The dentition consists of rather strong uncini, usually with a barbed tip and broad base.

(Description by Dall) The larval shell is multispiral. The adult shell shows a small blunt protoconch of several (usually) swollen whorls, closely arcuately axially ribbed. This protoconch is dark and sculptured with criss-cross lines, strongly contrasting with the rest of the shell. The succeeding short-fusiform whorls have an axial and (fainter) spiral sculpture. The anal sulcus is close to the suture, deep and wide, with a distinct fasciole. The siphonal canal is very short, narrow, recurved. The outer lip is thin, simple and sharp. The columella is thin, gyrate, anteriorly obliquely truncate, almost pervious. The animal is blind and lacks an operculum

== Species ==
Species within the genus Pleurotomella include:

- Pleurotomella aculeata (Webster, 1906)
- Pleurotomella aculeola (Hedley, 1915)
- Pleurotomella allisoni Rehder & Ladd, 1973
- Pleurotomella amphiblestrum (Melvill, 1904)
- Pleurotomella amplecta (Hedley, 1922)
- Pleurotomella anceyi (Dautzenberg & Fischer, 1897)
- Pleurotomella annulata Thiele, 1912
- Pleurotomella anomalapex Powell, 1951
- † Pleurotomella balcombensis (Powell, 1944)
- † Pleurotomella bateroensis Lozouet, 1999
- Pleurotomella bathybia Strebel, 1908
- Pleurotomella bathysinuata Criscione & Hallan, 2025
- † Pleurotomella bellistriata Clark, 1895
- Pleurotomella benedicti Verrill, 1884
- † Pleurotomella bezanconi Cossmann, 1902
- † Pleurotomella bezoyensis Lozouet, 2017
- Pleurotomella borbonica J.C. Melvill, 1923
- Pleurotomella brenchleyi (Angas, 1877)
- Pleurotomella buccinoides (Shuto, 1983)
- Pleurotomella bullata (Laseron, 1954)
- Pleurotomella bureaui (Dautzenberg & Fischer, 1897)
- Pleurotomella cala (R. B. Watson, 1886)
- Pleurotomella capricornea (Hedley, 1922)
- † Pleurotomella chapplei (Powell, 1944)
- Pleurotomella circumvoluta (Watson, 1881)
- Pleurotomella clathurellaeformis Schepman, 1913
- Pleurotomella coelorhaphe (Dautzenberg & Fischer H., 1896)
- Pleurotomella compacta (Hedley, 1922)
- † Pleurotomella contigua (Powell, 1944)
- Pleurotomella corrida Dall, 1927
- † Pleurotomella cuspidata (Chapple, 1934)
- Pleurotomella deliciosa Thiele, 1912
- Pleurotomella demosia (Dautzenberg & Fischer, 1896)
- † Pleurotomella dimeres (Cossmann, 1889)
- Pleurotomella dinora Dall, 1908
- Pleurotomella ecphora (Melvill, 1904)
- Pleurotomella elisa Thiele, 1925
- Pleurotomella elusiva (Dall, 1881)
- Pleurotomella endeavourensis Dell, 1990
- Pleurotomella enderbyensis Powell, 1958
- Pleurotomella enora (Dall, 1908)
- †Pleurotomella eomargaritata Lozouet, 2015
- † Pleurotomella esmeralda Olsson, 1964
- † Pleurotomella espisbosensis Lozouet, 2015
- Pleurotomella eulimenes (Melvill, 1904)
- Pleurotomella eurybrocha (Dautzenberg & Fischer, 1896)
- Pleurotomella evadne Melvill, 1912
- Pleurotomella expeditionis (Dell, 1956)
- Pleurotomella formosa (Jeffreys, 1867)
- † Pleurotomella fragilis (Deshayes, 1834)
- Pleurotomella frigida Thiele, 1912
- Pleurotomella gibbera Bouchet & Warén, 1980
- † Pleurotomella goniocolpa (Cossmann, 1889)
- † Pleurotomella granulatorappardi Janssen, 1979
- Pleurotomella granuliapicata Okutani, 1964
- † Pleurotomella grimmertingenensis Marquet, Lenaerts & Laporte, 2016
- † Pleurotomella guespellensis (Cossmann, 1889)
- Pleurotomella hadria (Dall, 1889)
- Pleurotomella hayesiana (Angas, 1871)
- Pleurotomella helena Thiele, 1925
- Pleurotomella herminea Dall, 1919
- Pleurotomella hermione (Dall, 1919)
- Pleurotomella hypermnestra Melvill, 1912
- Pleurotomella imitator (Dall, 1927)
- Pleurotomella innocentia (Dell, 1990)
- † Pleurotomella insignifica (Heilprin, 1879)
- † Pleurotomella intermedia Gougerot & Le Renard, 1982
- Pleurotomella ipara (Dall, 1881)
- † Pleurotomella irminonvilla Pacaud, 2021
- Pleurotomella itama (Melvill, 1906)
- Pleurotomella lottae Verrill, 1885:
- Pleurotomella lucasii (Melvill, J.C., 1904)
- Pleurotomella maitasi Engl, 2008
- Pleurotomella marshalli (Sykes, 1906)
- † Pleurotomella megapex Lozouet, 1999
- Pleurotomella minuta Sysoev & Ivanov, 1985
- † Pleurotomella neerrepenensis Marquet, Lenaerts & Laporte, 2016
- Pleurotomella nipri (Numanami, 1996)
- Pleurotomella normalis (Dall, 1881)
- Pleurotomella obesa Bouchet & Warén, 1980
- † Pleurotomella obesula Landau, Harzhauser & Giannuzzi-Savelli, 2022
- Pleurotomella ohlini (Strebel, 1905)
- Pleurotomella orariana (Dall, 1908)
- † Pleurotomella orthocolpa Cossmann, 1902
- Pleurotomella packardii Verrill, 1872
- Pleurotomella pandionis (A. E. Verrill, 1880)
- Pleurotomella papyracea (Watson, 1881)
- Pleurotomella parella Dall, 1908
- Pleurotomella perpauxilla (Watson, 1881)
- Pleurotomella petiti Kantor, Harasewych & Puillandre, 2016
- † Pleurotomella polycolpa (Cossmann, 1889)
- Pleurotomella porcellana (Watson, 1886)
- † Pleurotomella protocarinata Lozouet, 2017
- † Pleurotomella protocostulata Lozouet, 2017
- Pleurotomella pudens (Watson, 1881)
- Pleurotomella puella Thiele, 1925
- † Pleurotomella quoniamensis (Boussac in Périer, 1941)
- † Pleurotomella rappardi (von Koenen, 1867)
- † Pleurotomella rappardiformis Lozouet, 2017
- Pleurotomella rossi Dell, 1990
- † Pleurotomella rothauseni (Gürs, 1998)
- Pleurotomella rugosa (Laseron, 1954)
- Pleurotomella sandersoni Verrill, 1884
- Pleurotomella sansibarica Thiele, 1925
- Pleurotomella sepulta (Laseron, 1954)
- Pleurotomella siberutensis (Thiele, 1925)
- Pleurotomella simillima Thiele, 1912
- Pleurotomella spicula (Laseron, 1954)
- † Pleurotomella spinosa Lozouet, 2015
- † Pleurotomella striarella (Lamarck, 1804)
- † Pleurotomella striatulata Lamarck, 1822
- Pleurotomella thalassica Dall, 1919
- Pleurotomella tippetti Kantor, Harasewych & Puillandre, 2016
- † Pleurotomella turrita Landau, Harzhauser & Giannuzzi-Savelli, 2022
- Pleurotomella ursula Thiele, 1925
- † Pleurotomella vagans (Koch & Wiechmann, 1872)
- Pleurotomella vaginata Dall, 1927
- Pleurotomella vera Thiele, 1925
- Pleurotomella vercoi (G.B. Sowerby III, 1896)
- † Pleurotomella verticicostata Brébion, 1992
- Pleurotomella virginalis Thiele, 1925
- Pleurotomella ybessa Figueira & Absalão, 2012

== Synonyms ==
This is a long list of synonyms
- Pleurotomella abbreviata Schepman, 1913: synonym of Buccinaria abbreviata (Schepman, 1913) (original combination)
- Pleurotomella abyssorum (Locard, 1897): synonym of Gymnobela abyssorum (Locard, 1897)
- Pleurotomella adelpha Dautzenberg & Fischer, 1896: synonym of Phymorhynchus sulciferus (Bush, 1893)
- Pleurotomella affinis Schepman, 1913: synonym of Cryptodaphne affinis (Schepman, 1913) (original combination)
- Pleurotomella agassizi (Verrill & S. Smith, 1880): synonym of Gymnobela agassizii (Verrill & S. Smith [in Verrill], 1880)
- Pleurotomella aguayoi (Carcelles, 1953): synonym of Austrotoma aguayoi (Carcelles, 1953)
- Pleurotomella aperta Dall, 1927: synonym of Teretiopsis thaumastopsis (Dautzenberg & H. Fischer, 1896)
- Pleurotomella aquilarum engonia Verrill, 1884: synonym of Gymnobela engonia Verrill, 1884
- Pleurotomella araneosa (Watson, 1881): synonym of Xanthodaphne araneosa (R. B. Watson, 1881)
- Pleurotomella argeta Dall, 1890: synonym of Xanthodaphne argeta (Dall, 1890)
- Pleurotomella atlantica Locard, 1897: synonym of Kryptos koehleri (Locard, 1896)
- Pleurotomella atypha Bush, 1893: synonym of Gymnobela atypha (Bush, 1893) (original combination)
- Pleurotomella bairdi [sic]: synonym of Gymnobela bairdii (Verrill & S. Smith [in Verrill], 1884) (misspelling)
- Pleurotomella bairdi Verrill & Smith, 1884: synonym of Gymnobela bairdii (Verrill & S. Smith [in Verrill], 1884)
- Pleurotomella bandella (Dall, 1881): synonym of Benthomangelia bandella (Dall, 1881)
- Pleurotomella bathyiberica Fechter, 1976: synonym of Theta vayssierei (Dautzenberg, 1925)
- Pleurotomella biconica Schepman, 1913: synonym of Acamptodaphne biconica (Schepman, 1913) (original combination)
- Pleurotomella bruneri Verrill & S. Smith [in Verrill], 1884: synonym of Xanthodaphne bruneri (Verrill & S. Smith [in Verrill], 1884) (original combination)
- Pleurotomella bullioides Sykes, 1906: synonym of Lusitanops bullioides (Sykes, 1906) (original combination)
- Pleurotomella cancellata Sysoev, 1988: synonym of Fusobela cancellata (Sysoev, 1988)
- Pleurotomella castanea Dall, 1896: synonym of Phymorhynchus castaneus (Dall, 1896) (original combination)
- Pleurotomella catasarca Dall, 1889: synonym of Theta chariessa (R. B. Watson, 1881)
- Pleurotomella catharinae Verrill & S. Smith, 1884: synonym of Famelica catharinae (Verrill & S. Smith [in Verrill], 1884)
- Pleurotomella ceramensis Schepman, 1913: synonym of Gymnobela ceramensis (Schepman, 1913) (original combination)
- Pleurotomella chariessa (Watson, 1881): synonym of Theta chariessa (R. B. Watson, 1881)
- Pleurotomella clarinda Dall, 1908: synonym of Phymorhynchus clarinda (Dall, 1908) (original combination)
- Pleurotomella climacella Dall, 1895: synonym of Belomitra climacella (Dall, 1895) (original combination)
- † Pleurotomella cossmanni L. Morellet & J. Morellet, 1946: synonym of † Pleurotomella irminonvilla Pacaud, 2021 (invalid: junior homonym of Pleurotomella cossmanni Koperberg, 1931; P. irminonvilla is a replacement name)
- Pleurotomella costlowi Petuch, 1974: synonym of Bathybela tenelluna (Locard, 1897)
- Pleurotomella curta (A. E. Verrill, 1884): synonym of Gymnobela aquilarum (R. B. Watson, 1882)
- Pleurotomella dalli Bush, 1893: synonym of Corinnaeturris leucomata (Dall, 1881)
- Pleurotomella demulcata Locard, 1897: synonym of Kryptos koehleri (Locard, 1896)
- Pleurotomella diastropha Dautzenberg & Fischer, 1896: synonym of Pleurotomella packardii packardii Verrill, A.E., 1872
- Pleurotomella diomedae Verrill, 1884: synonym of Benthomangelia antonia (Dall, 1881)
- Pleurotomella diomedeae Verrill & S. Smith [in Verrill], 1884: synonym of Benthomangelia antonia (Dall, 1881)
- Pleurotomella dubia Schepman, 1913: synonym of Gymnobela dubia (Schepman, 1913) (original combination)
- Pleurotomella ebor Okutani, 1968: synonym of Cryptomella ebor (Okutani, 1968) (original combination)
- Pleurotomella edgariana (Dall, 1889): synonym of Gymnobela edgariana (Dall, 1889)
- Pleurotomella emertoni Verrill & S. Smith [in Verrill], 1884: synonym of Gymnobela emertoni (Verrill & S. Smith [in Verrill], 1884) (original combination)
- Pleurotomella engonia (A. E. Verrill, 1884): synonym of Gymnobela engonia Verrill, 1884
- Pleurotomella esilda Dall, 1908: synonym of Leucosyrinx esilda (Dall, 1908) (original combination)
- Pleurotomella extensaeformis Schepman, 1913: synonym of Mioawateria extensaeformis (Schepman, 1913) (original combination)
- Pleurotomella fastosa Hedley, 1907: synonym of Microdrillia fastosa (Hedley, 1907) (original combination)
- Pleurotomella frielei Verrill, 1885: synonym of Gymnobela frielei (Verrill, 1885) (original combination)
- Pleurotomella fulvotincta (Dautzenberg & Fischer, 1896): synonym of Gymnobela fulvotincta (Dautzenberg & Fischer, 1896)
- Pleurotomella gradata Schepman, 1913: synonym of Cryptodaphne gradata (Schepman, 1913) (original combination)
- Pleurotomella gregaria Sykes, 1906: synonym of Gymnobela leptoglypta (Dautzenberg & Fischer, 1896)
- Pleurotomella gypsina Dall, 1895: synonym of Pleurotomoides gypsina (Dall, 1895)
- Pleurotomella heterogramma Odhner, 1960: synonym of Xanthodaphne heterogramma (Odhner, 1960) (original combination)
- Pleurotomella ida Thiele, 1925: synonym of Philbertia capensis (E. A. Smith, 1882): synonym of Tritonoturris capensis (E. A. Smith, 1882) (junior synonym)
- Pleurotomella illicita (Dall, 1927): synonym of Gymnobela illicita Dall, 1927
- Pleurotomella isogonia Dall, 1908: synonym of Gymnobela isogonia (Dall, 1908) (original combination)
- Pleurotomella jeffreysi Verrill, 1885: synonym of Theta chariessa (R. B. Watson, 1881)
- Pleurotomella koehleri Locard, 1896: synonym of Kryptos koehleri (Locard, 1896)
- Pleurotomella leptalea Bush, 1893: synonym of Xanthodaphne leptalea (Bush, 1893) (original combination)
- Pleurotomella lineola Dall, 1927: synonym of Gymnobela lineola (Dall, 1927) (dubious synonym)
- Pleurotomella lusitanica Sykes, 1906: synonym of Lusitanops lusitanica [sic]: synonym of Lusitanops lusitanicus (Sykes, 1906) (original combination)
- Pleurotomella lyronuclea A. H. Clarke, 1959: synonym of Theta lyronuclea (A. H. Clarke, 1959) (original combination)
- Pleurotomella megalembryon (Dautzenberg & H. Fischer, 1896): synonym of Azorilla megalembryon (Dautzenberg & H. Fischer, 1896)
- Pleurotomella oceanica Dall, 1908: synonym of Cryptomella oceanica (Dall, 1908) (original combination)
- Pleurotomella oceanida Dall, 1919: synonym of Pleurotomella orariana (Dall, 1908)
- Pleurotomella pachia (Watson, 1881): synonym of Xanthodaphne pachia (R. B. Watson, 1881)
- Pleurotomella polystephanus Dall, 1908: synonym of Cryptogemma polystephanus (Dall, 1908) (original combination)
- Pleurotomella pyriformis Schepman, 1913: synonym of Xanthodaphne pyriformis (Schepman, 1913) (original combination)
- Pleurotomella raineri Engl, 2008: synonym of Xanthodaphne raineri (Engl, 2008) (original combination)
- Pleurotomella reconditum (Locard, 1891): synonym of Bela nuperrima (Tiberi, 1855)
- Pleurotomella rhytismeis Melvill, 1910: synonym of Taranis rhytismeis (Melvill, 1910) (original combination)
- Pleurotomella saffordi Verrill & S. Smith [in Verrill], 1884: synonym of Pleurotomella packardii Verrill, 1872
- Pleurotomella simplicissima Dall, 1907: synonym of Paraspirotropis simplicissima (Dall, 1907) (original combination)
- Pleurotomella stearina Dall, 1889: synonym of Theta chariessa (R. B. Watson, 1881)
- Pleurotomella suffusa (Dall, 1890): synonym of Xanthodaphne suffusa (Dall, 1890)
- Pleurotomella sulcifera Bush, 1893: synonym of Phymorhynchus sulciferus (Bush, 1893) (original combination)
- Pleurotomella tcherniai (Gaillard, 1955): synonym of Xymenopsis tcherniai (Gaillard, 1954)
- Pleurotomella tincta Verrill, 1885: synonym of Gymnobela emertoni (Verrill & S. Smith [in Verrill], 1884)
- Pleurotomella virgo Okutani, 1966: synonym of Bathytoma virgo (Okutani, 1966) (original combination)
- Pleurotomella vitrea Verrill, 1885: synonym of Gymnobela agassizii (Verrill & S. Smith [in Verrill], 1880)
- Pleurotomella xylona Dall, 1908: synonym of Gymnobela xylona (Dall, 1908) (original combination)
