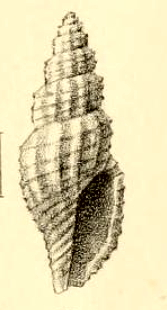
- Original image of a shell of Pleurotomella amphiblestrum

Scientific classification
- Kingdom: Animalia
- Phylum: Mollusca
- Class: Gastropoda
- Subclass: Caenogastropoda
- Order: Neogastropoda
- Superfamily: Conoidea
- Family: Raphitomidae
- Genus: Pleurotomella
- Species: P. amphiblestrum

Binomial name
- Pleurotomella amphiblestrum (Melvill, 1904)

Synonyms
- Clathurella amphiblestrum Melvill, 1904; Daphnella (Pleurotomella) amphiblestrum Melvill, 1906

= Pleurotomella amphiblestrum =

Species of gastropod

Pleurotomella amphiblestrum is a species of sea snail, a marine gastropod mollusk in the family Raphitomidae.

== Description ==
The length of this shell attains 7.5 mm, its diameter 2.5 mm.

== Distribution ==
This marine species occurs in the Gulf of Oman
