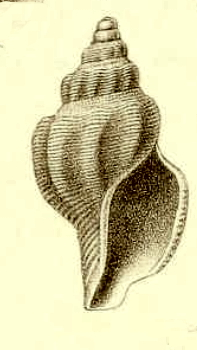
- Original image of a shell of Pleurotomella simillima

Scientific classification
- Kingdom: Animalia
- Phylum: Mollusca
- Class: Gastropoda
- Subclass: Caenogastropoda
- Order: Neogastropoda
- Superfamily: Conoidea
- Family: Raphitomidae
- Genus: Pleurotomella
- Species: P. simillima

Binomial name
- Pleurotomella simillima Thiele, 1912

Synonyms
- Pleurotomella (Anomalotomella) simillima Thiele, 1912· accepted, alternate representation

= Pleurotomella simillima =

Species of gastropod

Pleurotomella simillima is a species of sea snail, a marine gastropod mollusk in the family Raphitomidae.

== Description ==
The shell length varies from 6 mm and 11 mm.

== Distribution ==
This marine species occurs in the Weddell Sea, Antarctica and off Visokoi Island, SE of island, South Sandwich Islands, South Atlantic Ocean at a depth between 93 m and 600 m.
