= Pleurotomella obesa =

Scientific classification
- Kingdom: Animalia
- Phylum: Mollusca
- Class: Gastropoda
- Subclass: Caenogastropoda
- Order: Neogastropoda
- Superfamily: Conoidea
- Family: Raphitomidae
- Genus: Pleurotomella
- Species: P. obesa

Binomial name
- Pleurotomella obesa Bouchet & Warén, 1980

Species of gastropod

Pleurotomella obesa is a species of sea snail, a marine gastropod mollusk in the family Raphitomidae.

== Description ==
The length of the shell attains 10.5 mm, its diameter 6 mm.

== Distribution ==
This species occurs in the Eastern Atlantic Ocean.
