= Pleurotomella dinora =

Scientific classification
- Kingdom: Animalia
- Phylum: Mollusca
- Class: Gastropoda
- Subclass: Caenogastropoda
- Order: Neogastropoda
- Superfamily: Conoidea
- Family: Raphitomidae
- Genus: Pleurotomella
- Species: P. dinora

Binomial name
- Pleurotomella dinora Dall, 1908

Synonyms
- Pleurotomella (Pleurotomella) dinora Dall, 1908

Species of sea snail

Pleurotomella dinora is a species of sea snail, a marine gastropod mollusk in the family Raphitomidae.

== Description ==
The length of the (decollated) shell attains 15 mm, its diameter 7 mm.

(Original description) The small shell is short-fusiform and stout. It is white with a pale yellowish periostracum. It contains about seven whorls. The apex is defective. The subsequent whorls are rather rapidly increasing, with an appressed suture behind a smooth and constricted anal fasciole. In front of which the shell is shouldered by a series of short, slightly protective ribs, of which, on the penultimate whorl there are fifteen, with subequal interspaces and crossed by half a dozen irregularly spaced spiral striations. These striae are ill-defined, and on the body whorl extend over the base of the shell to the siphonal canal. On the last half of the body whorl the ribs become obsolete The aperture is narrow. The anal sulcus at the suture is wide and deep. The outer lip in front of it is prominently arcuate, thin and simple. The columellar lip is smooth with a thin wash of callus. The columella is twisted and rapidly attenuated. The axis is impervious. The siphonal canal is moderately wide, short and slightly recurved.

== Distribution ==
This marine species occurs off the Galapagos Islands.
