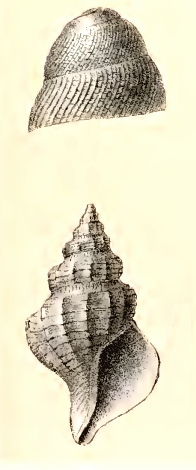
- Original image of a shell of Pleurotomella cala

Scientific classification
- Kingdom: Animalia
- Phylum: Mollusca
- Class: Gastropoda
- Subclass: Caenogastropoda
- Order: Neogastropoda
- Superfamily: Conoidea
- Family: Raphitomidae
- Genus: Pleurotomella
- Species: P. cala

Binomial name
- Pleurotomella cala (R.B. Watson, 1886)

Synonyms
- Clathurella cala R.B. Watson, 1886; Philbertia cala (R. B. Watson, 1886)

= Pleurotomella cala =

Species of gastropod

Philbertia cala is a species of sea snail, a marine gastropod mollusk in the family Raphitomidae.

== Description ==
The length of the shell attains 5 mm.

(Original description) The delicate white shell is angulated, obliquely plicate, spiralled, and scalar. It has a conical spire, a chestnut tip, a deep suture, a short body whorl, a very contracted base, and a short, small, straight snout.

Sculpture: Longitudinals: there are on the body whorl about 15 (the number slowly decreases up the spire) narrow pinched-up oblique ribs which take their origin below the sinus-scar and die out on the base. They form a high bunchy shoulder to the whorls. On the upper whorls they extend to the lower suture. The whole surface is scored with fine hairlike lines of growth. Spirals: there are feeble rounded distant threads which do not extend to the sinus-area. The broad flat intervals have much finer threads, generally one or two. On the snout the threads are all alike and somewhat closer than above. The upper whorls are right-angled at the shoulder, but the keel becomes obsolete on the body whorl.

The colour of the shell is white. The spire is rather high, conical, scalar and sharp. The protoconch consists of 3½ very small turbinate whorls, of which the extreme tip is immersed and tabulate. They are chestnut-coloured, and are scored with excessively fine threadlets, which are straight and longitudinal above but cancellate on the lower part of the whorls. The last of these embryonic whorls ends with a deeply sinuated outer lip. The shell contains 5½ whorls, in addition to those of the protoconch. They increase rapidly in width more than in height. Above they have a flat shoulder, below which they are bluntly angled, and from this point they are shortly cylindrically convex. The last whorl is broad and short, with a round but rapidly contracted base, which runs out into a very small, short, straight, lopsided aperture. The suture is horizontal, lapping up on the superior whorl and is only distinct from the angle at which the whorls meet. The aperture is short and pear-shaped, angled above and channelled below. The outer lip is very thin .It has a wide U-shaped sinus lying close up to the suture, from which it is separated by a very minute shelf. Below the sinus the edge sweeps prodigiously forward and then runs straight down the snout.

== Distribution ==
This marine species occurs off Southern Brazil and in the Southeast Atlantic
