= Pleurotomella tippetti =

Scientific classification
- Kingdom: Animalia
- Phylum: Mollusca
- Class: Gastropoda
- Subclass: Caenogastropoda
- Order: Neogastropoda
- Superfamily: Conoidea
- Family: Raphitomidae
- Genus: Pleurotomella
- Species: P. tippetti

Binomial name
- Pleurotomella tippetti Kantor, Harasewych & Puillandre, 2016

Synonyms
- Pleurotomella (Anomalotomella) tippetti Kantor, Harasewych & Puillandre, 2016· accepted, alternate representation

Species of gastropod

Pleurotomella tippetti is a species of sea snail, a marine gastropod mollusk in the family Raphitomidae.

== Distribution ==
This species occurs off the South Orkneys
