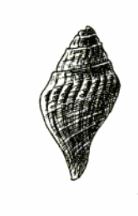
- Original image of a shell of Pleurotomella bellistriata

Scientific classification
- Kingdom: Animalia
- Phylum: Mollusca
- Class: Gastropoda
- Subclass: Caenogastropoda
- Order: Neogastropoda
- Superfamily: Conoidea
- Family: Raphitomidae
- Genus: Pleurotomella
- Species: †P. bellistriata

Binomial name
- †Pleurotomella bellistriata (W.B. Clark, 1895)

Synonyms
- † Mangilia (Pleurotomella) bellistriata W.B. Clark, 1895 (original combination)

= Pleurotomella bellistriata =

Extinct species of gastropod

Pleurotomella bellistriata is an extinct species of sea snail, a marine gastropod mollusk in the family Raphitomidae.

== Description ==
The length of the shell attains 25 mm, its diameter 12 mm.

(Original description) The small, subfusiform shell has a rather short pointed spire and contains about 5 whorls. The large body whorl is somewhat inflated. The earlier whorls are nearly flat. The surface is sculptured with numerous alternating larger and smaller spiral threads crossed by fine wavy lines and by irregularly spaced oblique ribs, about twenty in number on the body whorl. The ribs are strongest at the shoulder, gradually disappearing both posteriorly and anteriorly. The shell is somewhat excavated behind the shoulder. The aperture is narrow. This form is from the Woodstock stage.

== Distribution ==
Fossils of this marine species were found in Oligocene strata of Maryland, USA.
