= Pleurotomella petiti =

Scientific classification
- Kingdom: Animalia
- Phylum: Mollusca
- Class: Gastropoda
- Subclass: Caenogastropoda
- Order: Neogastropoda
- Superfamily: Conoidea
- Family: Raphitomidae
- Genus: Pleurotomella
- Species: P. petiti

Binomial name
- Pleurotomella petiti Kantor, Harasewych & Puillandre, 2016

Synonyms
- Pleurotomella (Anomalotomella) petiti Kantor, Harasewych & Puillandre, 2016· accepted, alternate representation

Species of gastropod

Pleurotomella petiti is a species of sea snail, a marine gastropod mollusk in the family Raphitomidae.

== Distribution ==
This species occurs in Antarctic waters.
