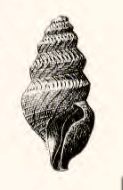
- Original image of a shell of Pleurotomella enora

Scientific classification
- Kingdom: Animalia
- Phylum: Mollusca
- Class: Gastropoda
- Subclass: Caenogastropoda
- Order: Neogastropoda
- Superfamily: Conoidea
- Family: Raphitomidae
- Genus: Pleurotomella
- Species: P. enora

Binomial name
- Pleurotomella enora (Dall, 1908)

Synonyms
- Mangilia enora Dall, 1908

= Pleurotomella enora =

Species of sea snail

Pleurotomella enora is a species of sea snail, a marine gastropod mollusk in the family Raphitomidae.

== Description ==
The length of the shell attains 9.5 mm, its diameter 4.2 mm.

(Original description) The small shell is yellowish-white. It is decollate with about six whorls beside the (lost) protoconch. The spire is longer than the aperture. The suture is distinct, not appressed, with a broad anal fasciole in front of it, arcuately sculptured by lunate wrinkles following the lines of growth and in the earlier whorls elevated into sharp wrinkles at regular intervals, which are carried more or less distinctly over the anterior part of the whorls. In front of the somewhat concave fasciole the whorls are rounded and spirally sculptured with numerous close, very fine, sharp, spiral threads which cover the whorl, becoming coarser, less regular, and less crowded toward the siphonal canal. The aperture is short and lunate. The outer lip shows a broad, deep, rounded anal sulcus close to the suture. The lip in front of it is thin, sharp, and strongly arcuately protractive. The body is smooth. The columella is very short, smooth, obliquely truncate. The siphonal canal is very short, deep, recurved, forming a marked siphonal fasciole. The operculum is absent.

== Distribution ==
This marine species occurs off Ecuador.
