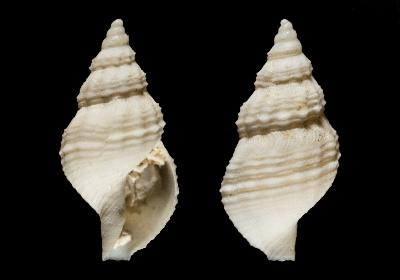
- Original image of a shell of †Pleurotomella intermedia

Scientific classification
- Kingdom: Animalia
- Phylum: Mollusca
- Class: Gastropoda
- Subclass: Caenogastropoda
- Order: Neogastropoda
- Superfamily: Conoidea
- Family: Raphitomidae
- Genus: Pleurotomella
- Species: †P. intermedia

Binomial name
- †Pleurotomella intermedia Gougerot & Le Renard, 1982

= Pleurotomella intermedia =

Extinct species of gastropod

Pleurotomella intermedia is an extinct species of sea snail, a marine gastropod mollusk in the family Raphitomidae.

== Distribution ==
Fossils of this marine species were found in Oise, France
