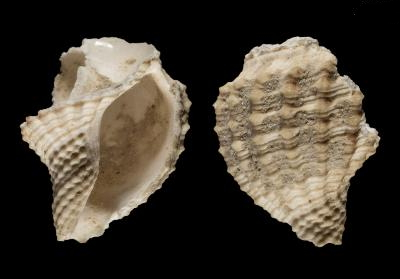
- Original image of a shell of Pleurotomella demosia

Scientific classification
- Kingdom: Animalia
- Phylum: Mollusca
- Class: Gastropoda
- Subclass: Caenogastropoda
- Order: Neogastropoda
- Superfamily: Conoidea
- Family: Raphitomidae
- Genus: Pleurotomella
- Species: P. demosia

Binomial name
- Pleurotomella demosia (Dautzenberg & Fischer, 1896)

Synonyms
- Mangilia bulbulinula Locard, 1897; Pleurotoma demosia Dautzenberg & Fischer, 1896

= Pleurotomella demosia =

Species of gastropod

Pleurotomella demosia is a species of sea snail, a marine gastropod mollusk in the family Raphitomidae.

== Description ==
The length of the shell attains 8 mm, its diameter is 2.9 mm.

== Distribution ==
This marine species occurs off the Azores.
