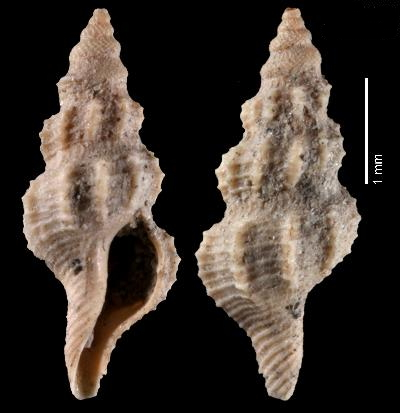
- Original image of a shell of Pleurotomella bateroensis

Scientific classification
- Kingdom: Animalia
- Phylum: Mollusca
- Class: Gastropoda
- Subclass: Caenogastropoda
- Order: Neogastropoda
- Superfamily: Conoidea
- Family: Raphitomidae
- Genus: Pleurotomella
- Species: †P. bateroensis

Binomial name
- †Pleurotomella bateroensis Lozouet, 1999

= Pleurotomella bateroensis =

Extinct species of gastropod

Pleurotomella bateroensis is an extinct species of sea snail, a marine gastropod mollusk in the family Raphitomidae.

== Description ==
The length, that is often colored beige, of the shell attains 6 mm.

== Distribution ==
Fossils of this marine species were found in Oligocene strata in Aquitaine, France.
