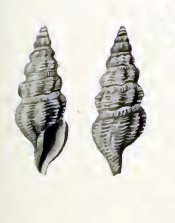
- Drawing of a shell of Pleurotomella clathurellaeformis

Scientific classification
- Kingdom: Animalia
- Phylum: Mollusca
- Class: Gastropoda
- Subclass: Caenogastropoda
- Order: Neogastropoda
- Superfamily: Conoidea
- Family: Raphitomidae
- Genus: Pleurotomella
- Species: P. clathurellaeformis

Binomial name
- Pleurotomella clathurellaeformis Schepman, 1913

= Pleurotomella clathurellaeformis =

Species of gastropod

Pleurotomella clathurellaeformis is a species of sea snail, a marine gastropod mollusk in the family Raphitomidae.

== Description ==
The length of the shell attains 8¼ mm, its diameter 3 mm.

(Original description) The white shell is elongately-fusiform, thin and transparent. It contains about 9 whorls, of which about 3 form a reddish-brown protoconch, composed of convex whorls, with riblets in different directions, but the protoconch being rather worn, the sculpture is not prominent. The subsequent whorls are convex, with a narrow, excavated part below the deep suture. The excavation is crossed by numerous, slightly curved, axial riblets. The convex part of whorls is sculptured by strong, rounded, oblique, axial ribs, 11 in number on the body whorl, crossed by strong spirals, 6 in number on penultimate whorl, of which 4 are stronger and are especially prominent on the crest of axial ribs. These ribs disappear on the base of the body whorl, which, as well as the rather short siphonal canal is lirate. The aperture is oval, angular above, ending below in a rather narrow, slightly curved, compressed siphonal canal. The peristome is thin, with a narrow, shallow sinus above. The columellar margin is concave, with a thin layer of enamel, directed to the left near the siphonal canal.

== Distribution ==
This species occurs in the Ceram Sea, Indonesia.
