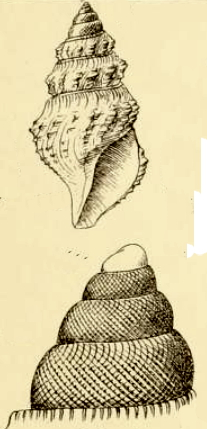
- Original image of a shell and (enlarged) protoconch of Pleurotomella sandersoni

Scientific classification
- Kingdom: Animalia
- Phylum: Mollusca
- Class: Gastropoda
- Subclass: Caenogastropoda
- Order: Neogastropoda
- Superfamily: Conoidea
- Family: Raphitomidae
- Genus: Pleurotomella
- Species: P. sandersoni

Binomial name
- Pleurotomella sandersoni Verrill, 1884

Synonyms
- Gymnobela agassizii sandersoni (Verrill, A.E., 1884)

= Pleurotomella sandersoni =

Species of gastropod

Pleurotomella sandersoni is a species of sea snail, a marine gastropod mollusk in the family Raphitomidae.

== Description ==
The length of the shell attains 6.5 mm, its diameter 3.5 mm.

(Original description) The small, delicate shell is fusiform with an elevated and very acute spire and a slightly elongated, straight siphonal canal. The whorls are angulated and turreted, sculptured with ribs and revolving lines, which form rows of small, sharp nodules at their intersection around the periphery, and especially at the shoulder. The shell contains four whorls below the protoconch, which is unusually elongated and composed of four pale chestnut-colored whorls, which are finely and regularly cancellated. The apical whorl is very minute and prominent, giving the spire a very acute tip. The nuclear whorls increase rapidly and regularly in size, and are regularly rounded. The sculpture passes somewhat gradually into that of the next lower whorl, which is distinctly ribbed and carinated, with a single row of sharp tubercles around the middle. The lower whorls of the spire have the shoulder at about the middle, and below it two or three raised cinguli, which form as many rows of small acute nodules in crossing the ribs. These are similar to those on the carina of the shoulder, but usually a little smaller. There is commonly another row of smaller tubercles of the same kind just above the shoulder. On the body whorl there are from fifteen to eighteen cinguli, which are unequal in size and decrease in prominence from the carina to the base of the siphonal canal. Most of these form small, sharp nodules in crossing the ribs. The ribs are a little prominent, rather oblique, sharp at summit, and separated by concave interspaces of somewhat greater width. On the upper whorls they run from just above the shoulder forward to the suture. On the body whorl they curve strongly forward in the middle and then recede and disappear before reaching the base of the siphonal canal. The subsutural band is very wide, strongly sloping, and somewhat concave just above the shoulder. It is covered with numerous, rather conspicuous, thin, raised riblets, which are strongly excurved in the middle and bend forward before reaching the suture. Two or sometimes three cinguli exist on the subsutural band. The uppermost of these is just below the suture and forms there a small carina, above which the suture is distinctly channeled. The surface between the ribs is everywhere covered by fine, distinct, flexuous lines of growth. The aperture is long-ovate, rather narrow, angulated externally. The outer lip is thin and sharp, with a broad, rounded posterior sinus, just above the shoulder and a little removed from the suture. Below the shoulder the lip arches forward in a broad curve, and becomes incurved at the base of the siphonal canal, which is rather contracted and a little bent to the right and slightly everted at tip. The columella is short and nearly straight, its inner edge forming a strong sigmoid curvature. The epidermis is indistinct. The color of the shell is white, with the exception of the light yellowish brown protoconch.

== Distribution ==
This marine species occurs off Southeast USA.
