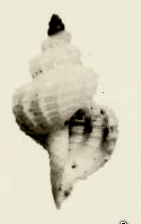
- Original image of a shell of Pleurotomella coelorhaphe

Scientific classification
- Kingdom: Animalia
- Phylum: Mollusca
- Class: Gastropoda
- Subclass: Caenogastropoda
- Order: Neogastropoda
- Superfamily: Conoidea
- Family: Raphitomidae
- Genus: Pleurotomella
- Species: P. coelorhaphe

Binomial name
- Pleurotomella coelorhaphe (Dautzenberg & Fischer, 1896)

Synonyms
- Pleurotoma coelorhaphe Dautzenberg & Fischer, 1896

= Pleurotomella coelorhaphe =

Species of gastropod

Pleurotomella coelorhaphe is a species of sea snail, a marine gastropod mollusk in the family Raphitomidae.

== Description ==
The shell grows to a length of 7 mm.

== Distribution ==
This species occurs in the Atlantic Ocean off the Azores.
