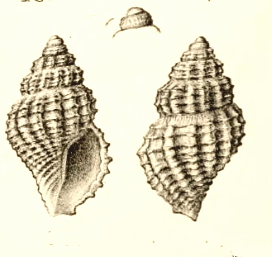
- Original image of a shell of Pleurotomella evadne

Scientific classification
- Kingdom: Animalia
- Phylum: Mollusca
- Class: Gastropoda
- Subclass: Caenogastropoda
- Order: Neogastropoda
- Superfamily: Conoidea
- Family: Raphitomidae
- Genus: Pleurotomella
- Species: P. evadne

Binomial name
- Pleurotomella evadne Melvill, 1912

Synonyms
- Glyphostoma evadne Melvill, 1912

= Pleurotomella evadne =

Species of gastropod

Pleurotomella evadne is a species of sea snail, a marine gastropod mollusk in the family Raphitomidae.

== Description ==
The length of the shell attains 4 mm, its diameter 1.55 mm.

The white, rather stout shell is small, reduced in length and rounded out. It contains six whorls. The protoconch is smooth and globose. The subsequent whorls are impressed at the suture. They are swollen and show oblique, wide ribs with about 18 on the body whorl. There are only a few spiral lirae. These are undeveloped. The quadrate interstices are depressed. The outer lip is thin, simple. The aperture is oblong and white on its interior. The siphonal canal is short.

== Distribution ==
This species occurs in the Persian Gulf and in the Gulf of Oman.
