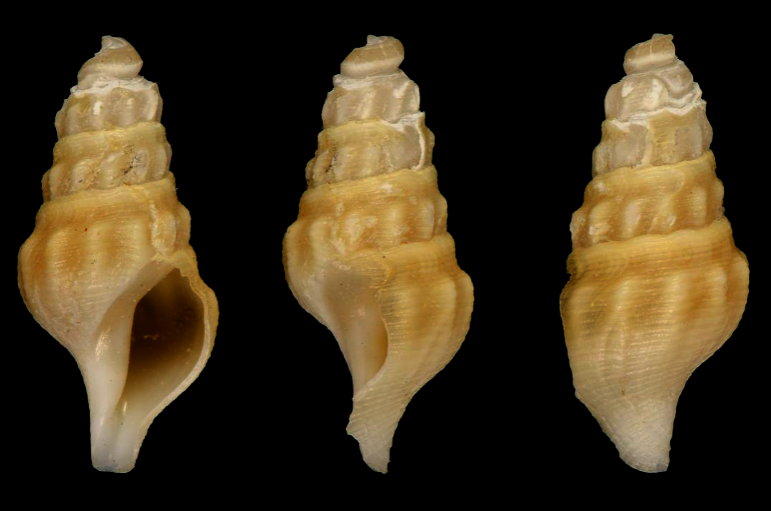
- Shell of Pleurotomella allisoni (holotype at the Smithsonian Institution)

Scientific classification
- Kingdom: Animalia
- Phylum: Mollusca
- Class: Gastropoda
- Subclass: Caenogastropoda
- Order: Neogastropoda
- Superfamily: Conoidea
- Family: Raphitomidae
- Genus: Pleurotomella
- Species: P. allisoni

Binomial name
- Pleurotomella allisoni Rehder & Ladd, 1973

= Pleurotomella allisoni =

Species of gastropod

Pleurotomella allisoni Rehder & Ladd, 1973 is a species of sea snail, a marine gastropod mollusk. It was originally described in the family Raphitomidae. This is an older combination and the name currently used is Leucosyrinx allisoni (Rehder & Ladd, 1973). It is part of the family Pseudomelatomidae.

== Description ==
The length (incomplete) of the shell attains 17.6 mm, its diameter is 6.6 mm.

== Distribution ==
This marine species occurs on Mid-Pacific Seamounts between the Marshall Islands and Hawaii at depths between 1,582 m and 1,617 m.
