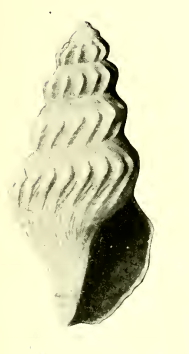
- Original image of a shell of Pleurotomella thalassica

Scientific classification
- Kingdom: Animalia
- Phylum: Mollusca
- Class: Gastropoda
- Subclass: Caenogastropoda
- Order: Neogastropoda
- Superfamily: Conoidea
- Family: Raphitomidae
- Genus: Pleurotomella
- Species: P. thalassica

Binomial name
- Pleurotomella thalassica Dall, 1919

= Pleurotomella thalassica =

Species of gastropod

Pleurotomella thalassica is a species of sea snail, a marine gastropod mollusk in the family Raphitomidae.

== Description ==
The length of the shell attains 10 mm, its diameter 5 mm.

(Original description) The small, snow white shell contains five or more whorls exclusive of the (lost) protoconch. The suture is distinct, appressed, the fasciole in front of it constricted, giving the whorls a conspicuous shoulder. The spiral sculpture consists of a few obsolete threads on the base, not extending to the siphonal canal and with wider interspaces. The axial sculpture consists of (on the penultimate whorl 16) strong obliquely protractive ribs, most prominent at the shoulder where they begin, disappearing on the base and obsolete on the body whorl. The incremental lines are inconspicuous. The aperture is rather wide. The anal sulcus is close to the suture, rounded, rather wide but not deep. The outer lip is thin and much produced. The inner lip is erased. The columella is short. The siphonal canal is short, deep, distinct, recurved, with a distinct siphonal fasciole.

== Distribution ==
This marine species was found in Tillamook Bay, Oregon, USA.
