= Pleurotomella expeditionis =

Scientific classification
- Kingdom: Animalia
- Phylum: Mollusca
- Class: Gastropoda
- Subclass: Caenogastropoda
- Order: Neogastropoda
- Superfamily: Conoidea
- Family: Raphitomidae
- Genus: Pleurotomella
- Species: P. expeditionis

Binomial name
- Pleurotomella expeditionis (Dell, 1956)

Synonyms
- Asperdaphne expeditionis Dell, 1956 (original combination)

Species of gastropod

Pleurotomella expeditionis is a species of sea snail, a marine gastropod mollusk in the family Raphitomidae.

== Description ==
The length of the shell attains 6 mm, its diameter 3 mm.

== Distribution ==
This marine species occurs off the Chatham Islands.
