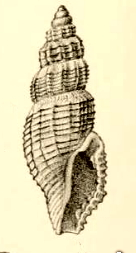
- Original image of a shell of Pleurotomella hypermnestra

Scientific classification
- Kingdom: Animalia
- Phylum: Mollusca
- Class: Gastropoda
- Subclass: Caenogastropoda
- Order: Neogastropoda
- Superfamily: Conoidea
- Family: Raphitomidae
- Genus: Pleurotomella
- Species: P. hypermnestra

Binomial name
- Pleurotomella hypermnestra Melvill, 1912

= Pleurotomella hypermnestra =

Species of gastropod

Pleurotomella hypermnestra is a species of sea snail, a marine gastropod mollusk in the family Raphitomidae.

== Description ==
The length of the shell attains 6 mm, its diameter 2 mm.

The small, pale, straw-white shell has a fusiform shape. It contains eight whorls. The three whorls in the protoconch are ochreous and smooth. The subsequent whorls are impressed at the suture. The longitudinal ribs are not numerous (about ten in the body whorl). The few spiral lirae are undeveloped. The oblong- quadrate interstices are depressed. The aperture is oblong, incrassate and straw-white on its interior. The sinus is wide and not deep. The siphonal canal is short. The columella is rather straight and simple.

== Distribution ==
This marine species occurs in the Persian Gulf.
