= Pleurotomella pudens =

Scientific classification
- Kingdom: Animalia
- Phylum: Mollusca
- Class: Gastropoda
- Subclass: Caenogastropoda
- Order: Neogastropoda
- Superfamily: Conoidea
- Family: Raphitomidae
- Genus: Pleurotomella
- Species: P. pudens

Binomial name
- Pleurotomella pudens (Watson, 1881)

Synonyms
- Gymnobela (Theta) pudens (Watson, 1881); Pleurotoma (Defrancia) pudens Watson, 1881 (original combination)

Species of gastropod

Pleurotomella pudens is a species of sea snail, a marine gastropod mollusk in the family Raphitomidae.

== Description ==
The length of the shell attains 5.3 mm, its diameter 2.5 mm.

(Original description) The white shell is small, oblong, smooth, with a high, subscalar, small and sharp-pointed apex, a short and scarcely swollen body whorl, and a conical base produced into a broadish, triangular, lop-sided aperture.

Sculpture. Longitudinals – besides hairlike lines of growth, there are some faint, very oblique, upwardly convex folds, which are obsolete on the earlier and on the last whorls. Spirals – the surface is covered with superficial rounded threads which, obsolete in the sinus-area, are feeble on the body, but sharper and more distinct on the base and aperture. There is a very faint angulation below the sinus-area.

The colour of the thin shell is semi-transparent white, with hardly any gloss.

The spire is conical, subscalar from the slight short tumidity below the suture. The protoconch consists of 4 embryonic whorls, which are buff, darkening to orange at the tip. They are a little broadly conical, rounded, with a slight angulation, and parted by a distinct suture. They rise to a very minute, spirally scratched, round, and very slightly prominent knob. They are sculptured with raised bars, which are straight and simple above, but oblique and crossed below. The shell contains 7½ whorls in all. They are slightly concave and shouldered in the sinus-area, which is bordered by a faint angulation, below which they are slightly tumid, without any contraction into the inferior suture. The body whorl, which is rather small, has a conical base produced into a broadish, triangular, one-sided aperture. The suture is slight, inasmuch as the inferior whorl laps up on the one above. But there is an appreciable constriction. The aperture is oblong and pointed above. There is no siphonal canal below except the channel behind the columella. The outer lip is very thin. Its curve is somewhat flattened. Its edge forms a very regular sweep with a rather high shoulder above, between which and the body lies the deepish, but broad, open-mouthed sinus. The inner lip is very thin and narrow, dying out early on the scarcely oblique or twisted edge of the longish, straight, and conical columella, the point of which comes short of the lip-edge, and whose junction with the body is concave.

== Distribution ==
This marine species occurs off Puerto Rico.
