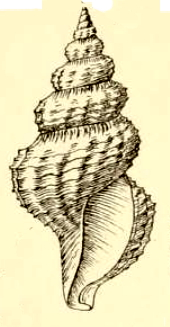
- Original image of a shell of Pleurotomella benedicti

Scientific classification
- Kingdom: Animalia
- Phylum: Mollusca
- Class: Gastropoda
- Subclass: Caenogastropoda
- Order: Neogastropoda
- Superfamily: Conoidea
- Family: Raphitomidae
- Genus: Pleurotomella
- Species: P. benedicti

Binomial name
- Pleurotomella benedicti Verrill, 1884

Synonyms
- Pleurotomella packardii benedicti Verrill, A.E. & S.I. Smith, 1884

= Pleurotomella benedicti =

Species of gastropod

Pleurotomella benedicti is a species of sea snail, a marine gastropod mollusk in the family Raphitomidae.

== Description ==
The length of the shell attains 17 mm, its diameter 8 mm.

(Original description) The fusiform shell is moderately stout, with a high, regularly tapered spire, and very convex, shouldered whorls. These have strong, oblique, transverse ribs rendered nodulous by well-developed, raised cinguli. The shell contains six whorls, below the chestnut-colored protoconch. The suture is deep, not very oblique. The subsutural band is rather broad, concave, nearly smooth, contrasting strongly with the rest of the whorls. Its sculpture consists only of the deeply concave lines of growth, parallel with the notch in the outer lip. Below the subsutural band the whorls are abruptly swollen, forming a rounded shoulder. The transverse ribs, commencing at the shoulder, are prominently raised, rather oblique, and extend entirely across the whorls of the spire, becoming smaller next the suture. On the body whorl they extend to the base of the siphonal canal. They are obtuse at summit and separated by wider, deeply concave interspaces. On the last whorls there are about sixteen ribs. Both the ribs and interspaces are crossed by well-marked, somewhat unequal, raised, revolving lines, separated by narrow grooves. These, in passing over the ribs, produce small, somewhat conical, unequal nodules, which give a somewhat rough appearance to the surface of the shell. One of the spiral lines just above the suture and one or two of those at the shoulder are stronger than the rest. Between the ribs the revolving lines are roughened by fine lines of growth. The four nuclear whorls are evenly rounded and in strong contrast with those that follow them. The first one is very minute, forming a very acute apex. The surface is finely cancellated by two sets of lines running obliquely in opposite directions. The aperture is elongated and rather broad in the middle. The outer lip has a deep and broad posterior sinus, below which it projects strongly forward and is regularly arched to the base of the siphonal canal. The canal is narrow, nearly straight, slightly prolonged. The columella is straight and tapered, with its inner edge forming a slightly sinuous curve. The inner lip is smooth and polished, with a thin coat of enamel which extends somewhat forward in a regular curve on the body whorl. The color is white with a pale grayish tinge, with the exception of the whorls in the protoconch, which are deep chestnut-brown.

== Distribution ==
P. benedicti can be found in Atlantic waters, ranging from the coast of Massachusetts south to the Lesser Antilles.
