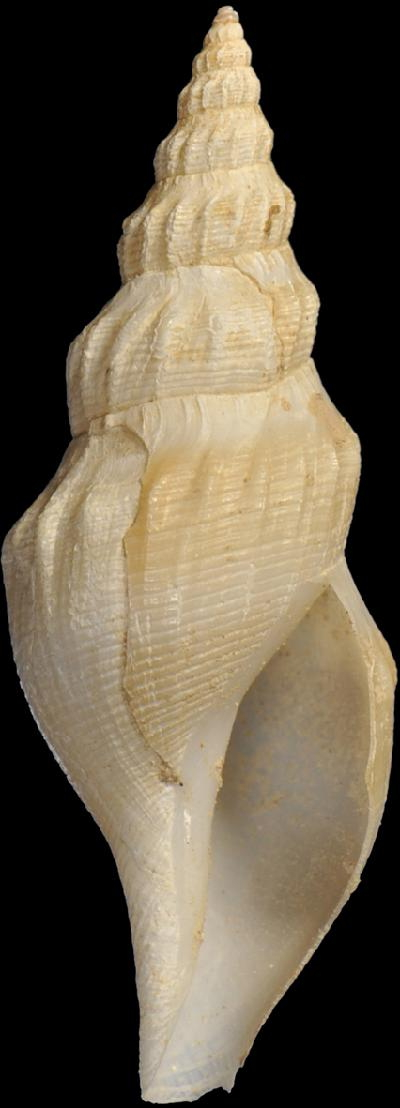
- Original image of a shell of Pleurotomella porcellana (specimen at MNHN, Paris)

Scientific classification
- Kingdom: Animalia
- Phylum: Mollusca
- Class: Gastropoda
- Subclass: Caenogastropoda
- Order: Neogastropoda
- Superfamily: Conoidea
- Family: Raphitomidae
- Genus: Pleurotomella
- Species: P. porcellana

Binomial name
- Pleurotomella porcellana (R.B. Watson, 1886)

Synonyms
- Clathurella porcellana R.B. Watson, 1886

= Pleurotomella porcellana =

Species of gastropod

Pleurotomella porcellana is a species of sea snail, a marine gastropod mollusk in the family Raphitomidae.

== Description ==
The length of the shell attains 22.3 mm.

(Original description) The light but strong, porcellaneous shell is angulated, tuberculately ribbed, spiralled and subscalar. It has a high conical spire, chestnut-tipped, with a distinct suture, a longish body whorl, a rounded produced base, and a drawn-out, truncated, one-sided snout.

Sculpture: there are crowded unequal lines of growth, which at the suture are gathered into fine distant puckers on the angle of the whorls. These puckerings rise on the upper whorls into finely and sharply tubercled straight riblets, which on the body whorl are numerous, obsolete, and oblique. On the penultimate whorl there are about 20 of them. Spirals: in the sinus-area there are just perceptible traces of spiral lines. About the angle of the whorls small impressed furrows begin to appear. On the whole body these are strong, equal, and parted by broad flat intervals. Toward the point of the base they become stronger, and generally have a minute thread in the bottom. On the snout they become more crowded and parted by rounded threads of the same strength and form as themselves. The angle of the whorls occurs about the middle of each, and is sharp above, but feeble and blunt on the body whorl.

The colour of the shell is porcellanous white, under a straw-coloured membranaceous epidermis. The spire is high, conical and subscalar. The protoconch is very small and (apparently, for the tip is broken) sharp. Two whorls remain, 1½ to 2 have been broken. They are russet-yellow, the last ends in a sinuated lip. The upper part of each is scored, with short straight bars above and cancellations below. The shell contains 6½ whorls besides those of the protoconch. Above they have a sloping, just appreciably concave shoulder, about the middle each is obtusely carinated. This keel is sharp above, but very feeble on the elongated rounded body-whorl. The base is drawn out into a longish triangular snout, which is squarely truncated in front. The suture is oblique, fine, but distinct. The aperture is elongately pear-shaped, angulated above, and broadly, obliquely channelled below. The outer lip is thin, well but flatly curved. It has a very deep, open sinus, which lies close up to the suture . Below this the lip-edge sweeps very far forward, and again retreats towards the point of the shell. The inner lip: a barely appreciable glaze lies on the body. The line of the lip is concave. The columella is fine, a good deal narrowed, and cut off in front by a long-drawn, twisted, rounded edge.

== Distribution ==
This species occurs in the Atlantic Ocean off Northeast Brazil.
