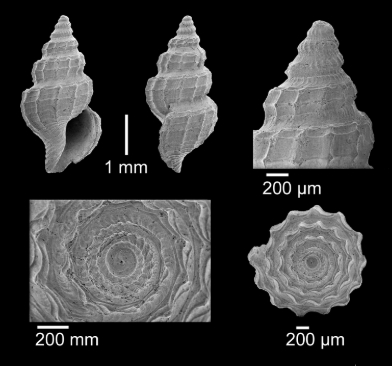
- Shel land protoconch of Pleurotomella vaginata (syntype at the Smithsonian Institution)

Scientific classification
- Kingdom: Animalia
- Phylum: Mollusca
- Class: Gastropoda
- Subclass: Caenogastropoda
- Order: Neogastropoda
- Superfamily: Conoidea
- Family: Raphitomidae
- Genus: Pleurotomella
- Species: P. vaginata

Binomial name
- Pleurotomella vaginata Dall, 1927

= Pleurotomella vaginata =

Species of gastropod

Pleurotomella vaginata is a species of sea snail, a marine gastropod mollusk in the family Raphitomidae.

== Description ==
The length of the shell attains 5.3 mm.

== Distribution ==
This marine species occurs off Georgia and Florida, USA at a depth of 805 m.
