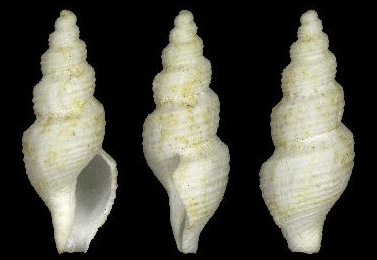
- Shell of Pleurotomella striatulata (syntype at MNHN, parsi)

Scientific classification
- Kingdom: Animalia
- Phylum: Mollusca
- Class: Gastropoda
- Subclass: Caenogastropoda
- Order: Neogastropoda
- Superfamily: Conoidea
- Family: Raphitomidae
- Genus: Pleurotomella
- Species: †P. striatulata

Binomial name
- †Pleurotomella striatulata Lamarck, 1822

= Pleurotomella striatulata =

Extinct species of gastropod

Pleurotomella striatulata is an extinct species of sea snail, a marine gastropod mollusk in the family Raphitomidae.

== Distribution ==
Fossils of this marine species were found in Miocene strata in Aquitaine, France
