= Pleurotomella imitator =

Scientific classification
- Kingdom: Animalia
- Phylum: Mollusca
- Class: Gastropoda
- Subclass: Caenogastropoda
- Order: Neogastropoda
- Superfamily: Conoidea
- Family: Raphitomidae
- Genus: Pleurotomella
- Species: P. imitator

Binomial name
- Pleurotomella imitator (W. H. Dall, 1927)

Synonyms
- Gymnobela imitator Dall, 1927

Species of gastropod

Pleurotomella imitator is a species of sea snail, a marine gastropod mollusk in the family Raphitomidae.

== Description ==
The length of the shell attains 3 mm, its diameter 1.5 mm.

(Original description) The minute, white shell has a sinusigera protoconch consisting of 2½ whorls and followed by nearly four subsequent whorl. The suture is distinct and appressed. The whorls are only moderately convex. The axial sculpture consists of (on the body whorl about 14) narrow, oblique ribs with wider interspaces, crossing the whorls, stronger on the earlier whorls, and ending in small close beadlike pustules in front of the suture. These ribs become obsolete on the base. The spiral sculpture consists of a single carina near the periphery of the whorls, prominent where it intersects the ribs, and 10 or 12 fine threads in front of the carina which slightly cut the ribs in crossing them. The anal fasciole is wide, extending from the carina to the coronation of the suture. The base is moderately convex. The columella is short, smooth and obliquely truncate. The outer lip is thin and sharp. The siphonal canal is wide and short.

== Distribution ==
This species occurs in the Atlantic Ocean off Georgia, USA.
