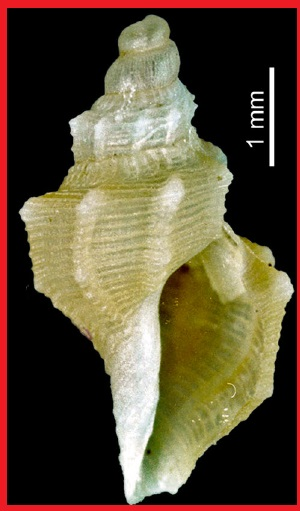

Scientific classification
- Kingdom: Animalia
- Phylum: Mollusca
- Class: Gastropoda
- Subclass: Caenogastropoda
- Order: Neogastropoda
- Superfamily: Conoidea
- Family: Raphitomidae
- Genus: Pleurotomella
- Species: P. enderbyensis

Binomial name
- Pleurotomella enderbyensis Powell, 1958

Synonyms
- Pleurotomella (Anomalotomella) enderbyensis Powell, 1958

= Pleurotomella enderbyensis =

Species of gastropod

Pleurotomella enderbyensis is a species of sea snail, a marine gastropod mollusk in the family Raphitomidae.

== Description ==
The shell grows to a length of 12 millimetres (0.47 in).

== Distribution ==
This species occurs in the Antarctic waters in the Weddell Sea.
