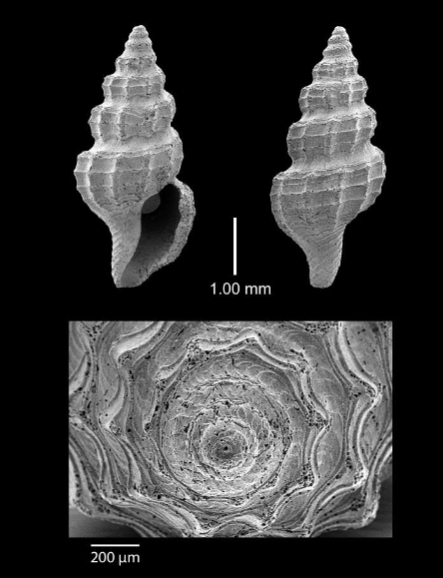
- Shell and protoconch of Pleurotomella corrida (syntype at the Smithsonian Institution)

Scientific classification
- Kingdom: Animalia
- Phylum: Mollusca
- Class: Gastropoda
- Subclass: Caenogastropoda
- Order: Neogastropoda
- Superfamily: Conoidea
- Family: Raphitomidae
- Genus: Pleurotomella
- Species: P. corrida

Binomial name
- Pleurotomella corrida Dall, 1927

= Pleurotomella corrida =

Species of sea snail

Pleurotomella corrida is a species of smallsea snail, a marine gastropod mollusk in the family Raphitomidae.

== Description ==
The length of the shell attains 4.7 mm.

== Distribution ==
This marine species is found off the coast of Georgia to Florida, USA.
