= Pleurotomella esmeralda =

Scientific classification
- Kingdom: Animalia
- Phylum: Mollusca
- Class: Gastropoda
- Subclass: Caenogastropoda
- Order: Neogastropoda
- Superfamily: Conoidea
- Family: Raphitomidae
- Genus: Pleurotomella
- Species: †P. esmeralda

Binomial name
- †Pleurotomella esmeralda Olsson, 1964

Extinct species of gastropod

Pleurotomella esmeralda is an extinct species of sea snail, a marine gastropod mollusk in the family Raphitomidae.

== Distribution ==
Fossils of this marine species were found in Pliocene strata in Ecuador; age range: 5.332 to 3.6 Ma.
