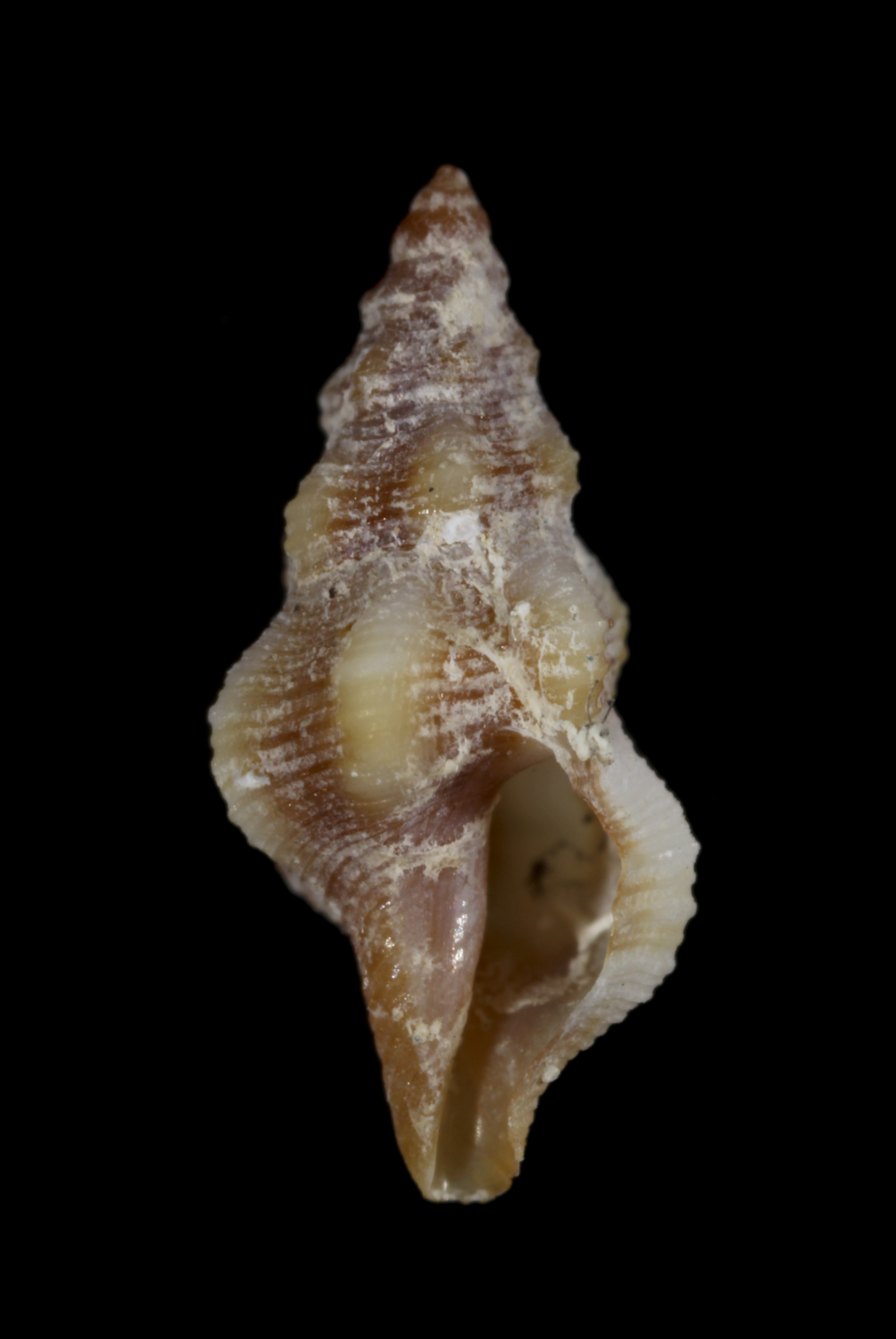
- Shell of Pleurotomella buccinoides (specimen at MNHN, Paris)

Scientific classification
- Kingdom: Animalia
- Phylum: Mollusca
- Class: Gastropoda
- Subclass: Caenogastropoda
- Order: Neogastropoda
- Superfamily: Conoidea
- Family: Raphitomidae
- Genus: Pleurotomella
- Species: P. buccinoides

Binomial name
- Pleurotomella buccinoides (Shuto, 1983)

Synonyms
- Tritonoturris buccinoides Shuto, 1983 (original combination)

= Pleurotomella buccinoides =

Species of gastropod

Pleurotomella buccinoides is a species of sea snail, a marine gastropod mollusk in the family Raphitomidae.

== Distribution ==
This marine species is endemic to Australia and occurs off New South Wales.
