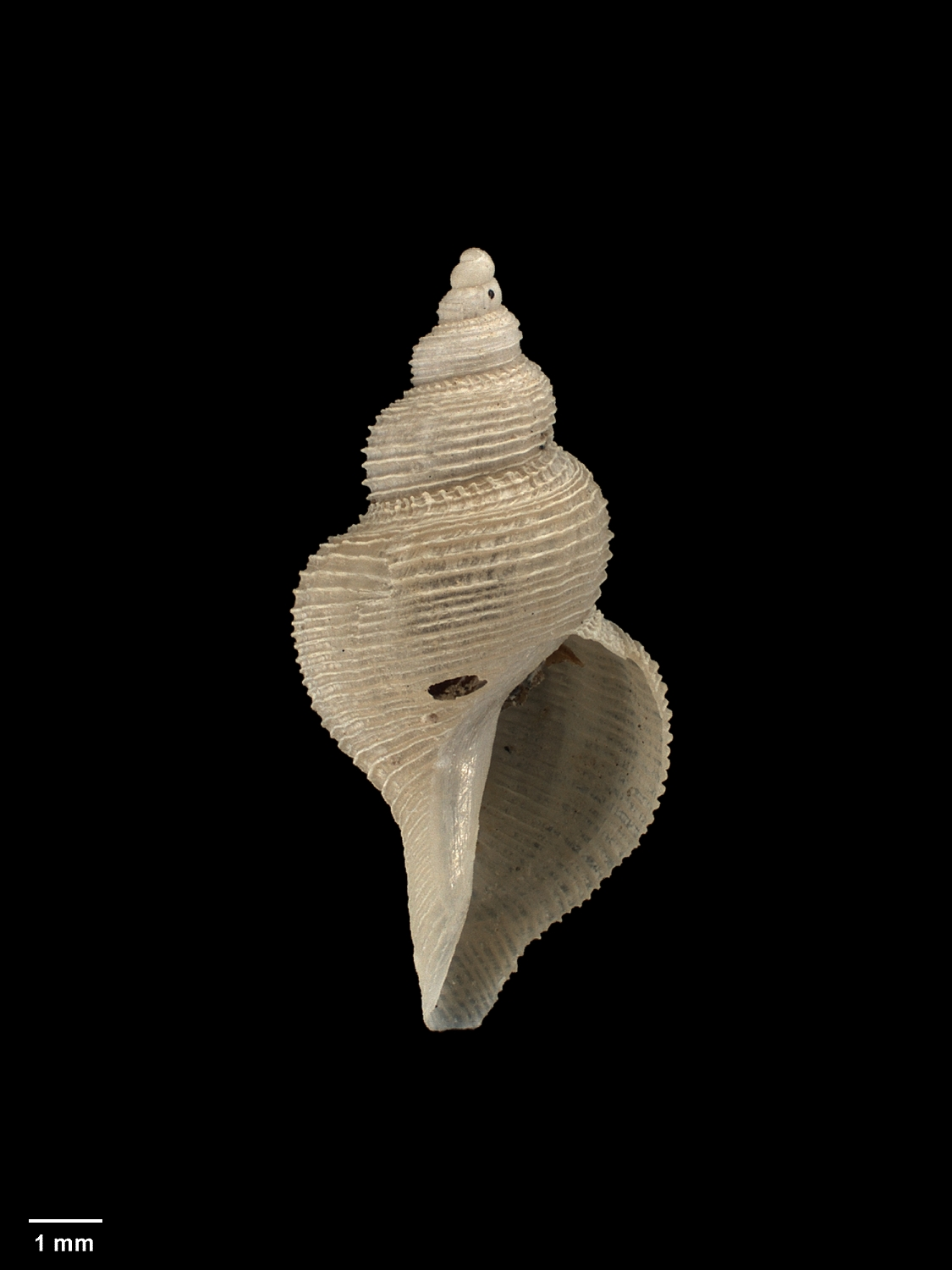
- Holotype

Scientific classification
- Kingdom: Animalia
- Phylum: Mollusca
- Class: Gastropoda
- Subclass: Caenogastropoda
- Order: Neogastropoda
- Superfamily: Conoidea
- Family: Raphitomidae
- Genus: Pleurotomella
- Species: P. endeavourensis

Binomial name
- Pleurotomella endeavourensis Dell, 1990

Synonyms
- Pleurotomella (Anomalotomella) endeavourensis Dell, 1990

= Pleurotomella endeavourensis =

Species of gastropod

Pleurotomella endeavourensis is a species of sea snail, a marine gastropod mollusk in the family Raphitomidae.

== Description ==
The length of the shell attains 10.9 mm.

== Distribution ==
This species occurs in the Ross Sea, Antarctica.
