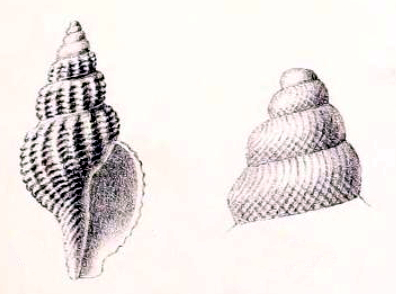
- Original image of shell (and protoconch) of Pleurotomella marshalli

Scientific classification
- Kingdom: Animalia
- Phylum: Mollusca
- Class: Gastropoda
- Subclass: Caenogastropoda
- Order: Neogastropoda
- Superfamily: Conoidea
- Family: Raphitomidae
- Genus: Pleurotomella
- Species: P. marshalli

Binomial name
- Pleurotomella marshalli (Sykes, 1906)

Synonyms
- Clathurella marshalli Sykes, 1906

= Pleurotomella marshalli =

Species of gastropod

Pleurotomella marshalli is a species of sea snail, a marine gastropod mollusk in the family Raphitomidae.

== Description ==
The length of the shell attains 4.5 mm, its diameter 1.8 mm

(Original description) The elongate-fusiform shell is fairly solid. The spire is well drawn out. The colour (dead specimen ) is whitish-brown. The shell contains 7½ convex, regularly increasing whorls. The protoconch is pointed, well exserted, of about 3½ whorls, worn and polished but bearing traces of the regular "Clathurella-sculpture". The consequent whorls bear rounded longitudinal riblets of fair size, crossed by a number of spiral threads (about 6 on the penultimate whorl), and showing traces of a smoother area below the suture. The aperture is of fair size, with a short, slightly recurved, siphonal canal.

== Distribution ==
This marine species occurs off Portugal.
