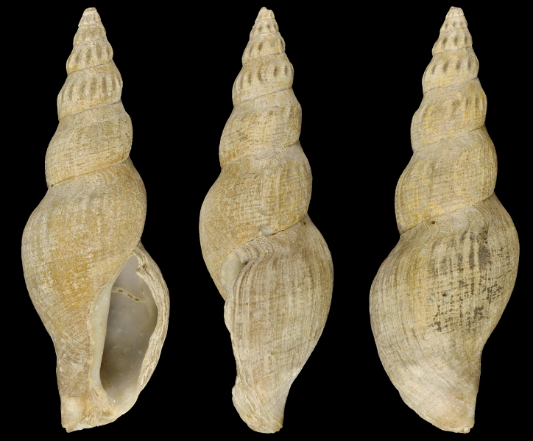
- Shell of Pleurotomella pandionis (holotype at the Smithsonian Institution)

Scientific classification
- Kingdom: Animalia
- Phylum: Mollusca
- Class: Gastropoda
- Subclass: Caenogastropoda
- Order: Neogastropoda
- Superfamily: Conoidea
- Family: Raphitomidae
- Genus: Pleurotomella
- Species: P. pandionis

Binomial name
- Pleurotomella pandionis A. E. Verrill, 1880

Synonyms
- Pleurotoma (Pleurotomella) pandionis Verrill, 1880 (original combination)

= Pleurotomella pandionis =

Species of sea snail

Pleurotomella pandionis is a species of sea snail, a marine gastropod mollusk in the family Raphitomidae.

== Description ==
The length of the shell attains 43 mm.

(Original description) The large, thick shell is dull brownish yellow, with a very acute, elevated spire. It contains nine whorls, very oblique, moderately convex, concave below the suture. The whole surface is covered with close lines of growth, which recede in a broad curve on the subsutural band. Numerous fine, unequal, raised, spiral lines cover the whole surface, except the subsutural band. The upper whorls are also crossed by sixteen to eighteen blunt, transverse ribs, about as broad as their interspaces, most elevated on the middle of the whorls, fading out above and below. The aperture is elongated and narrow. The sinus is broad and well marked, just below the suture. The siphonal canal is short and nearly straight. The operculum is absent.

== Distribution ==
P. pandionis can be found off the North American coastline, ranging from New Jersey south to Florida.
