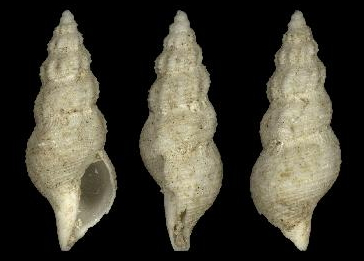
- Shell of † Pleurotomella verticicostata (holotype at MNHN, Paris)

Scientific classification
- Kingdom: Animalia
- Phylum: Mollusca
- Class: Gastropoda
- Subclass: Caenogastropoda
- Order: Neogastropoda
- Superfamily: Conoidea
- Family: Raphitomidae
- Genus: Pleurotomella
- Species: †P. verticicostata

Binomial name
- †Pleurotomella verticicostata Brébion, 1992

= Pleurotomella verticicostata =

Extinct species of gastropod

Pleurotomella verticicostata is an extinct species of sea snail, a marine gastropod mollusk in the family Raphitomidae.

== Distribution ==
Fossils of this marine species were found in Eocene strata in Île-de-France, France
