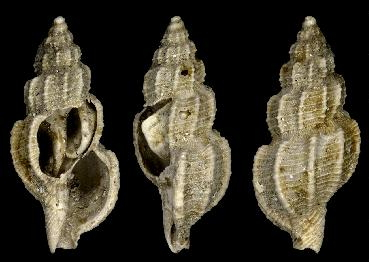
- Original image of a shell of Pleurotomella orthocolpa

Scientific classification
- Kingdom: Animalia
- Phylum: Mollusca
- Class: Gastropoda
- Subclass: Caenogastropoda
- Order: Neogastropoda
- Superfamily: Conoidea
- Family: Raphitomidae
- Genus: Pleurotomella
- Species: †P. orthocolpa

Binomial name
- †Pleurotomella orthocolpa Cossmann, 1902

= Pleurotomella orthocolpa =

Extinct species of gastropod

Pleurotomella orthocolpa is an extinct species of sea snail, a marine gastropod mollusk in the family Raphitomidae.

== Distribution ==
Fossils of this marine species were found in Eocene strata of Loire-Atlantique, France.
