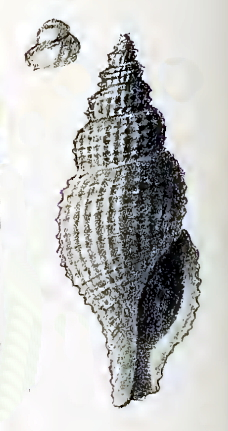
- Original image of a shell (and the protoconch) of Pleurotomella borbonica

Scientific classification
- Kingdom: Animalia
- Phylum: Mollusca
- Class: Gastropoda
- Subclass: Caenogastropoda
- Order: Neogastropoda
- Superfamily: Conoidea
- Family: Raphitomidae
- Genus: Pleurotomella
- Species: P. borbonica

Binomial name
- Pleurotomella borbonica J.C. Melvill, 1923

= Pleurotomella borbonica =

Species of gastropod

Pleurotomella borbonica is a species of sea snail, a marine gastropod mollusk in the family Raphitomidae.

== Description ==
The length of the shell attains 8 mm, its diameter 3 mm.

(Original description) This delicate, small shell has an elegantly fusiform shape. It is rather narrow, and gradually attenuate upwards. Its color is white, semidiaphanous. The shell contains 7-8 whorls 7-8. The whorls of the protoconch are smooth, white, and globose. The third whorl is elegantly but microscopically decussate. The remainder are angled a little below the sutures, delicately semitransparent, regularly cancellate. The interstices are quadrate. The longitudinal ribs of the body whorl are slightly oblique. The aperture is oblong. The outer lip is incrassate. The sinus is well defined, broad but very shallow. The columellar margin is fairly straight. The siphonal canal is short and a little recurved.

== Distribution ==
This marine species occurs in the Indian Ocean off Réunion
