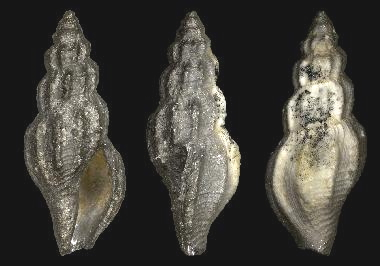
- Original image of a shell of †Pleurotomella quoniamensis

Scientific classification
- Kingdom: Animalia
- Phylum: Mollusca
- Class: Gastropoda
- Subclass: Caenogastropoda
- Order: Neogastropoda
- Superfamily: Conoidea
- Family: Raphitomidae
- Genus: Pleurotomella
- Species: †P. quoniamensis

Binomial name
- †Pleurotomella quoniamensis (Boussac in Périer, 1941)

Synonyms
- Pleurotomella (Systenope) quoniamensis (Boussac in Périer, 1941); Raphitoma quoniamensis Boussac in Périer, 1941 (original combination)

= Pleurotomella quoniamensis =

Extinct species of gastropod

Pleurotomella quoniamensis is an extinct species of sea snail, a marine gastropod mollusk in the family Raphitomidae.

== Distribution ==
Fossils of this marine species were found in Eocene strata in Île-de-France, France
