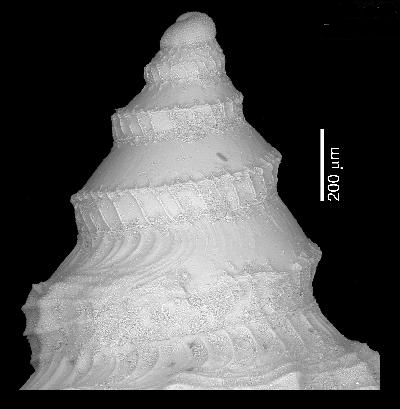
- Whorls of the shell of Pleurotomella protocarinata (holotype in MNHN, Paris)

Scientific classification
- Kingdom: Animalia
- Phylum: Mollusca
- Class: Gastropoda
- Subclass: Caenogastropoda
- Order: Neogastropoda
- Superfamily: Conoidea
- Family: Raphitomidae
- Genus: Pleurotomella
- Species: †P. protocarinata

Binomial name
- †Pleurotomella protocarinata Lozouet, 2017

= Pleurotomella protocarinata =

Extinct species of gastropod

Pleurotomella protocarinata is an extinct species of sea snail, a marine gastropod mollusk in the family Raphitomidae.

== Distribution ==
Fossils of this marine species were found in Oligocene strata in Aquitaine, France.
