= Pleurotomella cuspidata =

Scientific classification
- Kingdom: Animalia
- Phylum: Mollusca
- Class: Gastropoda
- Subclass: Caenogastropoda
- Order: Neogastropoda
- Superfamily: Conoidea
- Family: Raphitomidae
- Genus: Pleurotomella
- Species: †P. cuspidata

Binomial name
- †Pleurotomella cuspidata (Chapple, 1934)

Synonyms
- † Guraleus cuspidatus Chapple, 1934 (original combination)

Extinct species of gastropod

Pleurotomella cuspidata is an extinct species of sea snail, a marine gastropod mollusk in the family Raphitomidae.

== Distribution ==
Fossils of this marine species were found off Victoria, Australia.
