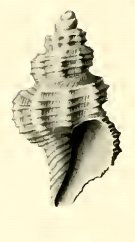
- Original image of a shell of Pleurotomella amplecta

Scientific classification
- Kingdom: Animalia
- Phylum: Mollusca
- Class: Gastropoda
- Subclass: Caenogastropoda
- Order: Neogastropoda
- Superfamily: Conoidea
- Family: Raphitomidae
- Genus: Pleurotomella
- Species: P. amplecta

Binomial name
- Pleurotomella amplecta Hedley, 1922

Synonyms
- Asperdaphne amplecta Hedley, 1922 (original combination); Clathurella amabilis Brazier, 1876; Clavatula amabilis Hinds, 1843; Favriella amplecta C.-K. Chang, 2001; Pleurotoma amabilis Reeve, 1846; Tasmadaphne aculeola (Hedley, 1915)

= Pleurotomella amplecta =

Species of gastropod

Pleurotomella amplecta is a species of sea snail, a marine gastropod mollusk in the family Raphitomidae.

== Description ==
The length of the shell attains 12 mm, its diameter 5 mm.

(Original description) The shell is fusiform. It contains nine whorls, including the protoconch. Its colour is dull white. The protoconch consists of two rounded microscopically spirally grooved whorls.

Sculpture: On the first adult whorl there are nine or ten radials, which decrease to six on the lower whorls. These are discontinuous, prominent, vertical, ceasing at the fasciole and on the base. The spirals are evenly spaced, sharp, elevated, overriding and denticulating the ribs, increasing by intercalation from two above to about eighteen below. These are again traversed by a secondary sculpture of fine radiating threads. The fasciole is broad, excavate, crossed by close, sharp, and crescentic lamella. The aperture is imperfect in the holotype. The siphonal canal is slightly twisted.

== Distribution ==
This marine species is endemic to Australia and occurs off New South Wales.
