= Pleurotomella ohlini =

Scientific classification
- Kingdom: Animalia
- Phylum: Mollusca
- Class: Gastropoda
- Subclass: Caenogastropoda
- Order: Neogastropoda
- Superfamily: Conoidea
- Family: Raphitomidae
- Genus: Pleurotomella
- Species: P. ohlini

Binomial name
- Pleurotomella ohlini (Strebel, 1905)

Synonyms
- Thesbia michaelseni (Strebel, 1905); Thesbia ohlini Strebel, 1905

Species of gastropod

Pleurotomella ohlini is a species of sea snail, a marine gastropod mollusk in the family Raphitomidae.

== Description ==
The length of the shell attains 10 mm.

== Distribution ==
This marine species occurs off Argentina, the Falklands and Tierra del Fuego.
