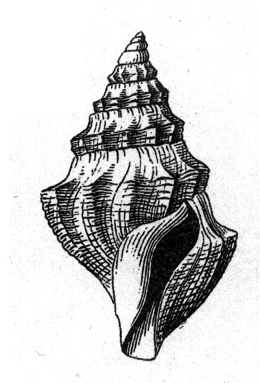
- Original image of a shell of Pleurotomella ipara

Scientific classification
- Kingdom: Animalia
- Phylum: Mollusca
- Class: Gastropoda
- Subclass: Caenogastropoda
- Order: Neogastropoda
- Superfamily: Conoidea
- Family: Raphitomidae
- Genus: Pleurotomella
- Species: P. ipara

Binomial name
- Pleurotomella ipara (Dall, 1881)

Synonyms
- Pleurotoma (Mangilia ?) ipara Dall, 1881 (original combination)

= Pleurotomella ipara =

Species of gastropod

Pleurotomella ipara is a species of sea snail, a marine gastropod mollusk in the family Raphitomidae.

== Description ==
The length of the shell attains 8.5 mm, its diameter 4.5 mm.

(Original description) The shell contains nine whorls. The protoconch is minute, dark brown, polished and smooth. The second and third whorls of the protoconch are beautifully reticulated by oblique transverse lines in two directions. The remainder are waxy white, with the peculiar waxy lustre of abyssal shells. The shell is rather short-fusiform, the spire subturreted by the concave ante-sutural band. The spiral sculpture consists of about twenty-four flattened threads, with wider interspaces, before the band on the body whorl. Only two or three of these threads are visible on the upper whorls. They pass over all the transverse ridges and are a little stronger over them. Next the suture are small, short, appressed plications, with a tendency to pair, and even to unite above, thus becoming staple-shaped. The ante-sutural band is excavated, smooth except for the terminations of the plicae, which cease near its posterior border. Near the anterior border the spiral threads begin, crossing sharply-projecting short oblique plications (thirteen on the body whorl) which disappear halfway from the perii) hery to the anterior end of the siphonal canal, and are somewhat angulated just in advance of the ante-sutural band. The notch is broad and deep. The outer lip is thin and projecting. The columella is short, thin and twisted. The siphonal canal is short and broad.

== Distribution ==
P. ipara can be found in Caribbean waters, ranging from the coast of Louisiana south to Brazil.
