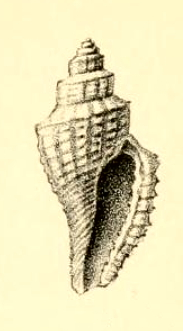
- Original image of a shell of Pleurotomella ecphora

Scientific classification
- Kingdom: Animalia
- Phylum: Mollusca
- Class: Gastropoda
- Subclass: Caenogastropoda
- Order: Neogastropoda
- Superfamily: Conoidea
- Family: Raphitomidae
- Genus: Pleurotomella
- Species: P. ecphora

Binomial name
- Pleurotomella ecphora (Melvill, 1904)

Synonyms
- Mangilia ecphora Melvill, 1904

= Pleurotomella ecphora =

Species of gastropod

Pleurotomella ecphora is a species of sea snail, a marine gastropod mollusk in the family Raphitomidae.

== Description ==
The length of the shell attains 5 mm, its diameter 2 mm.

The small, white shell has an ovate-fusiform shape. It is very elegant in form, fusoid towards the base. The shell contains six whorls. The three whorls of the protoconch are seen with a lens to be very finely cancellate. The species is remarkable for its acutely angled ridge surmounting the upper portion of the whorls of the spire. The longitudinal ribs (14 on the body whorl) and spiral lirae are extremely pronounced, the interstices being squarely and deeply cut. The siphonal canal is wide and open. The aperture is oblong. The outer lip is incrassate. The sinus is wide but not deep. The columella is rather straight.

== Distribution ==
This marine species occurs in the Persian Gulf and the Gulf of Oman.
