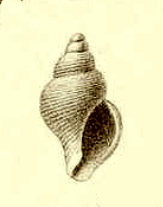
- Original image of a shell of Pleurotomella frigida

Scientific classification
- Kingdom: Animalia
- Phylum: Mollusca
- Class: Gastropoda
- Subclass: Caenogastropoda
- Order: Neogastropoda
- Superfamily: Conoidea
- Family: Raphitomidae
- Genus: Pleurotomella
- Species: P. frigida

Binomial name
- Pleurotomella frigida Thiele, 1912

Synonyms
- Pleurotomella (Anomalotomella) frigida Thiele, 1912

= Pleurotomella frigida =

Species of gastropod

Pleurotomella frigida is a species of sea snail, a marine gastropod mollusk in the family Raphitomidae. This species was first described by Johannes Thiele in 1912.

== Description ==
The shell of Pleurotomella frigida is relatively small, with a length that varies between 5.2 mm and 11 mm. The shell is characterized by its elongated, fusiform shape and intricate patterns. The coloration of the shell can vary, but it typically features a combination of light and dark hues that provide camouflage against the seabed. The surface of the shell is adorned with fine spiral ridges and grooves, which add to its intricate appearance. The aperture is narrow, and the outer lip is thin and slightly flared.

== Distribution ==
This marine species occurs in the Davis Sea and the Weddell Sea, Antarctica. The species inhabits deep-water environments, typically at depths ranging from 200 to 600 meters.
