= Pleurotomella sansibarica =

Scientific classification
- Kingdom: Animalia
- Phylum: Mollusca
- Class: Gastropoda
- Subclass: Caenogastropoda
- Order: Neogastropoda
- Superfamily: Conoidea
- Family: Raphitomidae
- Genus: Pleurotomella
- Species: P. sansibarica

Binomial name
- Pleurotomella sansibarica Thiele, 1925

Species of gastropod

Pleurotomella sansibarica is a species of sea snail, a marine gastropod mollusk in the family Raphitomidae.

== Distribution ==
This marine species occurs in the Zanzibar Channel.
