= Pleurotomella elisa =

Scientific classification
- Kingdom: Animalia
- Phylum: Mollusca
- Class: Gastropoda
- Subclass: Caenogastropoda
- Order: Neogastropoda
- Superfamily: Conoidea
- Family: Raphitomidae
- Genus: Pleurotomella
- Species: P. elisa

Binomial name
- Pleurotomella elisa Thiele, 1925

Species of gastropod

Pleurotomella elisa is a species of sea snail, a marine gastropod mollusk in the family Raphitomidae., order Neogastropoda, and Class Turridae.

== Distribution ==
This marine species occurs off the Agulhas Bank, South Africa
