= Pleurotomella polycolpa =

Scientific classification
- Kingdom: Animalia
- Phylum: Mollusca
- Class: Gastropoda
- Subclass: Caenogastropoda
- Order: Neogastropoda
- Superfamily: Conoidea
- Family: Raphitomidae
- Genus: Pleurotomella
- Species: †P. polycolpa

Binomial name
- †Pleurotomella polycolpa (Cossmann, 1889)

Extinct species of gastropod

Pleurotomella polycolpa is an extinct species of sea snail, a marine gastropod mollusk in the family Raphitomidae.

== Distribution ==
Fossils of this marine species were found in Eocene strata of Île-de-France, France.
