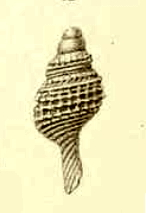
- Original image of a shell of Pleurotomella deliciosa

Scientific classification
- Kingdom: Animalia
- Phylum: Mollusca
- Class: Gastropoda
- Subclass: Caenogastropoda
- Order: Neogastropoda
- Superfamily: Conoidea
- Family: Raphitomidae
- Genus: Pleurotomella
- Species: P. deliciosa

Binomial name
- Pleurotomella deliciosa Thiele, 1912

Synonyms
- Pleurotomella (Anomalotomella) deliciosa Thiele, 1912; Typhlodaphne deliciosa Egorova 1982

= Pleurotomella deliciosa =

Species of gastropod

Pleurotomella deliciosa is a species of sea snail, a marine gastropod mollusk in the family Raphitomidae.

== Description ==
The length of the shell attains 4 mm.

== Distribution ==
This marine species occurs in the Davis Sea and the Weddell Sea, and Ross Sea, Antarctica.
