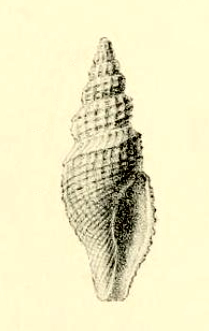
- Original image of a shell of Pleurotomella eulimenes

Scientific classification
- Kingdom: Animalia
- Phylum: Mollusca
- Class: Gastropoda
- Subclass: Caenogastropoda
- Order: Neogastropoda
- Superfamily: Conoidea
- Family: Raphitomidae
- Genus: Pleurotomella
- Species: P. eulimenes

Binomial name
- Pleurotomella eulimenes (Melvill, 1904)

Synonyms
- Daphnella eulimenes Melvill, 1906

= Pleurotomella eulimenes =

Species of gastropod

Pleurotomella eulimenes is a species of sea snail, a marine gastropod mollusk in the family Raphitomidae.

== Description ==
The length of the shell attains 6 mm, its diameter is 2 mm.

== Distribution ==
This marine species occurs in the Gulf of Oman.
