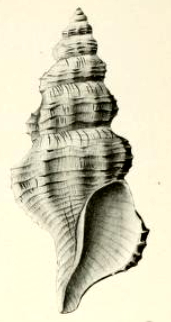
- Original image of a shell of Pleurotomella aculeola

Scientific classification
- Kingdom: Animalia
- Phylum: Mollusca
- Class: Gastropoda
- Subclass: Caenogastropoda
- Order: Neogastropoda
- Superfamily: Conoidea
- Family: Raphitomidae
- Genus: Pleurotomella
- Species: P. aculeola

Binomial name
- Pleurotomella aculeola (Hedley, 1915)

Synonyms
- Daphnella aculeola Hedley, 1915; Tasmadaphne aculeola (Hedley, 1915)

= Pleurotomella aculeola =

Species of gastropod

Pleurotomella aculeola is a species of sea snail, a marine gastropod mollusk in the family Raphitomidae.

== Description ==
The length of the shell attains 8.5 mm, its diameter 4 mm.

(Original description) The small shell is lanceolate-fusiform. Its colour is buff, stained with ferruginous at the extremities. The shell contains eight whorls, the first three minute, smooth, forming the protoconch, the rest sculptured, gradate and rapidly increasing in size.

Sculpture : broad peripheral undulations compose radial ribs spaced at ten to a whorl, fine spiral cords continue across both ribs and interstices and extend over the base. Of these, the body whorl carries sixteen and the penultimate six, those on the periphery increase in size and sharpen the projection of the ribs. The aperture is ovate,. The outer lip is thin, simple, with a slight smear of callus on the columella. The siphonal canal is short, straight and open.

== Distribution ==
This marine species is endemic to Australia and occurs off New South Wales.
