= Pleurotomella perpauxilla =

Scientific classification
- Kingdom: Animalia
- Phylum: Mollusca
- Class: Gastropoda
- Subclass: Caenogastropoda
- Order: Neogastropoda
- Superfamily: Conoidea
- Family: Raphitomidae
- Genus: Pleurotomella
- Species: P. perpauxilla

Binomial name
- Pleurotomella perpauxilla (Watson, 1881)

Synonyms
- Pleurotoma (Defrancia) perpauxilla Watson, 1881 (original combination)

Species of gastropod

Pleurotomella perpauxilla is a species of sea snail, a marine gastropod mollusk in the family Raphitomidae.

== Description ==
The length of the shell attains 3.8 mm.

(Original description) The white shell is very small, high and narrow, ribbed and spiralled. It has with convex whorls, a small elongated regular body, impressed suture, a high, conical, small-tipped spire, a rounded base, and a small, longish, triangular, one-sided aperture.

Sculpture: Longitudinals – there are on the latter whorls about 9 biggish flatly rounded ribs, parted by equally broad open rounded furrows. In the upper whorls they barely reach the lower suture. On the body whorl they hardly extend to the base. They originate at a shoulder below the sinus-area. They are thus very short. The lines of growth are very faint, except in the sinus-area, where, round the top o£ the whorls, the old sinus-scars form a series of short, sharp, regular, remote, little riblets. Spirals – below the sinus-area is a feeble thread. The periphery of the whorls is marked by two sharp, square-topped threads, which form a double keel. The upper one is very near the feeble thread above mentioned. The interval between the carinal threads is about four times their breadth. Somewhat more remote, a third thread, equally strong, appears on the body whorl, coming out exactly from the oral angle and defining the base. Above and below this, at about equal distances, are two feebler threads. The rest of the base is bare, but the entire aperture is covered with very small spiral threads. The entire surface is very minutely scored with microscopic spiral lines.

The colour of the shell is frosted white, with a buff protoconch.

Protoconch: there are four embryonic whorls, which form a high cone with a slightly impressed suture, and rise to a small rounded prominent tip. The sculpture is typical, the tip being scored with some 10 or 12-minute sharp spiral threads, while the other whorls have straight bars on the upper part and reticulated bars below, only the part occupied by the straight bars is exceptionally short.

The shell contains 7–8 whorls, of regular increase, with a drooping shoulder, a double carination, and a marked contraction to the inferior suture. The body whorl is very regular in form, with a slightly contracted base, from which projects a small triangular one-sided aperture. The suture is slightly impressed, flatly but minutely marginated below. The aperture is oval, angulated above, and prolonged into a rather broad and longish siphonal canal below. The outer lip is very regularly curved, but drawn out straight along the siphonal canal. Its edge, which is rather prominently curved below, forms a somewhat low shoulder above, between which and the body lies the wide-mouthed, deep, rounded sinus. The inner lip is rather broad and distinct .It is very early cut off on the short columella at the very oblique twisted edge, which then runs on as a thin sharp margin to the siphonal canal. The junction of the columella and body is rather deeply concave.

== Distribution ==
This marine species occurs off Puerto Rico
