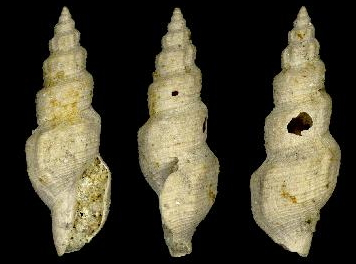
- Shells of Pleurotomella guespellensis

Scientific classification
- Kingdom: Animalia
- Phylum: Mollusca
- Class: Gastropoda
- Subclass: Caenogastropoda
- Order: Neogastropoda
- Superfamily: Conoidea
- Family: Raphitomidae
- Genus: Pleurotomella
- Species: †P. guespellensis

Binomial name
- †Pleurotomella guespellensis (Cossmann, 1889)

Synonyms
- † Pleurotomella (Systenope) guespellensis (Cossmann, 1889)

= Pleurotomella guespellensis =

Extinct species of gastropod

Pleurotomella guespellensis is an extinct species of sea snail, a marine gastropod mollusk in the family Raphitomidae.

== Distribution ==
Fossils of this marine species were found in Eocene strata of Île-de-France, France.
