= Pleurotomella gibbera =

Scientific classification
- Kingdom: Animalia
- Phylum: Mollusca
- Class: Gastropoda
- Subclass: Caenogastropoda
- Order: Neogastropoda
- Superfamily: Conoidea
- Family: Raphitomidae
- Genus: Pleurotomella
- Species: P. gibbera

Binomial name
- Pleurotomella gibbera Bouchet & Warén, 1980

Species of gastropod

Pleurotomella gibbera is a species of sea snail, a marine gastropod mollusk in the family Raphitomidae.

== Description ==
The length of the shell attains 5 mm.

== Distribution ==
This marine species occurs off Madeira and also in the central and western Mediterranean Sea.
