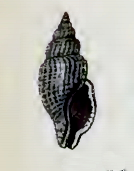
- Original image of a shell of Pleurotomella hayesiana

Scientific classification
- Kingdom: Animalia
- Phylum: Mollusca
- Class: Gastropoda
- Subclass: Caenogastropoda
- Order: Neogastropoda
- Superfamily: Conoidea
- Family: Raphitomidae
- Genus: Pleurotomella
- Species: P. hayesiana

Binomial name
- Pleurotomella hayesiana (Angas, 1871)

Synonyms
- Asperdaphne hayesiana (Angas, 1871); Clathurella hayesiana Angas, 1871 (original combination)

= Pleurotomella hayesiana =

Species of gastropod

Pleurotomella hayesiana is a species of sea snail, a marine gastropod mollusk in the family Raphitomidae.

== Description ==
The length of the shell attains 18 mm.

(Original description) The rather solid shell has an ovately fusiform shape. It is of a dull chalky-grey colour. The shell contains 7 whorls, angulated at the upper part, closely longitudinally ribbed and transversely ridged, forming flattened nodules at the points of intersection. The spire is sharp. The apex is purple. The aperture is elongately ovate, deep purple within. The outer lip is finely denticulated at the edge, contracted below. The posterior sinus is narrow and rather deep.

== Distribution ==
This marine species is endemic to Australia and occurs off New South Wales at depths between 4 m and 27 m.
