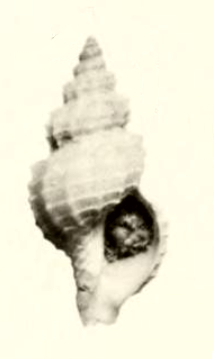
- Original image of a shell of Pleurotomella eurybrocha

Scientific classification
- Kingdom: Animalia
- Phylum: Mollusca
- Class: Gastropoda
- Subclass: Caenogastropoda
- Order: Neogastropoda
- Superfamily: Conoidea
- Family: Raphitomidae
- Genus: Pleurotomella
- Species: P. eurybrocha

Binomial name
- Pleurotomella eurybrocha (Dautzenberg & Fischer, 1896)

Synonyms
- Defrancia implicisculpta Sturany, 1896; Pleurotoma eurybrocha Dautzenberg & Fischer, 1896

= Pleurotomella eurybrocha =

Species of gastropod

Pleurotomella eurybrocha is a species of sea snail, a marine gastropod mollusk in the family Raphitomidae.

== Description ==
The length of the shell attains 5.5 mm, its diameter 2.7 mm.

== Distribution ==
This marine species occurs off the Azores and Southern Spain.
