= Pleurotomella maitasi =

Scientific classification
- Kingdom: Animalia
- Phylum: Mollusca
- Class: Gastropoda
- Subclass: Caenogastropoda
- Order: Neogastropoda
- Superfamily: Conoidea
- Family: Raphitomidae
- Genus: Pleurotomella
- Species: P. maitasi

Binomial name
- Pleurotomella maitasi Engl, 2008

Synonyms
- Pleurotomella (Pleurotomella) maitasi Engl, 2008· accepted, alternate representation

Species of gastropod

Pleurotomella maitasi is a species of sea snail, a marine gastropod mollusk in the family Raphitomidae.

== Distribution ==
This marine species occurs in the Scotia Sea.
