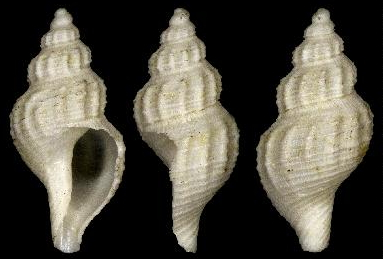
- Shell of † Pleurotomella fragilis, specimen at MNHN, Paris

Scientific classification
- Kingdom: Animalia
- Phylum: Mollusca
- Class: Gastropoda
- Subclass: Caenogastropoda
- Order: Neogastropoda
- Superfamily: Conoidea
- Family: Raphitomidae
- Genus: Pleurotomella
- Species: †P. fragilis

Binomial name
- †Pleurotomella fragilis (Deshayes, 1834)

= Pleurotomella fragilis =

Extinct species of gastropod

Pleurotomella fragilis is an extinct species of sea snail, a marine gastropod mollusk in the family Raphitomidae.

== Distribution ==
Fossils of this marine species were found in Eocene strata in Île-de-France, France.
