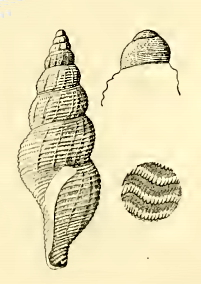
- Shell of Pleurotomella brenchleyi

Scientific classification
- Kingdom: Animalia
- Phylum: Mollusca
- Class: Gastropoda
- Subclass: Caenogastropoda
- Order: Neogastropoda
- Superfamily: Conoidea
- Family: Raphitomidae
- Genus: Pleurotomella
- Species: P. brenchleyi

Binomial name
- Pleurotomella brenchleyi (Angas, 1877)

Synonyms
- Asperdaphne brenchleyi (Angas, 1877); Clathurella brenchleyi Angas, 1877 (original combination); Daphnella brenchleyi (Angas, 1877)

= Pleurotomella brenchleyi =

Species of gastropod

Pleurotomella brenchleyi is a species of sea snail, a marine gastropod mollusk in the family Raphitomidae.

== Description ==
The length of the shell attains 19 mm.

(Original description) The fusiformly turreted shell is moderately solid. It is light brown inclining to ash-colour towards the apex. It contains eight whorls, slightly angulated at the upper part, and somewhat compressed next the sutures, longitudinally more or less prominently ribbed. The oblique ribs (14–15 on the penultimate whorl) are crossed with regular elevated ridges, which are less distinct below the sutures, from which descend very fine and close-set crescent-shaped striae (10–12 on the penultimate whorl) as far as the angle of the whorl, crossing the concentric lines. The spire is sharp. The apex is dark brown or purple. The aperture is elongately ovate, brown within. The outer lip is denticulated at the edge, crenate within, and margined with white. The posterior sinus is broad and shallow. The siphonal canal is short, wide and recurved. The columella is smooth.

The shell is moderately solid, light brown, inclining to ash-color towards the apex. The aperture is tinged with brown.

== Distribution ==
This marine species is endemic to Australia and occurs off New South Wales at depths between 12 mm and 100 m.
