= Pleurotomella neerrepenensis =

Scientific classification
- Kingdom: Animalia
- Phylum: Mollusca
- Class: Gastropoda
- Subclass: Caenogastropoda
- Order: Neogastropoda
- Superfamily: Conoidea
- Family: Raphitomidae
- Genus: Pleurotomella
- Species: †P. neerrepenensis

Binomial name
- †Pleurotomella neerrepenensis Marquet, Lenaerts & Laporte, 2016

Synonyms
- † Raphitoma neerrepenensis R. Marquet, Lenaerts & Laporte, 2016

Extinct species of gastropod

Pleurotomella neerrepenensis is an extinct species of sea snail, a marine gastropod mollusk in the family Raphitomidae.

== Distribution ==
Fossils of this marine species were found in Oligocene strata in Belgium.
