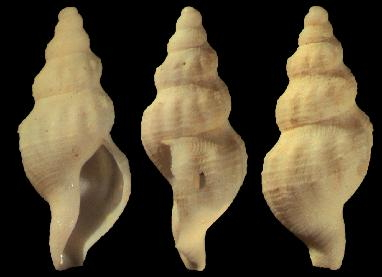
- Shells of Pleurotomella goniocolpa

Scientific classification
- Kingdom: Animalia
- Phylum: Mollusca
- Class: Gastropoda
- Subclass: Caenogastropoda
- Order: Neogastropoda
- Superfamily: Conoidea
- Family: Raphitomidae
- Genus: Pleurotomella
- Species: †P. goniocolpa

Binomial name
- †Pleurotomella goniocolpa (Cossmann, 1889)

Synonyms
- † Pleurotomella cossmanni Morellet & Morellet, 1946; † Pleurotomella (Systenope) goniocolpa (Cossmann, 1889)

= Pleurotomella goniocolpa =

Extinct species of gastropod

Pleurotomella goniocolpa is an extinct species of sea snail, a marine gastropod mollusk in the family Raphitomidae.

== Distribution ==
Fossils of this marine species were found in Eocene strata of Picardie, France.
