= Pleurotomella ursula =

Scientific classification
- Kingdom: Animalia
- Phylum: Mollusca
- Class: Gastropoda
- Subclass: Caenogastropoda
- Order: Neogastropoda
- Superfamily: Conoidea
- Family: Raphitomidae
- Genus: Pleurotomella
- Species: P. ursula

Binomial name
- Pleurotomella ursula Thiele, 1925

Species of gastropod

Pleurotomella ursula is a species of sea snail, a marine gastropod mollusk in the family Raphitomidae.

== Distribution ==
This marine species occurs off the Agulhas Bank, South Africa
