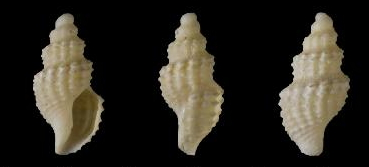
- Original image of a shell of Pleurotomella bezanconi

Scientific classification
- Kingdom: Animalia
- Phylum: Mollusca
- Class: Gastropoda
- Subclass: Caenogastropoda
- Order: Neogastropoda
- Superfamily: Conoidea
- Family: Raphitomidae
- Genus: Pleurotomella
- Species: †P. bezanconi

Binomial name
- †Pleurotomella bezanconi (Cossmann, 1902)

Synonyms
- † Peratotoma bezanconi Cossmann, 1902; † Pleurotomella (Anomalotomella) bezanconi (Cossmann, 1902)

= Pleurotomella bezanconi =

Extinct species of gastropod

Pleurotomella bezanconi is an extinct species of sea snail, a marine gastropod mollusk in the family Raphitomidae.

== Distribution ==
Fossils of this marine species were found in Eocene strata of Île-de-France, France.
