= Pleurotomella insignifica =

- Original image of a shell of †Pleurotomella insignifica

Scientific classification
- Kingdom: Animalia
- Phylum: Mollusca
- Class: Gastropoda
- Subclass: Caenogastropoda
- Order: Neogastropoda
- Superfamily: Conoidea
- Family: Raphitomidae
- Genus: Pleurotomella
- Species: †P. insignifica

Binomial name
- †Pleurotomella insignifica (Heilprin, 1879)

Synonyms
- Pleurotoma insignifa Heilprin, 1879

Extinct species of gastropod

Pleurotomella insignifica is an extinct species of sea snail, a marine gastropod mollusk in the family Raphitomidae.

== Description ==
(Original description) The fusiform shell shows prominent revolving lines below the middle of the whorl. The spire is elevated. The shell contains about five angular whorls. The siphonal canal is short, obliquely curved. The aperture is contracted.

== Distribution ==
Fossils of this marine species were found in Eocene strata in Alabama, USA.
