= Pleurotomella hadria =

Scientific classification
- Kingdom: Animalia
- Phylum: Mollusca
- Class: Gastropoda
- Subclass: Caenogastropoda
- Order: Neogastropoda
- Superfamily: Conoidea
- Family: Raphitomidae
- Genus: Pleurotomella
- Species: P. hadria

Binomial name
- Pleurotomella hadria (Dall, 1889)

Synonyms
- Mangilia hadria Dall, 1889

Species of gastropod

Pleurotomella hadria, common name the hadria turrid, is a species of sea snail, a marine gastropod mollusc in the family Raphitomidae.

== Description ==
The length of the shell attains 27 mm, its diameter 13 mm.

(Original description) The shell resembles Theta chariessa (R. B. Watson, 1881) in its general features, but is larger and stouter, and differing in details of sculpture, etc. It is best described by comparing it with the Theta chariessa. The protoconch is similar and there are seven subsequent whorls. The keel is less prominent, there is a narrow shallow groove behind it, and then two sharp threads marginating the fasciole, which are more distinct on the earlier whorls. The spiral threads on the fasciole are crossed by fine arched ripples, but in Pleurotmella hadria these ripples are more numerous, finer and closer together, they follow the incremental lines, and, as the sinus is less profound in P. hadria, they are less deeply concave. One of the most marked differences is a series of small oblique riblets, which begin in front of the fasciole or on the keel itself, especially on the earlier whorls, cutting its continuity, and continued obliquely in front of it nearly or quite to the suture as threads reticulating the spirals. This feature becomes obsolete on the body whorl or half-whorl, and is stronger in archibenthal specimens from the Gulf of Mexico than in those from off the Carolina coast. On the base of P. hadria the threads are hardly divisible into two series, and the alternations of size are very slight, and occur in every other thread if at all, instead of several fine ones intercalated between two primaries. The aperture, roundness of the base, outer lip, etc., are much as in P. catasarca, but the notch is not so deep, the columella is not quite so straight, and the siphonal canal is a little twisted and plainly somewhat recurved.

== Distribution ==
P. hadria can be found off the North American coastline, ranging from North Carolina to Alabama.
