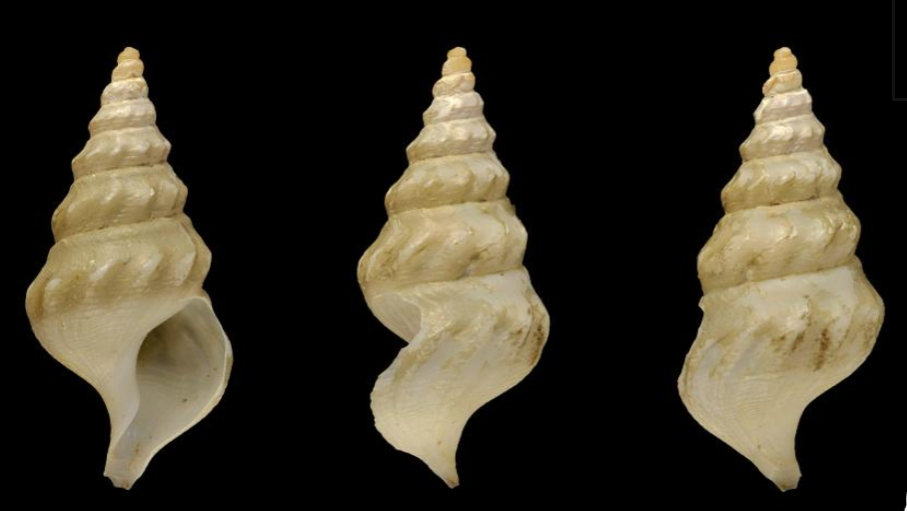
- Shell of Pleurotomella herminea (holotype at the Smithsonian Institution)

Scientific classification
- Kingdom: Animalia
- Phylum: Mollusca
- Class: Gastropoda
- Subclass: Caenogastropoda
- Order: Neogastropoda
- Superfamily: Conoidea
- Family: Raphitomidae
- Genus: Pleurotomella
- Species: P. herminea

Binomial name
- Pleurotomella herminea Dall, 1919

Synonyms
- Typhlomangelia herminea (Dall, 1919)

= Pleurotomella herminea =

Species of gastropod

Pleurotomella herminea is a species of sea snail, a marine gastropod mollusk in the family Raphitomidae.

== Description ==
The length of the shell attains 19 mm, its diameter 8 mm.

(Original description) The shell is of moderate size, gray with a brown apex. The protoconch is nucleus eroded. The shell contains eight whorls. The suture is distinct, preceded by an obscure thickened margin, not appressed. The whorls descend flatly from the suture to the shoulder. The axial sculpture consists of (on the body whorl 10 or 11) short, protractively oblique rounded ribs, extending on the spire from the shoulder to the succeeding suture, but on the body whorl not over the base. Obscure incremental lines arcuate on the anal fasciole. The spiral sculpture on the spire consists of three or more threads, with subeqiial interspaces, in the space between the periphery and the succeeding suture, and on the body whorl on the base about twenty flatter spirals with narrower interspaces. Most of the threads are swollen where they pass over the ribs. The aperture is wide and short. The anal fasciole is deep and rounded, not quite adjacent to the suture. The outer lip is thin, produced and sharp. The body is erased. The columella is short, gyrate, but the axis not pervious. The siphonal canal is distinct, short slightly recurved.

== Distribution ==
This marine species was found off Catalina Island, California, USA.
