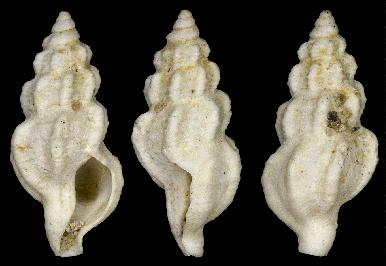
- Shell of † Pleurotomella granulatorappardi, specimen at MNHN, Paris

Scientific classification
- Kingdom: Animalia
- Phylum: Mollusca
- Class: Gastropoda
- Subclass: Caenogastropoda
- Order: Neogastropoda
- Superfamily: Conoidea
- Family: Raphitomidae
- Genus: Pleurotomella
- Species: †P. granulatorappardi

Binomial name
- †Pleurotomella granulatorappardi Janssen, 1979

= Pleurotomella granulatorappardi =

Extinct species of gastropod

Pleurotomella granulatorappardi is an extinct species of sea snail, a marine gastropod mollusk in the family Raphitomidae.

== Distribution ==
Fossils of this marine species were found in Oligocene strata in Aquitaine, France.
