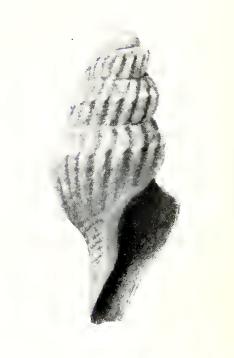
- Original image of a shell of Pleurotomella hermione

Scientific classification
- Kingdom: Animalia
- Phylum: Mollusca
- Class: Gastropoda
- Subclass: Caenogastropoda
- Order: Neogastropoda
- Superfamily: Conoidea
- Family: Raphitomidae
- Genus: Pleurotomella
- Species: P. hermione

Binomial name
- Pleurotomella hermione (Dall, 1919)

Synonyms
- Mangilia hermione Dall, 1919

= Pleurotomella hermione =

Species of gastropod

Pleurotomella hermione is a species of sea snail, a marine gastropod mollusk in the family Raphitomidae.

== Description ==
The length of the remaining whorls of the holotype is 8 mm, the diameter 4 mm.

(Original description) The small, white shell is decollate, but consists originally of five or more whorls exclusive of the protoconch. The first two remaining intact whorls (the first is eroded) are axial]y sculptured with about 20 close-set obliquely protractive rounded ribs cut by sharp grooves which make of the interspaces rounded nodules, the second row from the preceding suture being more prominent and forming a shoulder to the whorl. There are five of these rows on the spire, and the ribs they represent extend from suture to suture. On the later whorls they are less prominent, and on the last are obsolete except at the shoulder which is feeble. Other spiral sculpture on the body whorl is of fine equal threads with narrower interspaces, extending from the shoulder to the siphonal canal. The suture is distinct, not appressed. The whorls are well rounded. The aperture is rather narrow. The anal sulcus is wide and deep, its deepest part at the shoulder, with no subsutural callus. The outer lip is thin, sharp and prominently arcuately produced. The inner lip is erased. The columella is short, gyrate, axis not pervious. The siphonal canal is distinct, rather long and wide.

== Distribution ==
This marine species occurs off the Galapagos Islands.
