= Pleurotomella ybessa =

Scientific classification
- Kingdom: Animalia
- Phylum: Mollusca
- Class: Gastropoda
- Subclass: Caenogastropoda
- Order: Neogastropoda
- Superfamily: Conoidea
- Family: Raphitomidae
- Genus: Pleurotomella
- Species: P. ybessa

Binomial name
- Pleurotomella ybessa Figueira & Absalão, 2012

Species of gastropod

Pleurotomella ybessa is a species of sea snail, a marine gastropod mollusk in the family Raphitomidae.

== Distribution ==
This marine species occurs in the Campos Basin, Southeast Brazil.
