= Pleurotomella granuliapicata =

Scientific classification
- Kingdom: Animalia
- Phylum: Mollusca
- Class: Gastropoda
- Subclass: Caenogastropoda
- Order: Neogastropoda
- Superfamily: Conoidea
- Family: Raphitomidae
- Genus: Pleurotomella
- Species: P. granuliapicata

Binomial name
- Pleurotomella granuliapicata Okutani, 1964

Species of gastropod

Pleurotomella granuliapicata is a species of sea snail, a marine gastropod mollusk in the family Raphitomidae.

== Distribution ==
This marine species occurs off Japan.
