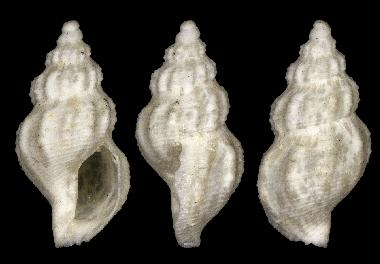
- Shell of Pleurotomella striarella (specimen at MNHN, Paris)

Scientific classification
- Kingdom: Animalia
- Phylum: Mollusca
- Class: Gastropoda
- Subclass: Caenogastropoda
- Order: Neogastropoda
- Superfamily: Conoidea
- Family: Raphitomidae
- Genus: Pleurotomella
- Species: †P. striarella

Binomial name
- †Pleurotomella striarella (Lamarck, 1804)

Synonyms
- Peratotoma fragilis (Deshayes, 1834); Pleurotomella (Anomalotomella) striarella (Lamarck, 1804)

= Pleurotomella striarella =

Extinct species of gastropod

Pleurotomella striarella is an extinct species of sea snail, a marine gastropod mollusk in the family Raphitomidae.

== Distribution ==
Fossils of this marine species were found in Eocene strata in Île-de-France, France
