= Pleurotomella minuta =

Scientific classification
- Kingdom: Animalia
- Phylum: Mollusca
- Class: Gastropoda
- Subclass: Caenogastropoda
- Order: Neogastropoda
- Superfamily: Conoidea
- Family: Raphitomidae
- Genus: Pleurotomella
- Species: P. minuta

Binomial name
- Pleurotomella minuta Sysoev & Ivanov, 1985

Synonyms
- Pleurotomella (Anomalotomella) minuta Sysoev & Ivanov, 1985

Species of gastropod

Pleurotomella minuta is a species of sea snail, a marine gastropod mollusk in the family Raphitomidae.

== Distribution ==
This marine species was found on the Naska Ridge, Southeast Pacific
