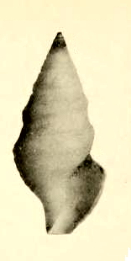
- Original image of a shell of Pleurotomella anceyi

Scientific classification
- Kingdom: Animalia
- Phylum: Mollusca
- Class: Gastropoda
- Subclass: Caenogastropoda
- Order: Neogastropoda
- Superfamily: Conoidea
- Family: Raphitomidae
- Genus: Pleurotomella
- Species: P. anceyi

Binomial name
- Pleurotomella anceyi (Dautzenberg & Fischer, 1897)

Synonyms
- Pleurotoma anceyi Dautzenberg & Fischer, 1897(original combination); Pleurotomella (Azorita) anceyi Nordsieck, 1968

= Pleurotomella anceyi =

Species of sea snail

Pleurotomella anceyi is a species of sea snail, a marine gastropod mollusk in the family Raphitomidae.

== Description ==
The shell attains a length of 7.4 mm, its diameter 3.4 mm.

== Distribution ==
This marine species was found off the Azores at a depth of 1,360 m.
