= Pleurotomella rappardi =

Scientific classification
- Kingdom: Animalia
- Phylum: Mollusca
- Class: Gastropoda
- Subclass: Caenogastropoda
- Order: Neogastropoda
- Superfamily: Conoidea
- Family: Raphitomidae
- Genus: Pleurotomella
- Species: †P. rappardi

Binomial name
- †Pleurotomella rappardi (von Koenen, 1867)

Synonyms
- Pleurotomella (Pleurotomella) rappardi (Koenen, 1867)

Extinct species of gastropod

Pleurotomella rappardi is an extinct species of sea snail, a marine gastropod mollusk in the family Raphitomidae.

== Distribution ==
Fossils of this marine species were found in Oligocene strata in Rhineland, Germany
