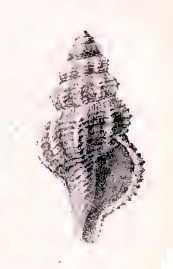
- Original image of a shell of Pleurotomella itama

Scientific classification
- Kingdom: Animalia
- Phylum: Mollusca
- Class: Gastropoda
- Subclass: Caenogastropoda
- Order: Neogastropoda
- Superfamily: Conoidea
- Family: Raphitomidae
- Genus: Pleurotomella
- Species: P. itama

Binomial name
- Pleurotomella itama (Melvill, 1906)

Synonyms
- Daphnella (Pleurotomella) itama Melvill, 1906

= Pleurotomella itama =

Species of gastropod

Pleurotomella itama is a species of sea snail, a marine gastropod mollusk in the family Raphitomidae.

== Description ==
The length of the shell attains 6 mm, its diameter 2 mm.

This little, fusiform shell contains 7-8 whorls, including a three to four ventricose-whorled, beautifully cancellate, ochre-colored protoconch. The whorls of the spire are impressed at the suture and angulate in their middle. The few longitudinal ribs are remarkably incrassate, and are crossed by the spiral lirae, which give a roughened appearance to the whole surface. The aperture is ovate. The outer lip spreads out loosely. The siphonal canal is very short. The columella is simple. The shell is straw-colored to brownish.

== Distribution ==
{This marine species occurs in the Gulf of Oman
