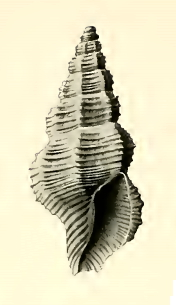
- Original image of a shell of Pleurotomella capricornea

Scientific classification
- Kingdom: Animalia
- Phylum: Mollusca
- Class: Gastropoda
- Subclass: Caenogastropoda
- Order: Neogastropoda
- Superfamily: Conoidea
- Family: Raphitomidae
- Genus: Pleurotomella
- Species: P. capricornea

Binomial name
- Pleurotomella capricornea (Hedley, 1922)

Synonyms
- Asperdaphne capricornea Hedley, 1922 (original combination)

= Pleurotomella capricornea =

Species of sea snail

Pleurotomella capricornea is a species of sea snail, a marine gastropod mollusk in the family Raphitomidae.

== Description ==
The length of the shell attains 4.5 mm, its diameter 2 mm.

(Original description) The small shell is lanceolate and contracted at the sutures. The substance is rather thin and translucent. Its colour is either white, buff, or pale pink above, afterwards turning to buff or white. The three whorls of the protoconch are always darker, usually brown buff. The shell contains 7½ whorls, including a protoconch of two whorls.

Sculpture : Fine spiral grooves, crossed by still finer radials, ornament the protoconch. The third whorl has a prominent keel on the shoulder, beneath which is a fainter spiral. On the fourth whorl the radials first appear as eight prominent round-backed ribs, crossed by two, afterwards three, spiral cords, forming deep meshes by their intersection. The ribs descend continuously and obliquely from whorl to whorl, but decrease in relative importance. The spirals multiply by intercalation till on the body whorl they amount to twenty-five, but there also they are insignificant compared to their initial stage. Two or three of the peripheral spirals project beyond the succeeding fasciole. The fasciole is distinct, crossed by sharp thread-like radials.

Aperture: The sinus is simple and rather shallow. The inner lip shows a slight callus. The siphonal canal is short and recurved.

== Location ==
This marine species is endemic to Australia and occurs off Queensland.
