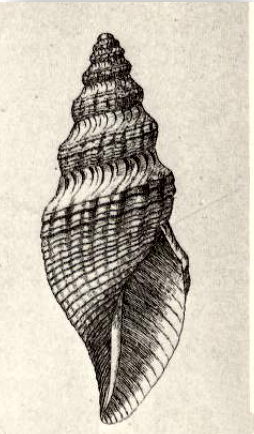
- Original image of a shell of Phymorhynchus sulciferus

Scientific classification
- Kingdom: Animalia
- Phylum: Mollusca
- Class: Gastropoda
- Subclass: Caenogastropoda
- Order: Neogastropoda
- Superfamily: Conoidea
- Family: Raphitomidae
- Genus: Phymorhynchus
- Species: P. sulciferus

Binomial name
- Phymorhynchus sulciferus (Bush, 1893)

Synonyms
- Oenopota (Belomitra) decoloratum Nordsieck, 1977; Phymorhynchus sulcifer Bush, 1893; Pleurotomella adelpha Dautzenberg & Fischer, 1896; Pleurotoma decoloratum Locard, E.A.A., 1897; Pleurotoma fischeri Locard, 1897; Pleurotoma fischeri costulata (var.) Locard, E.A.A., 1897; Pleurotoma imum Locard, 1897; Pleurotoma milneedwardsi Locard, 1897; Pleurotomella sulcifera Bush, 1893

= Phymorhynchus sulciferus =

Species of gastropod

Phymorhynchus sulciferus is a species of sea snail, a marine gastropod mollusk in the family Raphitomidae.

== Description ==
The length of the shell attains 30 mm, its diameter 12 mm.

(Original description) The fusiform shell is rather large, rather thin, translucent white with very little lustre. It has a high, regularly tapered spire of six obtusely shouldered whorls, not counting the protoconch which is broken off, and a long, nearly straight columella and a broad, straight aperture occupying about half the length of the shell. The posterior sinus is as broad as the subsutural band, shallow, slightly broken. The outer lip is thin, curving very gently to join the columella with but a very slight bending in anteriorly, not forming a well-defined siphonal canal. The columella shows a thin, narrow strip of enamel extending its entire length. The suture is inconspicuous. The subsutural band is rather broad, oblique, crossed by delicate slightly curved riblets, most distinct on the upper whorls. Narrow, oblique, angular ribs, fifteen on the body whorl, separated by rather deep, narrow spaces, cross the whorls, rising just above the periphery and not quite reaching to the suture. These are cut just above the middle by a broad, shallow groove, making them appear, especially on the body whorl, as two rows of nodules. In some positions of the shell there seems to be a second similar groove (scarcely discernible) below this one. The spiral sculpture is very irregular. On the body whorl, below the transverse ribs, there are from twenty-five to thirty shallow grooves, varying in width, and having between them flattened bauds or threads. On the siphonal canal they are so close together that their interspaces appear like rounded threads. Above these, about the middle of the whorl, they are very broad, and separated by equally broad flattened bands, while still above these, below the ribs, they are again narrowed and separated by flattened threads. On the ribs the grooves also vary considerably. On each side of the principal groove, a rather broad, flattened thread forms a slight crest on the summit of the ribs, and beyond the lower one of these there are two or three fine rounded threads. The principal groove is also interrupted by a rounded thread at about the middle, and two or three very faint ones above and below it. On the upper part of the ribs there are two or three unequal grooves. On the penultimate whorl there are four grooves below the principal one, separated by nearly equal spaces, with but a single rounded thread on the centre of the first or principal one. With the exception of the subsutural band, the surface is covered with microscopic striae, which, in intersecting the inconspicuous lines of growth, give a peculiar crinkled appearance to the surface.

== Distribution ==
P. sulciferus can be found off the North American coastline, ranging from South Carolina to Texas.; also in the Atlantic Ocean off Morocco (described as Pleurotoma decoloratum).
