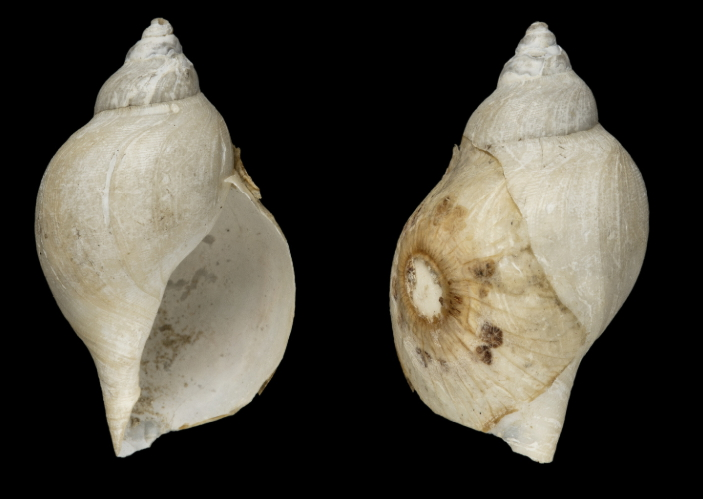
- Shell of Xanthodaphne membranacea

Scientific classification
- Kingdom: Animalia
- Phylum: Mollusca
- Class: Gastropoda
- Subclass: Caenogastropoda
- Order: Neogastropoda
- Superfamily: Conoidea
- Family: Raphitomidae
- Genus: Xanthodaphne; Powell, 1942

Type species
- Pleurotoma membranacea R. B. Watson, 1886

Species
- See text

= Xanthodaphne =

Genus of gastropods

Xanthodaphne is a genus of sea snails, marine gastropod mollusks in the family Raphitomidae.

== Species ==
Species within the genus Xanthodaphne include:

- Xanthodaphne alessandropaglii Nappo & Pagli, 2022
- Xanthodaphne araneosa (R. B. Watson, 1881)
- Xanthodaphne argeta (Dall, 1890)
- Xanthodaphne bougainvillensis Sysoev, 1988
- Xanthodaphne charcotiana Bouchet & Warén, 1980<
- Xanthodaphne cladara Sysoev, 1997
- † Xanthodaphne contarinii Petracci, Bongiardino, Della Bella & Tabanelli, 2019
- Xanthodaphne dalmasi (Dautzenberg & Fischer, 1897)
- Xanthodaphne egregia (Dall, 1908)
- Xanthodaphne encella (Dall, 1908)
- Xanthodaphne heterogramma (Odhner, 1960)
- Xanthodaphne imparella (Dall, 1908)
- Xanthodaphne leptalea (Bush, 1893)
- Xanthodaphne levis Sysoev, 1988
- Xanthodaphne maldivica Sysoev, 1996
- Xanthodaphne maoria Dell, 1956
- Xanthodaphne membranacea (Watson, 1886)
- Xanthodaphne pachia (R. B. Watson, 1881)
- Xanthodaphne palauensis Sysoev, 1988
- Xanthodaphne pastorinoi Kantor, Harasewych & Puillandre, 2016
- † Xanthodaphne pederzanii Tabanelli & Bongiardino, 2018
- Xanthodaphne pichi Figueira & Absalão, 2012
- Xanthodaphne pompholyx (Dall, 1889)
- Xanthodaphne pyriformis (Schepman, 1913)
- Xanthodaphne pyrropelex (Barnard, 1963)
- Xanthodaphne raineri (Engl, 2008)
- Xanthodaphne sedillina (Dall, 1908)
- Xanthodaphne sofia (Dall, 1889)
- Xanthodaphne subrosea (Barnard, 1963)
- Xanthodaphne suffusa (Dall, 1890)
- Xanthodaphne tenuistriata Sysoev, 1988
- Xanthodaphne translucida (Watson, 1881)
- Xanthodaphne tropica Sysoev & Ivanov, 1985

Species brought into synonymy

- Xanthodaphne agonia (Dall, 1890): synonym of Pueridaphne agonia (Dall, 1890)
- † Xanthodaphne bermejensis Vera-Peláez, 2002: synonym of † Lusitanops bermejensis (Vera-Peláez, 2002) superseded combination)
- Xanthodaphne bruneri (Verrill, 1884): synonym of Pueridaphne bruneri (A. E. Verrill & S. Smith, 1884)
- Xanthodaphne folini Locard, 1897: synonym of Xanthodaphne leptalea (Bush, 1893)
- Xanthodaphne xanthias (Watson, 1886): synonym of Austrobela xanthias (R. B. Watson, 1886)
