= Xanthodaphne egregia =

Scientific classification
- Kingdom: Animalia
- Phylum: Mollusca
- Class: Gastropoda
- Subclass: Caenogastropoda
- Order: Neogastropoda
- Superfamily: Conoidea
- Family: Raphitomidae
- Genus: Xanthodaphne
- Species: X. egregia

Binomial name
- Xanthodaphne egregia (Dall, 1908)

Synonyms
- Pleurotomella (Gymnobela) egregia Dall, 1908

Species of gastropod

Xanthodaphne egregia is a species of sea snail, a marine gastropod mollusk in the family Raphitomidae.

== Description ==
The length of the shell attains 45 mm.

(original description) Shell of the same type Xanthodaphne agonia, but larger and proportionally much stouter, of the same pinkish brown color and delicate construction, and about five whorls. The spire is subconoid, with distinct suture and well-rounded whorls. The sculpture is similar to that of X. agonia but more emphatic, particularly the arcuate wrinkles which cross the anal fasciole. The aperture is wide. The anal sulcus is deep and rounded. The outer lip is thin, roundly produced in front. There is no perceptible callus on the body. The columella is thin, twisted, obliquely. truncate in front. The siphonal canal is very short and rather contracted, the axis not pervious.

== Distribution ==
This marine species occurs off Peru.
