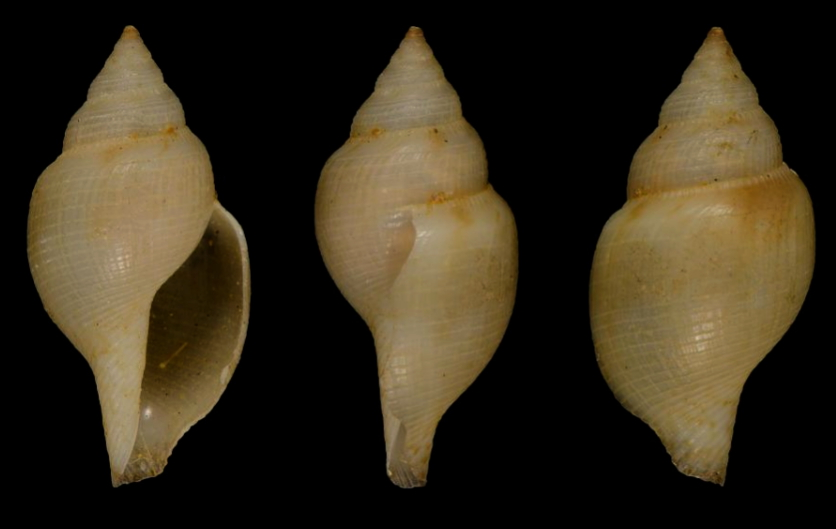
- Shell of Xanthodaphne pompholyx (syntype at the Smithsonian Institution)

Scientific classification
- Kingdom: Animalia
- Phylum: Mollusca
- Class: Gastropoda
- Subclass: Caenogastropoda
- Order: Neogastropoda
- Superfamily: Conoidea
- Family: Raphitomidae
- Genus: Xanthodaphne
- Species: X. pompholyx

Binomial name
- Xanthodaphne pompholyx (Dall, 1889)

Synonyms
- Daphnella pompholyx (Dall, 1889); Mangilia pompholyx Dall, 1889

= Xanthodaphne pompholyx =

Species of gastropod

Xanthodaphne pompholyx is a species of sea snail, a marine gastropod mollusk in the family Raphitomidae.

== Description ==
The length of the shell attains 12 mm.

(Original description) The thin, inflated, polished shell shows a brown reticulated protoconch of three whorls, and five subsequent whorls. The color is yellowish white, with faint axially directed streaks and blotches of olive brown, and articulating dots of the same in the region of the siphonal canal. The spiral sculpture consists of faint close-set scratches or half-obsolete minute threads more or less visible over the whole surface, and on the body whorl in front of the fasciole about twenty-five channelled sharply cut grooves separated by considerably wider flat interspaces. The grooves are nearer together on the siphonal canal, and the interspaces there become rounded, almost threadlike. The transverse sculpture consists of, on the fasciole, numerous little-elevated arched regularly-spaced ripples, with slightly wider interspaces. These fade away in front of the fasciole, or appear only as irregularities of growth which punctuate the channels but are obsolete on the interspaces. The whorls are rounded, fasciole only slightly excavated, the posterior edge appressed at the suture. The aperture is large. The outer lip is rather straight in the middle, contracted suddenly to form the siphonal canal, the edge sharp, the sculpture transvisible, the notch shallow and its corners rounded off. The columella is straight, simple, rather long. The siphonal canal is distinct, not recurved. The periphery of the body whorl is a little flattened.

== Distribution ==
The holotype of this marine species was found off Barbados at a depth of 256 m.
