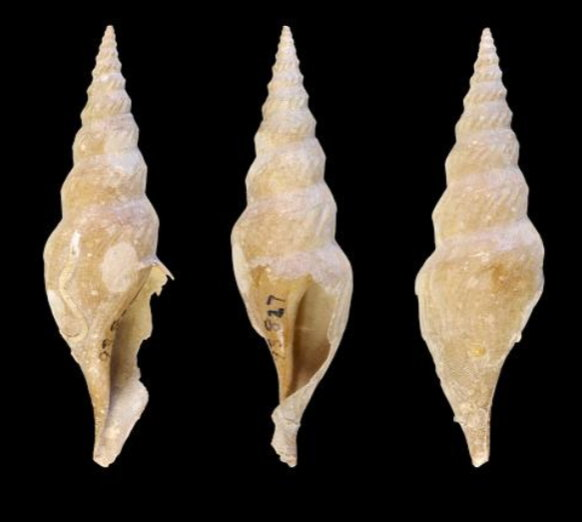
- Shell of Xanthodaphne sofia (holotype at the Smithsonian Institution)

Scientific classification
- Kingdom: Animalia
- Phylum: Mollusca
- Class: Gastropoda
- Subclass: Caenogastropoda
- Order: Neogastropoda
- Superfamily: Conoidea
- Family: Raphitomidae
- Genus: Xanthodaphne
- Species: X. sofia

Binomial name
- Xanthodaphne sofia (Dall, 1889)

Synonyms
- Eubela sofia (Dall, 1889); Mangilia (Daphnella) sofia Dall, 1889; Mangilia (Daphnella) sofia var. hyperlissa Dall, 1889; Mangilia sofia Dall, 1889; Xanthodaphne sofia hyperlissa (Dall, 1889)

= Xanthodaphne sofia =

Species of gastropod

Xanthodaphne sofia is a species of sea snail, a marine gastropod mollusk in the family Raphitomidae.

== Description ==
The length of the shell attains 8 mm, its diameter 3 mm.

(Original description) The small, delicate shell is whitish, with a four-whorled brown, trochiform, sinusigera protoconch and four subsequent rather slender whorls. The transverse sculpture consists of faint delicate lines of growth, which are puckered or gathered into a sort of narrow frill or band, appressed against the suture and bounded in front by the smooth anal fasciole, on which the anterior ends of the wavelets become obsolete. The spiral sculpture is rather strong on the periphery of some of the earlier whorls, but elsewhere consists of faint threads and grooves which are extended forward more or less distinctly to the end of the siphonal canal. The notch is small, not deep and close to the suture. The fasciole is smooth and slightly impressed. The aperture is elongate and simple (the specimen being an adolescent). The thin columella is without callus. Its edge is slightly reflected and so twisted as to make the axis of the shell, viewed from the anterior end, minutely pervious. The siphonal canal is narrow and rather long. The thin outer lip is arched forward.

== Distribution ==
This marine species occurs off South Carolina, USA; Guadeloupe
