= Xanthodaphne translucida =

Scientific classification
- Kingdom: Animalia
- Phylum: Mollusca
- Class: Gastropoda
- Subclass: Caenogastropoda
- Order: Neogastropoda
- Superfamily: Conoidea
- Family: Raphitomidae
- Genus: Xanthodaphne
- Species: X. translucida

Binomial name
- Xanthodaphne translucida (Watson, 1881)

Synonyms
- Daphnella translucida Watson, 1881; Pleurotoma (Thesbia) translucida Watson, 1881; Typhlodaphne translucida (Watson, R.B., 1881)

Species of gastropod

Xanthodaphne translucida is a species of sea snail, a marine gastropod mollusk in the family Raphitomidae.

== Description ==
The shell grows to a length of 10 mm.

(Original description) Animal: The foot is fuscous olive, large, thick, square in front, pointed behind. The mantle is paler. The siphon is rather short. The head and the tentacles are pale. The eyes are large and black, on the upper outer side and at about a fourth of the length of the tentacles, which are rather solid, long, and cylindrical. Between these, and a little above them, is the large prominent expanded snout, with a large circular opening in front, round which the edge of the snout projects like a thick fleshy fringe. There are two unequal branchial plumes. The radula consists of exceptionally minute, acicular, sharp-pointed, horny prickles. There is no operculum

Shell. The shell is thin, horny, smooth, oval, with a tumid body whorl, a rather high, subscalar, small-pointed, round-whorled, shallow-sutured conical spire, and a tumid lop-sided base, pointed at the columella, but with scarcely any snout.

Sculpture. Longitudinals — there are close-set fine hairlike lines of growth. Under the microscope a system of much finer regular striae is seen to cover the whole surface. Spirals — there are many fine, irregular, and unequal rounded striae, which faintly appear on the surface, but are distinct on the columella and front of the shell. Besides these, there are fine microscopic smooth scratches. The colour of the shell is white, with a faint tinge of yellow, horny, translucent, with a smooth and shining, but hardly glossy, surface. The spire is rather high, conical, subscalar, from a slight bulge of the shoulder. The protoconch is small, conical, rounded, with the extreme tip flattened down. The six whorls are rounded, tumid, with a faint subangulation below the sinus-area, in which there is a flattening rather than a constriction of the surface. Below the periphery of each whorl the form is cylindrical, with a very slight contraction into the lower suture. The whorls increase regularly, but rapidly. The body whorl is large and tumid, with a protracted rounded base cut off on the left by an oblique, scarcely concave line. There is scarcely any snout, and the shell is truncated obliquely towards the point of the columella, which projects in a rectangular prominence. The suture is linear and impressed. The aperture is very large, lop-sidedly oval, pointed above and below. The outer lip shows a semicircular curve in both planes, leaving a shallow, wide, shortly rounded sinus between the lip-edge and the body. The inner lip shows a thin, narrow pad stretched very regularly along its whole length (which forms a very regular concave curve) out to the thin, twisted, obliquely truncated edge of the columella. This edge runs out beyond the labial pad, and forms a thin sharp margin along the siphonal canal.

== Distribution ==
This marine species occurs in the Weddell Sea, Antarctica; also off Kerguelen and Crozet Island.
