= Xanthodaphne heterogramma =

Scientific classification
- Kingdom: Animalia
- Phylum: Mollusca
- Class: Gastropoda
- Subclass: Caenogastropoda
- Order: Neogastropoda
- Superfamily: Conoidea
- Family: Raphitomidae
- Genus: Xanthodaphne
- Species: X. heterogramma

Binomial name
- Xanthodaphne heterogramma (Odhner, 1960)

Synonyms
- Pleurotomella heterogramma Odhner, 1960

Species of gastropod

Xanthodaphne heterogramma is a species of sea snail, a marine gastropod mollusk in the family Raphitomidae.

== Description ==
The length of the shell attains 25 mm.

== Distribution ==
This marine species occurs in the Atlantic Ocean off Northern Brazil.
