= Xanthodaphne pichi =

Scientific classification
- Kingdom: Animalia
- Phylum: Mollusca
- Class: Gastropoda
- Subclass: Caenogastropoda
- Order: Neogastropoda
- Superfamily: Conoidea
- Family: Raphitomidae
- Genus: Xanthodaphne
- Species: X. pichi

Binomial name
- Xanthodaphne pichi Figueira & Absalão, 2012

Species of gastropod

Xanthodaphne pichi is a species of sea snail, a marine gastropod mollusk in the family Raphitomidae.

== Distribution ==
This marine species was found in the Campos Basin, southeast Brazil
