= Pueridaphne =

Scientific classification
- Kingdom: Animalia
- Phylum: Mollusca
- Class: Gastropoda
- Subclass: Caenogastropoda
- Order: Neogastropoda
- Superfamily: Conoidea
- Family: Raphitomidae
- Genus: Pueridaphne; Criscione, Hallan, Puillandre & Fedosov, 2020

Type species
- Pueridaphne cirrisulcata Criscione, Hallan, Puillandre & Fedosov, 2020

Genus of gastropods

Pueridaphne is a genus of sea snails, marine gastropod mollusks in the family Raphitomidae.

== Species ==
- Pueridaphne agonia (Dall, 1890)
- Pueridaphne bruneri (A. E. Verrill & S. Smith, 1884)

Synonyms

- Pueridaphne cirrisulcata Criscione, Hallan, Puillandre & Fedosov, 2020: synonym of Pueridaphne bruneri (A. E. Verrill & S. Smith, 1884) (junior subjective synonym)
