= Xanthodaphne levis =

Scientific classification
- Kingdom: Animalia
- Phylum: Mollusca
- Class: Gastropoda
- Subclass: Caenogastropoda
- Order: Neogastropoda
- Superfamily: Conoidea
- Family: Raphitomidae
- Genus: Xanthodaphne
- Species: X. levis

Binomial name
- Xanthodaphne levis Sysoev, 1988

Species of gastropod

Xanthodaphne levis is a species of sea snail, a marine gastropod mollusk in the family Raphitomidae.

== Distribution ==
This marine species was found on the Bougainville Trench, New Guinea.
