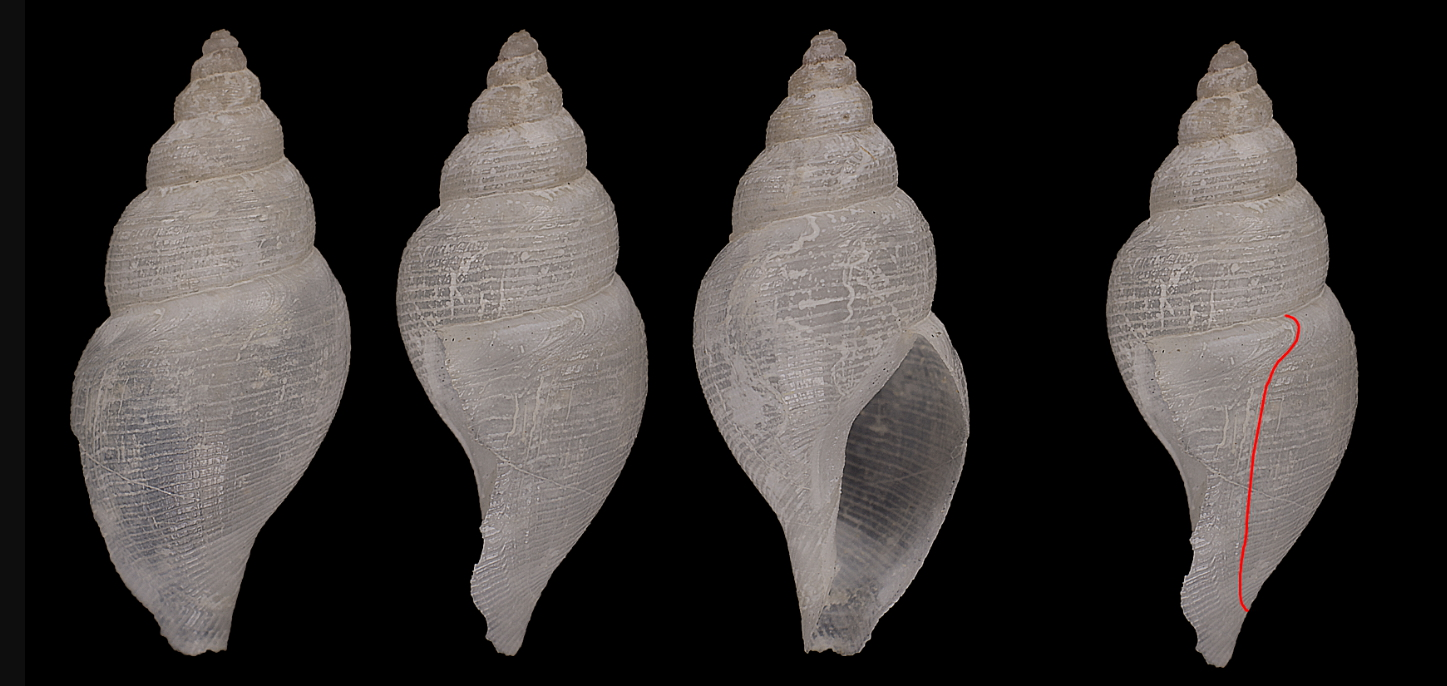
- Shell of Xanthodaphne alessandropaglii (holotype at MNHN, Paris)

Scientific classification
- Kingdom: Animalia
- Phylum: Mollusca
- Class: Gastropoda
- Subclass: Caenogastropoda
- Order: Neogastropoda
- Superfamily: Conoidea
- Family: Raphitomidae
- Genus: Xanthodaphne
- Species: X. alessandropaglii

Binomial name
- Xanthodaphne alessandropaglii Nappo & Pagli, 2022

= Xanthodaphne alessandropaglii =

Species of gastropod

Xanthodaphne alessandropaglii is a species of sea snail, a marine gastropod mollusk in the family Raphitomidae.

== Description ==
The length of the shell attains 9.5 mm.

== Distribution ==
This marine species was found in the Alboran Sea, Mediterranean Sea.
