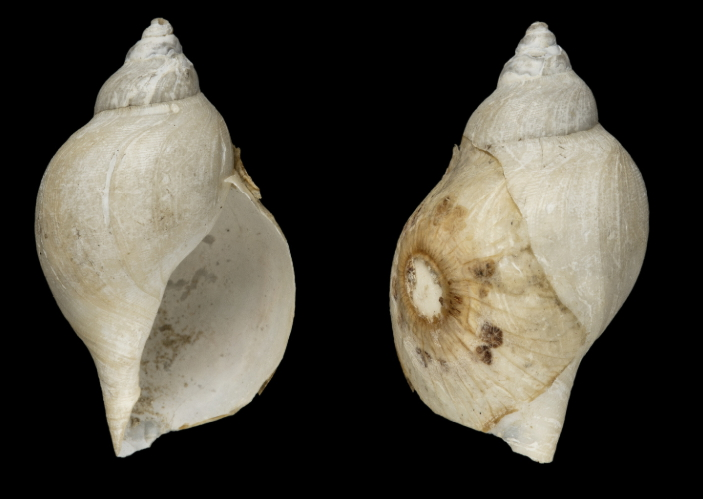
- Shell of Xanthodaphne membranacea (specimen at Natural History Museum, London)

Scientific classification
- Kingdom: Animalia
- Phylum: Mollusca
- Class: Gastropoda
- Subclass: Caenogastropoda
- Order: Neogastropoda
- Superfamily: Conoidea
- Family: Raphitomidae
- Genus: Xanthodaphne
- Species: X. membranacea

Binomial name
- Xanthodaphne membranacea (Watson, 1886)

Synonyms
- Pleurotoma (Thesbia) membranacea Watson, 1886

= Xanthodaphne membranacea =

Species of gastropod

Xanthodaphne membranacea is a species of sea snail, a marine gastropod mollusk in the family Raphitomidae.

== Description ==
The length of the shell attains 22 mm, its diameter 13 mm.

(Original description) The shell is broad, short, tumid, and membranaceously thin. It has a short spire of few somewhat tumid whorls, which are parted by a slight horizontal suture. The surface is smooth and feebly spiralled. The colour of the shell is white, under a thin brownish-yellow smooth persistent membranaceous epidermis. The base is long and gradually contracted,. The snout is broad and lop-sided. The sinus lies close up to the suture.

Sculpture: Longitudinals—there are fine irregular unequal hair-like lines of growth, which are finely puckered below the suture. Spirals—the whole surface is scored by very slight remote impressed lines, and flat feeble threadlets, which are very irregular, and are interrupted at every biggish line of growth. Just below the suture these are a little feebler, broader, and more regular than elsewhere.

The colour is white, under a brownish-yellow, smooth, glossy, thin, membranaceous epidermis. It is entirely translucent from the excessive thinness of the shell.

The conical spire is short-pointed. The protoconch is eroded but evidently small. There are five remaining whorls. They are short, broadish, and a little tumid, convex, rounded, not keeled, not at all contracted below. The body whorl is large, tumid, and elongated, being drawn out on the base, which is long and rounded. The aperture is broad, but is somewhat broken. The suture is linear and slight, but distinct in consequence of the junction of the whorls. The aperture is semi-lunar, sharply angulated above and below. The outer lip is very thin, regularly curved, with a deep wide sinus close up to the suture, whence the front edge of the shell makes a prodigious forward and downward sweep, and then retreats again to the point of the columella. The inner lip does not seem to have even a glaze on the body. There above, the line is convex, but down the very slightly swollen columella it runs direct but very obliquely to the left. The point of the columella is not truncate, but the sharp edge runs out with a twist, and forms a sharp point at the end of the columella. The broad open siphonal canal in front seems not to have been in the slightest degree emarginate.

== Distribution ==
This marine species is endemic to New Zealand and occurs off North Island.
