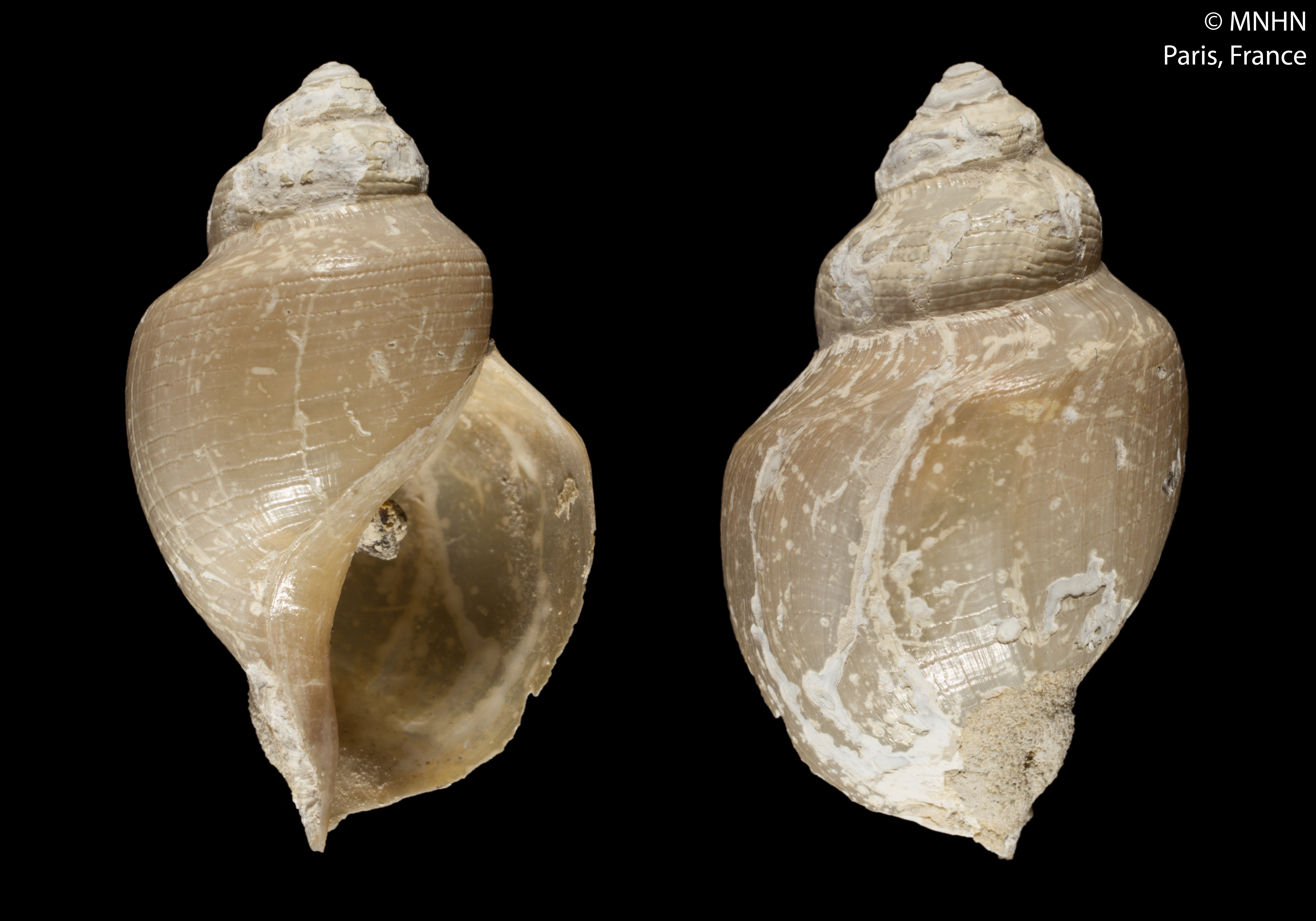
- Shell of Xanthodaphne charcotiana (holotype at MNHN, Paris)

Scientific classification
- Kingdom: Animalia
- Phylum: Mollusca
- Class: Gastropoda
- Subclass: Caenogastropoda
- Order: Neogastropoda
- Superfamily: Conoidea
- Family: Raphitomidae
- Genus: Xanthodaphne
- Species: X. charcotiana

Binomial name
- Xanthodaphne charcotiana Bouchet & Warén, 1980

= Xanthodaphne charcotiana =

Species of gastropod

Xanthodaphne charcotiana is a species of sea snail found in 1980, a marine gastropod mollusk in the family Raphitomidae.

== Description ==
The length of the shell attains 25.5 mm.

== Distribution ==
This marine species occurs off Atlantic France.
