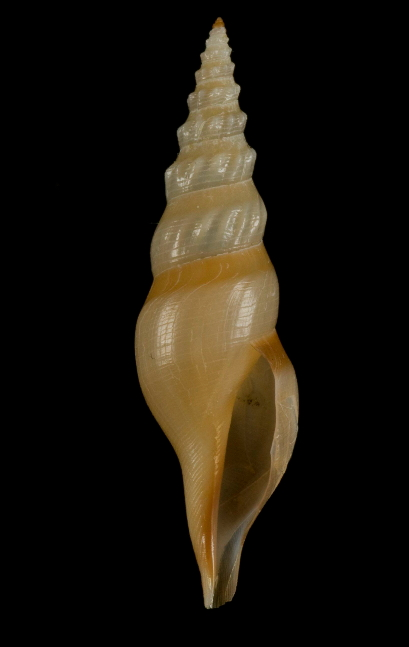
- Shell of Austrobela micraulax (specimen at MNHN, Paris)

Scientific classification
- Kingdom: Animalia
- Phylum: Mollusca
- Class: Gastropoda
- Subclass: Caenogastropoda
- Order: Neogastropoda
- Superfamily: Conoidea
- Family: Raphitomidae
- Genus: Austrobela
- Species: A. micraulax

Binomial name
- Austrobela micraulax (Sysoev, 1997)

Synonyms
- Gymnobela micraulax Sysoev, 1997 (original combination)

= Austrobela micraulax =

Species of gastropod

Austrobela micraulax is a species of sea snail, a marine gastropod mollusk in the family Raphitomidae.

== Description ==
The height of the shell reaches up to 26.6 mm, a diameter of 8.1 mm and 8.5 teleoconch whorls. The shell fusiform are thin, semi-transparent, narrow, and have a high spire comprising approximately 40% of total height of the shell. The suture is shallow and slightly adpressed, with a steeply descending subsutural ramp which is almost flat adapically and concave near the whorl angulation. The axial structure is broad with opisthocline ribs on the penultimate whorl.

== Distribution ==
This marine species occurs off the Tanimbar Islands, Indonesia and in the Arafura Sea, at depths between 884 m - 891 m.

== Etymology ==
The word "Micraulax" means "with small furrows" in Greek to refer to the species' spiral groove.
