= Xanthodaphne pederzanii =

Scientific classification
- Kingdom: Animalia
- Phylum: Mollusca
- Class: Gastropoda
- Subclass: Caenogastropoda
- Order: Neogastropoda
- Superfamily: Conoidea
- Family: Raphitomidae
- Genus: Xanthodaphne
- Species: X. pederzanii

Binomial name
- Xanthodaphne pederzanii Tabanelli & Bongiardino, 2018

Extinct species of gastropod

Xanthodaphne pederzanii is an extinct species of sea snail, a marine gastropod mollusk in the family Raphitomidae.

== Distribution ==
Fossils of this marine species were found in Pleistocene strata of Emilia-Romagna, Italy.
