= Austrobela gypsata =

Scientific classification
- Kingdom: Animalia
- Phylum: Mollusca
- Class: Gastropoda
- Subclass: Caenogastropoda
- Order: Neogastropoda
- Superfamily: Conoidea
- Family: Raphitomidae
- Genus: Austrobela
- Species: A. gypsata

Binomial name
- Austrobela gypsata (Watson, 1881)

Synonyms
- Gymnobela gypsata (R. B. Watson, 1881) superseded combination; Paracomitas gypsata (Watson, 1881); Pleurotoma (Drillia) gypsata Watson, 1881 (original combination); Pleurotoma gypsata R. B. Watson, 1881

Species of gastropod

Austrobela gypsata is a species of sea snail, a marine gastropod mollusk in the family Raphitomidae.

== Description ==
(Original description) Shell.— Strong, fusiform, biconical, scalar, shortly, sharply and obliquely ribbed, keeled, constricted at the suture, with a long and rather inflated body whorl and a largish snout.

Sculpture

Longitudinals—on each whorl is a strongish angulation, forming a shoulder, crowned by a series of narrow elongated tubercles or short ribs. This coronated keel lies on the earlier whorls below, but on the later above the middle. The ribs do not reach the lower suture. In shape and breadth they are irregular, but are always somewhat swollen in the middle and pinched up into prominence. They are parted by flat open furrows of nearly double their width. On the body whorl they extend very little below the shoulder, and still less above it. There are about twenty of these ribs on the last whorl, and fifteen on each of the earlier whorls. The surface is scored with hair-like lines of growth, of which every here and there, and especially on the base in the continuation of the riblets, one is stronger than the rest.

Spirals—the carination at the shoulder is made more prominent by the sharp line of tubercles. The whole surface is covered with flatly rounded threads, which are roughened by the incremental lines. These threads are strongest on the snout, feeble on the body, and very faint in the sinus-area.

Colour: whitish under a yellowish epidermis, which is a rough but thin and persistent membrane.

The spire is high, scalar and conical. The apex is eroded, but evidently small. The shell contains 10 (?) whorls which increase rather rapidly. They are high, angulated, with a long, rather high, and scarcely concave shoulder, and with a straight slight contraction to the lower suture. The body whorl is very large in proportion to the rest, being long and somewhat tumid, and ends in an elongated, broad, unequal-sided snout. The suture is very slight indeed. For though it is defined by the contraction of the whorls above and below, yet the inferior whorl laps up on the one above it so as almost to efface the junction-angle. The aperture is pale buff-coloured within, long and narrow, angulated above, also at the keel, and also, very slightly, at the junction of the columella and the body.

The outer lip : from the body to the keel it is slightly concave and contracted. From the keel it curves very regularly to the point. On leaving the body the line of the edge runs quite straight forward for a short distance, and then curves round to the right, running out on the line of the ribs into a high shouldered prominent wing, between which and the body whorl the broad, deep, and rounded anal sinus lies. Towards the front of the aperture it retreats rapidly to the point of the snout. The inner lip spreads rather broadly on the body, is a little thickened, and has a very slightly raised edge. The columella is long, straight, narrow, and has in front a slightly twisted edge, but is not truncated.

== Distribution ==
This marine species is endemic to North Island, New Zealand.
