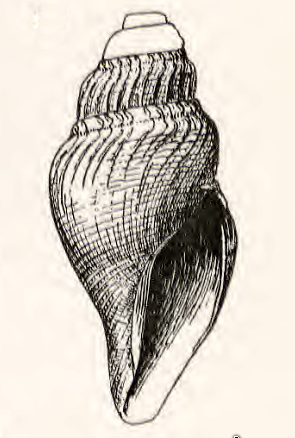
- Original image of a shell of Xanthodaphne sedillina

Scientific classification
- Kingdom: Animalia
- Phylum: Mollusca
- Class: Gastropoda
- Subclass: Caenogastropoda
- Order: Neogastropoda
- Superfamily: Conoidea
- Family: Raphitomidae
- Genus: Xanthodaphne
- Species: X. sedillina

Binomial name
- Xanthodaphne sedillina (Dall, 1908)

Synonyms
- Mangilia sedillina Dall, 1908

= Xanthodaphne sedillina =

Species of gastropod

Xanthodaphne sedillina is a species of sea snail, a marine gastropod mollusk in the family Raphitomidae.

== Description ==
The length of the shell attains 8 mm, its diameter 4 mm.

(Original description) The small, translucent white shell is very thin and fusiform. The protoconch is eroded, with four subsequent whorls. The suture is distinct, whorl in front of it shows a narrow, thickened margin. The whorls are slightly angulated at the shoulder, the angle obsolete on the body whorl. The axial sculpture, in addition to lines of growth of (on the penultimate whorl consists of about twenty-six) fine, sharp, narrow lamellose riblets following the lines of growth, beading the presutural band, angulated at the shoulder and obsolete on the base, with wider, excavated interspaces. These are crossed by very numerous, fine, close-set, spiral threads, slightly coarser on the siphonal canal and minutely feebly reticulated by the incremental lines. The body and the columella are polished. The sculpture is erased. The outer lip is thin, simple, with a wide sulcus occupying the space between the suture and the shoulder, in front of which it is arcuately protractive. The columella is straight, simple and obliquely truncate in front. The siphonal canal is short, wide and not recurved. The operculum is absent.

There is also a variety with stronger sculpture, shorter and stouter shell, and a distinctly recurved canal.

== Distribution ==
This marine species occurs in the Gulf of Panama.
