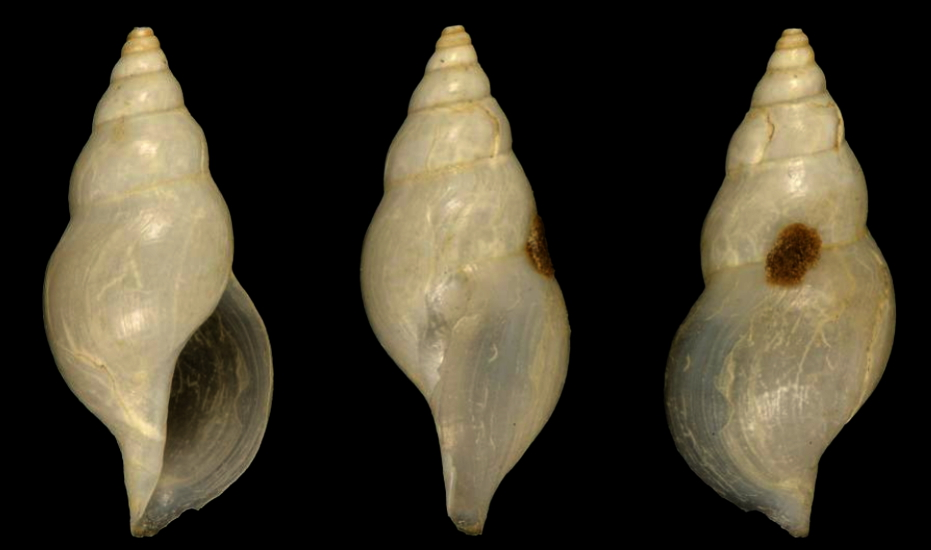
- Shell of Xanthodaphne imparella (lectotype at the Smithsonian Institution)

Scientific classification
- Kingdom: Animalia
- Phylum: Mollusca
- Class: Gastropoda
- Subclass: Caenogastropoda
- Order: Neogastropoda
- Superfamily: Conoidea
- Family: Raphitomidae
- Genus: Xanthodaphne
- Species: X. imparella

Binomial name
- Xanthodaphne imparella (Dall, 1908)

Synonyms
- Daphnella (Eubela) imparella Dall, 1908

= Xanthodaphne imparella =

Species of gastropod

Xanthodaphne imparella is a species of sea snail, a marine gastropod mollusk in the family Raphitomidae.

== Description ==
The length of the shell attains 12.7 mm, its diameter 5.5 mm.

(Original description) The small, translucent white shell is smooth, polished, very thin, with a three-whorled yellow protoconch of the " Sinusigera " type, ending abruptly. The form of the shell is fusoid. The whorls are gently rounded, with about four whorls following the protoconch, marked only with lines of growth, obscure spiral markings, and on the siphonal canal a few obsolete spiral threads. The suture is distinct, not marginate. The aperture is lunate. The anal sulcus is very wide and shallow. The outer lip is thin, arcuately protractivc. The body is smooth. The columella is straight, obliquely truncate in front, hardly callous. The siphonal canal is wide, shallow, not recurved.

== Distribution ==
The holotype of this marine species was found off Azuero Peninsula, southeast of Punta Mala, Panama, North Pacific Ocean at a depth of 2323 m.
