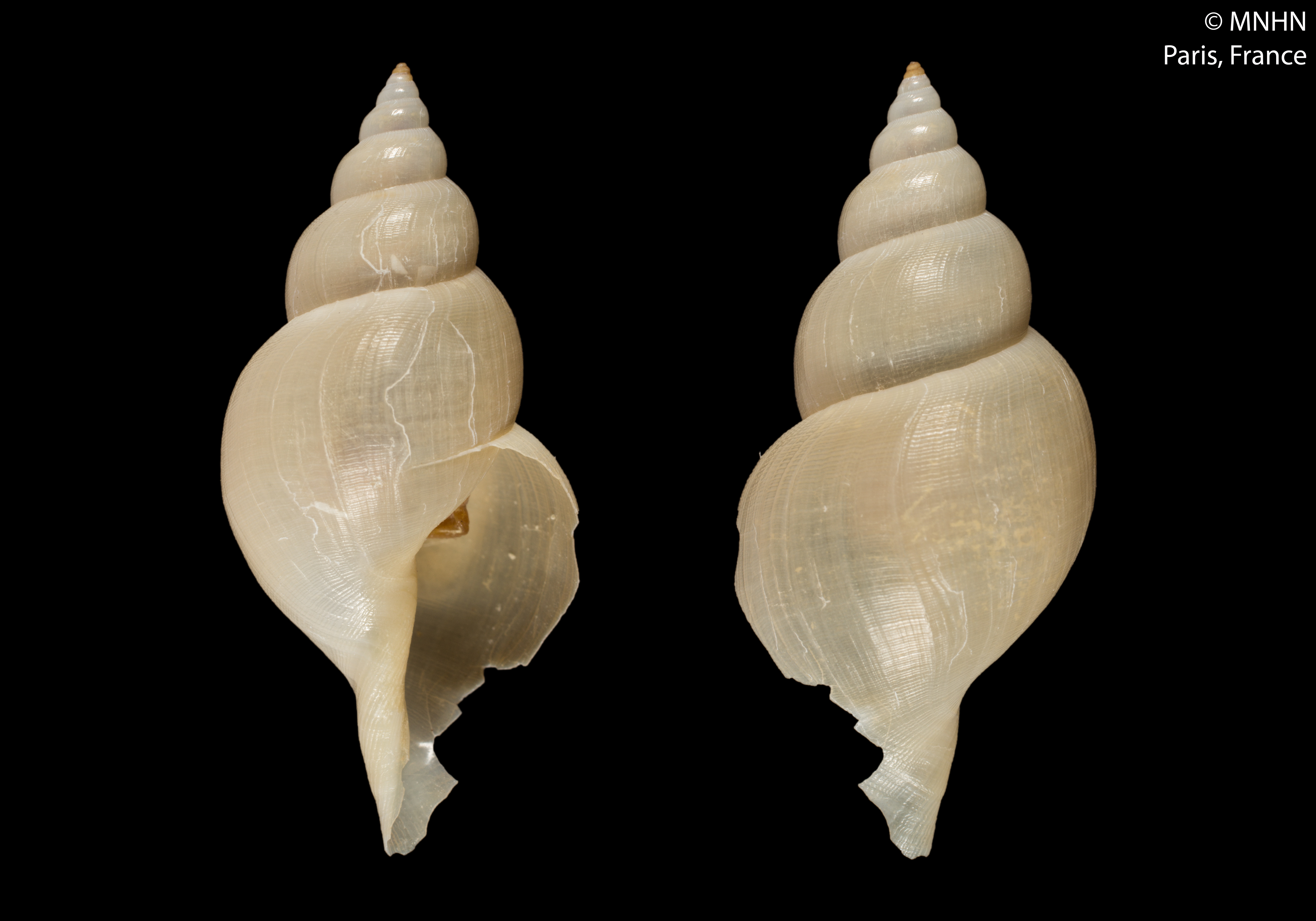
- Shell of Xanthodaphne cladara (holotype at MNHN, Paris)

Scientific classification
- Kingdom: Animalia
- Phylum: Mollusca
- Class: Gastropoda
- Subclass: Caenogastropoda
- Order: Neogastropoda
- Superfamily: Conoidea
- Family: Raphitomidae
- Genus: Xanthodaphne
- Species: X. cladara

Binomial name
- Xanthodaphne cladara Sysoev, 1997

= Xanthodaphne cladara =

Species of gastropod

Xanthodaphne cladara is a species of sea snail, a marine gastropod mollusk in the family Raphitomidae.

== Description ==
The length of the shell attains 30.3 mm.

== Distribution ==
This marine species occurs off Eastern Indonesia.
