= Xanthodaphne maoria =

Scientific classification
- Kingdom: Animalia
- Phylum: Mollusca
- Class: Gastropoda
- Subclass: Caenogastropoda
- Order: Neogastropoda
- Superfamily: Conoidea
- Family: Raphitomidae
- Genus: Xanthodaphne
- Species: X. maoria

Binomial name
- Xanthodaphne maoria Dell, 1956

Species of gastropod

Xanthodaphne maoria is a species of sea snail, a marine gastropod mollusk in the family Raphitomidae.

== Distribution ==
This marine species is endemic to New Zealand and occurs off the Chatham Islands, New Zealand
