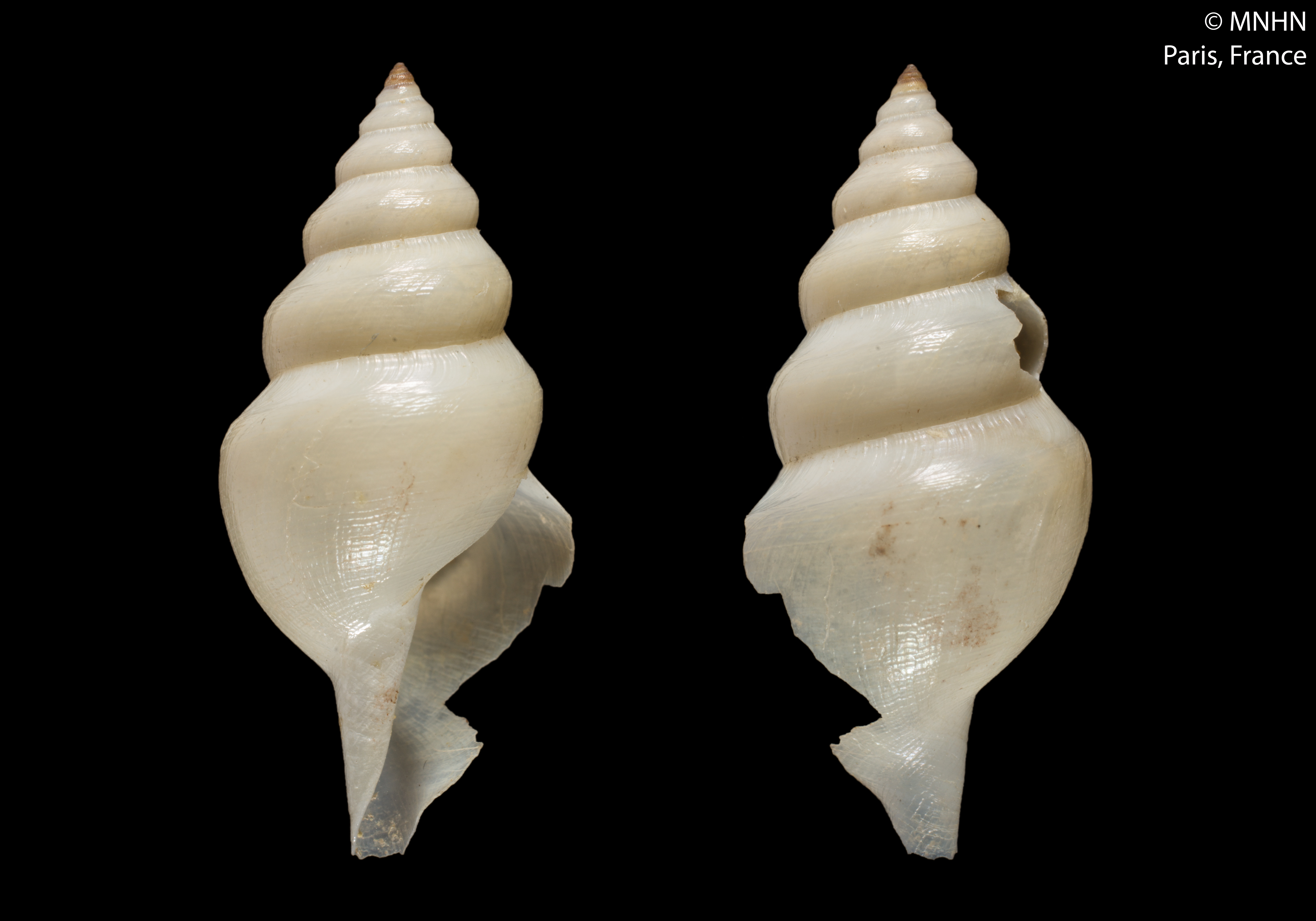
- Shell of Xanthodaphne leptalea (holotype at MNHN, Paris)

Scientific classification
- Kingdom: Animalia
- Phylum: Mollusca
- Class: Gastropoda
- Subclass: Caenogastropoda
- Order: Neogastropoda
- Superfamily: Conoidea
- Family: Raphitomidae
- Genus: Xanthodaphne
- Species: X. leptalea

Binomial name
- Xanthodaphne leptalea (Bush, 1893)

Synonyms
- Pleurotomella leptalea Bush, 1893; Thesbia folini Locard, 1897; Xanthodaphne folini Locard, 1897

= Xanthodaphne leptalea =

Species of gastropod

Xanthodaphne leptalea is a species of sea snail, a marine gastropod mollusk in the family Raphitomidae.

== Description ==
The length of the shell attains 24 mm.

(Original description) The shell is of moderate size, rather stout, very thin and fragile, delicately tinted with brown below the chestnut-brown tip. It consists of four obtusely shouldered whorls besides the protoconch. The aperture is long, rather broad, pinched in anteriorly, forming a moderately long, narrow siphonal canal. The outer lip is badly broken, but, judging by the lines of growth, sweeps well forward from the posterior sinus, which is as wide as the subsutural band, and deepest next the suture. The columella is very straight with a narrow, very thin, closely adhering layer of enamel. The subsutural band is broad, oblique, crossed by numerous very delicate curved riblets and lines of growth, most conspicuous just at the suture. At the angle of the shoulder just below the periphery there is, on the two upper whorls, a row of small nodules, which gradually disappear on the penultimate whorl and are entirely wanting on the body whorl. The spiral sculpture consists of narrow, shallow grooves separated by rather broad, flattened bands of nearly uniform width, which cover the entire surface except the subsutural band and protoconch. Those on the shoulder are a little closer together than elsewhere. Lines of growth are rather indistinct. The protoconch is large, consisting of four conspicuously reticulated, chestnut-brown whorls which increase in size very abruptly from the very small apical whorl.

== Distribution ==
This species occurs in the Atlantic Ocean off Morocco at a depth of 2212 m; also off North Carolina and South Carolina, USA.
