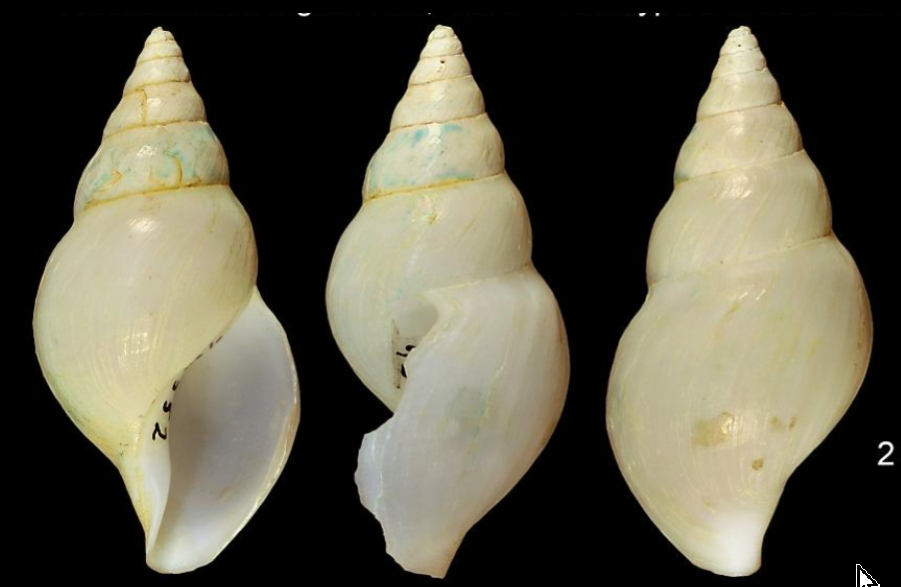
- Shell of Xanthodaphne argeta (holotype at the Smithsonian Institution)

Scientific classification
- Kingdom: Animalia
- Phylum: Mollusca
- Class: Gastropoda
- Subclass: Caenogastropoda
- Order: Neogastropoda
- Superfamily: Conoidea
- Family: Raphitomidae
- Genus: Xanthodaphne
- Species: X. argeta

Binomial name
- Xanthodaphne argeta (Dall, 1890)

Synonyms
- Mangilia argeta Dall, 1890; Mangilia (Pleurotomella) argeta Dall, 1890; Phymorhynchus argeta (Dall, 1890); Pleurotomella (Phymorhynchus) argeta Dall, 1908

= Xanthodaphne argeta =

Species of gastropod

Xanthodaphne argeta is a species of sea snail, a marine gastropod mollusk in the family Raphitomidae.

== Description ==
The length of the shell attains 43 mm, its diameter 20 mm.

(Original description) The polished shell is short-fusiform, snow white, eight- whorled. The protoconch is eroded in the specimen. The whorls are full, oppressed in front of the suture, elsewhere gently rounded. The transverse sculpture consists of delicate incremental lines. The spiral sculpture consists of obscure almost microscopic striae and a few close set extremely fine threads on the siphonal canal. The aperture is elongated. The anal notch is very shallow and rounded; leaving only a faint slightly flattened fasciole. The outer lip is sharp, simple, arched well forward, especially anteriorly. The body is without callus. The columella is thin, white, short, slightly twisted. The siphonal canal is short, very wide and hardly differentiated

== Distribution ==
This marine species was found near the Galapagos Islands at a depth of 1485 m.
