= Xanthodaphne pastorinoi =

Scientific classification
- Kingdom: Animalia
- Phylum: Mollusca
- Class: Gastropoda
- Subclass: Caenogastropoda
- Order: Neogastropoda
- Superfamily: Conoidea
- Family: Raphitomidae
- Genus: Xanthodaphne
- Species: X. pastorinoi

Binomial name
- Xanthodaphne pastorinoi Kantor, Harasewych & Puillandre, 2016

Species of gastropod

Xanthodaphne pastorinoi is a species of sea snail, a marine gastropod mollusk in the family Raphitomidae.

== Distribution ==
This marine species was found off the South Sandwich Islands .
