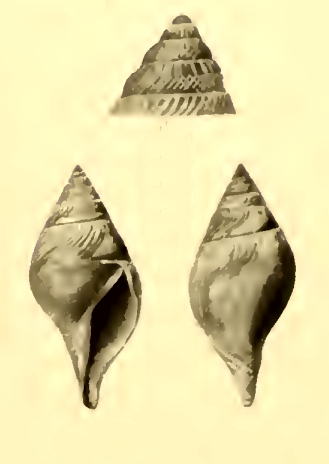
- Original image of the shell and protoconch of Xanthodaphne pyriformis

Scientific classification
- Kingdom: Animalia
- Phylum: Mollusca
- Class: Gastropoda
- Subclass: Caenogastropoda
- Order: Neogastropoda
- Superfamily: Conoidea
- Family: Raphitomidae
- Genus: Xanthodaphne
- Species: X. pyriformis

Binomial name
- Xanthodaphne pyriformis (Schepman, 1913)

Synonyms
- Pleurotomella pyriformis Schepman, 1913

= Xanthodaphne pyriformis =

Species of gastropod

Xanthodaphne pyriformis is a species of sea snail, a marine gastropod mollusk in the family Raphitomidae.

== Description ==
The length of the shell attains 7.5 mm, its diameter 3.75 mm.

(Original description) The pyriform, ivory-white, thin, fragile shell has an acute spire. It contains 8 whorls 8, of which 4 form a light-brown protoconch. They are convex, with remote riblets on the upper part, oblique, and with less stronger ones, which cross each other, in the lower part. The subsequent whorls are scarcely convex, with only a trace of being divided into two parts on the upper two. However, the upper part is marked with elegantly curved, conspicuous riblets, being slightly bead-like just below the suture, on a narrow, infrasutural spiral. The lower part of the body whorlshows numerous, faint, spiral striae, becoming stronger on the rather long, slender siphonal canal. Moreover the lower whorls display elegantly waved growth-lines. The aperture is oval, wnth a sharp angle above and a narrow gutter-like siphonal canal below, which is directed to the right. The peristome is much broken and probably has a wide, shallow sinus above. The columellar margin shows a very thin layer of enamel, slightly stronger along the siphonal canal.
