= Austrobela =

Scientific classification
- Kingdom: Animalia
- Phylum: Mollusca
- Class: Gastropoda
- Subclass: Caenogastropoda
- Order: Neogastropoda
- Superfamily: Conoidea
- Family: Raphitomidae
- Genus: Austrobela; Criscione, Hallan, Puillandre & Fedosov, 2020

Type species
- Austrobela rufa Criscione, Hallan, Puillandre & Fedosov, 2020

Genus of gastropods

Austrobela is a genus of sea snails, marine gastropod mollusks in the family Raphitomidae.

== Species ==
- Austrobela fulvotincta (Dautzenberg & H. Fischer, 1896)
- Austrobela gypsata (R. B. Watson, 1881)
- Austrobela micraulax (Sysoev, 1997)
- Austrobela obliquicostata Criscione, Hallan, Puillandre & Fedosov, 2021
- Austrobela procera (Sysoev & Bouchet, 2001)
- Austrobela pyrrhogramma (Dautzenberg & H. Fischer, 1896)
- Austrobela pyrropelex (Barnard, 1963)
- Austrobela regia Criscione, Hallan, Puillandre & Fedosov, 2021
- Austrobela rufa Criscione, Hallan, Puillandre & Fedosov, 2020
- Austrobela sagitta Criscione, Hallan, Puillandre & Fedosov, 2021
- Austrobela xanthias (R. B. Watson, 1886)
