= Xanthodaphne tropica =

Scientific classification
- Kingdom: Animalia
- Phylum: Mollusca
- Class: Gastropoda
- Subclass: Caenogastropoda
- Order: Neogastropoda
- Superfamily: Conoidea
- Family: Raphitomidae
- Genus: Xanthodaphne
- Species: X. tropica

Binomial name
- Xanthodaphne tropica Sysoev & Ivanov, 1985

Species of gastropod

Xanthodaphne tropica is a species of sea snail, a marine gastropod mollusk in the family Raphitomidae.

== Distribution ==
This marine species was found on the Nazca Ridge in the Southeast Pacific.
