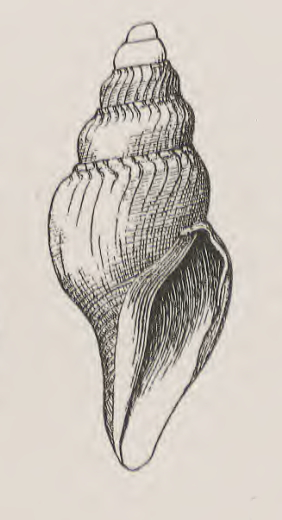
- Original image of a shell of Xanthodaphne encella

Scientific classification
- Kingdom: Animalia
- Phylum: Mollusca
- Class: Gastropoda
- Subclass: Caenogastropoda
- Order: Neogastropoda
- Superfamily: Conoidea
- Family: Raphitomidae
- Genus: Xanthodaphne
- Species: X. encella

Binomial name
- Xanthodaphne encella (Dall, 1908)

Synonyms
- Mangilia encella Dall, 1908

= Xanthodaphne encella =

Species of gastropod

Xanthodaphne encella is a species of sea snail, a marine gastropod mollusk in the family Raphitomidae.

== Description ==
The length of the shell attains 11 mm.

(Original description) The small, white shell has a translucent thin periostracum and about five whorls (the protoconch eroded). The spire is slightly longer than the aperture. The early whorls are rounded with about fifteen slender, low, arcuate, protractive, axial riblets which are obsolete on the body whorl. The suture is distinct, marginate, where the riblets are conspicuous as at the periphery and continued to the suture in front. There are also fine, well-marked lines of growth, all crossed by close-set, low, spiral threads which become coarser and slightly more distinct on the siphonal canal. The anal sulcus is deep, wide and rounded. The outer lip in front of it is strongly protractive, thin and simple. The body and the columella show a thin wash of callus. The columella is straight and attenuated in front. The aperture is narrow and lunate. The siphonal canal is short, rather wide and not recurved.

== Distribution ==
This marine species occurs off Cocos Island, Pacific Costa Rica.
