= Xanthodaphne araneosa =

Scientific classification
- Kingdom: Animalia
- Phylum: Mollusca
- Class: Gastropoda
- Subclass: Caenogastropoda
- Order: Neogastropoda
- Superfamily: Conoidea
- Family: Raphitomidae
- Genus: Xanthodaphne
- Species: X. araneosa

Binomial name
- Xanthodaphne araneosa (Watson, 1881)

Synonyms
- Clathurella araneosa Tryon, 1884; Pleurotoma (Defrancia) araneosa Watson, 1881; Pleurotomella araneosa (R. B. Watson, 1881)

Species of gastropod

Xanthodaphne araneosa is a species of sea snail in the family Raphitomidae.

== Description ==
X. araneosa are very small sea snails, with shell lengths reaching up to 5.6 mm. The shell is yellowish, without gloss, minutely ribbed, and faintly spiraled. The spiral has a small, broad, scalar, sharp-pointed spire with a slightly swollen body whorl and rounded base, produced into a square, prominent, and one-sided snout. The protoconch is buff in color.

Sculpture longitudinal structure is exceedingly fine, showing faint, microscopic scratches in the line of growth. At distances of about 1/100 of an inch apart, these raise into small, sharpish, round-topped riblets, which run continuously from the suture to the snout, though on the base and below it they become smaller. On primitive whorls, these are of course less marked and more close set. In the intervals of the larger riblets, one or two fainter ones occasionally appear.

Below the slightly concave sinus area is an obtuse angulation, accentuated by the slight prominence of the two small spiral threads which lie there. Below this, on the body whorl above the lip corner, there are about 5 other small spirals that are not so prominent. On the lower part of the body and on the base, they are weaker but become stronger again towards the point of the base and on the snout. The intersection of these with the spirals produces a slight spider-web-like appearance (on the property the name of the epithet is based).

The spire is rather short and broad, scalar, and conical. The protoconch consists of 4½ very small, conical, scalar, convex, buff whorls, parted by a deep suture. The first whorl and half are closely spirally striated with about 10-minute threads. These threads, which are at first almost simple, are by degrees more and more fretted by longitudinals, which break up the threads into minute tubercles. Toward the end of the second whorl longitudinal and oblique bars appear somewhat vaguely and confusedly. But presently, the distinct arrangement appears of short little bars above and a network on the lower part of the whorls. The shell contains 7½ whorls in all, but the shell is very likely hardly full-grown. They are almost horizontal above, with a flat or faintly concave sinus-area, slightly angulated at the shoulder, and below this cylindrical or a very little convex to the lower suture. The last is rather short, a little tumid, with a long pillar-line on the left side, and a small square prominent snout on the right. The suture is very slight in consequence of the up lap of the whorls at their junction, but of course, strongly marked by the angulation of the line of junction. The aperture is oblong, triangularly pointed above, and ending in a very square broadish siphonal canal below. The outer lip is flatly arched, with a slight angulation below the sinus-area and a marked pinch-in where it turns to form the siphonal canal. Its edge-line is very straight and scarcely prominent, but has a high shoulder above, between which and the body lies the deepish, rounded, and open-mouthed sinus. The inner lip is very thin and narrow, and dying out very early on the scarcely oblique, twisted, sharp columella-edge. Its line across the body is very short and convex but is very concave at its junction with the long, scarcely oblique columella.

== Distribution ==
The holotype of this was found off St. Thomas, Caribbean Sea; also, off Puerto Rico and the Virgin Islands.
