= Xanthodaphne pachia =

Scientific classification
- Kingdom: Animalia
- Phylum: Mollusca
- Class: Gastropoda
- Subclass: Caenogastropoda
- Order: Neogastropoda
- Superfamily: Conoidea
- Family: Raphitomidae
- Genus: Xanthodaphne
- Species: X. pachia

Binomial name
- Xanthodaphne pachia (Watson, 1881)

Synonyms
- Pleurotoma (Defrancia) pachia Watson, 1881; Pleurotomella pachia (R. B. Watson, 1881)

Species of gastropod

Xanthodaphne pachia is a species of sea snail, a marine gastropod mollusk in the family Raphitomidae.

== Description ==
The length of the shell attains 12 mm.

(Original description) The ovate, white shell is smooth with rounded outlines. It has a rather high, small, and sharp-pointed protoconch, a swollen body whorl, and a rounded base produced into a small, broad, one-sided snout.

Sculpture. Longitudinals: there are only very fine hairlike lines of growth, of which here and there at regular intervals one becomes much more strongly marked than the others. Spirals: the whole surface is sparsely scored with very shallow, scratched-out, narrow furrows, parted by flat intervals of from two to six times their breadth. In the sinus area they are a little closer than elsewhere. On the snout they gradually broaden till their intervals assume the form of slight rounded threads.

The colour of the shell is like a shaving of ivory, from its thinness, gloss, and colour. The protoconch is buff.

The spire is conical. The protoconch consists of 4 very small, conical, scarcely convex, buff whorls, the upper part of which bears straight little bars, and the lower part is minutely reticulated. Below the buff-coloured surface the shell is porcellaneous. The shell contains 9 whorls in all, slightly straight and sloping below the suture, convexly rounded above, cylindrical below. The body whorl is a little tumid, with a rounded base produced into a short, broad, lopsided snout. The suture is very slight, as the inferior whorl laps up on the one above it, but it is defined by the curve of the whorls. The aperture is oval, pointed above. There is scarcely any siphonal canal below. The outer lip is very thin, a little contracted above, and patulous below. Its curve is somewhat flattened about the periphery. Its edge forms a very regular curve with a slight shoulder above, between which and the body lies the broad, shallow, rounded sinus. The inner lip is a thin narrow glaze which very soon dies out on the oblique, twisted, fine edge of the short conical columella, beyond whose point the front of the shell advances a good deal. The junction of the columella and the body is concave.

== Distribution ==
This marine species occurs off Puerto Rico and St Thomas
