= Xanthodaphne contarinii =

Scientific classification
- Kingdom: Animalia
- Phylum: Mollusca
- Class: Gastropoda
- Subclass: Caenogastropoda
- Order: Neogastropoda
- Superfamily: Conoidea
- Family: Raphitomidae
- Genus: Xanthodaphne
- Species: X. contarinii

Binomial name
- Xanthodaphne contarinii Petracci, Bongiardino, Della Bella & Tabanelli, 2019

Extinct species of gastropod

Xanthodaphne contarinii is an extinct species of sea snail, a marine gastropod mollusk in the family Raphitomidae.

== Distribution ==
Fossils of this marine species were found in Pliocene strata of Emilia-Romagna, Italy.
