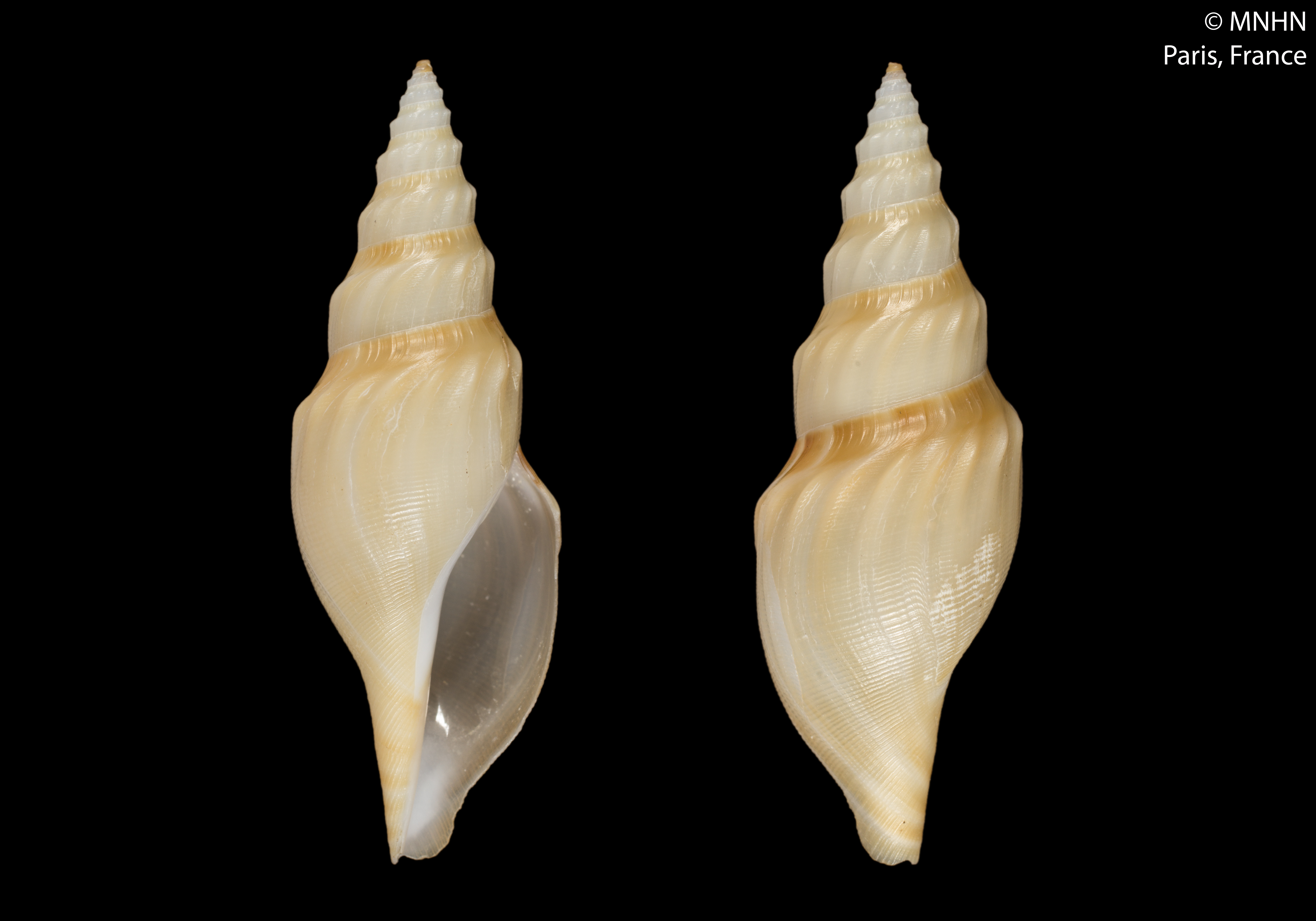
- Shell of Austrobela procera (holotype at MNHN, Paris)

Scientific classification
- Kingdom: Animalia
- Phylum: Mollusca
- Class: Gastropoda
- Subclass: Caenogastropoda
- Order: Neogastropoda
- Superfamily: Conoidea
- Family: Raphitomidae
- Genus: Austrobela
- Species: A. procera

Binomial name
- Austrobela procera Sysoev & Bouchet, 2001

Synonyms
- Gymnobela procera Sysoev & Bouchet, 2001 (original combination)

= Austrobela procera =

Species of gastropod

Austrobela procera is a species of sea snail, a marine gastropod mollusk in the family Raphitomidae.

== Description ==
The length of the shell attains 32 mm.

== Distribution ==
This marine species occurs at the Loyalty Ridge off New Caledonia.
