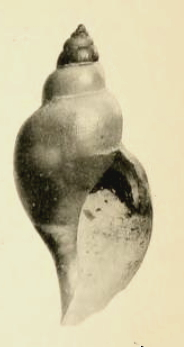
- Original image of a shell of Xanthodaphne dalmasi

Scientific classification
- Kingdom: Animalia
- Phylum: Mollusca
- Class: Gastropoda
- Subclass: Caenogastropoda
- Order: Neogastropoda
- Superfamily: Conoidea
- Family: Raphitomidae
- Genus: Xanthodaphne
- Species: X. dalmasi

Binomial name
- Xanthodaphne dalmasi (Dautzenberg & Fischer, 1897)

Synonyms
- Pleurotoma dalmasi Dautzenberg & Fischer, 1897

= Xanthodaphne dalmasi =

Species of gastropod

Xanthodaphne dalmasi is a species of sea snail, a marine gastropod mollusk in the family Raphitomidae.

Subspecies: Xanthodaphne dalmasi nuda Nordsieck, 1973

== Description ==
The length of the shell attains 9.4 mm, its diameter 4.2 mm.

(Original description in French) The slender, fragile shell has a fusiform shape. The spire consists of seven convex whorls separated by a rather well-marked suture. The protoconch consists of 5 whorls. The first is finely reticulated by delicate decurrent cords and by other more insignificant longitudinal ones. The others show below the suture a large area decorated with oblique and not prominent ribs and very recurring fine streaks. Below this area they are reticulated. They are followed by two more or less subangular whorls at the lower limit of the infrasutural zone which occupies a little less than a third of the height of the whorl. This area is decorated with regular and tightly arched lines of growth, more accentuated near the suture, and decurrent, very weak striae. The rest of the whorls are decorated with numerous and irregular growth lines and very shallow and slightly wavy decurrent ribs. The body whorl measures slightly over 3/4 of the total height. The broad aperture is elongatedly oval and angular at the top. The short siphonal canal is wide open. The columella is slightly arcuated. It is twisted at the base and acuminate at the end. The outer lip is slightly curved and deeply indented.

== Distribution ==
This marine species occurs off the Azores.
