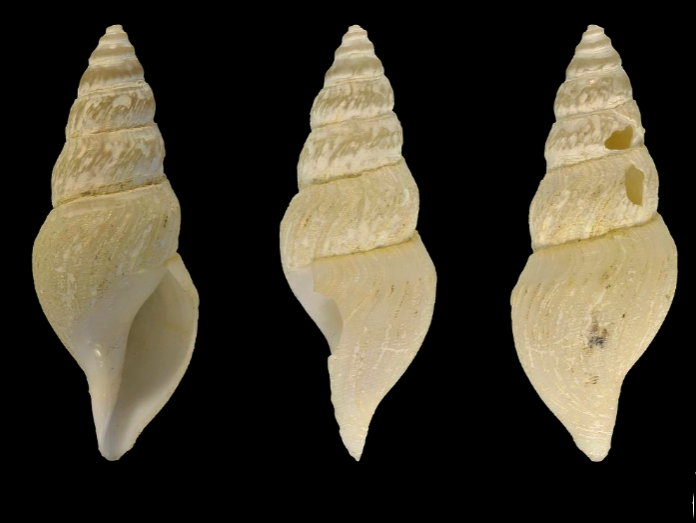
- Shell of Xanthodaphne suffusa (holotype at the Smithsonian Institution)

Scientific classification
- Kingdom: Animalia
- Phylum: Mollusca
- Class: Gastropoda
- Subclass: Caenogastropoda
- Order: Neogastropoda
- Superfamily: Conoidea
- Family: Raphitomidae
- Genus: Xanthodaphne
- Species: X. suffusa

Binomial name
- Xanthodaphne suffusa (Dall, 1890)

Synonyms
- Mangilia suffusa Dall, 1890; Pleurotomella suffusa Dall, 1890 (original combination)

= Xanthodaphne suffusa =

Species of gastropod

Xanthodaphne suffusa is a species of sea snail, a marine gastropod mollusk in the family Raphitomidae.

== Description ==
The length of the shell attains 31.5 mm, its diameter 11.5 mm.

(Original description) The small, slender shell is fusiform. The columella is suffused with yellowish pink, the exterior white, with a thin, pale epidermis. The shell contains seven or eight whorls, without counting the protoconch. The specimen is somewhat eroded on the upper whorls, with indications of a shoulder or carina on the three whorls following the protoconch. The suture is slightly irregular, appressed, distinct, not channeled. The spiral sculpture consists of fine threads, alternately larger and smaller, pretty uniform over the whole surface, with narrower interspaces. This sculpture is fainter on the sutural side of the fasciole. The transverse sculpture consists of faint, irregular, sharp edged plications, strongest near the suture and on the obscure angle just in front of the fasciole, elsewhere nearly obsolete. The fasciole is very slightly impressed. The anal notch is very shallow. The aperture is long, narrow and pointed behind. The outer lip is sharp and arched forward. The siphonal canal is distinct and wide. The columella is rosy, attenuated in front. The axis is almost pervious. The body shows a thin glaze over a slightly excavated space. Theprotoconch is lost.

== Distribution ==
This marine species was found off San Cristobal Island, NW of, Galapagos Islands, Ecuador, South Pacific Ocean at a depth of 1485 m.
