= Austrobela pyrropelex =

Scientific classification
- Kingdom: Animalia
- Phylum: Mollusca
- Class: Gastropoda
- Subclass: Caenogastropoda
- Order: Neogastropoda
- Superfamily: Conoidea
- Family: Raphitomidae
- Genus: Austrobela
- Species: A. pyrropelex

Binomial name
- Austrobela pyrropelex (Barnard, 1963)

Synonyms
- Austrobela levis Criscione, Hallan, Puillandre & Fedosov, 2021 junior subjective synonym; Surcula dissimilis Barnard, K.H., 1958; Typhlosyrinx pyrropelex Barnard, 1963; Xanthodaphne pyrropelex (Barnard, 1963) · unaccepted > superseded combination

Species of gastropod

Austrobela pyrropelex is a species of sea snail, a marine gastropod mollusk in the family Raphitomidae.

== Distribution ==
This marine species occurs off the Cape Province, South Africa
