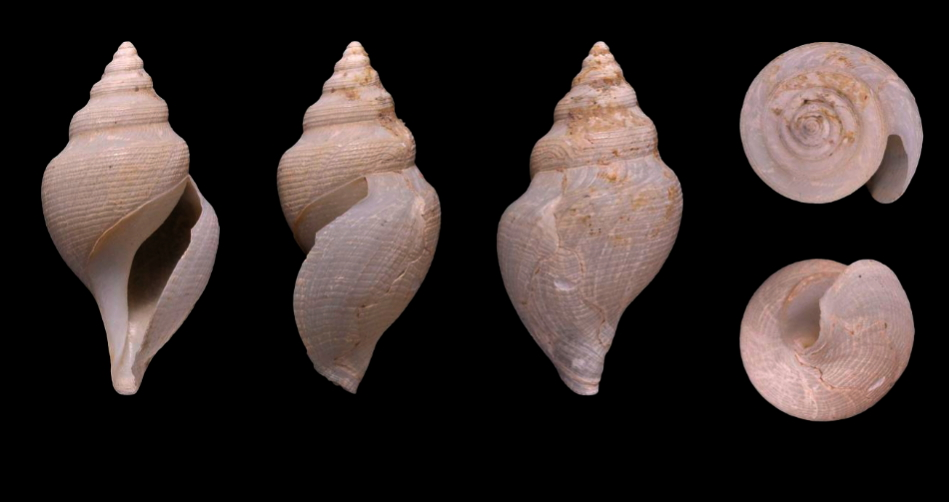
- Shell and protoconch of Pueridaphne bruneri (holotype at the Smithsonian Institution)

Scientific classification
- Kingdom: Animalia
- Phylum: Mollusca
- Class: Gastropoda
- Subclass: Caenogastropoda
- Order: Neogastropoda
- Superfamily: Conoidea
- Family: Raphitomidae
- Genus: Pueridaphne
- Species: P. bruneri

Binomial name
- Pueridaphne bruneri (Verrill & S. Smith [in Verrill], 1884)

Synonyms
- Pleurotomella bruneri Verrill, 1884; Pueridaphne cirrisulcata Criscione, Hallan, Puillandre & Fedosov, 2020 junior subjective synonym; Xanthodaphne bruneri (A. E. Verrill & S. Smith, 1884) superseded combination

= Pueridaphne bruneri =

Species of gastropod

Pueridaphne bruneri is a species of sea snail, a marine gastropod mollusc in the family Raphitomidae.

== Description ==
The length of the shell attains 22 mm, its diameter 11 mm.

(Original description) The stout-fusiform shell has a rather short, regularly tapered spire, a broad and deep posterior sinus, and a very short and wide siphonal canal. It contains seven, moderately convex whorls with a wide, concave subsutural band, which is covered with regular, strongly receding, raised lines, but destitute of spiral sculpture. The shoulder is rather prominent where the concave band joins the convexity of the whorl. The rest of the surface is covered with conspicuous, raised, obtuse, unequal revolving cinguli, separated by deep interspaces of nearly the same breadth, on the spire. On the anterior part of the body whorl the cinguli become broader and fatter, and separated by narrower grooves, which are covered by numerous rather close, raised, longitudinal lines, or lines of growth, which are less conspicuous where they cross the cinguli. This arrangement produces a finely cancellated structure, in which the spiral lines are much more distinct than the others. The aperture is narrow-ovate, continuing backward in a broad and deep sinus next the body whorl. The outer lip is thin and sharp, and projects obliquely forward in a broad curve. The siphonal canal is scarcely differentiated from the rest of the aperture. It is short and rather broad, and nearly straight. The columella is straight, with a sinuous inner margin. The inner lip extends forward on the body whorl in a broad, regular curve, defined by a thin layer of enamel. The operculum is apparently wanting. The whorls in the protoconch are eroded, but are small, regularly spiral, and without any strongly marked sculpture. The color is grayish white, with a pale yellowish green epidermis, which is easily deciduous.

== Distribution ==
The holotype of this marine species was found southeast off the Nantucket Shoals, Massachusetts, United States, North Atlantic Ocean at a depth of 3718 m.
