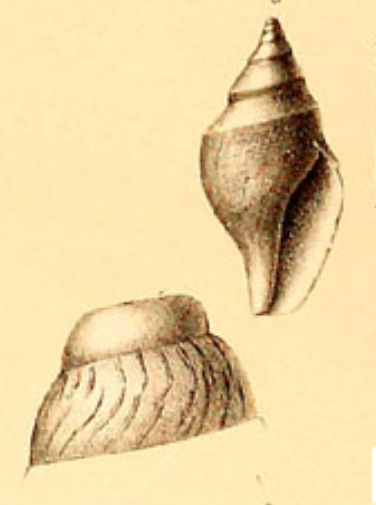
- Original image of the shell and protoconch of Austrobela xanthias

Scientific classification
- Kingdom: Animalia
- Phylum: Mollusca
- Class: Gastropoda
- Subclass: Caenogastropoda
- Order: Neogastropoda
- Superfamily: Conoidea
- Family: Raphitomidae
- Genus: Austrobela
- Species: A. xanthias

Binomial name
- Austrobela xanthias (R.B. Watson, 1886)

Synonyms
- Pleurotoma (Thesbia) xanthias R. B. Watson, 1886 superseded combination; Pleurotoma (Thesbia) xanthias Watson, 1886; Xanthodaphne xanthias (R. B. Watson, 1886)

= Austrobela xanthias =

Species of gastropod

Austrobela xanthias is a species of sea snail, a marine gastropod mollusk in the family Raphitomidae.

== Description ==
The length of the shell attains 19 mm, its diameter 10 mm.

(Original description) The shell is oval, biconical, and a little tumid. The spire is high and conical, the base long and pointed. The surface is smooth and feebly spiralled, and white.

Sculpture : Longitudinals—there are fine hair-like lines of growth, which are slightly puckered below the suture. Spirals—there is a blunt carination in the middle of the whorls, below which the surface is scored with flat threads parted by slight irregular lines. Above the keel on the shoulder these spirals are wholly absent.

The colour of the shell is white, with a glossy surface.

The spire high and conical. The protoconch has probably 3 to 3½ whorls, but the extreme tip is broken and only 2 remain. They are yellow and conical, and are microscopically scored by minute narrow raised lines which are straight above, but below slope very obliquely to the left. There are 4½ whorls below the apical nucleus. They are feebly angulated in the middle. The body whorl is large, tumid, and has a swollen base prolonged into a broad triangular lop-sided snout, which is not at all emarginate in front. The suture is very slight indeed, but distinct. The aperture is narrowly oblong, pointed above, and having no siphonal canal in front. The outer lip is thin, flatly arched, with a deep broad sinus which lies up at the very suture, and with no shelf at the insertion. Below the sinus the edge of the lip sweeps forward in a great wing-like curve. There is a mere thin glaze on the body of the inner lip. Its line is barely convex on the body, subangulatedly concave at its junction with the columella, which is longish, oblique to the left, and slightly truncate at the point.

== Distribution ==
This marine species is endemic to New Zealand and occurs off North Island.
