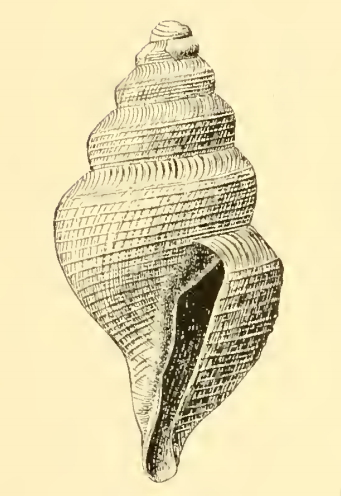
- Original image of a shell of Pueridaphne agonia

Scientific classification
- Kingdom: Animalia
- Phylum: Mollusca
- Class: Gastropoda
- Subclass: Caenogastropoda
- Order: Neogastropoda
- Superfamily: Conoidea
- Family: Raphitomidae
- Genus: Pueridaphne
- Species: P. agonia

Binomial name
- Pueridaphne agonia (Dall, 1890)

Synonyms
- Mangilia agonia Dall, 1890 (original name); Pleurotomella (Gymnobela) agonia Dall, 1890; Xanthodaphne agonia (Dall, 1890) superseded combination

= Pueridaphne agonia =

Species of gastropod

Pueridaphne agonia is a species of sea snail, a marine gastropod mollusk in the family Raphitomidae.

== Description ==
The length of the shell attains 16 mm, its diameter 8 mm.

(Original description) The small, thin shell is bright yellow-brown. It contains six full and rounded whorls. The protoconch is lost, but without doubt of the Sinusigera type. The spiral sculpture in front of the fasciole consists of numerous sharp elevated threads with wider interspaces, between each pair of which, except on the siphonal canal, are one or two smaller intercalary threads. On the fasciole there are only a few comparatively faint threads, which do not rise above the transverse sculpture, while on the body the spiral sculpture is predominant though minutely undulated by the other. The transverse sculpture is composed of numerous fine, rounded, somewhat elevated threads with wider interspaces, forming a series of elegant concavely arched ripples on the anal fasciole, beyond which they become fainter, closer, and obscure, being over-ridden by the spirals which they minutely undulate. The fasciole is slightly impressed and extends to the suture, which is distinct but not channeled. The notch is shallow and gently rounded. The outer lip is arched forward and sharp. The body is covered with a thin glaze, in the aperture. The columella is thin, twisted, impervious. The siphonal canal is short and distinct.

== Distribution ==
This marine species was found off the Galapagos Islands.
