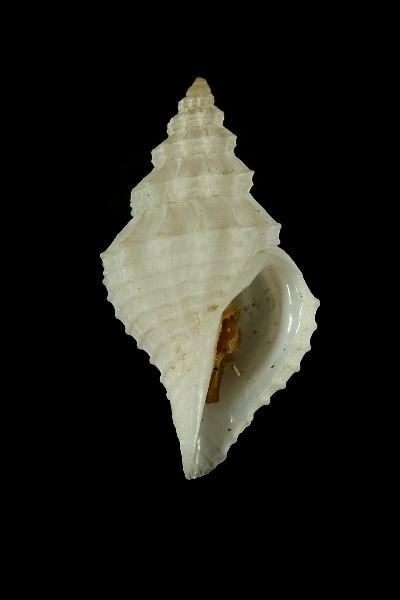
- Shell of a species of Clinura (specimen in the MNHN, Paris)

Scientific classification
- Kingdom: Animalia
- Phylum: Mollusca
- Class: Gastropoda
- Subclass: Caenogastropoda
- Order: Neogastropoda
- Superfamily: Conoidea
- Family: Raphitomidae
- Genus: Clinura; Bellardi, 1875

Type species
- Clinura calliope Brocchi, 1814

= Clinura =

Genus of gastropods

Clinura is a genus of sea snails, marine gastropod mollusks in the family Raphitomidae.

This genus was only known from fossils from the Cenozoic era until 1997 when Sysoev found a specimen of Clinura vitrea off the Taninbar Islands, Indonesia.

== Species ==
Species within the genus Clinura include:

- † Clinura calliope Brocchi, G.B., 1814
- † Clinura circumfossa (Koenen, 1872)
- † Clinura controversa Jan
- † Clinura generosa (Marwick, 1931)
- † Clinura sabatorium Bellardi, 1875
- † Clinura sopronensis Hoernes & Auinger, 1879
- † Clinura subtrochlearis Friedberg, 1912
- † Clinura trochlearis Hoernes, 1856
- Clinura vitrea Sysoev, 1997

Species brought into synonymy

- † Clinura elegantissima (Foresti, 1868): synonym of Teretia elegantissima (Forresti, 1868)
- Clinura hosoi (Okutani, 1964): synonym of Crassispira hosoi (Okutani, 1964)
- Clinura monochorda Dall, 1908: synonym of Anticlinura monochorda (Dall, 1908) (original combination)
- Clinura peruviana Dall, 1908: synonym of Anticlinura peruviana (Dall, 1908) (original combination)
