= Azorilla =

Scientific classification
- Kingdom: Animalia
- Phylum: Mollusca
- Class: Gastropoda
- Subclass: Caenogastropoda
- Order: Neogastropoda
- Superfamily: Conoidea
- Family: Raphitomidae
- Genus: Azorilla

Type species
- Pleurotoma megalembryon Dautzenberg & H. Fischer, 1896

Species
- See text

Genus of gastropods

Azorilla is a small genus of sea snails, marine gastropod mollusks in the family Raphitomidae.

This genus has become a synonym of Teretia Norman, 1888.

== Species ==
Species brought into synonymy

- Azorilla lottae (Verrill, 1885): synonym of Pleurotomella lottae A. E. Verrill, 1885
- Azorilla megalembryon (Dautzenberg & H. Fischer, 1896): synonym of Teretia megalembryon (Dautzenberg & Fischer, 1896)
