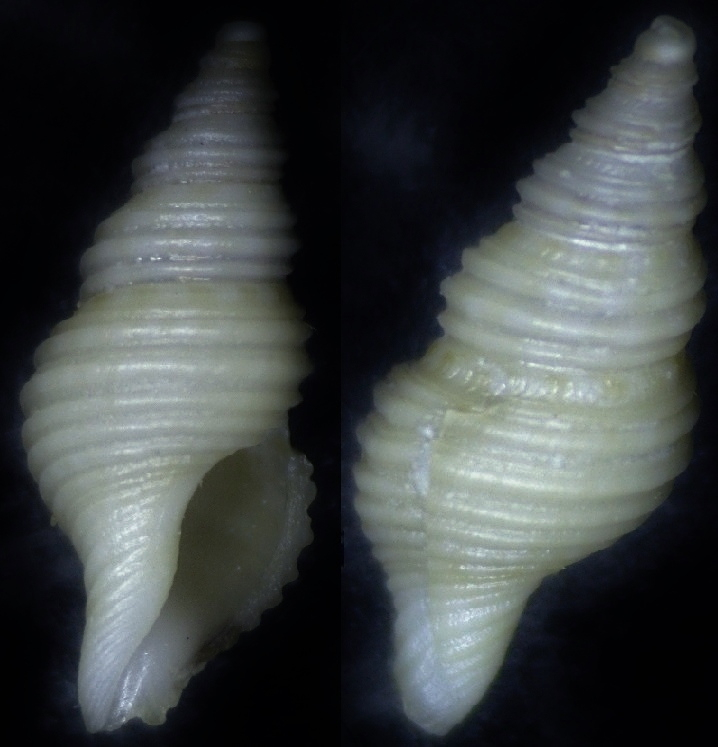
- Shell of Teretia teres

Scientific classification
- Kingdom: Animalia
- Phylum: Mollusca
- Class: Gastropoda
- Subclass: Caenogastropoda
- Order: Neogastropoda
- Superfamily: Conoidea
- Family: Raphitomidae
- Genus: Teretia
- Species: T. teres

Binomial name
- Teretia teres (Reeve, 1844)

Synonyms
- Fusus laviae Calcara, 1845; Mangelia teres (Forbes, 1844); Mangelia teres var. alba Jeffreys, 1859; Pleurotoma borealis Lovén, 1846; Pleurotoma fusiformis Requien, 1848 (dubious synonym); Pleurotoma minuta var. polyzonata Brugnone, 1862; Pleurotoma teres Forbes, 1844; Teretia anceps Auct. non Eichwald, 1830; Teretia borealis Lovén, 1846; Teretia teres Jeffreys, 1859; Teretia teres var. soluta Marshall, 1912

= Teretia teres =

Species of gastropod

Teretia teres is a species of sea snail, a marine gastropod mollusk in the family Raphitomidae.

== Taxonomy ==
Considered as specifically distinct from Teretia anceps (Eichwald, 1830), a Miocene fossil species, by Bouchet & Warén (1980).

== Description ==
Shell up to 12 mm high, fusiform with acute spire and body whorl occupying about 60% of the total height. Protoconch small, with 4 convex whorls and a sculpture of oblique threads forming a delicate reticulate pattern. Teleoconch with a sculpture of regular, high spiral cords; there are three cords on the first teleoconch whorl and the number increases by intercalation of additional cords in the later whorls. Interspaces of cord filled wit delicate raised lines, parallel to growth lines. Body whorl markedly constricted around the siphonal canal. Aperture lanceolate, with outer lip simple and fragile, curved in lateral view and forming a very deep notch immediately beneath the suture. Protoconch dark brown, teleoconch beige, sometimes with darker suubsutural blotches or flames.

== Distribution ==
This species occurs in the Northern Atlantic Ocean and in the Mediterranean Sea.
