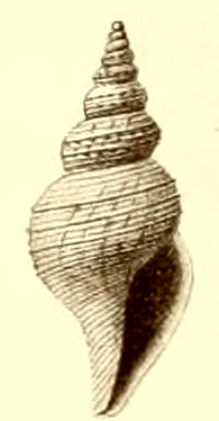
- Original image of a shell of † Teretia multicingula

Scientific classification
- Kingdom: Animalia
- Phylum: Mollusca
- Class: Gastropoda
- Subclass: Caenogastropoda
- Order: Neogastropoda
- Superfamily: Conoidea
- Family: Raphitomidae
- Genus: Teretia
- Species: T. multicingula

Binomial name
- Teretia multicingula (Seguenza, 1880)

Synonyms
- † Homotoma multicingula Seguenza, 1880

= Teretia multicingula =

Extinct species of gastropod

Teretia multicingula is an extinct species of sea snail, a marine gastropod mollusk in the family Raphitomidae.

== Description ==
The length of the shell attains 15 mm, its diameter 6 mm.

(Original description in Italian) This is also a species close to Teretia anceps from which it differs by the shape and the course of the cinguli, which are very numerous, not very prominent, and very close so that the interstices become minimal. The convex whorls have deep sutures.

== Distribution ==
Fossils of this marine species were found in Pliocene strata in Calabria, Italy
