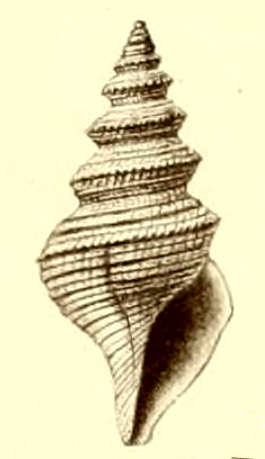
- Original image of a shell of † Teretia cincta

Scientific classification
- Kingdom: Animalia
- Phylum: Mollusca
- Class: Gastropoda
- Subclass: Caenogastropoda
- Order: Neogastropoda
- Superfamily: Conoidea
- Family: Raphitomidae
- Genus: Teretia
- Species: T. cincta

Binomial name
- Teretia cincta (Seguenza, 1880)

Synonyms
- † Homotoma cincta Seguenza, 1880

= Teretia cincta =

Extinct species of gastropod

Teretia cincta is an extinct species of sea snail, a marine gastropod mollusk in the family Raphitomidae.

== Description ==
The length of the shell attains 10.6 mm, its diameter 5 mm.

(Original description in Italian) This species is very similar to Teretia anceps, but it must be distinguished by a less delicate shape, because the whorls are shorter and therefore relatively wider. The cinguli are thinner and more protruding. The interstices are much wider.

== Distribution ==
Fossils of this marine species were found in Pliocene strata in Calabria, Italy
