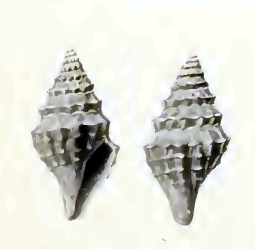
- Original image of a shell of Anticlinura biconica

Scientific classification
- Kingdom: Animalia
- Phylum: Mollusca
- Class: Gastropoda
- Subclass: Caenogastropoda
- Order: Neogastropoda
- Superfamily: Conoidea
- Family: Mangeliidae
- Genus: Anticlinura
- Species: A. biconica

Binomial name
- Anticlinura biconica (Schepman, 1913)

Synonyms
- Surcula biconica Schepman, 1913 (original combination)

= Anticlinura biconica =

Species of gastropod

Anticlinura biconica is a species of sea snail, a marine gastropod mollusk in the family Mangeliidae.

== Description ==
The length of the shell attains 8¾ mm, its diameter 4½ mm.

(Original description) The rather thin, white shell has a biconical shape with a short siphonal canal. It contains 8 whorls, of which about 2 form a convexly whorled protoconch, which seems to be at first smooth, the second whorl being obliquely costulate. The whorls of the teleoconch are separated by a conspicuous, distinctly waved suture, angular, excavated above. Their sculpture shows rather narrow axial ribs, 14 in number on the body whorl, scarcely indicated in excavation. The whorls are divided by a strong keel, consisting of depressed tubercles, forming the upper part of ribs, at the base of the excavation. Moreover, there are 3 remote spirals on the scarcely contracted body whorl, which, in crossing the ribs, make them beaded, and 2 or 3 very faint, plain ones on the siphonal canal. In the upper whorls the uppermost of these lirae is nearly covered by the suture and causes the conspicuous waves. Otherwise the shell is nearly smooth, but for very fine growth lines, more conspicuous in the excavation. The aperture is oblong, angular above, with a short open siphonal canal below. The peristome is thin, broken, according to growth lines with a shallow sinus above, then slightly protracted. Thecolumellar margin is nearly straight, with a thin layer of enamel.

== Distribution ==
This species occurs in the Banda Sea, Indonesia
