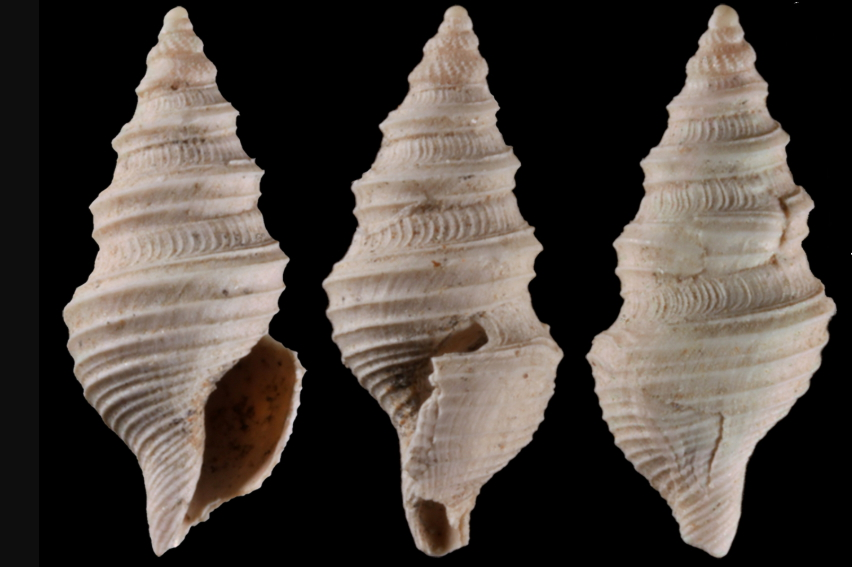
- Original image of a shell of Teretia oligocaenica (holotype at MNHN, Paris)

Scientific classification
- Kingdom: Animalia
- Phylum: Mollusca
- Class: Gastropoda
- Subclass: Caenogastropoda
- Order: Neogastropoda
- Superfamily: Conoidea
- Family: Raphitomidae
- Genus: Teretia
- Species: †T. oligocaenica

Binomial name
- †Teretia oligocaenica Lozouet, 2017

= Teretia oligocaenica =

Extinct species of gastropod

Teretia oligocaenica is an extinct species of sea snail, a marine gastropod mollusk in the family Raphitomidae.

== Distribution ==
Fossils of this marine species were found in Upper Oligocene strata in Aquitaine, France.
