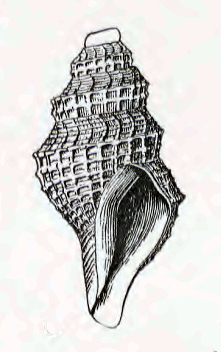
- Original image of a shell of Anticlinura serilla

Scientific classification
- Kingdom: Animalia
- Phylum: Mollusca
- Class: Gastropoda
- Subclass: Caenogastropoda
- Order: Neogastropoda
- Superfamily: Conoidea
- Family: Mangeliidae
- Genus: Anticlinura
- Species: A. serilla

Binomial name
- Anticlinura serilla (W. H. Dall, 1908)

Synonyms
- Gemmula serilla Dall, 1908 (original combination)

= Anticlinura serilla =

Species of gastropod

Anticlinura serilla is a species of sea snail, a marine gastropod mollusk in the family Mangeliidae.

== Description ==
The length of the shell attains 8.3 mm, its diameter is 4 mm.

(Original description) The small, fusiform shell is sharply sculptured. Its color is white with an olivaceous periostracum. it contains about four whorls exclusive of the decollate apex. The suture is distinct and not appressed. The whorl in front of it descends flatly to a nearly peripheral keel, the flattened portion corresponding to the anal fasciole. The fasciole is spirally sculptured by four or live very fine, equidistant, simple, similar threads, crossed by (on the body whorl about twenty-five) elevated, sharp, arcuate, lamellar riblets, which are continued over the whorl with wider interspaces to the anterior part of the base. The shoulder keel is minutely duplex, narrow, subspinose where it crosses the ribs, and more prominent than they. In front of it are about twelve strong rounded primary spiral threads, with wider interspaces, each containing a finer intercalary thread, the whole extending to the end of the siphonal canal . The aperture is narrow. The anal sulcus is wide and shallow. The outer lip is sharp and simple. The bodyof the shell is smooth. The columella is straight, obliquely attenuated in front. The siphonal is canal narrow, straight and rather produced.

== Distribution ==
This marine species occurs in the Gulf of Panama, Panama, Pacific Ocean.
