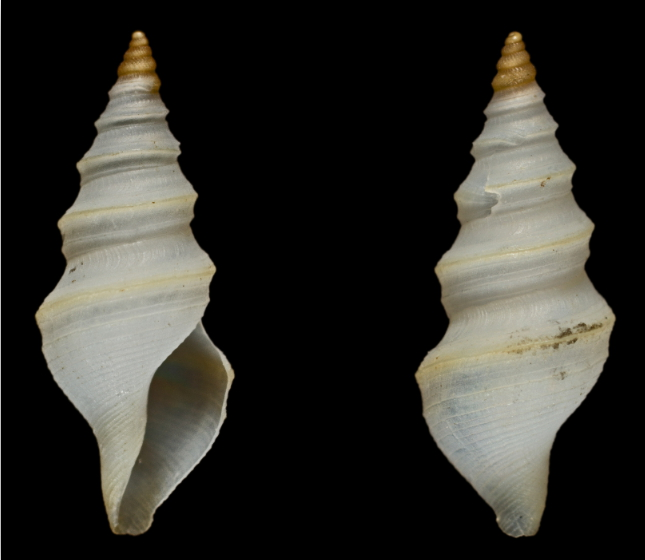
- Shell of Teretia neocaledonica (holotype in the MNHN, Paris)

Scientific classification
- Kingdom: Animalia
- Phylum: Mollusca
- Class: Gastropoda
- Subclass: Caenogastropoda
- Order: Neogastropoda
- Superfamily: Conoidea
- Family: Raphitomidae
- Genus: Teretia
- Species: T. neocaledonica

Binomial name
- Teretia neocaledonica Morassi & Bonfitto, 2015

= Teretia neocaledonica =

Species of gastropod

Teretia neocaledonica is a species of sea snail, a marine gastropod mollusk in the family Raphitomidae.

== Description ==
The length of the shell attains 5.9 mm.

== Distribution ==
This marine species occurs off New Caledonia.
