= Anticlinura atlantica =

Scientific classification
- Kingdom: Animalia
- Phylum: Mollusca
- Class: Gastropoda
- Subclass: Caenogastropoda
- Order: Neogastropoda
- Superfamily: Conoidea
- Family: Mangeliidae
- Genus: Anticlinura
- Species: A. atlantica

Binomial name
- Anticlinura atlantica E. F. García, 2005

Synonyms
- Benthomangelia atlantica (E. F. García, 2005)

Species of sea snail

Anticlinura atlantica (accepted in WoRMS as Benthomangelia atlantica) is a species of sea snail, a marine gastropod mollusk in the family Mangeliidae.

== Description ==
The shell of this species reaches a length of up to 7 mm. It is a benthic and predatory marine gastropod.

== Distribution ==
This marine species occurs in deep waters of the Gulf of Mexico, including off the coasts of Louisiana and Alabama in the United States.
