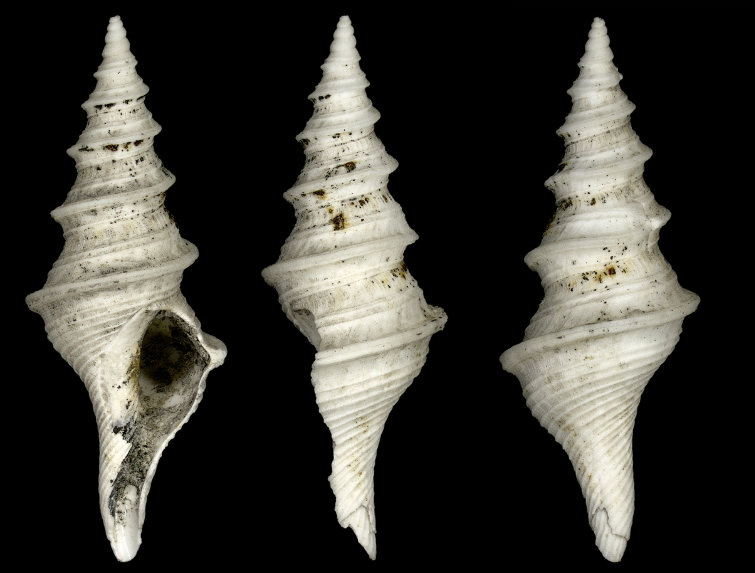
- Shell of Teretia monterosatoi (specimen at MNHN, Paris)

Scientific classification
- Kingdom: Animalia
- Phylum: Mollusca
- Class: Gastropoda
- Subclass: Caenogastropoda
- Order: Neogastropoda
- Superfamily: Conoidea
- Family: Raphitomidae
- Genus: Teretia
- Species: T. monterosatoi

Binomial name
- Teretia monterosatoi (Cipolla, 1914)

Synonyms
- † Daphnella monterosatoi Cipolla, 1914

= Teretia monterosatoi =

Extinct species of gastropod

Teretia monterosatoi is an extinct species of sea snail, a marine gastropod mollusk in the family Raphitomidae.

== Distribution ==
Fossils of this marine species were found in Pliocene strata off Palermo, Italy; and also, in Pliocene strata at the Alpes-Maritimes, France.
