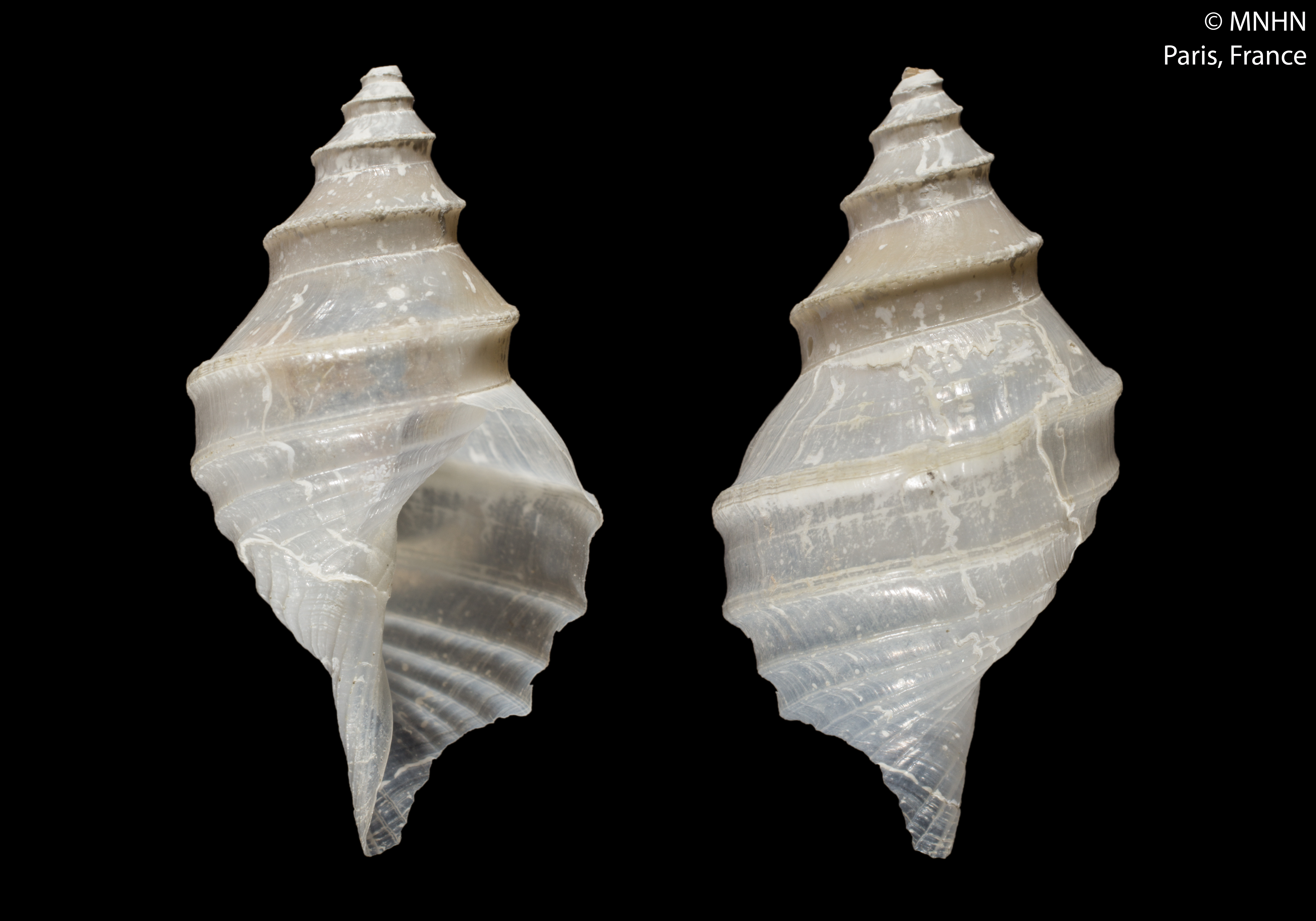
- Shell of Teretiopsis hyalina (holotype at MNHN, Paris)

Scientific classification
- Kingdom: Animalia
- Phylum: Mollusca
- Class: Gastropoda
- Subclass: Caenogastropoda
- Order: Neogastropoda
- Superfamily: Conoidea
- Family: Raphitomidae
- Genus: Teretiopsis
- Species: T. hyalina

Binomial name
- Teretiopsis hyalina Sysoev & Bouchet, 2001

= Teretiopsis hyalina =

Species of gastropod

Teretiopsis hyalina is a species of sea snail, a marine gastropod mollusk in the family Raphitomidae.

== Description ==
The length of the shell attains 25.8 mm.

== Distribution ==
This marine species was found off Wallis Island, Polynesia and off Fiji, Melanesia.
