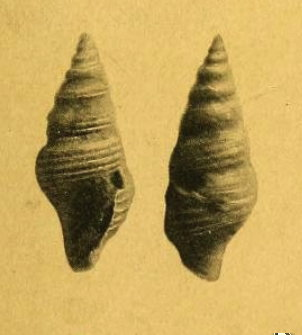
- Original image of a shell of Teretia nana

Scientific classification
- Kingdom: Animalia
- Phylum: Mollusca
- Class: Gastropoda
- Subclass: Caenogastropoda
- Order: Neogastropoda
- Superfamily: Conoidea
- Family: Raphitomidae
- Genus: Teretia
- Species: †T. nana

Binomial name
- †Teretia nana (Hornung, 1920)

Synonyms
- † Daphnella (Teres) nana Hornung, 1920 (basionym)

= Teretia nana =

Extinct species of gastropod

Teretia nana is an extinct species of sea snail, a marine gastropod mollusk in the family Raphitomidae.

== Description ==
The length of the shell attains 4 mm, its diameter 1.5 mm.

(Original description in French) The small shell is turreted with a long, pointed spire. The convex whorls are depressed by a sutural border adorned with very fine arched growth lines. The body whorl is slightly toned down anteriorly. The spiral costulae are close together, round, larger on the ventral part of the body whorl, smaller anteriorly. Two small cords (the posterior one is filamentous) run over the anterior part of the sutural border. The outer lip is frail, wrinkled, arched. The columella is smooth, excavated posteriorly, almost straight at the origin of the siphonal canal, which is short and wide.

== Distribution ==
Fossils of this marine species were found in LowerPliocene strata in Luguria, Italy.
