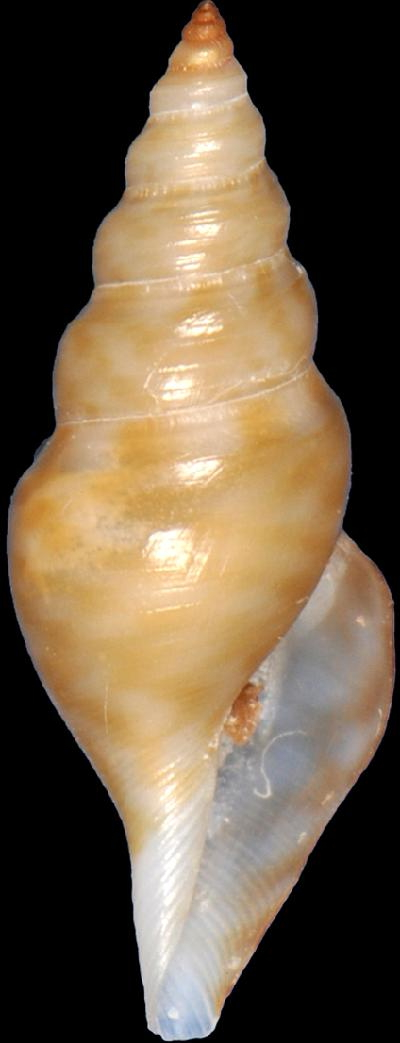
- Shell of Teretia strongyla (museum specimen at MNHN, Paris)

Scientific classification
- Kingdom: Animalia
- Phylum: Mollusca
- Class: Gastropoda
- Subclass: Caenogastropoda
- Order: Neogastropoda
- Superfamily: Conoidea
- Family: Raphitomidae
- Genus: Teretia; Norman, 1888

Type species
- † Pleurotoma anceps Eichwald, 1830

Species
- See text

Synonyms
- Azorilla F. Nordsieck, 1968; Daphnella (Teres); Teres Bucquoy, Dautzenberg & Dollfus, 1883 (Invalid: junior homonym of Teres Boettger, 1878; Teretia is an emendation used as a replacement name)

= Teretia =

Genus of gastropods

Teretia is a genus of sea snails, marine gastropod mollusks in the family Raphitomidae.

== Species ==
Species within the genus Teretia include:

- Teretia acus (Barnard, 1958)
- † Teretia anceps (Eichwald, 1830)
- Teretia candelae Horro & Rolán, 2017
- † Teretia cincta (Seguenza, 1880)
- † Teretia elegantissima (Foresti, 1868)
- † Teretia fusianceps F. Nordsieck, 1972
- † Teretia guersi Schnetler, 2005
- Teretia hoisaeteri Horro & Rolán, 2017
- † Teretia horroi Landau, Van Dingenen & Ceulemans, 2020
- † Teretia intermedia (Foresti, 1874)
- Teretia megalembryon (Dautzenberg & Fischer, 1896)
- † Teretia monterosatoi (Cipolla, 1914)
- † Teretia multicingula (Seguenza, 1880)
- † Teretia nana (Hornung, 1920)
- Teretia neocaledonica Morassi & Bonfitto, 2015
- † Teretia oligocaenica Lozouet, 2017
- † Teretia pentacarinifera Vera-Peláez, 2002
- † Teretia policarinarum Vera-Peláez, 2002
- Teretia sorakonoae Poppe & Tagaro, 2026
- Teretia sysoevi Morassi & Bonfitto, 2015
- Teretia tavianii Morassi & Bonfitto, 2015
- Teretia teres (Reeve, 1844)
- Teretia tongaensis Morassi & Bonfitto, 2015
- † Teretia turritelloides (Bellardi, 1847)

Species brought into synonymy

- Teretia aperta Dall, 1927: synonym of Teretiopsis thaumastopsis (Dautzenberg & Fischer, 1896)
- Teretia strongyla (Dall, 1927): synonym of Teretia megalembryon (Dautzenberg & H. Fischer, 1896)
- Teretia thaumastopsis (Dautzenberg & Fischer, 1896): synonym of Teretiopsis thaumastopsis (Dautzenberg & H. Fischer, 1896)
