= Teretia pentacarinifera =

Scientific classification
- Kingdom: Animalia
- Phylum: Mollusca
- Class: Gastropoda
- Subclass: Caenogastropoda
- Order: Neogastropoda
- Superfamily: Conoidea
- Family: Raphitomidae
- Genus: Teretia
- Species: †T. pentacarinifera

Binomial name
- †Teretia pentacarinifera Vera-Peláez, 2002

Extinct species of gastropod

Teretia pentacarinifera is an extinct species of sea snail, a marine gastropod mollusk in the family Raphitomidae.

== Distribution ==
Fossils of this marine species were found in Pliocene strata off Málaga, Spain.
