= Teretia hoisaeteri =

Scientific classification
- Kingdom: Animalia
- Phylum: Mollusca
- Class: Gastropoda
- Subclass: Caenogastropoda
- Order: Neogastropoda
- Superfamily: Conoidea
- Family: Raphitomidae
- Genus: Teretia
- Species: T. hoisaeteri

Binomial name
- Teretia hoisaeteri Horro & Rolán, 2017

Species of gastropod

Teretia hoisaeteri is a species of sea snail, a marine gastropod mollusk in the family Raphitomidae.

== Description ==
The length of the shell attains 5.5 mm.

== Distribution ==
This marine species occurs off Angola.
