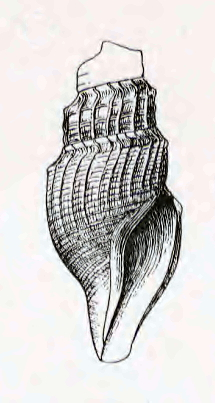
- Original image of a shell of Anticlinura movilla

Scientific classification
- Kingdom: Animalia
- Phylum: Mollusca
- Class: Gastropoda
- Subclass: Caenogastropoda
- Order: Neogastropoda
- Superfamily: Conoidea
- Family: Mangeliidae
- Genus: Anticlinura
- Species: A. movilla

Binomial name
- Anticlinura movilla (W. H. Dall, 1908)

Synonyms
- Mangilia movilla Dall, 1908 (original combination)

= Anticlinura movilla =

Species of gastropod

Anticlinura movilla is a species of sea snail, a marine gastropod mollusk in the family Mangeliidae.

== Description ==
The length of the shell attains 4.9 mm, its diameter 2.6 mm.

(Original description) The small, thin, white shell has a fusiform shape. It contains about five whorls beside the (eroded) protoconch. The suture is distinct and slightly appressed. The anal fasciole is narrow, nearly smooth except for lines of growth, bordered in front by an inconspicuous angular shoulder. From this shoulder extend (on the body whorl about eighteen) feeble, narrow, subequal, protractive, axial riblets, with subequal interspaces, crossed by fine, close-set spiral threads. The ribs extend to the suture, or on the body whorl to the base, and the threads cover the whole surface. The anal sulcus is shallow. The outer lip is thin, simple, moderately arcuate. The columella and the body are smooth, the former obliquely attenuated in front and impervious. The siphonal canal is short, wide and slightly recurved

== Distribution ==
This marine species occurs in the Pacific Ocean off Acapulco, Mexico.
