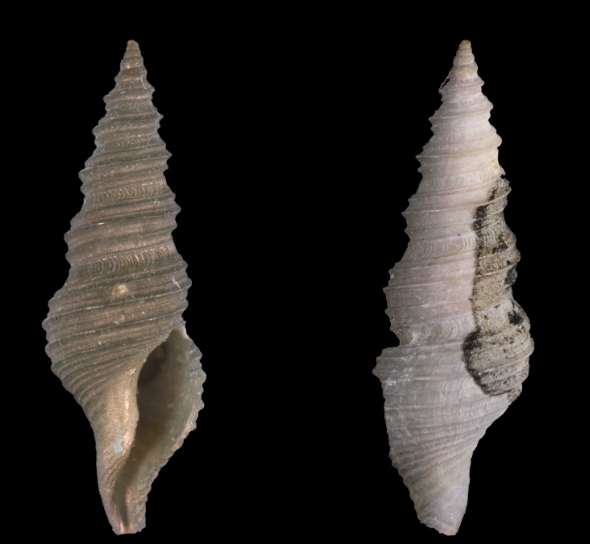
- Shell of Teretia candelae (paratype at MNHN, Paris)

Scientific classification
- Kingdom: Animalia
- Phylum: Mollusca
- Class: Gastropoda
- Subclass: Caenogastropoda
- Order: Neogastropoda
- Superfamily: Conoidea
- Family: Raphitomidae
- Genus: Teretia
- Species: T. candelae

Binomial name
- Teretia candelae Horro & Rolán, 2017

= Teretia candelae =

Species of gastropod

Teretia candelae is a species of sea snail, a marine gastropod mollusk in the family Raphitomidae.

== Description ==
The length of the shell attains 7 mm.

== Distribution ==
This marine species occurs off Mauretania to Angola.
