= Teretiopsis nodicarinatus =

Scientific classification
- Kingdom: Animalia
- Phylum: Mollusca
- Class: Gastropoda
- Subclass: Caenogastropoda
- Order: Neogastropoda
- Superfamily: Conoidea
- Family: Raphitomidae
- Genus: Teretiopsis
- Species: T. nodicarinatus

Binomial name
- Teretiopsis nodicarinatus Kantor & Sysoev, 1989

Species of gastropod

Teretiopsis nodicarinatus is a species of sea snail, a marine gastropod mollusk belonging to the family Raphitomidae.

== Description ==
The length of the shell attains 4.9 mm, its diameter 2.9 mm.

Teretiopsis nodicarinatus live in demersal and tropical environments.

== Distribution ==
This marine species was found in Southeast Pacific, off the Salas y Gómez Ridge at a depth of 750 m.
