= Teretiopsis levicarinatus =

Scientific classification
- Kingdom: Animalia
- Phylum: Mollusca
- Class: Gastropoda
- Subclass: Caenogastropoda
- Order: Neogastropoda
- Superfamily: Conoidea
- Family: Raphitomidae
- Genus: Teretiopsis
- Species: T. levicarinatus

Binomial name
- Teretiopsis levicarinatus Kantor & Sysoev, 1989

Species of gastropod

Teretiopsis levicarinatus is a species of sea snail, a marine gastropod mollusk in the family Raphitomidae.

== Description ==
The length of the shell attains 10.7 mm, its diameter (with broken outer lip) 6.4 mm.

== Distribution ==
This marine species was found off Liberia at a depth of 2,800 m.
