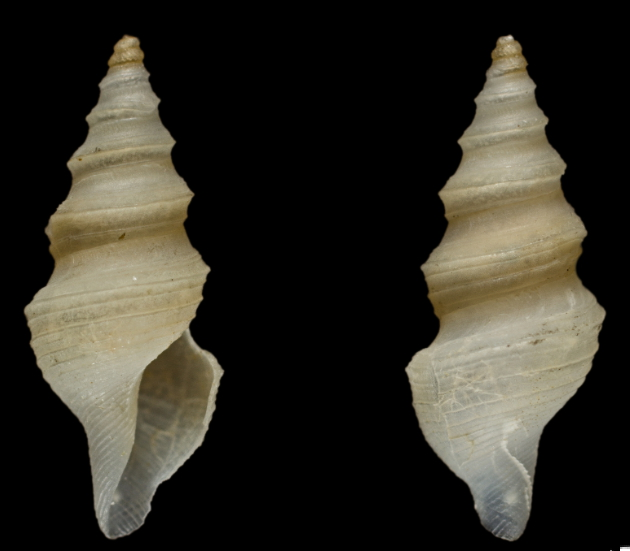
- Shell of Teretia sysoevi (holotype in the MNHN, Paris)

Scientific classification
- Kingdom: Animalia
- Phylum: Mollusca
- Class: Gastropoda
- Subclass: Caenogastropoda
- Order: Neogastropoda
- Superfamily: Conoidea
- Family: Raphitomidae
- Genus: Teretia
- Species: T. sysoevi

Binomial name
- Teretia sysoevi Morassi & Bonfitto, 2015

= Teretia sysoevi =

Species of gastropod

Teretia sysoevi is a species of sea snail, a marine gastropod mollusk in the family Raphitomidae.

== Distribution ==
This marine species occurs off Wallis and Futuna.
