= Teretiopsis abyssalis =

Scientific classification
- Kingdom: Animalia
- Phylum: Mollusca
- Class: Gastropoda
- Subclass: Caenogastropoda
- Order: Neogastropoda
- Superfamily: Conoidea
- Family: Raphitomidae
- Genus: Teretiopsis
- Species: T. abyssalis

Binomial name
- Teretiopsis abyssalis Kantor & Sysoev, 1989

Species of gastropod

Teretiopsis abyssalis is a species of sea snail, a marine gastropod mollusk in the family Raphitomidae.

== Description ==
The length of the shell attains 14.3 mm, its diameter is 9.2 mm.

== Distribution ==
This marine species was found east of Japan at a depth of 5,510 m.
