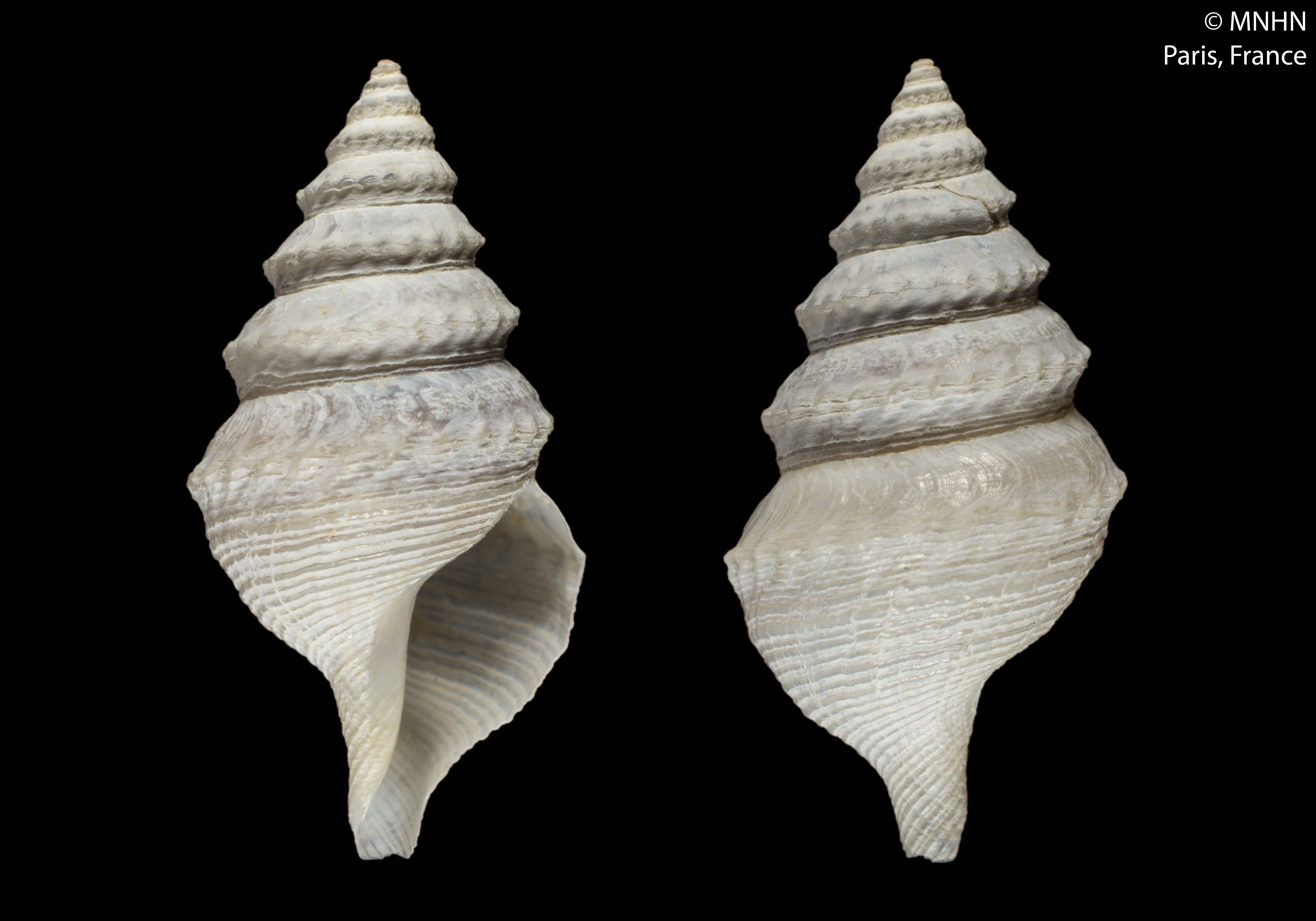
- Shell of Clinura vitrea (holotype at MNHN, Paris)

Scientific classification
- Kingdom: Animalia
- Phylum: Mollusca
- Class: Gastropoda
- Subclass: Caenogastropoda
- Order: Neogastropoda
- Superfamily: Conoidea
- Family: Raphitomidae
- Genus: Clinura
- Species: C. vitrea

Binomial name
- Clinura vitrea Sysoev, 1997

= Clinura vitrea =

Species of gastropod

Clinura vitrea is a species of sea snail, a marine gastropod mollusk in the family Raphitomidae.

== Description ==
The length of the shell attains 21.3 mm, its diameter is 10.5 mm.

== Distribution ==
This marine species occurs off the Tanimbar Islands, eastern Indonesia and in the Banda Sea at depths between 417 m and 425 m.
