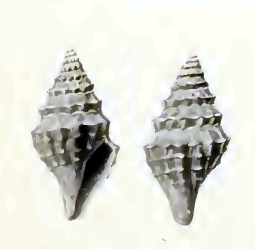
- Anticlinura biconica

Scientific classification
- Kingdom: Animalia
- Phylum: Mollusca
- Class: Gastropoda
- Subclass: Caenogastropoda
- Order: Neogastropoda
- Superfamily: Conoidea
- Family: Mangeliidae
- Genus: Anticlinura; Thiele, 1934

Type species
- Clinura monochorda Dall, 1908

Species
- See text

Synonyms
- Clinuromella Beets, 1943; Clinuropsis Thiele, 1929 (Invalid: junior homonym of Clinuropsis Vincent, 1913; Anticlinura and Clinuromella are replacement names)

= Anticlinura =

Genus of gastropods

Anticlinura is a genus of minute sea snails, marine gastropod mollusks or micromollusks in the family Mangeliidae.

== Species ==
Species within the genus Anticlinura include:

- Anticlinura atlantica Garcia, 2005
- Anticlinura biconica (Schepman, 1913)
- Anticlinura monochorda (Dall, 1908)
- Anticlinura movilla (Dall, 1908)
- Anticlinura peruviana (Dall, 1908)
- Anticlinura serilla (Dall, 1908)
