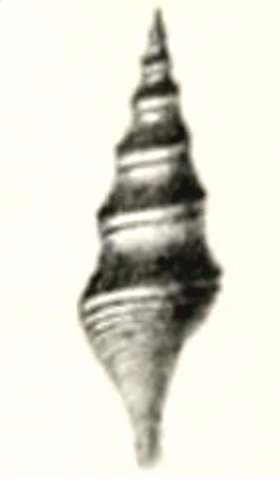
- Shell of † Teretia turritelloides (holotype)

Scientific classification
- Kingdom: Animalia
- Phylum: Mollusca
- Class: Gastropoda
- Subclass: Caenogastropoda
- Order: Neogastropoda
- Superfamily: Conoidea
- Family: Raphitomidae
- Genus: Teretia
- Species: †T. turritelloides

Binomial name
- †Teretia turritelloides (Bellardi, 1847)

Synonyms
- † Pleurotoma turritelloides Bellardi, 1847 superseded combination

= Teretia turritelloides =

Extinct species of gastropod

Teretia turritelloides is an extinct species of sea snail, a marine gastropod mollusk in the family Raphitomidae.

== Description ==
(Original description in Latin) The shell is turreted: the spire is elevated; the whorls are convex and are multi-carinate (having many keels or ridges). The median keel is more elevated; the [whorls are] canaliculated (grooved) and smooth posteriorly (behind, or on the upper part); the body whorl is rounded and striate (grooved with lines) anteriorly (in front, or on the lower part). The siphonal canal is short and contorted (twisted). The outer lip is wing-shaped, simple, and sharp; [there is] a deep fissure.

== Distribution ==
Fossils of this marine species were found in Piedmont, Italy.
