= Teretia acus =

Scientific classification
- Kingdom: Animalia
- Phylum: Mollusca
- Class: Gastropoda
- Subclass: Caenogastropoda
- Order: Neogastropoda
- Superfamily: Conoidea
- Family: Raphitomidae
- Genus: Teretia
- Species: T. acus

Binomial name
- Teretia acus (Barnard, 1958)

Synonyms
- Acrobela acus Barnard, 1958

Species of gastropod

Teretia acus is a species of sea snail, a marine gastropod mollusk in the family Raphitomidae.

== Description ==
The length of the shell attains 4.75 mm, its diameter is 2 mm.

== Distribution ==
This marine species occurs off Cape Recife, South Africa.
