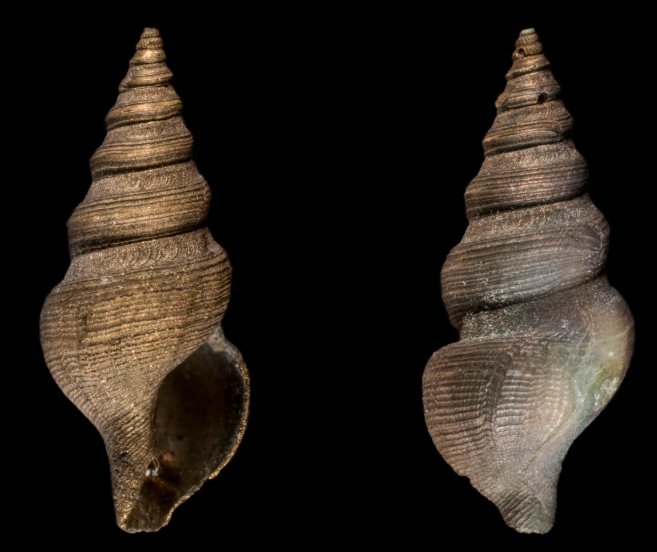
- Shell of Teretia tongaensis (holotype in the MNHN, Paris)

Scientific classification
- Kingdom: Animalia
- Phylum: Mollusca
- Class: Gastropoda
- Subclass: Caenogastropoda
- Order: Neogastropoda
- Superfamily: Conoidea
- Family: Raphitomidae
- Genus: Teretia
- Species: T. tongaensis

Binomial name
- Teretia tongaensis Morassi & Bonfitto, 2015

= Teretia tongaensis =

Species of gastropod

Teretia tongaensis is a species of sea snail, a marine gastropod mollusk in the family Raphitomidae.

== Distribution ==
This marine species occurs in the Pacific Ocean off Tonga.
