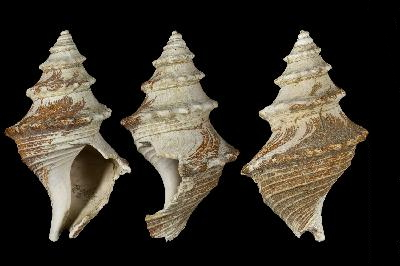
- Shells of Clinura calliope (specimens at MNHN, Paris)

Scientific classification
- Kingdom: Animalia
- Phylum: Mollusca
- Class: Gastropoda
- Subclass: Caenogastropoda
- Order: Neogastropoda
- Superfamily: Conoidea
- Family: Raphitomidae
- Genus: Clinura
- Species: C. calliope

Binomial name
- Clinura calliope (Brocchi, 1814)

Synonyms
- † Murex (Pleurotoma) calliope Brocchi, 1814 (original combination); † Surcula (Clinura) calliope (Brocchi, 1814)

= Clinura calliope =

Species of gastropod

Clinura calliope is a species of sea snail, a marine gastropod mollusk in the family Raphitomidae.

== Description ==
The length of the shell varies between 27 mm and 42 mm.

== Distribution ==
Fossils of this marine species were found in Miocene strata of Tuscany, Italy; also in Lower Pliocene strata near Antibes, France, and in Pliocene strata in Málaga, Spain.
