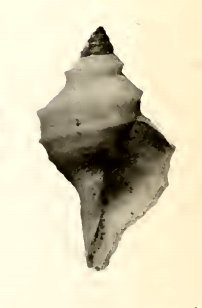
- Teretiopsis thaumastopsis

Scientific classification
- Kingdom: Animalia
- Phylum: Mollusca
- Class: Gastropoda
- Subclass: Caenogastropoda
- Order: Neogastropoda
- Superfamily: Conoidea
- Family: Raphitomidae
- Genus: Teretiopsis; Kantor & Sysoev, 1989

Type species
- Teretiopsis levicarinatus Kantor & Sysoev, 1989

Species
- See text

= Teretiopsis =

Genus of gastropods

Teretiopsis is a genus of sea snails, marine gastropod mollusks in the family Raphitomidae.

== Species ==
Species within the genus Teretiopsis include:

- Teretiopsis abyssalis Kantor & Sysoev, 1989
- Teretiopsis hyalina Sysoev & Bouchet, 2001
- Teretiopsis levicarinatus Kantor & Sysoev, 1989
- Teretiopsis nodicarinatus Kantor & Sysoev, 1989
- Teretiopsis thaumastopsis (Dautzenberg & Fischer H., 1896)

Synonyms

- Teretiopsis levicarinatus Kantor & Sysoev, 1989: synonym of Teretiopsis levicarinata Kantor & Sysoev, 1989 (wrong gender agreement of specific epithet)
- Teretiopsis nodicarinatus Kantor & Sysoev, 1989: synonym of Teretiopsis nodicarinata Kantor & Sysoev, 1989 (wrong gender agreement of specific epithet)
