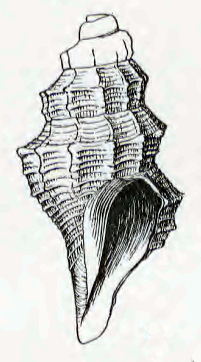
- Original image of a shell of Anticlinura peruviana

Scientific classification
- Kingdom: Animalia
- Phylum: Mollusca
- Class: Gastropoda
- Subclass: Caenogastropoda
- Order: Neogastropoda
- Superfamily: Conoidea
- Family: Mangeliidae
- Genus: Anticlinura
- Species: A. peruviana

Binomial name
- Anticlinura peruviana (W.H. Dall, 1908)

Synonyms
- Clinura peruviana Dall, 1908 (original combination)

= Anticlinura peruviana =

Species of gastropod

Anticlinura movilla is a species of sea snail, a marine gastropod mollusk in the family Mangeliidae.

== Description ==
The length of the shell attains 9 mm, its diameter 4.2 mm.

(Original description) The small, white shell shows a thin grayish periostracum. It contains about five similarly sculptured whorls exclusive of the (lost) protoconch;. The axial sculpture consists of (on the body whorl thirteen) sharp, narrow, vertical ribs, feeble and concavely excavated between the suture and the keeled shoulder of the whorl, there prominently angular beyond the shoulder vertical, becoming obsolete on the base. Beside this the incremental lines are minutely elevated and rasplike over the whole surface, but most so between the spirals. The suture is distinct, not appressed. The whorl between it and the shoulder is descending and flattened, with five or six revolving fine threads and some secondary, finer intercalary threads. The shoulder shows a prominent small, rounded keel, undulated by the ribs, beyond which similar spiral threads to the number of a dozen or more, with wider interspaces, to the siphonal canal. The first interspace has three equal fine intercalary threads, the second two, and the remainder one each, becoming gradually closer anteriorly. The aperture is rather narrow. The anal sulcus is wide, shallow, extending from the shoulder to the suture. The aperture is angulated by the shoulder keel. The outer lip is thin and entire. The body of the shell shows a wash of callus, white, polished. The columella is rapidly attenuated, straight, the axis not pervious. The siphonal canal is narrow and straight.

== Distribution ==
This marine species occurs in the Pacific Ocean off Northern Peru
