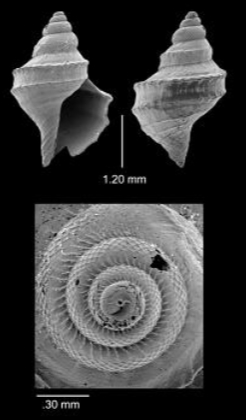
- Shell and protoconch of Teretiopsis thaumastopsis (holotype at the Smithsonian Institution)

Scientific classification
- Kingdom: Animalia
- Phylum: Mollusca
- Class: Gastropoda
- Subclass: Caenogastropoda
- Order: Neogastropoda
- Superfamily: Conoidea
- Family: Raphitomidae
- Genus: Teretiopsis
- Species: T. thaumastopsis

Binomial name
- Teretiopsis thaumastopsis (Dautzenberg & Fischer H., 1896)

Synonyms
- Pleurotoma thaumastopsis Dautzenberg & Fischer, 1896 (original combination); Pleurotomella (Eucyclotoma) aperta Dall, 1927; Teretia aperta Dall, 1927; Teretia thaumastopsis (Dautzenberg & Fischer, 1896)

= Teretiopsis thaumastopsis =

Species of gastropod

Teretiopsis thaumastopsis is a species of sea snail, a marine gastropod mollusk in the family Raphitomidae.

== Description ==
The length of the shell attains 10 mm, its diameter 5.5 mm.

(Original description in Latin and French) The shell is thin. The spire has a conoid shape. It is not much elevated and acuminate at the top. The spire consists of six whorls separated by a well-marked suture. The protoconch contains four embryonic whorls: the first is smooth, the next two are reticulated, the fourth likewise reticulated on its lower half, but decorated, at the top, with arched longitudinal folds. The first spiral whorl shows below the subsutural area which is sloping, not excavated, a very prominent keel which extends to the body whorl. On the body whorl, a second keel begins at the point of contact of the outer lip and the recurrent cords. They fill the entire lower part of the shell. The shell contains numerous, weak growth lines. The aperture is pyriform, terminating in a fairly long, open siphonal canal. The columella is at first almost perpendicular, then slightly twists towards the base, which is acuminate. The slender outer lip is sharp, somewhat polygonous and slightly indented at the top. The shell has a white color with the exception of the embryonic whorls which are yellowish-brown.

== Biology ==
The digestive system lacks a radula sac, venom, and salivary glands.

== Distribution ==
T. thaumatopsis can be found in the Gulf of Mexico, ranging from the coast of Georgia to western Florida.; in the Atlantic Ocean; also off the Azores at bathyal depths.
