= Crassispira hosoi =

Scientific classification
- Kingdom: Animalia
- Phylum: Mollusca
- Class: Gastropoda
- Subclass: Caenogastropoda
- Order: Neogastropoda
- Superfamily: Conoidea
- Family: Pseudomelatomidae
- Genus: Crassispira
- Species: C. hosoi

Binomial name
- Crassispira hosoi (Okutani, 1964)

Synonyms
- Clinura hosoi (Okutani, 1964); Imaclava hosoi Okutani, 1964 (original combination); Splendrillia hosoi (Okutani, 1964)

Species of gastropod

Crassispira hosoi is a species of sea snail, a marine gastropod mollusk in the family Pseudomelatomidae.

== Distribution ==
This marine species occurs off Japan
