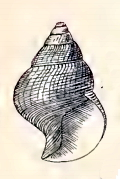
- Original image of a shell of Pleurotomella lottae

Scientific classification
- Kingdom: Animalia
- Phylum: Mollusca
- Class: Gastropoda
- Subclass: Caenogastropoda
- Order: Neogastropoda
- Superfamily: Conoidea
- Family: Raphitomidae
- Genus: Pleurotomella
- Species: P. lottae

Binomial name
- Pleurotomella lottae (Verrill, 1885)

Synonyms
- Azorilla lottae (Verrill, 1885)

= Pleurotomella lottae =

Species of gastropod

Pleurotomella lottae is a species of sea snail, a marine gastropod mollusk in the family Raphitomidae.

== Description ==
The length of the shell attains 11.5 mm, its diameter 7.5 mm.

(Original description) The small, short shell has an ovate-fusiform shape. it is moderately stout, with slightly shouldered, convex whorls, and a regularly tapered, acute spire. The Suture is shallow, but well-marked. The shell consists of 4½ whorls, besides the large protoconch, which consists of about 3½ gradually increasing whorls. The whorls of the spire are obscurely shouldered at about the middle, above which the broad, sloping subsutural band is slightly concave. The sculpture on the penultimate whorl consists of about six elevated, rounded, revolving cinguli, with some much finer intermediate ones; some of the smaller cinguli are also found on the subsutural band. The transverse sculpture consists of fine, slightly flexuous lines of growth, crossing both the cinguli and their intervals, and on the subsutural band becoming more prominent in the form of oblique, recurved riblets, which do not take the form of nodules. On the body whorl the revolving cinguli continue at about uniform distances over the entire whorl and siphonal canal, but anteriorly the cinguli thicken and are wider than the grooves, while on the convex part of the whorl they are narrower than the intervals. The aperture is broad-ovate, rather large, acute posteriorly. The outer lip is thin, strongly convex in the middle, with a broad and shallow posterior sinus above the shoulder. The siphonal canal is short, straight, not contracted at the base. The columella is straight in the middle, with an oblique anterior edge. The inner margin of the aperture is strongly excavated and subangular at the base of the columella. There is no umbilicus . The animal is destitute of an operculum. The protoconch whorls are deep chestnut-brown, very minutely reticulated by oblique lines running in two directions. The whorls are regularly convex, the apical ones minute and a little prominent, so that the apex is acute. The color of the shell below the brown protoconch is translucent bluish white, with a somewhat glossy surface; when dead, yellowish white.

== Distribution ==
This marine species occurs off the New Jersey, United States.
