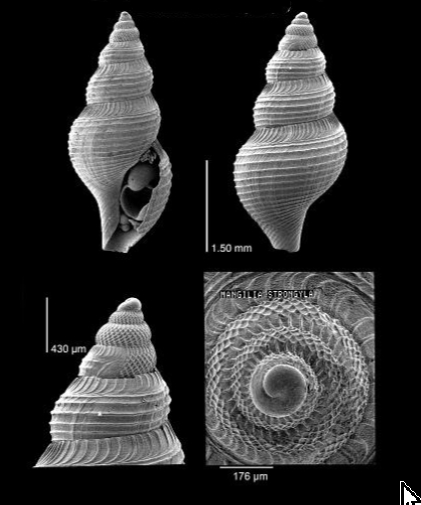
- Shell of Teretia megalembryon (syntype at the Smithsonian Institution)

Scientific classification
- Kingdom: Animalia
- Phylum: Mollusca
- Class: Gastropoda
- Subclass: Caenogastropoda
- Order: Neogastropoda
- Superfamily: Conoidea
- Family: Raphitomidae
- Genus: Teretia
- Species: T. megalembryon

Binomial name
- Teretia megalembryon (Dautzenberg & Fischer, 1896)

Synonyms
- Azorilla megalembryon (Dautzenberg & H. Fischer, 1896); Mangelia strongyla Dall, 1927; Mangilia sericifila var. strongyla Dall, 1927; Mangilia percompacta Dall, 1927; Pleurotoma megalembryon Dautzenberg & Fischer, 1896 (original combination); Pleurotomella megalembryon (Dautzenberg & H. Fischer, 1896); Teretia strongyla (Dall, 1927)

= Teretia megalembryon =

Species of gastropod

Teretia megalembryon is a species of sea snail, a marine gastropod mollusk in the family Raphitomidae.

== Description ==
The length of the shell attains 3 mm.

The minute, solid shell is whitish, except for the yellowish brown protoconch. The shell consists of 7 convex whorls, including 4 whorls in the protoconch. The suture is distinct, constricted, with a fringe of minute axial wrinkles on the fasciole in front of it. There are many well-developed growth lines. There is no other axial sculpture except faint incremental lines. The spiral sculpture consists of (on the penultimate whorl 6 and on the body whorl about 10) fine, equal and equally distributed low threads with narrower interspaces, covering the whole shell except the anal fasciole. The aperture is ample, hardly differentiated from the short siphonal canal. The anal sulcus is wide and rather deep. The sharp outer lip is prominently arcuate. The almost vertical columella is short, twisted, strong. The axis is minutely pervious.

== Distribution ==
This species occurs in the Atlantic Ocean off the Azores and off Georgia, USA.
