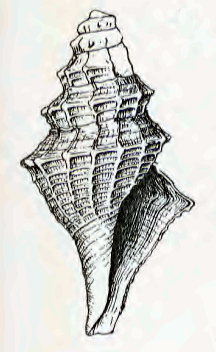
- Original image of a shell of Anticlinura monochorda

Scientific classification
- Kingdom: Animalia
- Phylum: Mollusca
- Class: Gastropoda
- Subclass: Caenogastropoda
- Order: Neogastropoda
- Superfamily: Conoidea
- Family: Mangeliidae
- Genus: Anticlinura
- Species: A. monochorda

Binomial name
- Anticlinura monochorda (W.H. Dall, 1908)

Synonyms
- Clinura monochorda Dall, 1908 (original combination)

= Anticlinura monochorda =

Species of gastropod

Anticlinura monochorda is a species of sea snail, a marine gastropod mollusk in the family Mangeliidae.

== Description ==
The length of the shell attains 11 mm.

(Original description) The small, white shell has a biconic shape with a very thin yellowish periostracum. It contains six sharply angular whorls. The protoconch is eroded. The suture is distinct, not appressed. The axial sculpture consists of (on the penultimate whorl thirteen, on the body whorl seventeen) sharp, narrow, nearly vertical ribs, with wider interspaces, arcuate and feeble above the periphery, where they form angular projections, obsolete on the last half of the body whorl. They become obsolete midway between the periphery and the siphonal canal. The upper surface of the whorls are flattish, sloping, with about fifteen fine, close, more or less alternated spiral threads. The periphery contains a strong projecting spiral keel more or less angulated by the ribs at their intersections. In. front of the keel are about fifteen primary spiral ridges, low, with wider interspaces. Both the ridges and the interspaces are sculptured with finer subequal close secondary threads, except on the siphonal canal where they alternate. The aperture is elongate, angulated by the keel . The anal sulcus is wide and shallow. The outer lip is sharp, thin, crenulated by the spiral sculpture. The body shows a thin wash of callus. The columella is straight, obliquely truncate in front. The siphonal canal is moderately long, rather wide and slightly flaring at the end. There is no operculum .

== Distribution ==
This marine species occurs in the Gulf of Panama, Panama, Pacific Ocean.
