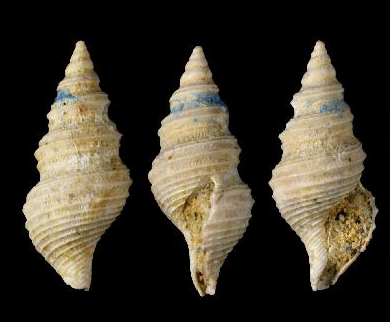
- Shell of Teretia anceps (specimen at MNHN, Paris)

Scientific classification
- Kingdom: Animalia
- Phylum: Mollusca
- Class: Gastropoda
- Subclass: Caenogastropoda
- Order: Neogastropoda
- Superfamily: Conoidea
- Family: Raphitomidae
- Genus: Teretia
- Species: T. anceps

Binomial name
- Teretia anceps (Eichwald, 1830)

Synonyms
- † Daphnella (Teres) anceps (Eichwald, 1830); Defrancia teres Jeffreys, 1857; Mangelia teres Forb. & Hanl., 1849; † Pleurotoma anceps Eichwald, 1830; Pleurotoma borealis Löven, 1846; Pleurotoma fusiformis Req., 1848 (doubtful synonym); Pleurotoma minuta Arad., 1846; Pleurotoma renieri Cont., 1864; Pleurotoma teres Forb., 1843; Trophon paullulum Wood, 1848 (doubtful synonym)

= Teretia anceps =

Extinct species of gastropod

Teretia anceps is an extinct species of sea snail, a marine gastropod mollusk in the family Raphitomidae.

== Description ==
The length of the shell reaches 11.5 mm, its diameter is 4 mm.

== Distribution ==
Fossils of this marine species were found in Upper Pliocene strata in Alpes-Maritimes, France and in Italy; also in Middle Miocene strata in Poland.
