= P. turris =

P. turris may refer to:

- Pennarhodeus turris, a mite species
- Phymorhynchus turris, a sea snail species found in Japan

== See also ==
- Turris (disambiguation)
