= Rhodacarella =

Scientific classification
- Kingdom: Animalia
- Phylum: Arthropoda
- Subphylum: Chelicerata
- Class: Arachnida
- Order: Mesostigmata
- Family: Rhodacaridae
- Genus: Rhodacarella; Moraza, 2004

Genus of mites

Rhodacarella is a genus of mites in the family Rhodacaridae.

== Species ==
- Rhodacarella cavernicola Moraza, 2004
