= Multidentorhodacarus thysi =

Scientific classification
- Kingdom: Animalia
- Phylum: Arthropoda
- Subphylum: Chelicerata
- Class: Arachnida
- Order: Mesostigmata
- Family: Rhodacaridae
- Genus: Multidentorhodacarus
- Species: M. thysi

Binomial name
- Multidentorhodacarus thysi (Jordaan, Loots & Theron, 1988)

Synonyms
- Rhodacarus thysi Jordaan, Loots & Theron, 1988

Species of mite

Multidentorhodacarus thysi is a species of mite in the family Rhodacaridae.

This species was formerly a member of the genus Rhodacarus.
