= Afrodacarellus euungulae =

Scientific classification
- Kingdom: Animalia
- Phylum: Arthropoda
- Subphylum: Chelicerata
- Class: Arachnida
- Order: Mesostigmata
- Family: Rhodacaridae
- Genus: Afrodacarellus
- Species: A. euungulae

Binomial name
- Afrodacarellus euungulae (Karg, 2003)

Synonyms
- Afrogamasellus euungulae Karg, 2003

Species of mite

Afrodacarellus euungulae is a species of mite in the family Rhodacaridae.

This species was formerly a member of the genus Afrogamasellus.

The taxon's description was first published in 2003 by Wolfgang Karg.
