= Rhodacarellus subterraneus =

Scientific classification
- Kingdom: Animalia
- Phylum: Arthropoda
- Subphylum: Chelicerata
- Class: Arachnida
- Order: Mesostigmata
- Family: Rhodacaridae
- Genus: Rhodacarellus
- Species: R. subterraneus

Binomial name
- Rhodacarellus subterraneus Willmann, 1935

Species of mite

Rhodacarellus subterraneus is a species of mite in the family Rhodacaridae.
