= Afrogamasellus franzi =

Scientific classification
- Kingdom: Animalia
- Phylum: Arthropoda
- Subphylum: Chelicerata
- Class: Arachnida
- Order: Mesostigmata
- Family: Rhodacaridae
- Genus: Afrogamasellus
- Species: A. franzi

Binomial name
- Afrogamasellus franzi (Ryke & Loots, 1966)

Species of mite

Afrogamasellus franzi is a species of mite in the family Rhodacaridae.
