= Rhodacarellus yalujiangensis =

Scientific classification
- Kingdom: Animalia
- Phylum: Arthropoda
- Subphylum: Chelicerata
- Class: Arachnida
- Order: Mesostigmata
- Family: Rhodacaridae
- Genus: Rhodacarellus
- Species: R. yalujiangensis

Binomial name
- Rhodacarellus yalujiangensis Ma, 2003

Species of mite

Rhodacarellus yalujiangensis is a species of mite in the family Rhodacaridae.
