= Afrodacarellus femoratus =

Scientific classification
- Kingdom: Animalia
- Phylum: Arthropoda
- Subphylum: Chelicerata
- Class: Arachnida
- Order: Mesostigmata
- Family: Rhodacaridae
- Genus: Afrodacarellus
- Species: A. femoratus

Binomial name
- Afrodacarellus femoratus Hurlbutt, 1974

Species of mite

Afrodacarellus femoratus is a species of mite in the family Rhodacaridae.
