= Rhodacarus mandibularosimilis =

Scientific classification
- Kingdom: Animalia
- Phylum: Arthropoda
- Subphylum: Chelicerata
- Class: Arachnida
- Order: Mesostigmata
- Family: Rhodacaridae
- Genus: Rhodacarus
- Species: R. mandibularosimilis

Binomial name
- Rhodacarus mandibularosimilis Shcherbak & Kadite, 1979

Species of mite

Rhodacarus mandibularosimilis is a species of mite in the family Rhodacaridae.
