= Rhodacarellus maxidactylus =

Scientific classification
- Kingdom: Animalia
- Phylum: Arthropoda
- Subphylum: Chelicerata
- Class: Arachnida
- Order: Mesostigmata
- Family: Rhodacaridae
- Genus: Rhodacarellus
- Species: R. maxidactylus

Binomial name
- Rhodacarellus maxidactylus Karg, 2000

Species of mite

Rhodacarellus maxidactylus is a species of mite in the family Rhodacaridae.
