= Rhodacarus strenzkei =

Scientific classification
- Kingdom: Animalia
- Phylum: Arthropoda
- Subphylum: Chelicerata
- Class: Arachnida
- Order: Mesostigmata
- Family: Rhodacaridae
- Genus: Rhodacarus
- Species: R. strenzkei

Binomial name
- Rhodacarus strenzkei Willmann, 1957

Species of mite

Rhodacarus strenzkei is a species of mite in the family Rhodacaridae. It is found in Europe.
