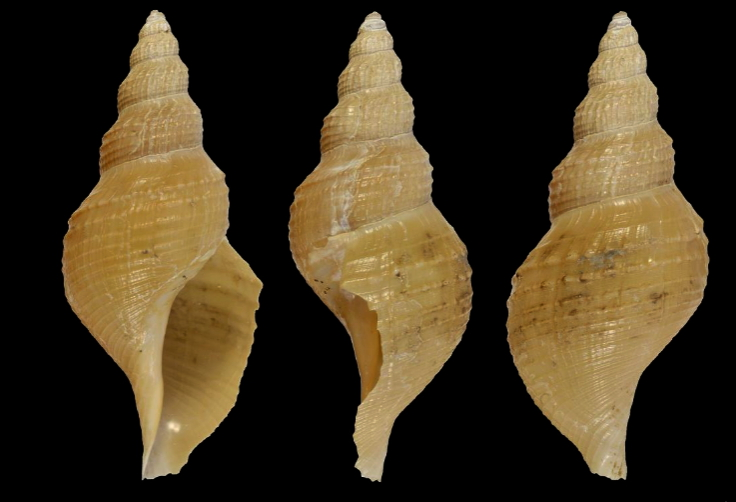
- shell of Phymorhynchus castaneus (holotype at the Smithsonian Institution)

Scientific classification
- Kingdom: Animalia
- Phylum: Mollusca
- Class: Gastropoda
- Subclass: Caenogastropoda
- Order: Neogastropoda
- Superfamily: Conoidea
- Family: Raphitomidae
- Genus: Phymorhynchus
- Species: P. castaneus

Binomial name
- Phymorhynchus castaneus (Dall, 1896)

Synonyms
- Pleurotomella castanea Dall, 1896

= Phymorhynchus castaneus =

Species of gastropod

Phymorhynchus castaneus is a species of sea snail, a marine gastropod mollusk in the family Raphitomidae.

Phymorhynchus castaneus is the type species of the genus Phymorhynchus.

== Distribution ==
This species occurs in the Pacific Ocean off the Galapagos Islands (collected from the depths of 1,322 fathoms (2,418 m)) and in the Gulf of Panama (in the depth 1,823 fathoms (3,334 m)).

== Description ==
The shell is polished, thin. It is resembling Phymorhynchus cingulatus (Dall, 1890), of a chestnut-brown color, fading to a paler pinkish-brown, with seven whorls. The nucleus eroded, the early whorls are with four or five flattened elevated spirals with wider interspaces in front of a somewhat sloping anal fasciole, more or less reticulated by narrow, slender, irregular, elevated riblets in harmony with the lines of growth, and which form on the fasciole delicate arches concave forward. The suture is appressed. On the body there are about twenty spirals, stronger at the shoulder, smaller and closer forward, the wide interspaces finely spirally striate, while the most prominent spirals are undulate or obscurely nodulous. The transverse sculpture is nearly obsolete and hardly to be distinguished from the incremental lines. The aperture is elongate and oval. The outer lip is thin, sharp, crenulated by the sculpture, but not lirate. Anal sulcus is shallow, wide, directly in front of the suture. Body whorl is with a thin wash of callus. Pillar is thin, gyrate, attenuated in front, forming a narrowly pervious axis, the whole of a pinkish-brown color. The canal is short, shallow, not recurved.

The width of the shell is 23 millimetres (0.91 in) and the height is 53 mm (2.1 in). The height of the last whorl is 38 mm (1.5 in), and the height of the aperture is 28 mm (1.1 in).

Phymorhynchus castaneus differs from Phymorhynchus cingulatus by its smaller size, more sloping whorls, more delicate and reticulate sculpture, and by its pervious axis. The animal is blind, and there is no operculum.
