= Afrodacarellus furculatus =

Scientific classification
- Kingdom: Animalia
- Phylum: Arthropoda
- Subphylum: Chelicerata
- Class: Arachnida
- Order: Mesostigmata
- Family: Rhodacaridae
- Genus: Afrodacarellus
- Species: A. furculatus

Binomial name
- Afrodacarellus furculatus (Karg, 1979)

Synonyms
- Afrogamasellus furculatus Karg, 1979

Species of mite

Afrodacarellus furculatus is a species of mite in the family Rhodacaridae.

This species was formerly a member of the genus Afrogamasellus .
