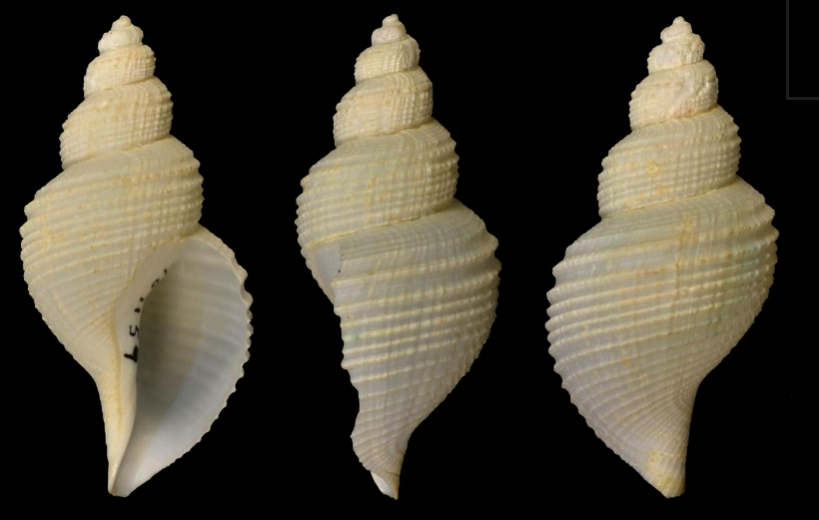
- Shell of Phymorhynchus speciosus (holotype at the Smithsonian Institution)

Scientific classification
- Kingdom: Animalia
- Phylum: Mollusca
- Class: Gastropoda
- Subclass: Caenogastropoda
- Order: Neogastropoda
- Superfamily: Conoidea
- Family: Raphitomidae
- Genus: Phymorhynchus
- Species: P. speciosus

Binomial name
- Phymorhynchus speciosus Olsson, 1971

= Phymorhynchus speciosus =

Species of gastropod

Phymorhynchus speciosus is a species of sea snail, a marine gastropod mollusk in the family Raphitomidae.

== Description ==
The length of the shell attains 37 mm. The shell has an ovate-conical shape and ranges from white to brownish in color.

== Distribution ==
This marine species occurs in the Gulf of Panama at a depth of 3,200 m. It has also been spotted in the Galapágos hotspot.

== Biology ==
This species is closely related to the species of the same genus Phymorhynchus buccinoides. It is a predator, using radula to inject venom into their prey.

== See also ==
- Olsson, Axel A. "Biological results of the University of Miami deep-sea expeditions. 77. Mollusks from the Gulf of Panama collected by R/V John Elliott Pillsbury, 1967." Bulletin of Marine Science 21.1 (1971): 35–92.
- https://pmc.ncbi.nlm.nih.gov/articles/PMC10638732/
