= Protogamasellopsis posnaniensis =

Scientific classification
- Kingdom: Animalia
- Phylum: Arthropoda
- Subphylum: Chelicerata
- Class: Arachnida
- Order: Mesostigmata
- Family: Rhodacaridae
- Genus: Protogamasellopsis
- Species: P. posnaniensis

Binomial name
- Protogamasellopsis posnaniensis Wisniewski & Hirschmann, 1991

Species of mite

Protogamasellopsis posnaniensis is a species of mite in the family Rhodacaridae.
