= Rhodacarus roseus =

Scientific classification
- Kingdom: Animalia
- Phylum: Arthropoda
- Subphylum: Chelicerata
- Class: Arachnida
- Order: Mesostigmata
- Family: Rhodacaridae
- Genus: Rhodacarus
- Species: R. roseus

Binomial name
- Rhodacarus roseus Oudemans, 1902

Species of mite

Rhodacarus roseus is a species of mite in the family Rhodacaridae. It is found in Europe.
