= Poropodalius acutus =

Scientific classification
- Kingdom: Animalia
- Phylum: Arthropoda
- Subphylum: Chelicerata
- Class: Arachnida
- Order: Mesostigmata
- Family: Rhodacaridae
- Genus: Poropodalius
- Species: P. acutus

Binomial name
- Poropodalius acutus Karg, 2000

Species of mite

Poropodalius acutus is a species of mite in the family Rhodacaridae.
