= Poropodalius hexapennatus =

Scientific classification
- Kingdom: Animalia
- Phylum: Arthropoda
- Subphylum: Chelicerata
- Class: Arachnida
- Order: Mesostigmata
- Family: Rhodacaridae
- Genus: Poropodalius
- Species: P. hexapennatus

Binomial name
- Poropodalius hexapennatus Karg, 2000

Species of mite

Poropodalius hexapennatus is a species of mite in the family Rhodacaridae, described by Karg in 2000.
