= Protogamasellopsis dioscorus =

Scientific classification
- Kingdom: Animalia
- Phylum: Arthropoda
- Subphylum: Chelicerata
- Class: Arachnida
- Order: Mesostigmata
- Family: Rhodacaridae
- Genus: Protogamasellopsis
- Species: P. dioscorus

Binomial name
- Protogamasellopsis dioscorus (Manson, 1972)

Species of mite

Protogamasellopsis dioscorus is a species of mite in the family Rhodacaridae.
