= Protogamasellopsis transversus =

Scientific classification
- Kingdom: Animalia
- Phylum: Arthropoda
- Subphylum: Chelicerata
- Class: Arachnida
- Order: Mesostigmata
- Family: Rhodacaridae
- Genus: Protogamasellopsis
- Species: P. transversus

Binomial name
- Protogamasellopsis transversus Karg, 2000

Species of mite

Protogamasellopsis transversus is a species of mite in the family Rhodacaridae.
