= Pennarhodeus pennatus =

Scientific classification
- Kingdom: Animalia
- Phylum: Arthropoda
- Subphylum: Chelicerata
- Class: Arachnida
- Order: Mesostigmata
- Family: Rhodacaridae
- Genus: Pennarhodeus
- Species: P. pennatus

Binomial name
- Pennarhodeus pennatus Karg, 2000

Species of mite

Pennarhodeus pennatus is a species of mite in the family Rhodacaridae.
