= Rhodacarellus silesiacus =

Scientific classification
- Kingdom: Animalia
- Phylum: Arthropoda
- Subphylum: Chelicerata
- Class: Arachnida
- Order: Mesostigmata
- Family: Rhodacaridae
- Genus: Rhodacarellus
- Species: R. silesiacus

Binomial name
- Rhodacarellus silesiacus Willmann, 1936

Species of mite

Rhodacarellus silesiacus is a species of mite in the family Rhodacaridae.
