= Protogamasellopsis corticalis =

Scientific classification
- Kingdom: Animalia
- Phylum: Arthropoda
- Subphylum: Chelicerata
- Class: Arachnida
- Order: Mesostigmata
- Family: Rhodacaridae
- Genus: Protogamasellopsis
- Species: P. corticalis

Binomial name
- Protogamasellopsis corticalis Evans & Purvis, 1987

Species of mite

Protogamasellopsis corticalis is a species of mite in the family Rhodacaridae.
