= Rhodacarus gracilis =

Scientific classification
- Kingdom: Animalia
- Phylum: Arthropoda
- Subphylum: Chelicerata
- Class: Arachnida
- Order: Mesostigmata
- Family: Rhodacaridae
- Genus: Rhodacarus
- Species: R. gracilis

Binomial name
- Rhodacarus gracilis Shcherbak, 1980

Species of mite

Rhodacarus gracilis is a species of mite in the family Rhodacaridae.
