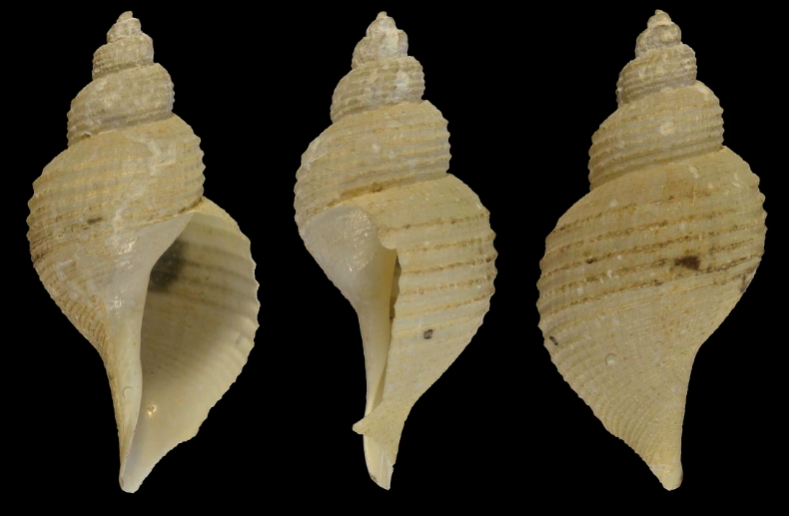
- Shell of Phymorhynchus clarinda (holotype at the Smithsonian Institution)

Scientific classification
- Kingdom: Animalia
- Phylum: Mollusca
- Class: Gastropoda
- Subclass: Caenogastropoda
- Order: Neogastropoda
- Superfamily: Conoidea
- Family: Raphitomidae
- Genus: Phymorhynchus
- Species: P. clarinda

Binomial name
- Phymorhynchus clarinda (Dall, 1908)

Synonyms
- Pleurotomella ( ? Phymorhynchus) clarinda Dall, 1908

= Phymorhynchus clarinda =

Species of gastropod

Phymorhynchus clarinda is a species of sea snail, a marine gastropod mollusk in the family Raphitomidae.

== Description ==
The length of the shell attains 39 mm, its diameter 18 mm.

(Original description) The thin, fusiform shell is white, with a pale yellowish periostracum,. It contains six whorls rounded, flattened a little over the anal fasciole in front of the suture, which is very distinct but not channelled. The protoconch is eroded. The subsequent whorls show between the suture and the shoulder five or six fine, sharp, spiral threads with wider interspaces, which are not beaded by the concavely arcuate growth lines which are prominent on the fasciole. At the shoulder is a weak spiral ridge, followed by five stronger ones, subequal and equidistant with wider interspaces. On a sixth similar ridge the suture is wound, followed by, on the base, about thirty similar but less prominent ridges which gradually diminish in size and strength, and approximate more closely to each other until the siphonal canal is reached. Over all these ridges and interspaces fine sharp threads run spirally, as on the fasciole and are perhaps a little more prominent on the ridges, where they are rendered more or less scabrous by the elevated lines of growth. The outer lip is thin with a shallow rounded excavation, near the suture, which forms the anal sulcus. The body is polished, with the spiral sculpture erased. The columella is thin, gyrate, pervious, white, with a slightly thickened edge. The siphonal canal is short, wide, slightly recurved.

== Distribution ==
This marine species occurs in the Pacific Ocean off Panama Bay and Malpelo Island, Colombia at a depth of 3,240 m.
