= Poropodalius =

Scientific classification
- Kingdom: Animalia
- Phylum: Arthropoda
- Subphylum: Chelicerata
- Class: Arachnida
- Order: Mesostigmata
- Infraorder: Gamasina
- Superfamily: Rhodacaroidea
- Family: Rhodacaridae
- Genus: Poropodalius; Karg, 2000

Genus of mites

Poropodalius is a genus of mites in the family Rhodacaridae. There are about five described species in Poropodalius.

== Species ==
These five species belong to the genus Poropodalius:

- Poropodalius acutus Karg, 2000
- Poropodalius basisetae Karg, 2000
- Poropodalius crispus Karg, 2000
- Poropodalius hexapennatus Karg, 2000
- Poropodalius medioflagelli Karg & Schorlemmer, 2009
