= Afrodacarellus =

Scientific classification
- Kingdom: Animalia
- Phylum: Arthropoda
- Subphylum: Chelicerata
- Class: Arachnida
- Order: Mesostigmata
- Family: Rhodacaridae
- Genus: Afrodacarellus; Hurlbutt, 1974

Genus of mites

Afrodacarellus is a genus of mites in the family Rhodacaridae. There are at least 30 described species in Afrodacarellus.

== Species ==
These 30 species belong to the genus Afrodacarellus:

- Afrodacarellus bakeri (Hurlbutt, 1974)
- Afrodacarellus bipilosus (Karg, 1979)
- Afrodacarellus camaxiloensis (Loots, 1969)
- Afrodacarellus citri (Loots, 1969)
- Afrodacarellus concavus Hurlbutt, 1974
- Afrodacarellus euungulae (Karg, 2003)
- Afrodacarellus femoratus Hurlbutt, 1974
- Afrodacarellus filofissus (Karg & Schorlemmer, 2009)
- Afrodacarellus furculatus (Karg, 1979)
- Afrodacarellus kivuensis (Ryke & Loots, 1966)
- Afrodacarellus leleupi (Ryke & Loots, 1966)
- Afrodacarellus longipodus Hurlbutt, 1974
- Afrodacarellus lubalensis (Loots, 1969)
- Afrodacarellus lunguensis (Ryke & Loots, 1966)
- Afrodacarellus lupangaensis Hurlbutt, 1974
- Afrodacarellus machadoi (Loots, 1969)
- Afrodacarellus minutus Hurlbutt, 1974
- Afrodacarellus mongii (Hurlbutt, 1974)
- Afrodacarellus mossi Hurlbutt, 1974
- Afrodacarellus msituni Hurlbutt, 1974
- Afrodacarellus myersi (Loots, 1969)
- Afrodacarellus ngorongoroensis Hurlbutt, 1974
- Afrodacarellus novembus Hurlbutt, 1974
- Afrodacarellus pili Hurlbutt, 1974
- Afrodacarellus pocsi Hurlbutt, 1974
- Afrodacarellus reticulatus (Loots, 1969)
- Afrodacarellus ruwenzoriensis (Loots, 1969)
- Afrodacarellus squamosus (Karg, 1977)
- Afrodacarellus succinctus (Berlese, 1916)
- Afrodacarellus unospinae (Karg, 2003)
