= Phymorhynchus agina =

Scientific classification
- Kingdom: Animalia
- Phylum: Mollusca
- Class: Gastropoda
- Subclass: Caenogastropoda
- Order: Neogastropoda
- Superfamily: Conoidea
- Family: Raphitomidae
- Genus: Phymorhynchus
- Species: P. agina

Binomial name
- Phymorhynchus agina (Olsson, 1942)

Synonyms
- Pleurotomella (Phymorhynchus) agina Olsson, 1942

Extinct species of gastropod

Phymorhynchus agina is an extinct species of sea snail, a marine gastropod mollusk in the family Raphitomidae.

== Distribution ==
This marine species has been found in Pliocene strata of Charco Azul, Panama
