= Phymorhynchus wareni =

Scientific classification
- Kingdom: Animalia
- Phylum: Mollusca
- Class: Gastropoda
- Subclass: Caenogastropoda
- Order: Neogastropoda
- Superfamily: Conoidea
- Family: Raphitomidae
- Genus: Phymorhynchus
- Species: P. wareni

Binomial name
- Phymorhynchus wareni Sysoev & Kantor, 1995

Species of gastropod

Phymorhynchus wareni is a species of sea snail, a marine gastropod mollusk in the family Raphitomidae.

This species has been described from hydrothermal vents in 1995.
