= Rhodacarellus =

Scientific classification
- Kingdom: Animalia
- Phylum: Arthropoda
- Subphylum: Chelicerata
- Class: Arachnida
- Order: Mesostigmata
- Infraorder: Gamasina
- Superfamily: Rhodacaroidea
- Family: Rhodacaridae
- Genus: Rhodacarellus; Willmann, 1935

Genus of mites

Rhodacarellus is a genus of mites in the family Rhodacaridae. There are at least 20 described species in Rhodacarellus.

== Species ==
These 21 species belong to the genus Rhodacarellus:

- Rhodacarellus apophyseus Karg, 1971
- Rhodacarellus arcanus (Athias-Henriot, 1961)
- Rhodacarellus citri Fouly, 1992
- Rhodacarellus corniculatus Willmann, 1935
- Rhodacarellus epigynialis Sheals, 1956
- Rhodacarellus francescae Athias-Henriot, 1961
- Rhodacarellus iraniensis Castilho, Jalaeian & de Moraes, 2012
- Rhodacarellus kreuzi Karg, 1965
- Rhodacarellus liuzhiyingi Ma, 1995
- Rhodacarellus maxidactylus Karg, 2000
- Rhodacarellus moneli Solomon, 1978
- Rhodacarellus montanus Shcherbak, 1980
- Rhodacarellus perspicuus Halašková, 1959
- Rhodacarellus shandongensis Ma, 2008
- Rhodacarellus silesiacus Willmann, 1936
- Rhodacarellus subterraneus Willmann, 1935
- Rhodacarellus tadchikistanicus Shcherbak, 1980
- Rhodacarellus tebeenus Hafez & Nasr, 1979
- Rhodacarellus unicus Karg, 2000
- Rhodacarellus vervacti (Athias-Henriot, 1961)
- Rhodacarellus yalujiangensis Ma, 2003
