= Phymorhynchus starmeri =

Scientific classification
- Kingdom: Animalia
- Phylum: Mollusca
- Class: Gastropoda
- Subclass: Caenogastropoda
- Order: Neogastropoda
- Superfamily: Conoidea
- Family: Raphitomidae
- Genus: Phymorhynchus
- Species: P. starmeri

Binomial name
- Phymorhynchus starmeri Okutani & Ohta, 1993

Species of gastropod

Phymorhynchus starmeri is a species of sea snail, a marine gastropod mollusk in the family Raphitomidae.

== Description ==
The length of the shell attains 65.4 mm, its diameter is 36.1 mm.

== Distribution ==
This marine species was found on hydrothermal vents in the Fiji Basin.

== Discovery ==
The species was discovered in 1993 by T. Okutani and S. Ohta, both Japanese malacologists.
