= Pennarhodeus =

Scientific classification
- Kingdom: Animalia
- Phylum: Arthropoda
- Subphylum: Chelicerata
- Class: Arachnida
- Order: Mesostigmata
- Family: Rhodacaridae
- Genus: Pennarhodeus; Karg, 2000

Genus of mites

Pennarhodeus is a genus of mites in the family Rhodacaridae.

== Species ==
- Pennarhodeus brevipennatus Karg, 2000
- Pennarhodeus decoris Karg, 2000
- Pennarhodeus pennatus Karg, 2000
- Pennarhodeus turris Karg, 2000
