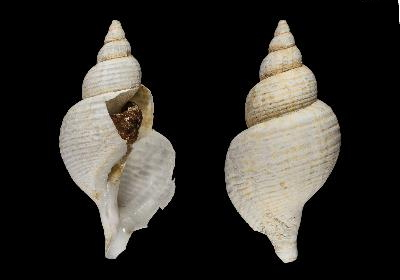
- Shell of Phymorhynchus coseli (holotype at MNHN, Paris)

Scientific classification
- Kingdom: Animalia
- Phylum: Mollusca
- Class: Gastropoda
- Subclass: Caenogastropoda
- Order: Neogastropoda
- Superfamily: Conoidea
- Family: Raphitomidae
- Genus: Phymorhynchus
- Species: P. coseli

Binomial name
- Phymorhynchus coseli Warén & Bouchet, 2009

= Phymorhynchus coseli =

Species of gastropod

Phymorhynchus coseli is a species of sea snail, a marine gastropod mollusk in the family Raphitomidae.

== Description ==
The length of the shell attains 64 mm.

== Distribution ==
This species occurs at methane seeps in deep water in the Congo River.
