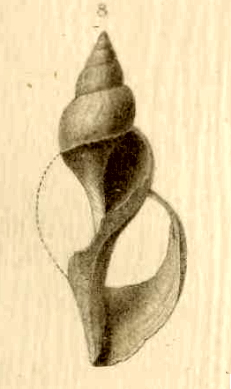
- Original image of a shell of Phymorhynchus alberti

Scientific classification
- Kingdom: Animalia
- Phylum: Mollusca
- Class: Gastropoda
- Subclass: Caenogastropoda
- Order: Neogastropoda
- Superfamily: Conoidea
- Family: Raphitomidae
- Genus: Phymorhynchus
- Species: P. alberti

Binomial name
- Phymorhynchus alberti (Dautzenberg & Fischer, 1906)

Synonyms
- Bathybela (Bathypota) alberti Nordsieck, 1977; Bela alberti (Dautzenberg & Fischer, 1906); Pleurotoma alberti (basionym) Dautzenberg & Fischer, 1906; Pleurotoma (Pleurotomella) alberti Dautzenberg & H. Fischer, 1906

= Phymorhynchus alberti =

Species of mollusc

Phymorhynchus alberti is a species of sea snail, a marine gastropod mollusk in the family Raphitomidae.

== Description ==
The length of the shell attains 6.6 mm, its diameter 3 mm.

The large, white shell is extremely thin and fragile. It consists of 7 convex whorls, slightly flattened upwards. The shell shows longitudinally flattened folds that become, at the base of the body whorl, decurrent ribs that also remain superficial. The aperture is large, measuring half the total length of the shell. It is angular at the top and slightly retracted at its base, forming an open, very short siphonal canal. The columella is slightly bent and twisted and shows a shining callus. The outer lip is simple and sharp. It shows on top a large and rather deep sinus.

== Distribution ==
This marine species occurs off the Cape Verdes.
