= Binodacarus =

Scientific classification
- Kingdom: Animalia
- Phylum: Arthropoda
- Subphylum: Chelicerata
- Class: Arachnida
- Order: Mesostigmata
- Infraorder: Gamasina
- Superfamily: Rhodacaroidea
- Family: Rhodacaridae
- Genus: Binodacarus; Castilho & Moraes, 2010
- Species: B. brasiliensis

Binomial name
- Binodacarus brasiliensis Castilho & Moraes, 2010

Genus of mites

Binodacarus is a genus of mites in the family Rhodacaridae. There is a single described species in this genus, Binodacarus brasiliensis.
