= Phymorhynchus oculatus =

Scientific classification
- Kingdom: Animalia
- Phylum: Mollusca
- Class: Gastropoda
- Subclass: Caenogastropoda
- Order: Neogastropoda
- Superfamily: Conoidea
- Family: Raphitomidae
- Genus: Phymorhynchus
- Species: P. oculatus

Binomial name
- Phymorhynchus oculatus S.-Q. Zhang & S.-P. Zhang, 2017

Species of gastropod

Phymorhynchus oculatus is a species of sea snail, a marine gastropod mollusk in the family Raphitomidae.

== Distribution ==
This marine species was found on a hydrothermal vent in the Manus Back-Arc Basin, Papua New Guinea
