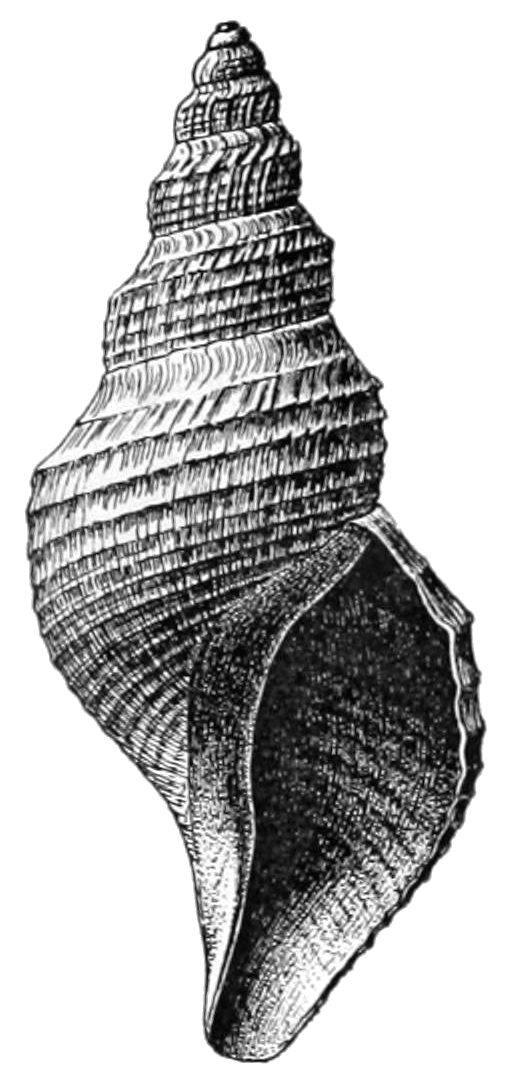
- shell of Phymorhynchus castaneus

Scientific classification
- Kingdom: Animalia
- Phylum: Mollusca
- Class: Gastropoda
- Subclass: Caenogastropoda
- Order: Neogastropoda
- Superfamily: Conoidea
- Family: Raphitomidae
- Genus: Phymorhynchus; W. H. Dall, 1908

Type species
- Clathurella modesta Angas, 1877

Species
- See text

= Phymorhynchus =

Genus of gastropods

Phymorhynchus is a genus of sea snails, marine gastropod mollusks in the family Raphitomidae.

== Description ==
The fusiform shell is thin, smooth, or spirally sculptured. The axial sculpture is less conspicuous. The siphonal canal is nearly obsolete. The columella and outer lip is simple. The anal sulcus is wide, shallow and close to the suture. The animal is blind, with a distinct muzzle into which the proboscis is retracted. The operculum is wanting. Type: Pleurotomella castanea Dall, 1896

== Species ==
Species within the genus Phymorhynchus include:

- † Phymorhynchus agina (Olsson, 1942)
- Phymorhynchus alberti (Dautzenberg & Fischer, 1906)
- Phymorhynchus buccinoides Okutani, Fujikura & Sasaki, 1993
- Phymorhynchus carinatus Waren & Bouchet, 2001
- Phymorhynchus castaneus (Dall, 1896) - type species
- Phymorhynchus chevreuxi (Dautzenberg & Fischer, 1897)
- Phymorhynchus cingulatus (Dall, 1890)
- Phymorhynchus cingulatus Warén & Bouchet, 2009: secondary homonym of Phymorhynchus cingulatus (Dall, 1890)
- Phymorhynchus clarinda (Dall, 1908)
- Phymorhynchus coseli Warén & Bouchet, 2009
- Phymorhynchus hyfifluxi Beck, L., 1996
- Phymorhynchus major Waren & Bouchet, 2001
- Phymorhynchus moskalevi Sysoev & Kantor, 1995
- Phymorhynchus oculatus Zhang, S-Q. & Zhang, S-P. 2017
- Phymorhynchus ovatus Warén & Bouchet, 2001
- Phymorhynchus speciosus Olsson, 1971
- Phymorhynchus starmeri Okutani & Ohta, 1993
- Phymorhynchus sulciferus (Bush, 1893)
- Phymorhynchus turris Okutani & Iwasaki, 2003
- Phymorhynchus wareni Sysoev & Kantor, 1995
- Phymorhynchus n. sp. "CIR"
- Phymorhynchus n. sp. "SWIR"

Species brought into synonymy

- Phymorhynchus argeta (Dall, 1908): synonym of Xanthodaphne argeta (Dall, 1890)
- Phymorhynchus oceanica (Dall, 1908): synonym of Cryptomella oceanica (Dall, 1908)
- Phymorhynchus oceanicus (Dall, 1908): synonym of Cryptomella oceanica (Dall, 1908)
- Phymorhynchus tenuis Okutani, 1966 : synonym of Pararetifusus tenuis (Okutani, 1966) (original combination)

A new species described by Warén & Bouchet in 2009 under the name Phymorhynchus cingulata from methane seeps in deep water off the Congo River is a secondary homonym. It will be newly described under different name in the future.
