= Rhodacaropsis =

Scientific classification
- Kingdom: Animalia
- Phylum: Arthropoda
- Subphylum: Chelicerata
- Class: Arachnida
- Order: Mesostigmata
- Family: Rhodacaridae
- Genus: Rhodacaropsis; Willmann, 1935

Genus of mites

Rhodacaropsis is a genus of mites in the family Rhodacaridae. There are about six described species in Rhodacaropsis.

== Species ==
These six species belong to the genus Rhodacaropsis:

- Rhodacaropsis attenuatus (Loots, 1969)
- Rhodacaropsis botosaneanui (Petrova & Beron, 1973)
- Rhodacaropsis cheungae Luxton, 1992
- Rhodacaropsis cubanus (Petrova & Beron, 1973)
- Rhodacaropsis inexpectatus Willmann, 1935
- Rhodacaropsis ponticus Shcherbak, 1980
