= Phymorhynchus hyfifluxi =

Scientific classification
- Kingdom: Animalia
- Phylum: Mollusca
- Class: Gastropoda
- Subclass: Caenogastropoda
- Order: Neogastropoda
- Superfamily: Conoidea
- Family: Raphitomidae
- Genus: Phymorhynchus
- Species: P. hyfifluxi

Binomial name
- Phymorhynchus hyfifluxi Beck, L., 1996

Species of gastropod

Phymorhynchus hyfifluxi is a species of sea snail, a marine gastropod mollusk in the family Raphitomidae.

== Distribution ==
This marine species has been found on hydrothermal vents in the north Fiji Basin.
