= Minirhodacarellus =

Scientific classification
- Kingdom: Animalia
- Phylum: Arthropoda
- Subphylum: Chelicerata
- Class: Arachnida
- Order: Mesostigmata
- Family: Rhodacaridae
- Genus: Minirhodacarellus; Shcherbak, 1980
- Species: M. minimus

Binomial name
- Minirhodacarellus minimus (Karg, 1961)

Genus of mites

Minirhodacarellus is a genus of mites in the family Rhodacaridae. There is a single species in this genus, Minirhodacarellus minimus.
