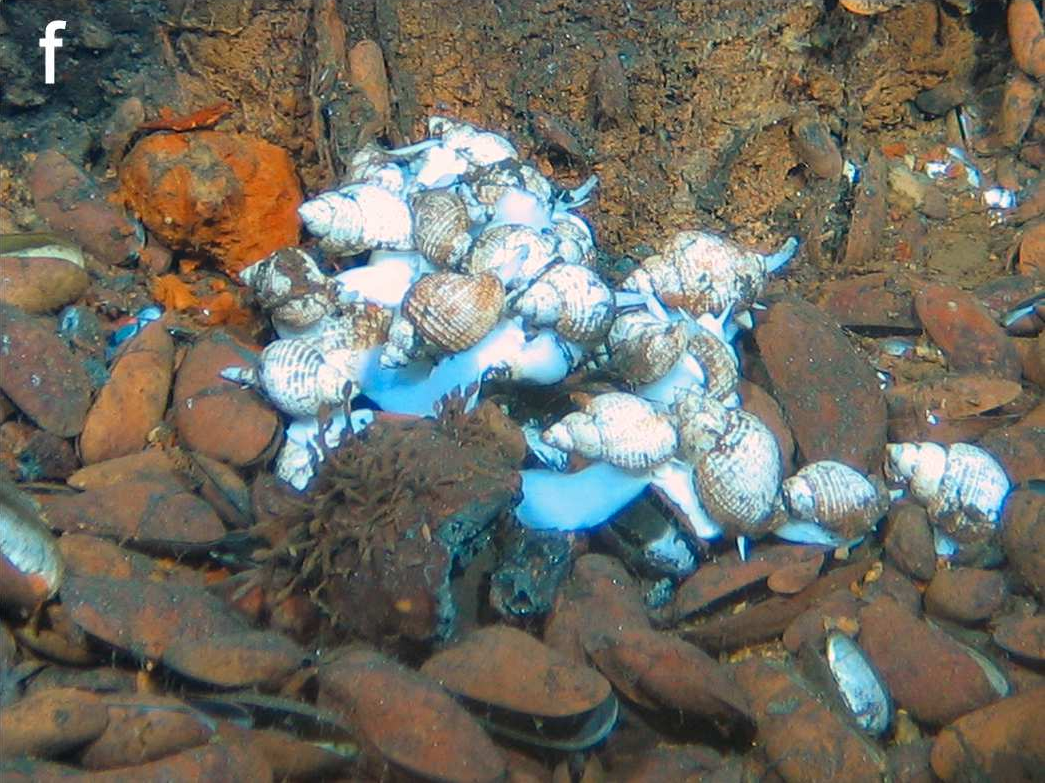
- Phymorhynchus n. sp. "SWIR" and dead Bathymodiolus marisindicus mussel shells at base of active vent chimney at Longqi vent field

Scientific classification
- Kingdom: Animalia
- Phylum: Mollusca
- Class: Gastropoda
- Subclass: Caenogastropoda
- Order: Neogastropoda
- Family: Raphitomidae
- Genus: Phymorhynchus
- Species: P. n. sp. "SWIR"

Binomial name
- Phymorhynchus n. sp. "SWIR" (nomen nudum)

= Phymorhynchus n. sp. "SWIR" =

Species of gastropod

Phymorhynchus n. sp. "SWIR" is a species of as-yet-undescribed (as of 2016) sea snail, a marine gastropod mollusk in the family Raphitomidae.

== Distribution ==
This species is known only from Longqi vent field in Southwest Indian Ridge.
