= Multidentorhodacarus =

Scientific classification
- Kingdom: Animalia
- Phylum: Arthropoda
- Subphylum: Chelicerata
- Class: Arachnida
- Order: Mesostigmata
- Family: Rhodacaridae
- Genus: Multidentorhodacarus; Karg, 2000

Genus of mites

Multidentorhodacarus is a genus of mites in the family Rhodacaridae. There are about 16 described species in Multidentorhodacarus.

== Species ==
These 16 species belong to the genus Multidentorhodacarus:

- Multidentorhodacarus ananasi (Ryke, 1962)
- Multidentorhodacarus angustacuminis (Karg, 1998)
- Multidentorhodacarus brevicuspidis Karg, 2000
- Multidentorhodacarus brevisetosus Karg, 2000
- Multidentorhodacarus denticulatus (Berlese, 1920)
- Multidentorhodacarus differentis Karg & Schorlemmer, 2009
- Multidentorhodacarus minutocorpus (Karg, 1998)
- Multidentorhodacarus paulista Castilho & Moraes, 2010
- Multidentorhodacarus pennacornutus Karg, 2000
- Multidentorhodacarus ruwenzoriensis (Loots, 1969)
- Multidentorhodacarus sogdianus (Shcherbak, 1980)
- Multidentorhodacarus squamosus Karg, 2000
- Multidentorhodacarus sublapideus (Ryke, 1962)
- Multidentorhodacarus tertius (Karg, 1996)
- Multidentorhodacarus thysi (Jordaan, Loots & Theron, 1988)
- Multidentorhodacarus triramulus (Karg, 1998)
