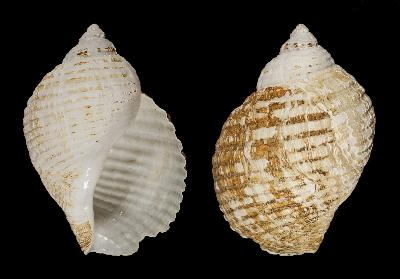
- Shell of Phymorhynchus ovatus (holotype in MNHN, Paris)

Scientific classification
- Kingdom: Animalia
- Phylum: Mollusca
- Class: Gastropoda
- Subclass: Caenogastropoda
- Order: Neogastropoda
- Superfamily: Conoidea
- Family: Raphitomidae
- Genus: Phymorhynchus
- Species: P. ovatus

Binomial name
- Phymorhynchus ovatus Waren & Bouchet, 2001

= Phymorhynchus ovatus =

Species of gastropod

Phymorhynchus ovatus is a species of sea snail, a marine gastropod mollusk in the family Raphitomidae.

== Description ==
The length of the shell attains 67 mm.

== Distribution ==
This species was found at the Logatchev site, Mid-Atlantic Ridge at a depth of 3,000 m.
