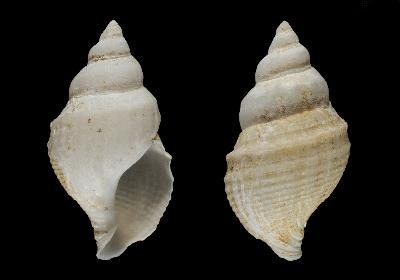
- Shell of Phymorhynchus carinatus (holotype in MNHN, Paris)

Scientific classification
- Kingdom: Animalia
- Phylum: Mollusca
- Class: Gastropoda
- Subclass: Caenogastropoda
- Order: Neogastropoda
- Superfamily: Conoidea
- Family: Raphitomidae
- Genus: Phymorhynchus
- Species: P. carinatus

Binomial name
- Phymorhynchus carinatus Waren & Bouchet, 2001

= Phymorhynchus carinatus =

Species of gastropod

Phymorhynchus carinatus is a species of sea snail, a marine gastropod mollusk in the family Raphitomidae.

== Description ==
The length of the shell attains 15 mm.

== Distribution ==
This bathyal species occurs on the Logatchev site of the Mid-Atlantic Ridge, at a depth of 3,000 m.
