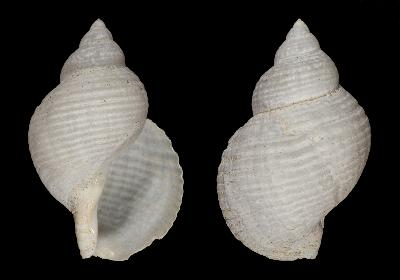
- Shell of Phymorhynchus major (holotype in MNHN, Paris)

Scientific classification
- Kingdom: Animalia
- Phylum: Mollusca
- Class: Gastropoda
- Subclass: Caenogastropoda
- Order: Neogastropoda
- Superfamily: Conoidea
- Family: Raphitomidae
- Genus: Phymorhynchus
- Species: P. major

Binomial name
- Phymorhynchus major Waren & Bouchet, 2001

= Phymorhynchus major =

Species of gastropod

Phymorhynchus major is a species of sea snail, a marine gastropod mollusk in the family Raphitomidae.

== Description ==
The length, often colored beige, of the shell attains 72 mm.

== Distribution ==
This species was found on the East Pacific Rise at a depth of 2,500 m.
