= Paragamasellevans =

Scientific classification
- Kingdom: Animalia
- Phylum: Arthropoda
- Subphylum: Chelicerata
- Class: Arachnida
- Order: Mesostigmata
- Family: Rhodacaridae
- Genus: Paragamasellevans; Loots & Ryke, 1968

Genus of mites

Paragamasellevans is a genus of mites in the family Rhodacaridae. There are at least two described species in Paragamasellevans.

== Species ==
These two species belong to the genus Paragamasellevans:

- Paragamasellevans michaeli Loots & Ryke, 1968
- Paragamasellevans vandenbergi Loots & Ryke, 1968
