= Mediorhodacarus =

Scientific classification
- Kingdom: Animalia
- Phylum: Arthropoda
- Subphylum: Chelicerata
- Class: Arachnida
- Order: Mesostigmata
- Family: Rhodacaridae
- Genus: Mediorhodacarus; Shcherbak, 1976
- Species: M. tetranodulosus

Binomial name
- Mediorhodacarus tetranodulosus Shcherbak, 1976

Genus of mites

Mediorhodacarus is a genus of mites in the family Rhodacaridae. There is a single species in this genus, Mediorhodacarus tetranodulosus.
