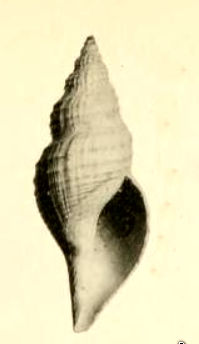
- Original image of a shell of Phymorhynchus chevreuxi

Scientific classification
- Kingdom: Animalia
- Phylum: Mollusca
- Class: Gastropoda
- Subclass: Caenogastropoda
- Order: Neogastropoda
- Superfamily: Conoidea
- Family: Raphitomidae
- Genus: Phymorhynchus
- Species: P. chevreuxi

Binomial name
- Phymorhynchus chevreuxi (Dautzenberg & Fischer, 1897)

Synonyms
- Pleurotoma chevreuxi Dautzenberg & Fischer, 1897; Pleurotoma (Pleurotomella) chevreuxi Dautzenberg, 1927; Pleurotomella (Azorita (?)) chevreuxi Nordsieck, 1968

= Phymorhynchus chevreuxi =

Species of gastropod

Phymorhynchus chevreuxi is a species of sea snail, a marine gastropod mollusk in the family Raphitomidae.

== Description ==
The white, fusiform shell is not very solid. The turreted spire is fairly high. The shell contains seven convex whorls, separated by a well-marked suture. The only remaining whorl of the protoconch is adorned at the top with arched longitudinal costules and, below, with a very fine and tight diagonally cancellated sculpture. The six subsequent whorls are adorned with 4 or 5 decurrent, distant cords, narrow, well-protruding and with growth lines strongly arcuated on the infra-sutural area and almost perpendicular below this. The growth lines, crossing the funicles, form transversely undeveloped tubercles. The body whorl, which occupies 3/4 of the total height, shows 26 decurrent cords. Those located below the periphery and on the siphonal canal, are much weaker and closer together than the others. The growth lines are also more irregular and weaker on this whorl than on the others. The aperture is elongated and a little angular in the top. It ends in an open and rather elongated siphonal canal. The columella is almost upright, attenuated and elliptical at the base. The outer lip is arcuate and acute.

== Distribution ==
This marine species occurs off the Azores at a depth of 1,600 m.
