= Phymorhynchus moskalevi =

Scientific classification
- Kingdom: Animalia
- Phylum: Mollusca
- Class: Gastropoda
- Subclass: Caenogastropoda
- Order: Neogastropoda
- Superfamily: Conoidea
- Family: Raphitomidae
- Genus: Phymorhynchus
- Species: P. moskalevi

Binomial name
- Phymorhynchus moskalevi Sysoev & Kantor, 1995

Species of gastropod

Phymorhynchus moskalevi is a species of sea snail, a marine gastropod mollusk in the family Raphitomidae.

This species has been described from hydrothermal vents in 1995.

== Description ==
The length of the shell attains 39 mm.

== Distribution ==
This species occurs on the Mid-Atlantic Ridge.
