= Pararhodacarus =

Scientific classification
- Kingdom: Animalia
- Phylum: Arthropoda
- Subphylum: Chelicerata
- Class: Arachnida
- Order: Mesostigmata
- Infraorder: Gamasina
- Superfamily: Rhodacaroidea
- Family: Rhodacaridae
- Genus: Pararhodacarus; Jordaan, Loots & Theron, 1988
- Species: P. intermedius

Binomial name
- Pararhodacarus intermedius Jordaan, Loots & Theron, 1988

Genus of mites

Pararhodacarus is a genus of mites in the family Rhodacaridae.

== Species ==
- Pararhodacarus intermedius L. C. Jordaan, G. C. Loots & P. D. Theron, 1988
