= Interrhodeus =

Scientific classification
- Kingdom: Animalia
- Phylum: Arthropoda
- Subphylum: Chelicerata
- Class: Arachnida
- Order: Mesostigmata
- Family: Rhodacaridae
- Genus: Interrhodeus; Karg, 2000
- Species: I. brevicornus

Binomial name
- Interrhodeus brevicornus Karg, 2000

Genus of mites

Interrhodeus is a genus of mites in the family Rhodacaridae. There is a single species in this genus, Interrhodeus brevicornus.
