= Phymorhynchus buccinoides =

Scientific classification
- Kingdom: Animalia
- Phylum: Mollusca
- Class: Gastropoda
- Subclass: Caenogastropoda
- Order: Neogastropoda
- Superfamily: Conoidea
- Family: Raphitomidae
- Genus: Phymorhynchus
- Species: P. buccinoides

Binomial name
- Phymorhynchus buccinoides Okutani, Fujikura & Sasaki, 1993

Species of Gastropoda

Phymorhynchus buccinoides is a species of sea snail, a marine gastropod mollusk in the family Raphitomidae.

The Japanese name of this species is Tsubunari-shajiku.

== Distribution ==
The type locality is off Hatsushima, Sagami Bay, 35°00.2' N, 139°13.5' E, Japan in depth 1160 m.

There is no known other locality up to 2005.

It lives in seeps.
