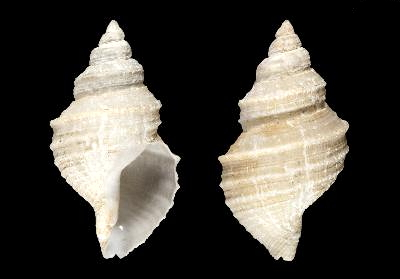
- Original image of a shell of Phymorhynchus cingulatus

Scientific classification
- Kingdom: Animalia
- Phylum: Mollusca
- Class: Gastropoda
- Subclass: Caenogastropoda
- Order: Neogastropoda
- Superfamily: Conoidea
- Family: Raphitomidae
- Genus: Phymorhynchus
- Species: P. cingulatus

Binomial name
- Phymorhynchus cingulatus (Dall, 1890)

Synonyms
- Daphnella cingulata Cossmann, 1896; Mangilia (Pleurotomella) cingulata Dall, 1890 (basionym); Mangilia cingulata Dall, 1890 (original combination); Pleurotomella (Phymorhynchus) cingulatus (Dall, 1890)

= Phymorhynchus cingulatus =

Species of gastropod

Phymorhynchus cingulatus, common name the ringed turrid, is a species of sea snail, a marine gastropod mollusk in the family Raphitomidae.

== Description ==
The length of the shell attains 73 mm, its diameter 30 mm.

The large, fusiform shell is of a rich reddish-brown. It is deepest on the columella, with a closely adherent, very thin, polished epidermis. The shell contains seven whorls, without the protoconch, which is lost in the specimen, while the outer coat of the apical whorls is much eroded. The whorls are full and rounded. The suture is distinct, not appressed or channeled. The transverse sculpture consists only of fine inconspicuous lines of growth. The spiral sculpture consists of two sorts: first, a fine, sharp, slightly irregular striation, which covers the whole surface; secondly, of revolving elevated cinguli, of which three on the periphery are more widely and deeply separated and more elevated than the others. These three have interspaces equal to or wider than themselves. On the body whorl in front of the periphery the cinguli are flat-topped little elevated wide bands with narrower interspaces, this sculpture becoming obscure toward the siphonal canal. Above the periphery is one well-marked cingulum slightly turrettini the whorl which inclines from it to the suture in a flattened manner. The aperture is pointed in front, wider behind. The columella is simple, perfectly straight, anteriorly attenuated. The body and columella show a thin dark brown glaze. The outer lip is very thin, sharp, crenulated by the outside sculpture, which also grooves the interior. The notch is shallow, wide; fasciole hardly visible; canal short, wide, hardly differentiated and straight.

== Distribution ==
This marine species occurs off Ecuador and the Galapagos Islands.
