= Protogamasellopsis =

Scientific classification
- Kingdom: Animalia
- Phylum: Arthropoda
- Subphylum: Chelicerata
- Class: Arachnida
- Order: Mesostigmata
- Family: Rhodacaridae
- Genus: Protogamasellopsis; Evans & Purvis, 1987

Genus of mites

Protogamasellopsis is a genus of mites in the family Rhodacaridae. There are about seven described species in Protogamasellopsis.

== Species ==
These seven species belong to the genus Protogamasellopsis:

- Protogamasellopsis corticalis Evans & Purvis, 1987
- Protogamasellopsis dioscorus (Manson, 1972)
- Protogamasellopsis granulosus Karg, 1994
- Protogamasellopsis leptosomae Karg, 1994
- Protogamasellopsis posnaniensis Wisniewski & Hirschmann, 1991
- Protogamasellopsis praeendopodalis Karg, 1994
- Protogamasellopsis transversus Karg, 2000
