= Phymorhynchus turris =

Scientific classification
- Kingdom: Animalia
- Phylum: Mollusca
- Class: Gastropoda
- Subclass: Caenogastropoda
- Order: Neogastropoda
- Superfamily: Conoidea
- Family: Raphitomidae
- Genus: Phymorhynchus
- Species: P. turris

Binomial name
- Phymorhynchus turris Okutani & Iwasaki, 2003

Species of gastropod

Phymorhynchus turris is a species of sea snail, a marine gastropod mollusk in the family Raphitomidae.

The Japanese name of this species is Seitaka-watazoko-shajiku.

== Distribution ==
The type locality of this marine species is off Cape Muroto, Nankai Trough, 32°21.3' N, 134°32.0' E, Japan, in hydrothermal vents at 3540 m.
