= Rhodacarus =

Scientific classification
- Kingdom: Animalia
- Phylum: Arthropoda
- Subphylum: Chelicerata
- Class: Arachnida
- Order: Mesostigmata
- Family: Rhodacaridae
- Genus: Rhodacarus; Oudemans, 1902

Genus of mites

Rhodacarus is a genus of mites in the family Rhodacaridae. There are more than 20 described species in Rhodacarus.

== Species ==
These 29 species belong to the genus Rhodacarus:

- Rhodacarus aequalis Karg, 1971
- Rhodacarus agrestis Karg, 1971
- Rhodacarus angustiformis Willmann, 1951
- Rhodacarus berrisfordi Loots, 1969
- Rhodacarus calcarulatus Berlese, 1920
- Rhodacarus clavulatus Athias-Henriot, 1961
- Rhodacarus coronatus Berlese, 1920
- Rhodacarus cuneatus Athias-Henriot, 1961
- Rhodacarus fatrensis Kalúz, 1994
- Rhodacarus furmanae Shcherbak, 1975
- Rhodacarus gracilis Shcherbak, 1980
- Rhodacarus haarlovi Shcherbak, 1977
- Rhodacarus laureti Athias-Henriot, 1961
- Rhodacarus longisetosus Shcherbak, 1980
- Rhodacarus mandibularis Berlese, 1920
- Rhodacarus mandibularosimilis Shcherbak & Kadite, 1979
- Rhodacarus marksae Domrow, 1957
- Rhodacarus matatlanticae Castilho & Moraes, 2010
- Rhodacarus olgae Shcherbak, 1975
- Rhodacarus pallidus Hull, 1918
- Rhodacarus reconditus Athias-Henriot, 1961
- Rhodacarus rhodacaropsis Ryke, 1962
- Rhodacarus roseus Oudemans, 1902
- Rhodacarus salarius Karg, 1993
- Rhodacarus solimani Fouly & Nawar, 1990
- Rhodacarus strenzkei Willmann, 1957
- Rhodacarus tribaculatus Athias-Henriot, 1961
- Rhodacarus willmanni Karg, 1993
- Rhodacarus zaheri Fouly & Nawar, 1990
