= Turris (disambiguation) =

Turris, Latin for "tower", is a genus of sea snails.

It may also refer to:

- Turris Libisonis, the Roman name for Porto Torres in northern Sardinia
- Turris, a genus of sea snails
- Turris Omnia, an open source hardware network router
- S.S. Turris Calcio, an Italian football club
- Kyle Turris (born 1989), a Canadian ice hockey player
