= Afrogamasellus =

Scientific classification
- Kingdom: Animalia
- Phylum: Arthropoda
- Subphylum: Chelicerata
- Class: Arachnida
- Order: Mesostigmata
- Family: Rhodacaridae
- Genus: Afrogamasellus; Loots & Ryke, 1968

Genus of mites

Afrogamasellus is a genus of mites in the family Rhodacaridae.

== Species ==
These 24 species belong to the genus Afrogamasellus:

- Afrogamasellus celisi Loots, 1969
- Afrogamasellus congoensis (Ryke & Loots, 1966)
- Afrogamasellus evansi Loots, 1969
- Afrogamasellus franzi (Ryke & Loots, 1966)
- Afrogamasellus franzoides Hurlbutt, 1974
- Afrogamasellus isthmus Hurlbutt, 1974
- Afrogamasellus kahusiensis Loots, 1969
- Afrogamasellus kilimanjaroensis (Ryke & Loots, 1966)
- Afrogamasellus latigynia Hurlbutt, 1974
- Afrogamasellus lokelei Van Daele, 1976
- Afrogamasellus lootsi Hurlbutt, 1974
- Afrogamasellus luberoensis luberoensis Loots, 1968
- Afrogamasellus lyamunguensis Hurlbutt, 1974
- Afrogamasellus maskamensis (Ryke & Loots, 1966)
- Afrogamasellus mitigatus (Berlese, 1923)
- Afrogamasellus muhiensis Loots, 1969
- Afrogamasellus nyinabitabaensis Loots, 1969
- Afrogamasellus paratruncatus Hurlbutt, 1974
- Afrogamasellus quadrisigillatus (Berlese, 1916)
- Afrogamasellus rugegensis Loots, 1969
- Afrogamasellus tetrastigma (Berlese, 1916)
- Afrogamasellus truncatus Hurlbutt, 1974
- Afrogamasellus uluguruensis Hurlbutt, 1974
- Afrogamasellus uviraensis (Ryke & Loots, 1966)
