= Rhodacaridae =

Scientific classification
- Kingdom: Animalia
- Phylum: Arthropoda
- Subphylum: Chelicerata
- Class: Arachnida
- Order: Mesostigmata
- Infraorder: Gamasina
- Superfamily: Rhodacaroidea
- Family: Rhodacaridae; Evans, 1957

Family of mites

Rhodacaridae is a family of mites in the order Mesostigmata.

== Genera ==
- Afrodacarellus Hulbutt, 1974
- Afrogamasellus Loots & Ryke, 1968
- Binodacarus Castilho & Moraes, 2010
- Interrhodeus Karg, 2000
- Mediorhodacarus Shcherbak, 1976
- Minirhodacarellus Shcherbak, 1980
- Multidentorhodacarus Karg, 2000
- Paragamasellevans Loots & Ryke, 1968
- Pararhodacarus Jordaan, Loots & Theron, 1988
- Pennarhodeus Karg, 2000
- Poropodalius Karg, 2000
- Protogamasellopsis Evans & Purvis, 1987
- Rhodacarellus Willmann, 1935
- Rhodacaropsis Willmann, 1935
- Rhodacarus Oudemans, 1902

== Habitat ==
Rhodacaridae live in soil and dead organic matter on soil, as well as in mosses, lichens and rodent nests.
