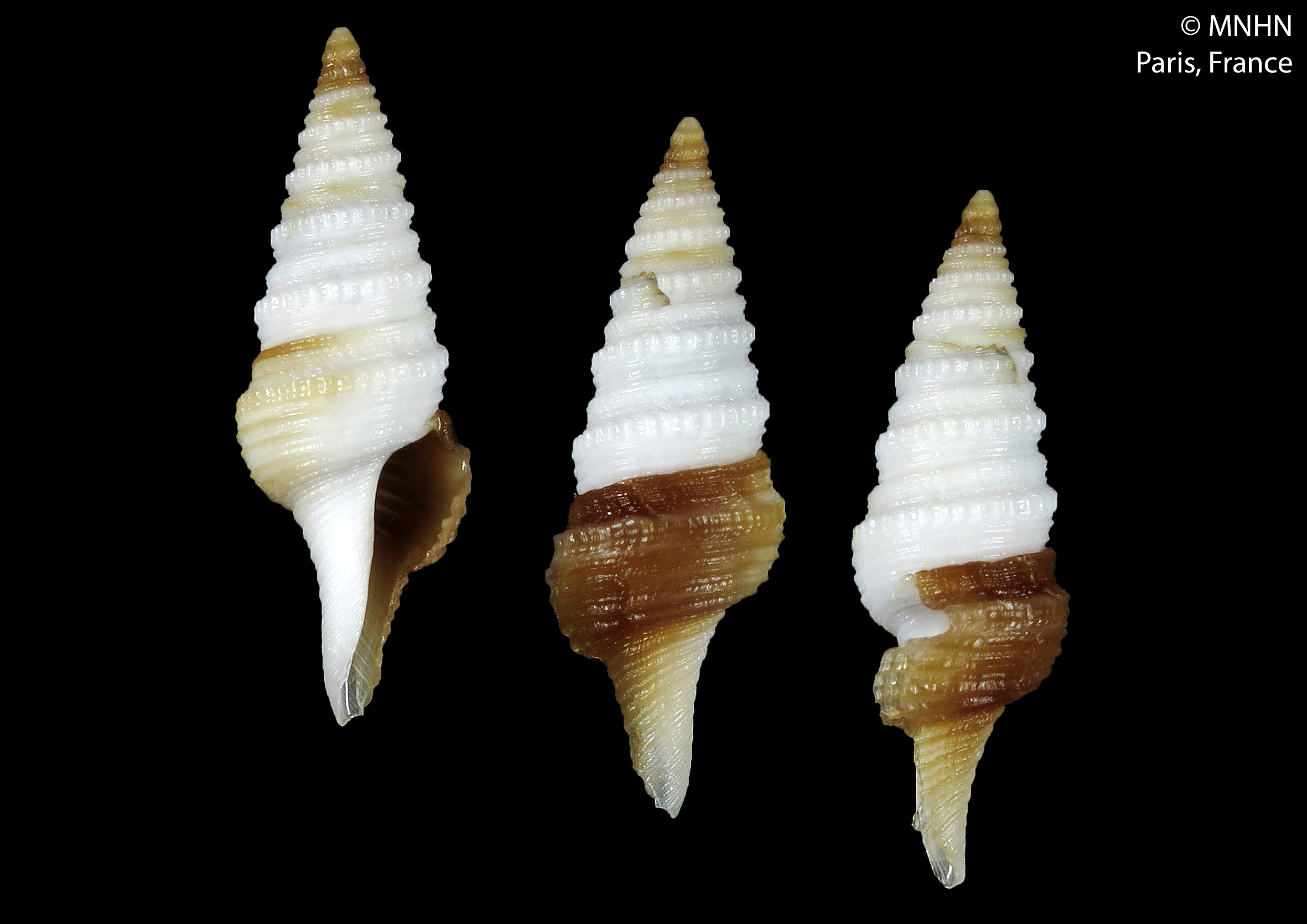
- shell of Gemmula contrasta (holotype at MNHN, Paris)

Scientific classification
- Kingdom: Animalia
- Phylum: Mollusca
- Class: Gastropoda
- Subclass: Caenogastropoda
- Order: Neogastropoda
- Superfamily: Conoidea
- Family: Turridae
- Genus: Gemmula; Weinkauff, 1875

Type species
- Pleurotoma gemmata Hinds, 1843

Species
- See text

Synonyms
- Eugemmula Iredale, 1931; Gemmula (Gemmula) Weinkauf, 1875; Pleurotoma (Gemmula) Weinkauff, 1875 (original rank); Turris (Gemmula) Weinkauf, 1875

= Gemmula =

Genus of gastropods

Gemmula, common name the gem turrids, is a genus of sea snails, marine gastropod mollusks in the family Turridae, the turrids.

These snails have been recorded as fossils from the Paleocene to the Quaternary (from 66.043 to 0.012 Ma). Fossils have been found all over the world.

This genus is still regarded as paraphyletic and was revised in 2024. A high number of undescribed species are estimated to belong to Gemmula. Since independent “Gemmula-like” lineages are distributed all over the turrid tree, a revision of Gemmula would entail again a complete revision of the family Turridae.

This revision has been made in 2024 as part of the generic revision of the Recent Turridae. Gemmula has been split up in 10 new genera.

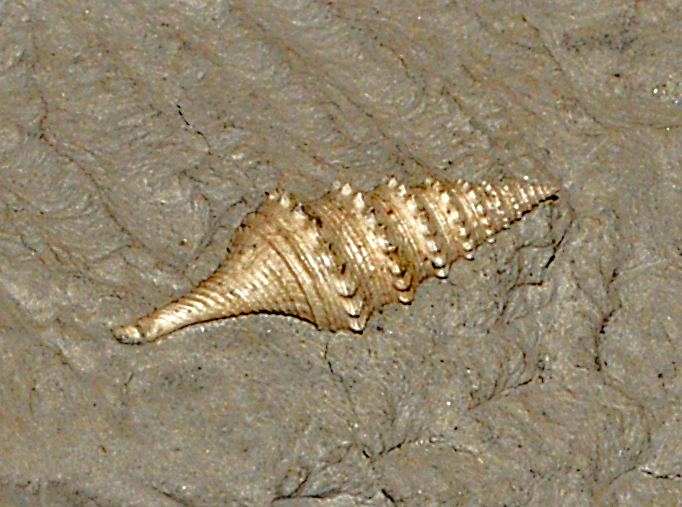
Fossil shell of Gemmula rotata from Pliocene

They are venomous with disulfide-rich polypeptides in their venom ducts. These bioactive peptides are likely to become a resource for novel pharmacologically active compounds

== Habitat and feeding habits ==
The snails in this genus occur mostly in deeper tropical waters at depths between 50 and 500m. Because of these deep habitats, little is known about their feeding habits.

== Taxonomy ==
The Gemmula clade is more closely related to the clades Xenuroturris, Turris and Lophiotoma than to the other clades in the former subfamily Turrinae.

== Description ==
The fusiform shell resembles Drillia, but with a thin and simple outer lip without an anterior sulcus, and the inner lip usually simple, hardly callous. The protoconch is polygyrate and axially costate. There are three or four embryonal whorls, the two upper ones smooth, upright, the others longitudinally ribbed. The sculpture is most emphasized in a spiral direction, often with a prominent beaded keel at or in front of the anal fasciole.The rather long siphonal canal is narrow and tapering, sometimes curved. The sinus is straight, more or less narrow and long, terminating in a nodulous peripheral keel that is gemmate throughout. Type species : Pleurotoma gemmata Hinds, 1843

The bead-row of the fasciole readily distinguishes this genus from related forms. Between the smooth protoconch and the adult whorls two or three whorls intervene with descrepant sculpture of fine arcuate longitudinal riblets.

As expected from venomous species, these species have a toxoglosson radula (formula 1 + 0 +1 + 0 + 1) with a central tooth that characterizes this genus.

== Species ==
The genus Gemmula is the largest genus in the former subfamily Turrinae. Species within the genus Gemmula include:

- Gemmula alwyni Kilburn, 2005
- † Gemmula antedenticulata Lozouet, 2017
- † Gemmula bearrizensis Pacaud, 2021
- † Gemmula bimarginata (Suter, 1917)
- † Gemmula birmanica Vredenburg, 1921
- † Gemmula brevirostris Lozouet, 2017
- Gemmula chinoi Stahlschmidt, Poppe & Tagaro, 2018
- † Gemmula clifdenensis Powell, 1942
- Gemmula closterion Sysoev, 1997
- Gemmula concinna (Dunker, 1871)
- Gemmula contrasta Stahlschmidt, Poppe & Tagaro, 2018
- † Gemmula denticula (Basterot, 1825)
- † Gemmula disjuncta Laws, 1936
- Gemmula ducalis (Thiele, 1925)
- † Gemmula duplex (Suter, 1917)
- Gemmula flata Baoquan Li & Xinzheng Li, 2008
- † Gemmula funiculosa Lozouet, 2017
- † Gemmula garviei Tracey & Craig, 2019
- Gemmula grandigyrata Baoquan Li & Xinzheng Li, 2008
- Gemmula granosus (Helbling, 1779)
- Gemmula hindsiana Berry, 1958
- Gemmula husamaru (Nomura, 1940)
- Gemmula interpolata Powell, 1967
- † Gemmula kaiparaensis (P. Marshall, 1918)
- Gemmula kieneri (Doumet, 1840)
- † Gemmula lawsi Powell, 1942
- † Gemmula longwoodensis Powell, 1942
- Gemmula lordhoweensis Kantor & Sysoev, 1991
- Gemmula lululimi Olivera, 1999
- † Gemmula machapoorensis C.J. Maury, 1925
- † Gemmula margaritata (P. Marshall, 1919)
- Gemmula martini (Tesch, 1915)
- Gemmula mystica Simone, 2005
- † Gemmula obesa Lozouet, 2017
- Gemmula oliverai Stahlschmidt, Poppe & Tagaro, 2018
- † Gemmula orba Marwick, 1931
- † Gemmula ornata (P. Marshall, 1918)
- † Gemmula osca Pacaud, 2021
- † Gemmula parkinsonii (Sandberger, 1860)
- † Gemmula peraspera Marwick, 1931
- † Gemmula peyrerensis (Peyrot, 1931)
- † Gemmula polita (P. Marshall, 1919)
- Gemmula pseudostupa Y.-P. Cheng & C.-Y. Lee, 2011
- † Gemmula reticulata (P. Marshall, 1919)
- Gemmula rotata (Brocchi, 1814)
- † Gemmula samueli (Tenison Woods, 1879)
- † Gemmula sculpturata Harzhauser, Raven & Landau, 2018
- Gemmula sibogae (Schepman, 1913)
- Gemmula sibukoensis Powell, 1964
- Gemmula sikatunai Olivera, 2004
- Gemmula stupa Lee, 2001
- † Gemmula tuckeri Tracey & Craig, 2019
- Gemmula vagata (Smith E. A., 1895)
- † Gemmula waihaoensis Finlay, 1924
- Gemmula webberae Kilburn, 1975

== Synonyms ==
- Gemmula aethiopica (Thiele, 1925): synonym of Cryptogemma aethiopica (Thiele, 1925)
- Gemmula albina (Lamarck, 1822): synonym of Anisogemmula albina (Lamarck, 1822)
- Gemmula amabilis (Weinkauff, 1875): synonym of Eugemmula amabilis (Weinkauff, 1875)
- Gemmula ambara Olivera et al., 2008: synonym of Anisogemmula ambara (B. M. Olivera, Hillyard & Watkins, 2008)
- Gemmula bisinuata (Martens, 1901): synonym of Cryptogemma praesignis (E. A. Smith, 1895)
- Gemmula championi Kilburn, 1983: synonym of Eugemmula championi (Kilburn, 1983)
- Gemmula congener (Smith E. A., 1894): synonym of Oliveragemmula congener (E. A. Smith, 1894)
- Gemmula cosmoi (Sykes, 1930): synonym of Oliveragemmula cosmoi (Sykes, 1930)
- Gemmula damperierana Powell, 1964: synonym of Oliveragemmula dampierana (A. W. B. Powell, 1964)
- Gemmula diomedea Powell, 1964: synonym of Oliveragemmula diomedea (A. W. B. Powell, 1964)
- Gemmula fenestrata] Kosuge, 1990: synonym of Taylorigemmula fenestrata (Kosuge, 1990)
- Gemmula gemmulina (Martens, 1902): synonym of Kilburnigemmula gemmulina (E. von Martens, 1902)
- Gemmula gilchristi (Sowerby III, 1902): synonym of Oliveragemmula gilchristi (G. B. Sowerby III, 1902)
- Gemmula graeffei (Weinkauff, 1875): synonym of Anisogemmula graeffei (Weinkauff, 1875)
- Gemmula hastula (Reeve, 1843): synonym of Deceptigemmula hastula (Reeve, 1843)
- Gemmula hawleyi (Iredale, 1931): synonym of Eugemmula hawleyi Iredale, 1931
- Gemmula hombroni Hedley, 1922: synonym of Eugemmula hombroni (Hedley, 1922)
- Gemmula lisajoni Olivera, 1999: synonym of Anisogemmula lisajoni (B. M. Olivera, 1999)
- Gemmula luzonica (Powell, 1964): synonym of Cryptogemma aethiopica (Thiele, 1925)
- Gemmula microscelida (Dall, 1895): synonym of Cryptogemma praesignis (E. A. Smith, 1895)
- Gemmula monilifera (Pease, 1860): synonym of Eugemmula monilifera (Pease, 1860)
- Gemmula murrayi Powell, 1964: synonym of Oliveragemmula murrayi (A. W. B. Powell, 1964)
- Gemmula periscelida (Dall, 1889): synonym of Cryptogemma periscelida (Dall, 1889)
- Gemmula praesignis (Smith E. A., 1895): synonym of Cryptogemma praesignis (E. A. Smith, 1895)
- Gemmula pseudogranosa (Nomura, 1940): synonym of Pseudogemmula pseudogranosa (Nomura, 1940)
- Gemmula pseudomonilifera Powell, 1967: synonym of Powelligemmula pseudomonilifera (A. W. B. Powell, 1967)
- Gemmula rarimaculata Kuroda, Habe & Oyama, 1971: synonym of Powelligemmula rarimaculata (Kuroda & Oyama, 1971)
- Gemmula rosario Shikama, 1977: synonym of Oliveragemmula rosario (Shikama & Hayashi, 1977)
- Gemmula rotatilis (Martens, 1902): synonym of Cryptogemma praesignis (E. A. Smith, 1895)
- Gemmula sogodensis Olivera, 2004: synonym of Oliveragemmula sogodensis (B. M. Olivera, 2005)
- Gemmula speciosa (Reeve, 1842): synonym of Oliveragemmula speciosa (Reeve, 1842)
- Gemmula subfenestrata Kosuge, 1990: synonym of Oliveragemmula subfenestrata (Kosuge, 1990)
- Gemmula teschi (Powell, 1964): synonym of Cryptogemma timorensis (Tesch, 1915)
- Gemmula tessellata Powell, 1967: synonym of Cryptogemma tessellata (Powell, 1967)
- Gemmula thielei Finlay H. J., 1930: synonym of Cryptogemma aethiopica (Thiele, 1925)
- Gemmula truncata (Schepman, 1913): synonym of Cryptogemma phymatias (R. B. Watson, 1886)
- Gemmula unedo (Kiener, 1840): synonym of Unedogemmula unedo (Kiener, 1839)
- Gemmula unilineata Powell, 1967: synonym of Cryptogemma unilineata (Powell, 1967)
- Gemmula vicella Dall, 1908 accepted as Gymnobela vicella (Dall, 1908) (original combination)
- Gemmula westaustralis Kosuge, 1990: synonym of Oliveragemmula westaustralis (Kosuge, 1990)
