= G. concinna =

G. concinna may refer to:

- Gagrella concinna, a joint-legged animal
- Gavia concinna, an extinct loon
- Gemmula concinna, a sea snail
- Gentianella concinna, a flowering plant
- Geonoma concinna, a New World palm
- Glossopsitta concinna, an Australian lorikeet
- Goodenia concinna, a flowering plant
- Goplana concinna, a rust fungus
- Grevillea concinna, a Western Australian shrub
- Griffinia concinna, a monocotyledonous plant
- Guignardia concinna, a sac fungus
- Gymnoscelis concinna, a geometer moth
