= Taylorigemmula =

Scientific classification
- Kingdom: Animalia
- Phylum: Mollusca
- Class: Gastropoda
- Subclass: Caenogastropoda
- Order: Neogastropoda
- Superfamily: Conoidea
- Family: Turridae
- Genus: Taylorigemmula; Kantor, Bouchet, Fedosov, Puillandre & Zaharias, 2024

Type species
- Taylorigemmula barbarae Kantor, Bouchet, Fedosov, Puillandre & Zaharias, 2024

Genus of gastropods

Taylorigemmula is a genus of sea snails, marine gastropod mollusks in the family Turridae, the turrids.

== Etymology ==
The genus is named after John D. Taylor, eminent British malacologist, for his contributions to the study of molluscs, including Conoidea, and also in reference to the overall similarity of the new genus to the earlier broader concept of Gemmula.

== Species ==
- Taylorigemmula barbarae Kantor, Bouchet, Fedosov, Puillandre & Zaharias, 2024
- Taylorigemmula fenestrata (Kosuge, 1990)
