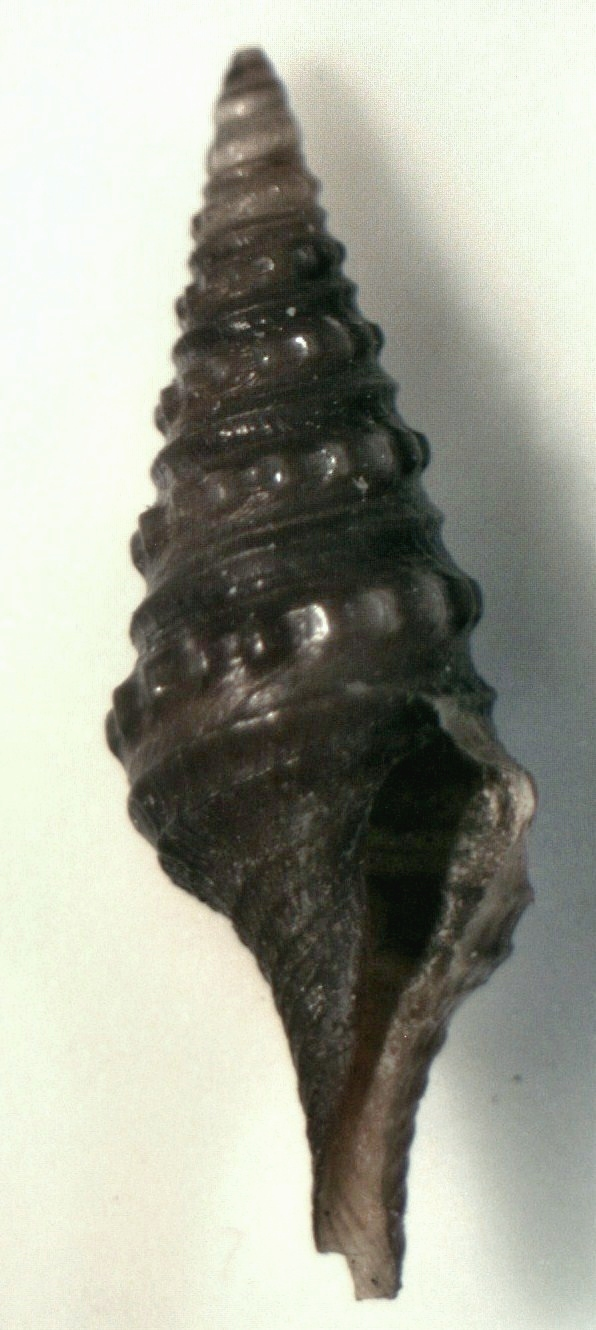
- Shell of Kilburnigemmula gemmulina

Scientific classification
- Kingdom: Animalia
- Phylum: Mollusca
- Class: Gastropoda
- Subclass: Caenogastropoda
- Order: Neogastropoda
- Superfamily: Conoidea
- Family: Turridae
- Genus: Kilburnigemmula; Kantor, Bouchet, Fedosov, Puillandre & Zaharias, 2024

Type species
- Kilburnigemmula papuensis Kantor, Bouchet, Fedosov, Puillandre & Zaharias, 2024

= Kilburnigemmula =

Genus of gastropods

Kilburnigemmula, common name the gem turrids, is a genus of sea snails, marine gastropod mollusks in the family Turridae, the turrids.

== Etymology ==
The genus is named after Richard Kilburn (1942–2013), eminent South African malacologist and the author of numerous publications on Conoidea, and refers to the earlier conchological concept of Gemmula.

== Species ==
- Kilburnigemmula gemmulina (E. von Martens, 1902)
- Kilburnigemmula papuensis Kantor, Bouchet, Fedosov, Puillandre & Zaharias, 2024
