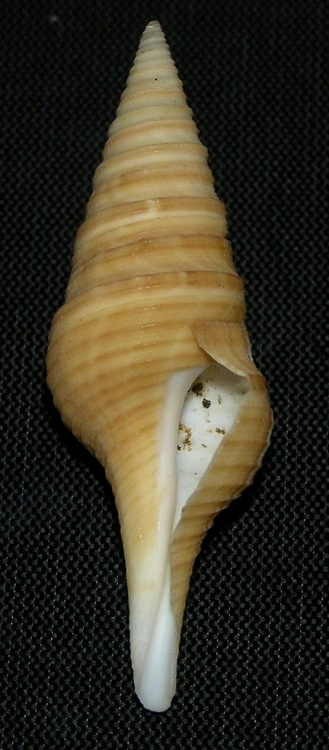
- Shell of Gemmula lululimi

Scientific classification
- Kingdom: Animalia
- Phylum: Mollusca
- Class: Gastropoda
- Subclass: Caenogastropoda
- Order: Neogastropoda
- Superfamily: Conoidea
- Family: Turridae
- Genus: Gemmula
- Species: G. lululimi

Binomial name
- Gemmula lululimi Olivera, 1999

Synonyms
- Turris munizi Vera-Pelaez, Vega-Luz & Lozano-Francisco, 2000 (declared junior synonym of Gemmula lululimi by First Reviser's choice by Kilburn et al. (2012))

= Gemmula lululimi =

Species of gastropod

Gemmula lululimi is a species of sea snail, a marine gastropod mollusk in the family Turridae, the turrids.

== Description ==
The length of the shell varies between 75 mm and 90.5 mm. The shell is characterised by its white body with continuous brown ridges, with a rather short siphonal canal and a strongly crenulated sinus cord.

== Distribution ==
This marine species occurs off the Philippines; also off Papua New Guinea and southwest Japan.
