= Gemmula waihaoensis =

Scientific classification
- Kingdom: Animalia
- Phylum: Mollusca
- Class: Gastropoda
- Subclass: Caenogastropoda
- Order: Neogastropoda
- Superfamily: Conoidea
- Family: Turridae
- Genus: Gemmula
- Species: G. waihaoensis

Binomial name
- Gemmula waihaoensis Finlay, 1924

Synonyms
- † Turris regius Suter, 1917

Extinct species of gastropod

Gemmula waihaoensis is an extinct species of sea snail, a marine gastropod mollusk in the family Turridae, the turrids.

== Distribution ==
Fossils of this marine species have been found in Tertiary strata in New Zealand.
