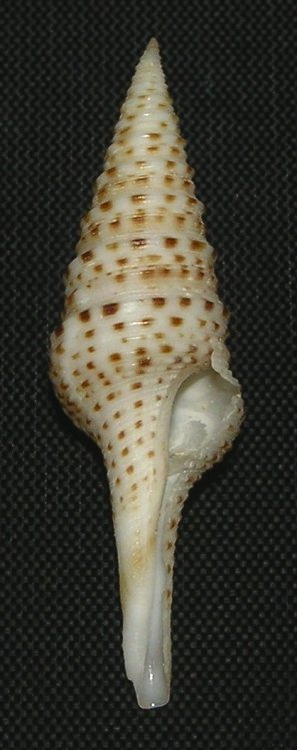
- Shell of Gemmula webberae

Scientific classification
- Kingdom: Animalia
- Phylum: Mollusca
- Class: Gastropoda
- Subclass: Caenogastropoda
- Order: Neogastropoda
- Superfamily: Conoidea
- Family: Turridae
- Genus: Gemmula
- Species: G. webberae

Binomial name
- Gemmula webberae Kilburn, 1975

Synonyms
- Gemmula (Gemmula) webberae Kilburn, 1975; Gemmula congener webberae Kilburn, 1975 (original combination)

= Gemmula webberae =

Species of gastropod

Gemmula webberae is a species of sea snail, a marine gastropod mollusk in the family Turridae, the turrids.

== Description ==
The length of the shell attains 55 mm.

== Distribution ==
This marine species occurs off South Africa; off Madagascar, and Zanzibar.
