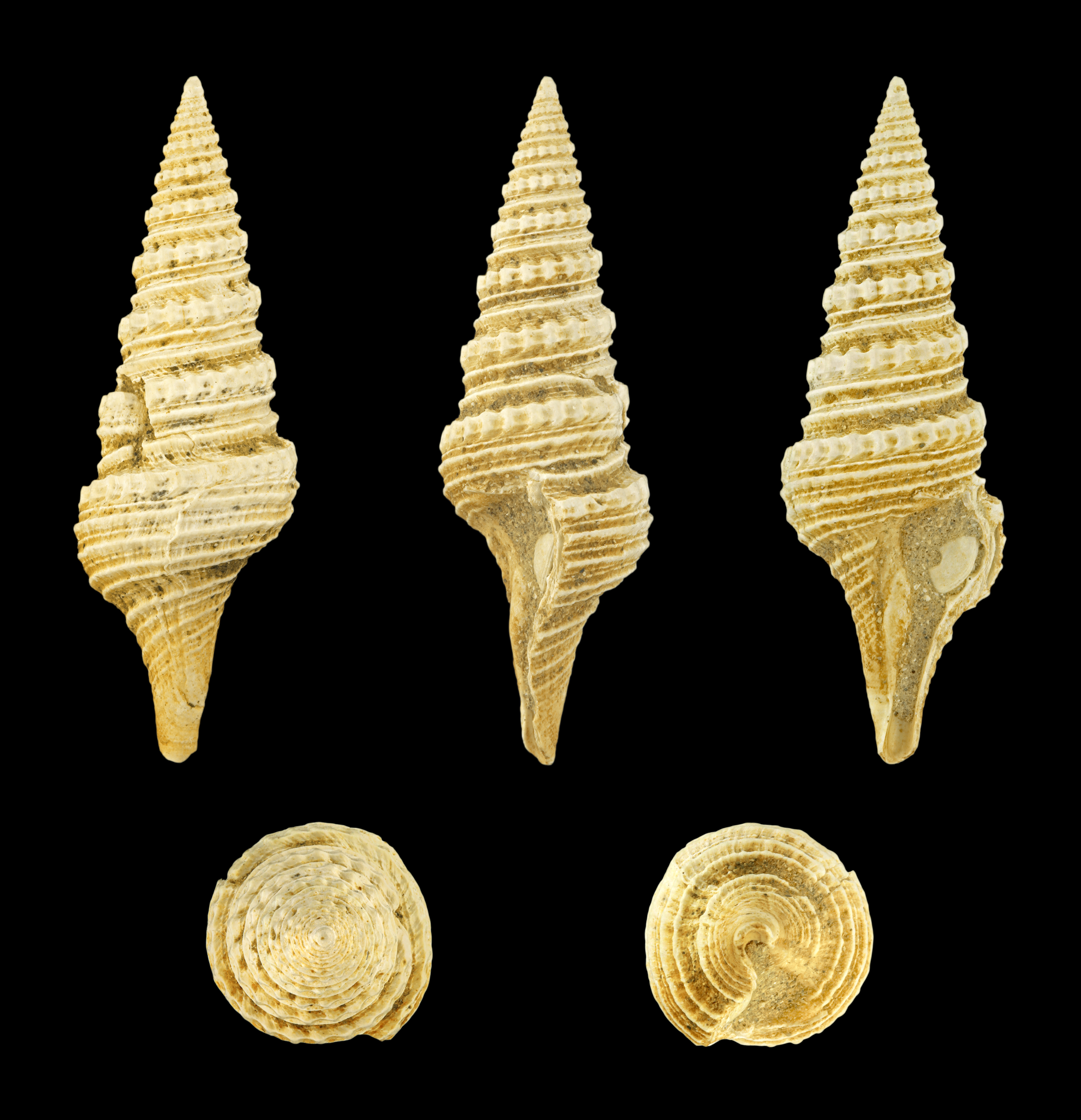
- Shell of Gemmula denticula

Scientific classification
- Kingdom: Animalia
- Phylum: Mollusca
- Class: Gastropoda
- Subclass: Caenogastropoda
- Order: Neogastropoda
- Superfamily: Conoidea
- Family: Turridae
- Genus: Gemmula
- Species: G. denticula

Binomial name
- Gemmula denticula (Basterot, 1825)

Synonyms
- † Turris denticula (Basterot, 1825)

= Gemmula denticula =

Extinct species of gastropod

Gemmula denticula is an extinct species of sea snail, a marine gastropod mollusk in the family Turridae, the turrids.

== Distribution ==
Fossils of this species were found in Miocene strata in Aquitaine, France and in Hungary.
