= Gemmula bimarginata =

Scientific classification
- Kingdom: Animalia
- Phylum: Mollusca
- Class: Gastropoda
- Subclass: Caenogastropoda
- Order: Neogastropoda
- Superfamily: Conoidea
- Family: Turridae
- Genus: Gemmula
- Species: G. bimarginata

Binomial name
- Gemmula bimarginata (Suter, 1917)

Synonyms
- † Turris bimarginatus Suter, 1917 (original combination)

Extinct species of gastropod

Gemmula bimarginata is an extinct species of sea snail, a marine gastropod mollusk in the family Turridae, the turrids.

== Distribution ==
Fossils of this marine species have been found in New Zealand.
