= Gemmula stupa =

Scientific classification
- Kingdom: Animalia
- Phylum: Mollusca
- Class: Gastropoda
- Subclass: Caenogastropoda
- Order: Neogastropoda
- Superfamily: Conoidea
- Family: Turridae
- Genus: Gemmula
- Species: G. stupa

Binomial name
- Gemmula stupa Lee, 2001

Species of gastropod

Gemmula stupa is a species of sea snail, a marine gastropod mollusk in the family Turridae, the turrids.

== Description ==
The length of the shell attains 35 mm.

== Distribution ==
This marine species occurs off Taiwan.
