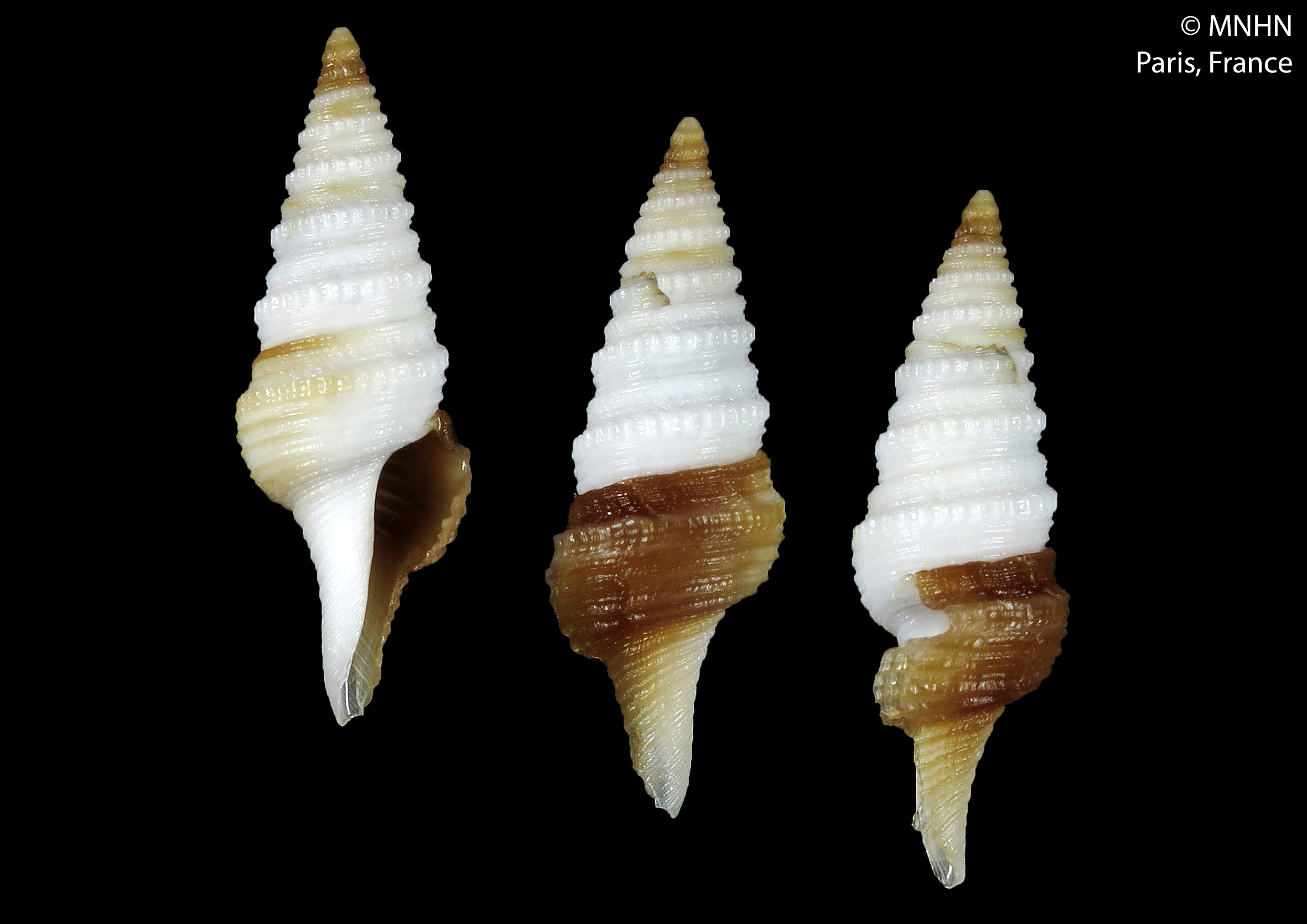
- Shell of Gemmula contrasta (holotype at MNHN, Paris)

Scientific classification
- Kingdom: Animalia
- Phylum: Mollusca
- Class: Gastropoda
- Subclass: Caenogastropoda
- Order: Neogastropoda
- Superfamily: Conoidea
- Family: Turridae
- Genus: Gemmula
- Species: G. contrasta

Binomial name
- Gemmula contrasta Stahlschmidt, Poppe & Tagaro, 2018

= Gemmula contrasta =

Species of gastropod

Gemmula contrasta is a species of sea snail, a marine gastropod mollusk in the family Turridae.

== Description ==
The length of the shell attains 17.8 mm.

== Distribution ==
This marine species occurs off Mactan Island, the Philippines.

== Original description ==
- Stahlschmidt P., Poppe G.T. & Tagaro S.P. (2018). Descriptions of remarkable new turrid species from the Philippines. Visaya. 5(1): 5-64. page(s): 33, pl. 25 figs 4–5.
