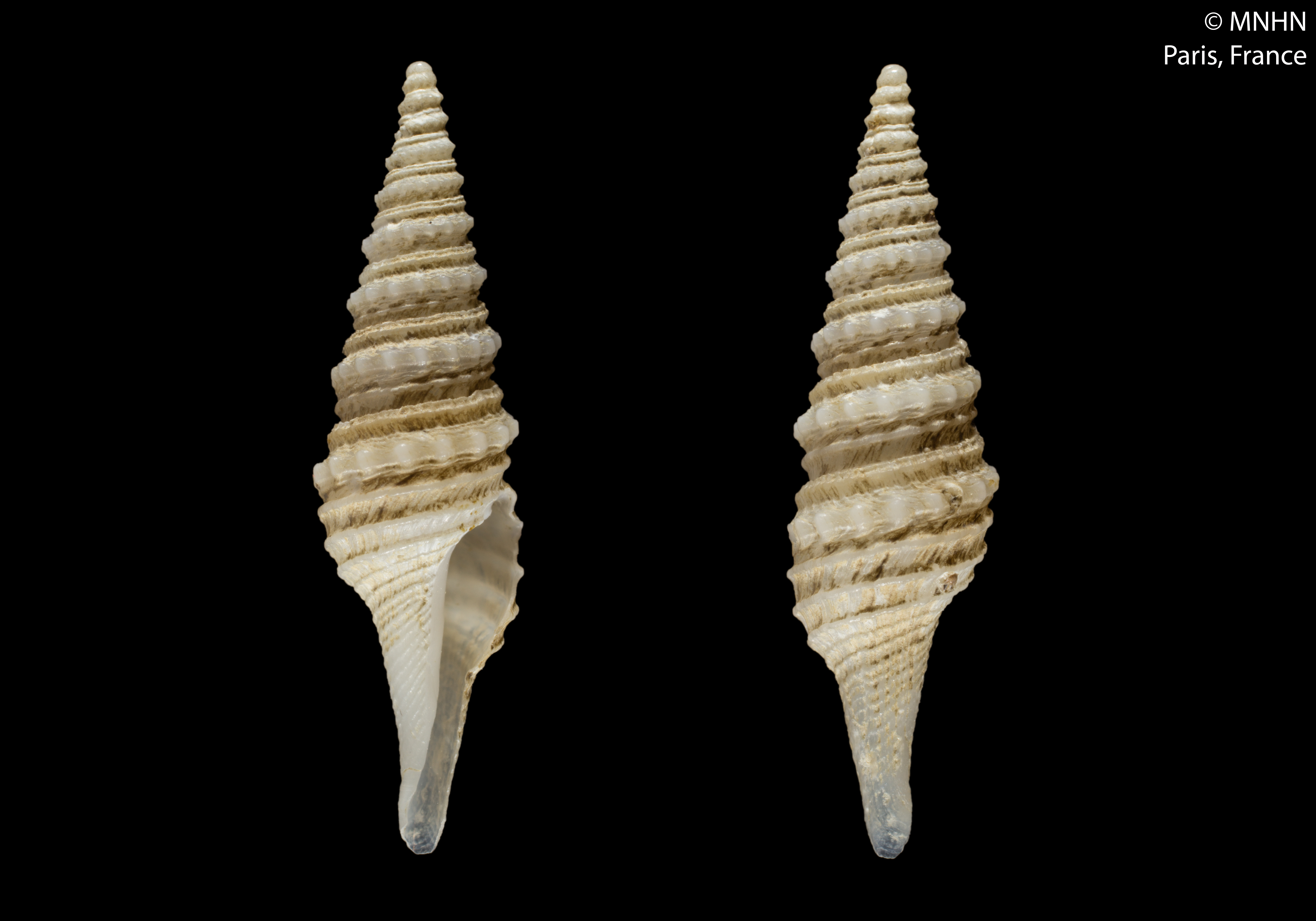
- Gemmula closterion Shells

Scientific classification
- Kingdom: Animalia
- Phylum: Mollusca
- Class: Gastropoda
- Subclass: Caenogastropoda
- Order: Neogastropoda
- Superfamily: Conoidea
- Family: Turridae
- Genus: Gemmula
- Species: G. closterion

Binomial name
- Gemmula closterion Sysoev, 1997

= Gemmula closterion =

Species of gastropod

Gemmula closterion is a species of sea snail, a marine gastropod mollusk in the family Turridae, the turrids.

== Description ==
The length of the shell attains 17.8 mm.

== Distribution ==
This marine species occurs off Tanimbar Island, Indonesia.
