= Taylorigemmula barbarae =

Scientific classification
- Kingdom: Animalia
- Phylum: Mollusca
- Class: Gastropoda
- Subclass: Caenogastropoda
- Order: Neogastropoda
- Superfamily: Conoidea
- Family: Turridae
- Genus: Taylorigemmula
- Species: T. barbarae

Binomial name
- Taylorigemmula barbarae Kantor, Bouchet, Fedosov, Puillandre & Zaharias, 2024

Species of gastropod

Taylorigemmula barbarae is a species of sea snail, a marine gastropod mollusk in the family Turridae, the turrids.

== Etymology ==
The species is named after Barbara Buge, collection manager at MNHN, for her many years of indispensable service in maintaining the molecular collection of molluscs.

== Distribution ==
This species occurs in the Philippine Sea .
