= Gemmula flata =

Scientific classification
- Kingdom: Animalia
- Phylum: Mollusca
- Class: Gastropoda
- Subclass: Caenogastropoda
- Order: Neogastropoda
- Superfamily: Conoidea
- Family: Turridae
- Genus: Gemmula
- Species: G. flata

Binomial name
- Gemmula flata Baoquan Li & Xinzheng Li, 2008

Species of gastropod

Gemmula flata is a species of sea snail, a marine gastropod mollusc in the family Turridae, the turrids.

== Description ==
The length of the shell attains 31.5 mm.

== Distribution ==
This species occurs in the Indo-Pacific areas including; Japan, Philippines, the Nansha Islands, the East China Sea, and the South China Sea. Flata is found in deep, tropical waters. Records indicate it inhabits depths with muddy sand substrates.
