= Gemmula garviei =

Scientific classification
- Kingdom: Animalia
- Phylum: Mollusca
- Class: Gastropoda
- Subclass: Caenogastropoda
- Order: Neogastropoda
- Superfamily: Conoidea
- Family: Turridae
- Genus: Gemmula
- Species: G. garviei

Binomial name
- Gemmula garviei Tracey & Craig, 2019

Extinct species of gastropod

Gemmula garviei is an extinct species of sea snail, a marine gastropod mollusk in the family Turridae, the turrids.

== Distribution ==
Fossils of this marine species have been found in Eocene strata in Cotentin, France.
