= Gemmula birmanica =

Scientific classification
- Kingdom: Animalia
- Phylum: Mollusca
- Class: Gastropoda
- Subclass: Caenogastropoda
- Order: Neogastropoda
- Superfamily: Conoidea
- Family: Turridae
- Genus: Gemmula
- Species: G. birmanica

Binomial name
- Gemmula birmanica (Vredenburg, 1921)

Synonyms
- † Pleurotoma (Gemmula) birmanica Vredenburg 1921; † Turris (Gemmula) birmanica (Vredenburg 1921)

Extinct species of gastropod

Gemmula birmanica is an extinct species of sea snail, a marine gastropod mollusk in the family Turridae, the turrids.

== Distribution ==
Fossils of this marine species have been found in Miocene strata of India and Myanmar; in Quaternary strtata of Indonesia; age range: 23.03 to 0.781 Ma
