= Gemmula husamaru =

Scientific classification
- Kingdom: Animalia
- Phylum: Mollusca
- Class: Gastropoda
- Subclass: Caenogastropoda
- Order: Neogastropoda
- Superfamily: Conoidea
- Family: Turridae
- Genus: Gemmula
- Species: G. husamaru

Binomial name
- Gemmula husamaru (Nomura, 1940)

Synonyms
- Turris husamaru Nomura, 1940

Species of gastropod

Gemmula husamaru is a species of sea snail, a marine gastropod mollusk in the family Turridae, the turrids.

== Description ==
The length of the shell attains 32 mm.

== Distribution ==
This marine species occurs off Japan and off Taiwan.
