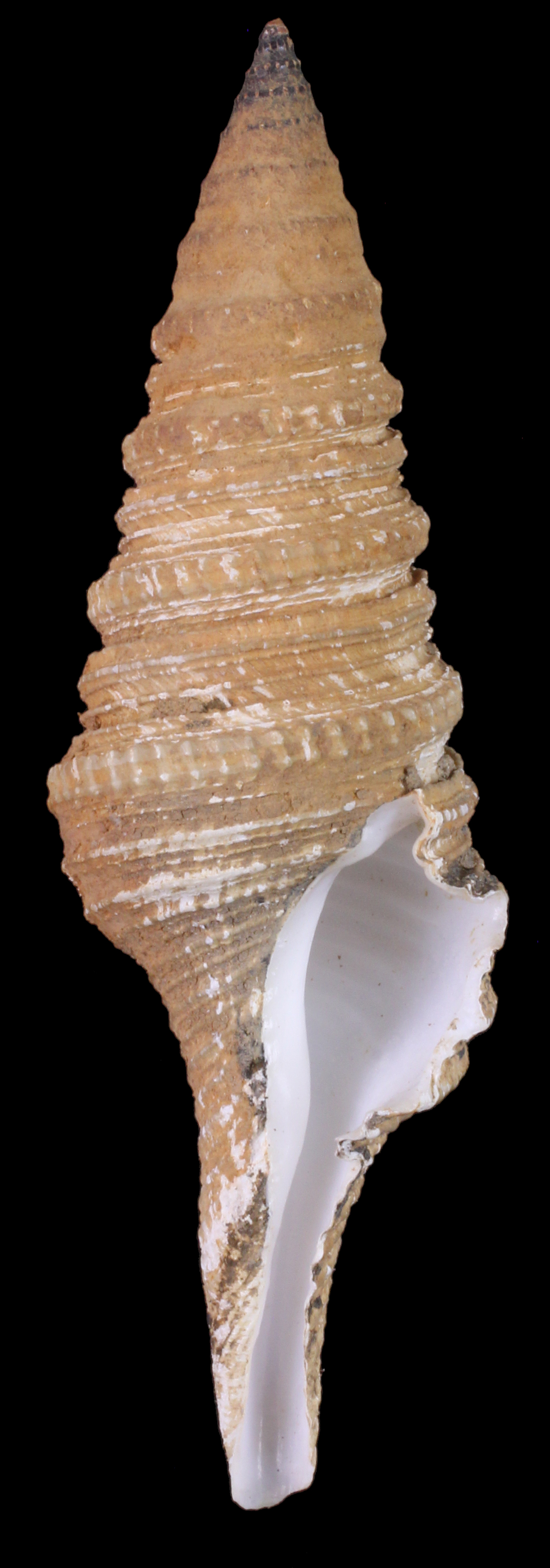
- Shell of Gemmula martini (specimen at MNHN, Paris)

Scientific classification
- Kingdom: Animalia
- Phylum: Mollusca
- Class: Gastropoda
- Subclass: Caenogastropoda
- Order: Neogastropoda
- Superfamily: Conoidea
- Family: Turridae
- Genus: Gemmula
- Species: G. martini

Binomial name
- Gemmula martini (Tesch, 1915)

Synonyms
- Gemmula (Gemmula) martini (Tesch, 1915); † Pleurotoma martini Tesch, 1915 (original combination); Pleurotoma (Gemmula) valdiviae Thiele, J. 1925

= Gemmula martini =

Species of gastropod

Gemmula martini is a species of sea snail, a marine gastropod mollusk in the family Turridae, the turrids.

== Description ==
The length of the shell varies between 46 mm and 77 mm.

== Distribution ==
This bathyal marine species occurs in the Indo-west Pacific, from East Africa to Borneo and Timor; also off Western Australia.

Fossils were found in Pliocene strata on Timor.
