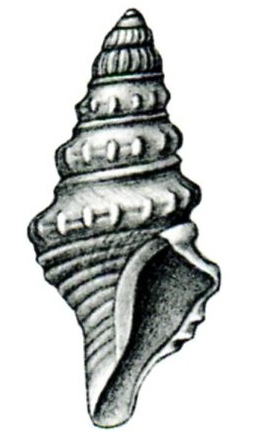
- Original image of a shell of Gemmula ducalis

Scientific classification
- Kingdom: Animalia
- Phylum: Mollusca
- Class: Gastropoda
- Subclass: Caenogastropoda
- Order: Neogastropoda
- Superfamily: Conoidea
- Family: Turridae
- Genus: Gemmula
- Species: G. ducalis

Binomial name
- Gemmula ducalis (Thiele, 1925)

Synonyms
- Pleurotoma (Gemmula) ducalis Thiele, 1925 (basionym); Pleurotoma ducalis Thiele, 1925

= Gemmula ducalis =

Species of gastropod

Gemmula ducalis is a species of sea snail, a marine gastropod mollusk in the family Turridae, the turrids.

== Distribution ==
This marine species occurs in the Indian Ocean off Somalia
