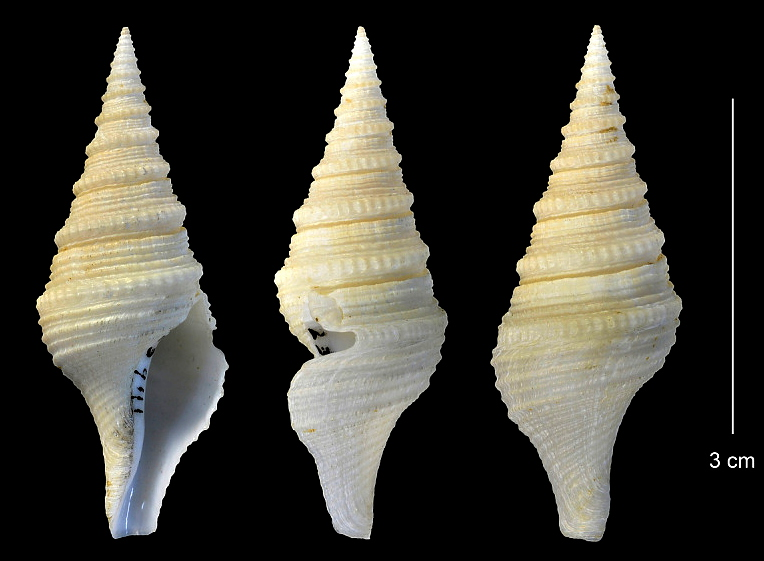
- Shell of Gemmula sibukoensis (holotype at the Smithsonian Institution)

Scientific classification
- Kingdom: Animalia
- Phylum: Mollusca
- Class: Gastropoda
- Subclass: Caenogastropoda
- Order: Neogastropoda
- Superfamily: Conoidea
- Family: Turridae
- Genus: Gemmula
- Species: G. sibukoensis

Binomial name
- Gemmula sibukoensis Powell, 1964

Synonyms
- Gemmula (Gemmula) sibukoensis Powell, 1964

= Gemmula sibukoensis =

Species of gastropod

Gemmula sibukoensis is a species of sea snail, a marine gastropod mollusk in the family Turridae, the turrids.

== Description ==
The length of the shell attains 47 mm.

== Distribution ==
This marine species occurs off the Philippines and Sabah at a depth of 475 m.
