= Gemmula kaiparaensis =

Scientific classification
- Kingdom: Animalia
- Phylum: Mollusca
- Class: Gastropoda
- Subclass: Caenogastropoda
- Order: Neogastropoda
- Superfamily: Conoidea
- Family: Turridae
- Genus: Gemmula
- Species: G. kaiparaensis

Binomial name
- Gemmula kaiparaensis (P. Marshall, 1918)

Synonyms
- † Turris kaiparaensis P. Marshall, 1918

Extinct species of gastropod

Gemmula kaiparaensis is an extinct species of sea snail, a marine gastropod mollusk in the family Turridae, the turrids.

== Distribution ==
Fossils of this marine species have been found in New Zealand.
