= Gemmula bearrizensis =

Scientific classification
- Kingdom: Animalia
- Phylum: Mollusca
- Class: Gastropoda
- Subclass: Caenogastropoda
- Order: Neogastropoda
- Superfamily: Conoidea
- Family: Turridae
- Genus: Gemmula
- Species: G. bearrizensis

Binomial name
- Gemmula bearrizensis Pacaud, 2021

Synonyms
- Drillia pellati Boussac, 1911 † (invalid: junior homonym of Drillia pellati Cossmann & Pissarro, 1904; Gemmula bearrizensis is a replacement name)

Extinct species of gastropod

Gemmula bearrizensis is an extinct species of sea snail, a marine gastropod mollusk in the family Turridae, the turrids.

== Distribution ==
Fossils of this marine species have been found in Paleogene strata near Biarritz, France.
