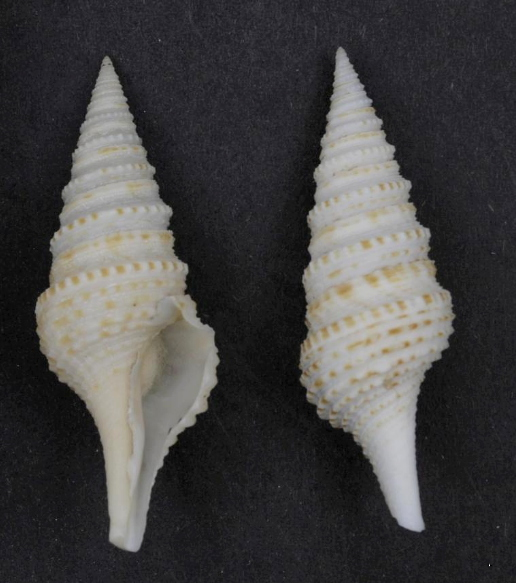
- Shell of Gemmula granosus (specimen at Naturalis Biodiversity Center)

Scientific classification
- Kingdom: Animalia
- Phylum: Mollusca
- Class: Gastropoda
- Subclass: Caenogastropoda
- Order: Neogastropoda
- Superfamily: Conoidea
- Family: Turridae
- Genus: Gemmula
- Species: G. granosus

Binomial name
- Gemmula granosus (Helbling, 1779)

Synonyms
- Gemmula (Gemmula) granosa (Helbling, 1779); Murex granosus Helbling, 1779; Pleurotoma (Turris) granosa (Helbling, 1779)

= Gemmula granosus =

Species of gastropod

Gemmula granosus is a species of sea snail, a marine gastropod mollusk in the family Turridae, the turrids.

== Description ==
The length of the shell attains 27 mm.

== Distribution ==
This marine species occurs in the Western Pacific.
