= Gemmula lordhoweensis =

Scientific classification
- Kingdom: Animalia
- Phylum: Mollusca
- Class: Gastropoda
- Subclass: Caenogastropoda
- Order: Neogastropoda
- Superfamily: Conoidea
- Family: Turridae
- Genus: Gemmula
- Species: G. lordhoweensis

Binomial name
- Gemmula lordhoweensis Kantor & Sysoev, 1991

Synonyms
- Gemmula (Ptychosyrinx) lordhoweensis Kantor & Sysoev, 1991; Ptychosyrinx lordhoweensis (Kantor & Sysoev, 1991)

Species of gastropod

Gemmula lordhoweensis is a species of sea snail, a marine gastropod mollusk in the family Turridae, the turrids.

== Description ==
The length of the shell attains 21.5 mm, its diameter is 7.5 mm.

== Distribution ==
This bathyal species was found on the Lord Howe Rise.
