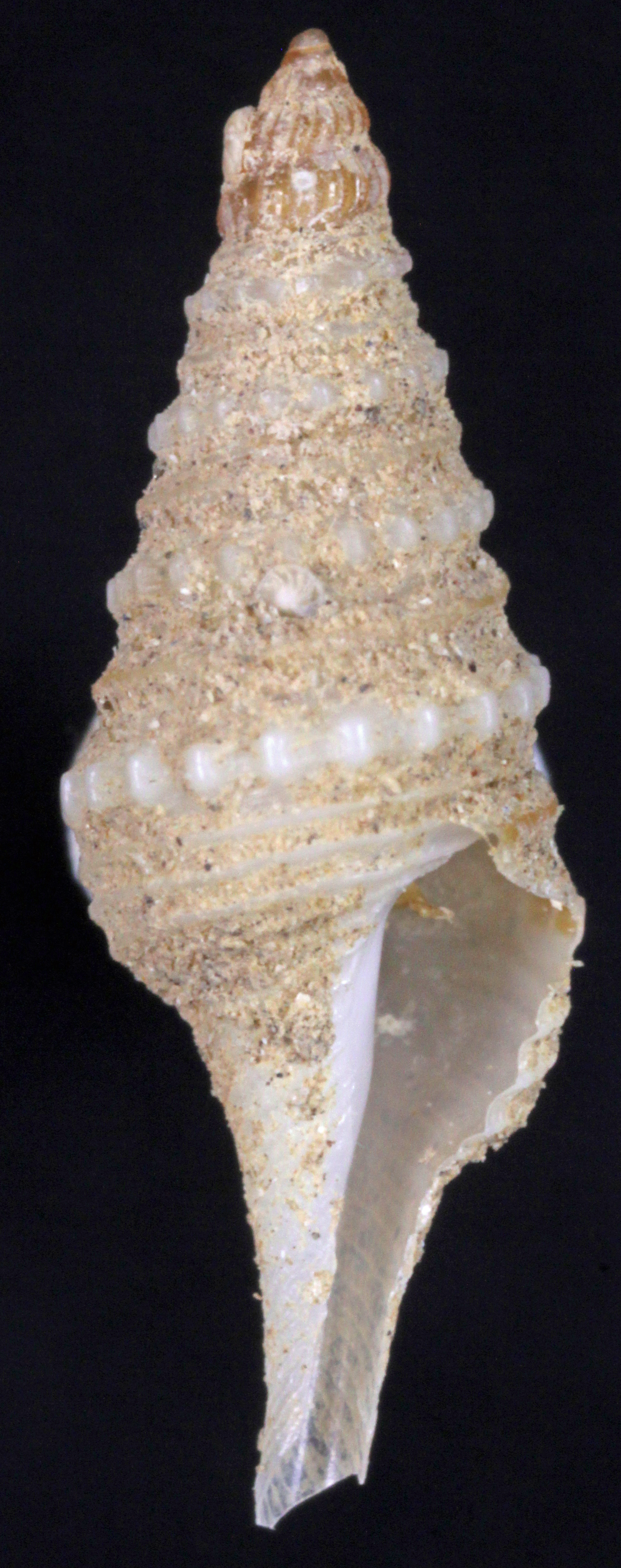
- Shell of Powelligemmula rarimaculata (specimen at MNHN, Paris)

Scientific classification
- Kingdom: Animalia
- Phylum: Mollusca
- Class: Gastropoda
- Subclass: Caenogastropoda
- Order: Neogastropoda
- Superfamily: Conoidea
- Family: Turridae
- Genus: Powelligemmula; Kantor, Bouchet, Fedosov, Puillandre & Zaharias, 2024

Type species
- Gemmula rarimaculata Kuroda & Oyama, 1971

= Powelligemmula =

Genus of gastropods

Powelligemmula is a genus of sea snails, marine gastropod mollusks in the family Turridae, the turrids.

== Species ==
- Powelligemmula pseudomonilifera (A. W. B. Powell, 1967)
- Powelligemmula rarimaculata (Kuroda & Oyama, 1971)
