= Gemmula hindsiana =

Scientific classification
- Kingdom: Animalia
- Phylum: Mollusca
- Class: Gastropoda
- Subclass: Caenogastropoda
- Order: Neogastropoda
- Superfamily: Conoidea
- Family: Turridae
- Genus: Gemmula
- Species: G. hindsiana

Binomial name
- Gemmula hindsiana Berry, 1958

Synonyms
- Gemmula gemmata (Hinds, 1843); Pleurotoma gemmata Hinds, 1843 (invalid: junior homonym of Pleurotoma gemmata Conrad, 1835 [fossil]; Gemmula hindsiana is a replacement name)

Species of gastropod

Gemmula hindsiana is a species of sea snail, a marine gastropod mollusk in the family Turridae, the turrids.

== Description ==
The shell length is up to 18 mm.

== Distribution ==
This marine species occurs from the Southwest Baja California, Mexico to Peru.
