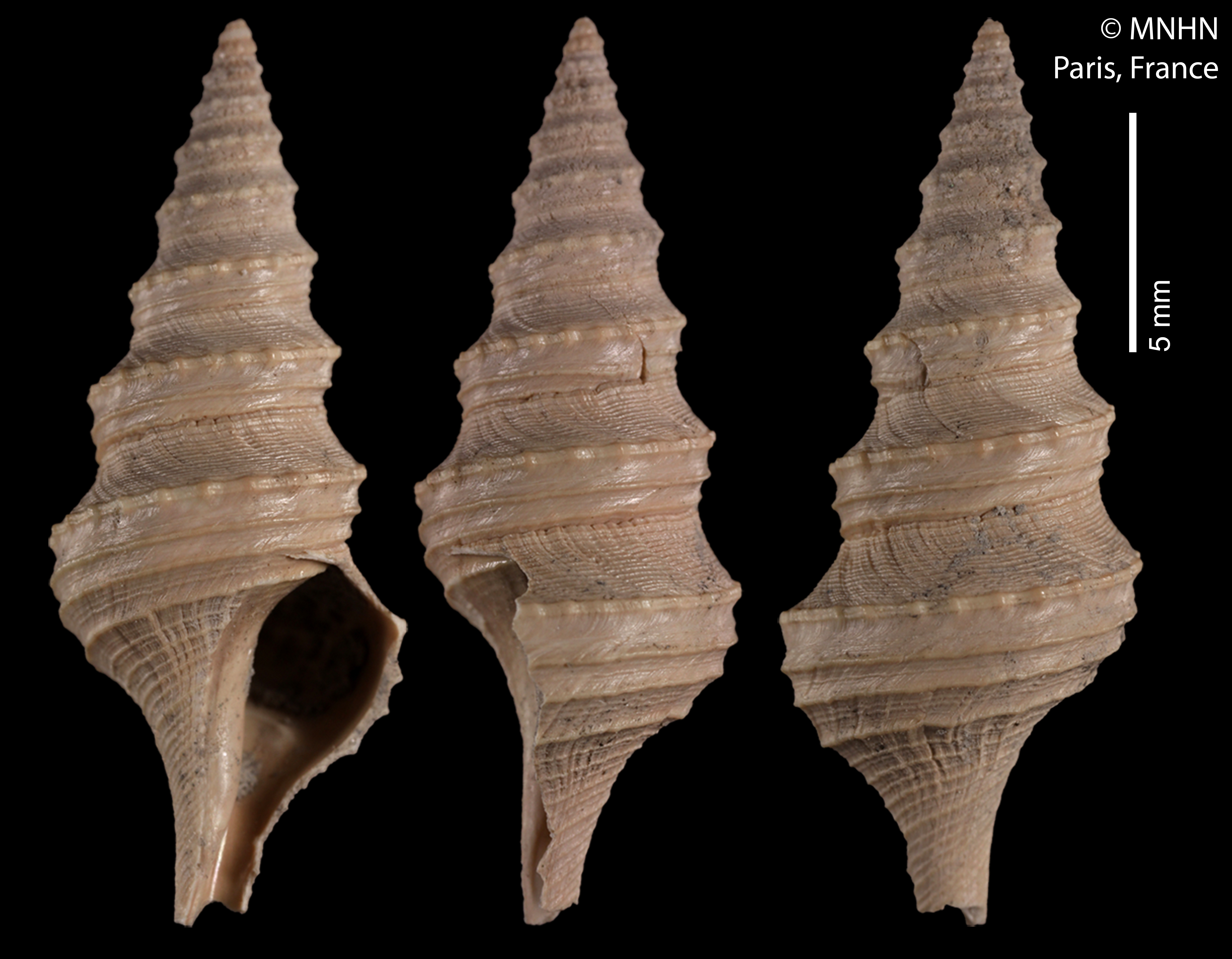
- Shell of Gemmula peyrerensis (holotype at MNHN, Paris)

Scientific classification
- Kingdom: Animalia
- Phylum: Mollusca
- Class: Gastropoda
- Subclass: Caenogastropoda
- Order: Neogastropoda
- Superfamily: Conoidea
- Family: Turridae
- Genus: Gemmula
- Species: G. peyrerensis

Binomial name
- Gemmula peyrerensis (Peyrot, 1931)

Synonyms
- † Pleurotoma rotata var. peyrerensis Peyrot, 1931 (basionym)

= Gemmula peyrerensis =

Extinct species of gastropod

Gemmula peyrerensis is an extinct species of sea snail, a marine gastropod mollusk in the family Turridae, the turrids.

== Distribution ==
Fossils of this marine species have been found in Oligocene strata in Aquitaine, France.
