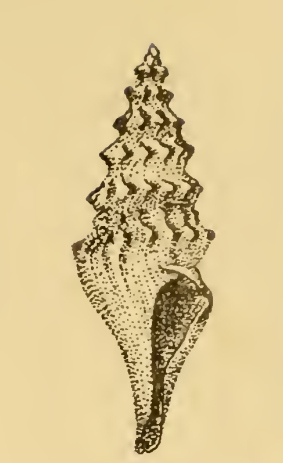
- Shell of Gemmula samueli (holotype)

Scientific classification
- Kingdom: Animalia
- Phylum: Mollusca
- Class: Gastropoda
- Subclass: Caenogastropoda
- Order: Neogastropoda
- Superfamily: Conoidea
- Family: Turridae
- Genus: Gemmula
- Species: G. samueli

Binomial name
- Gemmula samueli (Tenison Woods, 1879)

Synonyms
- Hemipleurotoma samueli Cossmann, 1896; Pleurotoma samueli Tenison-Woods, 1879 (original combination); Pleurotoma (Hemipleurotoma) samueli Tate and Dennant, 1898

= Gemmula samueli =

Extinct species of gastropod

Gemmula samueli is an extinct species of sea snail, a marine gastropod mollusk in the family Turridae, the turrids.

== Description ==
Dimensions: length 12 mm; breadth 4 mm; length of the aperture 7 mm.

The fusiform shell is elongate. The turbinate protoconch is composed of three smooth whorls, the suture of which is marginate. In the brephic stage the margination is much accentuated, and at a later period of growth gives way to a row of small, distant granules.

In the same manner, the median, tuberculated carina of the adult commences in the brephic stage by large obtuse undulations

The shell is thus described by Mr. Tenison-Woods: "It is a polished shell, with whorls angular in the middle, supporting a single, somewhat distant series of coarse, blunt, somewhat square tubercles. These are exactly on the line of the sinus, and at each side the lines of growth curve away from it. The sinus itself is deep, broad, and somewhat quadrate. The aperture is long and round, rather square posteriorly, and the canal is long and only slightly curved."

The marginate character of the protoconch is noteworthy; from its metamorphosis in later stages of growth, it would appear that the species has descended from a stock in which the suture was accompanied by a large flat keel, though no shell of that character has been recorded as occurring in the Australian Tertiaries.

Another point of interest in this species is its compound character: it possesses the tubercular sutural coronation and produced spire characteristic of Clavatula, and shows what value is to be placed on that feature. The special nature of the peripheral keel and the arcuate, long siphonal canal somewhat resemble Surcula. Whilst the position of the suture and other general features of the shell recall Pleurotoma. Clearly it was pregnant with evolutionary possibilities.

== Distribution ==
Fossils of this marine species have been found in Eocene strata in Victoria, Australia.
