= Kilburnigemmula papuensis =

Scientific classification
- Kingdom: Animalia
- Phylum: Mollusca
- Class: Gastropoda
- Subclass: Caenogastropoda
- Order: Neogastropoda
- Superfamily: Conoidea
- Family: Turridae
- Genus: Kilburnigemmula
- Species: K. papuensis

Binomial name
- Kilburnigemmula papuensis Kantor, Bouchet, Fedosov, Puillandre & Zaharias, 2024

Species of gastropod

Kilburnigemmula papuensis is a species of sea snail, a marine gastropod mollusk in the family Turridae, the turrids.

== Distribution ==
This marine species occurs in the Bismarck Sea.
