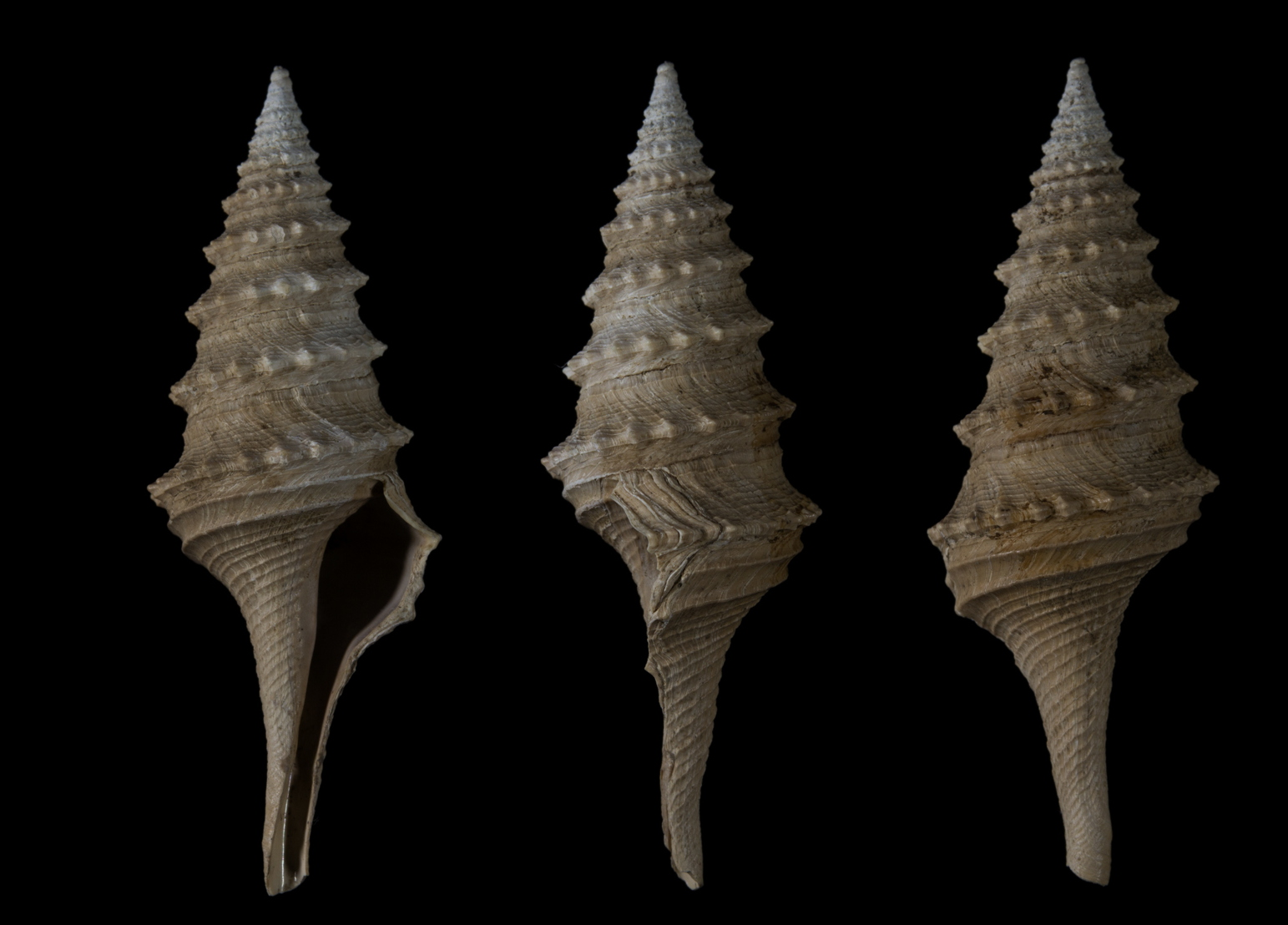
- Shell of Gemmula rotata (specimen at MNHN, Paris)

Scientific classification
- Kingdom: Animalia
- Phylum: Mollusca
- Class: Gastropoda
- Subclass: Caenogastropoda
- Order: Neogastropoda
- Superfamily: Conoidea
- Family: Turridae
- Genus: Gemmula
- Species: G. rotata

Binomial name
- Gemmula rotata (Brocchi, 1814)

Synonyms
- † Murex rotatus Brocchi, 1814 (original combination); † Pleurotoma rotata (Brocchi, 1814)

= Gemmula rotata =

Extinct species of gastropod

Gemmula rotata is an extinct species of sea snail, a marine gastropod mollusk in the family Turridae, the turrids.

== Distribution ==
Fossils of this marine species have been found in Pliocene strata in Provence-Alpes-Côte d'Azur, France.
