= Gemmula pseudostupa =

Scientific classification
- Kingdom: Animalia
- Phylum: Mollusca
- Class: Gastropoda
- Subclass: Caenogastropoda
- Order: Neogastropoda
- Superfamily: Conoidea
- Family: Turridae
- Genus: Gemmula
- Species: G. pseudostupa

Binomial name
- Gemmula pseudostupa Y.-P. Cheng & C.-Y. Lee, 2011

Synonyms
- Gemmula (Ptychosyrinx) pseudostupa Y.-P. Cheng & C.-Y. Lee, 2011 (basionym)

Species of gastropod

Gemmula pseudostupa is a species of sea snail, a marine gastropod mollusk in the family Turridae, the turrids.

== Distribution ==
This marine species occurs in the South China Sea.
