= Gemmula alwyni =

Scientific classification
- Kingdom: Animalia
- Phylum: Mollusca
- Class: Gastropoda
- Subclass: Caenogastropoda
- Order: Neogastropoda
- Superfamily: Conoidea
- Family: Turridae
- Genus: Gemmula
- Species: G. alwyni

Binomial name
- Gemmula alwyni Kilburn, 2005

Synonyms
- Gemmula kieneri (non Doumet, 1840): Cernohorsky, 1987; Gemmula unedo (non Kiener, 1840): Medinskaya, 2002

Species of gastropod

Gemmula alwyni is a species of sea snail, a marine gastropod mollusk in the family Turridae, the turrids.

== Description ==
The length of the shell attains 81.8 mm, its diameter is 29.7 mm.

== Distribution ==
This marine species occurs off KwaZulu-Natal, north to the Mozambique Channel, South Africa.
