= Gemmula peraspera =

Scientific classification
- Kingdom: Animalia
- Phylum: Mollusca
- Class: Gastropoda
- Subclass: Caenogastropoda
- Order: Neogastropoda
- Superfamily: Conoidea
- Family: Turridae
- Genus: Gemmula
- Species: G. peraspera

Binomial name
- Gemmula peraspera Marwick, 1931

Extinct species of gastropod

Gemmula peraspera is an extinct species of sea snail, a marine gastropod mollusk in the family Turridae, the turrids.

== Distribution ==
Fossils of this marine species have been found in Tertiary strata in New Zealand.
