= Gemmula grandigyrata =

Scientific classification
- Kingdom: Animalia
- Phylum: Mollusca
- Class: Gastropoda
- Subclass: Caenogastropoda
- Order: Neogastropoda
- Superfamily: Conoidea
- Family: Turridae
- Genus: Gemmula
- Species: G. grandigyrata

Binomial name
- Gemmula grandigyrata Baoquan Li & Xinzheng Li, 2008

Species of gastropod

Gemmula grandigyrata is a species of sea snail, a marine gastropod mollusc in the family Turridae, the turrids.

== Description ==
The length of the shell attains 8.2 mm.

== Distribution ==
This species was found in the South China Seas. The is distinguished from its close relatives (Gemmula) by having a larger and more spiral-lobed early shell (protoconch) with six whorls.
