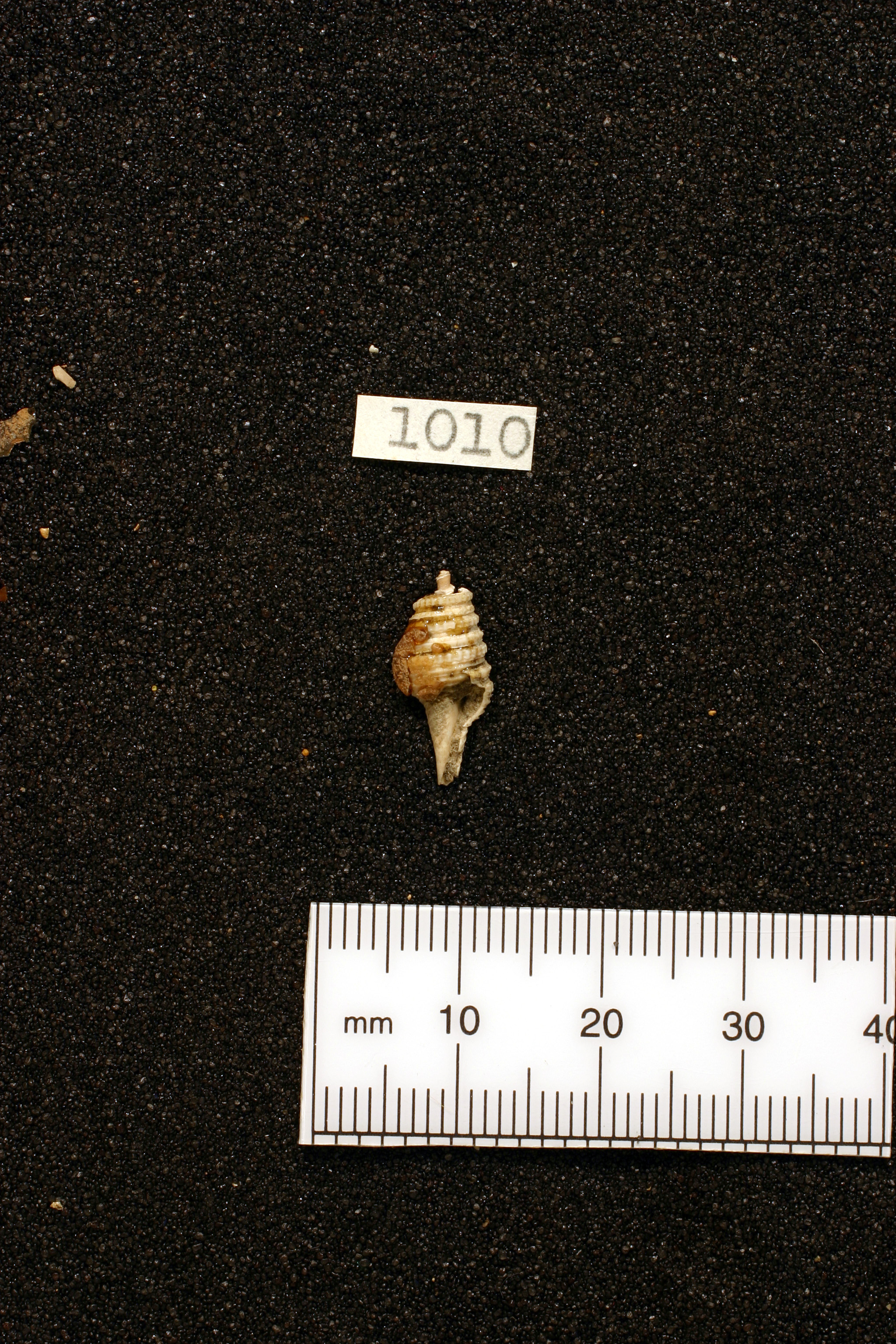

Scientific classification
- Kingdom: Animalia
- Phylum: Mollusca
- Class: Gastropoda
- Subclass: Caenogastropoda
- Order: Neogastropoda
- Superfamily: Conoidea
- Family: Turridae
- Genus: Gemmula
- Species: G. machapoorensis

Binomial name
- Gemmula machapoorensis Maury 1925

Synonyms
- † Drillia vaningeni machapoorensis Maury 1925; † Hemipleurotoma bitropis Gardner 1938; † Turris brassoensis Mansfield 1925

= Gemmula machapoorensis =

Extinct species of gastropod

Gemmula machapoorensis is an extinct species of sea snail, a marine gastropod mollusk in the family Turridae, the turrids.

== Description ==
The length of the shell attains 19 mm.

== Distribution ==
Fossils of this marine species have been found in Miocene strata of Panama, Trinidad and Tobago and Florida, USA.
