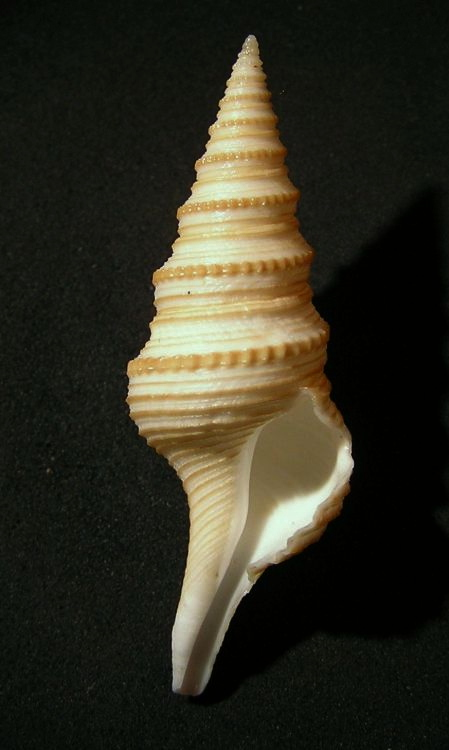
- Shell of Gemmula sikatunai

Scientific classification
- Kingdom: Animalia
- Phylum: Mollusca
- Class: Gastropoda
- Subclass: Caenogastropoda
- Order: Neogastropoda
- Superfamily: Conoidea
- Family: Turridae
- Genus: Gemmula
- Species: G. sikatunai

Binomial name
- Gemmula sikatunai Olivera, 2004

= Gemmula sikatunai =

Species of gastropod

Gemmula sikatunai is a species of sea snail, a marine gastropod mollusk in the family Turridae, the turrids.

== Description ==
The length of the shell varies between 40 mm and 80 mm.

== Distribution ==
This marine species occurs off the Philippines; also in the Caribbean Sea.
