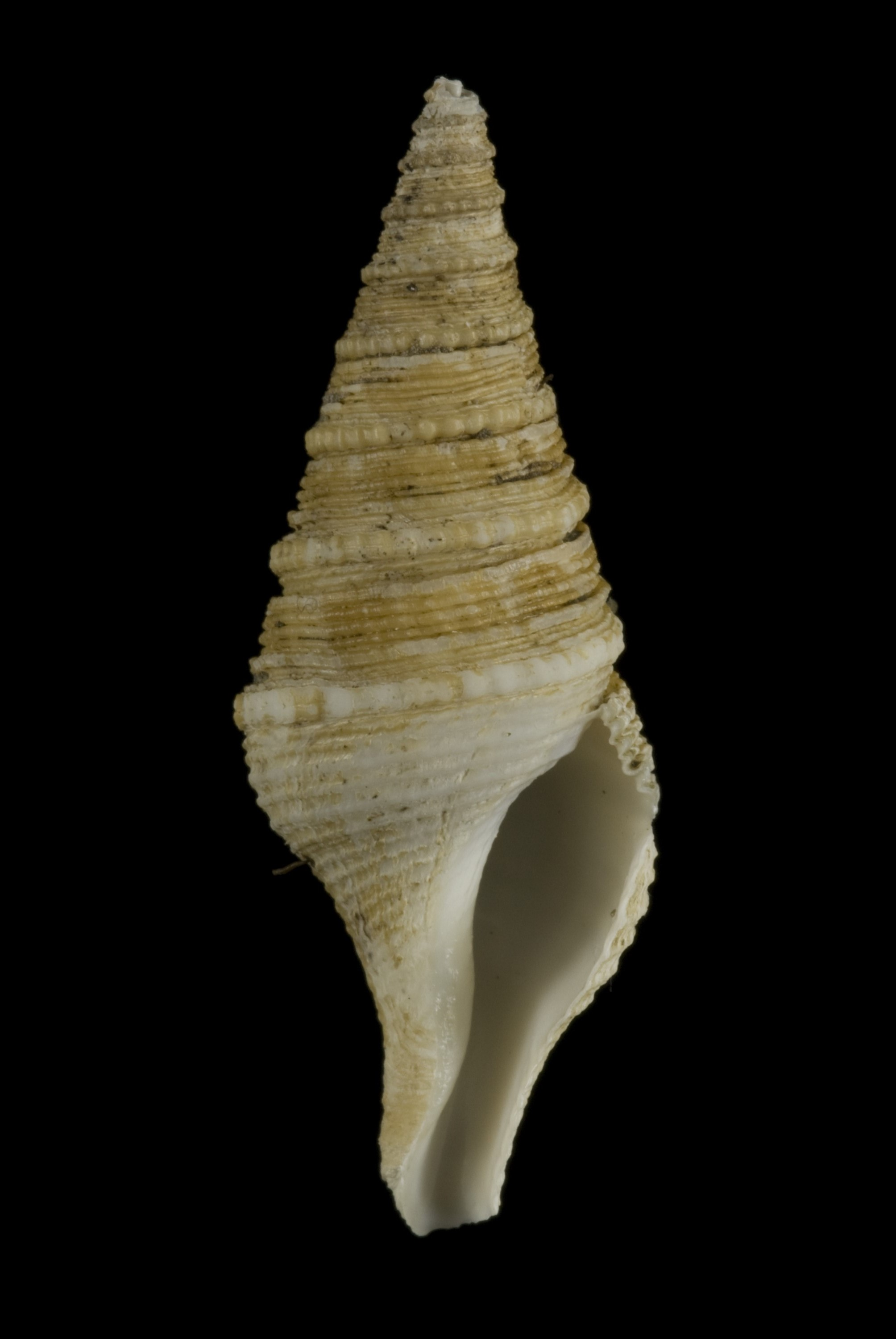
- Shell of Gemmula sibogae (specimen at MNHN, Paris)

Scientific classification
- Kingdom: Animalia
- Phylum: Mollusca
- Class: Gastropoda
- Subclass: Caenogastropoda
- Order: Neogastropoda
- Superfamily: Conoidea
- Family: Turridae
- Genus: Gemmula
- Species: G. sibogae

Binomial name
- Gemmula sibogae (Schepman, 1913)

Synonyms
- Pleurotoma sibogae Schepman, 1913

= Gemmula sibogae =

Species of gastropod

Gemmula sibogae is a species of sea snail, a marine gastropod mollusk in the family Turridae, the turrids.

== Description ==
The length of the shell varies between 28 mm and 75 mm.

The thin shell is broadly fusiform, with an acute, conical spire and strong, angular body whorl. It is whitish, faintly yellowish on the keel, between the nodules.

The shell contains 11 whorls, but the number may be considerably more, as the upper teleoconch whorl seems to be wanting and the shell has the appearance of being not adult. The holotype contains one upper teleoconch whorl (or 2). It is smooth, convex, and followed by nearly another whorl, with rather remote ribs. The subsequent whorls are concave above the keel, with a moderately strong infrasutural keel and 1 or 2 other spirals in the excavation between suture and keel. The infrasutural keel becomes fainter and is scarcely if at all traceable on lower whorls, where on the contrary the number of spirals increases, so that on body whorl of the specimen their number amounts to 6 and two very narrow ones just above the keel. This latter is rather narrow, composed of 3 narrow superficial spirals, more conspicuous between the nodules, perhaps rubbed off on the nodules themselves. Below the keel the body whorl is very convex, but soon contracted and passes into a slender, moderately long siphonal canal. The whole lower part of this whorl is lirate, irregularly on the body, where 2 lirae are stronger, more regularly on the siphonal canal. The total number of these lirae number about 35, but on the base of the tail too faint to be properly counted. Moreover a few narrow intermediate ones occur below periphery, and the whole shell exhibits very fine growth striae. The nodules on the keel are rounded, slightly compressed, not very numerous, 24 on the body whorl. The aperture is triangular with an angle above and at the keel. The interior of the aperture is white and smooth. The columellar side is enamelled. The thin peristome is broken.

== Distribution ==
This species occurs off Indonesia; in the Bismarck Sea and off Western Australia.
