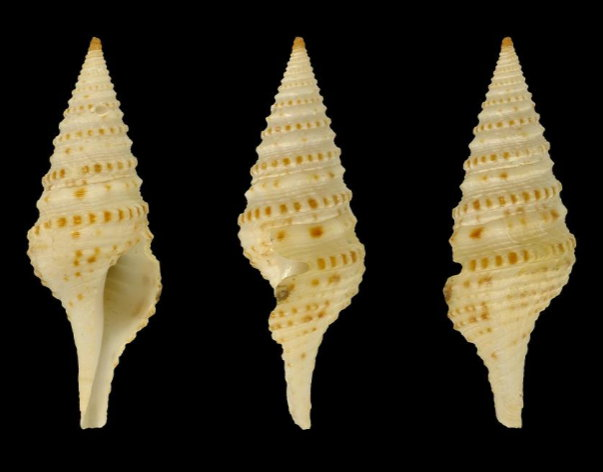
- Shell of Gemmula interpolata (holotype at the Smithsonian Institution)

Scientific classification
- Kingdom: Animalia
- Phylum: Mollusca
- Class: Gastropoda
- Subclass: Caenogastropoda
- Order: Neogastropoda
- Superfamily: Conoidea
- Family: Turridae
- Genus: Gemmula
- Species: G. interpolata

Binomial name
- Gemmula interpolata Powell, 1967

Synonyms
- Gemmula (Gemmula) interpolata Powell, 1967

= Gemmula interpolata =

Species of gastropod

Gemmula interpolata is a species of sea snail, a marine gastropod mollusk in the family Turridae, the turrids.

== Description ==
The length of the shell attains 23 mm.

== Distribution ==
This marine specimen was found off Laysan Island, northwest of, Hawaii, North Pacific Ocean.
