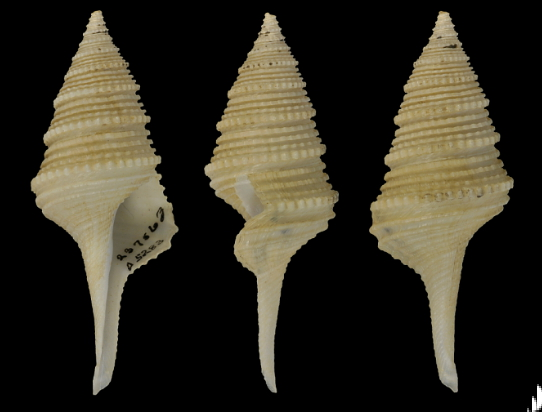
- Shell of Cryptogemma aethiopica (holotype at Smithsonian Institution)

Scientific classification
- Kingdom: Animalia
- Phylum: Mollusca
- Class: Gastropoda
- Subclass: Caenogastropoda
- Order: Neogastropoda
- Superfamily: Conoidea
- Family: Turridae
- Genus: Cryptogemma
- Species: C. aethiopica

Binomial name
- Cryptogemma aethiopica (Thiele, 1925)

Synonyms
- Gemmula (Pinguigemmula) thielei Finlay, 1930; Gemmula aethiopica (Thiele, 1925); Gemmula luzonica (Powell, 1964); Gemmula thielei Finlay, 1930; Pinguigemmula luzonica Powell, 1964; † Pinguigemmula okinavensis MacNeil, 1961; Pinguigemmula philippinensis Powell, 1964; Pinguigemmula thielei Powell 1964; Pleurotoma aethiopica Thiele, 1925; Pleurotoma fusiformis Thiele, 1925; Pleurotoma (Gemmula) aethiopica Thiele, 1925 (basionym); Pleurotoma (Gemmula) fusiformis Thiele, 1925 (invalid: junior homonym of Pleurotoma fusiformis J.de C. Sowerby, 1823; Gemmula thielei is a replacement name); † Pleurotoma tricincta K. Martin, 1935

= Cryptogemma aethiopica =

Species of gastropod

Cryptogemma aethiopica is a species of sea snail, a marine gastropod mollusk in the family Turridae, the turrids.

== Description ==
The length of the shell attains 42.2 mm, its diameter 16.9 mm.

== Distribution ==
This species occurs in the Indian Ocean off Somalia and Madagascar, in the Central Indo-Pacific at depths between 400 m to 850 m; as well as in the South China Sea, where it occurs off Sumatra and Indonesia.
