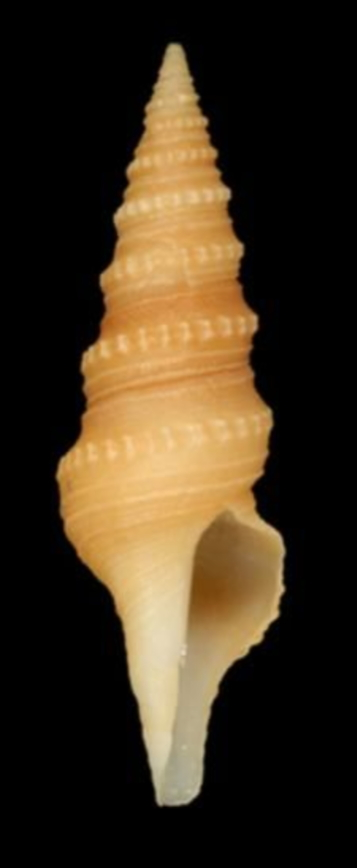
- Shell of Powelligemmula pseudomonilifera (holotype at the Auckland Museum)

Scientific classification
- Kingdom: Animalia
- Phylum: Mollusca
- Class: Gastropoda
- Subclass: Caenogastropoda
- Order: Neogastropoda
- Superfamily: Conoidea
- Family: Turridae
- Genus: Powelligemmula
- Species: P. pseudomonilifera

Binomial name
- Powelligemmula pseudomonilifera (A.W.B. Powell, 1967)

Synonyms
- Gemmula pseudomonilifera A. W. B. Powell, 1967 superseded combination; Gemmula (Gemmula) pseudomonilifera A.W.B. Powell, 1967

= Powelligemmula pseudomonilifera =

Species of gastropod

Powelligemmula pseudomonilifera is a species of sea snail, a marine gastropod mollusk in the family Turridae, the turrids.

== Description ==
The length of the shell attains 12.5 mm.

== Distribution ==
This marine species occurs off Hawaii.
