= Gemmula concinna =

Scientific classification
- Kingdom: Animalia
- Phylum: Mollusca
- Class: Gastropoda
- Subclass: Caenogastropoda
- Order: Neogastropoda
- Superfamily: Conoidea
- Family: Turridae
- Genus: Gemmula
- Species: G. concinna

Binomial name
- Gemmula concinna (Dunker, 1871)

Synonyms
- Clathurella concinna Dunker, 1871

Species of gastropod

Gemmula concinna is a species of sea snail, a marine gastropod mollusk in the family Turridae, the turrids.

== Description ==
The length of the shell varies between 30 mm and 45 mm.

(Original description by Dunker - translated from Latin) The small shell has an ovate-oblong shape. It is yellowish-white, girded with dark lines. The longitudinal ribs are almost erased. The transverse striae show a delicate lattice-like structure. The shell contains seven slightly convex whorls. The suture is distinct but not deep. The aperture is oval. The outer lip is incrassate and below varicose. Inside it is crenulate. The sinus is of an average size.

(Described by Tryon as Clathurella reeviana) The surface is almost microscopically decussated, the spiral sculpture being generally the strongest. The color of the shell is whitish, with light chestnut revolving lines, irregularly distributed, approximating or distant.

== Distribution ==
This marine species occurs off the Philippines.
