= Taylorigemmula fenestrata =

Scientific classification
- Kingdom: Animalia
- Phylum: Mollusca
- Class: Gastropoda
- Subclass: Caenogastropoda
- Order: Neogastropoda
- Superfamily: Conoidea
- Family: Turridae
- Genus: Taylorigemmula
- Species: T. fenestrata

Binomial name
- Taylorigemmula fenestrata (Kosuge, 1990)

Synonyms
- Gemmula fenestrata Kosuge, 1990 superseded combination

Species of gastropod

Taylorigemmula fenestrata is a species of sea snail, a marine gastropod mollusk in the family Turridae, the turrids.
