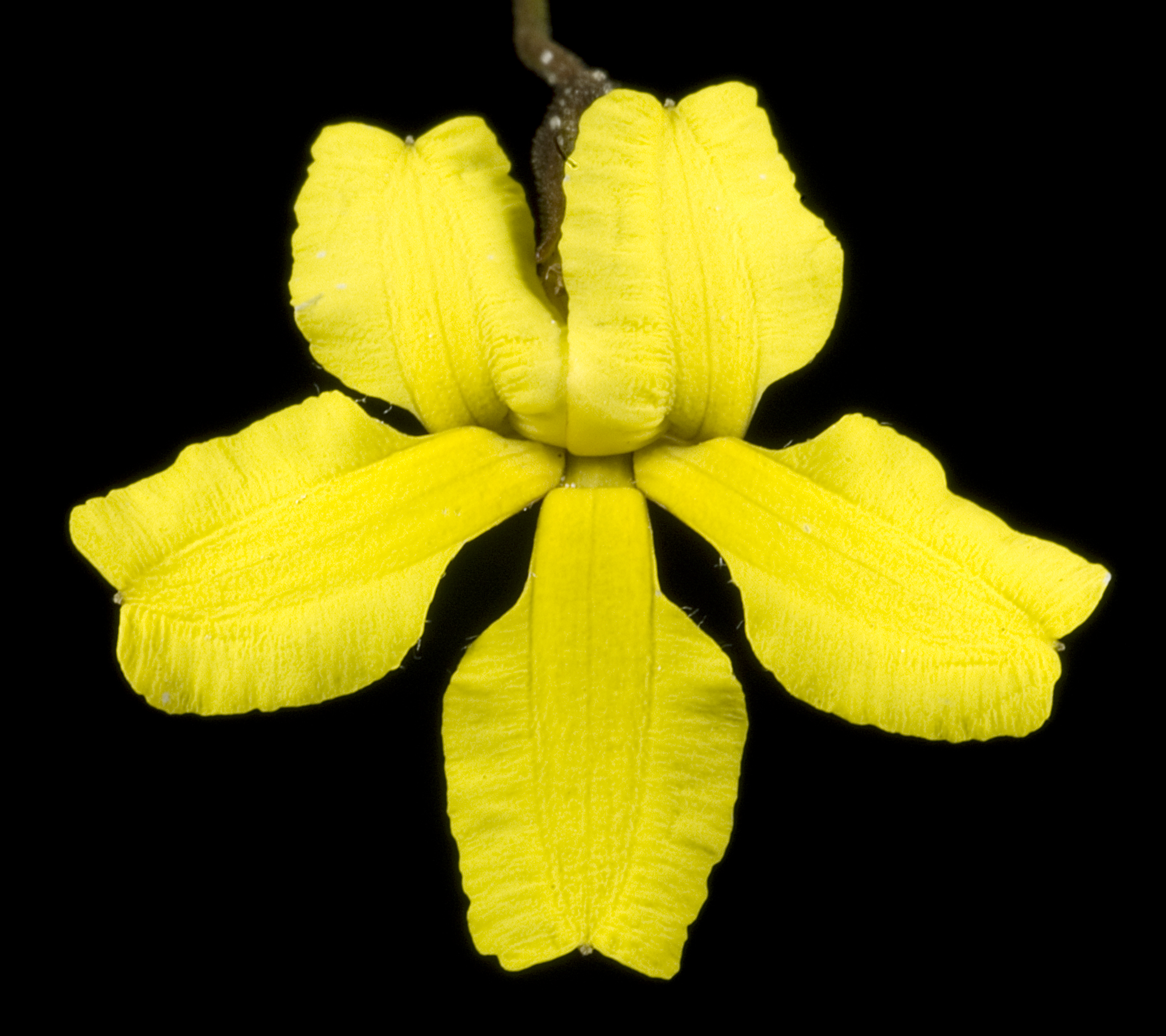

Scientific classification
- Kingdom: Plantae
- Clade: Tracheophytes
- Clade: Angiosperms
- Clade: Eudicots
- Clade: Asterids
- Order: Asterales
- Family: Goodeniaceae
- Genus: Goodenia
- Species: G. concinna

Binomial name
- Goodenia concinna Benth.

= Goodenia concinna =

Species of plant

Goodenia concinna is a species of flowering plant in the family Goodeniaceae and endemic to coastal area of southern Western Australia. It is a perennial, herb with linear to lance-shaped leaves, and racemes of yellow or cream-coloured flowers.

== Description ==
Goodenia concinna is an erect to ascending perennial herb that typically grows to a height of 15–40 cm (5.9–15.7 in). The leaves at the base of the plant are linear to lance-shaped, 30–90 mm (1.2–3.5 in) long and 1–8 mm (0.039–0.315 in) wide. The flowers are arranged in a raceme up to 80 mm (3.1 in) long with leaf-like bracts at the base, each flower on a pedicel 10–20 mm (0.39–0.79 in) long. The sepals are lance-shaped to narrow elliptic, 1.5–2.5 mm (0.059–0.098 in) long and the corolla is yellow to cream-coloured and 10–14 mm (0.39–0.55 in) long. The lower lobes of the corolla are 4.5–5.5 mm (0.18–0.22 in) long with wings about 1.5 mm (0.059 in) wide. Flowering occurs from August to November and the fruit is a more or less spherical capsule 5–6 mm (0.20–0.24 in) long.

== Taxonomy and naming ==
Goodenia concinna was first formally described in 1868 by George Bentham in Flora Australiensis. The specific epithet (concinna) means "neat, pretty or elegant".

== Distribution and habitat ==
This goodenia grows in sandy heath and forest near the south coast of Western Australia.

== Conservation status ==
Goddenia concinna is classified as "not threatened" by the Department of Environment and Conservation (Western Australia).
