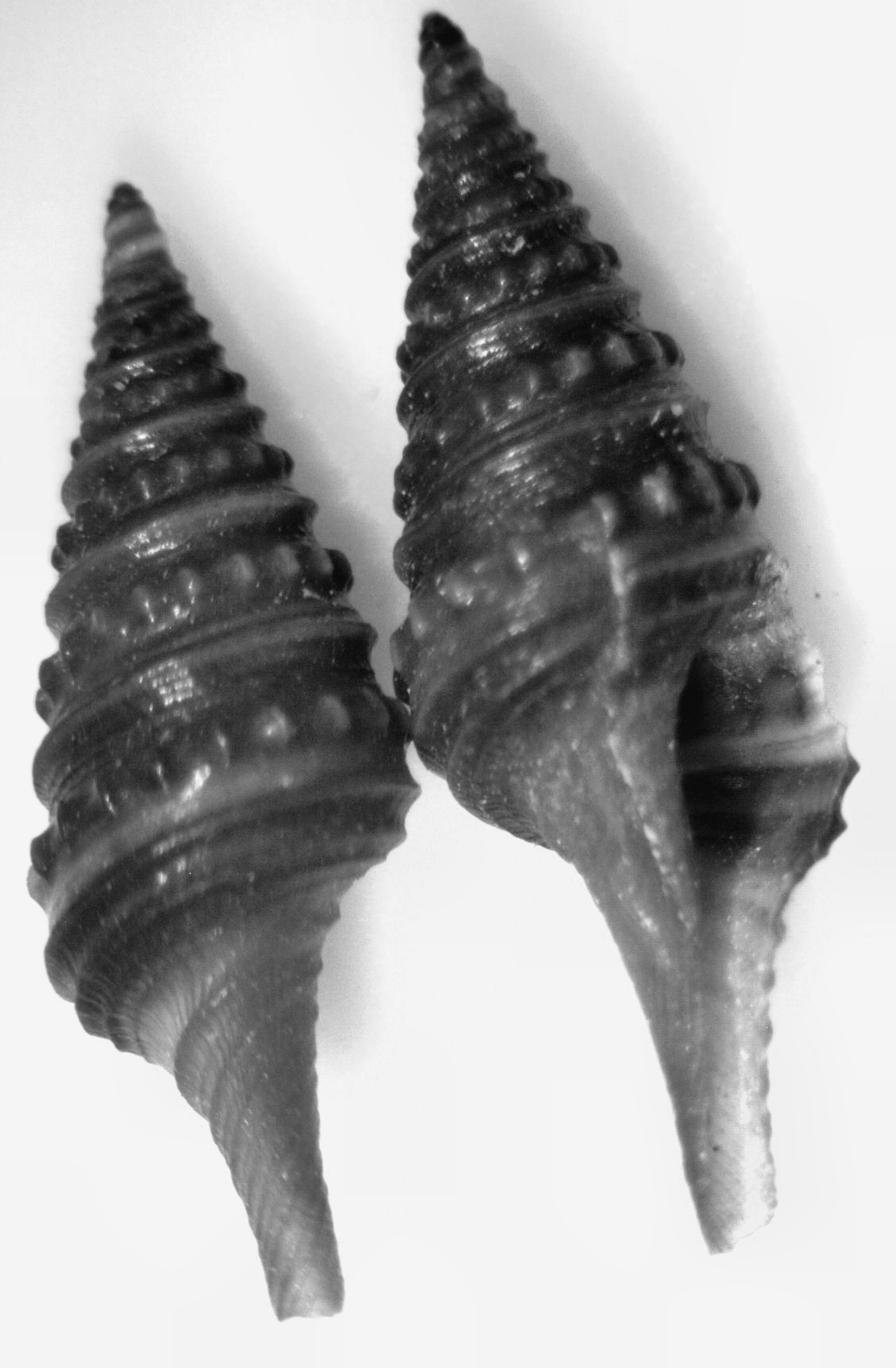
- Shell of Kilburnigemmula gemmulina

Scientific classification
- Kingdom: Animalia
- Phylum: Mollusca
- Class: Gastropoda
- Subclass: Caenogastropoda
- Order: Neogastropoda
- Superfamily: Conoidea
- Family: Turridae
- Genus: Kilburnigemmula
- Species: K. gemmulina

Binomial name
- Kilburnigemmula gemmulina (Martens, 1902)

Synonyms
- Gemmula gemmulina (E. von Martens, 1902) superseded combination; Gemmula (Gemmula) gemmulina (Martens, 1902à; Pleurotoma gemmulina Martens, 1902

= Kilburnigemmula gemmulina =

Species of gastropod

Kilburnigemmula gemmulina is a species of sea snail, a marine gastropod mollusk in the family Turridae, the turrids.

== Description ==
The length of the shell varies between 11.1 mm and 24.8 mm.

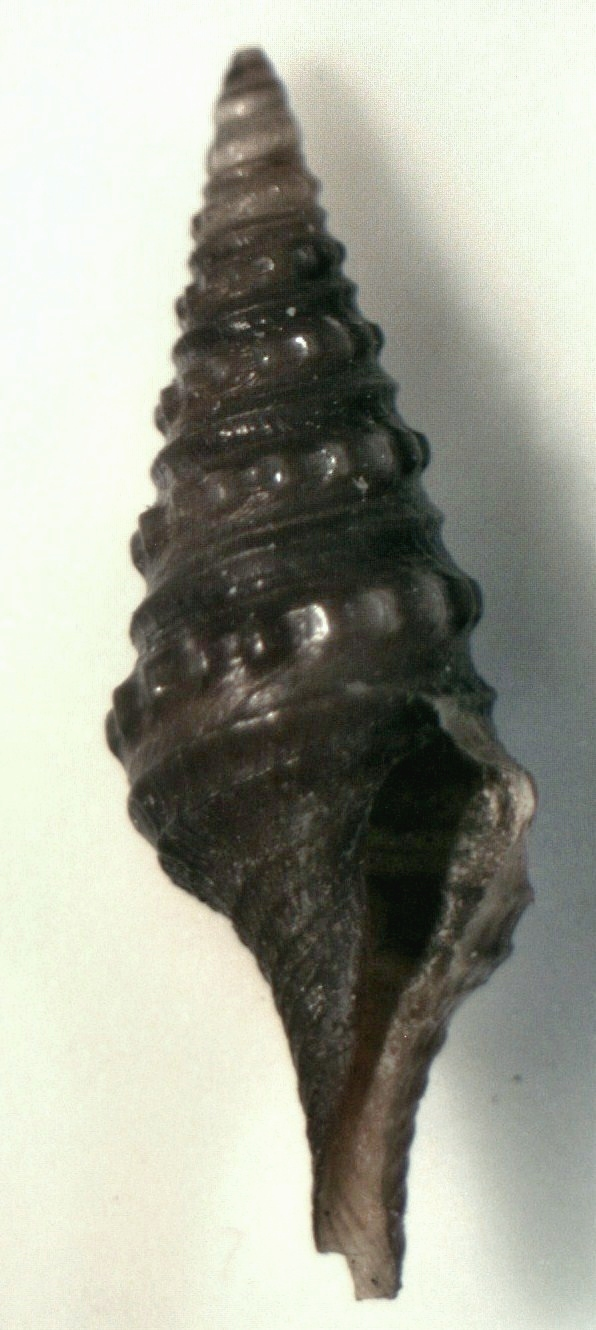
Shell of Kilburnigemmula gemmulina

== Distribution ==
This marine species occurs off Western Sumatra, Indonesia; off the Philippines and in the South China Sea.
