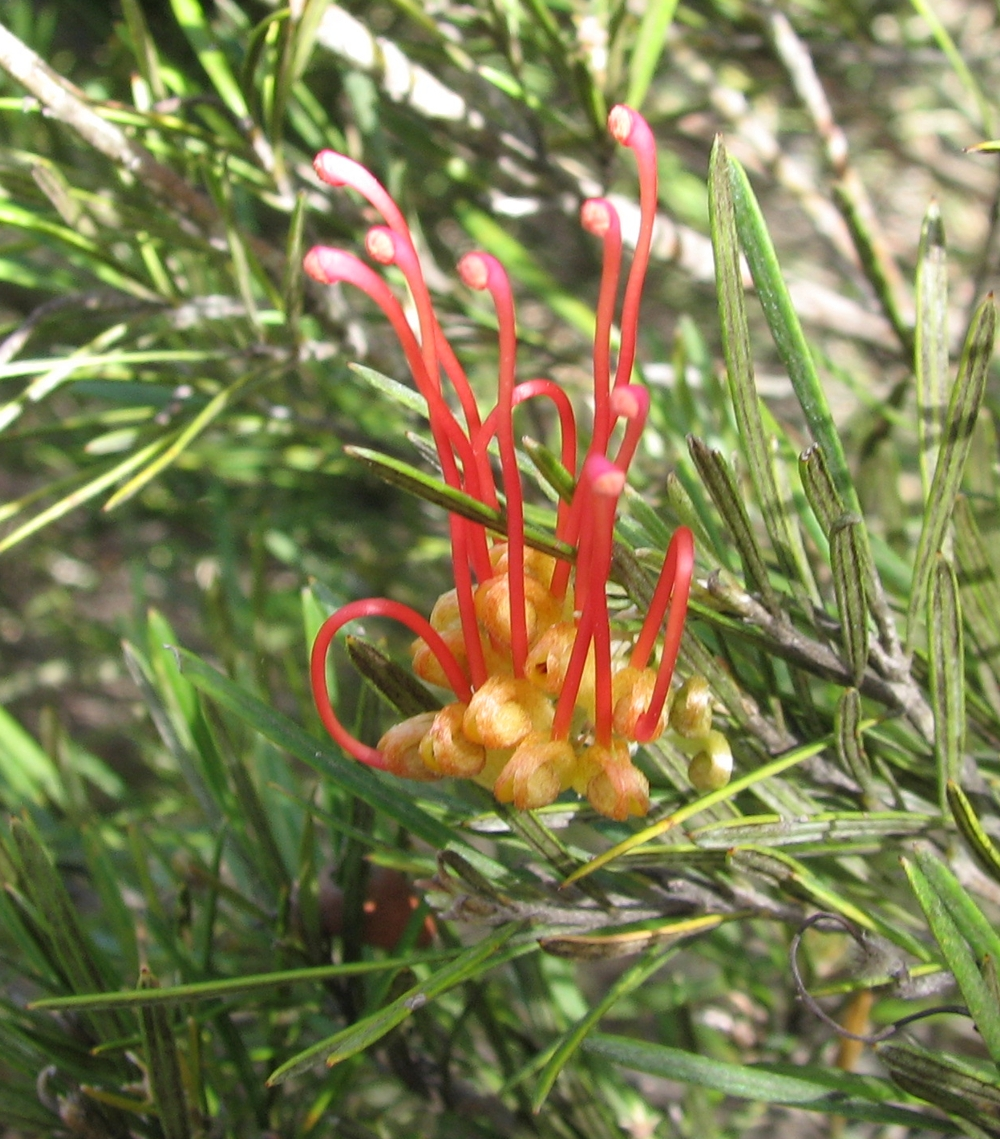
- Grevillea concinna in Maranoa Gardens

Conservation status
- Least Concern (IUCN 3.1)

Scientific classification
- Kingdom: Plantae
- Clade: Embryophytes
- Clade: Tracheophytes
- Clade: Spermatophytes
- Clade: Angiosperms
- Clade: Eudicots
- Order: Proteales
- Family: Proteaceae
- Genus: Grevillea
- Species: G. concinna

Binomial name
- Grevillea concinna R.Br.

Subspecies
- Grevillea concinna subsp. concinna McGill.; Grevillea concinna subsp. lemanniana R.Br.

= Grevillea concinna =

Red combs

Species of shrub endemic to Western Australia

Grevillea concinna, commonly known as red combs or elegant grevillea, is a species of flowering plant in the family Proteaceae and is endemic to the south-west of Western Australia. It is a spreading to erect shrub with mostly linear to narrow wedge-shaped leaves sometimes with a sharp point on the tip. Flower colour varies with subspecies.

== Description ==
Grevillea concinna is a spreading to erect shrub that typically grows to a height of 0.3–1.6 m (1 ft 0 in – 5 ft 3 in). Its leaves are usually narrowly wedge-shaped or narrowly egg-shaped, 20–70 mm (0.79–2.76 in) long and 0.9–4.5 mm (0.035–0.177 in) wide. The leaves are sometimes divided with two or three linear lobes of the same dimensions as the simple leaves. The flowers are arranged in toothbrush-shaped groups on a rachis 10–30 mm (0.39–1.18 in) long, the pistil 23–26 mm (0.91–1.02 in) long with a glabrous style. Flower colour varies with subspecies, being silvery to cream-coloured or yellowish green for subsp. concinna and lemonish-green, later orange-brown. The fruit is a hairy follicle 10–14.5 mm (0.39–0.57 in) long.

== Taxonomy ==
Grevillea concinna was first formally described in 1810 by Robert Brown in the Transactions of the Linnean Society of London. The specific epithet (concinna) means "neat, pretty or elegant".

In 1986, Donald McGillivray described two subspecies in his book, New Names in Grevillea (Proteaceae) and the names are accepted by the Australian Plant Census:

- Grevillea concinna subsp. concinna McGill. has silvery to cream-coloured or yellowish-green flowers with a bright red to pink style;
- Grevillea concinna R.Br. subsp. lemanniana has lemony-green flowers, later orange-brown, and a bright red style.

== Distribution and habitat ==
Subspecies concinna grows in coastal shrubland between Cape Le Grand and Lucky Bay and subsp. lehmanniana grows in heath, scrub or shrubland between Boxwood Hill, Needilup, Ravensthorpe and Cape Arid National Park in the Esperance Plains and Mallee biogeographic regions of south-western Western Australia.

== Conservation status ==
Grevillea concinna is listed as least concern on the IUCN Red List of Threatened Species. Both subspecies of G. concinna are listed as not threatened by the Department of Biodiversity, Conservation and Attractions.
