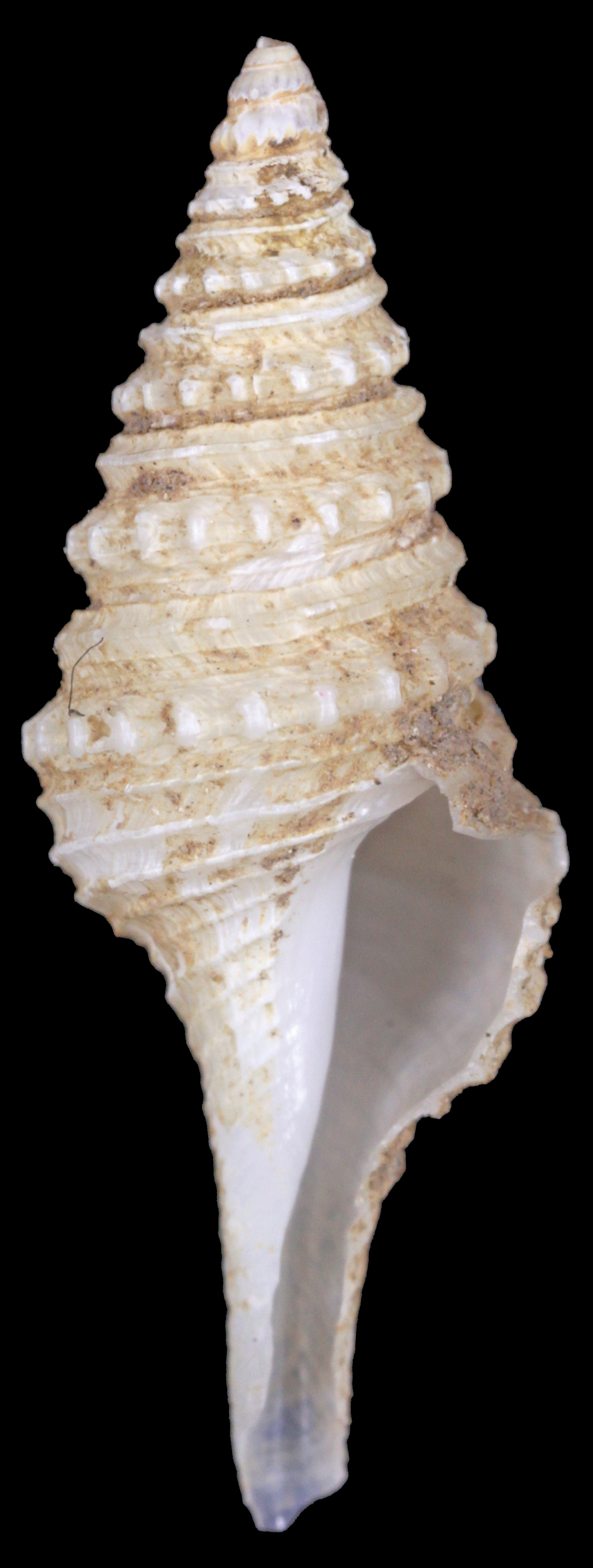
- Shell of Powelligemmula rarimaculata (specimen at MNHN, Paris)

Scientific classification
- Kingdom: Animalia
- Phylum: Mollusca
- Class: Gastropoda
- Subclass: Caenogastropoda
- Order: Neogastropoda
- Superfamily: Conoidea
- Family: Turridae
- Genus: Powelligemmula
- Species: P. rarimaculata

Binomial name
- Powelligemmula rarimaculata (Kuroda, Habe & Oyama, 1971)

Synonyms
- Gemmula (Gemmula) rarimaculata Kuroda and Oyama, 1971; Gemmula rarimaculata Kuroda & Oyama, 1971 superseded combination

= Powelligemmula rarimaculata =

Species of gastropod

Powelligemmula rarimaculata is a species of sea snail, a marine gastropod mollusk in the family Turridae, the turrids.

== Description ==
The length of the shell varies between 17 mm and 27 mm.

== Distribution ==
This species occurs in the Indian Ocean; in the Solomon Sea; off Japan; in the South China Sea; off the Fiji Islands, Queensland, Western Australia and the Philippines.
