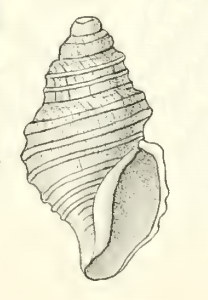
- Drawing of a shell of Taranis gratiosa

Scientific classification
- Kingdom: Animalia
- Phylum: Mollusca
- Class: Gastropoda
- Subclass: Caenogastropoda
- Order: Neogastropoda
- Superfamily: Conoidea
- Family: Raphitomidae
- Genus: Taranis; Jeffreys, 1870

Type species
- Trophon moerchii Malm, 1861

Species
- See text

Synonyms
- Allo Jousseaume, 1934; Feliciella Lamy, 1934; Fenestrosyrinx Finlay, 1926; Mangelia (Taranis) Jeffreys, 1870; Pleurotoma (Taranis) Jeffreys, 1870

= Taranis (gastropod) =

Genus of gastropods

Taranis is a genus of sea snails, marine gastropod mollusks in the family Raphitomidae.

This genus was formerly placed in subfamily Borsoniinae, family Turridae in Vaught (1989).

The name Taranis is the Latinised name of the Gallic thunder god Taran. It is therefore a masculine name.

== Description ==
The species in this genus are characterized by the absence of a radula together with the loss or reduction of a number of other features of foregut anatomy (as described by Kantor & Sysoev (1989) ).

== Species ==
Species within the genus Taranis include:

- Taranis adenensis Morassi & Bonfitto, 2013
- † Taranis aliena (Marwick, 1965)
- Taranis allo (Lamy, 1934)
- Taranis benthicola (Dell, 1956)
- Taranis borealis Bouchet & Warén, 1980
- † Taranis circumflexa (Hornung, 1920)
- Taranis columbella Kilburn, 1991
- Taranis granata (Hedley, 1922)
- Taranis gratiosa (Suter, 1908)
- Taranis imporcata (Dell, 1962)
- Taranis inkasa Kilburn, 1991
- Taranis laevisculpta Monterosato, 1880
- Taranis leptalea (Verrill, 1884)
- Taranis mayi (Verco, 1909)
- Taranis miranda Thiele, 1925
- Taranis moerchii (Malm, 1861)
- Taranis nexilis (Hutton, 1885)
- Taranis panope Dall, 1919
- Taranis percarinata Powell, 1967
- Taranis rhytismeis (Melvill, 1910)
- Taranis spirulata (Dell, 1962)
- Taranis tanata Figueira & Absalão, 2010
- Taranis ticaonica Powell, 1967
- Taranis turritispira (Smith E. A., 1882)

Species brought into synonymy

- Taranis aculeata May, 1915: synonym of Nepotilla aculeata (May, 1915)
- Taranis albatrossi Nordsieck, 1971: synonym of Drilliola emendata (Monterosato, 1872)
- Taranis alexandrina Sturany, 1896: synonym of Taranis moerchii (Malm, 1861)
- Taranis amoena G.O. Sars, 1878: synonym of Nepotilla amoena (Sars G. O., 1878)
- Taranis amphitrites Kilburn, 1991: synonym of Taranidaphne amphitrites Morassi & Bonfitto, 2001
- Taranis cirrata (Brugnone, 1862): synonym of Taranis moerchii (Malm, 1861)
- Taranis corneus Okutani, 1966: synonym of Cryptogemma cornea (Okutani, 1966)
- Taranis demersa Tiberi, 1868: synonym of Taranis moerchi (Malm, 1861)
- Taranis emendata Monterosato, 1872: synonym of Drilliola emendata (Monterosato, 1872)
- Taranis japonicus Okutani, 1964: synonym of Cryptogemma japonica (Okutani, 1964)
- Taranis jousseaumei Lamy, 1934: synonym of Taranis allo (Jousseaume, 1934)
- Taranis malmii (Dall, 1889): synonym of Mioawateria malmii (Dall, 1889)
- Taranis microscopica May, 1915: synonym of Nepotilla microscopica (May, 1915) (original combination)
- Taranis moerchi [sic]: synonym of Taranis moerchii (Malm, 1861)
- Taranis moerchii (Malm, 1861) sensu Dall, 1881: synonym of Mioawateria malmii (Dall, 1889)
- Taranis monterosatoi Locard, 1897: synonym of Oenopota graphica (Locard, 1897)
- Taranis nezi Okutani, 1964: synonym of Nepotilla nezi (Okutani, 1964)
- Taranis parvulum Locard, 1897: synonym of Taranis borealis Bouchet & Warén, 1980
- Taranis pulchella Verrill, 1880: synonym of Drilliola loprestiana (Calcara, 1841)
- Taranis tholoides Watson, 1882 : synonym of Kryptos tholoides (Watson, 1882)
- Taranis thomsoni Mestayer, 1919: synonym of Taranis nexilis bicarinata (Suter, 1915)
- Taranis tornata Verrill, 1884 : synonym of Taranis moerchi tornata Verrill, 1884
- Taranis zeuxippe Dall, 1919: synonym of Microdrillia zeuxippe (Dall, 1919)
