= Nepotilla marmorata =

Scientific classification
- Kingdom: Animalia
- Phylum: Mollusca
- Class: Gastropoda
- Subclass: Caenogastropoda
- Order: Neogastropoda
- Superfamily: Conoidea
- Family: Raphitomidae
- Genus: Nepotilla
- Species: N. marmorata

Binomial name
- Nepotilla marmorata (Verco, 1909)

Synonyms
- Daphnella marmorata Verco, 1909; Nepotilla minuta marmorata (var.) (Verco, 1909)

Species of gastropod

Nepotilla marmorata is a species of sea snail, a marine gastropod mollusk in the family Raphitomidae.

Daphnella marmorata (Verco, 1909) is a junior homonym of Daphnella marmorata Hinds, 1844

== Description ==
Joseph Verco (1909) and J.K. Tucker (2004) considered this species as a variety of Nepotilla minuta. Verco described it as beautifully marbled with flames of white and deep blackish-brown.

Charles Hedley (1922) considered it as a variety of Nepotilla mimica

== Distribution ==
This marine species is endemic to Australia and occurs off New South Wales, South Australia and Tasmania
