= Zenepos =

Scientific classification
- Kingdom: Animalia
- Phylum: Mollusca
- Class: Gastropoda
- Subclass: Caenogastropoda
- Order: Neogastropoda
- Superfamily: Conoidea
- Family: Raphitomidae
- Genus: Zenepos; Finlay, 1926

Type species
- Daphnella totolirata Suter, 1908

Species
- See text

Genus of gastropods

Zenepos is a genus of sea snails, marine gastropod mollusks in the family Raphitomidae.

== Species ==
Species within the genus Zenepos include:

- † Zenepos lacunosa (Hutton, 1885)
- Zenepos totolirata (Suter, 1908)
- Zenepos ziervogelii (Gmelin, 1791)

Species brought into synonymy

- Zenepos mimica (Sowerby III, 1897): synonym of Nepotilla mimica (Sowerby III, 1897)
- Zenepos minuta (Tenison-Woods, 1877): synonym of Nepotilla minuta (Tenison-Woods, 1877)
