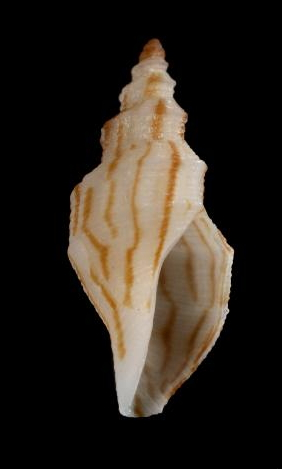
- Eucyclotoma sp. (specimen at MNHN, Paris)

Scientific classification
- Kingdom: Animalia
- Phylum: Mollusca
- Class: Gastropoda
- Subclass: Caenogastropoda
- Order: Neogastropoda
- Superfamily: Conoidea
- Family: Raphitomidae
- Genus: Eucyclotoma; Boettger, 1895

Type species
- Pleurotoma lymneiformis Kiener, 1840

Species
- See text

Synonyms
- Turrhyssa Dall, 1924

= Eucyclotoma =

Genus of gastropods

Eucyclotoma is a genus of sea snails, marine gastropod mollusks in the family Raphitomidae.

== Species ==
Species within the genus Eucyclotoma include:

- Eucyclotoma albomacula Kay, 1979
- Eucyclotoma bicarinata (Pease, 1863)
- Eucyclotoma carinulata (Souverbie, 1875)
- Eucyclotoma cingulata (Dall, 1890)
- Eucyclotoma cymatodes (Hervier, 1897)
- Eucyclotoma exilis (Dunker, 1871)
- Eucyclotoma hindsii (Reeve, 1843)
- Eucyclotoma inquinata (Reeve, 1845)
- Eucyclotoma stegeri (McGinty, 1955)
- Eucyclotoma tricarinata (Kiener, 1840)
- Eucyclotoma trivaricosa (Martens, 1880)

Species brought into synonymy

- Eucyclotoma fusiformis (Garrett, 1873): synonym of Asperdaphne lactea (Reeve, 1843) (junior subjective synonym)
- Eucyclotoma lactea (Reeve, 1843): synonym of Asperdaphne lactea (Reeve, 1843) (junior subjective synonym)
- Eucyclotoma minuta Reeve, 1844 : synonym of Nepotilla minuta (Tenison-Woods, 1877)
- Eucyclotoma molleri (Reeve, 1846): synonym of Eucyclotoma lactea (Reeve, 1843)
- Eucyclotoma nobilis Hedley, 1922: synonym of Eucyclotoma tricarinata (Kiener, 1840)
- Eucyclotoma pulcherrima Adams, 1871 : synonym of Eucyclotoma exilis (Dunker, 1871)
- Eucyclotoma ticaonica Reeve, 1845: synonym of Daphnella ticaonica (Reeve, 1845)
- Eucyclotoma tricarinata Reeve, 1843 : synonym of Eucyclotoma exilis (Dunker, 1871)
- Eucyclotoma varicifera (Pease, 1868): synonym of Asperdaphne aureola (Reeve, 1845) (junior subjective synonym)
