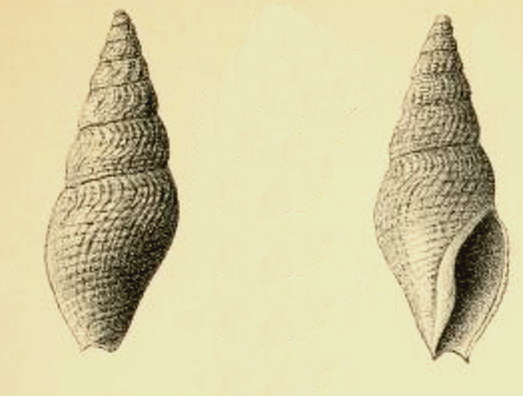
- Shell of Asthenotoma lamothei

Scientific classification
- Kingdom: Animalia
- Phylum: Mollusca
- Class: Gastropoda
- Subclass: Caenogastropoda
- Order: Neogastropoda
- Superfamily: Conoidea
- Family: Borsoniidae
- Genus: †Asthenotoma; Harris & Burrows, 1891

Type species
- †Pleurotoma meneghinii Mayer, 1868

Synonyms
- † Oligotoma Bellardi, 1875 (Invalid: junior homonym of Oligotoma Westwood, 1836; Asthenotoma is a replacement name)

= Asthenotoma =

Extinct genus of gastropods

Asthenotoma is a genus of sea snails, marine gastropod mollusks in the family Borsoniidae.

== Description ==
This genus, almost entirely represented by extinct species, is of slender form and elevated, evenly and gradually acuminate spire, conspicuous development of the spiral lyrae and short aperture. It should evidently be considered especially with Trypanotoma and allies, but it is somewhat of an annectant form, as the American species at least have true ribbing on the nepionic whorls which becomes completely lost on the larger volutions of the shell. It is therefore one of those puzzling exceptions which render an arrangement of the genera in a dichotomous table so difficult and unsatisfactory. The embryo in the type, Pleurotoma basteroti Desm., of the European Miocene, is said by Cossmann to be paucispiral, but the drawing shows a multispiral protoconch. This is, however, a matter of minor importance. The anal sinus is broad, sometimes very feeble and always median in position on the spire whorls though not identified with any particular one or more of the subequal and rather coarse flat spirals. The beak has no external oblique tumidity. There can be but little doubt, in view of geographical variations and wide distribution of this genus, that Endiatoma, of Cossmann, should be regarded as a synonym or as constituting a slightly differentiated section of Asthenotoma.

== Species ==
Species within the genus Asthenotoma include:

- † Asthenotoma angusta Lozouet, 2017
- † Asthenotoma bipunctula (S. V. Wood, 1848)
- † Asthenotoma colus (Dujardin, 1837)
- † Asthenotoma conulus (Grateloup, 1845)
- † Asthenotoma crenulata Gougerot, 1966
- † Asthenotoma falunica Peyrot, 1938
- † Asthenotoma festiva (Hörnes, 1854)
- † Asthenotoma juvenilis Lozouet, 2015
- † Asthenotoma lamothei (Dautzenberg, 1910)
- † Asthenotoma lanceolata Ceulemans, Van Dingenen & Landau, 2018
- † Asthenotoma ligata (Defrance, 1826)
- † Asthenotoma meneghinii (Mayer, 1868)
- † Asthenotoma newtoni de Boury, 1899
- † Asthenotoma ornata (Defrance, 1826)
- † Asthenotoma pannus (Basterot, 1825)
- † Asthenotoma praepannus Lozouet, 2017
- † Asthenotoma pupa (Edwards, 1861)
- Asthenotoma texta (Thiele, 1925) (original combination: Turris (Hemipleurotoma) texta)
- † Asthenotoma tuberculata (Pusch, 1837)
- † Asthenotoma vulcani Lozouet, 2017

Taxon inquirendum

- Oligotoma sirpata Jousseaume, 1891

Synonyms

- Subgenus Asthenotoma (Drilliola) Locard, 1897: synonym of Drilliola Locard, 1897
- Asthenotoma (Drilliola) emendata (Monterosato, 1872): synonym of Drilliola emendata (Monterosato, 1872)
- Asthenotoma cicatrigula Hedley, 1922: synonym of Tomopleura cicatrigula (Hedley, 1922)
- Asthenotoma eva (Thiele, 1925): synonym of Maoritomella eva (Thiele, 1925)
- †Asthenotoma exbasteroti Peyrot, 1931: synonym of † Drilliola basteroti (Des Moulins, 1842)
- Asthenotoma komakimonos Otuka, 1935: synonym of Pulsarella komakimonos (Otuka, 1935)
- † Asthenotoma obesa Peyrot, 1931: synonym of † Drilliola obesa (Peyrot, 1931)(original combination)
- Asthenotoma spiralis (E. A. Smith, 1872): synonym of Tomopleura spiralissima Gofas & Rolán, 2009
- Asthenotoma subtilinea Hedley, 1918: synonym of Tomopleura subtilinea (Hedley, 1918)
- † Asthenotoma tricarinata Peyrot, 1931: synonym of † Boettgeriola tricarinata (Peyrot, 1931) (original combination)
- Asthenotoma vertebrata (E. A. Smith, 1875): synonym of Tomopleura vertebrata (E. A. Smith, 1875)
