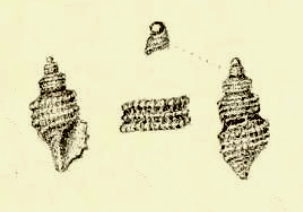
- Nepotilla lamellosa

Scientific classification
- Kingdom: Animalia
- Phylum: Mollusca
- Class: Gastropoda
- Subclass: Caenogastropoda
- Order: Neogastropoda
- Superfamily: Conoidea
- Family: Raphitomidae
- Genus: Nepotilla; Hedley, 1918

Type species
- Daphnella bathentoma Verco, 1909

Species
- See text

= Nepotilla =

Genus of gastropods

Nepotilla is a genus of sea snails, marine gastropod mollusks in the family Raphitomidae.

== Description ==
This genus is allied to Eucyclotoma by its spirally grooved protoconch, but distinguished there from by its minute size, turreted spire, and few whorls.

== Distribution ==
Species of this genus occur off New Zealand and Australia (New South Wales, Queensland, South Australia, Tasmania, Victoria).

== Species ==
Species within the genus Nepotilla include:

- Nepotilla aculeata (May, 1916)
- Nepotilla amoena (Sars G.O., 1878)
- † Nepotilla bartrumi Laws, 1939
- Nepotilla bathentoma (Verco, 1909)
- Nepotilla carinata Laseron, 1954
- Nepotilla diaphana May, 1920
- Nepotilla excavata (Gatliff, 1906)
- Nepotilla fenestrata (Verco, 1909)
- Nepotilla finlayi Powell, 1937
- Nepotilla lamellosa (Sowerby III, 1896)
- Nepotilla marmorata (Verco, 1909)
- Nepotilla microscopica (May, 1916)
- Nepotilla mimica (Sowerby III, 1896)
- Nepotilla minuta (Tenison-Woods, 1877)
- Nepotilla nezi (Okutani, 1964)
- Nepotilla nitidula Powell, 1940
- Nepotilla powelli Dell, 1956
- Nepotilla serrata Laseron, 1954
- Nepotilla triseriata (Verco, 1909)
- Nepotilla tropicalis Hedley, 1922
- Nepotilla vera Powell, 1940
