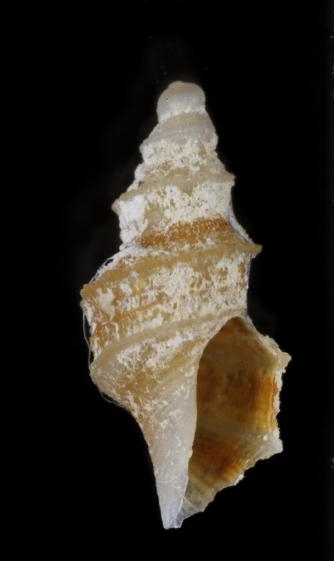
- Shell of Eucyclotoma carinulata (specimen at MNHN, Paris)

Scientific classification
- Kingdom: Animalia
- Phylum: Mollusca
- Class: Gastropoda
- Subclass: Caenogastropoda
- Order: Neogastropoda
- Superfamily: Conoidea
- Family: Raphitomidae
- Genus: Eucyclotoma
- Species: E. carinulata

Binomial name
- Eucyclotoma carinulata (Souverbie, 1875)

Synonyms
- Clathurella carinulata (Souverbie, 1875); Pleurotoma carinulata Souverbie, 1875

= Eucyclotoma carinulata =

Species of gastropod

Eucyclotoma carinulata is a species of sea snail, a marine gastropod mollusk in the family Raphitomidae.

== Description ==
The length of the shell attains 8 mm.

The shell is longitudinally obscurely ribbed, and transversely striated. The ribs disappear towards the base, where the striae become stronger. The body whorl is tricarinate, those of the spire bicarinate. The carinae are nodulous. The color of the shell is whitish, maculated with yellowish chestnut.

== Distribution ==
THis marine species occurs off New Caledonia
