= Eucyclotoma cymatodes =

Scientific classification
- Kingdom: Animalia
- Phylum: Mollusca
- Class: Gastropoda
- Subclass: Caenogastropoda
- Order: Neogastropoda
- Superfamily: Conoidea
- Family: Raphitomidae
- Genus: Eucyclotoma
- Species: E. cymatodes

Binomial name
- Eucyclotoma cymatodes (Hervier, 1897)

Synonyms
- Daphnella cymatodes Hervier, 1897

Species of gastropod

Eucyclotoma cymatodes is a species of sea snail, a marine gastropod mollusk in the family Raphitomidae.

== Description ==
The length of the shell attains 7 mm.

== Distribution ==
This marine species occurs off New Caledonia and the Philippines.
