= Taranis turritispira =

Scientific classification
- Kingdom: Animalia
- Phylum: Mollusca
- Class: Gastropoda
- Subclass: Caenogastropoda
- Order: Neogastropoda
- Superfamily: Conoidea
- Family: Raphitomidae
- Genus: Taranis
- Species: T. turritispira

Binomial name
- Taranis turritispira (E.A. Smith, 1882)

Synonyms
- Pleurotoma (Taranis ?) turritispira E.A. Smith, 1882

Species of gastropod

Taranis turritispira is a species of sea snail, a marine gastropod mollusk in the family Raphitomidae.

== Description ==
The length of the shell attains 6 mm, its diameter 2 mm.

The small, slender and narrow shell is elongately ovate and turreted. It is dark white to slightly straw colored. It contains 6 whorls of which two reddish whorls in the protoconch. Under a simple lens the two apical whorls appear almost smooth; but by the aid of a more powerful microscope they are seen to be covered with numerous close spiral series of minute granules. The consequent whorls are convex with an angulate, but not flanged periphery. They become rather flat below the angle. The clathrate sculpture is indistinct. The axial and spiral sculpture is subequal, dense and fenestrate. The spiral sculpture is dominant with three spiral cords on the upper whorls and with an additional fourth on the large body whorl. The axial ribs become subobsolete over the body whorl. The aperture is elongated and measures about half the total length. The outer lip is thin and slightly sinuate. The columella is slightly twisted and covered with a very small callus. The short siphonal canal is narrow and slightly twisted to the left.

== Distribution ==
This marine species occurs off Japan.
