= Nepotilla finlayi =

Scientific classification
- Kingdom: Animalia
- Phylum: Mollusca
- Class: Gastropoda
- Subclass: Caenogastropoda
- Order: Neogastropoda
- Superfamily: Conoidea
- Family: Raphitomidae
- Genus: Nepotilla
- Species: N. finlayi

Binomial name
- Nepotilla finlayi Powell, 1937

Species of gastropod

Nepotilla finlayi is a species of sea snail, a marine gastropod mollusk in the family Raphitomidae.

== Description ==
The length of the shell attains 2.2 mm, its diameter 1.4 mm.

== Distribution ==
This marine species is endemic to New Zealand, Exclusive Economic Zone of New Zealand and occurs off Three Kings Islands, North Island.
