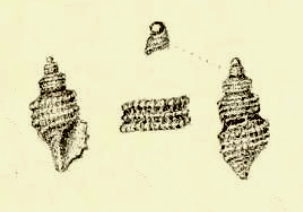
- Original image of a shell of Nepotilla lamellosa

Scientific classification
- Kingdom: Animalia
- Phylum: Mollusca
- Class: Gastropoda
- Subclass: Caenogastropoda
- Order: Neogastropoda
- Superfamily: Conoidea
- Family: Raphitomidae
- Genus: Nepotilla
- Species: N. lamellosa

Binomial name
- Nepotilla lamellosa (Sowerby III, 1896)

Synonyms
- Clathurella lamellosa Sowerby III, 1896

= Nepotilla lamellosa =

Species of gastropod

Nepotilla lamellosa is a species of sea snail, a marine gastropod mollusk in the family Raphitomidae.

== Description ==
The length of the shell attains 4 mm, its diameter 2 mm.

This is a very characteristic minute shell containing 5 whorls. The protoconch is smooth. The angular whorls of the spire form a tabulated spire. The spiral tricarinate keels, of which there are four on the body whorl, as well as the interstices, are crossed by fine close lamellae. The suture is minutely channeled. The base of the shell is contracted, lirate and slightly rostrate. The aperture is rather expanded. The outer lip is arcuate and strongly sinuated. The unique specimen is straw-coloured, with a single brown blotch in front.

== Distribution ==
This marine species is endemic to Australia and occurs off Victoria, South Australia and Tasmania
