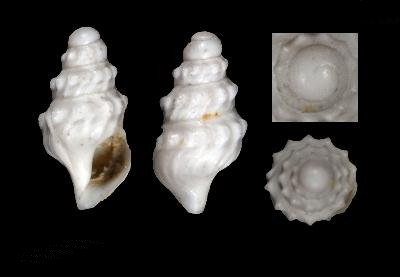
- Shell of Taranis tanata (paratype at MNHN, Paris)

Scientific classification
- Kingdom: Animalia
- Phylum: Mollusca
- Class: Gastropoda
- Subclass: Caenogastropoda
- Order: Neogastropoda
- Superfamily: Conoidea
- Family: Raphitomidae
- Genus: Taranis
- Species: T. tanata

Binomial name
- Taranis tanata Figueira & Absalão, 2010

= Taranis tanata =

Species of gastropod

Taranis tanata is a species of sea snail, a marine gastropod mollusk in the family Raphitomidae.

== Description ==
The length of the shell attains 1.7 mm (0.067 in).

== Distribution ==
This marine species is endemic to Southeast Brazil.
