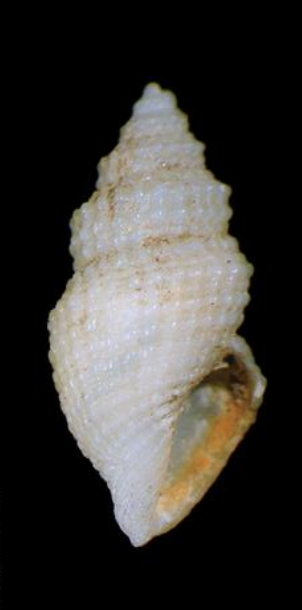
- shell of Taranis granata (specimen at the Australian Museum)

Scientific classification
- Kingdom: Animalia
- Phylum: Mollusca
- Class: Gastropoda
- Subclass: Caenogastropoda
- Order: Neogastropoda
- Superfamily: Conoidea
- Family: Raphitomidae
- Genus: Taranis
- Species: T. granata

Binomial name
- Taranis granata (Hedley, 1922)

Synonyms
- Daphnella granata Hedley, 1922 (original combination); Fenestrosyrinx granata (Hedley, 1922)

= Taranis granata =

Species of gastropod

Taranis granata is a species of sea snail, a marine gastropod mollusk in the family Raphitomidae.

== Description ==
The length of the shell attains 6.5 mm, its diameter 3 mm.

(Original description) The shell is relatively small, solid, ovate, and sharply gradate, with a uniform buff coloration. It consists of seven whorls, including the protoconch. The whorls are contracted at the suture, angled at the shoulder, rounded at the periphery, and slightly concave at the base.

Sculpture: The surface is reticulated by elevated, flat-topped spirals and radials, which are of equal prominence on the upper whorls, creating deep, square-shaped meshes. On the body whorl, there are about twenty-five radials, while the antepenultimate whorl has around twenty. These radials gradually diminish in size towards the anterior and disappear at the base. The body whorl features approximately seventeen spirals, not including a few minute interstitial threads. The penultimate whorl has three spirals, and the earlier whorls have two. The protoconch consists of two rounded whorls that appear smooth to the naked eye but reveal faint, minute oblique reticulation under high magnification. The aperture is incomplete in the only known specimen.

== Distribution ==
The holotype of this marine species was found off Queensland, Australia.
