= Nepotilla nitidula =

Scientific classification
- Kingdom: Animalia
- Phylum: Mollusca
- Class: Gastropoda
- Subclass: Caenogastropoda
- Order: Neogastropoda
- Superfamily: Conoidea
- Family: Raphitomidae
- Genus: Nepotilla
- Species: N. nitidula

Binomial name
- Nepotilla nitidula Powell, 1940

Species of gastropod

Nepotilla nitidula is a species of sea snail, a marine gastropod mollusk in the family Raphitomidae.

== Description ==
The length of the shell attains 2.5 mm, its diameter 1.3 mm.

== Distribution ==
This marine species is endemic to New Zealand and occurs off Northland east coast to Poor Knights Islands.
