= Taranis inkasa =

Scientific classification
- Kingdom: Animalia
- Phylum: Mollusca
- Class: Gastropoda
- Subclass: Caenogastropoda
- Order: Neogastropoda
- Superfamily: Conoidea
- Family: Raphitomidae
- Genus: Taranis
- Species: T. inkasa

Binomial name
- Taranis inkasa Kilburn, 1991

Species of gastropod

Taranis inkasa is a species of sea snail, a marine gastropod mollusk in the family Raphitomidae.

== Description ==
The length of the shell attains 3.8 mm, its diameter is 1.7 mm.

== Distribution ==
This marine species is endemic to South Africa and occurs on the continental shelf off Durban and northern Natal, at a depth of about 85–110 m.
