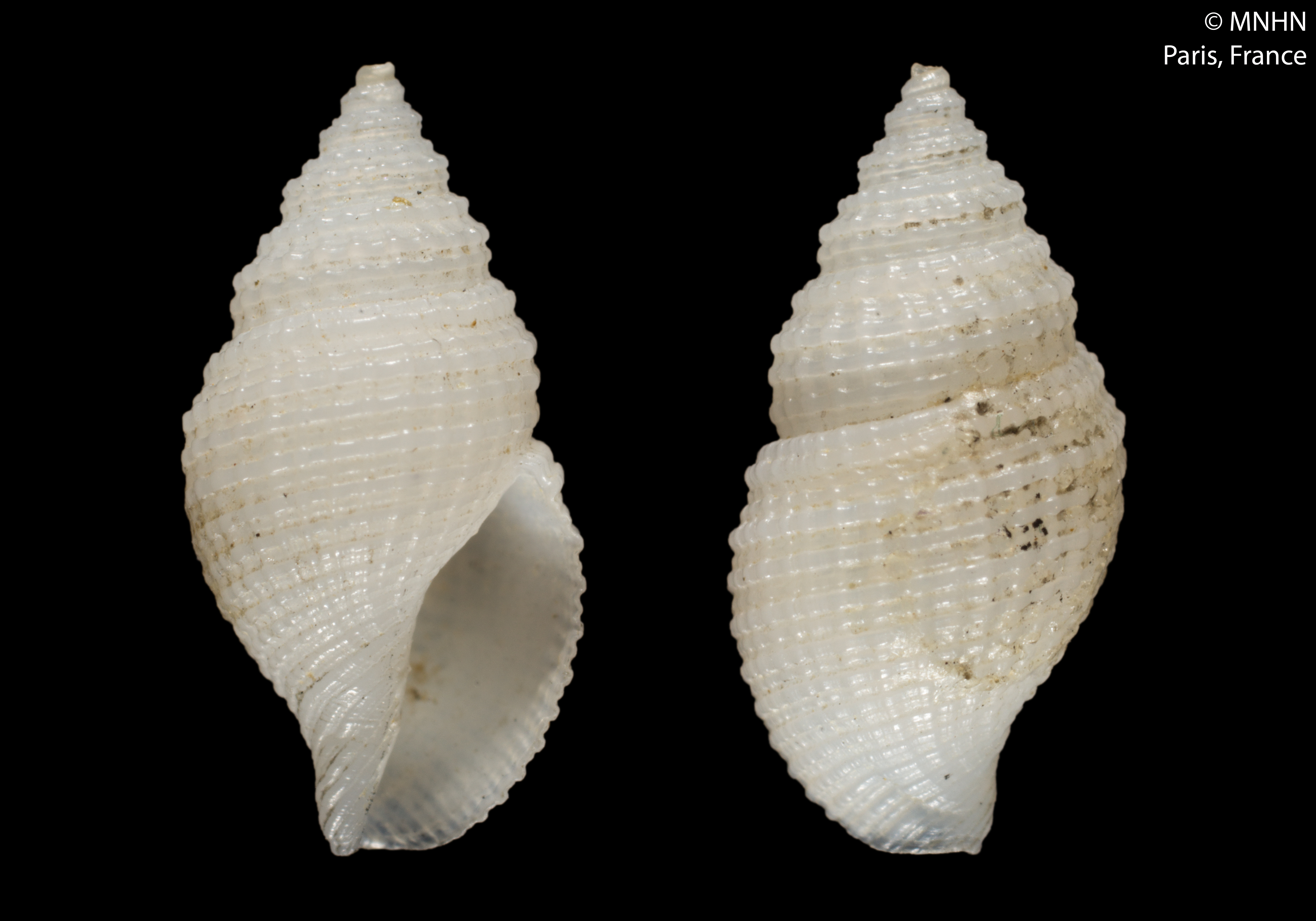
- Taranidaphne hongkongensis

Scientific classification
- Kingdom: Animalia
- Phylum: Mollusca
- Class: Gastropoda
- Subclass: Caenogastropoda
- Order: Neogastropoda
- Superfamily: Conoidea
- Family: Raphitomidae
- Genus: Taranidaphne; Morassi & Bonfitto, 2001

Type species
- Taranidaphne dufresnei Morassi & Bonfitto, 2001

Species
- See text

= Taranidaphne =

Genus of gastropods

Taranidaphne is a genus of sea snails, marine gastropod mollusks in the family Raphitomidae.

== Species ==
Species within the genus Taranidaphne include:

- Taranidaphne amphitrites (Melvill & Standen, 1903)
- Taranidaphne beblammena (Sturany, 1903)
- Taranidaphne dufresnei Morassi & Bonfitto, 2001
- Taranidaphne hongkongensis (Sowerby III, 1889)
- Taranidaphne nereidum (Melvill & Standen, 1903)
