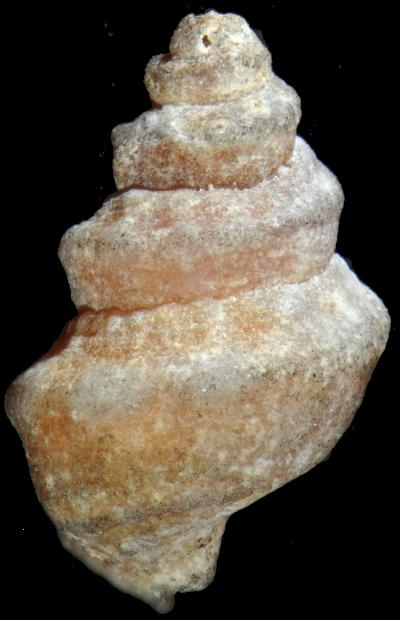
- Shell of Taranis allo (holotype in the MNHN, Paris)

Scientific classification
- Kingdom: Animalia
- Phylum: Mollusca
- Class: Gastropoda
- Subclass: Caenogastropoda
- Order: Neogastropoda
- Superfamily: Conoidea
- Family: Raphitomidae
- Genus: Taranis
- Species: T. allo

Binomial name
- Taranis allo (Jousseaume, 1934)

Synonyms
- Allo allo Jousseaume, 1934 (original combination); Feliciella jousseaumei Lamy, 1934 (Unnecessary substitute name for Allo allo); Taranis jousseaumei Lamy, 1934

= Taranis allo =

Species of gastropod

Taranis allo is a species of sea snail, a marine gastropod mollusk in the family Raphitomidae.

== Description ==
The length of the shell attains 4.5 mm, its diameter is 3 mm.

== Distribution ==
This marine species occurs off Djibouti.
