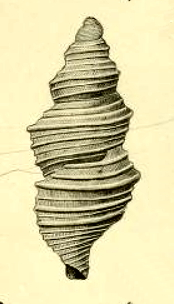
- Original image of a shell of Nepotilla triseriata

Scientific classification
- Kingdom: Animalia
- Phylum: Mollusca
- Class: Gastropoda
- Subclass: Caenogastropoda
- Order: Neogastropoda
- Superfamily: Conoidea
- Family: Raphitomidae
- Genus: Nepotilla
- Species: N. triseriata

Binomial name
- Nepotilla triseriata (Verco, 1909)

Synonyms
- Daphnella triseriata Verco, 1909

= Nepotilla triseriata =

Species of gastropod

Nepotilla triseriata is a species of sea snail, a marine gastropod mollusk in the family Raphitomidae.

== Description ==
The length of the shell attains 4.6 mm, its diameter 2.4 mm.

(Original description) The shell consists of 6 whorls, including the protoconch of 2 whorls, with an exsert apex, closely spirally lirate. When viewed from the apex, the contour of the spire whorls is not uniformly curved, but polygonal, and septangulate in the type. They have a central angulation, provided with a stout, rounded cord, and are constricted at the linear sutures. In the first and second spire-whorls, a smaller secondary lira arises above the angle and another below. In the third whorl another tertiary and still smaller lira is intercalated above, and another in each interval below. In the body whorl, below these, arising at the suture is a stout cord forming a second angulation, below which the base is markedly concavely onstricted, and has about ten lirae, diminishing in size anteriorly. The aperture is obliquely oval, narrowed behind. The columella is straightly convex. The outer lip is thin, simple, crenulated, and toothed by the spirals. With a deep, narrow posterior sinus, bounded on one side by the sutural lira, and on the other by the nearest secondary lira. In profile the lip is convex. Very fine crowded axial striae, corresponding with the sinuosity of the outer lip, cross the whole surface except the primary spirals.

== Distribution ==
This marine species is endemic to Australia and occurs of Victoria, South Australia and Tasmania
