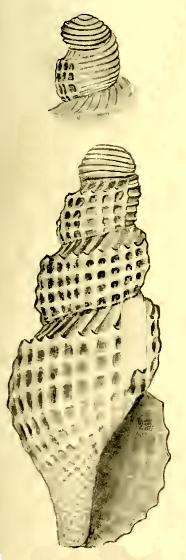
- Original image of a shell and the protoconch of Nepotilla fenestrata

Scientific classification
- Kingdom: Animalia
- Phylum: Mollusca
- Class: Gastropoda
- Subclass: Caenogastropoda
- Order: Neogastropoda
- Superfamily: Conoidea
- Family: Raphitomidae
- Genus: Nepotilla
- Species: N. fenestrata

Binomial name
- Nepotilla fenestrata (Verco, 1909)

Synonyms
- Daphnella fenestrata Verco, 1909

= Nepotilla fenestrata =

Species of gastropod

Nepotilla fenestrata is a species of sea snail, a marine gastropod mollusk in the family Raphitomidae.

== Description ==
The length of the shell attains 4 mm, its diameter 1.5 mm.

(Original description) The delicate, white shell contains 5 whorls, including a rather blunt scarcely mamillate protoconch of 2 convex whorls, with 7 spiral lirae, ending abruptly at the first axial rib. The whorls of the spire are gradate, subconcavely sloping below the suture, with a sharp lira at the edge of the gradation. The whorls contract towards the lower suture. The body whorl is contracted at the base. The siphonal canal is very short. The aperture is oblong-oval. The outer lip is thin, with ten lirae outside, which with the lip in profile project as minute spurs. The sinus is well marked from the suture to the angle. The inner lip shows a narrow, opaque-white glaze. The columella is long, straightly convex. The sculpture consists of bold, five spirals in the first and second whorls, including that at the angle, fourteen on the body whorl, narrow, erect. The axials, twenty in the penultimate, coronate the uppermost spiral with projecting points, and produce tiny tubercles as they cross the other spirals. Crowded axial threads, concave forwards, run from the simple suture to the angle.

== Distribution ==
This marine species is endemic to Australia and occurs off South Australia and Tasmania
