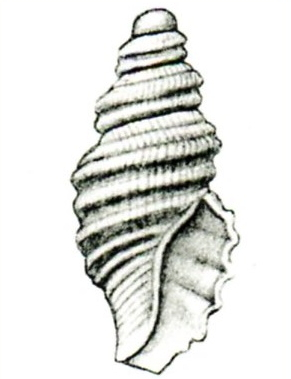
- Shell of Taranis miranda (holotype)

Scientific classification
- Kingdom: Animalia
- Phylum: Mollusca
- Class: Gastropoda
- Subclass: Caenogastropoda
- Order: Neogastropoda
- Superfamily: Conoidea
- Family: Raphitomidae
- Genus: Taranis
- Species: T. miranda

Binomial name
- Taranis miranda Thiele, 1925

Synonyms
- Asthenotoma eva (non Bela eva Thiele, 1925); Taranis (Nepotilla) miranda Thiele, 1925

= Taranis miranda =

Species of gastropod

Taranis miranda is a species of sea snail, a marine gastropod mollusk in the family Raphitomidae.

== Description ==
The length of the shell attains 3.8 mm, its diameter is 1.7 mm. The shell is described as elongate, and biconic (meaning that the widest part is roughly in the middle, with a conical shape tapering above and below it), and having strong spiral ridges.

== Distribution ==
This marine species is endemic to South Africa and occurs off the Agulhas Bank, from off Cape Agulhas to off Cape Recife, at depths of 80–125 m.
