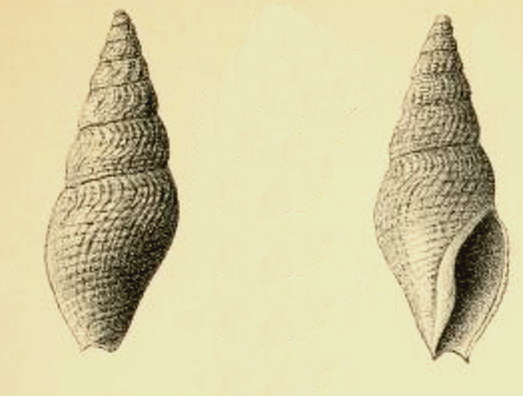
- Original drawing of a shell of Asthenotoma lamothei

Scientific classification
- Kingdom: Animalia
- Phylum: Mollusca
- Class: Gastropoda
- Subclass: Caenogastropoda
- Order: Neogastropoda
- Superfamily: Conoidea
- Family: Borsoniidae
- Genus: †Asthenotoma
- Species: †A. lamothei

Binomial name
- †Asthenotoma lamothei (Dautzenberg, 1910)

Synonyms
- Genotia (Oligotoma) lamothei Dautzenberg, 1910

= Asthenotoma lamothei =

Species of gastropod

Asthenotoma lamothei is a species of sea snail, a marine gastropod mollusk in the family Borsoniidae.

== Description ==
The size of the shell varies between 6 mm and 14 mm. The shell has a white color turning to light fawn at the top of the spire.

(Original description, translated from French into English) The solid shell has a fusiform shape. It consists of one turreted and elongated, conical spirewith 7 1/2 barely convex whorls. The first two (embryonic) are smooth and shiny, the other grated with decurrent spiral striae (5 or 6 on the penultimate whorl and about fifteen on the last) and by well marked growth lines, strongly arched in the middle of the upper striae on top of the last. The aperture is fairly narrow, not reaching half the total height of the shell and terminating at the base in a very short, wide open canal. The columellar edge is arched at the top, then with a plicate projection turning obliquely downward. This edge is provided with an eye-catching and limited callus. The lip is simple, smooth on the inside, deeply indented at the top and prominent in the middle.

== Distribution ==
This marine species occurs in the Atlantic Ocean off Morocco and Mauritania.
