= Taranis columbella =

Scientific classification
- Kingdom: Animalia
- Phylum: Mollusca
- Class: Gastropoda
- Subclass: Caenogastropoda
- Order: Neogastropoda
- Superfamily: Conoidea
- Family: Raphitomidae
- Genus: Taranis
- Species: T. columbella

Binomial name
- Taranis columbella Kilburn, 1991

Species of gastropod

Taranis columbella is a species of sea snail, a marine gastropod mollusk in the family Raphitomidae.

== Description ==
The length of the shell attains 4.6 mm, (0.18") its diameter is 1.9 mm (0.075").

== Distribution ==
The holotype of this marine species was found off Sheffield Beach, South Africa.
