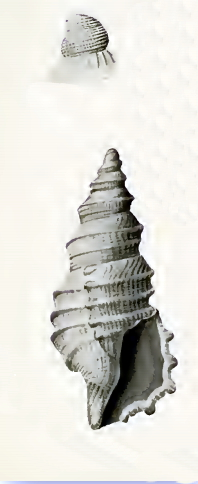
- Shell and protoconch of Eucyclotoma tricarinata

Scientific classification
- Kingdom: Animalia
- Phylum: Mollusca
- Class: Gastropoda
- Subclass: Caenogastropoda
- Order: Neogastropoda
- Superfamily: Conoidea
- Family: Raphitomidae
- Genus: Eucyclotoma
- Species: E. tricarinata

Binomial name
- Eucyclotoma tricarinata (Kiener, 1840)

Synonyms
- Eucyclotoma nobilis Hedley, C., 1922; Pleurotoma tricarinata Kiener, 1840 (not Reeve, 1843)

= Eucyclotoma tricarinata =

Species of gastropod

Eucyclotoma tricarinata is a species of sea snail, a marine gastropod mollusk in the family Raphitomidae.

== Description ==
The length of the shell attains 16 mm, its diameter 7 mm.

The shell is large for the genus. It is lanceolate and rather solid. The colour is crystalline white, splashed irregularly with orange buff. The protoconch is buff. Besides a two-whorled mucronate protoconch there are about seven whorls which wind obliquely and are girt with solid projecting keels. The turreted spire is a little longer than the body whorl.

Sculpture: On the body whorl are four nearly equal girdles. The second and fourth diminish as they ascend, and vanish in a thread two whorls above. The keel forming the basal angle just emerges above the suture on the upper whorls. Close set perpendicular riblets bead the keels at the point of intersection, and their interstices are again traversed by smaller spiral threads. On the snout are half-a-dozen spirals. One specimen has a perfect varix half a whorl behind the aperture. The nucleus has close spiral threads reticulated by finer radials.

Aperture : the outer lip is flared, its edge dentate by the girdle ends, and roughened by intermediate wrinkles. The sinus is subsutural, ovate and contracted at the entrance. The siphonal canal is short and bent. The columella is excavate above and twisted below. The inner lip is represented by a thin film of callus.

== Distribution ==
This marine species occurs off Taiwan, Japan, the Philippines, Fiji, Queensland, Australia.
