= Asthenotoma meneghinii =

Scientific classification
- Kingdom: Animalia
- Phylum: Mollusca
- Class: Gastropoda
- Subclass: Caenogastropoda
- Order: Neogastropoda
- Superfamily: Conoidea
- Family: Borsoniidae
- Genus: †Asthenotoma
- Species: †A. meneghinii

Binomial name
- †Asthenotoma meneghinii (Mayer, 1868)

Synonyms
- † Pleurotoma meneghinii Mayer, 1868 (original combination)

Extinct species of gastropod

Asthenotoma meneghinii is an extinct species of sea snail, a marine gastropod mollusk in the family Borsoniidae.

== Distribution ==
This extinct marine species occurs in the Tortonian strata of the Upper Miocene near Sassuolo in the Northern Apennines, Italy
