= Nepotilla diaphana =

Scientific classification
- Kingdom: Animalia
- Phylum: Mollusca
- Class: Gastropoda
- Subclass: Caenogastropoda
- Order: Neogastropoda
- Superfamily: Conoidea
- Family: Raphitomidae
- Genus: Nepotilla
- Species: N. diaphana

Binomial name
- Nepotilla diaphana May, 1920

Species of gastropod

Nepotilla diaphana, common name the transparent false-turrid, is a species of sea snail, a marine gastropod mollusk in the family Raphitomidae.

== Distribution and habitat ==
This species exhibits a Indo-Pacific distribution, with documented occurrences in:

- Depth range: 50–400 m
- Substrate preference: Sandy-muddy bottoms near coral reef systems
- Locations: Andaman Sea, Bay of Bengal, and South China Sea

== Description ==
The length of the shell attains 4.5 mm.

== Distribution ==
This marine species is endemic to Australia and occurs off Tasmania.
