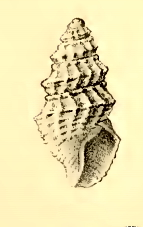
- Original image of Taranis rhytismeis

Scientific classification
- Kingdom: Animalia
- Phylum: Mollusca
- Class: Gastropoda
- Subclass: Caenogastropoda
- Order: Neogastropoda
- Superfamily: Conoidea
- Family: Raphitomidae
- Genus: Taranis
- Species: T. rhytismeis

Binomial name
- Taranis rhytismeis (Melvill, 1910)

Synonyms
- Pleurotomella rhytismeis Melvill, 1910

= Taranis rhytismeis =

Species of gastropod

Taranis rhytismeis is a species of sea snail, a marine gastropod mollusk in the family Raphitomidae.

== Description ==
The length of the shell attains 3 mm, its diameter 1.5 mm.

(Original description in Latin) The shell is very small, white, and compact, with a short fusiform shape. It consists of six whorls, with the two apical whorls being smooth and bulbous, while the remaining whorls are deeply impressed at the sutures and sharply angled at the midpoint. The shell is adorned with oblique ribs and pronounced spiral ridges. The body whorl is sharply angled at the periphery and features nine spiral ridges extending toward the base. The aperture is ovate, with the outer lip angled at the midpoint, and the columella is nearly straight.

The wrinkled sculpture and strong median peripheral angulation distinguish this small white species. Only a specimen or two have been found in 1910.

== Distribution ==
This marine species occurs in the Gulf of Oman.
