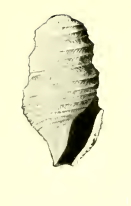
- Original image of a shell of Taranis panope

Scientific classification
- Kingdom: Animalia
- Phylum: Mollusca
- Class: Gastropoda
- Subclass: Caenogastropoda
- Order: Neogastropoda
- Superfamily: Conoidea
- Family: Raphitomidae
- Genus: Taranis
- Species: T. panope

Binomial name
- Taranis panope Dall, 1919

= Taranis panope =

Species of gastropod

Taranis panope is a species of sea snail, a marine gastropod mollusk in the family Raphitomidae.

== Description ==
The length of the shell attains 4.5 mm, its diameter 2.3 mm.

(Original description) The small shell contains about six whorls including the blunt (defective) protoconch. They are white with a pale olivaceous periostracum, short and stumpy. The earlier whorls show two strong peripheral keels and a thread upon which the suture is laid. The body whorl shows a cord at the suture and on the other side of the anal fasciole about five elevated keels with subequal interspaces, more adjacent on the base with about as many more smaller and closer threads on the anterior region. The suture is appressed and obscure. The anal fasciole is concave, not spirally striated The axial sculpture consists of rather close sharp striae which cut the spirals. The aperture is narrow. The anal sulcus is deep and rounded. The outer lip is greatly produced, thin and smooth within. The inner lip shows a wash of callus. The siphonal canal is distinct but very short.

== Distribution ==
This marine species occurs off Ecuador.
