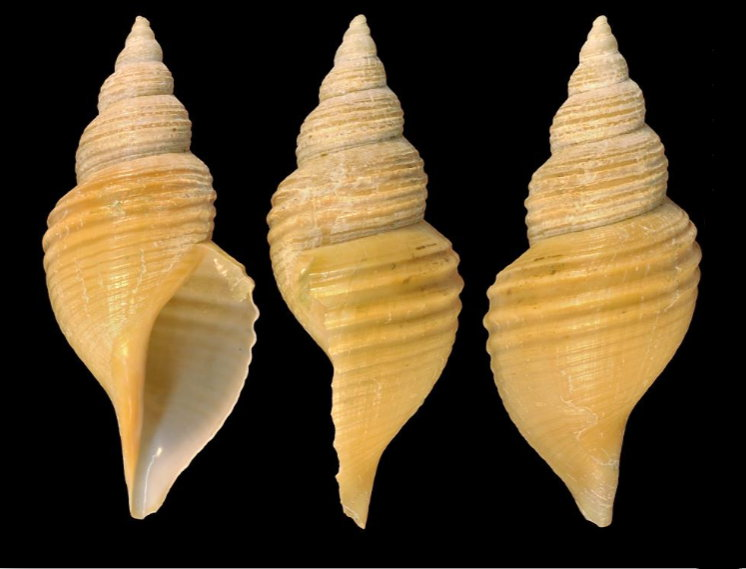
- Shell of Eucyclotoma cingulata (holotype at the Smithsonian Institution)

Scientific classification
- Kingdom: Animalia
- Phylum: Mollusca
- Class: Gastropoda
- Subclass: Caenogastropoda
- Order: Neogastropoda
- Superfamily: Conoidea
- Family: Raphitomidae
- Genus: Eucyclotoma
- Species: E. cingulata

Binomial name
- Eucyclotoma cingulata (Dall, 1890)

Synonyms
- Pleurotomella cingulata Dall, 1890

= Eucyclotoma cingulata =

Species of gastropod

Eucyclotoma cingulata is a species of sea snail, a marine gastropod mollusk in the family Raphitomidae.

== Description ==
(Original description) The large, fusiform shell is rich reddish brown, deepest on the columella, with a closely adherent, very thin, polished epidermis. It contains seven whorls, without the protoconch, which is lost in the specimen, while the outer coat of the apical whorls is much eroded. The whorls are full and rounded. The suture is distinct, not appressed or channeled. The transverse sculpture consists only of fine inconspicuous lines of growth. The spiral sculpture consists of two sorts: first, a fine, sharp, slightly irregular striation, which covers the whole surface; secondly, of revolving elevated cinguli (raised spiral lines), of which three on the periphery are more widely and deeply separated and more elevated than the others. These three have interspaces equal to or wider than themselves. On the body whorl in front of the periphery the cinguli are flat-topped little elevated wide bands with narrower interspaces. This sculpture becomes obscure toward the siphonal canal. Above the periphery is one well-marked cingulum slightly turreting the whorl which inclines from it to the suture in a flattened manner. The aperture is pointed in front, wider behind. The columella is simple, perfectly straight, anteriorly attenuated. The body and the columella show a thin dark brown glaze. The outer lip is very thin, sharp, crenulated by the outside sculpture, which also grooves the interior. The notch is shallow and wide. The fasciole is hardly visible. The siphonal canal is short, wide, hardly differentiated, straight.

== Distribution ==
E. cingulata can be found in Atlantic waters, ranging from the Bahamas south to Brazil.
