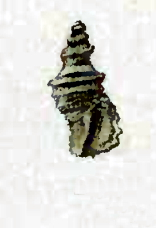
- Shell of Eucyclotoma exilis

Scientific classification
- Kingdom: Animalia
- Phylum: Mollusca
- Class: Gastropoda
- Subclass: Caenogastropoda
- Order: Neogastropoda
- Superfamily: Conoidea
- Family: Raphitomidae
- Genus: Eucyclotoma
- Species: E. exilis

Binomial name
- Eucyclotoma exilis (Dunker, 1871)

Synonyms
- Clathurella pulcherrima H. Adams, 1871; Defrancia tricarinata (Reeve, 1843); Eucyclotoma pulcherrima Adams, 1871 : Eucyclotoma tricarinata Reeve, 1843; Pleurotoma tricarinata Reeve, 1843 (not Kiener, 1840); Pseudodaphnella (Eucyclotoma) tricarinata (Reeve, 1843); Purpura (Polytropa) exilis Dunker, 1871

= Eucyclotoma exilis =

Species of gastropod

Eucyclotoma exilis is a species of sea snail, a marine gastropod mollusk in the family Raphitomidae.

== Description ==
The length of the shell attains 12 mm.

The white shell is finely decussated by raised striae. The body whorl shows three keels, the upper ones are one-keeled.

== Distribution ==
This marine species occurs off the Philippines, Samoa and Queensland, Australia
