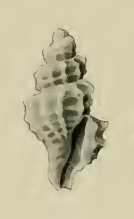
- Original image of a shell of Nepotilla tropicalis

Scientific classification
- Kingdom: Animalia
- Phylum: Mollusca
- Class: Gastropoda
- Subclass: Caenogastropoda
- Order: Neogastropoda
- Superfamily: Conoidea
- Family: Raphitomidae
- Genus: Nepotilla
- Species: N. tropicalis

Binomial name
- Nepotilla tropicalis Hedley, 1922

Synonyms
- Daphnella excavata Hedley, 1907: not Gatliff, 1906

= Nepotilla tropicalis =

Species of gastropod

Nepotilla tropicalis is a species of sea snail, a marine gastropod mollusk in the family Raphitomidae.

== Description ==
The length of the shell attains 1.55 mm, its diameter 0.85 mm.

The minute shell is subscalar. Its colour is dull white. It contains 4 whorls, of which 1½ form the protoconch. Each whorl spreads in a broad shelf above, and thence narrows anteriorly.

Sculpture:—On the body whorl there are four, and on the earlier two, spiral cords, the topmost running along the angle of the shell. The radials which over-ride these are thin elevated lamellae, commencing at the suture and ending as imbricating scales on the snout. There are sixteen on the body whorl. The outer lip is simple. The sinus is short and subsutural. The siphonal canal is short.

== Distribution ==
This marine species is endemic to Australia and occurs off Queensland.
