= Asthenotoma juvenilis =

Asthenotoma juvenilis Temporal range: Oligocene-Early Miocene

Scientific classification
- Kingdom: Animalia
- Phylum: Mollusca
- Class: Gastropoda
- Subclass: Caenogastropoda
- Order: Neogastropoda
- Superfamily: Conoidea
- Family: Borsoniidae
- Genus: †Asthenotoma
- Species: †A. juvenilis

Binomial name
- †Asthenotoma juvenilis Lozouet, 2015

Extinct species of gastropod

Asthenotoma juvenilis is an extinct species of sea snails, a marine gastropod mollusc in the family Borsoniidae.

== Distribution ==
This extinct marine species occurred in the Oligocene and Lower Miocene of Aquitaine (Southwest France).
