= Taranidaphne dufresnei =

Scientific classification
- Kingdom: Animalia
- Phylum: Mollusca
- Class: Gastropoda
- Subclass: Caenogastropoda
- Order: Neogastropoda
- Superfamily: Conoidea
- Family: Raphitomidae
- Genus: Taranidaphne
- Species: T. dufresnei

Binomial name
- Taranidaphne dufresnei Morassi & Bonfitto, 2001

Species of gastropod

Taranidaphne dufresnei is a species of sea snail, a marine gastropod mollusk in the family Raphitomidae.

== Description ==
The length of the shell attains 8 mm, fusiform-biconic to broadly-biconic in shape, teleoconch with a small to intermediate number of rapidly expanding whorls, apex acute, last whorl large and inflated.

== Distribution ==
This marine species occurs off Yemen and in the Red Sea.
