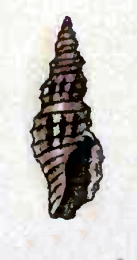
- Shell of Eucyclotoma inquinata

Scientific classification
- Kingdom: Animalia
- Phylum: Mollusca
- Class: Gastropoda
- Subclass: Caenogastropoda
- Order: Neogastropoda
- Superfamily: Conoidea
- Family: Raphitomidae
- Genus: Eucyclotoma
- Species: E. inquinata

Binomial name
- Eucyclotoma inquinata (Reeve, 1845)

Synonyms
- Pleurotoma inquinata Reeve, 1845

= Eucyclotoma inquinata =

Species of gastropod

Eucyclotoma inquinata is a species of sea snail, a marine gastropod mollusk in the family Raphitomidae.

== Description ==
The length of the shell attains 9 mm.

The shell is spirally ridged and closely longitudinally striated. The sinus is deep. The color of the shell is whitish, stained here and there with orange-brown.

== Distribution ==
This marine species occurs off the Philippines.
