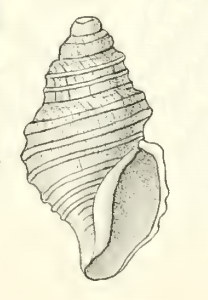
- Original image of a shell of Taranis gratiosa

Scientific classification
- Kingdom: Animalia
- Phylum: Mollusca
- Class: Gastropoda
- Subclass: Caenogastropoda
- Order: Neogastropoda
- Superfamily: Conoidea
- Family: Raphitomidae
- Genus: Taranis
- Species: T. gratiosa

Binomial name
- Taranis gratiosa (Suter, 1908)

Synonyms
- Bathytoma gratiosa Suter, 1908 (original combination); Fenestrosyrinx gratiosa (Suter, 1908)

= Taranis gratiosa =

Species of gastropod

Taranis gratiosa is a species of sea snail, a marine gastropod mollusk in the family Raphitomidae.

== Description ==
The length of the shell attains 3.7 mm, its diameter 2 mm.

The shell is very small. The spire-whorls contain 3 spiral cords, the uppermost feeble . The axial threads are distinctly retrocurrent and flexuous. The suture is distinctly margined.

(Original description) The shell is very small and fusiform, characterized by its white, thin, and turriculate form. It features widely spaced spiral ribs and numerous distinct axial threads that are retrocurrent and flexuous.

Sculpture: Below the smooth protoconch, the spire whorls exhibit a fine thread bordering the lower suture, a second very prominent spiral cord at the angle of the shoulder, and a third equally strong cord situated midway between the shoulder angle and the lower suture. The spaces between these cords are concave and broader than the cords themselves. The body whorl features six spiral cords descending from the shoulder angle toward the base; the upper three are robust, while the lower ones are closer together and less pronounced. The base displays a few indistinct spirals. The axial sculpture consists of fine, nearly equidistant threads that are slightly retrocurrent on the shoulder and become flexuous further down. On the body whorl, these threads become more irregular, with fine growth lines appearing in the interstices.

The shell is whitish in color, with a conical, turriculate spire that is approximately the same height as the aperture. The protoconch is globular and smooth, consisting of about 1¼ whorls. The shell has four whorls, each with a very distinct but slightly sloping shoulder. The base is somewhat contracted, and the suture is superficial and margined. The aperture is subpyriform, angled at the top, with a short and broad siphonal canal below, slightly notched at the base. The outer lip is angled at the top, then convex, tapering below, thin and sharp, and crenulated on the exterior by the spiral ribs. The sinus is rounded, shallow, and positioned just above the carina. The columella is straight and smooth, concave where it meets the parietal wall, and curves to the left towards the siphonal canal. The inner lip is thin and narrow, extending over the faintly convex parietal wall, tapering to a fine point at the base. The operculum is unknown.

== Distribution ==
This marine species is endemic to New Zealand and occurs off Stewart Island to Dusky Sound and Fiordland.
