= Taranis aliena =

Taranis aliena Temporal range: Miocene-Pliocene

Scientific classification
- Kingdom: Animalia
- Phylum: Mollusca
- Class: Gastropoda
- Subclass: Caenogastropoda
- Order: Neogastropoda
- Superfamily: Conoidea
- Family: Raphitomidae
- Genus: Taranis
- Species: †T. aliena

Binomial name
- †Taranis aliena (Marwick, 1965)

Synonyms
- † Awateria (Mioawateria) aliena Marwick, 1965 (original combination)

Extinct species of gastropod

Taranis aliena is an extinct species of sea snail, a marine gastropod mollusk in the family Raphitomidae.

== Distribution ==
This extinct marine species was found in Upper Cenozoic strata of Wairoa District, Hawke's Bay, New Zealand
