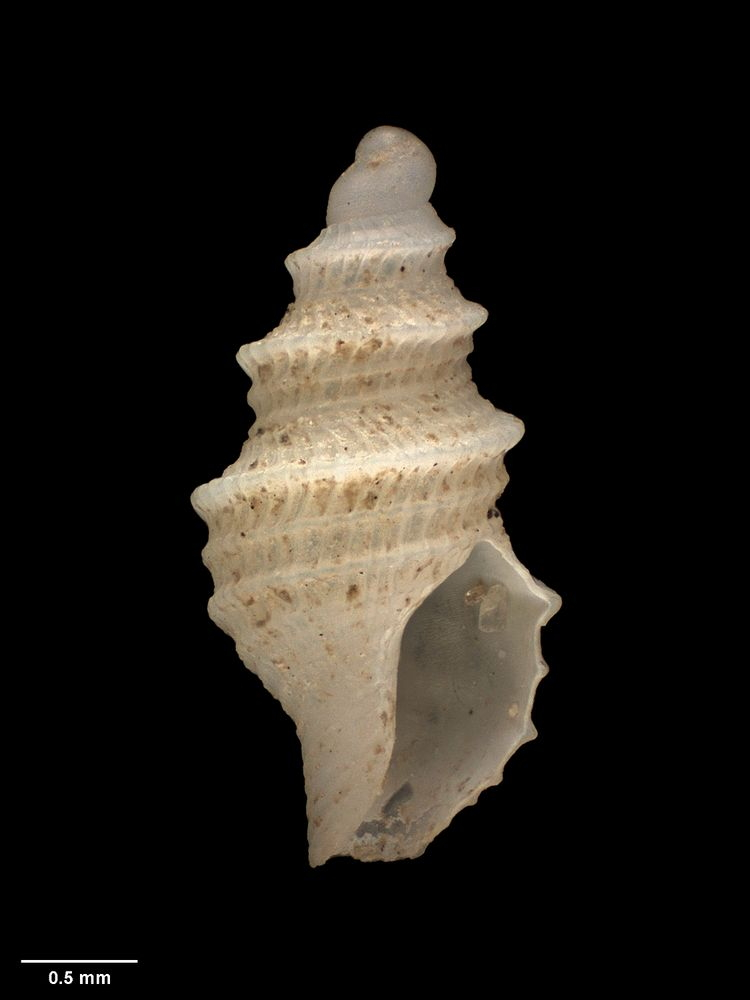
- shell of Taranis nexilis bicarinata (specimen at the Museum of New Zealand)

Scientific classification
- Kingdom: Animalia
- Phylum: Mollusca
- Class: Gastropoda
- Subclass: Caenogastropoda
- Order: Neogastropoda
- Superfamily: Conoidea
- Family: Raphitomidae
- Genus: Taranis
- Species: T. nexilis

Binomial name
- Taranis nexilis (Hutton, 1885)

Synonyms
- Clathurella nexilis Hutton, 1885 (original combination); Fenestrosyrinx nexilis (Hutton, 1885); †Taranis nexilis nexilis (Hutton, 1885) · accepted, alternate representation; Turris (Hemipleurotoma) nexilis Hutton, 1885; Turris nexilis Hutton, 1885 (original combination)

= Taranis nexilis =

Species of gastropod

Taranis nexilis is a species of sea snail, a marine gastropod mollusk in the family Raphitomidae.

Subspecies

- Taranis nexilis bicarinata (Suter, 1915)
- Taranis nexilis recens (C. A. Fleming, 1948

== Description ==
The length of the shell attains 2 mm.

(Original description) The minute, fusiform shell is cancellated. It contains six whorls with two polished whorls in the protoconch. The spire-whorls show a prominent spiral keel, crossed by rather oblique and rather distant spiral threads, forming an obtuse angle on the keel. The suture is margined. The body whorl contains 8 or 9 spiral ribs, the first and third larger than the others. The others after the sixth come very close together on the siphonal canal. These are crossed by rather distant longitudinal lines which form a very obtuse angle on the first spiral rib or keel. The aperture is less than half the length of the shell, rather constricted and angled behind. The columella is straight, produced into a short canal.

== Distribution ==
This marine species occurs off New Zealand and the Philippines.
