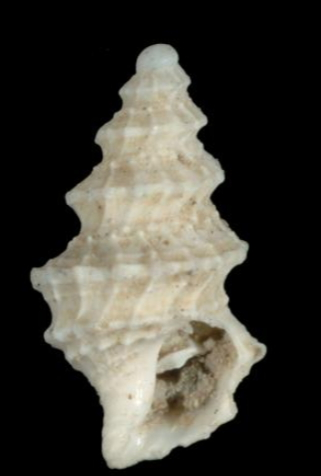
- Shell of Taranis percarinata (holotype at the Smithsonian Institution)

Scientific classification
- Kingdom: Animalia
- Phylum: Mollusca
- Class: Gastropoda
- Subclass: Caenogastropoda
- Order: Neogastropoda
- Superfamily: Conoidea
- Family: Raphitomidae
- Genus: Taranis
- Species: T. percarinata

Binomial name
- Taranis percarinata Powell, 1967

= Taranis percarinata =

Species of gastropod

Taranis percarinata is a species of sea snail, a marine gastropod mollusk in the family Raphitomidae.

== Description ==
The length of the shell attains 2.2 mm.

== Distribution ==
This marine species was found off Palawan Island, the Philippines at a depth of 7 m.
