= Taranis borealis =

Scientific classification
- Kingdom: Animalia
- Phylum: Mollusca
- Class: Gastropoda
- Subclass: Caenogastropoda
- Order: Neogastropoda
- Superfamily: Conoidea
- Family: Raphitomidae
- Genus: Taranis
- Species: T. borealis

Binomial name
- Taranis borealis Bouchet & Warén, 1980

Synonyms
- Taranis parvulum Locard, 1897

Species of gastropod

Taranis borealis is a species of sea snail, a marine gastropod mollusc in the family Raphitomidae. It was first described by Philippe Bouchet and Anders Warén in their revision of North Atlantic Turridae.

== Description ==
The shell is small, thin and elongate, measuring between 2 mm and 3.5 mm in length. The sculpture consists of fine spiral striae and weak axial ribs. The aperture is narrow, ending in a short siphonal canal. The protoconch is multispiral, indicating planktotrophic larval development.

== Distribution ==
This marine species occurs in both temperate North Atlantic and eastern Atlantic waters. It has been recorded off Norway, Sweden, and the Bay of Biscay, and farther south off Senegal. Specimens are usually collected from the continental shelf and slope at depths ranging from about 200 m to more than 1000 m.

== See also ==
- Taranis (gastropod)
- Raphitomidae
