= Nepotilla serrata =

Scientific classification
- Kingdom: Animalia
- Phylum: Mollusca
- Class: Gastropoda
- Subclass: Caenogastropoda
- Order: Neogastropoda
- Superfamily: Conoidea
- Family: Raphitomidae
- Genus: Nepotilla
- Species: N. serrata

Binomial name
- Nepotilla serrata Laseron, 1954

Species of gastropod

Nepotilla serrata is a species of sea snail, a marine gastropod mollusk in the family Raphitomidae.

== Distribution ==
This marine species is endemic to Australia and occurs off New South Wales.
