= Nepotilla powelli =

Scientific classification
- Kingdom: Animalia
- Phylum: Mollusca
- Class: Gastropoda
- Subclass: Caenogastropoda
- Order: Neogastropoda
- Superfamily: Conoidea
- Family: Raphitomidae
- Genus: Nepotilla
- Species: N. powelli

Binomial name
- Nepotilla powelli Dell, 1956

Species of gastropod

Nepotilla powelli is a species of sea snail, a marine gastropod mollusk in the family Raphitomidae.

== Description ==
The length of the shell attains 3 mm, its diameter 1.3 mm.

== Distribution ==
This marine species is endemic to New Zealand and occurs off Chatham Islands.
