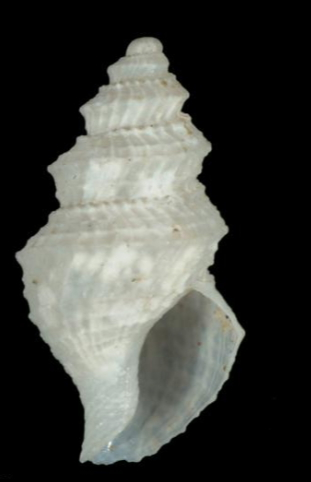
- Shell of Taranis ticaonica (specimen at the Smithsonian Institution)

Scientific classification
- Kingdom: Animalia
- Phylum: Mollusca
- Class: Gastropoda
- Subclass: Caenogastropoda
- Order: Neogastropoda
- Superfamily: Conoidea
- Family: Raphitomidae
- Genus: Taranis
- Species: T. ticaonica

Binomial name
- Taranis ticaonica Powell, 1967

= Taranis ticaonica =

Species of gastropod

Taranis ticaonica is a species of sea snail, a marine gastropod mollusk in the family Raphitomidae.

== Description ==
The length of the shell attains 2.5 mm.

== Distribution ==
This marine species occurs off the Philippines and the Central-Western Pacific. They usually live in demersal, tropical areas.
