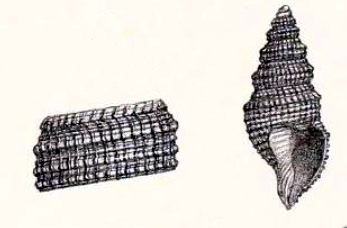
- Original image of a shell of Taranidaphne beblammena

Scientific classification
- Kingdom: Animalia
- Phylum: Mollusca
- Class: Gastropoda
- Subclass: Caenogastropoda
- Order: Neogastropoda
- Superfamily: Conoidea
- Family: Raphitomidae
- Genus: Taranidaphne
- Species: T. beblammena

Binomial name
- Taranidaphne beblammena (Sturany, 1903)

Synonyms
- Pleurotoma beblammena Sturany, 1903 (original combination); Turris beblammena (Sturany, 1903)

= Taranidaphne beblammena =

Species of gastropod

Taranidaphne beblammena is a species of sea snail, a marine gastropod mollusk in the family Raphitomidae.

== Description ==
The length of the shell attains 9.7 mm, and its diameter is 3.6 mm. Although the overall texture of the shell appears smooth, the structure is described as "a fine cancellated sculpture."

== Distribution ==
This marine species occurs in the Red Sea.
