= Nepotilla excavata =

Scientific classification
- Kingdom: Animalia
- Phylum: Mollusca
- Class: Gastropoda
- Subclass: Caenogastropoda
- Order: Neogastropoda
- Superfamily: Conoidea
- Family: Raphitomidae
- Genus: Nepotilla
- Species: N. excavata

Binomial name
- Nepotilla excavata (Gatliff, 1906)

Synonyms
- Daphnella excavata Gatliff, 1906

Species of mollusc

Nepotilla excavata is a species of sea snail, a marine gastropod mollusk in the family Raphitomidae.

== Description ==
The length of the shell varies between 1.5 mm and 2 mm and is pale brownish-yellow.

== Distribution ==
This marine species is endemic to Australia and occurs off Tasmania, New South Wales, Victoria and South Australia.
