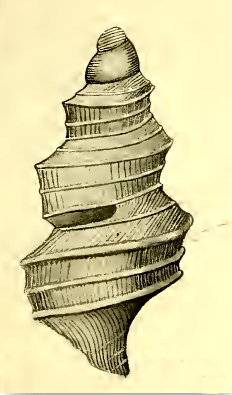
- Original image of a shell of Nepotilla bathentoma

Scientific classification
- Kingdom: Animalia
- Phylum: Mollusca
- Class: Gastropoda
- Subclass: Caenogastropoda
- Order: Neogastropoda
- Superfamily: Conoidea
- Family: Raphitomidae
- Genus: Nepotilla
- Species: N. bathentoma

Binomial name
- Nepotilla bathentoma (Verco, 1909)

Synonyms
- Daphnella bathentoma Verco, 1909; Taranis (Nepotilla) bathentoma Wenz, 1943

= Nepotilla bathentoma =

Species of gastropod

Nepotilla bathentoma is a species of sea snail, a marine gastropod mollusk in the family Raphitomidae.

== Description ==
The length of the shell attains 2.8 mm, its diameter 1.45 mm.

(Original description) The small, white, thin shell consists of 5 whorls, including the prominent conical protoconch of 2 convex elate whorls, with exserted apex. The whorls of the spire have a corded obtuse angulation, with a slope from the upper suture, somewhat constricted towards the lower. The body whorl shows a second angulation starting from the suture at the aperture. Below this the base is rapidly concavely contracted. The aperture is obliquely oval. The siphonal canal is short. The outer lip is thin, simple and biangulate. There is a deep, narrow sinus at the suture with parallel margins. The outer lip is in profile slightly convex to the front angulation, then concave to the edge of the siphonal canal. The columella is very long, nearly straight. When looked at from the apex the shell is faintly polygonal, with ten angles in a spiral (in a cotype these are produced into transverse sharp tubercles). A single spiral runs between the angulation and the upper suture, and in the body whorl bounds the front of the posterior sinus. Another lies midway between the angulation and the lower suture. In the suture, the second angulation of the body whorl may appear as a sutural cord. This bounds the back of the posterior labral sinus. Concave forward axials run from the suture to the nearest spiral, then become straight and very oblique from this to the first angle, then vertical to the next angle, and are lost on the base. They do not cross the spirals or stand erect.

== Distribution ==
This marine species is endemic to Australia and occurs off New South Wales, South Australia and Tasmania
