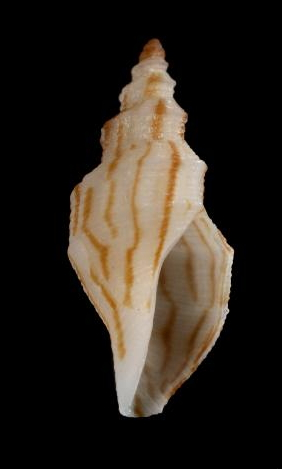
- Eucyclotoma sp., specimen at French National Museum of Natural History (Muséum National d'Histoire Naturelle), Paris

Scientific classification
- Kingdom: Animalia
- Phylum: Mollusca
- Class: Gastropoda
- Subclass: Caenogastropoda
- Order: Neogastropoda
- Superfamily: Conoidea
- Family: Raphitomidae
- Genus: Eucyclotoma
- Species: E. albomacula

Binomial name
- Eucyclotoma albomacula Kay, 1979

= Eucyclotoma albomacula =

Species of sea snail

Eucyclotoma albomacula is a species of sea snail, a marine gastropod mollusk in the family Raphitomidae. It was first described by E. Alison Kay in 1979 and is distinguished by a single spiral keel on each whorl with axial white stripes; the species name (albomacula) is derived from the Latin albo (white) and macula (speck or spot).

== Description ==
The shell varies greatly in length, with specimens ranging in size from 2 mm to 8 mm (0.08 - 0.31 inches). The holotype has a diameter of 2 mm (0.08 inches) and a length of about 7.75 mm (0.3 inches). The shell is tall-spired, thin, with a sloping spiral keel on each whorl. The shell is described as glossy, chestnut brown with three axial streaks of white colour. Its spire consists of a protoconch of two and a half whorls, a teleoconch of c. nine whorls, and an indistinct suture marked by a spiral head and a linear spiral of white and brown. It has a widely oval aperture about one-fifth the total length of the shell, a thin outer lip with protrusions of the spiral keels.

== Distribution ==
Eucyclotoma albomacula are rare, found at mesophotic depths between 59 m to 195 m (194 - 640 ft). They are thought to be endemic to the Hawaiian Islands. The holotype was collected at a depth of 60 m (197 ft), in Kepuhi Point, O'ahu. Specimens have been collected from Lāna'i, Ni'ihau, French Frigate Shoals, Laysan, Salmon Bank, Pearl and Hermes Atoll, Midway Atoll, and Kure Atoll.

Specimens at Bernice P. Bishop Museum	Shell length (mm)	Site collected	Depth range
1 (holotype specimen)	7.75	Kepuhi Point, O’ahi	60 m
3 specimens	3.9 - 6.0	Lāna‘i	75 m - 91 m
1 specimen	4.6	Ni‘ihau	59 m
1 specimen	7.0	French Frigate Shoals	85 m
1 specimen	2.5	Laysan	64 m
2 specimens, 1 partial shell	2.7 - 3.5	Salmon Bank	82 m (partial shell found at 91 m)
12 specimens, 1 partial shell	2.2 - 3.0	Pearl and Hermes Atoll	55 m - 98 m (partial shell found at 85 m)
7 specimens, 1 partial shell	2.2 - 5.7	Midway Atoll	59 m - 65 m (partial shell found at 84 m)
4 specimens	2.0 - 6.8	Kure Atoll	88 m - 94 m

This table does not represent every specimen of Eucyclotoma albomacula collected, merely specimens in possession of the Bernice P. Bishop Museum, Honolulu, Hawaii.

== See also ==
- Eucyclotoma
- Raphitomidae
- Tritonoturris
