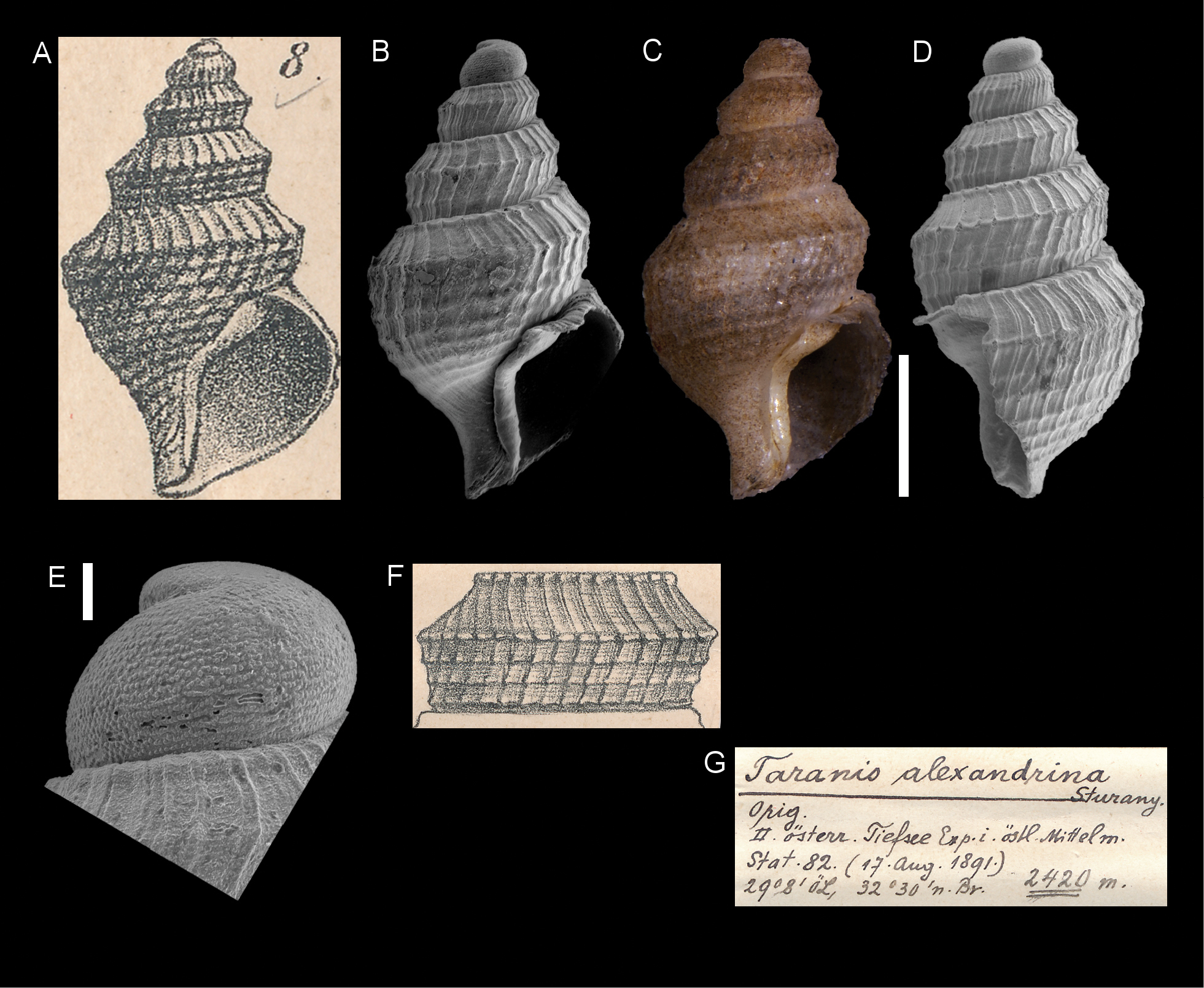
- Shell of Taranis moerchii

Scientific classification
- Kingdom: Animalia
- Phylum: Mollusca
- Class: Gastropoda
- Subclass: Caenogastropoda
- Order: Neogastropoda
- Superfamily: Conoidea
- Family: Raphitomidae
- Genus: Taranis
- Species: T. moerchii

Binomial name
- Taranis moerchii (Malm, 1861)

Synonyms
- Trophon moerchii Malm, 1861 (basionym); Bela demersa Tiberi, 1868; Mangilia (Pleurotomella) tornata (Verrill, 1884); † Pleurotoma cirratum Brugnone, 1862; Taranis alexandrina Sturany, 1896; Taranis cirrata (Brugnone, 1862); Taranis cirrata curta Locard, 1897 -; Taranis cirrata simplex Locard, 1897; Taranis cirrata spinulosa Locard, 1897; Taranis cirrata tenuis Locard, 1897; Taranis demersa Tiberi, 1868; Taranis moerchi [sic] (incorrect subsequent spelling); Taranis moerchii var. tornata Verrill, 1884

= Taranis moerchii =

Species of gastropod

Taranis moerchii is a species of sea snail in the family Raphitomidae. It is infaunal burrower that occurs over a wide range of depths.

== Description ==
The shell can reach 5 mm × 5.5 mm (0.20 in × 0.22 in).

Description as Taranis moerchii var. tornata:

The two specimens from station 2077, in 1255 fathoms, are somewhat stouter than those previously obtained, and have the principal carina, forming the shoulder, larger and more prominent than usual, but it bears only very minute tubercles, corresponding to the very fine and close riblets which cross the wide and abruptly sloping subsutural band obliquely, and are about twice as numerous and much finer than in the ordinary variety. On the body whorl there are about six prominent, distant, revolving cinguli below the shoulder, besides some faint ones on the base of the siphonal canal. The space between the uppermost of these and the shoulder-carina is greater than usual. The lines of growth are much finer than in the ordinary form and do not take the appearance of riblets on the body whorl, nor do they render the cinguli nodulous. The suture is sharply impressed, and the raised revolving line usually present just below the suture is absent. This form, therefore, is characterized by the relative predominance of the spiral sculpture over the transverse, and by the absence of distinct nodules at the crossing of the two systems of lines.

== Distribution ==
This marine species occurs in the Atlantic Ocean and in the Mediterranean Sea (where it is not rare). It may be restricted to reducing environments and cold seeps and is possibly chemosynthetic.
