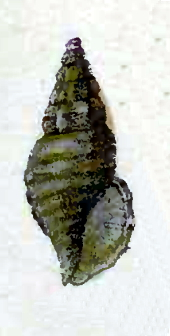
- Shell of Eucyclotoma trivaricosa

Scientific classification
- Kingdom: Animalia
- Phylum: Mollusca
- Class: Gastropoda
- Subclass: Caenogastropoda
- Order: Neogastropoda
- Superfamily: Conoidea
- Family: Raphitomidae
- Genus: Eucyclotoma
- Species: E. trivaricosa

Binomial name
- Eucyclotoma trivaricosa (Martens, 1880)

Synonyms
- Daphnella trivaricosa Martens, 1880; Daphnella trizonata (E. A. Smith, 1882)

= Eucyclotoma trivaricosa =

Species of gastropod

Eucyclotoma trivaricosa is a species of sea snail, a marine gastropod mollusk in the family Raphitomidae.

== Description ==
The size of the mollusks shell reaches up to 15 mm in length and is light yellowish white in color.

The shell shows four or five revolving ridges on the body whorl, with intermediate close revolving striae. There are no longitudinal ribs except on the upper whorls of the spire, subcontinuously three-varicose.

The uppermost whorls are strongly variced, the lower ones usually plain.

== Distribution ==
It was originally found off Mauritius and Réunion; also in the Gulf of Oman.
