= Taranis laevisculpta =

Scientific classification
- Kingdom: Animalia
- Phylum: Mollusca
- Class: Gastropoda
- Subclass: Caenogastropoda
- Order: Neogastropoda
- Superfamily: Conoidea
- Family: Raphitomidae
- Genus: Taranis
- Species: T. laevisculpta

Binomial name
- Taranis laevisculpta Monterosato, 1880

Synonyms
- Tarranis cirrata laevisculpta Monterosato, 1880

Species of gastropod

Taranis laevisculpta is a species of sea snail, a marine gastropod mollusk in the family Raphitomidae.

== Description ==
The length of the shell varies between 3 mm and 7 mm.

(Original description in Italian) It is characterized by its smaller size, descending spire, thicker apex, lack of a keel, and extremely fine sculpture with no protruding elements.

== Distribution ==
This marine species was found off Palermo, Sicily, Italy.
