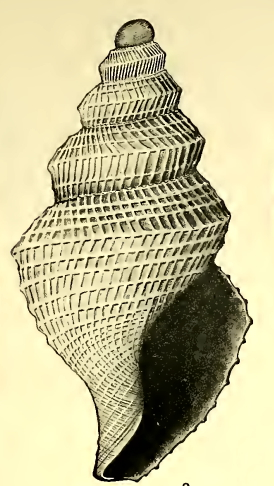
- Original image of a shell of Taranis mayi

Scientific classification
- Kingdom: Animalia
- Phylum: Mollusca
- Class: Gastropoda
- Subclass: Caenogastropoda
- Order: Neogastropoda
- Superfamily: Conoidea
- Family: Raphitomidae
- Genus: Taranis
- Species: T. mayi

Binomial name
- Taranis mayi (Verco, 1909)

Synonyms
- Asperdaphne mayi (Verco, 1909); Daphnella mayi (Verco, 1909); Hemipleurotoma mayi Verco, 1909

= Taranis mayi =

Species of gastropod

Taranis mayi is a species of sea snail, a marine gastropod mollusk in the family Raphitomidae.

== Description ==
The length of the shell attains 4.6 mm, its diameter 2.4 mm.

(Original description) The shell is thin, oval, and white, comprising four whorls in addition to a brown protoconch with two whorls. These whorls are convex and appear smooth to the naked eye, but under the microscope, they reveal very fine spiral lirae and interstitial punctation. The spire whorls are convex, sharply angulate at the middle with a distinct cord, and the base is contracted, forming a moderately long siphonal canal that curves slightly to the left. The sutures are distinct and finely canaliculated. The aperture is obliquely oval, with a thin, simple outer lip that is ridged externally by the spirals. At the angulation, there is an obtuse, shallow, and wide triangular sinus.

Sculpture: From the suture to the angle, the surface slopes back, then bends forward at an obtuse angle towards the suture. Above the angle, each whorl features three spiral ribs, with an additional one below it. On the body whorl there are eighteen spirals — subdistant just below the angle and becoming more crowded toward the siphonal canal. Very fine axial ribs, about 42 on the penultimate whorl, run obliquely across the surface.

Variations: One example has only one spiral above its very sharp angle, namely, a bold cord just below the suture, making this more channelled and only one below the angle just above the suture in the second and third whorls, and seven in the body whorl.

== Distribution ==
This marine species is endemic to Australia and occurs off South Australia.
