= Zenepos totolirata =

Scientific classification
- Kingdom: Animalia
- Phylum: Mollusca
- Class: Gastropoda
- Subclass: Caenogastropoda
- Order: Neogastropoda
- Superfamily: Conoidea
- Family: Raphitomidae
- Genus: Zenepos
- Species: Z. totolirata

Binomial name
- Zenepos totolirata (Suter, 1908)

Synonyms
- Daphnella totolirata Suter, 1908

Species of gastropod

Zenepos totolirata is a species of sea snail, a marine gastropod mollusk in the family Raphitomidae.

== Description ==
The length of the shell attains 3.4 mm, its diameter is 1.4 mm.

(Original description) The minute shell is narrowly fusiform, thin, semitransparent and spirally lirate.

Sculpture : The protoconch is microscopically finely spirally striate, the succeeding whorls have 3 and the body whorl has 10 to 12 equidistant fine spiral lirae. The interstices are smooth and slightly broader than the threads.

The colour of the shell is white.

The spire is narrowly conical, measuring about 1½ times the height of the aperture. The protoconch consists of 1½ convex whorls, the nucleus is narrowly rounded and oblique. There are 4 to 5 subsequent whorls, regularly increasing, lightly convex and somewhat flattened below the suture. The base of the shell is slightly contracted. The suture is not much impressed. The aperture is high and narrow, angled above, with a very short broad and truncated siphonal canal below. The outer lip is convex, straightened below the suture, with a very shallow broad sinus at the suture. It is smooth inside, crenated on the outside by spiral sculpture, thin and sharp. The columella is vertical, straight, and lightly excavated toward the flat parietal wall. The inner lip is very thin, narrow and smooth.

== Distribution ==
This marine species is endemic to New Zealand and occurs off South Island.
