= Taranis imporcata =

Scientific classification
- Kingdom: Animalia
- Phylum: Mollusca
- Class: Gastropoda
- Subclass: Caenogastropoda
- Order: Neogastropoda
- Superfamily: Conoidea
- Family: Raphitomidae
- Genus: Taranis
- Species: T. imporcata

Binomial name
- Taranis imporcata (Dell, 1962)

Synonyms
- Fenestrosyrinx imporcata Dell, 1962

Species of gastropod

Taranis imporcata is a deep-sea species of sea snail, a marine gastropod mollusk in the family Raphitomidae.

== Description ==
The length of the shell attains 6 mm, its diameter 3 mm.

== Distribution ==
This marine species is endemic to New Zealand and occurs off Taiaroa Heads, eastern Otago at a depth of 550 metres.
