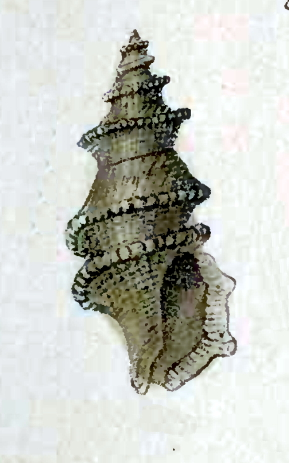
- Shell of Eucyclotoma bicarinata

Scientific classification
- Kingdom: Animalia
- Phylum: Mollusca
- Class: Gastropoda
- Subclass: Caenogastropoda
- Order: Neogastropoda
- Superfamily: Conoidea
- Family: Raphitomidae
- Genus: Eucyclotoma
- Species: E. bicarinata

Binomial name
- Eucyclotoma bicarinata (Pease, 1863)

Synonyms
- Clathurella bicarinata Pease, 1863; Daphnella bicarinata Pease, 1862

= Eucyclotoma bicarinata =

Species of gastropod

Eucyclotoma bicarinata is a species of sea snail, a marine gastropod mollusk in the family Raphitomidae.

== Description ==
The length of the shell is 10 mm (0.39 in), its diameter 5 mm (0.20 in).

The white, turreted shell is elongate. It contains six whorls, clathrated throughout by longitudinal and transverse elevated striae. The body whorl is ornamented with two and the spire with one keel. The keels are very prominent, crenulated on their edge. The whorls descend obliquely from the keels to the suture. The middle of the body whorl between the keels is plane and at the sutures slightly angulated. The outer lip is expanded and on its surface radiately ridged. The siphonal canal is twisted, and recurve. The sinus is a very narrow deep slit, terminating in a round hole.

== Distribution ==
This marine species occurs off Kingsmill Island, Polynesia; also off Kiribati; Réunion and the Philippines.
