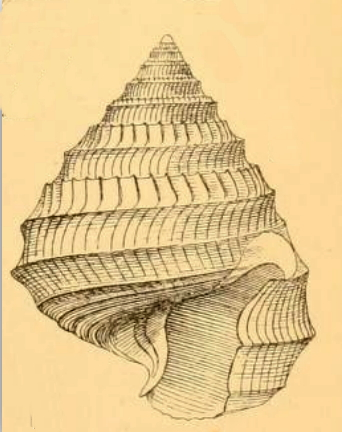
- Shell of Taranis leptalea (holotype)

Scientific classification
- Kingdom: Animalia
- Phylum: Mollusca
- Class: Gastropoda
- Subclass: Caenogastropoda
- Order: Neogastropoda
- Superfamily: Conoidea
- Family: Raphitomidae
- Genus: Taranis
- Species: T. leptalea

Binomial name
- Taranis leptalea (Verrill, 1884)

Synonyms
- Sipho leptaleus Verrill, 1884

= Taranis leptalea =

Species of gastropod

Taranis leptalea is a species of sea snail, a marine gastropod mollusk in the family Raphitomidae.

== Description ==
The length of the shell attains 3.5 mm, its diameter 2 mm.

(Original description) The shell is small, fusiform, and glossy white. It consistings of five whorls that are very convex and slightly keeled and angled at the midpoint on the lower whorls. The suture is well impressed. The spire is elevated, tapering regularly to an acute point. The sculpture features numerous regular, thin, delicate, raised longitudinal ribs that follow a sigmoid curve, with the portion corresponding to the most prominent angle of the whorls strongly receding. Between the ribs, fine, microscopic, wavy spiral lines are present. A distinct internal line is usually visible just below the suture. The aperture is irregularly ovate, rather narrow, and elongated. The outer lip is thin, curving smoothly towards the base of the siphonal canal, which is somewhat lengthened, oblique, and slightly twisted. The columella margin of the siphonal canal forms a sigmoid curve. The protoconch is prominent and rounded, consisting of about 1½ whorls, covered with fine spiral lines.

== Distribution ==
This marine species was found off New England, USA
