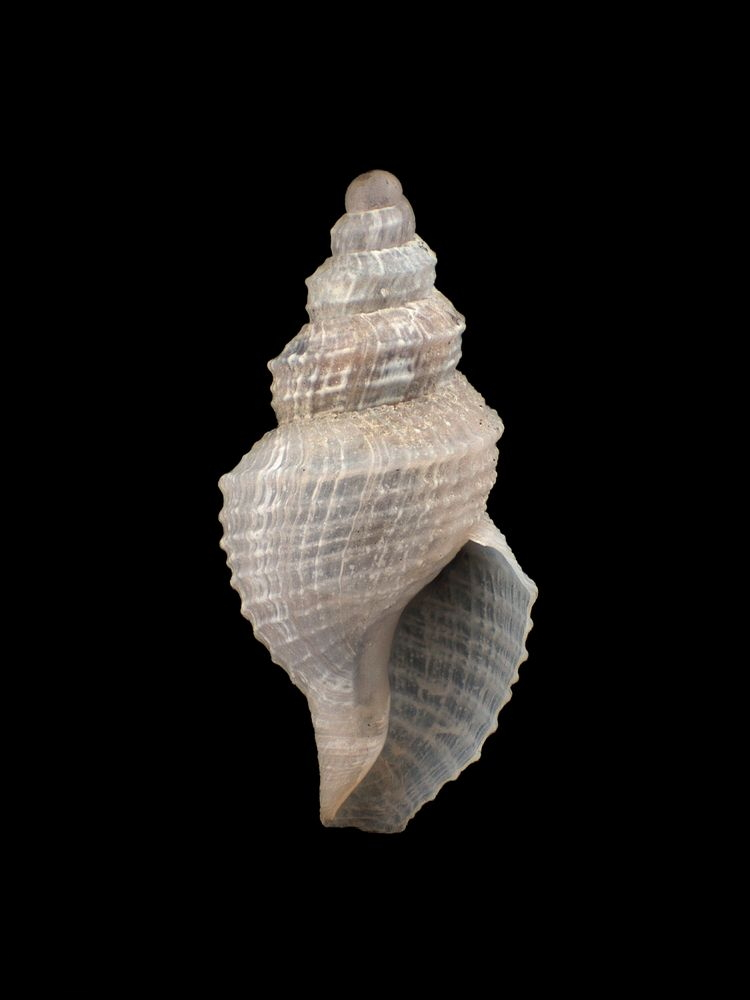
- Shell of Taranis benthicola (holotype in the Museum of New Zealand)

Scientific classification
- Kingdom: Animalia
- Phylum: Mollusca
- Class: Gastropoda
- Subclass: Caenogastropoda
- Order: Neogastropoda
- Superfamily: Conoidea
- Family: Raphitomidae
- Genus: Taranis
- Species: T. benthicola

Binomial name
- Taranis benthicola (Dell, 1956)

Synonyms
- Fenestrosyrinx benthicola Dell, 1956

= Taranis benthicola =

Species of gastropod

Taranis benthicola is a species of sea snail, a marine gastropod mollusk in the family Raphitomidae.

== Description ==
The length of the shell attains 5.5 mm, its diameter is 2.7 mm.

== Distribution ==
This marine species is endemic to New Zealand and occurs off eastern North and South Islands, Fiordland, and Chatham Rise.
