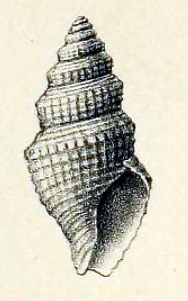
- Original image of a shell of Taranidaphne nereidum

Scientific classification
- Kingdom: Animalia
- Phylum: Mollusca
- Class: Gastropoda
- Subclass: Caenogastropoda
- Order: Neogastropoda
- Superfamily: Conoidea
- Family: Raphitomidae
- Genus: Taranidaphne
- Species: T. nereidum

Binomial name
- Taranidaphne nereidum (Melvill & Standen, 1903)

Synonyms
- Daphnella (Pleurotomella) nereidum Melvill & Standen, 1903

= Taranidaphne nereidum =

Species of gastropod

Taranidaphne nereidum is a species of sea snail, a marine gastropod mollusk in the family Raphitomidae.

== Description ==
The length of the shell attains 7 mm, its diameter 3 mm.

(Original description in Latin) The delicate ovate-cylindrical shell is semi-transparent and has a milky white color. It contains 8-9 whorls of which 2⅓ or 3 whorls in the protoconch. These are pale reddish and rather thinly decussate. The subsequent whorls are angular in the middle part. The suture is slightly impressed. The ribs and the transverse lirae are crystalline. The body whorl is angular above the middle part and with ribs often vanishing on its backside. The aperture is narrow and ovate with a white interior. The outer lip is thin. The siphonal canal is short and slightly recurved.

== Distribution ==
This marine species occurs in the Gulf of Oman
