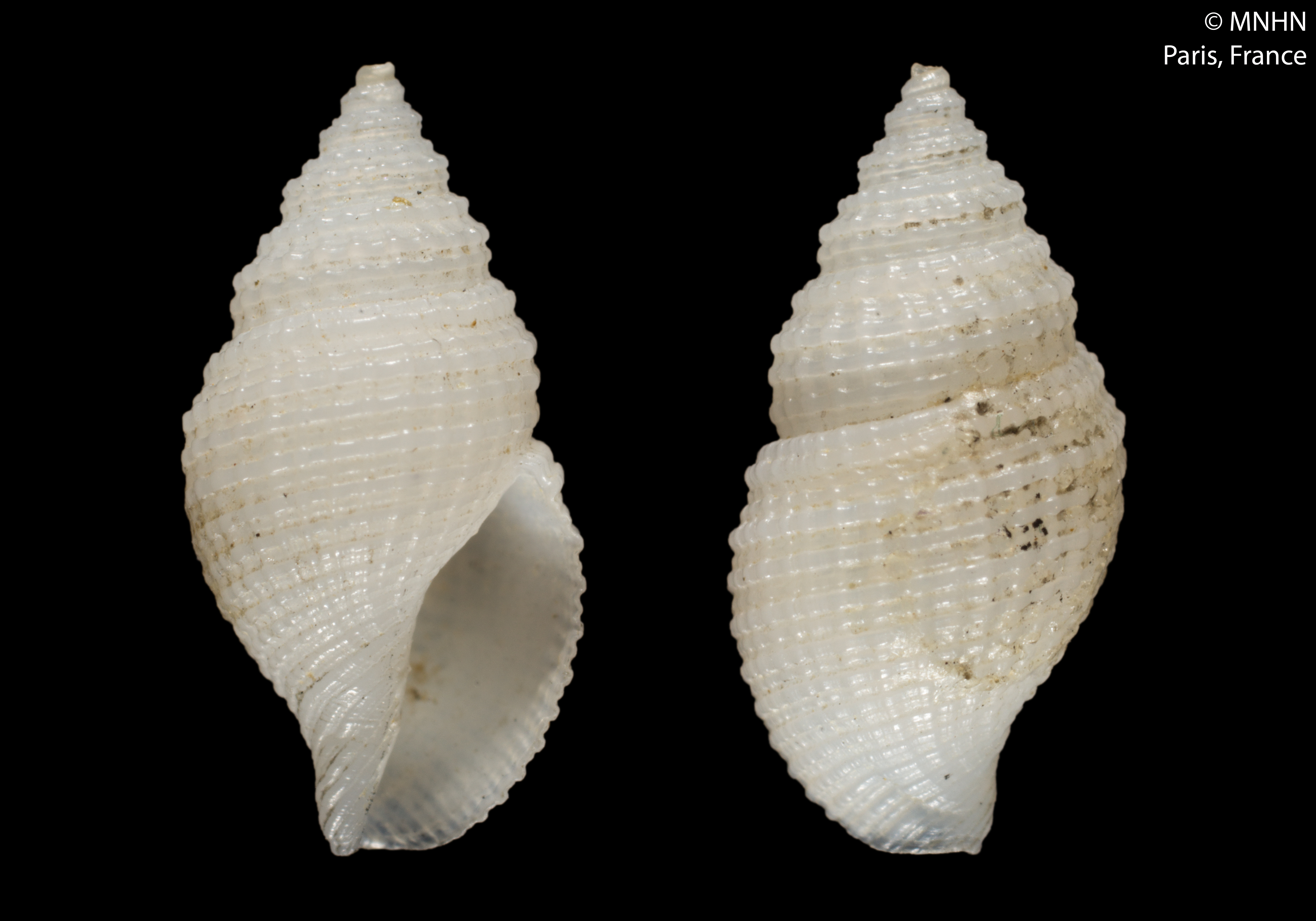
- Shell of Taranidaphne hongkongensis (syntype at MNHN, Paris)

Scientific classification
- Kingdom: Animalia
- Phylum: Mollusca
- Class: Gastropoda
- Subclass: Caenogastropoda
- Order: Neogastropoda
- Superfamily: Conoidea
- Family: Raphitomidae
- Genus: Taranidaphne
- Species: T. hongkongensis

Binomial name
- Taranidaphne hongkongensis (G.B. Sowerby III, 1889)

Synonyms
- Bela erythraea Jousseaume, 1895; Pleurotoma hongkongensis Sowerby III, 1889; Taranis erythraeus (Jousseaume, 1895)

= Taranidaphne hongkongensis =

Species of gastropod

Taranidaphne hongkongensis is a species of sea snail, a marine gastropod mollusk in the family Raphitomidae.

== Description ==
The length of the shell attains 6 mm, its diameter is 3 mm.

== Distribution ==
This marine species occurs in the Red Sea and off Hong Kong.
