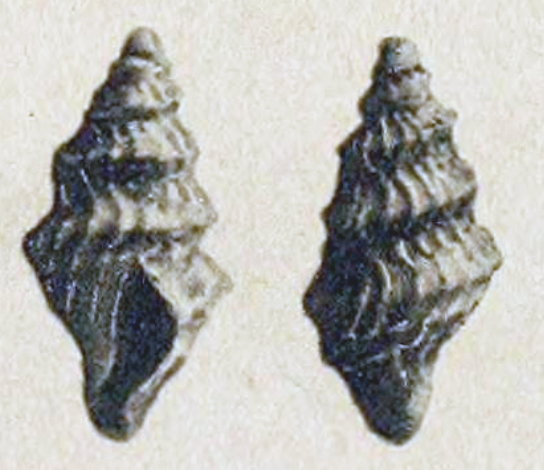
- Shell of † Taranis circumflexa (holotype)

Scientific classification
- Kingdom: Animalia
- Phylum: Mollusca
- Class: Gastropoda
- Subclass: Caenogastropoda
- Order: Neogastropoda
- Superfamily: Conoidea
- Family: Raphitomidae
- Genus: Taranis
- Species: †T. circumflexa

Binomial name
- †Taranis circumflexa (Hornung, 1920)

Synonyms
- † Pleurotoma circumflexa Hornung, 1920 (original combination)

= Taranis circumflexa =

Taranis circumflexa Temporal range: Early Pliocene

Extinct species of gastropod

Taranis circumflexa is an extinct species of sea snail, a marine gastropod mollusk in the family Raphitomidae.

== Description ==
The length of the shell attains 3.5 mm, its diameter 1.5 mm.

(Original description in French) The small shell has a turrited-conical shape with whorls that are keeled at the midpoint. The suture is deep and bordered. The surface is adorned with both axial and spiral ribs. The axial ribs are numerous, closely spaced, irregular, and very oblique, sometimes bifid. They continue onto the keel, forming a wide angle, and extend onto the ridge that borders the suture, giving the keel and ridge a crenulated appearance. The area below the keel is generally devoid of spiral threads, especially on the earlier whorls. However, on the body whorl, a very fine thread may occasionally be seen near the keel. The anterior portion of the body whorl is crossed by three widely spaced threads, with the first being the largest and separated from the keel by a wider space. Small granulations mark where these threads intersect the axial ribs. The aperture is triangular and narrows towards the front. The outer lip is simple and sinuous at the keel angle. The columella is smooth, excavated at the rear, and curves to the right at the entrance of the siphonal canal, which is fairly short and slightly bent to the left at its tip.

== Distribution ==
This extinct marine species was found in Lower Pliocene strata of Liguria, Italy.
