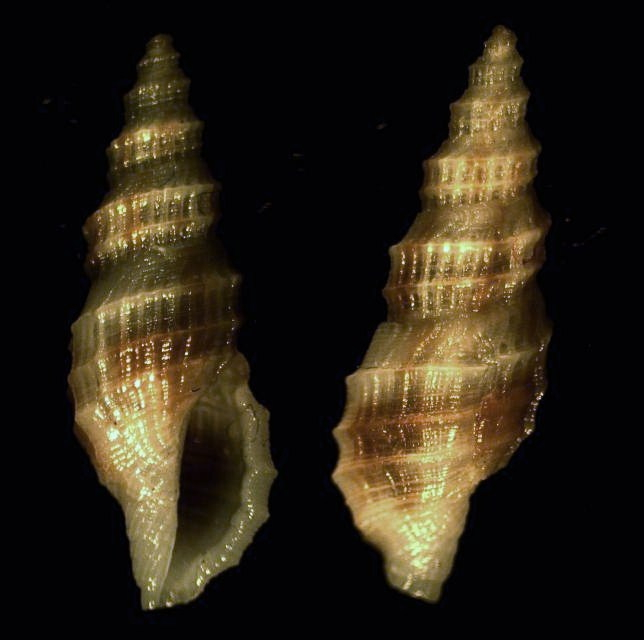
- Shell of Eucyclotoma hindsii

Scientific classification
- Kingdom: Animalia
- Phylum: Mollusca
- Class: Gastropoda
- Subclass: Caenogastropoda
- Order: Neogastropoda
- Superfamily: Conoidea
- Family: Raphitomidae
- Genus: Eucyclotoma
- Species: E. hindsii

Binomial name
- Eucyclotoma hindsii (Reeve, 1843)

Synonyms
- Pleurotoma hindsii Reeve, 1843

= Eucyclotoma hindsii =

Species of gastropod

Eucyclotoma hindsii is a species of sea snail, a marine gastropod mollusk in the family Raphitomidae.

== Description ==
The length of the shell varies between 8 mm and 15 mm.

The white shell is faintly variegated with pale brown. The body whorl shows four distant revolving ridges, the others with two. The shell is delicately cancellated with numerous compressed smaller ribs.

== Distribution ==
This marine species occurs off the Philippines, Japan and the Marianas
