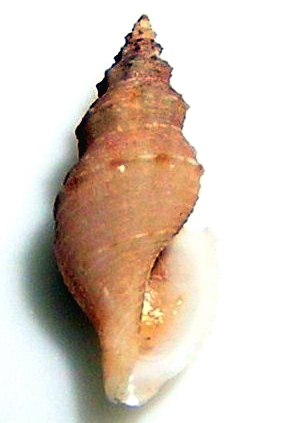
- Shell of Eucyclotoma stegeri

Scientific classification
- Kingdom: Animalia
- Phylum: Mollusca
- Class: Gastropoda
- Subclass: Caenogastropoda
- Order: Neogastropoda
- Superfamily: Conoidea
- Family: Raphitomidae
- Genus: Eucyclotoma
- Species: E. stegeri

Binomial name
- Eucyclotoma stegeri (McGinty, 1955)

Synonyms
- Daphnella stegeri McGinty, 1955

= Eucyclotoma stegeri =

Species of gastropod

Eucyclotoma stegeri, common name Steger's turret, is a species of sea snail, a marine gastropod mollusk in the family Raphitomidae.

== Description ==
The length of the shell varies between 12 mm and 23 mm.

Its functional group is Benthos.

Its feeding type is predatory.

== Distribution ==
E. stegeri can be found in Atlantic waters, ranging from the eastern coast of Florida south to Brazil. It can also be found off of French Guiana and Guadeloupe.
