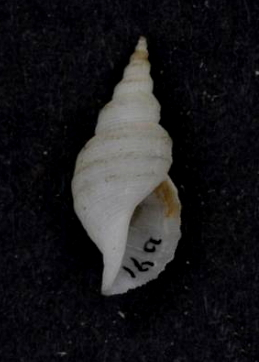
- Shell of Asperdaphne lactea

Scientific classification
- Kingdom: Animalia
- Phylum: Mollusca
- Class: Gastropoda
- Subclass: Caenogastropoda
- Order: Neogastropoda
- Superfamily: Conoidea
- Family: Raphitomidae
- Genus: Asperdaphne
- Species: A. lactea

Binomial name
- Asperdaphne lactea (Reeve, 1843)

Synonyms
- Daphnella fusiformis Garrett, 1873; Eucyclotoma fusiformis (Garrett, 1873) junior subjective synonym; Eucyclotoma lactea (Reeve, 1843) superseded combination; Eucyclotoma molleri (Reeve, 1846); Pleurotoma lactea Reeve, 1843 · unaccepted > superseded combination

= Asperdaphne lactea =

Species of gastropod

Asperdaphne lactea is a species of sea snail, a marine gastropod mollusk in the family Raphitomidae.

== Description ==
The length of the shell varies between 9 mm and 16 mm

(Described as Eucyclotoma fusiformis) The shell is longitudinally ribbed on the spire. The ribs are obsolete on the body whorl, where there are several minute periodical varices, with unequal, more or less crenulated revolving ridges. The outer lip is very finely crenulated. The sinus is small. The color of the shell is white, faintly tinged with yellowish brown.

== Distribution ==
This marine species occurs off the Paumotus, Tuamotu Archipelago, Taiwan and Queensland, Australia.
