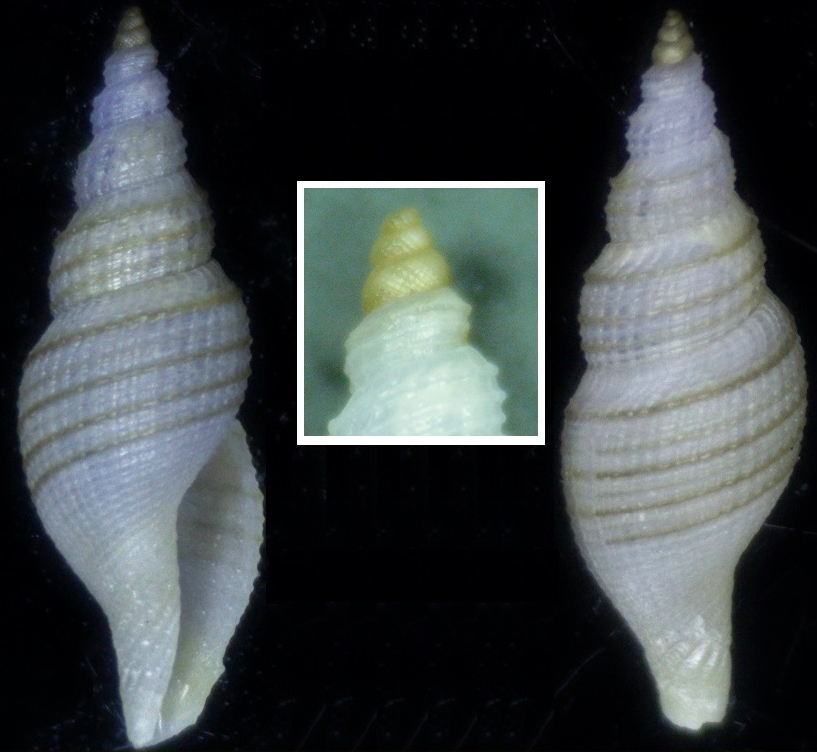
- Shell and protoconch of Asperdaphne aureola

Scientific classification
- Kingdom: Animalia
- Phylum: Mollusca
- Class: Gastropoda
- Subclass: Caenogastropoda
- Order: Neogastropoda
- Superfamily: Conoidea
- Family: Raphitomidae
- Genus: Asperdaphne
- Species: A. aureola

Binomial name
- Asperdaphne aureola (Reeve, 1845)

Synonyms
- Daphnella aureola (Reeve, 1845) superseded combination; Daphnella areola Reeve, 1845; Daphnella varicifera Pease, 1868; Daphnella (Daphnella) aureola (Reeve, 1845); Eucyclotoma varicifera (Pease, 1868); Pleurotoma aureola Reeve, 1845

= Asperdaphne aureola =

Species of gastropod

Asperdaphne aureola is a species of sea snail, a marine gastropod mollusk in the family Raphitomidae.

== Description ==
The length of the shell varies between 9 mm and 22 mm, its diameter 5 mm in the larger specimens.

The thin, transparent shell is spirally ridged, longitudinally very finely closely striated. The outer lip is crenulated within The small sinus is distinct. The shell has a pale golden color.

(Described as Eucyclotoma varicifera)The elongate shell is straightly acuminate, rather light and thin. It is decussated by longitudinal and transverse ridges. It contains six, flatly convex whorls, furnished here and there with somewhat indistinct varices. The aperture is wide. The siphonal canal is short. The color of the shell is white, stained with reddish brown.

== Distribution ==
This marine species occurs off the Philippines and in the Western Pacific Ocean.
