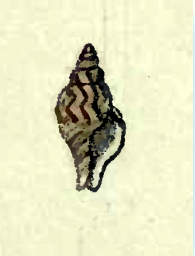
- Shell of Daphnella marmorata

Scientific classification
- Kingdom: Animalia
- Phylum: Mollusca
- Class: Gastropoda
- Subclass: Caenogastropoda
- Order: Neogastropoda
- Superfamily: Conoidea
- Family: Raphitomidae
- Genus: Daphnella
- Species: D. marmorata

Binomial name
- Daphnella marmorata Hinds, 1844

Synonyms
- Daphnella daphnelloides Reeve, 1845; Daphnella (Daphnella) marmorata Hinds, 1844; Pleurotoma daphnelloides Reeve, 1845

= Daphnella marmorata =

Species of gastropod

Daphnella marmorata is a species of sea snail, a marine gastropod mollusk in the family Raphitomidae.

== Description ==
The length of the shell attains 8 mm.

The whorls are flatly angulated around the upper part, elegantly cancellated with transverse and longitudinal striae. The columella is striated at the base. The color of the shell is whitish, longitudinally zigzag marbled with chestnut.

== Distribution ==
This marine species occurs off New Guinea and Queensland, Australia
