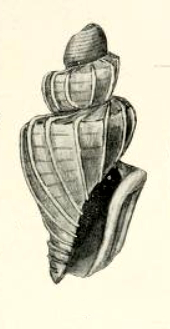
- Original image of a shell of Nepotilla microscopica

Scientific classification
- Kingdom: Animalia
- Phylum: Mollusca
- Class: Gastropoda
- Subclass: Caenogastropoda
- Order: Neogastropoda
- Superfamily: Conoidea
- Family: Raphitomidae
- Genus: Nepotilla
- Species: N. microscopica

Binomial name
- Nepotilla microscopica (May, 1916)

Synonyms
- Daphnella microscopica (May, 1915); Taranis microscopica May, 1916

= Nepotilla microscopica =

Species of gastropod

Nepotilla microscopica is a species of sea snail, a marine gastropod mollusk in the family Raphitomidae.

== Description ==
The length of the shell attains 1.3 mm, its diameter 0.7 mm.

(Original description) The very minute, yellowish shell contains 3½ whorls, including a 1½ whorled protoconch, which is large, rounded, and spirally lirate. The two adult whorls are strongly angled at the periphery, from whence to the suture they are flat or concave. The sculpture consists of sharp, narrow, axial ribs, about twelve on the body whorl, which extend from suture to suture, and pass into the aperture. They are widely separated, the interspaces being crossed by a few very faint spiral lirae. The aperture is rather expanded. The siphonal canal is very short. The columella is excavate. The outer lip is strongly varixed. The sinus at the suture is deep and open and bordered by a varix.

== Distribution ==
This marine species is endemic to Australia and occurs off Tasmania.
