= Nepotilla nezi =

Scientific classification
- Kingdom: Animalia
- Phylum: Mollusca
- Class: Gastropoda
- Subclass: Caenogastropoda
- Order: Neogastropoda
- Superfamily: Conoidea
- Family: Raphitomidae
- Genus: Nepotilla
- Species: N. nezi

Binomial name
- Nepotilla nezi (Okutani, 1964)

Synonyms
- Taranis nezi Okutani, 1964

Species of gastropod

Taranis nezi is a species of sea snail, a marine gastropod mollusk in the family Raphitomidae.

== Distribution ==
This marine species occurs off Japan.
