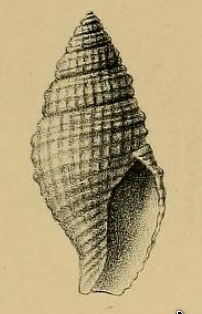
- Original image of a shell of Taranidaphne amphitrites

Scientific classification
- Kingdom: Animalia
- Phylum: Mollusca
- Class: Gastropoda
- Subclass: Caenogastropoda
- Order: Neogastropoda
- Superfamily: Conoidea
- Family: Raphitomidae
- Genus: Taranidaphne
- Species: T. amphitrites

Binomial name
- Taranidaphne amphitrites (Melvill & Standen, 1903)

Synonyms
- Daphnella (Pleurotomella) amphitrites Melvill & Standen, 1903; Pleurotomella amphitrites (Melvill, 1917); Taranis amphitrites Kilburn, 1991

= Taranidaphne amphitrites =

Species of gastropod

Taranidaphne amphitrites is a species of sea snail, a marine gastropod mollusk in the family Raphitomidae.

== Description ==
The length of the shell attains 8 mm, its diameter 3 mm.

(Original description in Latin) The delicate ovate-cylindrical shell is semi-transparent and has a milky white color. It contains 7-8 whorls of which 2⅓ whorls in the protoconch. These are white and rather slowly decussate. The subsequent whorls show lirate ribs. They are spirally crossed by denser lirae forming gemmules in the junctions. The white aperture is ovate-oblong with a glassy interior. The outer lip is thin. The siphonal canal is short and slightly recurved.

== Distribution ==
This marine species occurs in the Gulf of Oman and off Yemen.
