= Nepotilla amoena =

Scientific classification
- Kingdom: Animalia
- Phylum: Mollusca
- Class: Gastropoda
- Subclass: Caenogastropoda
- Order: Neogastropoda
- Superfamily: Conoidea
- Family: Raphitomidae
- Genus: Nepotilla
- Species: N. amoena

Binomial name
- Nepotilla amoena (Sars G.O., 1878)

Synonyms
- Rhaphitoma amoena Sars G. O., 1878; Taranis amoena G. O. Sars, 1878

Species of gastropod

Nepotilla amoena is a species of sea snail, a marine gastropod mollusk in the family Raphitomidae.

== Description ==
The length of the shell attains 8 mm.

== Distribution ==
This marine species occurs off Greenland, the Baffin Island, Canada and from Northern Norway to Southwest Sweden.
