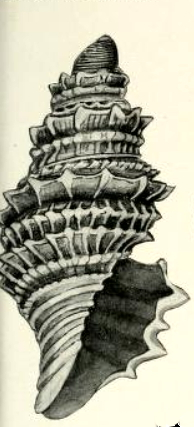
- Original image of a shell of Nepotilla aculeata

Scientific classification
- Kingdom: Animalia
- Phylum: Mollusca
- Class: Gastropoda
- Subclass: Caenogastropoda
- Order: Neogastropoda
- Superfamily: Conoidea
- Family: Raphitomidae
- Genus: Nepotilla
- Species: N. aculeata

Binomial name
- Nepotilla aculeata (May, 1916)

Synonyms
- Taranis aculeata May, 1916

= Nepotilla aculeata =

Species of gastropod

Nepotilla aculeata is a species of sea snail, a marine gastropod mollusk in the family Raphitomidae.

== Description ==
The length of the shell attains 3 mm, its diameter 1.8 mm

(Original description) The small, yellowish brown shell is broadly fusiform, It contains five whorls, including a prominent two-whorled protoconch, which is finely spirally lirate. The adult whorls are strongly angled about the upper third by a prominent spiral keel, which bears at regular intervals well developed spinose nodules, about 10 on the body whorl. Above to the suture the whorl is concavely hollowed, with a finely nodulous keel. Below the carina are two prominent keels, bearing numerous sharp nodules, connected somewhat irregularly above and below, with axial riblets. On the base are about seven keels, the first two slightly nodose, the rest smooth. The three prominent keels give the whorls a square appearance. The aperture is rather expanded. The siphonal canal is short and open. The columella is concave, corrugated by the basal keels, which pass into the shell. The outer lip is armed by four spines, alternating large and small. The sinus is sutural, deep and narrow, bounded on one side by the sutural lirae, and on the other by the finely a nodulous keel.

== Distribution ==
This marine species is endemic to Australia and occurs off Tasmania.
