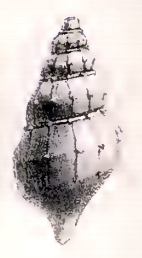
- Drawing of a shell of Drilliola emendata

Scientific classification
- Kingdom: Animalia
- Phylum: Mollusca
- Class: Gastropoda
- Subclass: Caenogastropoda
- Order: Neogastropoda
- Superfamily: Conoidea
- Family: Borsoniidae
- Genus: Drilliola
- Species: D. emendata

Binomial name
- Drilliola emendata (Monterosato, 1872)

Synonyms
- Asthenotoma (Drilliola) emendata (Monterosato, 1872); Pleurotoma emendatum (Monterosato, 1872); Pleurotoma emendatum var. atlantica Locard 1897; Taranis albatrosi Nordsieck, F., 1971; Taranis emendata Monterosato, 1872 (original combination)

= Drilliola emendata =

Species of gastropod

Drilliola emendata is a species of sea snail, a marine gastropod mollusk in the family Borsoniidae.

== Description ==
The brown shell grows to a length of 9 mm (0.35 in). The whorls show three cingulae and two lirae. The body whorl is spirally multicingulate and longitudinally lirulate. The suture is slightly but distinctly incised. The aperture is white within. The siphonal canal is short and wide. The sinus is wide between the first and second carina.

== Distribution ==
This species occurs in the Mediterranean Sea off Greece and Sicily.
