= Nepotilla minuta =

Scientific classification
- Kingdom: Animalia
- Phylum: Mollusca
- Class: Gastropoda
- Subclass: Caenogastropoda
- Order: Neogastropoda
- Superfamily: Conoidea
- Family: Raphitomidae
- Genus: Nepotilla
- Species: N. minuta

Binomial name
- Nepotilla minuta (Tenison-Woods, 1877)

Synonyms
- Daphnella mimica fusca Sowerby, G.B. (3rd) 1897; Daphnella minuta (Tenison-Woods, 1877); Drillia minuta Tenison-Woods, 1877; Eucyclotoma minuta Reeve, 1844; Zenepos minuta (Tenison-Woods, 1877)

Species of gastropod

Nepotilla minuta, common name the minute turrid, is a species of sea snail, a marine gastropod mollusk in the family Raphitomidae.

Daphnella minuta Verco, 1909 is a synonym of Nepotilla mimica (Sowerby III, 1896), according to Hedley (1922).

== Description ==
The length of the shell attains 6 mm.

(Original description) The minute shell is fusiform, turreted, elongate and thin. It is saturated with a reddish chestnut. It contains 6 convex whorls, including the protoconch. They are spirally many keeled and between the keels thickly and slenderly longitudinally lirate. The protoconch consists of two subinflated whorls which are spirally and equally striate. The aperture is shorter than the spire, elongately ovate. The outer lip is thin and sinuous. The inner lip is inconspicuous.

== Distribution ==
This marine species is endemic to Australia and occurs off South Australia, Tasmania and Victoria.
