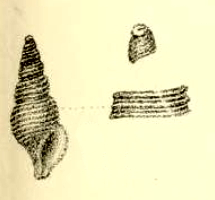
- Original image of a shell of Nepotilla mimica

Scientific classification
- Kingdom: Animalia
- Phylum: Mollusca
- Class: Gastropoda
- Subclass: Caenogastropoda
- Order: Neogastropoda
- Superfamily: Conoidea
- Family: Raphitomidae
- Genus: Nepotilla
- Species: N. mimica

Binomial name
- Nepotilla mimica (Sowerby III, 1896)

Synonyms
- 'Daphnella (Teres) mimica Sowerby III, 1896; Zenepos mimica (Sowerby III, 1897)

= Nepotilla mimica =

Species of gastropod

Nepotilla mimica is a species of sea snail, a marine gastropod mollusk in the family Raphitomidae.

Variety
Nepotilla mimica fusca (Sowerby III, 1896) : a dark brown variety.

== Description ==
The length of the shell attains 7 mm, its diameter 2.5 mm.

This little, white, turreted shell bears rather a curious resemblance to the Daphnella (Teres) (synonym of Teretia teres (Reeve, 1844) ). The spire is elongate and very sharp. The shell contains 6 convex, rounded whorls. These are slightly concave at the top. The sculpture consists of conspicuous lirae, alternated with smaller lirae, sculptedc lengthwise by minute, oblique lamellae. The body whorl is rather short, contracted at the base and slightly rostrate. The columella is slightly twisted. The aperture is ovate. The outer lip is sharp and arcuate. The sinus is deep and not very wide.

The author has only seen three specimens, the type here described being the largest. The two smaller ones are shorter in proportion, and not so concave at the top of the whorls.

== Distribution ==
This marine species is endemic to Australia and occurs off Victoria, South Australia and Tasmania
