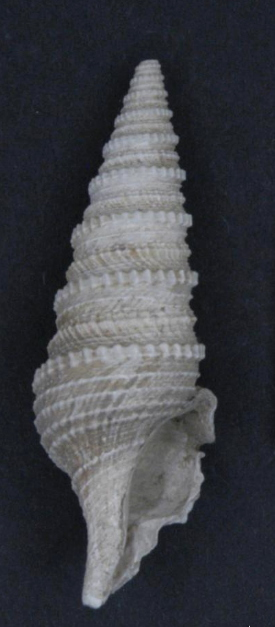
- Shell of Oliveragemmula congener (specimen at Naturalis Biodiversity Center)

Scientific classification
- Kingdom: Animalia
- Phylum: Mollusca
- Class: Gastropoda
- Subclass: Caenogastropoda
- Order: Neogastropoda
- Superfamily: Conoidea
- Family: Turridae
- Genus: Oliveragemmula
- Species: O. congener

Binomial name
- Oliveragemmula congener (E.A. Smith, 1894)

Synonyms
- Gemmula congener congener (E.A. Smith, 1894); Gemmula (Gemmula) congener (E.A. Smith, 1894); Pleurotoma (Gemmula) congener E.A. Smith, 1894; † Pleurotoma (Gemmula) congener var. mekranica Vredenburg, 1925 junior subjective synonym; Pleurotoma congener E. A. Smith, 1894 superseded combination; Turris (Gemmula) congener (E.A. Smith, 1894)

= Oliveragemmula congener =

Species of gastropod

Oliveragemmula congener, common name Melvill's turrid, is a species of sea snail, a marine gastropod mollusk in the family Turridae, the turrids.

== Synonyms ==
- Gemmula congener cosmoi (Sykes, 1930): synonym of Oliveragemmula cosmoi (Sykes, 1930)
- Gemmula congener diomedea Powell, 1964: synonym of Oliveragemmula diomedea (A. W. B. Powell, 1964)
- Gemmula congener unilineata Powell, 1967: synonym of Cryptogemma unilineata (Powell, 1967) (basionym)
- Gemmula congener webberae Kilburn, 1975: synonym of Cryptogemma webberae (Kilburn, 1975)

== Description ==
The length of the shell varies between 40 mm and 90 mm.

(Original description in Latin) The white shell is fusiform and robust. It is faintly reddish-banded below the suture and reddish-dotted between the tubercles around the middle of the whorls. There are 10-12 convex whorls, encircled below the suture by a double band and around the middle by another flattened, tuberculated band. They are adorned with a few thin spiral lirae and conspicuous growth lines. The body whorl, below the band, is encircled by 5-6 lirae and intercalating striae, narrowing inferiorly and produced into a rostrum (beak). The columella is slightly oblique and rather straight. The outer lip is thin and incised at the tuberculated band. The aperture is lirate internally.

== Distribution ==
This marine species occurs in the Indo-West Pacific, in the Bay of Bengal, off the Philippines and off Western Australia; in the East China Sea, northern South China Sea and Nansha Islands; off Japan.
