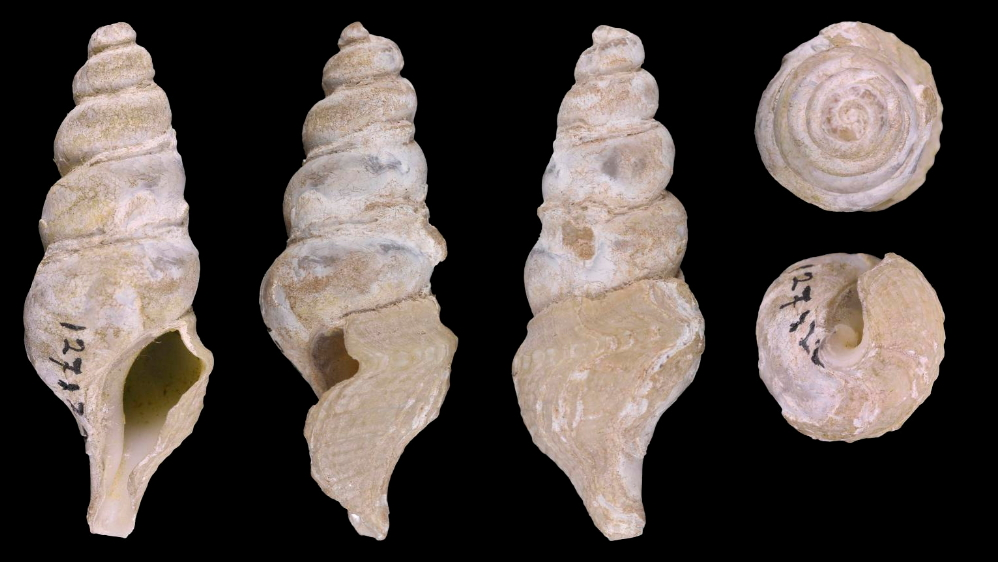
- Shell of Cryptogemma praesignis (holotype at the Smithsonian Institution)

Scientific classification
- Kingdom: Animalia
- Phylum: Mollusca
- Class: Gastropoda
- Subclass: Caenogastropoda
- Order: Neogastropoda
- Superfamily: Conoidea
- Family: Turridae
- Genus: Cryptogemma; Dall, 1918

Type species
- Gemmula benthima Dall, 1908

Species
- See text

Synonyms
- Bathybermudia F. Haas, 1949; Gemmula (Pinguigemmula) MacNeil, 1961; Pinguigemmula MacNeil, 1961; Ptychosyrinx Thiele, 1925

= Cryptogemma =

Genus of gastropods

Cryptogemma is a genus of sea snails, marine gastropod mollusks in the family Turridae, the turrids.

== Distribution ==
These are deep-sea species with a wide geographic distribution.

== Species ==
According to Zaccharias et al. (2020) this genus should only include:

- Cryptogemma aethiopica (Thiele, 1925)
- Cryptogemma periscelida (Dall, 1889)
- Cryptogemma phymatias (Watson, 1886)
- Cryptogemma powelli Zaharias, Kantor, Fedosov, Criscione, Hallan, Kano, Bardin & Puillandre, 2020
- Cryptogemma praesignis (Smith, 1895)
- Cryptogemma tessellata (Powell, 1964)
- Cryptogemma timorensis (Tesch, 1915)
- Cryptogemma unilineata (Powell, 1964).

The others should be excluded from this genus because the lack key characters such as the narrow fusiform shell and the well-marked peripheral anal sinus. They show closer resemblances to other conoidean families (such as Horaiclavidae) than to Turridae.

Species within the genus Cryptogemma include (according to WoRMS):

- Cryptogemma aethiopica (Thiele, 1925)
- Cryptogemma calypso Dall, 1919 (taxon inquirendum)
- Cryptogemma chrysothemis Dall, 1919 (taxon inquirendum)
- Cryptogemma cornea (Okutani, 1966) (taxon inquirendum)
- Cryptogemma eldorana (Dall, 1908) (taxon inquirendum)
- Cryptogemma japonica (Okutani, 1964) (taxon inquirendum)
- Cryptogemma longicostata Sysoev & Kantor, 1986 (taxon inquirendum)
- Cryptogemma oregonensis Dall, 1919 (taxon inquirendum)
- Cryptogemma periscelida (Dall, 1889)
- Cryptogemma phymatias (Watson, 1886)
- Cryptogemma polystephanus (Dall, 1908) (taxon inquirendum)
- Cryptogemma powelli Zaharias, Kantor, Fedosov, Criscione, Hallan, Kano, Bardin & Puillandre, 2020
- Cryptogemma praesignis (E. A. Smith, 1895)
- Cryptogemma quentinensis Dall, 1919 (taxon inquirendum)
- † Cryptogemma richmondi Ladd, 1982
- † Cryptogemma senex Frassinetti & Covacevich, 1995
- Cryptogemma tessellata (Powell, 1967)
- Cryptogemma timorensis (Tesch, 1915)
- Cryptogemma unilineata (Powell, 1967)
- Cryptogemma webberae (Kilburn, 1975)
- † Cryptogemma yokoyamai Taki & Oyama, 1954 (uncertain, unassessed)

Species brought into synonymy

- Cryptogemma adrastia Dall, 1919: synonym of Carinoturris adrastia (Dall, 1919) (original combination)
- Cryptogemma antigone Dall, 1919: synonym of Antiplanes antigone (Dall, 1919) (original combination)
- Cryptogemma benthima (Dall, 1908): synonym of Cryptogemma phymatias (R. B. Watson, 1886)
- † Cryptogemma borgenae Tegland, 1933: synonym of † Turrinosyrinx borgenae (Tegland, 1933) (superseded combination)
- Cryptogemma chilensis (Berry, 1968): synonym of Thielesyrinx chilensis (S. S. Berry, 1968) (superseded combination)
- Cryptogemma corneus (Okutani, 1966): synonym of Cryptogemma cornea (Okutani, 1966) (incorrect grammatical agreement of specific epithet)
- Cryptogemma cymothoe Dall, 1919: synonym of Borsonella callicesta (Dall, 1902) (junior subjective synonym)
- Cryptogemma eidola Dall, W.H., 1919: synonym of Borsonella callicesta (Dall, 1902)
- Cryptogemma polycaste Dall, 1919: synonym of Carinoturris polycaste (Dall, 1919) (original combination)
