= Ptychosyrinx =

Scientific classification
- Kingdom: Animalia
- Phylum: Mollusca
- Class: Gastropoda
- Subclass: Caenogastropoda
- Order: Neogastropoda
- Family: Turridae
- Genus: Ptychosyrinx; Thiele, 1925

Genus of gastropods

Ptychosyrinx is a genus of sea snails and marine gastropod mollusks in the family Turridae, the turrids.

This genus has become a synonym of Cryptogemma Dall, 1918

== Species ==
Species within the genus Ptychosyrinx include:

- Ptychosyrinx bisinuata (Martens, 1901): synonym of Cryptogemma praesignis (E. A. Smith, 1895)
- Ptychosyrinx carynae (Haas, 1949): synonym of Cryptogemma phymatias (R. B. Watson, 1886)
- Ptychosyrinx chilensis Berry, 1968: synonym of Thielesyrinx chilensis (S. S. Berry, 1968)
- Ptychosyrinx lobata (G.B. Sowerby III, 1903): synonym of Cryptogemma praesignis (E. A. Smith, 1895)
- Ptychosyrinx nodulosus (Gmelin, 1791): synonym of Ptychobela nodulosa (Gmelin, 1791)
