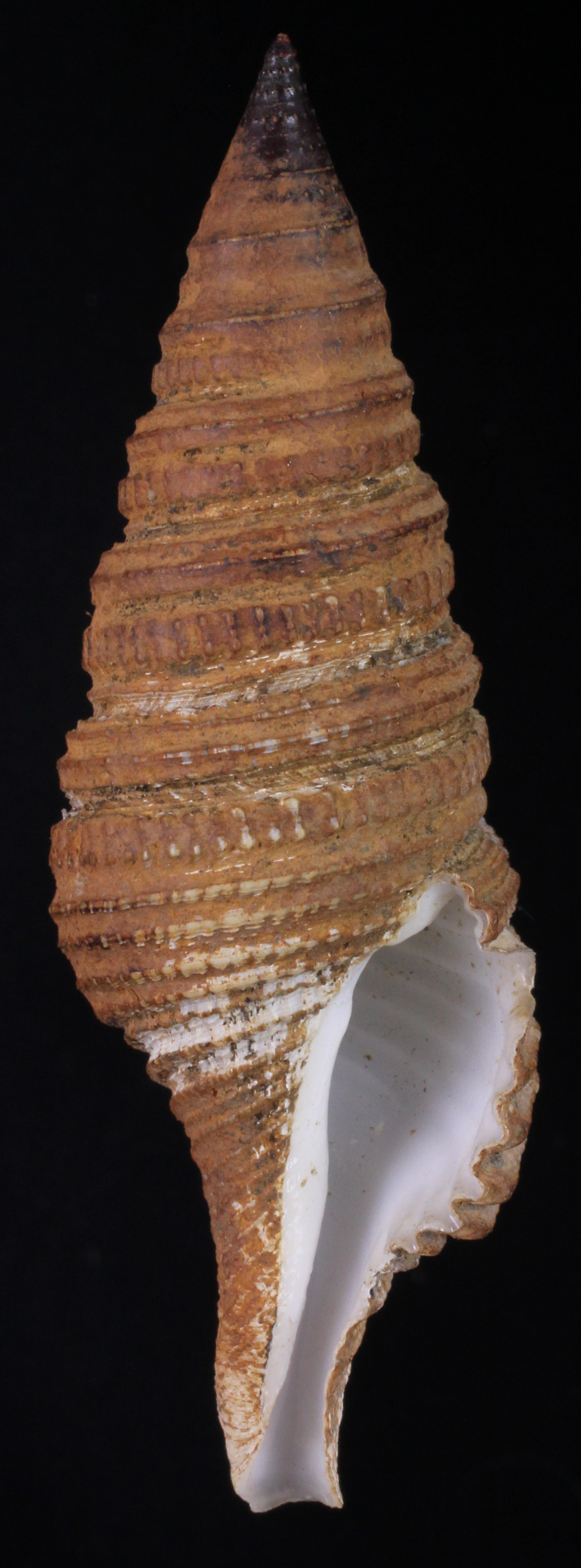
- Shell of Oliveragemmula diomedea (specimen at MNHN, Paris)

Scientific classification
- Kingdom: Animalia
- Phylum: Mollusca
- Class: Gastropoda
- Subclass: Caenogastropoda
- Order: Neogastropoda
- Superfamily: Conoidea
- Family: Turridae
- Genus: Oliveragemmula; Kantor, Bouchet, Fedosov, Puillandre & Zaharias, 2024

Type species
- Pleurotoma kieneri Doumet, 1840

= Oliveragemmula =

Genus of gastropods

Oliveragemmula is a genus of marine gastropod molluscs or micromolluscs in the family Turridae, the turrids.

== Etymology ==
The genus is named after Professor Baldomero M. ‘Toto’ Olivera, pioneer of research on conoidean toxins and the author of many species of Turridae from the Philippines, and also referring to the overall similarity of the new genus to the earlier broader concept of Gemmula.

== Species ==
All these species formerly belonged to the genus Gemmula

- Oliveragemmula congener (E. A. Smith, 1894)
- Oliveragemmula cosmoi (Sykes, 1930)
- Oliveragemmula dampierana (A. W. B. Powell, 1964)
- Oliveragemmula diomedea (A. W. B. Powell, 1964)
- Oliveragemmula gilchristi (G. B. Sowerby III, 1902)
- Oliveragemmula kieneri (Doumet, 1840)
- Oliveragemmula murrayi (A. W. B. Powell, 1964)
- Oliveragemmula rosario (Shikama & Hayashi, 1977)
- Oliveragemmula sogodensis (B. M. Olivera, 2005)
- Oliveragemmula speciosa (Reeve, 1842)
- Oliveragemmula subfenestrata (Kosuge, 1990)
- Oliveragemmula vagata (E. A. Smith, 1895)
- Oliveragemmula westaustralis (Kosuge, 1990)
