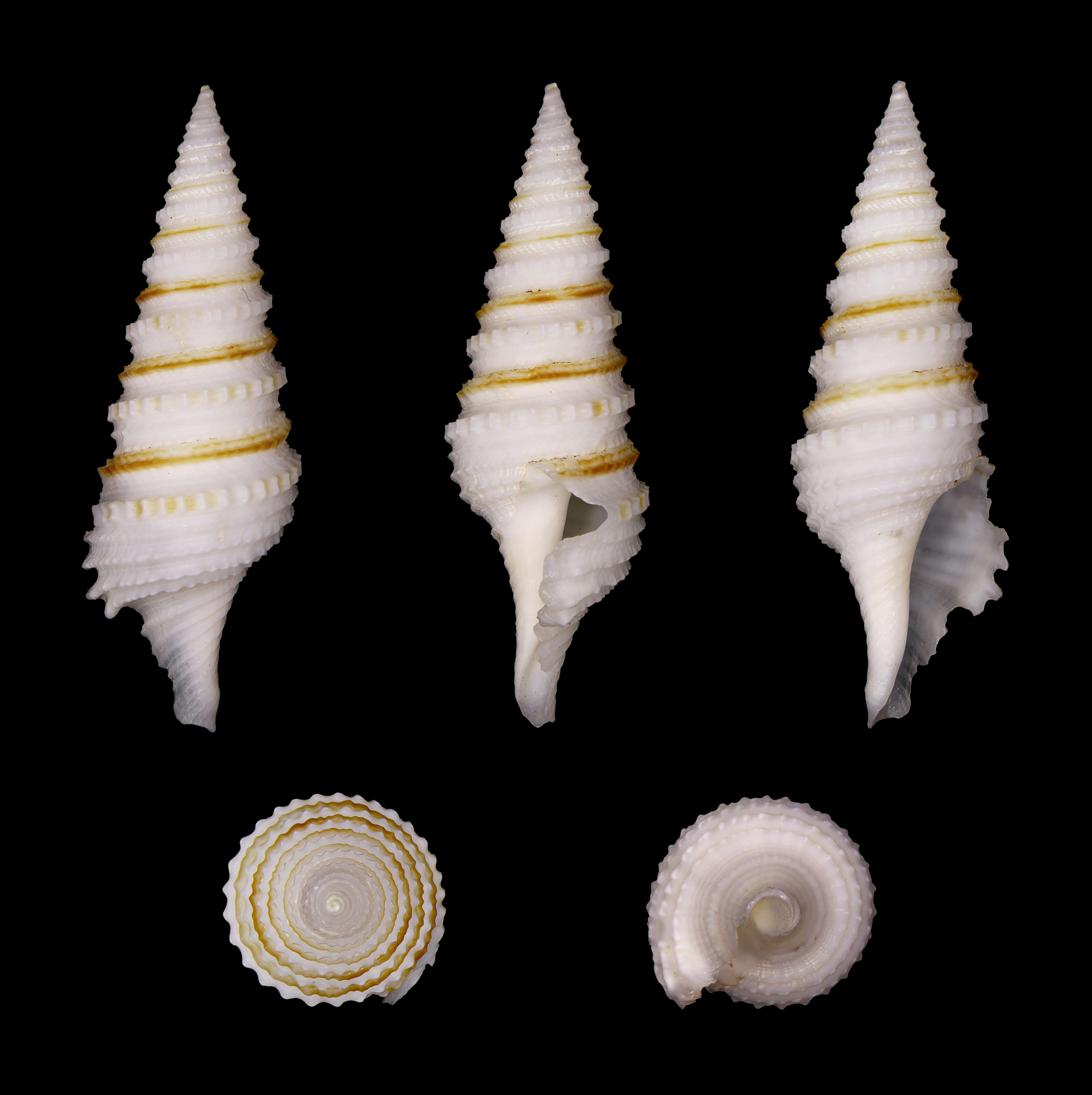
- Shell of Gemmula_kieneri

Scientific classification
- Kingdom: Animalia
- Phylum: Mollusca
- Class: Gastropoda
- Subclass: Caenogastropoda
- Order: Neogastropoda
- Superfamily: Conoidea
- Family: Turridae
- Genus: Gemmula
- Species: G. kieneri

Binomial name
- Gemmula kieneri (Doumet, 1840)

Synonyms
- Gemmula (Gemmula) kieneri (Doumet), Kilburn, 1983; Gemmula kieneri (Doumet, 1840); Pleurotoma carinata Reeve, 1843 (not Bivona, 1838); Pleurotoma kieneri Doumet, 1840

= Oliveragemmula kieneri =

Species of gastropod

Gemmula kieneri is a species of sea snail, a marine gastropod mollusk in the family Turridae, the turrids.

Its mineralized tissue is made up of calcium carbonate. One may find it in a water depth of 50m (min) to 346m (max).

Subspecies

- † Gemmula kieneri ryuktjuensis MacNeil, 1960
- † Gemmula kieneri woodwardi (Martin, 1884)

== Description ==
The length of this robust, fusiform shell varies between 26.2 mm and 73 mm.

AWB Powell (1964) pointed out that this species is very similar to Gemmula speciosa (Reeve, 1842)

== Distribution ==
This marine species occurs off Papua New Guinea, in the East China Sea and South China Sea, Nansha Islands; off Japan and the Philippines; off Queensland, Australia.
