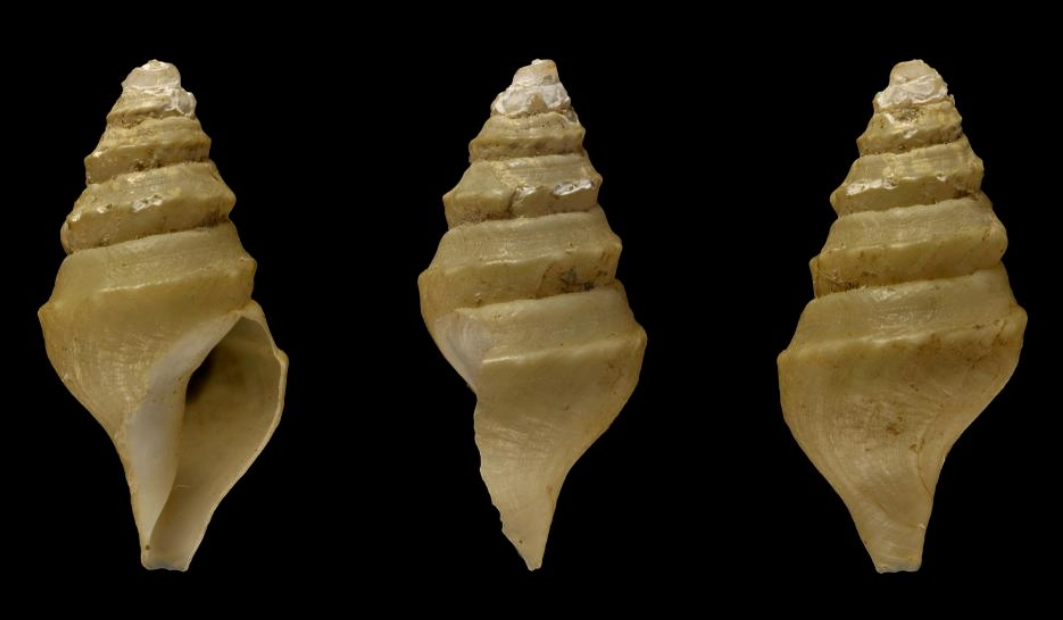
- Shell of Cryptogemma chrysothemis (holotype at the Smithsonian Institution)

Scientific classification
- Kingdom: Animalia
- Phylum: Mollusca
- Class: Gastropoda
- Subclass: Caenogastropoda
- Order: Neogastropoda
- Superfamily: Conoidea
- Family: Turridae
- Genus: Cryptogemma
- Species: C. chrysothemis

Binomial name
- Cryptogemma chrysothemis Dall, 1919

Synonyms
- Spirotropis chrysothemis (Dall, 1919)

= Cryptogemma chrysothemis =

Species of gastropod

Cryptogemma chrysothemis is a species of sea snail, a marine gastropod mollusk in the family Turridae, the turrids.

== Description ==
The length of the (eroded) shell attains 16.5 mm, its diameter 7.5 mm.

(Original description) The short-fusiform shell is white, with a pale olive periostracum. The tip is eroded. The shell contains six or more subsequent whorls. The suture is distinct. The anal sulcus is shallow and somewhat removed from the suture. The fascicle is narrow and depressed. The spiral sculpture consists of a low blunt peripheral keel, somewhat undulated on the earlier whorls with occasional traces of minor spiral threads. The entire surface is more or less obliquely granulose or minutely vermiculate. The axial sculpture consists only of feeble incremental lines. The outer lip is thin, sharp and produced. The inner lip is erased. The columella is short and obliquely attenuated in front. The siphonal canal is short, wide and not recurved. The axis is not pervious.

== Distribution ==
This marine species can be found between San Clemente and Santa Catalina Islands, California, USA.
