= Cryptogemma oregonensis =

Scientific classification
- Kingdom: Animalia
- Phylum: Mollusca
- Class: Gastropoda
- Subclass: Caenogastropoda
- Order: Neogastropoda
- Superfamily: Conoidea
- Family: Turridae
- Genus: Cryptogemma
- Species: C. oregonensis

Binomial name
- Cryptogemma oregonensis W. H. Dall, 1919

Species of gastropod

Cryptogemma oregonensis is a species of sea snail, a marine gastropod mollusk in the family Turridae, the turrids.

== Description ==
The small, white shell has a pale olivaceous periostracum. It consists of more than four whorls but the apex is eroded. The suture is distinct. The whorl in front of the suture as far as the shoulder is flattish. The shoulder of the whorl is strongly marked and angular. It is coronated on the penultimate whorl by the ends of about 25 straight, protractively oblique narrow ribs with subequal interspaces, becoming obsolete on the base of the body whorl. Incremental lines are more or less distinct but not regular. The spiral sculpture consists of one or two feeble impressed lines on the whorl above the shoulder, and three or four widely spaced threads on the base, though the region of the siphonal canal is free from spiral sculpture. The aperture is narrow. The anal sulcus is wide and shallow. The thin outer lip is produced, thin. The body and columella are erased. The siphonal canal is rather short. The axis is pervious.

== Distribution ==
This species occurs in the Pacific Ocean off Oregon, USA.
