= Oliveragemmula murrayi =

Scientific classification
- Kingdom: Animalia
- Phylum: Mollusca
- Class: Gastropoda
- Subclass: Caenogastropoda
- Order: Neogastropoda
- Superfamily: Conoidea
- Family: Turridae
- Genus: Oliveragemmula
- Species: O. murrayi

Binomial name
- Oliveragemmula murrayi (A.W.B. Powell, 1964)

Synonyms
- Gemmula (Gemmula) murrayi Powell, 1964; Gemmula murrayi A. W. B. Powell, 1964 superseded combination

Species of gastropod

Oliveragemmula murrayi is a species of sea snail, a marine gastropod mollusk in the family Turridae, the turrids. It was originally named Gemmula murrayi and discovered by A. W. B. Powell in 1964 but renamed to O. murrayi in 2024 to match recent data on the species.

== Description ==
According to the information provided by A. W. B. Powell, the length of the adult O. murrayi shell varies between 35 mm and 40 mm in height. The shell is described as having an "elongate-fusiform, with a tall spire and long straight canal". The color is described as a pale creamy in the buff, with the sinus rib and all major spirals lined in light-brown. However, the main spiral of the subsutural fold is darker brown than any of the other spirals.

== Distribution ==
This marine species occurs in the Gulf of Oman and in the Persian Gulf; also in the Gulf of Carpentaria, Australia.
