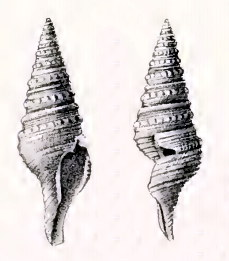
- Original drawing with two views of a shell of Oliveragemmula gilchristi

Scientific classification
- Kingdom: Animalia
- Phylum: Mollusca
- Class: Gastropoda
- Subclass: Caenogastropoda
- Order: Neogastropoda
- Superfamily: Conoidea
- Family: Turridae
- Genus: Oliveragemmula
- Species: O. gilchristi

Binomial name
- Oliveragemmula gilchristi (G.B. Sowerby III, 1902)

Synonyms
- Gemmula (Gemmula) gilchristi (G. B. Sowerby III, 1902); Gemmula gilchristi (G. B. Sowerby III, 1902) superseded combination; Pleurotoma gilchristi Sowerby III, 1902 (original combination); Turris gilchristi (G. B. Sowerby III, 1902)

= Oliveragemmula gilchristi =

Species of gastropod

Oliveragemmula gilchristi is a species of sea snail, a marine gastropod mollusk in the family Turridae, the turrids.

== Description ==
The length of the shell of the holotype attains 32 mm, its width 11 mm.

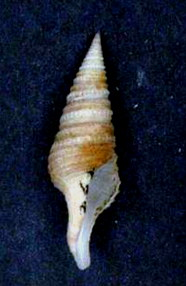
Apertural view of a shell of Gemmula gilchristi (museum specimen at Naturalis Biodiversity Center)

(Original description) The elongately fusiform shell is posterior longer than the anterior. It is whitish tinged, and banded with pale yellow- The spire is elongately turreted, slightly convex at the sides, acute at the apex. It contains 12 whorls. The apical ones are smooth, rounded and regular The rest are sloping, scarcely convex, with a double keel above, beneath which is a deepish rut, and about the middle of the whorl a stouter keel ornamented with rather close-set, gem-like tubercles. The interstices between the keels are ridged and grooved. The suture of the upper whorls is transversely plicate, and of the lower narrowly canaliculate. The body whorl is rather convex with the tubercles, becoming longitudinally narrower, and the keel bearing them less prominent, beneath which there are several acute keels and intervening lirae. The whorl is also sculptured with numerous obliquely-curved longitudinal plicae. The rostrum is of moderate length. The aperture is elongately sub-oval. The sinus is rather deep, and not very wide. The siphonal canal is open, moderately wide, and slightly curved.

== Distribution ==
This marine species occurs off South Africa, Zanzibar, Andaman Islands, New Guinea, and Japan; in the East China Sea, the South China Sea.
