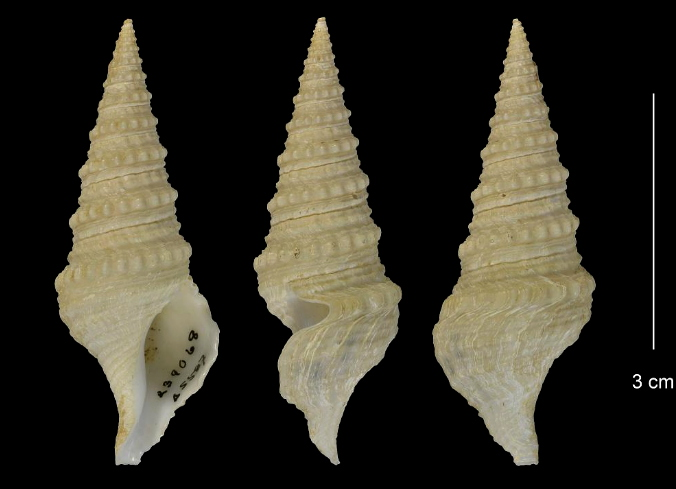
- Shell of Cryptogemma timorensis (holotype at MNHN, Paris)

Scientific classification
- Kingdom: Animalia
- Phylum: Mollusca
- Class: Gastropoda
- Subclass: Caenogastropoda
- Order: Neogastropoda
- Superfamily: Conoidea
- Family: Turridae
- Genus: Cryptogemma
- Species: C. timorensis

Binomial name
- Cryptogemma timorensis (Tesch, 1915)

Synonyms
- Gemmula teschi (Powell, 1964); † Pleurotoma ktolemandoensis K. Martin, 1933; † Pleurotoma timorensis Tesch, 1915 † (original combination); Ptychosyrinx timorensis (Tesch, 1915); Ptychosyrinx timorensis teschi Powell, 1964

= Cryptogemma timorensis =

Species of gastropod

Cryptogemma timorensis is a species of sea snail, a marine gastropod mollusk in the family Turridae, the turrids.

== Distribution ==
This marine species occurs off Timor Island.
