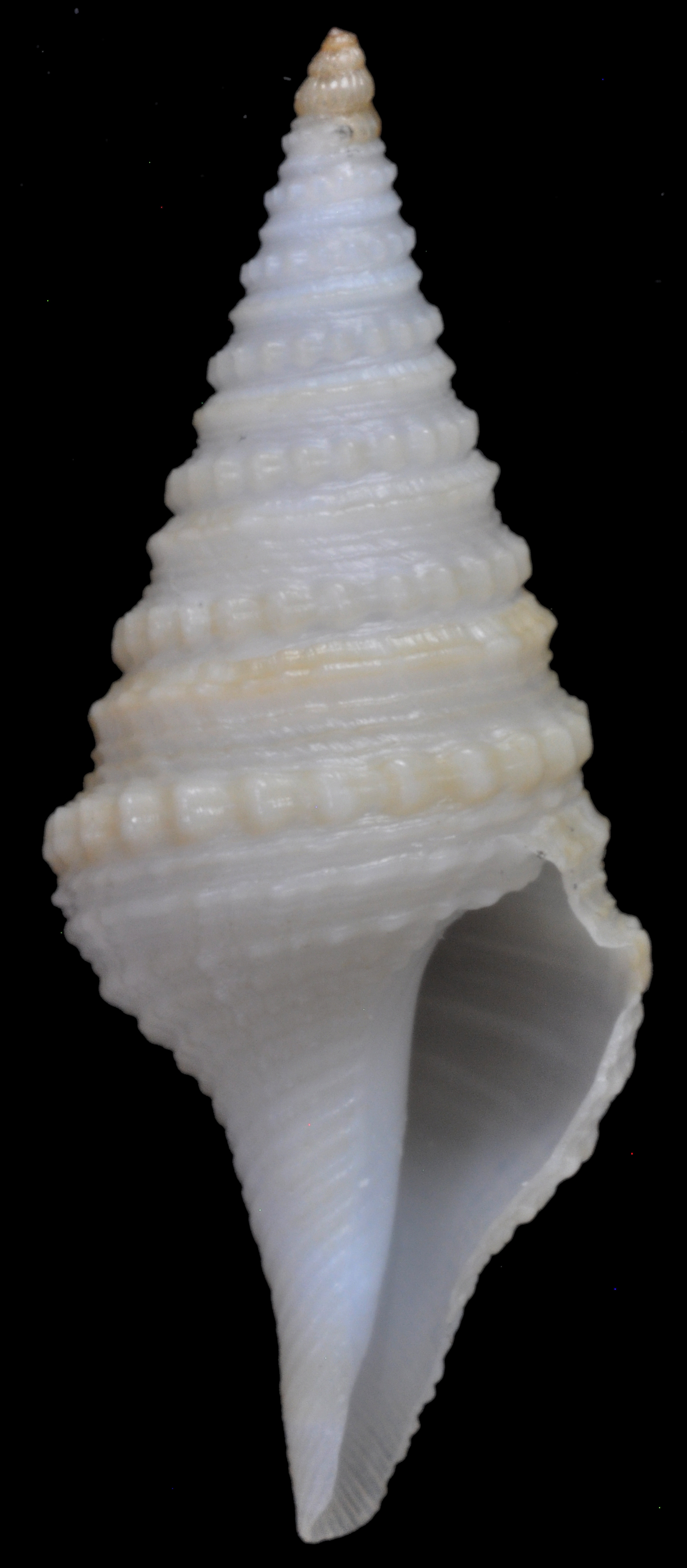
- Shell of Cryptogemma powelli (paratype at MNHN, Paris)

Scientific classification
- Kingdom: Animalia
- Phylum: Mollusca
- Class: Gastropoda
- Subclass: Caenogastropoda
- Order: Neogastropoda
- Superfamily: Conoidea
- Family: Turridae
- Genus: Cryptogemma
- Species: C. powelli

Binomial name
- Cryptogemma powelli Zaharias, Kantor, Fedosov, Criscione, Hallan, Kano, Bardin & Puillandre, 2020

= Cryptogemma powelli =

Species of gastropod

Cryptogemma powelli is a species of sea snail, a marine gastropod mollusk in the family Turridae, the turrids.

== Distribution ==
This marine species occurs off New Caledonia.
