= Carinoturris fortis =

Scientific classification
- Kingdom: Animalia
- Phylum: Mollusca
- Class: Gastropoda
- Subclass: Caenogastropoda
- Order: Neogastropoda
- Superfamily: Conoidea
- Family: Pseudomelatomidae
- Genus: Carinoturris
- Species: C. fortis

Binomial name
- Carinoturris fortis Bartsch, 1944

Species of gastropod

Carinoturris fortis is a species of sea snail, a marine gastropod mollusk in the family Pseudomelatomidae, the turrids and allies.

== Description ==
The length of the decollated shell measures 16 mm, its diameter is 7 mm.

== Distribution ==
This species occurs in the Pacific Ocean off California, United States.
