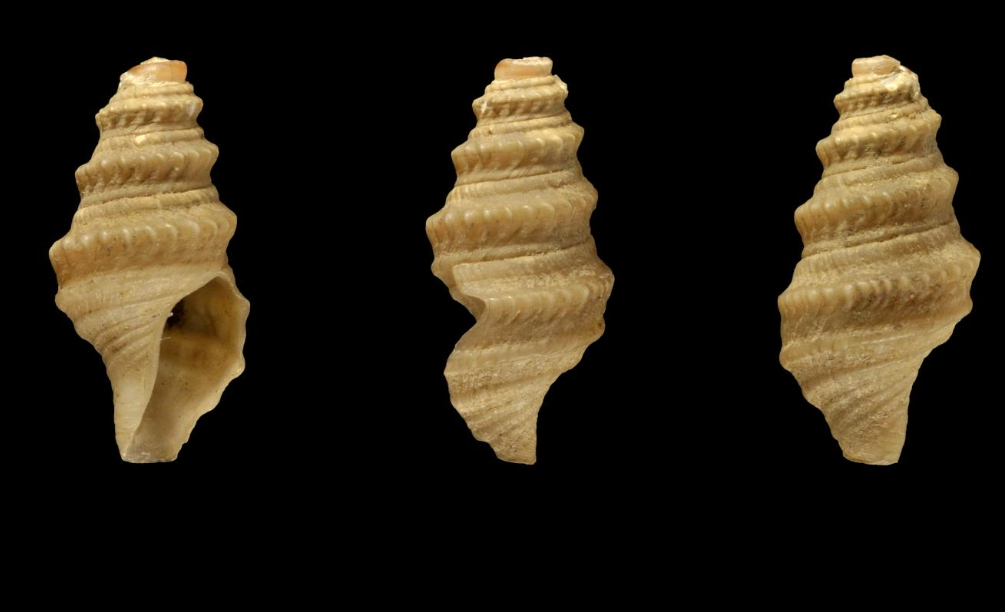
- Shell of Cryptogemma quentinensis (holotype at the Smithsonian Institution)

Scientific classification
- Kingdom: Animalia
- Phylum: Mollusca
- Class: Gastropoda
- Subclass: Caenogastropoda
- Order: Neogastropoda
- Superfamily: Conoidea
- Family: Turridae
- Genus: Cryptogemma
- Species: C. quentinensis

Binomial name
- Cryptogemma quentinensis Dall, 1919

= Cryptogemma quentinensis =

Species of gastropod

Cryptogemma quentinensis is a species of sea snail in the family Turridae.

== Description ==
The length of the shell attains 12 mm, its diameter 5 mm.

(Original description) The small, solid shell is white under an olivaceous periostracum. It has five (decollate) whorls. The suture is distinct, bordered by a rounded ridge on each side. The surface is dull. The spiral sculpture consists of a prominent nodulous peripheral ridge which is the anal fasciole, with two smaller ridges in front of it with wider interspaces. In front of the first of these the suture is laid. The space between this and the second is more or less channeled, but these two ridges are not nodulous. In front of these four or five obscure threads appear on the siphonal canal. The axial sculpture consists of strong retractive wrinkles at the suture, which become arcuate nodulous riblets on the fasciole and dwindle protractively in front of it. There are also more or less obvious incremental lines. The aperture is moderate and simple. The axis is pervious. The columella is short and attenuated in front The siphonal canal is short and slightly recurved. The operculum is narrow, with an apical nucleus.

== Distribution ==
This marine species occurs off Cape San Quentin, Lower California.
