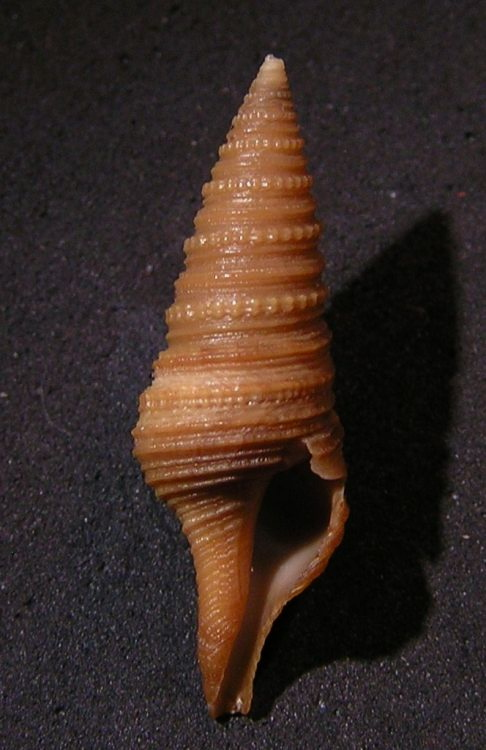
- Shell of Oliveragemmula rosario

Scientific classification
- Kingdom: Animalia
- Phylum: Mollusca
- Class: Gastropoda
- Subclass: Caenogastropoda
- Order: Neogastropoda
- Superfamily: Conoidea
- Family: Turridae
- Genus: Oliveragemmula
- Species: O. rosario

Binomial name
- Oliveragemmula rosario Shikama, 1977

Synonyms
- Gemmula (Gemmula) rosario Shikama, T. & S. Hayashi in Shikama, T., 1977; Gemmula rosario Shikama & Hayashi, 1977 superseded combination

= Oliveragemmula rosario =

Species of gastropod

Oliveragemmula rosario is a species of sea snail, a marine gastropod mollusk in the family Turridae, the turrids.

== Description ==
The length of the shell varies between 18 mm and 42 mm.

== Distribution ==
This marine species occurs from Southeast Africa to Japan.
