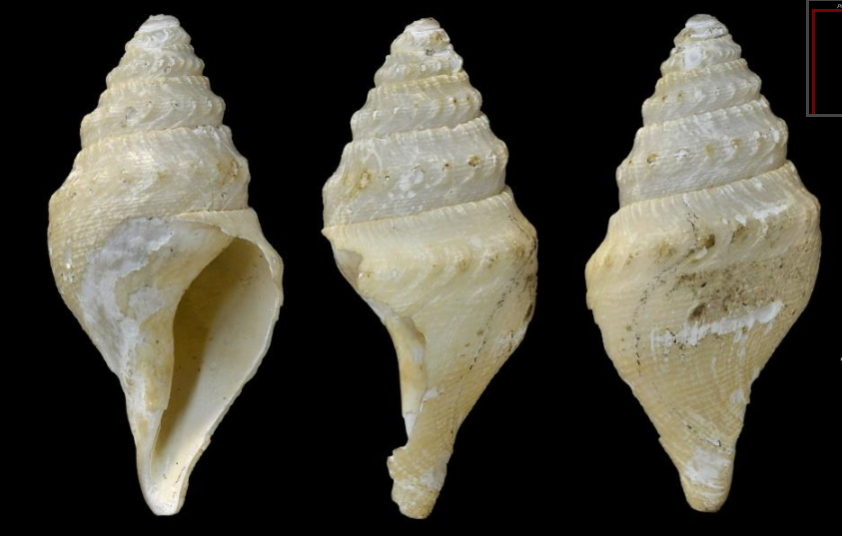
- Shell of Cryptogemma polystephanus (holotype at the Smithsonian Institution)

Scientific classification
- Kingdom: Animalia
- Phylum: Mollusca
- Class: Gastropoda
- Subclass: Caenogastropoda
- Order: Neogastropoda
- Superfamily: Conoidea
- Family: Turridae
- Genus: Cryptogemma
- Species: C. polystephanus

Binomial name
- Cryptogemma polystephanus (Dall, 1908)

Synonyms
- Pleurotomella (Pleurotomella) polystephanus Dall, 1908

= Cryptogemma polystephanus =

Species of gastropod

Cryptogemma polystephanus is a species of sea snail, a marine gastropod mollusk in the family Turridae, the turrids.

== Description ==
The length of the shell attains 25 mm.

(Original description) The shell of moderate size contains six or more whorls. The protoconch is eroded. The shell is white, with a cream-colored periostracum. The spiral sculpture consists numerous fine, subequal, flattish threads with narrower interspaces, which cover the whole shell. To these are added a thickened ridge which borders the anterior margin of the suture, and on the spire a peripheral nodose keel, which is less marked on the body whorl, where it forms the shoulder.oO the penultimate whorl there are twenty of these nodules. Other axial sculpture is furnished by line, short, sharp elevated wrinkles which cross retractively the ridge adjacent to the suture, like the "gathers" of a skirt, and become obsolete on the fasciole. There are twenty-eight of these wrinkles on the margin of the penultimate whorl. The space above the shoulder is distinctly excavated, especially on the spire. Theis suture distinct and, on the earlier whorls, almost Channelled. The aperture is ovate. The anal fasciole is comprised in the nodose shoulder, not reaching the suture. The outer lip is arcuately produced forward The columella show a thin, smooth layer of enamel, obliquely attenuated distally, somewhat twisted. The siphonal canal is wide and shallow.

== Distribution ==
This marine species was found off San Cristobal Island, Galapagos Islands, Ecuador, South Pacific Ocean at a depth of 1159 m.
