= Thielesyrinx =

Scientific classification
- Kingdom: Animalia
- Phylum: Mollusca
- Class: Gastropoda
- Subclass: Caenogastropoda
- Order: Neogastropoda
- Superfamily: Conoidea
- Family: Turridae
- Genus: Thielesyrinx; Kantor, Bouchet, Fedosov, Puillandre & Zaharias, 2024

Type species
- Ptychosyrinx chilensis S. S. Berry, 1968

Genus of gastropods

Thielesyrinx is a genus of sea snails, marine gastropod mollusks in the family Turridae, the turrids.

== Species ==
- Thielesyrinx chilensis (S. S. Berry, 1968)
