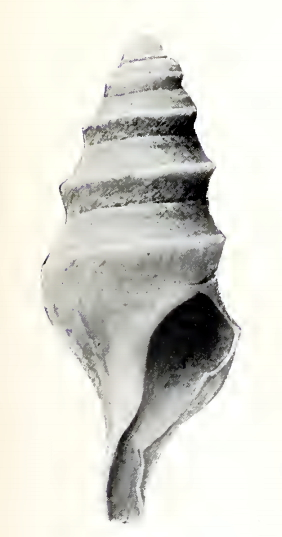
- Carinoturris polycaste

Scientific classification
- Kingdom: Animalia
- Phylum: Mollusca
- Class: Gastropoda
- Subclass: Caenogastropoda
- Order: Neogastropoda
- Superfamily: Conoidea
- Family: Pseudomelatomidae
- Genus: Carinoturris; Bartsch, 1944

Type species
- Cryptogemma adrastia Dall, 1919

Species
- See text

= Carinoturris =

Genus of gastropods

Carinoturris is a genus of sea snails, marine gastropod mollusks in the family Pseudomelatomidae, the turrids.

== Species ==
Species within the genus Carinoturris include:

- Carinoturris adrastia (Dall, 1919)
- Carinoturris fortis Bartsch, 1944
- Carinoturris polycaste (Dall, 1919)

Species brought into synonymy

- Carinoturris adestia Dall, 1919: synonym of Carinoturris adrastia (Dall, 1919)
