= Cryptogemma yokoyamai =

Scientific classification
- Kingdom: Animalia
- Phylum: Mollusca
- Class: Gastropoda
- Subclass: Caenogastropoda
- Order: Neogastropoda
- Superfamily: Conoidea
- Family: Turridae
- Genus: Cryptogemma
- Species: †C. yokoyamai

Binomial name
- †Cryptogemma yokoyamai K. Oyama in Taki & Oyama, 1954

Synonyms
- † Comitas yokoyamai K. Oyama, 1954

Extinct species of gastropod

Cryptogemma yokoyamai is an extinct species of sea snail, a marine gastropod mollusc in the family Turridae.

== Distribution ==
Fossils of this species were found in Cenozoic and Pliocene strata in Japan.
