= Cryptogemma cornea =

Scientific classification
- Kingdom: Animalia
- Phylum: Mollusca
- Class: Gastropoda
- Subclass: Caenogastropoda
- Order: Neogastropoda
- Superfamily: Conoidea
- Family: Turridae
- Genus: Cryptogemma
- Species: C. cornea

Binomial name
- Cryptogemma cornea (Okutani, 1966)

Synonyms
- Taranis corneus Okutani, 1966

Species of gastropod

Cryptogemma cornea is a species of sea snail, a marine gastropod mollusk in the family Turridae, the turrids.

== Description ==
The length of the shell varies between 15 mm and 20 mm.

== Distribution ==
This marine species occurs off the coast in Japan.
