= Cryptogemma tessellata =

Scientific classification
- Kingdom: Animalia
- Phylum: Mollusca
- Class: Gastropoda
- Subclass: Caenogastropoda
- Order: Neogastropoda
- Superfamily: Conoidea
- Family: Turridae
- Genus: Cryptogemma
- Species: C. tessellata

Binomial name
- Cryptogemma tessellata (Powell, 1967)

Synonyms
- Gemmula tessellata Powell, 1967 (original combination)

Species of gastropod

Cryptogemma tessellata is a species of sea snail, a marine gastropod mollusk in the family Turridae, the turrids.

== Distribution ==
This marine species occurs off Hawaii.
