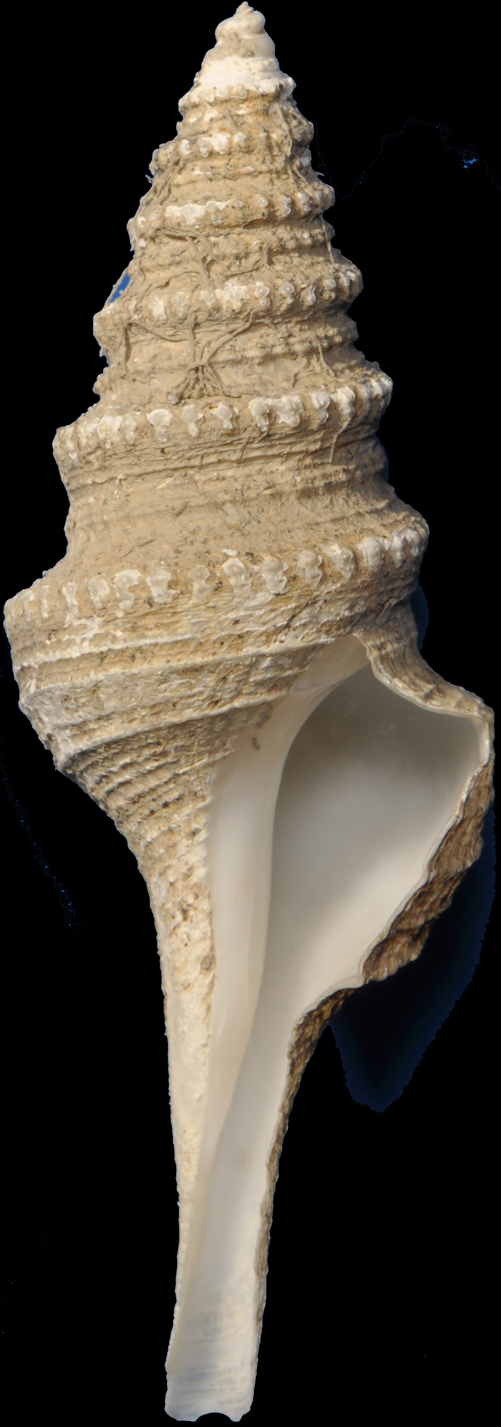

Scientific classification
- Kingdom: Animalia
- Phylum: Mollusca
- Class: Gastropoda
- Subclass: Caenogastropoda
- Order: Neogastropoda
- Superfamily: Conoidea
- Family: Turridae
- Genus: Cryptogemma
- Species: C. periscelida

Binomial name
- Cryptogemma periscelida (Dall, 1889)

Synonyms
- Gemmula periscelida (Dall, 1889); Pleurotoma periscelida Dall, 1889

= Cryptogemma periscelida =

Species of gastropod

Cryptogemma periscelida, common name the Atlantic gem turrid, is a species of sea snail, a marine gastropod mollusc in the family Turridae, the turrids.

== Description ==
The length of the shell varies between 25 mm and 50 mm.

(Original description by W.H. Dall) The stout shell has a fusiform shape. It is covered with a straw-colored epidermis. It is elaborately sculptured and contains 10 whorls, exclusive of the protoconch The spiral sculpture consists of:

- (1) a cord at first rounded and irregularly constricted at short intervals, later flattened with numerous transverse waves and indentations. This band becomes gradually wider, has two small grooves along its center, and at the sides, especially the sutural side, it overhangs the channels on each side of it. From the first this band conceals the suture, toward the end of the body whorl it becomes less prominent and descends slightly.
- (2) a broad elevated band grooved centrally and covered with twin nodules in pairs one above the other, which on the later whorls are somewhat reniform. This band represents the fasciole or pathway of the square-cut anal notch.
- (3) in the channel between the two last are two small, elevated, rounded nodulous cords.
- (4) in front of the fasciole and on the base of the body whorl are four or five strong spirals, and between these and in front of them on the siphonal canal are numerous smaller ones, all crossed and roughened by the transverse ridges of growth. One or two of these spirals are visible on the whorl before the last, the earlier ones not showing any of the basal spirals.

Transverse sculpture consists of coarse elevated incremental lines more or less visible over the whole shell. The aperture is rather wide The siphonal canal is narrow and slightly curved. The outer lip shows a deep notch squared at the bottom, then strongly arched forward, later contracted for the siphonal canal. The columellar margin is simple and sharp. The inner lip is white, smooth, simple and slightly excavated . Inside the outer lip are six or eight strong lirae falling short of the margin. The columella is nearly straight, attenuated and twisted in front, making the end of the siphonal canal flare a little. There is no umbilical trace.

This species is one of the most remarkable and elegant of any from the deeper waters. It belongs to the group of which Pleurotoma speciosa Reeve forms a member, by its sculpture, though whether the nucleus would agree with that species is uncertain. At present our judgment on such subdivisions as Gemmula Weinkauff, founded on nuclear characters, must be held suspended. So far as our knowledge goes, nuclear characters have little absolute systematic value in this group, and their relative value remains to be determined.

== Distribution ==
C. periscelida can be found in Atlantic waters, ranging from the coast of North Carolina south to Colombia.
