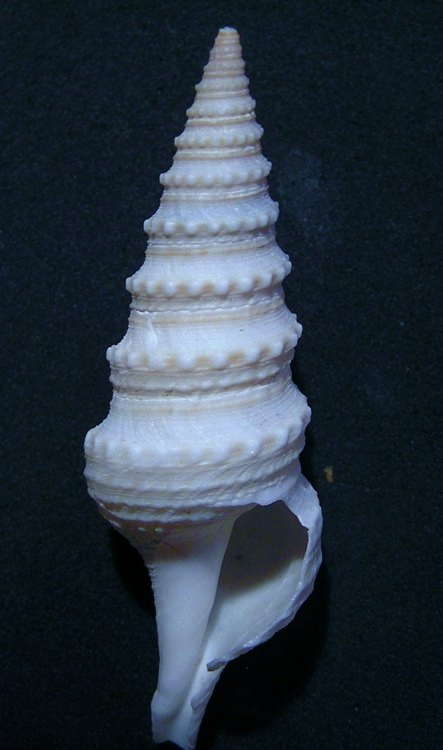
- Shell of Oliveragemmula vagata

Scientific classification
- Kingdom: Animalia
- Phylum: Mollusca
- Class: Gastropoda
- Subclass: Caenogastropoda
- Order: Neogastropoda
- Superfamily: Conoidea
- Family: Turridae
- Genus: Oliveragemmula
- Species: O. vagata

Binomial name
- Oliveragemmula vagata (E.A. Smith, 1895)

Synonyms
- Gemmula (Gemmula) vagata (E.A. Smith, 1895); Gemmula vagata (E. A. Smith, 1895) superseded combination; Pleurotoma vagata E.A. Smith, 1895

= Oliveragemmula vagata =

Species of gastropod

Oliveragemmula vagata is a species of sea snail, a marine gastropod mollusk in the family Turridae, the turrids.

== Description ==
The length of the shell varies between 60 mm and 65 mm.

The tall and narrow fusiform shell is white with the infrasutural keel somewhat reddish. The spire is elongate and acuminate with almost vertical sides. It contains 12 whorls, showing a moderately strong subsutural square-cut fold. The concave shoulder shows 5 to 9 spiral threads. It is strongly gemmate with about 24 gemmules on the penultimate whorl. The aperture with the siphonal canal measures almost half the total length. The interior of the aperture is white. The outer lip is narrow and slightly incised. The columella stands upright and is slightly askew. The siphonal canal is elongate, narrow and slightly recurved.

== Distribution ==
This species occurs in deep water in the Indian Ocean from Aden to Andaman Islands and off Sri Lanka
