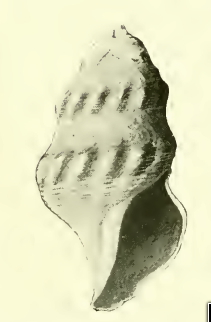
- Original image of a shell of Cryptogemma calypso

Scientific classification
- Kingdom: Animalia
- Phylum: Mollusca
- Class: Gastropoda
- Subclass: Caenogastropoda
- Order: Neogastropoda
- Superfamily: Conoidea
- Family: Turridae
- Genus: Cryptogemma
- Species: C. calypso

Binomial name
- Cryptogemma calypso Dall, 1919

= Cryptogemma calypso =

Species of gastropod

Cryptogemma calypso is a species of sea snail, a marine gastropod mollusk in the family Turridae, the turrids.

== Description ==
The (decollate) shell attains a length of 11 mm, its diameter 4.7 mm.

(Original description) The shell is small with the protoconch eroded. It is whitish with a dark dull olivaceous periostracum and about five remaining whorls. The suture is appressed, with a broad smooth ridge in front of it and behind the excavated anal fasciole. The spiral sculpture in front of the shoulder consists of fine, even close-set equal threads, covering the surface, including the siphonal canal. The axial sculpture consists of feeble incremental lines arcuate on the fasciole and the antesutural ridge, also of narrow low sigmoid ribs beginning and forming a shoulder in front of the fasciole and obsolete in front of the periphery, differing in strength in different individuals and averaging fourteen on the body whorl. The anal sulcus is wide and deep, rounded The outer lip is thin and sharp and much produced. The inner lip shows a thin layer of callus. The columella is straight, short and obliquely attenuated in front. The axis is impervious. The siphonal canal is distinct, wide and hardly recurved.

== Distribution ==
This marine species occurs off San Diego, California, US.
