= Cryptogemma japonica =

Scientific classification
- Kingdom: Animalia
- Phylum: Mollusca
- Class: Gastropoda
- Subclass: Caenogastropoda
- Order: Neogastropoda
- Family: Turridae
- Genus: Cryptogemma
- Species: C. japonica

Binomial name
- Cryptogemma japonica (Okutani, 1964)

Species of gastropod

Cryptogemma japonica is a species of sea snail, a marine gastropod mollusk in the family Turridae.

== Distribution ==
This marine species occurs off Japan.
