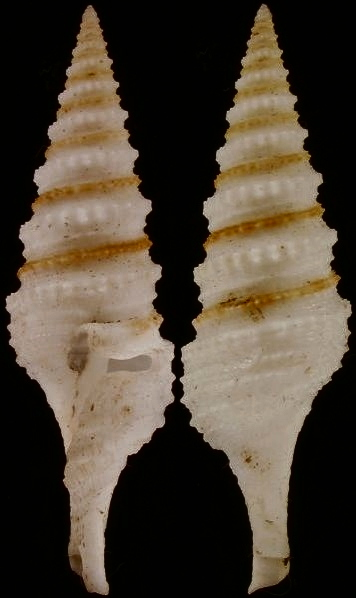
- Shell of Oliveragemmula dampierana

Scientific classification
- Kingdom: Animalia
- Phylum: Mollusca
- Class: Gastropoda
- Subclass: Caenogastropoda
- Order: Neogastropoda
- Superfamily: Conoidea
- Family: Turridae
- Genus: Oliveragemmula
- Species: O. dampierana

Binomial name
- Oliveragemmula dampierana Powell, 1964

Synonyms
- Gemmula dampierana A. W. B. Powell, 1964 superseded combination

= Oliveragemmula dampierana =

Species of gastropod

Oliveragemmula damperierana is a species of sea snail, a marine gastropod mollusk in the family Turridae, the turrids.

== Description ==
The length of the shell varies between 14 mm and 35 mm.

== Distribution ==
This marine species occurs off Western Australia, the Philippines and in the South China Sea.
