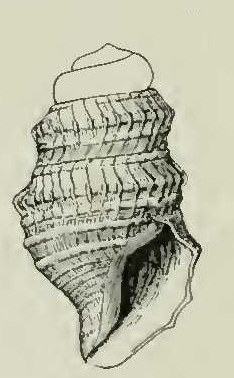
- Drawing of a shell of Cryptogemma eldorana

Scientific classification
- Kingdom: Animalia
- Phylum: Mollusca
- Class: Gastropoda
- Subclass: Caenogastropoda
- Order: Neogastropoda
- Superfamily: Conoidea
- Family: Turridae
- Genus: Cryptogemma
- Species: C. eldorana

Binomial name
- Cryptogemma eldorana (Dall, 1908)

Synonyms
- Gemmula eldorana Dall, 1908

= Cryptogemma eldorana =

Species of gastropod

Cryptogemma eldorana is a species of sea snail, a marine gastropod mollusk in the family Turridae, the turrids.

== Description ==
The length of three whorls attains 8 mm; of the body whorl, 6 mm; of the aperture, 4 mm; maximum diameter 5 mm.

(Original description) The small, solid, chalky shell has an olivaceous periostracum. It is decollate with about 4½ remaining whorls. The suture is obscure, with a narrow slightly elevated band in front of it, and on the body whorl a gradually developing similar band behind it. In front of the first band is a depression with two or three incised spiral lines, followed by a strong nodulous keel corresponding to the anal fasciole, in front of which again are (on the spire one, on the last whorl four) strong, simple, distant, spiral threads, of which the second is strongest and followed by the widest interval. The series is preceded by eight or ten smaller, closer, simple, spiral threads which extend to the end of the siphonal canal. The axial sculpture consists of incremental lines and on the earlier whorls obscure wrinkles connected with the nodules on the keel, which number on the penultimate whorl about twenty-four and on the body whorl become obsolescent. The aperture is short and lunate. The outer lip is sharp, with a well marked sulcus at the principal keel. The sculpture of the body is erased. The columella is very short, twisted and obliquely truncate in front. The axis is not pervious. The siphonal canal short, recurved, with flaring edges. The operculum is small, narrow, pale brown with an apical nucleus.

== Distribution ==
This marine species occurs in the Gulf of Panama and off the Galapagos Islands.
