= Oliveragemmula subfenestrata =

Scientific classification
- Kingdom: Animalia
- Phylum: Mollusca
- Class: Gastropoda
- Subclass: Caenogastropoda
- Order: Neogastropoda
- Superfamily: Conoidea
- Family: Turridae
- Genus: Oliveragemmula
- Species: O. subfenestrata

Binomial name
- Oliveragemmula subfenestrata Kosuge, 1990

Synonyms
- Gemmula subfenestrata Kosuge, 1990 superseded combination

Species of gastropod

Oliveragemmula subfenestrata is a species of sea snail, a marine gastropod mollusk in the family Turridae, the turrids.

== Distribution ==
This marine species is endemic to Australia and occurs off Western Australia.
