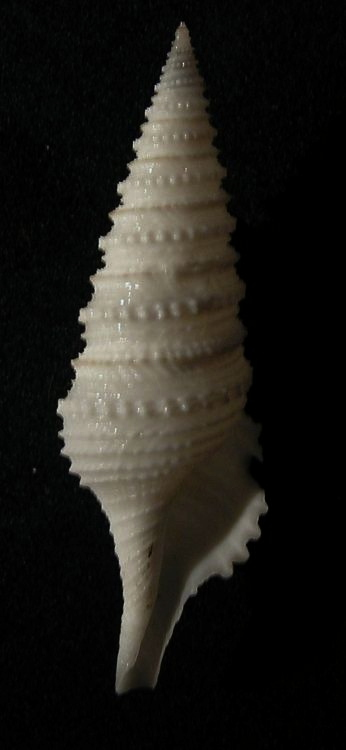
- Shell of Oliveragemmula sogodensis

Scientific classification
- Kingdom: Animalia
- Phylum: Mollusca
- Class: Gastropoda
- Subclass: Caenogastropoda
- Order: Neogastropoda
- Superfamily: Conoidea
- Family: Turridae
- Genus: Oliveragemmula
- Species: O. sogodensis

Binomial name
- Oliveragemmula sogodensis (B. M. Olivera, 2004)

Synonyms
- Gemmula sogodensis B. M. Olivera, 2005 superseded combination

= Oliveragemmula sogodensis =

Species of gastropod

Oliveragemmula sogodensis is a species of sea snail, a marine gastropod mollusk in the family Turridae, the turrids.

== Description ==
The length of the shell varies between 35 mm and 50 mm.

== Distribution ==
This marine species occurs off the Philippines.
