= Cryptogemma longicostata =

Scientific classification
- Kingdom: Animalia
- Phylum: Mollusca
- Class: Gastropoda
- Subclass: Caenogastropoda
- Order: Neogastropoda
- Superfamily: Conoidea
- Family: Turridae
- Genus: Cryptogemma
- Species: C. longicostata

Binomial name
- Cryptogemma longicostata Sysoev & Kantor, 1986

Species of gastropod

Cryptogemma longicostata is a species of sea snail, a marine gastropod mollusk in the family Turridae, the turrids.

== Distribution ==
This species was found on the Kuril–Kamchatka Trench, Northern Pacific.
