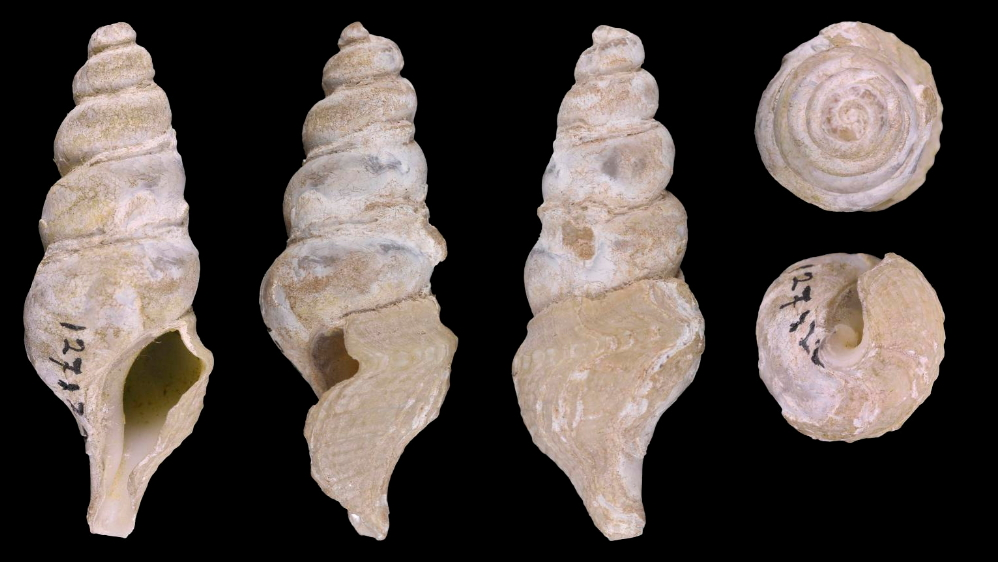
- Shell and protoconch of Cryptogemma praesignis (holotype of Pleurotoma (Drillia) microscelida at the Smithsonian Institution)

Scientific classification
- Kingdom: Animalia
- Phylum: Mollusca
- Class: Gastropoda
- Subclass: Caenogastropoda
- Order: Neogastropoda
- Superfamily: Conoidea
- Family: Turridae
- Genus: Cryptogemma
- Species: C. praesignis

Binomial name
- Cryptogemma praesignis (E.A. Smith, 1895)

Synonyms
- Drillia microscelida W.H. Dall, 1895; Gemmula (Ptychosyrinx) lordhoweensis Kantor & Sysoev, 1991; Gemmula bisinuata (Martens, 1901); Gemmula microscelida (Dall, 1895); Gemmula praesignis (E. A. Smith, 1895); Gemmula rotatilis (Martens, 1902); Pleurotoma (Drillia) microscelida Dall, 1895; Pleurotoma (Gemmula) rotatilis von Martens, 1902; Pleurotoma (Subulata) bisinuata von Martens, 1901; Pleurotoma (Surcula) lobata G. B. Sowerby III, 1903; Pleurotoma praesignis E. A. Smith, 1895 (original combination); Ptychosyrinx bisinuata (Martens, 1901); Ptychosyrinx bisinuata japonica Okutani, 1964; Ptychosyrinx lobata (G. B. Sowerby III, 1903); Ptychosyrinx lordhoweensis (Kantor & Sysoev, 1991); Turris lobata (G. B. Sowerby III, 1903)

= Cryptogemma praesignis =

Species of gastropod

Cryptogemma praesignis is a species of sea snail, a marine gastropod mollusk in the family Turridae, the turrids.

== Description ==
The length of the shell attains 42 mm, its diameter 15 mm.

(Original description by E.A. Smith) The prominent row of tubercles around the middle of the whorls, the keel beneath the suture, and the broad sinus in the outer lip are the principal features of this species. The apex of the spire being broken away makes it impossible to state with certainty the exact number of whorls, but they would probably amount to eleven or twelve. The entire surface exhibits fine flexuous lines of growth.

(Original description by W.H. Dall) The solid shell contains six or more whorls (all the specimens are decollate). It is white, with an ashy pale-brown epidermis. The aperture measures less than half the length of the shell. The suture is distinct, not channeled The anal notch is rather anterior, about as deep as wide, separated from the suture behind by a somewhat excavated area. The spiral sculpture consists of, in front of the suture, a plain, strong thread, in front of that three or four anteriorly diminishing threads. The anal fasciole, contrary to the ordinary rule, projects, showing two small distinct adjacent threads, which overrun and somewhat undulate numerous short abrupt peripheral wavelets. In front of the fasciole three strong alternate with three feeble revolving threads, and still in front of these six or eight small threads occupy the base. The siphonal part is decorticated. The transverse sculpture is composed of the peripheral wavelets before alluded to, which are rather close set and about 21 in number, on the penultimate whorl. There is no other transverse sculpture except lines of growth, which are not very prominent. The aperture is narrow, with a relatively wide siphonal canal. The columella is solid, slender, and somewhat twisted. The body is not callous, and has no subsutural callosity. The interior of the aperture is not lirate.

== Distribution ==
This marine species occurs off Hawaii and Sri Lanka. It has been spotted in the middle of the Pacific near the coast of Chile, Eastern Australia, Eastern South Africa, Japan, Hong Kong, the Philippines and Papua New Guinea. It lives exclusively in water.

It's known tolerated conditions are living in 15-25 Cº and in a depth from 200 to 900 meters.

One of the first spottings was in the Bay of Bengal and the Arabian Sea in 1893-94

== Curiosities ==
E.A. Smith named it originally Pleurotoma praesignis

There is an example in the archives of the Natural History Museum of France.

There's also one in the Australian Museum Matacology Collection.
