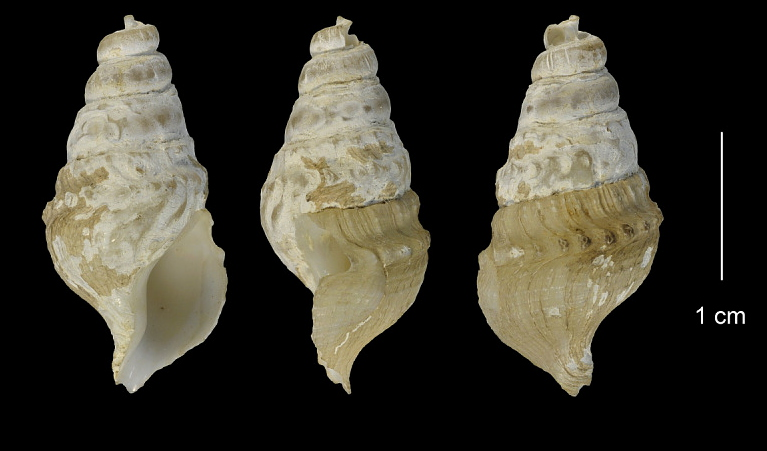
- shell of Cryptogemma phymatias (holotype at the Smithsonian Institution)

Scientific classification
- Kingdom: Animalia
- Phylum: Mollusca
- Class: Gastropoda
- Subclass: Caenogastropoda
- Order: Neogastropoda
- Superfamily: Conoidea
- Family: Turridae
- Genus: Cryptogemma
- Species: C. phymatias

Binomial name
- Cryptogemma phymatias (Watson, 1886)

Synonyms
- Bathybermudia carynae F. Haas, 1949; Cryptogemma benthima (Dall, 1908); Gemmula benthima Dall, 1908; Gemmula truncata (Schepman, 1913); Pleurotoma (Gemmula) truncata Schepman, 1913; Pleurotoma phymatias R. B. Watson, 1886 (original combination); Ptychosyrinx carynae (F. Haas, 1949)

= Cryptogemma phymatias =

Species of gastropod

Cryptogemma phymatias is a species of sea snail, a marine gastropod mollusk in the family Turridae, the turrids.

== Description ==
(Original description) The white rather high and narrow shell is thin. It is angulated and tubercled on the angle, spiralled, with a short round base, small snout, and openly constricted suture.

Sculpture : Longitudinals—there are only harsh, irregular, unequal lines of growth. Spirals — the shell is rather broadly carinated in the middle of the whorls by three fine threads, which are united and made prominent by a series of narrow elongated tubercles. This is where the apex of the sinus occurs.

The whole base and snout are scored with feeble threads, one of which, about half-way down the base, is a little more prominent than the rest. The shoulder of the shell above the keel has also some spiral threads, of which the one nearest the suture is also studded with small tubercles.

The colour of the shell is greyish yellow.

The spire is high and conical. Its profile lines are cut into zigzags by the projecting keels of the successive whorls and the contracted sutures between. The apex is broken. Only 5¼ whorls remain. They are of slow increase, are biconical, contracting (with a straight outline) from the keel into the suture both above and below. The body whorl is short, with a slightly tumid rounded base contracting into a small equal-sided snout. The suture is very distinct, being contracted, impressed, and submarginated below. It is a little oblique. The aperture is pear-shaped, sharply pointed above and below. The outer lip is very thin, with a very deep open U-shaped sinus, which is separated from the suture by a large broad triangular shelf. The edge of the shell sweeps very far forward from the sinus and then advances straight down the siphonal canal. The inner lip has a thin glaze on the body. Its line is concave above, then straight down the columella, the point of which is cut off to the left and very much twisted at the point, leaving the short narrow oblique siphonal canal very open.

== Distribution ==
This marine species occurs off the Philippines.
