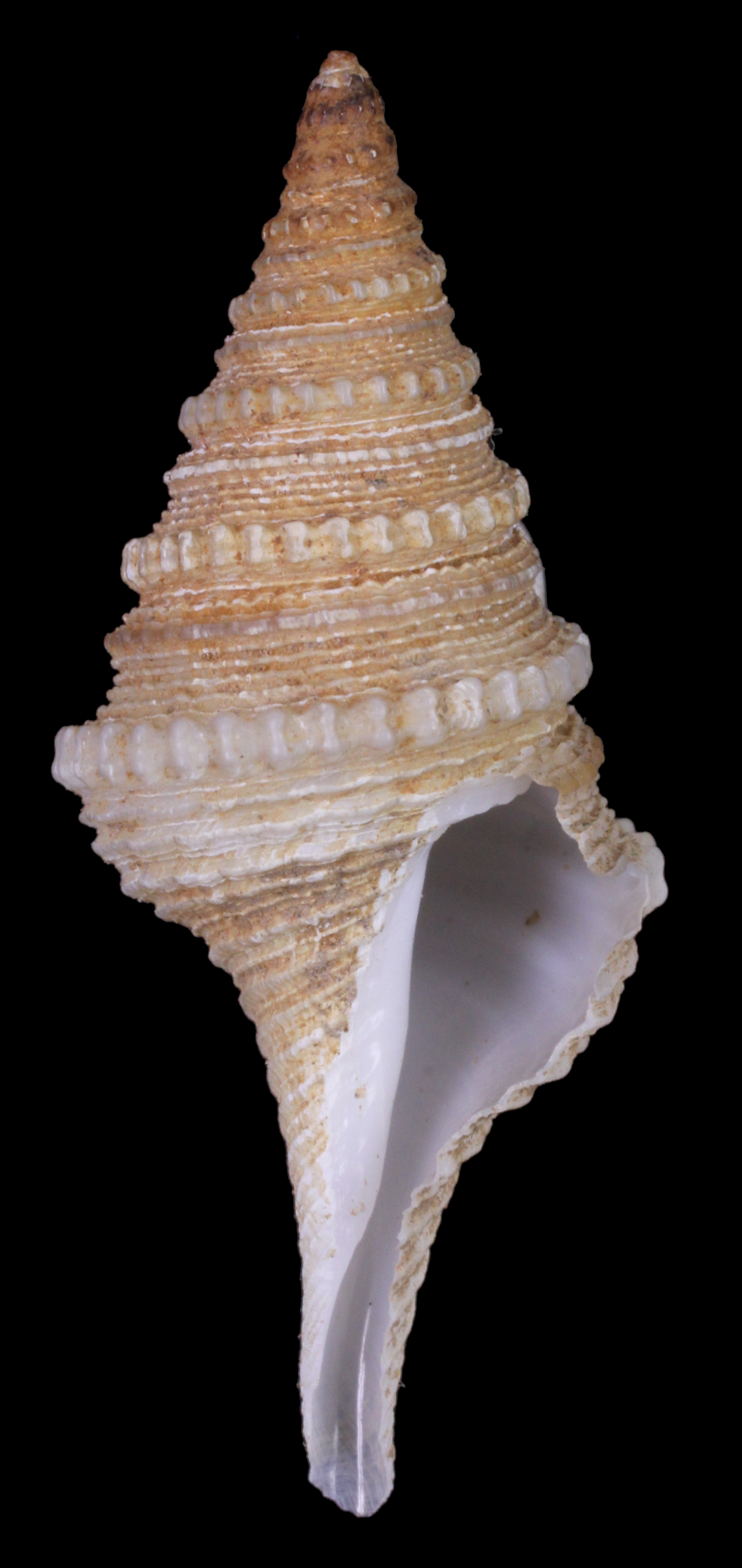
- Shell of Oliveragemmula cosmoi (specimen at MNHN, Paris)

Scientific classification
- Kingdom: Animalia
- Phylum: Mollusca
- Class: Gastropoda
- Subclass: Caenogastropoda
- Order: Neogastropoda
- Superfamily: Conoidea
- Family: Turridae
- Genus: Oliveragemmula
- Species: O. cosmoi

Binomial name
- Oliveragemmula cosmoi (Sykes, 1930)

Synonyms
- Gemmula congener cosmoi (Sykes, 1930); Gemmula (Gemmula) cosmoi (Sykes, 1930); Gemmula cosmoi (Sykes, 1930) superseded combination; Turris cosmoi Sykes, 1930

= Oliveragemmula cosmoi =

Species of gastropod

Oliveragemmula cosmoi is a species of sea snail, a marine gastropod mollusk in the family Turridae, the turrids.

== Description ==
The length of the shell varies between 45 mm and 60 mm.

An almost uncolored to slightly brown shell. It shows a row of tiny nodules on the keel of the whorls. The suture has a row of pointed nodules.

== Distribution ==
This marine species occurs from East Africa to Japan; in the East China Sea, South China Sea and Nansha Islands; off the Philippines.
