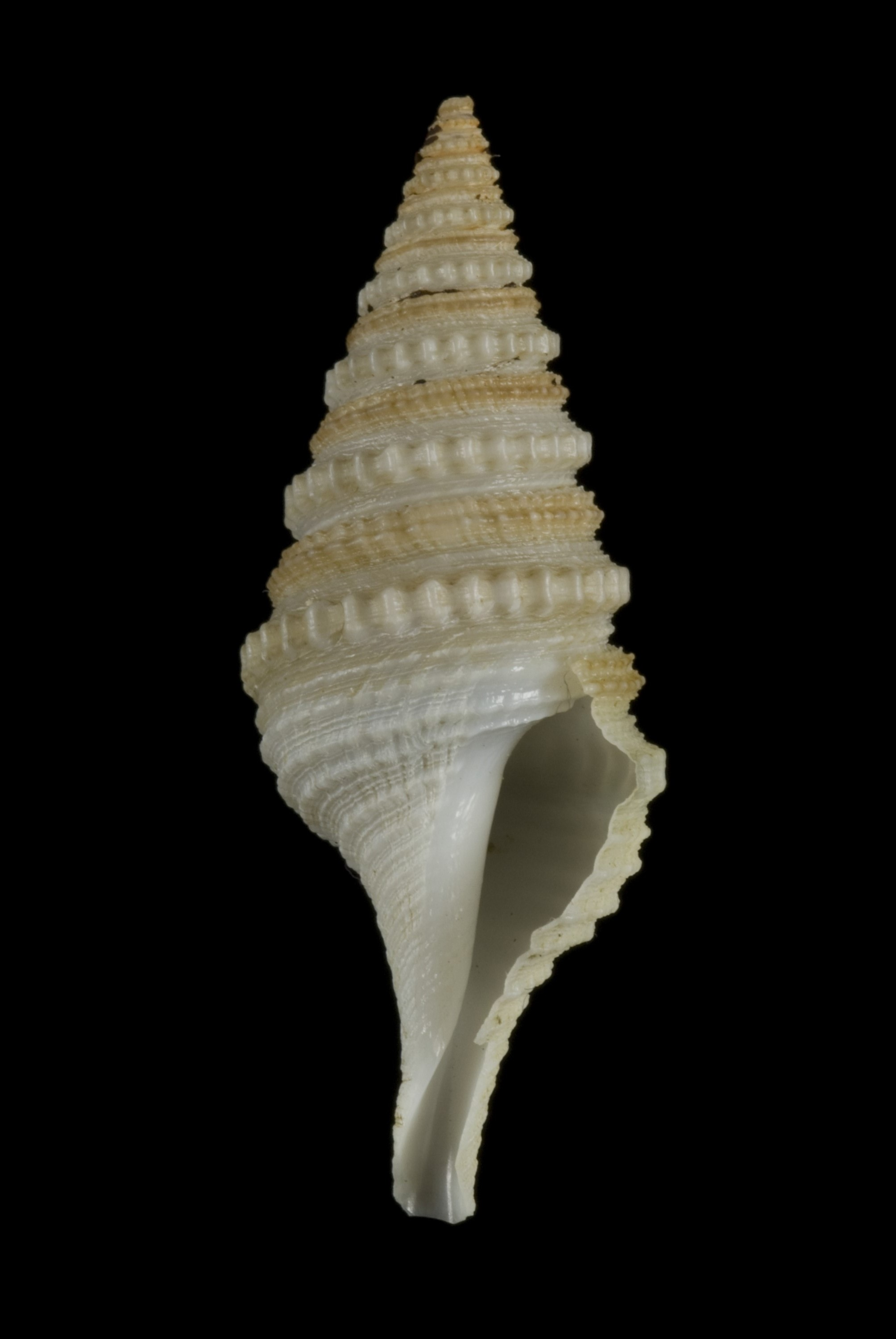
- Shell of Oliveragemmula diomedea (specimen at MNHN, Paris)

Scientific classification
- Kingdom: Animalia
- Phylum: Mollusca
- Class: Gastropoda
- Subclass: Caenogastropoda
- Order: Neogastropoda
- Superfamily: Conoidea
- Family: Turridae
- Genus: Oliveragemmula
- Species: O. diomedea

Binomial name
- Oliveragemmula diomedea (A.W.B. Powell, 1964)

Synonyms
- Gemmula congener diomedea Powell, 1964 superseded combination; Gemmula (Gemmula) diomedea Powell, 1964 superseded combination

= Oliveragemmula diomedea =

Species of gastropod

Oliveragemmula diomedea, common name the albatross turrid, is a species of sea snail, a marine gastropod mollusk in the family Turridae, the turrids. It was originally described in The family Turridae in the Indo-Pacific. Part 1. The subfamily Turrinae by Arthur William Baden Powell in 1964.

== Taxonomy ==
According to Wilson, 1994 A.W.B. Powell, 1966 described it as a subspecies of Gemmula (Gemmula) congener diomedea but the two forms occur in the same areas and full species rank is accorded to Oliveragemmula diomedea.

== Description ==
In adults, the height of the shell varies from 63 to 88 mm. The shell is elongate-fusiform and contains a spire and a flexed anterior canal. It has 9 adule whorl, each of which are angled around the middle whorl height by a broad, square-cut peripheral carina which are studded with vertically fused gemmules. The subsutural fold consists of two gemmate cords. The shoulder is concave with 3-5 threads. There are 2 primary cords between the peripheral carina and the lower shell structure with 2-3 weaker threads in the interspaces. The body whorl (including siphonal canal and anterior canals) have many primary cords and intermediate threads. The upper part of the base has four spiral cords are much stronger than the rest of the cords and in some cases they are developed into large, meandering folds that laciniate the margin of the outer lip. The shell has a spiral structure which renders all of the cords gemmate or crenulate. The color is white except for a subsutural band of light brown which covers both subsutural cords.

== Distribution ==
Oliveragemmula diomedea has been recorded of the coast of the Philippines, in the Bismarck Sea, off the coast of western Australia, and off the coast of Taiwan.
