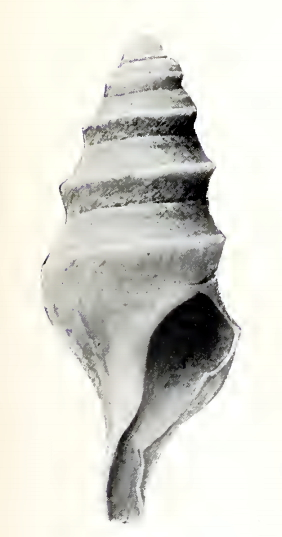
- Original image of a shell of Carinoturris polycaste

Scientific classification
- Kingdom: Animalia
- Phylum: Mollusca
- Class: Gastropoda
- Subclass: Caenogastropoda
- Order: Neogastropoda
- Superfamily: Conoidea
- Family: Pseudomelatomidae
- Genus: Carinoturris
- Species: C. polycaste

Binomial name
- Carinoturris polycaste (Dall, 1919)

Synonyms
- Cryptogemma polycaste Dall, 1919 (basionym)

= Carinoturris polycaste =

Species of gastropod

Carinoturris polycaste is a species of sea snail, a marine gastropod mollusk in the family Pseudomelatomidae, the turrids and allies.

== Description ==
The length of the shell attains 14 mm, its diameter 5.5 mm.

(Original description) The white shell has a pale olivaceous periostracum. It contains five whorls exclusive of the (lost) protoconch. These are rather slender and moderately rounded except for a single strong peripheral keel which marks the deepest part of the anal sulcus. The suture is distinct, not appressed, with a feebly indicated flattish area between it and the posterior edge of the anal fasciole, which between the keel and the flattening is slightly impressed. There is no other spiral sculpture and the axial sculpture consists mostly of moderately prominent incremental lines. The anal sulcus is deep and wide. The outer lip is thin, prominently arcuately produced. The inner lip is smooth. The columella is very short and gyrate. The axis is pervious. The siphonal canal is produced, narrow and slightly recurved.

== Distribution ==
This marine species was found off Tillamook Bay, Oregon, United States.
