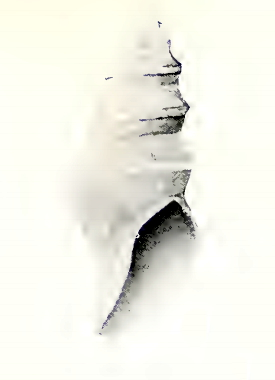
- Original image of a shell of Carinoturris adrastia

Scientific classification
- Kingdom: Animalia
- Phylum: Mollusca
- Class: Gastropoda
- Subclass: Caenogastropoda
- Order: Neogastropoda
- Superfamily: Conoidea
- Family: Pseudomelatomidae
- Genus: Carinoturris
- Species: C. adrastia

Binomial name
- Carinoturris adrastia (Dall, 1919)

Synonyms
- Carinoturris adestia Dall, 1919; Cryptogemma adrastia Dall, 1919 (basionym); Spirotropis adrastia (Dall, 1919)

= Carinoturris adrastia =

Species of gastropod

Carinoturris adrastia is a species of sea snail, a marine gastropod mollusk in the family Pseudomelatomidae, the turrids and allies.

== Description ==
The length of the decollate holotype attains 16 cm, its diameter 6.25 mm.

(Original description) The white shell has a thin, pale olive periostracum. The apex is invariably eroded, and the subsequent whorls, eight or more, are polished and faintly showing incremental lines. The suture is inconspicuous, the anterior margin is sometimes raised like a small cord. The spiral sculpture consists of a strong, sometimes nodulous or undulated peripheral keel, rather nearer the succeeding suture than to the preceding one, the latter space occupied by the slightly concave anal fasciole. The axial sculpture consists only of arcuate incremental lines. The base of the shell is rounded;. The aperture is narrow. The outer lip is thin, sharp, produced and internally smooth. The anal sulcus is wide and shallow, with no parietal nodule. The inner lip is erased. The columella is smooth, twisted, impervious, attenuated obliquely toward the rather long, slightly recurved siphonal canal.

== Distribution ==
The holotype of this marine species was found off Monterey Bay, California, United States.
