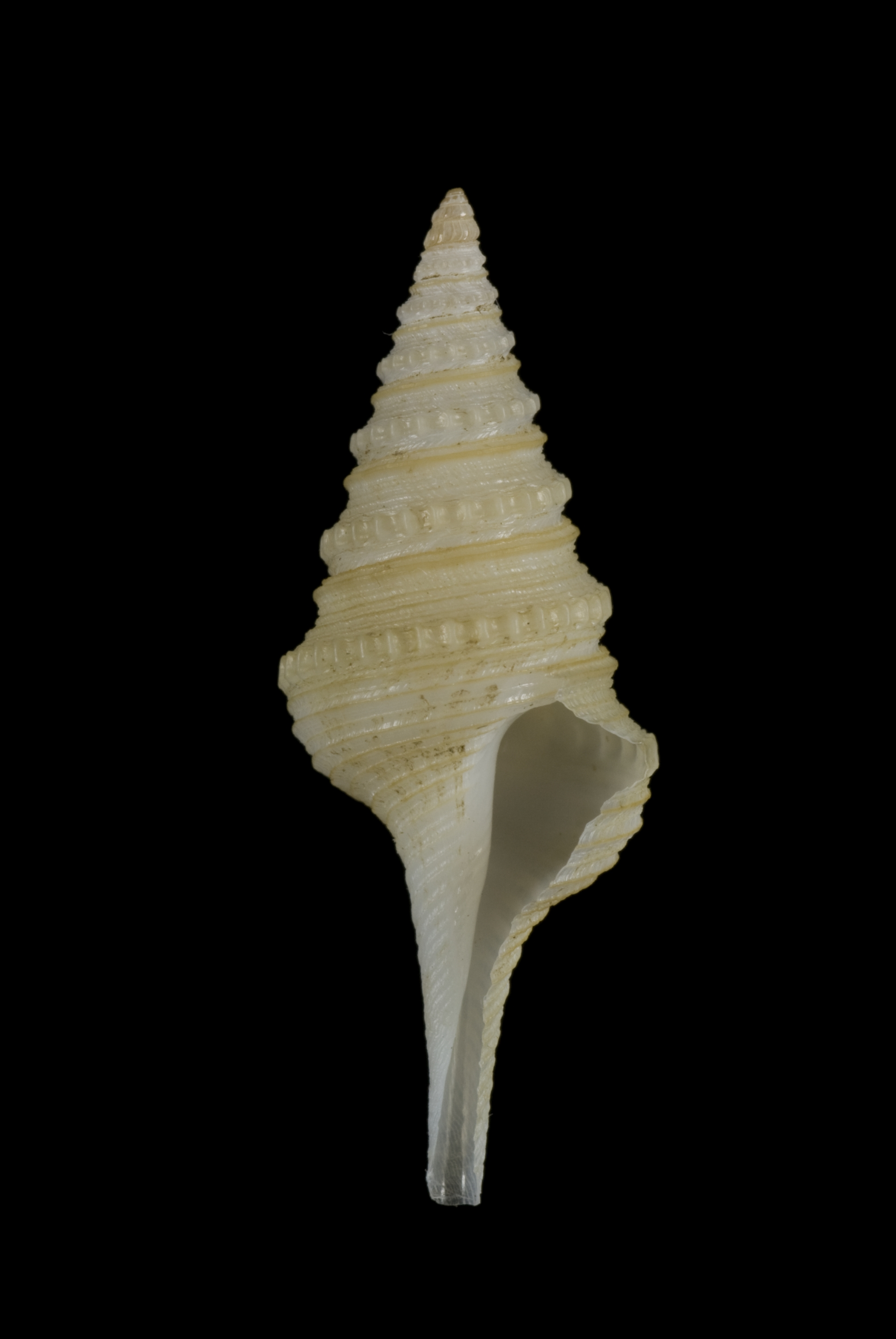
- Shell of Oliveragemmula speciosa (specimen at MNHN, Paris)

Scientific classification
- Kingdom: Animalia
- Phylum: Mollusca
- Class: Gastropoda
- Subclass: Caenogastropoda
- Order: Neogastropoda
- Superfamily: Conoidea
- Family: Turridae
- Genus: Oliveragemmula
- Species: O. speciosa

Binomial name
- Oliveragemmula speciosa (Reeve, 1842)

Synonyms
- Gemmula speciosa (Reeve, 1842) superseded combination; Pleurotoma speciosa Reeve, 1842; Pleurotoma (Gemmula) speciosa Reeve, 1842; Turris (Gemmula) granosa var. guadurensis Melvill 1917

= Oliveragemmula speciosa =

Species of gastropod

Oliveragemmula speciosa, common name the splendid turrid, is a species of sea snail, a marine gastropod mollusk in the family Turridae, the turrids.

== Description ==
The length of the shell varies between 40 mm and 80 mm.

The shell is crenulately carinate or ribbed. The principal keel, forming the angle of the whorls, is broad and corded, with a sloping shoulder above it and studded with raised granules. The shell is yellowish white, the ribs ochraceous. The peripheral keel and the primary spiral cords show light-brown continuous lines.

== Distribution ==
This marine species occurs in the Indo-West Pacific; in the South China Sea, Nansha Islands; Arabian Sea, Japan, the Philippines; off Papua New Guinea.
