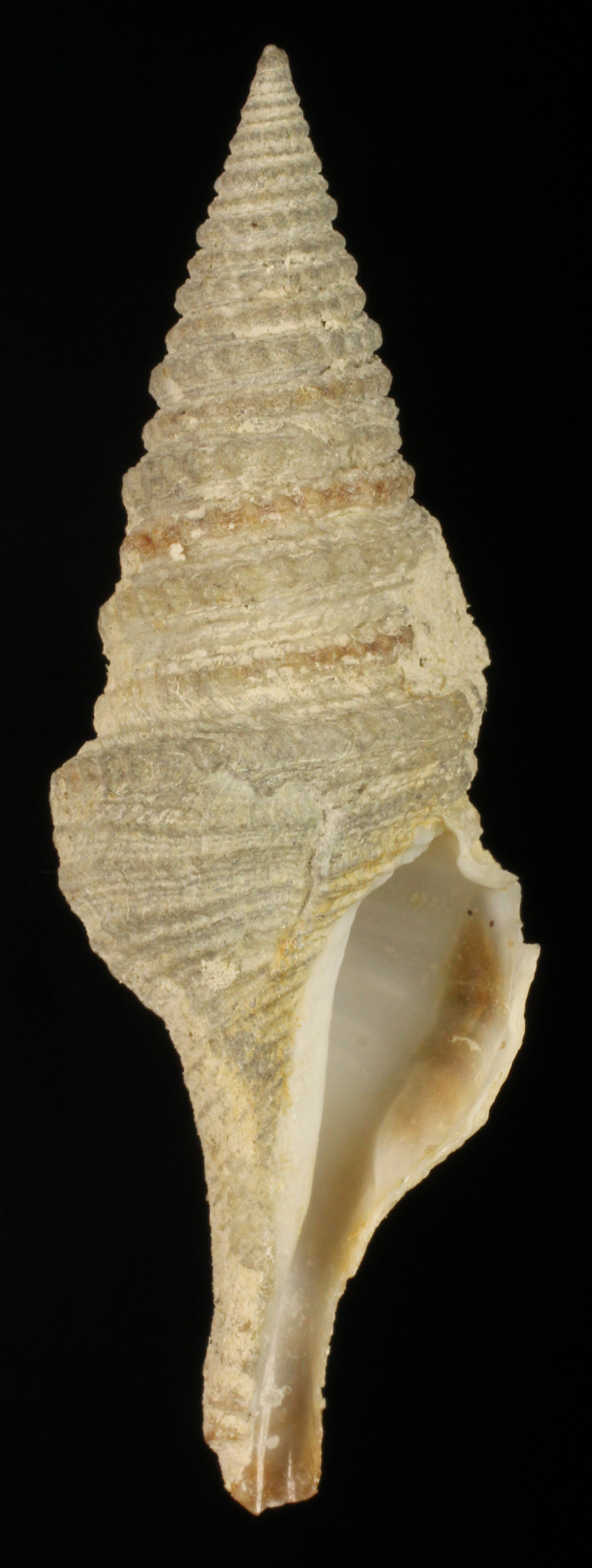
- Shell of Gemmula unilineata (specimen at MNHN, Paris)

Scientific classification
- Kingdom: Animalia
- Phylum: Mollusca
- Class: Gastropoda
- Subclass: Caenogastropoda
- Order: Neogastropoda
- Superfamily: Conoidea
- Family: Turridae
- Genus: Cryptogemma
- Species: C. unilineata

Binomial name
- Cryptogemma unilineata (Powell, 1967)

Synonyms
- Gemmula congener unilineata Powell, 1967 (basionym); Gemmula unilineata Powell, 1967 (original combination)

= Cryptogemma unilineata =

Species of gastropod

Cryptogemma unilineata is a species of sea snail, a marine gastropod mollusk in the family Turridae, the turrids.

== Distribution ==
This marine species occurs off Hawaii and Réunion; also in the South China Sea.
