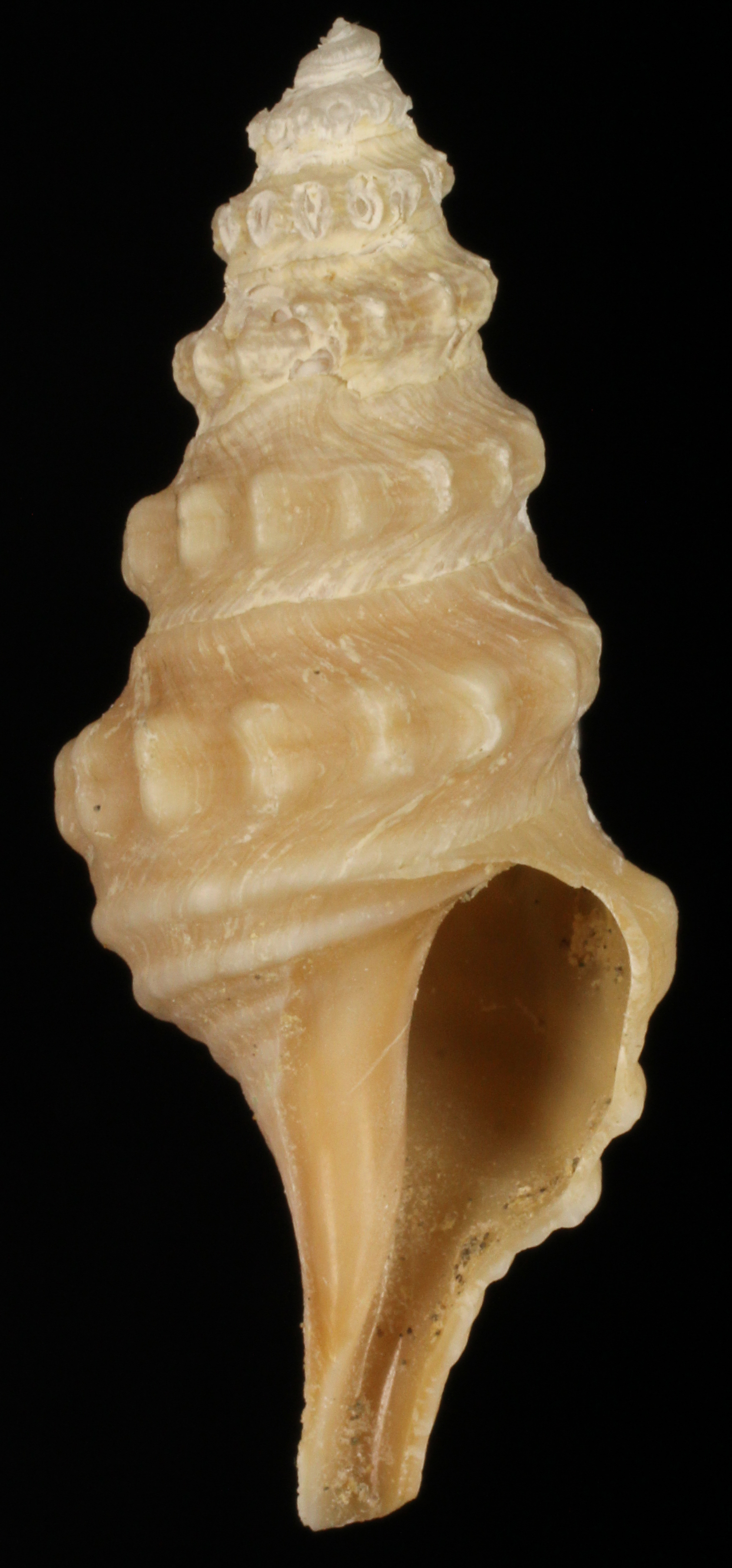
- Shell of Thielesyrinx chilensis (specimen at MNHN, Paris)

Scientific classification
- Kingdom: Animalia
- Phylum: Mollusca
- Class: Gastropoda
- Subclass: Caenogastropoda
- Order: Neogastropoda
- Superfamily: Conoidea
- Family: Turridae
- Genus: Thielesyrinx
- Species: T. chilensis

Binomial name
- Thielesyrinx chilensis (S.S. Berry, 1968)

Synonyms
- Cryptogemma chilensis (S. S. Berry, 1968) superseded combination; Ptychosyrinx chilensis Berry, 1968 (original combination)

= Thielesyrinx chilensis =

Species of gastropod

Thielesyrinx chilensis is a species of sea snail, a marine gastropod mollusk in the family Turridae, the turrids.

== Distribution ==
This marine species occurs off Chile.
