= Zegalerus =

Scientific classification
- Kingdom: Animalia
- Phylum: Mollusca
- Class: Gastropoda
- Subclass: Caenogastropoda
- Order: Littorinimorpha
- Family: Calyptraeidae
- Genus: Zegalerus; Finlay, 1927

Species
- See text

Genus of gastropods

Zegalerus is a genus of small to medium-sized sea snails, marine gastropod molluscs in the family Calyptraeidae, commonly known as slipper snails, cup-and-saucer shells, and Chinese hat shells.

This genus has been declared a synonym of the genus Sigapatella Lesson, 1831

== Species ==
Species within the genus Zegalerus include:

- Zegalerus coniculus

Species brought into synonymy

- Zegalerus crater Finlay, 1927; synonym of Sigapatella novaezelandiae Lesson, 1830
- † Zegalerus giganteus Beu, 1970: synonym of † Sigapatella gigantea (Beu, 1970)
- † Zegalerus peramplus: synonym of †Sigapatella perampla (Powell & Bartrum, 1929)
- Zegalerus terraenovae (Peile, 1924): synonym of Sigapatella terraenovae (Peile, 1924)
- Zegalerus tenuis (Gray, 1867): synonym of Sigapatella tenuis (Gray, 1867)

Species inquirenda

- Zegalerus tumens Finlay, 1930: synonym of Sigapatella terraenovae Peile, 1924
