= C. tenuis =

C. tenuis may refer to:

- Cattleya tenuis, the slender-stemmed cattleya, an orchid species
- Clypeola tenuis, a gastropod species
- Cystopteris tenuis, the Mackay's bladder fern or Mackay's fragile fern, a fern species found in the northeastern United States

== See also ==
- Tenuis (disambiguation)
