= Clypeola (gastropod) =

Scientific classification
- Kingdom: Animalia
- Phylum: Mollusca
- Class: Gastropoda
- Subclass: Caenogastropoda
- Order: Littorinimorpha
- Family: Calyptraeidae
- Genus: Clypeola; J.E. Gray, 1868

Type species
- Clypeola tenuis Gray 1867

Species
- See text

Synonyms
- Zegalerus Finlay, 1926

Genus of gastropods

Clypeola is a genus of sea snails, marine gastropod mollusks in the family Calyptraeidae, the slipper snails, Chinese hat snails and cup-and-saucer snails.

This genus is considered a synonym of Sigapatella Lesson, 1831

== Species ==
Species within the genus Clypeola include:

- Clypeola hedleyi (Smith, 1915): synonym of Sigapatella hedleyi (Smith, 1915)
- Clypeola tenuis Gray 1867 - New Zealand : synonym of Sigapatella tenuis (Gray, 1867)
