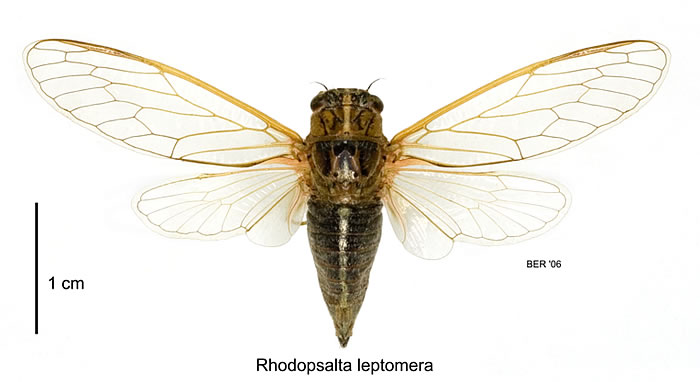
- Female
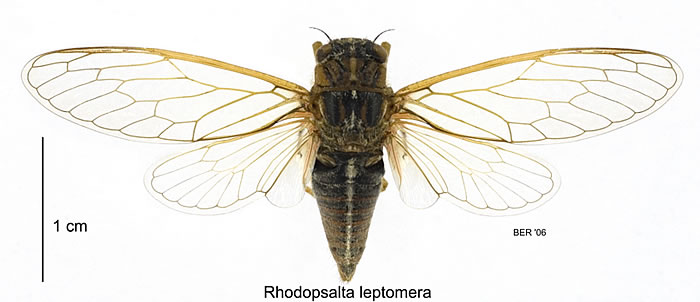
- Male

Scientific classification
- Kingdom: Animalia
- Phylum: Arthropoda
- Clade: Pancrustacea
- Class: Insecta
- Order: Hemiptera
- Suborder: Auchenorrhyncha
- Family: Cicadidae
- Genus: Rhodopsalta
- Species: R. leptomera

Binomial name
- Rhodopsalta leptomera (Myers, 1921)

Synonyms
- Melampsalta leptomera Myers, 1921

= Rhodopsalta leptomera =

Species of true bug

Rhodopsalta leptomera, also known as the sand dune redtail cicada, is a species of insect that is endemic to New Zealand. This species was first described in 1921 by J. G. Myers and named Melampsalta leptomera.
