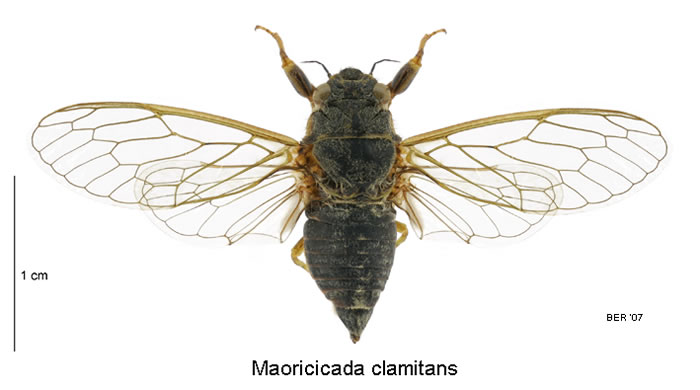
- Female
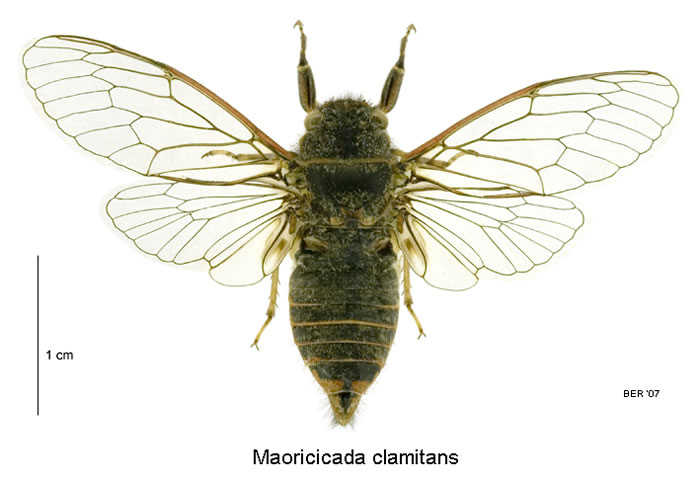
- Male

Scientific classification
- Kingdom: Animalia
- Phylum: Arthropoda
- Clade: Pancrustacea
- Class: Insecta
- Order: Hemiptera
- Suborder: Auchenorrhyncha
- Family: Cicadidae
- Genus: Maoricicada
- Species: M. clamitans

Binomial name
- Maoricicada clamitans Dugdale & Fleming, 1978

= Maoricicada clamitans =

Species of true bug

Maoricicada clamitans, also known as the yodelling cicada, is a species of insect that is endemic to New Zealand. This species was first described by John S. Dugdale and Charles Fleming in 1978.
