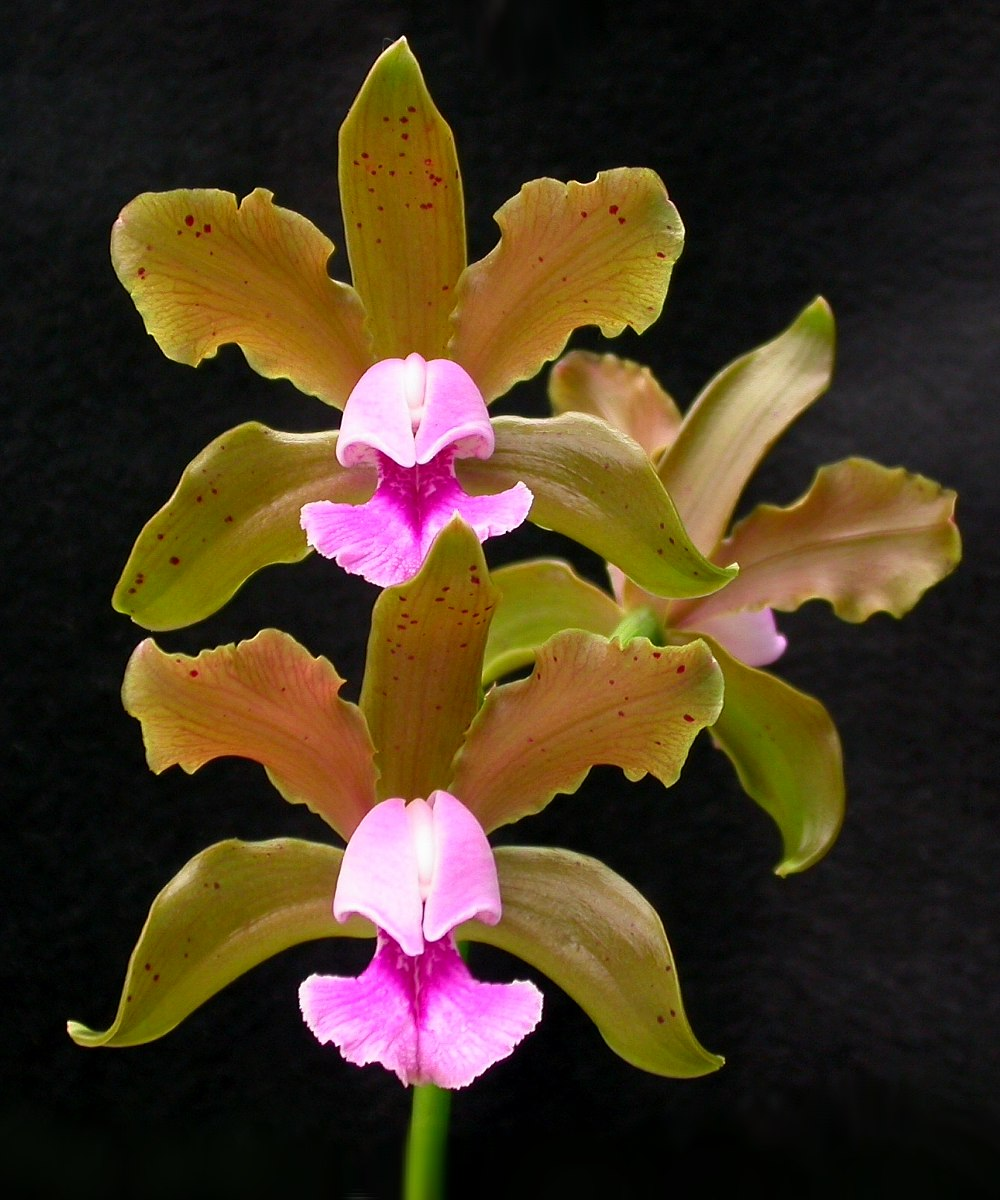

Scientific classification
- Kingdom: Plantae
- Clade: Tracheophytes
- Clade: Angiosperms
- Clade: Monocots
- Order: Asparagales
- Family: Orchidaceae
- Subfamily: Epidendroideae
- Genus: Cattleya
- Subgenus: Cattleya subg. Intermediae
- Species: C. tenuis

Binomial name
- Cattleya tenuis Campacci & Vedovello

= Cattleya tenuis =

Species of orchid

Cattleya tenuis (the "slender-stemmed cattleya") is a species of orchid. It shares the rarely used common name of Easter orchid with C. mossiae and C. schroederae.

Natural hybrids :

- Cattleya × tenuata (= C. elongata × C. tenuis) (Brazil)
