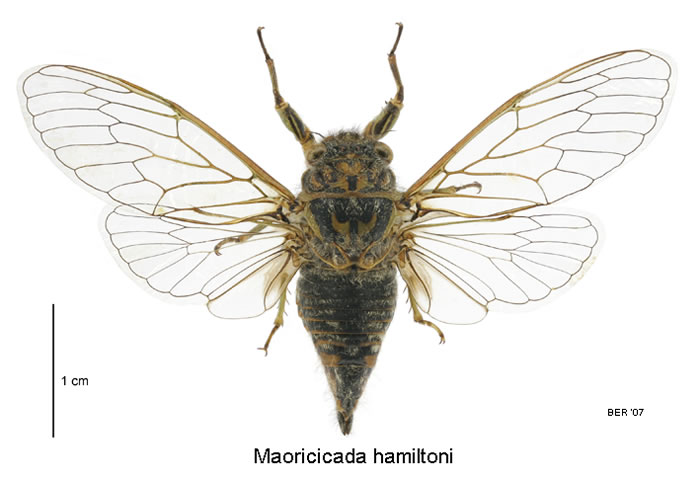
- Female
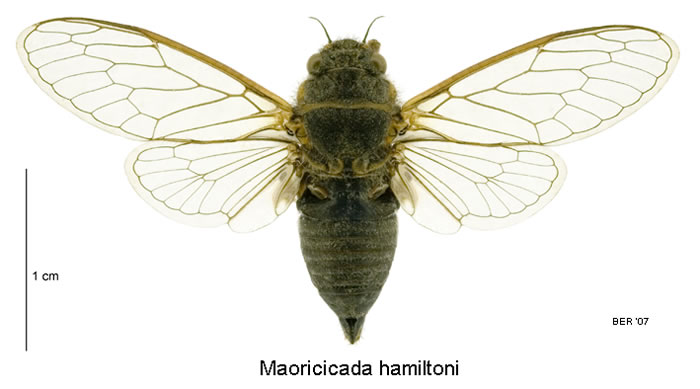
- Male

Scientific classification
- Kingdom: Animalia
- Phylum: Arthropoda
- Clade: Pancrustacea
- Class: Insecta
- Order: Hemiptera
- Suborder: Auchenorrhyncha
- Family: Cicadidae
- Genus: Maoricicada
- Species: M. hamiltoni

Binomial name
- Maoricicada hamiltoni (Myers, 1926)

Synonyms
- Melampsalta hamiltoni Myers, 1926

= Maoricicada hamiltoni =

Species of true bug

Maoricicada hamiltoni, also known as the Hamilton's cicada, is a species of insect that is endemic to New Zealand. This species was first described by John Golding Myers in 1926. This species is named in honour of Harold Hamilton.
