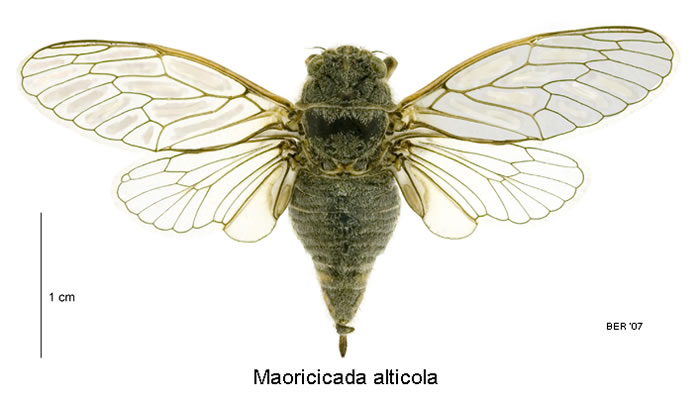
- Female
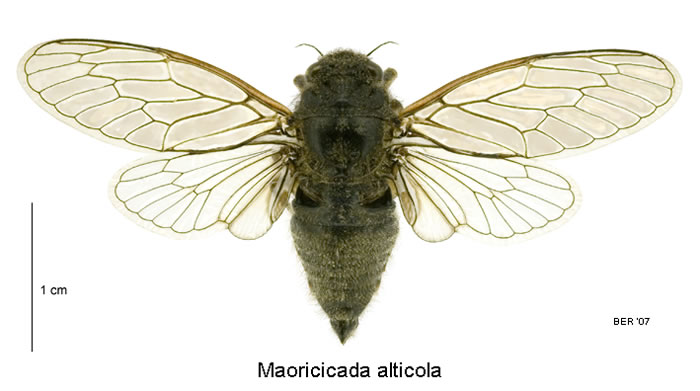
- Male

Conservation status
- Naturally Uncommon (NZ TCS)

Scientific classification
- Kingdom: Animalia
- Phylum: Arthropoda
- Clade: Pancrustacea
- Class: Insecta
- Order: Hemiptera
- Suborder: Auchenorrhyncha
- Family: Cicadidae
- Genus: Maoricicada
- Species: M. alticola

Binomial name
- Maoricicada alticola Dugdale & Fleming, 1978

= Maoricicada alticola =

Species of true bug

Maoricicada alticola, also known as the high alpine cicada, is a species of cicada that is endemic to New Zealand. This species was first described by John S. Dugdale and Charles Fleming in 1978. Under the New Zealand Threat Classification System, this species is listed as "Naturally Uncommon" with the qualifiers of Range Restricted".
