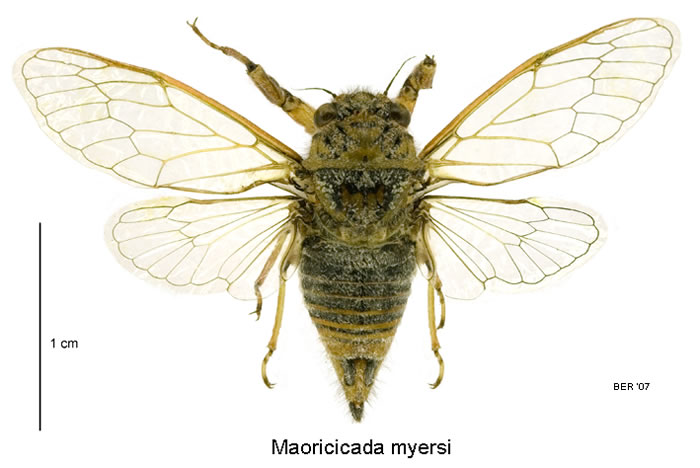
- Female
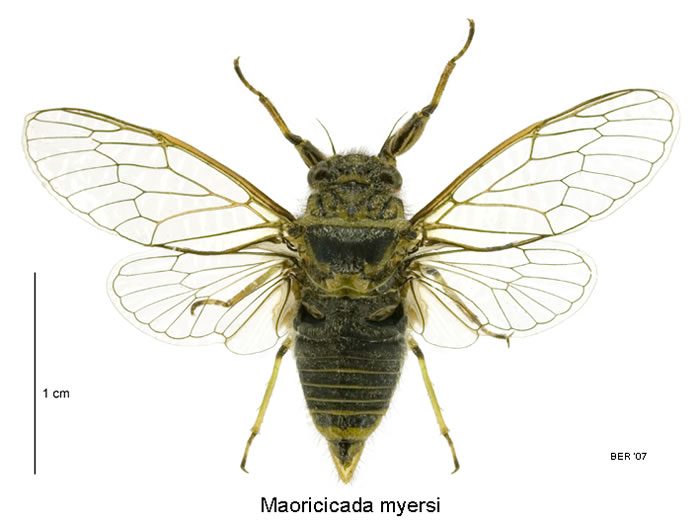
- Male

Conservation status
- Naturally Uncommon (NZ TCS)

Scientific classification
- Kingdom: Animalia
- Phylum: Arthropoda
- Clade: Pancrustacea
- Class: Insecta
- Order: Hemiptera
- Suborder: Auchenorrhyncha
- Family: Cicadidae
- Genus: Maoricicada
- Species: M. myersi

Binomial name
- Maoricicada myersi (Fleming, 1971)

Synonyms
- Cicadetta myersi Fleming, 1971

= Maoricicada myersi =

Species of true bug

Maoricicada myersi, also known as Myers' cicada, is a species of insect that is endemic to New Zealand. This species was first described by Charles Fleming in 1971. Under the New Zealand Threat Classification System, this species is listed as "Naturally Uncommon" with the qualifiers of Range Restricted".
