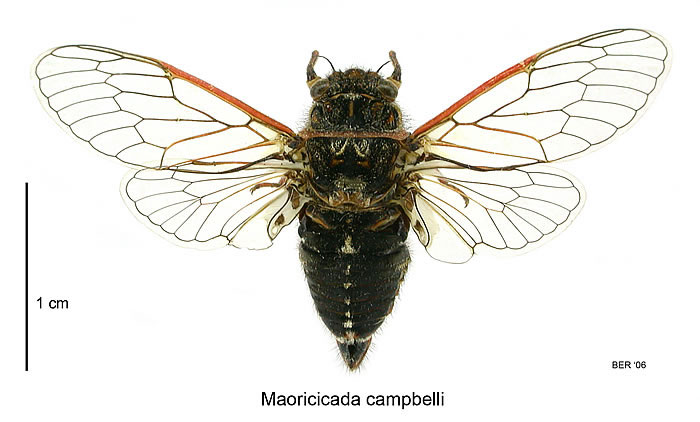

Scientific classification
- Kingdom: Animalia
- Phylum: Arthropoda
- Clade: Pancrustacea
- Class: Insecta
- Order: Hemiptera
- Suborder: Auchenorrhyncha
- Family: Cicadidae
- Genus: Maoricicada
- Species: M. campbelli

Binomial name
- Maoricicada campbelli (Myers, 1923)

Synonyms
- Melampsalta campbelli Myers, 1923

= Maoricicada campbelli =

Species of true bug

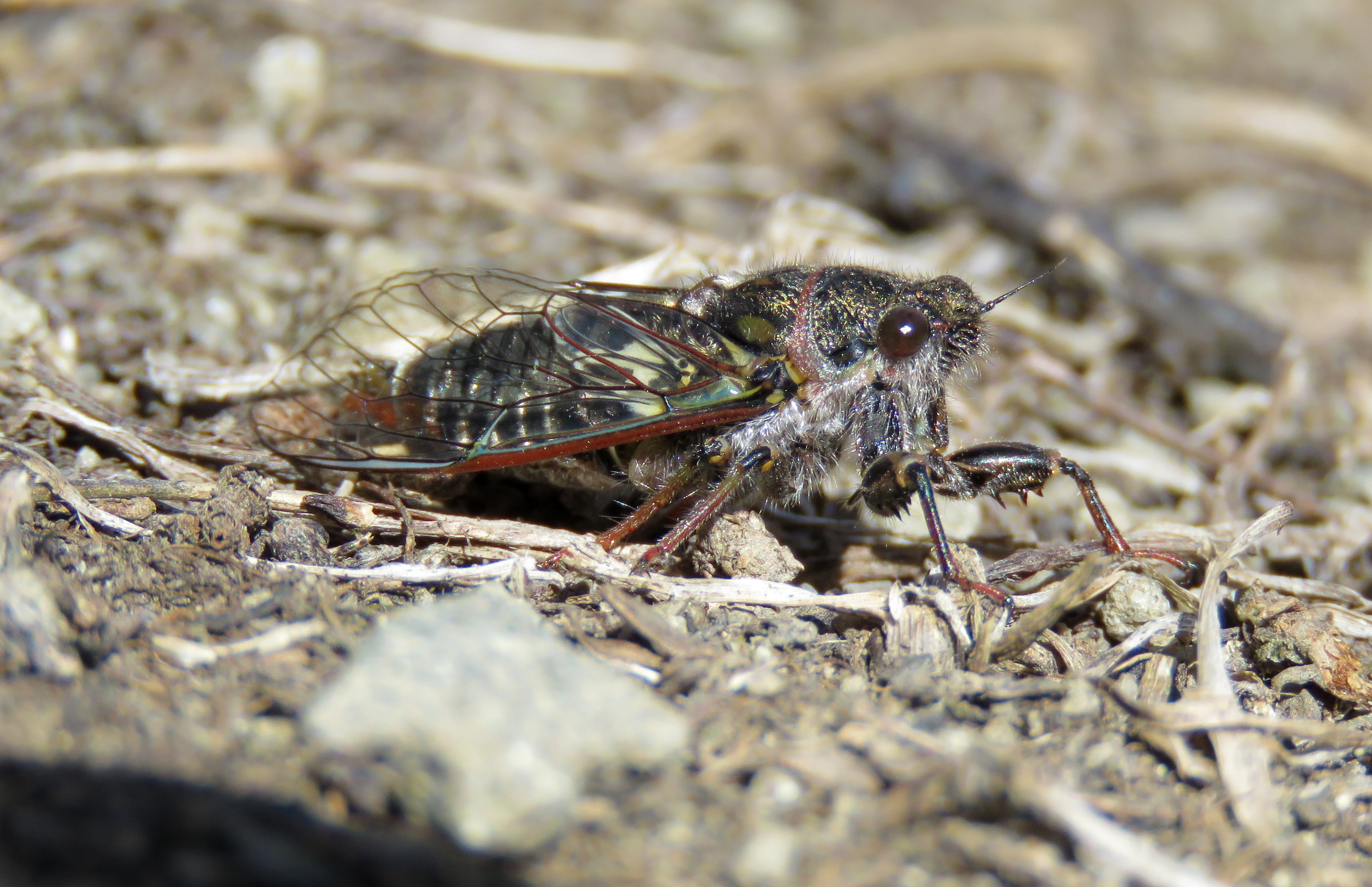
Campbell's Cicada (Maoricicada campbelli) sitting on ground at the edge of Korowai / Torlesse Tussocklands Park, Canterbury.

Maoricicada campbelli, also known as the Campbell's cicada, is a species of cicada that is endemic to New Zealand. This species was first described by John Golding Myers in 1923 under the name Melapsalta campbelli. It was named in honour of James Wishart Campbell, who collected the first specimens of this species.
