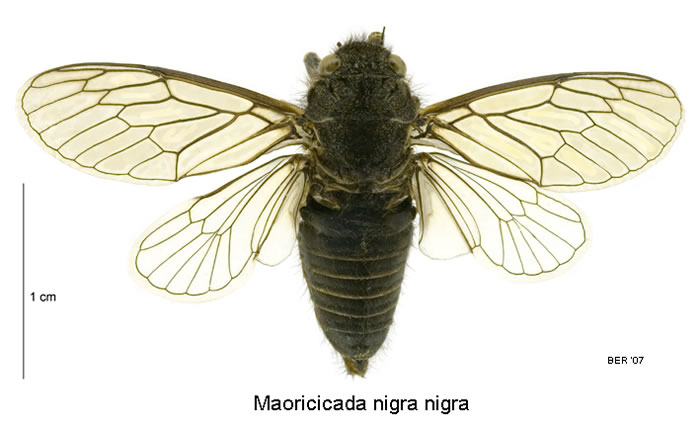
- Male Maoricicada nigra nigra
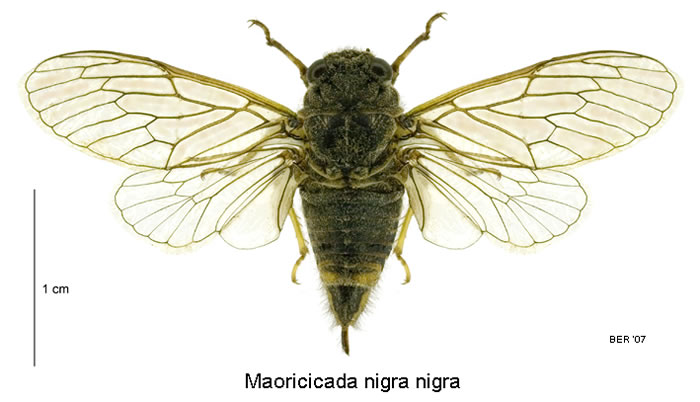
- Female Maoricicada nigra nigra

Scientific classification
- Kingdom: Animalia
- Phylum: Arthropoda
- Class: Insecta
- Order: Hemiptera
- Suborder: Auchenorrhyncha
- Family: Cicadidae
- Genus: Maoricicada
- Species: M. nigra

Binomial name
- Maoricicada nigra (Myers, 1921)

Synonyms
- Melampsalta nigra Myers, 1921

= Maoricicada nigra =

Species of insect

Maoricicada nigra, commonly known as Subnival Cicada, is a species in the genus Maoricicada. This species was first described by John Golding Myers in 1921 and is endemic to New Zealand.

== Subspecies ==
There are two known subspecies:

- Maoricicada nigra frigida (Dugdale & Fleming, 1978) – the Eastern subnival cicada
- Maoricicada nigra nigra (Myers, 1921) – the Western subnival cicada
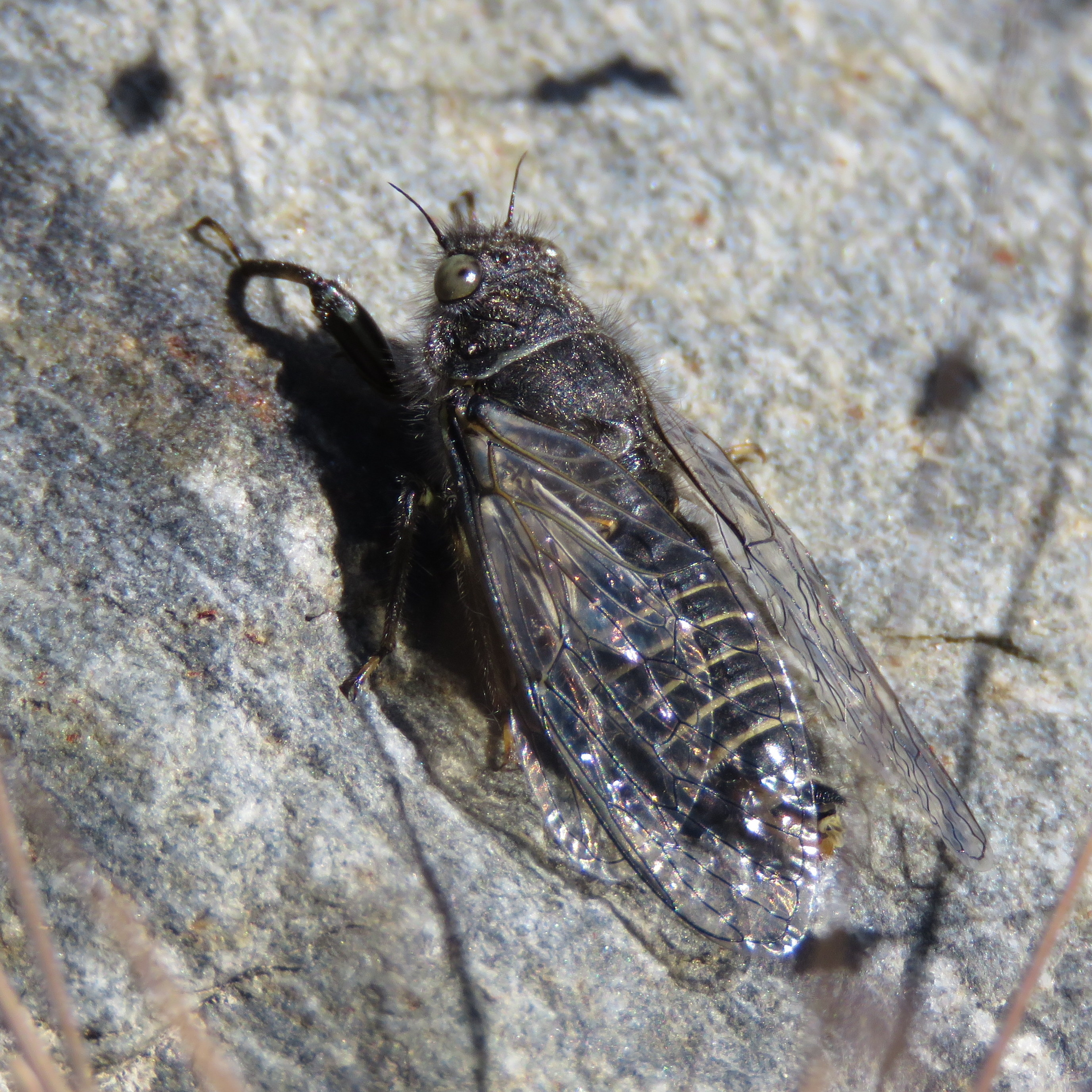
  Eastern Subnival Cicada (Maoricicada nigra frigida) sunning on rock near the Remarkables Ski Area, Otago.
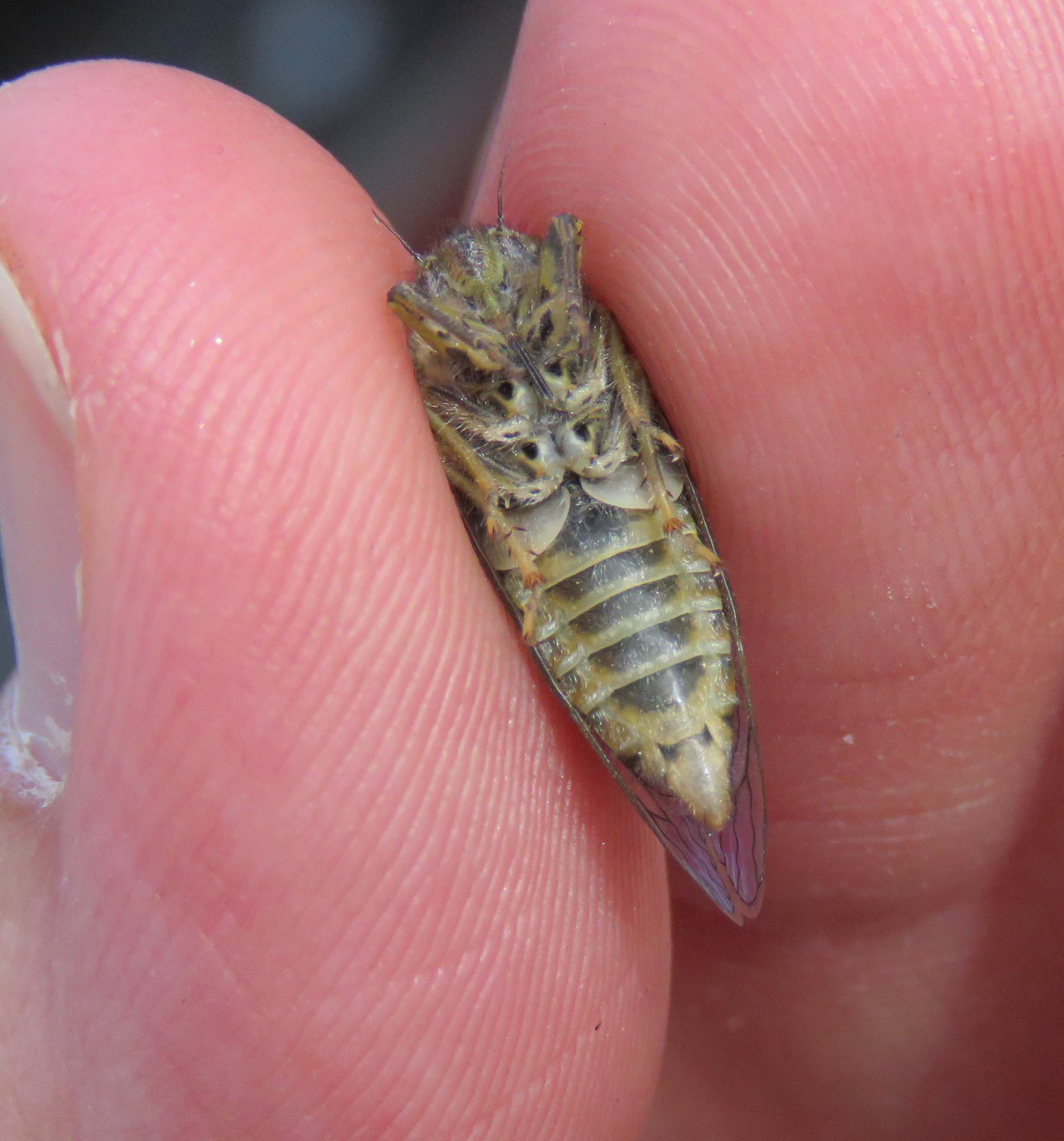
  View showing distinctive markings on the cicada's ventral surface, Old Man Range, Central Otago.

== Description ==
Maoricicada nigra are described as being shining black with a short, thick abdomen, dark brown eyes, red ocelli, no markings, and pubescence (hairs) present. Both sub-species of Maoricicada nigra are short-wide cicadas with pale setae (hairs) on their head and dark setae on their abdomen. Males are darker than females, and the genus is distinct from others as they have no alarm call. There are 19 taxa in the Maoricicada genus, five of which are subspecies.

== Range ==
=== Natural global range ===
The Maoricicada genus is endemic to New Zealand.

=== New Zealand range ===
M. nigra is found in the alpine areas of the South Island of New Zealand with slight range differentiation between the sub-species (M. nigra nigra, and M. nigra frigida).

== Habitat ==
M. nigra frigida are found in alpine, semi-tundra areas with permanently moist soil and Asteraceae-dominated terrain. M. nigra nigra live in an alpine environment and have been observed in subnival (winter snow only) and nival environments (permanent snow and ice).

== Ecology ==
=== Life cycle/Phenology ===
The lifecycle of M. nigra is, like many of New Zealand’s insect species, understudied. Female cicadas will cut notches into tree branches and lay eggs in them using a specialised appendage called an ovipositor. Nymphs hatch from the eggs and drop to the ground to find soil. Cicada nymphs are creamy-white and have claw legs to dig into the soil, about 40cm below the surface.

Cicadas spend the rest of their nymph stage, the longest stage of their life (from 3 to 5 years), below the soil and will shed their skin multiple times as they grow bigger. Moulting is the process of shedding an exoskeleton which allows the cicada to grow.

When they are larger and more developed, the nymphs burrow to the surface and find a high place to climb up during the night in places such as trees and shrubs. The cicadas will shed once more as an imago signalling their maturation into adulthood.

The adult cicadas will fly away in the morning to find a mate and reproduce. Male M. nigra sing to attract a mate using specialised structures called tymbals to produce noise. Tymbals are located on the side of the male’s abdomen and are pushed out and popped back in repeatedly to make a sound. Both subspecies of M. nigra alternate between two contrasting notes by synchronising the low-frequency doublets (clicks) from either (left or right) tymbal and alternating the high-frequency doublets. The song of a male M. nigra makes an “er-chit- er-chit- er-chit- er-chit… ” sound.

Both female and male M. nigra have tympana; ear-like structures used to hear noise. Tympana are connected to an auditory system which allows for the intake of sound. Their auditory system works so well that when a male sings he must ensure he doesn’t deafen himself by creating a fold in his tympanum. M. nigra are most found as adults during January and February but have an estimated season from November to April.

=== Diet and foraging ===
Both nymph and adult forms of M. nigra are xylem-feeders. They use their piercing-sucking mouth parts, characteristic of the Hemiptera order, to feed from sap in plant roots (nymphs) and tree branches (adults).

=== Predators, Parasites, and Diseases ===
General predators of cicada are parasitic wasps which infest the cicada eggs, beetles which hunt nymphs, and fungal parasites that can kill nymphs and adults. Other predators include spiders, birds, and mammals, which can eat cicadas as nymphs and adults. Predatory mammals, introduced to New Zealand as early as the 1800’s, pose a threat to cicadas even in alpine environments.
