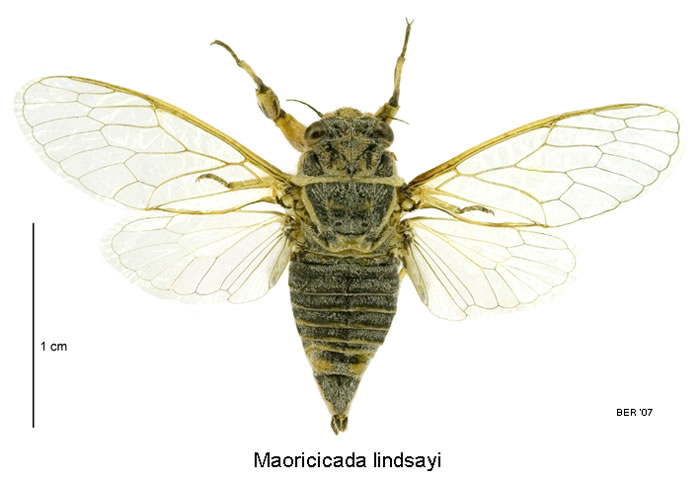
- Female
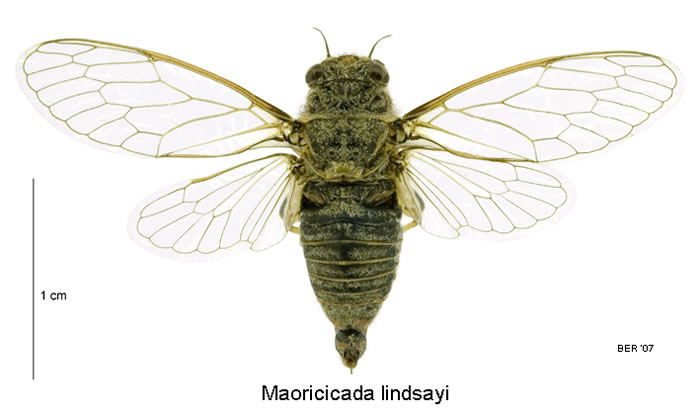
- Male

Scientific classification
- Kingdom: Animalia
- Phylum: Arthropoda
- Clade: Pancrustacea
- Class: Insecta
- Order: Hemiptera
- Suborder: Auchenorrhyncha
- Family: Cicadidae
- Genus: Maoricicada
- Species: M. lindsayi

Binomial name
- Maoricicada lindsayi (Myers, 1923)

Synonyms
- Pauropsalta lindsayi Myers, 1923

= Maoricicada lindsayi =

Species of true bug

Maoricicada lindsayi, also known as the Lindsay's cicada, is a species of cicada that is endemic to New Zealand. This species was first described by John Golding Myers in 1923. Myers named the species in honour of Charles Lindsay who collected the holotype specimen.
