= T. tenuis =

T. tenuis may refer to:

- Tellina tenuis, the thin tellin, a marine bivalve mollusc species found off the coasts of north west Europe and in the Mediterranean Sea
- Typhlops tenuis, a harmless blind snake species found in Mexico, Guatemala and Honduras

== See also ==
- Tenuis (disambiguation)
