= Clypeola =

Clypeola may refer to:

- Clypeola (gastropod), a sea snail genus in the family Calyptraeidae
- Clypeola (plant), a plant genus in the family Brassicaceae
