= Easter orchid =

Easter orchid is the common name of one of three fragrant orchids:

- Cattleya mossiae, a native of Venezuela
- Cattleya schroederae, a native of Colombia
- Earina autumnalis, a native of New Zealand
Plants named Easter orchid
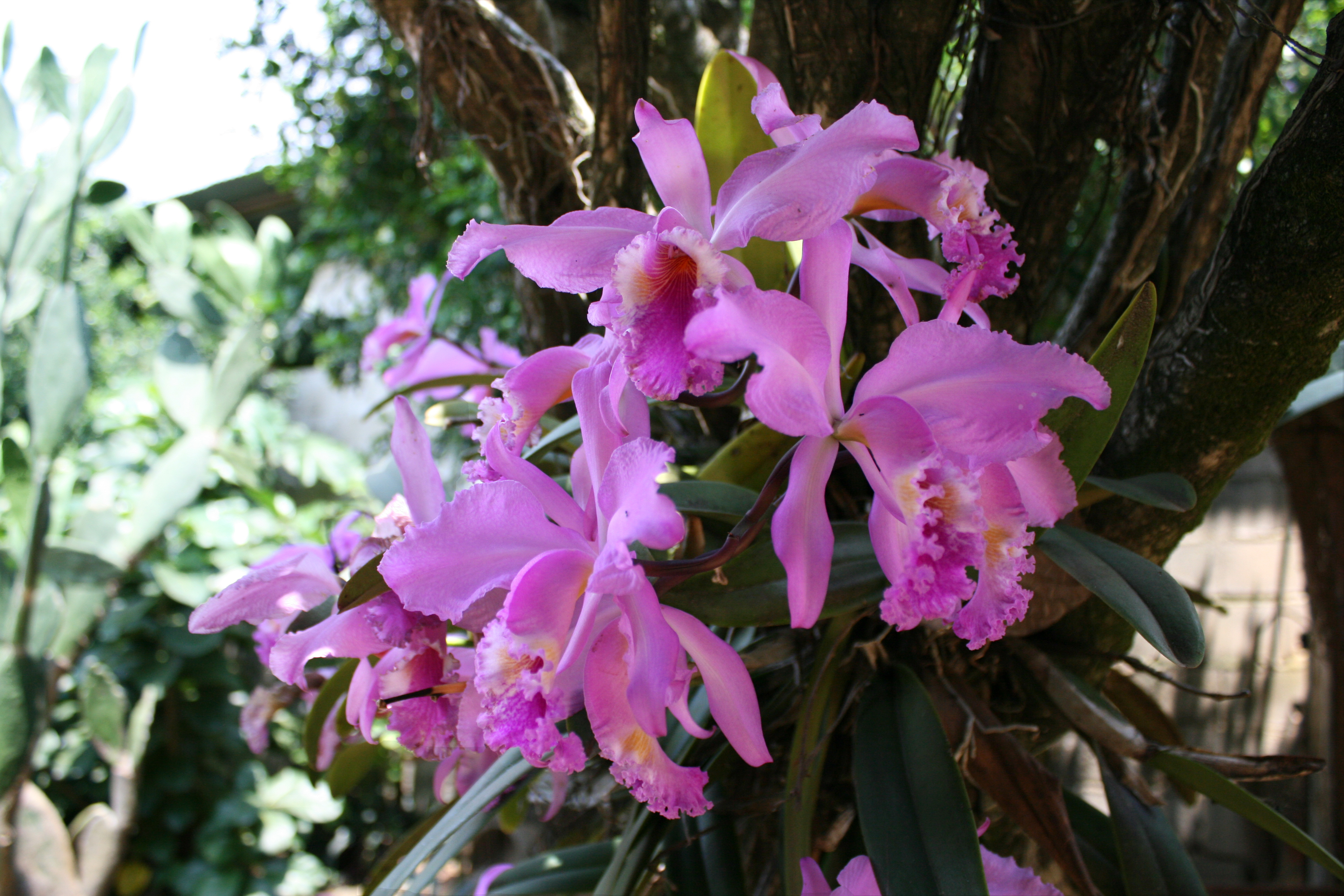
Cattleya mossiae

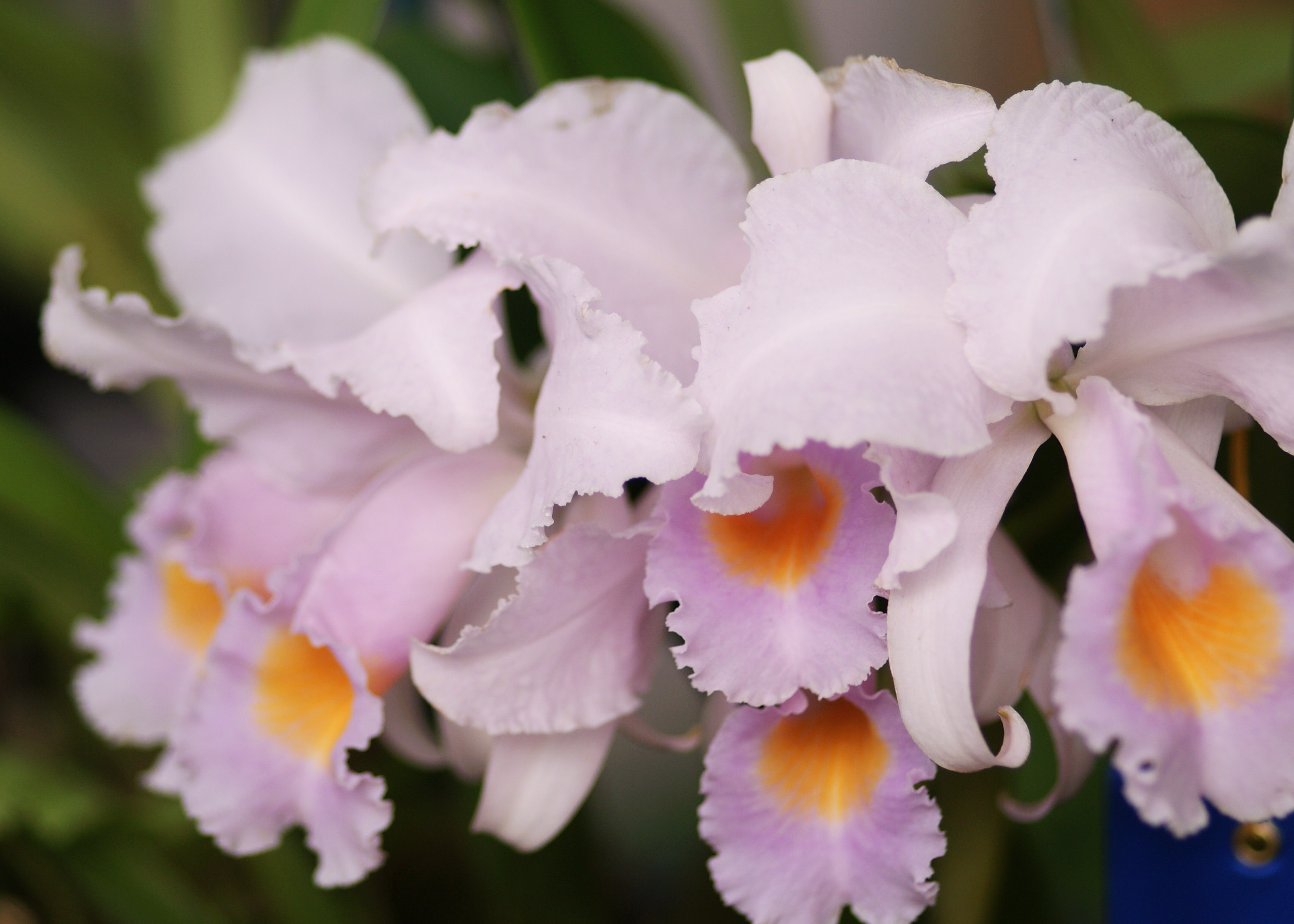
Cattleya schroederae

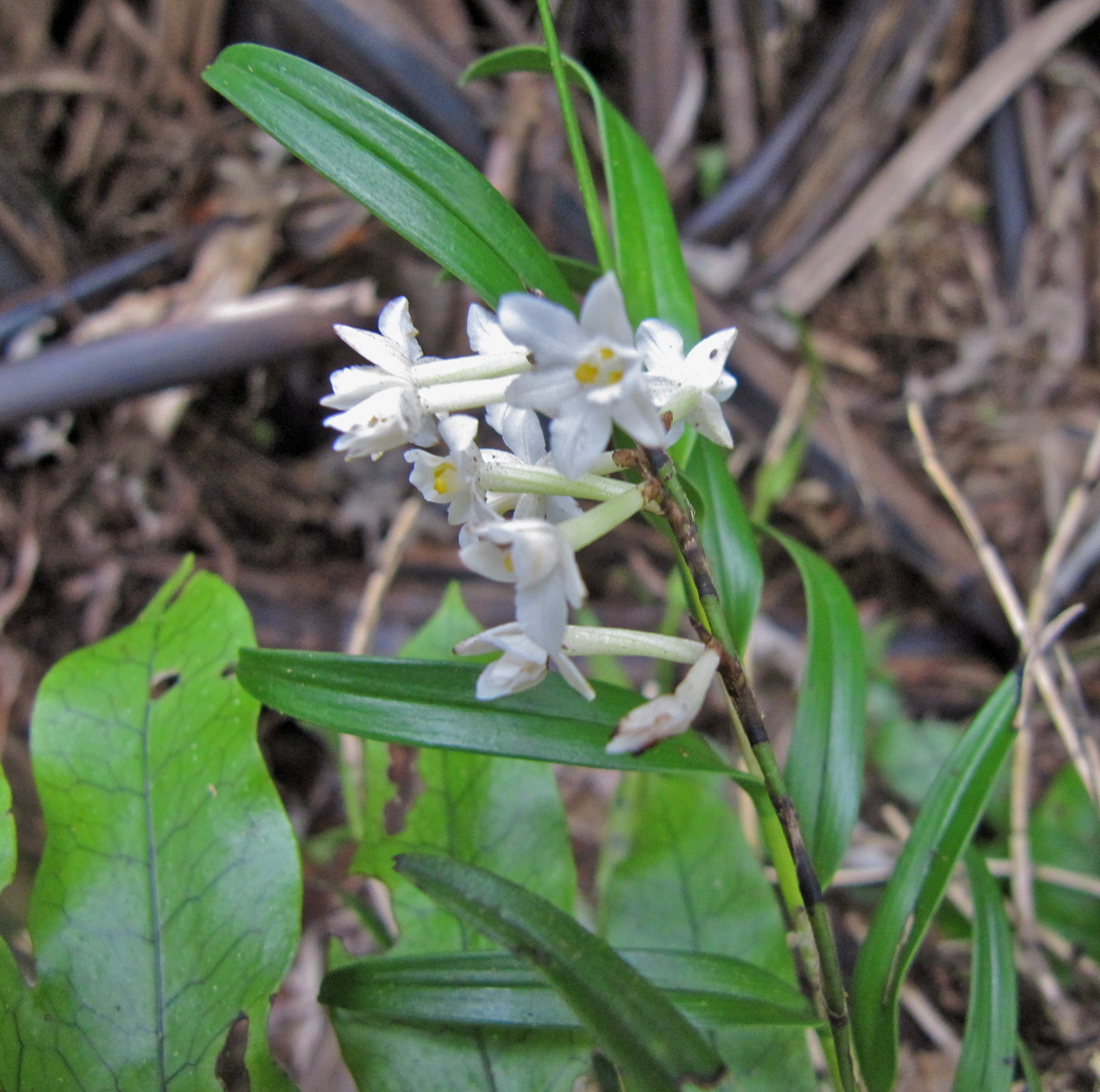
Earina autumnali
