= Tenuis =

Tenuis, weak or slender in Latin, and a species in zoology, may refer to:

Language

- Tenuis consonant, an obstruent (stop, affricate or rarely fricative) that is voiceless, unaspirated and unglottalized.

Zoology

- Acropora tenuis is a species of acroporid coral found in the Red Sea, the Gulf of Aden.
- Anatoma tenuis, a species of minute sea snail.
- Copulabyssia tenuis, a species of sea snail.
- Chromodoris tenuis, a species of colourful sea slug.
- Dirofilaria tenuis, a species of nematode parasitic roundworm.
- Hierodula tenuis, a species of praying mantis in the family Mantidae.
- Maoricicada tenuis, a species of insect that is endemic to New Zealand.
- Montebello tenuis, a monotypic genus of Australian ground spiders.
- Odostomia tenuis, a species of sea snail.
- Tenuiphantes tenuis, a species of spider.
- Tenuis tetra, a fish species.
- Triplophysa tenuis, a species of ray-finned fish.
