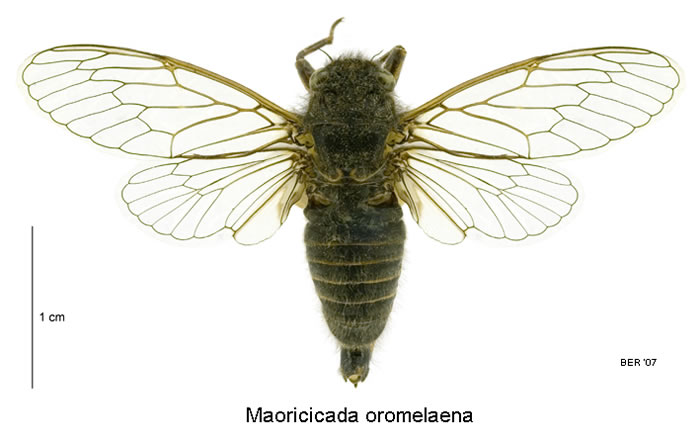
- Male
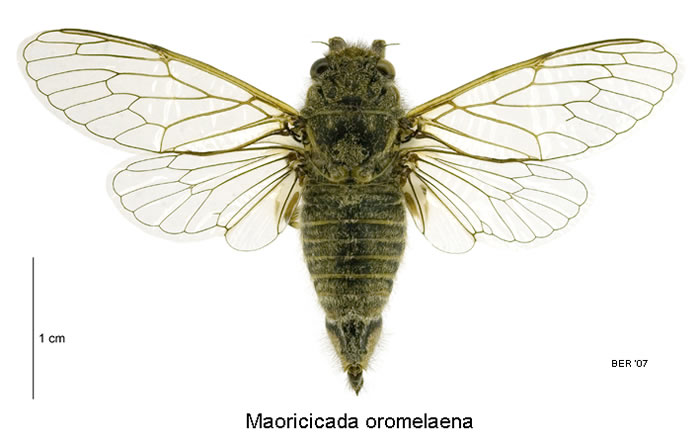
- Female

Scientific classification
- Kingdom: Animalia
- Phylum: Arthropoda
- Clade: Pancrustacea
- Class: Insecta
- Order: Hemiptera
- Suborder: Auchenorrhyncha
- Family: Cicadidae
- Genus: Maoricicada
- Species: M. oromelaena

Binomial name
- Maoricicada oromelaena (Myers, 1926)

Synonyms
- Melampsalta oromelaena Myers, 1926

= Maoricicada oromelaena =

Species of true bug

Maoricicada oromelaena, also known as the greater alpine black cicada, is a species of insect that is endemic to New Zealand. This species was first described by John Golding Myers in 1926.
