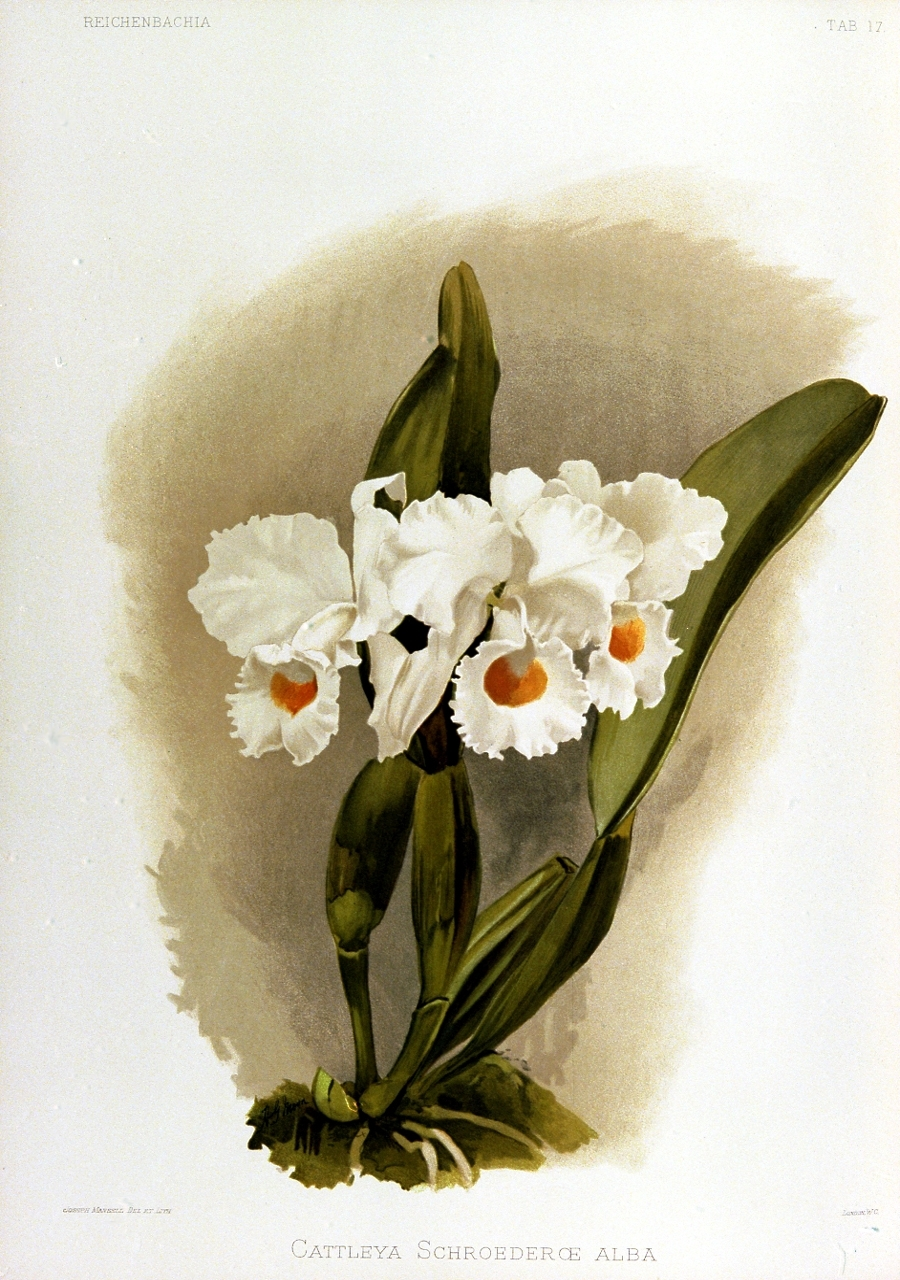

Conservation status
- Endangered (IUCN 3.1)

Scientific classification
- Kingdom: Plantae
- Clade: Tracheophytes
- Clade: Angiosperms
- Clade: Monocots
- Order: Asparagales
- Family: Orchidaceae
- Subfamily: Epidendroideae
- Genus: Cattleya
- Subgenus: Cattleya subg. Cattleya
- Section: Cattleya sect. Cattleya
- Species: C. schroederae

Binomial name
- Cattleya schroederae (Rchb.f.) Sander

Synonyms
- Cattleya trianae var. schroederae Rchb.f.; Cattleya labiata var. schroederae (Rchb.f.) Sander; Cattleya schroederae var. alba Sander; Cattleya schroederae f. alba (Sander) M.Wolff & O.Gruss

= Cattleya schroederae =

Species of orchid

Cattleya schroederae is a species of orchid. C. schroederae is named after Baroness Schroeder, wife of Sir John Schroder. It is a Colombian unifoliate Cattleya species. Flowers are to 9 in (23 cm) across, strongly fragrant. C. shroederae blooms in spring from a sheath that has formed before the winter dormancy. As it blooms around Easter in Northern hemisphere, it is often referred to as "Easter orchid", a name it shares with Cattleya mossiae.
