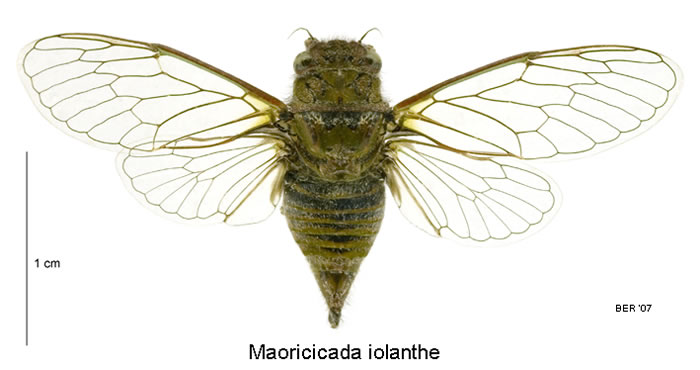
- Female
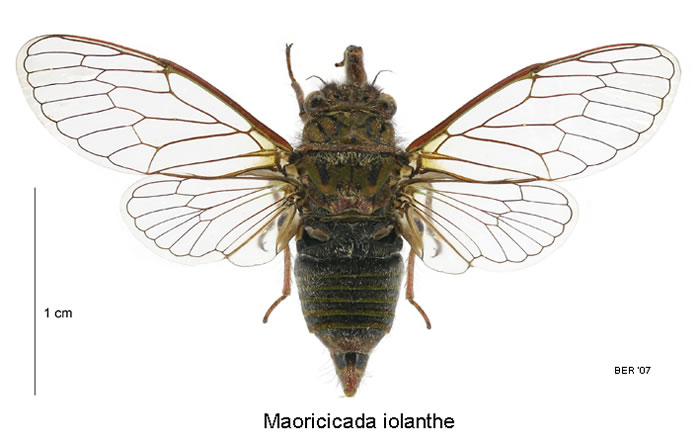
- Male

Scientific classification
- Kingdom: Animalia
- Phylum: Arthropoda
- Clade: Pancrustacea
- Class: Insecta
- Order: Hemiptera
- Suborder: Auchenorrhyncha
- Family: Cicadidae
- Genus: Maoricicada
- Species: M. iolanthe

Binomial name
- Maoricicada iolanthe (Hudson, 1891)

Synonyms
- Cicada iolanthe Hudson, 1891

= Maoricicada iolanthe =

Species of true bug

Maoricicada iolanthe, also known as the Iolanthe cicada, is a species of insect that is endemic to New Zealand. This species was first described by George Vernon Hudson in 1891.
