= Sigapatella nukumaruana =

Scientific classification
- Kingdom: Animalia
- Phylum: Mollusca
- Class: Gastropoda
- Subclass: Caenogastropoda
- Order: Littorinimorpha
- Family: Calyptraeidae
- Genus: Sigapatella
- Species: S. nukumaruana

Binomial name
- Sigapatella nukumaruana Marshall, 2003

Species of gastropod

Sigapatella nukumaruana is a species of sea snail, a marine gastropod mollusk in the family Calyptraeidae, which includes slipper snails or slipper limpets, cup-and-saucer snails, and Chinese hat snails.
