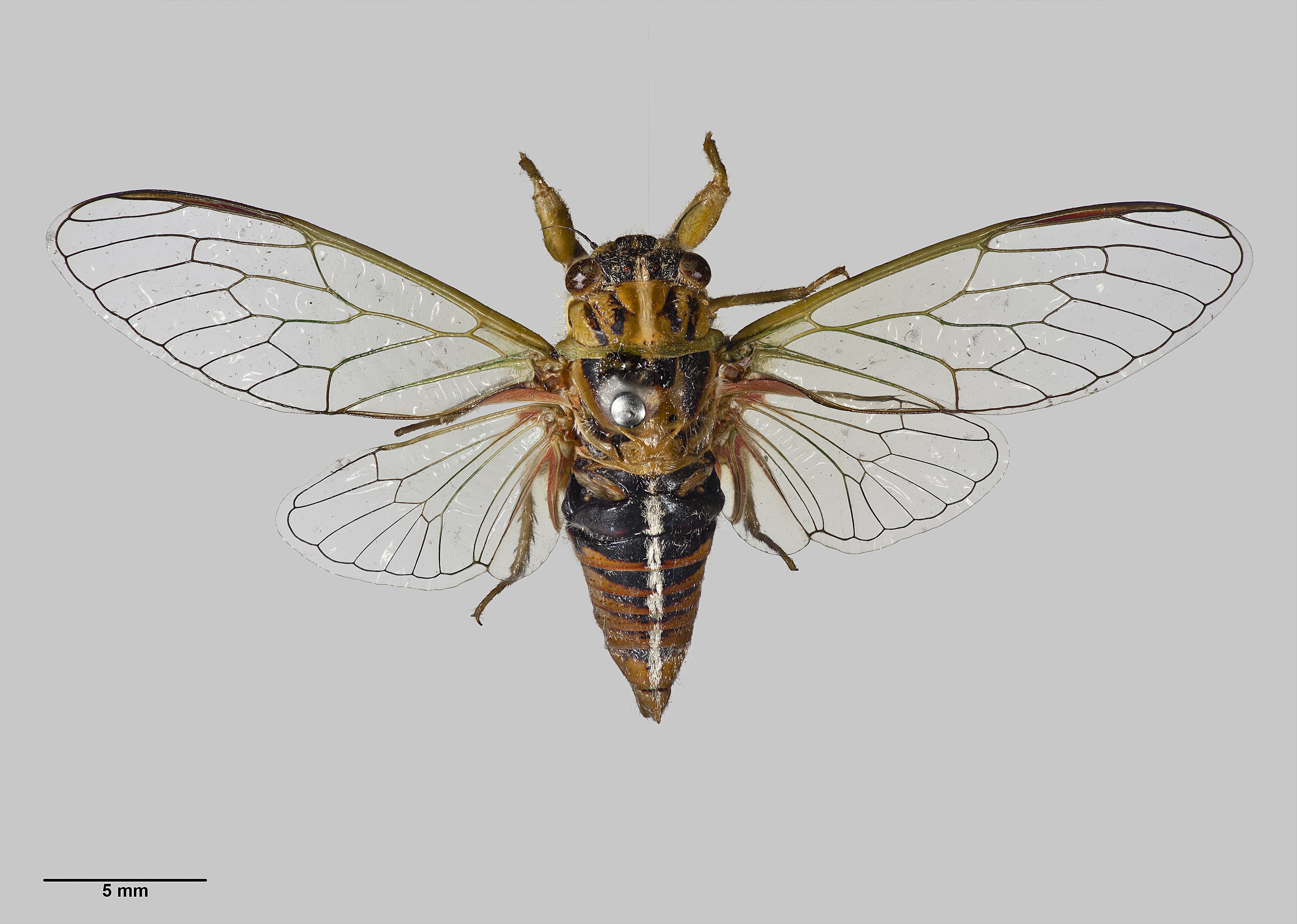
- A lectotype specimen of Rhodopsalta cruentata held at the Auckland War Memorial Museum.

Scientific classification
- Kingdom: Animalia
- Phylum: Arthropoda
- Clade: Pancrustacea
- Class: Insecta
- Order: Hemiptera
- Suborder: Auchenorrhyncha
- Superfamily: Cicadoidea
- Family: Cicadidae
- Genus: Rhodopsalta; Dugdale, 1972

= Rhodopsalta =

Genus of true bugs

Rhodopsalta is a genus of cicada in the family Cicadidae. It is endemic to New Zealand.

== Species ==
- Rhodopsalta cruentata (Fabricius, 1775)
- Rhodopsalta leptomera (Myers, 1921)
- Rhodopsalta microdora (Hudson, 1936)
