= Pleistorallus =

Pleistorallus flemingi Temporal range: Middle Pleistocene

Scientific classification
- Kingdom: Animalia
- Phylum: Chordata
- Class: Aves
- Order: Gruiformes
- Family: Rallidae
- Genus: †Pleistorallus; Worthy, 1997
- Species: †P. flemingi

Binomial name
- †Pleistorallus flemingi Worthy, 1997

Extinct genus of birds

Pleistorallus flemingi, also referred to as Fleming's rail, is a genus and species of extinct bird in the rail family from the Middle Pleistocene (about one million years ago) of New Zealand. It was a large and stout rail about the same size as the extant takahē. It was described by Trevor Worthy in 1997 from fossil material (a right tibiotarsus and distal left femur) found in coastal deposits near Marton, in the Rangitikei District of the North Island. The genus name Pleistorallus refers to the Pleistocene age of the fossils; the specific epithet honours Charles Fleming (1916–1987) for his contributions to New Zealand ornithology and palaeontology.
