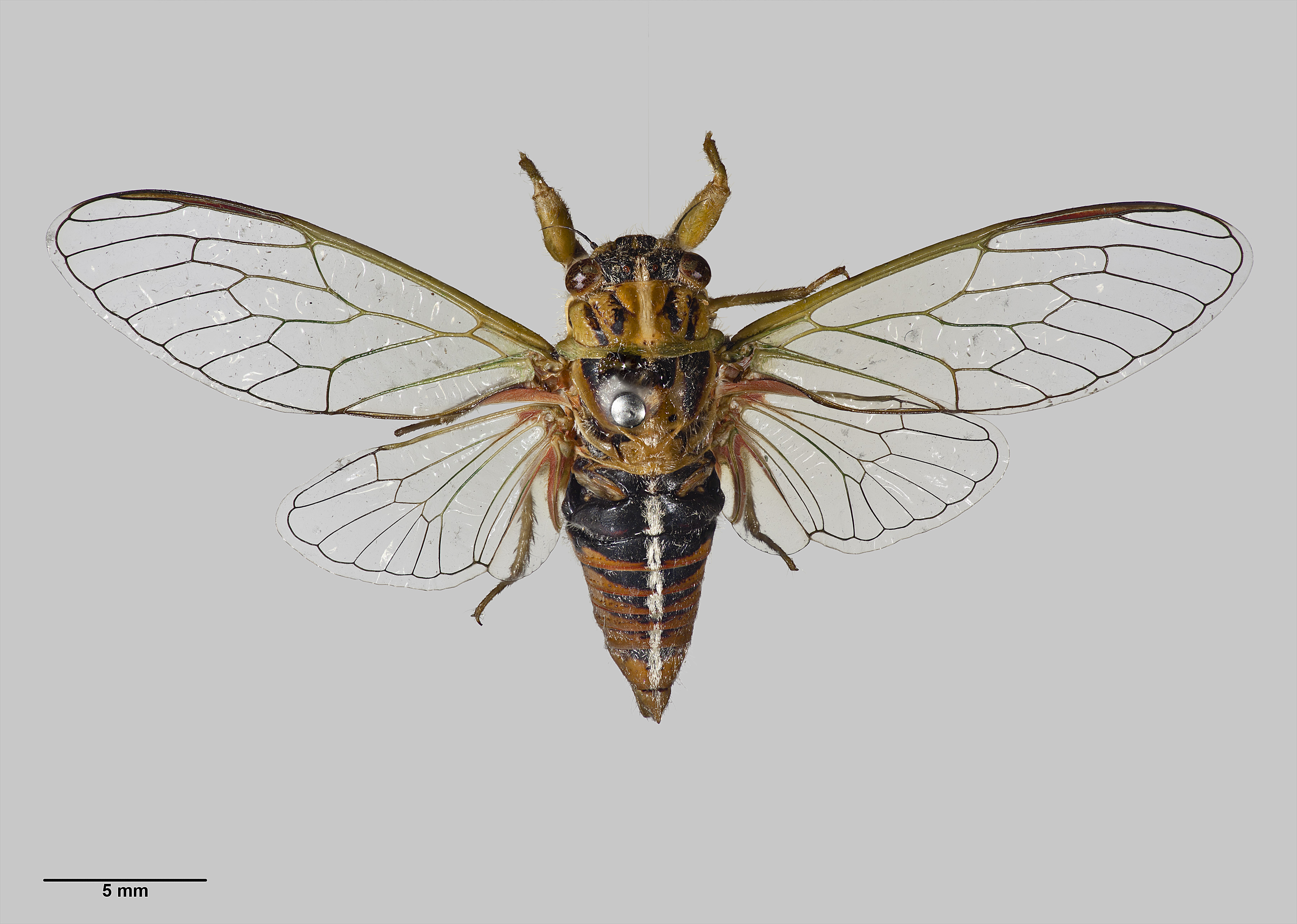

Scientific classification
- Kingdom: Animalia
- Phylum: Arthropoda
- Clade: Pancrustacea
- Class: Insecta
- Order: Hemiptera
- Suborder: Auchenorrhyncha
- Family: Cicadidae
- Genus: Rhodopsalta
- Species: R. cruentata

Binomial name
- Rhodopsalta cruentata (Fabricius, 1775)

Synonyms
- Tettigonia cruentata Fabricius, 1775

= Rhodopsalta cruentata =

Species of true bug

Rhodopsalta cruentata, also known as the blood redtail cicada, is a species of insect that is endemic to New Zealand. This species was first described in 1775 by Johann Christian Fabricius and named Tettigonia cruentata.
