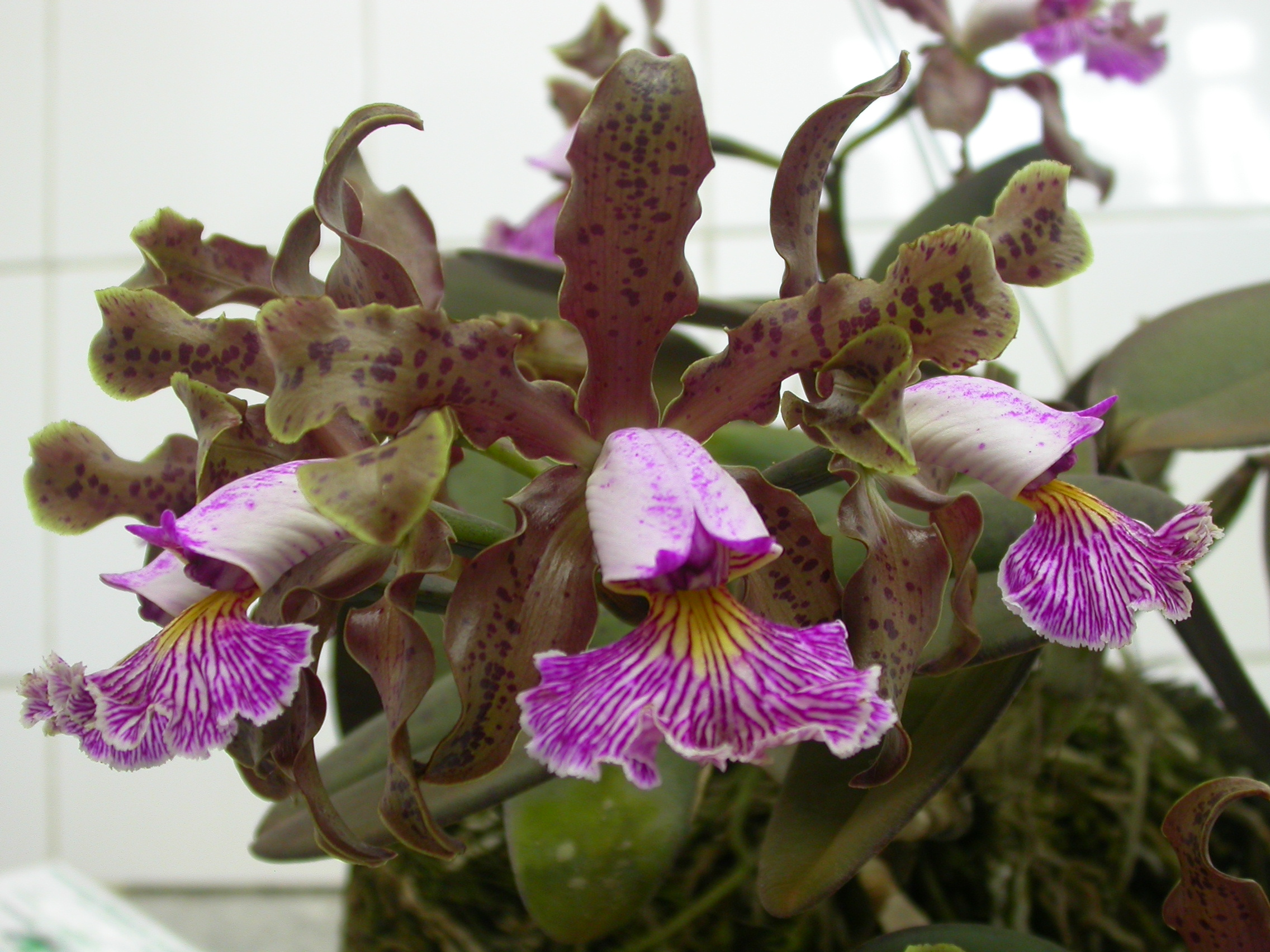

Scientific classification
- Kingdom: Plantae
- Clade: Tracheophytes
- Clade: Angiosperms
- Clade: Monocots
- Order: Asparagales
- Family: Orchidaceae
- Subfamily: Epidendroideae
- Genus: Cattleya
- Subgenus: Cattleya subg. Intermediae
- Species: C. schilleriana

Binomial name
- Cattleya schilleriana Rchb.f.

Synonyms
- Epidendrum schillerianum (Rchb.f.) Rchb.f.; Cattleya schilleriana var. concolor Hook.; Cattleya regnellii R. Warner; Cattleya schilleriana var. amaliana L. Linden & Rodigas

= Cattleya schilleriana =

Species of orchid

Cattleya schilleriana is a species of bifoliate Cattleya orchid.

It is endemic to Bahia state in coastal eastern Brazil.

Today it is considered extinct in nature.

Natural hybrids

- Cattleya × undulata ( = C. elongata × C. schilleriana) (Brazil).
