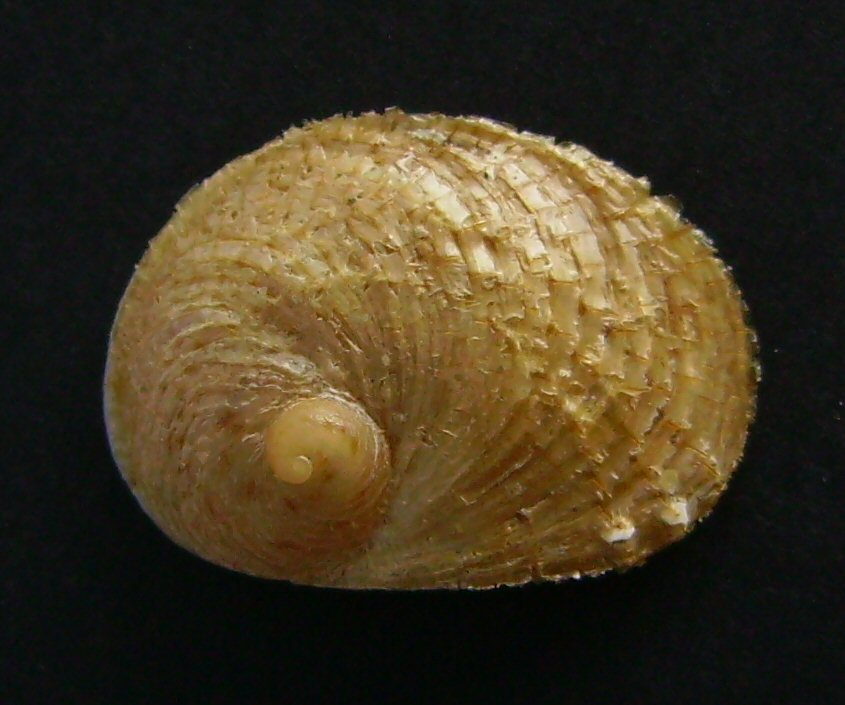
- Dorsal view of a shell of Sigapatella superstes

Scientific classification
- Kingdom: Animalia
- Phylum: Mollusca
- Class: Gastropoda
- Subclass: Caenogastropoda
- Order: Littorinimorpha
- Family: Calyptraeidae
- Genus: Sigapatella
- Species: S. superstes

Binomial name
- Sigapatella superstes Fleming, 1958

= Sigapatella superstes =

Species of gastropod

Sigapatella superstes is a species of medium-sized sea snail, a marine gastropod mollusc in the family Calyptraeidae.

== Distribution ==
This species is endemic to New Zealand.
