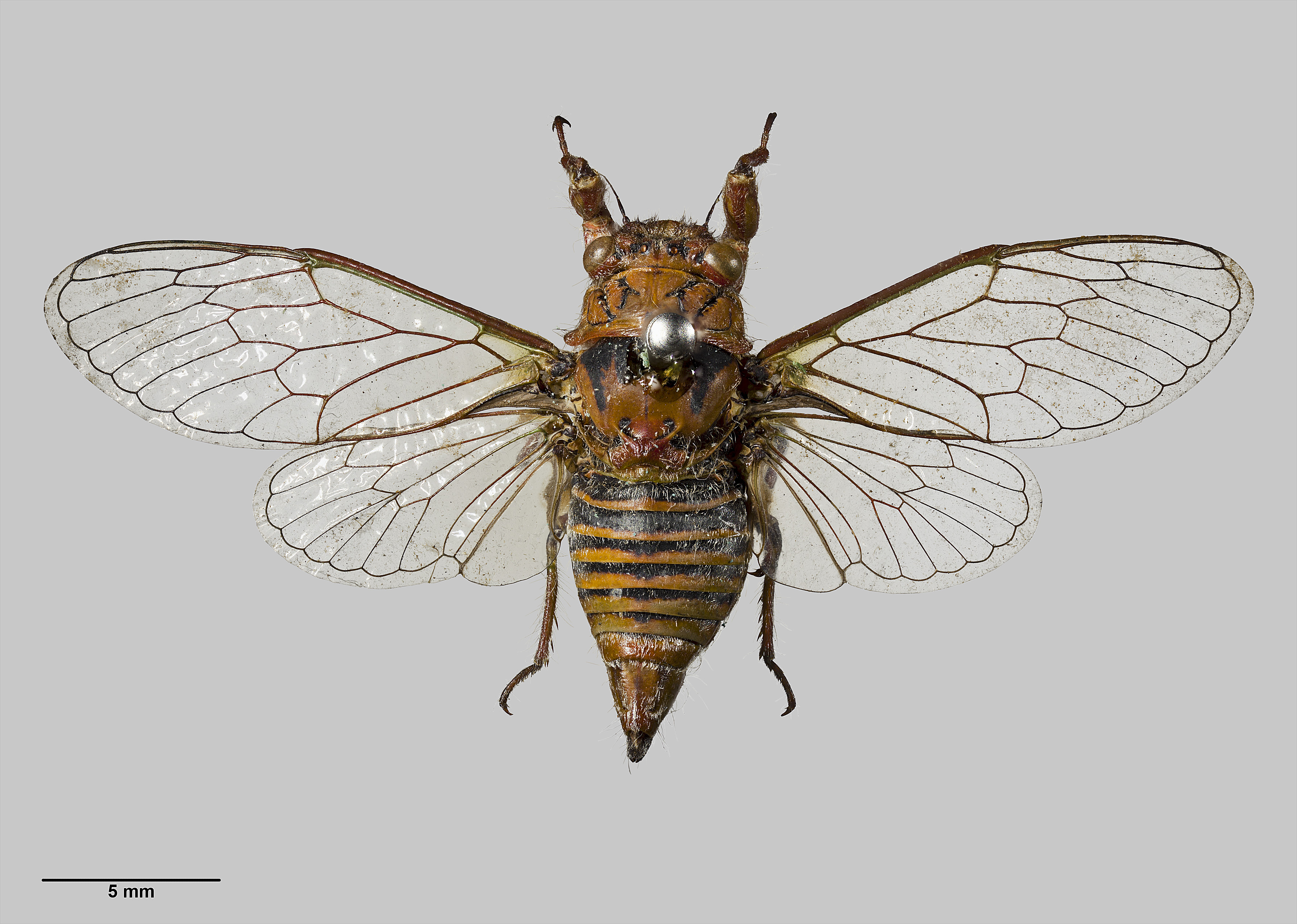
- Female specimen of Maoricicada iolanthe AMNZ21720 held at the Auckland War Memorial Museum.

Scientific classification
- Kingdom: Animalia
- Phylum: Arthropoda
- Clade: Pancrustacea
- Class: Insecta
- Order: Hemiptera
- Suborder: Auchenorrhyncha
- Family: Cicadidae
- Subfamily: Cicadettinae
- Tribe: Cicadettini
- Genus: Maoricicada; Dugdale, 1972

Species
- See text

= Maoricicada =

Genus of true bugs

Maoricicada, commonly known as black cicadas or mountain black cicadas, is a genus of cicada in the family Cicadidae. This genus is endemic to New Zealand.

== Species ==
The World Auchenorrhyncha Database includes:

- Maoricicada alticola Dugdale and Fleming 1978
- Maoricicada campbelli (Myers 1923) - type species
- Maoricicada cassiope (Hudson 1891)
- Maoricicada clamitans Dugdale and Fleming 1978
- Maoricicada hamiltoni (Myers 1926)
- Maoricicada iolanthe (Hudson 1891)
- Maoricicada lindsayi (Myers 1923)
- Maoricicada mangu (White, 1879)
- Maoricicada myersi (Fleming 1971)
- Maoricicada nigra (Myers 1921)
- Maoricicada oromelaena (Myers 1926)
- Maoricicada otagoensis Dugdale and Fleming 1978
- Maoricicada phaeoptera Dugdale and Fleming 1978
- Maoricicada tenuis Dugdale and Fleming 1978

== Gallery ==
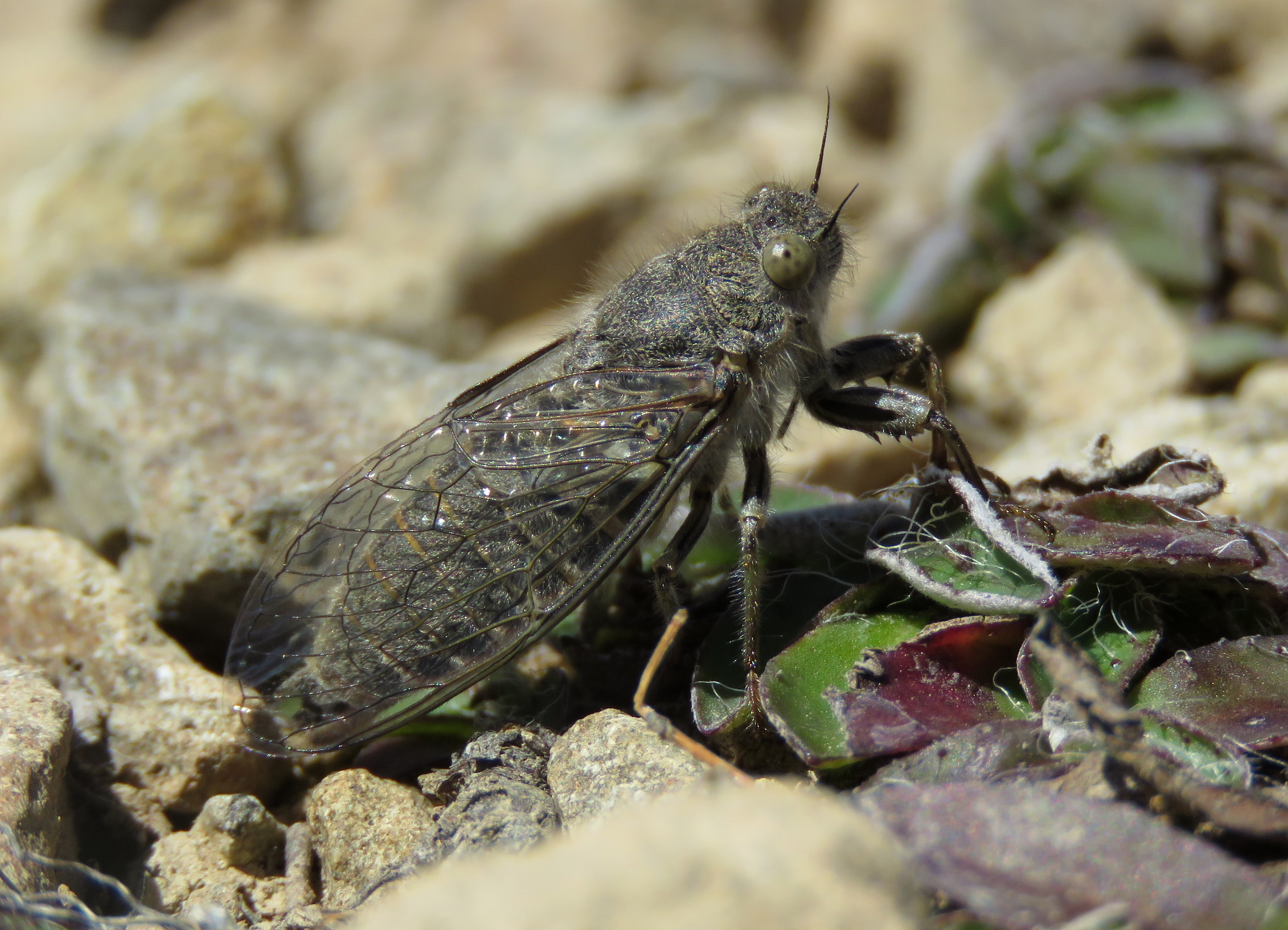

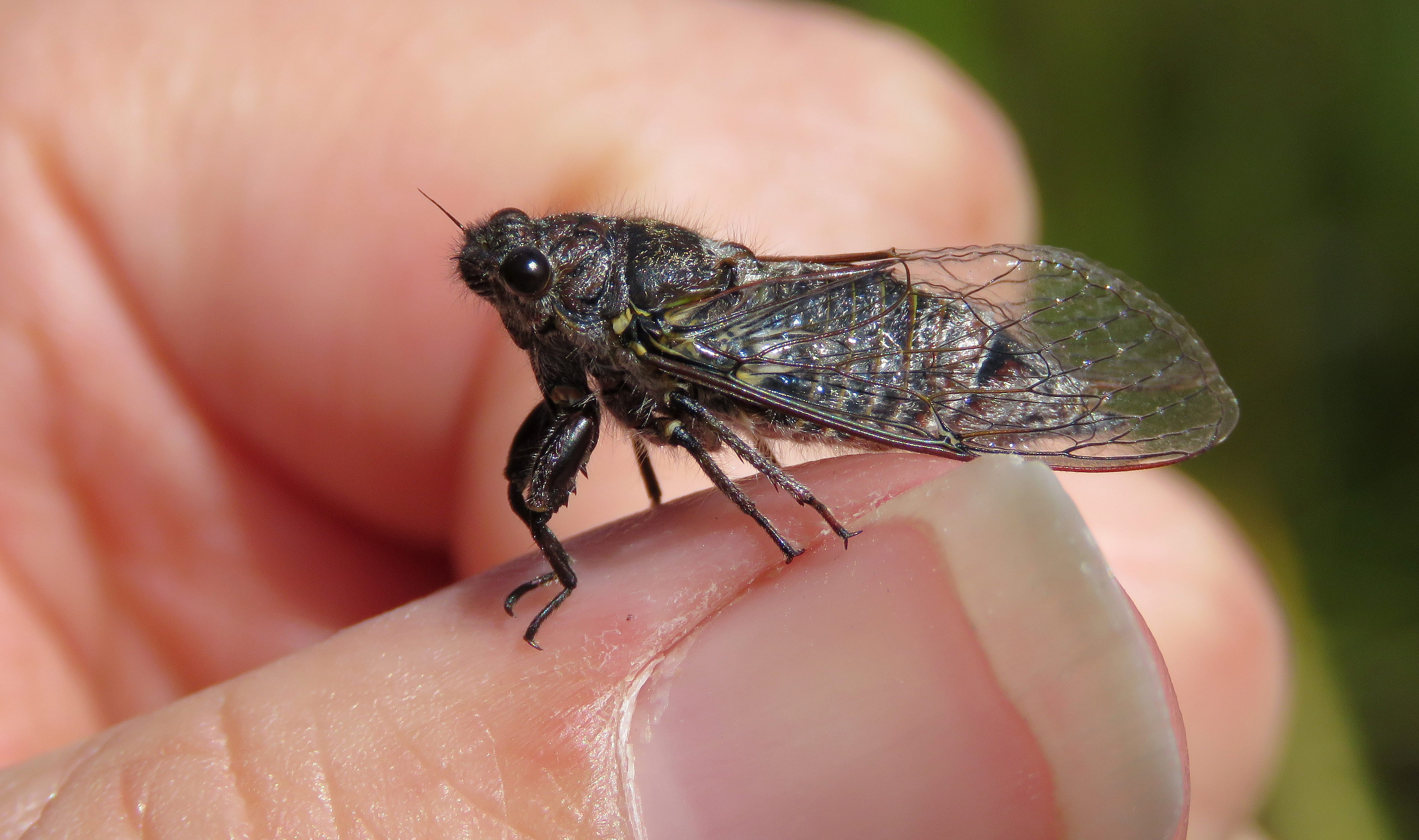

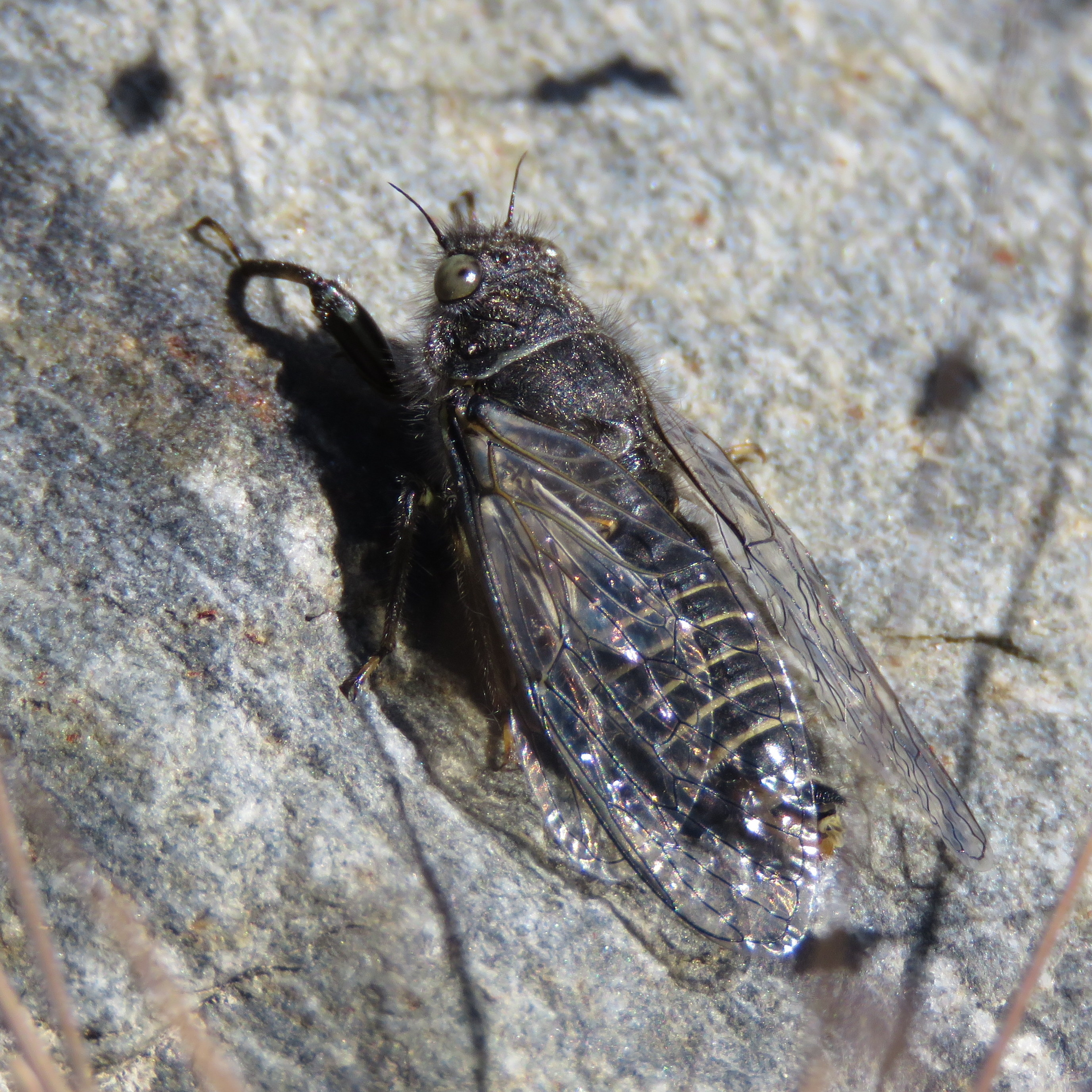

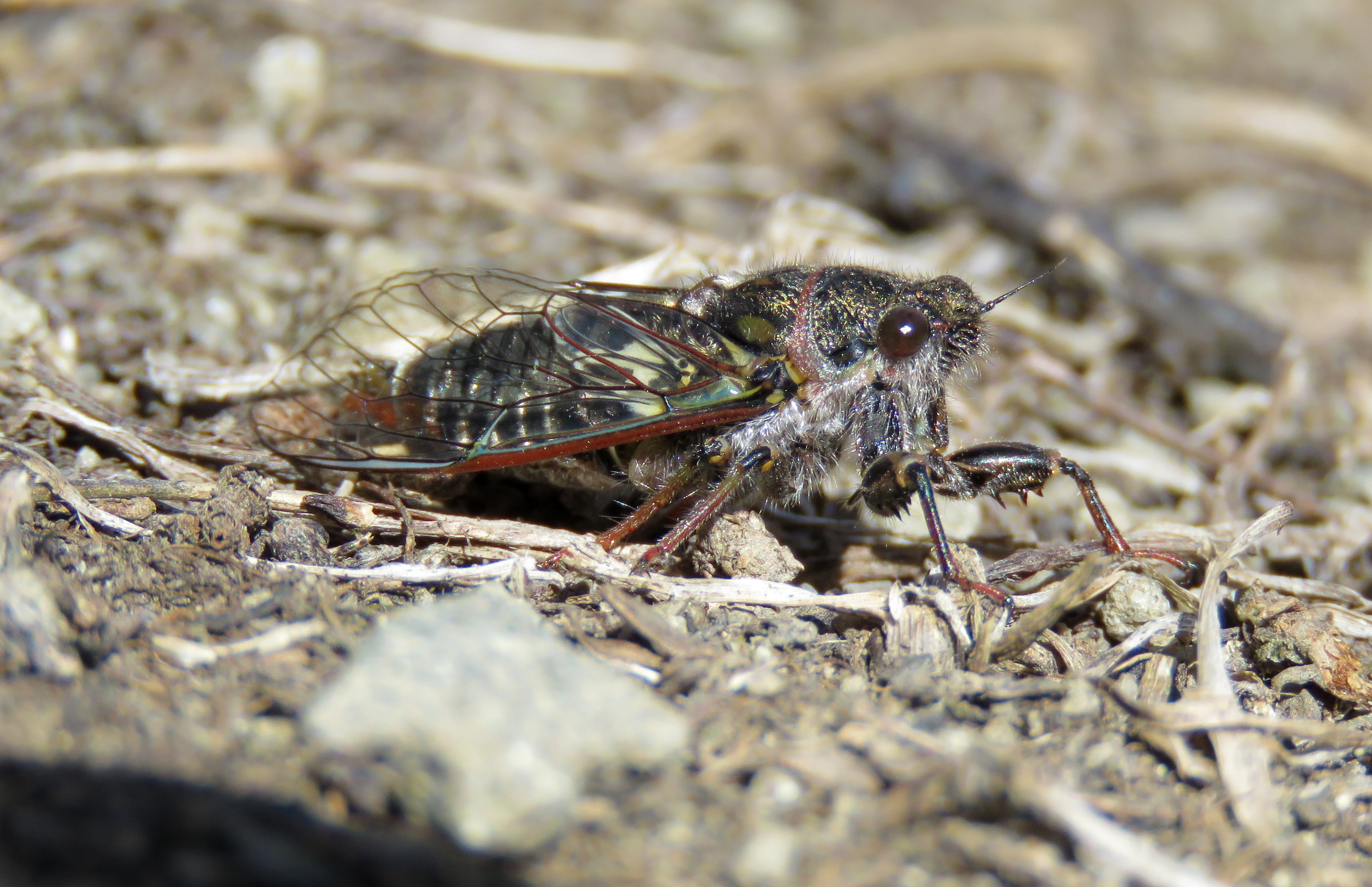

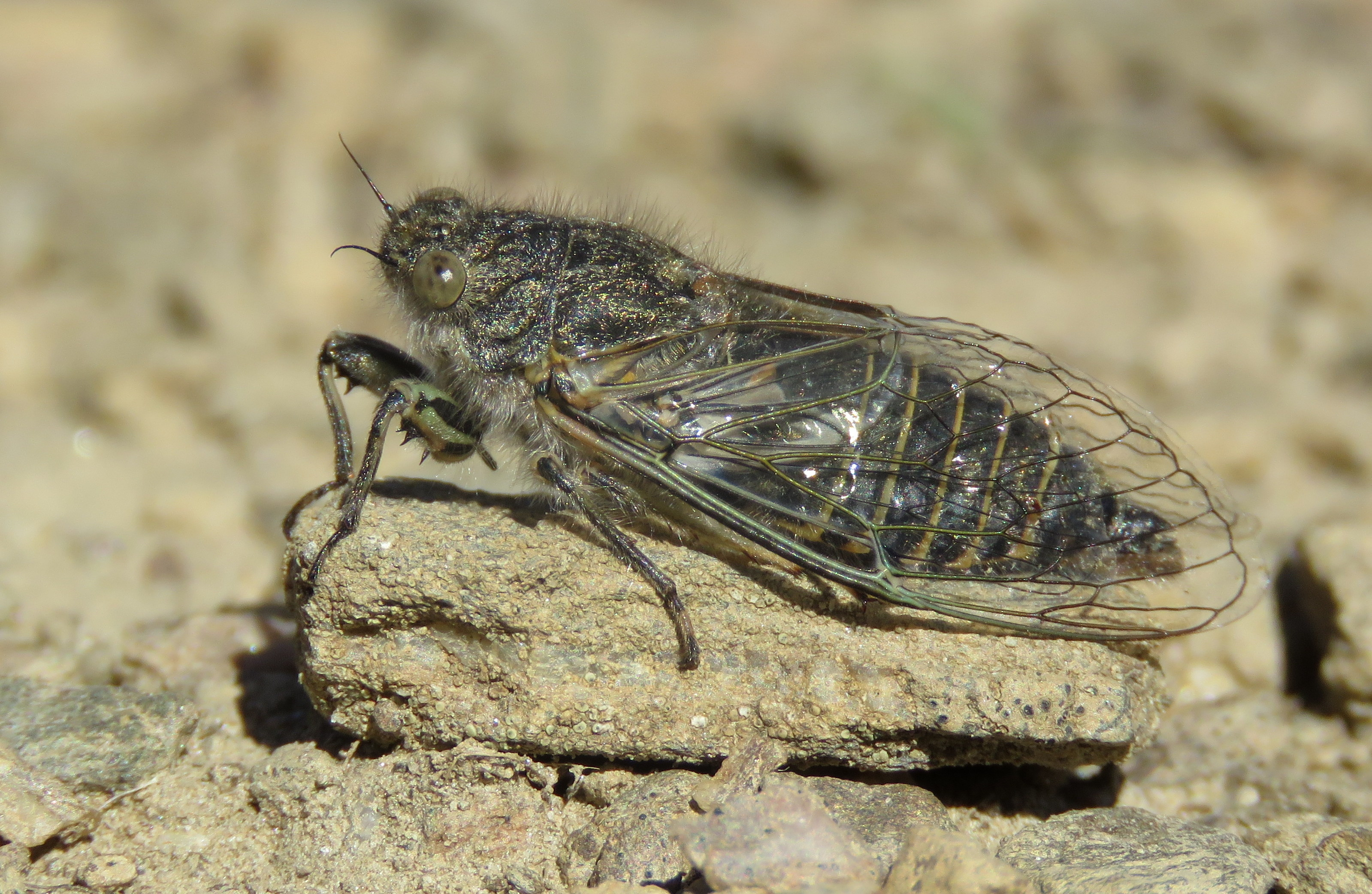
