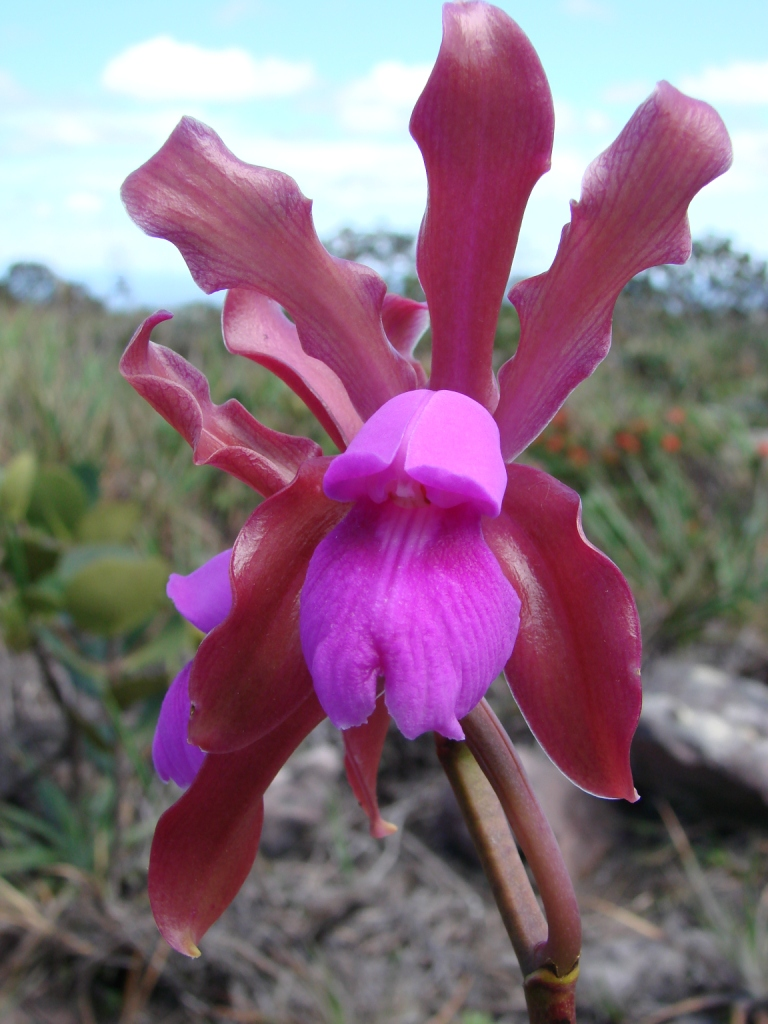

Scientific classification
- Kingdom: Plantae
- Clade: Tracheophytes
- Clade: Angiosperms
- Clade: Monocots
- Order: Asparagales
- Family: Orchidaceae
- Subfamily: Epidendroideae
- Genus: Cattleya
- Subgenus: Cattleya subg. Intermediae
- Species: C. elongata

Binomial name
- Cattleya elongata Barb.Rodr.

Synonyms
- Cattleya alexandrae L.Linden & Rolfe; Cattleya nilsonii Regel; Cattleya alexandrae var. elegans Rolfe; Cattleya alexandrae var. tenebrosa Rolfe; Cattleya alexandrae var. maculata auct. Cattleya alexandrae var. rosea auct. Cattleya elongata var. elegans (Rolfe) Fowlie; Cattleya elongata var. tenebrosa (Rolfe) Fowlie; Cattleya elongata var. maculata (auct.) Braem; Cattleya elongata var. rosea (auct.) Braem; Cattleya elongata f. alba F.Barros & J.A.N.Bat.

= Cattleya elongata =

Species of orchid

Cattleya elongata, the "cattleya with the elongated stalk", is an orchid species in the genus Cattleya endemic to the campo rupestre vegetation in northeastern Brazil.

Its ploidy is 2n = 80.

Cattleya elongata forms two natural hybrids :

- Cattleya × tenuata (= C. elongata × C. tenuis) (Brazil) .
- Cattleya × undulata ( = C. elongata × C. schilleriana) (Brazil).
