= Sigapatella ohopeana =

Scientific classification
- Kingdom: Animalia
- Phylum: Mollusca
- Class: Gastropoda
- Subclass: Caenogastropoda
- Order: Littorinimorpha
- Family: Calyptraeidae
- Genus: Sigapatella
- Species: S. ohopeana

Binomial name
- Sigapatella ohopeana Marshall, 2003

Species of gastropod

Sigapatella ohopeana is a species of sea snail, a marine gastropod mollusk in the family Calyptraeidae, the slipper snails or slipper limpets, cup-and-saucer snails, and Chinese hat snails.
