= Jean Fleming (environmentalist) =

New Zealand reproductive biologist (born 1952)

Jean Fleming ONZM CRSNZ
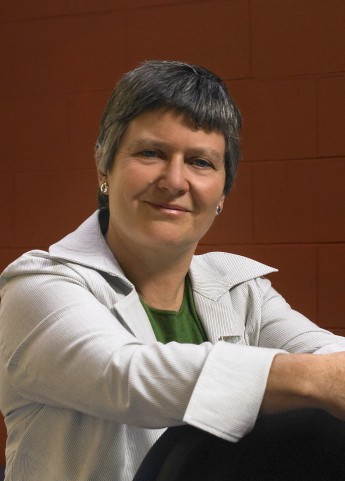
- Fleming in 2008
- Born: Jean Sutherland Fleming; 1952 (age 73–74)
- Education: University of Otago
- Relatives: Charles Fleming (father)
- Awards: New Zealand Suffrage Centennial Medal 1993; Companion of the Royal Society of New Zealand (2011)
- Scientific career
- Fields: Reproductive biology, science communication
- Workplaces: University of Otago

Jean Sutherland Fleming ONZM CRSNZ (born 1952) is a New Zealand reproductive biologist, science communication advocate and environmentalist. She has been a professor emerita in science communication since her retirement from the University of Otago in 2014.

== Education ==
Fleming was born in 1952, the daughter of scientist Charles Fleming and Margaret Alison Fleming (née Chambers). She obtained her BSc in biochemistry from Victoria University of Wellington in 1973 and her MSc in clinical biochemistry from the University of Otago in 1981. She then completed a PhD in reproductive biology at the University of Otago in 1986, focusing on the gonadotrophin-releasing hormone.

== Career ==
Fleming joined the University of Otago as a lecturer in physiology in 1994, working on ovulation and ovarian cancer. She led the programme committee for the first New Zealand International Science Festival (NZISF) in 1997, and received life membership of the NZISF in 2012.

Fleming held the role of professor of science communication at the University of Otago's Centre for Science Communication from 2008 until 2013. She retired from the University of Otago in 2014, and was conferred with the title of professor emerita.

In 2000, Fleming was appointed to New Zealand’s Royal Commission on Genetic Modification (RCGM).

Fleming was a regular guest on Brian Crump’s National Radio show.

== Honours and awards ==
Fleming was awarded the Zonta Science Award 1990, the New Zealand Suffrage Centennial Medal 1993. In the 2002 Queen's Birthday and Golden Jubilee Honours, she was appointed an Officer of the New Zealand Order of Merit, for services to science. She was elected a Companion of the Royal Society of New Zealand in 2011.
