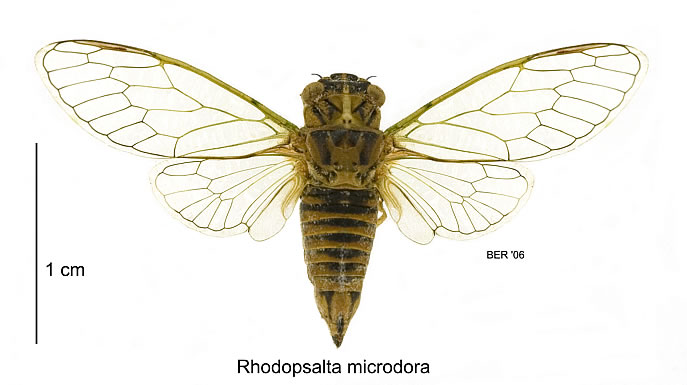
- Female
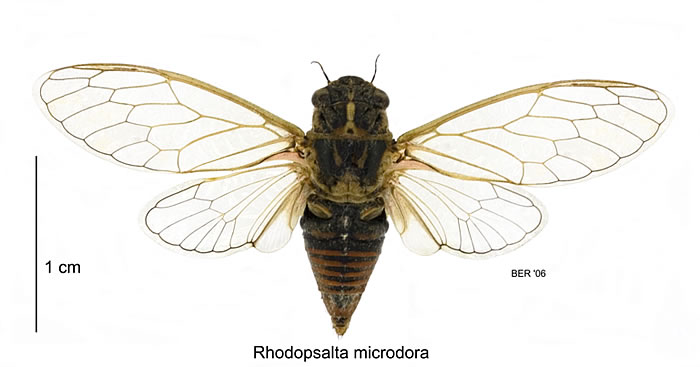
- Male

Scientific classification
- Kingdom: Animalia
- Phylum: Arthropoda
- Clade: Pancrustacea
- Class: Insecta
- Order: Hemiptera
- Suborder: Auchenorrhyncha
- Family: Cicadidae
- Genus: Rhodopsalta
- Species: R. microdora

Binomial name
- Rhodopsalta microdora (Hudson, 1936)

Synonyms
- Melampsalta microdora Hudson, 1936

= Rhodopsalta microdora =

Species of true bug

Rhodopsalta microdora, also known as the little redtail cicada, is a species of insect that is endemic to New Zealand. This species was first described in 1936 by George Vernon Hudson and named Melampsalta microdora.
