= Sigapatella terraenovae =

Scientific classification
- Kingdom: Animalia
- Phylum: Mollusca
- Class: Gastropoda
- Subclass: Caenogastropoda
- Order: Littorinimorpha
- Family: Calyptraeidae
- Genus: Sigapatella
- Species: S. terraenovae

Binomial name
- Sigapatella terraenovae (Peile, A.J., 1924)

Synonyms
- Sigapatella crater Finlay, H.J., 1927; Trochita alta Hutton, 1885; Zegalerus crater Finlay, 1927; Zegalerus terraenovae (Peile, 1924)

Species of gastropod

Sigapatella terraenovae is a species of sea snail, a marine gastropod mollusc in the family Calyptraeidae.

== Distribution ==
This species is endemic to New Zealand.
