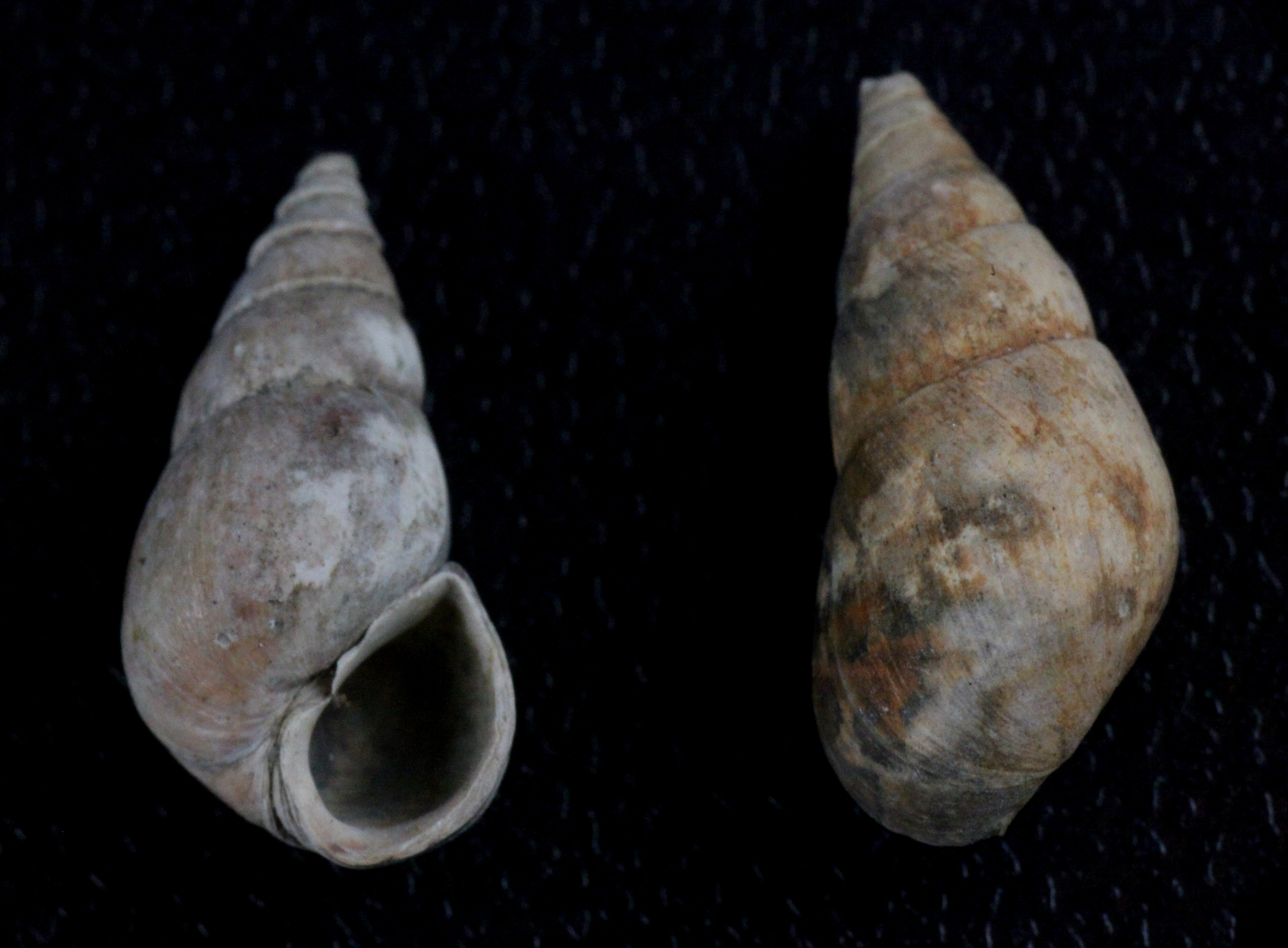

Scientific classification
- Kingdom: Animalia
- Phylum: Mollusca
- Class: Gastropoda
- Family: Pyramidellidae
- Genus: Odostomia
- Species: O. tenuis

Binomial name
- Odostomia tenuis Carpenter, 1856

Synonyms
- Evalea tenuis Carpenter, 1856; Odostomia (Evalea) tenuis Carpenter, 1856

= Odostomia tenuis =

Species of gastropod

Odostomia tenuis is a species of sea snail, a marine gastropod mollusc in the family Pyramidellidae, the pyrams and their allies.

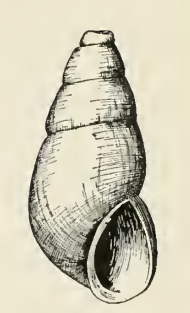
Apertural view of shell of Odostomia tenuis
