= Chromodoris tenuis =

Scientific classification
- Kingdom: Animalia
- Phylum: Mollusca
- Class: Gastropoda
- Order: Nudibranchia
- Family: Chromodorididae
- Genus: Chromodoris
- Species: C. tenuis

Binomial name
- Chromodoris tenuis Collingwood, 1881

Species of gastropod

Chromodoris tenuis is a species of colourful sea slug, a marine gastropod mollusk, a nudibranch in the family Chromodorididae. The scientific name of the species was first published in 1881 by Collingwood.

== Distribution ==
This species was described from Fiery Cross Reef, China Sea.

== Description ==
Described by Collingwood as follows:

Length 19 mm (0.75 in) inch. Body long and slender, very attenuated when in motion. Mantle entire, covering the whole body, excepting the posterior portion of the foot; broad and squarish in front, and narrower from behind the tentacles backwards, bluntly pointed posteriorly. Dorsal tentacles short and club-shaped, laminated, the suture anterior. Branchiae small, consisting of seven small and simple leaflets arranged in a circle, the anterior leaflet somewhat larger than the others, and the posterior pair smallest. Foot long and narrow, slightly tubular, projecting beyond the mantle posteriorly.

Colour and general appearance. Mantle opaque white with a slight tinge of yellow, especially on the anterior portion, edged with chrome-yellow, slightly shading off interiorly. The whole mantle is covered with minute roundish spots of carmine, irregularly distributed, absent only from the most anterior portion, the spots varying in size from mere specks to roundish definite spots. Tentacles yellowish, but not so bright as the border of the mantle; the bases whitish. Branchiae pale yellow. Foot edged with chrome posteriorly, like the mantle. Under surface yellowish, foot and mantle with a faint edging of chrome-yellow, the carmine spots showing through at the sides of the head.

It has been suggested that this species is a synonym of Chromodoris aspersa but in view of the discovery that C. aspersa is really a species complex it is possible that C. tenuis can be re-established as a separate species.
