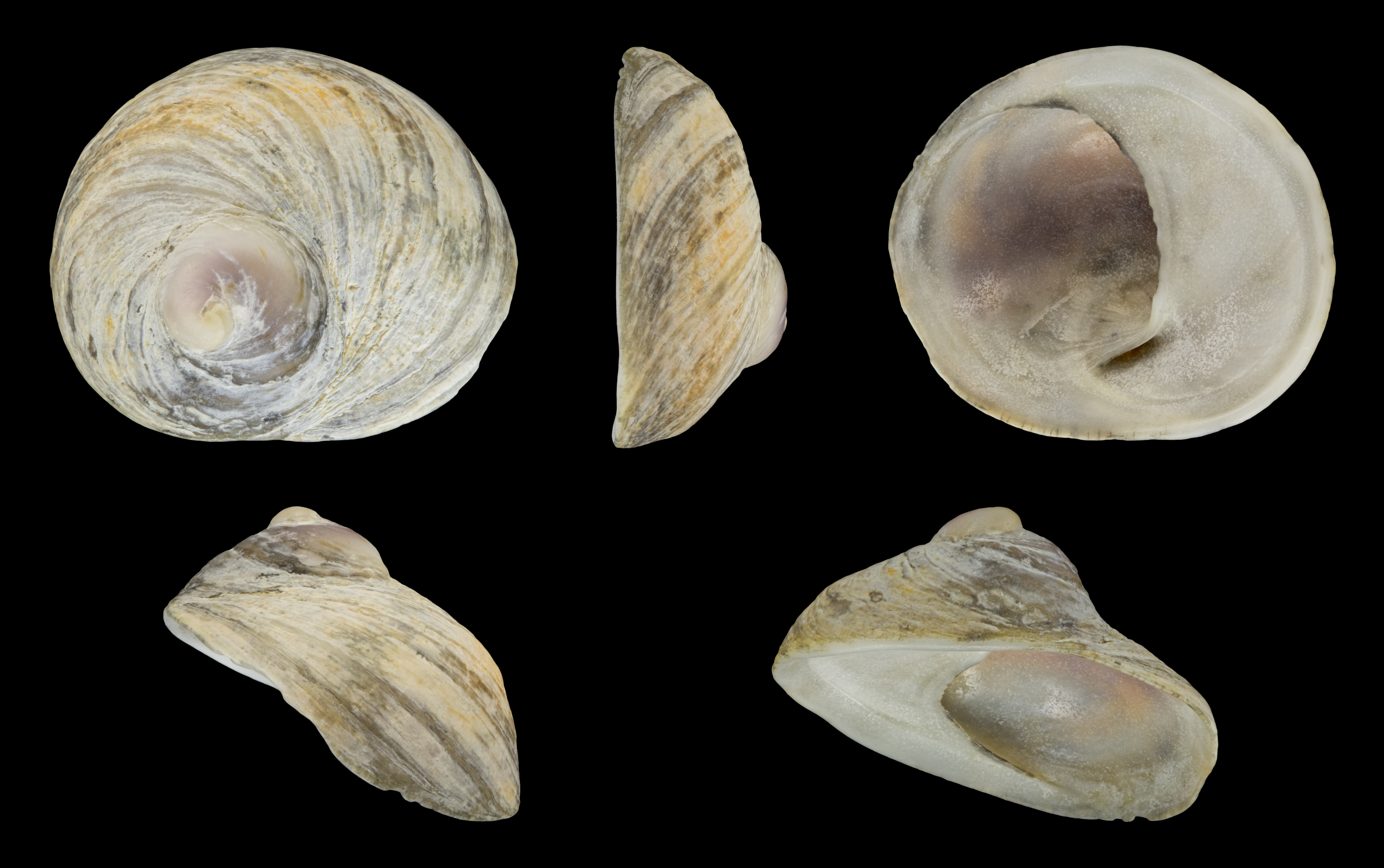

Scientific classification
- Kingdom: Animalia
- Phylum: Mollusca
- Class: Gastropoda
- Subclass: Caenogastropoda
- Order: Littorinimorpha
- Family: Calyptraeidae
- Genus: Sigapatella
- Species: S. novaezelandiae

Binomial name
- Sigapatella novaezelandiae (Lesson, 1831)

Synonyms
- Calyptraea alta Odhner, N.H.J., 1924; Calyptraea calyptraeiformis Lamarck; † Calyptraea inflata Hutton, 1893; Calyptraea novaezelandiae Lesson, 1831; Crepidula maculata Quoy and Gaimard, 1835; Crepidula novaezelandiae Iredale, 1915; Sigapatella maculata Suter, H., 1913

= Sigapatella novaezelandiae =

Species of gastropod

Sigapatella novaezelandiae, common name the circular slipper limpet, is a species of medium-sized sea snail, a marine gastropod molluscs in the family Calyptraeidae.

== Description ==
The size of an adult shell varies between 15 mm and 33 mm. The white or yellowish-white shell is marked by growth lines. The spire is often light violaceous. The shell is covered by a thin, fibrous, yellowish periostracum. The interior of the shell is white, more or less stained or blotched with violet.

== Distribution ==
This marine species is endemic to New Zealand.
