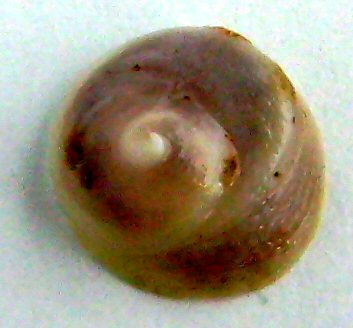
- Dorsal view of a shell of Sigapatella novaezelandiae

Scientific classification
- Kingdom: Animalia
- Phylum: Mollusca
- Class: Gastropoda
- Subclass: Caenogastropoda
- Order: Littorinimorpha
- Family: Calyptraeidae
- Genus: Sigapatella; Lesson, 1831

Type species
- Sigapatella novaezelandiae Lesson, R.P., 1830

Species
- See text

Synonyms
- Clypeola Gray, 1868; Sigapatella (Sigapatella) Lesson, 1831 · accepted, alternate representation; Sigapatella (Spirogalerus) Finlay & Marwick, 1937 · accepted, alternate representation; Trochella Gray 1867; Zegalerus Finlay, 1926

= Sigapatella =

Genus of gastropods

Sigapatella is a genus of small to medium-sized sea snails, marine gastropod molluscs in the family Calyptraeidae, the slipper snails, Chinese hat snails, and cup-and-saucer snails.

== Taxonomy ==
This group of species was originally classified under Calyptraea (Sigapatella) by Lesson in 1830. In 1990 the subgenus was elevated to the rank of genus as Sigapatella by Beu et al. and confirmed in 2000 by Camacho et al. (2000).

== Description ==
The oval shell has a lateral apex. The interior plate has a submarginal axis. The free margin is concave.

== Species ==
Species within the genus Sigapatella include:

- † Sigapatella americana Ortmann 1900
- Sigapatella calyptraeformis (Lamarck)
- † Sigapatella crater (Finlay, 1926)
- † Sigapatella gigantea (Beu, 1970)
- Sigapatella hedleyi (Smith, 1915) Hedley's shelf limpet
- † Sigapatella maccoyi (Suter, 1917)
- † Sigapatella mapalia Marwick, 1929
- Sigapatella novaezelandiae (Lesson, 1830)
- Sigapatella nukumaruana Marshall, 2003
- Sigapatella ohopeana Marshall, 2003
- † Sigapatella otamatea Laws, 1944
- † Sigapatella patulosa Powell and Bartrum, 1929
- † Sigapatella perampla (Powell & Bartrum, 1929)
- Sigapatella spadicea Boshier, 1961
- † Sigapatella subvaricosa Powell & Bartrum, 1929
- Sigapatella superstes Fleming, 1958
- Sigapatella tenuis (Gray, 1867)
- Sigapatella terraenovae (Peile, 1924)
- Sigapatella subvaricosa Powell and Partrum, 1929
- † Sigapatella vertex J. Marwick, 1926

- † Sigapatella (Spirogalerus) lamellaria (Finlay & Marwick, 1937) (synonym: Spirogalerus lamellaria Finlay & Marwick 1937)

Species brought into synonymy

- Sigapatella maculata Suter, 1913 : synonym of Sigapatella novaezelandiae (Lesson, 1830)
