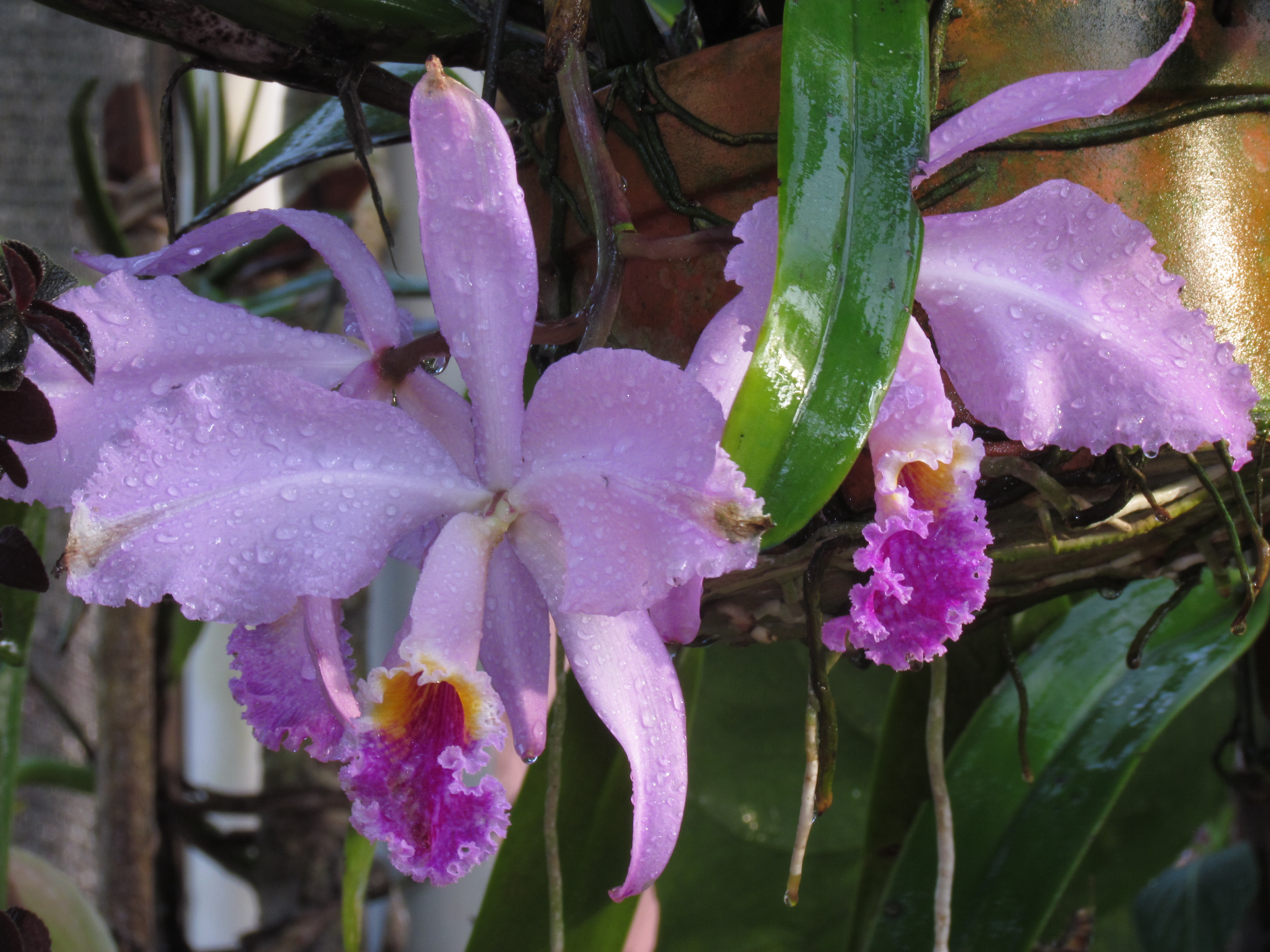

Scientific classification
- Kingdom: Plantae
- Clade: Tracheophytes
- Clade: Angiosperms
- Clade: Monocots
- Order: Asparagales
- Family: Orchidaceae
- Subfamily: Epidendroideae
- Genus: Cattleya
- Subgenus: Cattleya subg. Cattleya
- Section: Cattleya sect. Cattleya
- Species: C. mossiae

Binomial name
- Cattleya mossiae C.Parker ex Hook.

Synonyms
- Cattleya labiata var. mossiae (C.Parker ex Hook.) Lindl.; Cattleya wageneri Rchb.f.; Cattleya labiata var. reineckeana Rchb.f.; Cattleya reineckiana Rchb.f.; Epidendrum labiatum var. reineckeanum (Rchb.f.) Rchb.f.; Epidendrum labiatum var. mossiae (C.Parker ex Hook.) Rchb.f.; Epidendrum labiatum var. wageneri (Rchb.f.) Rchb.f.; Cattleya carrierei Houllet; Cattleya mossiae var. hardyana B.S.Williams & T.Moore; Cattleya mossiae var. reineckeana Rchb.f. ex O'Brien; Cattleya mossiae var. decora B.S.Williams; Cattleya edithiana R.Warner ex B.S.Williams; Cattleya aliciae Linden; Cattleya mossiae var. coerulea Cogn.; Cattleya mossiae var. beyrodtiana Schltr.; Cattleya mossiae var. wageneri Braem; Cattleya mossiae f. coerulea (Cogn.) M.Wolff & O.Gruss; Cattleya mossiae f. reineckeana (Rchb.f. ex O'Brien) M.Wolff & O.Gruss; Cattleya mossiae f. wageneri (Rchb.f.) M.Wolff & O.Gruss

= Cattleya mossiae =

Species of orchid

Cattleya mossiae (literally 'Moss' Cattleya'), commonly known as the Easter orchid, is a species of labiate Cattleya orchid. The white-flowered form is sometimes known as Cattleya wagneri. The diploid chromosome number of C. mossiae has been determined as 2n = 40. The haploid chromosome number has been determined as n = 20.

It is among the group of very fragrant orchids.
