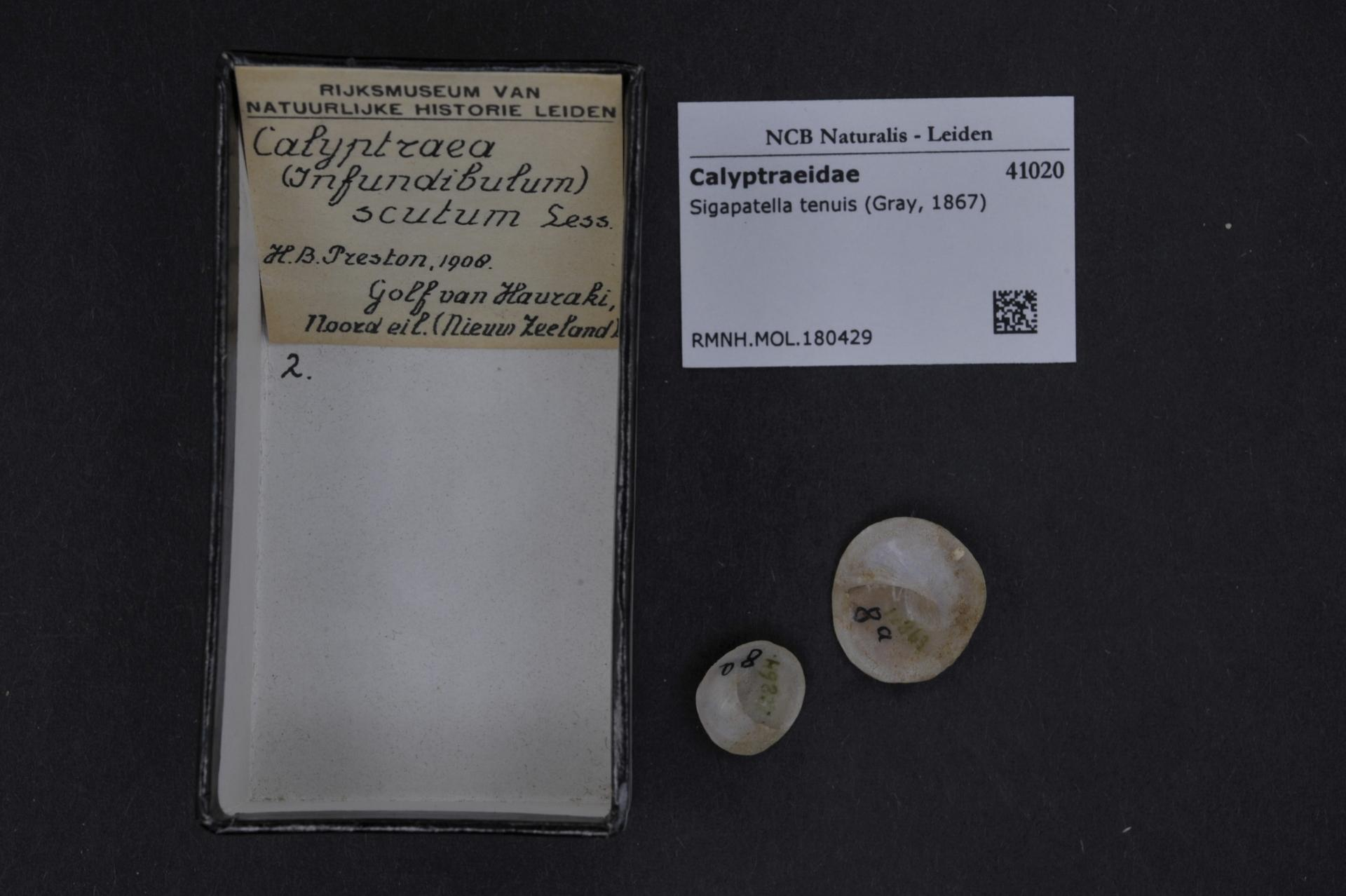

Scientific classification
- Kingdom: Animalia
- Phylum: Mollusca
- Class: Gastropoda
- Subclass: Caenogastropoda
- Order: Littorinimorpha
- Family: Calyptraeidae
- Genus: Sigapatella
- Species: S. tenuis

Binomial name
- Sigapatella tenuis (Gray, 1867)

Synonyms
- Clypeola tenuis (Gray, 1867) (basionym)

= Sigapatella tenuis =

Species of gastropod

Sigapatella tenuis is a species of sea snail, a marine gastropod mollusc in the family Calyptraeidae, the slipper snails, Chinese hat snails and cup-and-saucer snails. It is found in New Zealand.
