= Charles Alexander Fleming =

New Zealand ornithologist, paleontologist and environmentalist (1916–1987)

Sir Charles Fleming KBE, FRS FRSNZ FRAOU
- Born: 9 September 1916; Auckland, New Zealand
- Died: 11 September 1987 (aged 71); Wellington, New Zealand
- Education: University of Auckland
- Occupations: Paleontologist, Ornithologist
- Spouse: Peg Chambers
- Children: 3, including Jean Fleming
- Awards: Knight Commander of the Order of the British Empire
- Scientific career
- Fields: Ornithology

Sir Charles Alexander Fleming KBE FRS FRSNZ FRAOU (9 September 1916 – 11 September 1987) was a New Zealand geologist, ornithologist, molluscan palaeontologist and environmentalist. He spent the last twenty years of his life studying the evolution and systematics of New Zealand cicadas.

Fleming was a Coastwatcher on the Cape Expedition in the Auckland Islands from 1942–1943 during World War II. Fleming graduated from the University of Auckland in 1952 with a doctoral thesis on the geology of Whanganui.

He was active in the Save Manapouri Campaign, was a spokesperson for Native Forest Action Council and the Royal Forest and Bird Protection Society of New Zealand. He was elected to the American Philosophical Society in 1973. In 1974 he was elected a Fellow of the Royal Australasian Ornithologists Union. He was also trustee of the Ngā Manu Nature Reserve.

Mount Fleming in Antarctica is named after him.

In 1988 the Royal Society of New Zealand established the Charles Fleming Award which is awarded to individuals who have achieved distinction in the protection, maintenance, management, improvement, or understanding of the environment.

Sir Charles Fleming has been honoured by having dozens of species named after him, mostly Mollusca, but also Foraminifera and Echinodermata: e.g. Alcithoe flemingi Dell, 1978; Austrodiaphana flemingi A. W. B. Powell, 1955; Austrotindaria flemingi Dell, 1956; Cellana strigilis flemingi A. W. B. Powell, 1955; Condylocuna flemingi P. A. Maxwell, 1969 †; Diploporaster flemingi Henderson, 1975 †; Gaimardia flemingi Zinsmeister, 1984 †; Gaimardia trapesina flemingi A. W. B. Powell, 1955; Galeodea (Galeoocorys) flemingi Beu & P. A. Maxwell, 1990 †; Gavelinella flemingi Stoneley, 1962 †; Globisinum flemingi A. W. B. Powell, 1931 †; Haliotis flemingi A. W. B. Powell, 1938 †; Kalentera flemingi Marwick, 1953 †; Kerguelenella flemingi A. W. B. Powell, 1955; Longimactra flemingi Marwick, 1960 †; Macrosinus flemingi Beu, 1970 †; Maorithyas flemingi A. W. B. Powell, 1955; Mosasaurus flemingi Wiffen, 1990 †; Nonion flemingi Vella, 1957; Opalia (Pliciscala) flemingi Beu, 2011 †; Parathyasira flemingi P. A. Maxwell, 1992 †; Pseudechinus flemingi Fell, 1958; Pseudoinquisitor flemingi Vella, 1954 †; Pterynotus flemingi Beu, 1967; Rissoella flemingi Ponder, 1968; Scaphander flemingi Marwick, 1965 †; Sphaerostoma flemingi A. W. B. Powell, 1937; Struthiolaria (Pelicaria) vermis flemingi Neef, 1970; Tatara flemingi Beu & P. A. Maxwell, 1987 †; Thieleella flemingi B. A. Marshall, 2002; Tortoflabellum flemingi Squires, 1958 †;Xenophora flemingi Beu, 1977 †; Zeacolpus flemingi Marwick, 1971 †; Zenatia flemingi Marwick, 1948 †.

In 1997, Trevor H. Worthy commemorated Charles Fleming in the species' epithet of the prehistoric rail Pleistorallus flemingi from the mid-Pleistocene of New Zealand.

In the 1964 New Year Honours, Fleming was appointed an Officer of the Order of the British Empire. He was promoted to Knight Commander of the Order of the British Empire in the 1977 New Year Honours, for services to science and conservation.

Charles Fleming was married to Margaret Alison Fleming (nee Chambers) from 1941 until his death in 1987, and they had three daughters, Robin Fleming, Winifred Mary McEwen and Jean Fleming. In 2012 the Charles Fleming Retirement Village was named after Fleming. The name of the village was unveiled by two of his daughters.
