= J. G. Myers =

British entomologist (1897–1942)

John Golding Myers (22 October 1897 – 3 February 1942) was a British entomologist and botanist. Born near Rugby, Warwickshire, he worked in New Zealand on biological control, followed by work in the UK, the Caribbean and Latin America before moving to Sudan as Government Botanist. He died in Sudan at the age of 44.

== Life and career ==
In 1911 Myers' parents moved to New Zealand, where he did well at school, winning a scholarship to Victoria University College in Wellington. During the First World War he served in Europe in the New Zealand Expeditionary Force. Afterwards, he returned to Wellington to complete his studies, obtaining the B.Sc. and M.Sc degrees. From 1919 until 1924 Myers was employed as entomologist in the Biological Division of the New Zealand Department of Agriculture, where he worked on the cattle tick and other pests.

In 1922, Myers married Iris H. Woodhouse in Wellington, with whom he had two daughters and a son.

In 1924 Myers won the coveted honour of an 1851 Exhibition Scholarship for New Zealand and elected to go to Harvard University. There he worked at the entomological laboratory of the Bussey Institution, eventually obtaining the degree of Sc.D. In 1925 Myers came to England to represent the New Zealand Government at the Second Imperial Entomological Conference. Afterwards he went to France at the request of his government to study the natural enemies of the pear leaf-curling midge. In the following year he was appointed to the staff of the Imperial Institute of Entomology to organize the breeding of parasites of injurious insects for export to the Dominions and colonies of the British Empire. He did notable work on the parasites of the blow-fly and of the timber-infesting wood wasps, which made possible their export to Australia and New Zealand.

Myers next visited Australia to investigate the passage of dried fruit from the vine to the consumer and was successful in tracing the sources of insect infestation. In 1928 he went to Trinidad to study the possibilities of the biological control of sugar cane pests. He traveled all over the West Indies and to Guiana and Surinam in search of parasites and his report, published by the Empire Marketing Board, is full of information not only on insect pests and their parasites but also on the general ecology and agriculture of the countries he visited.

In 1929 he published his work on the cicada, Insect Singers: A Natural History of the Cicadas.

Myers' work in the West Indies continued up to 1934, when he joined the staff of the Imperial College of Tropical Agriculture in Trinidad. Here he under took a number of private expeditions at the request of various planters, collecting and studying the ecology of insect pests in parts of British Guiana, Venezuela and Brazil.

In 1937 Myers was appointed economic botanist to the government of Anglo-Egyptian Sudan, his task being to survey the economic possibilities of the southernmost province of Equatoria with a view to its future agricultural development. Only preliminary reports of this work are available, but they cover a great variety of subjects and show the usual thoroughness of his approach. Myers never completed the report, as he was killed in a motor accident near Amadi in Equatoria Province on 3 February.

Apart from his many papers on biological control and related topics, Myers produced a large number of works on insects of the order Hemiptera which showed him to be a morphologist and systematist of note.

== Other sources ==
- Nature Vol 149 April 11, 1942 pg 406 W. E. CHINA.
- CAB Reviews: Perspectives in Agriculture, Veterinary Science, Nutrition and Natural Resources, 2011, 6, 008, 1-18
- "Myers, John Golding (1897-1942)". JSTOR.org. Retrieved 2020-12-13.
