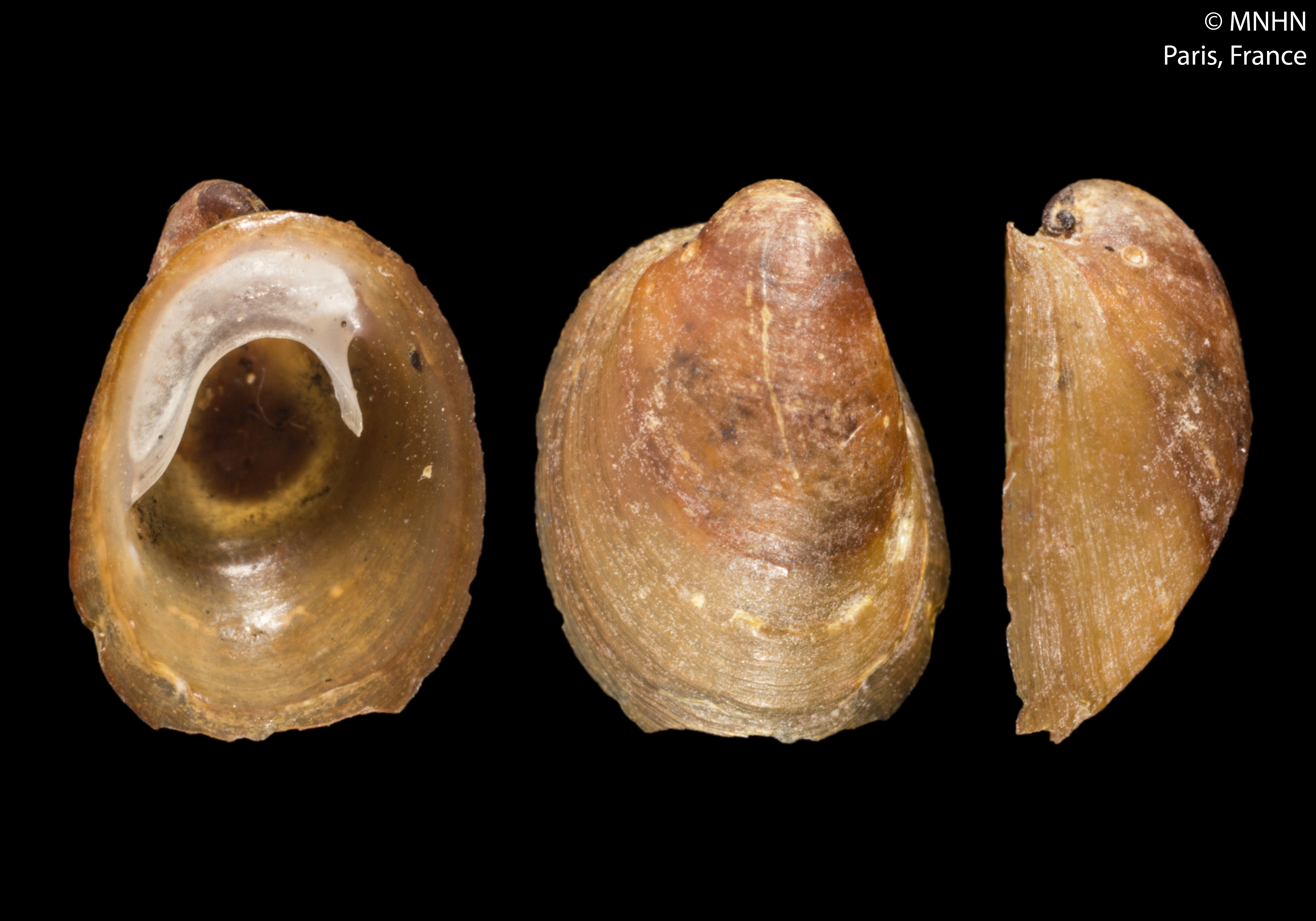
- Specimen of Crepidula neritoides

Scientific classification
- Kingdom: Animalia
- Phylum: Mollusca
- Class: Gastropoda
- Subclass: Caenogastropoda
- Order: Littorinimorpha
- Superfamily: Calyptraeoidea
- Family: Calyptraeidae
- Genus: Crepidula; Lamarck, 1799

Type species
- Patella fornicata Linnaeus, 1758

Synonyms
- Calyptraea (Syphopatella) Lesson, 1831; Crypta Gray, 1847; Crypta (Ergaea) H. Adams & A. Adams, 1854; Crypta (Ianacus) Mörch, 1852 · accepted, alternate representation; Garnotia Gray, 1857; Ianacus Mörch, 1852; Siphonipatella Agassiz, 1847 (unjustified emendation of Syphopatella); Siphopatella (incorrect subsequent spelling); Syphopatella Lesson, 1831

= Crepidula =

Genus of gastropods

Crepidula, commonly known as the slipper snails, slipper limpets, or slipper shells, is a genus of sea snails, marine gastropod mollusks in the family Calyptraeidae. This family includes the slipper snails (Crepidula), hat snails (Calyptraea), spiny slipper snails (Bostrycapulus), and cup-and-saucer snails (Crucibulum) as well as Crepipatella, Siphopatella, Grandicrepidula, and Maoricrypta.

These recent changes in the definition of Crepidula are based on both DNA sequence data as well as anatomical work. Dissections of various calyptraeids show that species that are now placed in Grandicrepidula and Maoricrypta are anatomically very different from the true Crepidula. If only the shells are examined, this difference is not apparent. This distinction is supported by DNA sequence data from three genes (COI, 16S and 28S).

The genus Crepidula is probably the best studied group within the calyptraeids. A variety of species are commonly used in developmental, ecological, and behavioral research. They have been the major focus of research on protandrous sex-change in marine invertebrates, and have been used to demonstrate that sex change is environmentally mediated (the timing of sex change depends on association with other individual snails). Crepidula fornicata and Crepidula onyx are well-studied examples of invasive, exotic species in marine habitats.

Due to their simple shells and plastic morphology, calyptraeid taxonomy is challenging. In many cases distinct species with similar-looking shells have been lumped into a single species with either global or unusual distributions. In these cases, close examination of the mode of development or of DNA data is vital to verify the species identity. Because such taxonomic lumping is difficult to clear from the internet or from the literature, many species range estimates available on the internet include dubious data or data from species that have been taken out of synonymy.

== Species ==
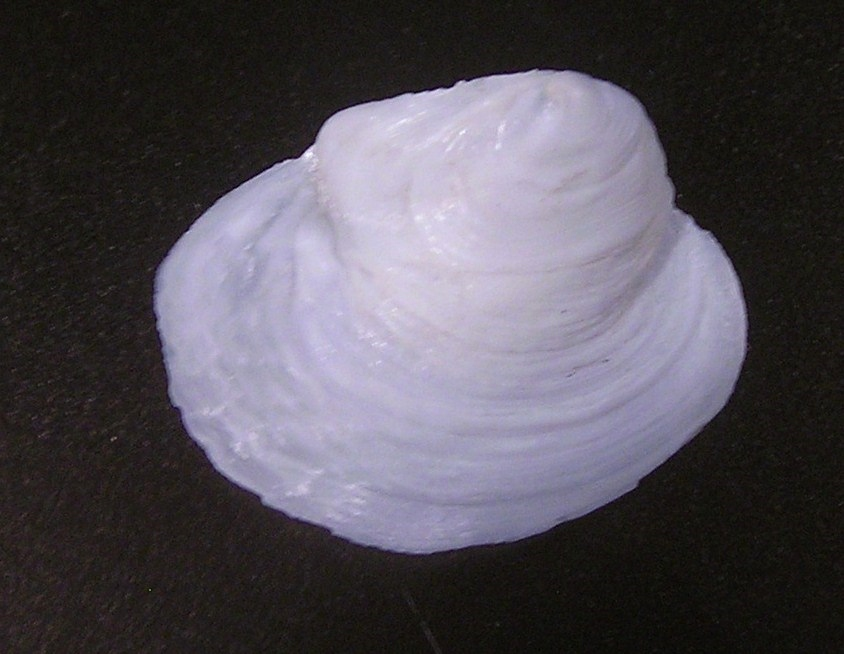
Crepidula walshi, now Siphopatella walshi

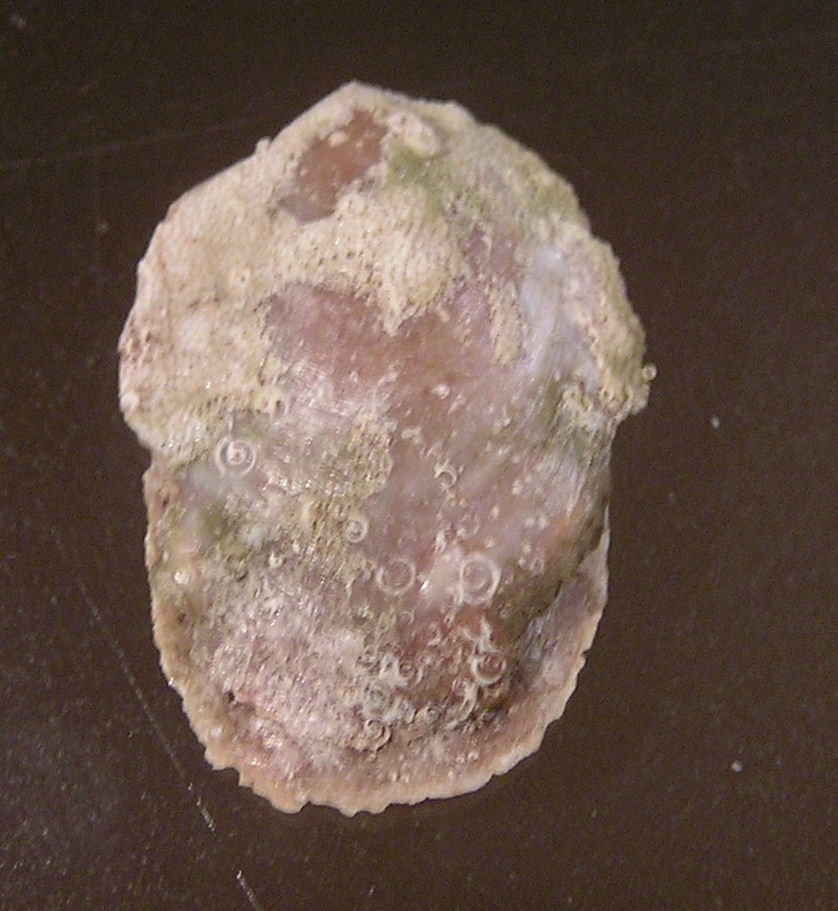
Crepidula immersa, now Maoricypta or Zeacrypta

Species within the genus Crepidula include:

- Crepidula adunca G. B. Sowerby I, 1825
- Crepidula aeola Dall, 1927
- Crepidula aplysioides Reeve, 1859
- Crepidula arenata Broderip, 1834
- Crepidula argentina Simone, Pastorino & Penchaszadeh, 2000
- Crepidula atrasolea Collin, 2000
- Crepidula badisparsa Collin, 2005
- Crepidula cachimilla Cledon, Simone & Penchaszadeh, 2004
- Crepidula carioca Simone, 2006
- Crepidula cerithicola (C.B.Adams, 1852)
- Crepidula complanata Krauss, 1848
- Crepidula convexa Say, 1822 - synonym: Crepidula glauca
- Crepidula coquimbensis Brown & Olivares, 1996
- Crepidula cymbaeformis Conrad, 1844
- Crepidula depressa Say, 1822
- Crepidula derjugini Golikov & Kussakin, 1962
- Crepidula excavata Broderip, 1834
- Crepidula fimbriata Reeve, 1859
- Crepidula fornicata (Linnaeus, 1758) - common slipper shell, common Atlantic slippersnail, boat shell, quarterdeck shell
- Crepidula glottidiarum Dall, 1905
- Crepidula goreensis Gmelin, 1791
- Crepidula huertae Collin, 2019
- Crepidula incurva (Broderip, 1834)
- Crepidula intratesta Simone, 2006
- Crepidula lessonii (Broderip, 1834)
- Crepidula maculosa Conrad, 1846
- Crepidula margarita Simone, 2006
- Crepidula marginalis Broderip, 1834
- Crepidula moulinsii Michaud, 1829
- Crepidula naticarum Williamson, 1905
- Crepidula navicella (Lesson, 1831)
- Crepidula navicula (Mörch, 1877)
- Crepidula nivea C.B. Adams, 1852
- Crepidula norrisiarum Williamson, 1905
- Crepidula nummaria Gould, 1846
- Crepidula onyx G. B. Sowerby I, 1824 - onyx slippersnail
- Crepidula perforans Valenciennes, 1846
- Crepidula philippiana Gallardo, 1977
- Crepidula plana Say, 1822
- Crepidula porcellana (Linnaeus, 1758)
- Crepidula protea (d'Orbigny, 1841)
- Crepidula pyguaia Simone, 2006
- Crepidula rostrata C. B. Adams, 1852
- Crepidula striolata Menke, 1851
- Crepidula unguiformis Lamarck, 1822
- Crepidula ustulatulina Collin, 2002
- Crepidula williamsi Coe, 1947
- Crepidula wolfae Collin, 2019

Species brought into synonymy

- Crepidula aculeata (Gmelin, 1791): synonym of Bostrycapulus aculeatus (Gmelin, 1791)
- Crepidula aculeata (Gmelin, 1791): sensu Zenetos et al. 2004: synonym of Bostrycapulus odites Collin, 2005
- Crepidula acuta H. C. Lea, 1842: synonym of Crepidula convexa Say, 1822
- Crepidula adspersa Dunker, 1846: synonym of Crepidula porcellana Lamarck, 1801
- Crepidula bilobata Reeve, 1859: synonym of Crepidula lingulata Gould, 1846: synonym of Crepipatella lingulata (Gould, 1846)
- Crepidula calceolina Deshayes, 1830: synonym of Crepidula unguiformis Lamarck, 1822
- Crepidula californica Tryon, 1886: synonym of Crepidula aculeata (Gmelin, 1791): synonym of Bostrycapulus aculeatus (Gmelin, 1791)
- Crepidula calyptraeiformis Deshayes, 1830: synonym of Bostrycapulus calyptraeiformis (Deshayes, 1830)
- Crepidula candida Risso, 1826: synonym of Crepidula unguiformis Lamarck, 1822
- Crepidula capensis Quoy & Gaimard, 1835: synonym of Crepipatella capensis (Quoy & Gaimard, 1835)
- Crepidula cataldi Parenzan, 1970: synonym of Crepidula unguiformis Lamarck, 1822
- Crepidula coei Berry, 1950: synonym of Crepidula naticarum Williamson, 1905
- Crepidula contorta Quoy & Gaimard, 1832: synonym of Maoricrypta monoxyla (Lesson, 1830)
- Crepidula costata G. B. Sowerby I, 1824: synonym of Maoricrypta costata (G. B. Sowerby I, 1824)
- Crepidula costata Deshayes, 1830: synonym of Maoricrypta costata (G. B. Sowerby I, 1824)
- Crepidula costulata Dunker, 1852: synonym of Crepidula incurva (Broderip, 1834)
- Crepidula crepidula (Linnaeus, 1767): synonym of Crepidula unguiformis Lamarck, 1822
- Crepidula depressa Deshayes, 1830: synonym of Crepidula dilatata Lamarck, 1822: synonym of Crepipatella dilatata (Lamarck, 1822)
- Crepidula deshayesii de Folin, 1867: synonym of Crepidula unguiformis Lamarck, 1822
- Crepidula desmoulinsi Locard, 1886: synonym of Crepidula moulinsii Michaud, 1829
- Crepidula dilatata Lamarck, 1822: synonym of Crepipatella dilatata (Lamarck, 1822)
- Crepidula dorsata (Broderip, 1834): synonym of Crepipatella dorsata (Broderip, 1834)
- Crepidula excisa Philippi, 1849: synonym of Ergaea walshi (Reeve, 1859)
- Crepidula explanata Gould, 1853: synonym of Crepidula perforans (Valenciennes, 1846)
- Crepidula exuviata Reeve, 1859: synonym of Crepidula perforans (Valenciennes, 1846)
- Crepidula fasciata de Roissy, 1805: synonym of Crepidula unguiformis Lamarck, 1822
- Crepidula fecunda Gallardo, 1979: synonym of Crepipatella peruviana (Lamarck, 1822)
- Crepidula fissurata G. B. Sowerby II, 1883: synonym of Crepipatella lingulata (Gould, 1846)
- Crepidula foliacea Broderip, 1834: synonym of Crepidula aculeata (Gmelin, 1791): synonym of Bostrycapulus aculeatus (Gmelin, 1791)
- Crepidula gibbosa Defrance, 1818: synonym of Crepidula moulinsii Michaud, 1829
- Crepidula glauca Say, 1822: synonym of Crepidula convexa Say, 1822
- Crepidula grandis Middendorff, 1849: synonym of Grandicrepidula grandis (Middendorff, 1849)
- Crepidula gravispinosa Kuroda & Habe, 1950: synonym of Crepidula aculeata (Gmelin, 1791): synonym of Bostrycapulus aculeatus (Gmelin, 1791)
- Crepidula hochstetteriana Wilkens, 1922 : synonym of † Maoricrypta radiata (Hutton, 1873)
- Crepidula immersa Angas, 1865: synonym of Maoricrypta immersa (Angas, 1865)
- Crepidula incurva Zittel, 1864: synonym of † Crepidula wilckensi Finlay, 1924 : synonym of Maoricrypta radiata (Hutton, 1873) †
- Crepidula italica Defrance, 1818: synonym of Crepidula unguiformis Lamarck, 1822
- Crepidula lamina H. C. Lea, 1843: synonym of Crepidula plana Say, 1822
- Crepidula lingulata Gould, 1846: synonym of Crepipatella lingulata (Gould, 1846)
- Crepidula lirata Reeve, 1859: synonym of Crepidula incurva (Broderip, 1834)
- Crepidula maculata Quoy & Gaimard, 1832: synonym for Sigapatella novaezelandiae
- Crepidula minuta Middendorff, 1849: synonym of Crepidula nummaria Gould, 1846
- Crepidula monoxyla (Lesson, 1831): synonym of Maoricrypta monoxyla (Lesson, 1830)
- Crepidula nautiloides Lesson, 1832: synonym of Crepipatella dilatata (Lamarck, 1822)
- Crepidula navicelloides Carpenter, 1864: synonym of Crepidula nummaria Gould, 1846
- Crepidula nebulata Mabille, 1895: synonym of Crepidula nivea C. B. Adams, 1852
- Crepidula orbella Yokoyama, 1920: synonym of Ergaea walshi (Reeve, 1859)
- Crepidula orbiculata Dall, 1919: synonym of Crepipatella orbiculata (Dall, 1919)
- Crepidula osculans C. B. Adams, 1852: synonym of Phenacolepas osculans (C. B. Adams, 1852)
- Crepidula pallida (Broderip, 1834): synonym of Calyptraea pallida Broderip, 1834
- Crepidula patagonica d'Orbigny, 1841: synonym of Crepipatella patagonica (d'Orbigny, 1841)
- Crepidula patula Deshayes, 1830: synonym of Crepipatella peruviana (Lamarck, 1822)
- Crepidula peruviana Lamarck, 1822: synonym of Crepipatella peruviana (Lamarck, 1822)
- Crepidula plana (A. Adams & Reeve, 1850): synonym of Ergaea walshi (Reeve, 1859)
- Crepidula pulchella Aradas, 1846: synonym of Crepidula unguiformis Lamarck, 1822
- Crepidula rhyssema Olsson & Harbison, 1953: synonym of Crepidula plana Say, 1822
- Crepidula riisei Dunker, 1852: synonym of Crepidula fornicata (Linnaeus, 1758)
- Crepidula rostriformis Gould, 1846: synonym of Crepidula adunca G. B. Sowerby I, 1825
- Crepidula rugosa Carpenter, 1856: synonym of Crepidula onyx G. B. Sowerby I, 1824
- Crepidula rugulosa Dunker, 1846: synonym of Crepipatella capensis (Quoy & Gaimard, 1835)
- Crepidula sandaliformis de Serres, 1830: synonym of Crepidula unguiformis Lamarck, 1822
- Crepidula sandalina Deshayes, 1833: synonym of Crepidula unguiformis Lamarck, 1822
- Crepidula scabies Reeve, 1859: synonym of Ergaea walshi (Reeve, 1859)
- Crepidula sinuosa Turton, 1825: synonym of Crepidula unguiformis Lamarck, 1822
- Crepidula solida Hinds, 1844: synonym of Crepidula adunca G. B. Sowerby I, 1825
- Crepidula squama (Broderip, 1834): synonym of Crepidula striolata Menke, 1851
- Crepidula strigellata Dunker, 1853: synonym of Crepidula striolata Menke, 1851
- Crepidula sulin Dautzenberg, 1912: synonym of Crepidula porcellana Lamarck, 1801
- Crepidula tomentosa Quoy & Gaimard, 1832: synonym of Crepidula aculeata (Gmelin, 1791): synonym of Bostrycapulus aculeatus (Gmelin, 1791)
- Crepidula uncata Menke, 1847: synonym of Crepidula adunca G. B. Sowerby I, 1825
- Crepidula uncinata Philippi, 1887: synonym of Crepidula dilatata Lamarck, 1822: synonym of Crepipatella dilatata (Lamarck, 1822)
- Crepidula virginica Conrad, 1871: synonym of Crepidula fornicata (Linnaeus, 1758)
- Crepidula walshi Reeve, 1859: synonym of Ergaea walshi (Reeve, 1859)
- † Crepidula wilckensi Finlay, 1924: synonym of † Maoricrypta radiata (Hutton, 1873)
- Crepidula youngi (Powell, 1940): synonym of Maoricrypta youngi Powell, 1940

Species that were previously placed in the genus Crepidula but have subsequently been removed from the genus on the basis of work by Bruce Marshall of the Te Papa Museum and Rachel Collin of the Smithsonian Institution include the following:

Now Maoricrypta:

- Crepidula costata: synonym for Maoricrypta costata - ribbed slipper shell
- Crepidula youngi (Powell, 1940)
- Crepidula wilckensi Finlay, 1924
- Crepidula immersa G. F. Angas, 1867

Now Grandicrepidula:

- Crepidula grandis Middendorff, 1849: synonym of Grandicrepidula grandis (Middendorff, 1849)
- Grandicrepidula collinae Marshall

Now Siphopatella:

- Crepidula walshi L. A. Reeve, 1859

Synonyms:

- Crepidula maculata Quoy & Gaimard, 1832: synonym of Crepidula aculeata (Gmelin, 1791)

== Ecology ==
Like all calyptraeids, slipper snails are sedentary filter-feeders. Adults use their large gill to capture microalgae from suspension, but there is some evidence that small juveniles can also use the radula to scrape algae from the substrate.

== Introduced and invasive Crepidula species ==
Crepidula fornicata - Native to the east coast of North America and ranging from Florida north into Canada. This species is now widespread and considered highly invasive along the north coast of Spain and France, along much of England's coastline and into the North Sea. It has also been reported from San Francisco Bay, Puget Sound and the Mediterranean Sea.

Crepidula convexa - Native to the east coast of North America and ranging from South Carolina to New England. This species has been reported from Puget Sound and San Francisco Bay.

Crepidula onyx - Native to the Southern coast of California and northern Pacific coast of Mexico. This species is now widespread and considered highly invasive in Asia. It has been reported from Korea, Japan and Hong Kong.
