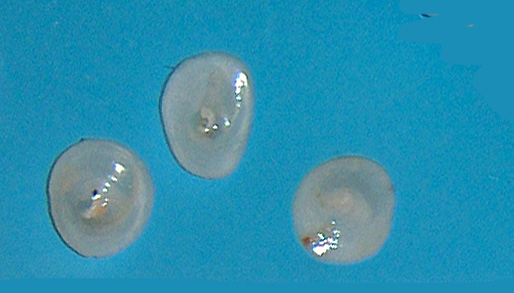
- Three shells of Calyptraea chinensis

Scientific classification
- Kingdom: Animalia
- Phylum: Mollusca
- Class: Gastropoda
- Subclass: Caenogastropoda
- Order: Littorinimorpha
- Superfamily: Calyptraeoidea
- Family: Calyptraeidae
- Genus: Calyptraea; Lamarck, 1799

Type species
- Patella chinensis Linnaeus, 1758

Synonyms
- † Calyptraea (Turbocalyptraea) Eames, 1957 · accepted, alternate representation; Galerus Gray, 1847

= Calyptraea =

Genus of gastropods

Calyptraea, commonly known as the Chinese hat snails, is a genus of sea snails, marine gastropod mollusks in the family Calyptraeidae, a family which contains the slipper snails or slipper limpets, cup-and-saucer snails, and Chinese hat snails.

== Species ==
Species within the genus Calyptraea include:

- Calyptraea africana Rolán, 2004
- † Calyptraea alta (Conrad, 1854)
- Calyptraea aurita Reeve, 1859
- Calyptraea barnardi Kilburn, 1980
- Calyptraea burchi Smith & Gordon, 1948
- Calyptraea capensis Tomlin, 1931
- Calyptraea centralis (Conrad, 1841)
- Calyptraea chinensis (Linnaeus, 1758)
- Calyptraea conica Broderip, 1834
- Calyptraea contorta (Carpenter, 1864)
- Calyptraea edgariana Melvill, 1898
- Calyptraea fastigiata Gould, 1846
- Calyptraea helicoidea (G. B. Sowerby II, 1883)
- Calyptraea inexpectata Rolán, 2004
- Calyptraea lichen Broderip, 1834
- Calyptraea mamillaris Broderip, 1834
- Calyptraea pellucida (Reeve, 1859)
- † Calyptraea primogenita Kiel, 2003 (taxon inquirendum)
- Calyptraea renovata (Crosse & P. Fischer, 1890)
- Calyptraea sakaguchii Kuroda & Habe, 1961
- Calyptraea spinifera (Gray, 1867)
- Calyptraea spirala (Forbes, 1852)
- Calyptraea subreflexa (Carpenter, 1856)
- † Calyptraea trochiformis Lamarck, 1804
- Calyptraea ventricosa (Carpenter, 1857)
- Calyptraea yokoyamai Kuroda, 1929

Species brought into synonymy

- Calyptraea aberrans C.B. Adams, 1852: synonym of Anomia peruviana d'Orbigny, 1846
- Calyptraea adolphei Lesson, 1831: synonym of Crepipatella dilatata (Lamarck, 1822)
- Calyptraea amygdalus Valenciennes, 1846: synonym of Crepidula onyx G.B. Sowerby I, 1824
- Calyptraea arenata Broderip, 1834: synonym of Crepidula excavata (Broderip, 1834)
- Calyptraea dormitoria Reeve, 1858: synonym of Cheilea dormitoria (Reeve, 1858)
- Calyptraea dorsata Broderip, 1834: synonym of Crepidula dorsata (Broderip, 1834)
- Calyptraea echinus Broderip, 1834: synonym of Crepidula aculeata (Gmelin, 1791)
- Calyptraea excavata Broderip, 1834: synonym of Crepidula excavata (Broderip, 1834)
- Calyptraea hystrix Broderip, 1834: synonym of Crepidula aculeata (Gmelin, 1791)
- Calyptraea incurva Broderip, 1834: synonym of Crepidula incurva (Broderip, 1834)
- Calyptraea lessonii Broderip, 1834: synonym of Crepidula lessonii (Broderip, 1834)
- Calyptraea marginalis Broderip, 1834: synonym of Crepidula marginalis (Broderip, 1834)
- Calyptraea monoxyla Lesson, 1831: synonym of Maoricrypta monoxyla (Lesson, 1831)
- Calyptraea plana A. Adams & Reeve, 1850: synonym of Crepidula walshi (Reeve, 1859)
- Calyptraea rugosa Carpenter, 1856: synonym of Crepidula onyx G.B. Sowerby I, 1824
- Calyptraea sinensis (Linnaeus, 1758): synonym of Calyptraea chinensis (Linnaeus, 1758)
- Calyptraea spinosa G. B. Sowerby I, 1824: synonym of Crucibulum spinosum (G. B. Sowerby I, 1824)
- Calyptraea squama Broderip, 1834: synonym of Crepidula striolata Menke, 1851
- Calyptraea strigata Broderip, 1834: synonym of Crepidula dilatata (Lamarck, 1822)
