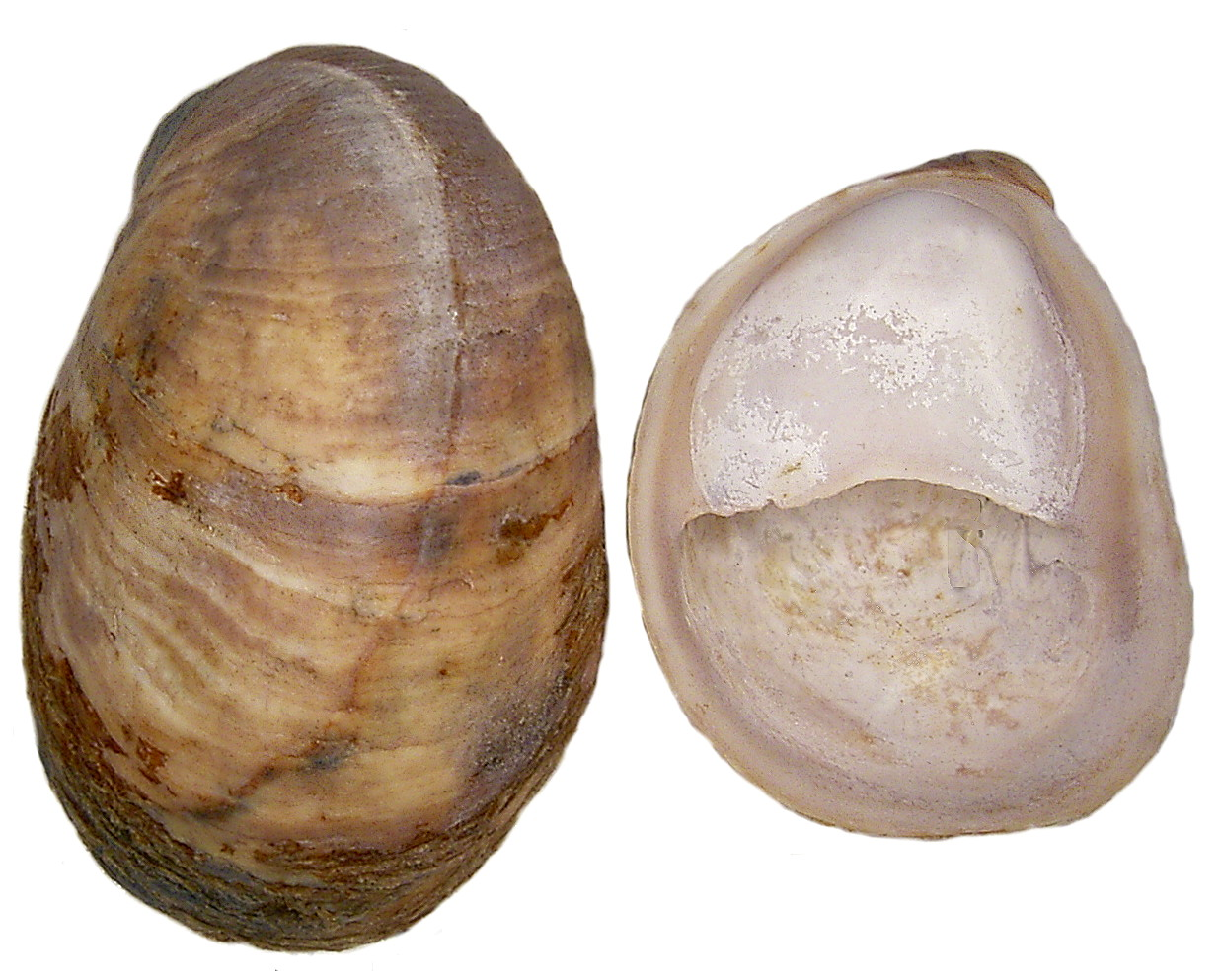

Scientific classification
- Kingdom: Animalia
- Phylum: Mollusca
- Class: Gastropoda
- Subclass: Caenogastropoda
- Order: Littorinimorpha
- Family: Calyptraeidae
- Genus: Crepidula
- Species: C. moulinsii

Binomial name
- Crepidula moulinsii Michaud, 1829

Synonyms
- Crepidula desmoulinsi Locard, 1886; Crepidula gibbosa Defrance, 1818 sensu Lamarck, 1822 (misidentification)

= Crepidula moulinsii =

Species of gastropod

Crepidula moulinsii is a species of sea snail, a marine gastropod mollusk in the family Calyptraeidae, the slipper snails or slipper limpets, cup-and-saucer snails, and Chinese pant snails.

== Distribution ==
This species occurs in the North Atlantic Ocean and in the Mediterranean Sea.
