= Crepidula badisparsa =

Scientific classification
- Kingdom: Animalia
- Phylum: Mollusca
- Class: Gastropoda
- Subclass: Caenogastropoda
- Order: Littorinimorpha
- Family: Calyptraeidae
- Genus: Crepidula
- Species: C. badisparsa

Binomial name
- Crepidula badisparsa Collin, 2005

Species of gastropod

Crepidula badisparsa is a species of sea snail, a marine gastropod mollusk in the family Calyptraeidae, the slipper snails or slipper limpets, cup-and-saucer snails, and Chinese hat snails.

It is a small species with flecks of tan and dark brown on the shell. It lives attached to other small gastropods in seagrass beds. This species is unusual in that in produces lecithotrophic larvae which hatch as large pediveligers. They swim for a short while before settling.

This species is currently found only in Panama.

== Background ==
The marine gastropod species, Crepidula badisparsa, is a part of the family Calyptraeidae and is one of the many species of slipper snails found off the coasts of Panama. The species' name comes from the Latin word "Badisparsa," which means scattered, referring to spots on the snail’s shell. They are also referred to as “Baby’s boats,” “Quarter-deck shells,” and “Lady’s slippers.” They are known for their plastic shells and simple and conservative anatomy.

== Distribution ==
Crepidula badisparsa is currently only found on the Atlantic Coast of Panama at depths between 1 and 2m, in shallow seagrass beds. Specifically, they have been found in Bocas del Toro Province, Cativa (Coco Solo), and Limon Bay, Panama. Other species of Crepidula have been found by themselves or attached to other snails, but further research is needed to determine whether Crepidula badisparsa live attached to other snails as well.

Due to its limited habitat range and location, little research has been done on Crepidula badisparsa’s ecological role within its habitat.

== Description ==
Crepidula badisparsa are small snails, with a maximum shell length of 13mm. Their shells are mainly white, with at least 50% covered in flecks and streaks of tan and dark brown. Snails in the family Crepidula have an expanded foot and a limpet-shaped shell. Their shells also lack muscle scars, and the shape of the individual's shell is determined by the substrate. Their shells also have a flat-shaped “shelf” that extends on the underside of the snail’s shell and houses the internal organs. Slipper snails like Crepidula have a posterior apex to their flattened shells and a slight lateral curve. Adult Crepidula badisparsa lack an operculum, a hard sheet that can be attached to the bottom of the snail's foot to plug the aperture. Crepidula badisparsa have splotches of yellow and cream on its tentacles, lips, and lappets on its neck. The back side of its head and neck are black and dark gray with black gills. The shell is attached to the body by a shell muscle extending from the front right portion of the foot to where the shell and shelf meet.

The taxonomy of Calyptraeidae is well recorded, as the similar morphological characteristics between individual species have made physical identification difficult. This has led to them becoming the subject of many biological and ecological studies, as the consistent taxonomic information makes them favorable subjects.

== Reproduction ==
Crepidula badisparsa reproduce sexually and exhibit protandrous hermaphroditism, meaning they are born male and develop into females as they grow. They lay eggs in transparent capsules that are 286 μm in length. Embryos receive nutrients solely from the yolk and develop vesicles near their heads, as well as an embryonic kidney on both sides of their body. Further details regarding embryonic development and brood size are currently unknown, however, larvae have been observed to hatch as pediveligers with transparent shells around 515 μm in length. Their intestines and velum are also transparent after hatching. Development into pediveligers is unique to this species, as no other members of Crepidula have been observed doing this.

== Diet (feeding habits) ==
All Crepidula are filter feeders and feed mainly on phytoplankton. An individual will use adjoining snails to lift itself off the substrate and then use its gills to create currents that trap phytoplankton. Along with this technique, Crepidula are known to create a mucus net from their gills that catch and transport their food into their food pouch. Crepidula also use their radula to transfer the food caught by the gills into the mouth. Crepidula’s feeding occurs in salinities at or above 20 psu.
