= Calyptraea centralis =

Scientific classification
- Kingdom: Animalia
- Phylum: Mollusca
- Class: Gastropoda
- Subclass: Caenogastropoda
- Order: Littorinimorpha
- Family: Calyptraeidae
- Genus: Calyptraea
- Species: C. centralis

Binomial name
- Calyptraea centralis (Conrad, 1841)

Species of gastropod

Calyptraea centralis is a species of sea snail of the family Calyptraeidae, a marine gastropod mollusk also known as the slipper snail, slipper limpet, cup-and-saucer snail, or Chinese hat snail.

== Description and habitat ==
The species' maximum recorded shell length is 15 mm (0.59 in). Calyptraea centralis has been recorded at depths from 0m to 183 m (600 ft).
