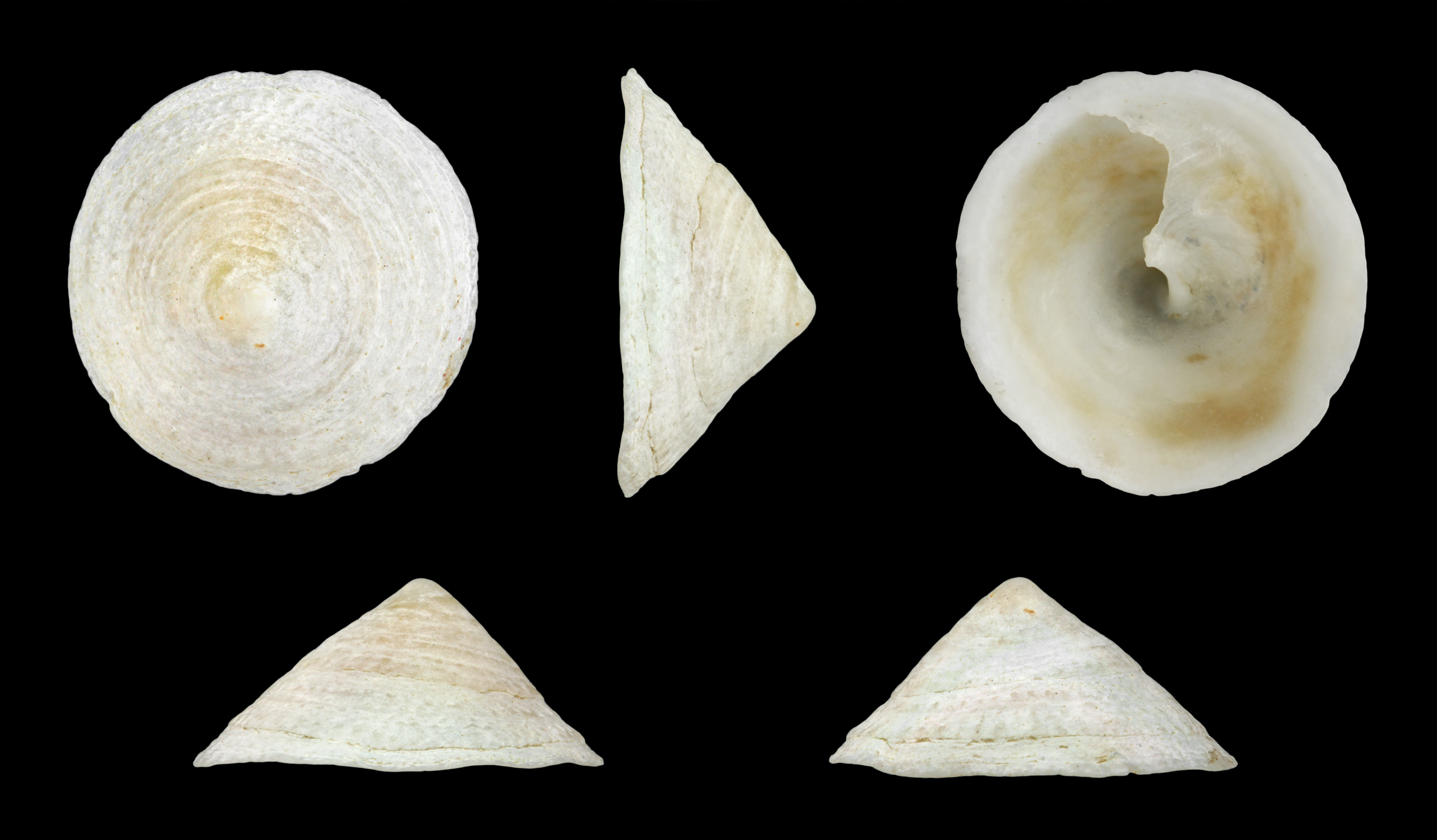

Scientific classification
- Kingdom: Animalia
- Phylum: Mollusca
- Class: Gastropoda
- Subclass: Caenogastropoda
- Order: Littorinimorpha
- Family: Calyptraeidae
- Genus: Calyptraea
- Species: C. chinensis

Binomial name
- Calyptraea chinensis (Linnaeus, 1758)

Synonyms
- Calyptraea sinensis (Linnaeus, 1758)

= Calyptraea chinensis =

Species of gastropod

Calyptraea chinensis, common name the Chinese hat snail or Chinese hat shell, is a species of small sea snail, a marine gastropod mollusk in the family Calyptraeidae, the slipper snails or slipper limpets, cup-and-saucer snails, and Chinese hat snails.

== Description ==
The thin shell of this species has the shape of an almost symmetrical cone (like a Chinese hat or conical Asian hat), 7 mm high and 15 – 21 mm wide. The internal partition has a spirally curved edge which runs running from the apex to the margin of the shell, and partly covers the aperture. The presence of this internal shelf distinguishes this species easily from the true limpets. The aperture is round and adapted to the substrate. The shell is creamy white, and glossy on the inside.

Calyptraea chinensis is a filter feeder, binding fine food particles with mucus. Like all slipper limpets, this species is a protandrous hermaphrodite, but the stages of change from male to female have not been clearly defined. Unlike Crepidula fornicata (the American slipper limpet), this species does not form stacks. The males and females only come together for copulation. The species does not have a pelagic larval phase. The veliger stage is passed in capsules fixed to the substrate, and guarded under the shell of the parent. The young hatch as crawling post-veliger larvae.

== Distribution ==
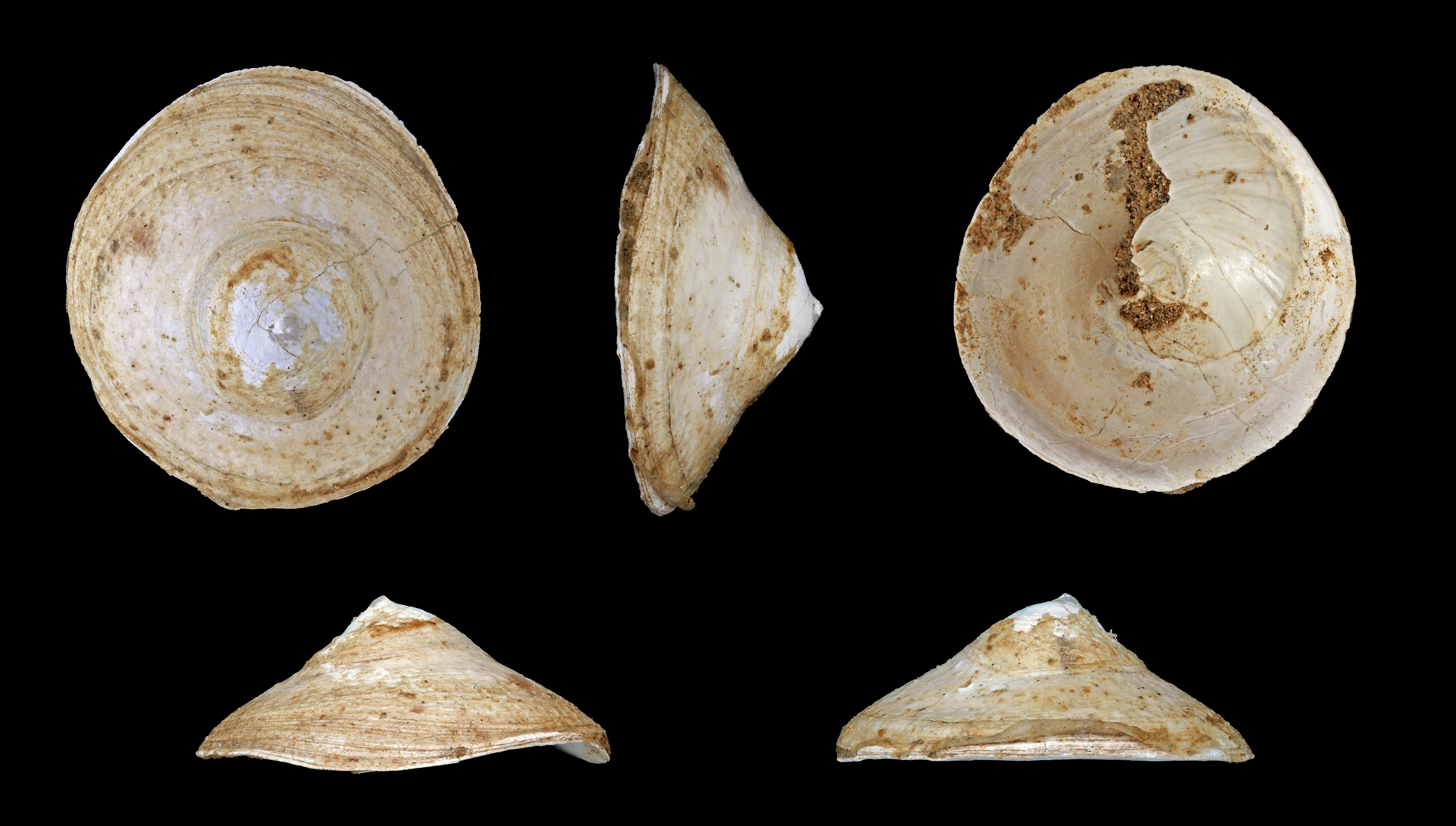
A fossil shell of Calyptraea chinensis from the Pliocene of Italy

Calyptraea chinensis occurs in North-West Africa, in the Mediterranean, the North Sea, the Black Sea and the Atlantic Ocean. These small snails can be found in the littoral and sublittoral zones along sheltered, rocky shores and on muddy or silty areas as long as they can cling to a hard substrate such as stones, living oysters and other shells. The species also occurs on the northern and western coasts of Britain and Ireland, but is absent from the North Sea and the English Channel.

Calyptraea chinensis is known in fossil state from the Pliocene and the Early Pleistocene.
