= Calyptraea inexpectata =

Scientific classification
- Kingdom: Animalia
- Phylum: Mollusca
- Class: Gastropoda
- Subclass: Caenogastropoda
- Order: Littorinimorpha
- Family: Calyptraeidae
- Genus: Calyptraea
- Species: C. inexpectata

Binomial name
- Calyptraea inexpectata Rolán, 2004

Species of gastropod

Calyptraea inexpectata is a species of sea snail, a marine gastropod mollusk in the family Calyptraeidae, the slipper snails or slipper limpets, cup-and-saucer snails, and Chinese hat snails.
