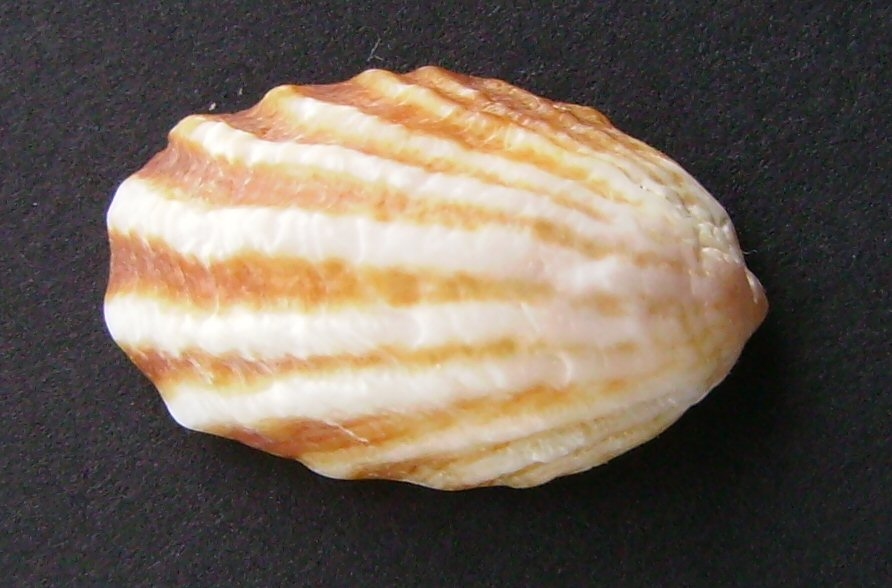

Scientific classification
- Kingdom: Animalia
- Phylum: Mollusca
- Class: Gastropoda
- Subclass: Caenogastropoda
- Order: Littorinimorpha
- Family: Calyptraeidae
- Genus: Maoricrypta
- Species: M. costata

Binomial name
- Maoricrypta costata (Sowerby I, 1824)

Synonyms
- Crepidula costata Deshayes, 1830 (unaccepted- homonym and synonym of C. costata G.B. Sowerby I, 1824); Crepidula costata Sowerby I, 1824; Crepidula lineolata Deshayes, 1830 (possible synonym)

= Maoricrypta costata =

Species of gastropod

Maoricrypta costata, or the Ribbed Slipper Shell, is a species of intertidal medium-sized sea snail, a marine gastropod mollusc in the family Calyptraeidae.

== Distribution ==
This species occurs along the East Coast of the North Island, New Zealand: Cape Reinga to Whakatāne.

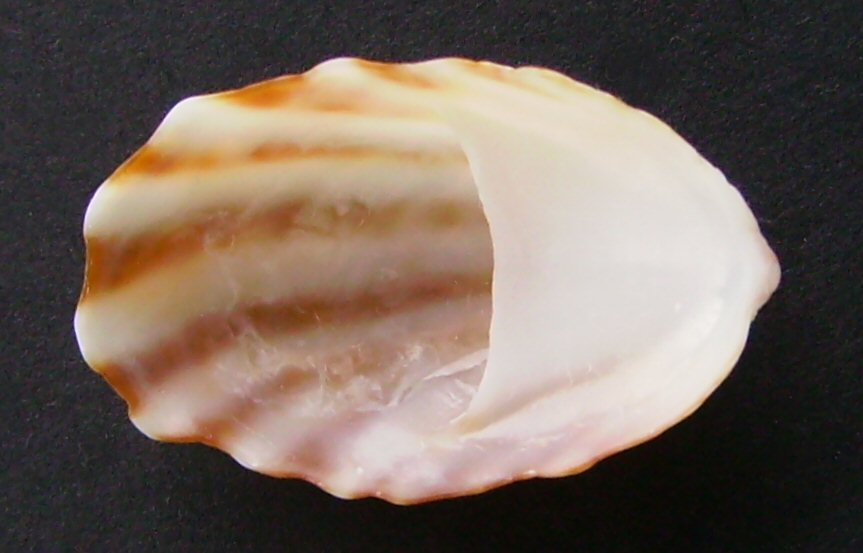
Maoricrypta costata, ventral view showing "shelf" or "deck".
