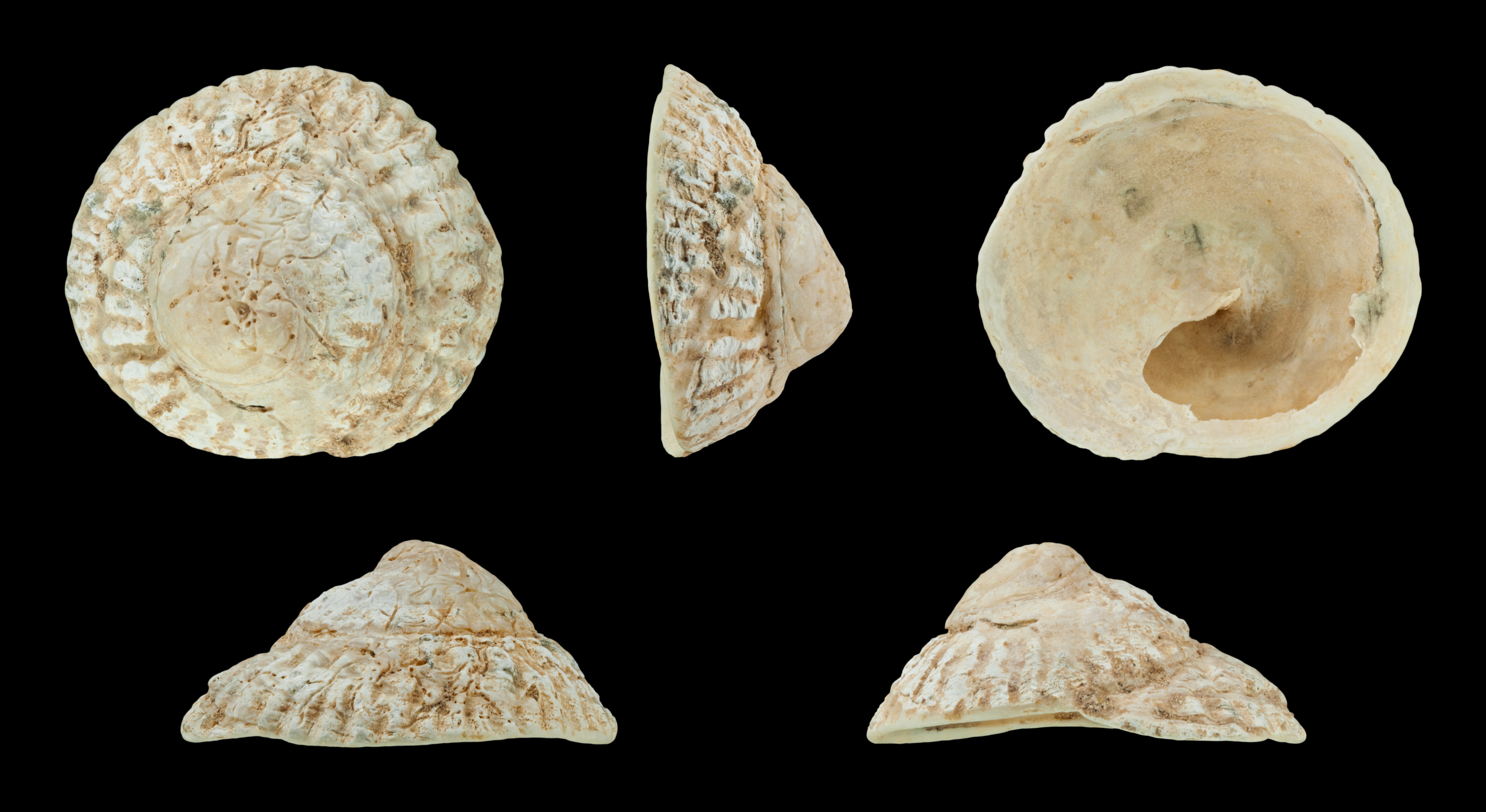

Scientific classification
- Kingdom: Animalia
- Phylum: Mollusca
- Class: Gastropoda
- Subclass: Caenogastropoda
- Order: Littorinimorpha
- Family: Calyptraeidae
- Genus: Trochita
- Species: T. trochiformis

Binomial name
- Trochita trochiformis (Born, 1778)

Synonyms
- Trochita calyptraeaformis auct.

= Trochita trochiformis =

Species of gastropod

Trochita trochiformis is a species of sea snail, a marine gastropod mollusk in the family Calyptraeidae, the slipper snails or slipper limpets, cup-and-saucer snails, and Chinese hat snails.
