= Crepidula ustulatulina =

Scientific classification
- Kingdom: Animalia
- Phylum: Mollusca
- Class: Gastropoda
- Subclass: Caenogastropoda
- Order: Littorinimorpha
- Family: Calyptraeidae
- Genus: Crepidula
- Species: C. ustulatulina

Binomial name
- Crepidula ustulatulina Collin, 2002

Synonyms
- Little Speckled Slipper Snail

Species of gastropod

Crepidula ustulatulina is a species of small sea snail, a slipper snail, a marine gastropod mollusk in the family Calyptraeidae, the slipper snails or slipper limpets, cup-and-saucer snails, and Chinese hat snails.

This species occurs in the Western Atlantic Ocean.

== Distribution ==
This recently named species is known to occur in the Gulf of Mexico and the east coast of Florida.

== Description ==
Crepidula ustulatulina can be distinguished from other species of Crepidula by the following suite of characters. The shell is small (usually less than 1.5 cm), smooth, and convex. It is often cream with distinct chestnut brown spots or streaks, sometimes it is brown overall with darker spots or streaks. The internal septum is flat and white, and the animal's left side usually extends somewhat farther forward than does the right side. The margin is straight or slightly bowed. There is an oval muscle scar just anterior to the shelf on the animal's right side. The small apex is usually directly posterior and is slightly rostrate in animals living on small snails but not in those from flat substrates. The external body color is light to dark gray with opaque white or cream on the tips of the tentacles and the lips. There are usually large yellow pigment splotches on the mantle, neck and sometimes foot, visible only in life.

The maximum recorded shell length is 13.2 mm. The shell is usually cream with brown mottling. The visible soft parts are mostly grey.

== Habitat ==
Crepidula ustulatulina is common in the low intertidal and shallow subtidal, often on dead clam shells and on columbellids and cerithids in or near sea grass. Those living on large flat substrates are oval in shape but those on small snails have highly arched and often compressed on the left side. Minimum recorded depth is 0 m. Maximum recorded depth is 1 m.

== Development ==
The large eggs (300-340 μm) produce direct developing embryos with a smooth shell, and an average length of 744 μm at hatching. The large embryonic velum is not absorbed prior to hatching and the embryo hatches as a swimming pediveliger. The non-feeding larvae settle within an hour of hatching. There are between 3 and 16 eggs in each capsule and the number of eggs per capsule increases with female size.
