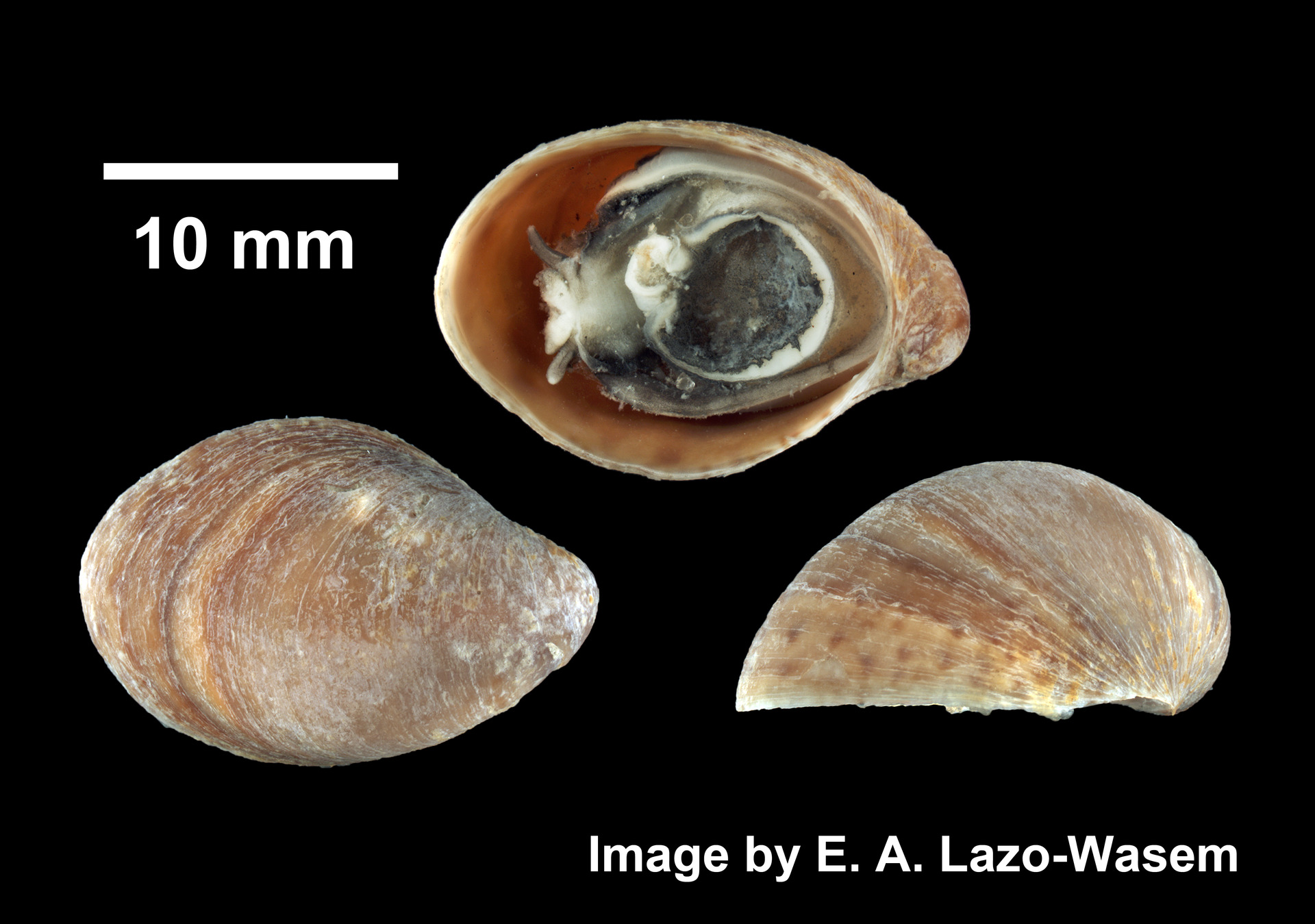

Scientific classification
- Kingdom: Animalia
- Phylum: Mollusca
- Class: Gastropoda
- Subclass: Caenogastropoda
- Order: Littorinimorpha
- Family: Calyptraeidae
- Genus: Crepidula
- Species: C. convexa

Binomial name
- Crepidula convexa Say, 1822

= Crepidula convexa =

Species of mollusc

Crepidula convexa is a species of sea snail, a marine gastropod mollusk in the family Calyptraeidae, the slipper snails or slipper limpets, cup-and-saucer snails, and Chinese hat snails. The maximum recorded shell length is 20 mm.

== Distribution ==
This species is native to the eastern coasts of North and Central America, from Canada to Panama.

== Habitat ==
The minimum recorded depth at which this species has been found is 0 m (i.e. at the sea surface); the maximum recorded depth is 70 m.

== Location ==
Crepidula convexa can be found along the east coast of North America. Geographically they can be found in the low intertidal zone (5 to 10 meters) and to roughly about 200 meters down into the shallow subtidal zone. They are predominantly found on rocks, shells and sea grass.

== Description ==
The shell of the Crepidula convexa can be described as oval-shaped. This is mostly due to the shell needing to meet the needs of its environment. They vary depending on their exact location being in sea grass or in rocks. Those located in sea grass are oftentimes smaller and have a steeper arch then their counterparts located in rocky areas. The snail varies in shades of cocoa, often having spots or streaks on the shell. Rarely do some have purple tints near the apex. The shelf is flat or slightly convex and the left side extends farther forward than it does the right side. The typical maximum Crepidula convexa will grow up to 20 mm in length.

== Development ==
Crepidula convexa follows a sequential hermaphroditism life cycle. During its life it will pass through five sexual phases. The immature phase is where it is in the larval stage and has no need to start sexual reproduction but shows a slight rise on the right side of the neck where the phallus will later grow. Next, when hatched the snail will be in what is called the "phallus bud" stage, which is the forming of the male sexual organ and may have a peg-like phallus. Soon after, it will have developed a full phallus and be deemed a male, where it can start the sexual reproduction process and fertilize its female counterparts. Later on it will start to change and grow into a "transitional" where the male starts to grow and loses the ability to fertilize and start to become female. Finally, it will be a female which will be its final sexual phase. At that point it will be able to be inseminated and lay eggs and may have a remnant of a degenerate phallus.

== Reproduction ==
During a single breeding season the larger female will only have one male partner. On the other hand males may mate with multiple females. This increases the survivability rate of the species because there is always an abundance of females than males. The smaller males have greater mobility which allows them to mate more and increase reproductive capacity for the species in a given area.

== Population structure ==
The genetic structure of Crepidula convexa differs distinctively based on the location of the species. The genetics of a specific snail of this species from Florida can be separated from another found in New England. Samples of Crepidula convexa in the south may have faster growth rates and thus shorter life spans due to higher pH levels, but it is still an arguable science as to why they have faster growth rate than their counterparts in other regions. These snails are not equipped to travel long distances to migrate. They live on the shells of other organisms, some being sea grass. This can be attributed to short distance gene flow. They may "piggyback" a ride on horseshoe crabs to warmer regions they are not necessarily native to.
