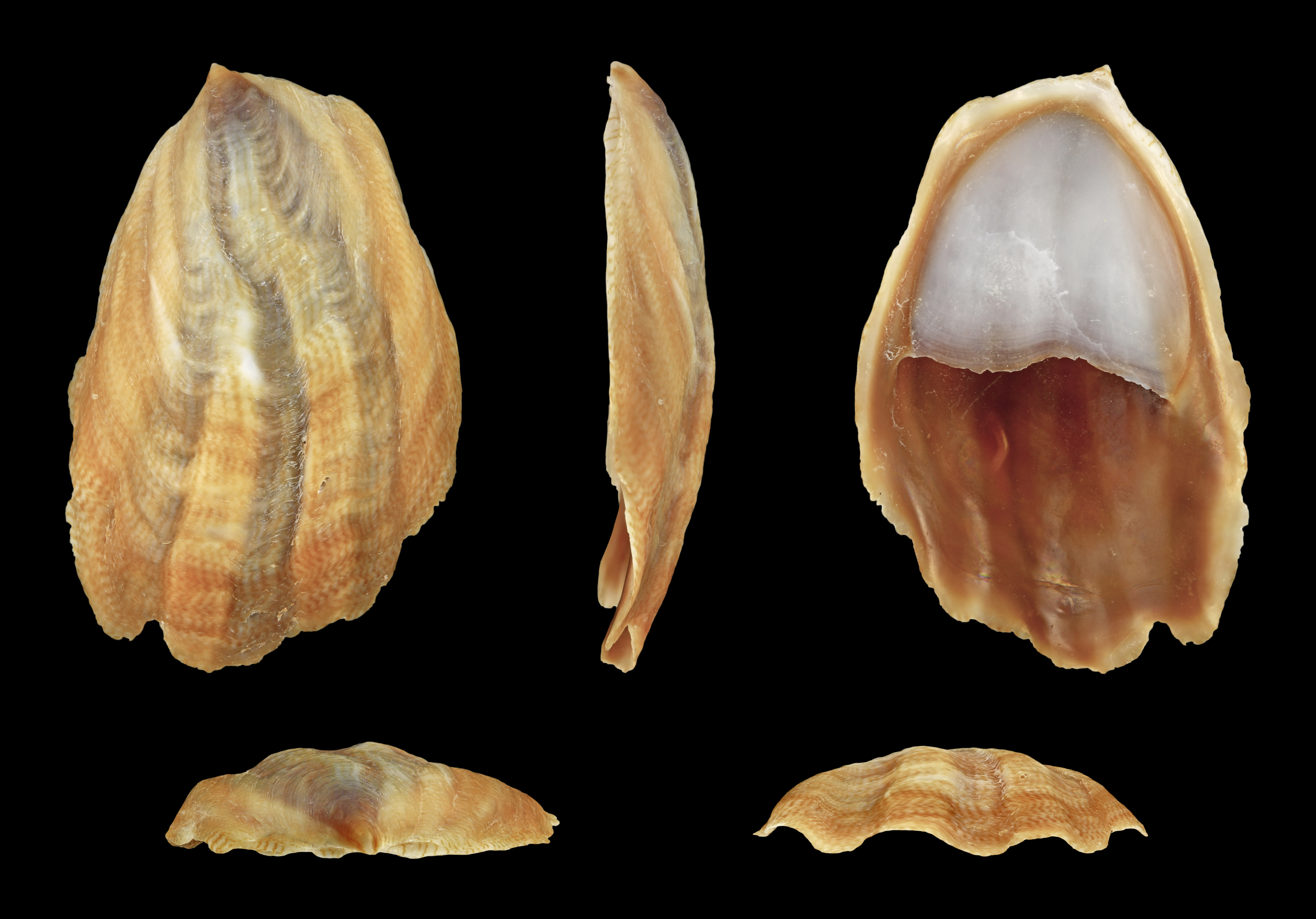

Scientific classification
- Domain: Eukaryota
- Kingdom: Animalia
- Phylum: Mollusca
- Class: Gastropoda
- Subclass: Caenogastropoda
- Order: Littorinimorpha
- Family: Calyptraeidae
- Genus: Crepidula
- Species: C. onyx

Binomial name
- Crepidula onyx G. B. Sowerby I, 1824

= Crepidula onyx =

Species of gastropod

Crepidula onyx, the onyx slippersnail or onyx slipper snail, is a species of sea snail with gills, a marine gastropod mollusc in the family Calyptraeidae, the slipper snails and cup-and-saucer snails.

== Shell description ==
The shell of Crepidula onyx is up to 70 mm in length. The interior of the shell is glossy and is a strong tan to dark brown color, similar to the common colors of the mineral onyx. The "shelf" or "deck" is white.

The shell of this species can be distinguished from the shell of Crepidula adunca by:

- Its larger size,
- The apex is low and near the margin of the shell, curved to one side and not markedly hooked (rather than high, hooked and centrally placed),
- The interior shelf is notched at the ends, rather than curved forward at both ends, and
- The periostracum is more prominent.

== Distribution ==
The native range for this species is the Eastern Pacific Ocean coast of the Americas, from Southern California to Chile.

=== Nonindigenous distribution ===
The species has been introduced and is considered to be established in Puget Sound, Washington, since 2005.

== Ecology ==
=== Habitat ===
This species is common on rocks, shells, and pilings in protected bays, but it also lives in sheltered places on the open coast, occurring from the low intertidal zone to subtidal waters.
