= Crepidula margarita =

Scientific classification
- Kingdom: Animalia
- Phylum: Mollusca
- Class: Gastropoda
- Subclass: Caenogastropoda
- Order: Littorinimorpha
- Family: Calyptraeidae
- Genus: Crepidula
- Species: C. margarita

Binomial name
- Crepidula margarita Simone, 2006

Species of gastropod

Crepidula margarita is a species of sea snail, a marine gastropod mollusc in the family Calyptraeidae, the slipper snails or slipper limpets, cup-and-saucer snails, and Chinese hat snails.

== Description ==
The maximum recorded shell length is 18.2 mm.

== Habitat ==
Minimum recorded depth is 0.5 m. Maximum recorded depth is 1 m.
