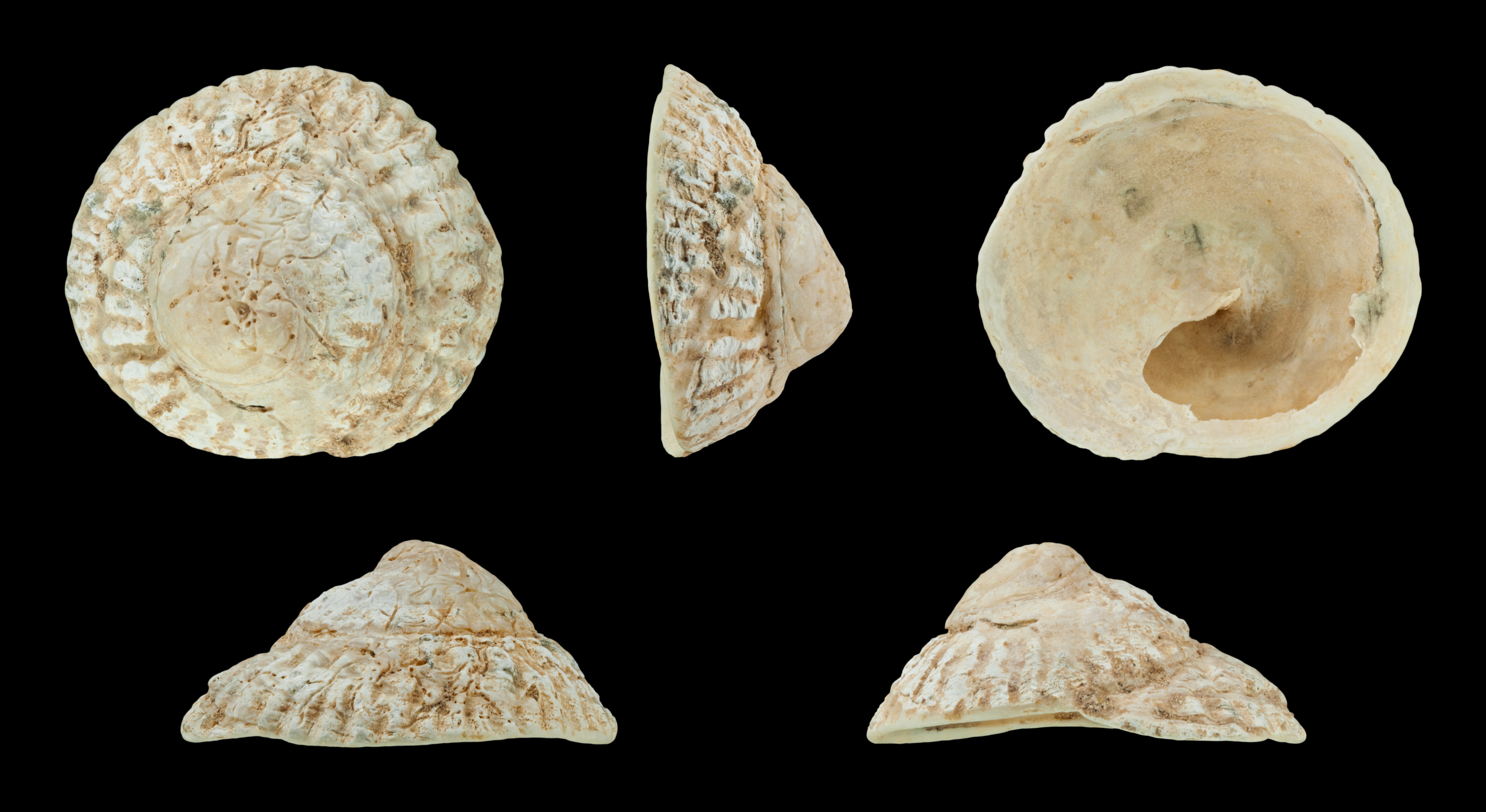
- Trochita trochiformis

Scientific classification
- Kingdom: Animalia
- Phylum: Mollusca
- Class: Gastropoda
- Subclass: Caenogastropoda
- Order: Littorinimorpha
- Family: Calyptraeidae
- Genus: Trochita; Schumacher, 1817

Type species
- Trochita spiralis Schumacher, 1817

Synonyms
- Trochatella Lesson, 1831; Trochilla Swainson, 1835

= Trochita =

Genus of gastropods

Trochita is a genus of sea snails, marine gastropod mollusks in the family Calyptraeidae, the slipper snails or slipper limpets, cup-and-saucer snails, and Chinese hat snails.

== Species ==
Species within the genus Trochita include:

- Trochita dhofarensis Taylor & Smythe, 1985
- Trochita pileolus (d'Orbigny, 1841)
- Trochita pileus (Lamarck, 1822)
- Trochita trochiformis (Born, 1778)

Species brought into synonymy

- Trochita alta Hutton, 1885: synonym of Sigapatella terraenovae Peile, 1924
- Trochita calyptraeaformis : synonym of Trochita trochiformis (Born, 1778)
- Trochita clypeolum Reeve, 1859: synonym of Trochita pileus (Lamarck, 1822)
- Trochita corrugata Reeve, 1859: synonym of Trochita pileus (Lamarck, 1822)
- Trochita decipiens (Philippi, 1845): synonym of Trochita pileolus (d'Orbigny, 1841)
- Trochita georgiana A. W. B. Powell, 1951: synonym of Trochita pileolus (d'Orbigny, 1841)
- Trochita helicoidea (Sowerby, 1883): synonym of Calyptraea helicoidea (G.B. Sowerby II, 1883)
- Trochita radians (Lamarck, 1816): synonym of Trochita trochiformis (Born, 1778)
- Trochita spiralis Schumacher, 1817: synonym of Trochita trochiformis (Born, 1778)
- Trochita spirata (Forbes, 1852): synonym of Trochita trochiformis (Born, 1778)
- Trochita tenuis (Gray, 1867): synonym of Sigapatella tenuis (Gray, 1867)
- Trochita ventricosa Carpenter, 1857 : taxon inquirendum
