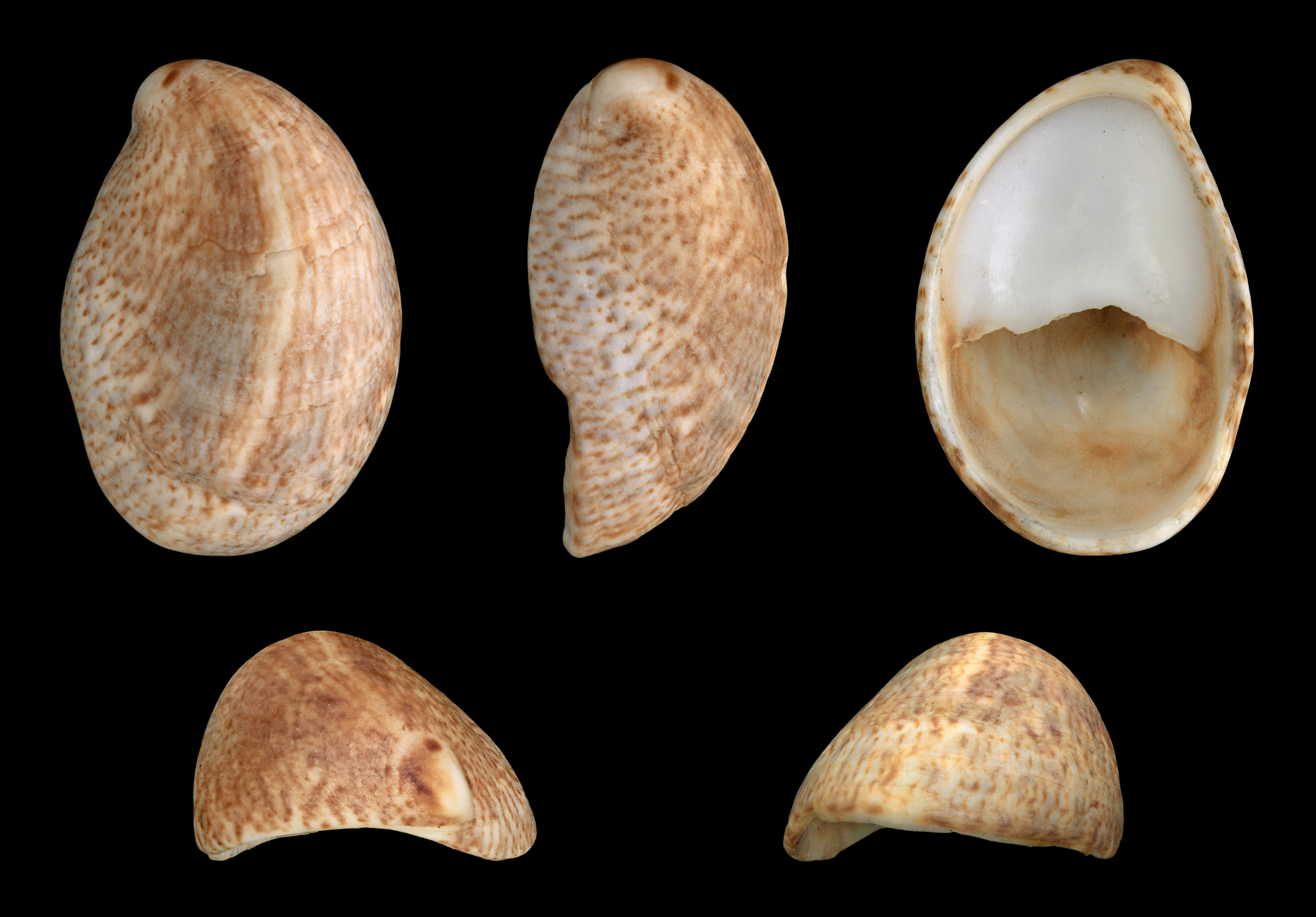
- Five views of a shell of Crepidula fornicata

Scientific classification
- Kingdom: Animalia
- Phylum: Mollusca
- Class: Gastropoda
- Subclass: Caenogastropoda
- Order: Littorinimorpha
- Family: Calyptraeidae
- Genus: Crepidula
- Species: C. fornicata

Binomial name
- Crepidula fornicata (Linnaeus, 1758)

= Crepidula fornicata =

Species of gastropod

Crepidula fornicata is a species of medium-sized sea snail, a marine gastropod mollusc in the family Calyptraeidae, the slipper snails and cup and saucer snails. It has many common names, including common slipper shell, common Atlantic slippersnail, boat shell, quarterdeck shell, fornicating slipper snail, Atlantic slipper limpet and it is in Britain as the "common slipper limpet".

== Description ==
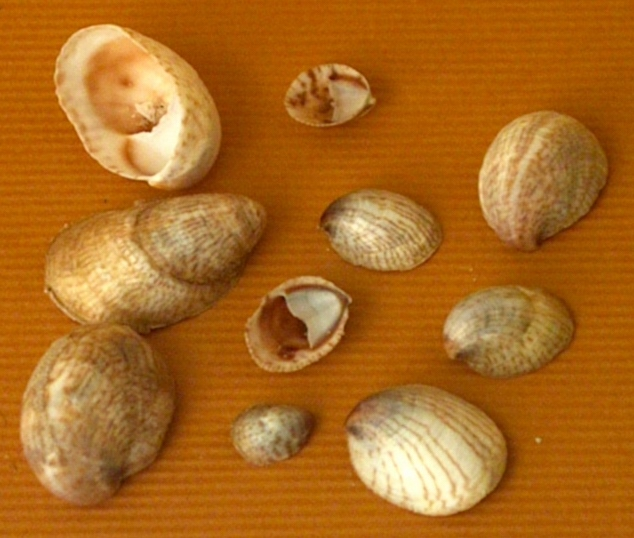
10 fresh shells of Crepidula fornicata

The size of the shell is 20–50 mm. The maximum recorded shell length is 56 mm.

This sea snail has an arched, rounded shell. On the inside of the shell there is a white "deck", which causes the shell to resemble a boat or a slipper, hence the common names. There is variability in the shape of the shell: some shells are more arched than others.

Groups of individuals are often found heaped up and fastened together, with the larger, older females below and the smaller, younger males on top. As a heap grows, the males turn into females (making them sequential hermaphrodites).

== Distribution ==
The species is native to the western Atlantic Ocean, specifically the Eastern coast of North America. Its distribution ranges from 48°N to 25°N; 97.2°W to 25°W from as far north as Nova Scotia to as far south as the Gulf of Mexico. It has been introduced accidentally to other parts of the world and has become problematic.

=== Nonindigenous distribution ===
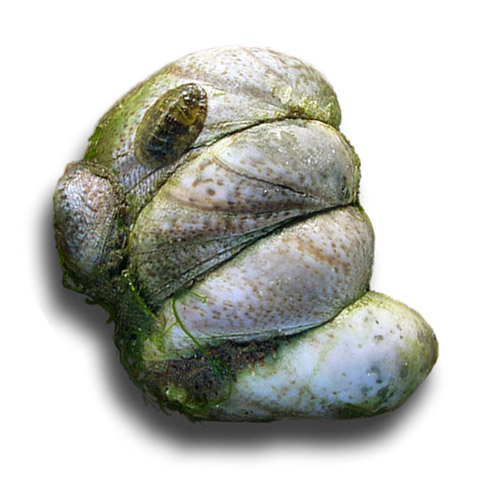
A stack of Crepidula fornicata. The small one on the left is a male, the oval animal at the top left is a chiton.

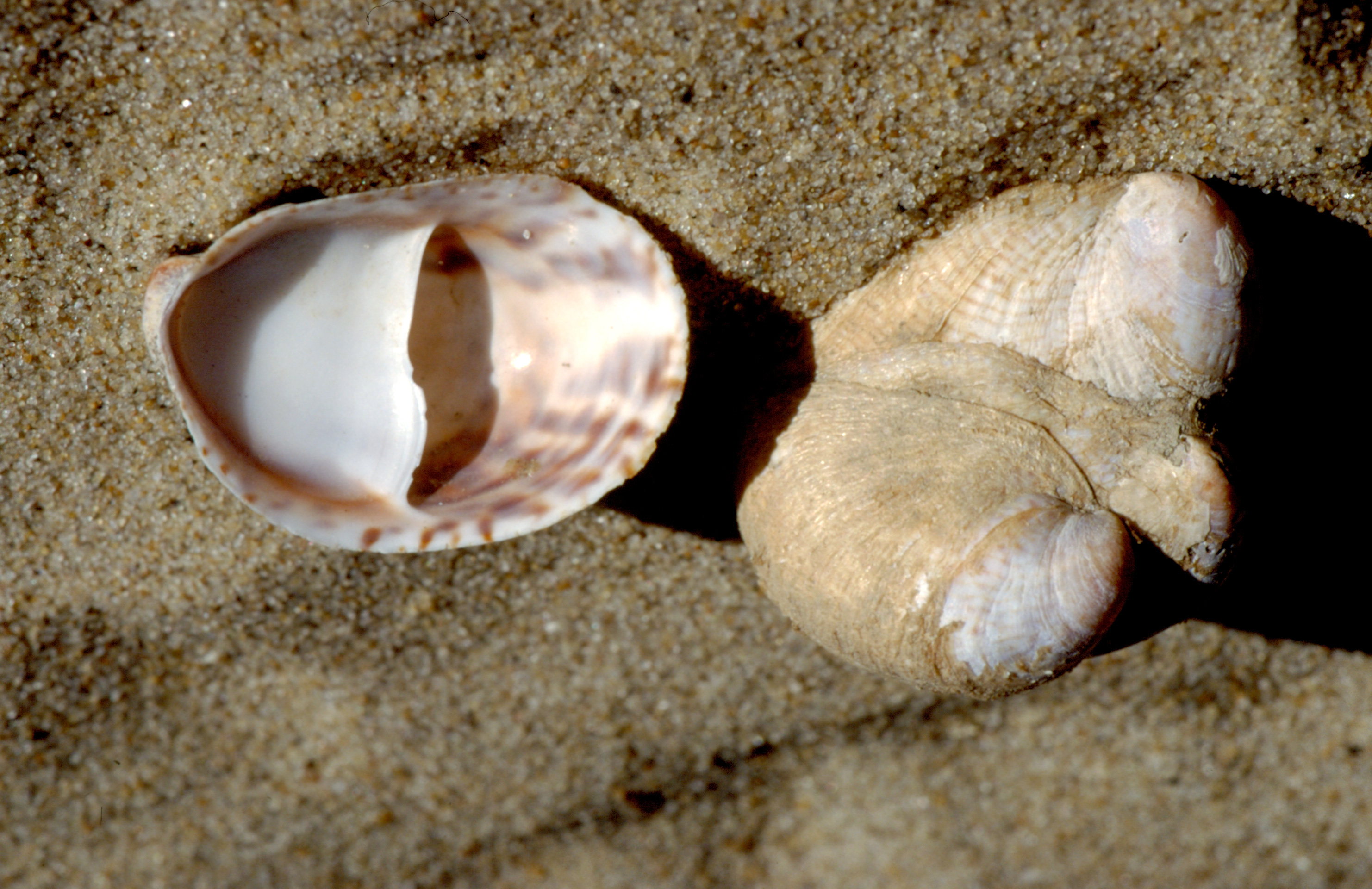

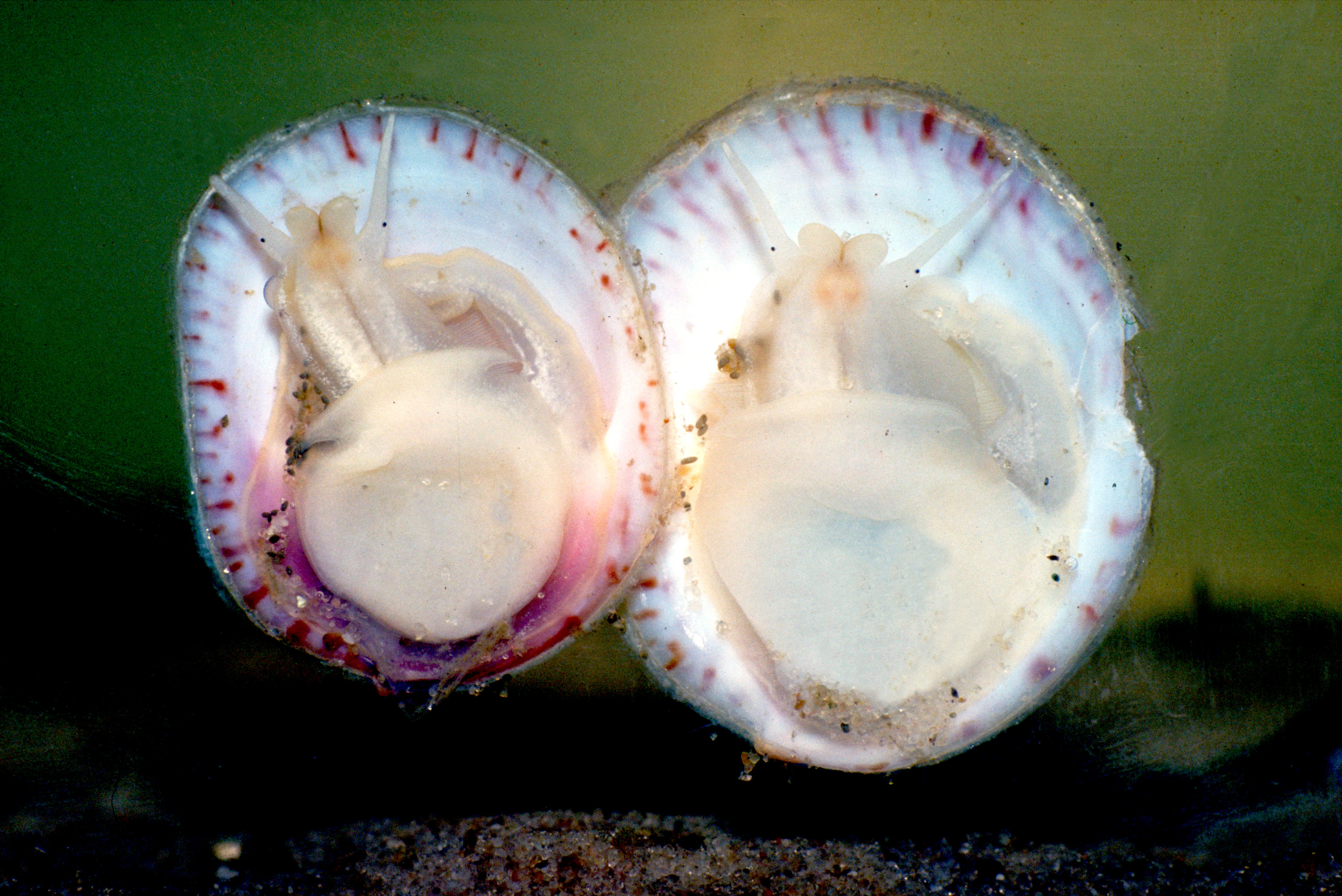

It was introduced to the state of Washington. The species was, however, brought to Europe together with the eastern oyster Crassostrea virginica. In Belgium, the first slipper limpet was found on September 28, 1911, attached to an oyster in Ostend, and since the 1930s it is seen as a common species along the Belgian coast.

The species is considered an invasive species in Denmark, France, Italy, the Netherlands, Spain, and the United Kingdom. It has also spread to Norway and Sweden. It is known to damage oyster fisheries. The slipper limpet has few to no predators in Europe, and can thrive on several types of hard bottoms and shellfish banks. A continued expansion to the north is probably inhibited by temperature: low temperatures during the winter can slow down or inhibit the development of the slipper limpet. It has also been introduced to the Pacific Northwest and Japan.

== Human consumption ==
=== Culinary use ===
Many different avenues can be ventured upon to find the perfect target market and the best way to market these shellfish. Slipper limpets are a versatile food. They have the flavor and individualism to stand alone as a main course, an appetizer or be incorporated into many different dishes. Before, during and after cooking, slipper limpets produce a good amount of liquid which can be boiled down into broth or stock. The liquid itself could also be used as a clam juice substitute...Recipes including limpets have been published in Scottish cookbooks; in Hawaii they are considered a delicacy and the Azores highly value them in their cultural dishes.

Although considered an invasive species, there are attempts to harvest and market the snail in France.

== Ecology ==
=== Habitat ===
Although Crepidula fornicata is a species with cosmopolitan distribution, and can tolerate a wide range of environmental conditions, populations are particularly well developed in wave protected areas such as bays, estuaries or sheltered sides of wave exposed islands. Their distribution within the water column has been shown to a minimum of 0m and a maximum of 70m. They are often found living stacked on top of one another on rocks, on horseshoe crabs, shells and on dock pilings.

=== Feeding habits ===
Generally for Calyptraeidae, feeding habits include planktonic and minute detrital food items through either suspension or deposit feeding.

=== Life cycle & reproduction ===
The species is a sequential hermaphrodite. The slipper limpet normally lives in stacks of up to 12 individuals, with the largest at the bottom and with increasingly smaller individuals stacked on top of one another. The largest and oldest animals, at the base of a pile are female, the younger and smaller animals at the top are male. If the females in the stack die, the largest of the males will become a female. Breeding can occur between February and October with peak activity occurring in May and June. Roughly 80-90% of females spawn during May and June. Most slipper limpet females will spawn twice in a year, generally after neap tides.

=== As an invasive non-native species ===
Within the United Kingdom, the common slipper limpet is considered to be an invasive non-native species (INNS). The release of slipper limpets to the sea is an offence within England. This species has been recorded around the coasts of Southern England and Wales as far north as Anglesey on the west coast and Spurn Point on the east coast. The slipper limpet has been recorded within the Thames Estuary amongst other brackish environments. First recorded in 1872, these non-native limpets arrived in England and Wales from America in a shipment of oysters. Their impacts to U.K ecosystems are still being investigated, however, there is growing evidence that this species is detrimental to native molluscs beds such as Queen scallop Aequipecten opercularis, edible oyster Ostrea edulis, and blue mussel Mytilus edulis. Common slipper limpets are currently being considered as a food source in efforts to reduce their spread from Southern England.
