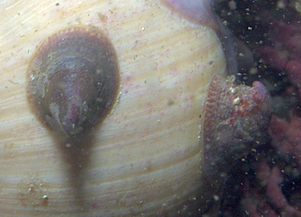
- Dorsal view of one Crepidula adunca (left) and lateral view of another Crepidula adunca (right), living on the shell of a Polinices

Scientific classification
- Kingdom: Animalia
- Phylum: Mollusca
- Class: Gastropoda
- Subclass: Caenogastropoda
- Order: Littorinimorpha
- Family: Calyptraeidae
- Genus: Crepidula
- Species: C. adunca

Binomial name
- Crepidula adunca Sowerby I, 1825

= Crepidula adunca =

Species of gastropod

Crepidula adunca, common name the "hooked slippersnail" is a species of sea snail or "slipper snail", a marine gastropod mollusk in the family Calyptraeidae, the slipper snails and cup-and-saucer snails.

== Distribution ==
This species occurs in the Eastern Pacific Ocean, from Canada to Baja California, Mexico. Crepidula is usually found in semi-permanent stacks of 2 Crepidula adunca individuals (usually more females than males). They do not reproduce well in the mid-intertidal zone, (20–30 meters). They live in epizootic associations, where the adults are inactive and the C. adunca’s shell grows to fit the shape of its host's shell. Mobile juveniles must choose long-term hosts, other animals, that minimize their chances of death. However, they cannot voluntarily remove themselves from their host once they reach a certain size. They prefer warm weather, and climate change has caused increase in population of C. adunca.

== Characteristics ==
The Crepidula adunca is a mollusk that relies on suspension feeding (filters food out of the water) and are hermaphrodites that brood their young. They live in long-term epizootic associations. Females are usually larger than males. C. adunca have dense patches of cilia around the mouth, near the head, located on the side between the tentacles, and on the foot, which develops before anything else. There can be a size overlap between males and females of stacking species (and non-stacking). A stacking species is when the organisms attach to one another creating a stack of them. The young are kept in capsules in the mantle cavity (where other organs are kept) of the parent. The mollusks leave the parent when they are adult size and have all organs except for the reproductive organs. When they are young, they experience a male phase, and later in life change into a female phase, a process known as sequential hermaphroditism. It was disproved, with C. adunca, that males in solitary and males surrounded by females sex change at different time, instead there is little difference.

== Reproduction ==
The longer the female the greater average of gamete abundance. Females typically reproduce the same amount of eggs in a capsule no matter where they are in development. C. adunca embryos are born as crawling juveniles. Development for embryos happens in capsules. C. adunca reproduce in eggs, where multiple eggs are contained in capsules. Growth and development in the capsules happens at the same time at the same speed.

Before all the features, the eyes are developed and seen first, then kidney cells are formed near the side of the ciliated mouth. C. adunca juveniles are able to filter feed right after birth. The C. adunca hatchling develops multiple embryonic kidneys, where other Crepidula only develop one, meaning it is a direct developer and also cannot develop the operculum. For Crepidula species, the phallus of the organism usually becomes reaches full size when there is enough sperm to fill the spermatic vesicles, then it begins to outgrow its juvenile shell. However C. adunca is an exception, where the phallus immediately begins growth at the time of hatching. C. adunca broods to reproduce, all year. It does not differ between stacking and non stacking females. C. adunca are oviparous, meaning they develop in eggs. In the beginning of mitosis (the first two cell divisions) a polar lobe forms, which takes roughly 42 hours. Once the cells are clear and the head and foot of the mollusc are not fully developed, a shell begins to grow over the embryo. The shell develops color pigments before it fully grown. C. adunca hatch when all the yolk has been absorbed. Development of the C. adunca in the eggs takes around four months. When hatched, the gills and radula are fully grown, and no longer need to develop; the only signs of larvae growth are the embryonic kidneys and head vesicle grown in the eggs. The shell is not yet fully developed into an adult size, but is bilaterally proportional to the new hatchling.

== Nervous system ==
The Crepidula adunca nervous system begins at the neck. There are two main nerves in the head, that give rise to other nerves. The pedal ganglia (supplies nerves to the foot of the snail) gives rise to four other nerves leading to the foot and back to the neck. The visceral loop is made up of three different types of ganglia - the sub-intestinal, the supra-intestinal and the visceral. The visceral loop has a nerve in the mantle of the C. adunca, which goes to the back of the head when it is contracted. After the foot begins growth, a tentacle begins to form. Finally, when the yolk in egg is absorbed, the embryo flattens and the nervous system finalizes, meaning the C. adunca is ready to hatch.

== Nutrition ==
Because C. adunca filter feeds, it uses cilia to bring the small organisms over its gills where it filters out the bacteria from the water using mucus made by the gill cells. Once caught by the mucus, the cilia, known as ciliary action, carries the organisms to the mouth along the dorsal surface. The organisms that C. adunca filters for are diatoms, dinoflagellates, phytoplankton, bacteria, etc.
