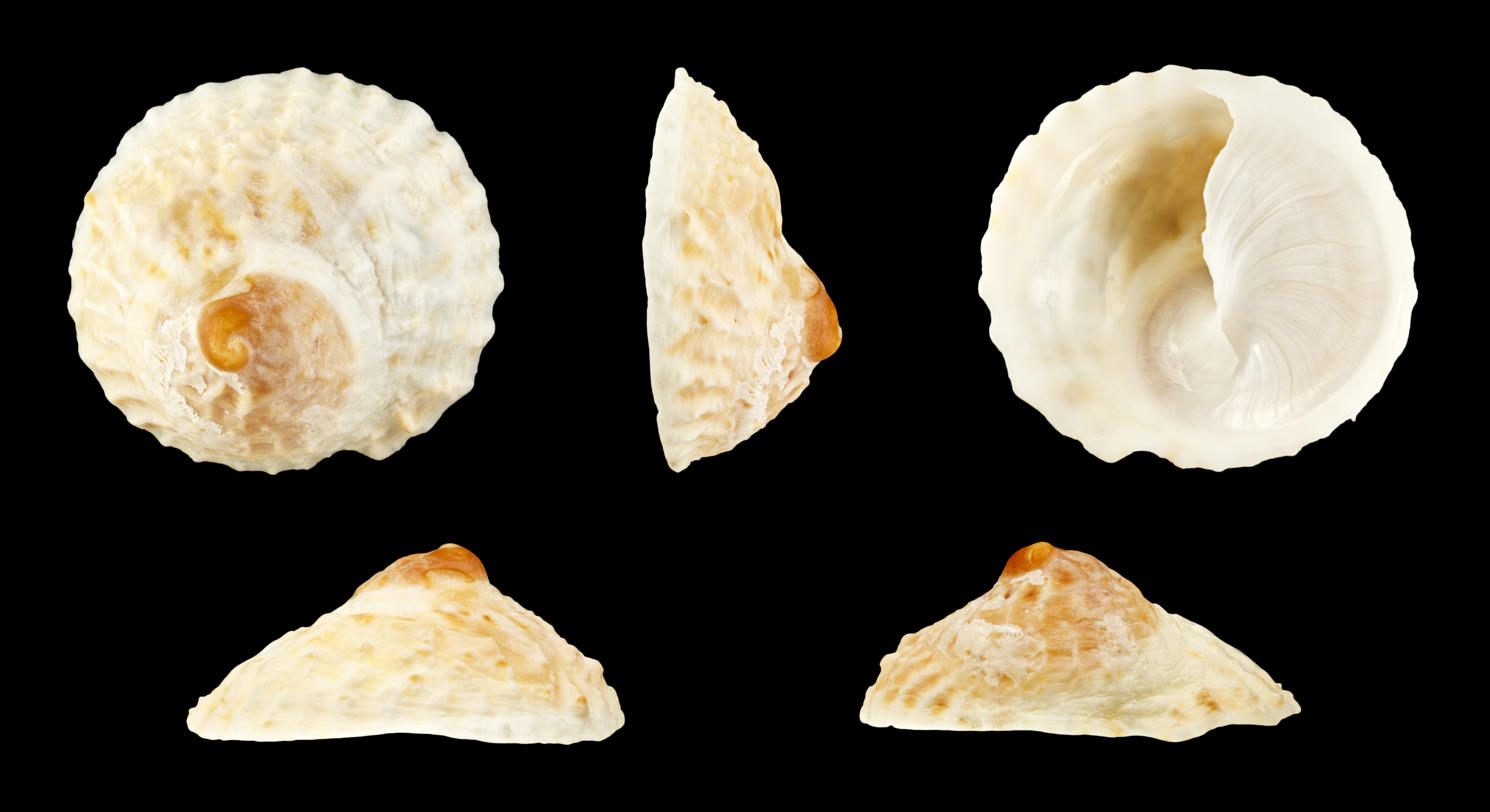

Scientific classification
- Kingdom: Animalia
- Phylum: Mollusca
- Class: Gastropoda
- Subclass: Caenogastropoda
- Order: Littorinimorpha
- Family: Calyptraeidae
- Genus: Calyptraea
- Species: C. helicoidea

Binomial name
- Calyptraea helicoidea (G.B. Sowerby II, 1883)

Synonyms
- Trochita helicoidea G.B. Sowerby II, 1883 (original combination)

= Calyptraea helicoidea =

Species of gastropod

Calyptraea helicoidea is a species of sea snail, a marine gastropod mollusk in the family Calyptraeidae, the slipper snails or slipper limpets, cup-and-saucer snails, and Chinese hat snails.

== Distribution ==
This marine species occurs off Port Elisabeth and East London, South Africa.
