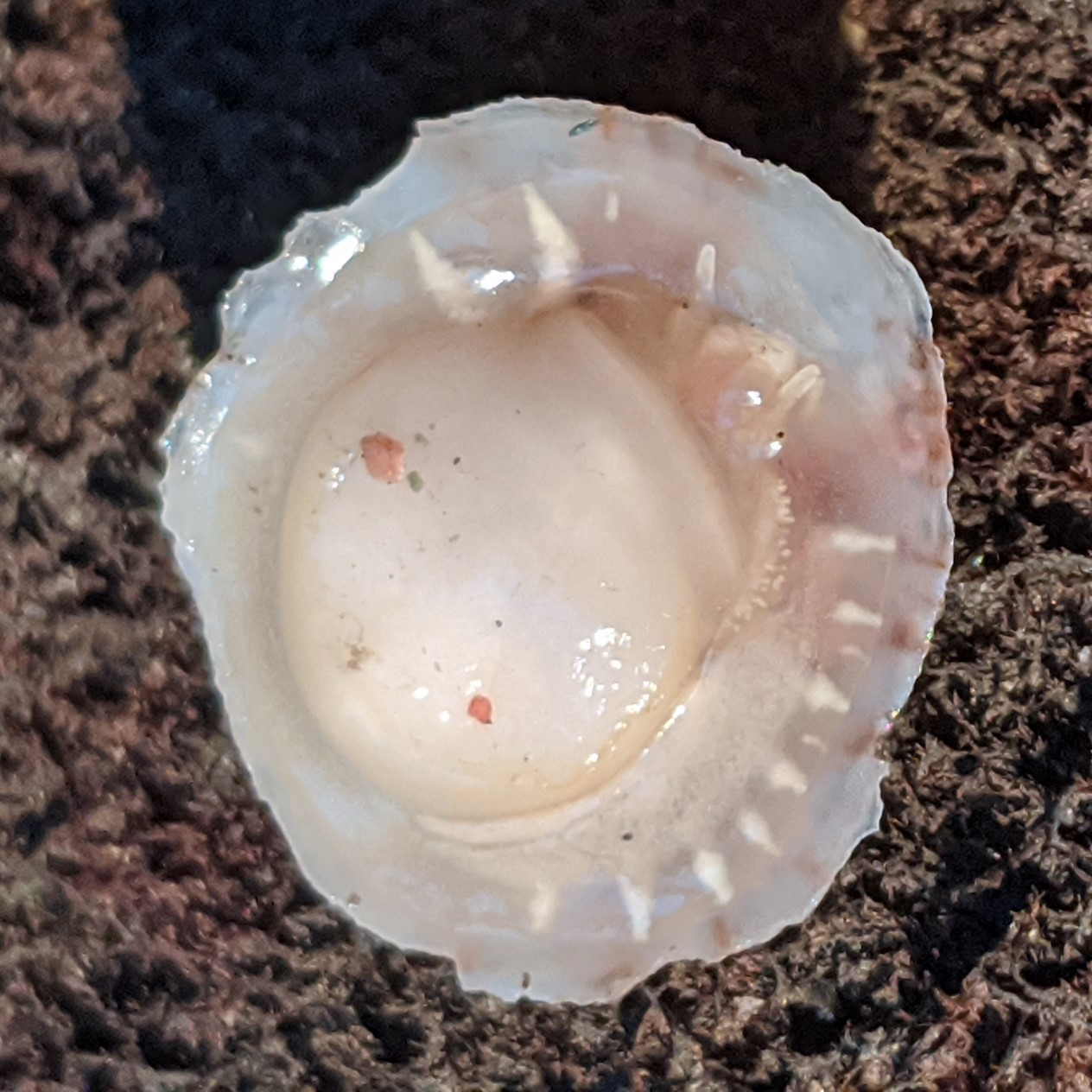

Scientific classification
- Kingdom: Animalia
- Phylum: Mollusca
- Class: Gastropoda
- Subclass: Caenogastropoda
- Order: Littorinimorpha
- Family: Calyptraeidae
- Genus: Crepipatella
- Species: C. lingulata

Binomial name
- Crepipatella lingulata (Gould, 1846)

Synonyms
- Crepidula lingulata (Gould, 1846)

= Crepipatella lingulata =

Species of gastropod

Crepipatella lingulata is a species of sea snail, a marine gastropod mollusk in the family Calyptraeidae.
