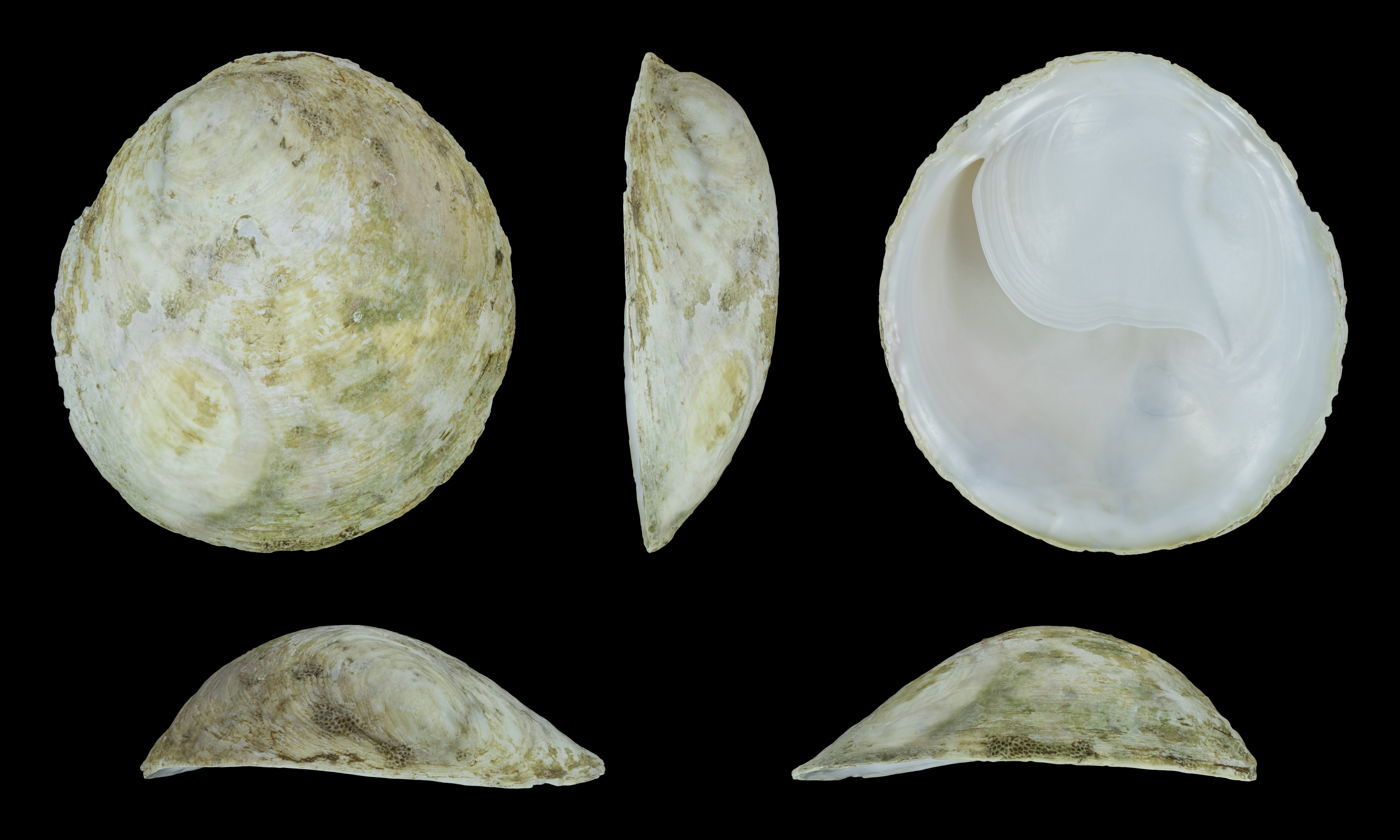
- Shell of Crepipatella dilatata

Scientific classification
- Kingdom: Animalia
- Phylum: Mollusca
- Class: Gastropoda
- Subclass: Caenogastropoda
- Order: Littorinimorpha
- Family: Calyptraeidae
- Genus: Crepipatella
- Species: C. dilatata

Binomial name
- Crepipatella dilatata (Lamarck, 1822)

Synonyms
- Crepidula depressa Deshayes, 1830; Crepidula dilatata (Lamarck, 1822); Crepidula nautiloides Lesson, 1832; Crepidula uncinata Philippi, 1887; Crypta subdilatata Mabille & Rochebrune, 1889

= Crepipatella dilatata =

Species of gastropod

Crepipatella dilatata is a species of sea snail described by Lamarck. It is a marine gastropod mollusk in the family Calyptraeidae, the slipper snails or slipper limpets, cup-and-saucer snails, and hat snails.

This species can be distinguished from the other species of South American Crepipatella by examination of developing embryos. The females brood capsules that include both un-cleaving nurse eggs and viable embryos. The embryos consume the nurse eggs and develop into juveniles that crawl away from the capsule at hatching.

== Distribution ==
Crepipatella dilatata has been documented to occur along the coast of Chile and the southern coast of Argentina. Since this species is morphologically cryptic with the two other South American species of Crepipatella, DNA sequence data or developmental data are necessary to verify the identity of this species and to obtain accurate distribution data.

Crepipatella dilatata has been also been documented along the Northern coast of Spain.

== Description ==
The maximum recorded shell length is 60 mm.

== Habitat ==
Minimum recorded depth is 0 m. Maximum recorded depth is 66 m. This species commonly occurs living of mussels as well as on rocky substrate.
