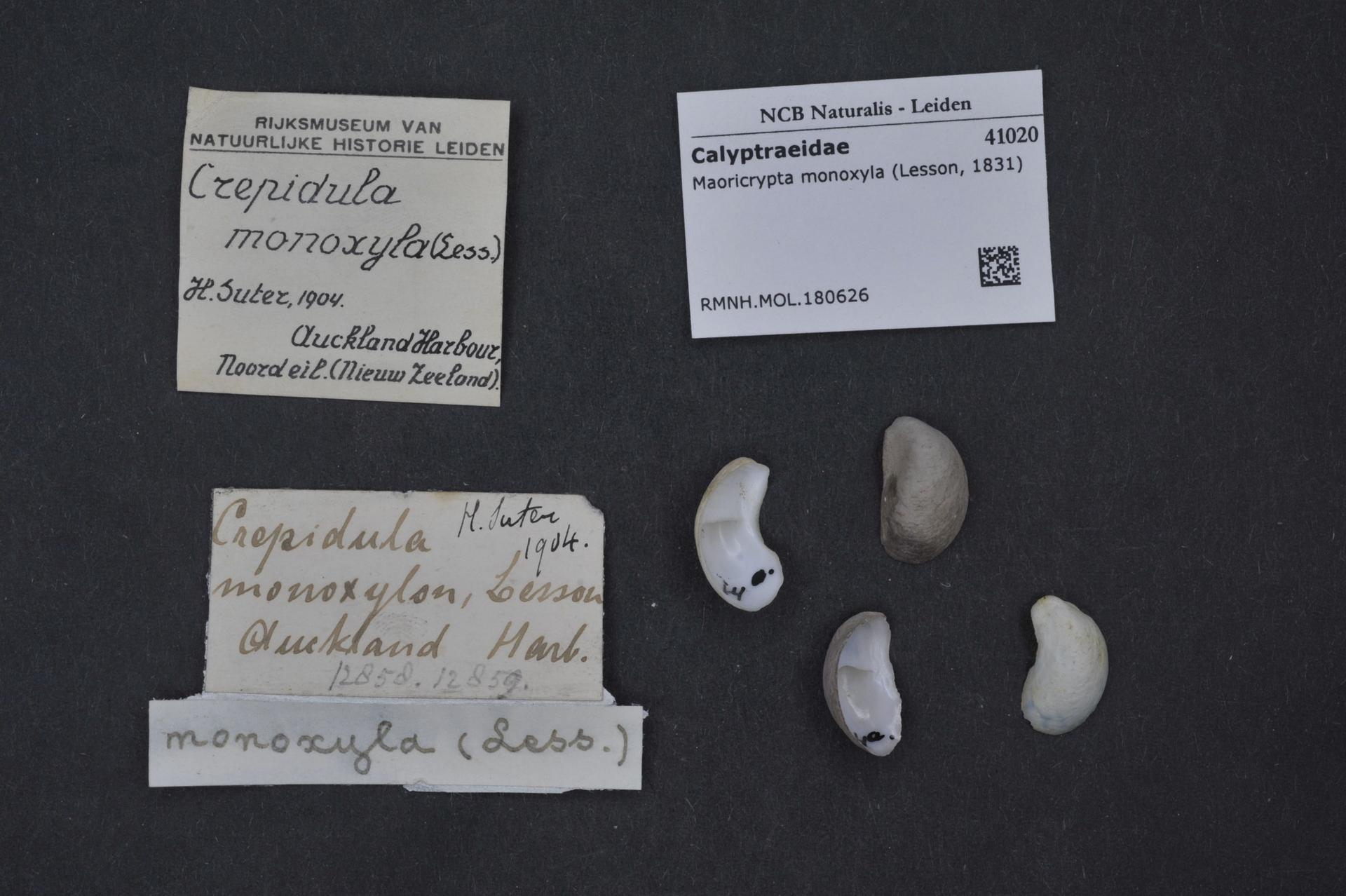

Scientific classification
- Kingdom: Animalia
- Phylum: Mollusca
- Class: Gastropoda
- Subclass: Caenogastropoda
- Order: Littorinimorpha
- Family: Calyptraeidae
- Genus: Maoricrypta
- Species: M. monoxyla

Binomial name
- Maoricrypta monoxyla Lesson, 1831

= Maoricrypta monoxyla =

Species of gastropod

Maoricrypta monoxyla is a species of small sea snail or slipper snail, a marine gastropod mollusc in the family of Calyptraeidae. This species is found in New Zealand. It can grow to a length of 30mm with a width of 25mm.
