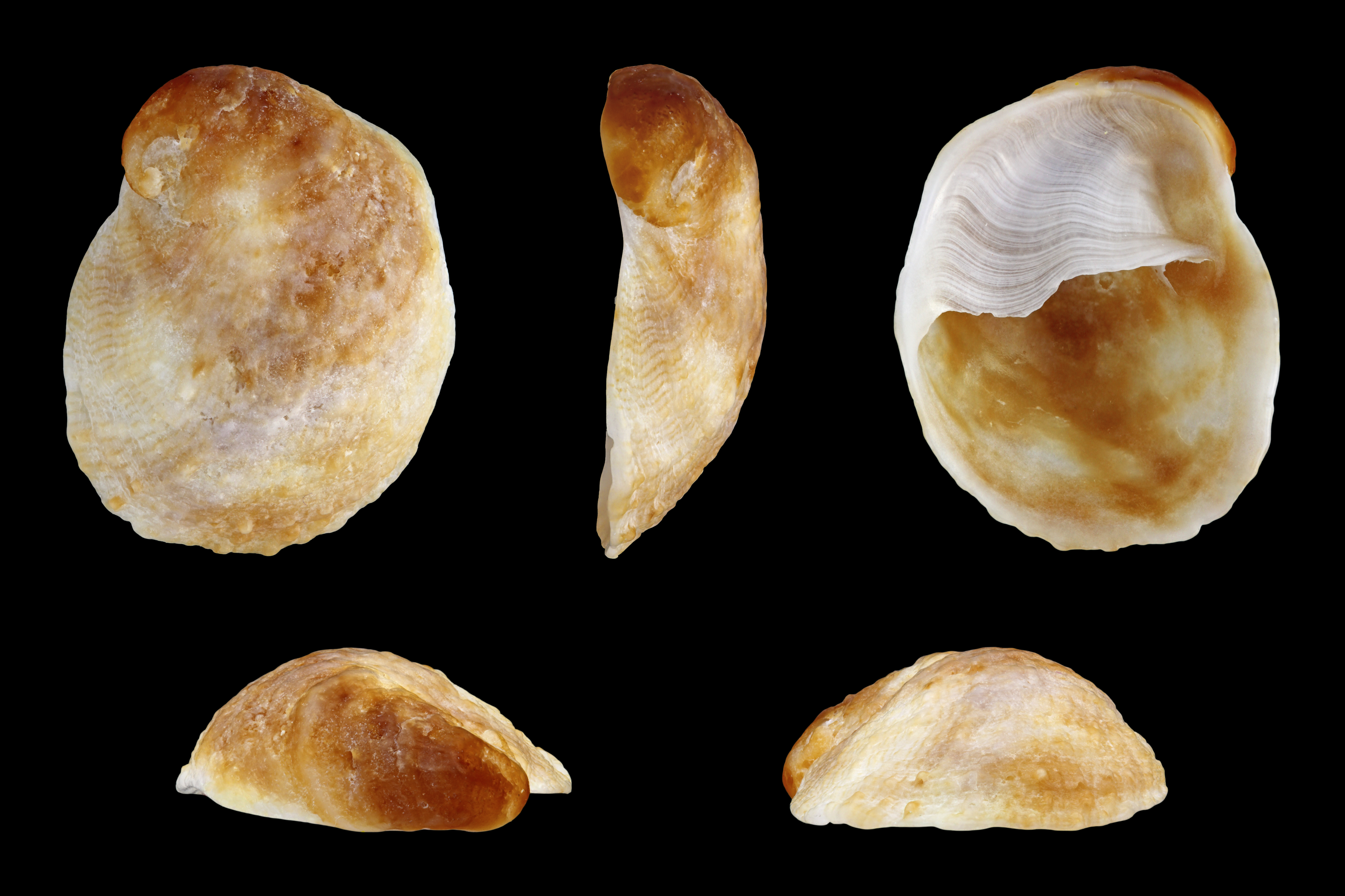

Scientific classification
- Kingdom: Animalia
- Phylum: Mollusca
- Class: Gastropoda
- Subclass: Caenogastropoda
- Order: Littorinimorpha
- Family: Calyptraeidae
- Genus: Bostrycapulus
- Species: B. aculeatus

Binomial name
- Bostrycapulus aculeatus (Gmelin, 1791)

Synonyms
- Patella aculeata Gmelin, 1791; Crepidula aculeata (Gmelin, 1791)

= Bostrycapulus aculeatus =

Species of gastropod

Bostrycapulus aculeatus is a species of sea snail in the family Calyptraeidae, the slipper snails or slipper limpets, cup-and-saucer snails, and hat snails.

== Distribution ==
This species occurs in Florida and the Bahamas.

== Description ==
The maximum recorded shell length is 30 mm.

== Habitat ==
The minimum recorded depth for this species is 0 m; maximum recorded depth is 80 m.
