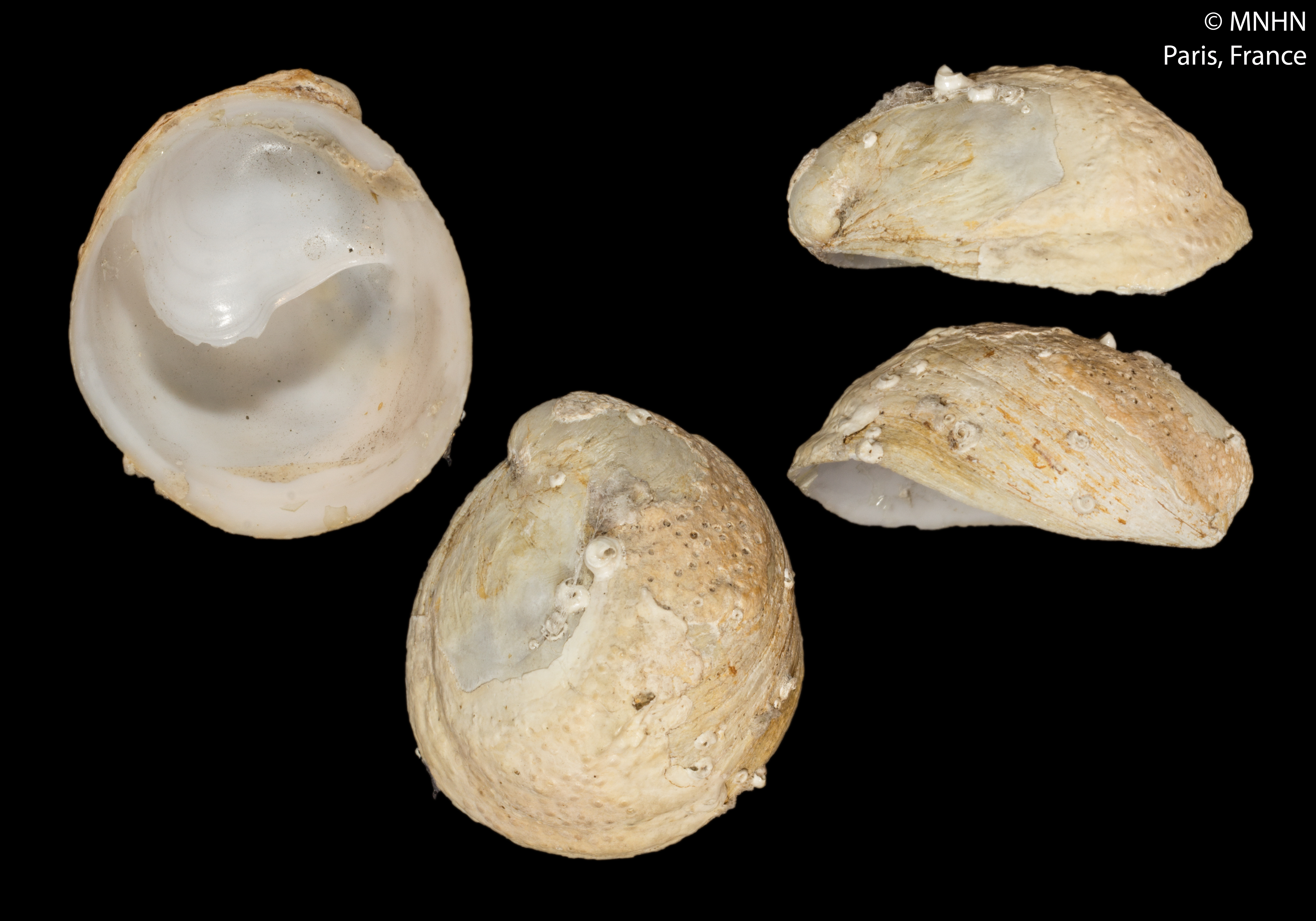
- Shell of Crepipatella dilatata

Scientific classification
- Kingdom: Animalia
- Phylum: Mollusca
- Class: Gastropoda
- Subclass: Caenogastropoda
- Order: Littorinimorpha
- Superfamily: Calyptraeoidea
- Family: Calyptraeidae
- Genus: Crepipatella; Lesson, 1831

Type species
- Calyptraea adolphei Lesson, 1831

Synonyms
- Calyptraea (Crepipatella) Lesson, 1831 (original rank); † Verticumbo Berry, 1940

= Crepipatella =

Genus of gastropods

Crepipatella is a genus of sea snails, marine gastropod mollusks in the family Calyptraeidae, the slipper snails and cup-and-saucer snails.

The snails in this genus were formerly all thought to belong to the genus Crepidula, but DNA sequence data show that they are a separate genus.

A recent revision of the South American species has led to some significant taxonomic changes, as well as the addition of a new species - Crepipatella occulta Veliz et al. 2012.

== Species ==
Species within the genus Crepipatella include:

- Crepipatella capensis (Quoy and Gaimard, 1832–33) This species is known from the upwelling area of South Africa around Cape Town. These animals have direct development where embryonic nutrition is provided by nurse embryos (termed adelphophagy). C. capensis is sister to the C.dilatata-C. peruviana clade.
- Crepipatella charybdis (Berry, 1940)
- Crepipatella dilatata (Lamarck, 1822). A very common and well-studied species that occurs along the coast of Chile and Argentina. Development proceeds with uncleaved nurse eggs. The shells are often a purple-ish brown with a white streak. This species has been introduced to the northern coast of Spain.
- Crepipatella dorsata (Broderip, 1834). This species is a very rare, small, ribbed species of Crepipatella that occurs along the Pacific coast of Panama. The mode of development in unknown.
- Crepipatella foliacea (Broderip, 1834)
- Crepipatella lingulata (Gould, 1846). Native to the Pacific coast of North America with a clear range from Southern California though Washington and Alaska, this species has planktotrophic development. This species was often referred to as C. dorsata in the past, but it is clearly distinct.
- Crepipatella occulta Veliz et al. 2012. This species is known from only two sites in Chile. It is characterized by a chestnut colored shell and adelphophagic development
- Crepipatella patagonica (d'Orbigny, 1841)
- Crepipatella peruviana (Lamarck, 1822)

Species brought into synonymy

- Crepipatella fecunda (Gallardo, 1979). Recent taxonomic work has indicated that this large, pale species of Crepipatella is synonymous with Crepipatella peruviana Lamarck. This species is common along the coast of Chile and up into Peru and is characterized by planktotrophic development.
- Crepipatella fluctuosa Taki, 1938: synonym of Crepidula dorsata (Broderip, 1834)
- Crepipatella orbiculata (Dall, 1919): synonym of Crepipatella lingulata (Gould, 1846)
