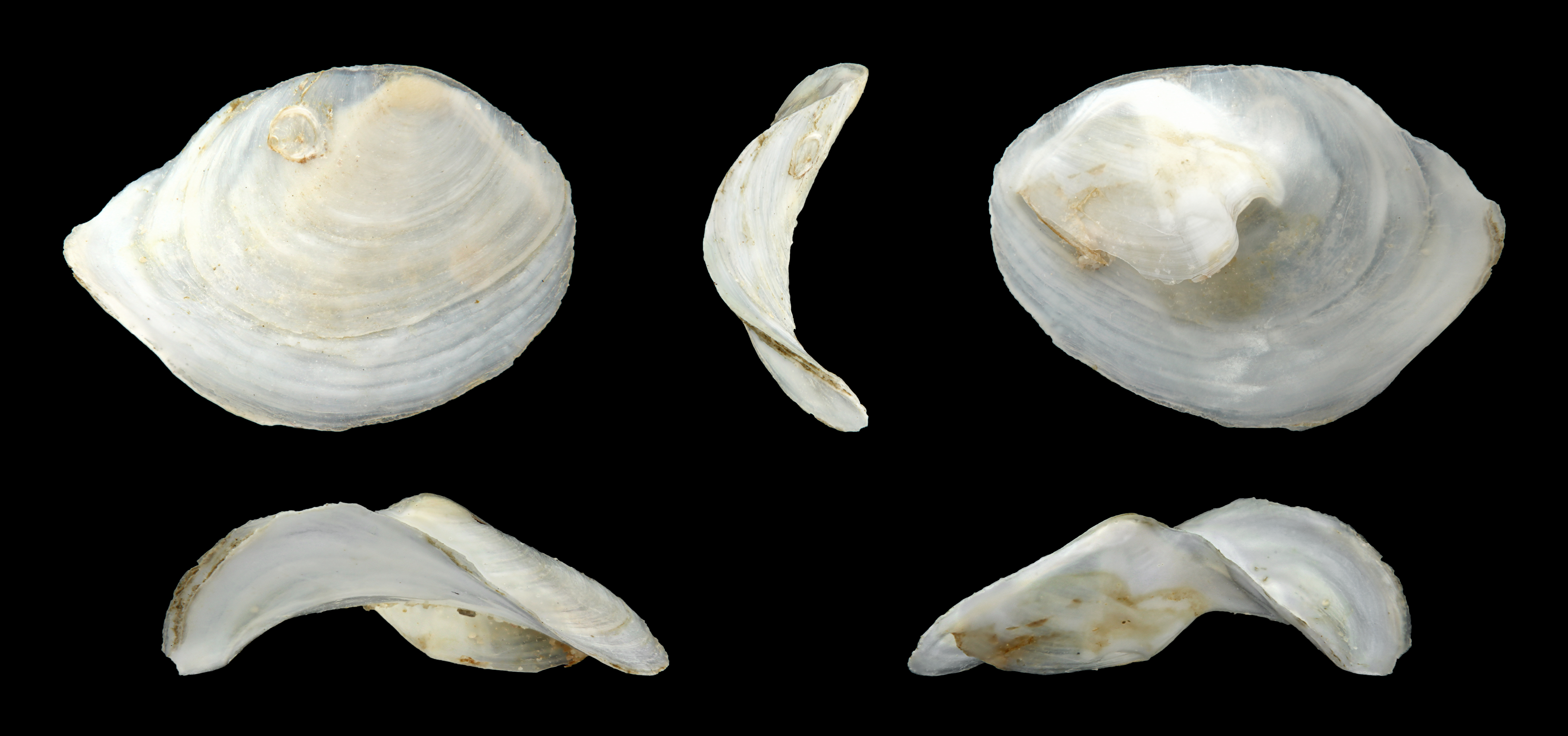
- Ergaea walshi

Scientific classification
- Kingdom: Animalia
- Phylum: Mollusca
- Class: Gastropoda
- Subclass: Caenogastropoda
- Order: Littorinimorpha
- Family: Calyptraeidae
- Genus: Ergaea; H. Adams & A. Adams, 1854
- Species: E. walshi

Binomial name
- Ergaea walshi (Reeve, 1859)

Synonyms
- Calyptraea plana A. Adams & Reeve, 1850; Calyptraea scabies Reeve, 1859; Crepidula (Ergea) scutum K. Martin, 1884; Crepidula excisa R. A. Philippi, 1849; Crepidula orbella Yokoyama, 1920; Crepidula ostraeiformis Grabau & S. G. King, 1928; Crepidula plana (A. Adams & Reeve, 1850); Crepidula scabies (Reeve, 1859); Crepidula walshi Reeve, 1859; Crypta (Ergaea) walshi (Reeve, 1859); Crypta lamellosa A. Adams, 1862; Crypta walshi (Reeve, 1859); Siphopatella walshi (Reeve, 1859)

= Ergaea =

Monotypic genus of gastropod

Ergaea is a monotypic genus of sea snail in the family Calyptraeidae. Its sole accepted species is Ergaea walshi, commonly known as the eastern white slipper limpet. This marine species can be found along Vietnam and Japan. The size of an adult shell varies between 13 mm and 41 mm.
