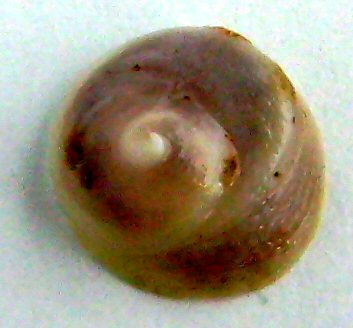
- A shell of Sigapatella novaezelandiae

Scientific classification
- Kingdom: Animalia
- Phylum: Mollusca
- Class: Gastropoda
- Subclass: Caenogastropoda
- Order: Littorinimorpha
- Superfamily: Calyptraeoidea; Lamarck, 1809
- Family: Calyptraeidae; Lamarck, 1809

Type genus
- Calyptraea

Genera
- See text

Synonyms
- Crepidulidae Fleming, 1822; Galerinae Gray, 1857; Cryptinae Gray, 1868; Dispotaeinae Gray, 1868; Ergeinae Gray, 1868; Mitrellinae Gray, 1868 (inv.); Trochitinae Gray, 1868

= Calyptraeidae =

Family of gastropods

The Calyptraeidae are a family of small to medium-sized marine prosobranch gastropods.

This family includes the slipper snails (Crepidula species), the Chinese hat snails, (Calyptraea species), and the cup-and-saucer snails (Crucibulum species) among others.

The Calyptraeidae are the only family in the superfamily Calyptraeoidea. This family has no subfamilies according to the taxonomy of the Gastropoda by Bouchet & Rocroi, 2005.

Crepidula fornicata was transported to Europe on imported American oysters in the late 19th century and is now considered a significant pest in European oyster beds.

== Description ==
Internally, the shell is distinguished by a shelf-like, cup-like, or half-cup-like structure used for muscle attachment. Some calyptraeids have shells that externally resemble those of limpets, so species in the genus Crepidula are often called slipper limpets. However, these snails are not closely related to true limpets and are more closely related to conches and cowries. The "slipper" in the name "slipper limpet" is based on the appearance of the inside of the shell, which with its half-shelf resembles a traditional western bedroom slipper.

== Reproduction ==
Calyptraeids may form a tower of up to 25 animals, sometimes referred to as a mating chain. The bottom snail is always female. When she dies, the male above her will change from male to female, and the chain continues.

== Genera ==
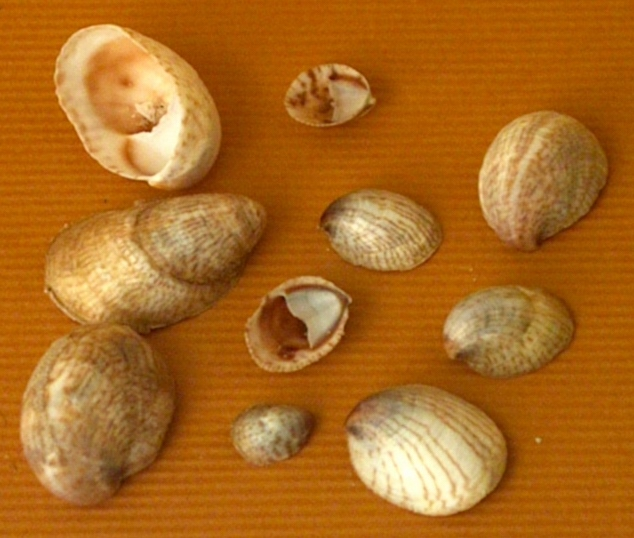
Shells of Crepidula fornicata

Genera within the family Calyptraeidae include:

- Bicatillus Swainson, 1840
- Bostrycapulus Olsson & Harbison, 1953
- Calyptraea Lamarck, 1799
- Crepidula Lamarck, 1799
- Crepipatella Lesson, 1831
- Crucibulum Schumacher, 1817
- Desmaulus Rehder, 1943
- Ergaea H. Adams & A. Adams, 1854
- Grandicrepidula McLean, 1995
- Maoricrypta Finlay, 1926
- Sigapatella Lesson, 1930
- † Taimyroconus Guzhov, 2015
- Trochita Schumacher, 1817

Genera brought into synonymy

- Cheila Modeer, 1793: synonym of Cheilea Modeer, 1793 – this is actually in the Hipponicidae, not the Calyptraeidae
- Clypeola Gray, 1868: synonym of Sigapatella Lesson, 1831
- Crypta Gray, 1847: synonym of Crepidula Lamarck, 1799
- Dispotaea Say, 1824: synonym of Crucibulum Schumacher, 1817
- Galerus Gray, 1847 : synonym of Calyptraea Lamarck, 1799
- Garnotia Gray, 1857: synonym of Crepidula Lamarck, 1799
- Ianacus Mörch, 1852: synonym of Crepidula Lamarck, 1799
- Siphopatella Lesson, 1831: synonym of Syphopatella Lesson, 1831; synonym ofCrepidula Lamarck, 1799 (unjustified emendation of Syphopatella)
- Spirogalerus Finlay & Marwick, 1937 †: synonym of Sigapatella Lesson, 1831
- Syphopatella Lesson, 1831: synonym of Crepidula Lamarck, 1799
- Trochatella Lesson, 1831: synonym of Trochita Schumacher, 1817
- Trochilla Swainson, 1835: synonym of Trochita Schumacher, 1817
- Verticumbo Berry, 1940 †: synonym of Crepipatella Lesson, 1831
- Zeacrypta Finlay, 1926: synonym of Maoricrypta Finlay, 1926
- Zegalerus Finlay, 1927: synonym of Sigapatella Lesson, 1831
