= List of cicadas of New Zealand =

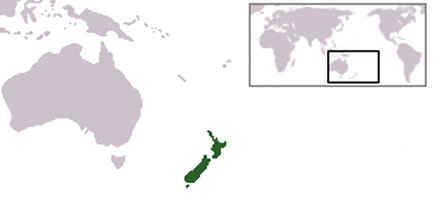
Location of New Zealand

Cicadas of New Zealand consist of Cicadidae recorded from the islands of New Zealand. The morphological taxonomy of cicadas present in New Zealand is regarded as being in its infancy. As a result, this list is likely to be subject to change.

== Amphipsalta ==
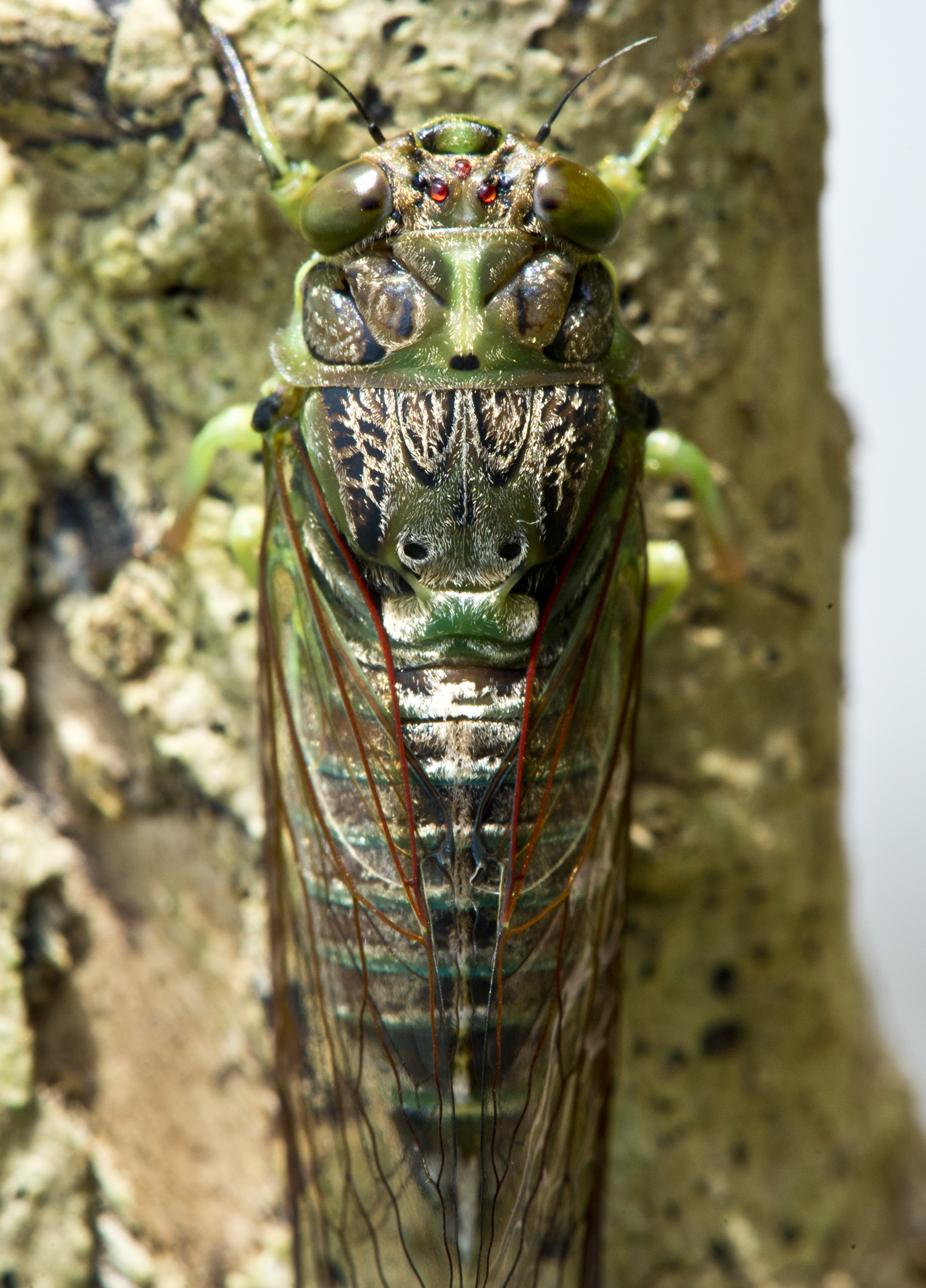
Amphipsalta zelandica (Chorus Cicada)

- Amphipsalta cingulata (Fabricius, 1775), Clapping Cicada
- Amphipsalta strepitans (Kirkaldy, 1909), Chirping Cicada
- Amphipsalta zelandica (Boisduval, 1835), Chorus Cicada

== Kikihia ==
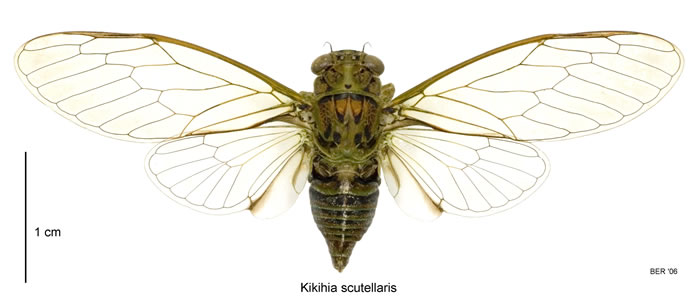
Kikihia scutellaris (Lesser Bronze Cicada)

- Kikihia angusta (Walker, 1850), Tussock Cicada
- Kikihia cauta (Myers, 1921), Greater Bronze Cicada
- Kikihia cutora cumberi Fleming, 1973, Southern Snoring Cicada
- Kikihia cutora cutora (Walker, 1850), Northern Snoring Cicada
- Kikihia cutora exulis (Hudson, 1950), Kermadec Cicada
- Kikihia dugdalei Fleming, 1984, Dugdale's Cicada
- Kikihia horologium Fleming, 1984, Clock Cicada
- Kikihia laneorum Fleming, 1984, Lane's Cicada
- Kikihia longula (Hudson, 1950), Chathams Cicada
- Kikihia muta muta (Fabricius, 1775), Variable Cicada
- Kikihia muta pallida (Hudson, 1950)
- Kikihia ochrina (Walker, 1858), April Green Cicada
- Kikihia paxillulae Fleming, 1984, Peg's Cicada
- Kikihia rosea (Walker, 1850), Pink or Murihiku Cicada
- Kikihia scutellaris (Walker, 1850), Lesser Bronze Cicada
- Kikihia subalpina (Hudson, 1891), Subalpine Green Cicada

== Maoricicada ==
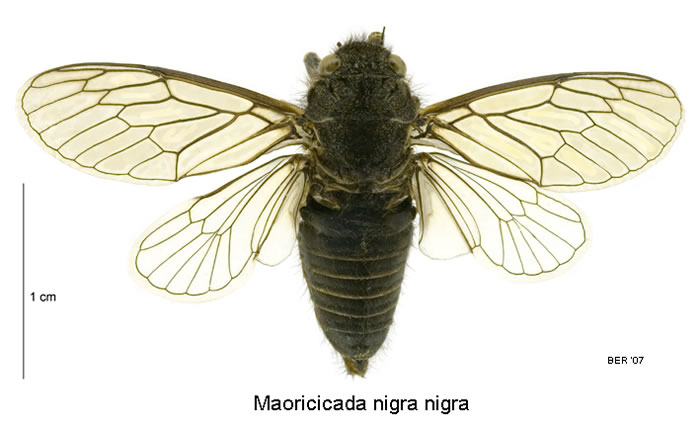
Maoricicada nigra nigra male

- Maoricicada alticola Dugdale & Fleming, 1978, High Alpine Cicada
- Maoricicada campbelli (Myers, 1923), Campbell's Cicada
- Maoricicada cassiope (Hudson, 1891), Screaming Cicada
- Maoricicada clamitans Dugdale & Fleming, 1978, Yodelling Cicada
- Maoricicada hamiltoni (Myers, 1926), Hamilton's Cicada
- Maoricicada iolanthe (Hudson, 1891), Iolanthe Cicada
- Maoricicada lindsayi (Myers, 1923), Linsay's Cicada
- Maoricicada mangu celer Dugdale & Fleming, 1978, Braying Cicada
- Maoricicada mangu gourlayi Dugdale & Fleming, 1978, Dun Mountain Cicada
- Maoricicada mangu mangu (White, 1879), Canterbury Scree Cicada
- Maoricicada mangu multicostata Dugdale & Fleming, 1978, Northern Scree Cicada
- Maoricicada myersi (Fleming, 1971), Myers' Cicada
- Maoricicada nigra frigida Dugdale & Fleming, 1978, Eastern Subnival Cicada
- Maoricicada nigra nigra (Myers, 1921), Western Subnival Cicada
- Maoricicada oromelaena (Myers, 1926), Greater Alpine Black Cicada
- Maoricicada otagoensis maceweni Dugdale & Fleming, 1978, Southern Speargrass Cicada
- Maoricicada otagoensis otagoensis Dugdale & Fleming, 1978, Otago Speargrass Cicada
- Maoricicada phaeoptera Dugdale & Fleming, 1978, Southern Dusky Cicada
- Maoricicada tenuis Dugdale & Fleming, 1978, Northern Dusky Cicada

== Notopsalta ==
- Notopsalta sericea (Walker, 1850), Clay Bank Cicada

== Rhodopsalta ==
- Rhodopsalta cruentata (Fabricius, 1775), Blood Redtail Cicada
- Rhodopsalta leptomera (Myers, 1921), Sand Dune Redtail Cicada
- Rhodopsalta microdora (Hudson, 1936), Little Redtail Cicada
