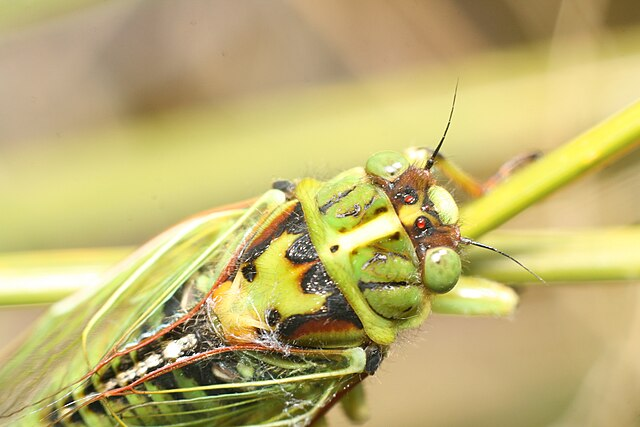
- Image of Kikihia horologium

Scientific classification
- Kingdom: Animalia
- Phylum: Arthropoda
- Clade: Pancrustacea
- Class: Insecta
- Order: Hemiptera
- Suborder: Auchenorrhyncha
- Family: Cicadidae
- Genus: Kikihia
- Species: K. horologium

Binomial name
- Kikihia horologium Fleming, 1984

= Kikihia horologium =

Species of true bug

Kikihia horologium, commonly known as the clock cicada, is a species of cicada that is endemic to New Zealand. This species was first described by Charles Fleming in 1984.

== Description ==
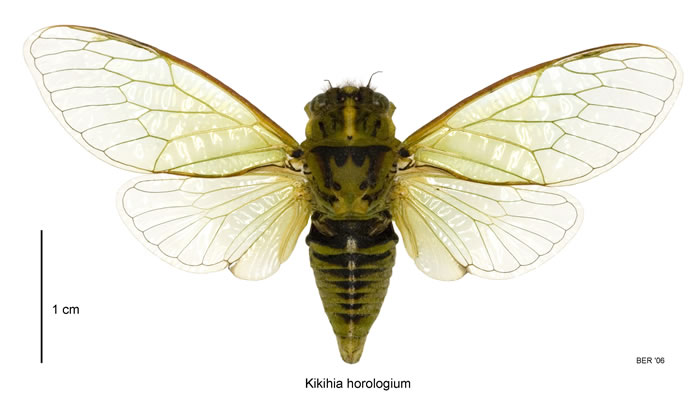
Dorsal view of Kikihia horologium

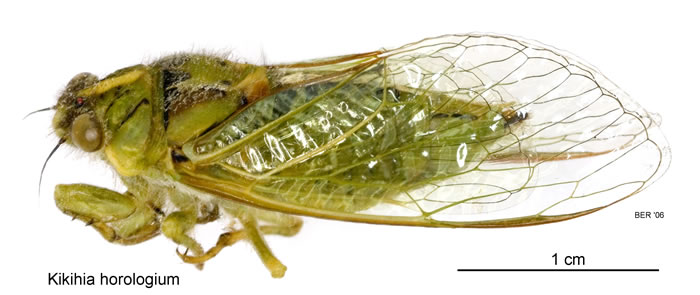
Lateral view of Kikihia horologium

Kikihia horologium is characterised by its bright green colouration with distinct dark markings on the head. A key identification feature is a yellow line running down the head and a silver stripe atop the abdomen. The venter, or underside, is entirely green. The mesonotum, or middle section of the thorax, has posterior spots that are distinct from the outer diamond-shaped markings.

Cicadas are classified as pterygote, or winged, insects within the subclass Exopterygota, meaning they undergo hemimetabolous, or incomplete, metamorphosis. This process results in gradually developing adult features with each moult. Nymphs and adults of cicadas exhibit significant morphological differences. Nymphs, which are wingless, have powerful forelegs adapted for digging, a single claw per tarsus and underdeveloped wing buds. In contrast, adult cicadas possess long, slender legs, two claws per tarsus, and fully-formed wings.

Kikihia species, like many other cicada species in New Zealand, are distinguished by their songs. The clock cicada's song, where it gets its name, resembles the rapid ticking of a clock. Male cicadas produce species-specific songs that help differentiate between species and subspecies within the genus. However, the extent to which song differences indicate separate species isn't always clear and may be undetectable without the use of oscillograms, graphical representations of acoustic sound patterns and the signals produced. The Kikihia phylogenetic tree reveals distinct song types, each associated with clear genetic subdivisions of species and subspecies. However, differentiating certain Kikihia taxa at the species or subspecies level remains challenging.

== Phylogeny ==
The genus Kikihia was first described by John Dugdale in 1972 but work by Charles Fleming in 1984 included the first formal identification of K. horologium. Prior to this classification, these Kikihia species were grouped under the genus Cicadetta.

== Range ==
Kikihia horologium is an endemic species to New Zealand. K. horologium can be found on the northern half of the South Island. This species primarily inhabits subalpine shrublands along the South Island's Southern Alps, stretching from the Kaikoura Ranges to Aoraki/Mount Cook.

== Habitat ==
When Fleming expanded the Kikihia genus, the species were categorised into three habitat-based groups: shade-singing cicadas, green foliage cicadas, and grass and scrub cicadas. He classified K. horologium to the ‘green foliage cicada’ group, which consists of species that sing on forest evergreen foliage and shrubs along the forest edge. Kikihia horologium is primarily found in upper montane and subalpine scrub vegetation, where it thrives in environments such as edges of scree slopes, riverbeds, and areas recovering from landslides. Kikihia horologium exhibits a submacropterous wing condition, meaning its wings are not fully developed for long-distance flight, potentially influencing its habitat selection and dispersal ability.

== Ecology ==
=== Life cycle and phenology ===
Acoustic insects like cicadas are known for their loud vocalisations which are crucial in locating mates for reproduction. The males generate unique, species-specific sounds in order to draw the attention of potential mates. However, Kikihia species exhibit a unique mating system compared to most other species. While female cicadas typically rely on phonotaxis, moving toward calling males, Kikihia cicadas engage in interactive duets. In this system, males call to attract females, who respond with reply signals, guiding the males toward the females. This interactive behaviour, in which males actively seek out signalling females, is rare among cicadas but has been well documented in Kikihia species.

The life cycle of K. horologium follows a multi-year developmental process. Members of the Cicadidae family have an egg stage, where a female cicada selects a suitable branch and makes small grooves in the plant tissue to deposit her eggs. Upon hatching, the tiny, newly emerged nymphs fall to the ground and dig into the soil, beginning their long developmental stage underground. During this stage, they create burrows and feeding chambers in loose soils. Kikihia horologium spends the majority of its life in the nymphal stage, slowly increasing in size underground for approximately three years. When ready to become an adult, the final instar nymph surfaces from the soil, usually at night over several hours, and climbs onto the first vegetation it encounters to undergo its last molt. This process leaves behind an empty exoskeleton, or exuviae, which can often be found clinging to tree trunks, stems, or other surfaces. The size of these shed exoskeletons varies, typically ranging from less than a centimeter to a few centimeters in length. The activity of K. horologium follows a seasonal pattern, with adults emerging from November to April. However, their peak abundance occurs between January and February, with numbers declining by March.

Adult K. horologium have a brief lifespan because their primary purpose is reproduction. After a single reproduction event, the adult cicadas die, completing their life cycle. Specific research on female fecundity, or fertility, of K. horologium is scarce. Other endemic species, like the chorus cicada (Amphipsalta zelandica), has an average fecundity of 278.5 eggs, typically laid across several nests. Nearly 80 eggs are laid in each nest of Amphipsalta zelandica. Kikihia horologium may exhibit similar reproductive patterns.

=== Diet and foraging ===
Kikihia horologium, like other cicadas, relies on the sap of plants for food and nutrients. Nymphs feed exclusively on nutrient-poor sap from the xylem, the plant tissue transporting water and dissolved nutrients, which consists of potassium, sodium, calcium, and other nutrients. This low-nutrient diet contributes to the species’ prolonged nymphal phase underground. Upon emerging as adults, they continue to feed on sap but shift to feeding on above-ground plant structures, such as tree trunks, branches, or shrubs.

== Predators, microorganisms and pathogens ==
=== Predators ===
Kikihia horologium plays a significant role in the food web, serving as prey for various arthropods and vertebrates. Native predators such as the New Zealand falcon (Falco novaeseelandiae) have been observed hunting Kikihia species, while introduced predators, including stoats (Mustela erminea) and domesticated cats (Felis catus), also prey on cicadas. Vespidae wasps have been observed preying on Kikihia muta, a related species.

Despite predation pressure, when cicada densities are exceptionally high, population booms can temporarily benefit both predators and the cicadas themselves. Large rates of emergences increase predator satiation, reducing predation pressure and increasing the number of cicadas that escape and reproduce. Additionally, cicada species are known to emerge at night which lowers the risks of predation during this vulnerable period.

=== Symbiotic microorganisms ===
Insects in the order Hemiptera have evolved intimate symbiotic relationships with microorganisms to compensate for nutritional deficiencies of its xylem-restricted diet. To overcome the lack of essential amino acids and other vital nutrients, Hemiptera insects rely on obligate microbial communities which reside within bacteriocytes, specialised cells. These obligate symbionts, such as Hodgkinia, Sulcia, and Ophiocordyceps, help synthesise these nutrients, allowing the cicada to survive and complete their life cycle despite their otherwise inadequate diet. Unlike harmful parasites, these mutualistic bacteria are crucial for the survival of cicadas.

=== Pathogenic microorganisms ===
In addition to beneficial symbionts, cicadas are also susceptible to harmful pathogenic microorganisms. Phytoplasmas, parasites that infect plant phloem, the counterpart to the xylem, have been detected in multiple species related to K. horologium. Phytoplasmas require insect vectors for transmission and are acquired when sap-feeding-insects feed on an infected plant. The bacteria must pass through the gut of the insect, replicate, invade the salivary glands, and finally enter the saliva to be transmitted to new host plants. Abundances of phytoplasmas have been found in several Kikihia species including K. paxillulae, K. muta, K. ochrina, and others, particularly in the species that inhabit lower-elevation grass and shrub habitats. Kikihia horologium could also be infected by phytoplasmas given its similar habitat preferences.

=== Fungal pathogens ===
Isaria cicadae, first described by Miquel in 1838, is a parasitic fungus that infects buried cicada nymphs and consumes the host before emerging as fungal structures. This species, along with Isaria farinosa and Isaria tenupines, targets various cicada species and is found in New Zealand native forests. The phenomenon of "vegetating" insects, where fungi grow from dead insect hosts, was first noted in cicada nymphs. Given K. horologium’s range, it is possible that this species, like other New Zealand cicadas, may also be vulnerable to fungal infections from Isaria species.

== Evolutionary history ==
Kikihia horologium belongs to an intriguing evolutionary lineage that has undergone significant radiation, with a single ancestral species rapidly diversifying into numerous distinct species. DNA analysis, both mitochondrial and nuclear, indicates that Kikihia species shares a close evolutionary history with cicadas from New Caledonia, linking them to the tribe Cicadettini. This tribe also includes cicadas from Australia. These findings suggest a biogeographic connection between New Zealand, New Caledonia, and Australia.

The ancestral species of Kikihia likely first arrived in New Zealand around 14 million years ago, during a period of substantial geological transformation. The initial diversification of the lineage began around the Miocene/Pliocene boundary; however, the main radiation within the genus took place during the Pleistocene, around three to five million years ago, because New Zealand's environments provided opportunities for ecological diversification.

== Cultural uses ==
Māori have historically consumed various cicada species, including Kikihia muta, a related species within the genus. Large numbers of nymphs from this species were collected, crushed, cooked, and consumed as a food source, highlighting their role in traditional food practices.
