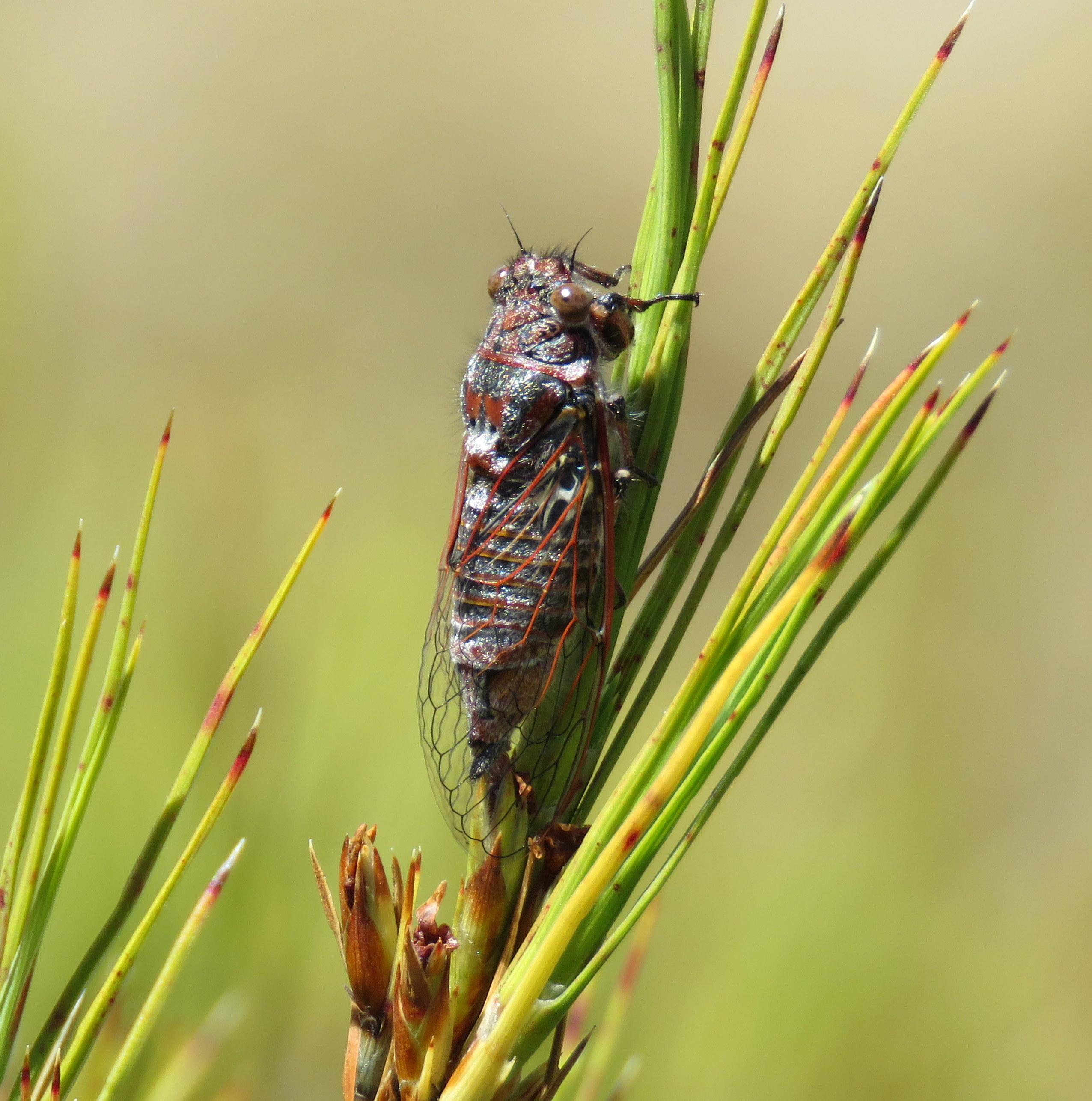
- Screaming cicada singing from Dracophyllum shrub at Korowai / Torlesse Tussocklands Park.

Scientific classification
- Kingdom: Animalia
- Phylum: Arthropoda
- Clade: Pancrustacea
- Class: Insecta
- Order: Hemiptera
- Suborder: Auchenorrhyncha
- Family: Cicadidae
- Genus: Maoricicada
- Species: M. cassiope

Binomial name
- Maoricicada cassiope (Hudson, 1891)
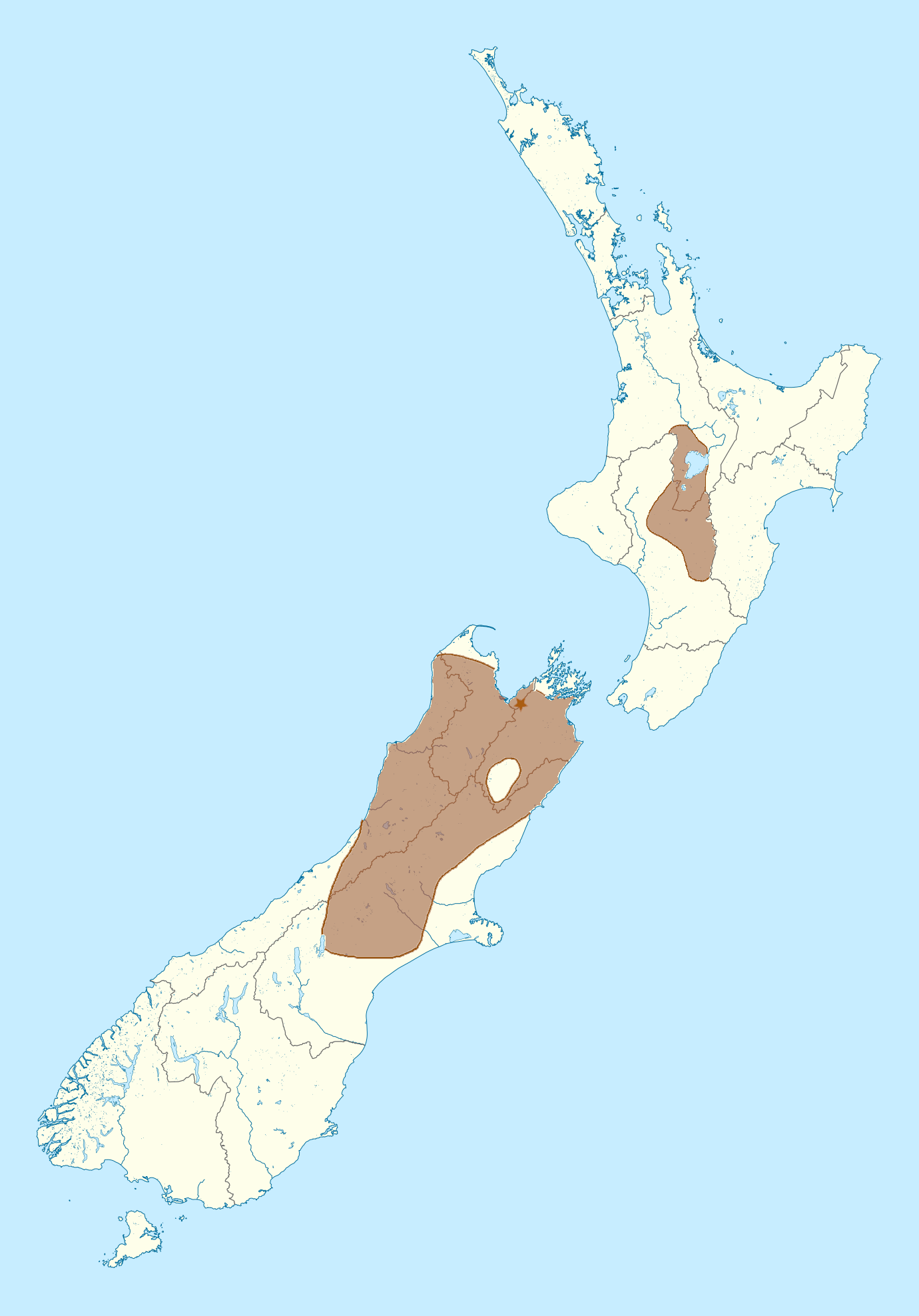
- Approximate range of M. cassiope.

Synonyms
- Cicada cassiope Hudson, 1891; Cicadetta cassiope (Hudson, 1891); Melampsalta cassiope (Hudson, 1891)

= Screaming cicada =

Screaming cicada Temporal range: Holocene–Present

Species of cicada

The screaming cicada, or Maoricicada cassiope, is a species of cicada that is endemic to New Zealand. This species was first described by George Hudson in 1891. Maoricicada cassiope can be found in mountainous regions of the North and upper South Island.

== Classification ==
Maoricicada cassiope was first scientifically described in 1891 (Note: Hudson presented the paper which described the new species on 23 July 1890 to the Wellington Philosophical Society. The paper was published in May of 1891 in the 1890 volume of the Transactions and Proceedings of the New Zealand Institute. The author citation generally used thus gives the year as 1891.) by George Vernon Hudson in the Transactions and Proceedings of the New Zealand Institute. Hudson placed it in the genus Cicada but still used the specific epithet cassiope, though he did not record why. In 1974 the species, along with several others, was transferred into the recently-erected genus Maoricicada.

Maoricicada cassiope was first collected in February 1885 at Dun Mountain, near Nelson. It is one of several Auchenorrhyncha ("Homoptera") species first discovered there: Novothymbris zealandica (Cicadellidae), Aka duniana (Cixiidae), and Thanatodictya tillyardi (Dictyopharidae) were also described from Dun Mountain. Hudson left no holotype specimen in his description six years later. As such, C. A. Fleming and R. G. Ordish designated the Dun Mountain specimen as the species' lectotype. Many early records of M. cassiope are unreliable, as specimens of similar cicada species were incorrectly labelled as M. cassiope by authors into the 1920s.

== Distribution ==
Scatterplot comparing the range of M. cassiope, the related M. campbelli, and the more lowland Kikihia muta. Each point represents one verified observation on the citizen science platform iNaturalist. All "Research Grade" observations of M. cassiope were included, while samples of similar size were used for the other two species.

During the Last Glacial Period, ice covered most of the South Island. It is believed that Maoricicada cassiope remained in refugia in the northern end of the island near Nelson before expanding southwards as the ice retreated. Its present distribution includes subalpine areas in the northern half of the South Island: inland in Marlborough and Tasman, particularly arount Mount Arthur, and down the mountainous spine of the island between Canterbury and Westland as far south as, approximately, the Rakaia River, south of which other Maoricicada species dominate. John Dugdale and Charles Alexander Fleming put the southern limit of M. cassiope's range at southern Canterbury; however, George Vernon Hudson described the species as being found as far south as Lake Wakatipu in Otago. On the North Island, Maoricicada cassiope has been recorded at Mount Ruapehu in Tongariro National Park and the area around it, in an inland area covering the northeastern portion of Manawatū–Whanganui in and around the national park, and south to around Taihape and Mangaweka, though it has also been recorded as far south as the Wairarapa. In terms of altitude, M. cassiope is usually found in verdant areas between 910 and 1,400 metres (3,000 and 4,500 feet) above sea level. At lower altitudes, below 1,200 metres (4,000 ft), it is replaced by a variety of the variable cicada.

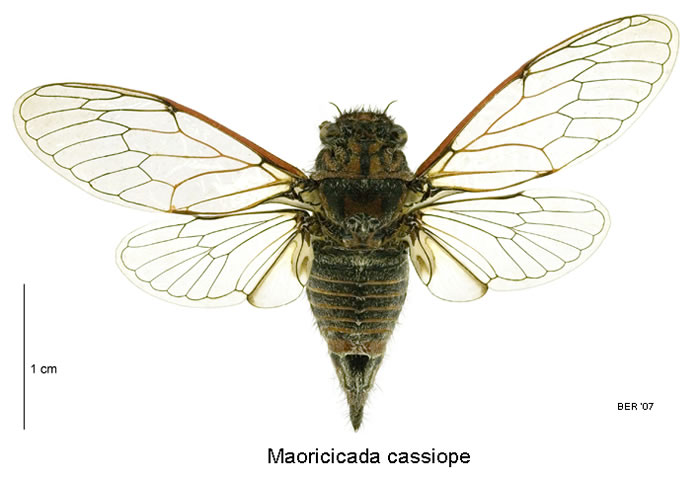
Female specimen

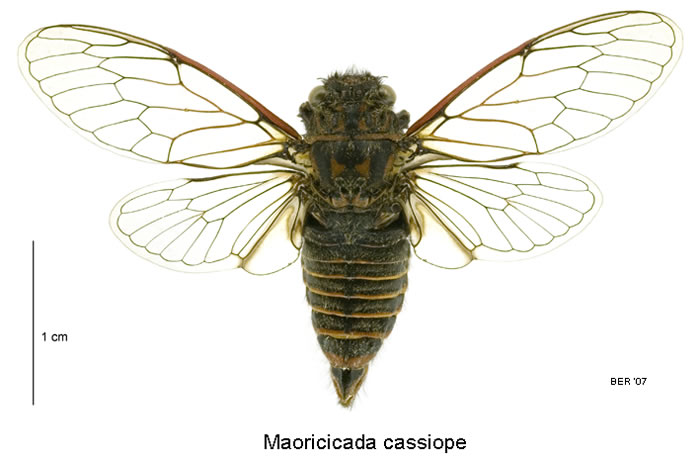
Male specimen

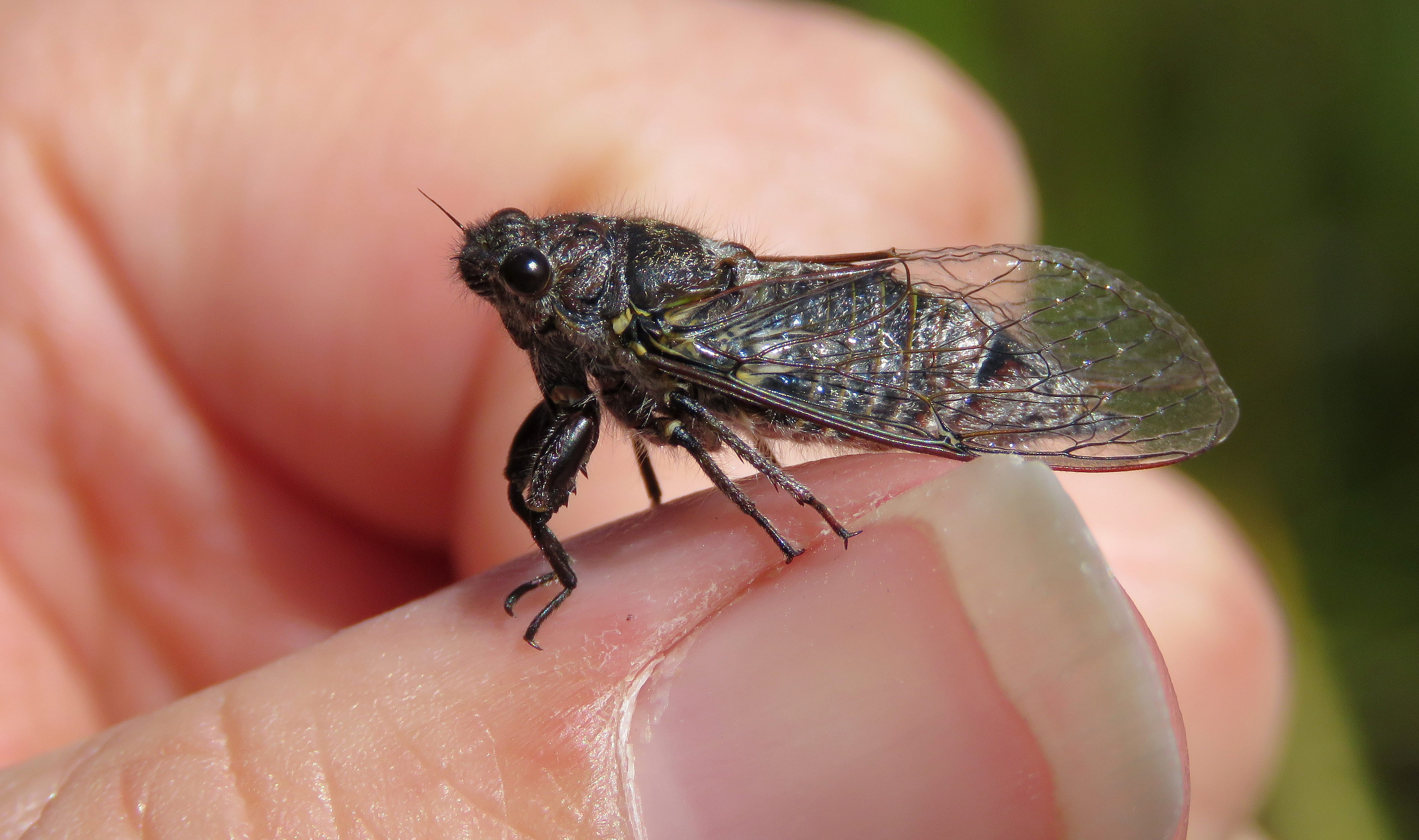
Female perched on finger along the Otira Valley Track, Arthur's Pass National Park.

== Bibliography ==
- Dugdale, John S.; Fleming, Charles A. (1978). "New Zealand cicadas of the genus Maoricicada (Homoptera: Tibicinidae)". New Zealand Journal of Zoology. 5 (2): 295–340. doi:10.1080/03014223.1978.10428319.
- Fleming, Charles A. (26 April 1975). "Adaptive radiation in New Zealand cicadas". Proceedings of the American Philosophical Society. 119 (3): 298–306. ISBN 978-1-4223-7106-0.
- Hudson, George V. (1950). Fragments of New Zealand Entomology. Lambton Quay: Ferguson & Osborn Ltd.
- Hudson, George V. (May 1891). "On the New Zealand Cicadæ". Transactions and Proceedings of the New Zealand Institute. 23: 49–58.
- Lariviere, M.-C.; Fletcher, M. J.; Larochelle, A. (2010). Auchenorrhyncha (Insecta: Hemiptera): catalogue. Fauna of New Zealand 63. Lincoln, Canterbury, New Zealand: Manaaki Whenua Press.
