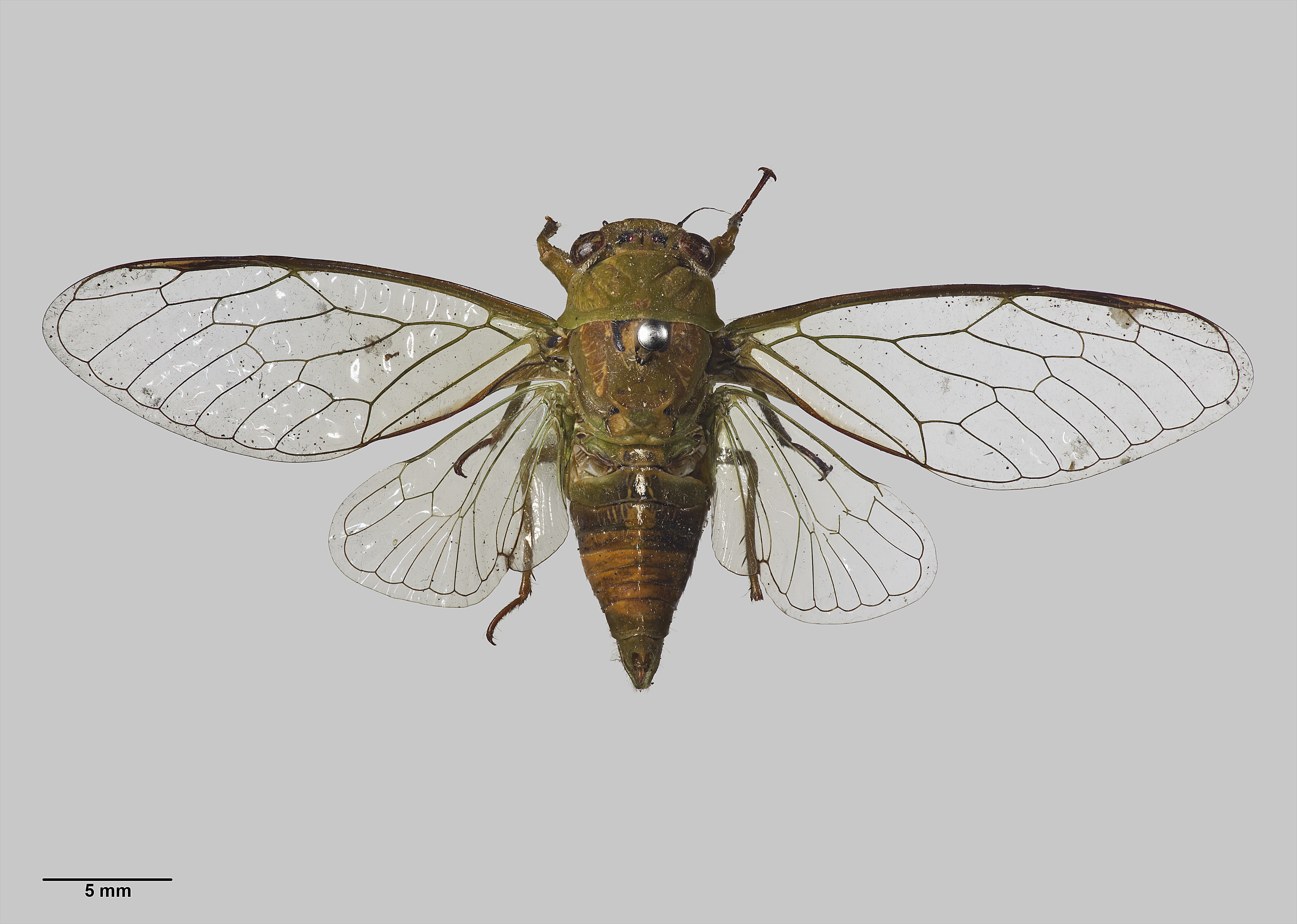
- Kikihia ochrina specimen held at Auckland Museum

Scientific classification
- Kingdom: Animalia
- Phylum: Arthropoda
- Clade: Pancrustacea
- Class: Insecta
- Order: Hemiptera
- Suborder: Auchenorrhyncha
- Family: Cicadidae
- Tribe: Cicadettini
- Genus: Kikihia; Dugdale, 1972

Species
- See text

= Kikihia =

Genus of cicada insects

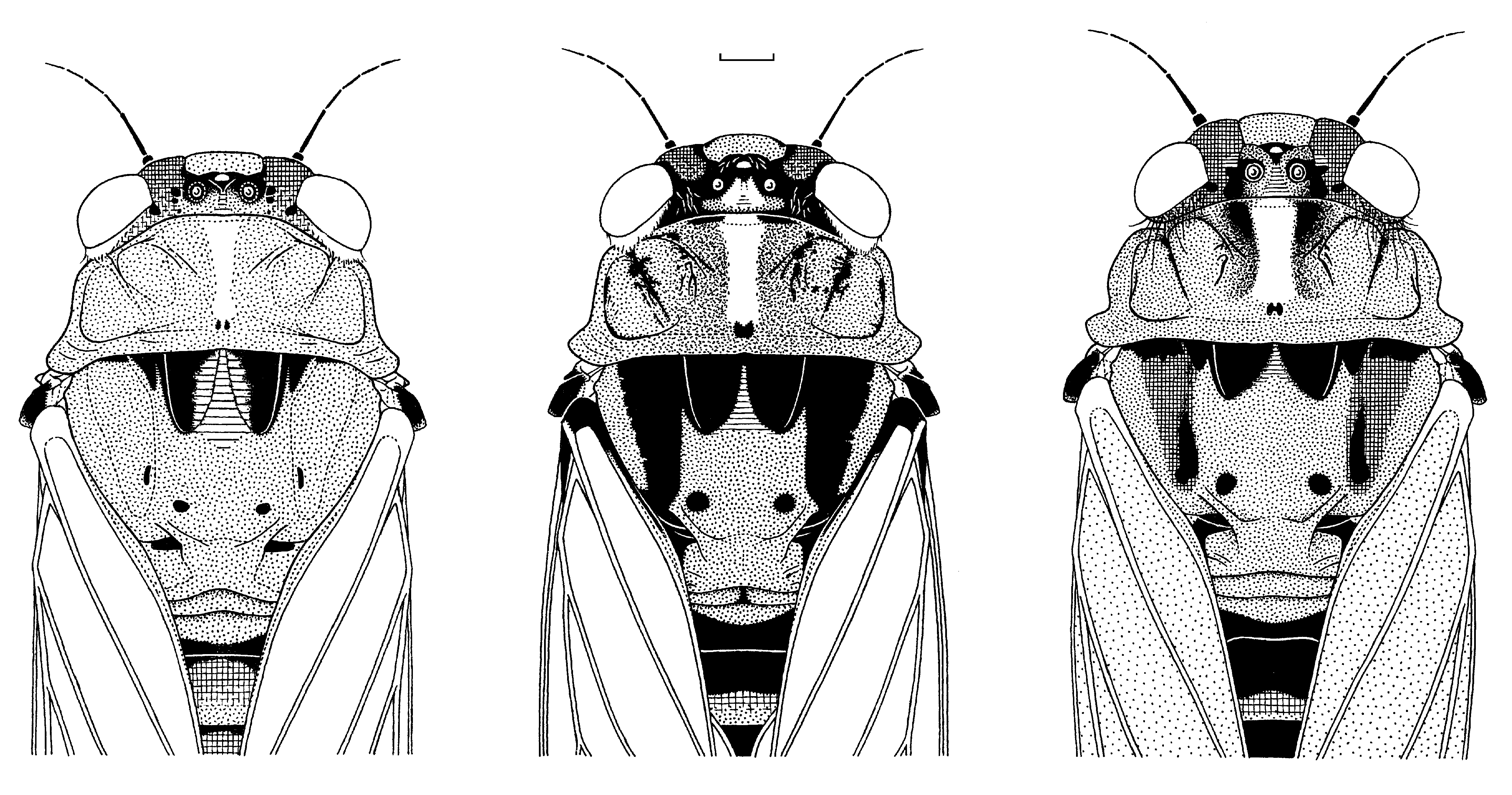
Kikihia cutora, cumberi, laneorum, subalpina illustrated by Des Helmore

Kikihia is a genus of cicada in the family Cicadidae. Most species contained in the genus are endemic to New Zealand, with a single Australian species (K. convicta) found on Norfolk Island. The genus was established in 1972 by John S. Dugdale with eleven species formerly classed within the genus Cicadetta.

== Species ==
- Kikihia angusta (Walker, 1850)
- Kikihia cauta (Myers, 1921)
- Kikihia convicta (Distant, 1892)
- Kikihia cutora cumberi Fleming, 1973
- Kikihia cutora cutora (Walker, 1850)
- Kikihia cutora exulis (Hudson, 1950)
- Kikihia dugdalei Fleming, 1984
- Kikihia horologium Fleming, 1984
- Kikihia laneorum Fleming, 1984
- Kikihia longula (Hudson, 1950)
- Kikihia muta muta (Fabricius, 1775)
- Kikihia muta pallida (Hudson, 1950)
- Kikihia ochrina (Walker, 1858)
- Kikihia paxillulae Fleming, 1984
- Kikihia rosea (Walker, 1850)
- Kikihia scutellaris (Walker, 1850)
- Kikihia subalpina (Hudson, 1891)

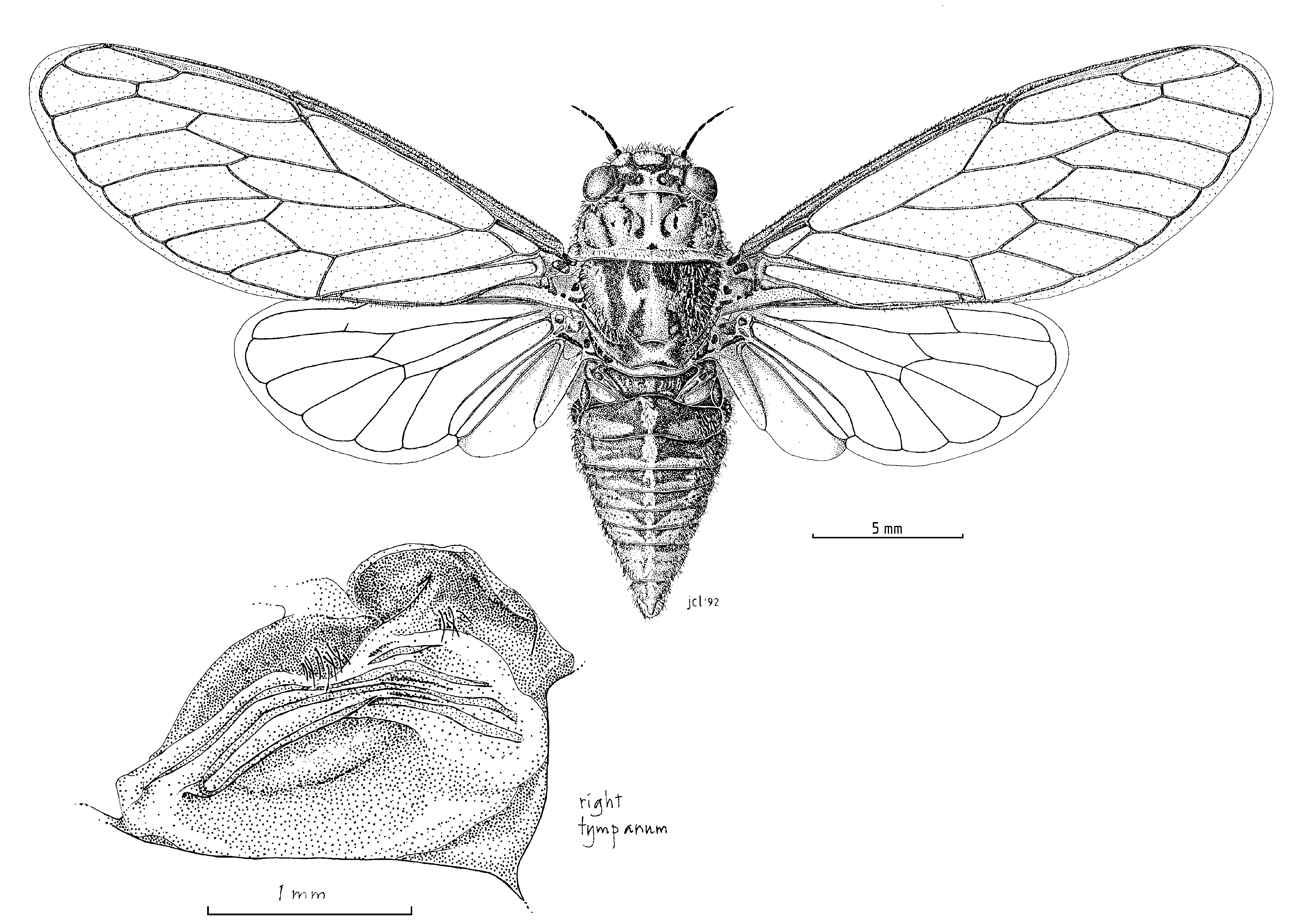
Kikihia illustrated by Des Helmore.
