= Kikihia convicta =

Scientific classification
- Kingdom: Animalia
- Phylum: Arthropoda
- Clade: Pancrustacea
- Class: Insecta
- Order: Hemiptera
- Suborder: Auchenorrhyncha
- Family: Cicadidae
- Genus: Kikihia
- Species: K. convicta

Binomial name
- Kikihia convicta (Distant, 1892)

Synonyms
- Melampsalta convicta Distant, 1892

Species of cicada

Kikihia convicta, also known as the Norfolk Island cicada, is a species of cicada in the true cicada family, Cicadettinae subfamily and Cicadettini tribe. It is endemic to the Australian territory of Norfolk Island in the south-west Pacific Ocean. It was described in 1892 by English entomologist William Lucas Distant.

== Description ==
The cicadas are green in colour, but fade to yellow after death. The length of the forewing is 19–22 mm.

== Distribution and habitat ==
The species occurs only on Norfolk Island. The associated habitat is low shrubland, including disturbed areas.

== Behaviour ==
Adults are heard from October to April, clinging to the trunks and branches of small trees and shrubs, uttering calls characterised by an initial series of phrases morphing into a simple chirping song.
