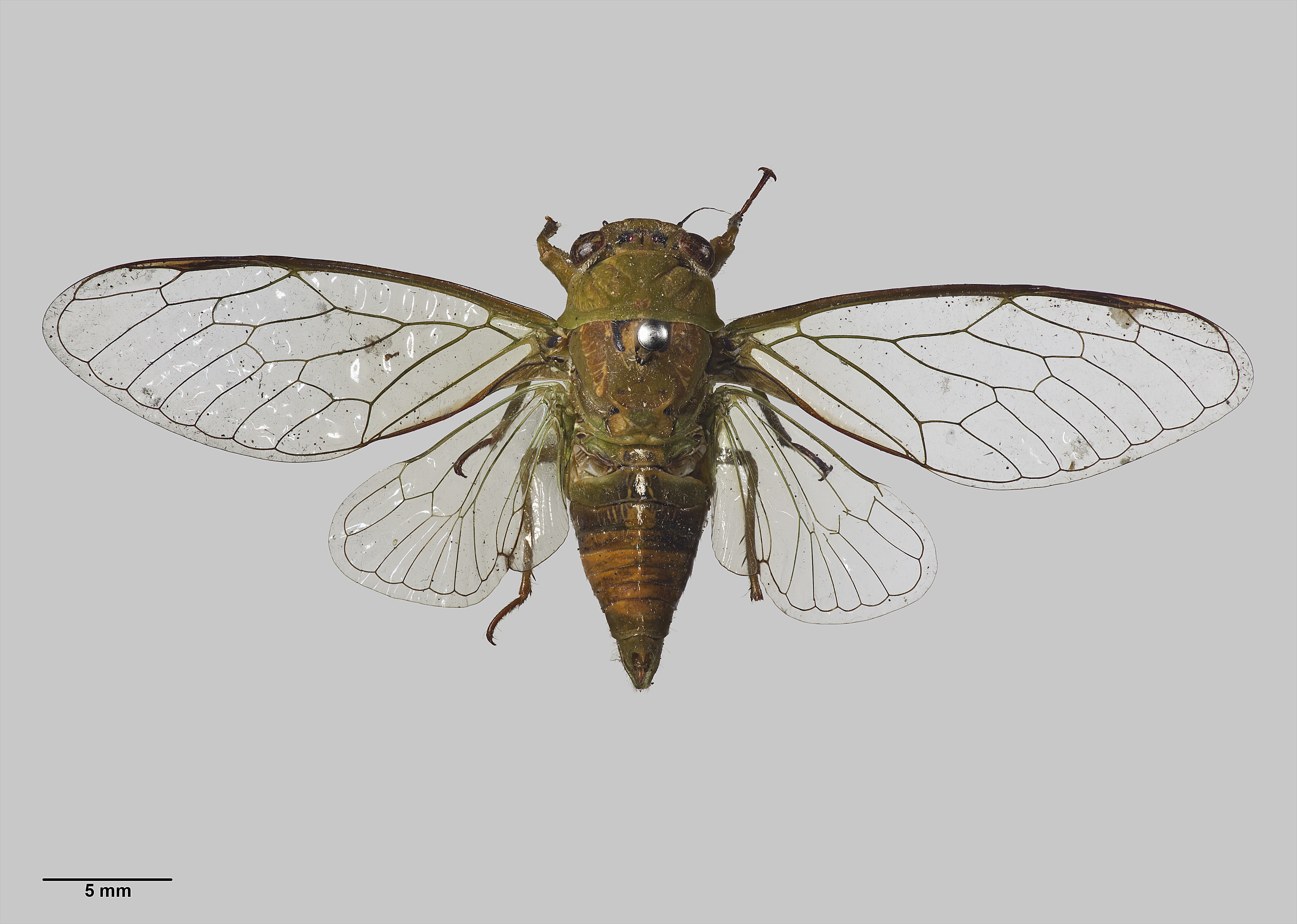
- Female syntype specimen
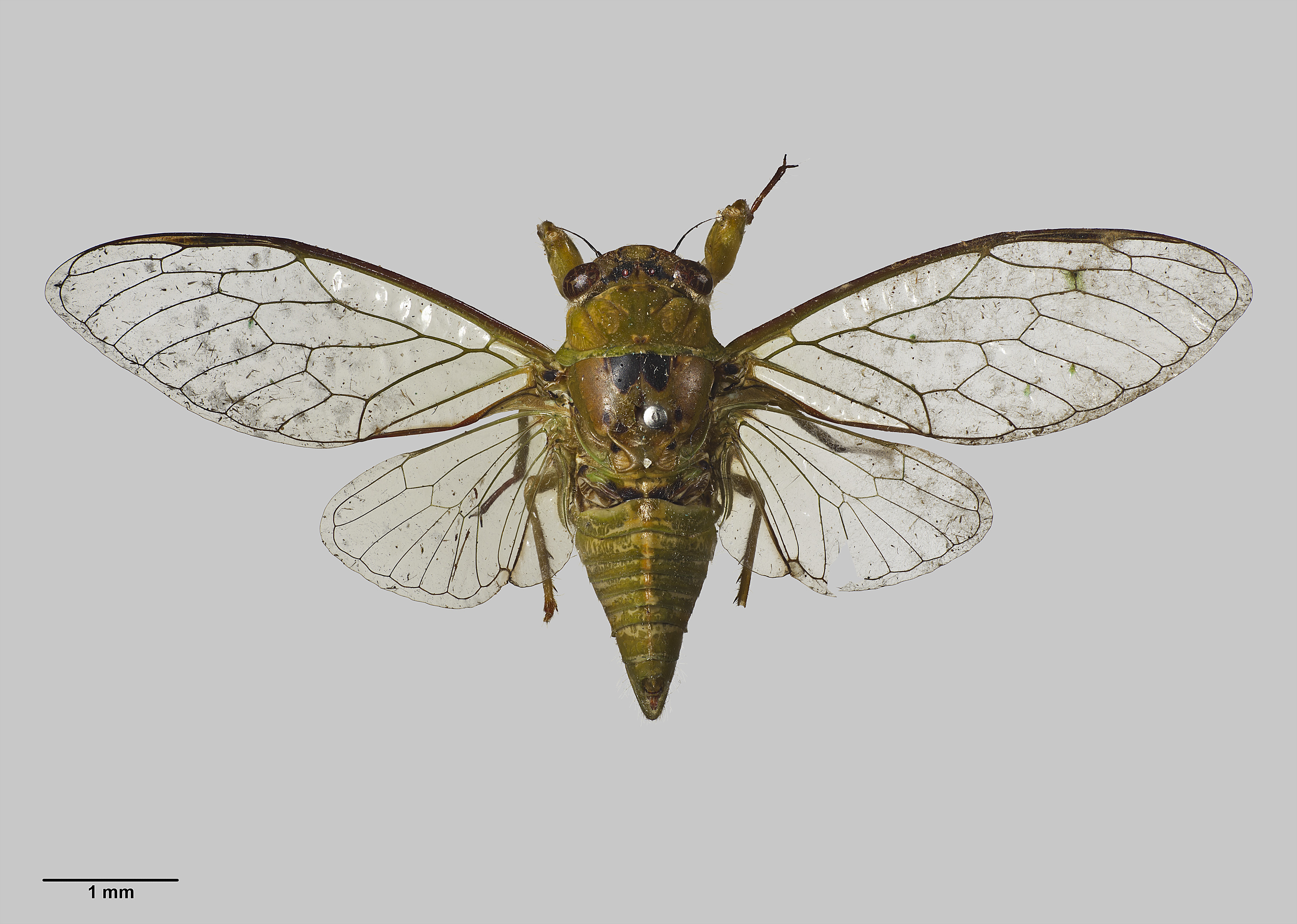
- Male syntype specimen

Scientific classification
- Kingdom: Animalia
- Phylum: Arthropoda
- Class: Insecta
- Order: Hemiptera
- Suborder: Auchenorrhyncha
- Family: Cicadidae
- Genus: Kikihia
- Species: K. ochrina

Binomial name
- Kikihia ochrina (Walker, 1858)

Synonyms
- Cicada aprilina Hudson, 1891; Cicada ochrina Walker, 1858; Cicada orbrina Kirby, 1896; Cicadetta aprilina; Cicadetta ochrina; Kikihia aprilina; Melampsalta muta ochrina; Melampsalta ochrina

= Kikihia ochrina =

Species of cicada endemic to New Zealand

Kikihia ochrina (commonly known as the April green cicada) is a species of insect endemic to New Zealand. This species has a three-year life cycle and adults are bright green in colour and are most commonly seen in the month of April in the North Island.

== Taxonomy ==
The British entomologist Francis Walker first described K. ochrina in 1858 as Cicada ochrina from a specimen presented to the Natural History Museum, London by Colonel Daniel Bolton. George Hudson described K. ochrina in 1891 and, thinking it was a new species, named it Cicada aprilina.

== Description ==
K. ochrina is bright green in colour with only a few dark markings, the most prominent of which are two sickle shaped lines and two dots in the middle section of the thorax. This species can be distinguished from its close relative Kikihia dugdalei as it has green legs without the pink patches that mark the legs of K. dugdalei. Male specimens of K. ochrina also always lack the pair of small black spots on their underside that are found on most male K. dugdalei specimens. The noted New Zealand entomologist George Hudson regarded it as the most beautiful of the New Zealand cicadae. He described its song as being "very quick and shrill".

== Life cycle ==
The April green cicada are present each summer. The eggs of the K. ochrina are likely to be laid from January to May with a peak at March. The eggs then develop over winter with the nymphs hatching in the summer, probably sometime in December. The eggs therefore mature over a 7 to 11-month period. Once hatched the nymphs immediately bury themselves underground whether they develop for a further two years before emerging. They then shed their exoskeleton and moult into an adult. This species has a median life cycle of approximately three years. Hudson was of the opinion that the adults of this species first appear around February but are most abundant in April.

== Distribution and habitat ==
K. ochrina is found in the North Island and the Three Kings Islands of New Zealand, as well as in Canterbury where it was likely introduced. This species inhabits evergreen trees and shrubs, particularly broad leaf natives such as Coprosma, Hebe and Myoporum as well as introduced trees such as Poplars. It commonly emerges from soil underneath the mahoe tree.

== Behaviour and predation ==
Hudson regarded this species as particularly wary of potential threats and flying off for long distances if disturbed. He hypothesized that the extreme caution of this species resulted from K. ochrina being present later in the year than other ciciadae and the species adapting to more frequent predation by birds.
