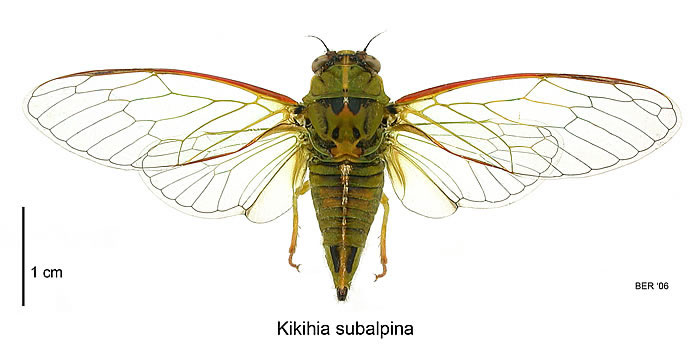

Scientific classification
- Kingdom: Animalia
- Phylum: Arthropoda
- Clade: Pancrustacea
- Class: Insecta
- Order: Hemiptera
- Suborder: Auchenorrhyncha
- Family: Cicadidae
- Genus: Kikihia
- Species: K. subalpina

Binomial name
- Kikihia subalpina (Hudson, 1891)

Synonyms
- Cicada muta sub-alpina Hudson, 1891

= Kikihia subalpina =

Species of true bug

Kikihia subalpina, commonly known as the subalpine green cicada, is a species of cicada that is endemic to New Zealand.

== Taxonomy ==
This species was first described by George Hudson in 1891 and named Cicada muta sub-alpina.

== Description ==
Green overall colour (bright green in live individuals) with lighter markings in grooves of pronotum and bold dark markings on mesonotum (often fainter than in K. horologium.); with shorter, lighter body pubescence than K. horologium. Pronotum with median yellow line. Mesonotum with trace of a narrow bright orange-red patch between nearly touching inner obconical marks. Underside of head with brownish to purple-pink genae (or cheeks) on each side of frons. Pro- and mesosternum with nearly triangular black patches. Coxae of forelegs usually with pinkish red patches. Abdomen usually with well defined dorsal median silvery stripe. Male tymbals with 2 long and 1–2 short ridges. Female pygophore generally with a thick black longitudinal mark on each side of middle dorsally. Body length: 18–22 mm (males); 20–24 mm (females). Wingspread: 46–57 mm (males); 50–62 (females).

== Range ==
New Zealand. North Island: Taranaki, Taupo, Hawke's Bay, Gisborne, Rangitikei, Wellington. South Island: Marlborough Sounds, Nelson, Kaikoura, Buller, Westland, Mid Canterbury, South Canterbury, Mackenzie, Otago Lakes, Dunedin, Fiordland. Stewart Island.

== Habitat ==
Subalpine scrub vegetation (e.g., Cassinia, Hebe, Phylocladus alpinus, Podocarpus nivalis), sometimes also in the canopy of Nothofagus solandri cliffortioides (central North Island); in scrublands on ridges down to about 100 m elevation (lower North Island); in forest canopy (e.g., Nothofagus, exotic plantations) from tree line to sea level, but rarely in true subalpine environments (South Island).
