= Notopsalta =

Scientific classification
- Kingdom: Animalia
- Phylum: Arthropoda
- Clade: Pancrustacea
- Class: Insecta
- Order: Hemiptera
- Suborder: Auchenorrhyncha
- Family: Cicadidae
- Subfamily: Cicadettinae
- Tribe: Cicadettini
- Subtribe: Cicadettina
- Genus: Notopsalta; Dugdale, 1972

Species
- See text

Genus of true bugs

Notopsalta is a small genus of cicadas in the family Cicadidae, endemic to the North Island of New Zealand.

== Species ==
- Notopsalta sericea (Walker, 1850) (New Zealand)
