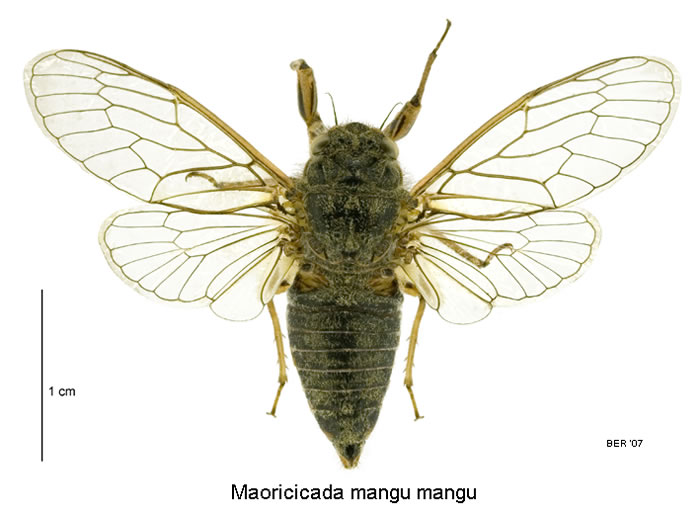
- Male Maricicada mangu mangu
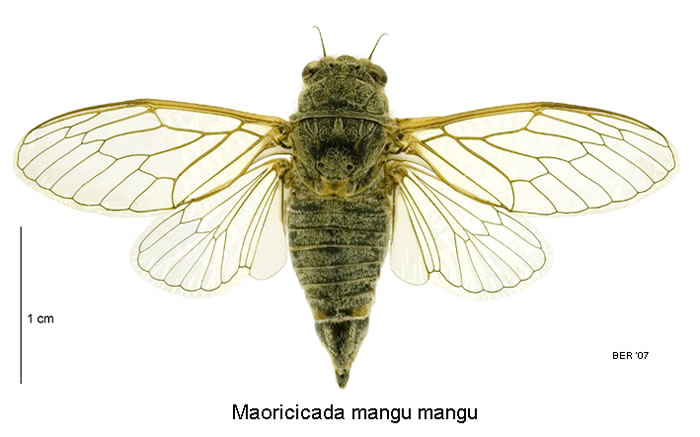
- Female Maricicada mangu mangu

Scientific classification
- Kingdom: Animalia
- Phylum: Arthropoda
- Clade: Pancrustacea
- Class: Insecta
- Order: Hemiptera
- Suborder: Auchenorrhyncha
- Family: Cicadidae
- Genus: Maoricicada
- Species: M. mangu

Binomial name
- Maoricicada mangu (White, 1879)

Synonyms
- Melampsalta mangu White, 1879

= Maoricicada mangu =

Species of true bug

Maoricicada mangu is a species of cicada that is endemic to New Zealand. This species was first described by Francis Buchanan White in 1879, as Melampsalta mangu White, based on specimens collected from Porter's Pass, Canterbury, South Island, New Zealand.

The genus Maoricicada has 14 described species, of which nine are either alpine or subalpine. Maoricicada mangu is an alpine species found in scree slopes.

New Zealand is the only country that is known to have alpine-adapted cicadas. Studies of the evolution of the species suggest that Maoricicada, along with other New Zealand alpine biota, is relatively young. It began diverging from other New Zealand cicada genera in the mid–Miocene period, during the Kaikōura orogeny around 12 Mya, when the uplift of the Southern Alps commenced. Divergence amongst the related high alpine species occurred during more recent periods of uplift.

== Subspecies ==
There are four subspecies which are distinguished by their calls or other characteristics, and occupy different geographical areas of the South Island:

- Maoricicada mangu celer Dugdale & Fleming, 1978 – braying cicada. Described from the Crimea Range, Canterbury.
- Maoricicada mangu gourlayi Dugdale & Fleming, 1978 – Dun Mountain cicada. Found in the Dun Mountains and Mt Robert, Nelson.
- Maoricicada mangu mangu (White, 1879) – Canterbury scree cicada. Distributed in the eastern side of the Southern Alps in Canterbury.
- Maoricicada mangu multicostata Dugdale & Fleming, 1978 – northern scree cicada. Distributed from Marlborough to north Canterbury.

== Distribution ==
Maoricicada mangu is endemic to the South Island of New Zealand. Three of the subspecies are found in the mountains of the northeastern South Island (Nelson, Marlborough and northern Canterbury), whereas M. mangu mangu is found in the mountains of central South Island in Canterbury.

== Gallery ==
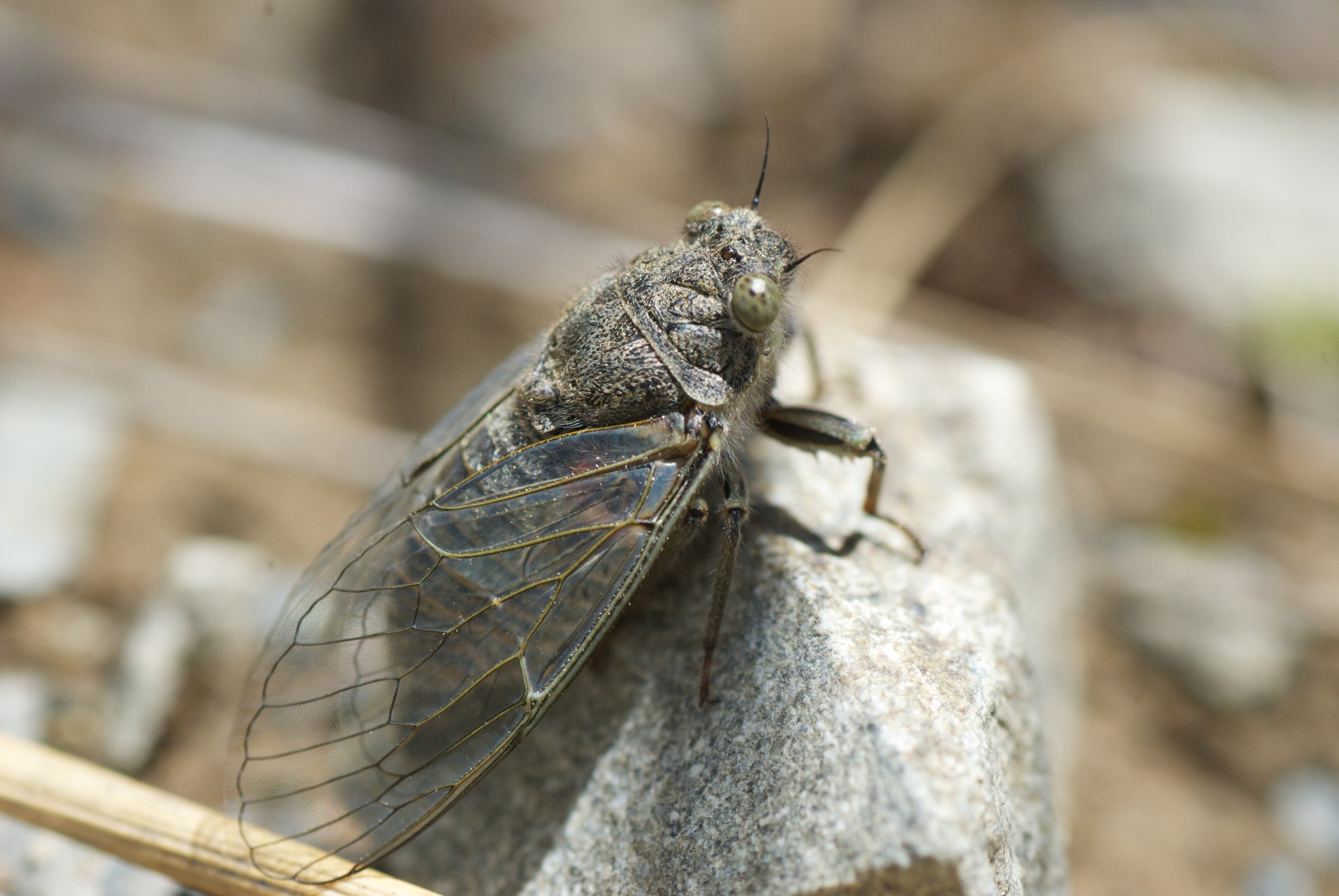

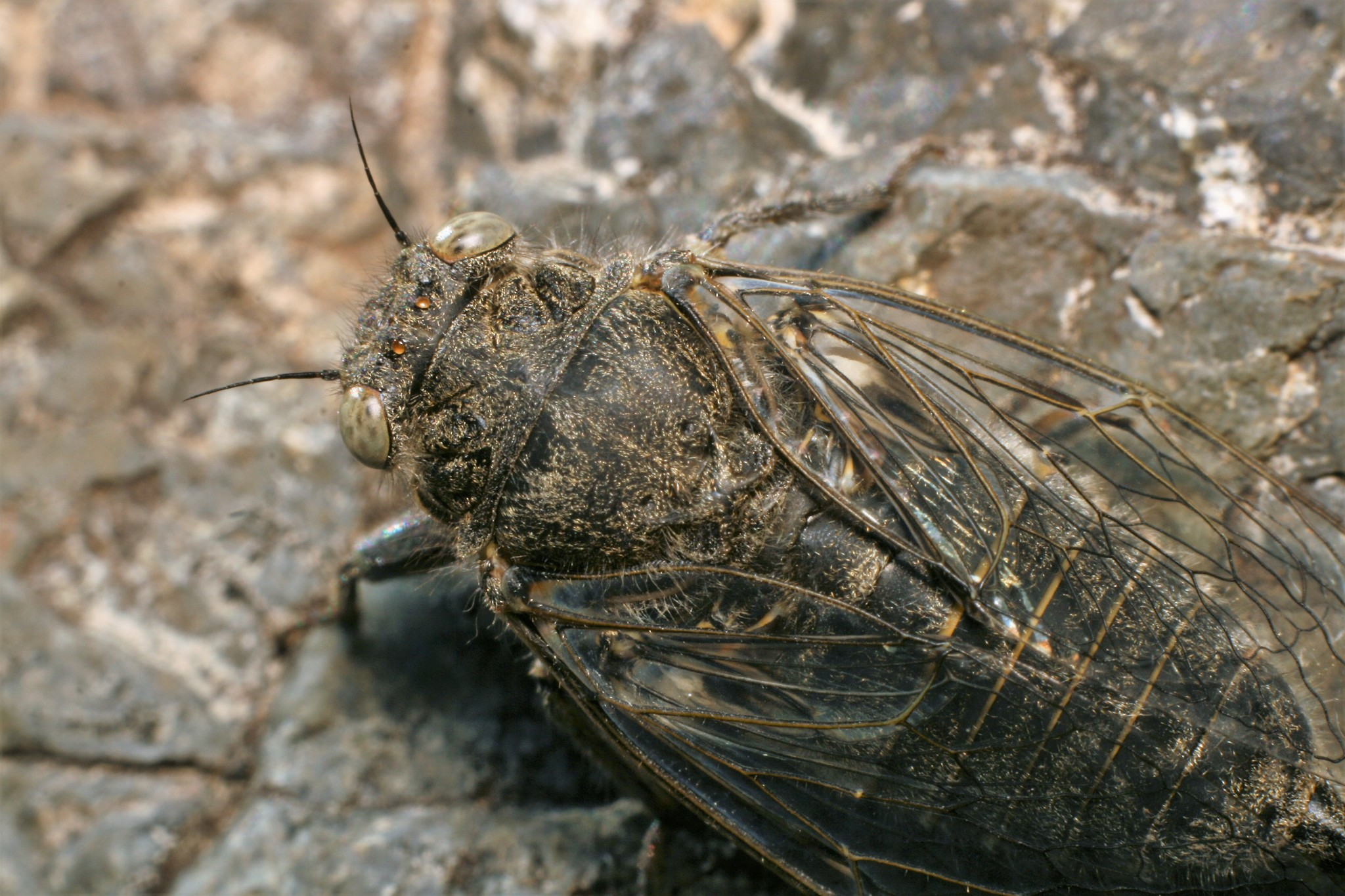

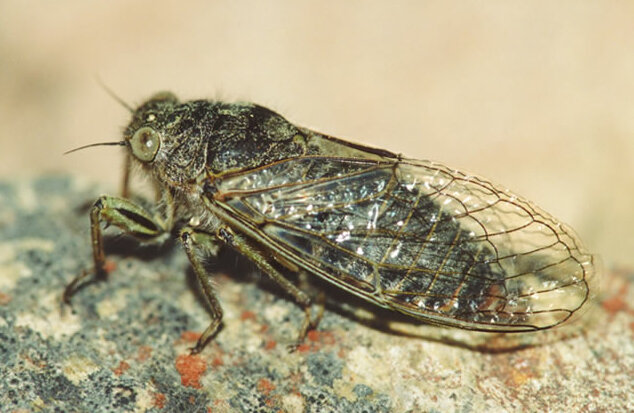

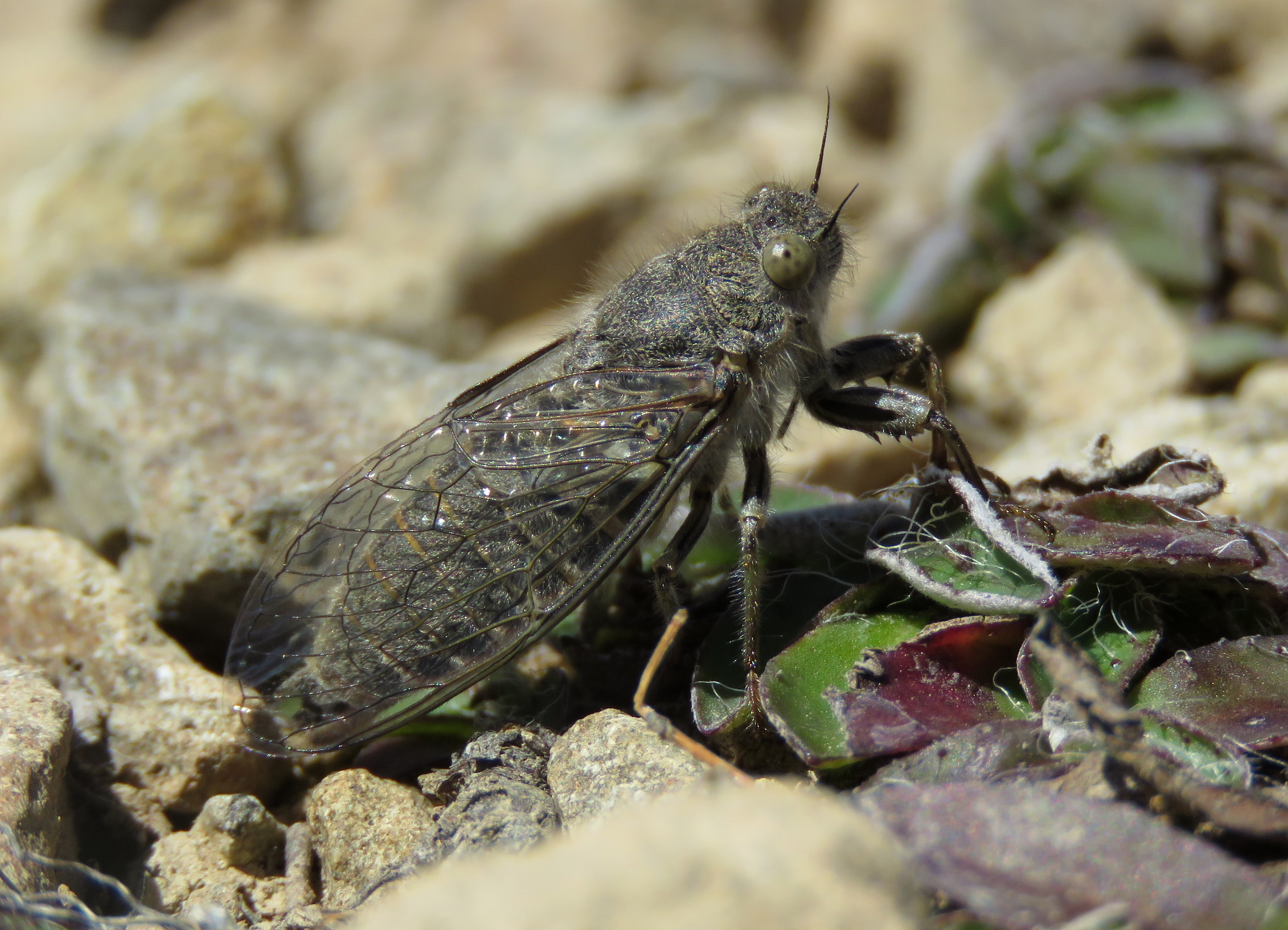
