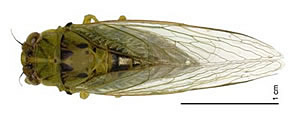

Conservation status
- Data Deficit (NZ TCS)

Scientific classification
- Kingdom: Animalia
- Phylum: Arthropoda
- Clade: Pancrustacea
- Class: Insecta
- Order: Hemiptera
- Suborder: Auchenorrhyncha
- Family: Cicadidae
- Genus: Kikihia
- Species: K. paxillulae

Binomial name
- Kikihia paxillulae Fleming, 1984

= Kikihia paxillulae =

Species of true bug

Kikihia paxillulae, commonly known as Peg's cicada, is a species of cicada that is endemic to New Zealand. This species was first described by Charles Fleming in 1984. Under the New Zealand Threat Classification System, this species is listed as "Data Deficient".
