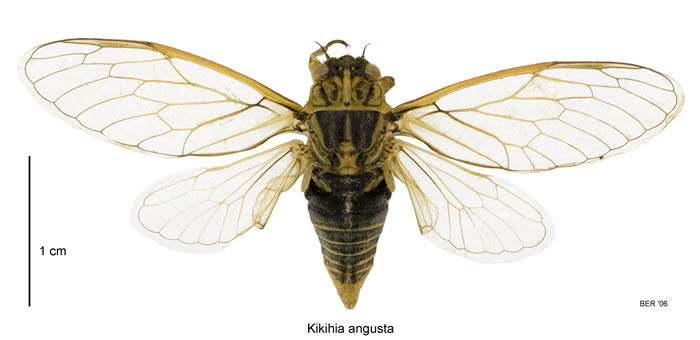

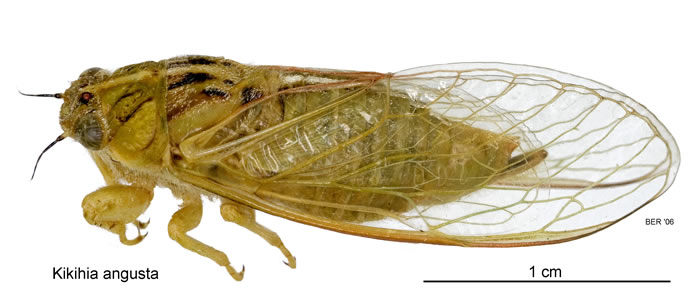

Scientific classification
- Kingdom: Animalia
- Phylum: Arthropoda
- Clade: Pancrustacea
- Class: Insecta
- Order: Hemiptera
- Suborder: Auchenorrhyncha
- Family: Cicadidae
- Genus: Kikihia
- Species: K. angusta

Binomial name
- Kikihia angusta (Walker, 1850)

Synonyms
- Cicada angustata Walker, 1850

= Kikihia angusta =

Species of true bug

Kikihia angusta, the tussock cicada, is a species of cicada that is endemic to New Zealand. This species was first described by Francis Walker in 1850.
