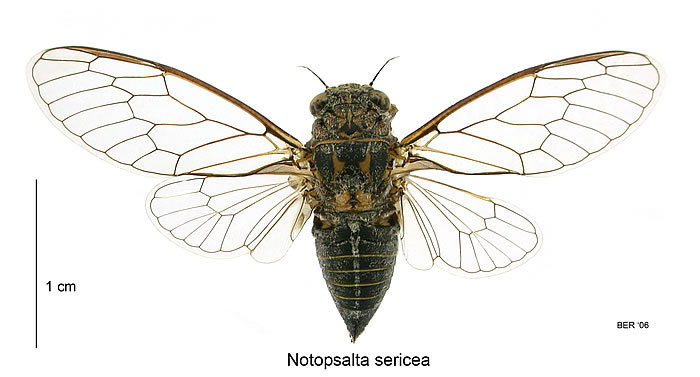

Scientific classification
- Kingdom: Animalia
- Phylum: Arthropoda
- Clade: Pancrustacea
- Class: Insecta
- Order: Hemiptera
- Suborder: Auchenorrhyncha
- Family: Cicadidae
- Genus: Notopsalta
- Species: N. sericea

Binomial name
- Notopsalta sericea Walker, 1850

= Notopsalta sericea =

Species of true bug

Notopsalta sericea, also known as the clay bank cicada, is a species of insect that is endemic to New Zealand. This species was first described by Francis Walker in 1850.

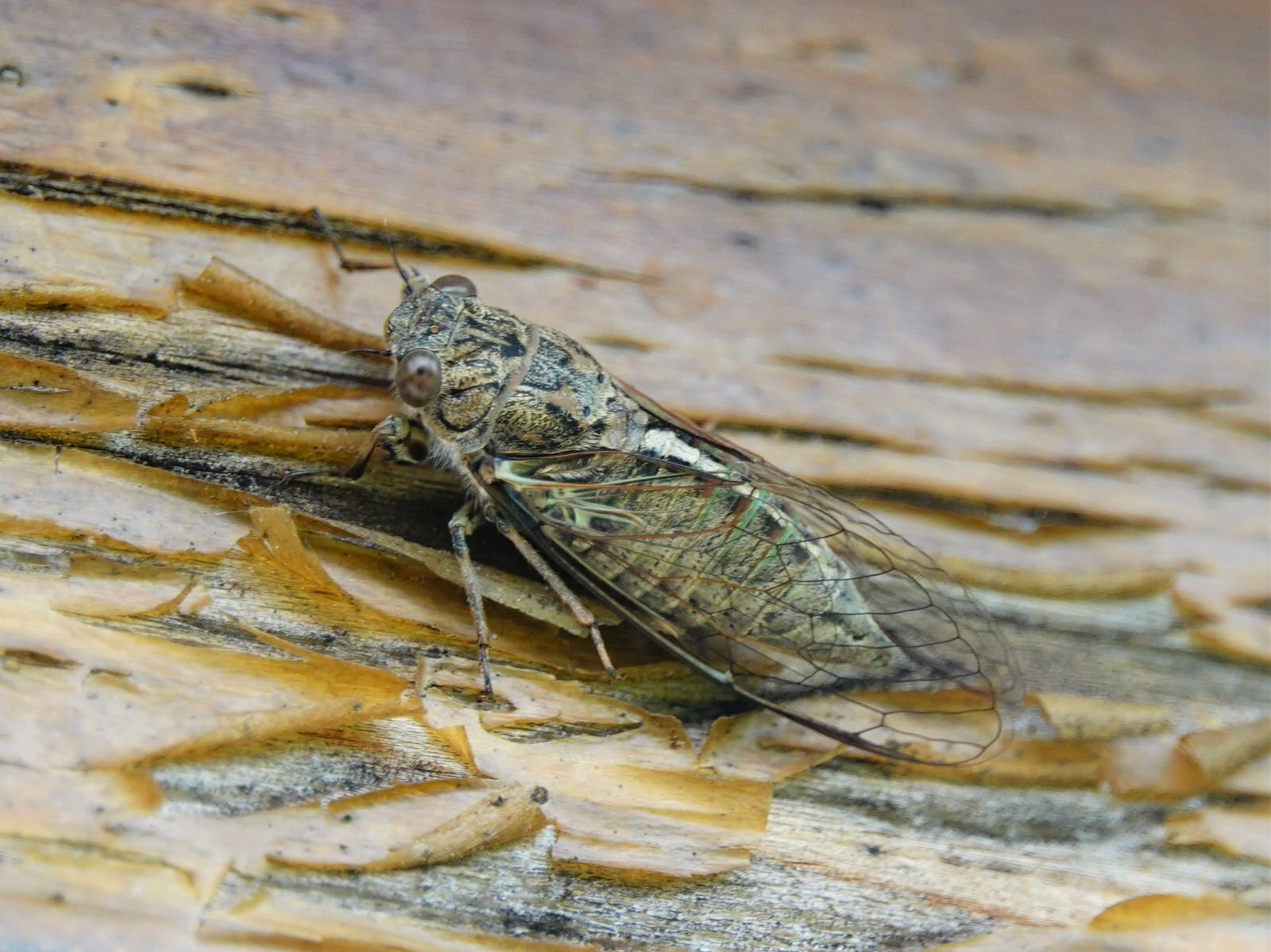
Observation of live Notopsalta sericea by iNaturalist user jacqui-nz
