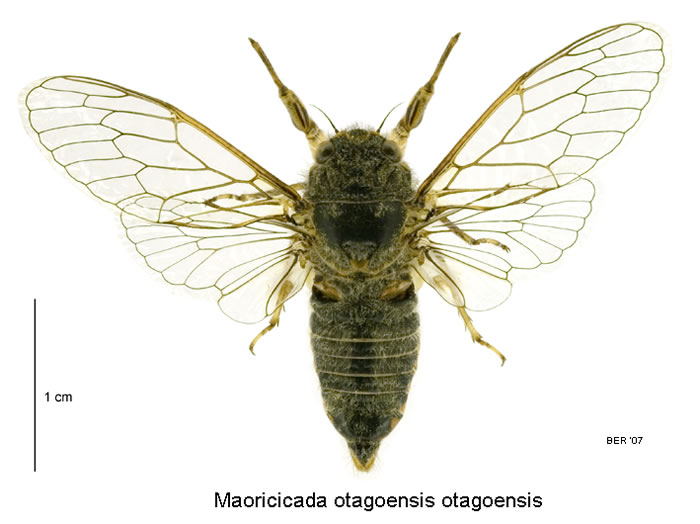
- Male Maoricicada otagoensis otagoensis
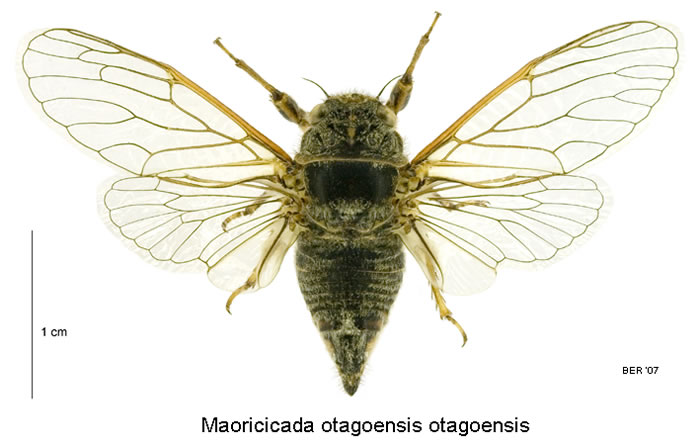
- Female Maoricicada otagoensis otagoensis

Scientific classification
- Kingdom: Animalia
- Phylum: Arthropoda
- Clade: Pancrustacea
- Class: Insecta
- Order: Hemiptera
- Suborder: Auchenorrhyncha
- Family: Cicadidae
- Genus: Maoricicada
- Species: M. otagoensis

Binomial name
- Maoricicada otagoensis Dugdale and Fleming, 1978

= Maoricicada otagoensis =

Species of true bug

Maoricicada otagoensis is a species of cicada that is endemic to New Zealand. This species was first described by John S. Dugdale and Charles Fleming in 1978.

== Taxonomy ==
=== Subspecies ===
There are two subspecies:

- Maoricicada otagoensis maceweni Dugdale & Fleming, 1978. (Southern speargrass cicada)
- Maoricicada otagoensis otagoensis Dugdale & Fleming, 1978. (Otago speargrass cicada)

== Description ==
=== Maoricicada otagoensis otagoensis ===
The males of this subspecies are 15-20 mm in length, with a wing spread of 33-41 mm. The females are 16.5-20 mm in length with a wing spread of 35-41 mm. Maoricicada otagoensis have transparent wings, with the costal vein (large vein along leading edge of wing) being pale yellow or reddish brown. In males, the dorsal surface is black with silver tomentum (dense fuzzy hair), containing orange patches on frontal ledge above antennae. The sternites (plate-like segments on the underside of the body) are horn like and pink, with dark central and proximal areas containing a black pattern. The opercula (hard shell-like flaps on the underside of the abdomen) are flesh colored with dark bases. In females, the color is similar but more pubescent, leading to a paler look. The ventral side of the body is pale yellow to pink in color. In males, the tip of the aedeagus (male reproductive organ) is rough or covered in tiny bumps on the underside. The pseudoparameres (extensions of the male genitalia) extend from the upper side. In females, the clypeus (plate-like structure on the front of the head) is pale with a black spot in the center. The copulatory tube (used to receive sperm from males during mating) has an angled shape. Genitalia in males consist of an acute pygophore beak, with the lower lobe thumb-like and inner lobe scarcely visible. The aedeagus in males is shallowly curved and expanded apically and the pseudoparameres arise dorsally. In females, the genital scale contains two dorsal ridges that are square like, and the vagina is angulate. The tymbals (sound producing structures) contain three long ridges and one short ridge. The dorsal sliver is joined to tergite, and the basal spur is short. The basal dome of the tymbal contains an appendage.

=== Maoricicada otagoensis maceweni ===
The males of this subspecies measure 17-20 mm in length, with a wing spread of 34-40 mm. Females in this subspecies are 18-21.5 mm in length, and have a wing spread ranging from 38-44 mm. The color of this subspecies is similar to Maoricicada o. otagoensis, but the sternites are more black in males. There are also more distinct boundaries between the black and orange elements in color pattern. The genitalia are similar to those of Maoricicada o. otagoensis, but in males the upper pygophore lobe is rounded apically. In females, the genital scale is sloping, rather than square. The tymbals are similar to Maoricicada o. otagoensis, but lack distal fusion of the tymbal ridges and a reduced dorsal sliver.

== Distribution and habitat ==
=== Global Range ===
Maoricicada otagoensis is endemic to New Zealand, with no recordings of existence anywhere else in the world.

=== New Zealand Range ===
This species has very few recorded sightings, and the two subspecies have been found in various different locations within the central and southern regions of New Zealand.

Maoricicada otagoensis otagoensis: This subspecies has been found in the mountains of Otago and Southland, southwest of Lake Wanaka and the Clutha River, and south to the Mararoa – Oreti gap. Maoricicada o. otagoensis has been found at altitudes of 1000-1650 m, but most commonly found below 1400 m.

Maoricicada otagoensis maceweni: This subspecies has been found in the Takitimu Range, presumably at similar altitudes and habitats to Maoricicada o. otagoensis, but all three sightings of this species have been on the western side of the mountain range.

== Habitat Preferences ==
This species is primarily found in the alpine and subalpine regions of Central Otago, where it inhabits a variety of rugged and exposed environments. It has been found on the scree slopes, shrubs, screes, tussock grasses and rocky outcrops. The males produce their characteristic singing on schist outcrops and slip scars, particularly found in degraded tussock grassland with shrubs and low scrub. These calling sites provided elevated positioning for sound projection of their song, which is essential to mate attraction. The emergence of this species has been recorded in these specific habitats.

== Life cycle and phenology ==
The life cycle of Maoricicada otagoensis starts when a female cicada cuts grooves into branches to lay their eggs using a sword-like ovipositor (tube like structure used for laying eggs). When the eggs hatch, the wingless, cream colored nymphs drop from the branches and crawl underground, using 2 claw like forelegs. They then spend the next 3-5 years feeding on root sap using their needle-like mouthparts. This species spends most of its life underground, feeding until they have grown large enough to emerge. Once the nymph reaches maturity, it burrows up, near the surface. Once conditions are suitable, the cicada nymphs emerge from the ground, and climb to a high place, most likely atop scree fields in the case of Maoricicada otagoensis. It is at this stage that they begin their final moult. During its final moult, the nymphal skin splits along the thorax and the adult cicada removes itself, hanging from its empty casing, until its wings have hardened enough to be used in flight. Adults generally live for 2-4 weeks. During this time, they will use their unique song to find a suitable female mate, leading to the female laying eggs. The adults emerge from January to February.

== Diet, prey and predators ==
=== Diet and foraging ===
Similar to the nymph stage, Maoricicada otagoensis feeds on sap found in trees in subalpine environments. Due to its short adult lifespan, Maoricicada otagoensis does not spend a lot of their adult life foraging and hunting for food. They will still spend limited time foraging for food, but their sole purpose is to find a mate and reproduce.

=== Predators, parasites and diseases ===
Predators of Maoricicada otagoensis depend on the stage of maturity that M. otagoensis is in. Parasitic wasps have been known to infest the eggs, killing them before they hatch. During nymph stage, predatory beetles and fungal diseases can be a danger because they spend most of their life in the underground nymph stage. These beetles and fungal diseases are their biggest predators. During the adult stage, Maoricicada otagoensis can be hunted by birds, especially due to their tendency to reside in large open areas. Maoricicada otagoensis can also be caught in spider webs, though it is less common for this to occur in the alpine areas.

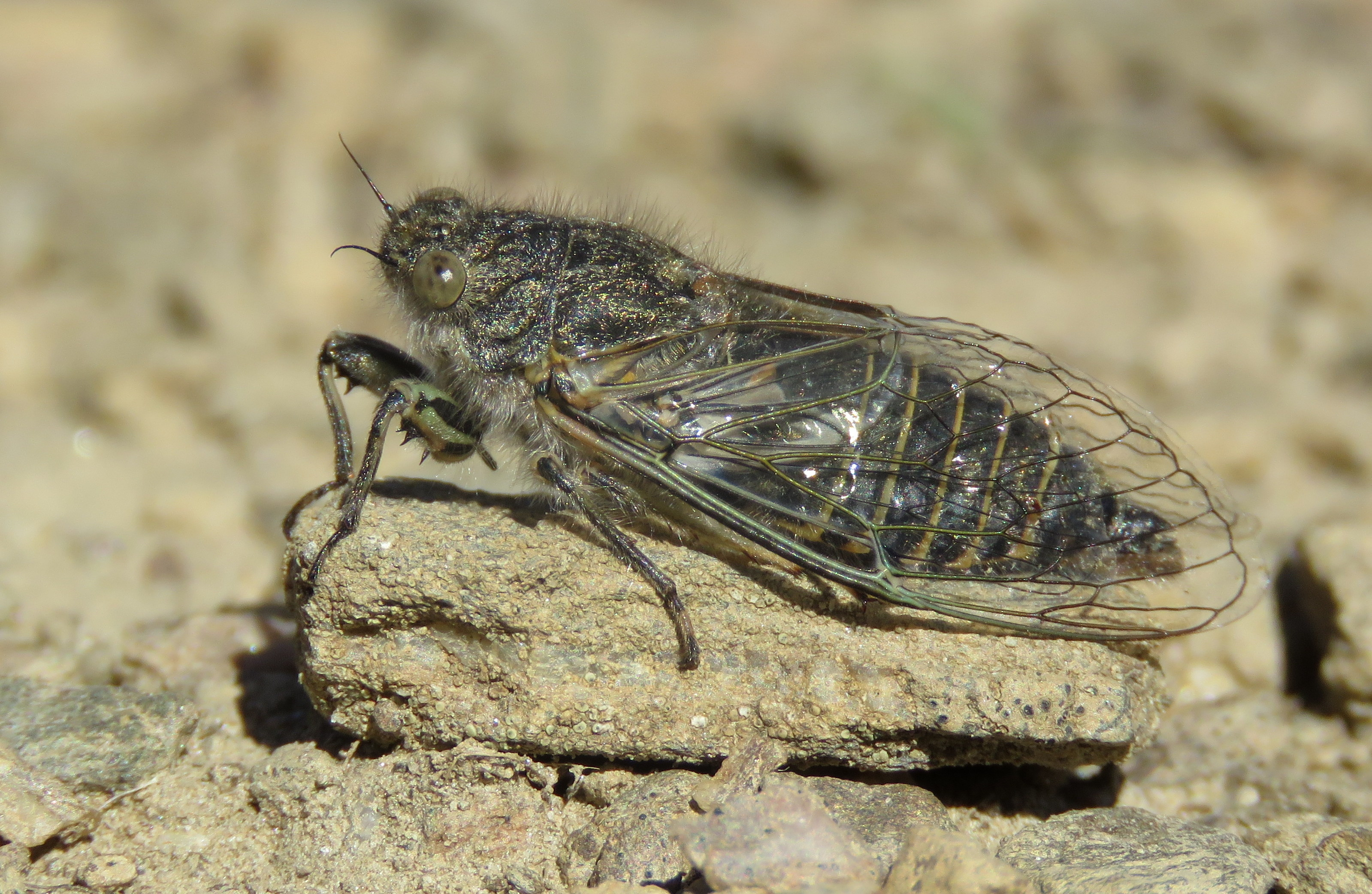
Maoricicada otagoensis otagoensis male singing from small stone on bare ground near Duffers Saddle, Central Otago.
