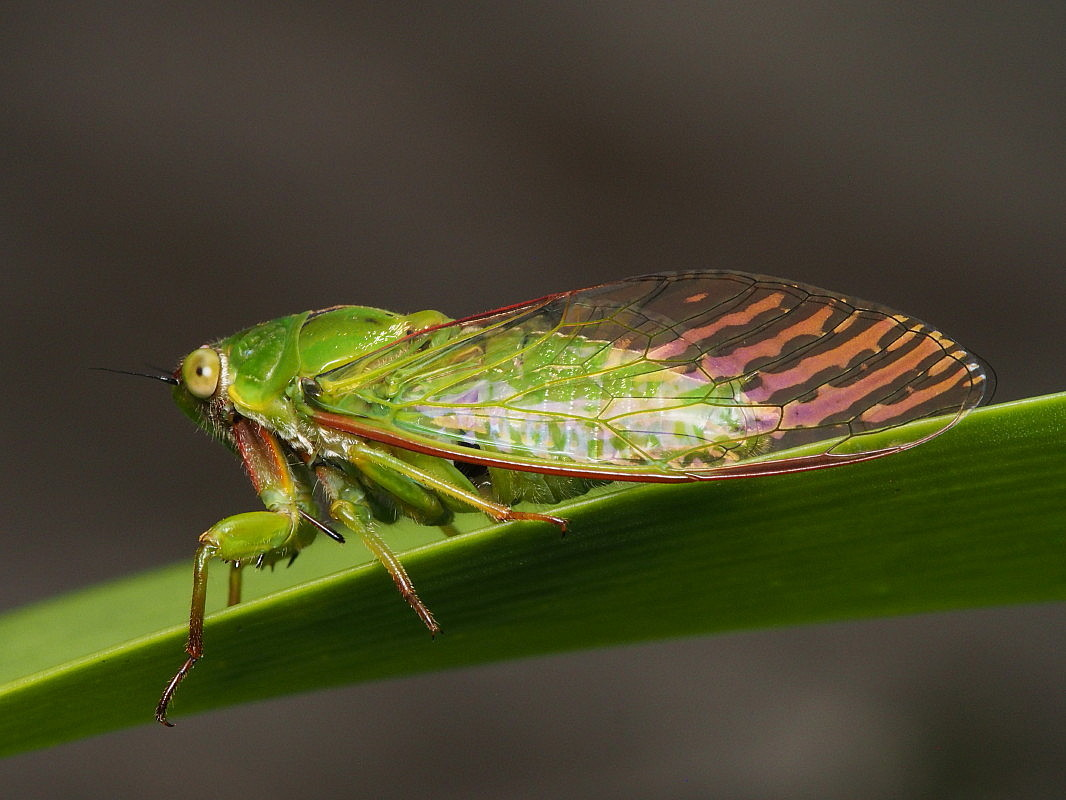

Scientific classification
- Kingdom: Animalia
- Phylum: Arthropoda
- Clade: Pancrustacea
- Class: Insecta
- Order: Hemiptera
- Suborder: Auchenorrhyncha
- Family: Cicadidae
- Genus: Kikihia
- Species: K. cutora

Binomial name
- Kikihia cutora (Walker, 1850)

Synonyms
- Cicada cutora Walker, 1850

= Kikihia cutora =

Species of true bug

Kikihia cutora, the snoring cicada, is a species of cicada that is endemic to New Zealand. This species was first described by Francis Walker in 1850.

== Subspecies ==
There are three subspecies:

- Kikihia cutora cumberi Fleming, 1973 (Southern Snoring Cicada)

North Island, south from Coromandel and lower Waikato Valley to the southern tip of the North Island. Seldom observed before Christmas. Late January to late May with a maximum in March–April.(Fleming, 1973)

- Kikihia cutora cutora (Walker, 1850) (Northern Snoring Cicada)

northern North Island from Hauraki Plains, lower Waikato Valley and the Coromandel Peninsula northwards; scrub and vines. Populations on Coromandel Peninsula south to Te Aroha include individuals inseparable from K. c. cutora and others like K. c. cumberi so must be considered intermediate. The boundary between K. c. cutora and K. c. cumberi is ill-defined extending from Cape Colville to Tongaparutu River mouth. Recorded every month of the year but rarely in August through June.(Walker, 1950)

- Kikihia cutora exulis (Hudson, 1950) (Kermadec Cicada or Kermadec Snoring Cicada)

Raoul Island, Kermadec Islands, coastal forest on shrubs and trees including Myoporum. Not reported yet from the other islands of the group. September through March.(Hudson, 1950)

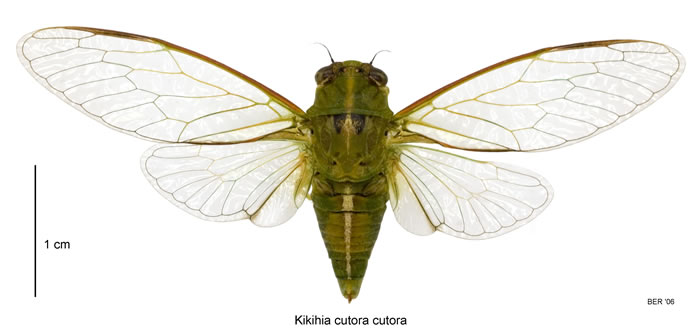
K. c. cutora
