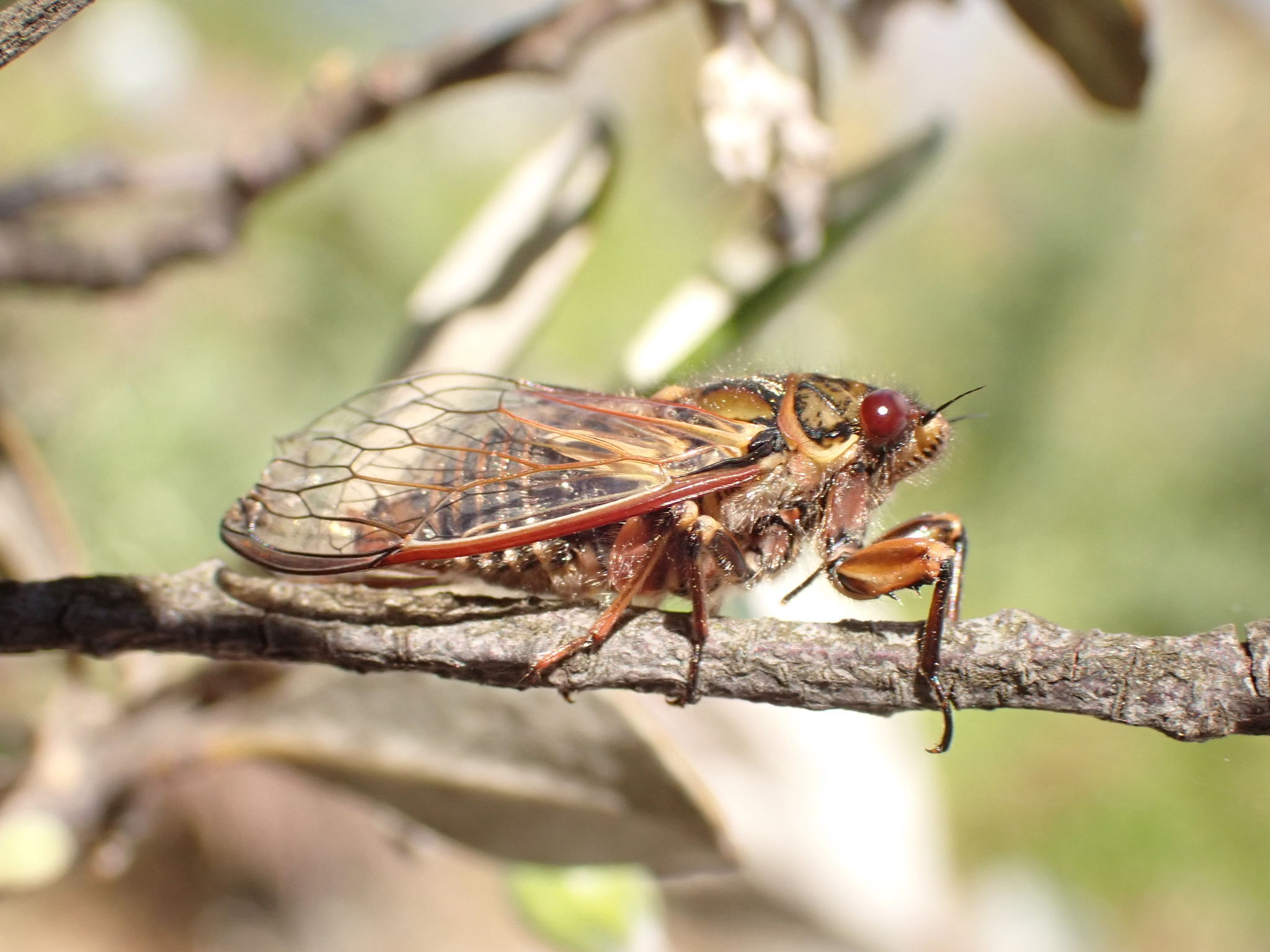

Scientific classification
- Kingdom: Animalia
- Phylum: Arthropoda
- Clade: Pancrustacea
- Class: Insecta
- Order: Hemiptera
- Suborder: Auchenorrhyncha
- Family: Cicadidae
- Genus: Kikihia
- Species: K. rosea

Binomial name
- Kikihia rosea (Walker, 1850)

Synonyms
- Cicada rosea Walker, 1850

= Kikihia rosea =

Species of true bug

Kikihia rosea, commonly known as the pink or Murihiku cicada, is a species of insect that is endemic to New Zealand. This species was first described by Francis Walker in 1850.
