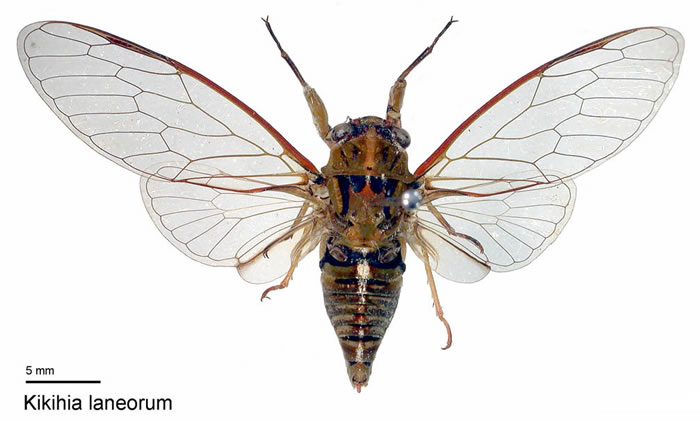

Scientific classification
- Kingdom: Animalia
- Phylum: Arthropoda
- Clade: Pancrustacea
- Class: Insecta
- Order: Hemiptera
- Suborder: Auchenorrhyncha
- Family: Cicadidae
- Genus: Kikihia
- Species: K. laneorum

Binomial name
- Kikihia laneorum Fleming, 1984

= Kikihia laneorum =

Species of true bug

Kikihia laneorum, commonly known as Lane's cicada, is a species of cicada that is endemic to New Zealand. This species was first described by Charles Fleming in 1984. It is named in honour of John and David Lane who discovered this species.
