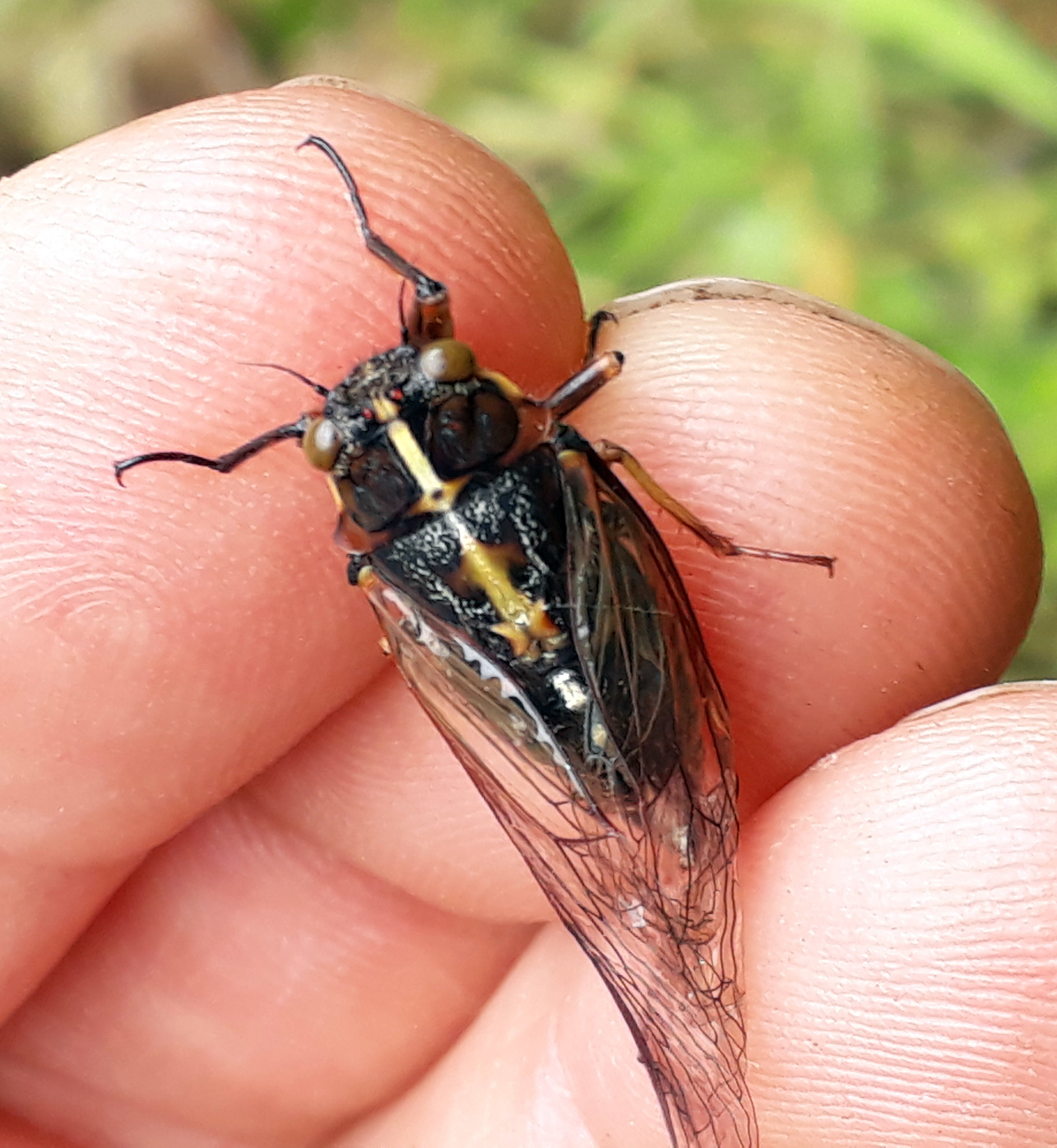

Conservation status
- Naturally Uncommon (NZ TCS)

Scientific classification
- Kingdom: Animalia
- Phylum: Arthropoda
- Clade: Pancrustacea
- Class: Insecta
- Order: Hemiptera
- Suborder: Auchenorrhyncha
- Family: Cicadidae
- Genus: Kikihia
- Species: K. longula

Binomial name
- Kikihia longula (Hudson, 1950)

Synonyms
- Melampsalta muta longula Hudson, 1950

= Kikihia longula =

Species of true bug

Kikihia longula, commonly known as the Chatham Island cicada, is a species of cicada that is endemic to New Zealand. This species was first described by George Hudson in 1950. Under the New Zealand Threat Classification System, this species is listed as "Naturally Uncommon" with the qualifiers of "Island Endemic".
