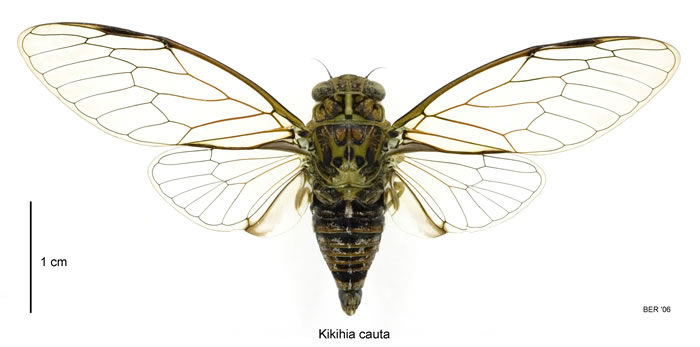

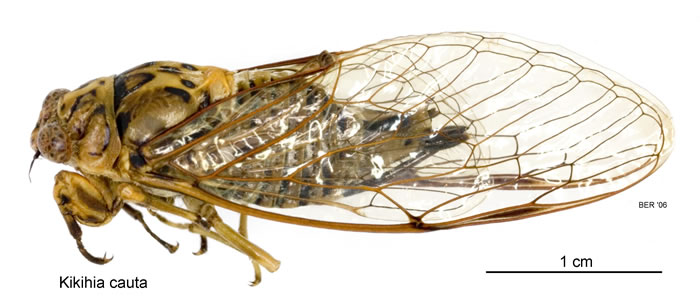

Scientific classification
- Kingdom: Animalia
- Phylum: Arthropoda
- Clade: Pancrustacea
- Class: Insecta
- Order: Hemiptera
- Suborder: Auchenorrhyncha
- Family: Cicadidae
- Genus: Kikihia
- Species: K. cauta

Binomial name
- Kikihia cauta (Myers, 1921)

Synonyms
- Melampsalta cauta Myers, 1921

= Kikihia cauta =

Species of true bug

Kikihia cauta, the greater bronze cicada, is a species of cicada that is endemic to New Zealand. This species was first described by J. G. Myers in 1921.
