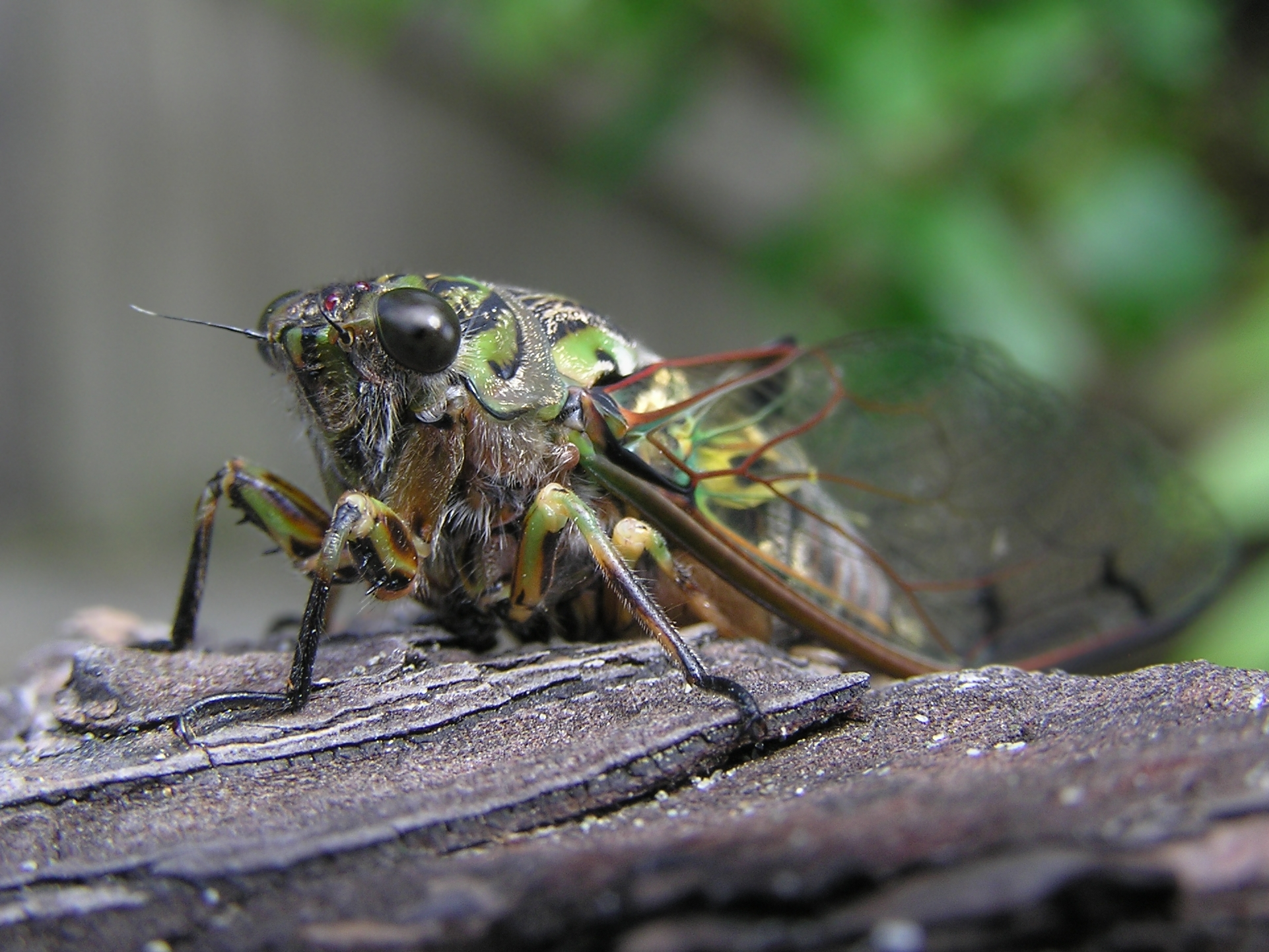
- A chorus cicada, Amphipsalta zelandica

Scientific classification
- Kingdom: Animalia
- Phylum: Arthropoda
- Clade: Pancrustacea
- Class: Insecta
- Order: Hemiptera
- Suborder: Auchenorrhyncha
- Family: Cicadidae
- Genus: Amphipsalta
- Species: A. zelandica

Binomial name
- Amphipsalta zelandica (Boisduval, 1835)

Synonyms
- Cicada zelandica Boisduval, 1835; Cicada zealandica Walker, 1850; Cicada zeylandica Walker, 1858; Cicadetta zealandica Kirkaldy, 1909; Melampsalta zelandica; Amphipsalta zealandica

Audio
- Song of the chorus cicada

= Amphipsalta zelandica =

Species of true bug

The chorus cicada, Amphipsalta zelandica, is the most common species of cicada in New Zealand, where it is endemic and found in most areas. They typically live in forests and areas with open bush, where their left-over nymph skins can be seen on tree trunks and branches during the summer months. The males produce their cicada sound in unison, which can reach deafening proportions at the height of their population around February. Groups of cicada can suddenly transition from the typical cicada sound to synchronised clicks, using their wings to clap against the surface they are sitting on.

== Description ==
Chorus cicada have a nymph stage before their last molt and become an adult. During this nymph stage they are a soft and creamy white, and very similar looking to the adult form (but without wings). Adults are usually larger than 2 cm in length while the largest species are up to 4 cm; this includes the wings. Chorus cicadas’ wings only appear after molting to become adults, they are membranous with veins, filter out ultraviolet light, and the wing span is about 6 cm.

The colour of the chorus cicada can be black/green/brown and many have stripes along their body. The antenna of the chorus cicada has seven segments with the seventh being constricted medially, which means the last segment is tightened towards the middle. The adult male cicadas differ from the females by the presence of a clasper sheath, and females do not have the finger-like extensions that the males have.

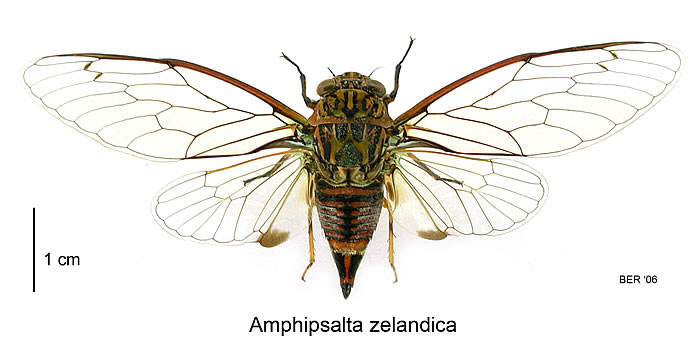
Amphipsalta zelandica

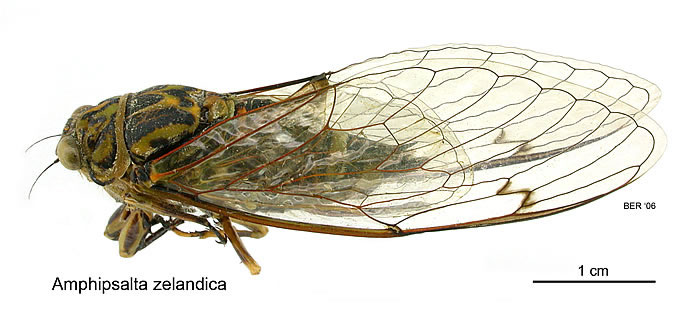

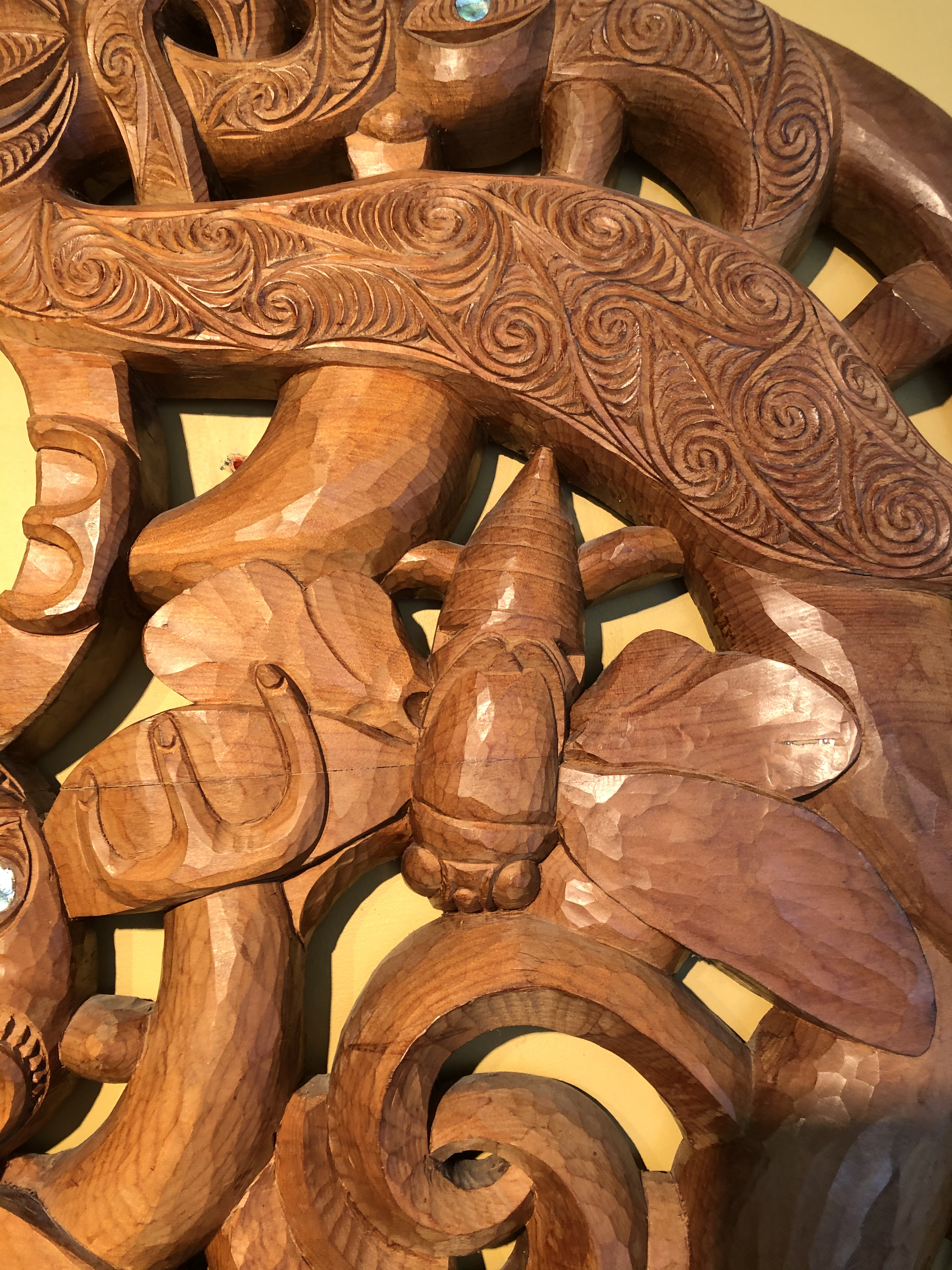
Chorus cicada carved on pare on display at the New Zealand Arthropod Collection at Landcare Research, Auckland.

The song made by cicadas is the loudest noise made by any insect. Male chorus cicadas produce a communication song that is specific to their species, and so species can be identified by their song. A pulse group of their song is made up of five clicks where the central click (third click) is stronger than the two on either side of it. The central click can become two clicks if the cicada is tired and has no energy. These clicks are made by the cicada hitting its wings against the surface it is sitting on. These pulse groups can be produced quickly and continuously in a prolonged note during chorus singing. Chorus cicadas are New Zealand's largest cicadas, with size averaging 40 mm.

== Diet and foraging ==
The adults and immatures of the chorus cicada both feed on xylem sap made from plants. This sap is low in nutrients and doesn't contain all the necessary amino acids, so to make up for this the insects rely on an endosymbiotic bacteria to provide the lacking nutrients from the sap. This type of food makes the chorus cicada a generalist feeder as it has a range of host plants that it feeds on. An orchard root system provides a good food source for the nymphs which live in the soil.

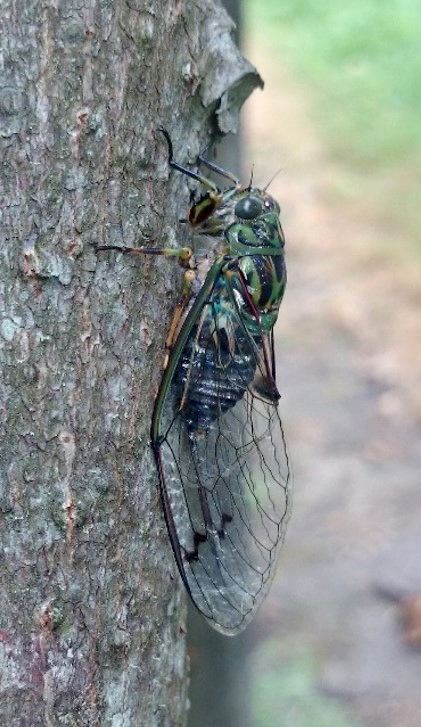
Adult chorus cicada.

== Distribution ==
=== Natural global range ===
Chorus cicadas are endemic insects to New Zealand. The most closely related species are found in Australia, New Caledonia and Norfolk Island. However, some studies about the New Zealand fauna show that the fauna of New Zealand was from several invasions across the Tasman Sea from Australia or New Caledonia.

=== New Zealand range ===
Chorus cicadas are often found in towns and cities. They are distributed throughout the whole country, common in the North Island, some coastal areas of the South Island, central Otago and parts of Canterbury.

=== Habitat preferences ===
Chorus cicadas are commonly found in open forests and woodlands but also sometimes found on buildings, fences or lamp posts. Cicadas prefer sub-tropical, sub-humid and temperate environments.

== Cultural uses ==
The Māori name for cicadas is kihikihi wawa, matua kihikihi or ngengeti. One Māori haka and folk song, Te Tarakihi (the cicada) is based on the shrill summer-singing of the cicada.

== Life cycle/phenology ==
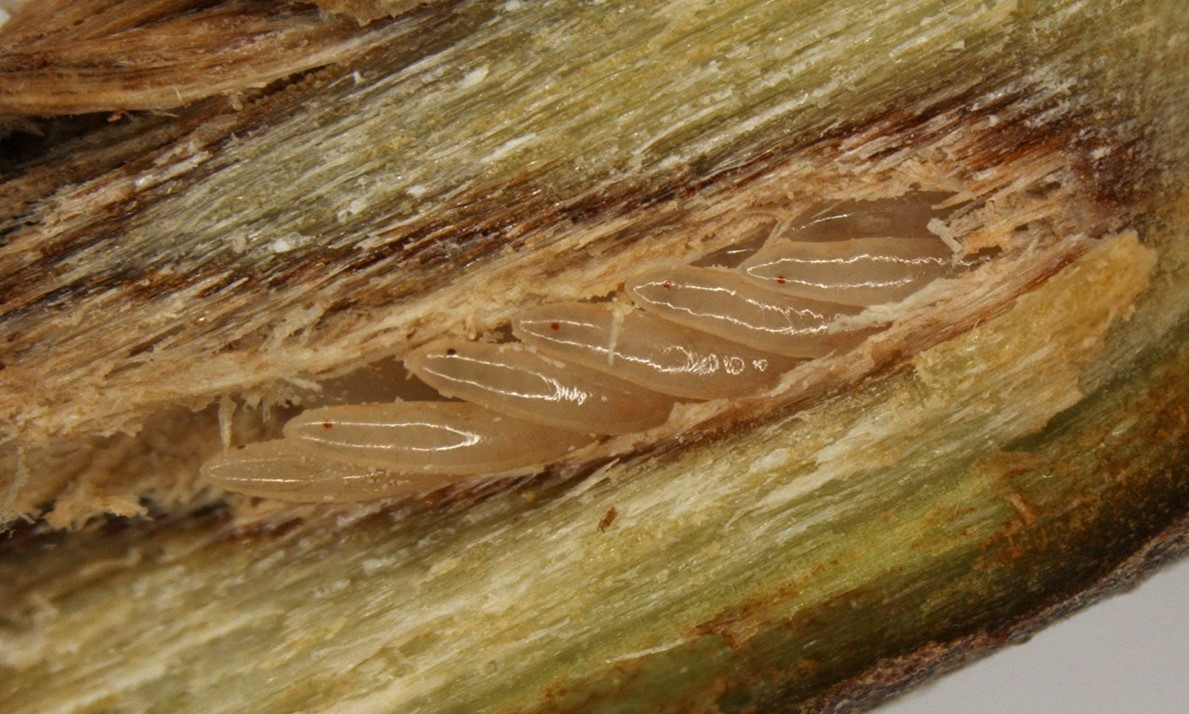
Chorus cicada eggs laid in a kiwifruit cane.

Mating is triggered by the song of the males, which facilitates the gathering of many males and females. Males compete with each other to produce the loudest and best musical sound, and sing louder when the weather is warmer. Sometimes two cicadas will fight each other. Chorus cicadas usually mate on a tree trunk silently. Adult cicada have a short life span of only two to three weeks, because after mating the adult cicada die off. Female chorus cicadas lay their eggs into thin branches of a wide range of plants. Females lay from 5 to 700 eggs, each about the size of a grain of rice. They lay eggs in a herring-bone pattern in the thin tree branches.

The eggs take 3 to 10 months to develop and hatch. Hatching occurs from May to mid-December. After hatching the larvae burrow into the ground where they grow and develop their organs and increase in size. This process and the transformation into nymphs occurs during the springs and winter months. During this period the nymphs feed on the juices of roots and other underground organisms. The nymph stage of the cicada can last from 25 to 44 months.

Once the nymphs have grown to their maximum size they emerge from the ground and climb up tree trunks to moult. This is the transformation that turns the nymphs to adult cicada. This occurs on summer nights during the period of mid-December to late February. Once out of their last nymph skin, their wings expand, and they wait for them to harden before they can fly off.

== Predators, parasites, and diseases ==
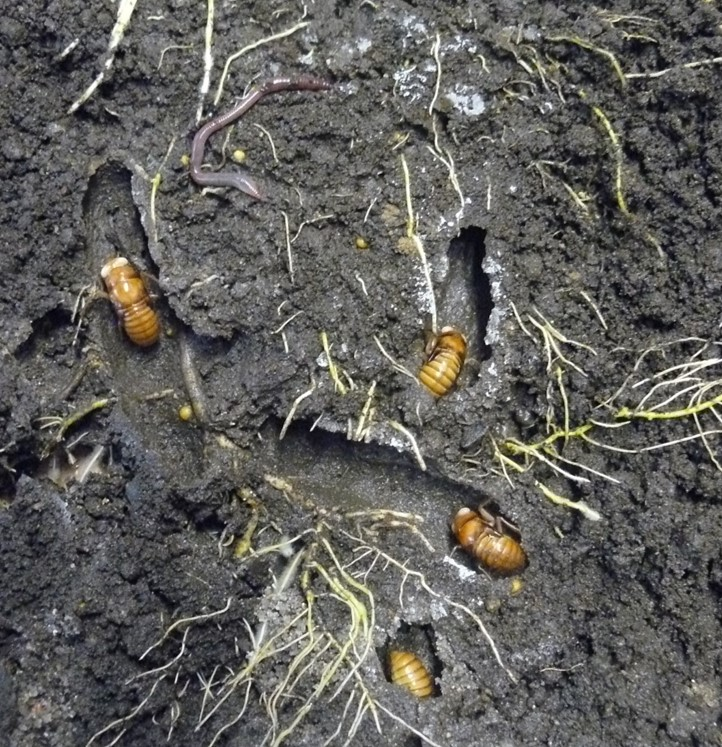
Final instar chorus cicada nymphs in soil.

The chorus cicada has a number of predators but few known parasites. In the adult stage, cicada are killed by wasps (such as the Vespula vulgaris), birds, spiders and fungal diseases. In the nymph stage, beetles and fungal diseases can kill cicada. Parasitic wasps lay eggs into the cicada's eggs.

Isaria sinclairii is a species of entomopathogenic fungus which can infect the underground nymphs of chorus cicadas.

Sound made when handled
