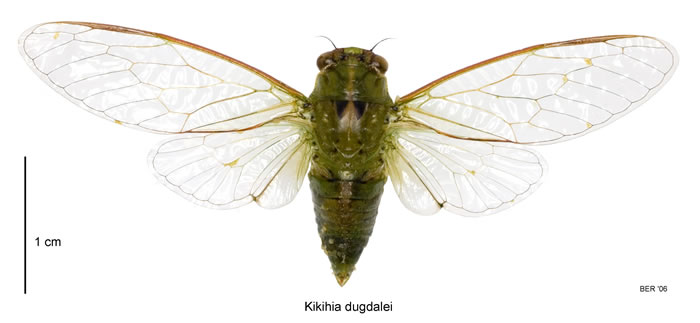

Scientific classification
- Kingdom: Animalia
- Phylum: Arthropoda
- Clade: Pancrustacea
- Class: Insecta
- Order: Hemiptera
- Suborder: Auchenorrhyncha
- Family: Cicadidae
- Genus: Kikihia
- Species: K. dugdalei

Binomial name
- Kikihia dugdalei Fleming, 1984

= Kikihia dugdalei =

Species of cicada insect

Kikihia dugdalei, commonly known as Dugdale's cicada, is a species of cicada that is endemic to New Zealand. This species was first described by Charles Fleming in 1984. It was named in honour of John S. Dugdale.
