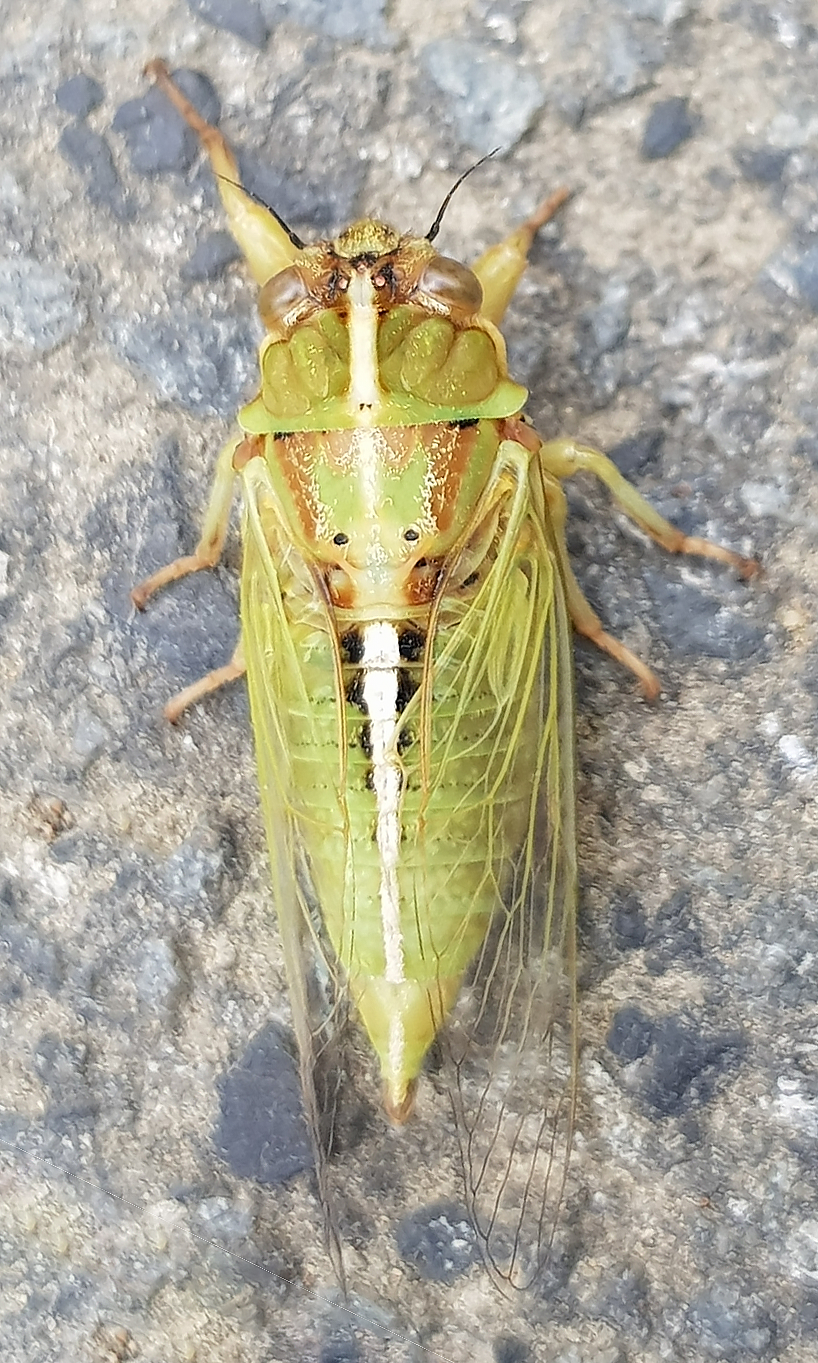

Scientific classification
- Kingdom: Animalia
- Phylum: Arthropoda
- Clade: Pancrustacea
- Class: Insecta
- Order: Hemiptera
- Suborder: Auchenorrhyncha
- Family: Cicadidae
- Genus: Kikihia
- Species: K. muta

Binomial name
- Kikihia muta (Fabricius, 1775)

Synonyms
- Tettigonia muta Fabricius, 1775

= Kikihia muta =

Species of true bug

Kikihia muta, commonly known as the variable cicada, is a species of cicada that is endemic to New Zealand. This species was first described by Johan Christian Fabricius in 1775.

== Life Cycle ==
Their median life cycle from egg to natural adult death is around three years.

== Subspecies ==
There are two subspecies:

- Kikihia muta muta (Fabricius, 1775)
- Kikihia muta pallida (Hudson, 1950)
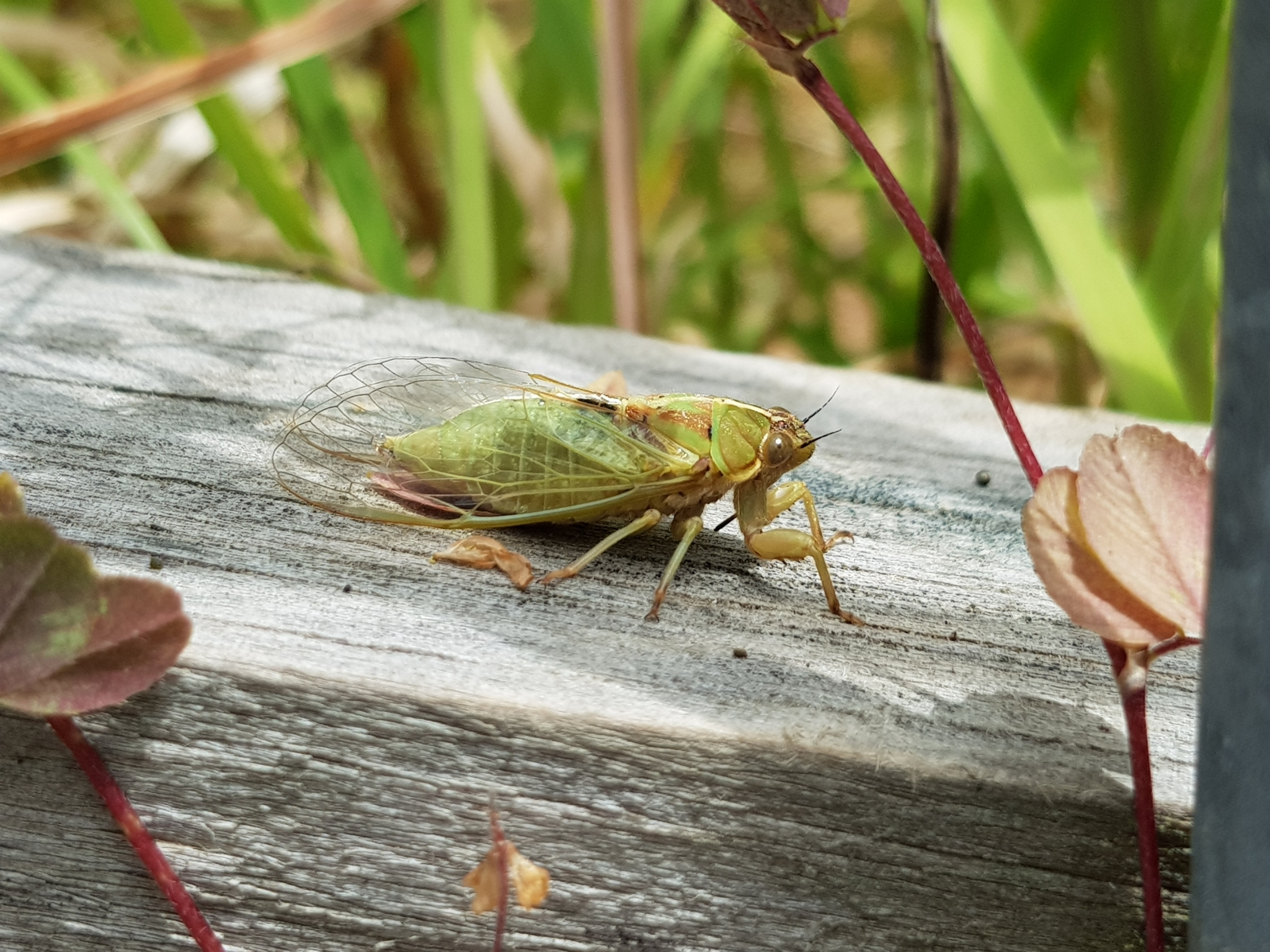
Lateral view

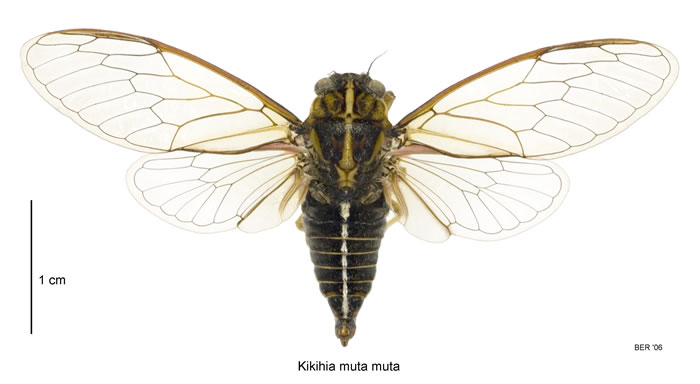
Dorsal view
