= Euan Mason =

New Zealand forestry academic

Euan G. Mason (born c.1953 ) is a Professor at the School of Forestry in the University of Canterbury in Christchurch, New Zealand.

== Biography ==
Mason was born in Invercargill, New Zealand but raised in Lower Hutt and Geneva before moving on to New Jersey. His hobbies include astronomy, music, computer programming and football. Mason completed a PhD at the University of Canterbury in 1992.

His main research areas include silviculture, growth and yield modelling, hybrid modelling and decision-support (applied artificial intelligence). He is skilled in the field of dendrology, the identification of tree species. He was editor of the New Zealand Journal of Forestry from 2006.

== Selected works ==
- Mason, E. G.; Milne, P. G. (1999). "Effects of weed control, fertilization, and soil cultivation on the growth of Pinus radiata at midrotation in Canterbury, New Zealand". Canadian Journal of Forest Research. 29 (7): 985–992. doi:10.1139/x99-087.
- Mason, E. G.; Kirongo, B. (1999). "Responses of radiata pine clones to varying levels of pasture competition in a semiarid environment". Canadian Journal of Forest Research. 29 (7): 934–939. doi:10.1139/x99-113.
- Mason, E.G. 2000. 'Evaluation of a model of beech forest growing on the West Coast of the South Island of New Zealand'. New Zealand Journal of Forestry, 44 (4): 26–31.
- Mason, E.G. 2001. 'A model of the juvenile growth and survival of Pinus radiata D. Don: Adding the effects of initial seedling diameter and plant handling'. New Forests, 22: 133–158
- Lassere, J., Mason, E.G, & Watt, M.S. 2004. 'The influence of initial stocking on corewood stiffness in a clonal experiment of 11-year-old Pinus radiata D.Don'. New Zealand Journal of Forestry, 44 (3), 18–23.
- Mason, Euan G. (2004). "Effects of soil cultivation, fertilisation, initial seedling diameter and plant handling on the development of maturing Pinus radiata D. Don on Kaingaroa gravelly sand in the Central North Island of New Zealand". Bosque (Valdivia). 25 (2). doi:10.4067/S0717-92002004000200005.
- Lasserre, Jean-Pierre; Mason, Euan G.; Watt, Michael S. (2005). "The effects of genotype and spacing on Pinus radiata [D. Don] corewood stiffness in an 11-year-old experiment". Forest Ecology and Management. 205 (1–3): 375–383. doi:10.1016/j.foreco.2004.10.037.
- Richardson, Brian; Watt, Michael S.; Mason, Euan G.; Kriticos, Darren J. (2006). "Advances in modelling and decision support systems for vegetation management in young forest plantations". Forestry: An International Journal of Forest Research. 79: 29–42. doi:10.1093/forestry/cpi059.
- Mason, Euan G. (2006). "Interactions between influences of genotype and grass competition on growth and wood stiffness of juvenile radiata pine in a summer-dry environment". Canadian Journal of Forest Research. 36 (10): 2454–2463. doi:10.1139/x06-098.
- Pinjuv, Guy; Mason, Euan G.; Watt, Mike (2006). "Quantitative validation and comparison of a range of forest growth model types". Forest Ecology and Management. 236: 37–46. doi:10.1016/j.foreco.2006.06.025.
- Mason, Euan G.; Dzierzon, Helge (2006). "Applications of modeling to vegetation management". Canadian Journal of Forest Research. 36 (10): 2505–2514. doi:10.1139/x06-191.
- Dzierzon, Helge; Mason, Euan G. (2006). "Towards a nationwide growth and yield model for radiata pine plantations in New Zealand". Canadian Journal of Forest Research. 36 (10): 2533–2543. doi:10.1139/x06-214.
- Bown, H. E.; Watt, M. S.; Clinton, P. W.; Mason, E. G.; Richardson, B. (2007). "Partititioning concurrent influences of nitrogen and phosphorus supply on photosynthetic model parameters of Pinus radiata". Tree Physiology. 27 (3): 335–344. doi:10.1093/treephys/27.3.335. PMID 17241975.
- Lasserre, Jean-Pierre; Mason, Euan G.; Watt, Michael S. (2007). "Assessing corewood acoustic velocity and modulus of elasticity with two impact based instruments in 11-year-old trees from a clonal-spacing experiment of Pinus radiata D. Don". Forest Ecology and Management. 239 (1–3): 217–221. doi:10.1016/j.foreco.2006.12.009.
- Waghorn, M.J., Mason, E.G., & Watt, M.S. 2007. 'Assessing interactions between initial stand stocking and genotype on growth and form of 17-year-old Pinus radiata in Canterbury, New Zealand Journal of Forestry, 52 (1).
