= Forests Act =

Forests Act may refer to:

- Forests Act 1949 in New Zealand
- Indian Forest Act, 1927

== See also ==
- National Forest Act (disambiguation)
