= Forestry in New Zealand =

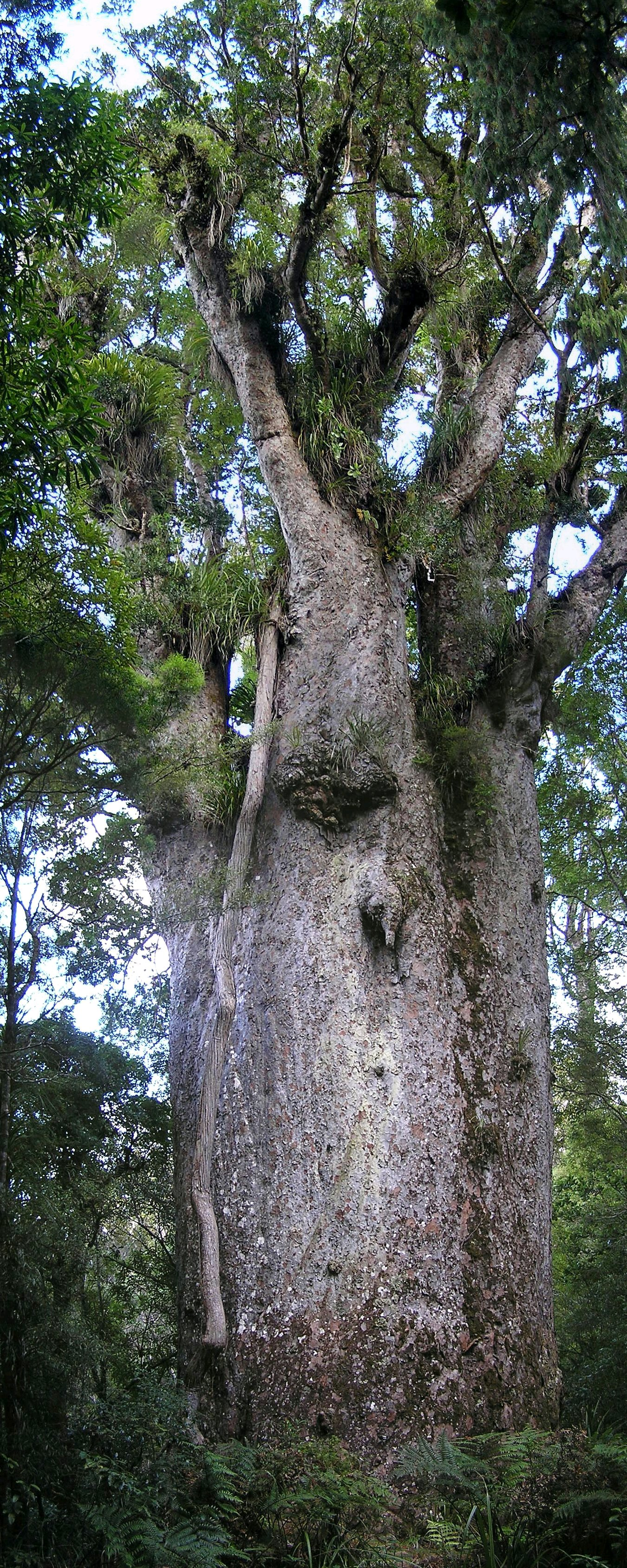
Kauri (Agathis australis) was extensively logged for its desirable timber. This surviving tree is called 'Te Matua Ngahere'.

Forestry in New Zealand has a history starting with European settlement in the 19th century and is now an industry worth seven percent of annual revenue. Much of the original native forest cover was burnt off and logged, however forests have been extensively planted, predominantly with fast-growing cultivars of the Monterey pine. Wood chips, whole logs, lumber and paper products are exported from New Zealand.

Deforestation in New Zealand on public land attracted opposition with protests and environmental groups becoming very active. Since 2000, logging of forests is only permitted if it is shown to be sustainable.

== History ==
Milling of New Zealand's extensive native forests was one of the earliest industries in the European settlement of the country. The long, straight hardwood from the kauri was ideal for ship masts and spars. As the new colony was established, timber was the most common building material, and vast areas of native forest were cleared. Rimu, tōtara, mataī, and miro were the favoured timbers.

The Monterey pine (Pinus radiata) was introduced to New Zealand in the 1850s. It thrived in the conditions, reaching maturity in 28 years, much faster than in its native California. It was found to grow well in the infertile acidic soil of the volcanic plateau, where attempts for agriculture had failed. Thomas William Adams experimented with P. radiata and other trees in Canterbury from the 1870s, and promoted the early forestry industry. The Government initiated planting of exotic forests in 1899 at Whakarewarewa, near Rotorua. This was to address growing timber shortages as slow-growing native forests were exhausted.

From 1901, prison plantations were operated at Whakarewarewa, Kāingaroa, Waiotapu, Waipā, Hanmer and Dumgree. By 1920, prisoners had planted 40 million trees across nearly 16,000 acres.

In the 1930s, vast areas of land were planted in Pinus radiata by relief workers. The largest tract was the 188,000-hectare Kāingaroa forest, the largest plantation forest in the world. As the major forests matured, processing industries such as the Kinleith Mill at Tokoroa and the Tasman Mill at Kawerau were established.

== Plantation forests ==
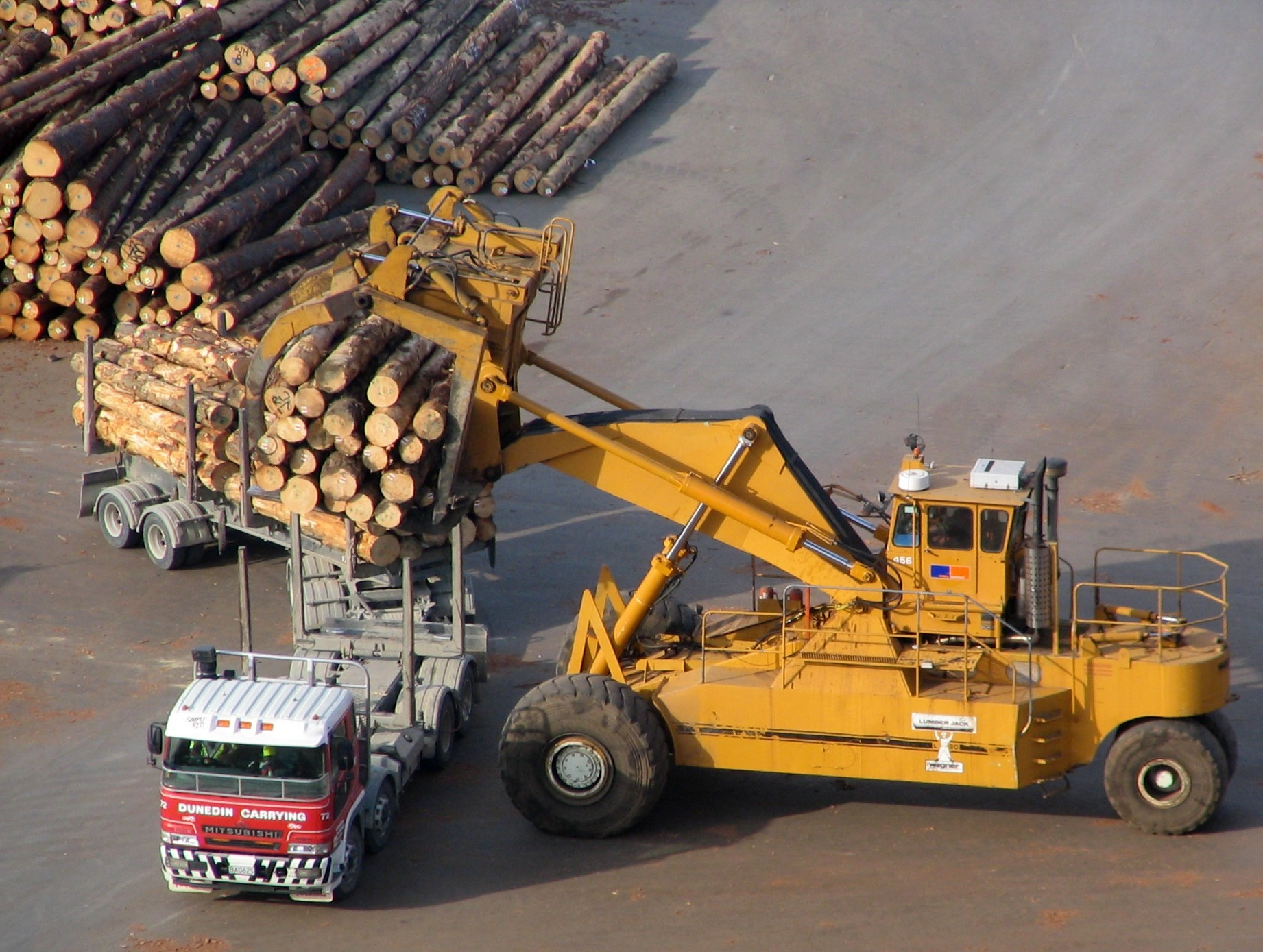
A logging truck being unloaded at Port Chalmers

Plantation forests of various sizes can now be found in all regions of New Zealand except Central Otago and Fiordland. In 2006 their total area was 1.8 million hectares, with 89% in Pinus radiata and 5% in Douglas fir (Pseudotsuga menziesii) Log harvesting in 2006 was 18.8 million m^{3}, down from 22.5 million m^{3} in 2003. This is projected to rise as high as 30 million m^{3} as newer forests mature. The value of all forestry exports (logs, chips, sawn timber, panels and paper products) for the year ended 31 March 2006 was $NZ 3.62 billion, rising to $NZ 5 billion in 2018. Australia accounts for just over 25% of export value, mostly paper products, followed by Japan, South Korea, China and the United States. In 2018, wood products were New Zealand's third-biggest export (dairy products and meat were the larger), and forestry accounted for approximately 3% of national GDP, directly employing 20,000 people. On the global stage, the New Zealand forestry industry is a relatively small contributor in terms of production, accounting for 1% of global wood supply for industrial purposes.

== Deaths ==
Figures from WorkSafe New Zealand show that forestry is the most dangerous job in New Zealand, with 56.73 fatalities per 100,000 workers.

== Woodchipping ==
Softwood and hardwood wood chips are exported from New Zealand.

== Opposition to native forest logging ==
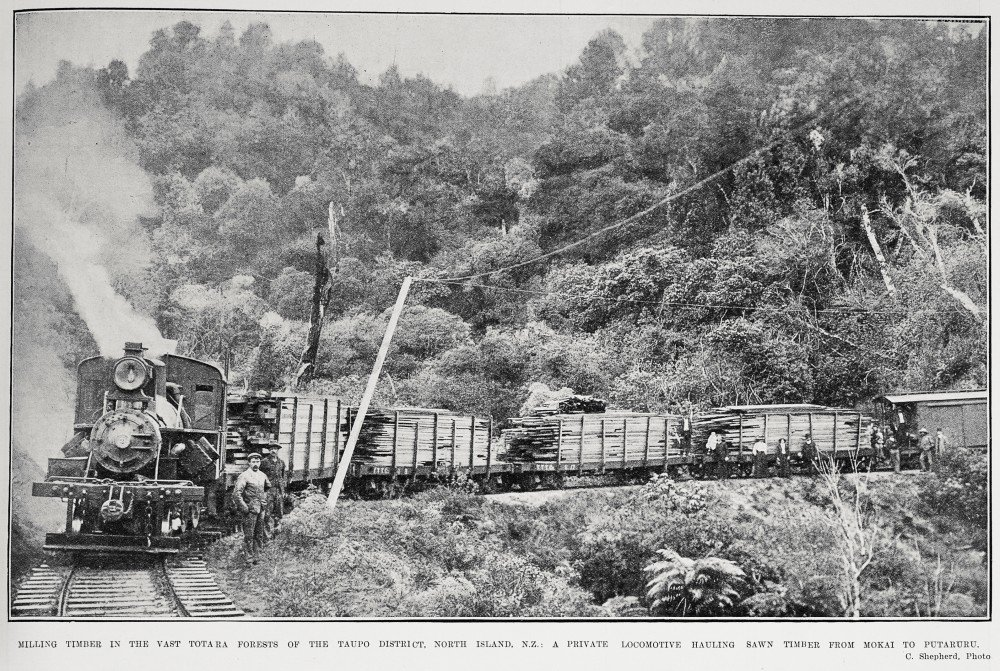
Totara timber industry Taupo District, NZ (1910)

== Legislation ==
- Forests Act 1949
- Forests Amendment Act 1993

== See also ==
- Conservation in New Zealand
- Kauri Museum
- Ministry of Agriculture and Forestry (New Zealand)
- New Zealand Arboricultural Association
- New Zealand Forest Service
- New Zealand Journal of Forestry
- Timberlands West Coast Limited
