= Forecast =

Forecast or derived words may refer to:

== Prediction and models ==
- Forecasting, the process of making statements about events which have not yet been observed
  - Forecast error
  - Forecast skill
- Weather forecasting, the application of science and technology to predict the weather
- FORECAST (model), system for managing ecosystems and forest growth
- Forecast period (finance)

== Music ==
- The Forecast, an indie rock band from Peoria, Illinois

=== Albums ===
- Forecast (album), a 1993 album by 808 State
- Forecast: Tomorrow, a 2006 compilation album by the jazz group Weather Report
- The Forecast (album), the debut album and third release by Australian band In Fiction

=== Songs ===
- "Forecast (Intro)", a song by Amerie from Because I Love It
- "Forecast" (song), a song by Jeff Lynne

== Other uses ==
- Mount Forecast
- Tommy Forecast (born 1986), English professional footballer

== See also ==
- Forecast model (disambiguation)
- Foresight (disambiguation)
- The Forecaster, a regional newspaper in southern Maine
- The Forecaster, a 2014 documentary about Martin A. Armstrong
