= Forest growth models of Canada =

Forest growth models are mathematical or computer models to project the future state and yields of forest stands or forest trees, over a time scale of from a few years to many decades.

Structure and function of growth models vary: some are purely empirical, based on the reproduction of past observations, while others explicitly mimic specific processes relative to tree ecophysiology, stand dynamics, etc. Typically, growth models use forest inventory data and site characteristics, such as soil type, drainage class, average annual temperature, precipitation, etc., as input for growth projections. Most models are calibrated for a given region and a given set of stand types, defined by the species composition and the management regime (even-aged versus uneven-aged stands, managed versus unmanaged stands).

Some models consider only stand growth and dynamics processes, while other can simulate the effect of silviculture practices (plantation, partial harvest, fertilization, etc.).

== Typology of models ==
=== Model types ===
==== Scale/resolution ====
- Whole stand model:
- Stand table model:
- Tree list model:

==== Construction ====
"Empirical models seek principally to describe the statistical relationships among data with limited regard to an object's internal structure, rules, or behaviour. In contrast, process models seek primarily to describe data using key mechanisms or processes that determine an object's internal structure, rules, and behaviour."

Models can be either distance-independent or distance-dependent. In the later case, geographical positions of trees are known and used for modeling competition and/or dispersion processes.

=== Forest Region ===
- refers to Forest Regions of Canada

=== Species ===
1. Eastern SPF: Balsam fir, black, red and white spruce, jack pine
2. Western SPF: Spruce-Pine-Fir
3. Other western softwoods: Western Red cedar, western hemlock
4. Other eastern softwood: white and red pines, eastern white cedar
5. Tolerant hardwoods: Maples, yellow birch, Beech, Oaks,
6. Boreal hardwoods: Aspen, white birch

=== Regime ===
- Even-aged Vs. uneven-aged

=== Silviculture ===
- Unmanaged Vs. managed stands (plantation, tending, thinning, fertilization, recurrent partial cuttings, etc.)

=== Yields ===
Growth model outputs can fall in the following categories:

1. Tree attributes: species, diameter at breast height, taper, vigour index, quality grade, crown dimensions, etc.
2. Stand attributes: living tree density, dead tree density, mean diameter at breast height, dominant height, basal area, crown closure, etc.
3. Biomass production: biomass or volume per compartment (bole, branches, leafs, roots), carbon storage, etc.
4. Ecophysiologial indicators: respiration, net productivity, water consumption, heat transfer, etc.
5. Lumber and fiber products: merchantable volume, lumber volume per grade, pulp volume, wood quality indicators (MOE, MOR,...), etc.
6. Ecological indicators: volume of large woody debris, snag density, species diversity index, etc.
7. Economic indicators: net value of standing trees, net present value (NPV), cash flow, land expectation value, etc.

=== Climate input ===
- Identifies models that consider climate variables as input (temperature, precipitations, etc.)

=== Regeneration ===
- Identifies models that make projections on natural regeneration (establishment, early growth and survival, or tree recruitment to the merchantable stand).

== Catalog ==
Please refer to the lexicon for the definitions of the variables and the categories used in this table.

Model Name	Type	Province	Forest Region	Species	Regime	Silviculture	Yields	Climate inputs	Regeneration	References and Notes
Plonski's normal yield tables	Stand yield model	Ontario	Boreal, Great Lakes-St.Lawrence	Eastern SPF, Tolerant hardwoods, Other Eastern softwoods	Even-aged	Unmanaged, Plantation	2, 5	No	No	Plonski, W.L. 1974 Normal yield tables (metric) for major forest tree species of Ontario. Ontario Ministry of Natural Resources. 40p.
Vezina & Linteau's normal yield tables	Stand yield model	Quebec	Boreal, Great Lakes-St.Lawrence	Eastern SPF	Even-aged	Unmanaged stands	2, 5	No	No	Vezina, P.E. and Linteau, A. 1968. Growth and yield of balsam fir and black spruce in Quebec. Department of Forestry and rural development, Forest Research Laboratory, Quebec Region, Information Report Q-X-2, 58p.
Boudoux's empirical yield tables	Stand yield model	Quebec	Boreal, Great Lakes-St.Lawrence	Eastern SPF	Even-aged	Unmanaged stands	2, 5	No	No	Boudoux, M. 1978. Tables de rendement empiriques pour l'épinette noire, le sapin baumier et le pin gris au Québec. Gouvernement du Québec, ministère des Terres et Forêts, COGEF, 101p.
Pothier & Savard's empirical yield tables	Stand yield model	Quebec	Boreal, Great Lakes-St.Lawrence	Eastern SPF, Boreal hardwoods, Other Eastern softwoods	Even-aged	Unmanaged stands	2, 5	No	No	Pothier, D. & Savard, F. 1998. Actualisation des tables de production pour les principales espèces forestières du Québec. Gouvernement du Québec, ministère des Ressources naturelles, Québec. 183 p.
Bolghari & Bertrand's empirical yield tables	Stand yield model	Quebec	Great Lakes-St.Lawrence	Eastern SPF, Other Eastern softwoods	Even-aged	Plantation	2, 5	No	No	
Artemis2009	Stand table model	Quebec	Boreal, Great Lakes-St.Lawrence	Eastern SPF, Other Eastern softwoods, Tolerant hardwoods, Boreal hardwoods	Even-aged and Uneven-aged	Unmanaged and managed stands	1, 2, 5	Yes	Yes	Fortin, M. & Langevin, L., 2010. ARTÉMIS-2009 : Ministère des Ressources naturelles et de la Faune, Direction de la recherche forestière. 48 p.
Natura2009	Stand yield model	Quebec	Boreal, Great Lakes-St.Lawrence	Species	Even-aged	Unmanaged	2, 5	Yes	No	Pothier, D.& Auger, I. 2011. NATURA-2009 : un modèle de prévision de la croissance à l'échelle du peuplement pour les forêts du Québec. Mémoire de recherche forestière n° 163. Ministère des Ressources naturelles et de la Faune, Direction de la recherche forestière. 56 p.
SaMARE	Stand table model	Quebec	Great Lakes-St.Lawrence	Tolerant hardwoods	Uneven-aged	Managed (selection system)	1, 2, 5	Yes	Yes	Fortin, M., Bédard, S. & Deblois, J., 2009. SaMARE : un modèle par tiges individuelles destiné à la prévision de la croissance des érablières de structure inéquienne du Québec méridional. Mémoire de recherche forestière n° 155. Ministère des Ressources naturelles et de la Faune, Direction de la recherche forestière. 44 p.
Zelig-CFS	Stand table model	Quebec	Great Lakes-St.Lawrence	Tolerant hardwoods, Other eastern softwoods	Uneven-aged	Managed	1, 2, 5	Yes	Yes	Larocque, G.R.; Archambault, L.; Delisle, C., 2011. Development of the gap model ZELIG-CFS to predict the dynamics of North American mixed forest types with complex structures. Ecol. Model. 222:2570-2583
FVS-Ontario	Stand table model	Ontario	Forest Region	Species	Even-aged and uneven-aged	Unmanaged	1, 2, 5			Lacerte, V. Forest vegetation simulator model calibration for Ontario (FVS Ontario). Natural Resources Canada Canadian Forest Service, Quebec. Information Report LAU-X-132. 91p. Natural Resources Canada Canadian Forest Service, Quebec. Information Report LAU-X-132. 91p.
CropPlanner	Type	Ontario	Boreal	Eastern SPF	Even-aged	Managed (Plantation, precommercial and commercial thinnings)		No	No	"A decision support system for forest density management within upland black spruce stand-types."
Staman	Stand table model	New Brunswick	Acadian Forests	Eastern SPF, Tolerant hardwoods	Even-aged and uneven-aged	Silviculture	1, 2, 5			"Calibration of the STAMAN stand growth model to produce yield curves for spaced tolerant hardwood stands in New Brunswick"
OSM	Tree list model	New Brunswick	Maine, Maritimes	Acadian Forests	Even-aged and uneven-aged	Unmanaged, Extensive & Intensively Managed	1, 2, 5			
Biolley	Stand table model	Quebec, Ontario	Great Lakes-St.Lawrence	Species	Uneven-aged	Managed	1, 2, 5, 6, 7	Yes	Yes	
SORTIE	Type	Quebec	Boreal, Great Lakes-St.Lawrence	Species	Uneven-aged				Yes	
COHORTE	Type	Quebec	Great Lakes-St.Lawrence	Tolerant hardwoods, Boreal hardwoods, Eastern SPF	Uneven-aged	Managed (Selection system)	1, 2, 5		Yes	"Cohorte : Modèle de croissance et d’évolution de la qualité adapté à l’application de coupes partielles."
MERIS	Type	Quebec	Great Lakes-St.Lawrence	Tolerant hardwoods	Uneven-aged	Managed (Selection system)	1, 2, 5, 7		Yes	Simulation module working with SaMARE to evaluate economic yields of uneven-aged silviculture
MGM	distance-independent, individual tree-based	Alberta	Boreal	Boreal hardwoods, Western SPF	Even-aged	Unmanaged	1,2			Mixedwood Growth Model (MGM)
FORECAST		British Columbia, Alberta, Saskatchewan					3			FORECAST (model)
TASS	Type	British Columbia	Forest Region						No	
TIPSY	Type	British Columbia	Forest Region	Western SPF	Even-aged	Managed (Plantations)	2, 5		No	
SYLVER	Type	British Columbia	Forest Region	Western SPF	Even-aged	Managed	2,5,7		No	System for evaluating the impact of Silviculture on Yield, Lumber Value, and Economic Return https://www.for.gov.bc.ca/hts/growth/sylver/sylver_description.html Di Lucca, C.M. 1999. TASS/SYLVER/TIPSY: systems for predicting the impact of silvicultural practices on yield, lumber value, economic return and other benefits. In: Stand Density Management Conference: Using the Planning Tools. November 23–24, 1998, Colin R. Bamsey [Ed.] Clear Lake Ltd., Edmonton, AB. pp. 7–16. https://www.for.gov.bc.ca/hts/growth/download/TASS_SYLVER_TIPSY(DiLucca1999).pdf
TADAM	Type	British Columbia	Forest Region	Western SPF	Even-aged	Managed (Plantations)	2, 5			"TADAM: A dynamic whole-stand approximation for the TASS growth model" "TADAM"
