= Hybrid models of forest production =

Hybrid models of forest production, sometimes abbreviated to hybrid models, combine growth and yield modelling with physiological modelling.

== See also ==
- FORECAST
- Law of Maximum
