= February 2026 North American blizzard =

2026 storm in the United States

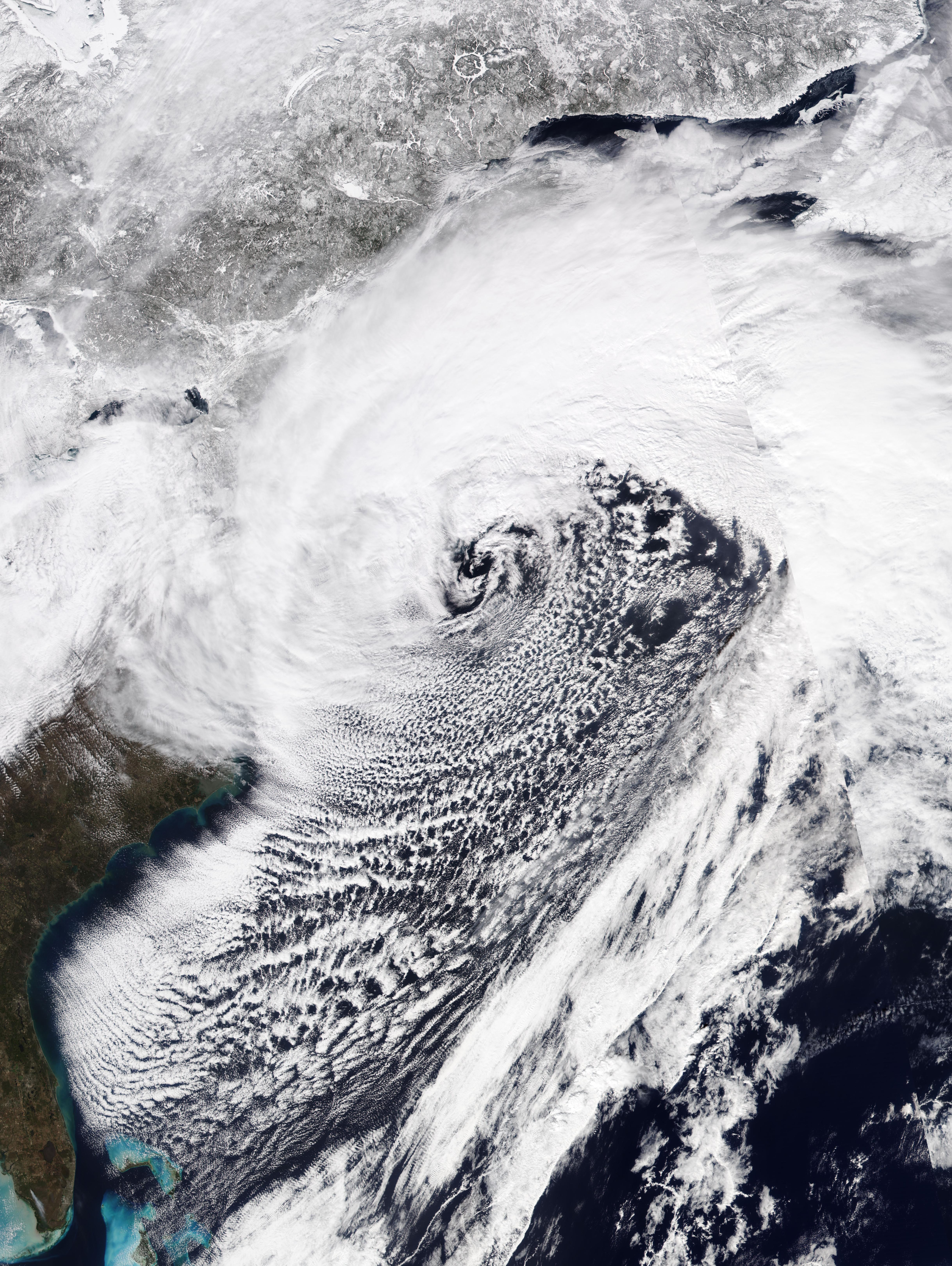
- NOAA-20 satellite image of the extratropical cyclone responsible for the blizzard near the Northeastern United States at peak intensity at 17:45 UTC (12:45 p.m. EST) on February 23, 2026.

Meteorological history
- Formed: February 20, 2026
- Exited land: February 24, 2026
- Dissipated: February 27, 2026

Category 3 "Major" blizzard
- Regional snowfall index: 9.69 (NOAA)
- Highest winds: 75 mph (120 km/h) (1-minute sustained winds)
- Highest gusts: 98 mph (158 km/h) at Wellfleet, Massachusetts
- Lowest pressure: 965 mbar (hPa); 28.50 inHg
- Max. snowfall: Snow – 37.9 in (96 cm) at Rhode Island T. F. Green International Airport, Rhode Island

Overall effects
- Fatalities: 30 total
- Damage: $500 million (2026 USD)
- Areas affected: Ohio Valley, Northeastern United States (particularly New England and the Mid-Atlantic states), and Atlantic Canada
- Power outages: > 600,000
- Part of the 2025–26 North American winter

From February 22–24, 2026, a powerful, historic and deadly blizzard, unofficially named Winter Storm Hernando by The Weather Channel and various media, or more commonly the Blizzard of 2026, caused extensive impacts across the Northeastern United States. The storm dropped 1–2 feet (12–24 in; 30–61 cm) of snow across a large swath of the megalopolis from Philadelphia to Boston, with up to 3 feet (36 in; 91 cm) in southeastern New England, while also bringing blizzard conditions, strong gusty winds, and coastal flooding to the shorelines of the region. Originating out of a shortwave trough that moved ashore on the West Coast of the United States on February 20, the system swiftly moved eastwards across the country before beginning to consolidate late the following day. A new surface low developed off the southeastern United States early on February 22 and began moving north, before rapidly strengthening overnight, bringing blizzard conditions and very heavy snowfall to the Northeast corridor on February 23, moving into Atlantic Canada by later that day. The blizzard gradually weakened after exiting Canada, before being absorbed into another system on February 27 after passing over Iceland.

States of emergency were declared in seven states, including New Jersey, New York and large portions of New England. Heavy precipitation was anticipated for major U.S. metropolitan areas, some of which were predicted to set new records. Blizzard warnings were issued for a majority of northeastern Mid-Atlantic states, the first such in New York City and Boston, respectively, since March 2017 and January 2022. Travel bans were enacted in multiple regions such as New York City and the state of New Jersey. The blizzard was described by some as among the worst to threaten the Northeast since the blizzard of 1996.

A total of 30 fatalities from the blizzard have been confirmed: 15 in New Jersey, 6 in New York, 2 each in Connecticut, Maryland, Pennsylvania, and Rhode Island, and one in Massachusetts. Over 600,000 people lost power at the height of the blizzard due to strong gusty winds. Blizzard conditions were verified across numerous locations, including New Jersey and Massachusetts, with both daily and all-time snowfall records being broken throughout the Northeast. Hurricane-strength wind gusts were reported in New England, nearly reaching 100 mph (160 km/h) in the immediate coastal regions. Coastal flooding caused minor to moderate damage along the Jersey Shore and surrounding waters. Total damage was estimated to be $500 million.

== Meteorological history ==
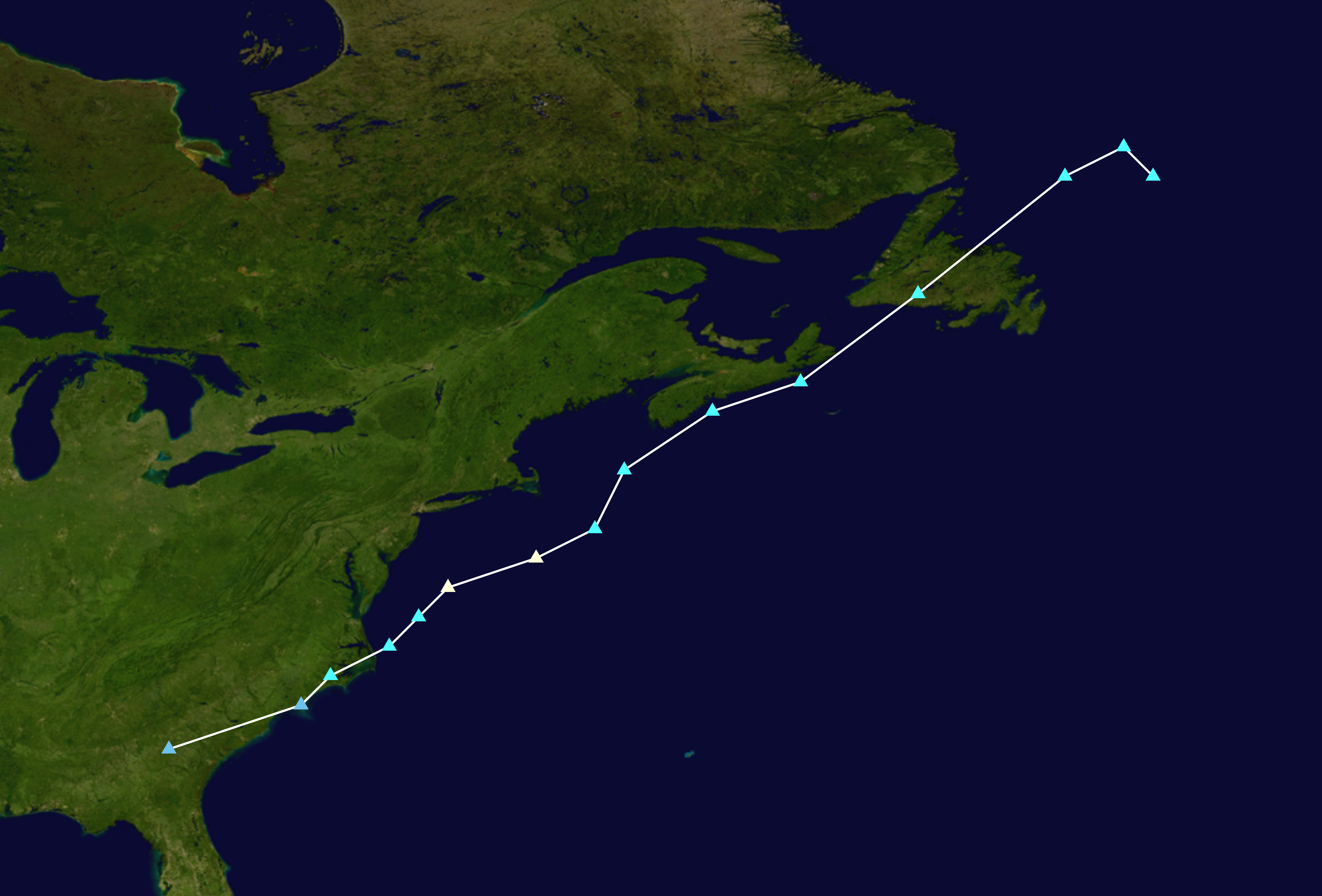
Map plotting the storm's track and intensity, according to the Saffir–Simpson scale Map key Saffir–Simpson scale Tropical depression (≤38 mph, ≤62 km/h) Tropical storm (39–73 mph, 63–118 km/h) Category 1 (74–95 mph, 119–153 km/h) Category 2 (96–110 mph, 154–177 km/h) Category 3 (111–129 mph, 178–208 km/h) Category 4 (130–156 mph, 209–251 km/h) Category 5 (≥157 mph, ≥252 km/h) Unknown Storm type Tropical cyclone Subtropical cyclone Extratropical cyclone, remnant low, tropical disturbance, or monsoon depression

In mid-February 2026, the Weather Prediction Center (WPC) began highlighting the development of a potential coastal storm in the Northeastern U.S. within the February 20–23 timeframe. Key factors in the development included a shortwave trough originating from the Pacific Ocean. Initial forecasts were uncertain as forecasting models depicted differing tracks of the storm, which would determine the level of impacts across the coastal areas. On February 19, the shortwave moved ashore into the West Coast of the United States in the state of California. The next day, the disturbance moved eastward across the Rocky Mountains, dropping light snowfall accumulations across small portions of the High Plains. By February 21, a stationary front was situated over the southeastern United States, where the main low was forecasted to form.

As the mid- and upper-level disturbances aligned in a more favorable orientation, cyclogenesis led the formation of a new surface low with a pressure of 1,009 mb (29.8 inHg) off the North Carolina coast early on February 22, which began moving northeastwards. As it strengthened, it developed an eye-like feature. The cyclone then began to rapidly strengthen or "bomb out" during the afternoon and nighttime hours; blizzard conditions began developing along the coastline as winds increased, while intense snowbands with snowfall rates of 1–2 in (2.5–5.1 cm) an hour developed and pivoted west towards New Jersey. Additionally, thundersnow and lightning became likely, as the Storm Prediction Center (SPC) highlighted a corridor in the Northeast outlining the possibility due to intense convection. By 03:00 UTC on February 23, the WPC began issuing periodic storm summary bulletins on the blizzard. The storm explosively deepened to a pressure of 966 mb (28.5 inHg) by 15:00 UTC, producing heavy snow and hurricane-force wind gusts in southeastern New England. It would further deepen to a pressure of 965 mb (28.5 inHg) by 21:00 UTC as conditions in the Mid-Atlantic and New England began to improve while heavy snow bands began impacting coastal Maine. Snowfall began to end early on February 24 as the storm headed away from New England. The WPC issued its last storm summary at 09:00 UTC.

== Preparations ==
Weather alerts at 1:50 a.m. EST (06:50 UTC) on February 22 in advance of the winter storm around Pennsylvania and New Jersey
Blizzard warning	Winter storm warning
Winter weather advisory	Storm warning
Gale warning	Small craft advisory

=== United States ===
The National Weather Service (NWS) warned of potential blizzard conditions in areas such as Long Island and regions closer to the ocean in anticipation of strong gusty winds and whiteout conditions. The 53rd Weather Reconnaissance Squadron 71 from the Keesler Air Force Base in Biloxi, Mississippi was sent to gather data on the environment on February 21.

Starting on February 20, winter storm watches were issued for much of the coastal areas of the Northeastern United States, encompassing areas from Washington, D.C., to Cape Cod, Massachusetts. By February 22, winter storm warnings were issued for parts of the Hudson Valley and Pennsylvania, while blizzard warnings covered all of Delaware, eastern Maryland, all of New Jersey, all of Connecticut and New York City—the first such warnings issued there since January 1996, February 2010 and March 2017, respectively—and into southern New England. It was also the first such warning for Boston and all of Rhode Island since January 2022 and for all 21 New Jersey counties since January 1996. In addition, coastal flood warnings were issued from the Jersey Shore into New York City and upwards toward the counties of Westchester and Fairfield.

An estimated 8,000 flights for February 22–23 were cancelled by airlines, with over 22,000 of them being delayed by the evening of February 22. Almost 1,000 of the cancellations were from Newark Liberty International Airport, John F. Kennedy International Airport, and LaGuardia Airport. Due to the storm, Amtrak cancelled over 30 trains.

==== Mid-Atlantic ====
===== New York and New Jersey =====
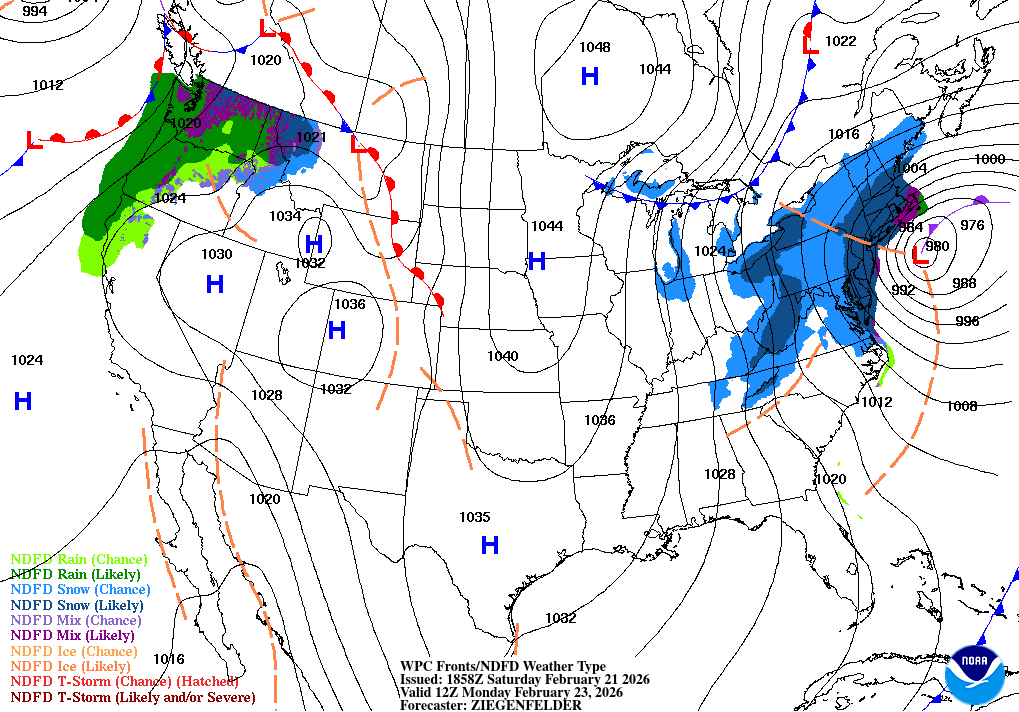
WPC forecast valid for Monday, February 23, 2026, at 12z, issued February 21. Blue indicates snow, green indicates rain, and purple indicates mixed precipitation; darker shades highlight heavier precipitation.

New York governor Kathy Hochul declared a state of emergency for 22 counties on February 21, including the activation of over 100 members of its National Guard. A travel ban was issued for all commercial vehicles and tractor trailers from I-84 and points south, including the New York State Thruway/I-87, beginning at 4 p.m. EST on February 22. PSEG Long Island (PSEG) warned residents about strong winds and heavy snowfall with the likelihood of power outages.

Near-blizzard conditions before dawn on February 23rd in New Jersey

In New York City, where roughly 18–24 inches (46–61 cm) of snow were anticipated, Mayor Zohran Mamdani said that snowplow operations would begin on February 21. Its Department of Sanitation shifted to a 12-hour schedule with 5,000 workers. That same day, a "code blue" took effect, starting at 4 p.m. EST. On February 22, Mamdani announced the closure of all public schools, as well as a citywide travel ban, beginning at 9 p.m. EST. Public libraries across the boroughs of New York, Brooklyn and Queens were closed that day. The Metropolitan Transportation Authority (MTA) suspended infrastructure projects and de-icer trains were deployed. Metro-North Railroad announced they would be running hourly schedules for the Harlem, New Haven, and Hudson lines, while the Long Island Rail Road would operate a Sunday schedule for February 23.

New Jersey governor Mikie Sherrill declared a state of emergency on February 21, urging residents to stay off the roads. On February 22, its Department of Transportation (NJDOT) confirmed that around 3,400 workers were prepared to start pretreating roads. That night, the Office of Emergency Management issued a statewide travel ban, starting at 9 p.m. EST. Near the Jersey Shore, where upwards of 30 inches (76 cm) and wind gusts of 60 miles per hour (97 km/h) were predicted, some stores reported that they were running low on salt supplies due to residents buying snow preparation equipment, which had just been restocked following significant depletion after a major winter storm in January. In Atlantic City, particularly in low-lying neighborhoods that were at extensive risk of coastal flooding, people were advised to avoid traveling. NJ Transit suspended buses and light rails, beginning at 6 p.m. EST on February 22.

===== Pennsylvania, Maryland, and Delaware =====
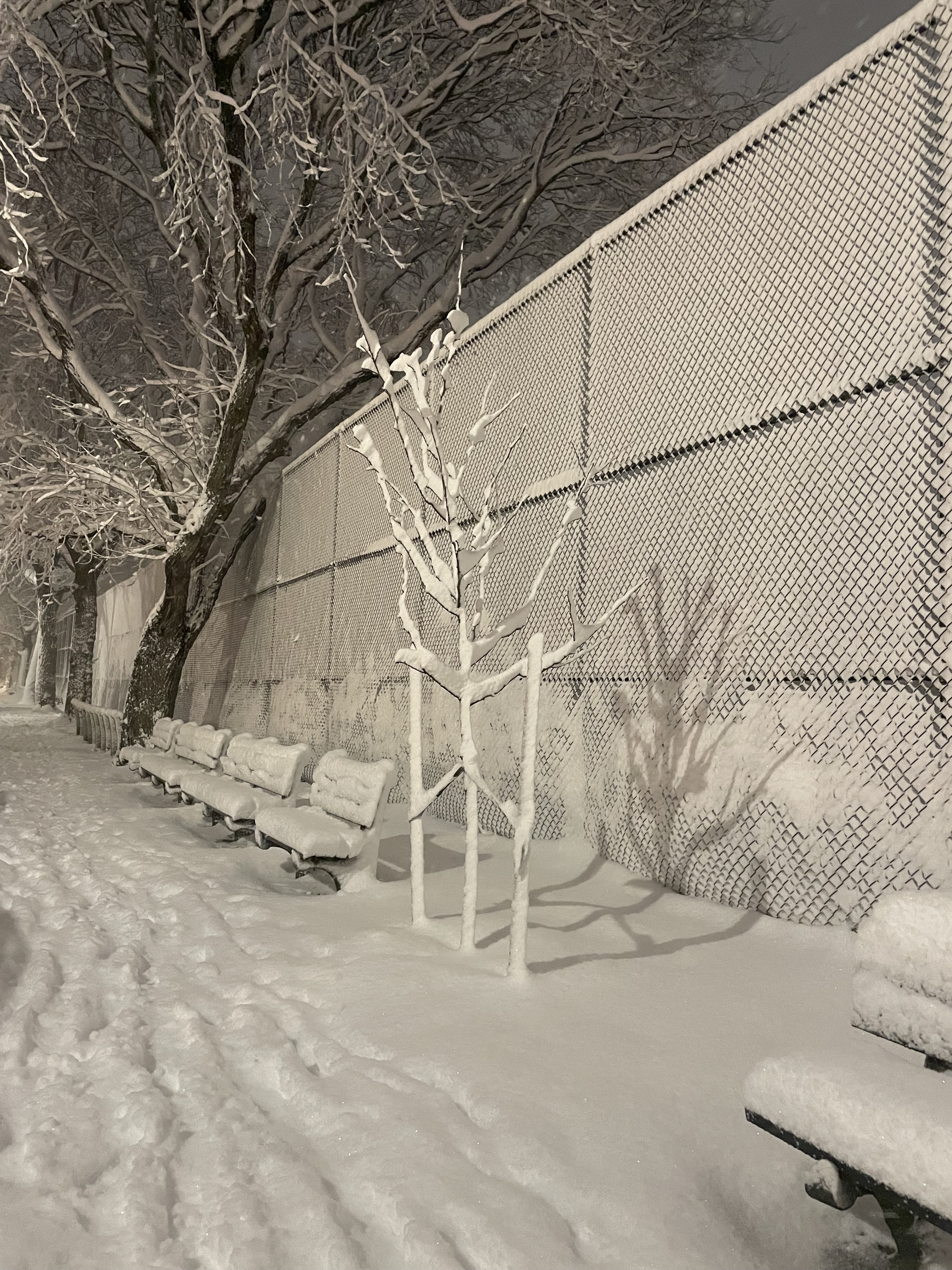
Snow-covered benches in Brooklyn, New York during the blizzard.

Pennsylvania governor Josh Shapiro issued a disaster emergency declaration on February 22. Its Department of Transportation (PennDOT) announced that approximately 60,000 tons of salt were ready across five counties. Over 170 trucks began pretreating roadways on February 21, having been delayed by a day due to wet roads from rain on February 19. In Philadelphia, Mayor Cherelle Parker and multiple communities declared snow emergencies. A "code blue" went into effect from February 22–25, citing below-freezing temperatures and heavy snowfall. Warming centers were opened for the homeless, and procedures were implemented to keep those people safe. The School District of Philadelphia switched to virtual learning for February 23. Restrictions on vehicles were put in place on most major roadways in eastern Pennsylvania, including I-76, I-78, I-81, I-83, I-84, I-95, I-276/Pennsylvania Turnpike, I-283, I-295, I-380, I-476, I-676, PA 33, and US 22.

Maryland governor Wes Moore declared a "state of preparedness" on February 21, coordinating readiness efforts statewide and issued a state of emergency on February 22. 45 members of its National Guard were deployed. Government offices were closed for February 23. In Baltimore, its Emergency Operation Center was activated ahead of the storm. Warming centers were opened citywide on February 22, including those in Baltimore County.

Delaware governor Matt Meyer declared a state of emergency on February 22. Later that day, Meyer issued a "level 2 driving restriction", which went into effect at 9 p.m. EST. Both of its Emergency Management Agency and Emergency Operations Center were activated. Drive-on surf fishing crossings were closed in three state parks. All state offices across the three counties were closed on February 23.

===== Virginia, West Virginia, and Washington D.C. =====
In Washington, D.C., Mayor Muriel Bowser deployed around 200 snowplows, with road treatments beginning by noon on February 22. Shelter hours were adjusted as well. In Virginia, its Department of Transportation briefly held off treating roadways, owing to concerns of rainfall washing away salts. In Norfolk, while flood levels were not expected to reach those necessary to activate their parking plan, residents were advised to avoid driving on flooded roadways. An "overflow" resource plan was activated for people in need of shelter. In West Virginia, multiple schools were delayed or closed for February 23.

==== New England ====
===== Connecticut, Massachusetts, and Rhode Island =====
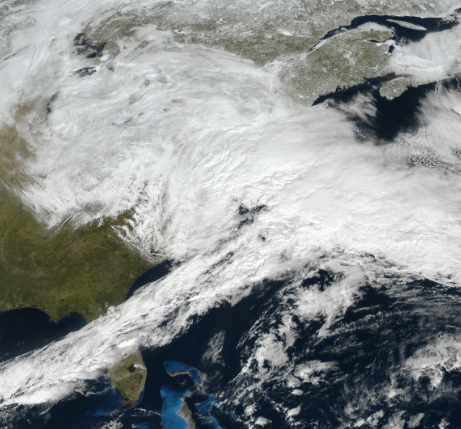
The blizzard developing off the southeastern United States on February 22.

Connecticut governor Ned Lamont declared a state of emergency on February 21. Afterwards, Lamont ordered a partial activation of its Emergency Operations Center, as well as its Severe Cold Weather Protocol. Over 600 snowplows and specialized equipment were available, while hundreds of workers were put on standby to assist with damages and outages. During preparations, storm crews faced depleted budgets after multiple rounds of snow throughout the winter. In New Haven, Mayor Justin Elicker activated its Emergency Operations Center. Several warming centers were opened citywide for February 23–24. Snow emergencies were declared in Stamford and Bridgeport, respectively, on February 21–22. In West Hartford, a parking ban was issued on February 22. Statewide, school districts announced closures for February 23.

Massachusetts governor Maura Healey declared a state of emergency on February 22. Over 200 members of its National Guard, and the state's Emergency Operations Center was activated. A coastal flood watch was issued for the eastern coast of Massachusetts, including Martha's Vineyard and Nantucket, for strong winds and heavy precipitation. Its Department of Transportation (MassDOT) issued a travel restriction on commercial trucks on February 22. On February 23, a travel ban was issued for four counties. In Boston, Mayor Michelle Wu declared a snow emergency on February 22. Ahead of the storm, over 900 spreaders and snowplows were deployed. Multiple parking bans went into effect, including in Fall River and Cambridge. School districts announced closures and delays for February 23.

Rhode Island governor Dan McKee declared a state of emergency on February 22. Its Department of Transportation had around 500 snowplows from both the state and vendors as well as 60,000 tons of salt. During the morning of February 21, the city of Providence began to give out free salt to its residents. Emergency pop-up shelters were opened, including a warming center in East Providence.

===== New Hampshire and Maine =====
Ahead of the storm, various New Hampshire school districts announced closures and delays for February 23 in anticipation of the storm. Extra staff were put on standby in Hampton, and the Hampton Police Department announced they would open their office as a warming shelter. Additionally, a snow emergency and parking ban were declared for the town beginning at 1 a.m. on February 23.

Numerous school districts in Maine cancelled classes for February 23 ahead of the storm. City and town halls were also closed for February 23.

==== Southeast ====
Winter storm and winter weather advisories were in effect for areas along the North Carolina-Tennessee border. Several schools in both states had switched to remote learning, delays, or closures as a result.

=== Canada ===
Environment and Climate Change Canada issued special weather statements and yellow winter storm watches for most of the Maritimes by February 21. On February 22, many parts of Nova Scotia was under an orange weather warning. The emergency operations center of Nova Scotia Power was set to activate on February 23. Winds were forecasted to exceed 80 km/h (50 mph). Numerous schools in Nova Scotia had early dismissal or were closed. Municipal offices, facilities, and libraries in Halifax were closed for February 23, and a parking ban was set to take effect on February 24. The Halifax Stanfield International Airport had several flight cancellations. In southern New Brunswick, some schools were closed on February 23. Several ferries were cancelled as well. Yellow warnings were in effect for parts of Prince Edward Island and southern and eastern New Brunswick by February 23.

Eastern Newfoundland faced back-to-back storms over the week preceding the storm, with St. John's recording 110 cm (43 in) of snow and Paradise at over 150 cm (59 in). Environment and Climate Change Canada issued a yellow winter storm warning for parts of Newfoundland and Labrador as well as coastal flood advisories, wind warnings, and blowing snow advisories on February 21.

== Impact ==
Radar loop of the blizzard from February 22–24

=== United States ===
By the morning of February 23, more than 511,000 homes and businesses were without electricity. A total of over 650,000 were without power across the Northeast, with Massachusetts and New Jersey hardest hit. Over 9,000 flights were cancelled and over 10,000 were delayed from February 23 to the evening of February 24. The frigid conditions caused natural gas prices to jump 4%.

==== Mid-Atlantic ====
===== New Jersey and New York =====
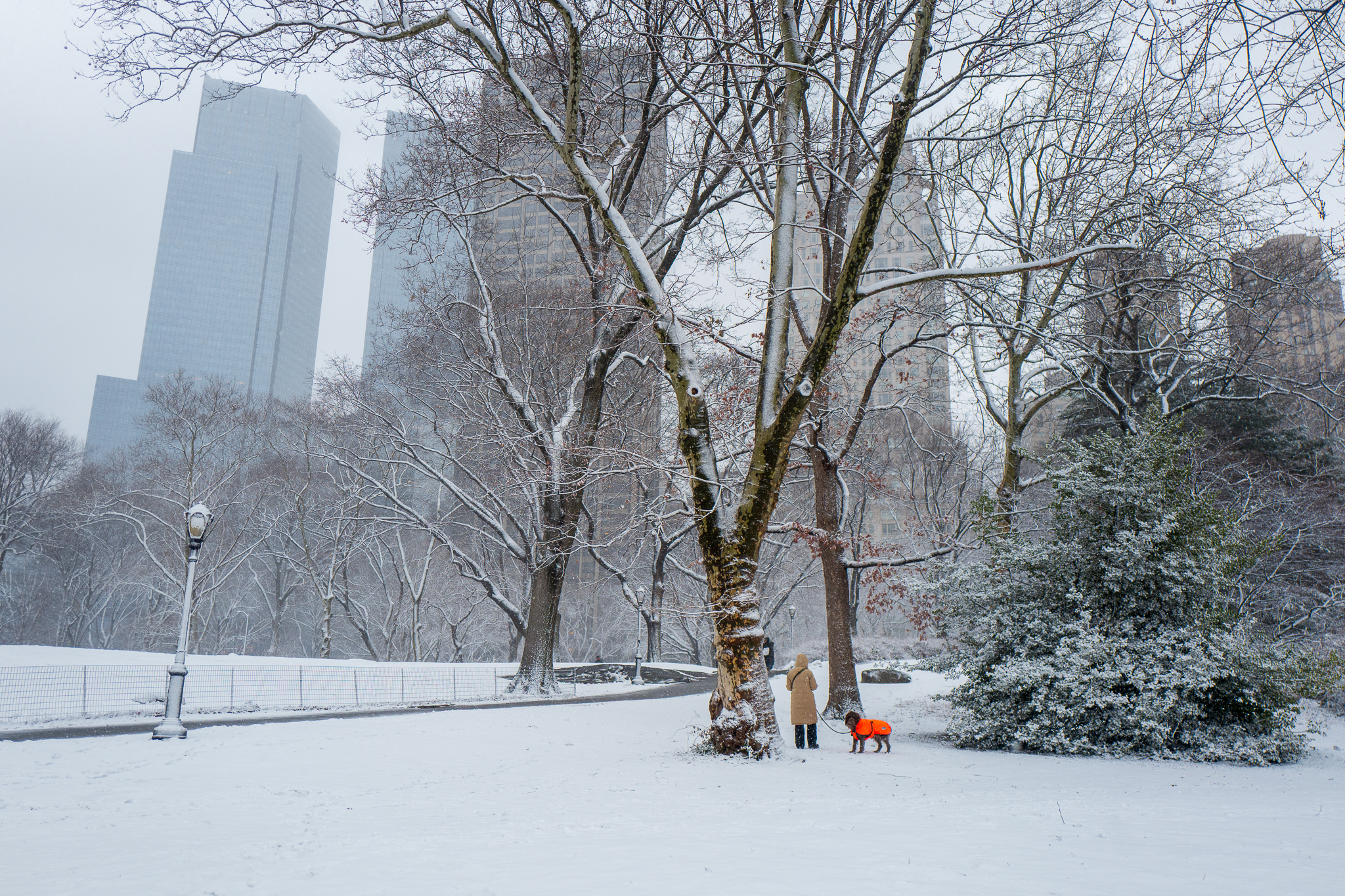
A snow-covered landscape in Central Park on February 22

In New Jersey, frequent wind gusts above 30–35 mph (48–56 km/h) contributed to whiteout and blizzard conditions, with a maximum peak of 60 mph (97 km/h) observed in Atlantic City. Approximately 100,000 customers experienced power outages. In Burlington County, there were about 4,000 power outages remaining by February 24, most of which were in Medford, Evesham, and Washington Township. Heavy wet snow damaged the local energy grid of Atlantic City Electric, leading officials to estimate that customers would not receive electricity back until the following weekend. Across South Jersey, over 4,000 customers were still without electricity by February 25. On February 23, more than 800 flights were cancelled at Newark Liberty International Airport; where 27.1 inches (69 cm) was reported.

Snowfall totals of over 2 feet (24 in; 61 cm) were observed across parts of eastern New Jersey, mainly east of I-95; the highest total was over 30.7 inches (78 cm) in Lyndhurst. Blizzard conditions were officially verified in Newark and Teterboro Airport. On the Jersey Shore, while beach erosion and coastal flooding were less severe than anticipated, moderate damage was reported in areas, including Surf City on Long Beach Island, where substantial coastal flooding was observed. In Upper Township, crews worked to remove downed trees. The New Jersey Department of Health confirmed 15 deaths during the blizzard and severe cold on March 3.

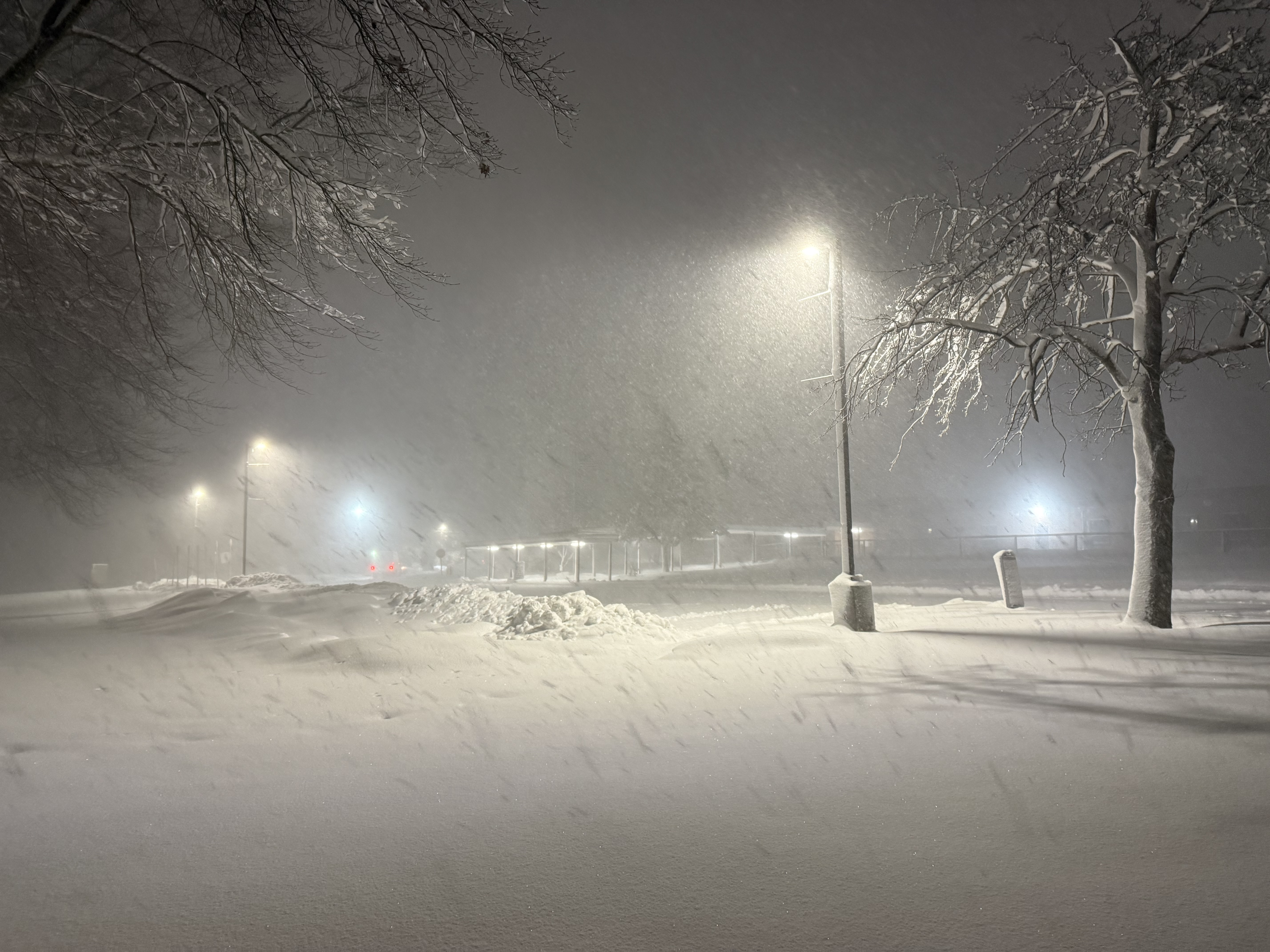
Heavy snow in New Jersey on February 23

Across the New York metropolitan area, new daily snowfall records were set for February 22. In New York City, 19.7 inches (50 cm) of snow fell in Central Park, making it one of the city's top 10 snowstorms in terms of accumulation. In Bay Shore, a Department of Transportation plow truck was overturned on its side. Thundersnow was reported over Lower Manhattan. In Long Island, intense wind gusts and extreme snow accumulations were observed; the highest peak wind gust was over 84 mph (135 km/h) at Montauk Point, while Islip recorded a snowfall accumulation of 31 inches (79 cm). A peak wind gust of 62 mph (100 km/h) was reported at John F. Kennedy International Airport, while LaGuardia Airport peaked at 52 mph (84 km/h). After the blizzard, it was reported some portions of Staten Island had remained unplowed, with snow drifts still covering streets. A man was found dead buried under snow in Deer Park. Two others in Suffolk County and three in Nassau County also died after shoveling snow.

===== Maryland, Pennsylvania, and Delaware =====
In Maryland, two fatalities occurred after a tree fell on a car carrying three passengers. Maryland State Police reported to over 343 crashes from snow-covered roads. In Ocean City, damaged trees leaned toward houses and blocked roads and sidewalks. In Worcester County, more than 15,000 power outages were reported.

A multivehicle crash resulted in two fatalities in Lower Nazareth, Pennsylvania. Though it is unknown if it was related to the storm. On February 23, Philadelphia broke a daily snowfall record, surpassing the record set in 1987.

In Philadelphia, 14 inches (36 cm) were recorded at Philadelphia International Airport. In multiple neighborhoods, downed trees and power outages were caused by strong wind gusts.

Wilmington, Delaware broke a daily record set in 2001, recording 5.4 inches (14 cm) of snow on February 22.

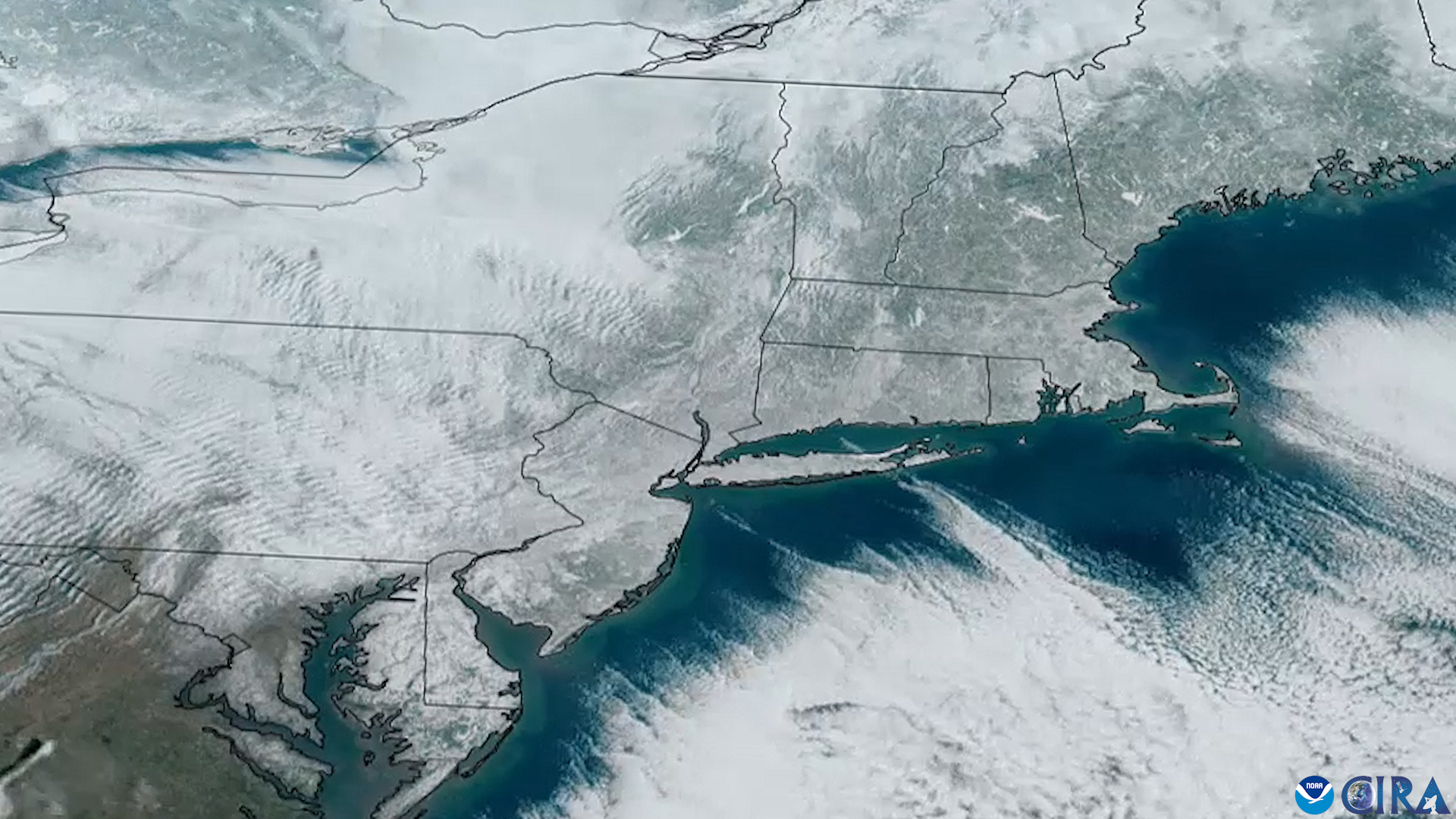
Satellite image of snow cover across the Northeast after the blizzard on February 24.

===== Virginia, West Virginia, and Washington D.C. =====
A&N Electric Cooperative reported 7,258 customers were without power by the morning of February 23. Wintergreen, Virginia had a total of 15 inches (38 cm) of snow.

Heavy snowfall of over 1 foot (30 cm) occurred in the mountains of West Virginia. The weather resulted in crashes on West Virginia interstates. 22.5 inches (57 cm) of snow was recorded near Holly River State Park.

Catholic University in Washington D.C. recorded 3.8 inches (9.7 cm) of snow at 8 a.m. on February 23.

==== New England ====
===== Massachusetts, Rhode Island, and Connecticut =====
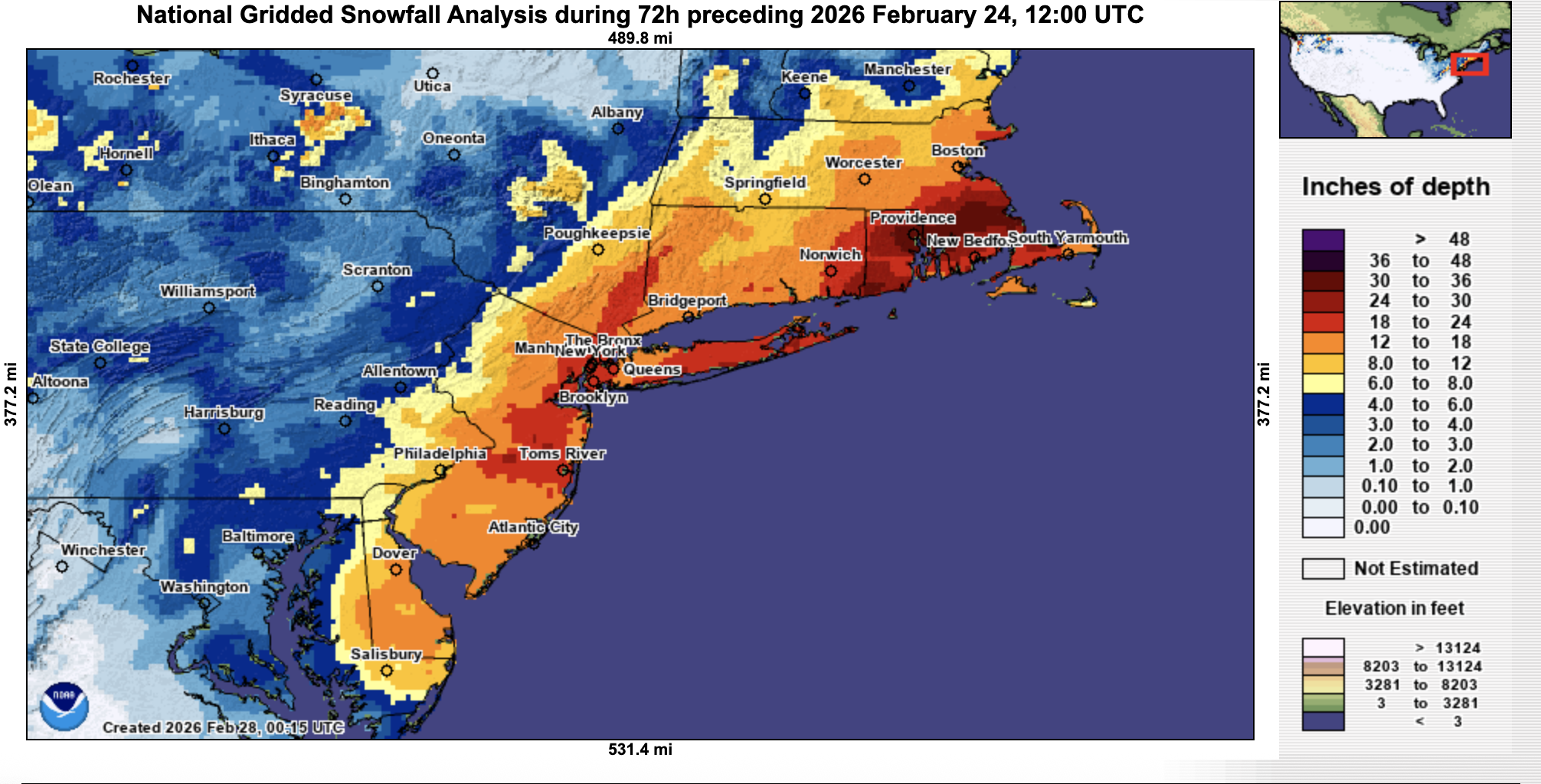
Observed snowfall totals from the February 22–24 blizzard

958 flights were cancelled at the Logan International Airport by the morning of February 23, while over 140 flights were cancelled at the Bradley International Airport.

The Rhode Island T.F. Green International Airport suspended all operations for February 23. Hurricane-force gusts occurred in parts of Rhode Island and Massachusetts, with Wellfleet recording a gust of 77 mph (124 km/h), causing severe damage. Wellfleet would see a peak wind gust of 98 mph (158 km/h). The Rhode Island T.F. Green International Airport recorded both its snowiest two-day and snowiest single day on record, with a total of 37.9 inches (96 cm) falling during the storm, beating records set during the Northeastern United States blizzard of 1978 and January 1996 United States blizzard, respectively. Other high snowfall totals include Whitman, Massachusetts which recorded 33.7 inches (86 cm), and North Stonington, Connecticut which reported 30.8 inches (78 cm) of snow.

Two deaths in relation to the blizzard were confirmed by the Rhode Island Department of Health. A student died of carbon monoxide poisoning as his car was buried with snow. The second death in Rhode Island was shoveling-related. There were 131 crashes across Massachusetts by 4 p.m. on February 24 with six causing injuries. A man clearing snow on the Mass Pike was struck and killed by a tractor-trailer. Two fatalities associated with the blizzard occurred in Connecticut. One died of hypothermia in New Milford on February 22 and another from an accident on February 23.

By the morning of February 23, many residents in New England had no power due to the storm. Gusty winds and heavy snow continued through the night. The storm eventually exited the Mid-Atlantic region, moving northeast to New England and eventually to Canada.

===== New Hampshire, Maine, and Vermont =====
Blizzard conditions occurred in Portland and Sanford, Maine. Minor flooding and beach erosion occurred in Maine due to 2–3 feet (0.61–0.91 m) of storm surge and 10–15 feet (3.0–4.6 m) waves. Near hurricane-force wind gusts occurred as well. Cutler and Trescott had 12 inches (30 cm) of snow.

In New Hampshire, Hampton and Rochester confirmed blizzard conditions. No significant coastal flooding occurred in Hampton. Both Dover and New Ipswich both saw 9.5 inches (24 cm) of snow.

A vehicle slid off and crashed on I-91 in Vermont on February 23. A total of 6.8 inches (17 cm) of snow fell in Readsboro.

==== Elsewhere ====
A dusting of snow occurred in parts Western North Carolina on February 22. By 11:30 a.m. the following day, Grandfather Mountain recorded 7.5 inches (19 cm) of snow while Canton, North Carolina had 5 inches (13 cm) of snow. Fifty-eight flights to and from the Cincinnati/Northern Kentucky International Airport were cancelled due to the storm by the morning of February 23.

=== Canada ===
7,000 customers in the southwest shore of Nova Scotia were without power by the afternoon of February 23. 4,450 customers were without power by 6 p.m. across the province. Thundersnow was reported in the south shore. Over 30 centimetres (12 in) of snow fell in parts of the province, while strong winds caused waist deep snow drift in some places. Light snow and winds continued into the morning of February 24. A total of 41 centimetres (16 in) of snow fell in Newcombville. Gusts of 60–100 km/h (37–62 mph) occurred in Nova Scotia. St. Joseph du Moine reported gusts of up to 160 km/h (99 mph).

285 customers were without power in New Brunswick and seven in Prince Edward Island by 7 a.m. on February 24. Moncton, New Brunswick saw 27 centimetres (11 in) of snow and the province reported gusts 70–90 km/h (43–56 mph). Over 50 accidents occurred across New Brunswick on February 24. Route 15 and the Trans-Canada Highway was closed early in the morning. In Prince Edward Island, wind gusts of 60–80 km/h (37–50 mph) occurred. Foxley River, Prince Edward Island received 22 centimetres (8.7 in) of snow. Snow fell in Newfoundland and Labrador from February 23–24. A power outage caused the CNA Prince Philip Drive Campus to close on the morning of February 24.

== Aftermath ==
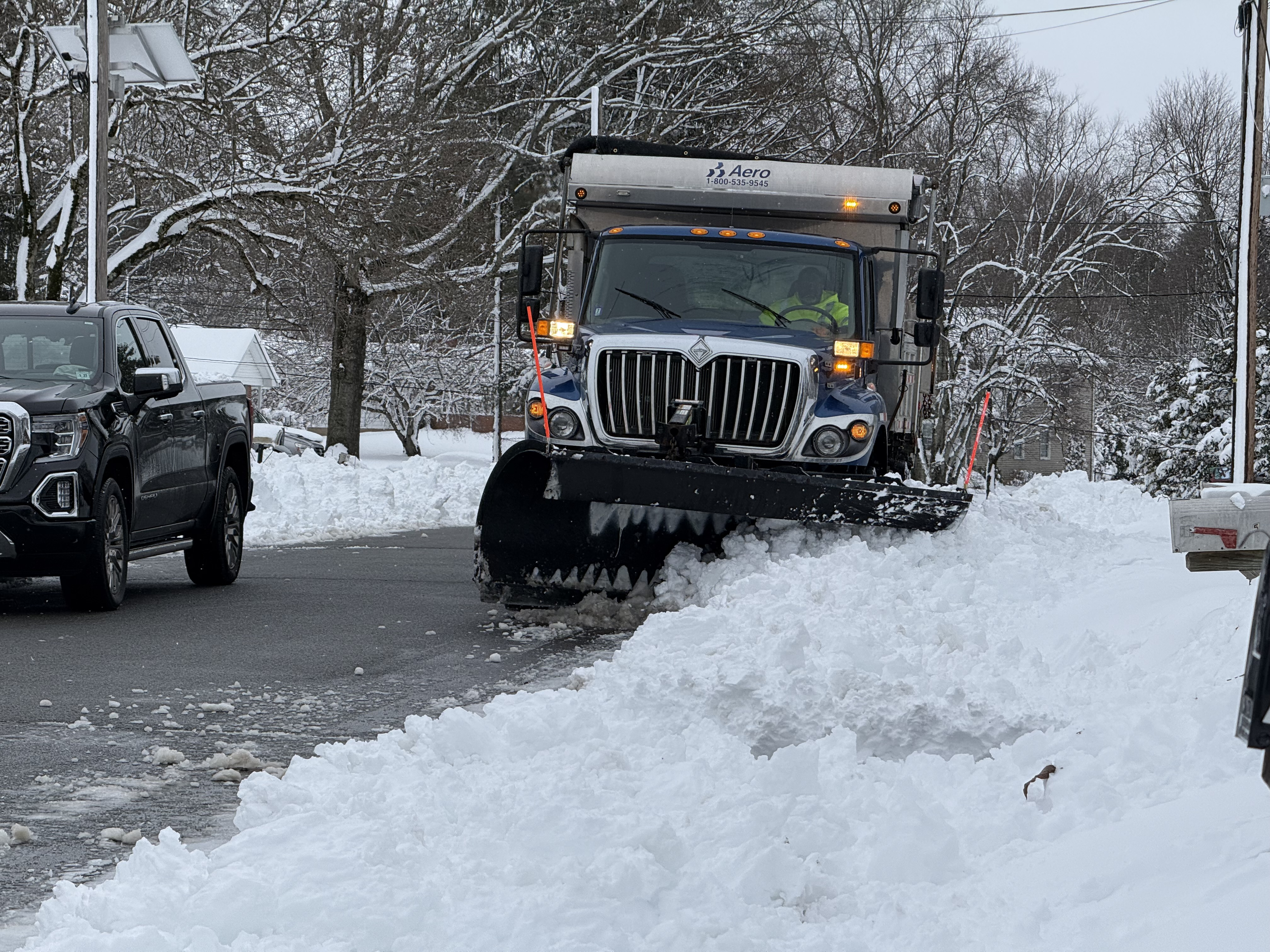
A snow plow clearing snow after the storm in New Jersey

On Wednesday, February 25, a small storm would hit the United States East Coast, adding more snowfall during the week after the storm.

Heavy snowfall resulted in NLSchools cancelling schools for three days, reopening on February 26 in the St. John's area. Heavy snowfall throughout the month of February resulted in St. John's recording the snowiest February on record with 178.2 cm (70.2 in), surpassing the record set in 2006. Additionally, at 42.2 in (107 cm), Providence, Rhode Island saw a record snowy February.

Just fifteen days later, on March 10, Central Park saw its earliest 80 °F (27 °C) temperature on record, passing the previous establishment on March 13, 1990.

Despite FEMA confirming that New Jersey, Rhode Island, Massachusetts and New York met the requirements for federal assistance following the blizzard, on July 29, Donald Trump overrode FEMA to deny aid for those states. While New Jersey governor Mikie Sherrill, New York governor Kathy Hochul, Rhode Island governor Dan McKee and Massachusetts governor Maura Healey appealed the denial, the appeal was denied on September 3.

== Snowfall accumulations and records ==
Reports are preliminary until verified by the National Centers for Environmental Information.

List of highest snowfall accumulations by state during the blizzard
State	Location	Amount	Ref
Connecticut	North Stonington, Connecticut	30.8 in (78 cm)	
Delaware	Long Neck, Delaware	21.0 in (53 cm)	
Massachusetts	New Bedford, Massachusetts	37.0 in (94 cm)	
New Jersey	Lyndhurst, New Jersey	30.7 in (78 cm)	
New York	Islip, New York	31.0 in (79 cm)	
Pennsylvania	Langhorne Borough, Pennsylvania	22.3 in (57 cm)	
Rhode Island	Rhode Island T. F. Green International Airport	37.9 in (96 cm)	

== See also ==
- 2025–26 North American winter
- Weather of 2026
- Great Blizzard of 1888
- December 2010 North American blizzard
