= Redwoods Forest =

Forest at Whakarewarewa, New Zealand

Coordinates: 38°9′30″S 176°16′30″E

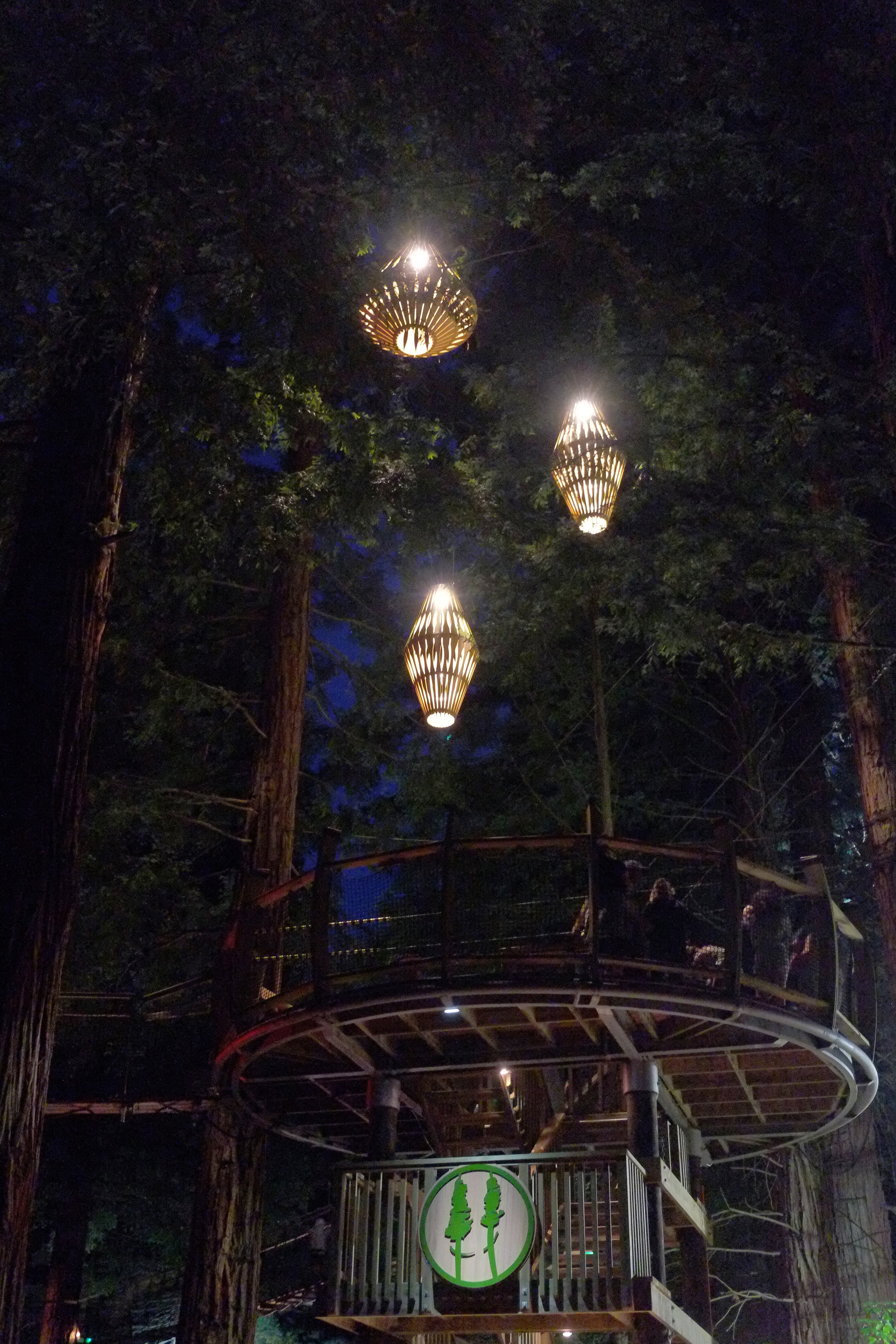
Redwoods Treewalk at night

Redwoods Forest or Redwood Memorial Grove is a forest of naturalised coastal redwood on the outskirts of Rotorua, New Zealand, adjacent to the Whakarewarewa thermal area. The 6 hectares (15 acres) stand of Californian redwoods is part of the larger Whakarewarewa State Forest Park, which is in turn part of the Kaingaroa Forest area.

== History ==
The trees were planted at the beginning of the 20th century as part of a programme to assess the viability of various exotic tree species for commercial forestry in New Zealand. The project originated as a response to clear-cutting of New Zealand's native forests by the end of the 19th century, which drove the New Zealand government to establish a tree nursery at Bay of Plenty to test the viability of different tree species as sources of lumber, which were imported from overseas by ship. The resulting seedlings, including redwoods, were moved and planted in the area in 1901, chiefly using prison labour.

The grove's first timber was harvested in 1915 as fuel. A sawmill was later established in 1939. A walking track was also developed at this point. The grove was eventually opened to the public in 1970, and was designated as a Forest Park under the Forests Act 1949 in 1975. A visitor centre was opened in 1978. The Forest Park destination was removed in 1987 following reorganisation within the Forestry Service. The following year, the government began reducing and selling off forestry assets, leading the grove's lease to be given to the private company Fletcher Challenge Forests. However, a combination of historical importance, stakeholder pressure and high level of public use led to the drafting of a specialised agreement for the management of the Tokorangi Triangle area of the grove. The broader forestry asset sale was additionally delayed by Māori court action, which argued that they were the traditional owners of the land and that it had wrongfully taken from them, and requested the government to retain the land until a settlement could be reached.

Bureaucratic issues delayed the finalising of this agreement until June 1998, when management of the area was given to the Rotorua District Council, managed under lease by Fletcher Challenge. Fletcher Challenge would later split and sell off its assets, with the Whakarewarewa Forest going to Kaingaroa Timberlands, which continued to manage the non-public parts of the forest as a production plantation. In May 2006, Kaingaroa ceded management of the Redwoods Forest to the District Council. In 2009, both the Redwoods Forest and the greater Whakarewarewa woodland was returned to ownership of the Ngāti Whakaue, the iwi native to the Rotorua area, as part of the Treaty of Waitangi claims and settlements, although Whakarewarewa and Redwood Forest continued to be managed by Kaingaroa and the Rotorua District Council until termination would come into effect.

The grove's raised tourist walkway was first ideated by the German engineer Alex Schmid during a visit in 2009. It was erected in 2015, when it was blessed by the kaumātua of the Ngāti Whakaue and opened by Mayor Steve Chadwick.

The grove's original planting consisted of twelve hectares of trees, six of which have survived to the present day. Subsequently, these trees have grown faster than in their native homeland due to the richer, well-drained soil and higher rainfall in the area, reaching over 70 metres (230 ft) height only 100 years later. The tallest redwood in the forest stands at 75 metres tall. Additional seedlings were planted in the area at later dates, including near Lake Rotokākahi.

== Tourism ==
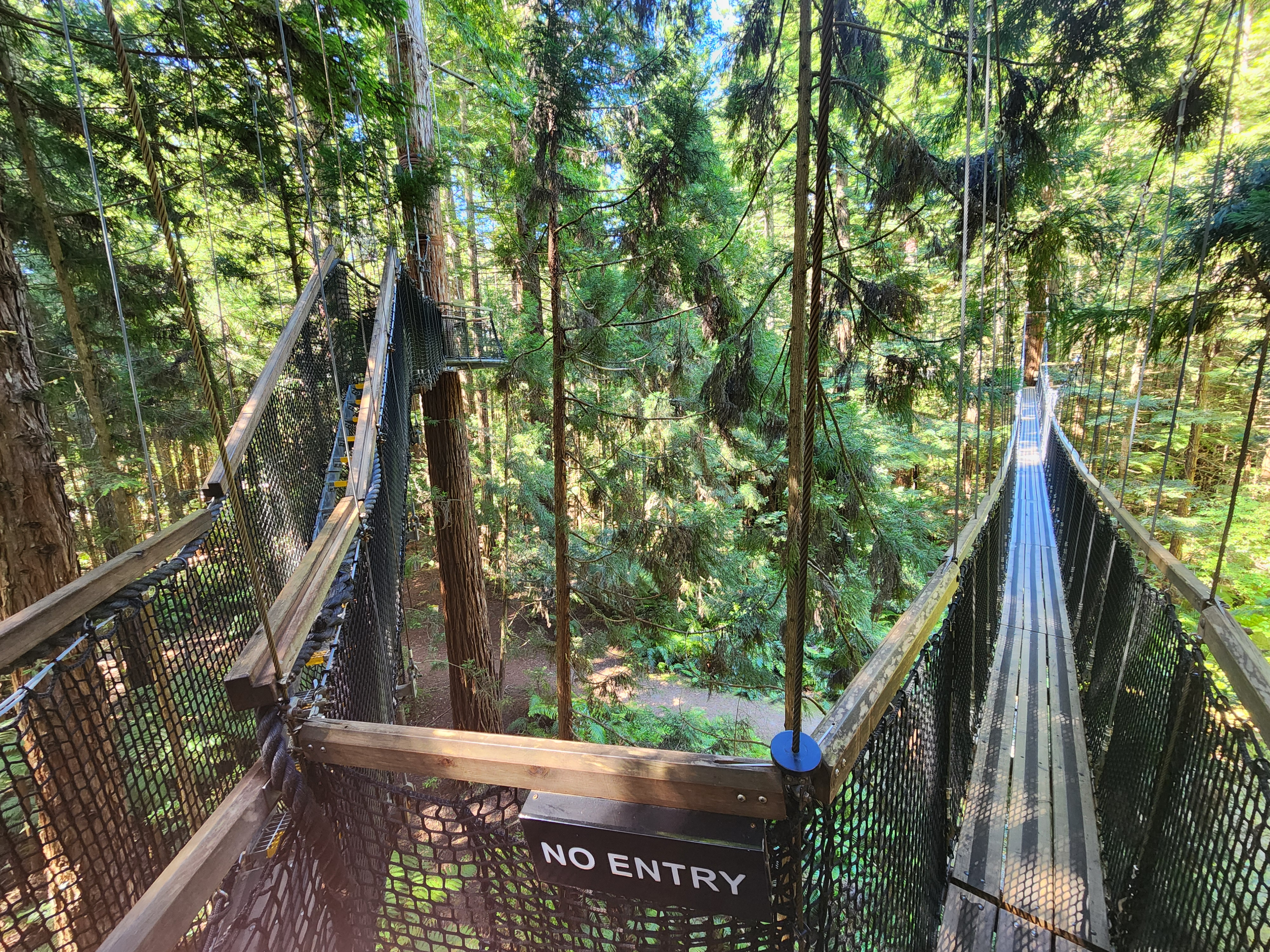
Bridges between trees

The area, also referred to as "Redwood Memorial Grove", is now protected and has become popular for recreational use, containing mountain bike tracks and the Redwoods Treewalk canopy walkway suspended between the trunks of the redwood trees. The walkway consists of 23 bridges connecting 22 redwood trees, and is suspended 12 metres above the ground. Above the walkway, wooden lantern sculptures are also suspended between the tall tree trunks. At night time, these are lit up, and coloured spotlights illuminate some of the forest floor vegetation and tree ferns.

== Ecology ==
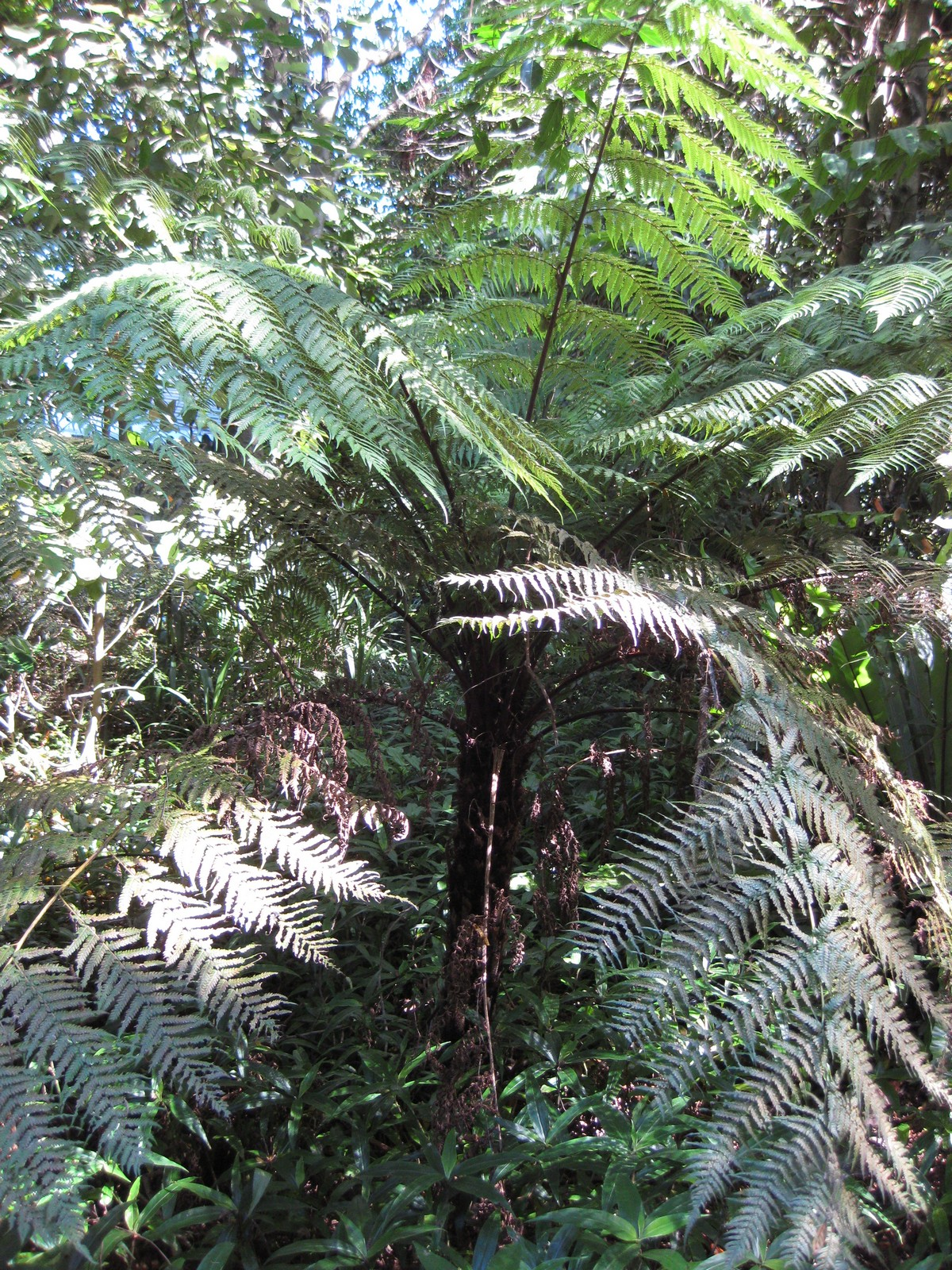
A specimen of rough tree fern, a major understory plant in the park

In addition to redwoods, the forest contains a number of other exotic species introduced during the original forestry experiments. The most successful of these is radiata pine, which makes up the majority of the greater Whakarewarewa State Forest. The undergrowth consists of a number of fern species, including the silver tree fern; the rough tree fern, which is the most common arboreal fern in the grove; the palm-leaf fern, which is the most common creeping fern; the black tree fern, which grows to be the largest local arboreal fern at 20 metres of maximum height; and a variety of spleenwort species. Other native plants include Pittosporum, Coprosma, native Fuchsia, and mānuka. A number of exotic low-growing plants also exist within the park, including foxglove, blackberry, scotch broom and Buddleia.

The Grove is home to a number of introduced bird species, including the tomtit, chaffinch, waxeye and California quail. Native bird species include the New Zealand fantail, tūī, kererū, New Zealand bellbird, and morepork. Mammal life consists entirely of introduced exotics, such as rabbits, possums, wallabies, deer and pigs. Insect life within the forest includes the dragonfly Uropetala carovei and the clapping cicada.
