= Arthur Wallace =

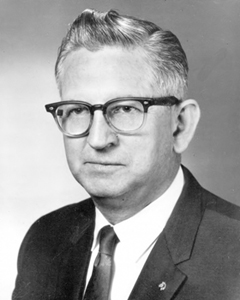
- Born: Arthur Wallace; January 4, 1919; Bear River City, Utah
- Died: October 11, 2008 (aged 89); Santa Monica, California
- Occupations: Professor of Plant Physiology at UCLA; Wallace Laboratories

Arthur Wallace (January 4, 1919 – October 11, 2008), was a soil scientist.

== Biography ==
=== Schooling ===
Wallace received a B.S. from Utah State University (chemistry) in 1943 and at Ph.D. from Rutgers University in 1949 (soils and plant nutrition).

=== Professor ===
He was a professor of Plant Physiology at University of California, Los Angeles (1949–1989).

=== Accomplishments ===
Wallace was elected Fellow of the American Society of Agronomy, of the Soil Science Society of American, of the Crop Science Society of America, and of the American Society for Horticultural Science.

== Work & Publications ==
=== Dr. Iron ===
Wallace was known as "Dr. Iron" for his research and studies on chelated iron. At a meeting in Berkeley, California, held on December 11, 1953, he formulated the structure of EDDHA which was synthesized by his friend, Harry Kroll and which was commercialized by Geigy as Fe-EDDHA and Sequestrene 138. At that time, EDTA, HEEDTA and DTPA were known. Fe-EDTA was effective in the acidic Florida soils but failed in California giving chelates a poor reputation later reversed with the astounding success of Fe-EDDHA.

He helped organize the biannual international iron nutrition and interactions symposia which have been held since 1979. Wallace hosted the first one at UCLA.

=== Working in the Middle East and Africa ===
He worked with plant mineral nutrition problems in the Middle East and Africa. He made 30 visits to Egypt working with Yossef Wiley, minister of agriculture, to solve some of their agricultural production problems.

=== Law of the Maximum ===
Wallace is known for his Law of the Maximum in lieu of Liebig's law of the minimum. The Law of the Maximum predicts plant yield based on the additivity of nutrients, growth factors and stress factors. He formulated 13 sound rules for the use of fertilizers.

=== P.A.M. / Soil Conditioner ===
Wallace is responsible for the current implementation and success of the soil conditioner – linear, water-soluble, anionic polyacrylamide. Monsanto launched the technology of synthetic and natural polyelectrolytes as soil conditions for the formation of water-stable soil aggregates in 1952. The introduction was written by Firman E. Bear, Arthur’s major professor at Rutgers. The product was marketed under the trade name "Krilium." The product technically successful but commercially failed due to the high cost of manufacturing and difficulty of use. Krilium became an example of a scientifically successful product but an economical failure. The technology became an embarrassment with an aversion and hesitance to resolve the causes of failure. Dr. Wallace resolved the technical problems, answering the Krilium problem. PAM was reported to be an economic solution of Krilium to condition soil, to reduce soil erosion, to prevent crusting, to help ameliorate sodic soils and to increase crop yield. Various cries were heard such as – "Do not forget the Krilium failure." PAM is currently fully accepted as a BMP and is used for erosion control such as in burned areas and an economical agricultural soil conditioner.
