= New Zealand Journal of Forestry =

Scientific journal

- Discipline: Forestry
- Language: English
- Edited by: Chris Goulding

Publication details
- History: 1925–present
- Publisher: New Zealand Institute of Forestry (New Zealand)
- Frequency: Quarterly

Standard abbreviations
- ISO 4: N. Z. J. For.

Indexing
- ISSN: 1174-7986

Links
- Journal homepage

The New Zealand Journal of Forestry is the journal of the New Zealand Institute of Forestry. It publishes articles on a wide range of forestry-related topics, primarily on issues that are relevant to New Zealand and the South Pacific region. The published articles include peer reviewed scientific research papers, items of current interest, opinion pieces and book reviews. It is currently edited by Chris Goulding.

Journal articles that are more than three years old are available free from the journal's website.

== Te Kura Ngahere ==
The journal was first published in 1925, under the name Te Kura Ngahere (in Maori Te kura means 'the school', ngahere means 'forest'). At this time the journal was 'produced by the Forestry Club of the Canterbury College School of Forestry, and its aim [was] to discuss forestry in all its aspects'. The first editor, from 1925 to 1934, was F.E. Hutchinson.

In 1925 there was only one university in New Zealand, the University of New Zealand, with district 'colleges' in various New Zealand centres. The Canterbury College School of Forestry began operating in 1924 — only 1 year prior to the first publication of this journal. This means that the early issues of this journal give the reader an interesting insight into the development of forestry and university level forestry education in New Zealand.

The first issue of the journal contains information on the Forestry School's history and development, articles on New Zealand forests, and notes on the experiences of members of the forestry club. In the article 'Forestry as a Profession', we are told:

In primitive times forestry consisted entirely in the harvesting of needed wood from the abundant forest wealth supplied by Nature, so that the first forester was that sturdy and independent being, the bushman, who has wrought mightily here in New Zealand to supply us with timber for our buildings, fertile clearings for our crops, and also, perhaps, to some extent, with barren acres of blackened stumps and bare clay soil—the result of an excess of misdirected energy. Aside from this last point, for which he can hardly be blamed, his work is most necessary and valuable, and he fills an important place in the life of the nation.

This shows an early understanding of the misguided nature of some of the early tree-felling exploits in New Zealand, along with a pride in the role of forestry in New Zealand.

== Shift of control: Canterbury College to New Zealand Institute of Foresters ==
At the end of 1934, the School of Forestry at Canterbury College was forced to 'close its doors temporarily, due to financial stringency'. (It remained closed until the late 1960s.) When the school closed in 1934, the New Zealand Institute of Foresters took over the publication of the journal, and it became the official journal of the institute.

In 1936, the name of the journal changed to the New Zealand Journal of Forestry.

== Past editors ==
- 2002–2005, Professor Bruce Manley
- 2006–2007, Associate Professor Euan Mason, University of Canterbury
- 2008–2011, Piers Maclaren
- 2012–2013, Julian Bateson

== See also ==
- Forestry in New Zealand
