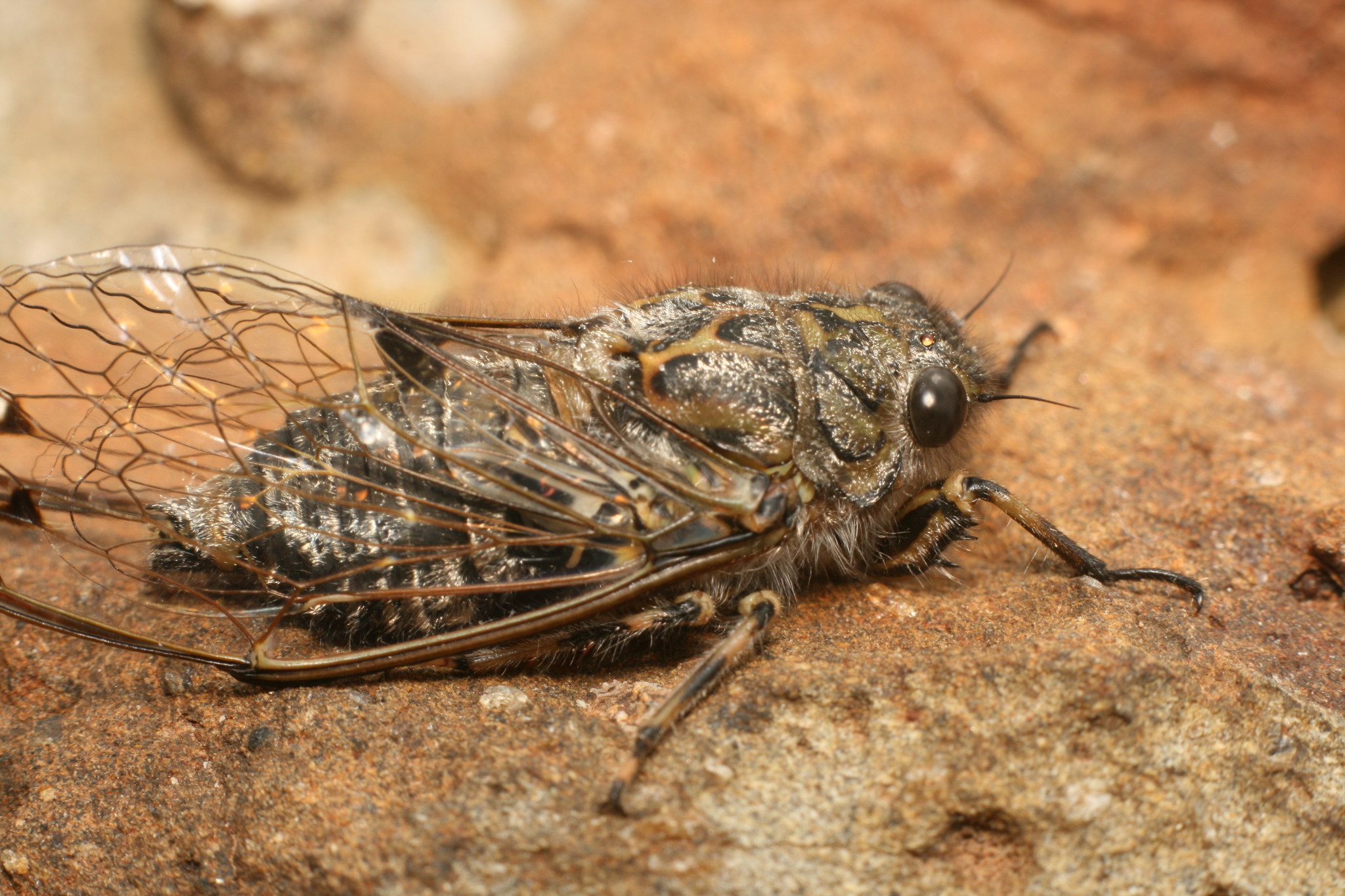

Scientific classification
- Kingdom: Animalia
- Phylum: Arthropoda
- Clade: Pancrustacea
- Class: Insecta
- Order: Hemiptera
- Suborder: Auchenorrhyncha
- Family: Cicadidae
- Genus: Amphipsalta
- Species: A. strepitans

Binomial name
- Amphipsalta strepitans (Kirkaldy, 1909)

Synonyms
- Cicadetta strepitans Kirkaldy, 1909

= Amphipsalta strepitans =

Species of true bug

Amphipsalta strepitans, the chirping cicada, is a species of cicada that is endemic to New Zealand. This species was first described by George Willis Kirkaldy in 1909.
