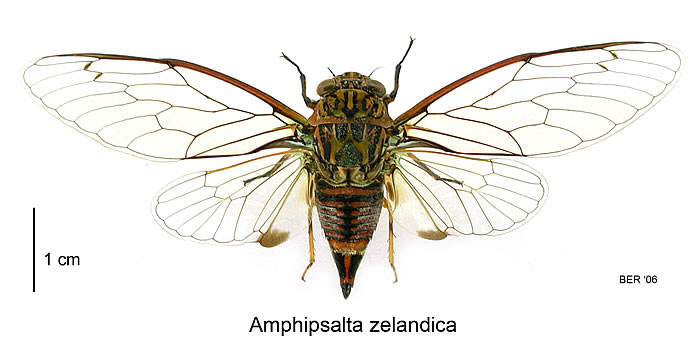
- Chorus cicada, Amphipsalta zelandica

Scientific classification
- Kingdom: Animalia
- Phylum: Arthropoda
- Clade: Pancrustacea
- Class: Insecta
- Order: Hemiptera
- Suborder: Auchenorrhyncha
- Family: Cicadidae
- Genus: Amphipsalta; Dugdale and Fleming, 1969

Audio
- Amphipsalta zelandica singing

= Amphipsalta =

Genus of insects

Amphipsalta, commonly known as clapping cicadas, is a genus of cicada in the family Cicadidae. This genus is endemic to New Zealand.

== Species ==
- Amphipsalta cingulata (Fabricius, 1775)
- Amphipsalta strepitans (Kirkaldy, 1909)
- Amphipsalta zelandica (Boisduval, 1835)
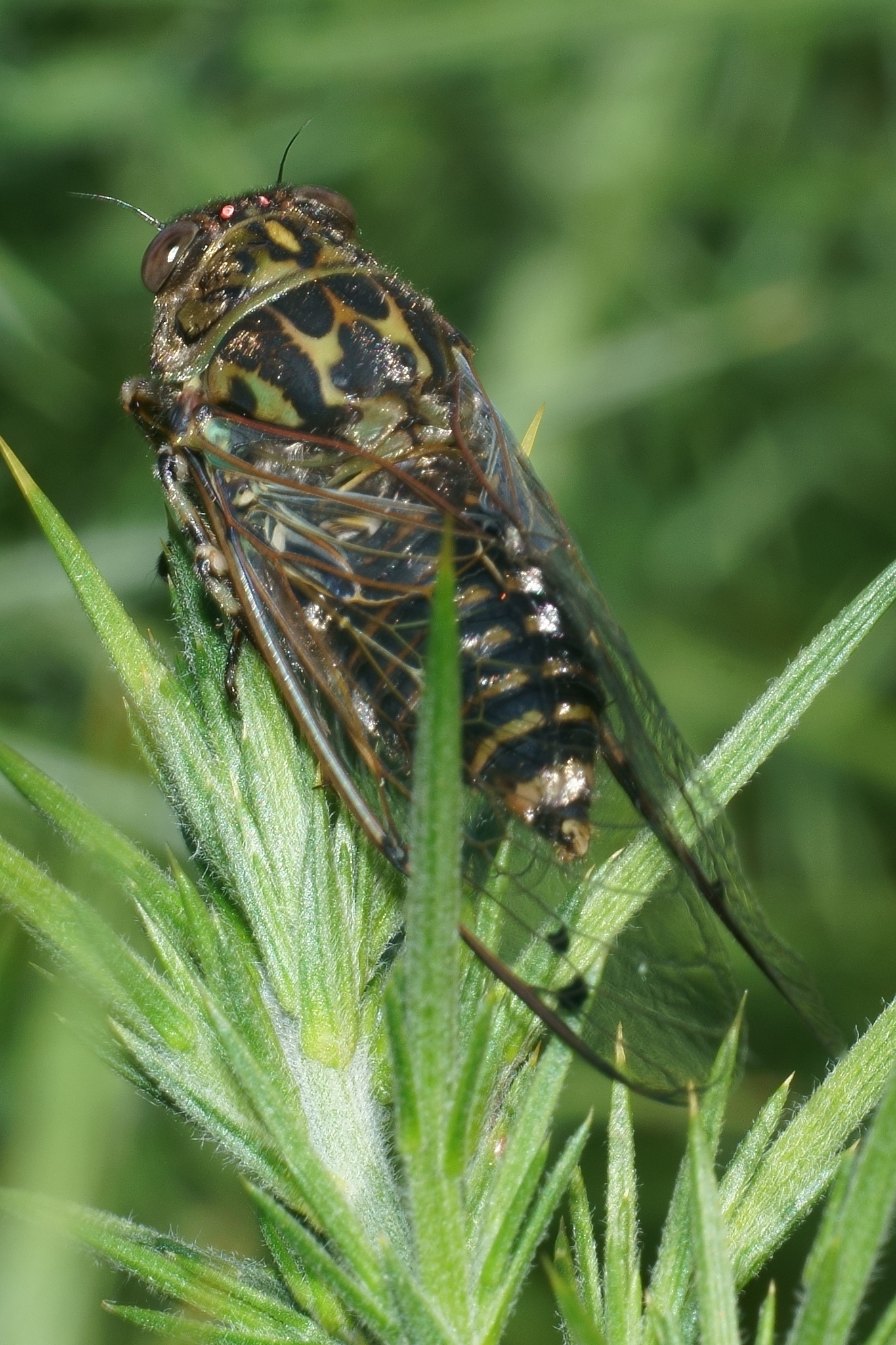
Amphipsalta cingulata

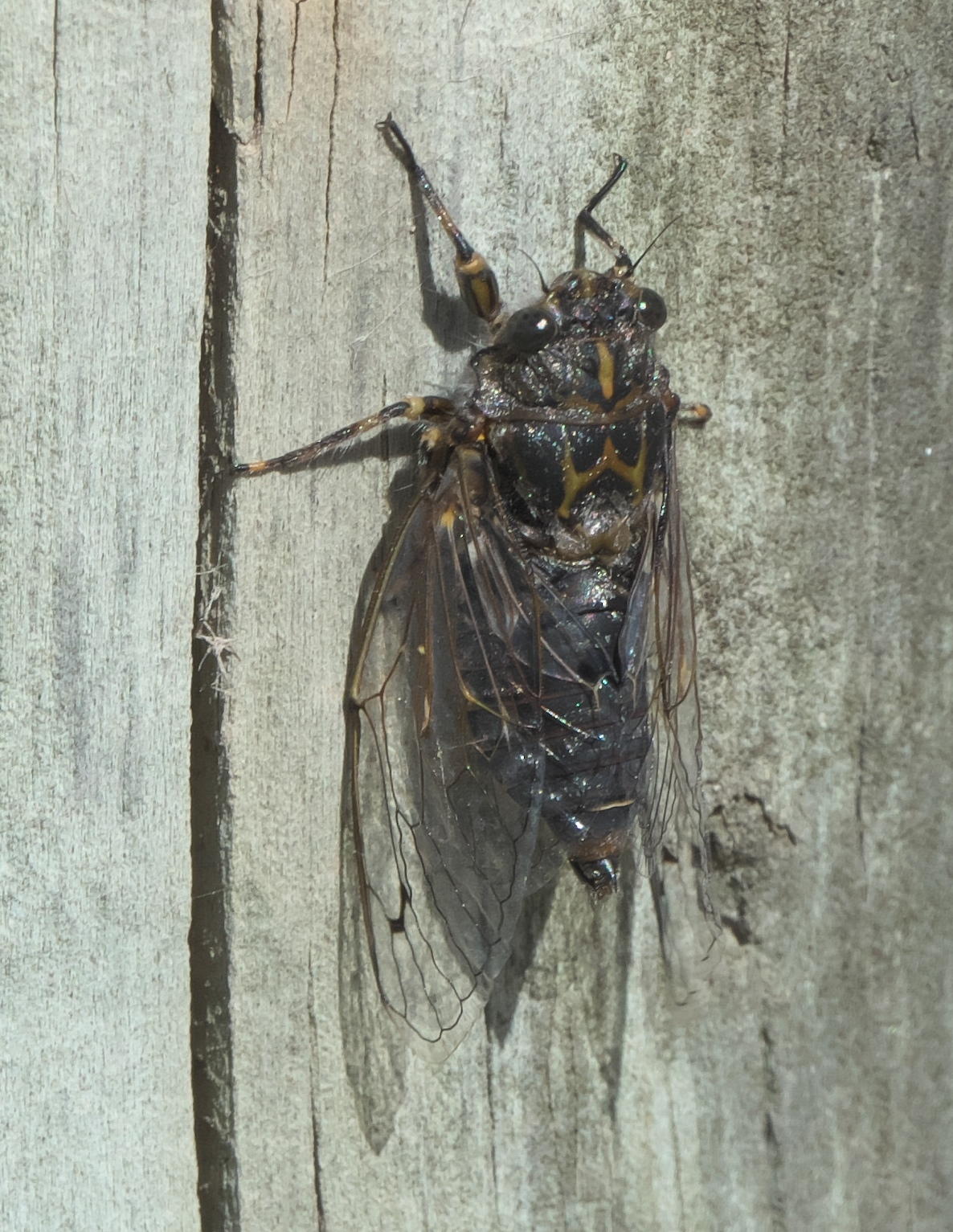
Amphipsalta strepitans

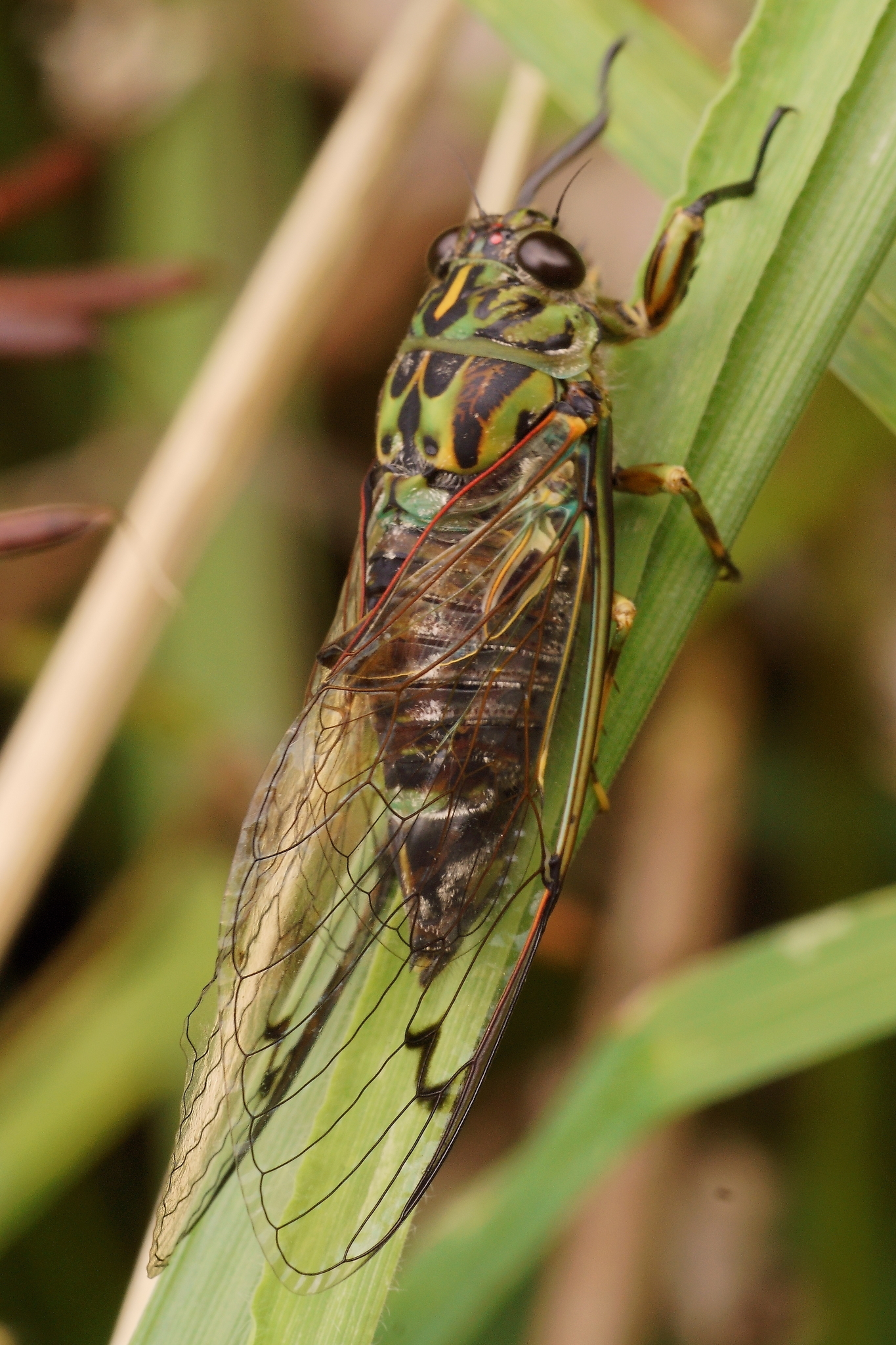
Amphipsalta zelandica
