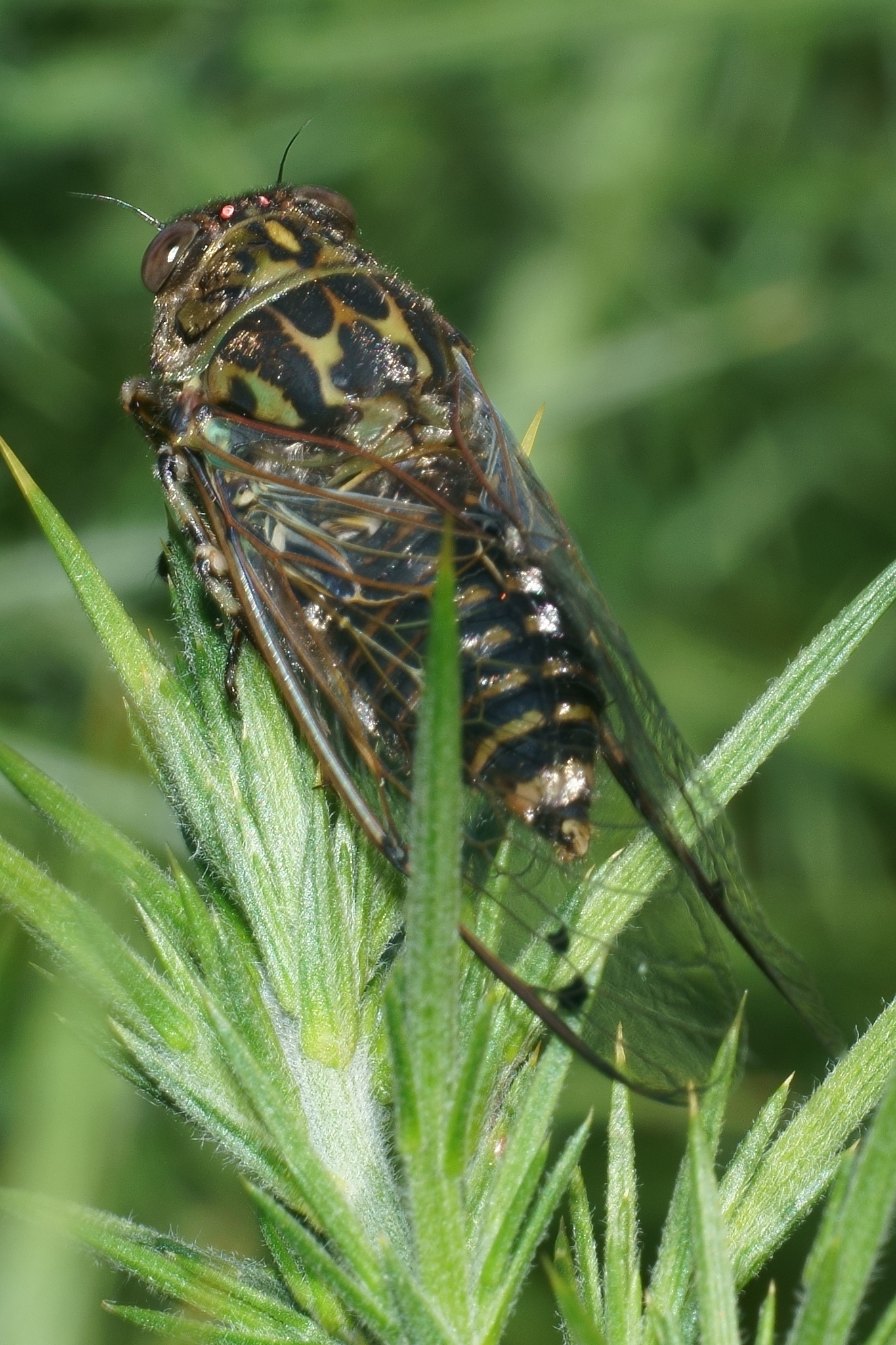

Scientific classification
- Kingdom: Animalia
- Phylum: Arthropoda
- Clade: Pancrustacea
- Class: Insecta
- Order: Hemiptera
- Suborder: Auchenorrhyncha
- Family: Cicadidae
- Genus: Amphipsalta
- Species: A. cingulata

Binomial name
- Amphipsalta cingulata (Fabricius, 1775)

Synonyms
- Tettigonia cingulata Fabricius, 1775; Melampsalta cingulata (Fabricius, 1775); Cicadetta cingulata (Fabricius, 1775)

= Amphipsalta cingulata =

Clapping cicada

Species of true bug

Amphipsalta cingulata, the clapping cicada, is a species of cicada that is endemic to New Zealand.

== Taxonomy ==
This species was first described in 1775 by Johann Christian Fabricius based on four specimens. Fabricius had been given the specimens by naturalist Sir Joseph Banks, who had collected them from New Zealand while on the voyage of HMS Endeavour under then-Lieutenant James Cook. Banks and his assistants are recorded to have collected nine cicada specimens from New Zealand, though neither he nor Cook mention the insects in their diaries.

In 1921 the species was transferred to the genus Melampsalta and then to Cicadetta in 1963. In 1969 the species was reclassified into a new genus, Amphipsalta, by John Stweart Dugdale and Charles Alexander Fleming. The pair also designated the male first syntype from Banks' collection a lectotype.

== Distribution ==
This species is endemic to New Zealand and is found only in the North Island.
