= Forecast model =

A forecast model or forecasting model may refer to

- the mathematical model used in forecasting, see Forecasting#Categories_of_forecasting_methods
- the specific, management-oriented FORECAST forecasting model
