= National Forest Act =

The National Forest Act, the name of several United States federal laws, may refer to:

- Forest Reserve Act of 1891, which established the U.S. National forests
- Forest Management Act, United States statute in 1897
- National Forest Management Act of 1976, which addresses the management of renewable resources on national forest lands
- Caribbean National Forest Act of 2005, Public Law 109-118, which designates certain National Forest System land in the Commonwealth of Puerto Rico as components of the National Wilderness Preservation
