= Law of Maximum =

The Law of Maximum also known as Law of the Maximum is a principle developed by Arthur Wallace which states that total growth of a crop or a plant is proportional to about 70 growth factors. Growth will not be greater than the aggregate values of the growth factors. Without the correction of the limiting growth factors, nutrients, waters and other inputs are not fully or judicially used resulting in wasted resources.

== Applications ==
The factors range from 0 for no growth to 1 for maximum growth. Actual growth is calculated by the total multiplication of each growth factor. For example, if three factors had a value of 0.5, the actual growth would be:

0.5 × 0.5 × 0.5 = 0.125, which is 12.5% of optimum.

If each of the three factors had a value of 0.9 the actual growth would be:

0.9 × 0.9 × 0.9 = 0.729, which is 72.9% of optimum.

Hence the need to achieve maximal value for each factor is critical in order to obtain maximal growth.

== Demonstrations of "Law of the Maximum" ==
The following demonstrates the Law of the Maximum. For the various crops listed below, one, two or three factors were limiting while all the other factors were 1. When two or three factors were simultaneously limiting, predicted growth of the two or three factors was similar to the actual growth when the two or three factors were limits individually and then multiplied together.

	Percent of Optimum growth (Measured growth)	predicted growth (calculated growth)
Soybeans		
Low phosphorus	83%	
Low nitrogen	71%	
Both low phosphorus	actual result 57%	59% (83% x 71%)
and low nitrogen		
Wheat		
Low moisture	66%	
Low nitrogen	27%	
Both low moisture	actual 18%	18% (66% x 27%)
and low nitrogen		
Bush beans		
Nickel addition	42%	
Copper addition	71%	
Vanadium addition	39%	
All 3 metals	actual 10%	11% (42% x 70% x 39%)
Tomato		
Presence of insects	37%	
Nutrient deficiencies	78%	
Both presence of insects and nutrient deficiencies	actual 29%	29% (37% x 78%)
Tomato – poor physical soil conditions		
Correction with organic matter	43%	
Correction with P.A.M.	82%	
No corrections	33%	18% (66% x 27%)
Corrections with both organic matter and P.A.M.	100%	

=== Growth Factors ===
==== A. Adequacy of Nutrients ====
1. Nitrogen
2. Phosphorus
3. Potassium
4. Calcium
5. Magnesium
6. Sulfur
7. Iron
8. Zinc
9. Manganese
10. Copper
11. Boron
12. Chlorine
13. Cobalt
14. Sodium
15. Nickel

==== B. Non-nutrient elements and nutrients excesses that cause toxicities (stresses) ====
1. Nickel
2. Cadmium
3. Nickel
4. Copper
5. Boron
6. Sodium chloride
7. Aluminium
8. Bicarbonate
9. others

==== C. Interactions of the nutrients ====
1. Cation ratios (metals)
2. Carbon:Nitrogen ratio
3. recycling available soil
4. ratios of heavy metals
5. ratios of all the nutrients
6. Nitrate vs ammoniacal nitrogen

==== D. Soil Conditioning requirement and physical processes ====
1. Low pH (soluble Al)
2. high pH
3. salinity, EC (electrical conductivity) either too low or too high,
4. ratios of sand vs. silt vs. clay
5. presence of rocks
6. soil organic matter
7. soil aeration
8. limestone
9. soil moisture conditions (frequency of rain or irrigation)
10. depth to water table
11. other subsoil conditions
12. earthworms
13. cation exchange capacity
14. soil erosion (dust and water)
15. redox, soil crusting
16. structures of soil that give aeration and water penetration
17. fixation of nutrients by soil
18. hydrophobic conditions
19. other aspects of soil quality, slope and topography of lands

==== E. Additional biology ====
1. Favorable and unfavorable microorganisms
2. Mycorrhizae
3. Diseases
4. Insects
5. Weeds
6. other macro organisms
7. and anaerobic decomposition products

==== F. Weather factors ====
1. Intensity, amount, frequency of rain events
2. Wind
3. Hail
4. Snow
5. day and night temperature
6. times of freezing, humidity
7. light hours and percent of light saturation (cloud cover)
8. photoperiods
9. air pollution

==== G. Management ====
1. Crop rotations
2. timing of operations
3. choice of tillage
4. use of appropriate cultivars and varieties
5. irrigation
6. fertilizer distribution
7. use of soil conditioners to correct problems
