= New Zealand Arboricultural Association =

Non-profit organisation for arboriculture within New Zealand

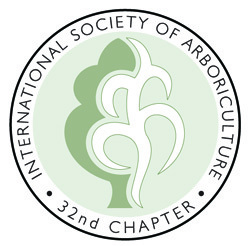
Logo of NZ Arb

The New Zealand Arboricultural Association (NZ Arb) is a national, non-profit organisation for arboriculture within New Zealand.

The association was formed in 1989, representing professional and non-professional people in the arboricultural industry in New Zealand. Its mission statement is: "Through research, technology, and education, promote the professional practice of arboriculture and foster a greater public awareness of the benefits of trees."

NZ Arb has over 200 members - consisting of individuals, organisations and interested bodies.

In 1996, NZ Arb joined the International Society of Arboriculture (ISA) to become its 32nd Chapter.

Every year, NZ Arb holds an annual conference with national and international speakers, normally held in conjunction with the NTCC. Also, throughout each year, several technical seminars or workshops are held, as well as social events and field trips.

The Association manages regional Tree Climbing Competitions (TCCs), culminating in the National Tree Climbing Championship (NTCC) - the respective Men's and Women's champions go on to represent New Zealand at the international event (ITCC) run by the ISA.

The Association manages an Approved Contractor Scheme (ACS). It is also in the process of organising an Arboricultural Consultants Group (ACG).
