= Forests Act 1949 =

Act of Parliament in New Zealand

Forests Act

New Zealand Parliament
- Long title: An Act to consolidate and amend the law relating to forestry
- Royal assent: 11 October 1949

Legislative history
- Passed: 1949
- Status: Current legislation

The Forests Act is an Act of Parliament passed in New Zealand in 1949. The Act is administered in the Ministry for Primary Industries.

== See also ==
- Forestry in New Zealand
