= FORECAST (model) =

FORECAST is a management-oriented, stand-level, forest-growth and ecosystem-dynamics model. The model was designed to accommodate a wide variety of silvicultural and harvesting systems and natural disturbance events (e.g., fire, wind, insect epidemics) in order to compare and contrast their effect on forest productivity, stand dynamics, and a series of biophysical indicators of non-timber values.

== Model description ==
Projection of stand growth and ecosystem dynamics is based upon a representation of the rates of key ecological processes regulating the availability of, and competition for, light and nutrient resources (a representation of moisture effects on soil processes, plant physiology and growth, and the consequences of moisture competition is being added). The rates of these processes are calculated from a combination of historical bioassay data (such as biomass accumulation in plant components and changes in stand density over time) and measures of certain ecosystem variables (including decomposition rates, photosynthetic saturation curves, and plant tissue nutrient concentrations) by relating ‘biologically active’ biomass components (foliage and small roots) to calculated values of nutrient uptake, the capture of light energy, and net primary production. Using this ‘internal calibration’ or hybrid approach, the model generates a suite of growth properties for each tree and understory plant species that is to be represented in a subsequent simulation. These growth properties are used to model growth as a function of resource availability and competition. They include (but are not limited to): (1) photosynthetic efficiency per unit foliage biomass and its nitrogen content based on relationships between foliage nitrogen, simulated self-shading, and net primary productivity after accounting for litterfall and mortality; (2) nutrient uptake requirements based on rates of biomass accumulation and literature- or field-based measures of nutrient concentrations in different biomass components on sites of different nutritional quality (i.e. fertility); (3) light-related measures of tree and branch mortality derived from stand density and live canopy height input data in combination with simulated vertical light profiles. Light levels at which mortality of branches and individual trees occur are estimated for each species. Many of FORECAST's calculations are made at the stand level, but the model includes a sub-model which disaggregates stand-level productivity into the growth of individual stems with user-supplied information on stem size distributions at different stand ages. Top height and DBH are calculated for each stem and used in a taper function to calculate total and individual gross and merchantable volumes. Snags and logs are created in the model from natural stand self-thinning (mainly due to light competition) and from different types of user-defined disturbance events such as insect/disease-induced mortality, windthrow, non-commercial thinning and stand harvesting. Snag fall rates and log-decomposition are simulated using species-specific and tree-size-specific decay parameters derived from the literature, expert opinion, or field measurements.

== The process of model application ==
FORECAST has four stages in its application: 1) data assembly and input verification, 2) establishing the ecosystem condition for the beginning of a simulation run (by simulating the known or assumed history of the site), 3) defining a management and/or natural disturbance regime, and 4) simulating this regime and analyzing model output. The first two stages represent model calibration. Calibration data are assembled that describe the accumulation of biomass (above and below-ground components) in trees and minor vegetation for three chronosequences of stands, each one developed under relatively homogeneous site conditions, representing three different nutritional site qualities. Tree biomass and stand self-thinning rate data are often generated from the height, DBH and stand density output of traditional growth and yield models in conjunction with species-specific component biomass allometric equations. To calibrate the nutritional aspects of the model, data describing the concentration of nutrients in the various biomass components are required. FORECAST also requires data on the degree of shading produced by different quantities of foliage and the photosynthetic response of foliage to different light levels (photosynthetic light saturation curves for either average foliage or separately for sun and shade adapted foliage). A comparable but simpler set of data for minor vegetation must be provided if the user wishes to represent this ecosystem component. Lastly, data describing the rates of decomposition of various litter types and soil organic matter are required for the model to simulate nutrient cycling. Simulation of soil leaching losses and certain measures of soil nutrient availability require input data that define cation- and anion-exchange capacity data for organic matter and mineral soil, and sorption-desorption processes. The second aspect of calibration requires running the model in “set-up” mode to establish initial site conditions. The detailed representation of many different litter types and soil organic matter conditions makes it impractical to measure initial litter and soil pools and conditions directly in the field; consequently, the model is used to generate starting conditions.

== Complexity of the model ==
As an ecosystem level model FORECAST offers the user the ability to represent a high degree of complexity in vegetation (multiple species and different life forms), plant community structure (canopy layering as a simple even-age single canopy layer or a complex multi-age, multi canopy) and population, community and ecosystem processes. However, the model can be simplified to any desired level of complexity that matches the user's interests, specific application and data availability. In its simplest form it can be run as a single age cohort, plant monoculture, light competition model. At the other extreme the model can be used to simulate succession and disturbance responses in a complex multi species, multi age cohort ecosystem-level application with population, community and ecosystem processes represented with light, nutrient and moisture effects and their interactions, and the possibility to examine potential climate change effects.

== Model extensions and linkages ==
FORECAST has been extended to a spatially explicit landscape local level (LLEMS), a spatially explicit individual tree model FORCEE, and to an interactive 3-D visualization (CALP Forester), FORECAST has been linked to a variety of landscape-level models such as ATLAS and DYNA-PLAN. The model has been used as the foundation for two educational applications (FORTOON and POSSIBLE FOREST FUTURES)

== Model evaluation ==
FORECAST has been validated against field data for a range of growth and yield and structural variables in: coastal Western Hemlock zone in British Columbia, coastal Douglas-fir forests, and interior mixedwood forests in British Columbia

== History of model application ==
FORECAST model has been applied to a variety of forest types: mixed Douglas-fir and paper birch forest, mixed aspen and white spruce forest, Chinese-fir plantations, coastal Douglas-fir forest.
