= Growth and yield modelling =

Model used in financial management

Growth and yield modelling is a branch of financial management. This method of modelling is also known as the Gordon constant growth model. In this method the cost of equity share capital is found by determining the sum of yield percentage and growth percentage.
