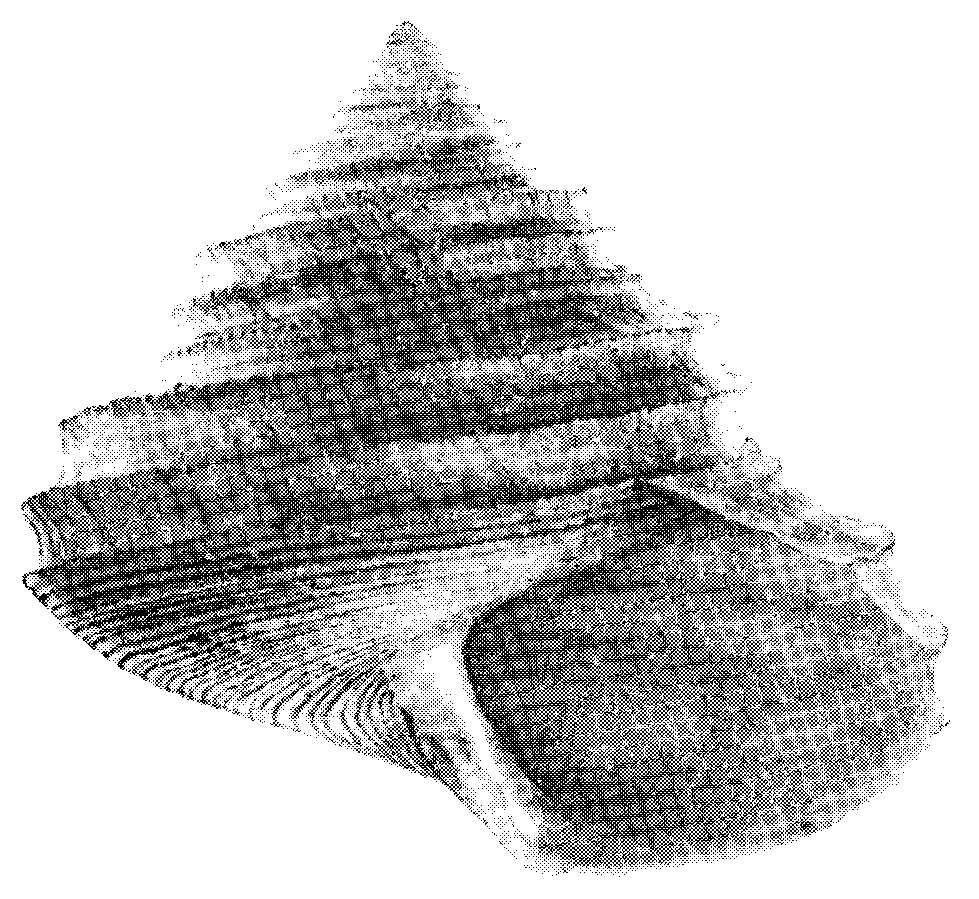
- Apertural view of the shell of Otukaia kiheiziebisu

Scientific classification
- Kingdom: Animalia
- Phylum: Mollusca
- Class: Gastropoda
- Subclass: Vetigastropoda
- Order: Trochida
- Family: Calliostomatidae
- Genus: Otukaia; Ikebe, 1942

Type species
- Calliostoma kiheiziebisu Otuka, 1939

Species
- See text

= Otukaia =

Genus of gastropods

Otukaia is a genus of medium-sized sea snails, which are marine gastropod molluscs in the family Calliostomatidae, the top shells. Otukaia has long been considered a subgenus of Calliostoma and is still treated as such by many taxonomists.

Snails in this genus are characterized by their relatively large, silky-white, thin shell, lacking an umbilicus. Their spiral whorls are flat to slightly convex, with the first three whorls sometimes displaying sculpture that may persist on later whorls. They possess a rachidian radula. These snails can be found worldwide in deep water.

Some authors consider Otukaia Ikebe, 1942, a subgenus of Calliostoma Swainson, 1840.

The (sub)generic name Otukaia honors Japanese malacologist Yanosuke Otuka (1903–1950), who described the type species Calliostoma kiheiziebisu Otuka, 1939.

== Species ==
The following species are accepted in the genus Otukaia:

- Otukaia beringensis Tuskes & R. Clark, 2018
- Otukaia ikukoae Sakurai, 1994
- Otukaia kiheiziebisu (Otuka, 1939)

Species brought into synonymy

- Otukaia blacki Dell, 1956, accepted as Maurea alertae (B. A. Marshall, 1995)
- Otukaia chilena (Rehder, 1971), accepted as Maurea chilena (Rehder, 1971)
- Otukaia crustulum Vilvens & Sellanes, 2006, accepted as Calliotropis crustulum (Vilvens & Sellanes, 2006)
- Otukaia delli McLean & Andrade, 1982, accepted as Maurea delli (McLean & Andrade, 1982)
- Otukaia eltanini Dell, 1990, accepted as Maurea eltanini (Dell, 1990)
- Otukaia rossica (Dall, 1919), accepted as Margarites rossicus Dall, 1919
