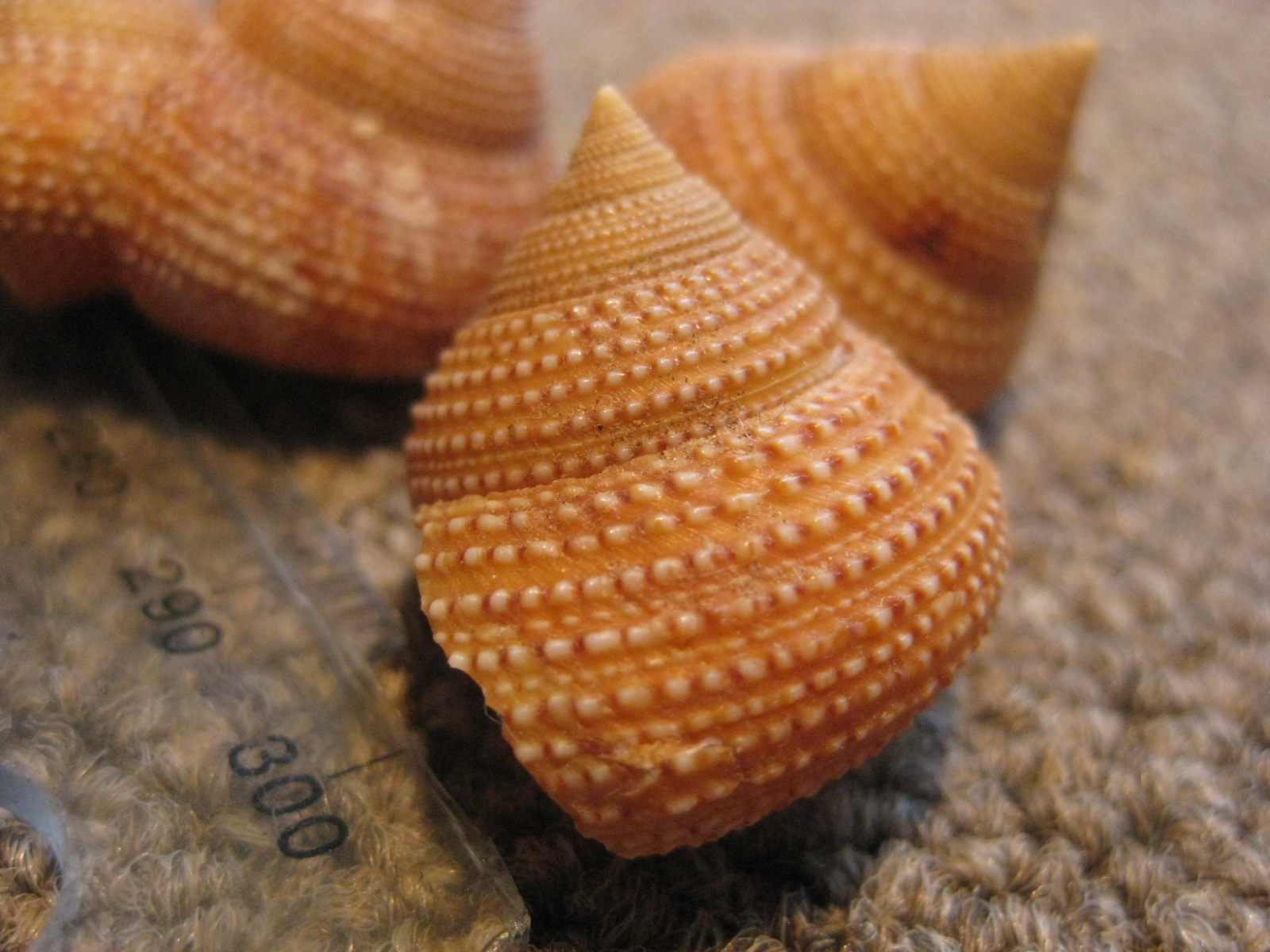

Scientific classification
- Kingdom: Animalia
- Phylum: Mollusca
- Class: Gastropoda
- Subclass: Vetigastropoda
- Order: Trochida
- Family: Calliostomatidae
- Genus: Maurea
- Species: M. granti

Binomial name
- Maurea granti A. W. B. Powell, 1931

Synonyms
- Calliostoma (sensu lato) granti Beu & Maxwell, 1990; Calliostoma (Maurea) granti (Powell, 1931); Calliostoma granti (Powell, 1931); Calliostoma puncttilatum Suter, 1913 (in part); Maurea (Mauriella) granti Fleming, 1966; Maurea (Mauriella) osbornei Fleming. 1966; Maurea (Mucrinops) granti Powell, 1931; Maurea (Mucrinops) punctulata ampla Powell, 1939; Maurea (Mucrinops) punctulata punctulata Powell, 1937 (in part); Maurea blackii [sic] Horikoshi, 1989; Maurea multigemmata Powell, 1976; Maurea punctulata Dell, 1956; Maurea punctulata ampla Powell, 1957; Maurea punctulata punctulata Powell, 1957 (in part); Maurea punctulata multigemmata Powell, 1957; Venustas punctulata (?) n.subsp. Dell, 1950; Venustas punctulata ampla Dell, 1950; Venustas punctulata multigemmata Powell, 1952; Venustas punctulata urbanior Powell, 1955; Zizyphinus punctulatus Hutton, 1880 (in part)

= Maurea granti =

Maurea granti Temporal range: 3.70–Recent Ma

Species of gastropod

Maurea granti, also known as Grant's top shell, is a species of sea snail, a marine gastropod mollusc, in the family Calliostomatidae. Endemic to New Zealand, the species is found offshore up to depths of 360 m (1,180 ft). It is a polymorphic species, with different shell thickness, colour and spiral cord numbers appearing in shallow water and deep water specimens.

== Description ==
In the original description, Powell described the species as follows:

Shell acutely conical, moderately solid, inperforate and subangled at the periphery. Spire one and one-half times height of aperture. Outlines straight. Whorls 104, including typical protoconch. Sculpture fine, consisting of numerous closely spaced beaded spiral cords and interstitial threads, crossed by dense microscopic axial growth striae. Early post-nuclear whorls with three beaded cords, later whorls with six, each interspace having a fine spiral thread, which becomes beaded towards the close of the penultimate whorl. Base with twelve beaded cords, four closely spaced at periphery, the remainder more distant; each with a plain interstitial thread. Periphery angled, but not acutely. Columella oblique, arcuate, rather massive.

The holotype of the species has a height of 34.25 mm (1.348 in), a diameter of 28.5 mm (1.12 in), and a thickness of 2.90 mm (0.114 in), and a spire angle of 62°. The species has a maximum height of 45 mm (1.8 in) and diameter of 42 mm (1.7 in).

The species is polymorphic, differing in shell size, shape and number of spiral cords on the final two whorls. When found in shallow waters, the species tends to have thicker and more darkly pigmented shells with fewer spiral cords, while deep water specimens have thinner and lighter-coloured or white shells with more heavily nodular spiral cords. Transitional forms of shells exist where deep water and shallow water populations overlap or border.

It can be differentiated from M. osbornei due to having a less acute spire, finer sculpture, and by M. osbornei having obsolescent interstitial threads. It can be differentiated from M. punctulata due to having more robuse axial ribs.

== Taxonomy ==
The species was first described by A. W. B. Powell in 1931, using the name Maurea (Mucrinops) granti. He named the species after Whanganui museum director and conchologist Maxwell James Grant Smart. The holotype was collected in January 1931 by Powell near the mouth of the Waihi Stream near Hāwera, South Taranaki. It is held in the collections of Auckland War Memorial Museum. When describing the species in 1931, Powell believed it was a fossil species ancestral to M. osbornei.

In 2016, Maurea was raised to genus level, leading to the species' accepted name in the World Register of Marine Species to become Maurea granti. The New Zealand Organisms Register lists the species' preferred name as Calliostoma granti, and the New Zealand Inventory of Biodiversity (2009) lists the species' preferred name as Calliostoma (Maurea) granti.

== Ecology ==
M. granti primarily feeds on Cnidaria. It is a known host for the slipper snail species Maoricrypta youngi.

== Distribution ==
The species is endemic to New Zealand, found offshore the North Island south of East Cape and Cape Egmont, South Island, Stewart Island, Auckland Islands, Campbell Islands and Chatham Islands at a depth ranging between 0–360 m (0–1,181 ft). Fossils of the species date back to the Waipipian stage of the Pliocene (3.7 million years ago) in New Zealand.

== Gallery ==
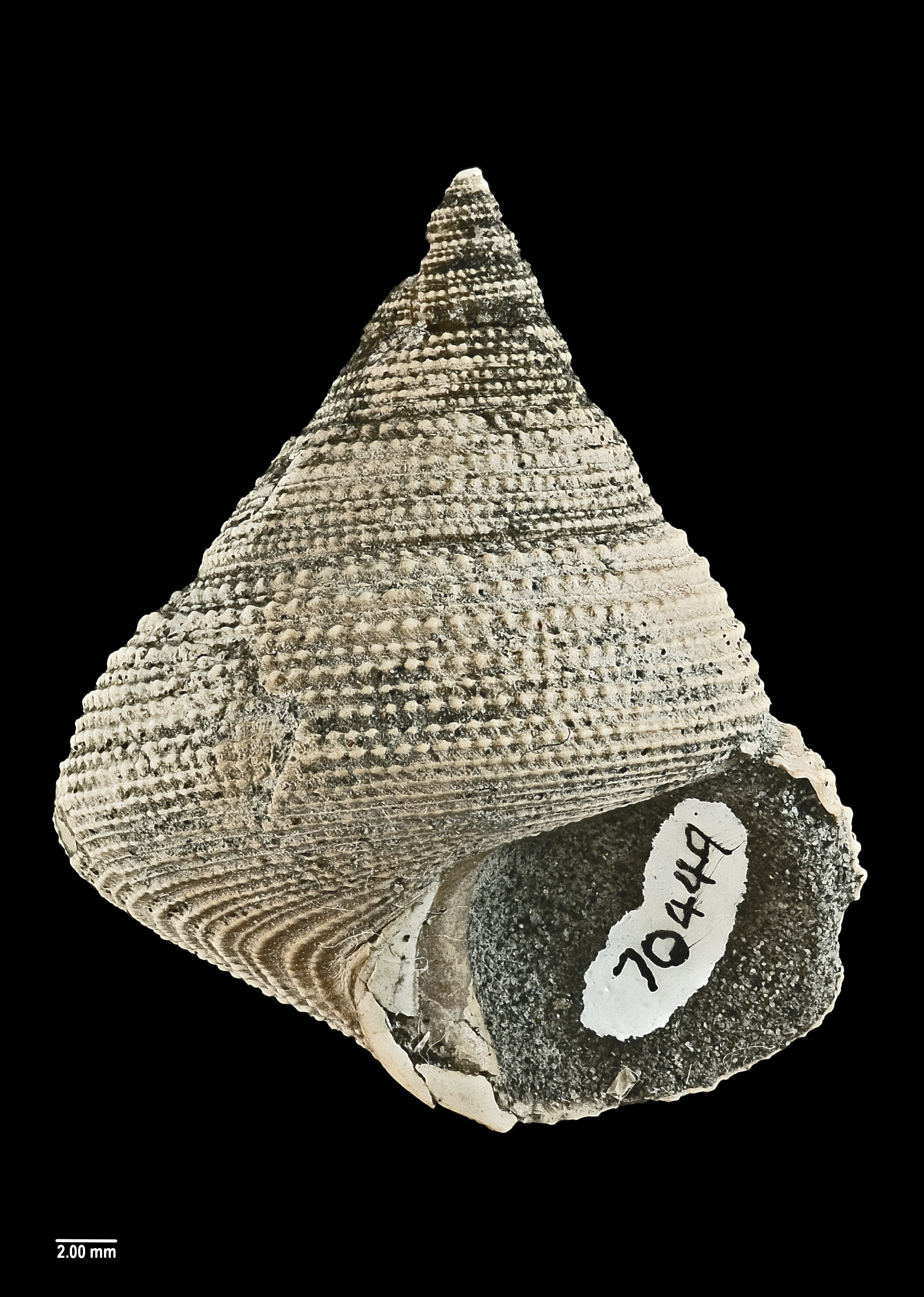
Holotype (front view)

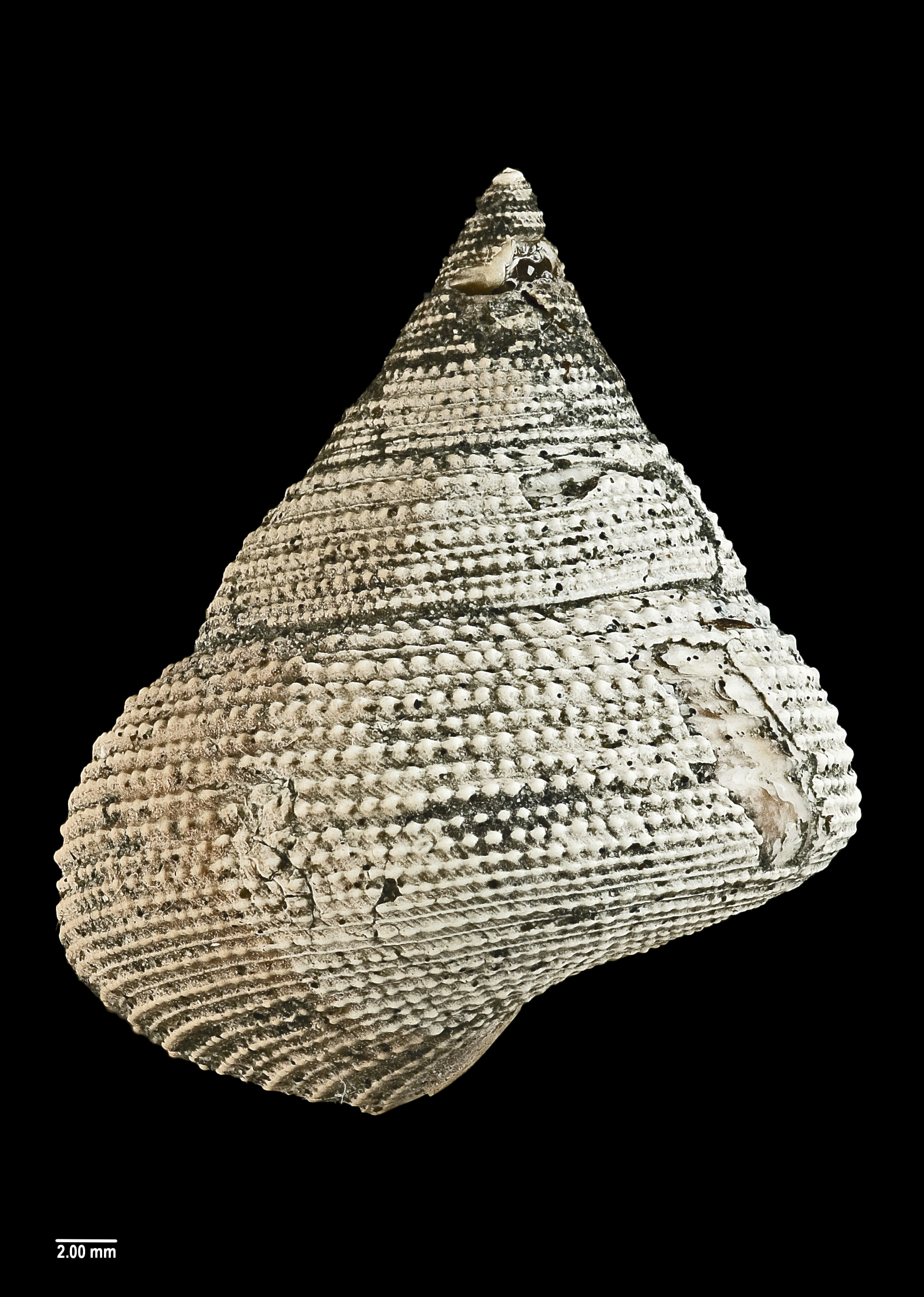
Holotype (reverse view)
