= Venustas =

Scientific classification
- Kingdom: Animalia
- Phylum: Mollusca
- Class: Gastropoda
- Subclass: Vetigastropoda
- Order: Trochida
- Superfamily: Trochoidea
- Family: Calliostomatidae
- Genus: †Venustas; Allan, 1926

Type species
- Calliostoma fragile Finlay, 1923

Genus of gastropods

Venustas is a genus of sea snails, marine gastropod mollusks in the family Calliostomatidae within the superfamily Trochoidea, the top snails, turban snails and their allies.

Venustas Finlay, 1927 is an officially rejected name (ICZN Opinion 479).

== Species ==
- †Venustas fragilis (Finlay, 1923)

Synonyms

- Venustas blacki Powell, 1950: synonym of Calliostoma (Maurea) blacki (Powell, 1950)
- Venustas couperi Vella, 1954: synonym of Calliostoma blacki (Powell, 1950)
- Venustas cunninghami cunninghami Dell, 1950: synonym of Calliostoma (Maurea) selectum (Dillwyn, 1817)
- Venustas cunninghami regifica Finlay, 1927: synonym of Calliostoma (Maurea) selectum (Dillwyn, 1817)
- Venustas cunninghami pagoda Dell, 1950: synonym of Calliostoma (Maurea) selectum (Dillwyn, 1817)
- Venustas foveauxana Dell, 1950: synonym of Calliostoma (Maurea) foveauxanum (Dell, 1950); synonym of Maurea foveauxana (Dell, 1950)
- Venustas megaloprepes Powell, 1955: synonym of Calliostoma (Maurea) megaloprepes (Tomlin, 1948)
- Venustas pellucida pellucida Dell, 1950: synonym of Calliostoma (Maurea) pellucidum (Valenciennes, 1846)
- Venustas pellucida spirata Dell, 1950: synonym of Calliostoma (Maurea) pellucidum (Valenciennes, 1846)
- Venustas punctulata multigemmata Powell, 1952: synonym of Calliostoma granti (Powell, 1931)
- Venustas punctulata punctulata Dell, 1950: synonym of Calliostonia (Maurea) punctulatum (Martyn, 1784)
- Venustas punctulata urbanior Deii, 1950: synonym of Calliostonia (Maurea) punctulatum (Martyn, 1784)
- Venustas spectabile Dell, 1950: synonym of Calliostoma (Maurea) spectabile (A. Adams, 1855)
- Venustas tigris chathamensis Dell, 1950: synonym of Calliostoma (Maurea) tigris (Gmelin, 1791)
- Venustas tigris tigris Dell, 1950: synonym of Calliostoma (Maurea) tigris (Gmelin, 1791)
- Venustas (Mucrinops) osbornei Firilay, 1926: synonym of Calliostoma (Maurea) osbornei Powell, 1926
- Venustas (Mucrinops) punctulata punctulata Finiay. 1926: synonym of Calliostonia (Maurea) punctulatum (Martyn, 1784)
- Venustas (Mucrinops) punctulata urbanior Finlay, 1926: synonym of Calliostonia (Maurea) punctulatum (Martyn, 1784)
- Venustas (Mucrinops) spectabilis Finlay, 1926: synonym of Calliostoma (Maurea) spectabile (A. Adams, 1855)
- Venustas (Venustas) hodgei Finlay, 1926: synonym of Calliostoma (Maurea) selectum (Dillwyn, 1817)
- Venustas (Venustas) cunninghami Finlay, 1926: synonym of Calliostoma (Maurea) selectum (Dillwyn, 1817)
- Venustas (Venustas) pellucida Finlay, 1926: synonym of Calliostoma (Maurea) pellucidum (Valenciennes, 1846)
- Venustas (Venustas) ponderosa Finlay, 1926: synonym of Calliostoma (Maurea) selectum (Dillwyn, 1817)
- Venustas (Venustas) tigris Finlay, 1926: synonym of Calliostoma (Maurea) tigris (Gmelin, 1791)
- Venustas (Venustas) undulala Finlay, 1926: synonym of Calliostoma (Maurea) pellucidum (Valenciennes, 1846)
