= C. eminens =

C. eminens may refer to:

- Calamagrostis eminens, a grass species
- Calliostoma eminens, a sea snail species
