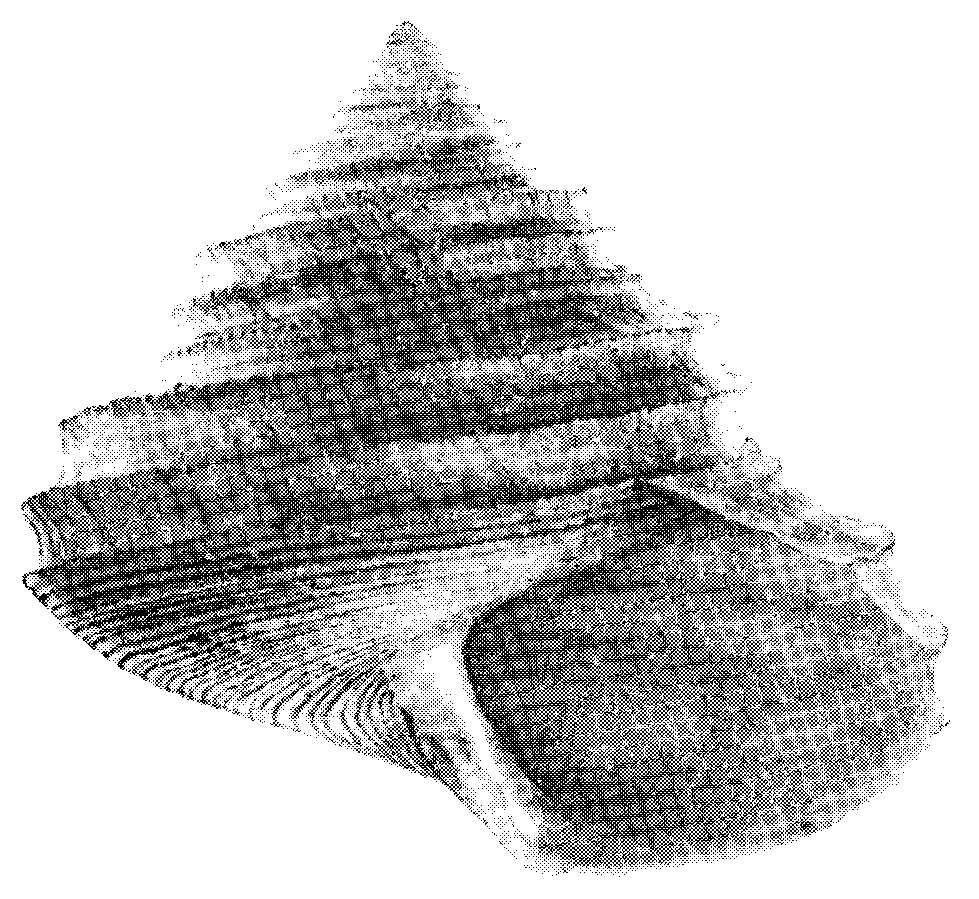
- Drawing of the apertural view of the shell of Otukaia kiheiziebisu

Scientific classification
- Kingdom: Animalia
- Phylum: Mollusca
- Class: Gastropoda
- Subclass: Vetigastropoda
- Order: Trochida
- Family: Calliostomatidae
- Genus: Otukaia
- Species: O. kiheiziebisu

Binomial name
- Otukaia kiheiziebisu (Otuka, 1939à

Synonyms
- Calliostoma kiheiziebisu Otuka, 1939; Calliostoma (Otukaia) kiheiziebisu Otuka, 1939

= Otukaia kiheiziebisu =

Species of gastropod

Otukaia kiheiziebisu is a species of sea snail, a marine gastropod mollusk in the family Calliostomatidae.

The type specimens were collected by amateur conchologist Mr. Kiheizi Oosima in 1938. The specific name kiheiziebisu is in honour of him. The new species was originally described as Calliostoma kiheiziebisu by the Japanese malacologist Yanosuke Otuka (1903-1950) in 1939.

Otukaia kiheiziebisu is the type species of the genus Otukaia Ikeba, 1942.

Some authors recognize Otukaia as a separate genus.

== Description ==
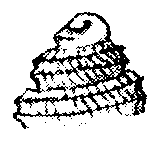
Drawing of the apex of the shell of Otukaia kiheiziebisu.

The shell is large, conical, thin, semitransparent, pale cinnamon pink in colour with pearly lustre. The shell has 8.5 whorls. One and a half coils of nuclear portion of whorls are rounded in outline, smooth, polished on the surface. Subsequent whorls are sculptured with four strong, beaded spiral keels and very fine lines, which are only visible under a magnifying lens, and with fine oblique lines of growth. The uppermost spiral keel is situated on the subsutural area. The second and the third spiral keels divide the surface of the whorl into three parts with unequal intervals; the uppermost part is the broadest, having angle of about 120° to the middle one, weakly sculptured with a thread and many exceedingly fine spiral lines near the body whorl. The lowest one is the narrowest of them all. The lowest spiral keel is concealed with succeeding whorl. The number of beads on the uppermost spiral keel is ca 165-177 on the last whorl, ca 130 on the penultimate whorl, ca 80 on the sixth whorl, ca 50 on the fifth whorl, ca 42 on the fourth whorl, ca 28 on the third whorl and ca 19 on the second whorl.

The base is sculptured with about 40 spiral threads. The inner surface is smooth, pearly lustrous, ornamented with four spiral dull grooves which correspond to the outer keels respectively. The callus extends over the umbilicus to occlude it completely, giving the shape of an oblique columellar end.

The height of the shell is 30 mm. The width of the shell is 33 mm.

The operculum is small, round, horny, thin, translucent, marked with a fine spiral line which coils about 13 in number. The diameter of the operculum is about 13 mm.

Otukaia kiheiziebisu is very similar to Calliostoma kounjiana Yokoyama in general outline, and in sculpture on the surface, but it differs from Calliostoma kounjiana in having the spirally sculptured base and the beaded spiral keels, while Calliostoma kounjiana is quite smooth both on spiral keel and the base. Any other species reported from the northern Pacific has much thicker shell and more complicated sculptures than Otukaia kiheiziebisu.

== Distribution ==
The type locality is Kasimanada 600 m in depth, off the east coast of Ibaraki Prefecture, Japan.
