= W.R.B. Oliver =

New Zealand naturalist, ornithologist, malacologist and museum curator (1883–1957)

Walter Oliver
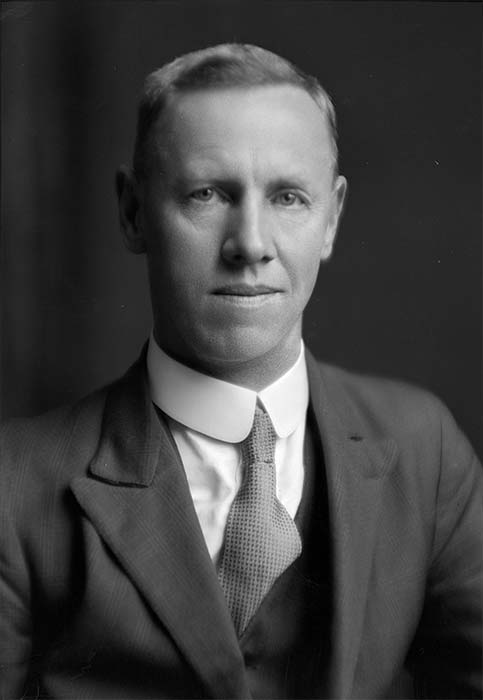
- Oliver in 1934
- Died: May 16, 1957 (aged 93)
- Citizenship: New Zealander
- Occupations: Naturalist, ornithologist, malacologist and museum curator
- Known for: Snares penguin, Calliostoma waikanae and Shepherd's beaked whale
- Honours: King George V Silver Jubilee Medal; Oligosoma oliveri was named after him

Walter Reginald Brook Oliver (7 September 1883 – 16 May 1957)—W.R.B. Oliver professionally and Reginald Oliver with his family—was a New Zealand naturalist, ornithologist, malacologist, and museum curator.

== Biography ==
Born in Launceston, Tasmania, Oliver, emigrated with his family to New Zealand in 1896, settling in Tauranga. Having already developed an interest in nature during his childhood, he systematically recorded natural observations throughout much of his life, including joining other naturalists on an expedition to the Kermadec Islands in 1908.

In 1910, Oliver became a member of the Royal Australasian Ornithologists Union (RAOU) for which body he served as branch secretary for New Zealand from 1914 to his death in 1957, a period of office of 43 years. During this period, he also served as RAOU vice-president from 1942 to 1943, and as president from 1943 to 1944.

Oliver was appointed director of the Dominion Museum in 1928, and in 1930, he published the seminal guide New Zealand Birds, which was updated and expanded in 1955. The guide contained many colour plates by Lily Attey Daff, although she was not credited with the work. Oliver retired from the position of director in 1946. He was one of the botanists on the 1949 New Zealand American Fiordland Expedition.

Oliver was active in numerous scientific societies, and was a prolific contributor to New Zealand scientific literature over his career. He was government representative on the Council of the Royal Society of New Zealand for many years, its president from 1952 to 1954, and editor of its Transactions from 1948 to 1954. Oliver went by "Reginald" with family and friends, and "Dr. Oliver" with all others.

Oliver described several species new to science, including:

- Snares penguin
- Calliostoma waikanae, a sea snail
- Shepherd's beaked whale

A species of New Zealand lizard, Oligosoma oliveri, is named in his honour.

In 1935, Oliver was awarded the King George V Silver Jubilee Medal. In 1953, he was awarded the Queen Elizabeth II Coronation Medal.

The standard author abbreviation W.R.B.Oliv. is used to indicate this person as the author when citing a botanical name.
