= C. tigris =

C. tigris may refer to:

- Calliostoma tigris, a snail species endemic to New Zealand
- Calumma tigris, a chameleon species
- Cnemidophorus tigris, a lizard species
- Crotalus tigris, a pitviper species
- Cypraea tigris, a cowry species

== See also ==
- Tigris (disambiguation)
