= Conquiliologistas do Brasil =

Conquiliologistas do Brasil (Portuguese: Conchologists of Brazil) is an association created on September 19, 1989, in São Paulo, Brazil, with the main goal of spreading and increasing conchology, the study of mollusc shells.

The association publishes the magazine Siratus, the monthly bulletin Calliostoma and the biannual peer-reviewed scientific journal Strombus, and maintains a library of more than 1500 scientific papers.

== See also ==
- Conchology § Organizations
