= Maurea benthicola =

Conservation status
- Naturally Uncommon (NZ TCS)

Scientific classification
- Kingdom: Animalia
- Phylum: Mollusca
- Class: Gastropoda
- Subclass: Vetigastropoda
- Order: Trochida
- Superfamily: Trochoidea
- Family: Calliostomatidae
- Genus: Maurea
- Species: M. benthicola

Binomial name
- Maurea benthicola (Dell, 1950)

Synonyms
- Calliostoma (Maurea) benthicola (Dell, 1950); Calliostoma benthicola (Dell, 1950); Venustas benthicola Dell, 1950

Species of gastropod

Maurea benthicola is a species of sea snail, a marine gastropod mollusc, in the family Calliostomatidae within the superfamily Trochoidea, the top snails, turban snails and their allies.
