= Maurea gracilis =

Scientific classification
- Kingdom: Animalia
- Phylum: Mollusca
- Class: Gastropoda
- Subclass: Vetigastropoda
- Order: Trochida
- Superfamily: Trochoidea
- Family: Calliostomatidae
- Genus: Maurea
- Species: †M. gracilis

Binomial name
- †Maurea gracilis (P. Marshall, 1918)

Synonyms
- Calliostoma (Maurea) gracile P. Marshall, 1918; Calliostoma gracile P. Marshall, 1918

Extinct species of gastropod

Maurea gracilis is an extinct species of sea snail, a marine gastropod mollusk, in the family Calliostomatidae within the superfamily Trochoidea, the top snails, turban snails and their allies.
