= Maurea barbara =

Scientific classification
- Kingdom: Animalia
- Phylum: Mollusca
- Class: Gastropoda
- Subclass: Vetigastropoda
- Order: Trochida
- Superfamily: Trochoidea
- Family: Calliostomatidae
- Genus: Maurea
- Species: †M. barbara

Binomial name
- †Maurea barbara Marwick, 1942

Synonyms
- Calliostoma (Maurea) barbara (Marwick, 1942); Calliostoma barbara (Marwick, 1942)

Extinct species of gastropod

Maurea barbara is an extinct species of sea snail, a marine gastropod mollusk, in the family Calliostomatidae within the superfamily Trochoidea, the top snails, turban snails and their allies.
