= Maurea spectabilis =

Scientific classification
- Kingdom: Animalia
- Phylum: Mollusca
- Class: Gastropoda
- Subclass: Vetigastropoda
- Order: Trochida
- Superfamily: Trochoidea
- Family: Calliostomatidae
- Genus: Maurea
- Species: M. spectabilis

Binomial name
- Maurea spectabilis (A. Adams, 1855)

Synonyms
- Calliostoma (Maurea) spectabile (A. Adams, 1855); Calliostoma spectabile (A. Adams, 1855); Ziziphinus spectabilis A. Adams, 1855; Zizyphinus spectabilis A. Adams, 1855

Species of gastropod

Maurea spectabilis is a species of sea snail, a marine gastropod mollusk, in the family Calliostomatidae within the superfamily Trochoidea, the top snails, turban snails and their allies.
