= Maurea regalis =

Scientific classification
- Kingdom: Animalia
- Phylum: Mollusca
- Class: Gastropoda
- Subclass: Vetigastropoda
- Order: Trochida
- Superfamily: Trochoidea
- Family: Calliostomatidae
- Genus: Maurea
- Species: M. regalis

Binomial name
- Maurea regalis (B. A. Marshall, 1995)

Synonyms
- Calliostoma (Maurea) regale B. A. Marshall, 1995; Calliostoma regale B. A. Marshall, 1995

Species of gastropod

Maurea regalis is a species of sea snail, a marine gastropod mollusk, in the family Calliostomatidae within the superfamily Trochoidea, the top snails, turban snails and their allies.
