= Maurea jamiesoni =

Conservation status
- Naturally Uncommon (NZ TCS)

Scientific classification
- Kingdom: Animalia
- Phylum: Mollusca
- Class: Gastropoda
- Subclass: Vetigastropoda
- Order: Trochida
- Superfamily: Trochoidea
- Family: Calliostomatidae
- Genus: Maurea
- Species: M. jamiesoni

Binomial name
- Maurea jamiesoni (B. A. Marshall, 1995)

Synonyms
- Calliostoma (Maurea) jamiesoni B. A. Marshall, 1995; Calliostoma jamiesoni B. A. Marshall, 1995

Species of gastropod

Maurea jamiesoni is a species of sea snail, a marine gastropod mollusc, in the family Calliostomatidae within the superfamily Trochoidea, the top snails, turban snails and their allies.
