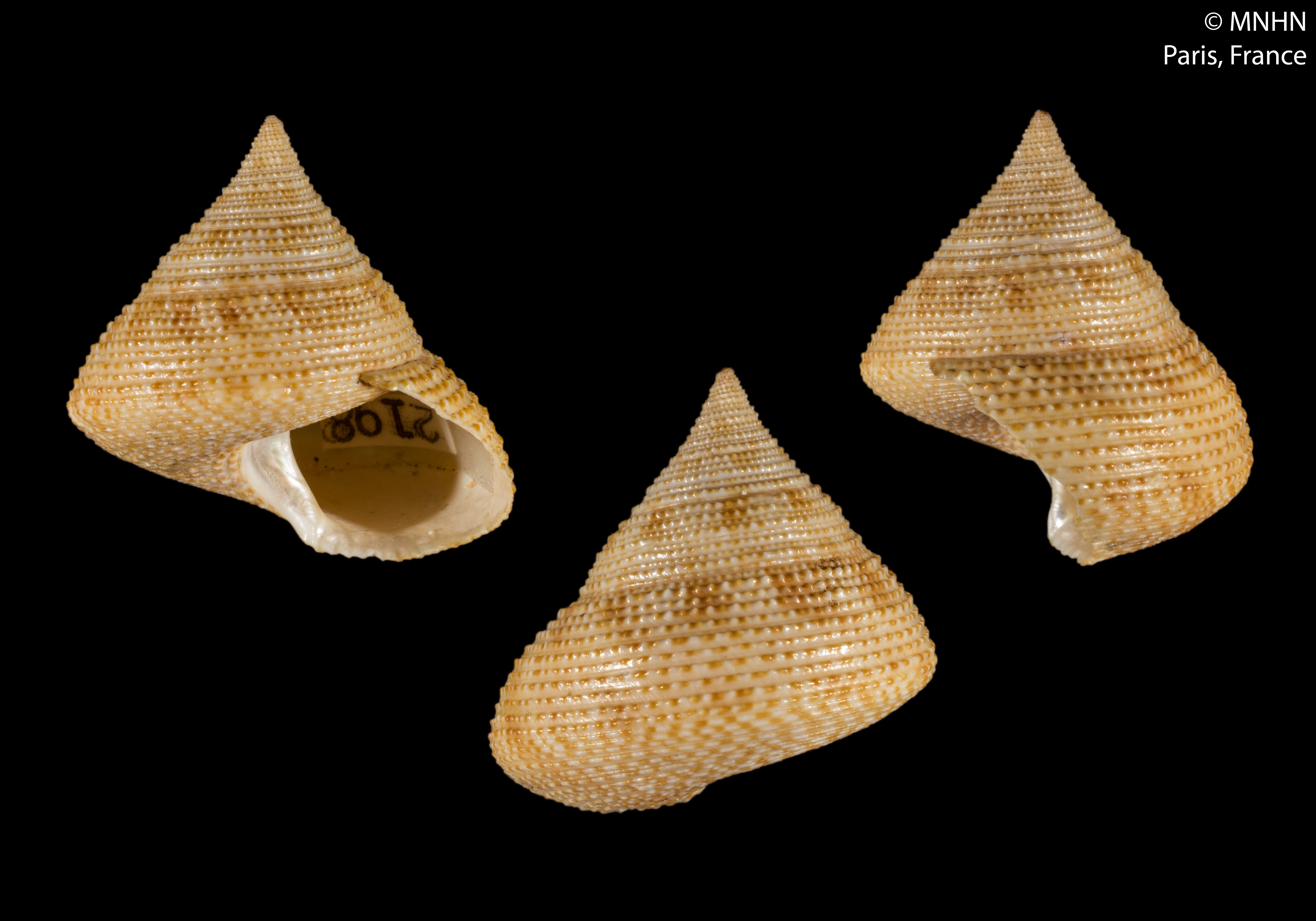
- Shell of Maurea pellucida (lectotype at MNHN, Paris)

Scientific classification
- Kingdom: Animalia
- Phylum: Mollusca
- Class: Gastropoda
- Subclass: Vetigastropoda
- Order: Trochida
- Superfamily: Trochoidea
- Family: Calliostomatidae
- Genus: Maurea; Oliver, 1926

Type species
- Trochus tigris Gmelin, 1791

Synonyms
- Alertalex Dell, 1956; Calliostoma (Calliotropis) Oliver, 1926; Calliostoma (Maurea) Oliver, 1926; Calliostoma (Mauriella) W. R. B. Oliver, 1926; Calliotropis Oliver, 1926; Calotropis Thiele, 1929; Maurea (Alertalex) Dell, 1956; Maurea (Mucrinops) Finlay, 1926; Mauriella Oliver, 1926; Mucrinops Finlay, 1926; Venustas Finlay, 1926; Venustas (Mucrinops) Finlay, 1926

= Maurea =

Genus of gastropods

Maurea is a genus of sea snails, marine gastropod mollusks, in the family Calliostomatidae within the superfamily Trochoidea, the top snails, turban snails and their allies.

== Species ==
Species within the genus Maurea include:

- † Maurea acutangula Suter, 1917
- Maurea alertae B. A. Marshall, 1995
- Maurea antipodensis B. A. Marshall, 1995
- Maurea aupouriana B. A. Marshall, 1995
- † Maurea barbara Marwick, 1942
- Maurea benthicola Dell, 1950
- Maurea blacki Powell, 1950
- Maurea chilena Rehder, 1971
- † Maurea correlata C. A. Fleming, 1943
- Maurea delli McLean & Andrade, 1982
- Maurea eltanini Dell, 1990
- Maurea eminens B. A. Marshall, 1995
- † Maurea filifera Suter, 1917
- † Maurea finlayi Marwick, 1928
- Maurea foveauxana Dell, 1950
- † Maurea fragilis Finlay, 1923
- Maurea gibbsorum B. A. Marshall, 1995
- † Maurea gracilis P. Marshall, 1918
- Maurea granti Powell, 1931
- Maurea jamiesoni B. A. Marshall, 1995
- Maurea maui B. A. Marshall, 1995
- Maurea megaloprepes Tomlin, 1948
- Maurea muriellae Vilvens, 2001
- † Maurea nukumaruensis Laws, 1930
- Maurea osbornei Powell, 1926
- Maurea pellucida Valenciennes, 1846
- Maurea penniketi B. A. Marshall, 1995
- Maurea punctulata Martyn, 1784
- Maurea regalis B. A. Marshall, 1995
- Maurea selecta Dillwyn, 1817
- Maurea simulans B. A. Marshall, 1994
- Maurea spectabilis A. Adams, 1855
- † Maurea suteri Finlay, 1923
- Maurea tigris Gmelin, 1791
- Maurea turnerarum Powell, 1964
- † Maurea waiareka Laws, 1935
- Maurea waikanae Oliver, 1926
- † Maurea waiparaensis Suter, 1917
