= Conchology =

Study of mollusc shells

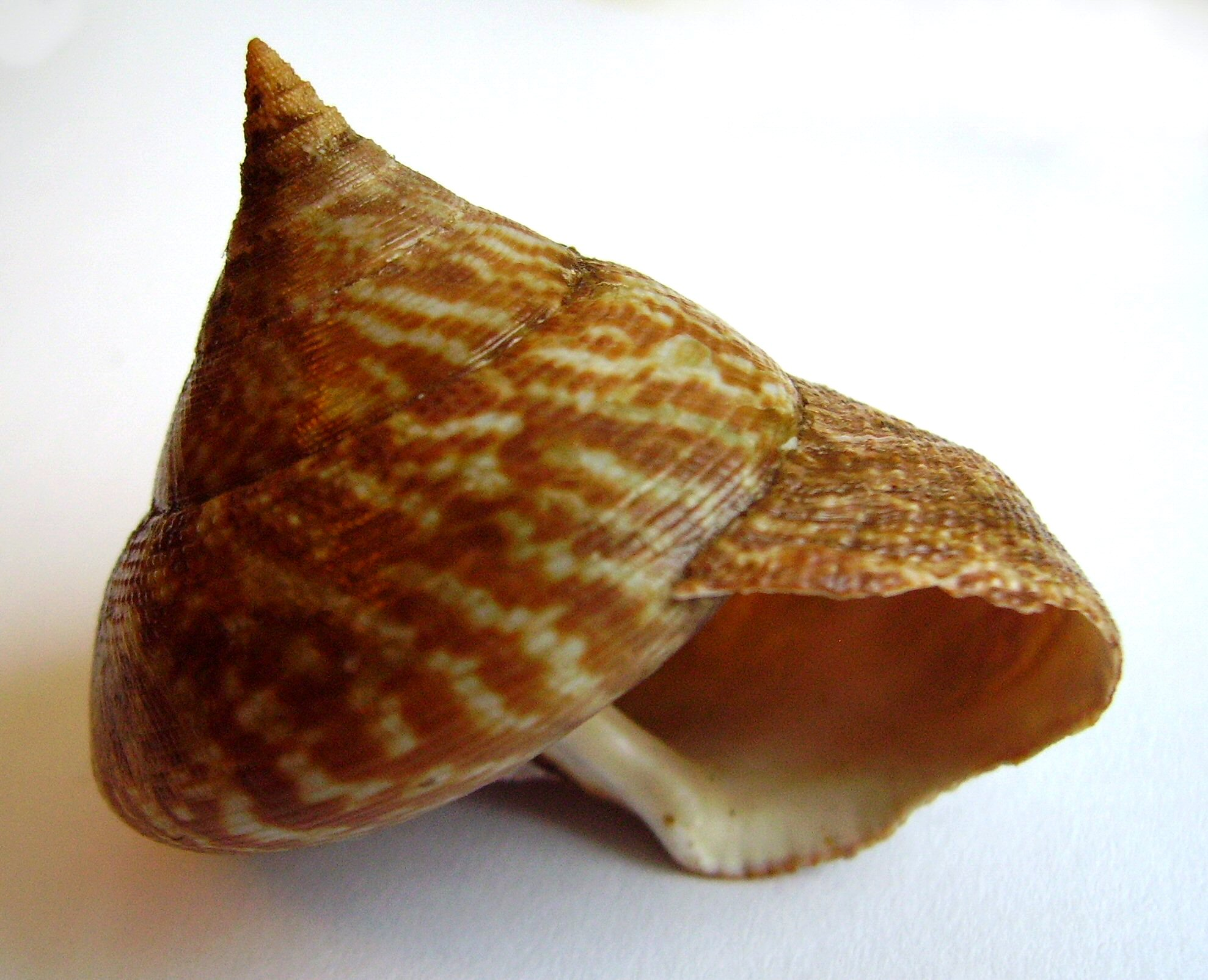
Shell of Maurea tigris, the tiger top snail

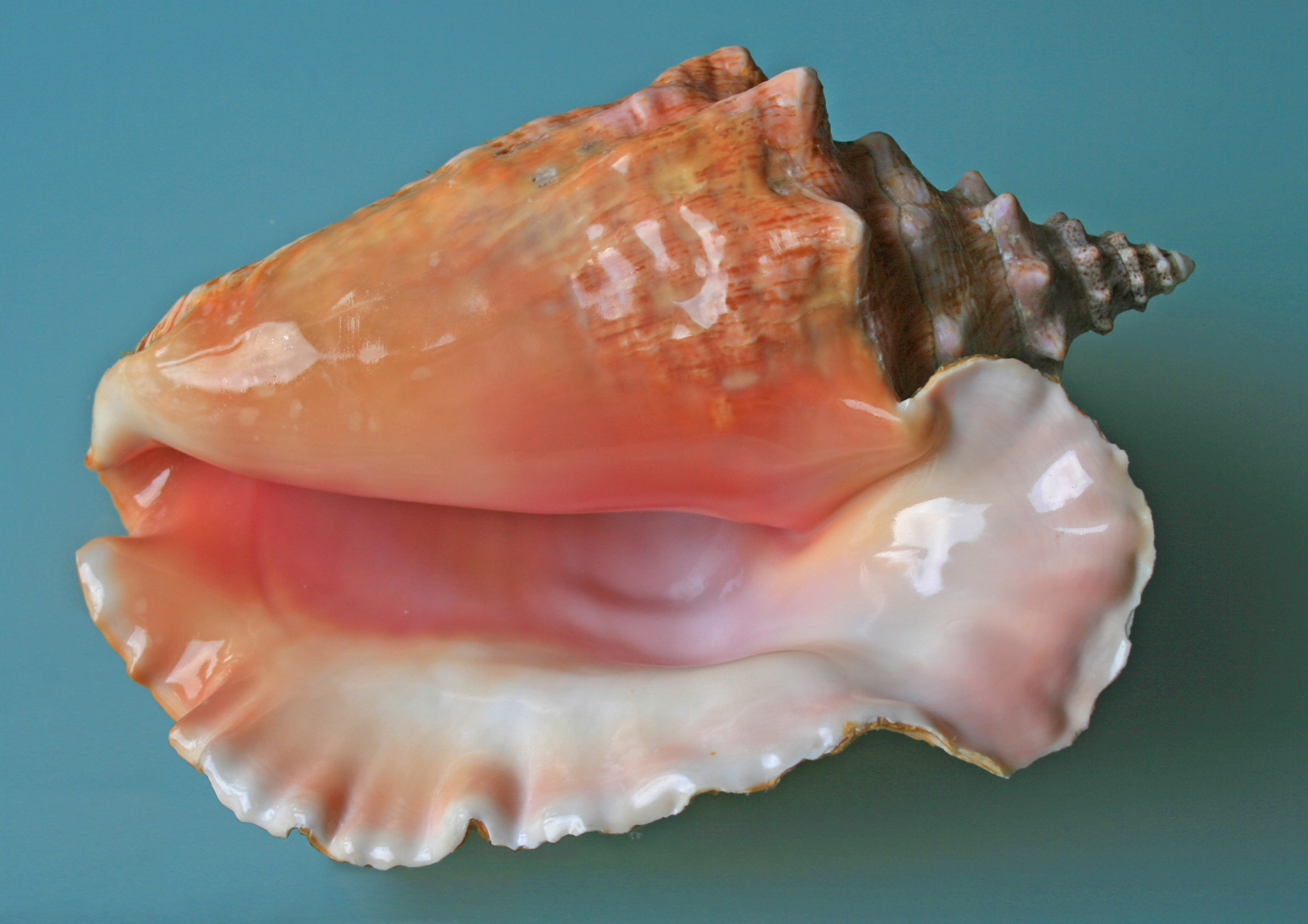
Shell of Lobatus gigas, the queen conch

Conchology (from Ancient Greek κόγχος (kónkhos) 'cockle' and -λογία (-logía) 'study of') is the study of mollusc shells. Conchology is one aspect of malacology, the study of molluscs; however, malacology is the study of molluscs as whole organisms, whereas conchology is confined to the study of their shells. It includes the study of terrestrial and freshwater mollusc shells, as well as seashells and extends to the study of a gastropod's operculum.

Conchology is now sometimes seen as an archaic study, because relying on only one aspect of an organism's morphology can be misleading. However, a shell often gives at least some insight into molluscan taxonomy, and historically the shell was often the only part of exotic species that was available for study. Even in current museum collections it is common for the dry material (shells) to greatly exceed the amount of material that is preserved whole in alcohol.

Conchologists mainly deal with four molluscan classes: Gastropoda (snails only), Bivalvia (e.g. clams), Polyplacophora (the chitons), and Scaphopoda (the tusk shells). Cephalopods only have small internal shells, with the exception of the Nautiloidea. Some groups, such as the sea slug nudibranchs, have lost their shells altogether, while in others it has been replaced by a protein support structure.

== Versus shell collecting ==
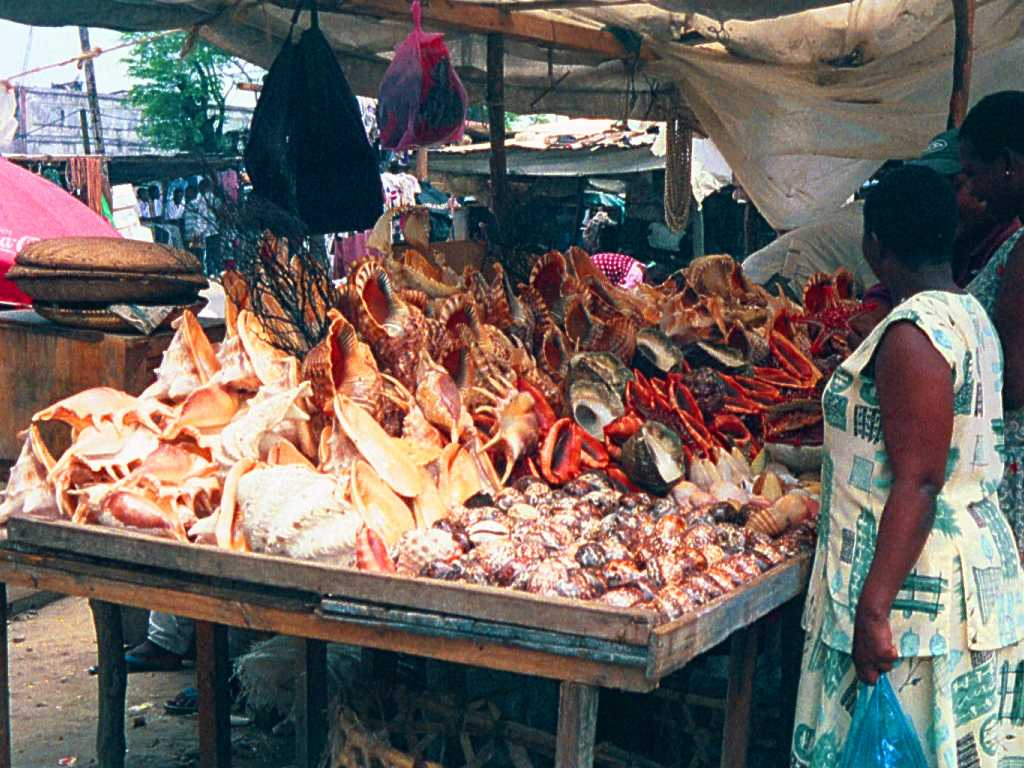
A vendor in Tanzania with a variety of large seashells for sale

The terms shell collector and conchologist can be regarded as two distinct categories. Not all shell collectors are conchologists; some are primarily concerned with the aesthetic value of shells instead of their scientific study. It is also true that not all conchologists are shell collectors; this type of research only requires access to private or institutional shell collections. There is some debate in the conchological community, with some people regarding all shell collectors (regardless of motivation) as conchologists.

== History ==
Shell collecting, the precursor of conchology, dates back thousands of years. Archaeologists have sometimes uncovered Stone Age oceanic seashell necklaces in areas far from the ocean, indicating that they were traded, and shell jewellery has been found at archaeological sites around the world.

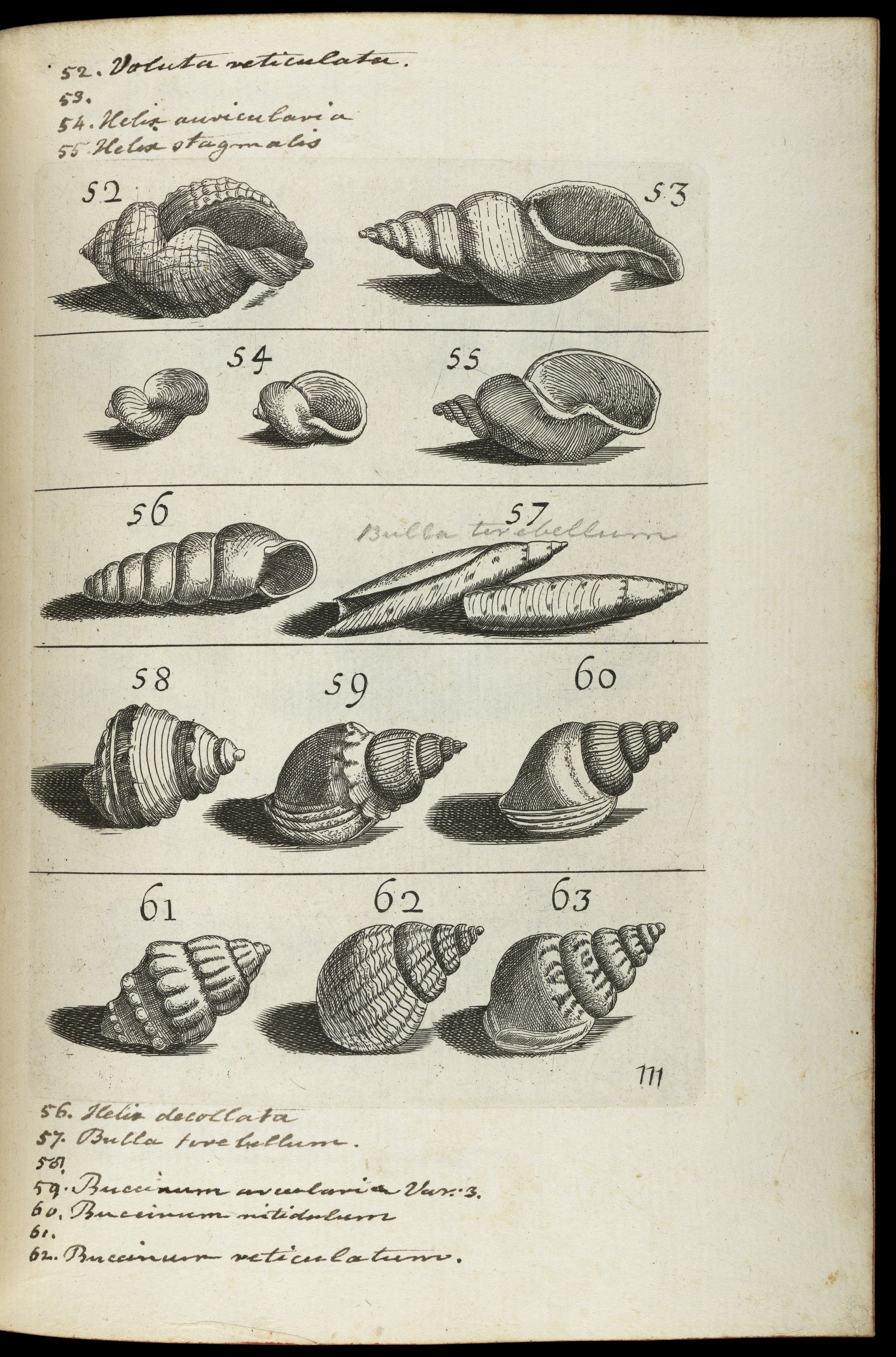
Sea shells from Recreatione dell'occhio e della mente by Filippo Bonanni

During the Renaissance people began collecting natural objects of beauty for private cabinets of curiosities. Because of their attractiveness, variety, durability and ubiquity, shells frequently became a large part of such collections. Scientific interest began to develop towards the end of the 17th century, and in 1681 The Jesuit priest Filippo Bonanni published the two-volume atlas Ricreazione dell'occhio et della mente nell'osservazione delle chiocciole ("Recreation of the eye and of the mind in the observation of molluscs"), the first treatise devoted entirely to mollusc shells. In 1692 Martin Lister published Historia Conchyliorum, a comprehensive conchological text with more than 1,000 engraved plates.

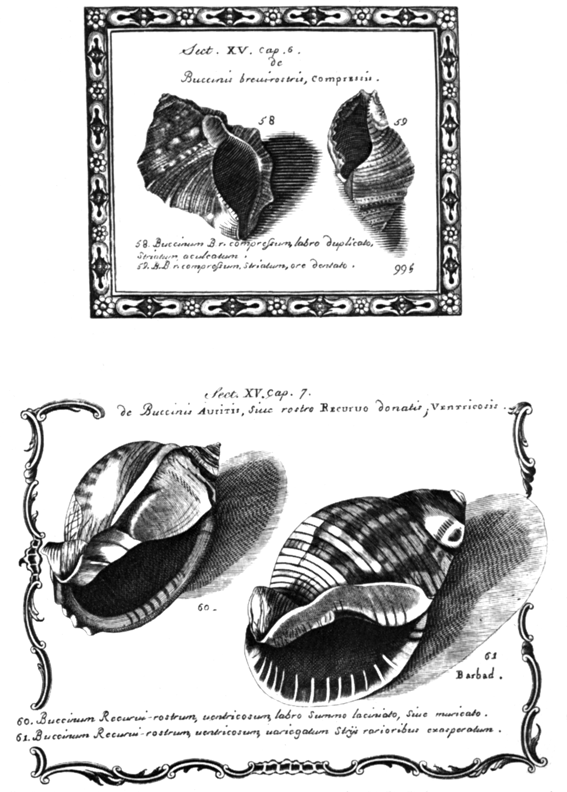
A plate from Lister's book, showing what he calls buccinis shells

George Rumpf, or "Rumphius", (1627–1702) published the first genuine mollusc taxonomy. He suggested the categories "single shelled ones" (modern Polyplacophora, limpets, and abalone), "snails or whelks" (Gastropoda), and "two-shelled ones" (Bivalvia). He did not include the tusk shells or the internal shells of the cephalopods.

Many of Rumpf's terms were later adopted by Carl Linnaeus. The study of zoology, including conchology, was revolutionized by Linnaeus and his system of binomial nomenclature. Six hundred eighty three of the approximately 4,000 animal species Linnaeus described are now considered to be molluscs, although Linnaeus placed them in several different phyla at the time. The English word "conchology" was coined in the 1770s by the British Sephardi naturalist Emanuel Mendes da Costa, who published The Elements of Conchology: or, an Introduction to the Knowledge of Shells in London in 1776.

Since 1700 a number of prominent conchologists have published their studies of shells. John Mawe (1764–1829) produced arguably the first conchology guidebook, The Voyager's Companion or Shell-Collector's Pilot, as well as The Linnæan System of Conchology. Hugh Cuming (1791–1865) is famous for his huge collection and numerous discoveries of new species. Thomas Say wrote the fundamental work American Conchology, or Descriptions of the Shells of North America, Illustrated From Coloured Figures From Original Drawings, Executed from Nature in six volumes (1830–1834).

R. Tucker Abbott was arguably the most prominent conchologist of the 20th century, authoring dozens of books and working as museum director of the Bailey-Matthews Shell Museum. His best-known works are American Seashells, Seashells of the World, and The Kingdom of the Seashell. John DuPont is also known for his extensive collection which he donated to the Delaware Museum of Natural History in 1984. The Japanese emperor Hirohito also amassed a huge collection, and was a competent and respected amateur conchologist.

In 1950, Joyce Allan, an Australian conchologist working as curator of shells at the Australian Museum, authored Australian Shells. This was the first book to catalogue the majority of Australian molluscs in detail and was highly regarded within the scientific community and mollusc collectors.

== Museums ==
Many museums worldwide contain very large and scientifically important shell collections. However, in most cases these are research collections not as readily accessible to the general public as exhibits.

As of 2020 the world's largest assemblage of mollusc shells was held by the Smithsonian Institution, which has c. 1 million lots representing perhaps 50,000 species. The Burke Museum of Natural History and Culture also has a large collection which was donated by Dr. Phil Nudelman in 2013. It includes about 100,000 specimens and 24,000 species, mostly from the Indo-Pacific region, the Caribbean, and the Mediterranean.

=== United States ===
- Academy of Natural Sciences, Philadelphia
- American Museum of Natural History, New York City
- Bailey-Matthews Shell Museum in Sanibel Island, Florida: the only museum in the world dedicated entirely to shells.
- Charleston Marine Life Center, Oregon Institute of Marine Biology in Charleston Oregon
- Denver Museum of Nature & Science, Denver, Colorado: approximately 17,500 shell lots.
- Museum of Comparative Zoology at Cambridge, Massachusetts
- National Museum of Natural History, Washington D.C. – The Smithsonian has c. 1 million lots, the largest worldwide

=== Europe ===
- Austria, Vienna – Naturhistorisches Museum
- Belgium, Brussels – Royal Belgian Institute of Natural Sciences, one of the three largest collections
- France, Paris – Muséum national d'Histoire naturelle 900,000 lots, 5 million specimens
- Germany
  - Frankfurt – Naturmuseum Senckenberg, 700,000 lots (33,000 living taxa, 12,000 fossil taxa)
  - Berlin – Berlin's Natural History Museum
- Netherlands, Leiden – Natural History Museum, Leiden
- Sweden, Stockholm – Swedish Museum of Natural History

=== United Kingdom ===
- London – Natural History Museum 8 million specimens, 60,000 type specimens
- Cardiff – National Museum Cardiff, second largest UK collection, over 2 million specimens
- Manchester – Manchester Museum, fourth largest UK collection; 166,000 lots.
- Cambridge – Cambridge University Museum of Zoology, over 100,000 lots

== Organizations ==
Like other scientific fields, conchologists have a number of local, national, and international organizations. There are also many organizations specializing in specific subareas.

- Association Française de Conchyliologie
- Belgian Society for Conchology
- Club Conchylia, the German/Austrian Society for Shell Collecting
- Conchological Society of Great Britain and Ireland
- Conchologists of America
- Conquiliologistas do Brasil
- Nederlandse Malacologische Vereniging
- Unitas Malacologica

== Depictions of shells on stamps and coins ==
Shells have been featured on over 5,000 postage stamps worldwide, and have been featured on many coins including the Bahamian dollar (1974), the Cuban peso (1981), the Haitian gourde (1973), the Nepalese rupee (1989) and Philippine peso (1993).

== See also ==
- Category:Conchologists
- Midden

== Sources ==
- National Geographic Magazine, March 1969, "The Magic Lure of Sea Shells", Paul A. Zahl
- Seashells of the Northern Hemisphere, 1990, Surrey, R. Tucker Abbott
