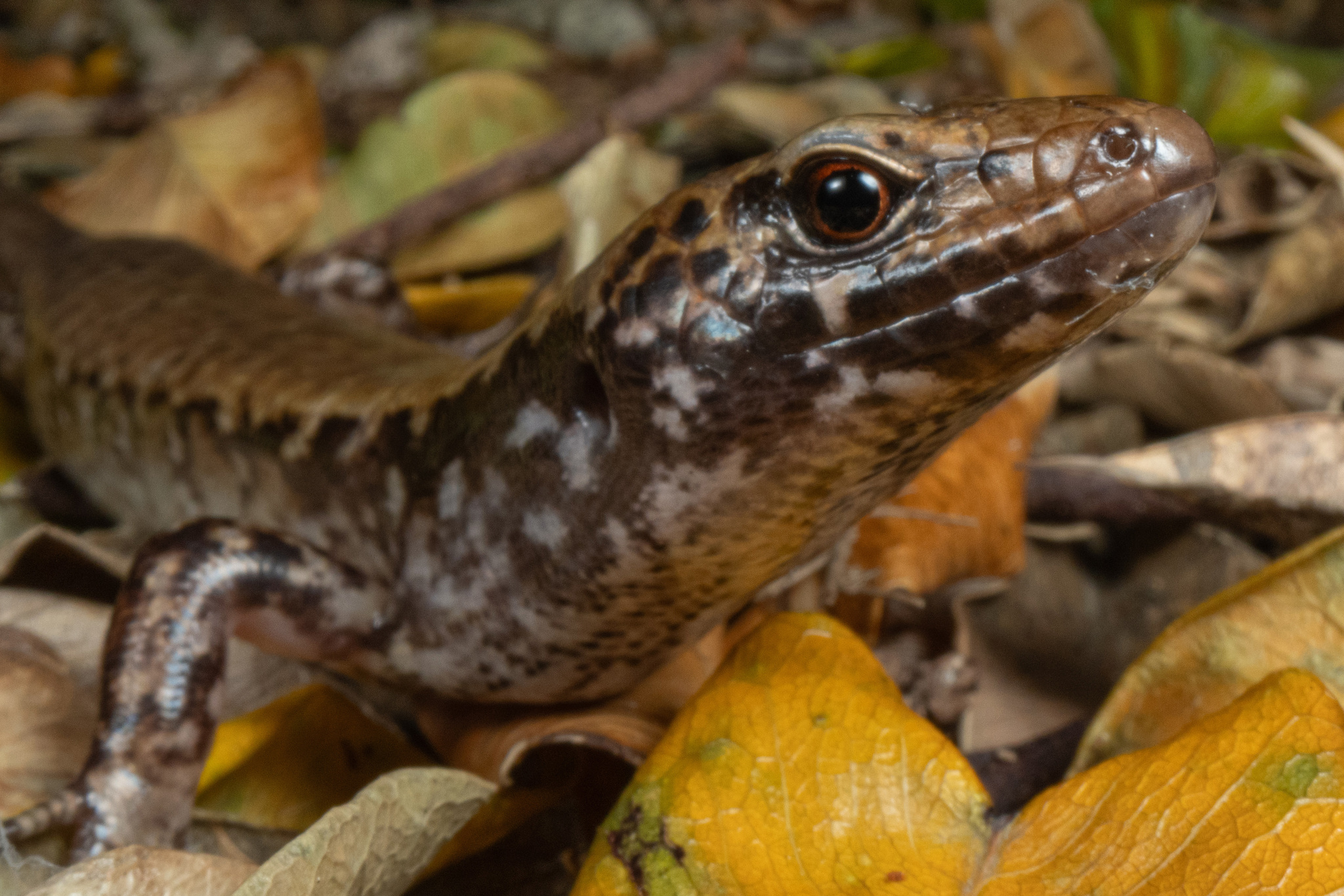
- Oligosoma oliveri

Conservation status
- Near Threatened (IUCN 3.1)

Scientific classification
- Kingdom: Animalia
- Phylum: Chordata
- Class: Reptilia
- Order: Squamata
- Family: Scincidae
- Genus: Oligosoma
- Species: O. oliveri

Binomial name
- Oligosoma oliveri (McCann, 1955)
- Geographic distribution of the marbled skink on a map of the North Island of New Zealand Known native range

Synonyms
- Leiolopisma oliveri McCann, 1955; Leiolopisma pachystomaticum Robb, 1975; Cyclodina oliveri — Hardy, 1977; Oligosoma oliveri — Patterson & T.P. Bell, 2009

= Marbled skink =

Species of lizard

The marbled skink (Oligosoma oliveri), also known commonly as Oliver's New Zealand skink and Oliver's skink, is a species of lizard in the subfamily Lygosominae of the family Scincidae. The species is endemic to New Zealand.

== Etymology ==
The specific name, oliveri, is in honor of New Zealand ornithologist Walter Reginald Brook Oliver.

== Description ==
Oligosoma oliveri may attain a maximum snout-to-vent length (SVL) of 11.6 cm (4.6 in).

== Habitat ==
The preferred natural habitat of Oligosoma oliveri is the leaf litter of forest and shrubland.

== Behavior ==
Oligosoma oliveri is terrestrial, and it is both crepuscular and nocturnal.

== Diet ==
Oligosoma oliveri is omnivorous. It preys upon invertebrates, and it also eats berries and other fruit.

== Reproduction ==
Oligosoma oliveri is viviparous. Litter size is two to four neonates.
