= Strombus (journal) =

- Discipline: Malacology
- Language: English
- Edited by: Daniel C. Cavallari

Publication details
- History: 1998-present
- Publisher: Conquiliologistas do Brasil (Brazil)
- Frequency: Biannual
- Open access: yes

Standard abbreviations
- ISO 4: Strombus

Indexing
- ISSN: 1415-2827 (print); 1983-2214 (web)

Links
- Journal homepage; Online archive

Strombus is a Brazilian peer-reviewed scientific journal published by the Conchologists of Brazil. It covers research in malacology.

== Abstracting and indexing ==
The journal is abstracted and indexed by Aquatic Sciences and Fisheries Abstracts, ProQuest, Qualis CAPES, SCOPUS, The Zoological Record, Ulrich's Periodical Directory, CiteFactor and OAJI.
