= Maurea acutangula =

Scientific classification
- Kingdom: Animalia
- Phylum: Mollusca
- Class: Gastropoda
- Subclass: Vetigastropoda
- Order: Trochida
- Superfamily: Trochoidea
- Family: Calliostomatidae
- Genus: Maurea
- Species: †M. acutangula

Binomial name
- †Maurea acutangula (Suter, 1917)

Synonyms
- Calliostoma (Maurea) acutangulum Suter, 1917; Calliostoma acutangulum Suter, 1917

Extinct species of gastropod

Maurea acutangula is an extinct species of sea snail, a marine gastropod mollusk, in the family Calliostomatidae within the superfamily Trochoidea, the top snails, turban snails and their allies.
