= Maurea maui =

Scientific classification
- Kingdom: Animalia
- Phylum: Mollusca
- Class: Gastropoda
- Subclass: Vetigastropoda
- Order: Trochida
- Superfamily: Trochoidea
- Family: Calliostomatidae
- Genus: Maurea
- Species: M. maui

Binomial name
- Maurea maui (B. A. Marshall, 1995)

Synonyms
- Calliostoma (Maurea) maui B. A. Marshall, 1995; Calliostoma maui B. A. Marshall, 1995

Species of gastropod

Maurea maui is a species of sea snail, a marine gastropod mollusk, in the family Calliostomatidae within the superfamily Trochoidea, the top snails, turban snails and their allies.
