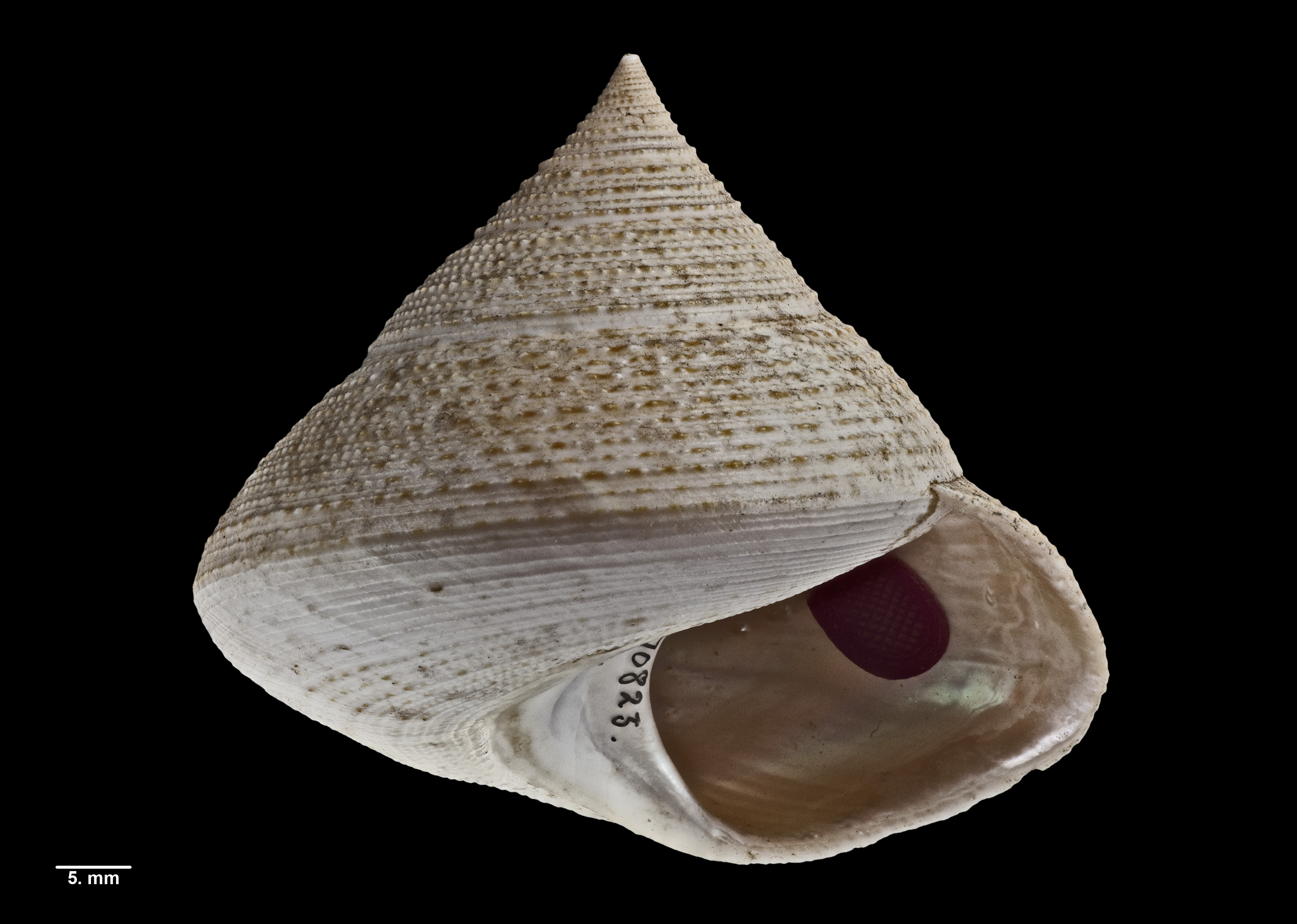

Scientific classification
- Kingdom: Animalia
- Phylum: Mollusca
- Class: Gastropoda
- Subclass: Vetigastropoda
- Order: Trochida
- Superfamily: Trochoidea
- Family: Calliostomatidae
- Genus: Maurea
- Species: M. selecta

Binomial name
- Maurea selecta (Dillwyn, 1817)

Synonyms
- List: Calliostoma (Calliotropis) pagoda W. R. B. Oliver, 1926; Calliostoma (Maurea) selectum (Dillwyn, 1817); Calliostoma carnicolor Preston, 1907; Calliostoma cunninghamii (Gray, 1833); Calliostoma pagoda W. R. B. Oliver, 1926; Calliostoma selectum (Dillwyn, 1817); Trochus cunninghami Gray in Griffith & Pidgeon, 1833; Trochus selectus Dillwyn, 1817; Venustas cunninghami (Gray, 1833); Venustas cunninghami regifica Finlay, 1927; Zizyphinus hodgei Hutton, 1875; Zizyphinus ponderosus Hutton, 1885

= Maurea selecta =

Species of gastropod

Maurea selecta is a species of sea snail, a marine gastropod mollusk, in the family Calliostomatidae within the superfamily Trochoidea, the top snails, turban snails and their allies.
