= Maoricrypta kopua =

Scientific classification
- Kingdom: Animalia
- Phylum: Mollusca
- Class: Gastropoda
- Subclass: Caenogastropoda
- Order: Littorinimorpha
- Family: Calyptraeidae
- Genus: Maoricrypta
- Species: M. kopua

Binomial name
- Maoricrypta kopua Marshall, 2003

Species of gastropod

Maoricrypta kopua is a species of sea snail, a marine gastropod mollusk in the family Calyptraeidae, the slipper snails or slipper limpets, cup-and-saucer snails, and Chinese hat snails.

== Description ==
Maoricrypta kopua are small to medium-sized sea snails.
