= Maurea finlayi =

Scientific classification
- Kingdom: Animalia
- Phylum: Mollusca
- Class: Gastropoda
- Subclass: Vetigastropoda
- Order: Trochida
- Superfamily: Trochoidea
- Family: Calliostomatidae
- Genus: Maurea
- Species: †M. finlayi

Binomial name
- †Maurea finlayi Marwick, 1928

Synonyms
- Calliostoma (Maurea) finlayi (Marwick, 1928); Calliostoma finlayi (Marwick, 1928)

Extinct species of gastropod

Maurea finlayi is an extinct species of sea snail, a marine gastropod mollusk, in the family Calliostomatidae within the superfamily Trochoidea, the top snails, turban snails and their allies.
