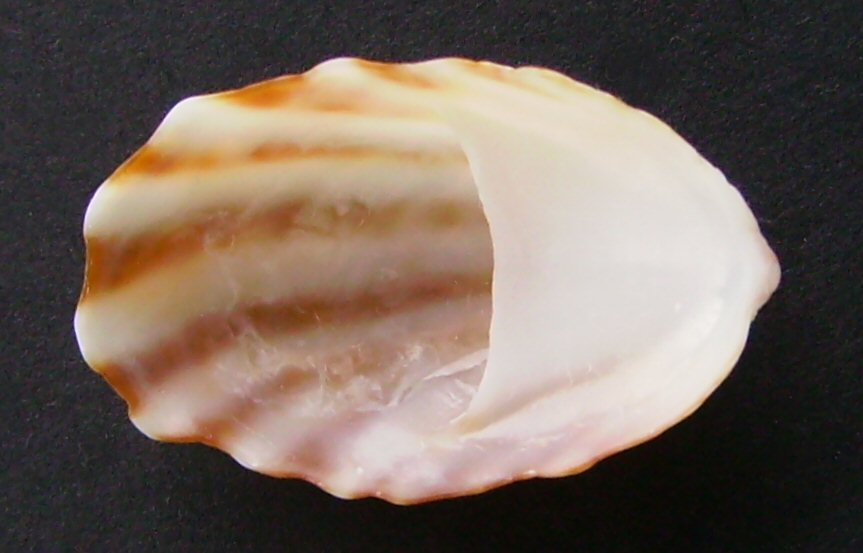
- apertural view of Maoricrypta costata

Scientific classification
- Kingdom: Animalia
- Phylum: Mollusca
- Class: Gastropoda
- Subclass: Caenogastropoda
- Order: Littorinimorpha
- Family: Calyptraeidae
- Genus: Maoricrypta; Finlay, 1926

Type species
- Crepidula costata G. B. Sowerby I, 1824

Species
- See text.

Synonyms
- Zeacrypta Finlay, 1926

= Maoricrypta =

Genus of gastropods

Maoricrypta is a genus of small to medium-sized sea snails, marine gastropod molluscs in the family Calyptraeidae, the slipper snails, cup and saucer shells and Chinese hat shells.

This marine genus is known to occur off New Zealand and Australia.

== Species ==
Species within the genus Maoricrypta include:

- Maoricrypta costata (G.B. Sowerby I, 1824)
- † Maoricrypta haliotoidea Marwick, 1926
- Maoricrypta immersa (Angas, 1865)
- Maoricrypta kopua Marshall, 2003
- Maoricrypta monoxyla (Lesson, 1831)
- † Maoricrypta profunda Hutton
- † Maoricrypta radiata (Hutton, 1873)
- Maoricrypta sodalis B. A. Marshall, 2003
- Maoricrypta youngi Powell, 1940
