= Venustas fragilis =

Scientific classification
- Kingdom: Animalia
- Phylum: Mollusca
- Class: Gastropoda
- Subclass: Vetigastropoda
- Order: Trochida
- Superfamily: Trochoidea
- Family: Calliostomatidae
- Genus: †Venustas
- Species: †V. fragilis

Binomial name
- †Venustas fragilis Finlay, 1926

Synonyms
- † Calliostoma (Maurea) fragile Finlay, 1923; † Calliostoma fragile Finlay, 1923; † Calliostoma suteri var. fragile Finlay, 1923; † Maurea fragilis (Finlay, 1923)

Extinct species of gastropod

Venustas fragilis is an extinct species of sea snail, a marine gastropod mollusk, in the family Calliostomatidae within the superfamily Trochoidea, the top snails, turban snails and their allies.
