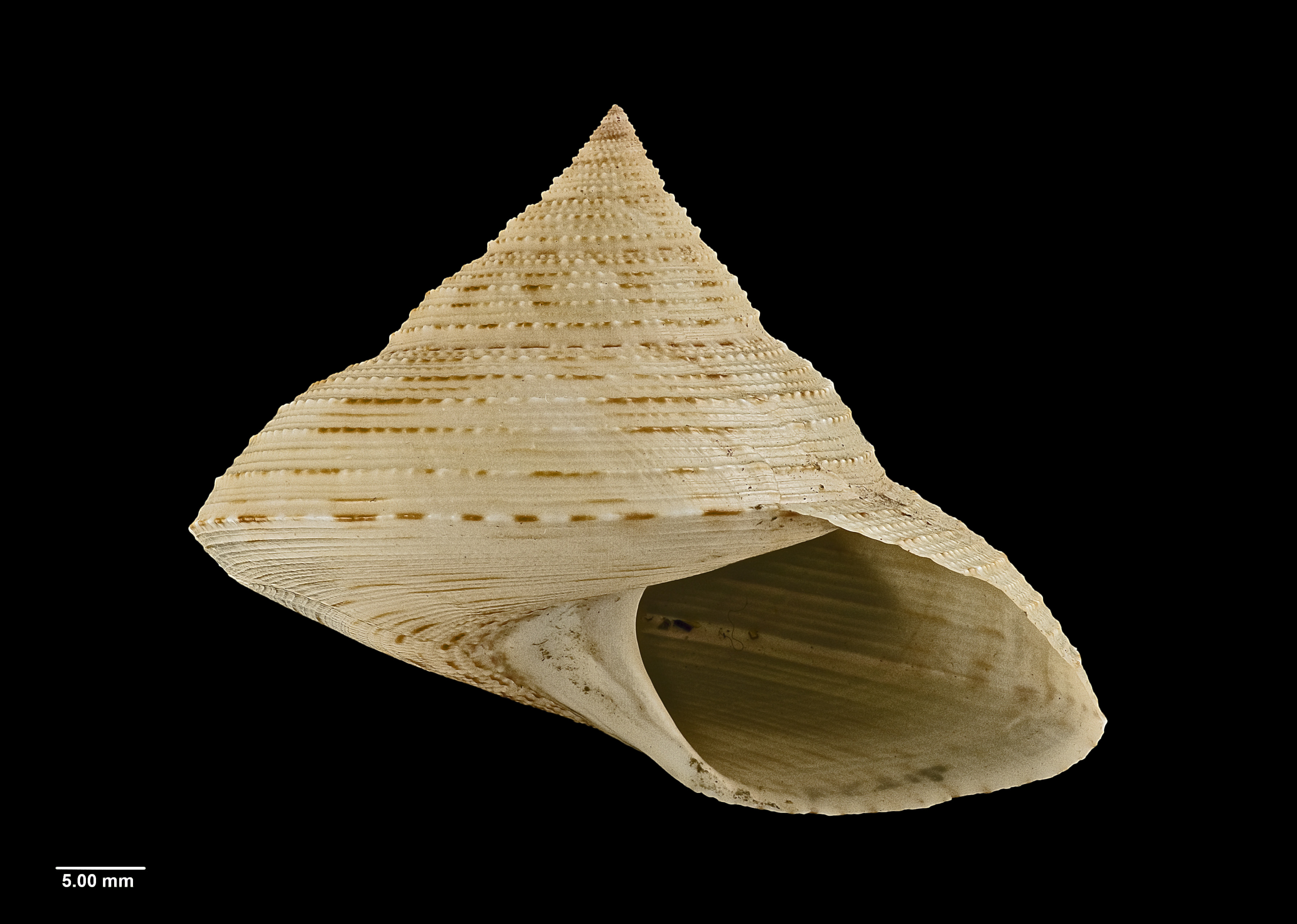

Conservation status
- Not Threatened (NZ TCS)

Scientific classification
- Kingdom: Animalia
- Phylum: Mollusca
- Class: Gastropoda
- Subclass: Vetigastropoda
- Order: Trochida
- Superfamily: Trochoidea
- Family: Calliostomatidae
- Genus: Maurea
- Species: M. turnerarum

Binomial name
- Maurea turnerarum Powell, 1964

Synonyms
- Calliostoma (Maurea) turnerarum (Powell, 1964); Calliostoma turnerarum (Powell, 1964)

= Maurea turnerarum =

Species of gastropod

Maurea turnerarum is a species of sea snail, a marine gastropod mollusk, in the family Calliostomatidae within the superfamily Trochoidea, the top snails, turban snails and their allies.
