= Maurea simulans =

Scientific classification
- Kingdom: Animalia
- Phylum: Mollusca
- Class: Gastropoda
- Subclass: Vetigastropoda
- Order: Trochida
- Superfamily: Trochoidea
- Family: Calliostomatidae
- Genus: Maurea
- Species: M. simulans

Binomial name
- Maurea simulans (B. A. Marshall, 1994)

Synonyms
- Calliostoma (Maurea) simulans B. A. Marshall, 1994; Calliostoma simulans B. A. Marshall, 1994; Calliostoma (Spicator) simulans (Smith, 1899); Laetifautor simulans (Smith, 1899); Monilea simulans Smith, 1899

Species of gastropod

Maurea simulans is a species of sea snail, a marine gastropod mollusk, in the family Calliostomatidae within the superfamily Trochoidea, the top snails, turban snails and their allies.

== Description ==
It is a light greyish colour with white dots on its body. It looks like a regular snail in the sense that its shell is a spiral shape. It is 57mm tall and 53mm wide.

== Distribution ==
This marine species occurs off New Zealand, off the coast of New Plymouth, Cape Palliser south to the Banks Peninsula. It is also found on Chatham Rise and off Bounty and Campbell Island; also off Western Australia.

== Habitat ==
It makes its home in the mud and lives in its shell for all of its life.
