= Apex (mollusc) =

Part of the shell of a mollusk

In anatomy, an apex (adjectival form: apical) is part of the shell of a mollusk. The apex is the pointed tip (the oldest part) of the shell of a gastropod, scaphopod, or cephalopod.

The apex is used in end-blown conches.

== Gastropods ==
The word "apex" is most often used to mean the tip of the spire of the shell of a gastropod. The apex is the first-formed, and therefore the oldest, part of the shell. To be more precise, the apex would usually be where the tip of the embryonic shell or protoconch is situated, if that is still present in the adult shell (often it is lost or eroded away).

=== Coiled gastropod shells ===
The phrase apical whorls, or protoconch, means the whorls that constitute the embryonic shell at the apex of the shell, especially when this is clearly distinguishable from the later whorls of the shell, otherwise known as the teleoconch.

Comparison of the apical part and the whole shell of Otukaia kiheiziebisu:

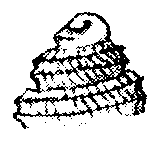

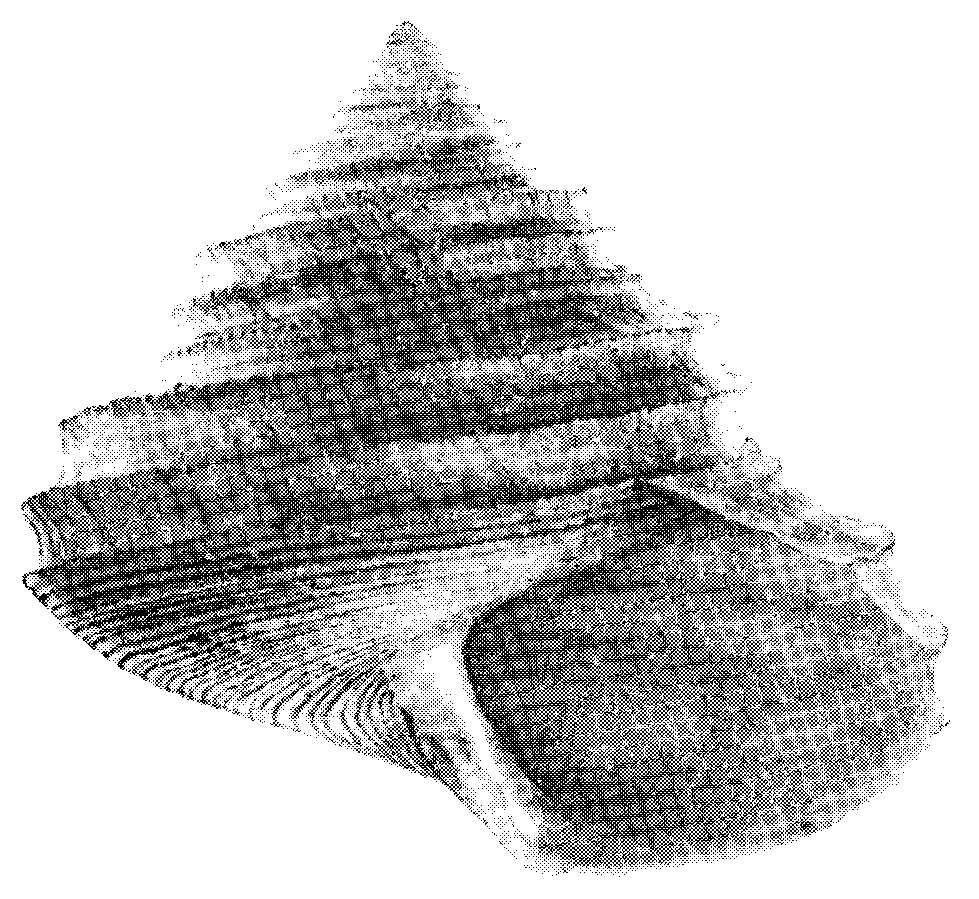

=== Limpet-like gastropod shells ===
Where this feature is present, the space under the apex of a patellate or patelliform (limpet-like) gastropod shell is called the apical cavity.

== Scaphopods ==
The apex of tusk shells is the small, open posterior end, and the opening itself is usually called the apical aperture.

== Cephalopods ==
In orthocone cephalopods, the pointed end of the shell is called the apex, and shell growth is away from the apex and toward the aperture. The first chamber of the apex is sometimes called the protoconch.

== Bivalves ==
The apex of a valve of a bivalve shell is the area around what is most commonly the umbo or beak. In some species the embryonic shell or prodissoconch may be present at the apex of each of the two valves.
