= Otukaia ikukoae =

Scientific classification
- Kingdom: Animalia
- Phylum: Mollusca
- Class: Gastropoda
- Subclass: Vetigastropoda
- Order: Trochida
- Superfamily: Trochoidea
- Family: Calliostomatidae
- Genus: Otukaia
- Species: O. ikukoae

Binomial name
- Otukaia ikukoae Sakurai, 1994

Synonyms
- Tristichotrochus ikukoae (Sakurai, 1994)

Species of gastropod

Otukaia ikukoae is a deepwater sea snail, a marine gastropod mollusc in the family Calliostomatidae, the calliostoma top snails.

== Distribution ==
Okinawa Trough.

== Ecology ==
It was recorded 962 m deep.
