= Maurea fragilis =

Scientific classification
- Kingdom: Animalia
- Phylum: Mollusca
- Class: Gastropoda
- Subclass: Vetigastropoda
- Order: Trochida
- Superfamily: Trochoidea
- Family: Calliostomatidae
- Genus: Maurea
- Species: †M. fragilis

Binomial name
- †Maurea fragilis (Finlay, 1923)

Synonyms
- Calliostoma (Maurea) fragile Finlay, 1923

Extinct species of gastropod

Maurea fragilis is an extinct species of sea snail, a marine gastropod mollusk, in the family Calliostomatidae within the superfamily Trochoidea, the top snails, turban snails and their allies.
