= Maurea suteri =

Scientific classification
- Kingdom: Animalia
- Phylum: Mollusca
- Class: Gastropoda
- Subclass: Vetigastropoda
- Order: Trochida
- Superfamily: Trochoidea
- Family: Calliostomatidae
- Genus: Maurea
- Species: †M. suteri

Binomial name
- †Maurea suteri (Finlay, 1923)

Synonyms
- Calliostoma (Maurea) suteri Finlay, 1923; Calliostoma suteri Finlay, 1923

Extinct species of gastropod

Maurea suteri is an extinct species of sea snail, a marine gastropod mollusk, in the family Calliostomatidae within the superfamily Trochoidea, the top snails, turban snails and their allies. It existed in the Neogene period.
