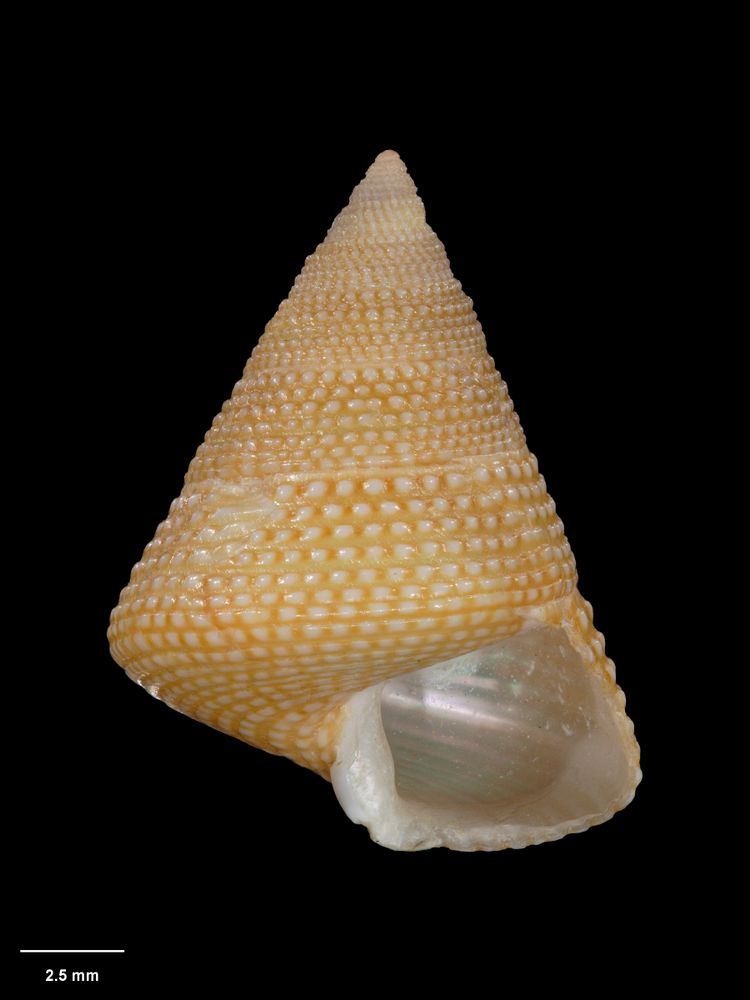

Conservation status
- Naturally Uncommon (NZ TCS)

Scientific classification
- Kingdom: Animalia
- Phylum: Mollusca
- Class: Gastropoda
- Subclass: Vetigastropoda
- Order: Trochida
- Superfamily: Trochoidea
- Family: Calliostomatidae
- Genus: Maurea
- Species: M. gibbsorum

Binomial name
- Maurea gibbsorum (B. A. Marshall, 1995)

Synonyms
- Calliostoma (Maurea) gibbsorum B. A. Marshall, 1995; Calliostoma gibbsorum B. A. Marshall, 1995

= Maurea gibbsorum =

Species of gastropod

Maurea gibbsorum is a species of sea snail, a marine gastropod mollusc, in the family Calliostomatidae within the superfamily Trochoidea, the top snails, turban snails and their allies.
