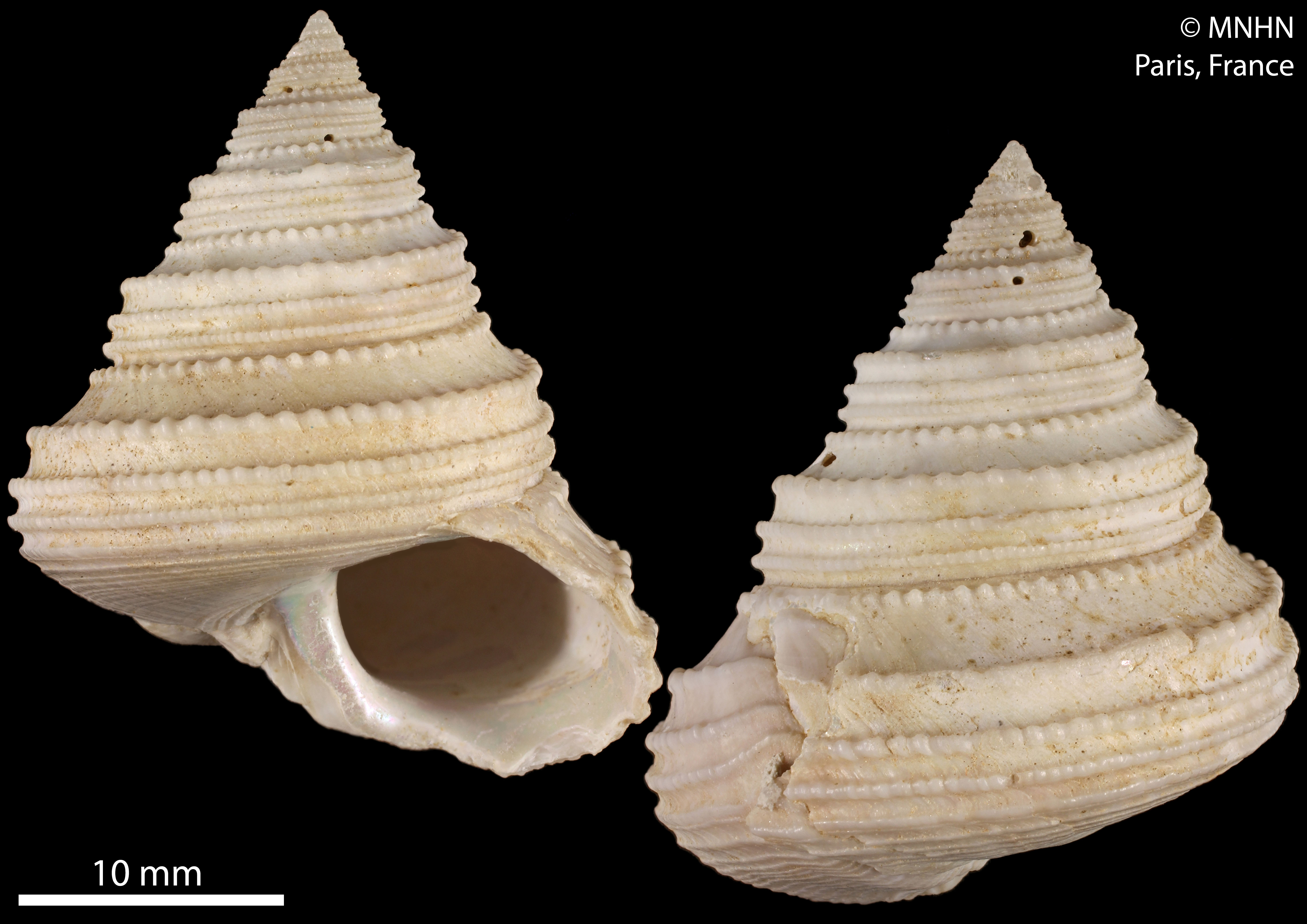
- Shell of Maurea muriellae (paratype at MNHN, Paris)

Scientific classification
- Kingdom: Animalia
- Phylum: Mollusca
- Class: Gastropoda
- Subclass: Vetigastropoda
- Order: Trochida
- Superfamily: Trochoidea
- Family: Calliostomatidae
- Genus: Maurea
- Species: M. muriellae

Binomial name
- Maurea muriellae (Vilvens, 2001)

Synonyms
- Calliostoma muriellae Vilvens, 2001

= Maurea muriellae =

Species of gastropod

Maurea muriellae is a species of sea snail, a marine gastropod mollusk, in the family Calliostomatidae within the superfamily Trochoidea, the top snails, turban snails and their allies.

== Distribution ==
This marine species occurs off Madagascar.
