= Maurea waiareka =

Scientific classification
- Kingdom: Animalia
- Phylum: Mollusca
- Class: Gastropoda
- Subclass: Vetigastropoda
- Order: Trochida
- Superfamily: Trochoidea
- Family: Calliostomatidae
- Genus: Maurea
- Species: †M. waiareka

Binomial name
- †Maurea waiareka Laws, 1935

Synonyms
- Calliostoma (Maurea) waiareka (Laws, 1935); Calliostoma waiareka (Laws, 1935)

Extinct species of gastropod

Maurea waiareka is an extinct species of sea snail, a marine gastropod mollusk, in the family Calliostomatidae within the superfamily Trochoidea, the top snails, turban snails and their allies.
