= Maurea megaloprepes =

Scientific classification
- Kingdom: Animalia
- Phylum: Mollusca
- Class: Gastropoda
- Subclass: Vetigastropoda
- Order: Trochida
- Superfamily: Trochoidea
- Family: Calliostomatidae
- Genus: Maurea
- Species: M. megaloprepes

Binomial name
- Maurea megaloprepes Tomlin, 1948

Synonyms
- Calliostoma megaloprepes (Tomlin, 1948)

Species of gastropod

Maurea megaloprepes is a species of sea snail, a marine gastropod mollusk, in the family Calliostomatidae within the superfamily Trochoidea, the top snails, turban snails and their allies.
