= 1908 Kermadec Islands expedition =

Scientific expedition

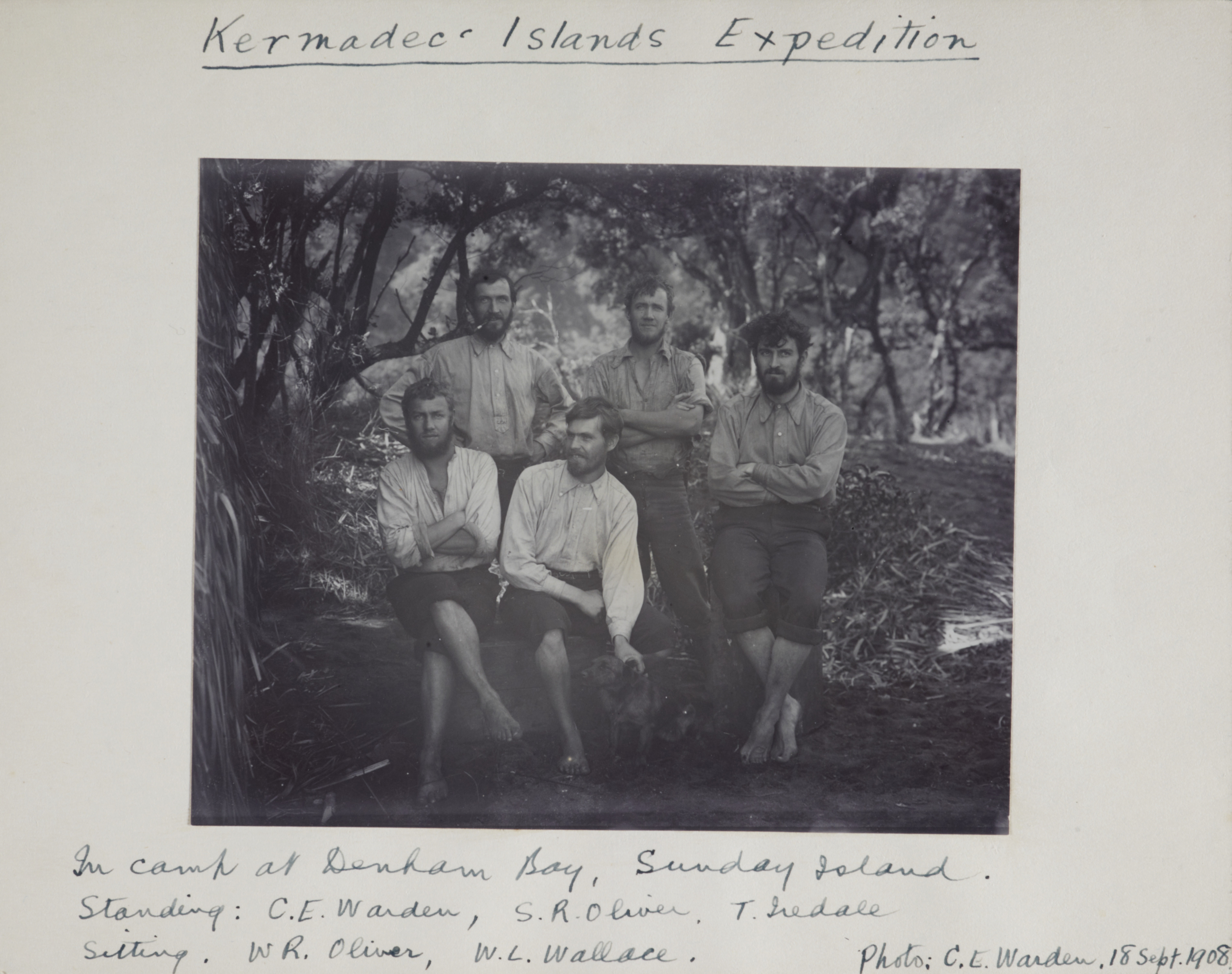
- Location: Kermadec Islands
- Start: December 1907
- End: November 1908
- Leader: Walter Oliver
- Participants: Charles Edward Warden; Walter Oliver; Tom Iredale; S R Oliver; Walter Lawrence Wallace

The 1908 Kermadec Islands expedition was a research expedition undertaken between December 1907 and November 1908 to investigate the biodiversity of the Kermadec Islands.

== Purpose ==
This expedition sought to study the biology, geology and meteorology of the Islands.

== Participants ==
- Walter Oliver, leader, botany and geology
- C. E. Warden, meteorology
- S. R. Oliver, botany and geology
- T. Iredale, birds and shells
- W. L. Wallace, entomology

== Itinerary ==
The party sailed on the Hinemoa from Auckland on 28 December 1907 to the Kermadec Islands where they intended staying for 12 months. The researchers were picked up after ten months, returning to Auckland on 16 November 1908.

== Results of research ==
Walter Oliver described the physical features and structure of the islands in a presentation and paper (5911 words) to the Philosophical Institute of Canterbury on 19 October 1910.

Tom Iredale summarised the bird life and marine mollusca of the Kermadec Islands to the Royal Society of New Zealand in 1910.
