= Otukaia beringensis =

Scientific classification
- Kingdom: Animalia
- Phylum: Mollusca
- Class: Gastropoda
- Subclass: Vetigastropoda
- Order: Trochida
- Superfamily: Trochoidea
- Family: Calliostomatidae
- Genus: Otukaia
- Species: O. beringensis

Binomial name
- Otukaia beringensis Tuskes & R. Clark, 2018

Species of gastropod

Otukaia beringensis is a species of sea snail, a marine gastropod mollusk, in the family Calliostomatidae within the superfamily Trochoidea, the top snails, turban snails and their allies.

== Distribution ==
This species occurs in Aleutian Islands.
