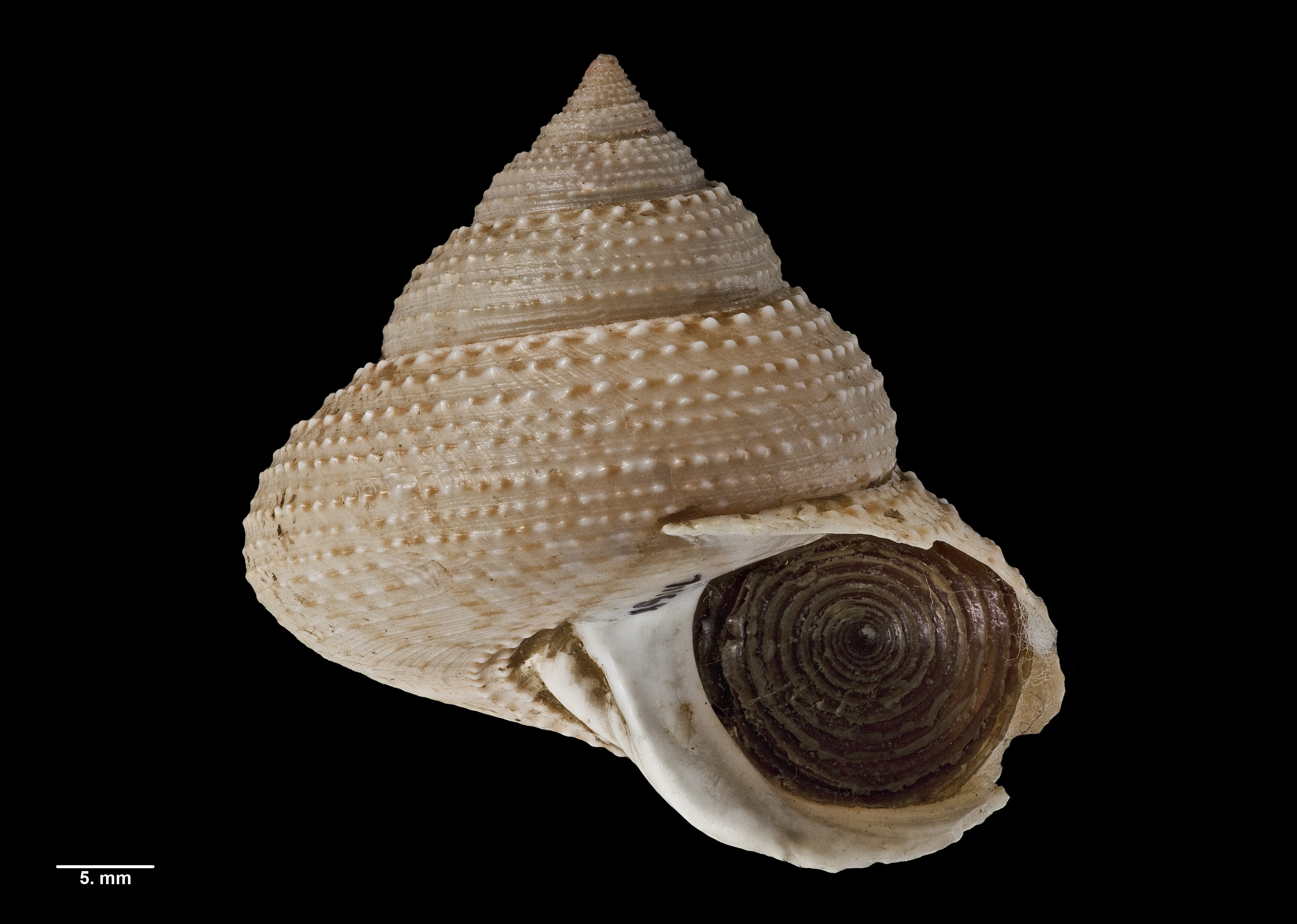

Scientific classification
- Kingdom: Animalia
- Phylum: Mollusca
- Class: Gastropoda
- Subclass: Vetigastropoda
- Order: Trochida
- Superfamily: Trochoidea
- Family: Calliostomatidae
- Genus: Maurea
- Species: M. blacki

Binomial name
- Maurea blacki (Powell, 1950)

Synonyms
- Calliostoma (Maurea) blacki (Powell, 1950); Calliostoma blacki (Powell, 1950); Thoristella chathamensis profunda Dell, 1956; Venustas blacki Powell, 1950; Venustas couperi Vella, 1954

= Maurea blacki =

Species of gastropod

Maurea blacki is a species of sea snail, a marine gastropod mollusk, in the family Calliostomatidae within the superfamily Trochoidea, the top snails, turban snails and their allies.
