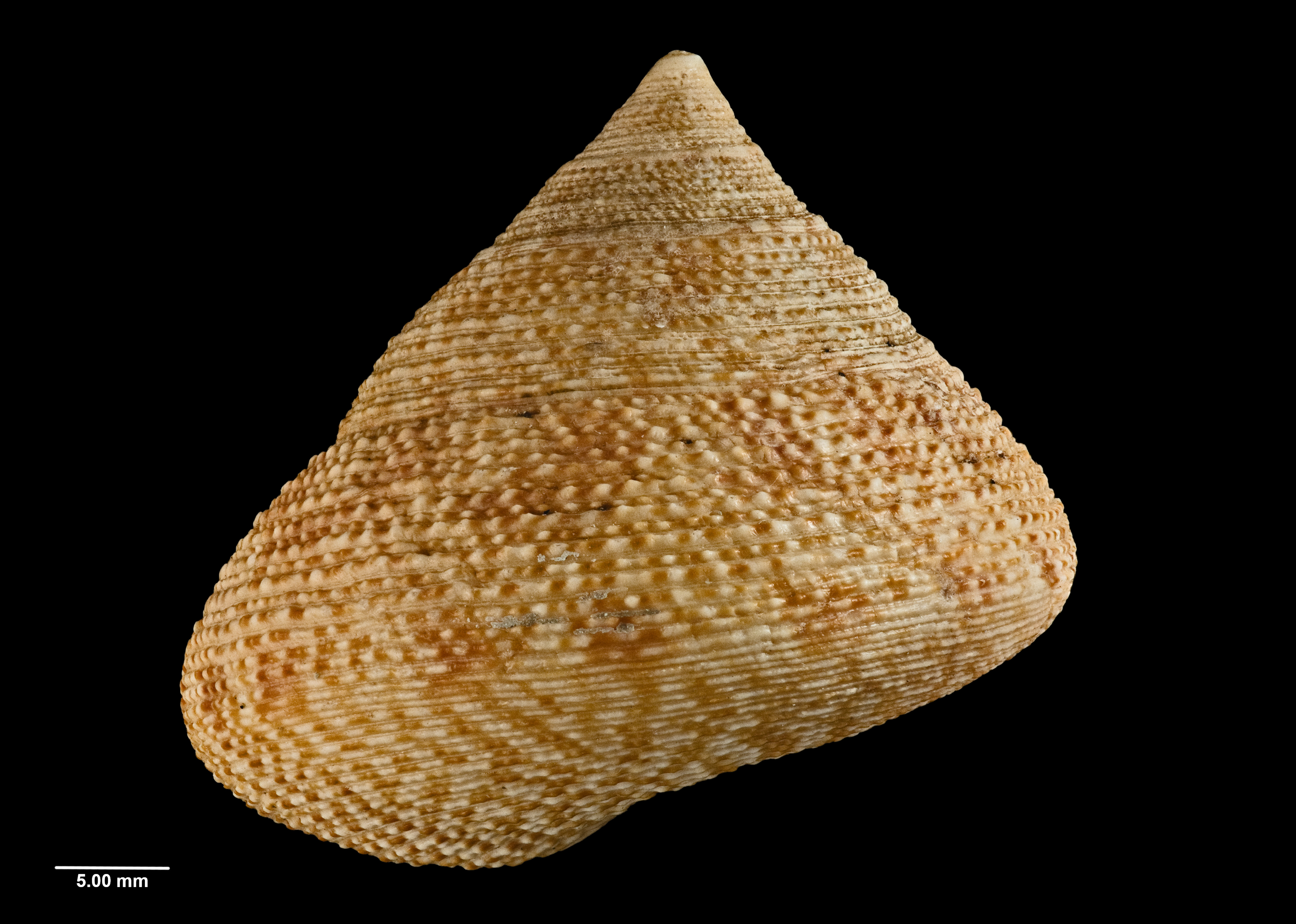

Scientific classification
- Kingdom: Animalia
- Phylum: Mollusca
- Class: Gastropoda
- Subclass: Vetigastropoda
- Order: Trochida
- Superfamily: Trochoidea
- Family: Calliostomatidae
- Genus: Maurea
- Species: M. waikanae

Binomial name
- Maurea waikanae (Oliver, 1926)

Synonyms
- Calliostoma (Calliotropis) waikanae W. R. B. Oliver, 1926; Calliostoma (Maurea) waikanae W. R. B. Oliver, 1926; Calliostoma waikanae Oliver, 1926; Maurea pellucida morioria Powell, 1946; Venustas pellucida forsteriana Dell, 1950; Venustas pellucida haurakiensis Dell, 1950

= Maurea waikanae =

Species of gastropod

Maurea waikanae is a species of sea snail, a marine gastropod mollusk, in the family Calliostomatidae within the superfamily Trochoidea, the top snails, turban snails and their allies.
