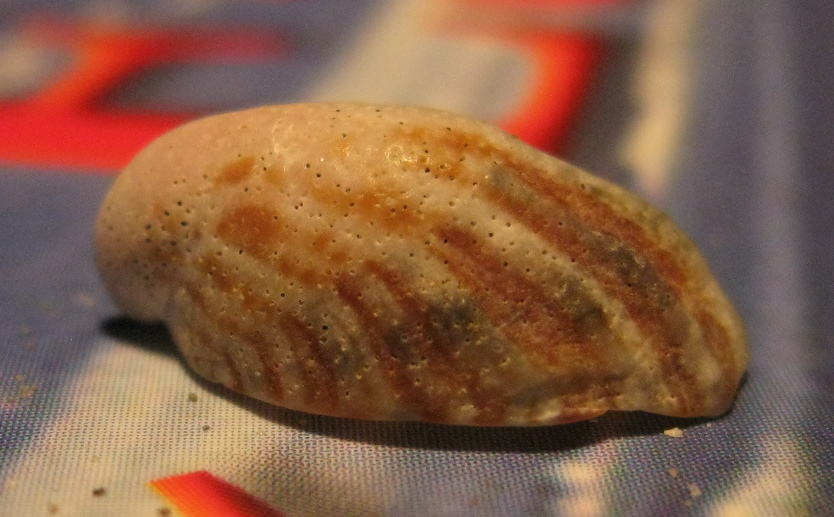
- Maoricrypta youngi shell

Scientific classification
- Kingdom: Animalia
- Phylum: Mollusca
- Class: Gastropoda
- Subclass: Caenogastropoda
- Order: Littorinimorpha
- Family: Calyptraeidae
- Genus: Maoricrypta
- Species: M. youngi

Binomial name
- Maoricrypta youngi Powell, 1940

= Maoricrypta youngi =

Species of gastropod

Maoricrypta youngi is a species of small sea snail or slipper snail, a marine gastropod mollusc in the family Calyptraeidae. It is known to occur in North Island, New Zealand.
