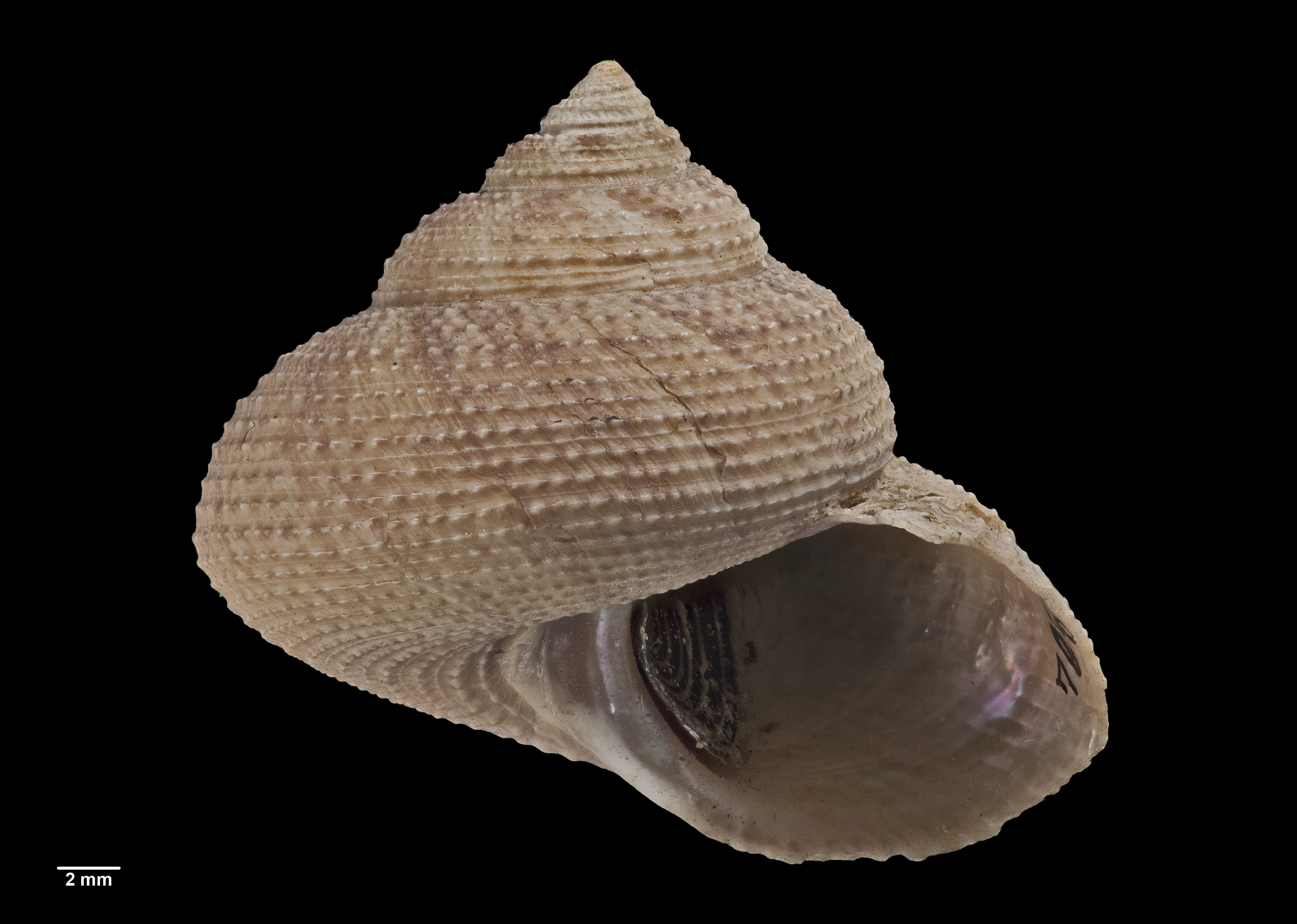

Scientific classification
- Kingdom: Animalia
- Phylum: Mollusca
- Class: Gastropoda
- Subclass: Vetigastropoda
- Order: Trochida
- Superfamily: Trochoidea
- Family: Calliostomatidae
- Genus: Maurea
- Species: M. punctulata

Binomial name
- Maurea punctulata (Martyn, 1784)

Synonyms
- List: Calliostoma (Maurea) punctulatum (Martyn, 1784); Calliostoma (Mauriella) punctulatum (Martyn, 1784); Calliostoma (Mauriella) punctulatum stewartianum W. R. B. Oliver, 1926; Calliostoma (Mauriella) wanganuicum W. R. B. Oliver, 1926; Calliostoma punctulatum (Martyn, 1784); Calliostoma punctulatum urbanior (Finlay, 1926); Maurea (Mucrinops) punctulata (Martyn, 1784); Trochus diaphanus Gmelin, 1791; Trochus punctulatus Martyn, 1784; Turbo grandineus Valenciennes, 1846; Turbo pulcherrimus Noodt, 1819; Turbo pulcherrimus Röding 1798: Venustas (Mucrinops) punctulata (Martyn, 1784); Venustas (Mucrinops) punctulata urbanior Finlay, 1926; Venustas punctulata (Martyn, 1784); Venustas punctulata urbanior Finlay, 1926

= Maurea punctulata =

Species of gastropod

Maurea punctulata is a species of sea snail, a marine gastropod mollusk, in the family Calliostomatidae within the superfamily Trochoidea, the top snails, turban snails and their allies.

== Description ==
The length of the shell attains 41.7 mm.

Its fossil range is from the Quaternary. Maurea is a predator on sessile prey.

== Distribution ==
This marine species is endemic to New Zealand.
