= Maurea delli =

Scientific classification
- Kingdom: Animalia
- Phylum: Mollusca
- Class: Gastropoda
- Subclass: Vetigastropoda
- Order: Trochida
- Superfamily: Trochoidea
- Family: Calliostomatidae
- Genus: Maurea
- Species: M. delli

Binomial name
- Maurea delli (McLean & Andrade, 1982)

Synonyms
- Calliostoma (Otukaia) delli McLean & Andrade, 1982; Calliostoma delli McLean & Andrade, 1982; Otukaia delli (McLean & Andrade, 1982)

Species of gastropod

Maurea delli is a species of sea snail, a marine gastropod mollusk, in the family Calliostomatidae within the superfamily Trochoidea, the top snails, turban snails and their allies.
