= Ikebe =

Ikebe (written: 池部 or 池辺) is a Japanese surname. Notable people with the surname include:

- Hitoshi Ikebe (池部 鈞, 1886–1969), Japanese painter
- Ryō Ikebe (池部 良, 1918–2010), Japanese actor
- Shin'ichirō Ikebe (池辺 晋一郎, born 1943), Japanese composer

== See also ==
- Ikebe Station, a railway station in Nara Prefecture, Japan
