= Maxwell James Grant Smart =

New Zealand historian, archaeologist (1896–1972)

Maxwell James Grant Smart (1896–1972) was a notable New Zealand farmer, museum director, historian, archaeologist and writer. He was born in Wanganui, New Zealand in 1896.
