= Maurea eltanini =

Scientific classification
- Kingdom: Animalia
- Phylum: Mollusca
- Class: Gastropoda
- Subclass: Vetigastropoda
- Order: Trochida
- Superfamily: Trochoidea
- Family: Calliostomatidae
- Genus: Maurea
- Species: M. eltanini

Binomial name
- Maurea eltanini (Dell, 1990)

Synonyms
- Otukaia eltanini Dell, 1990

Species of gastropod

Maurea eltanini is a species of sea snail, a marine gastropod mollusk, in the family Calliostomatidae within the superfamily Trochoidea, the top snails, turban snails and their allies.

== Distribution ==
This species occurs in New Zealand Exclusive Economic Zone.
