= Maurea chilena =

Scientific classification
- Kingdom: Animalia
- Phylum: Mollusca
- Class: Gastropoda
- Subclass: Vetigastropoda
- Order: Trochida
- Superfamily: Trochoidea
- Family: Calliostomatidae
- Genus: Maurea
- Species: M. chilena

Binomial name
- Maurea chilena (Rehder, 1971)

Synonyms
- Calliostoma chilenum Rehder, 1971; Otukaia chilena (Rehder, 1971)

Species of gastropod

Maurea chilena is a species of sea snail, a marine gastropod mollusk, in the family Calliostomatidae within the superfamily Trochoidea, the top snails, turban snails and their allies.

== Description ==
Shell size 30-35 mm. A very rare deepwater species

== Distribution ==
Eastern Pacific Ocean: Chile.
