= Maurea alertae =

Scientific classification
- Kingdom: Animalia
- Phylum: Mollusca
- Class: Gastropoda
- Subclass: Vetigastropoda
- Order: Trochida
- Superfamily: Trochoidea
- Family: Calliostomatidae
- Genus: Maurea
- Species: M. alertae

Binomial name
- Maurea alertae (B. A. Marshall, 1995)

Synonyms
- Alertalex blacki Dell, 1956; Calliostoma (Otukaia) alertae B. A. Marshall, 1995; Calliostoma alertae B. A. Marshall, 1995; Maurea (Alertalex) alertae (B. A. Marshall, 1995); Otukaia blacki (Dell, 1956)

Species of gastropod

Maurea alertae is a species of sea snail, a marine gastropod mollusk, in the family Calliostomatidae within the superfamily Trochoidea, the top snails, turban snails and their allies.

The deep water snail Alertalex blacki was named after the ship that took the 1954 expedition to the Chatham Islands and its master.
