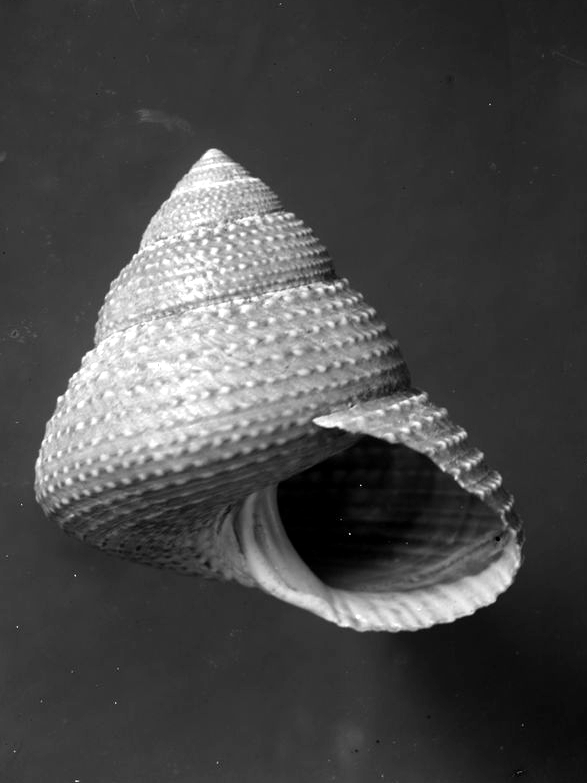
- Shell of Maurea foveauxana (specimen at Museum of New Zealand Te Papa Tongarewa)

Scientific classification
- Kingdom: Animalia
- Phylum: Mollusca
- Class: Gastropoda
- Subclass: Vetigastropoda
- Order: Trochida
- Superfamily: Trochoidea
- Family: Calliostomatidae
- Genus: Maurea
- Species: M. foveauxana

Binomial name
- Maurea foveauxana (Dell, 1950)

Synonyms
- Calliostoma (Maurea) foveauxanum (Dell, 1950); Calliostoma foveauxanum (Dell, 1950); Venustas foveauxana Dell, 1950

= Maurea foveauxana =

Species of gastropod

Maurea foveauxana is a species of sea snail, a marine gastropod mollusk, in the family Calliostomatidae within the superfamily Trochoidea, the top snails, turban snails and their allies.
