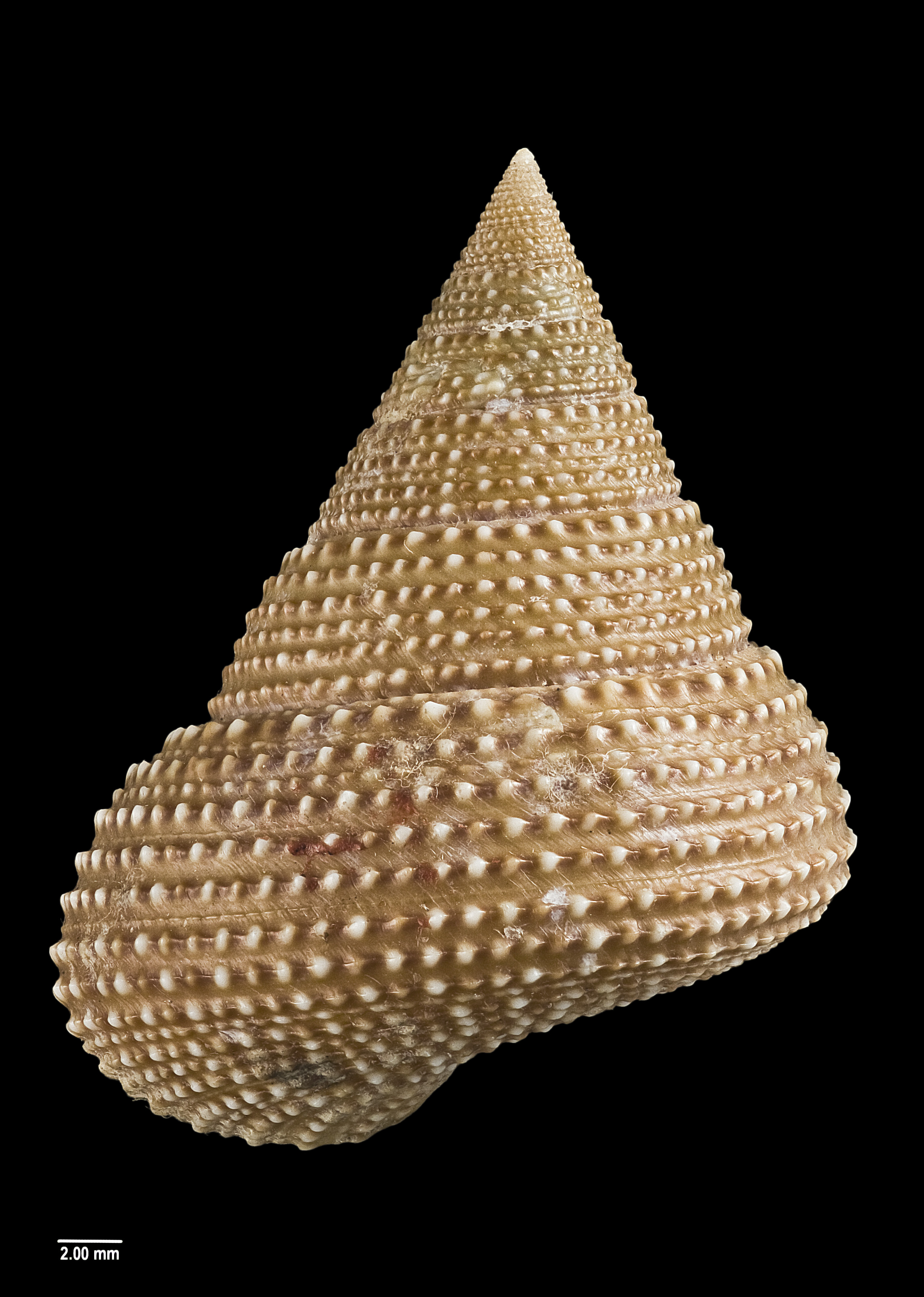

Scientific classification
- Kingdom: Animalia
- Phylum: Mollusca
- Class: Gastropoda
- Subclass: Vetigastropoda
- Order: Trochida
- Superfamily: Trochoidea
- Family: Calliostomatidae
- Genus: Maurea
- Species: M. osbornei

Binomial name
- Maurea osbornei (Powell, 1926)

Synonyms
- Calliostoma (Maurea) osbornei Powell, 1926; Calliostoma osbornei Powell, 1926

= Maurea osbornei =

Species of gastropod

Maurea osbornei is a species of sea snail, a marine gastropod mollusk, in the family Calliostomatidae within the superfamily Trochoidea, the top snails, turban snails and their allies.
