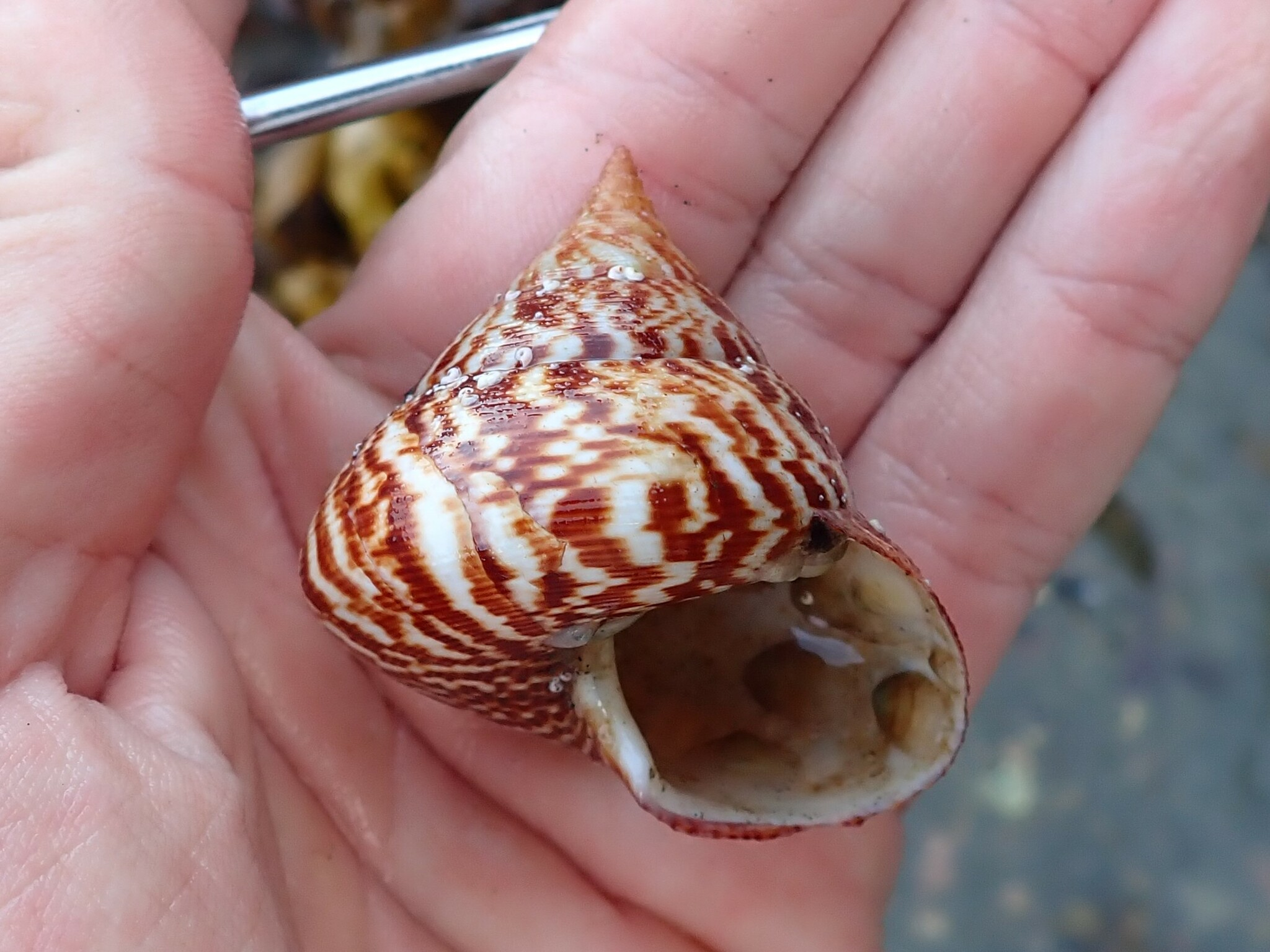

Scientific classification
- Kingdom: Animalia
- Phylum: Mollusca
- Class: Gastropoda
- Subclass: Vetigastropoda
- Order: Trochida
- Family: Calliostomatidae
- Genus: Maurea
- Species: M. tigris

Binomial name
- Maurea tigris (Gmelin, 1791)

Synonyms
- Calliostoma (Maurea) tigris (Gmelin, 1791); Calliostoma tigris (Gmelin, 1791); Trochus granatum Gmelin, 1791; Trochus tigris Gmelin, 1791; Venustas tigris (Gmelin, 1791); Venustas tigris chathamensis Dell, 1950

= Maurea tigris =

Species of gastropod

Maurea tigris, the tiger maurea, tiger top shell or tiger topsnail, is a species of sea snail, a marine gastropod mollusk, in the family Calliostomatidae within the superfamily Trochoidea, the top snails, turban snails and their allies.
