= List of gastropods described in 2010 =

This list of gastropods described in 2010, is a list of new taxa of snails and slugs of every kind that have been described (following the rules of the ICZN) during the year 2010. The list only includes taxa at the level of genus or species. For changes in taxonomy above the level of genus, see Changes in the taxonomy of gastropods since 2005.

There were described 1069 new species and subspecies of gastropods in 2010, 107 new genera and subgenera of gastropods and 11 new family group names (according to the literature that has been included into The Zoological Record).

== Fossil gastropods ==
from Paleontological Journal:

- Periaulax tsheganica Amitrov, 2010
- Pusillina kazakhstanica Amitrov, 2010

from Palaeontology

- Peracle charlotteae Janssen & Little, 2010
- new subgenus Proarcirsa (Schafbergia) Gatto & Monari, 2010
- Ataphrus cordevolensis Gatto & Monari, 2010
- Guidonia pseudorotula Gatto & Monari, 2010
- Proarcirsa (Schafbergia) zirettoensis Gatto & Monari, 2010
- Tectarius japigiae Esu & Girotti, 2010
- Hydrobia dubuissoni hydruntina Esu & Girotti, 2010
- Pseudamnicola messapica Esu & Girotti, 2010
- Pseudamnicola palmariggii Esu & Girotti, 2010
- Stenothyrella salentina Esu & Girotti, 2010

from Molluscan Research:

- Alvania baldoi Garilli & Parrinello, 2010
- Alvania dimitrii Garilli & Parrinello, 2010

== Marine gastropods ==
from Aldrovandia:

- Cerithiopsis oculisfictis Prkic & Mariottini, 2010
- Cerithiopsis petanii Prkic & Mariottini, 2010

from Archiv für Molluskenkunde:

- Niveria harriettae Fehse & Grego, 2010

from Basteria

- four new species of Cerithiopsis
- Lobatus ... ..., 2010

from Bulletin of Malacology, Taiwan:

- Babylonia hongkongensis Lai & Guo, 2010
- Siphonalia nigrobrunnea Lee & Chen, 2010

from Invertebrate Biology:

- Toledonia warenella Golding, 2010

from Molluscan Research:

- Epitonium smriglioi Bonfitto, 2010

from The Nautilus:

- Bolma castelinae Alf, Maestrati & Bouchet, 2010
- Bolma kreipli Alf, Maestrati & Bouchet, 2010
- Bolma mainbaza Alf, Maestrati & Bouchet, 2010
- Bolma pseudobathyraphis Alf, Maestrati & Bouchet, 2010
- Bolma tantalea Alf, Maestrati & Bouchet, 2010
- Calliostoma ceciliae ..., 2010
- Scabrotrophon hawaiiensis Houart & Moffitt, 2010
- Zeadmete atlantica Petit, L. D. Campbell & S. C. Campbell, 2010

from Novapex:

- Cirsotrema hertzae Garcia, 2010
- Cirsotrema skoglundae Garcia, 2010
- Cochlespira bevdeynzerae Garcia, 2010
- Cochlespira cavalier Garcia, 2010
- Cochlespira laurettamarrae Garcia, 2010
- Cochlespira leeana Garcia, 2010
- Mitromica gallegoi Rolán, Fernández-Garcés & Lee, 2010
- Schwartziella luisalvarezi Rolán & Fernández-Garcés, 2010
- Schwartziella nicaobesa Rolán & Fernández-Garcés, 2010
- Schwartziella yoguii Rolán & Fernández-Garcés, 2010
- Turritella nzimaorum Ryall & Vos, 2010
- Turritella wareni Ryall & Vos, 2010

from Proceedings of the Academy of Natural Sciences of Philadelphia:

- Prionovolva melonis Rosenberg, 2010

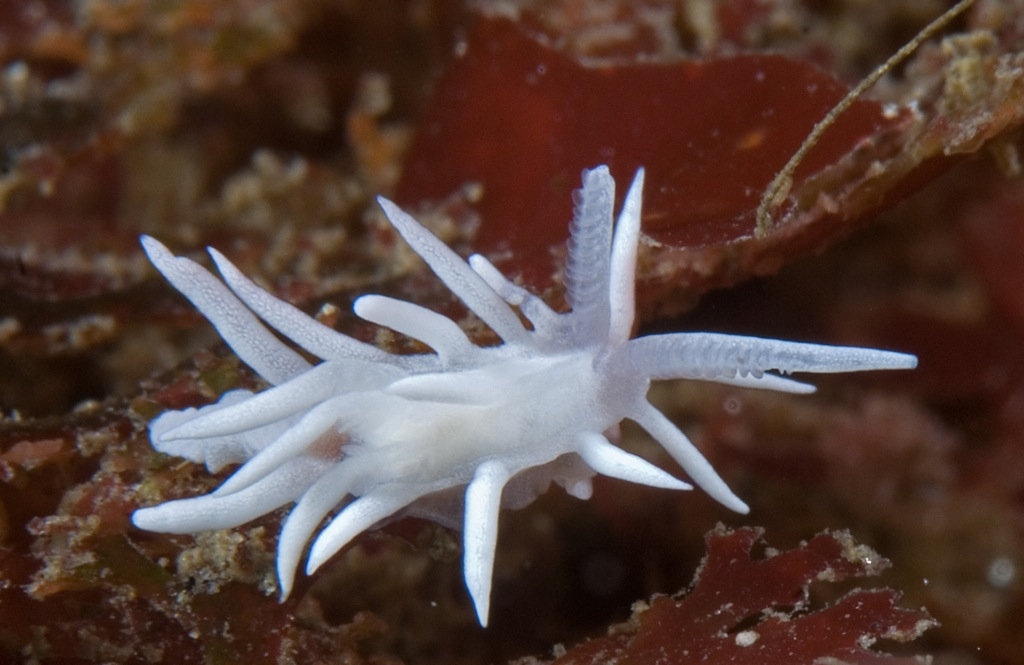
Okenia felis

from Proceedings of the California Academy of Sciences:

- Okenia felis Gosliner, 2010
- Flabellina goddardi Gosliner, 2010

from The Veliger:

- Anatoma ... ..., 2010
- Bostrycapulus heteropoma Collin & Rolán, 2010
- Hypselodoris juliae Dacosta, Padula & Schrödl, 2010
- new genus Trophonella Harasewych & Pastorino, 2010
- Trophonella rugosolamellata Harasewych & Pastorino, 2010

from Visaya:

- Dolichupis leei Fehse & Grego, 2010
- Dolichupis tindigei Fehse & Grego, 2010
- Dolichupis mediagibber Fehse & Grego, 2010
- Conus dorotheae Monnier & Limpalaër, 2010
- Plagiostropha rubrifaba Chino & Stahlschmidt, 2010
- Plagiostropha roseopinna Chino & Stahlschmidt, 2010
- Plagiostropha bicolor Chino & Stahlschmidt, 2010
- Plagiostropha vertigomaeniana Chino & Stahlschmidt, 2010

from Zootaxa:

- Sinezona kayae Geiger & McLean, 2010
- Sinezona hawaiiensis Geiger & McLean, 2010
- Sinezona carolarum Geiger & McLean, 2010
- Coronadoa demisispira Geiger & McLean, 2010
- Anatoma alternatisculpta Geiger & McLean, 2010
- Anatoma plicatazona Geiger & McLean, 2010
- Thieleella peruviana Geiger & McLean, 2010
- Thieleella bathypacifica Geiger & McLean, 2010

== Freshwater gastropods ==
from Archiv für Molluskenkunde:

- Pseudamnicola boucheti Glöer, Bouzid & Boeters, 2010
- Pseudamnicola chabii Glöer, Bouzid & Boeters, 2010
- Pseudamnicola ghamizii Glöer, Bouzid & Boeters, 2010
- Pseudamnicola algeriensis Glöer, Bouzid & Boeters, 2010
- Pseudamnicola gerhardfalkneri Glöer, Bouzid & Boeters, 2010
- Pseudamnicola calamensis Glöer, Bouzid & Boeters, 2010
- Pseudamnicola fineti Glöer, Bouzid & Boeters, 2010
- Pseudamnicola linae Glöer, Bouzid & Boeters, 2010
- Pseudamnicola rouagi Glöer, Bouzid & Boeters, 2010
- Mercuria bourguignati Glöer, Bouzid & Boeters, 2010
- Mercuria gauthieri Glöer, Bouzid & Boeters, 2010

from Biological Journal of the Linnean Society

- genus Madagasikara Köhler & Glaubrecht, 2010
- Madagasikara vazimba Köhler & Glaubrecht, 2010
- Madagasikara vivipara Köhler & Glaubrecht, 2010
- Madagasikara zazavavindrano Köhler & Glaubrecht, 2010

from Journal of Conchology

- Pseudobithynia ambrakis Glöer, Falnoiwski & Pešić, 2010
- Pseudobithynia euboeensis Glöer, Falnoiwski & Pešić, 2010
- Pseudobithynia zogari Glöer, Falnoiwski & Pešić, 2010

from Journal of Molluscan Studies

- Pyrgulopsis ignota Hershler, Liu & Lang, 2010

from Zoosystematics and Evolution

- Brotia yunnanensis Köhler, Du & Yang, 2010

from Zootaxa:

- Pyrgulopsis castaicensis Hershler & Liu, 2010
- Pyrgulopsis milleri Hershler & Liu, 2010

== Land gastropods ==
from Archiv für Molluskenkunde:

- Albinaria pondika Welter-Schultes, 2010
- genus Ptychauchenia Nordsieck, 2010
- Ptychauchenia panhai Nordsieck, 2010
- Grandinenia pallidissima Nordsieck, 2010
- Neniauchenia tonkinensis Nordsieck, 2010
- Columbinia elegans Nordsieck, 2010
- Columbinia elegantula Nordsieck, 2010
- Columbinia marcapatensis Nordsieck, 2010
- Columbinia hemmeni Nordsieck, 2010
- Neniella macrosoma Nordsieck, 2010
- Pseudogracilinenia pulchricosta Nordsieck, 2010
- Symptychiella acuminata Nordsieck, 2010
- Symptychiella fratermajor Nordsieck, 2010
- Incaglaia angrandi soukupi Nordsieck, 2010
- Incaglaia angrandi variegata Nordsieck, 2010
- Parabalea bicolor undaticosta Nordsieck, 2010
- Parabalea gibbosula grisea Nordsieck, 2010
- Parabalea latestriata queroensis Nordsieck, 2010
- Parabalea parcecostata meridionalis Nordsieck, 2010
- Peruinia peruana erythrostoma Nordsieck, 2010
- Pseudogracilinenia pulchricosta lamellicosta Nordsieck, 2010
- Symptychiella bilamellata costulata Nordsieck, 2010
- Symptychiella bilamellata gracilicosta Nordsieck, 2010
- Symptychiella bilamellata laevigata Nordsieck, 2010
- Acroptychia mahafinaritra
- Boucardicus anjarae
- Boucardicus avo
- Boucardicus hetra
- Boucardicus lalinify
- Boucardicus mahavariana
- Boucardicus matoatoa
- Boucardicus menoi
- Boucardicus peggyae
- Boucardicus pulchellus
- Boucardicus tantelyae
- Cyathopoma anjombona
- Cyathopoma hoditra
- Cyathopoma iridescens
- Cyathopoma madio
- Cyathopoma matsoko
- Fauxulus tsarakely
- Gulella andriantanteliae
- Gulella thompsoni
- Parvedentulina andriantanteliae
- Parvedentulina benjamini
- Parvedentulina jeani
- Parvedentulina paulayi
- Parvedentulina thompsoni
- Ampelita owengriffithsi
- Reticulapex michellae
- Kalidos gora
- Kalidos manotrika
- Kalidos manta
- Kaliella crandalli
- Microcystis albosuturalis
- Microcystis fotsifotsy
- Microcystis vony
- Sitala burchi
- Sitala mavo
- Sitala stanisici

from Genus:

- Montenegrina dofleini sinosi Páll-Gergely 2010

from Journal of Conchology

- Armenica (Armenica) laevicollis nemethi Páll-Gergely 2010
- Euxinastra (Odonteuxina) harchbelica Páll-Gergely 2010
- Strumosa strumosa erasmusi Páll-Gergely 2010

from Molluscan Research:

- Carinotrachia admirale Köhler, 2010 - with two of its subspecies: Carinotrachia admirale admirale Köhler, 2010 and Carinotrachia admirale elevata Köhler, 2010
- Kimberleydiscus Köhler, 2010 - with the only one species Kimberleydiscus fasciatus Köhler, 2010
- Kimberleymelon Köhler, 2010 - with the only one species Kimberleymelon tealei Köhler, 2010

from The Nautilus:

- Staala gwaii Ovaska, Chichester & Sopuck, 2010
- Holospira fergusoni Gilbertson & Naranjo-García, 2010

from The Raffles Bulletin of Zoology:

- Amphidromus abbasi Chan & Tan, 2010 - this a validation of nomen nudum published in 2008.
- Amphidromus rottiensis Chan & Tan, 2010 - this a validation of nomen nudum published in 2008.

from Revista de Biología Tropical:

- Rectaxis pagodus Thompson, 2010
- Volutaxis (Volutaxis) eburneus Thompson, 2010

from Records of the Australian Museum:

- Amplirhagada anderdonensis Köhler, 2010
- Amplirhagada basilica Köhler, 2010
- Amplirhagada berthierana Köhler, 2010
- Amplirhagada boongareensis Köhler, 2010
- Amplirhagada buffonensis Köhler, 2010
- Amplirhagada camdenensis Köhler, 2010
- Amplirhagada decora Köhler, 2010
- Amplirhagada descartesana Köhler, 2010
- Amplirhagada dubitabile Köhler, 2010
- Amplirhagada euroa Köhler, 2010
- Amplirhagada gemina Köhler, 2010
- Amplirhagada gibsoni Köhler, 2010
- Amplirhagada indistincta Köhler, 2010
- Amplirhagada kessneri Köhler, 2010
- Amplirhagada kimberleyana Köhler, 2010
- Amplirhagada lamarckiana Köhler, 2010
- Amplirhagada mckenziei Köhler, 2010
- Amplirhagada montesqieuana Köhler, 2010
- Amplirhagada ponderi Köhler, 2010
- Amplirhagada puescheli Köhler, 2010
- Amplirhagada regia Köhler, 2010
- Amplirhagada solemiana Köhler, 2010
- Amplirhagada sphaeroidea Köhler, 2010
- Amplirhagada tricenaria Köhler, 2010
- Amplirhagada uwinsensis Köhler, 2010
- Amplirhagada yorkensis Köhler, 2010

from Ruthenica:

- Columella talgarica Schileyko & Rymzhanov, 2010
- Leucozonella corona Schileyko & Rymzhanov, 2010
- Angiomphalia nucula Schileyko & Rymzhanov, 2010

from Tuhinga:

- Atropis rarotongana Brook, 2010
- Minidonta aroa Brook, 2010
- Minidonta arorangi Brook, 2010
- Minidonta iota Brook, 2010
- Minidonta kavera Brook, 2010
- Minidonta matavera Brook, 2010
- Minidonta ngatangiia Brook, 2010
- Minidonta pue Brook, 2010
- Minidonta rutaki Brook, 2010
- Sinployea muri Brook, 2010
- Sinployea taipara Brook, 2010
- Sinployea titikaveka Brook, 2010
- Sinployea tupapa Brook, 2010
- Nesopupa rarotonga Brook, 2010

from Zootaxa:

- four new subspecies of Abida secale
- Chondrina ingae Kokshoorn & Gittenberger, 2010
- Chondrina marjae Kokshoorn & Gittenberger, 2010
- Chondrina pseudavenacea Kokshoorn & Gittenberger, 2010
- Chondrina arigonoides Kokshoorn & Gittenberger, 2010
- Plekocheilus vlceki Breure & Schlögl, 2010
- Plekocheilus breweri Breure & Schlögl, 2010

from Zoological Journal of the Linnean Society:

- a new family Diapheridae Panha & Naggs, 2010 have been established within Streptaxoidea.
- Diaphera prima Panha, 2010

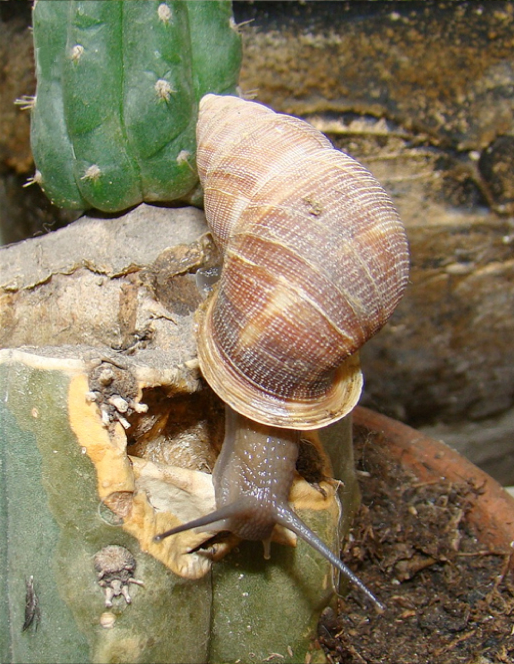
Scutalus mariopenai

from Zoologische Mededelingen:

- Bostryx chusgonensis sipas Breure & Mogollón Avilla, 2010
- Bostryx fragilis Breure & Mogollón Avilla, 2010
- Scutalus mariopenai Breure & Mogollón Avilla, 2010
- Scutalus phaeocheilus altoensis Breure & Mogollón Avilla, 2010

from Zoology in the Middle East:

- Schileykula attilae Páll-Gergely, 2010
- Monacha georgievi Páll-Gergely, 2010

== See also ==
- List of gastropods described in the 2000s
- List of gastropods described in 2011
