= List of gastropods described in 2011 =

This list of gastropods described in 2011, is a list of new taxa of snails and slugs of every kind that have been described (following the rules of the ICZN) during the year 2011. The list only includes taxa at the level of genus or species. For changes in taxonomy above the level of genus, see Changes in the taxonomy of gastropods since 2005.

== Fossil gastropods ==
from Basteria:

- Limacina asiatica (Janssen in Janssen et al., 2011)
- Limacina dzheroiensis (Janssen in Janssen et al., 2011)

from Molluscan Research:

- Latia manuherikia Marshall, 2011

== Marine gastropods ==
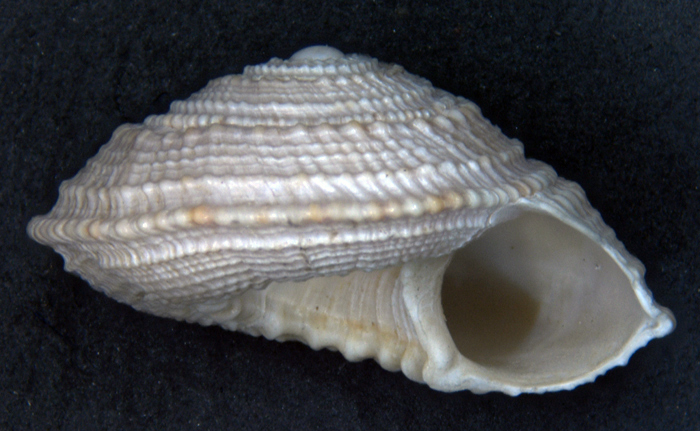
An empty shell of Solatisonax cabrali

from Basteria:

- Coralliophila luglii Smriglio & Mariottini, 2011

from Journal of Molluscan Studies:

- Corambe mancorensis Martynov et al., 2011
- new family Horaiclavidae Bouchet, Kantor, Sysoev & Puillandre, 2011

from Molluscan Research:

- Satondella dantarti Luque, Geiger & Rolan, 2011
- Satondella cachoi Luque, Geiger & Rolan, 2011
- Merelina hirta Criscione & Ponder, 2011
- Merelina cancellata Criscione & Ponder, 2011
- Merelina lordhowensis Criscione & Ponder, 2011
- Merelina norfolkensis Criscione & Ponder, 2011

from PLoS ONE:

- Pseudunela marteli Neusser, Jörger & Schrödl, 2011
- Pseudunela viatoris Neusser, Jörger & Schrödl, 2011

from Proceedings of the Academy of Natural Sciences of Philadelphia:

- Lienardia sp.

from Ruthenica:

- Lienardia acrolineata Fedosov, 2011
- Lienardia grandiradula Fedosov, 2011
- Lienardia multicolor Fedosov, 2011
- Lienardia roseangulata Fedosov, 2011
- Lienardia tagaroae Fedosov, 2011

from Tropical Zoology:

- Heliacus willianseverii Tenório, Barros, Francisco & Silva, 2011
- Pseudotorinia jonasi Tenório, Barros, Francisco & Silva, 2011
- Psilaxis clertoni Tenório, Barros, Francisco & Silva, 2011
- Solatisonax cabrali Tenório, Barros, Francisco & Silva, 2011
- Solatisonax rudigerbieleri Tenório, Barros, Francisco & Silva, 2011

from Zootaxa:

- Eulimella torquata Pimenta, Dos Santos & Absalão, 2011
- Eulimella cylindrata Pimenta, Dos Santos & Absalão, 2011
- Eulimella ejuncida Pimenta, Dos Santos & Absalão, 2011*

from Invertebrate Systematics:

- Dendronotus patricki Stout, Wilson & Valdés, 2011

== Freshwater gastropods ==
from Journal of Molluscan Studies:

- Pseudotryonia mica Hershler, Liu & Landye, 2011
- Pseudotryonia pasajae Hershler, Liu & Landye, 2011
- Chorrobius Hershler, Liu & Landye, 2011
- Chorrobius crassilabrum Hershler, Liu & Landye, 2011
- Minckleyella Hershler, Liu & Landye, 2011
- Minckleyella balnearis Hershler, Liu & Landye, 2011

from Molluscan Research:

- Trochotaia pyramidella Du, Yang & Chen, 2011

from Parasites & Vectors

- Lymnaea meridensis Bargues, Artigas & Mas-Coma, 2011

from Zoologica Scripta:

- Sulawesidrobia perempuan Zielske, Glaubrecht & Haase, 2011
- Sulawesidrobia soedjatmokoi Zielske, Glaubrecht & Haase, 2011
- Sulawesidrobia mahalonaensis Zielske, Glaubrecht & Haase, 2011
- Sulawesidrobia anceps Zielske, Glaubrecht & Haase, 2011
- Sulawesidrobia bicolor Zielske, Glaubrecht & Haase, 2011
- Sulawesidrobia megalodon Zielske, Glaubrecht & Haase, 2011
- Sulawesidrobia abreui Zielske, Glaubrecht & Haase, 2011
- Sulawesidrobia datar Zielske, Glaubrecht & Haase, 2011
- Sulawesidrobia yunusi Zielske, Glaubrecht & Haase, 2011
- Sulawesidrobia towutiensis Zielske, Glaubrecht & Haase, 2011

from Zootaxa:

- Tryonia allendae Hershler, Liu & Landye, 2011
- Tryonia angosturae Hershler, Liu & Landye, 2011
- Tryonia chuviscarae Hershler, Liu & Landye, 2011
- Tryonia contrerasi Hershler, Liu & Landye, 2011
- Tryonia julimesensis Hershler, Liu & Landye, 2011
- Tryonia metcalfi Hershler, Liu & Landye, 2011
- Tryonia minckleyi Hershler, Liu & Landye, 2011
- Tryonia molinae Hershler, Liu & Landye, 2011
- Tryonia oasiensis Hershler, Liu & Landye, 2011
- Tryonia ovata Hershler, Liu & Landye, 2011
- Tryonia peregrina Hershler, Liu & Landye, 2011
- Tryonia taylori Hershler, Liu & Landye, 2011
- Tryonia zaragozae Hershler, Liu & Landye, 2011

== Land gastropods ==
from Archiv für Molluskenkunde:

- Napaeus delicatus Alonso, Yanes & Ibáñez, 2011
- Napaeus minimus Holyoak & Holyoak, 2011

from Basteria:

- Charpentieria clavata triumplinae Nardi, 2011
- Tanzartemon seddonae Tattersfield & Rowson, 2011
- Tanzartemon Tattersfield & Rowson, 2011
- Tanzartemon mkungwensis Tattersfield & Rowson, 2011
- Helicina duo Breure, 2011

from Journal of Conchology:

- Balcanodiscus (Balcanodiscus) danyii Erőss, Fehér & Páll-Gergely, 2011
- Napaeus alucensis Santana & Yanes, 2011
- Napaeus gomerensis G. A. Holyoak & D. T. Holyoak, 2011
- Napaeus moroi Martín, Alonso & Ibáñez, 2011
- Napaeus torilensis Artiles & Deniz, 2011

from Malacologia:

- genus Australocosmica Köhler, 2011
- Australocosmica augustae Köhler, 2011
- Australocosmica sanctumpatriciusae Köhler, 2011
- Australocosmica vulcanica Köhler, 2011
- Amplirhagada globosa Köhler, 2011
- Amplirhagada sinenomine Köhler, 2011
- Amplirhagada storriana Köhler, 2011
- Amplirhagada alkuonides Köhler, 2011
- Kimboraga glabra Köhler, 2011
- Kimboraga wulalam Köhler, 2011
- Kimboraga cascadensis Köhler, 2011
- Globorhagada confusa Köhler, 2011
- Globorhagada wurroolgu Köhler, 2011
- Globorhagada yoowadan Köhler, 2011
- Globorhagada uwinsensis Köhler, 2011
- Rhagada biggeana Köhler, 2011
- Rhagada kessneri Köhler, 2011
- Rhagada sheaei Köhler, 2011
- Rhagada felicitas Köhler, 2011
- Rhagada dominica Köhler, 2011
- Rhagada primigena Köhler, 2011
- Retroterra aequabilis Köhler, 2011
- Retroterra discoidea Köhler, 2011
- Retroterra acutocostata Köhler, 2011
- genus Molema Köhler, 2011
- Molema stankowskii Köhler, 2011
- Baudinella thielei Köhler, 2011
- Baudinella boongareensis Köhler, 2011
- Baudinella tuberculata Köhler, 2011
- Baudinella setobaudinioides Köhler, 2011
- Baudinella occidentalis Köhler, 2011
- Setobaudinia kalumburuana Köhler, 2011
- Setobaudinia herculea Köhler, 2011
- Setobaudinia ngurraali Köhler, 2011
- Setobaudinia umbadayi Köhler, 2011
- Setobaudinia wuyurru Köhler, 2011
- Setobaudinia capillacea Köhler, 2011
- Setobaudinia garlinju Köhler, 2011
- Setobaudinia gumalamala Köhler, 2011
- Setobaudinia insolita Köhler, 2011
- Setobaudinia quinta Köhler, 2011
- Setobaudinia joycei Köhler, 2011
- Setobaudinia karczewski Köhler, 2011
- Torresitrachia aquilonia Köhler, 2011
- Torresitrachia eclipsis Köhler, 2011
- Torresitrachia janszi Köhler, 2011
- Torresitrachia urvillei Köhler, 2011
- Torresitrachia brookei Köhler, 2011
- Torresitrachia baudini Köhler, 2011
- Torresitrachia allouarni Köhler, 2011
- Torresitrachia flindersi Köhler, 2011
- Torresitrachia freycineti Köhler, 2011
- Torresitrachia tasmani Köhler, 2011
- Torresitrachia houtmani houtmani Köhler, 2011
- Torresitrachia houtmani dampieri Köhler, 2011
- Torresitrachia leichhardti Köhler, 2011
- Torresitrachia hartogi Köhler, 2011
- Torresitrachia girgarinae Köhler, 2011
- genus Kimberleytrachia Köhler, 2011
- Kimberleytrachia somniator Köhler, 2011
- Kimberleytrachia alphacentauri Köhler, 2011
- Kimberleytrachia aequum Köhler, 2011
- Kimberleytrachia canopi Köhler, 2011
- Kimberleytrachia chartacea Köhler, 2011
- Kimberleytrachia hirsuta Köhler, 2011
- Kimberleytrachia achernaria Köhler, 2011
- Kimberleytrachia amplirhagadoides Köhler, 2011

from Records of the Australian Museum:

- Amplirhagada atlantis Köhler, 2011
- Amplirhagada carsoniana Köhler, 2011
- Amplirhagada alicunda Köhler, 2011
- Amplirhagada moraniana Köhler, 2011
- Amplirhagada davidsoniana Köhler, 2011
- Amplirhagada vialae Köhler, 2011
- Amplirhagada discoidea Köhler, 2011
- Amplirhagada forrestiana Köhler, 2011
- Amplirhagada inusitata Köhler, 2011
- Amplirhagada coffea Köhler, 2011
- Amplirhagada gardneriana Köhler, 2011
- Amplirhagada lindsayae Köhler, 2011
- Amplirhagada bendraytoni Köhler, 2011
- Amplirhagada angustocauda Köhler, 2011
- Amplirhagada epiphallica Köhler, 2011

from The Veliger

- Hendersoniella miquihuanae Thompson & Correa-Sandoval, 2011

from Zootaxa:

- Napaeus aringaensis Yanes et al., 2011
- Napaeus grohi Yanes et al., 2011
- Napaeus josei Yanes et al., 2011
- Napaeus validoi Yanes et al., 2011
- Napaeus venegueraensis Yanes et al., 2011
- Plectotropis yonganensis Zhou, Xiao, Chen & Wang, 2011

== See also ==
- List of gastropods described in the 2000s
- List of gastropods described in 2010
- List of gastropods described in 2012
