= Malacologia =

- Discipline: Malacology
- Language: English
- Edited by: Charles Lydeard

Publication details
- History: 1962–present
- Publisher: Institute of Malacology (United States)
- Frequency: Irregular
- Impact factor: 1.3 (2022)

Standard abbreviations
- ISO 4: Malacologia

Indexing
- CODEN: MALAAJ
- ISSN: 0076-2997
- LCCN: 67122037
- OCLC no.: 01696513

Links
- Journal homepage; Online access to volumes 1–48 (2006); volumes 49–61 (2006–2017)

Malacologia is a peer-reviewed scientific journal in the field of malacology, the study of mollusks. The journal publishes articles in the fields of molluscan systematics, ecology, population ecology, genetics, molecular genetics, evolution, and phylogenetics. The editor-in-chief is Charles Lydeard (Morehead State University).

The journal specializes in publishing long papers and monographs. The journal publishes at least one, sometimes two, volumes of about 400 pages per year, which may consist of 1 or 2 issues. According to the Journal Citation Reports, its 2022 impact factor is 1.3. This ranks Malacologia 81st out of 177 listed journals in the category "Zoology". The journal started publication in 1962.

== See also ==
- Archiv für Molluskenkunde
- Basteria
- Journal of Conchology
- Journal of Molluscan Studies
- The Nautilus
