= Arthur Erskine Ellis =

British scientist, biologist and naturalist (1902–1983)

- Born: 1 October 1902; Bangalore, India
- Died: 28 February 1983 (aged 80); Alphington, Exeter, England
- Education: Oxford University
- Awards: Fellow of the Linnean Society, 1931, H. H. Bloomer Award, 1970; Fellow of the Zoological Society of London, Stamford Raffles Award for 1974
- Scientific career
- Fields: Malacology, natural history

Arthur Erskine Ellis (1 October 1902 – 28 February 1983), often known as A.E. Ellis, was a British scientist, biologist and naturalist. Ellis is best known for his large number of malacological publications, including some which became essential texts on the subject of British non-marine malacology. To a lesser extent, Ellis published papers about other land invertebrates and various aspects of the fauna and flora of Britain. In addition Ellis had five ghost stories published.

Ellis was also a plant collector. From 1919 to 1961 he contributed specimens of spermatophytes to a number of different herbariums in Britain.

Stella Turk, the British naturalist said about Ellis, "It is difficult to categorise people. Should one even try? We are all multiple in a singular way!"; she also commented, "As might have been expected, he wrote his own obituary in which he gives a broad outline of his life and very lengthy bibliography", (J. Conch. 31 1983).

== Taxa named in his honour ==
Two taxa were named in Ellis' honour:

- Limicolariopsis ellisi Crowley & Pain, 1964 (Rev. Zool. Bot, Afr. 69: 191) -- a large African land snail
- Pisidium (Afropisidium) ellisi Dance, 1967 (J. Conch. 26: 178) -- a small freshwater clam

== Publications ==
=== Books ===
A.E. Ellis published several books which were the standard reference texts for identifying the non-marine Mollusca of Great Britain and Ireland during most of the 20th century:

- British Snails, a guide to the non-marine Gastropoda of Great Britain and Ireland, Pleistocene to Recent, 1926, reprinted in 1969, Oxford University Press
- Key to Land Shells of Great Britain
- British Freshwater Bivalve Mollusca (Synopses of the British fauna; new series, number 11)

=== Papers ===
Publications on non-marine mollusca and obituaries of conchologists:

JC = Journal of Conchology. PMS = Proceedings of the Malacological Society (London)

- 1924 Mollusca of Flamborough. JC 17: 149–153
- 1924 Notes on some British Helicidae, JC 17: 162–167
- 1924 Land Mollusca on the Mewstone, JC 17: 187–188
- 1924 Mollusca in the neighbourhood of Market Harborough, JC 17: 188–192, 212–219; 18:8
- 1925 Experimental acclimatisation of Sabinea ulvae (Pennant) to freshwater, Ann. & Mag. Nat. Hist. 15: 96–7
- 1925 The invalidity of Sabinea Sowerby. ibid. 16: 48–49
- 1926 Planorbis (Gyraulus) acronicus Férussac at Oxford. JC 18: 52–53
- 1926 British Snails. Clarendon Press (2nd edition, 1969).
- 1926 Helix draparnaudi Sheppard, and Planorbis draparnaldi Jeffreys. JC 18: 54
- 1926 Notes on some land Molluscs from Land's End. PMS 17: 123–6
- 1927 Variation in Trichia liberta (Westerlund).JC 18: 118
- 1927 Additional notes on the Molluscs of the Oxford district. JC 18: 137–8
- 1927 An abnormality in Lymnaea stagnalis (Linn.).JC 18: 139
- 1927 The snail as a zoological type, School Science Review No. 34: 102–110
- 1928 Vertigo moulinsiana (Dupuy) near Norwich. JC 18: 208
- 1928 Planorbis vorticulus Troschel in West Sussex. PMS 18: 127
- 1929 A garden fauna. JC 18: 312
- 1930 Mollusca on Gateholm. JC 19: 61
- 1931 A reclaimed saltmarsh. PMS 19: 278–9
- 1931 Molluscs of Wicken Fen [note]. JC 19: 170
- 1931 Notes on some Norfolk Molluscs. JC 19: 177–8
- 1931 (with D. Aubertin & G. C. Robson) The natural history and variation of the Pointed Snail, Cochlicella acuta (Müll.). Proc. Zool. Soc. Lond. for 1930: 1027–1055, pl. 1
- 1932 The habitats of Hydrobiidae in the Adur estuary. PMS 20: 11–18
- 1932 Further localities for Planorbis vorticulus Troschel. JC 19: 258–9
- 1939 A Surrey Bronze Age interment. JC 21: 90
- 1939 A discussion on the variation of Lymnaea, etc. PMS 23: 313
- 1940 The identification of the British species of Pisidium. PMS 24: 44–88, pl. 3–6
- 1940 Some Devon land snails. JC 21: 190
- 1941 The Mollusca of a Norfolk broad (presidential address). JC 21: 224–243
- 1941 Ecological notes. JC 21: 258–9
- 1941 Anodonta minima Millet in Norfolk. JC 21: 280
- 1942 Milax gracilis (Leydig) in woodland. JC 21: 325–6
- 1945 Limax flavus L. in a 'wild' habitat. JC 22: 135
- 1946 Milax sowerbyi (Fér.) in woodland. JC 22: 177
- 1946 On Potomida Swainson. PMS 27: 105–8, pl. 7
- 1946 Freshwater bivalves (Mollusca). Corbicula, Sphaerium, Dreissena. Linn. Soc. Synopses of the British Fauna, No. 4
- 1947 Freshwater bivalves (Mollusca): Unionacea. ibid. No. 5
- 1947 Retinella nitidula (Drap.) monstr. sinistrorsum. JC 22: 271
- 1947 Dimensions of Anodonta minima Millet. JC 22: 271
- 1948 The survey of Bookham Common. Land Mollusca of Bookham Common. London Naturalist for 1947: 56–59
- 1949 A Broadland slug [Agriolimax agrestis L.] Transactions of the Norfolk & Norwich Nature Society. 16: 388
- 1950 Succinea putris (L.) parasitized by Leucochloridium. JC 23: 107
- 1950 The type species of Testacella. JC 23: 115
- 1951 R. Winckworth, obituary. JC 23: 157–62
- 1954 Volvulus Oken. JC 23: 394
- 1959 E. W. Swanton, obituary. JC 24: 326
- 1961 Land and freshwater Mollusca in Norwich and its region, p. 73. British Association. Jarrold, Norwich
- 1961 H. H. Bloomer, obituary. Proc. Linn. Soc. Lond. 172nd session: part 1.
- 1962 British freshwater bivalve Molluscs. Linn. Soc. Synopses of British fauna, No. 13
- 1964 L. W. Grensted, obituary. JC 25: 291–3, pl. 20
- 1964 Arion lusitanicus Mabille in Cornwall. JC 25: 285–287
- 1964 Milax budapestensis (Hazay) in woodland. JC 25: 298
- 1965 Arion lusitanicus Mabille in Devon. JC 25: 345–347
- 1967 Agriolimax agrestis (L.): some observations. JC 25: 345–7
- 1978 British freshwater bivalve Molluscs, Linn. Soc. Synopses of British Fauna (New Series) No. 11

Conchological Society; Papers for Students

- No. 3 (1964). Key to land shells of Great Britain.
- No. 3 (2nd edition, 1974). Key to the land snails of the British Isles.
- No. 12 (1969). Key to British slugs

Publications in the Conchologists' Newsletter:

- 1961 Land and freshwater snails, additions to the British list, 3:12–13
- 1962 Biographical note, 4:16
- 1964 Some etymology, 9:50–51
- 1964 Sinistrosity, 9:53–54
- 1964 Snails extinct in England, but living abroad, 11:68–69
- 1964 Posting living molluscs, 11:68–69
- 1966 (with Stella Turk), Cornish localities for Arion lusitanicus 16:108
- 1967 Conkers and conchology, 20:138–139
- 1967 Nesovitrea hammonis and N. petronella, 21:6
- 1967 Unorthodox orthography, 22:15–16
- 1967 Poems on Conchology, 22:24–25
- 1968 Arion lusitanicus in Ireland, 25:40–41
- 1968 Metamerism, 25:47
- 1968 Pronunciation, 27:65–66
- 1969 Snail-eating dragons, 31:13 122
- 1970 Slugs and the poets, 35:185–186
- 1971 Names of British marine molluscs, 37:205–206
- 1971 Slugs and the poets, 39:233–234
- 1972 Blueprint for peace, 43:289
- 1972 Such numbers of snails, 43:289
- 1973 Who is Brittannia? What is She? 4.44:302
- 1973 Perils of the deep, 44:310
- 1973 Footnote to, Who is Britannia, 44:313
- 1973 An Old English Riddle, 45:316–317
- 1973 Hooper's hypothesis, 45:323
- 1973 Biographical and historical footnotes, 45:323
- 1973 Cochlea liberum, the snail in old nursery rhymes, 47:346–348
- 1974 Paradise lost? 49:373
- 1974 First record of Arion lusitanicus in Ireland, 49:384
- 1974 Review, From the diary of a snail, Günter Grass, 50:393–394
- 1974 First record of Arion lusitanicus in Ireland, 50:395
- 1974 Excelsior: the snail ascending, 51:398–399
- 1975 Place names with a molluscan flavour, 52:412–414
- 1975 Why collect shells? 53:434–435
- 1975 Pestalozzian conchology, a note, 54:449–450
- 1975 Shells as musical instruments, 55:460–461
- 1975 The snail in 19th century verse, 55:464–466
- 1975 Pestalozzian conchology, 55:469
- 1976 L'escargot, 58:519-520
- 1976 Molluscan place names: supplement, 58:520–521
- 1976 Correction to an Old English Riddle, 58:521
- 1977 Shells murmurs, 71:189-190. 62:33–34
- 1977 The mollusc in fables, 63:44–46
- 1978 Shakespeare and sea shells, 67:105–106
- 1979 Adventure of a snail hunter, 69:153–154
- 1979 Poem on the limpet, 71:182–183
- 1979 Snails and slugs in Shakespeare, 71:189–190
- 1981 Cassel's Natural History, 76:309–310.
- 1982 Celebrities in shells, 81:9
- 1982 Concerning Captain Thomas Brown, 82:35–36
- 1982 Sue Wells, international trade in ornamental shells, 83:56
