= Guidonia =

Guidonia may refer to:

- Guidonia Montecelio, an Italian town
- Guidonia P.Browne, a synonym of the plant genus Laetia
- Guidonia (DC.) Griseb. and Guidonia Mill., both synonyms of the plant genus Samyda
- Guidonia (gastropod), an extinct genus; see List of gastropods described in 2010
