= Stella Turk =

British zoologist

Stella Maris Turk
- Born: Stella Maris Treharne; 27 March 1925; Isles of Scilly, England
- Died: 3 April 2017 (aged 92)
- Spouse: Frank Turk
- Awards: Stamford Raffles Award
- Scientific career
- Fields: Zoology, natural history, conservation
- Workplaces: University of Exeter

Stella Maris Turk, MBE (27 March 1925 – 3 April 2017) was a British zoologist, naturalist, and conservationist. She is known for her activities in marine biology and conservation, particularly as it applies to marine molluscs and mammals. Turk became a Member of the Most Excellent Order of the British Empire in 2002, and was awarded the Stamford Raffles Award by the Zoological Society of London in 1979.

== History ==
Stella Turk was born in 1925 on the Isles of Scilly, some distance off the western tip of Cornwall, Great Britain. She was born Stella Maris Treharne; her first two names, "Stella Maris", are a Latin phrase meaning "star of the sea", a title sometimes given to the Virgin Mary. Although Turk lived in New Zealand as a small child, she primarily grew up in Cornwall, and spent most of her life living in and researching in the Duchy of Cornwall. Turk was a working scientist and a published zoologist. In addition she worked with her late husband biologist Frank Turk in the field of adult education.

Stella Turk and Frank Turk founded the "Cornish Biological Record Unit" at the University of Exeter's Institute of Cornish Studies. This was later incorporated into the Cornwall Wildlife Trust. Turk served as the British Isles National Recorder for marine molluscs for the Conchological Society of Great Britain & Ireland, as well as the Strandings Recorder (i.e. strandings of marine mammals, other marine vertebrates, and in fact any unusual organisms) for the Cornish Biological Records Unit. She was a major contributor to the Red Data Book for Cornwall and the Isles of Scilly (editor Adrian Spalding), as the author of thirty-six sections including many of the unusual and under-recorded animals such as Thorn-skins (Kinorhyncha) and Entoprocta. For many years, she wrote a nature column in the West Briton.

In 1979, Turk was awarded the Stamford Raffles Award by the Zoological Society of London "For contributions to the study of seahorse life and marine molluscs".

In 1980 Turk was awarded an honorary Master of Science (MSc) from the University of Exeter.

Turk was awarded an MBE in the 2003 New Year Honours List, "For services to Nature Conservation, Cornwall, while holding office as Strandings Recorder".

A film celebrating her tireless contribution was shown in 2013.

In 2025 she was selected as one of the "50 Women of Cornwall" in a project organised by the Art Centre Penryn.

== Publications ==
Turk's publications include:

- Turk, S.M. "Cornish Marine Conchology", Journal of Conchology: vol. 31, part 3, 1983
- Turk, S.M. "Edward Step and the Long Drang, Portscatho, Cornwall". The Conchologists’ Newsletter 70: 159–162. 1979.
- Turk, S.M. Introduction to Seashore Life in Cornwall and the Isles of Scilly (D.B. Barton, May 1970)
- Turk, S.M. Collecting Shells (Foyle, 1966)

In 1966, Turk co-wrote a paper with Arthur Erskine Ellis:

- Cornish localities for Arion lusitanicus, The Conchologists' Newsletter 16:108

== See also ==
- Frank Turk, her husband and collaborator on conservation issues
