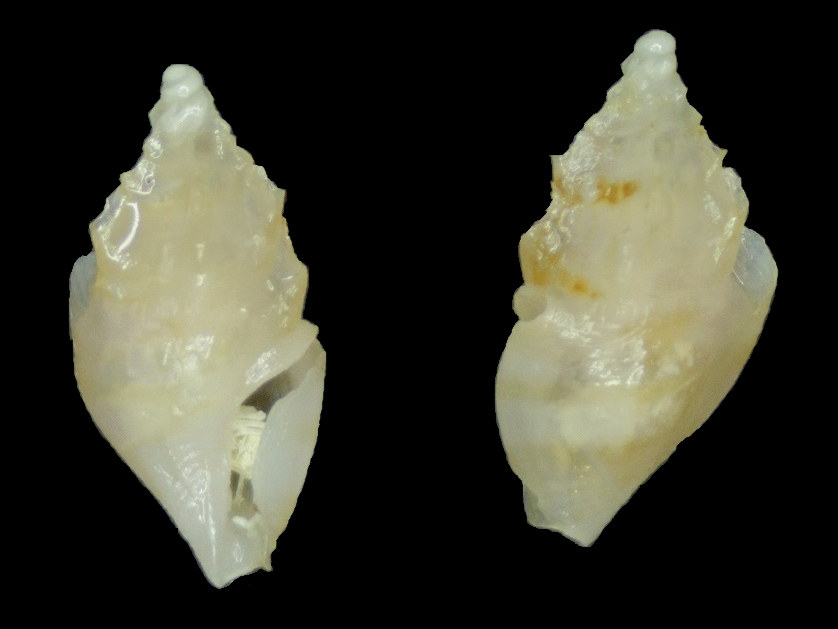
- Shell of Plagiostropha vertigomaeniana

Scientific classification
- Kingdom: Animalia
- Phylum: Mollusca
- Class: Gastropoda
- Subclass: Caenogastropoda
- Order: Neogastropoda
- Superfamily: Conoidea
- Family: Drilliidae
- Genus: Plagiostropha; Melvill, 1927

Type species
- Plagiostropha quintuplex Melvill, 1927

Species
- See text

= Plagiostropha =

Genus of gastropods

Plagiostropha is a genus of sea snails, marine gastropod mollusks in the family Drilliidae.

== Species ==
Species within the genus Plagiostropha include:

- Plagiostropha alboscala Chino & Stahlschmidt, 2020
- Plagiostropha bicolor Chino & Stahlschmidt, 2010
- Plagiostropha brevifusca Chino & Stahlschmidt, 2020
- Plagiostropha caledoniensis (Wells, 1995)
- Plagiostropha chrysotincta Chino & Stahlschmidt, 2020
- Plagiostropha costata (Wells, 1995)
- Plagiostropha decapitata Chino & Stahlschmidt, 2020
- Plagiostropha flexus (Shuto, 1983)
- Plagiostropha hexagona (Wells, 1995)
- Plagiostropha opalus (Reeve, 1845)
- Plagiostropha quintuplex Melvill, 1927
- Plagiostropha roseopinna Chino & Stahlschmidt, 2010
- Plagiostropha rubrifaba Chino & Stahlschmidt, 2010
- Plagiostropha sinecosta Wells, 1991
- Plagiostropha vertigomaeniana Chino & Stahlschmidt, 2010

Species brought into synonymy

- Plagiostropha gibberula (Hervier, 1896): synonym of Drillia gibberulus (Hervier, 1896)
- Plagiostropha turrita Wells, 1995: synonym of Splendrillia turrita (Wells, 1995)
