= Plagiostropha sinecosta =

Scientific classification
- Kingdom: Animalia
- Phylum: Mollusca
- Class: Gastropoda
- Subclass: Caenogastropoda
- Order: Neogastropoda
- Superfamily: Conoidea
- Family: Drilliidae
- Genus: Plagiostropha
- Species: P. sinecosta

Binomial name
- Plagiostropha sinecosta Wells, 1991

Species of gastropod

Plagiostropha sinecosta is a species of sea snail, a marine gastropod mollusk in the family Drilliidae.

== Distribution ==
This marine species is endemic to Australia and occurs in the demersal zone off Port Hedland, Western Australia, Australia at a depth of 200 metres (660 ft).
