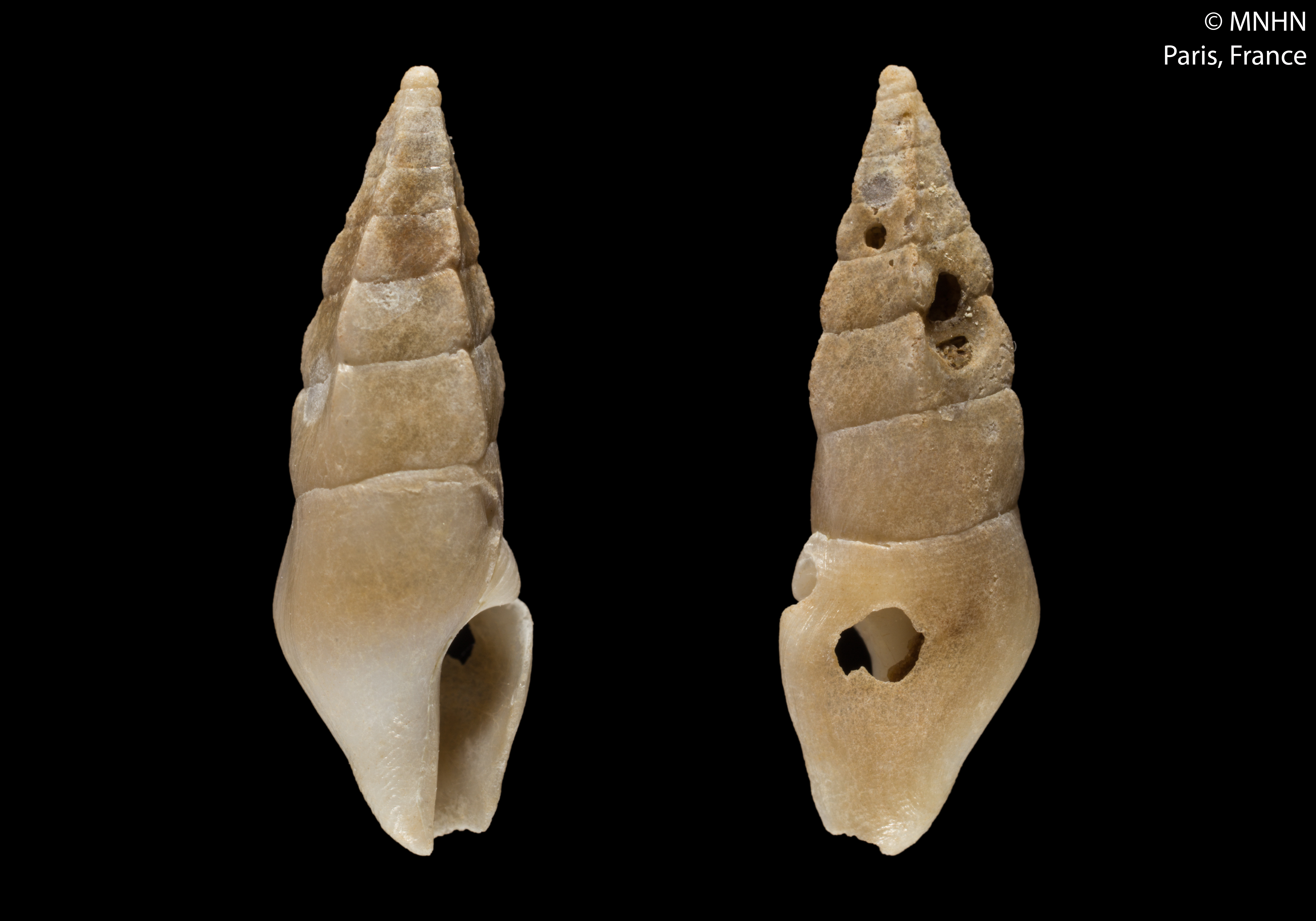
- Shell of Plagiostropha caledoniensis (holotype at MNHN, Paris)

Scientific classification
- Kingdom: Animalia
- Phylum: Mollusca
- Class: Gastropoda
- Subclass: Caenogastropoda
- Order: Neogastropoda
- Superfamily: Conoidea
- Family: Drilliidae
- Genus: Plagiostropha
- Species: P. caledoniensis

Binomial name
- Plagiostropha caledoniensis (Wells, 1995)

Synonyms
- Plagiostopha caledoniensis Wells, 1995

= Plagiostropha caledoniensis =

Species of gastropod

Plagiostropha caledoniensis is a species of sea snail, a marine gastropod mollusk in the family Drilliidae.

== Distribution ==
This marine species occurs in the demersal zone off New Caledonia at depths between 200 m and 350 m.
