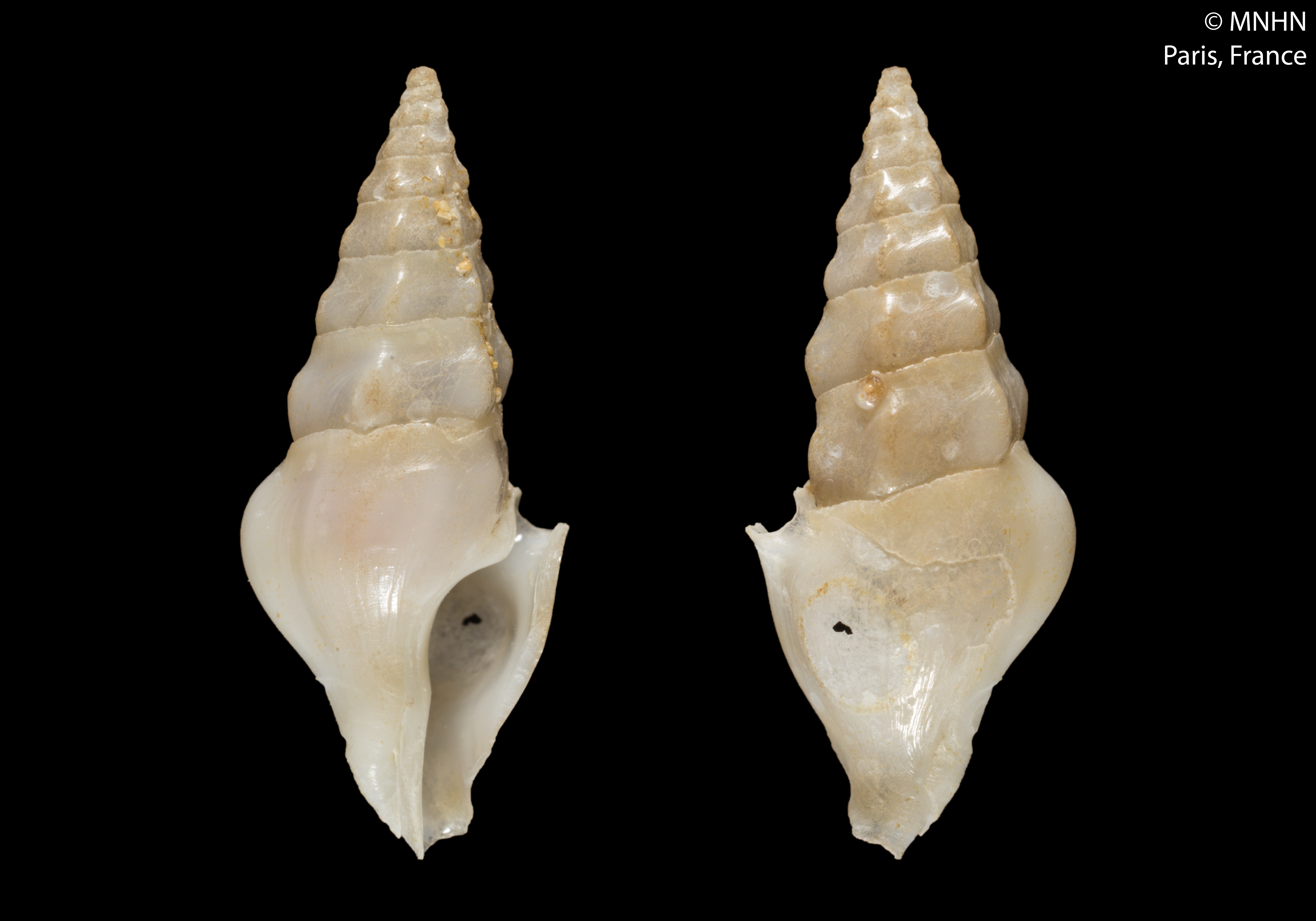
- Shell of Plagiostropha hexagona (holotype at MNHN, Paris)

Scientific classification
- Kingdom: Animalia
- Phylum: Mollusca
- Class: Gastropoda
- Subclass: Caenogastropoda
- Order: Neogastropoda
- Superfamily: Conoidea
- Family: Drilliidae
- Genus: Plagiostropha
- Species: P. hexagona

Binomial name
- Plagiostropha hexagona (Wells, 1995)

= Plagiostropha hexagona =

Species of gastropod

Plagiostropha hexagona is a species of sea snail, a marine gastropod mollusk in the family Drilliidae.

== Description ==
The length of the shell attains 16.7 mm.

== Distribution ==
This marine species occurs in the demersal zone off New Caledonia at depths of 410 m to 420 m.
