= Frank Turk (biologist) =

Entomologist

Frank Archibald Sinclair Turk
- Born: 15 January 1911; Wimbledon, London, England
- Died: 14 February 1996 (aged 85); Cornwall, England
- Education: London University
- Spouse: Stella Turk
- Scientific career
- Fields: Zoology
- Workplaces: University of Exeter

Frank Archibald Sinclair Turk (15 January 1911 – 14 February 1996) was a noted entomologist and adult educationalist.

In addition to his published work on insects, Frank worked as an adult educationalist and ran a programme through the University of Exeter's Department of Extra-Mural Studies. He had a close relationship with several artists including, the artist Peter Lanyon's son Andrew Lanyon, Peter Liddle and Sven Berlin.

Frank's wife Stella Turk, MBE, was also a published zoologist and worked with Frank in the field of adult education. Together they were instrumental in founding the Cornish Biological Record Unit at the University of Exeter's Institute of Cornish Studies which was later incorporated into the Cornwall Wildlife Trust. Frank was elected to be the Trust's first president in 1962.

== Publications ==
Turk's publications include:

- Turk, F.A. (1945a) New opilionids (Laniatores) from Indian Caves. Annals and Magazine of Natural History, (series 11) 12 (87), 202–207, 10 figs.
- Turk, F.A. (1945b) A correction and additional data to two former papers on opilionids and Diplopods from Indian Caves. Annals and Magazine of Natural History, (series 11) 12 (39), 420.
- Turk, F.A. (1948) Records and descriptions of new and little-known opiliones, mostly cavernicolous. Annals and Magazine of Natural History, (series 12) 1 (4), 254–262. [Issued Oct 1948].
- Turk, F.A. (1964) Obituary Notice. Prof. Dr. C. F. Roewer. Annals and Magazine of Natural History, (series 13) 6 [“1963”], 315–316. [Issued “May 1963”?].
- Turk, F.A. (1967) The non-aranean arachnid orders and the myriapods of British caves and mines. Transactions of the Cave Research Group of Great Britain, 9 (3), 142–161.

== See also ==
- Stella Turk, his wife and collaborator on conservation issues
