= Plagiostropha costata =

Scientific classification
- Kingdom: Animalia
- Phylum: Mollusca
- Class: Gastropoda
- Subclass: Caenogastropoda
- Order: Neogastropoda
- Superfamily: Conoidea
- Family: Drilliidae
- Genus: Plagiostropha
- Species: P. costata

Binomial name
- Plagiostropha costata (Wells, 1995)

Species of gastropod

Plagiostropha costata is a species of sea snail, a marine gastropod mollusk in the family Drilliidae.

== Distribution ==
This species occurs in the demersal zone of the Indian Ocean off La Réunion at depths between 170 m and 225 m.
