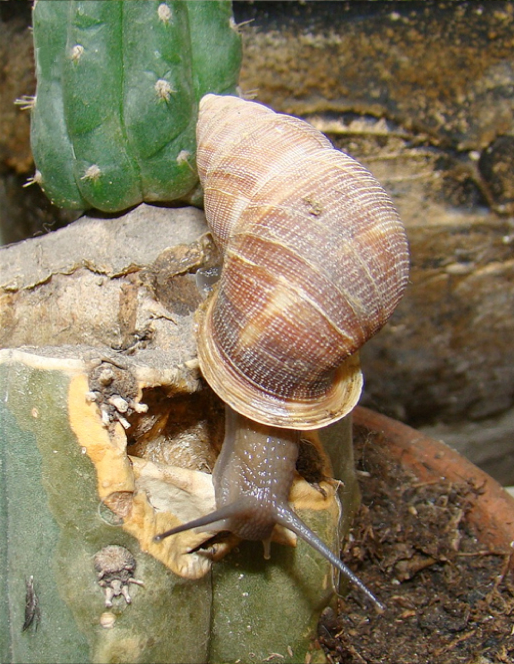
- A live individual of Scutalus mariopenai

Scientific classification
- Kingdom: Animalia
- Phylum: Mollusca
- Class: Gastropoda
- Order: Stylommatophora
- Suborder: Helicina
- Superfamily: Orthalicoidea
- Family: Bulimulidae
- Genus: Scutalus; Albers, 1850

Type species
- Bulinus proteus Broderip, 1832

Synonyms
- Buliminus (Scutalus) Albers, 1850· accepted, alternate representation; Bulimulus (Scutalus) Albers, 1850; Bulimus (Scutalus) Albers, 1850 (original rank); Scutalus (Scutalus) Albers, 1850· accepted, alternate representation; Spiroscutalus Pilsbry, 1932; Xenothauma Fulton, 1896

= Scutalus =

Genus of gastropods

Scutalus is a genus of air-breathing land snails, a terrestrial pulmonate gastropod mollusks in the family Bulimulidae.

Previously this genus was placed within the subfamily Bulimulinae.

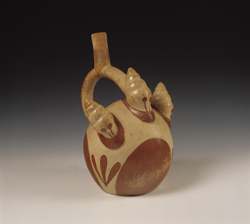
Shells of Scutalus sp. on a Moche pot, 200 AD. Larco Museum Collection, Lima, Peru.

== Species ==
Species in the genus Scutalus include:

- Scutalus baroni (Fulton, 1896)
- Scutalus broggii (Pilsbry & Olsson, 1949)
- Scutalus chango Araya & Breure, 2017
- Scutalus chiletensis Weyrauch, 1967
- Scutalus coraeformis (Pilsbry, 1897)
- Scutalus cousini (Jousseaume, 1887)
- Scutalus cretaceus (Pfeiffer, 1855) - images
- Scutalus grandiventris Weyrauch, 1960
- Scutalus latecolumellaris (Preston, 1909)
- Scutalus macedoi Weyrauch, 1967
- Scutalus mariopenai Breure & Mogollón Avilla, 2010
- Scutalus mutabilis (W.J. Broderip, 1832) (synonym: Bulinus mutabilis Broderip, 1832)
- Scutalus nivalis (d'Orbigny, 1835)
- Scutalus omissus Weyrauch, 1967
- Scutalus ortizpuentei Weyrauch, 1967
- Scutalus phaeocheilus (Haas, 1955)
- Scutalus pilosus Weyrauch, 1967
- Scutalus prometheus (J.C.H. Crosse, 1869) (synonym: Bulimus prometheus J.C.H. Crosse, 1869)
- Scutalus proteiformis (Dohrn, 1863)
- Scutalus proteus (W.J. Broderip, 1832) (synonym: Bulinus proteus Broderip, 1832)
- Scutalus quechuarum (Crawford, 1939)
- Scutalus sanborni (Haas, 1947)
- Scutalus sordidus (Deshayes, 1838)
- Scutalus steerei (Pilsbry, 1900)
- Scutalus versicolor (Broderip, 1832)

Species brought into synonymy

- Scutalus pluto (J.C.H. Crosse, 1869) (synonym: Bulimus pluto Crosse, 1869): synonym of Bocourtia pluto (Crosse, 1869)
- Scutalus revinctus (Hupé, 1857): synonym of Bulimus revinctus Hupé, 1857
- Scutalus tupacii (d'Orbigny, 1835): synonym of Bocourtia tupacii (d'Orbigny, 1835)
- Scutalus weddellii (Hupé, 1857) (synonym: Bulimus weddellii Hupé, 1857): synonym of Bocourtia weddellii (Hupé, 1857)
