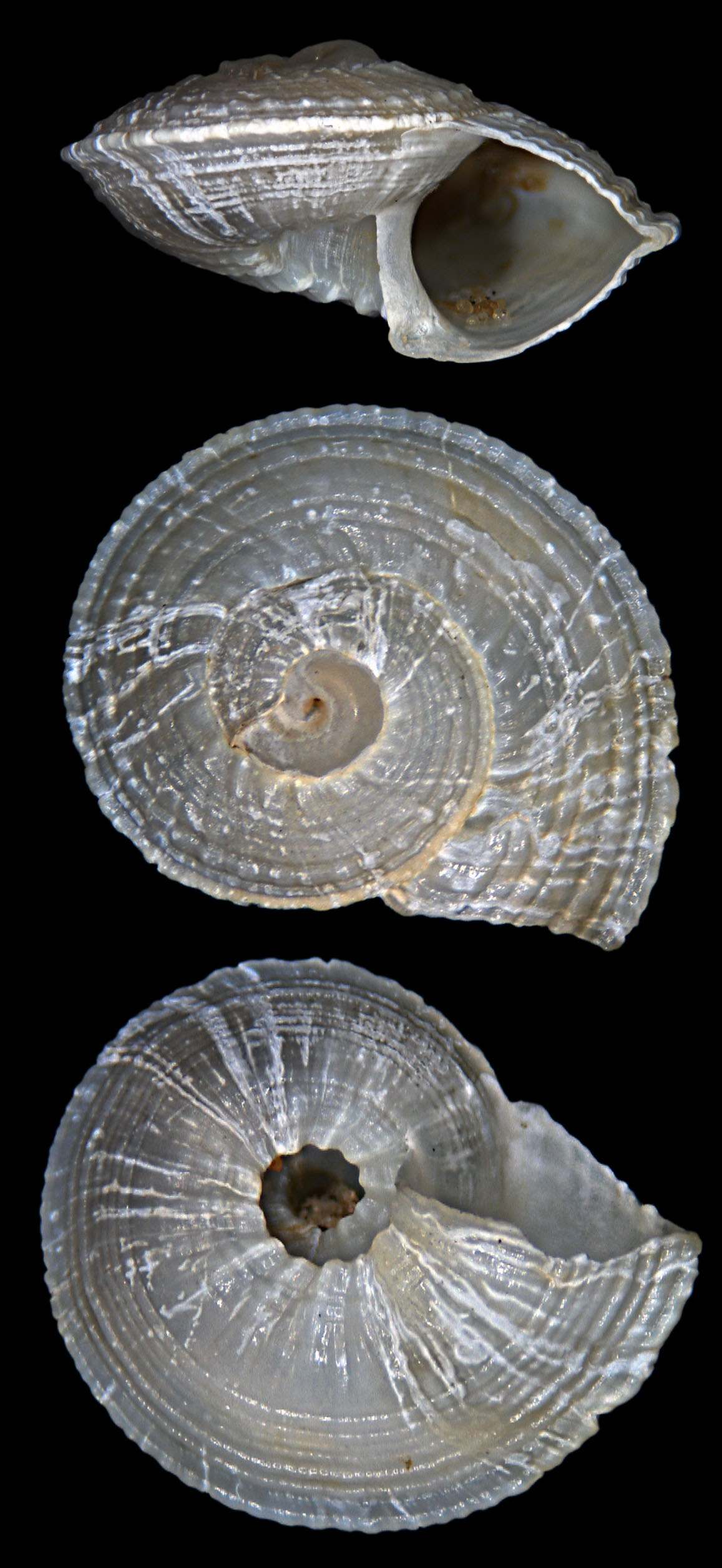
- Shell of Solatisonax rudigerbieleri (specimen at MNHN, Paris)

Scientific classification
- Kingdom: Animalia
- Phylum: Mollusca
- Class: Gastropoda
- Infraclass: "Lower Heterobranchia"
- Superfamily: Architectonicoidea
- Family: Architectonicidae
- Genus: Solatisonax; Iredale, 1931

Type species
- Solatisonax injussa Iredale, 1931

Synonyms
- Granoheliacus Melone & Taviani, 1985; Heliacus (Granoheliacus) Melone & Taviani, 1985; Redivivus Melone & Taviani, 1985

= Solatisonax =

Genus of gastropods

Solatisonax is a genus of sea snails, marine gastropod mollusks in the family Architectonicidae, the staircase shells or sundials.

== Species ==
According to the World Register of Marine Species, the following species are included in the genus Solatisonax:

- Solatisonax acutecarinata (Thiele, 1925)
- Solatisonax alleryi (Seguenza G., 1876)
- Solatisonax atkinsoni (E. A. Smith, 1891)
- Solatisonax balicasagensis Poppe & Tagaro, 2026
- Solatisonax borealis (Verrill & Smith in Verrill, 1880)
- Solatisonax cabrali Tenório, Barros, Francisco & Silva, 2011
- Solatisonax certesi (Dautzenberg & H. Fischer, 1896)
- Solatisonax contexta (G. Seguenza, 1876)
- Solatisonax dollfusi (Dautzenberg & H. Fischer, 1896)
- Solatisonax hemisphaerica (Seguenza, 1876)
- Solatisonax injussa Iredale, 1931
- Solatisonax kilburni Bieler, 1993
- Solatisonax orba Bieler, 1993
- Solatisonax propinqua Bieler, 1993
- Solatisonax radialis (Dall, 1908)
- Solatisonax rehderi Bieler, 1993
- Solatisonax rudigerbieleri Tenório, Barros, Francisco & Silva, 2011
- Solatisonax sigsbeei (Dall, 1889)
- Solatisonax supraradiata (Martens, 1904)

Species brought into synonymy include:

- Solatisonax bannocki (Melone & Taviani, 1980): synonym of Solatisonax hemisphaerica (Seguenza, 1876)
