= Journal of Molluscan Studies =

- Discipline: Malacology
- Language: English
- Edited by: Dinarzarde C. Raheem

Publication details
- Former name(s): Proceedings of the Malacological Society, Proceedings of the Malacological Society of London
- History: 1893–present
- Publisher: Oxford University Press on behalf of The Malacological Society of London (United Kingdom)
- Frequency: Quarterly
- Impact factor: 1.348 (2020)

Standard abbreviations
- ISO 4: J. Molluscan Stud.

Indexing
- ISSN: 0260-1230 (print); 1464-3766 (web)

Links
- Journal homepage; Online access; Online archive

The Journal of Molluscan Studies is the peer-reviewed scientific journal of the Malacological Society of London, covering research in malacology. The editor-in-chief is Dinarzarde C. Raheem.

Previous names of this journal include Proceedings of the Malacological Society, and Proceedings of the Malacological Society of London (abbreviated as Proc. Malacol. Soc. Lond.).

== Abstracting and indexing ==
The journal is abstracted and indexed by Aquatic Sciences and Fisheries Abstracts, Biological Abstracts, BIOSIS Previews, CAB Abstracts, Current Contents/Agriculture, Biology, and Environmental Sciences, BIOBASE, ProQuest, Science Citation Index Expanded, Scopus, and The Zoological Record.

According to the Journal Citation Reports, the journal has a 2020 impact factor was 1.348.

== See also ==
- Archiv für Molluskenkunde
- Basteria
- Journal of Conchology
- Malacologia
- The Nautilus
