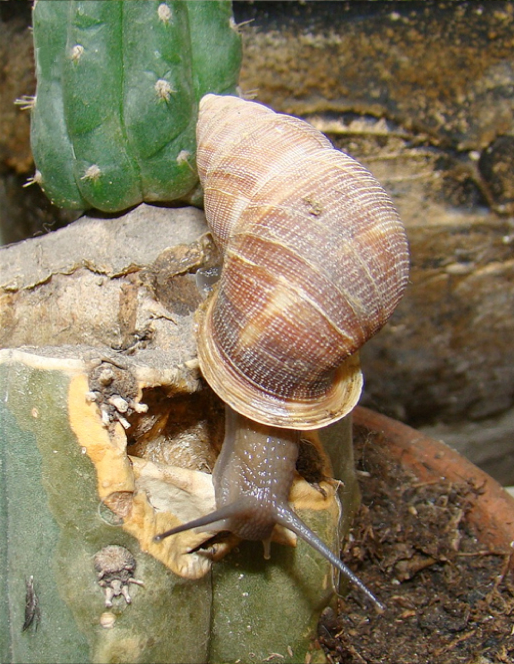
- A live individual of Scutalus mariopenai

Scientific classification
- Domain: Eukaryota
- Kingdom: Animalia
- Phylum: Mollusca
- Class: Gastropoda
- Order: Stylommatophora
- Family: Bulimulidae
- Genus: Scutalus
- Species: S. mariopenai

Binomial name
- Scutalus mariopenai Breure & Mogollón Avilla, 2010

= Scutalus mariopenai =

Species of gastropod

Scutalus mariopenai is a species of air-breathing land snail, a terrestrial pulmonate gastropod mollusk in the family Bulimulidae.

The specific name mariopenai honours Mario Peña González, a malacologist from Lima and tutor of the second author. The specific epithet is a noun in the genitive case.

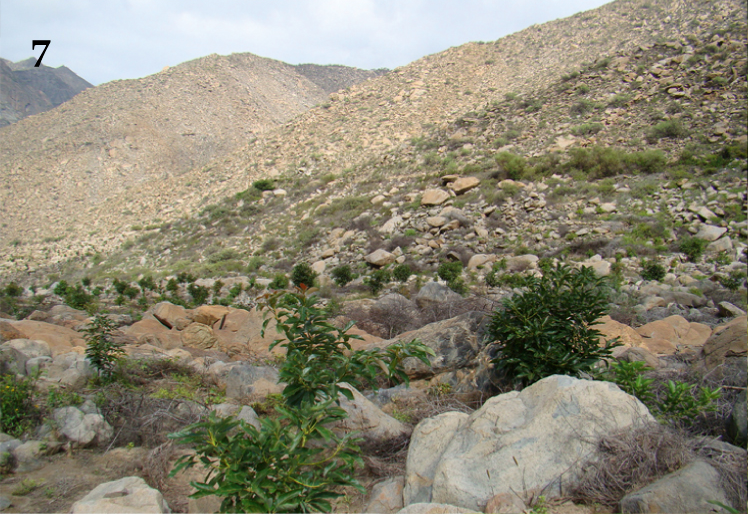
The type locality of Scutalus mariopenai

== Distribution ==
The distribution of Scutalus mariopenai includes Peru. The type locality is Catzcal (09°54’43’S 077°49’40’W), Ancash Region, Peru. Type specimens are stored in the Netherlands Centre for Biodiversity Naturalis, Leiden, the Netherlands, and in the private collection of V. Mogollón Avila, Lima, Peru.

== Description ==
Scutalus mariopenai is characterized by the broadly expanded and callous lip, the fine, punctuate granulation, and the whitish-corneous ground colour, with four brown spiral bands on the last whorl.

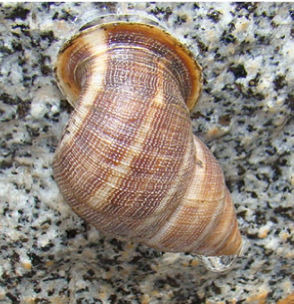
Specimen aestivating on rock shows its broadly expanded lip.

The shell height is up to 41.1 mm, 1.65 times as long as wide, umbilicate and deeply perforated, conical, with slightly convex sides and solid. Ground colour is uniformly whitish-corneous, the upper whorls are lighter, with four spiral light chestnut-brown bands, a small one below the white-lined suture, two broader ones above and below the periphery (which in some specimens are faintly subdivided into two equally broad bands) and a fourth band encircling the umbilicus. The surface is lustreless, with growth striae and spiral lines of fine, punctuate granulation, starting shallowly on the postnepionic whorl, but becoming rapidly more conspicuous on the following and fading away inside the umbilicus. The protoconch is pit-reticulate. The shell has 6.3 whorls that are somewhat convex. The last whorl is saccate. The suture is impressed, somewhat crenulate, at the aperture ascending in front. The aperture is large, ovate, glossy white inside with the pattern visible in banded specimens. Apertural margins are converging. The aperture is 1.30 times as long as wide, 0.70 times the total height. The peristome is broadly expanded and backwardly reflexed, glossy whitish. Columellar margin is straight, broadly expanded and merging into the rather thick parietal callus.

The height of the shell is 36.7–41.1 mm. The width of the shell is 21.9–36.2 mm. The shell has 6–6.5 mm.

Dimensions of the holotype are as follows: The height of the holotype is 41.1 mm. The width of the shell is 26.2 mm. The height of the aperture is 22.6 mm. The width of the aperture is 17.9 mm. The height of the last whorl is 29.6 mm. The shell has 6.3 whorls.

Type material: apertural and abapertural views of two shells of Scutalus mariopenai showing its color variability:

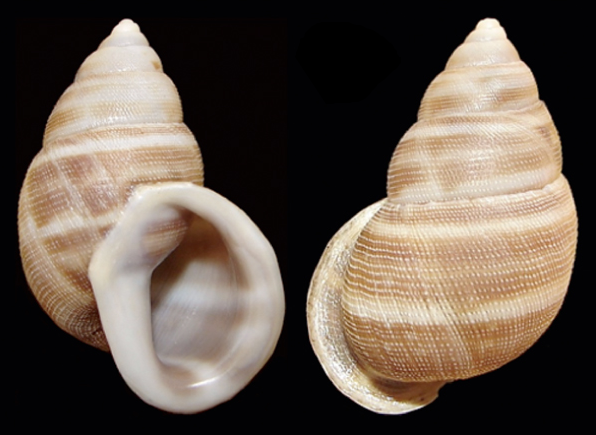
Holotype

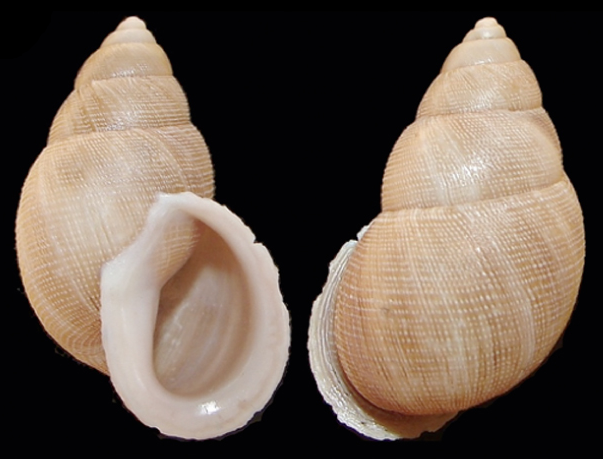
Paratype

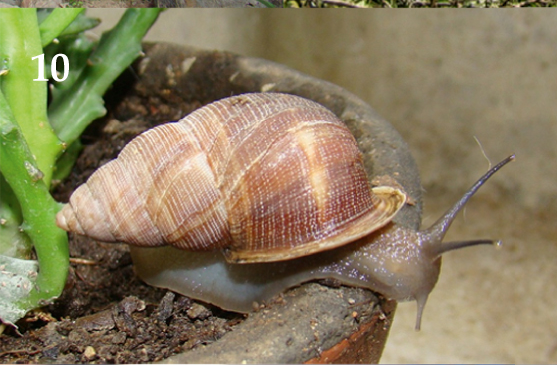
A pale-grey specimen with a dark-greyish band along the foot.

Living animal is whitish- to pale-grey, with a dark-greyish band along the foot. Tentacles are dark-grey near the eye-tips, lighter at the base.

This species is closely allied to Scutalus ortizpuentei Weyrauch, 1967 which was described from Dept. Cajamarca, Río Chancay valley, between Chiclayo and Chota, 80 km north of Quinden (ca. 06°38’S 079°05’W) in Peru. It differs from this species by being smaller (41 vs. 48 mm shell height), having a smaller aperture, and the lip more broadly expanded. The faintly visible subdivision of the spiral bands around the periphery, visible in some specimens of Scutalus mariopenai, resembles the more pronounced colour pattern in Scutalus ortizpuentei. It may also be compared to Scutalus cretaceus (Pfeiffer, 1855) from which it differs by being less elongate, having a stronger sculpture on the last whorl, having the inside of the aperture whitish coloured; having the lip more broadly expanded.
