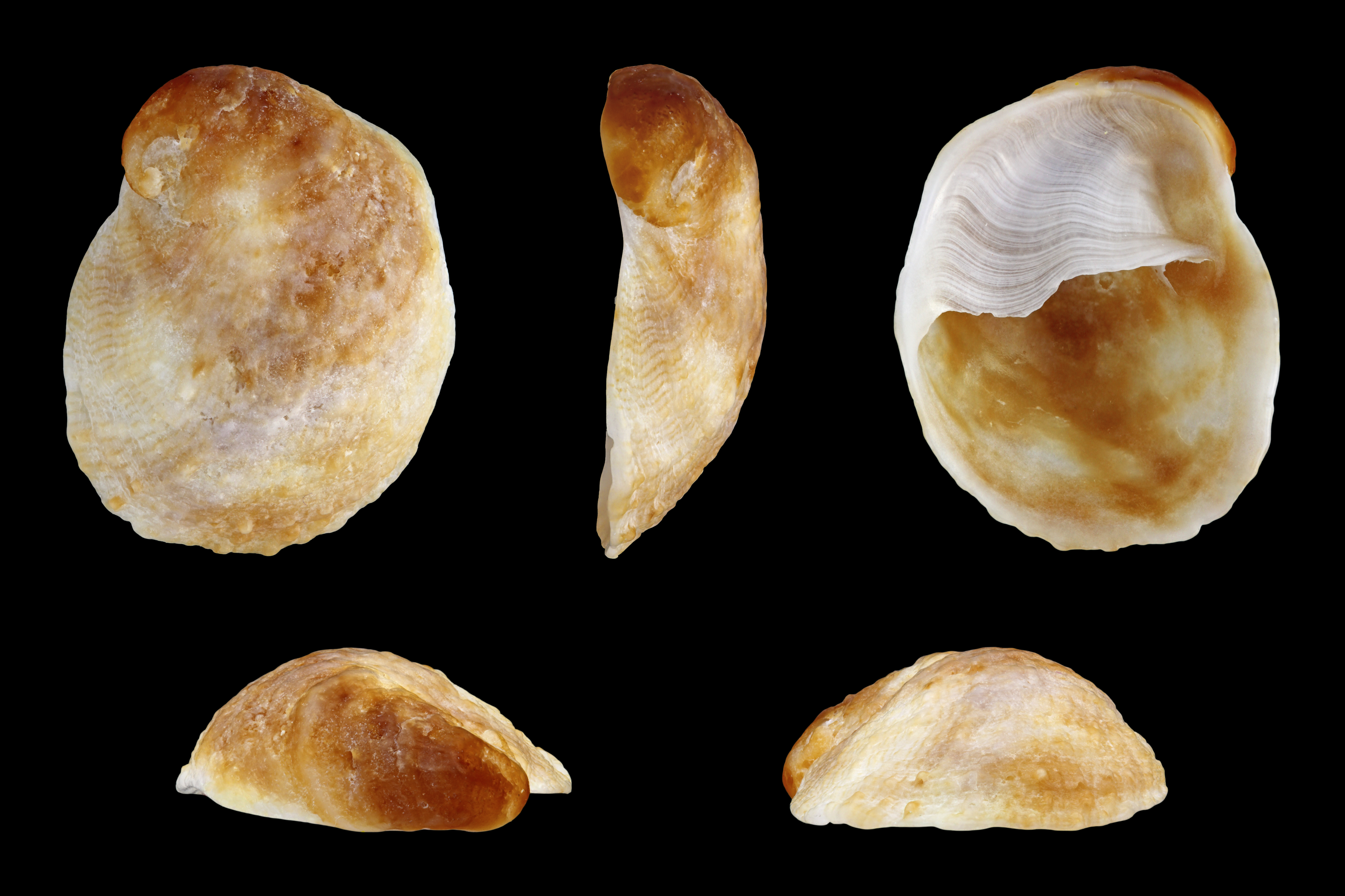
- Bostrycapulus aculeatus

Scientific classification
- Kingdom: Animalia
- Phylum: Mollusca
- Class: Gastropoda
- Subclass: Caenogastropoda
- Order: Littorinimorpha
- Family: Calyptraeidae
- Genus: Bostrycapulus; Olsson & Harbison, 1953

Species
- See text

= Bostrycapulus =

Bostrycapulus Temporal range: Miocene–Recent

Genus of gastropods

Bostrycapulus, commonly known as the spiny slipper snails, is a genus of sea snails in the family Calyptraeidae.

Before 2005, the snails in this genus were all thought to belong to one species, which was known as Crepidula aculeata, the spiny slipper snail. However, morphological and DNA sequence data show that the spiny slipper snails are a monophyletic group that is more closely related to Crepipatella than it is to Crepidula.

== Taxonomy ==
=== Taxonomic history ===
All of the species within the genus Bostrycapulus were previously assigned to a single species, Crepidula aculeata. However, molecular phylogenetic and anatomical work have shown them to be a separate monophyletic grouping or clade, which has elevated them to the genus status. DNA sequence data has also been used in combination with embryological observations to distinguish 8 species.

=== Species ===
Species within the genus Bostrycapulus include:

- Bostrycapulus aculeatus (Gmelin, 1791) - type species
- Bostrycapulus calyptraeformis (Deshayes, 1830)
- Bostrycapulus gravispinosus (Kuroda and Habe, 1950)
- Bostrycapulus heteropoma Collin & Rolán, 2010
- Bostrycapulus latebrus Collin, 2005
- Bostrycapulus odites Collin, 2005
- Bostrycapulus pritzkeri Collin, 2005
- Bostrycapulus tegulicius (Rochebrune, 1883)
- Bostrycapulus urraca Collin, 2005
