= Scutalus macedoi =

Scientific classification
- Domain: Eukaryota
- Kingdom: Animalia
- Phylum: Mollusca
- Class: Gastropoda
- Order: Stylommatophora
- Family: Bulimulidae
- Genus: Scutalus
- Species: S. macedoi

Binomial name
- Scutalus macedoi Weyrauch, 1967

Species of gastropod

Scutalus macedoi is a species of tropical air-breathing land snail, a pulmonate gastropod mollusk in the family Bulimulidae.

== Distribution ==
- Peru

This species was described from Capillacocha, 11°10’09’S 076°02’25’W, 4150 m, Junín Region, Peru.

Breure (2010) recorded it for the first time from the western slopes of the Cordillera Occidental near Laguna El Viuda, 11°21’45’S 076°38’23’W, 4450 m, Canta Province, Lima Region, Peru.

The material from Canta province has the upper whorls reddish-blue and the specimens are more slender than those shown in the original figure of Weyrauch. However, compared to paratypes (RMNH 55449/5), the shell shape is similar.
