= Bostrycapulus latebrus =

Scientific classification
- Kingdom: Animalia
- Phylum: Mollusca
- Class: Gastropoda
- Subclass: Caenogastropoda
- Order: Littorinimorpha
- Family: Calyptraeidae
- Genus: Bostrycapulus
- Species: B. latebrus

Binomial name
- Bostrycapulus latebrus Collin, 2005

Species of gastropod

Bostrycapulus latebrus is a species of sea snail, a marine gastropod mollusk in the family Calyptraeidae, the slipper snails or slipper limpets, cup-and-saucer snails, and Chinese hat snails.
