= Folia Malacologica =

- Discipline: Malacology
- Language: English
- Edited by: Andrzej Lesicki

Publication details
- History: 1995–present
- Publisher: The Association of Polish Malacologists (Poland)
- Frequency: Quarterly
- Open access: Yes
- Impact factor: 0.4 (2021)

Standard abbreviations
- ISO 4: Folia Malacol.

Indexing
- ISSN: 1506-7629 (print); 2300-7125 (web)
- JSTOR: 15067629

Links
- Journal homepage

Folia Malacologica is a peer-reviewed scientific journal publishing in the field of malacology (study of mollusks), it is published quarterly and covers all aspects of malacology (including systematics, phylogeny, ecology, developmental and behavioral biology etc.).

Folia Malacologica was founded by the AGH University of Science and Technology in Cracow as a scientific bulletin in 1987. The change of this bulletin to a scientific journal occurred in 1995, with the Association of Polish Malacologists taking over the ownership of the journal.

The current impact factor of the Folia Malacologica is 0.4 (as of 2021).
