= Conchological Society of Great Britain & Ireland =

UK-based scientific society

The Conchological Society of Great Britain and Ireland is a British-based learned society concerned with the study of molluscs and their shells. Founded in 1876, it is one of the oldest such societies in the world. It is a registered UK charity (no. 208205) that anyone can join. It promotes the study of molluscs and their conservation, through meetings, publications, workshops, field meetings, and distribution recording schemes.

== Journals ==
Two periodicals are published by the society:

- Journal of Conchology – a scientific publication issued twice a year
- Mollusc World – the magazine of the Society, previously known as The Conchologists' Newsletter, and issued three times a year

== See also ==
- Netherlands Malacological Society
- Malacological Society of London
- Stella Turk
- Arthur Erskine Ellis
