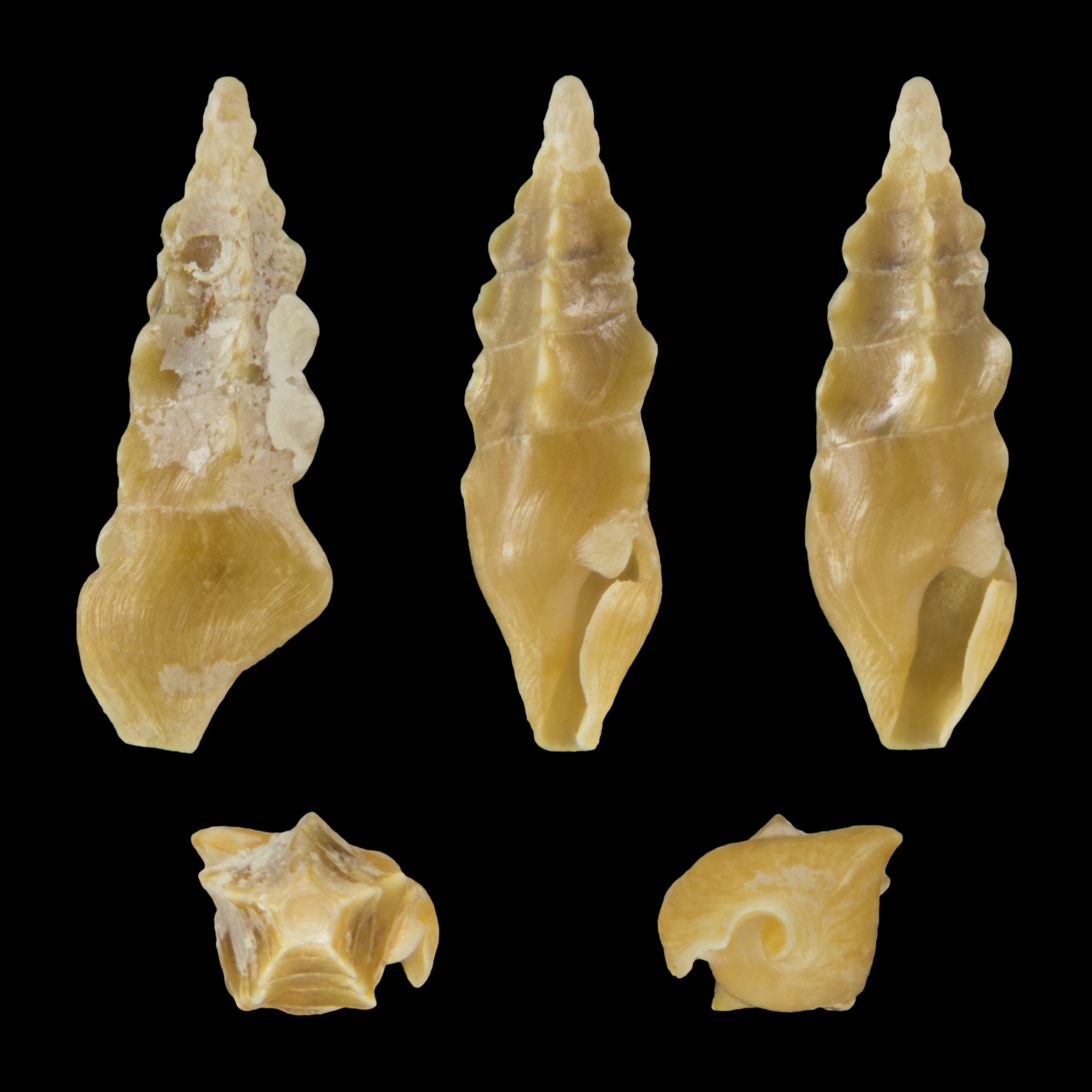
- Five views of a shell of Plagiostropha quintuplex

Scientific classification
- Kingdom: Animalia
- Phylum: Mollusca
- Class: Gastropoda
- Subclass: Caenogastropoda
- Order: Neogastropoda
- Superfamily: Conoidea
- Family: Drilliidae
- Genus: Plagiostropha
- Species: P. quintuplex

Binomial name
- Plagiostropha quintuplex Melvill, 1927

Synonyms
- Clavus (Plagiostropha) quintuplex Melvill, 1927; Clavus quintuplex (Melvill, 1927)

= Plagiostropha quintuplex =

Species of gastropod

Plagiostropha quintuplex is a species of sea snail, a marine gastropod mollusk in the family Drilliidae.

== Description ==
The shell grows to a length of 8 mm.

== Distribution ==
This species occurs in the demersal zone of the tropical Indo-Pacific off the Philippines and Taiwan.
