= Miscellanea Malacologica =

- Discipline: Malacology
- Language: English
- Edited by: M. J. Faber, R. G. Moolenbeek, A. N. Van Der Bijl

Publication details
- History: 2004–present
- Publisher: Marien Faber (Netherlands)

Standard abbreviations
- ISO 4: Misc. Malacol.

Indexing
- ISSN: 1573-9953
- OCLC no.: 86123684

Links
- Journal homepage; List of volumes, issues, and papers

Miscellanea Malacologica is a peer-reviewed scientific journal covering malacology, specifically papers on the taxonomy, nomenclature, and zoogeography of mollusks. The journal is published by Marien Faber (Duivendrecht, the Netherlands) and was established in 2004.

The name of the journal is Latin for "malacological miscellany". The journal is a large format publication with color illustrations. It is published on an irregular basis: from 2004 to 2012 it had from two to five issues per year. The journal is abstracted and indexed in The Zoological Record.
