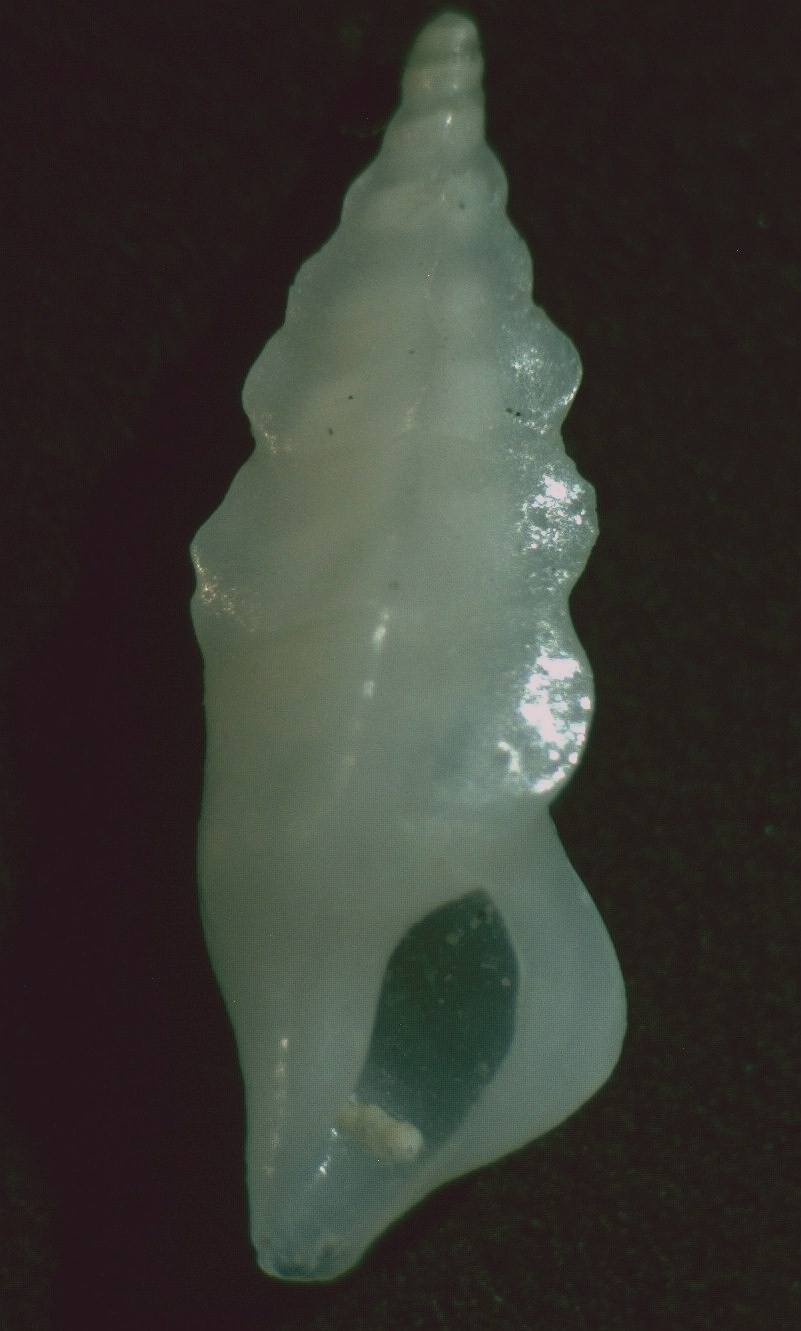
- Apertural view of a shell of Plagiostropha opalus

Scientific classification
- Kingdom: Animalia
- Phylum: Mollusca
- Class: Gastropoda
- Subclass: Caenogastropoda
- Order: Neogastropoda
- Superfamily: Conoidea
- Family: Drilliidae
- Genus: Plagiostropha
- Species: P. opalus

Binomial name
- Plagiostropha opalus (Reeve, 1845)

Synonyms
- Mangilia opalus Reeve, 1845; Clavus opalus (Reeve, 1845); Drillia opalus (Reeve, 1845); Pleurotoma opalus Reeve, 1845

= Plagiostropha opalus =

Species of gastropod

Plagiostropha opalus is a species of sea snail, a marine gastropod mollusk in the family Drilliidae.

== Description ==
The size of an adult shell varies between 9 mm and 20 mm. The shell has continuous longitudinal distant ribs. The wide interstices are smooth or with revolving striae. The whorls are obtusely angulated in the middle. The shell is white with the interstices of the ribs sometimes more or less stained with brown.

== Distribution ==
This species occurs in the demersal zone of the tropical Indo-Pacific off Fiji, New Caledonia and the Philippines.
