= Bostrycapulus odites =

Scientific classification
- Kingdom: Animalia
- Phylum: Mollusca
- Class: Gastropoda
- Subclass: Caenogastropoda
- Order: Littorinimorpha
- Family: Calyptraeidae
- Genus: Bostrycapulus
- Species: B. odites

Binomial name
- Bostrycapulus odites Collin, 2005

Species of gastropod

Bostrycapulus odites is a species of sea snail, a marine gastropod mollusk in the family Calyptraeidae, the slipper snails or slipper limpets, cup-and-saucer snails, and Chinese hat snails.

== Description ==
The maximum recorded shell length is 30 mm.

== Habitat ==
Minimum recorded depth is 0 m. Maximum recorded depth is 46 m.
