= Malacologica Bohemoslovaca =

- Discipline: Malacology
- Language: Czech, Slovak, English
- Edited by: Lucie Juřičková

Publication details
- History: 2002-present
- Publisher: Masaryk University (Czech Republic)
- Frequency: Upon acceptance
- Open access: Yes
- License: Creative Commons Attribution 4.0

Standard abbreviations
- ISO 4: Malacol. Bohemoslov.

Indexing
- ISSN: 1336-6939
- OCLC no.: 325000580

Links
- Journal homepage

Malacologica Bohemoslovaca is a peer-reviewed open access scientific journal covering all aspects of malacology. It was published by the Slovak Academy of Sciences since 2005. It is published by the Department of Botany and Zoology, Faculty of Science, Masaryk University since 2021. The editor-in-chief is Lucie Juřičková (Charles University in Prague). Articles are published in Czech, Slovak or English, with an abstract in English. The journal is abstracted and indexed in The Zoological Record.
