= Plagiostropha flexus =

Scientific classification
- Kingdom: Animalia
- Phylum: Mollusca
- Class: Gastropoda
- Subclass: Caenogastropoda
- Order: Neogastropoda
- Superfamily: Conoidea
- Family: Drilliidae
- Genus: Plagiostropha
- Species: P. flexus

Binomial name
- Plagiostropha flexus (Shuto, 1983)

Synonyms
- Clavus (Plagiostropha) flexus Shuto, 1983 (basionym)

Species of gastropod

Plagiostropha flexus is a species of sea snail, a marine gastropod mollusk in the family Drilliidae.

== Distribution ==
This marine species is endemic to Australia and occurs in the demersal zone off Croker Island, Gulf of Carpentaria, Northern Territory, Australia at a depth of 125 m (410 ft).
