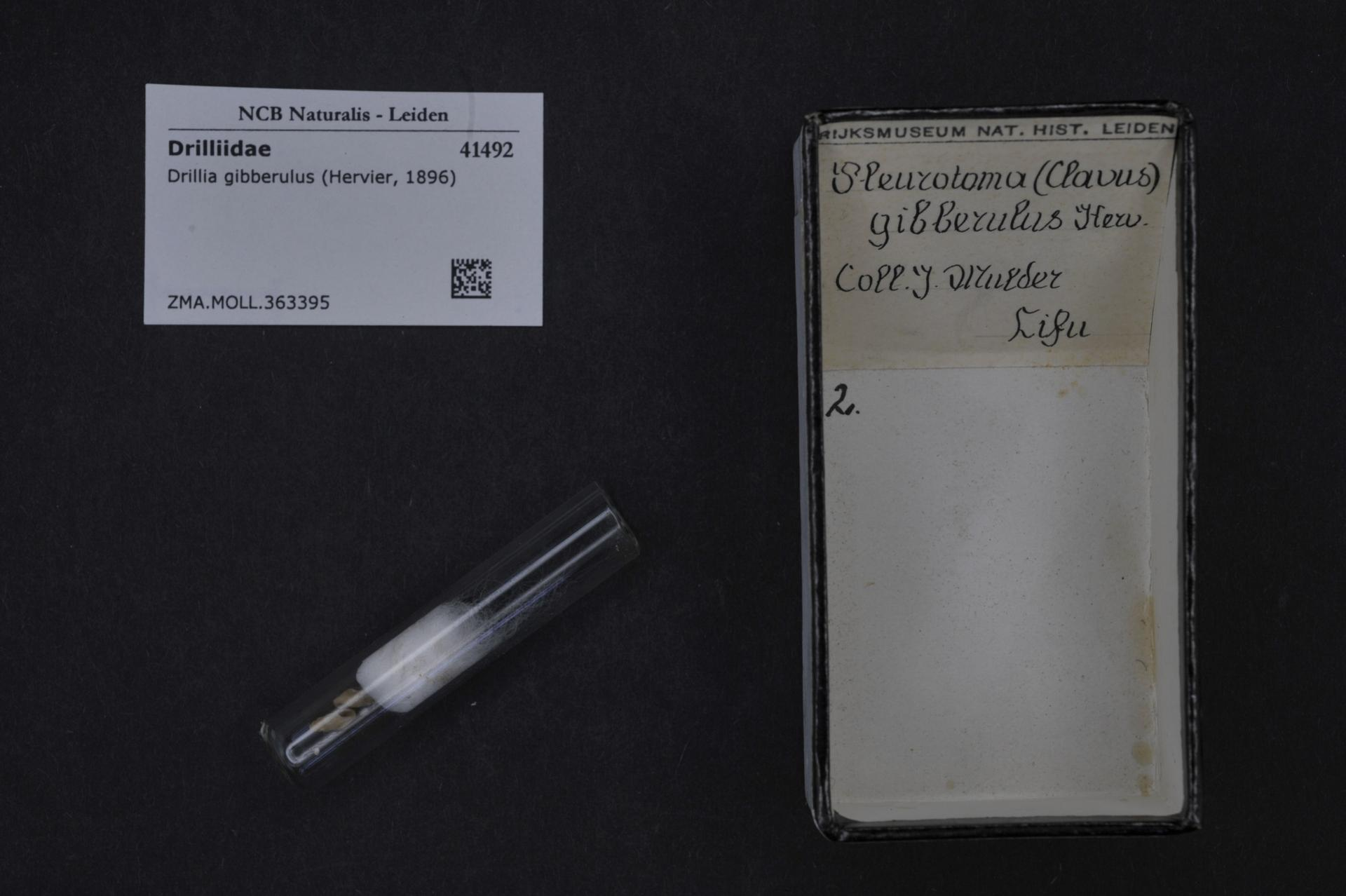
- Drillia gibberulus shell

Scientific classification
- Kingdom: Animalia
- Phylum: Mollusca
- Class: Gastropoda
- Subclass: Caenogastropoda
- Order: Neogastropoda
- Superfamily: Conoidea
- Family: Drilliidae
- Genus: Drillia
- Species: D. gibberulus

Binomial name
- Drillia gibberulus (Hervier, 1896)

Synonyms
- Clavus gibberulus Hervier, 1896; Plagiostropha gibberula (Hervier, 1896)

= Drillia gibberulus =

Species of mollusk

Drillia gibberulus is a species of sea snail, a marine gastropod mollusk in the family Drilliidae.

== Description ==
The length of the shell attains 6 mm, its diameter 2 mm.

The small shell has an ovate-fusiform shape. It contains 6-7 subconvex whorls crossed by oblique, obtuse longitudinal plicae (5-7 in penultimate whorl and fewer in the body whorl). The small aperture is ovate. The simple columella is slightly angled. The outer lip is sharp-edged. The oblique anal sulcus is deep, narrow and slightly spherical in shape.

== Distribution ==
This marine species occurs in the demersal zone off New Caledonia.
