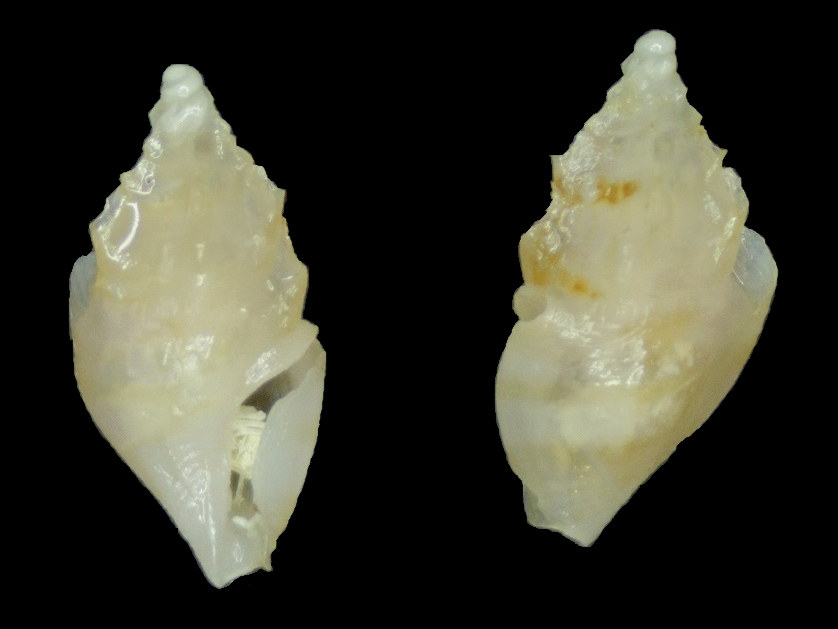
- Shell of Plagiostropha vertigomaeniana

Scientific classification
- Kingdom: Animalia
- Phylum: Mollusca
- Class: Gastropoda
- Subclass: Caenogastropoda
- Order: Neogastropoda
- Superfamily: Conoidea
- Family: Drilliidae
- Genus: Plagiostropha
- Species: P. vertigomaeniana

Binomial name
- Plagiostropha vertigomaeniana Chino & Stahlschmidt, 2010

= Plagiostropha vertigomaeniana =

Species of gastropod

Plagiostropha vertigomaeniana is a species of sea snail, a marine gastropod mollusk in the family Drilliidae.

== Description ==
The length of the shell varies between 6 mm and 11 mm.

== Distribution ==
This marine species occurs off Balicasag Island, Panglao, Bohol, the Philippines.
