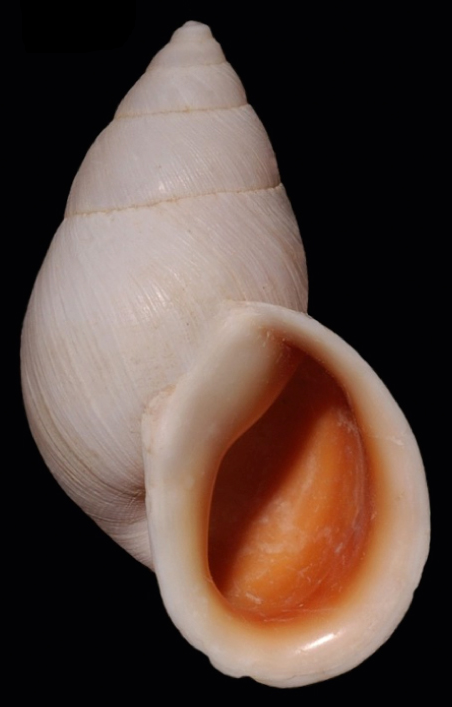
- Holotype of the shell of Scutalus phaeocheilus altoensis. Shell height 37.2 mm.

Scientific classification
- Kingdom: Animalia
- Phylum: Mollusca
- Class: Gastropoda
- Order: Stylommatophora
- Family: Bulimulidae
- Genus: Scutalus
- Species: S. phaeocheilus

Binomial name
- Scutalus phaeocheilus (Haas, 1955)

= Scutalus phaeocheilus =

Species of gastropod

Scutalus phaeocheilus is a species of tropical air-breathing land snail, a pulmonate gastropod mollusk in the family Bulimulidae found in northern Peru.

== Subspecies ==
- Scutalus phaeocheilus altoensis Breure & Mogollón Avila, 2010

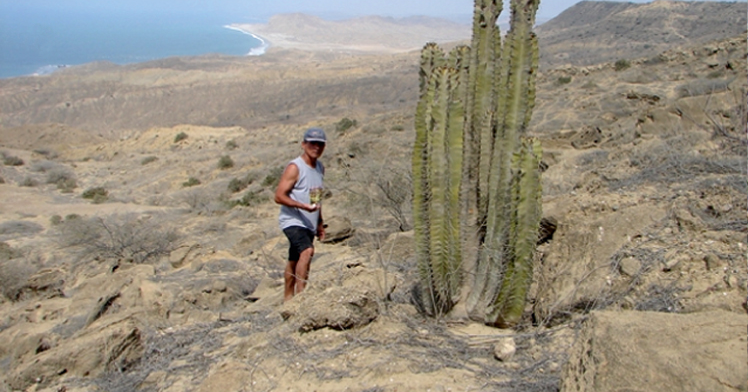
Type locality of Scutalus phaeocheilus altoensis Piura Region, El Alto District.

== Distribution ==
- Peru

Scutalus phaeocheilus phaeocheilus occurs in south of the Lambayeque Region.

== Description ==
When describing the nominate taxon, Haas already noted the relationship with Scutalus proteiformis. He stated that this species ‘seems to lack the granules entirely’. According to Pilsbry (1897), who copied the original description, the ‘granulation [is] confined to the last whorl’. However, Scutalus phaeocheilus altoensis is smaller and slightly stouter than Scutalus proteiformis and is also slightly more granulose than this species, especially visible in fresh specimens. Moreover, Scutalus proteiformis is said to have the aperture dark brown coloured. Scutalus proteiformis species, which has not been figured, was mentioned by Weyrauch (1967) from northern Peru without further information.

== Scutalus phaeocheilus altoensis ==
The subspecific name altoensis refers to El Alto, the type locality.

Scutalus phaeocheilus altoensis is characterized by the whitish colour, the sculpture of growth striae and inconspicuous granules on the last whorl, the broadly expanded lip and the orange colour of the aperture inside.

The height of the shell is up to 38.1 mm, 1.71 times as long as wide, deeply perforated, conical, with slightly convex sides and solid. Colour is uniformly (greyish-)whitish, the upper whorls somewhat lighter in greyish-white specimens. The surface is lustreless, with incrassate growth striae and inconspicuous granulation, under a strong lens visible as spiral rows of shallowly raised, short oblong granules; only in fresh specimens this granulation may be observed on the third and following whorls. Protoconch is pit-reticulate. The shell has 5.7-6 whorls, that are somewhat convex. Suture is impressed, crenulated, at the aperture ascending in front. Aperture is large, ovate, in fresh shells orange inside; margins converging; 1.33 times as long as wide, 0.73 times the total height. Peristome broadly expanded and reflexed, whitish. Columellar margin straight, broadly expanded and merging into the parietal callus, which is whitish and thickened in some specimens.

The width of the shell is 19.9 - 22.7 mm. The height of the shell is 34.3 - 38.1 mm. The width of the aperture is 14.2 – 17 mm. The height of the aperture is 19.3 - 22.8 mm. The height of the last whorl is 25.1 – 28 mm.

The holotype of Scutalus phaeocheilus altoensis has 5.8 whorls and dimension of holotype are as follows: The width of the shell is 21.4 mm. The height of the shell is 37.2 mm. The width of the aperture is 14.6 mm. The height of the aperture is 19.5 mm. The height of the last whorl is 25.9 mm.

Scutalus phaeocheilus altoensis differs from Scutalus phaeocheilus phaeocheilus by (1) being slightly smaller, (2) having the lip more broadly expanded and (3) having the aperture differently coloured (the nominate taxon has the aperture liver-coloured).
