= Plagiostropha rubrifaba =

Scientific classification
- Kingdom: Animalia
- Phylum: Mollusca
- Class: Gastropoda
- Subclass: Caenogastropoda
- Order: Neogastropoda
- Superfamily: Conoidea
- Family: Drilliidae
- Genus: Plagiostropha
- Species: P. rubrifaba

Binomial name
- Plagiostropha rubrifaba Chino & Stahlschmidt, 2010

Species of gastropod

Plagiostropha rubrifaba is a species of sea snail, a marine gastropod mollusk in the family Drilliidae.

== Description ==
The length of the shell attains 6 mm.

== Distribution ==
This marine species occurs off Mactan Island, Cebu, the Philippines.
