= Periaulax =

Scientific classification
- Kingdom: Animalia
- Phylum: Mollusca
- Class: Gastropoda
- Subclass: Vetigastropoda
- Order: Trochida
- Family: Trochidae
- Genus: †Periaulax; Cossmann, 1888

Extinct genus of gastropods

Periaulax is an extinct genus of gastropods in the family Trochidae.

== Species ==
Species in the genus Periaulax include:

- Periaulax rimosus
- Periaulax tsheganica Amitrov, 2010 - It existed in what is now Kazakhstan during the Eocene period.

It formerly contained the species Periaulax spiratus, which is currently recognized as Margarites spiratus.
