= Staala =

Conservation status
- Imperiled (NatureServe)

- Special Concern (COSEWIC)

Scientific classification
- Kingdom: Animalia
- Phylum: Mollusca
- Class: Gastropoda
- Order: Stylommatophora
- Family: Arionidae
- Genus: Staala; Ovaska, Chichester and Sopuck, 2010
- Species: S. gwaii

Binomial name
- Staala gwaii Ovaska, Chichester and Sopuck, 2010

Genus of molluscs

Staala gwaii, the Haida Gwaii slug, is a species of slug in the family Arionidae. It is the only species in the genus Staala.

== Distribution ==
Scientists catalogued the Haida Gwaii slug in 2003 in Haida Gwaii. It was thereafter noted on Brooks Peninsula on Vancouver Island, British Columbia. These areas were both refugia or nearby refugia during the Late Glacial Maximum. Therefore they harbour several Ice Age relicts, of which Staala gwaii is just one. This camelback slug is a poor disperser, and has not expanded beyond its range.

== Description ==
The slug grows to 1-2 cm long. Its distinctive mantle features a pronounced hump, and small, black-tipped projections or papillae cover its entire body. It is jet black to grey or tan in colour.
