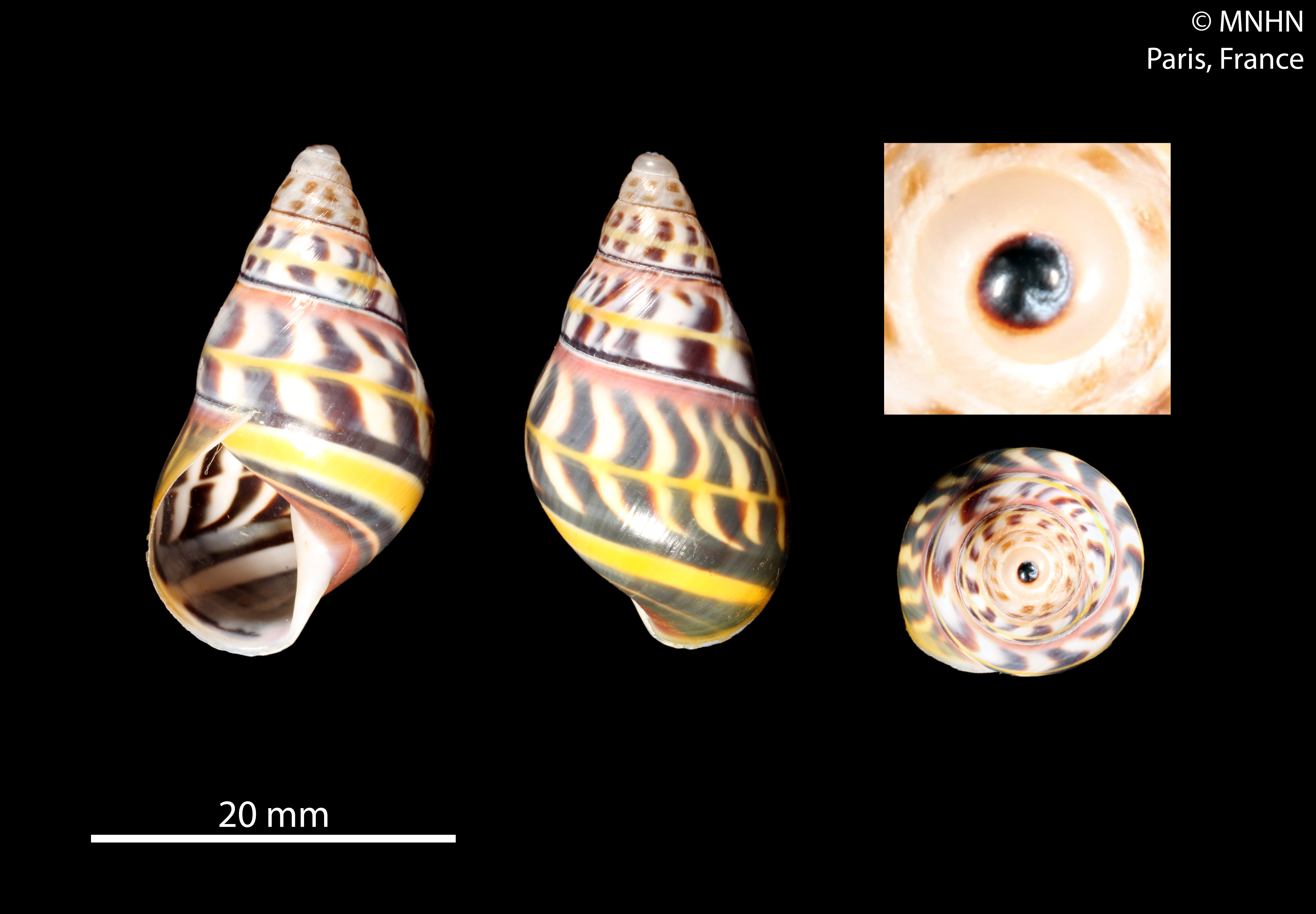
- Shell of Amphidromus rottiensis (paratype at MNHN, Paris)

Scientific classification
- Kingdom: Animalia
- Phylum: Mollusca
- Class: Gastropoda
- Order: Stylommatophora
- Family: Camaenidae
- Genus: Amphidromus
- Species: A. rottiensis

Binomial name
- Amphidromus rottiensis Chan & Tan, 2010

Synonyms
- Amphidromus (Syndromus) rottiensis Chan & Tan, 2010· accepted, alternate representation

= Amphidromus rottiensis =

Species of gastropod

Amphidromus rottiensis is a species of air-breathing land snail, a terrestrial pulmonate gastropod mollusc in the family Camaenidae. Information about it was published in 2008, and its nomen nudum validated in 2010.

== Distribution ==
It was first identified near Rote Island, Indonesia.
