= Bostrycapulus heteropoma =

Scientific classification
- Kingdom: Animalia
- Phylum: Mollusca
- Class: Gastropoda
- Subclass: Caenogastropoda
- Order: Littorinimorpha
- Family: Calyptraeidae
- Genus: Bostrycapulus
- Species: B. heteropoma

Binomial name
- Bostrycapulus heteropoma Collin & Rolán, 2010

Species of gastropod

Bostrycapulus heteropoma is a species of sea snail, a marine gastropod mollusk in the family Calyptraeidae, the slipper snails or slipper limpets, cup-and-saucer snails, and Chinese hat snails.

== Distribution ==
Senegal
