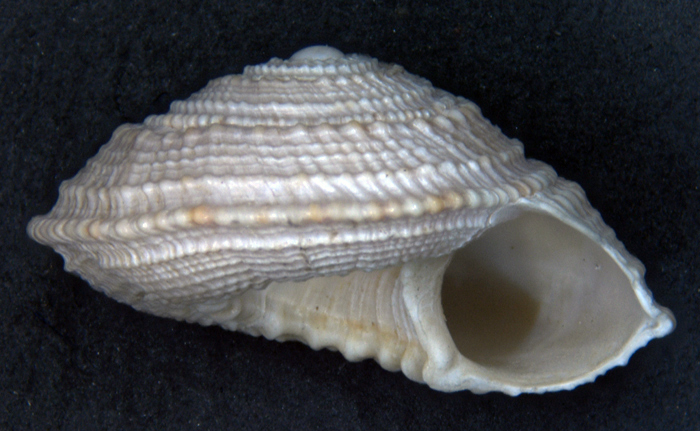
- Apertural view of a shell of S. cabrali

Scientific classification
- Kingdom: Animalia
- Phylum: Mollusca
- Class: Gastropoda
- Family: Architectonicidae
- Genus: Solatisonax
- Species: S. cabrali

Binomial name
- Solatisonax cabrali Tenório, Barros, Francisco & Silva, 2011

= Solatisonax cabrali =

Species of mollusc

Solatisonax cabrali is a species of deep-water sea snail, a marine gastropod mollusk in the family Architectonicidae, the staircase shells or sundials.

== Taxonomy ==
The description of Solatisonax cabrali by Tenório and colleagues, in 2011, was initially based on four young and eroded juvenile shells. The subsequent discovery of two well-preserved empty shells from southeastern Brazil (a juvenile and an adult specimen) brought new information on the species' distribution, ontogeny and morphology, which culminated in a redescription by Cavallari and colleagues in 2013. A few mix-ups involving type specimen figuration and measurements in the original description were also stressed and rectified in the redescription. S. cabrali was named after Brazilian government employee Enilson Cabral, an analyst of the Brazilian Institute of Environment and Renewable Natural Resources (IBAMA) responsible for collecting the materials used in Tenório's study.

== Description ==
Solatisonax cabrali has a small, relatively thick-walled shell, with a maximum known diameter of 7.7 mm (0.30 in) and up to 5 whorls. The outer surface of the shell is almost thoroughly ornamented by spiral and axial nodose cords and threads. Its outline changes along the ontogeny, from disk-shaped during the earliest stages of development to depressed cone-shaped in adult specimens. Similarly, the shell's basal region is more inflated than the upper side in younger specimens, but in adult individuals this relationship is inversed. The dome-shaped, inflated protoconch is considered small for an architectonicid as defined by Bieler (1993), ranging from 0.75 mm (0.030 in) to 0.88 mm (0.035 in) at 1.5 whorl. It has a glossy surface and a strong terminal varix marking the protoconch-teleoconch transition. Shell color is variable from pale beige to white, with scattered beige spots. Since no living specimens of S. cabrali were collected to date, the operculum, as well as any details of the animal's soft parts are yet to be described.

== Ecology ==
Distribution and habitat

Solatisonax cabrali is known only from Brazilian waters, ranging from Pernambuco and Alagoas to Rio de Janeiro and São Paulo states. It can be found at depths of 230–720 m, usually on sandy and muddy bottoms. The species' range was greatly expanded in the redescription, and includes petroleum extraction sites such as the Campos Basin.
