= Alvania baldoi =

Scientific classification
- Kingdom: Animalia
- Phylum: Mollusca
- Class: Gastropoda
- Subclass: Caenogastropoda
- Order: Littorinimorpha
- Superfamily: Rissooidea
- Family: Rissoidae
- Genus: Alvania
- Species: †A. baldoi

Binomial name
- †Alvania baldoi Garilli & Parrinello, 2010

Species of gastropod

Alvania baldoi is an extinct species of minute sea snail, a marine gastropod mollusc or micromollusk in the family Rissoidae.

== Distribution ==
Fossils of this species were found in late Cenozoic strata in Italy.
