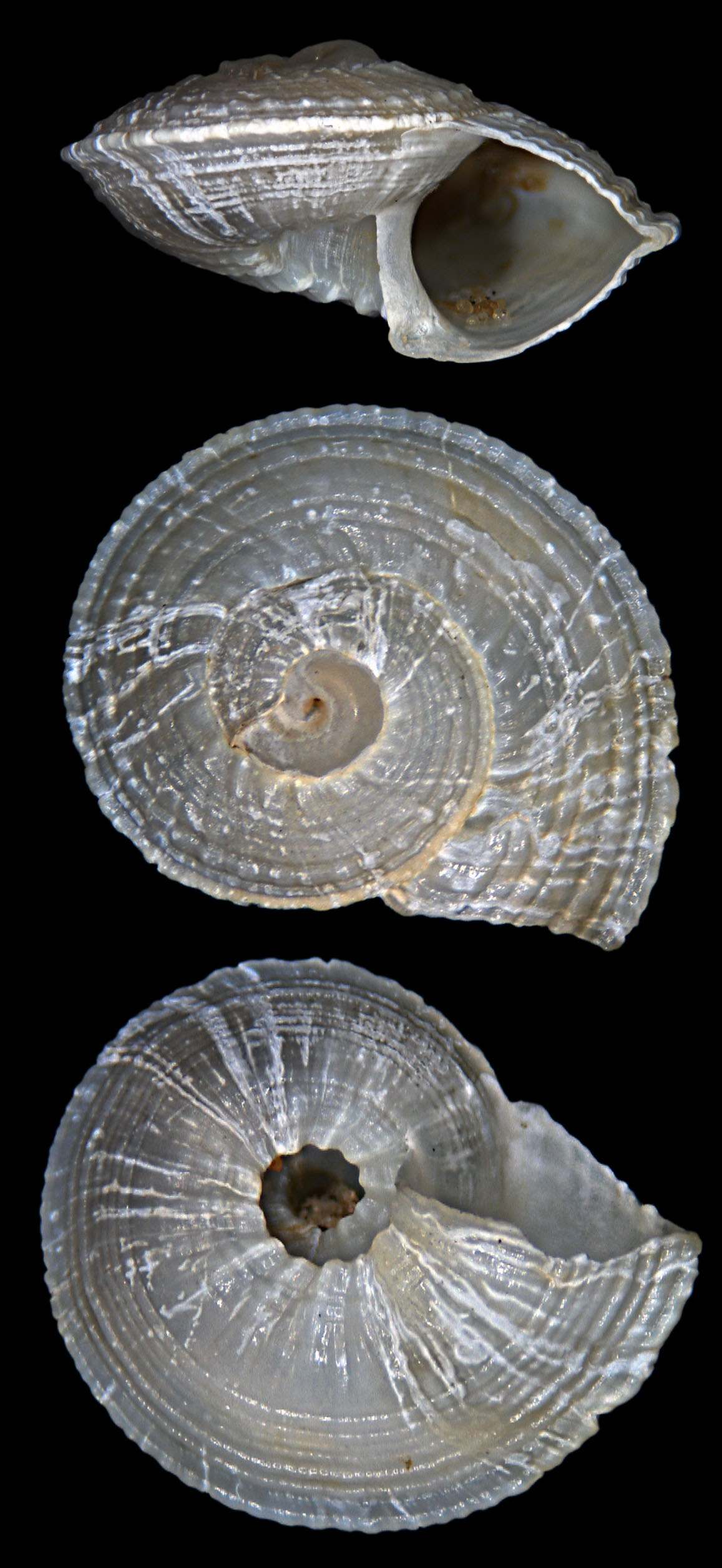
- Different views of a shell of S. rudigerbieleri

Scientific classification
- Kingdom: Animalia
- Phylum: Mollusca
- Class: Gastropoda
- Family: Architectonicidae
- Genus: Solatisonax
- Species: S. rudigerbieleri

Binomial name
- Solatisonax rudigerbieleri Tenório, Barros, Francisco & Silva, 2011

= Solatisonax rudigerbieleri =

Species of mollusc

Solatisonax rudigerbieleri is a species of deep-water sea snail, a marine gastropod mollusk in the family Architectonicidae, the staircase shells or sundials.
