= Plagiostropha bicolor =

Scientific classification
- Kingdom: Animalia
- Phylum: Mollusca
- Class: Gastropoda
- Subclass: Caenogastropoda
- Order: Neogastropoda
- Superfamily: Conoidea
- Family: Drilliidae
- Genus: Plagiostropha
- Species: P. bicolor

Binomial name
- Plagiostropha bicolor Chino & Stahlschmidt, 2010

Species of gastropod

Plagiostropha bicolor is a species of sea snail, a marine gastropod mollusk in the family Drilliidae.

== Description ==
The length of the shell varies between 9 mm and 14 mm.

== Distribution ==
This marine species occurs off the Philippines and Japan.
