= Malacology =

Study of molluscs

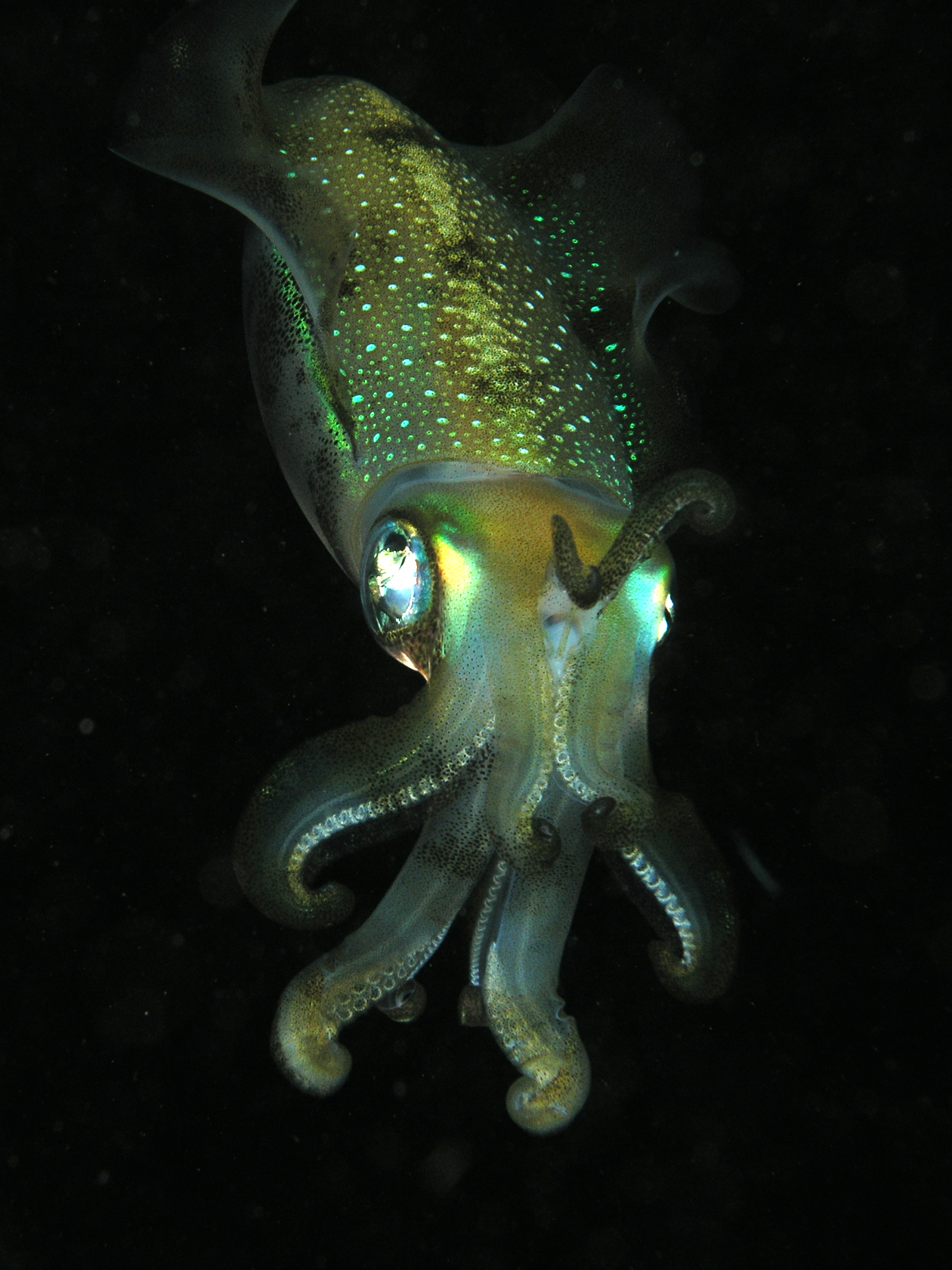
A bigfin reef squid displaying considerably developed ocular, locomotive, and bioluminescent organs, all particularly of interest to the malacological study of its class Cephalopoda

Malacology, (Note: From the French malacologie, contraction of malacozoologie; from the Neo-Latin Malacozoa, 'zoological group including soft-bodied animals'; from Ancient Greek μαλακός (malakós) 'soft' and ζῷον (zôion) 'animal'.) from Ancient Greek μαλακός (malakós), meaning "soft", and λόγος (lógos), meaning "study", is the branch of invertebrate zoology that deals with the study of the Mollusca (molluscs or mollusks), the second-largest phylum of animals in terms of described species after the arthropods. Mollusks include snails and slugs, clams, and cephalopods, along with numerous other kinds, many of which have shells.

Fields within malacological research include studies of mollusk taxonomy, ecology and evolution. Several subdivisions of malacology exist, including conchology, devoted to the study of mollusk shells, limacology, the study of gastropods, and teuthology, the study of cephalopods such as octopus, squid, and cuttlefish. Applied malacology studies medical, veterinary, and agricultural applications, for example the study of mollusks as vectors of schistosomiasis and other diseases.

Zoological methods are used in malacological research. Malacological field methods and laboratory methods (such as collecting, documenting and archiving, and molecular techniques) were summarized by Sturm et al. (2006).

== History ==
The study of mollusks long predates the modern field of malacology. Aristotle included what we now call mollusks in his Historia animalium as two separate groups: testaceans (Ostracoderma) and mollusks (Malakia). In 1758, Linnaeus included modern mollusks in the class Vermes, under the orders Intestina, Mollusca, and Testacea. At this time, taxonomy was largely based on shells, as examining internal anatomy was thought to be too challenging due to lack of specimens.

In 1795, French naturalist Georges Cuvier described a combined taxon of both shelled and non-shelled mollusks as a distinct group based on internal characteristics of "oviparous reproduction, white blood, existence of heart, blood vessels and gills, liver" and external characteristics of "mantle and tentacles." However, he retained conchological methods for separating genera.

The term "malacology" was invented by Constantine Samuel Rafinesque-Schmaltz in 1814 and, probably independently, by Ducrotay de Blainville in 1825.

== Malacologists ==
Those who study malacology are known as malacologists. Those who study primarily or exclusively the shells of mollusks are known as conchologists, while those who study mollusks of the class Cephalopoda are teuthologists.

== Societies ==
- Argentine Malacological Society (Asociación Argentina de Malacología)
- American Malacological Society
- Association of Polish Malacologists (Stowarzyszenie Malakologów Polskich)
- Belgian Malacological Society (Société Belge de Malacologie) – French speaking
- Belgian Society for Conchology – Dutch speaking
- Brazilian Malacological Society (Sociedade Brasileira de Malacologia)
- Conchological Society of Great Britain and Ireland
- Conchologists of America
- Dutch Malacological Society
- Estonian Malacological Society
- European Quaternary Malacologists
- Freshwater Mollusk Conservation Society
- German Malacological Society (Deutsche Malakozoologische Gesellschaft)
- Hungarian Malacological Society (Magyar Malakológiai Társaság)
- Italian Malacological Society (Società Italiana di Malacologia)
- Malacological Society of Australasia
- Malacological Society of London
- Malacological Society of the Philippines, Inc.
- Mexican Malacological Society (Sociedad Mexicana de Malacología y Conquiliología)
- Spanish Malacological Society (Sociedad Española de Malacología)
- Western Society of Malacologists

== Journals ==
More than 150 journals within the field of malacology are being published from more than 30 countries, producing an overwhelming amount of scientific articles. They include:

- American Journal of Conchology (1865–1872)
- American Malacological Bulletin
- Archiv für Molluskenkunde
- Basteria
- Bulletin of Russian Far East Malacological Society
- Fish & Shellfish Immunology
- Folia conchyliologica
- Folia Malacologica
- Heldia
- Johnsonia
- Journal de Conchyliologie – volumes 1850–1922 at Biodiversity Heritage Library; volumes 1850–1938 at Bibliothèque nationale de France
- Journal of Conchology
- Journal of Medical and Applied Malacology
- Journal of Molluscan Studies
- Malacologia
- Malacologica Bohemoslovaca
- Malacological Review – volume 1 (1968) – today, contents of volume 27 (1996) – volume 40 (2009)
- Soosiana
- Zeitschrift für Malakozoologie (1844–1853) → Malakozoologische Blätter (1854–1878)
- Miscellanea Malacologica
- Mollusca
- Molluscan Research – impact factor: 0.606 (2007)
- Mitteilungen der Deutschen Malakozoologischen Gesellschaft
- Occasional Molluscan Papers (since 2008)
- Occasional Papers on Mollusks (1945–1989), 5 volumes
- Ruthenica
- Strombus
- Tentacle – The Newsletter of the Mollusc Specialist Group of the Species Survival Commission of the International Union for Conservation of Nature.
- The Conchologist (1891–1894) → The Journal of Malacology (1894–1905)
- The Festivus – a journal which started as a club newsletter in 1970, published by the San Diego Shell Club
- The Nautilus – since 1886 published by Bailey-Matthews Shell Museum. First two volumes were published under name The Conchologists’ Exchange. Impact factor: 0.500 (2009)
- The Veliger – impact factor: 0.606 (2003)
- 貝類学雑誌 Venus (Japanese Journal of Malacology)
- Vita Malacologica a Dutch journal published in English – one themed issue a year
- Vita Marina (discontinued in May 2001)

== Museums ==
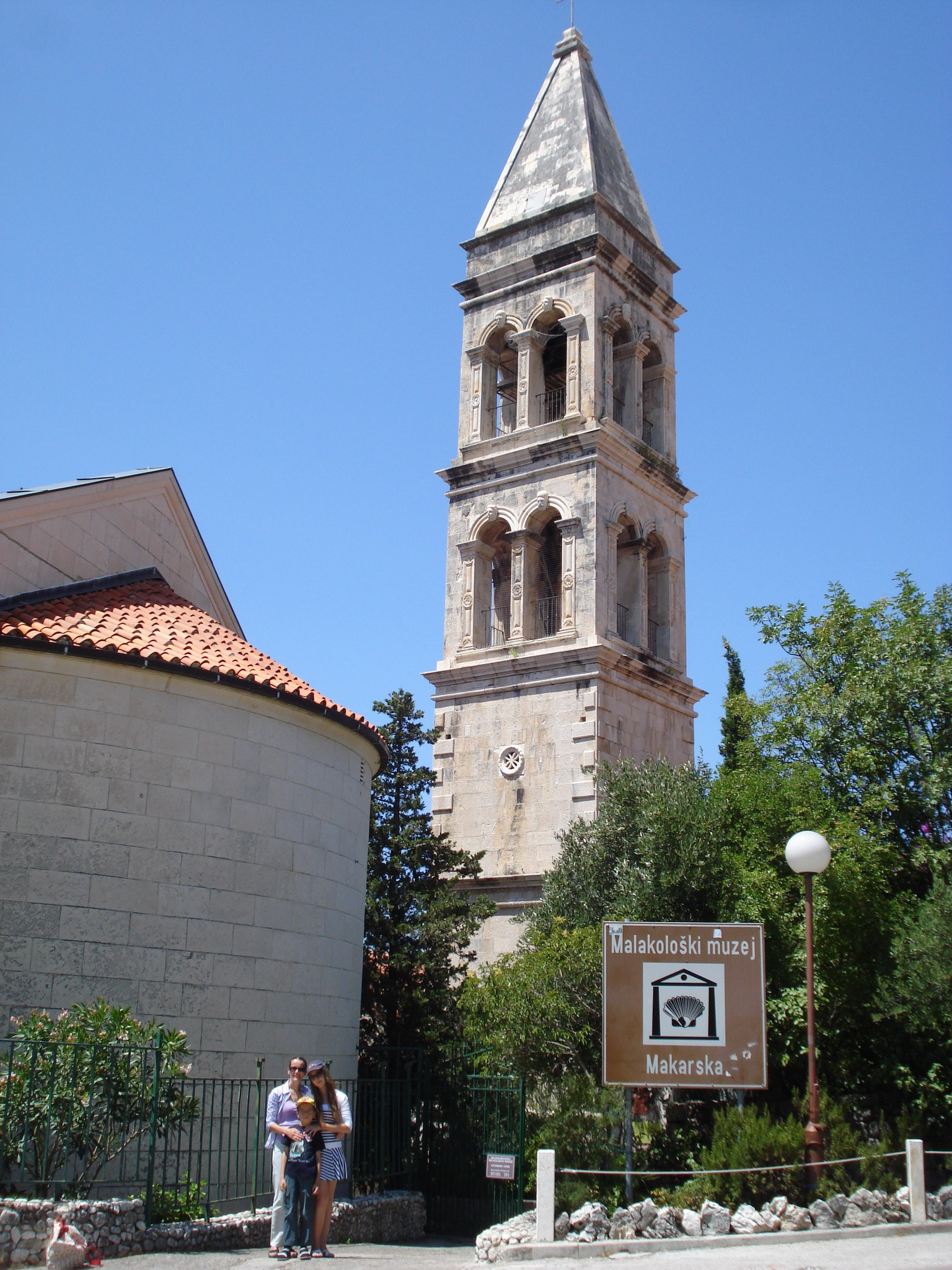
Malacological Museum in Makarska, Croatia (entrance)

Museums that have either exceptional malacological research collections (behind the scenes) and/or exceptional public exhibits of mollusks:

- Academy of Natural Sciences of Philadelphia
- American Museum of Natural History
- Bailey-Matthews Shell Museum
- Cau del Cargol Shell Museum
- Maria Mitchell Association
- Museum of Comparative Zoology at Harvard
- National Museum of Natural History, France
- Natural History Museum, London
- Rinay
- Royal Belgian Institute of Natural Sciences, Brussels: with a collection of more than 9 million shells (mainly from the collection of Philippe Dautzenberg)
- Smithsonian Institution

== See also ==
- Invertebrate paleontology
- History of invertebrate paleozoology
- Treatise on Invertebrate Paleontology
