= Alvania dimitrii =

Scientific classification
- Kingdom: Animalia
- Phylum: Mollusca
- Class: Gastropoda
- Subclass: Caenogastropoda
- Order: Littorinimorpha
- Superfamily: Rissooidea
- Family: Rissoidae
- Genus: Alvania
- Species: †A. dimitrii

Binomial name
- †Alvania dimitrii Garilli & Parrinello, 2010

Species of gastropod

Alvania dimitrii is an extinct species of minute sea snail, a marine gastropod mollusk or micromollusk in the family Rissoidae.

== Distribution ==
Fossils were found in Late Cenozoic strata in Italy.
