= Molluscan Research =

- Discipline: Malacology
- Language: English
- Edited by: D.J. Colgan

Publication details
- Former name(s): Journal of the Malacological Society of Australia
- History: 1957–present
- Publisher: Taylor & Francis (Australia)
- Frequency: Quarterly
- Open access: Hybrid
- Impact factor: 0.803 (2021)

Standard abbreviations
- ISO 4: Molluscan Res.

Indexing
- CODEN: MROEAT
- ISSN: 1323-5818 (print); 1448-6067 (web)
- LCCN: sn95043523
- OCLC no.: 615391147

Links
- Journal homepage; Online access; Online archive

Molluscan Research is a quarterly peer-reviewed scientific journal covering the field of malacology with a preference for studies focusing on Australia and surrounding regions. The journal was established in 1957 as the Journal of the Malacological Society of Australia, obtaining its current name in 1994. It was published by CSIRO from 2002 to 2004 (volumes 22 to 24), then from 2004 to 2012 by Magnolia Press (volumes 25 to 32). Since 2013 the journal has been published by Taylor & Francis and the editor-in-chief is D.J. Colgan (Australian Museum).

== Abstracting and indexing ==
The journal is abstracted and indexed in:

- Aquatic Sciences and Fisheries Abstracts
- Biological Abstracts
- BIOSIS Previews
- CAB Abstracts
- Chemical Abstracts Service
- Current Contents/Agriculture, Biology & Environmental Sciences
- EBSCO databases
- Science Citation Index Expanded
- Scopus
- The Zoological Record

According to the Journal Citation Reports, the journal has a 2021 impact factor of 0.803.
