= The Veliger =

- Discipline: Malacology
- Language: English

Publication details
- History: 1958-2014
- Publisher: California Malacozoological Society and Northern California Malacozoological Club (United States)
- Impact factor: 0.462 (2013)

Standard abbreviations
- ISO 4: Veliger

Indexing
- ISSN: 0042-3211
- LCCN: 65006141
- OCLC no.: 488613692

Links
- Online archive at the Biodiversity Heritage Library

The Veliger was a peer-reviewed scientific journal covering malacology. The journal was established in 1958 and published its last issue in September, 2014. It was published by the California Malacozoological Society and Northern California Malacozoological Club.

== Abstracting and indexing ==
The journal is abstracted and indexed by:

- Science Citation Index Expanded
- Current Contents/Agriculture, Biology & Environmental Sciences
- The Zoological Record
- BIOSIS Previews
- Scopus

According to the Journal Citation Reports, the journal has a 2013 impact factor of 0.462.

== Hijacking ==
In March 2015 it was reported that The Veliger had been hijacked by a journal calling itself Veliger: An International Journal in Science. In contrast to the real journal, the fake one has a website, and covers all areas of science. Although authors need to pay a high article processing charge to have their articles published, only paid subscribers to the fake journal can access them. The fake journal links to the archives of the real one, and gives the impression that the impact factor and inclusion in Scopus and Thomson Reuters databases of the latter also applies to them.
