= Proceedings of the Academy of Natural Sciences of Philadelphia =

- Discipline: Natural sciences
- Language: English

Publication details
- History: 1841-present
- Publisher: Academy of Natural Sciences of Drexel University (United States)

Standard abbreviations
- ISO 4: Proc. Acad. Nat. Sci. Phila.

Indexing
- CODEN: PANPA5
- ISSN: 0097-3157 (print); 1938-5293 (web)
- LCCN: 12030019
- OCLC no.: 1382862

Links
- Journal homepage

The Proceedings of the Academy of Natural Sciences of Philadelphia is a peer-reviewed scientific journal published by Academy of Natural Sciences of Drexel University since 1841.
