= Basteria =

- Discipline: Malacology
- Language: English, Dutch, German
- Edited by: Ruud Bank

Publication details
- History: 1936–present
- Publisher: Netherlands Malacological Society (Netherlands)
- Frequency: Bimonthly

Standard abbreviations
- ISO 4: Basteria

Indexing
- ISSN: 0005-6219
- OCLC no.: 2052995

Links
- Journal homepage; Online archive

Basteria is a bimonthly peer-reviewed scientific journal published by the Netherlands Malacological Society, covering research on molluscs. It was established in 1936 and is now published mostly in English. The editor-in-chief is Ruud Bank. A former editor-in-chief is Adolph Cornelis van Bruggen.

The journal is named after Job Baster, a Dutch naturalist of the 18th century.
