= Archiv für Molluskenkunde =

Academic journal

- Discipline: Malacology
- Language: English
- Edited by: J.M.C. Hutchinson, H. Reise, K. Schniebs, J. Sigwart

Publication details
- History: 1868–present
- Publisher: Senckenberg Gesellschaft für Naturforschung (Germany)
- Frequency: Biannual
- Open access: After 4 years
- Impact factor: 0.966 (2019)

Standard abbreviations
- ISO 4: Arch. Molluskenkd.

Indexing
- ISSN: 1869-0963
- OCLC no.: 225396501

Links
- Journal homepage; Online archive

Archiv für Molluskenkunde is a peer-reviewed scientific journal published by the Senckenberg Nature Research Society, covering research in malacology.

== Coverage ==
Archiv für Molluskenkunde publishes original research on all aspects of molluscan biodiversity, mostly on systematics, taxonomy, phylogeny and morphology, also accepting research on the ecology and biogeography of all groups of molluscs, both living and fossil (Cenozoic only). Articles are published in English.

== History ==
Archiv für Molluskenkunde derives from the Nachrichtsblatt der Deutschen Malakozoologischen Gesellschaft [Newsletter of the German Malacological Society], first published in 1868. Hence it is the oldest malacological journal still publishing. The name changed in 1921, but the numbering of volumes runs continuously between the titles. The parent society transferred ownership of the journal to the Senckenberg Nature Research Society in 1936 in order to avoid government (Nazi) interference. Senckenberg subsidises the journal and its museum curators act as editors.

== Journal ranking scores ==
Impact Factor (2019) = 0.966. CiteScore (2020) = 1.4; SCImago Journal Rank (2019) = 0.522; SNIP (2019) = 1.078.

== Abstracting and indexing ==
The journal is abstracted and indexed by Science Citation Index Expanded (SCIE), Aquaculture and Fisheries Resources, Aquatic Biology, Aquatic Sciences & Fisheries Abstracts, Biological Abstracts (Biosis Philadelphia), Biosis previews, Fish and Fisheries Worldwide (FFW), GEOBASE, Scopus and Zoological Record.
