= Journal of Conchology =

- Discipline: Malacology
- Language: English
- Edited by: Robert G Forsyth

Publication details
- History: 1879-present
- Publisher: The Conchological Society of Great Britain and Ireland (United Kingdom)
- Frequency: Biannual
- Impact factor: 1.1 (2025)

Standard abbreviations
- ISO 4: J. Conchol.

Indexing
- ISSN: 0022-0019
- OCLC no.: 6988449

Links
- Journal homepage; Online archive

The Journal of Conchology is a peer-reviewed scientific journal published by The Conchological Society of Great Britain and Ireland, covering research in conchology and malacology. It claims to be the world's oldest continuing publication on the subject.

The journal publishes original research and short communications on molluscs, with emphasis on conservation, biogeography and taxonomy. The contents include descriptions of new species from anywhere in the world, and reports concerning the ecology, distribution, and status of molluscs, both living and fossil.
