= List of malacologists =

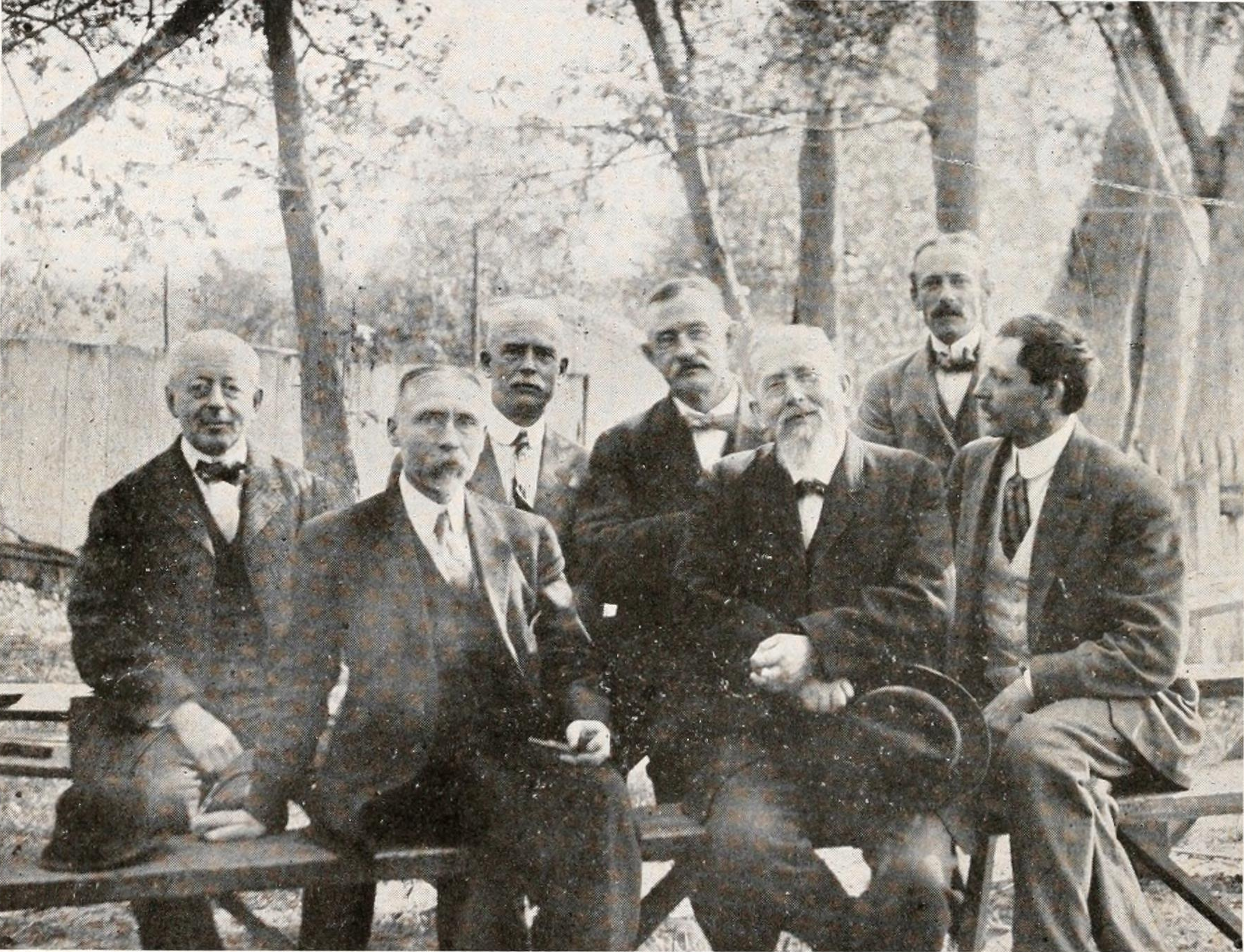
American malacologists at a Washington meeting in 1914. Bryant Walker (1856–1936) (back left), George Hubbard Clapp (1858–1949), Truman Heminway Aldrich (1848–1932), John Brooks Henderson Jr. (1870–1923) (back right), Henry Augustus Pilsbry (1862–1957) (front left), William Healey Dall (1845–1927) (front center), Paul Bartsch (1871–1960) (front right).

This is a list of malacologists, scientists who study mollusks, such as snails, clams, cephalopods, and others, in a discipline named malacology. People who specialize in studying only or primarily the shells of mollusks are sometimes called conchologists instead of malacologists. Many of these malacologists are notable for having named species and other taxa of mollusks.

This list focuses primarily on people who study or studied recent taxa of mollusks rather than fossil mollusks, so only a few paleontologists are included here. The list also includes researchers who devoted some of their research effort to malacology and some to other sciences.

Considering that mollusks are such a very large and diverse phylum of invertebrates, malacology in general is greatly understaffed in its research efforts. For example, there is no living malacological expert who can properly identify all the species of Onchidiidae (about 143 species). There are also not enough malacologists studying freshwater snails.

== A ==
- Donald Putnam Abbott (1920–1986) United States
- R. Tucker Abbott (1919–1995) United States
- William Adam (1909–1988) Belgium
- Arthur Adams (1820–1878) United Kingdom (brother of Henry Adams)
- Charles Baker Adams (1814–1853) United States
- Henry Adams (1813–1877) United Kingdom (brother of Arthur Adams)
- Johann Christian Albers (1795–1857) Germany
- Joshua Alder (1792–1867) United Kingdom
- Frederick Aldrich (1927–1991) United States
- Truman Heminway Aldrich (1848–1932) United States, civil engineer and paleontologist
- César Marie Félix Ancey (1860–1906) France
- George French Angas (1822–1886) United Kingdom
- John Gould Anthony (1804-1877) United States
- Hermann Eduard Anton (1794–1872) Germany
- Allan Frost Archer (1908-1994) United States
- Edwin Ashby (1861–1941) Australia, expert in chitons
- Jean Victoire Audouin (1797–1841) France

== B ==
- Kikutaro Baba (1905–2001) Japan
- Fred Baker (1854–1938) United States
- Horace Burrington Baker (1889–1971), American malacologist
- David Dwight Baldwin (1831–1912), Hawaii, United StatesA. Studied land snails of Hawaii.
- Keppel Harcourt Barnard (1887–1964) South Africa
- Paul Bartsch (1871–1960) American malacologist and carcinologist of German origin
- Frederick Bayer (1921–2007) United States
- Arthur René Jean Baptiste Bavay (1840–1923) France
- Richard Henry Beddome (1830–1911) England
- Henrik Henriksen Beck (1799–1863) Denmark
- Luigi Bellardi (1818–1889) Italy
- William Henry Benson (1803–1870), malacologist "United Kingdom/India/South Africa"
- Joseph Charles Bequaert (1886–1982) Belgium, United States
- David J Berg United States
- Leszek Berger (1925–2012) Poland
- Rudolph Bergh (1824–1909) Denmark
- Samuel Stillman Berry (1887-1984)
- Rüdiger Bieler (born 1955)
- Amos Binney (1803–1847) United States
- William G. Binney (1833–1909) United States
- Caroline Birley (1851–1907) England
- Hope Black (1919–2018) Australia
- Henri Marie Ducrotay de Blainville (1777–1850) France
- Willis Blatchley (1859–1940) United States
- Caesar Rudolf Boettger (1888–1976) Germany
- Oskar Boettger (1844–1910) Germany
- Mia Boissevain (1878–1959) Netherlands
- Ignaz von Born (1742–1791) Austria
- Filippo Bonanni (1638–1723) Italy
- Kristine Elisabeth Heuch Bonnevie (1872–1948) biologist and Norway's first female professor
- Nicolas Robert Bouchard-Chantereaux (1802–1864) France
- Philippe Bouchet (1953–) France
- Jules René Bourguignat (1829–1892) France
- Thomas Edward Bowdich (1791–1824) England
- John William Brazier (1842–1930) Australia
- William Broderip (1789–1859) England
- Captain Thomas Brown (1785–1862) United Kingdom
- Adolph Cornelis van Bruggen (A. C. van Bruggen, Dolf van Bruggen) (1929–2016) Netherlands and South Africa
- Jean Guillaume Bruguière (1749–1798) France
- Spiridon Brusina (1845–1909) Croatia
- Rykel de Bruyne Netherlands
- James Bulwer (1794–1879) England
- John B. Burch (1929–) United States
- Robert Burn (1937–) Australia

== C ==
- Frédéric Cailliaud (1787–1869) France
- Alfred de Candie de Saint-Simon (1731–1851) Toulouse, France.
- Philip Pearsall Carpenter (1819–1877) England
- Thomas Frederic Cheeseman (1845–1923) New Zealand
- Johann Hieronymus Chemnitz (1730–1800) Germany
- Jean-Charles Chenu (1808–1879) France
- Carl Chun (1852–1914) Germany
- George Hubbard Clapp (1858–1949) United States
- William J. Clench (1897–1984) United States
- Stefan Clessin (1833–1911) Germany
- Theodore Dru Alison Cockerell (1866–1948) United States
- Walter Edward Collinge (1867–1947) United Kingdom
- Matthew William Kemble Connolly (1872–1947) United Kingdom and South Africa
- Timothy Abbott Conrad (1803-1877) United States
- Charles Montague Cooke, Jr. (1874–1948) Hawaii
- William Cooper (1798–1864) United States
- Alexandre Édouard Maurice Cossmann (1850–1924) France
- Bernard Charles Cotton (1905-1966) Australia
- James Hamilton Couper (1794–1866) United States
- Joseph Pitty Couthouy (1808–1864) United States
- Georges Coutagne (1854–1928) France
- James Charles Cox [M.D.] (1834–1912) Australia
- Leslie Reginald Cox (1897–1965) United Kingdom
- Percy Zachariah Cox [Major General, Sir] (1864–1937) United Kingdom and Iran
- Henry Crampton (1875–1956) United States
- Joseph Charles Hippolyte Crosse (1826–1898) France
- Cyril Crossland (1878–1943) England
- Hugh Cuming (1791–1865) England
- Georges Cuvier (1769–1832) France

== D ==
- Dezallier d'Argenville (1680–1765) France
- Emanuel Mendes da Costa (1717–1791) England
- William Healey Dall (1845–1927) United States
- Philippe Dautzenberg (1849–1935) Belgian
- Léopold de Folin (1817–1896) France
- Jacques Louis Marin DeFrance (1758–1850) France
- Pierre Denys de Montfort (1766–1820) France
- Richard Dell (1920–2002) New Zealand
- Gérard Paul Deshayes (1795–1875) France
- Charles des Moulins (1798–1875) France
- Lewis Weston Dillwyn (1778–1855) United Kingdom
- Heinrich Wolfgang Ludwig Dohrn (1838–1913) Germany, also entomologist
- Edward Donovan (1768–1837) Ireland
- Alcide d'Orbigny (1802–1857) France
- Jacques Philippe Raymond Draparnaud (1772–1804) France
- Wilhelm Dunker (1809–1885) Germany

== E ==
- Charles Eliot, full name: Sir Charles Norton Edgcumbe Eliot (1862–1931)
- Arthur Erskine Ellis (1902–1983) United Kingdom
- William Keith Emerson (1925–2016) United States
- Bob Entrop (1917–1987) Netherlands

== F ==
- Paul Fagot (1842–1908) French malacologist
- Jules Favre (1882–1959) Switzerland
- James Ferriss (1849–1926) United States
- André Étienne d'Audebert de Férussac (1786–1836) France, also a naturalist
- Henri Filhol (1843–1902) France
- Harold John Finlay (1901–1951) New Zealand palaeontologist and conchologist
- Julian K. Finn (1970s–) Australia
- Paul Henri Fischer (1835 – 1893) France
- John Fleming (1785–1857) Scotland
- Léopold de Folin (1817–1896) France
- Charles-François Fontannes (1839–1886) France
- Edward Forbes (1815–1845) United Kingdom
- Lothar H.E.W. Forcart (1902–1990) Switzerland
- André Franc (1911–1990s) France

== G ==
- Charles John Gabriel (1879–1963) Australia
- Joseph Paul Gaimard (1796–1858) France
- Andrew Garrett (1823–1887) United States
- Louis Germain (1878–1942) France
- David Geyer (1855–1932) Germany
- Theodore Gill (1837–1914) United States
- Gonzalo Giribet (1970–) Spain. United States
- Johann Friedrich Gmelin (1748–1804) Germany
- Henry Haversham Godwin-Austen (1834–1923) United Kingdom, British India
- Augustus Addison Gould (1805–1866) United States
- Stephen Jay Gould (1941–2002) United States, paleontologist who also studied land snails.
- Alastair Graham (1906–2000) United Kingdom
- Jean-Pierre Sylvestre de Grateloup (1782–1862) France
- Edward Whitaker Gray (1748–1806) United Kingdom
- Elizabeth Gray (1831–1924) United Kingdom
- Francis Calley Gray (1790–1856) United States
- John Edward Gray (1800–1875) United Kingdom
- Maria Emma Gray (1787–1876) United Kingdom, wife of John Edward Gray
- Russell Gray (died 1948) United States
- Samuel Frederick Gray (1766–1828) United Kingdom
- Georg Grimpe (1889–1936) Germany
- Karl Grobben (1854–1945) Austria
- Simon James Grove Australia, malacologist & entomologist
- Niccolò Gualtieri (1688–1744) Italy
- Gerard Pierre Laurent Kalshoven Gude (1858–1924) United Kingdom
- John Thomas Gulick (1832–1923) Hawaii, developed evolution theories with Charles Darwin
- Robert John Lechmere Guppy (1836–1916) Trinidad.

== H ==
- Fritz Haas (1886–1969) Germany
- Georg Haas (1905–1981) Israel
- Samuel Stehman Haldeman (1812–1880) United States
- Sylvanus Charles Thorp Hanley (1819–1899) United Kingdom
- Elizabeth Harper (1965–) United Kingdom
- Johan Conrad van Hasselt (1797–1823) vertebratologist, he also studied mollusks from Java
- Gerhard Haszprunar (1957–) Austria
- Bernhard Hausdorf, Germany
- William H. Heard (1935–) United States
- Charles Hedley (1862–1926) United Kingdom, but mostly active in Australia
- Friedrich Held (1812–1872) Germany
- Joseph Heller (1941–) Israel
- Henry Hemphill (1830–1914) United States
- John Brooks Henderson Jr. (1870–1923) United States
- Junius Henderson (1865–1937) United States
- Leo George Hertlein (1898–1972) United States
- Pierre Marie Heude (1836–1902) France
- Joaquín González Hidalgo y Rodríguez (1839–1923), Spain
- Richard Brinsley Hinds (1811–1846) United Kingdom
- Shintarō Hirase 平瀬 信太郎 (Hirase Shintarō) (1884–1939) Japan
- Yoichirō Hirase 平瀬 与一郎 (Hirase Yoichirō) (1859–1925) Japan, father of Shintarō Hirase
- Frederick George "Eric" Hochberg (1941–2023), United States
- Hans Hoffmann (1896-1947) Germany
- William Evans Hoyle (1855–1926) United Kingdom
- Thomas George Bond Howes (1853–1905) United Kingdom
- Leslie Hubricht (1908–2005) United States
- George Humphrey (1739–1826) United Kingdom
- Christian Hee Hwass (1731–1803) Denmark

== I ==
- Tom Iredale (1880–1972) England
- Arturo Issel (1842–1922) Italy

== J ==
- John Clarkson Jay (1808–1891) American amateur conchologist.
- John Gwyn Jeffreys (1809–1885) United Kingdom
- Charles Willison Johnson (1863–1932) American naturalist and malacologist
- George Johnston (1797–1855) British malacologist
- Israel Heymann Jonas (1795–1851) German malacologist
- Jess Jones United States
- Louis Joubin (1861–1935) France
- Félix Pierre Jousseaume (1835–1921) France

== K ==
- Sally Diana Kaicher (1922–1999) United States, Author and Illustrator: Card Catalogue of Worldwide Shells, 1973-1992
- E. Alison Kay (1928–2008) United States
- Myra Keen (1905–1986) United States
- Louis Charles Kiener (1799–1891) France
- Richard Kilburn (1942–2013) South Africa
- Thomas William Kirk (1856–1936) New Zealand
- Jared Potter Kirtland (1793–1877) United States
- Wilhelm Kobelt (1840–1916) Germany
- Yoshio Kondo (1910–1990) Hawaii
- Dieter Korn (1958–) Germany
- Christian Ferdinand Friedrich Krauss (1812–1890) Germany
- Endre Krolopp (1935–2010) Hungary, interested in Quaternary and Tertiary molluscs
- Tokubei Kuroda (1886–1987) Japan
- Heinrich Carl Küster (1807–1876) Germany

== L ==
- Henri de Lacaze-Duthiers (1821–1901) France
- Frank Fortescue Laidlaw (1876–1963) United Kingdom
- Jean-Baptiste Lamarck (1744–1829) France
- Charles Francis Laseron (1887–1959) United States, Australia
- Isaac Lea (1792–1886) United States
- José H. Leal Brazil
- Henning Mourier Lemche (1904–1977) Denmark
- Andrzej Lesicki (1950–)Poland
- Michele Lessona (1823–1894) Italy
- Mario Lessona (1855–1911) Italy
- John Lightfoot (1735–1788) United Kingdom
- David R. Lindberg (born 1948) United States
- Vasiliy Lindholm (1874–1935) Russia
- Karl Emil Lischke – de:Karl Emil Lischke fr:Karl Emil Lischke (1813–1886) Germany
- Martin Lister (1639–1712) first British conchologist
- Arnould Locard (1841–1904) France
- Richard Thomas Lowe (1802–1874) United Kingdom
- Sven Ludvig Lovén (1809–1895) Sweden, marine zoologist and malacologist

== M ==
- Jules François Mabille (1831–1904) France
- Frank Mace MacFarland (1869–1951) United States, Hopkins Marine Biological Station at Pacific Grove
- William Macnae (1914–1975) South Africa.
- Virginia Orr Maes (1920–1986) United States, malacologist associated with the Academy of Natural Sciences of Philadelphia
- August Wilhelm Malm (1821–1882) Sweden
- Jiro Makiyama (1896-1986) Japan
- Hermann von Maltzan (1843–1891) Germany
- Katharina Mangold-Wirz (1922–2003) Switzerland
- Ernst Gustav Gotthelf Marcus (Ernesto) (1893–1968) Germany, Brazil, spouse of Eveline du Bois-Reymond Marcus
- Eveline Du Bois-Reymond Marcus (1901–1990) Germany, Brazil
- Bruce Marshall (1948–) New Zealand, taxonomist
- Patrick Marshall (1869–1950) New Zealand, geologist
- Eduard von Martens (1831–1904) Germany
- Friedrich Wilhelm Martini (1729–1778) Germany
- Thomas Martyn (1760–1816) England
- Annie Massy (1868–1931) Ireland
- Charles Johnson Maynard (1845–1929) United States
- J. C. McConnell (1844–1904) United States
- James Hamilton McLean (1936–) United States
- James Cosmo Melvill (1845–1929) United Kingdom
- Auguste Ménégaux (1857–1937) France
- Karl Theodor Menke (1791–1861) Germany
- Artie L. Metcalf (1929–2016) United States
- Friedrich Christian Meuschen (1719–1811) Germany
- Louis André Gaspard Michaud (1795–1880) France, malacologist, also known as Gaspard Michaud and as A. L. G. Michaud
- Jean-Louis Hardouin Michelin de Choisy (1786–1867) France
- Jesse Wedgwood Mighels (1795–1861) United States
- John Samuel Miller (1783–1873) United Kingdom
- Pierre-Aimé Millet (1783–1873) France
- Adolph Modéer (1738–1799) Sweden
- Otto Franz von Möllendorff (1848–1903) Germany, malacologist
- Hans Peter Christian Møller (1810–1845) Denmark/Greenland, author of Index Molluscorum Grönlandiae
- Tommaso di Maria Allery Monterosato (1841–1927) Italy
- John Edmund Sharrock Moore (1870–1947) United Kingdom
- Otto Andreas Lowson Mörch (1828–1878) Sweden, Denmark, France
- Pierre Marie Arthur Morelet (1809–1892) France
- Edward Sylvester Morse (1838–1925) United States
- Johann Rudolf Albert Mousson (1805–1890) France, Switzerland
- Robert C. Murdoch (1861–1923) New Zealand

== N ==
- Adolf Naef (1883–1949) Switzerland
- Walter Narchi (1929–2004) Brazil
- Kir Nazimovich Nesis (1934–2003) Russia
- Geoffrey Nevill (1843–1885) United Kingdom
- Wesley Newcomb (1818–1892) United States
- Hugo Frederik Nierstrasz (1872–1937) Netherlands
- Mark Norman (1960s–) Australia
- Jean-Baptiste Noulet (1802–1890) France
- Carlos Núñez Cortés (1942–) Argentina

== O ==
- Charles Henry O'Donoghue (1885–1961) England
- Steve O'Shea (1965–) New Zealand
- Nils Hjalmar Odhner (1884–1973) Sweden
- Takashi A. Okutani (1931–2025) Japan
- William Erwood Old, Jr. (1928–1982) United States
- Ida Shepard Oldroyd (1856–1940) United States
- Tom Shaw Oldroyd (1853–1932) United States
- Walter Reginald Brook Oliver (1883–1957) Australia, New Zealand
- Alcide Charles Victor Marie Dessalines d'Orbigny (1802–1857) France
- Charles Russell Orcutt (1864–1929) United States
- Arnold Edward Ortmann (1863–1927) United States

== P ==
- J.J.I. Alcide de Paladilhe (1814–1876) France
- Paul Maurice Pallary (1869–1942) France/Algeria
- Katherine Evangeline Hilton Van Winkle Palmer (1895–1982) United States, Tertiary molluscs
- Christine Parent Canada, land snails
- Marianna Paulucci (1835–1919) Italy
- William Harper Pease (1824–1871) United States
- Jean Paul Louis Pelseneer (1863–1945) Belgium
- Rémy Perrier (1861–1936) France
- George Perry (1771-18??) United Kingdom, naturalist and malacologist
- Vladimir Pešić Montenegro
- Sauveur Abel Aubert Petit de la Saussaye (1792–1870) France
- Georg Johann Pfeffer (1854–1931) Germany, zoologist
- Carl Jonas Pfeiffer (1779–1836) Germany
- John M. Pfeiffer United States
- Ludwig Karl Georg Pfeiffer (1805–1877) Germany, physician, botanist and conchologist
- Rodolfo Amando Philippi (1808–1904) Germany
- Jean Piaget (1896-1980) Switzerland
- Henry Augustus Pilsbry (1862–1957) United States
- István Pintér (1911–1998) Hungary
- László Ernö Pintér (1942–2002) Hungary
- Giuseppe Saverio Poli (1746–1825) Italy
- Carlo Pollonera (1849–1923) Italy
- Winston Ponder (1941–) New Zealand
- John Ponsonby-Fane (1848–1916) United Kingdom
- Guido Poppe (1954–) Belgian
- Arthur William Baden Powell (1901–1987) New Zealand
- Temple Prime (1832–1903) United States
- Alice Pruvot-Fol (1873–1972) France

== Q ==
- Jean René Constant Quoy (1790–1869) France

== R ==
- Lewis Radcliffe (1880–1950) United States
- Constantine Samuel Rafinesque (1783–1840) Ottoman Empire
- Sander Rang (1793-1844) France
- César Auguste Récluz (1799–1873) France
- Lovell Augustus Reeve (1814–1865) United Kingdom
- Harald Alfred Rehder (1907–1996) United States
- Lois Corea Rehder (1911–1988) United States, spouse of Harald Alfred Rehder
- Amanda L. Reid (1960–) Australia
- Otto Wilhelm Hermann Reinhardt (1838-1924) Germany
- Hendrik van Rijgersma (1835–1877) Netherlands
- Jean Risbec (1895–1964) France
- Antoine Risso (1777–1845) France, naturalist
- Guy Coburn Robson (1888–1945) United Kingdom
- Alphonse Amédée Trémeau de Rochebrune (1836–1912) France
- Jean-Pierre Rocroi France
- Peter Friedrich Röding (1767–1846) Germany
- Landon Timmonds Ross, Jr. (1942–) United States
- Gary Rosenberg (born 1959) United States
- Emil Adolf Rossmässler (1806–1867) Germany
- Miriam Rothschild (1908–2005) United Kingdom
- Jean Louis Florent Polydore Roux (1792–1833) France
- William B. Rudman (1944–) New Zealand
- John Ruskin (1819–1900) United Kingdom
- Vasily Ermolaevich Ruzhentsev (1899–1978) Russia

== S ==
- Georg Ossian Sars (1837–1927) Norway, marine and freshwater biologist
- Carl Ulisses von Salis-Marschlins (1762–1818) Switzerland
- Madoka Sasaki (1883–1927) Japan
- Thomas Say (1787–1834) United States
- Christoffer Schander (1960–2012) Sweden, Director of University Museum of Bergen, Norway
- Mattheus Marinus Schepman (1847–1919) Netherlands
- Franz Xaver Alfred Johann Schilder (1896–1970) Germany
- Menno Schilthuizen (1965–) Netherlands
- Otto Heinrich Schindewolf (1896–1971) Germany, evolution of cephalopods
- Johann Samuel Schröter (1735–1808) Germany
- Gustav Schwartz (1809–1890) Austria
- Heinrich Christian Friedrich Schumacher (1757–1830) Denmark
- Revett Sheppard (1778–1830) United Kingdom
- Bohumil Shimek (1861–1937) United States
- Robert James Shuttleworth (1810–1874) United Kingdom, Switzerland
- Charles Torrey Simpson (1846–1932) United States
- Heinrich Simroth (1851–1917) Germany
- Claude Sionnest (1749–1820) France
- Arthur Donaldson Smith (1864–1939) United Kingdom
- Charles Smith (topographer) (c. 1715–1762) Ireland
- Edgar Albert Smith (1847–1916) United Kingdom, zoologist
- Eugene Allen Smith (1841–1927) United States, malacologist
- Herbert Huntingdon Smith (1851–1919) United States
- James Edward Smith (1759–1828) United Kingdom
- Sidney Irving Smith (1843–1926) United States, brother-in-law of A. E. Verrill
- William Smith (1769–1839) United Kingdom
- William Walter Smith (1852–1942) New Zealand
- Alan Solem, full name George Alan Solem (1931–1990) United States, curator of invertebrates in Field Museum of Natural History, Chicago
- Árpád Soós (1912–1991) Hungary, son of Lajos Soós
- Louis François Auguste Souleyet (1811–1852) France
- George Brettingham Sowerby I (1788–1854) United Kingdom
- George Brettingham Sowerby II (1812–1884) United Kingdom
- George Brettingham Sowerby III (1843–1921) United Kingdom
- James Sowerby (1757–1822) United Kingdom
- Gerard Spaink (1928–2005) Netherlands
- Leonard Frank Spath (1882–1957) United Kingdom
- Lorenz Spengler (1720–1807) Denmark
- Yaroslav Igorevich Starobogatov (1932–2004) Russia
- Robert Edwards Carter Stearns (1827–1909) United States
- Edward Step (1855–1933) United Kingdom
- Victor Sterki (1846–1933) Switzerland
- William Stimpson (1832–1872) United States
- Charles Stokes (1780s–1853) United Kingdom
- Adolf Stossich (1824–1900) Italy
- Hermann Strebel (1834–1915) Germany, Mexico.
- Ellen E. Strong United States
- Samuel Emanuel Studer (1757–1834) Switzerland
- Rudolf Sturany (1867–1935) Austria, works
- Henry Suter (1841–1918) Switzerland, New Zealand
- William Swainson (1789–1855) United Kingdom
- Ernest Ruthven Sykes (1867–1954) United Kingdom

== T ==
- Iwao Taki (1901–1984) Japan
- Cesare Maria Tapparone-Canefri (1838–1891) Italy
- Dwight Willard Taylor (1932–2006) United States, also paleontologist, Hydrobiidae and Physidae
- Ange Paulin Terver (1798–1875) France
- Johannes Thiele (1860–1935) Germany
- William Theobald (1829–1908) United Kingdom
- Thomas Everett Thompson (1933–1990) England
- Donn Lloyd Tippett (1924–2014) American psychiatrist and malacologist, noted for his works on the family Turridae s.l.
- John Read le Brockton Tomlin (1864–1954) United Kingdom
- Franz Hermann Troschel (1810–1882) Germany
- George Washington Tryon (1838–1888) United States
- Hippolyt Tschapeck (1825–1897) Austria
- Stella Turk (1925–2017) United Kingdom
- Ruth Turner (full name Ruth Dixon Turner) (1915–2000) United States
- William Turton (1762–1835) United Kingdom, naturalist

== V ==
- Albert Jean Baptiste Marie Vayssière (1854–1942) France, malacologist and entomologist
- Michael Vecchione United States
- Bernard Verdcourt (1925–2011) United Kingdom
- Joseph Verco (1851–1933) Australia
- Geerat J. Vermeij (1946–) Netherlands
- Addison Emery Verrill (1839–1926) United States, zoologist, authority on the living cephalopods, especially the colossal squids of the North Atlantic
- Emily Hoskins Vokes American malacologist and paleontologist (1930– )
- Harold Vokes American malacologist (1908–1998)
- Gilbert L. Voss (1918–1989) United States

== W ==
- Erich Wagler (1884–1951) Germany
- Johann Andreas Wagner (1797–1861) Germany
- Rudolf Wagner (1805–1864) Germany
- Rudolf Graf Walderdorff (–1866) Austria
- Bryant Walker (1856–1936) United States
- Andrew Rodger Waterston (1912–1996) United Kingdom
- Peter Ward (1949-) United States
- Robert Boog Watson (1823–1910) Scotland
- William Henry Webster (1850–1931) Cheshire, United Kingdom; Waiuku, New Zealand
- Heinrich Conrad Weinkauff (1817–1886) Germany
- Wilhelm August Wenz (1886–1945) Germany
- Carl Agardh Westerlund (1831–1908) Sweden
- Albert G. Wetherby (1833-1902) United States
- Wolfgang Karl Weyrauch (1907–1970) South America, freshwater gastropods and land gastropods
- Gilbert Percy Whitley (1903–1975) United Kingdom, lived in Australia
- Nathan Vincent Whelan (1986-) United States
- Andrzej Wiktor (1931–2018) Poland
- Mary Alice Willcox (1856–1953) United States
- Thomas Vernon Wollaston (1822–1878) United Kingdom
- William Wood (1774–1857) United Kingdom
- Martha Burton Woodhead Williamson (1843–1922) United States
- Bernard Barham Woodward (1853–1930) United Kingdom

== See also ==
- List of biologists
- List of zoologists by author abbreviation
- Categorie:Mollusc taxa by author
