= Pešić =

Pešić (Cyrillic script: Пешић), also spelled Pesic, is a Serbian and Croatian surname. Notable persons with the surnam einclude:

- Aleksandar Pešić (born 1992), Serbian footballer
- Ante Pešić (born 1974), Croatian footballer
- Branko Pešić (1922–1986), Yugoslav politician
- Dejan Pešić (born 1976), Serbian goalkeeper
- Dragiša Pešić (1954–2016), Yugoslav politician
- Dušan Pešić (born 1955), Serbian footballer
- Ivan Pešić (footballer, born 1989), Serbian footballer
- Ivan Pešić (footballer, born 1992), Croatian footballer
- Ivan Pešić (handballer) (born 1989), Croatian handball goalkeeper
- Ivan Pesic (businessman), founder of Silvaco
- Iliya Pesic, former chairman of Silvaco, son of Ivan Pesic
- Kathy Pesic, chairman of Silvaco, widow of Ivan Pesic
- Marko Pešić, German basketballer
- Miroljub Pešić (born 1993), Serbian footballer
- Nikola Pešić (born 1973), artist born in Belgrade
- Svetislav Pešić (born 1949), Serbian basketball player and coach
- Vesna Pešić (born 1940), Serbian politician
- Vladimir Pešić, Montenegrin biologist
- Zoran Pešić (rugby league) (born 1983) Serbian rugby league footballer
- Zoran Pešić (footballer, born 1983) Serbian football player
- Zoran Pešić (footballer, born 1951) Serbian football player and manager
