= Cinema City (film festival) =

Film festival held in Novi Sad, Serbia

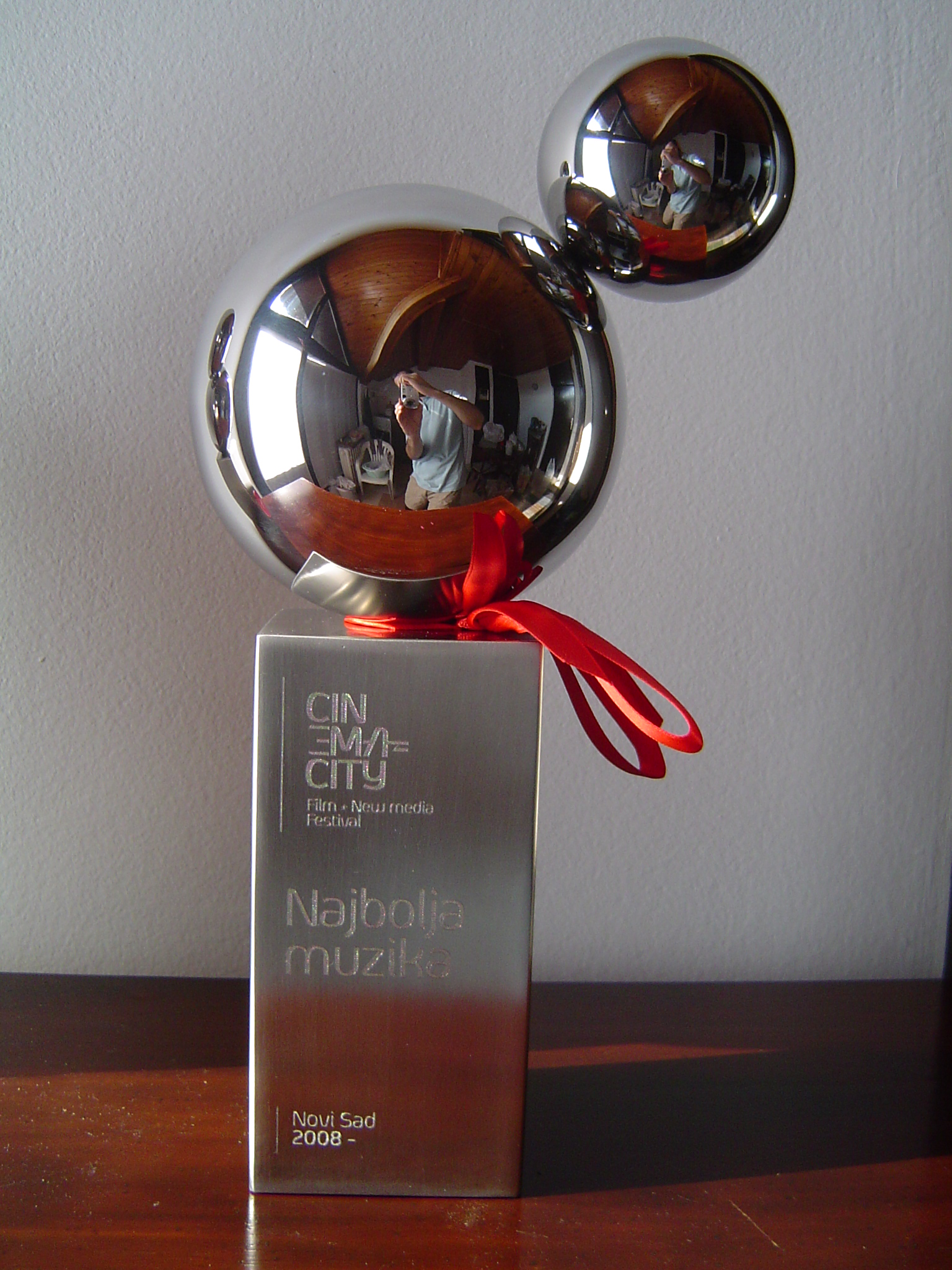
Ibis award, designed by Nikola Pešić

Cinema City is an international film festival held annually in Novi Sad, Serbia. During the eight days of the festival, Novi Sad becomes a festival city, with abundant film, music, and academic programmes. The programme concept consists of three segments: Cinema City Films, PRO, and Music, all of which are carried out across 10 city locations.

== Programme ==
The festival includes various components, including film, music, and academic programming, which take place at more than 10 locations in Novi Sad.

Cinema City Films is particularly focused on young film authors from the country, the region and the world. Competition selections include National Class, which screens best domestic achievements; Up to 10,000 bucks, which screens low-budget films from all over the globe; and Fresh Danube Films, which presents choice selection of best debut and second films signed by authors from the Danube region. The film program also includes review selections, which every year honor different domestic and foreign directors and cinemas, Planet Rock selection for screening the best music documentaries, 360° for presenting the latest achievements of international indie production, Cinema City Shorts, and special screenings. Films by program selections

PRO selection for the Cinema City festival is intended for film authors and professionals from the country and region. Its objective is to support education, networking and cooperation between the people who are the present and the future of domestic and regional cinema. This selection combines two parallel directions of film production in Serbia: domestic film production and foreign production service. The PRO selection is composed of Cinema City Campus– an educational program for young film authors and professionals from Serbia and the region, and Cinema City Industry – a platform for networking between professionals and for raising issues of special significance for domestic cinema.

Cinema City Music is the part of the festival that organizes opening and closing parties, concerts and accompanying music events during the festival, which has so far seen some of the most important domestic and foreign DJs and musicians. A special segment of the music program is PLANET ROCK FESTIVAL, which is a result of cooperation between the Cinema City Association and HNS Creative. Planet Rock is an interdisciplinary festival, which aims to integrate several segments of alternative culture. The vision of this project is to provide an original film and music platform in order to generate the framework for positioning Novi Sad as a new, creative entertainment center that stimulates alternative and progressive authors. Cinema City Music

== Competition ==
National class presents achievements of national cinematography and premieres. All the films from this selection are competing for Cinema City awards. The festival will be hosted to many domestic film authors and film crews.

Fresh Danube Films The main objective of Fresh Danube Films is to promote and support cultural diversity and creative synergy of cinematographies along Danube river. This program is a creative result of the last year project, which was supported by the European Cultural Foundation.

Up to 10,000 bucks encompasses films from around the world made with a budget of less than $10,000.

== History ==
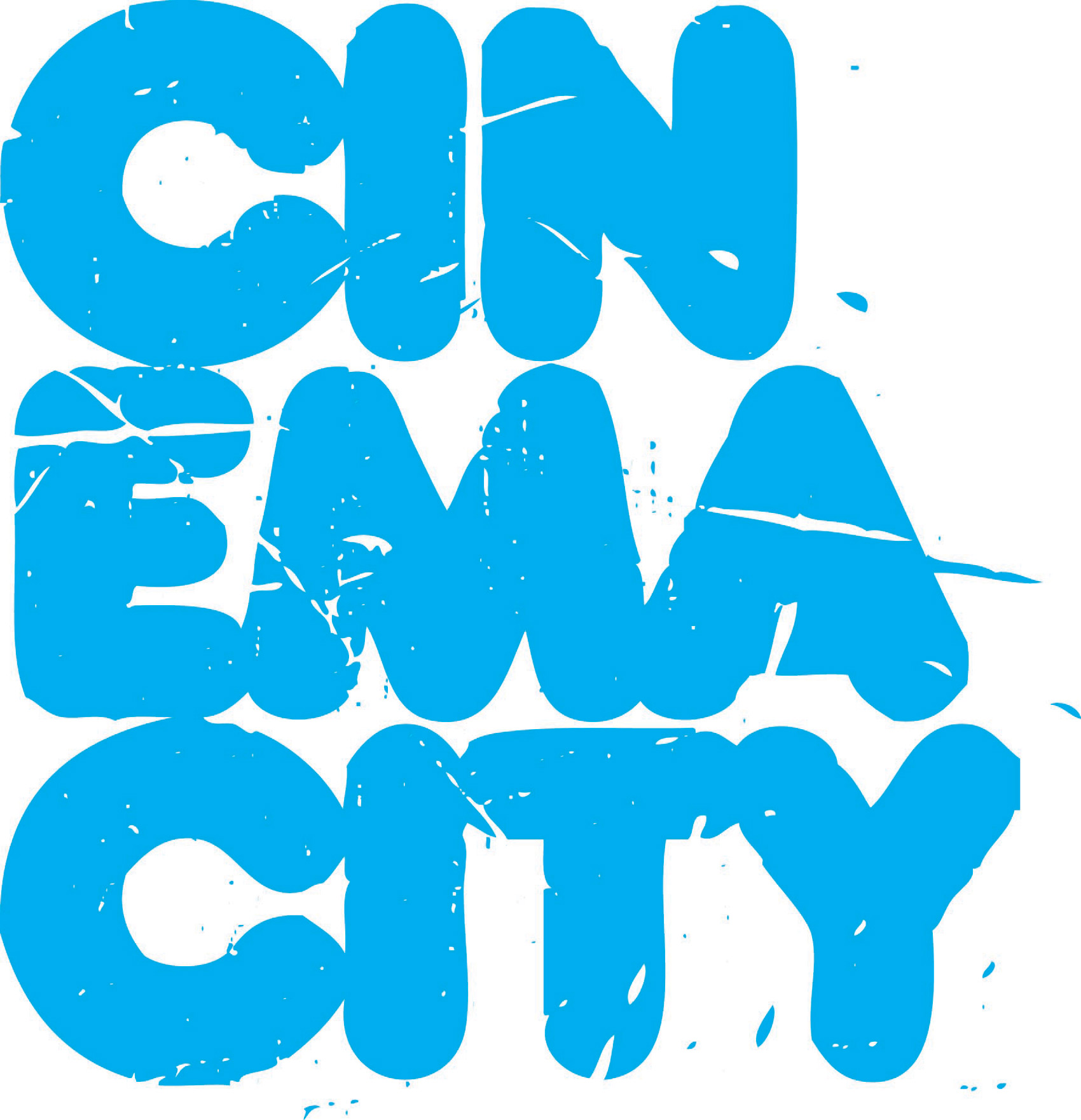
Official logo of the Cinema City International Film Festival

Since 2010, the Cinema City Festival has been organized independently by the Cinema City Association. The festival's Board of Directors and Council, as well as a number of associates and friends, work throughout the year to develop and organize the festival and other cultural projects. This festival is based on the concept of a festival city, which was introduced at the 2007 Serbian Film Festival. In 2008, Exit Association took over the festival's organization and made significant changes to the program concept. Cinema City grew into an international film festival in 2008 and 2009, and its scope, film program, and distinguished guests from all over the world make it an important cultural and film event for Serbia and the region. The Cinema City Association took over the organization of the Cinema City festival in 2010, and the festival is still being nurtured and developed in terms of concept and infrastructure.

== Guests ==
Guests of the festival in 2008 and 2009 were Guillermo Arriaga, who won the award for best screenplay at Cannes in 2005, winner of the Tribeca Film Festival in New York – Lance Hammer, the first Serbian winner at Sarajevo Film Festival – Vladimir Perišić, as well as domestic and regional film icons such as Miki Manojlović, Goran Paskaljević, Emir Kusturica, Pjer Žalica, Despina Mauzaki, and others. A special guest of the 2010 Festival was the famous American actress and singer – Juliette Lewis, who performed with her bend at Cinema City music opening on June 5, 2010. Over 80,000 people visited Cinema City, and clear skies, warm weather, and quality program certainly contributed to a great number of visitors at open-air cinemas, which are one of the strongest points of the Cinema City festival. The audience was also greatly interested in the guest appearance of the Iraqi director, Mohamed Al-Daradji. Cinema City 2011 presented some of the most significant contemporary authors from the world of independent film. Guests of the Festival, in whose honor Cinema City organized screenings of a number of retrospectives, were the Hungarian director Béla Tarr, Lithuanian author Šarūnas Bartas, and Polish director Dorota Kędzierzawska. Cinema City played host to the Board of the European Film Academy and numerous directors, producers, screenwriters, actors, and film professionals such Nick Powell, Bruno Chatelin, Laurence Herszberg, Andreas Dresen, and many film stars from Serbia and the region. Domestic film authors also caused great interest, as well as young film artists, the future of domestic cinematography. Official website

== Jury ==
- 2014:
1. The Jury National Class: Loïc Magneron, Raymond Phathanavirangoon, Peter Stumbur
2. The Jury Up to 10,0000 Bucks: Sarita Matijević, Nikola Majdak Jr., Dean Radovanović
3. The Jury Fresh Danube Films: David González
4. The MTV Jury: Aleksandar Ilić, Boris Miljković
5. The Jury FIPRESCI Serbia: Milan D. Špiček, Boris Gigov, Dejan Dabić
- 2013:
1. The Jury National Class: Katrin Gebbe, Marek Rozenbaum, Chad Chenouga
2. The Jury Up to 10,000 Bucks: Brankica Drašković, Vladimir Crnjanski, Uroš Tomić
- 2012:
1. The Jury National Class: Laurence Herszberg, Davide Manuli, Mary Nazari, Lorena Pavlič, Martin Schweighofer
2. The Jury Exit Point: Fridrik Thór Fridriksson, Simon Perry, Jean Roy, Mira Staleva, Will Tizard
3. The Jury Hungry Days: Will Tizard, João Pedro Rodrigues, Zvonimir Jurić, Santiago Fillol
4. The Jury Up to 10,000 Bucks: Rajko Petrović, Nevena Matović, Irena Škorić
- 2011:
1. The Jury Exit Point: Dorota Kędzierzawska, Sergey Lavrentiev, Ana Maria Rossi, Igor Sterk, Visar Vishka
2. The Jury National Class: Philippe Azoury, Sharunas Bartas, Jan Cvitkovič, Eva Hubert, Beki Probst
3. The Jury Up to 10,000 bucks: Nikola Ljuca, Vladimir Paskaljevic, Damir Todorovic
- 2010:
1. The Jury Exit Point: Canan Gerede, Guy Jacques, Ninos-Fenek Mikelidis, Steffen Wink, Kalina Kovacevic
2. The Jury National Class: Dejan Acimovic, Thure Munkholm, Kirill Razlogov, Jelka Stergel, Albert Wiederspiel
3. The Jury Up 10,000 bucks: Gauthier Morax, Ognjen Glavonic, Dunja Kusturica
- 2009:
1. The Jury Exit Point: Tuncel Kurtiz, Martin Blaney, Ivan Fila, Labina Mitevska, Ellis Driessen
2. The Jury National Class and Up to 10,000 bucks: Pjer Zalica, Ludovic Chavarot, Srdjan Koljevic, Iliana Kitanova, Padraic Delaney
3. The Jury FIPRESCI Serbia: Sandra Perovic, Vladimir Crnjanski, Stasa Jamusakov
- 2008:
1. The Jury Exit Point and National Class: Radan Popovic, Despina Mouzaki, Dom Rotheroe, Peter van Bueren, Thomas Poulard
2. The Jury Up to 10,000 bucks Jury: Igor M. Toholj, Marija Perovic, Sasa Radojevic

== Awards ==
Festival’s award Ibis, was named after a bird, whose habitat is in the Danube area not far from the festival’s base. According to folklore, Ibis is the last creature in the wild which looks for cover from bad weather, but is also the first to reappear after it, thus revealing itself as the messenger of beautiful weather. It is made by Serbian sculptor Nikola Pešić.

=== 2014 ===
- Grand Prix ("National class" program): "The Disobedient" by Mina Đukić
- Best directing ("National class" program): Mina Đukić "The Disobedient"
- Best actor ("National class" program): Muhamed Dupovac "So Hot Was the Cannon"
- Best actress ("National class" program): Hana Selimović "The Disobedient"
- Special Mentions ("National class" program): "Nymph" by Milan Todorović and "The Undertaker" by Dragan Nikolić
- Best film ("Up to 10,000 Bucks" program): "Stray Dogs" by Atanu Mukherjee
- Special Mentions ("Up to 10,000 Bucks" program): "Goran" by Roberto Santaguida and "Emergency Exit" by Vladimir Tagić
- Best film ("Fresh Danube Films" program): "Free Entry" by Yvonne Kerékgyártó
- THE SERBIAN FIPRESCI SECTION:
- Best film ("National class" program): "So Hot Was the Cannon" by Boban Skerlić
- Best film ("Fresh Danube Films" program): "Velvet Terrorists" by Pavol Pekarčík, Ivan Ostrochovský, and Peter Kerekes
- MTV AWARD:
- Best regional music video: Stefan Đorđević for his music video for "Wahine" by Threesome.

=== 2013 ===
- Grand Prix ("National class" program): "Circles" by Srdan Golubović
- Best directing ("National class" program): Bojan Vuk Kosovčević "Whirlpool"
- Best screenplay ("National class" program): Goran Marković and Tihomir Stanić "
- Best actor ("National class" program): Nebojša Glogovac for his roles in "CIRCLES" and "ARTILLERYMAN"
- Best actress ("National class" program): Dara Džokić "Whitering"
- Special Jury Prize went to Kosta Đorđević, director of "Trolling", actress Hristina Popović ("Circles"), actor Nikola Rakočević ("Circles", "Trolling") and students from the Faculty of Drama Arts in Belgrade, Aron Sekel, Raško Milatović, Miloš Milovanović, Nemanja Vojnović, Petar Ristovski, Tea Lukač, Marko Đorđević and Luka Popadić for the screenplay and direction of "WHERE IS NADIA?"
- Best film ("Up to 10,000 Bucks" program):"Either Words Nor Quiet" Dean Radovanović
- Special Jury Prize for animated film ("Up to 10,000 Bucks" program): "Comeback" Jelena Oroz
- Special Jury Prize to actors ("Up to 10,000 Bucks" program): Milica Trifunović and Mladen Sovilj "Real Good Paneling"
- Audience Award ("Exit Point" program): "A Letter to My Father" Damir Čučić

=== 2012 ===
- Grand Prix ("National class" program): "Clip" by Maja Milos
- Best directing ("National class" program): Miroslav Momčilović "Death of a Man in Balkans"
- Best screenplay ("National class" program): Miroslav Momčilović "Death of a Man in Balkans"
- Best actress ("National class" program): Nada Šargin "Practical Guide to Belgrade with Singing and Crying"
- Best actor ("National class" program): Emir Hadžihafizbegović "Death of a Man in Balkans"
- Special recognition goes to "Redemption Street" for superb cinematography
- Audience Award ("National class program"): "The Parade" by Srđan Dragojević
- Best film ("Exit Point" program): "Unfair World" by Filippos Tsitos
- Best film ("Hungry Days" program): "Neighbouring Sounds" by Kleber Mendoça Filho
- Best film ("Up to 10,000 Bucks" program): "Mirage" by Srđan Keča
- Best Serbian film ("Up to 10,000 Bucks" program):"The Other Shore" by Marko Đorđević
- Best Hungarian film ("Up to 10,000 Bucks" program): "Half Past Nine" by Anikó Urbán
- Special recognition for the best documentary goes to Polish film KAMP by Tomasz Jeziorski
- Special recognition for directing goes to the film "Stevan M. Živković" by Vladimir Tagić
- Special recognition for director of photography Ivan Marković in film "Fragments"
- Serbian branch of FIPRESCI international federation of film critics, with jury members: Ivana Kronja, Nenad Dukić, Dejan Petrović
- Presents Critics’ Prize to:
- Exit Point selection, Simon Kaijser da Silva for Stockholm East
- National Class selection, Bojan Vuletić for Practical Guide to Belgrade with Singing and Crying
- Serbian selection of international federation of film critics FIPRESCI with jury members: Milan D. Špiček, Boris Gigov and Vladimir Džudović
- Presents Critics’ Prize to:
- National Class selection: Death of a Man in Balkans, by Miroslav Momčilović
- Exit Point selection: Collaborator, by Martin Donovan

=== 2011 ===
- Grand Prix ("National class" program): "Tilva Ros" by Nikola Lezaic
- Best directing ("National class" program): Oleg Novkovic "White White World"
- Best screenplay ("National class" program): Nikola Lezaic "Tilva Ros"
- Best actor ("National class" program): Nikola Rakocevic "Skinning"
- Best actress ("National class" program): Jasna Djuricic "White White World"
- Best photography ("National class" program): Dusan Joksimovic "The Enemy"
- Best editing ("National class" program): Aleksandra Milovanovic "Cinema Komunisto"
- Best original score ("National class" program): Boris Kovac "White White World"
- Best scenography ("National class" program): Zorana Petrov "The Enemy"
- Best costume ("National class" program): Lana Pavlovic "The Enemy"
- Special award ("National class" program): omnibus "October"
- Best film ("Exit Point" program): "Kawasaki's Rose" by Jan Hrebejk
- Best directing ("Exit Point" program): Bogdan George Apetri "Outbound"
- Best actor ("Exit Point" program): Brian Brown "Limbo"
- Best actress ("Exit Point" program): Ana Ularu "Outbound"
- Special award ("Exit Point" program): "Cerro Bayo" by Victoria Galardi
- Best film ("Up to 10,000 bucks" program): "March 9th" by Irena Skoric
- Special recognition for the best acting performance ("Up to 10,000 bucks" program): Visnja Obradovic "Golden League"
- Special recognition for socially significant documentary ("Up 10,000 bucks" program): "Trials, Tribulations & Sustainable Growth of a Cock" by Vladimir Perovic
- Special recognition for a funny and provocative documentary ("Up to 10,000 bucks" program): "Reality, fuck off" by Nemanja Vojinović
- Honorary Award for his outstanding achievement as actor: Bata Živojinović
- Audience Award: "Cinema Komunisto" by Mila Turajlic
- FIPRESCI jury awards:
- the best feature ("Exit Point" program): "Tamara Drewe" by Stephen Frears
- the best film ("National class" program): "How I Was Stolen by the Germans" by Miša Radivojević
- FEDEORA jury awards:
- film "The Enemy" by Dejan Zecevic ("National class" program)
- film "Mothers" by Milcho Manchevski ("Balkan Box" program)
- The Serbian branch of FIPRESCI awards:
- film "The Show Must Go On" by Nevio Marasovic
- special mention "Abandoned" by Adis Bakrac

=== 2010 ===
- Grand Prix ("Exit Point" program): "Winter’s Bone" directed by Debra Granik
- Best directing ("Exit Point" program): Chuan Lu "City of Life and Death"
- Best actor ("Exit Point" program): Emir Kusturica "Farewell"
- Best actress ("Exit Point" program): Lola Duenas "Me Too"
- Special recognition ("Exit Point program"): Mohamed Al-Daradji "Son of Babylon"
- Best film ("National class" program): "The Woman with a Broken Nose" by Srdjan Koljevic
- Best directing ("National class" program): Sasa Hajdukovic, "32nd of December"
- Best screenplay ("National class" program): Srdjan Koljevic, "The Woman with a Broken Nose"
- Best actor ("National Class" program): Nebojsa Glogovac, "The Woman with a Broken Nose"
- Best actress ("National Class" program): Nikolina Djorodjevic, "32nd of December"
- Special recognition for artistic contribution: Vlastimir Velisavljevic, "Devil's Town"
- Best film ("Up to 10,000 bucks" program): "Thursday" by Nikola Ljuca
- Special recognition for directing ("Up to 10,000 bucks" program): Dane Komljen, "I already am everything I want to have"
- Special recognition for original approach ("Up to 10,000 bucks" program): Louise BotkayCourcier, "Useless Landscape"
- Special recognition for a promising director ("Up to 10,000 bucks" program): Zoran Tairovic, "Little Red Riding Hood"
- Audience award for best film: "The Woman with a Broken Nose" by Srdjan Koljevic

=== 2009 ===
- Best film ("National class" program): "Obični ljudi" by Vladimir Perišić
- Directing ("National class" program): Srđan Dragojević "Sveti Georgije ubiva aždahu"
- Script ("National class" program): Miroslav Momčilović "Čekaj me, ja sigurno neću doći"
- Editing ("National class" program): Petar Marković "Sveti Georgije ubiva aždahu"
- Cinematography ("National class" program): Aleksandar Ramadanović "Jesen u mojoj ulici"
- Leading male performance ("National class" program): Lazar Ristovski "Sveti Georgije ubiva aždahu"
- Leading female performance ("National class" program): Mirjana Karanović "Tamo i ovde"
- Special prize ("National class" program): „Jesen u mojoj ulici“ by Miloš Pušić
- Up to 10.000 Bucks category: "Živan Pujić Jimmy" by Ognjen Glavonić
- "Exit Point" program Grand Prix: "Toni Manero" directed by Pablo Lareno
- Audience award for best film: "Technotise: Edit & I" by Aleksa Gajić
- Special contribution to Serbian cinematography: "Technotise: Edit & I" by Aleksa Gajić

=== 2008 ===
- Grand prix of the festival: "Ballast" (director: Lance Hammer)
- Best film (Serbian film): "Ljubav i drugi zločini" Stefan Arsenijević
- Directing (Serbian film): Dejan Zečević "Četvrti čovek"
- Script (Serbian film): Nebojša Romčević "Na lepom plavom Dunavu"
- Editing (Serbian film): Marko Glušac "Četvrti čovek"
- Cinematography (Serbian film): Miloš Kodemo "Miloš Branković"
- Original music (Serbian film): Boris Kovač "Na lepom plavom Dunavu"
- Leading male performance (Serbian film): Nikola Kojo "Četvrti čovek"
- Leading female performance (Serbian film): Ana Franić "Na lepom plavom Duvanu"
- Up to 10.000 Bucks category: "Uspavanka za dečaka" by Miloš Pušić
- Special contribution to contemporary film expression: "The Amazing Truth About Qeen Raquela" by Olaf de Fleur Johannesson

=== 2007 ===
Official logo of the first edition of Cinema City

- Best movie - Grand prix: "Bel epok" (director: Nikola Stojanović)
- Best directing: Sabolč Tolnai
- Script: Uglješa Šajtinac/ Dejan Nikolaj Kraljačić
- Cinematography: Milad Tauk
- Original music: Arsen Dedić
- Leading male performance: Kenedi Hasani
- Leading female performance: Vita Mavrič
- Supporting male performance: Petar Božović
- Supporting female performance: Milena Vasić Ražnatović
- Editing: Aleksandar Rajković
- Sound design: Lukas Grgozevski
- Scene design: Miodrag Nikolić
- Costume design: Jelena Petrović
- Make- up: Milena Stefanović/ Tamara Spasojević
- Best movie - Eurimages programme: "Trans" by Tereze Vilaverde

== See also ==
- List of film festivals in Europe
- List of Serbian films
