= José H. Leal =

Brazilian malacologist

- Born: Rio de Janeiro
- Education: Bachelor's and master's degrees from Federal University of Rio de Janeiro, Brazil; PhD from University of Miami
- Scientific career
- Fields: Malacology, Zoology, Marine Biology, Marine Conservation, Marine Biodiversity
- Workplaces: Bailey-Matthews National Shell Museum, 1996 to present, visiting professor at Muséum National d'Histoire Naturelle, Paris, postdoc at Smithsonian Institution's National Museum of Natural History, Washington, USA

José H. Leal is a Brazilian-born malacologist and American citizen residing in the United States since 1984. Between 1996 and 2013 he was the executive director of the Bailey-Matthews National Shell Museum, in Sanibel Island, Florida, and he is currently the science director and curator of that museum.

Dr. Leal received his Ph.D. in marine biology and fisheries from the Rosenstiel School of Marine and Atmospheric Science, University of Miami. He was an assistant editor for Sea Frontiers Magazine, (Miami), a visiting professor at the Muséum National d'Histoire Naturelle (Paris), and postdoctoral fellow at the Smithsonian Institution's National Museum of Natural History (Washington, DC).

Dr. Leal holds honorary faculty positions at the University of Miami and Florida Gulf Coast University (Fort Myers), where he is an affiliate member of the Coastal Watershed Institute. He has numerous scientific publications, and is also the editor of the malacological journal The Nautilus. He has been president of the American Malacological Society and of Conchologists of America and a council member of Unitas Malacologica. In 2023, Dr. Leal received the prestigious Neptunea Award from Conchologists of America, for his services to the global community of shell enthusiasts.

== Taxa ==
Taxa named in honor of José H. Leal include:

- Dermomurex leali Houart, 1991
- Tritonoharpa leali Harasewych, Petit, & Verhecken, 1992
- Epitonium leali Garcia, 2011
- Chicoreus leali Thach, 2016
- Cucullaea leali Thach, 2023
- Nanuca leali Henryco, Meirelles, García-Mendez, Camacho-García, Valdés, Schrödl, & Padula, 2025
