= Kamitakatsu Shell Mound =

Shell midden in Tsuchiura, Kantō, Japan

Kamitakatsu Shell Midden
- 上高津貝塚 (Japanese)
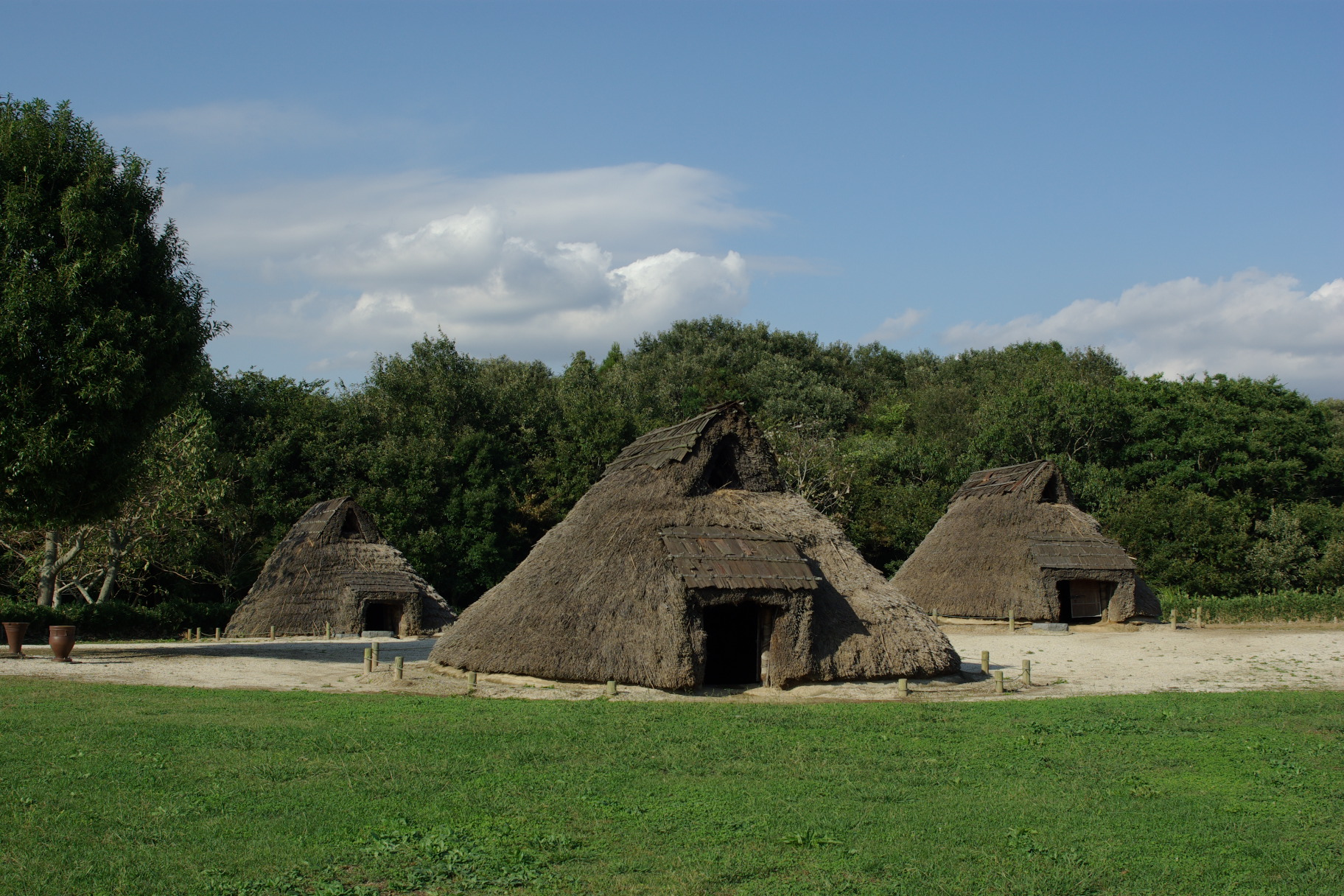
- Kamitakatsu Shell Midden

- Kamitakatsu Shell Midden Kamitakatsu Shell Mound (Japan)
- 36°04′37″N 140°09′58″E
- Type: shell midden
- Periods: late Jōmon period
- Location: Tsuchiura, Ibaraki, Japan
- Region: Kantō region

Site notes
- Area: 44,048 m^{2} (474,130 sq ft)
- Excavation dates: 1900, 1930, 1950, 1958, 1959
- Public access: Yes (park and museum)

The Kamitakatsu Shell Midden (上高津貝塚, Kamitakatsu kaizuka) is an archaeological site in the Shishitsuka, Kamitakatsu, and Nakatakatsu neighborhoods of the city of Tsuchiura, Ibaraki Prefecture, in the northern Kantō region of Japan containing a late Jōmon period shell midden. The site was designated a National Historic Site in 1977.

== Overview ==
During the early to middle Jōmon period (approximately 4000 to 2500 BC), sea levels were five to six meters higher than at present, and the ambient temperature was also 2 deg C higher. During this period, the Kantō region was inhabited by the Jōmon people, many of whom lived in coastal settlements. The middens associated with such settlements contain bone, botanical material, mollusc shells, sherds, lithics, and other artifacts and ecofacts associated with the now-vanished inhabitants, and these features, provide a useful source into the diets and habits of Jōmon society. Most of these middens are found along the Pacific coast of Japan.

The Kamitakatsu Shell Midden is located on the edge of the hill on the right bank of the Sakura River, which flows into the innermost part of Nishiura in Lake Kasumigaura, on the western outskirts of Tsuchiura City. The site has five shell mounds distributed across a flat surface forming a shell ring with a diameter of about 150 meters. In 1900, the first academic report on the site was published, but artifacts from the first archaeological excavation made in 1933 (which also revealed the site of the Jōmon period settlement) were lost in World War II. New excavations were carried out in 1950, 1958, and 1959, and a large number of artifacts were uncovered. In addition to the expected shells of various species, stone axes, stone jewelry, stone rods, stone tools, bone needles, bone horn ornaments, clay figurines, and earthen plates were excavated. The shell layer is 1 to 1.5 meters thick and consists of both freshwater and seawater clams, with Yamato-shijimi clams predominating. By measuring the growth ring of the shells, it was found that about 70% of the shells were collected intensively from early spring to early summer, leading to the hypothesis that a large number were processed as dried seafood, either for storage or as a trade good for inland settlements.

The site is open to the public as the Kamikotsu Kaizuka Hometown History Plaza (上高津貝塚ふるさと歴史の広場, Kamitakatsu Kaizuka furusato rekishi no hiroba) with a museum and reconstructions of pit dwellings. The site is located at "Tsuchiura Yōgogakkōmae" bus stop on the Kanto Railway bus from Tsuchiura Station on the JR East Joban Line.

== See also ==
- List of Historic Sites of Japan (Ibaraki)
