= The Nautilus (journal) =

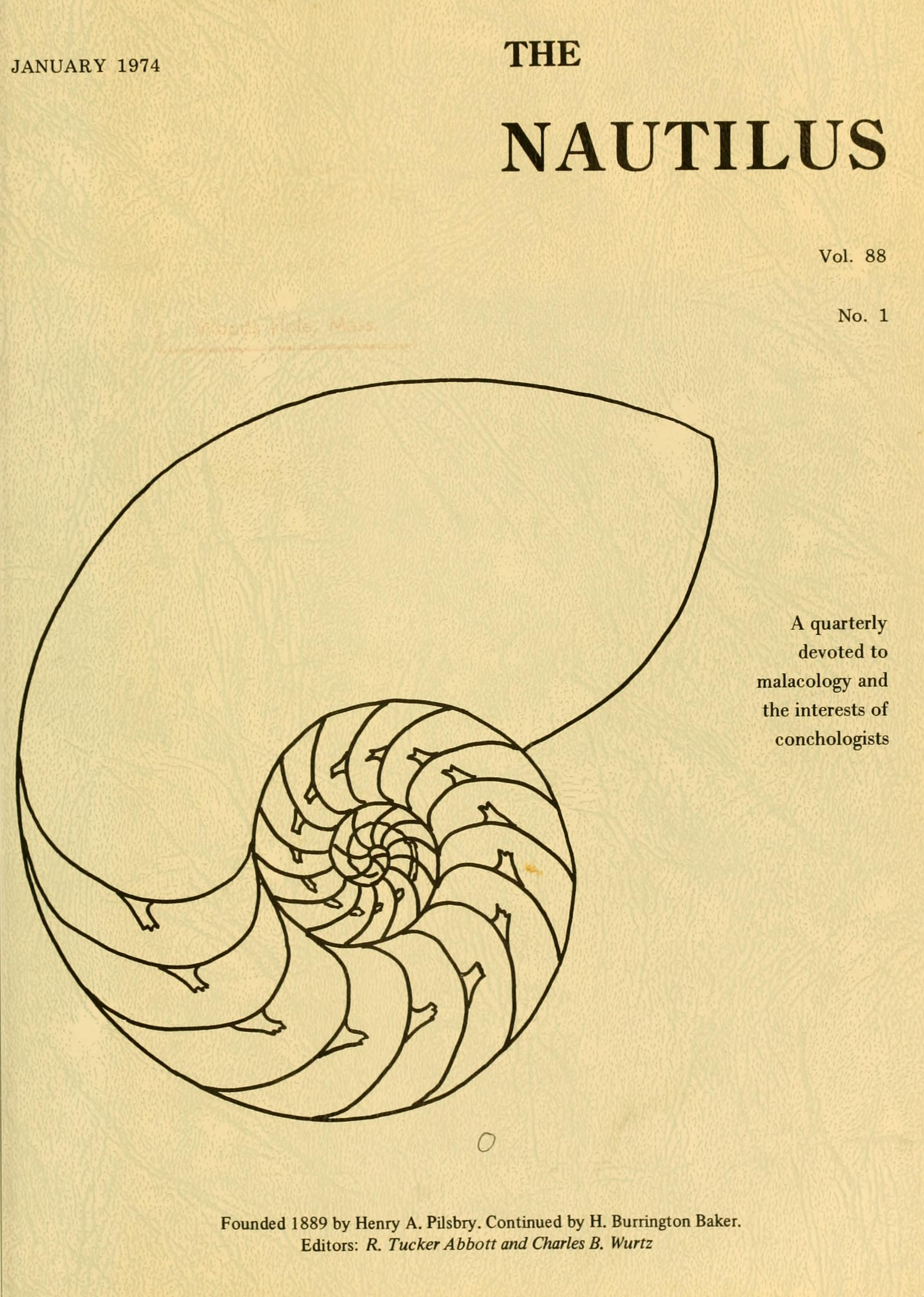
- Journal cover of The Nautilus 88(1). This design was used from 1972 to 1986.
- Discipline: Malacology
- Language: English
- Edited by: José H. Leal

Publication details
- Former name: The Conchologists’ Exchange
- History: 1886-present
- Publisher: Bailey-Matthews Shell Museum (United States)
- Frequency: Quarterly
- Open access: After 3-6 years
- License: 1886-1983 97(1-2) public domain
- Impact factor: 1.000 (2019)

Standard abbreviations
- ISO 4: Nautilus

Indexing
- CODEN: NUTLA5
- ISSN: 0028-1344
- LCCN: sf80000648
- OCLC no.: 1759527

Links
- Journal homepage; Online access of older volumes at Biodiversity Heritage Library

The Nautilus is a peer-reviewed scientific journal covering research in malacology. Hence its scope includes all aspects of the biology, ecology, and systematics of mollusks.

The first two volumes were published by shell trader William D. Averell (1853-1928) under the name The Conchologists’ Exchange. From 1958 to 1972, the subtitle of The Nautilus was "The Pilsbry Quarterly devoted to the Interests of Conchologists".

Since 1999, its publication is partly sponsored by Florida's Division of Cultural Affairs and the National Endowment for the Arts since 2002.

== Abstracting and indexing ==
The journal is abstracted and indexed by Aquatic Sciences and Fisheries Abstracts, Biological Abstracts, BIOSIS Previews, Current Contents, Science Citation Index, and The Zoological Record. According to the Journal Citation Reports, its 2019 impact factor is 1.00.

== Name ==
The name of the journal is taken from the common name and scientific name of the shelled cephalopod, the nautilus.

== Editors ==
Editors of The Nautilus have included notable malacologists:

- William D. Averell (1853–1928), editor and business manager (1886–1889)
- Charles Willison Johnson (1863–1932), business manager (1890–1932)
- Henry Augustus Pilsbry (1862–1957), editor (1889–1957)
- Horace Burrington Baker (1889–1971), editor (1958–1968), business manager since 1932
- Charles B. Wurtz (1916–1982), editor since 1958
- Robert Tucker Abbott (1919–1995), editor (1968–1995)
- Myroslaw George Harasewych (born 1949), editor (1985–1998)
- José H. Leal (born 1952), managing editor (1997), editor (1998–present)
