= Shijimi =

Shijimi can refer to:

- 29431 Shijimi, an asteroid
- Shijimi (clam), Corbicula japonica, a shellfish used in Japanese cuisine
