= Ida Shepard Oldroyd =

American conchologist, curator, and paleontologist (1856–1940)

- Born: Ida Mary Shepard; November 25, 1856; Goshen, Indiana, U.S.
- Died: July 9, 1940 (aged 83); Palo Alto, California, U.S.
- Education: University of Michigan
- Known for: Marine Shells of Puget Sound and Vicinity (1924); The Marine Shells of the West Coast of North America (1924–27)
- Spouse: Tom Shaw Oldroyd
- Scientific career
- Fields: Malacology, Conchology
- Workplaces: Stanford University

Ida Shepard Oldroyd (1856–1940) was an American conchologist and Curator of Geology at Stanford University for over 20 years, who curated what was for a time the second-largest collection of mollusk shells in the world. Oldroyd and her husband, Tom Shaw Oldroyd, amassed one of the largest private shell collections in California. Ida was recognized as an active and early pioneer of conchology in the western United States. She was a charter member of the American Malacological Union, of which she served as vice-president in 1934 and as honorary president from 1935 to 1940.

== Early life ==
Ida Mary Shepard was born on November 25, 1856, in Goshen, Indiana, to parents William H. and Delia Mary (Gillett) Shepard. She attended high school in Saline, Michigan, and attended the University of Michigan from 1883 to 1885, earning a teaching certificate but not graduating. In 1888, her family moved to Long Beach, California, where she began collecting shells. In September, 1895, she married Tom Shaw Oldroyd, a fellow shell collector. The two collected extensively in southern California, amassing a large collection and obtaining rare specimens brought in on the nets of fishermen.

== Career ==
In 1914, Oldroyd was recruited by the California Academy of Sciences to classify and pack a portion of the shell collection of Henry Hemphill, in preparation of the collection's transfer to the Academy following Hemphill's death. In 1916, she was hired by Stanford University, which had then acquired the Hemphill collection, to catalog the collection. A year later, Stanford purchased the Oldroyds' private collection and hired the Oldroyds as curators in the Department of Geology, where they served for the rest of their lives. In the mid-1920s, the Stanford shell collection was the second largest in the world. They continued to collect shells in California and Washington state, and in 1929–30 traveled the world, collecting and facilitating the acquisition of large collections upon their return.

In 1922, Oldroyd was hired as a consultant by the American Museum of Natural History in New York City, where she spent several months studying and organizing the conchology collection. Oldroyd produced several papers, and is known for her major works: Marine Shells of Puget Sound and Vicinity (1924) and The Marine Shells of the West Coast of North America, a four-volume series published between 1924 and 1927. Oldroyd was a charter member of the American Malacological Union and served as its vice-president in 1934 and as honorary president from 1935 to 1940.

== Death and legacy ==
Oldroyd died on July 9, 1940, in Palo Alto, California, at the age of 83 after several months of declining health. At the time of her death, the Stanford shell collection was considered the largest of any American university. Oldroyd described over 20 species of mollusk as well as a species of coral. She is commemorated in the names of several mollusk species, including Tellina idae Dall, 1891; Mitra idae Melvill, 1893; Odostomia (Chrysallida) oldroydi Dall & Bartsch, 1909; Alvania oldroydae Bartsch, 1911; Bittium oldroydae Bartsch, 1911; and Melanella oldroydae Bartsch, 1917, as well as the coral Dendrophyllia oldroydae.

== Husband ==
Tom Shaw Oldroyd was born in Huddersfield, England, on June 13, 1853, and his family moved to Flushing, New York, in 1855. In 1880 he moved to California, settling in Long Beach where he began collecting shells. Tom specialized in fossil shells of the Pleistocene. He died of heart trouble on November 3, 1932, at the age of 80. He is commemorated in the names of around 10 species.
