= Calamaria forcarti =

Conservation status
- Data Deficient (IUCN 3.1)

Scientific classification
- Kingdom: Animalia
- Phylum: Chordata
- Class: Reptilia
- Order: Squamata
- Suborder: Serpentes
- Family: Colubridae
- Genus: Calamaria
- Species: C. forcarti

Binomial name
- Calamaria forcarti Inger & Marx, 1965
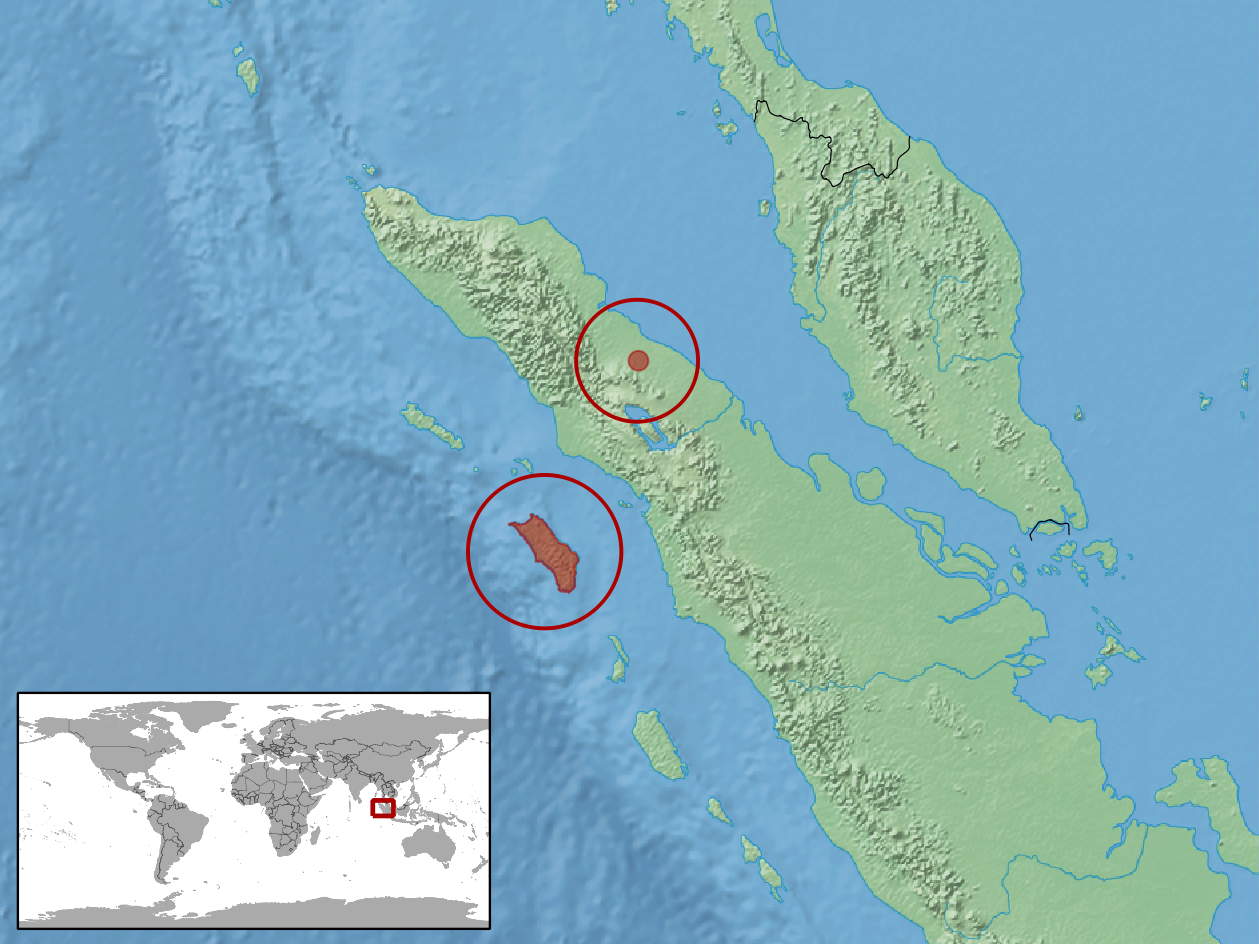

Synonyms
- Clamaria stahlknechti Roux, 1925 (non Stoliczka)

Species of snake

Calamaria forcarti, also known commonly as Forcart's reed snake, is a species of snake in the subfamily Calamariinae of the family Colubridae. The species is native to Indonesia.

== Etymology ==
The specific name, forcarti, is in honor of Lothar Forcart (1902–1990), a Swiss zoologist who specialized in malacology and herpetology.

== Description ==
Calamaria forcarti exhibits the following diagnostic characters. The mental is in contact with the anterior chin shields. A preocular is present. The third and fourth upper labials are in contact with the eye. Males have more than 175 ventrals, females more than 190. Dorsally, it is brown, without stripes. Ventrally, it is yellow.

== Geographic distribution ==
In Indonesia Calamaria forcarti is found in the province of North Sumatra, including the island of Nias.

== Habitat ==
The preferred natural habitat of Calamaria forcarti is forest at elevations below 100 m (330 ft).

== Behavior ==
Calamaria forcarti is terrestrial, living in the leaf litter on the forest floor.

== Reproduction ==
Calamaria forcarti is oviparous.
