= Michele Stossich =

Michele Stossich (10 August 1857 – 7 February 1906) was an Austro-Hungarian zoologist and helminthologist born in Trieste. He was the son of biologist Adolf Stossich (1824-1900).

Stossich studied at the University of Innsbruck and Vienna Polytechnic, earning his teaching certificate in 1878. Afterwards, he was an instructor in Fiume (1878-1882) and Trieste.

In 1902 he described Cyclocoelidae, a family of parasitic flatworms. During his career he classified a number of helminthological species, and has several zoological species named after him.

He was a member of the Società adriatica di scienze naturali (Adriatic Society of Natural Sciences), the Società agraria di Trieste (Agricultural Society of Trieste) and a corresponding member of the Museum of Rovereto and the Royal Academy of Sciences Modena.

He published numerous scientific articles in various periodicals, many of them located in the acts of the Adriatic Society of Natural Sciences, Trieste. The following are a few of his principal publications:

- I distomi dei pesci marini e d'acqua dolce, 1886.
- I distomi dei mammiferi, 1892.
- Saggio di una fauna elmintologica di Trieste e provincie contermini, 1898.
