= Edward Step =

British naturalist

Edward Step FLS (11 November 1855 – 1931) was the author of many popular and specialist books on various aspects of nature. His many works on botany, zoology and mycology were published between 1894 and (posthumously) 1941. Some of his books on flowers were illustrated by his daughter, Mabel Emily Step, including the 1905 pocket guide entitled Wayside and Woodland Blossoms. He also contributed to the periodical Science-Gossip: An Illustrated Monthly Record of Nature, Country Lore & Applied Science.

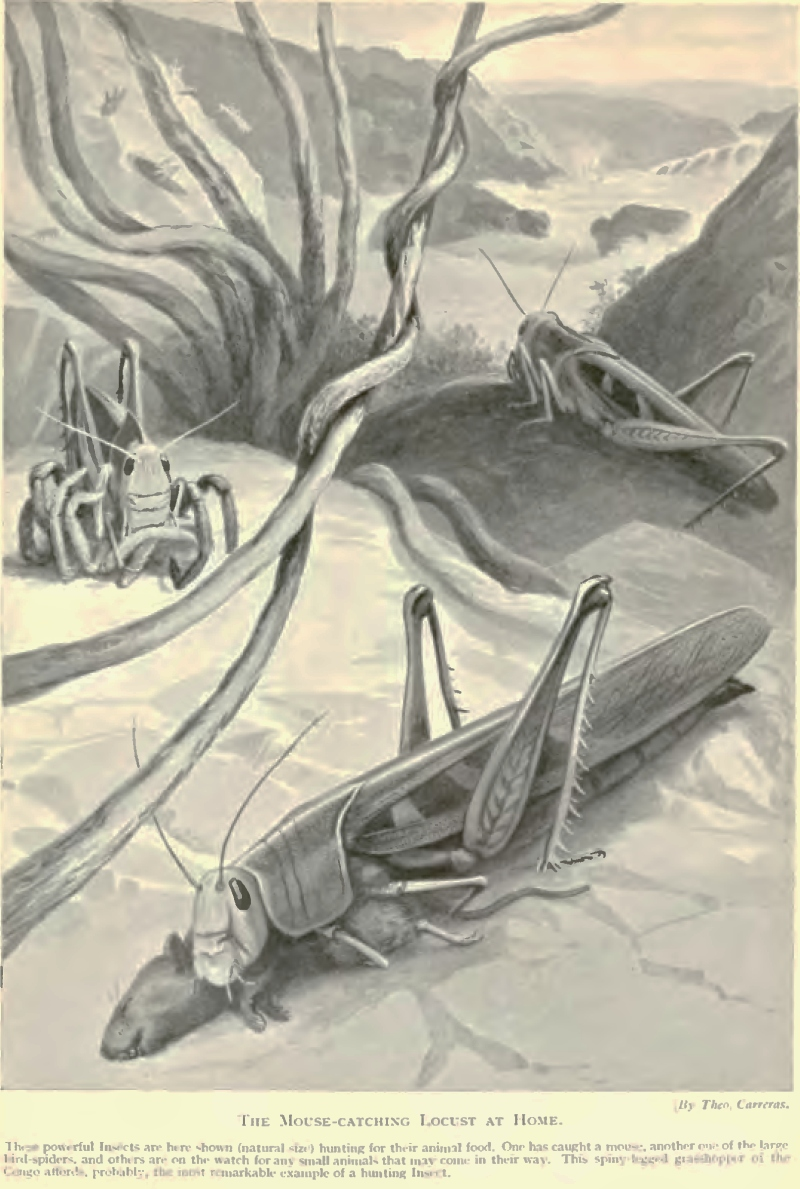
An inaccurate image showing a grasshopper feeding on a mouse

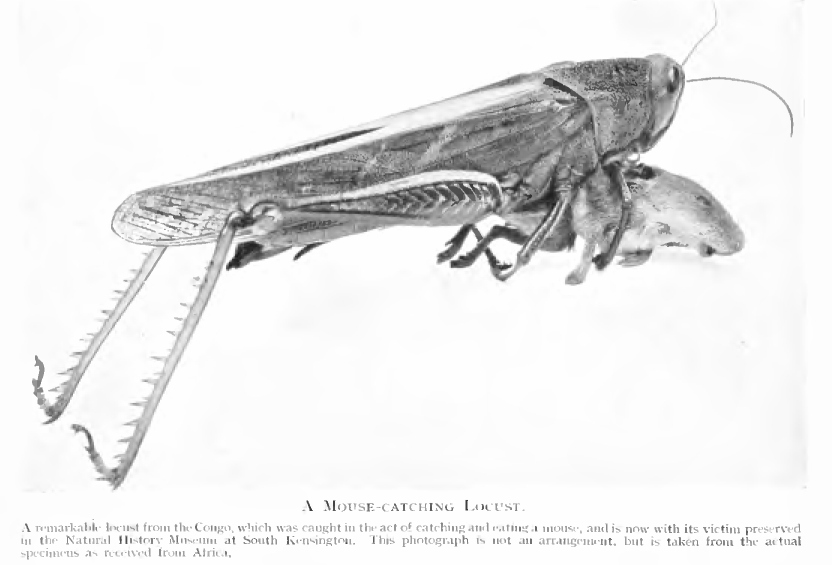
Another view

== Children's Encyclopædia ==
When Arthur Mee produced the first edition of his famous Children's Encyclopædia – initially as a fortnightly series from 1908 until 1910 – Edward Step agreed to contribute the articles on plant life. There were numerous illustrations to these, but they consisted of monochrome photographs attributed to Edward Connold.

== Locust myth ==
Step created a myth of a mouse-eating grasshopper in his book 'Marvels of Insect Life (1915), where he wrote, "In the British Museum (Natural History) there is a specimen of one of the largest known locusts, which was received from a missionary in the Congo Free State a few years ago, who had taken it in the act of feasting upon a mouse it had caught.... The locust in question does not confine its attention to mice; large spiders, beetles and other insects, and probably small nestling birds serve it equally for food." In fact no grasshopper is known to feed on mice.

Step's views on evolution are not obvious from his books. At one point he referred to "the wonders of Creation". However, he wrote a chapter in the same book on the giant tortoise of the Galapagos Islands that included a reference to Charles Darwin, but without a mention of evolution. Religious examples are frequent in his books, for example, quoting Beecher's "Of all man's works of art, a cathedral is greatest; a vast and majestic tree is greater than that", and again, "Thousands see in cathedral aisles the reproduction in stone of the pine-forest or the beech-wood."

== Bibliography ==
This list of publications by Step and his co-authors is arranged in chronological order by the dates of the first editions of each work. It does not include the many revisions of his books that appeared into the 1960s.

- Step E. (1894) By Vocal Woods and Waters: Studies from Nature, Bliss, Sands and Foster, London: 254 pp.
- Step E. (1896) Favourite Flowers of the Garden and Greenhouse, (4 volumes) S.W. Partridge & Co. Ltd., London
- Step E. (1896) By the Deep Sea: A Popular Introduction to the Wild Life of the British Shores, Jarrold & Sons Ltd., London: 322 pp.
- Step E. (1899) Wayside and Woodland Blossoms: A Pocket Guide to British Wild-Flowers for the Country Rambler, (Illustrator: M.E. Step) Frederick Warne & Co. Ltd., London & NY: 172 pp.
- Cundall J. & Step E. (1898) The Everyday Book of Natural History, Jarrold & Sons Ltd., London: 485 pp.
- Step E. (1899) By Sea-Shore, Wood and Moorland: Peeps at Nature, S.W. Partridge & Co. Ltd., London: 320 pp.
- Pratt A. & Step E. (1899) Flowering Plants, Grasses, Sedges & Ferns of Great Britain and Their Allies the Club Mosses, Horsetails, &c., (4 volumes) Frederick Warne & Co. Ltd., London & NY
- Step E. (1901) The Romance of Wild Flowers: A Companion to the British Flora, Frederick Warne & Co. Ltd., London & NY: 357 pp.
- Step E. (1901) Shell Life: An Introduction to the British Mollusca, Frederick Warne & Co. Ltd., London & NY: 414 pp.
- Step E. (1902) The Little Folks Picture Natural History, Frederick Warne & Co. Ltd., London & NY: 64 pp.
- Step E. (1903) The Harvest of the Woods: Autumnal Gleanings, Jarrold & Sons Ltd., London: 191 pp.
- Step E. (1903) Wayside and Woodland Trees: A Pocket Guide to the British Sylva, Frederick Warne & Co. Ltd., London & NY: 308 pp.
- Step E. (1905) Wayside and Woodland Blossoms, (3 volumes; illustrator: M.E. Step) Frederick Warne & Co. Ltd., London & NY
- Step E. (1905) Wild Flowers Month by Month in their Natural Haunts, (2 volumes) Frederick Warne & Co. Ltd., London & NY: 400 pp.
- Step E. (1908) Wayside and Woodland Ferns: A Guide to the British Ferns, Horsetails, and Club-Mosses, Frederick Warne & Co. Ltd., London & NY: 144 pp.
- Step E. (1910) Nature in the Garden, (2 volumes) Frederick Warne & Co. Ltd., London & NY
- Step E. (1913) Messmates: A Book of Strange Companionships in Nature, Hutchinson & Co. Ltd., London: 220 pp.
- Step E. (1913) Toadstools and Mushrooms of the Countryside: A Pocket Guide to the Larger Fungi, Frederick A. Stokes Co.; also Hutchinson & Co., London: 143 pp.
- Knight A.E. & Step E. (1913) Popular Botany: The Living Plant from Seed to Fruit, (2 volumes) Henry Holt & Co. Inc., New York
- Step E. (1915) Marvels of Insect Life: A Popular Account of Structure and Habit, Hutchinson & Co.; US edition by Robert M. McBride and Co., NY; 1935 edition by Frederick Warne & Co. Ltd., London & NY: 520 pp.
- Step E. (1919) Insect Artizans and Their Work, Hutchinson & Co.; later editions by Frederick Warne & Co. Ltd., London & NY: 318 pp.
- Step E. (1921) Animal Life of the British Isles: A Pocket Guide to the Mammals, Reptiles and Batrachians of Wayside and Woodland, (illustrator: W.J. Stokoe) Frederick Warne & Co. Ltd., London & NY: 184 pp.
- Bather F.A., Boulenger E.G., Step E. et al. (1923–24) Hutchinson's Animals of all Countries: The Living Animals of the World in Picture and Story, (Published in 50 parts) Hutchinson & Co. Ltd., London
- Step E. (1924) Go To the Ant: A Popular Account of the Natural History Ants in all Countries, Hutchinson & Co. Ltd., London: 234 pp.
- Step E. (1924) Hutchinson's Trees and Flowers of the Countryside, (2 volumes) Hutchinson & Co. Ltd., London
- Knight A.E. & Step E. (1925) Hutchinson's Popular Botany: the living plant from seed to fruit; the fascinating story of the world's plants told in a popular manner, (2 volumes) Hutchinson & Co. Ltd., London
- Step E. (1926) Herbs of Healing: A Book of British Simples, Hutchinson & Co. Ltd., London: 206 pp.
- Step E. (1929) British Insect Life: A Popular Introduction to Entomology, (Illustrator: Alfred Priest) T. Werner Laurie Ltd., London: 264 pp.
- Step E. (1930) Nature Rambles: an Introduction to Country-lore, (4 volumes) Frederick Warne & Co. Ltd., London & NY: 256 pp.
- Step E. (1931) Nature in the Garden: Wild Life at our Doors, Frederick Warne & Co. Ltd., London & NY: 256 pp.
- Step E. (1932) Bees, Wasps, Ants and Allied Insects of the British Isles, (published posthumously) Frederick Warne & Co. Ltd., London & NY: 238 pp.
