= Lothar Forcart =

Lothar Forcart, full name Lothar Hendrich Emil Wilhelm Forcart-Müller, abbreviated as Lothar H. E. W. Forcart, (1902–1990) was a zoologist, malacologist, and herpetologist from Switzerland.

He is commemorated in the scientific name of a species of snake, Calamaria forcarti.
