= Adolf Stossich =

19th-century Austrian naturalist

Adolf (Adolfo) Stossich (16 January 1824 in Fiume – 24 June 1900 in Trieste) was an Austrian naturalist. He was the father of helminthologist Michele Stossich.

He received his education in Vienna, and from 1861 to 1891 worked as a teacher at an upper secondary school in Trieste. He conducted studies of bryozoans native to the Kvarner Gulf as well as research of marine, terrestrial and freshwater mollusks of the Adriatic region. As a malacologist he worked closely with Simon Robič (1824–1897). During his career, he served as secretary of the Società agraria di Trieste and as vice-president of the Società Adriatica di Scienze naturali.

== Taxa named after Adolf Stossich ==
- Clausilia stossichi, described by Oskar Boettger (1878).
- Hippeutis stossichi, described by Stefan Clessin, (1878).
- Mangelia stossiciana, described by Spiridon Brusina (1869).

== Selected writings ==
- Fauna adriatica, pars I. (1862).
- Index molluscorum, quae usque adhuc reperit: Series I. (1862).
- Una excursiona botanica sul monte Slavnik nel litorale, 1863 – A botanical excursion to Slavnik.
- Enumerazione dei Molluschi del Golfo di Trieste (1865) – Enumeration of mollusks from the Gulf of Trieste.
- Il caseificio alla Esposizione industriale agricola austro-ungarica in Trieste nell'anno 1882, (1882) – The dairy farm at the Austro-Hungarian Industrial Exhibition in Trieste in 1882.
