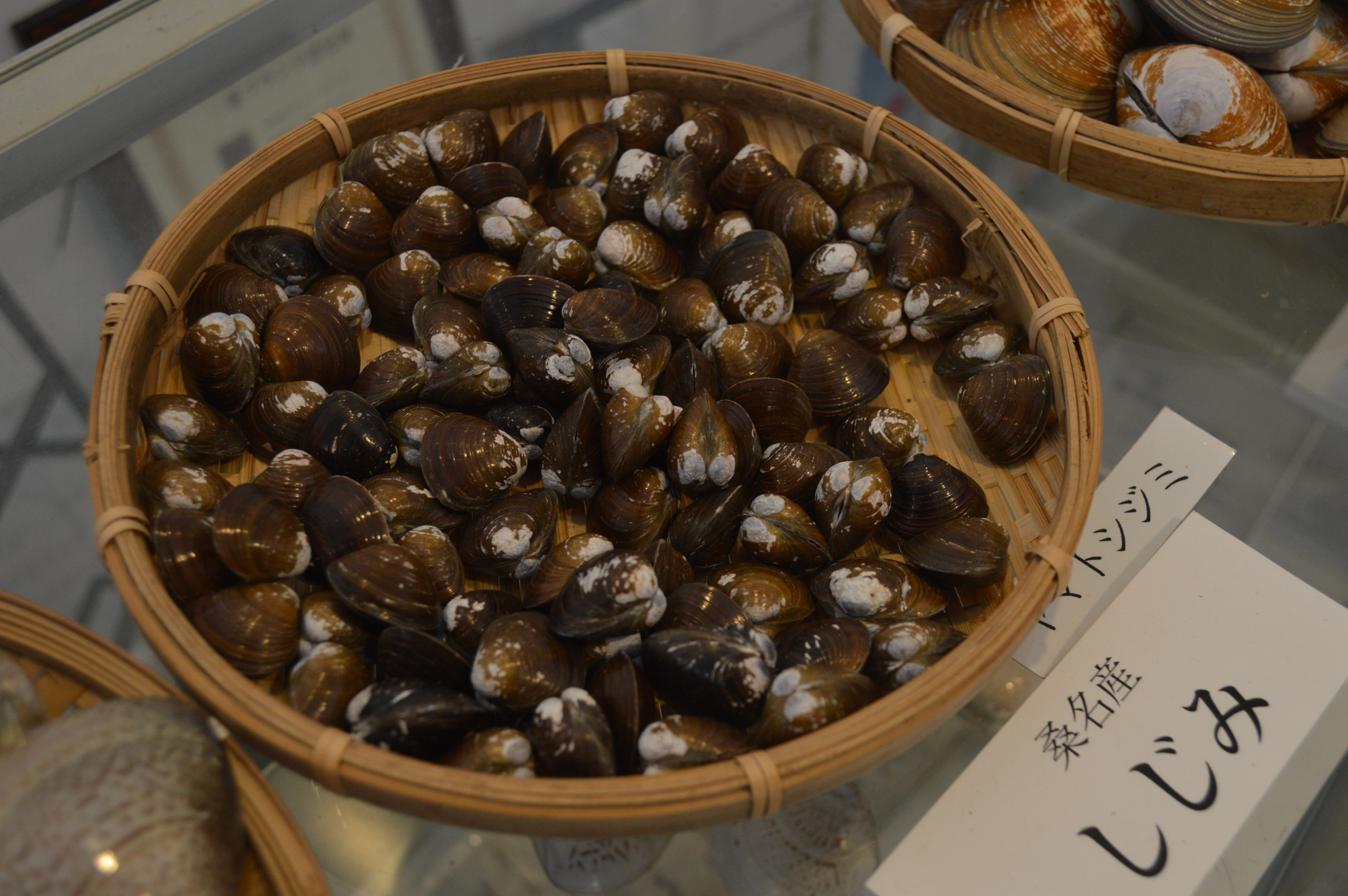
- Shijimi (Corbicula japonica) being sold in Kuwana City, Japan

Scientific classification
- Kingdom: Animalia
- Phylum: Mollusca
- Class: Bivalvia
- Order: Venerida
- Superfamily: Cyrenoidea
- Family: Cyrenidae
- Genus: Corbicula
- Species: C. japonica

Binomial name
- Corbicula japonica Prime, 1864

= Corbicula japonica =

Species of bivalve

Corbicula japonica is an edible species of brackishwater clam, a bivalve mollusk in the family Cyrenidae, the basket clams. Its common names include Japanese basket clam, Japanese blue clam, and shijimi (its Japanese name).

== Summary ==
Japanese basket clams settle at the mouths of rivers in brackish water. During low tide, people are able to see them in tidal flats and collect them for food. Their shells are roughly 30–35 mm and are reddish-brown while young, turning black as they mature. Their shells are glossy and have a tendency to grow concentric circles from their base, similar to Corbicula fluminea. The inside of their shells is purple when they are young and becomes white as they mature. Their reproduction is based on gonochorism.

== Culinary Use ==
=== Japan ===
In Japan, the clam is usually called shijimi, though this technically refers to the Corbicula genus in general. The more precise name is yamato-shijimi ("Japanese corbicula"). Shijimi and asari, (Lajonkairia lajonkairii) are two of the most common clams used in soups and tsukudani (simmered seafood).

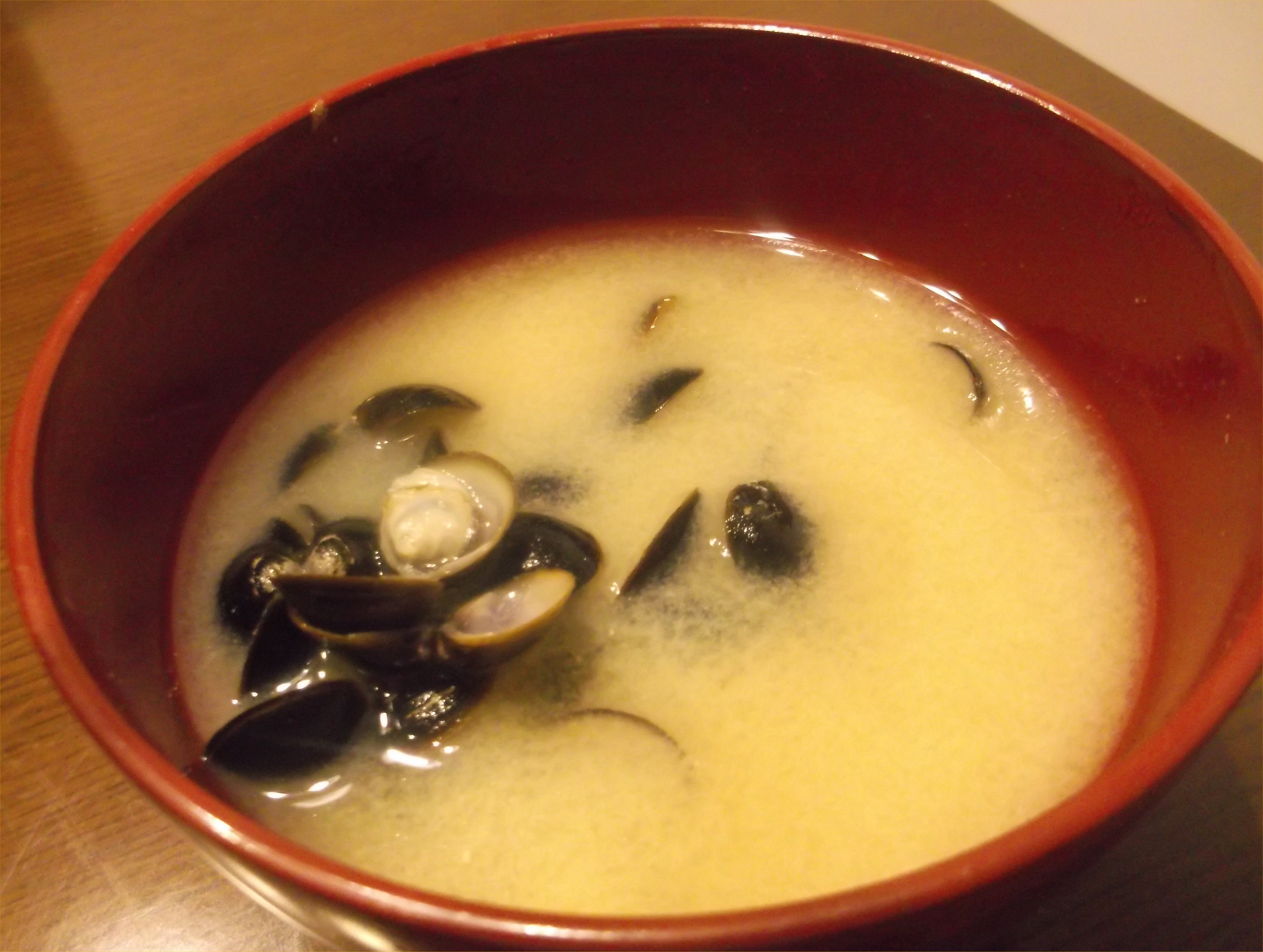
Shijimi miso soup

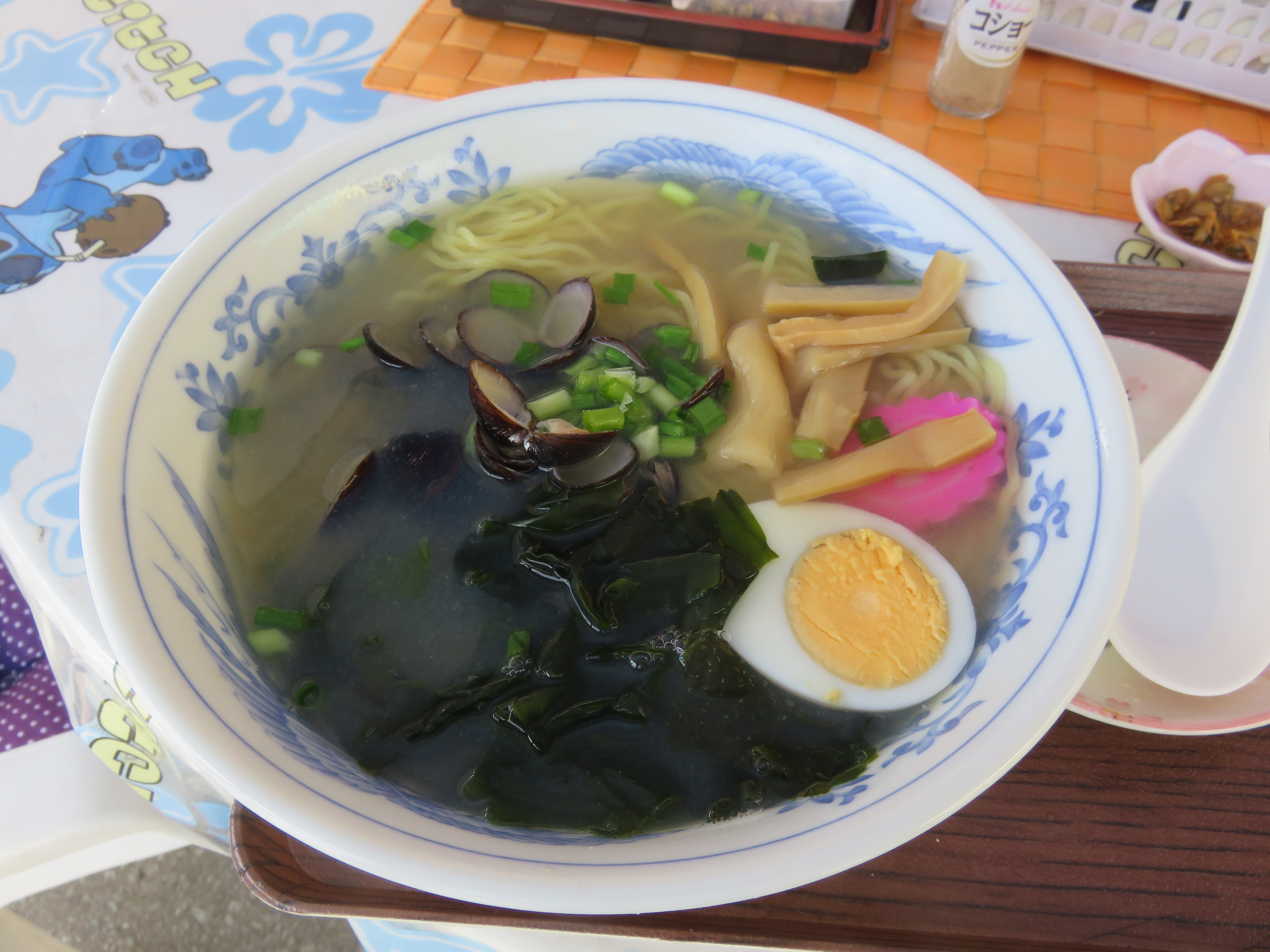
Shijimi in ramen

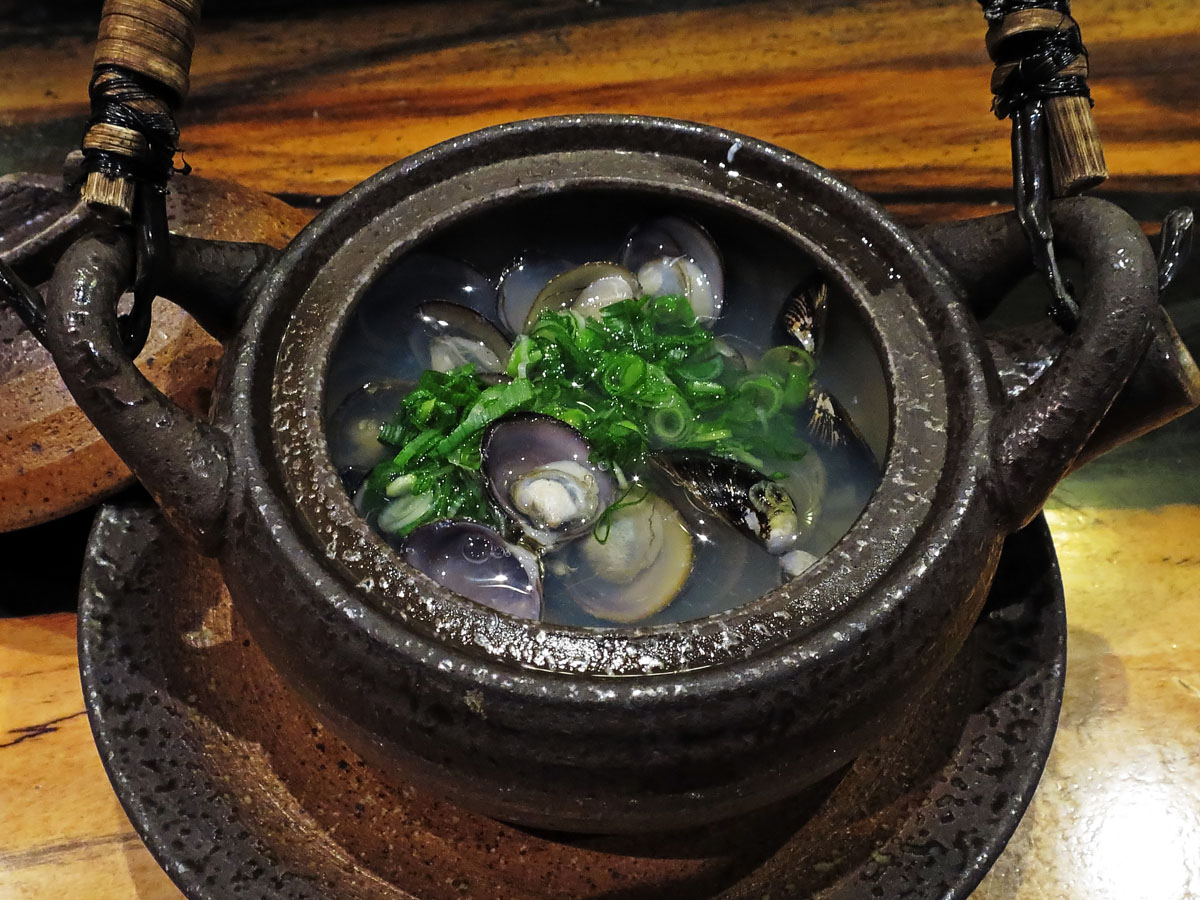

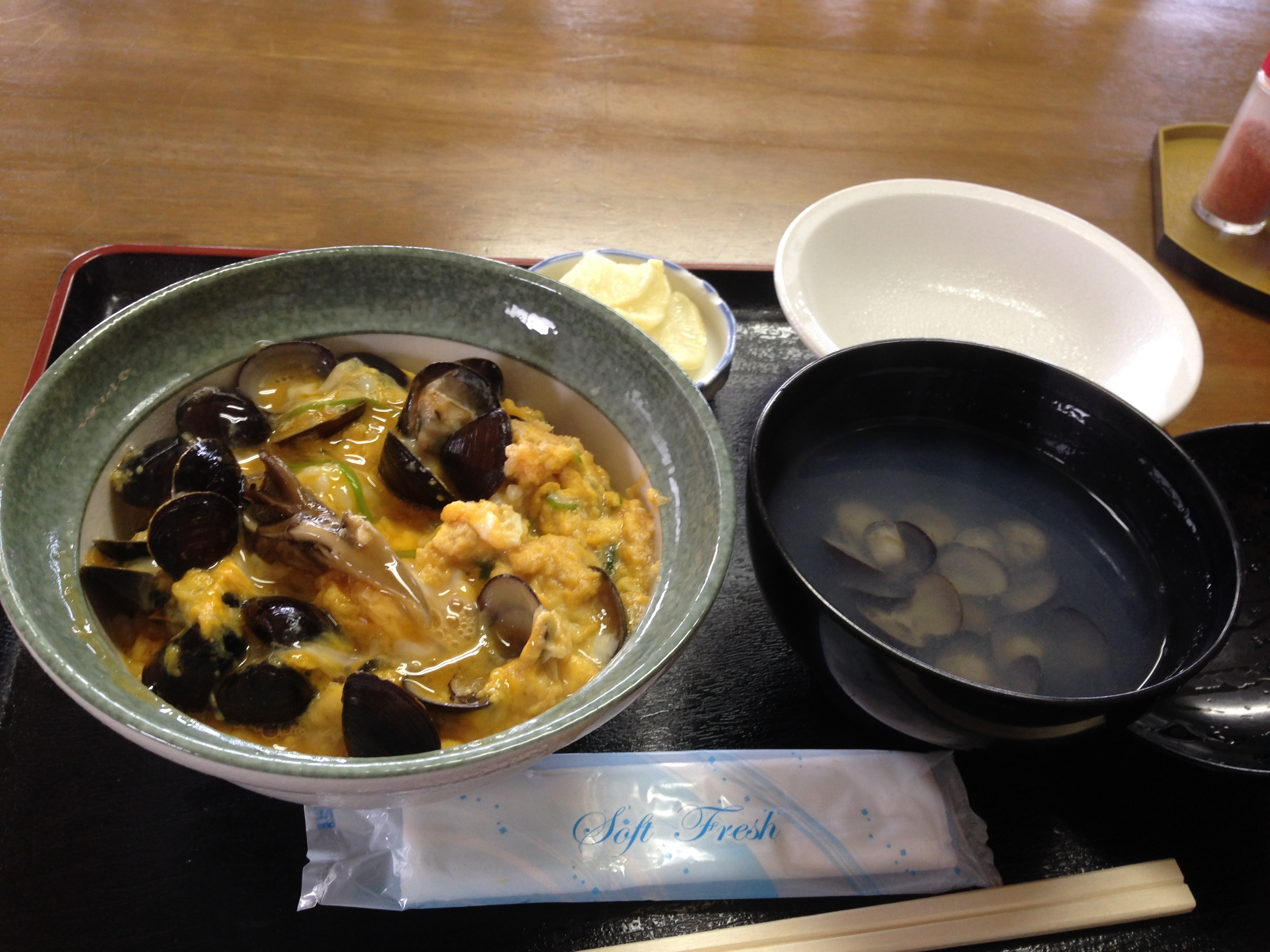

== See also ==
- Ornithine
