= Gerard Spaink =

Dutch malacologist (1928–2005)

Gerard Spaink (13 October 1928 in Amsterdam - 2005) was a Dutch malacologist.

== Taxa described ==
- Spisula hartingi Spaink, 1958 - n. sp.
- Divaricella juttingae Spaink, 1965 - n. sp.
- Astarte omalii peelensis Spaink, 1968 - n. ssp.
- Architectonica neerlandica Spaink, 1968 - n. sp.
- Chrysallida andersoni Spaink, 1968 - n. sp.
- Astarte alternicostata Spaink, 1972 - n. sp.
- Astarte irregularis Spaink, 1972 - n. sp.
- Astarte omalii latecostata Spaink, 1972 - nomen novum
- Astarte mutabilis altenai Spaink, 1972 - n. ssp.
- Altenaeum nortoni Spaink, 1972 - n. gen, n. sp.
- Astarte neerlandica Spaink, 1974 - nom. nov.
- Crassatella flandrica Spaink, 1978 - n. sp.
- Martesia losserensis Spaink, 1978 - n. sp.
- Nassarius tjoernensis Spaink, 1980 - n. sp.

== Bibliography ==
Bibliography of Gerard Spaink include:

(incomplete)

- (in Dutch) Spaink G. (1952). Zoetwatermollusken. Uitg. Hybicommissie van de Nederlandse Jeugdbond voor Natuurstudie, 20 p.
- Spaink G. (1958) "Spisula hartingi nov. spec., a new bivalve from the Eemian in the Netherlands". Basteria 22(1): 15-17.
- (in Dutch) Spaink G. (1958). "De Nederlandse Eemlagen, I: Algemeen Overzicht". Wetenschappelijke Mededelingen K.N.N.V. 29: 44 p.
- (in Dutch) Spaink G. (1960). "De afdeling Macro-palaeontologie van de Geologische Dienst". Correspondentieblad van de Nederlandse Malacologische Vereniging 90: 910-912.
- Spaink G. (1965). "Divaricella juttingae nov. spec. from the older Pleistocene of Western Europe". Basteria 29(1-4): 55-60.
- (in Dutch) Spaink G. (1965). Eocene fossielen uit de ondergrond van West Zeeuwsch-Vlaanderen. Pl. I. In: F.F.F.E. van Rummelen, Toelichting bij de Geologische Kaart van Nederland 1 : 50.000. Bladen Zeeuwsch-Vlaanderen West en Oost. - Geologische Stichting. Haarlem, 79 p.
- (in Dutch) Spaink G. (1965). Mollusken uit de Formatie van Merksem in Oost Zeeuwsch-Vlaanderen. Pl. II. In: F.F.F.E. van Rummelen, Toelichting bij de Geologische Kaart van Nederland 1 : 50.000. Bladen Zeeuwsch-Vlaanderen West en Oost. - Geologische Stichting. Haarlem. 79 p.
- Spaink G. & Norton P. E. P. (1967). "The stratigraphical range of Macoma balthica (l.) [Bivalvia, Tellinacea] in Pleistocene of the Netherlands and eastern England". Mededelingen van de Geologische Stichting, N.S. 18: 39-44.
- (in Dutch) Spaink G. (1967). Fauna uit de Zanden van Oploo, uit boring 52A/22 (ROD flachbohrung 37) te Oploo bij 54-58 m. Plaat III en IV. In: J.C. van den Toorn, Toelichting bij de Geologische Kaart van Nederland 1 : 50.000. Blad Venlo West (52 W). - Geologische Stichting, Haarlem, 162 p.
- (in Dutch) Spaink G. (1967). Mollusken uit de Brabantse Leem (Weichselien) van het Peelgebied. Plaat V. In: J.C. van den Toorn, Toelichting bij de Geologische Kaart van Nederland 1 : 50.000. Blad Venlo West (52 W). - Geologische Stichting, Haarlem, 162 p.
- (in Dutch) Spaink G. (1968). "Een bijzondere continentale molluskenfauna uit het Oud Pleistoceen uit een kleigroeve tussen Bavel en Dorst nabij Breda". Correspondentieblad van de Nederlandse Malacologische Vereniging 129: 1382-1383.
- Spaink G. (1968). "Astarte omalii peelensis n. ssp., Architectonica neerlandica n.sp. and Chrysallida andersoni n.sp. from the Miocene of the Netherlands and Western Germany". Basteria 32(1-3): 8-12.
- Spaink G. (1972). "Description of some species and subspecies of the genus Astarte from the Neogene of the Netherlands". Basteria 36(1): 21-29.
- Spaink G. (1972). "Altenaeum nortoni nov. gen. nov. spec. (Lamellibranchia: Condylocardiidae) from the Pleistocene of the Southern North Sea Basin". Basteria 36(2-5): 143-148.
- Norton P. E. P. & Spaink G. (1973). "The earliest occurrence of Macoma balthica (L.) as a fossil in the North Sea deposits". Malacologia 14: 33-37.
- (in Dutch) Spaink G. (1975). Zonering van het mariene Onder-Pleistoceen en Plioceen op grond van mollusken-fauna's. Toelichting bij Geologische Overzichtskaarten van Nederland: 118-122 (Rijks Geologische Dienst, Haarlem).
- (in Dutch) Spaink G. (1976). Tertiaire Cephalopoda I. Malacologische Opstellen, 19-28 (W. Backhuijs, Rotterdam).
- (in Dutch) Spaink G., Römer J. H. & Anderson W. F. (1978). "Het Eoceen in de lokaalmoraine van Losser". N.G.V., Staringia 4: 39 p.
- Jansen J. H. F., Doppert J. W. C., Hoogendoorn-Toering K., Jong J. de & Spaink G. (1979). "Late Pleistocene and Holocene deposits in the Witch and Fladen Ground area, Northern North Sea". Netherlands Journal of Sea Research 13(1): 1-39.
- (in Russian) Gladenkov Yu. B., Norton P. E. P. & Spaink G. (1980). "Verkii Kainozoic Islandii (Stratigrafiya Pliotsena-Pleistotsena i paleontologicheskie kompleksi) [Upper Cenozoic of Iceland (Pliocene-Pleistocene stratigraphy and palaeontological assemblages)]". Acad. Sc. USSR, Transactions 345: 116 p. (in Russian with English summary).
- (in Dutch) Spaink G. (1980). Typen en typoiden van Nederlandse Eoceen-fossielen. Grondboor en Hamer, 34(5): 155-176.
- Denys L., Sebbe L., Sliggers B. C., Spaink G., Strijdonck M. van & Verbruggen C. (1983). "Litho- and biostratigraphical study of Quaternary deep marine deposits of the Western Belgian coastal plain. Mollusc investigation". Bulletin van de Belgische Vereniging voor Geologie 92(2): 140-145.
