= Edward Thomas Connold =

English naturalist and writer

Edward Thomas Connold (11 June 1862 Hastings - January 1910 St Leonards-on-Sea), was an English naturalist and writer with a particular interest in oak galls.

An amateur scientist who earned his living as grocer, Connold had a very wide range of interests as evinced by his numerous contributions to The Hastings and East Sussex Naturalist. His interests extended to include shells, wasps, caterpillars, wildflowers and marine life, though his most important work was in the field of plant galls. Margaret Redfern in her 2011 book Plant Galls attributes to him the discovery of galls on the roots of plants. Before his death he was preparing a work on British wild fruits for publication. His plant-gall collection was left to the Hastings Museum, an institution he enthusiastically supported. At the formation of the Hastings and St. Leonards Natural History Society in 1893 he was elected honorary secretary, and was a popular speaker on natural history topics.

His son Harold Thomas Connold (*26 May 1889 Hastings) was a noted photographer who worked for the Royal Engineers during World War I, having served in a Scottish regiment. On his return to London in 1919 he worked as a photographer for Russell & Sons in Baker Street.

== Books ==
- British Vegetable Galls (1901)
- British Oak Galls (1908)
- Gleanings from the Fields of Nature (1908)
- Plant Galls of Great Britain (1909)
