= Erich Wagler =

German ichthyologist and malacologist

- Born: September 7, 1884
- Died: August 29, 1951 (aged 66)
- Education: Leipzig University; University of Jena
- Scientific career
- Fields: Ichthyology; malacology
- Workplaces: Leipzig University

Erich Wagler (7 September 1884 in Zwickau – 29 August 1951) was a German ichthyologist and malacologist.

He studied natural sciences in Leipzig and Jena, obtaining his doctorate in zoology at Leipzig in 1912. From 1920 to 1926 he worked as a privat-docent, afterwards serving as a "non-scheduled associate professor" at the University of Leipzig.

== Written works ==
- Faunistische und biologische Studien an freischwimmenden Cladoceren Sachsens, 1912 - Faunistic and biological studies of free-swimming cladocerans in Saxony.
- Amphipoda der Deutschen Tiefsee-Expedition. 2, Scinidae (1926) - part of the series: Wissenschaftliche Ergebnisse der Deutschen Tiefsee-Expedition auf dem Dampfer Valdivia 1898/99, 20,6. - Amphipoda from the German Deepsea Expedition of 1898–99, Scinidae.
- Die Sciniden der deutschen Südpolar-Expedition 1901-1903, 1927 - Scinidae from the German South Pole Expedition of 1901–03.
- Die Tierwelt der Nord- und Ostsee, 1929 (with Georg Grimpe) - Fauna of the North and Baltic Seas.
- Die Coregonen in den Seen des Voralpengebietes - Whitefish native to the lakes of the Alpine region.
- Crustacea (Krebstiere), 1937 - Crustacea.
- Die Tierwelt Mitteleuropas, 1937 (with other authors) - Fauna of Central Europe.
