= Georg Grimpe =

German zoologist and malacologist

Johann Georg Grimpe (16 February 1889, in Leipzig – 22 January 1936) was a German zoologist and malacologist.

He studied zoology and comparative anatomy at the University of Leipzig, where under the influence of Carl Chun (1852–1914), he focused his energies towards research of marine fauna, especially cuttlefish. He conducted studies at marine biology stations in Naples, Villefranche-sur-Mer, Helgoland and Monaco. In 1912 he obtained his doctorate with a dissertation on the vascular system of Octopoda.

After graduation, he worked as an assistant at the Leipzig Zoo, being tasked with scientific design issues concerning its aquarium and terrarium. From 1915 he was an assistant in the zoological institute at the university. In 1922 he began work as a lecturer at Leipzig, and in 1928 became an associate professor.

He is the taxonomic authority of numerous taxa, including the cephalopod order Vampyromorpha and the families Stauroteuthidae and Chtenopterygidae.

In 1933 Grimpe signed the Vow of allegiance of the Professors of the German Universities and High-Schools to Adolf Hitler and the National Socialistic State.

== Published works ==
With ichthyologist Erich Wagler (1884–1951), he collaborated on a textbook of marine biology titled "Die Tierwelt der Nord- und Ostsee" (Fauna of the North and Baltic Seas), and beginning in 1927, he was editor of the journal "Der Zoologische Garten". He also made significant contributions towards "Brehms Thierleben" (Brehm's Animal Life), a popular zoological encyclopedia. Other noted works by Grimpe include:

- Zur Kenntnis der Cephalopodenfauna der Nordsee, 1925 - To the knowledge of cephalopods of the North Sea.
- Die Cephalopoden des arktischen Gebietes, 1933 - Cephalopods of Arctic regions.
