= American Malacological Society =

- Formation: 1931; 95 years ago
- Type: not-for-profit membership scientific society
- Headquarters: Philadelphia, USA
- President: Jingchun Li
- Website: ams.wildapricot.org

The American Malacological Society (AMS) is a scientific organization devoted to the study of mollusks, including snails, clams, octopuses, and related animals. Founded in 1931, it is one of North America's oldest and most prominent organizations dedicated to malacology, the branch of zoology that deals with mollusks.

== History ==
The society was originally established as the American Malacological Union (AMU) in 1931. It was created to bring together professional and amateur malacologists, promote knowledge exchange, and encourage research in the field. In 1997, the organization officially changed its name to the American Malacological Society to reflect its broader scientific mission and growing international membership.

== Mission and objectives ==
The American Malacological Society aims to advance the scientific study and understanding of mollusks by promoting research in malacology and conchology, supporting education and public awareness about mollusks and their ecological roles, encouraging collaboration among researchers, educators, students, and hobbyists, and recognizing excellence in malacological research through grants, scholarships, and awards.

== Publications ==
The society publishes the American Malacological Bulletin, a peer-reviewed scientific journal that features original research articles, reviews, and notes on all aspects of malacology. The journal is issued biannually and serves as an important platform for disseminating malacological research internationally.

== Conferences and activities ==
AMS hosts an annual meeting that brings together malacologists from around the world to present research, discuss recent developments, and foster academic collaboration. These meetings typically include scientific presentations, workshops, student sessions, and field trips. The society also grants students and early-career researchers travel grants and research awards.

== Membership ==
Membership in the AMS is open to anyone interested in the study of mollusks. The society includes a diverse community of scientists, educators, students, and enthusiasts from various disciplines and regions.
