= Temple Prime =

American conchologist

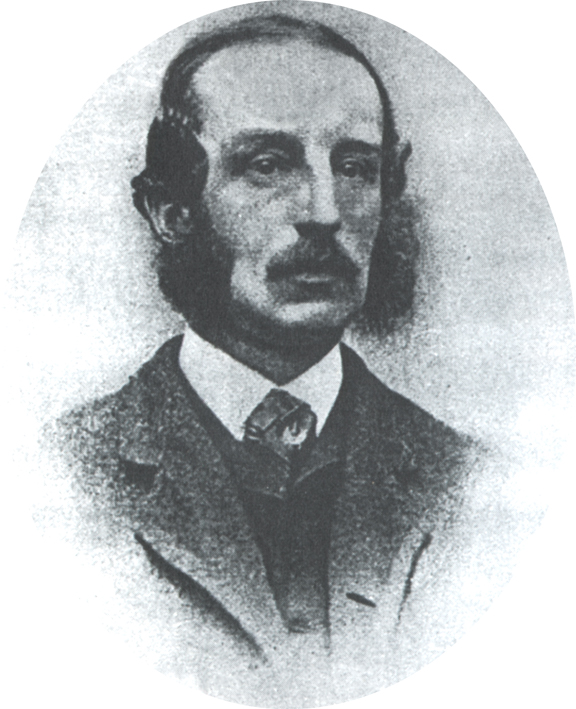
Temple Prime

Temple Prime (September 14, 1832, New York City – February 25, 1903, New York City) was an American amateur conchologist. He studied under Louis Agassiz at Harvard University. He described several new species of the bivalve family Cycladidae.

Prime was also an amateur genealogist, publishing several books on his own family history.
