= Nikola Pešić =

Serbian sculpturist (born 1973)

- Born: 1973 (age 52–53); Belgrade, Yugoslavia
- Education: State Academy of Fine Arts Stuttgart
- Style: Sculpture

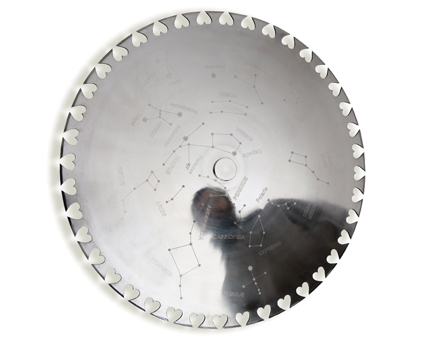
Forty Holy Martyrs by Nikola Pešić

Nikola Pešić (born 1973) is a Serbian sculptor and painter.

== Early life ==
Pešić was born in Belgrade in 1973. He graduated from the Academy of Fine Arts in Belgrade with the degree of painting, although he completed his master's degree in sculpture in class of Professor Mrđan Bajić in 1998.

In 1999, he got a scholarship from the German Academic Exchange Service (DAAD) when he went to Stuttgart, where he finished his post-graduate studies at the State Academy of Fine Arts in the class of Professor Micha Ullman.

Pešić's works (sculptures, objects) have been represented at many important exhibitions in Serbia (Oktobarski salon) and at different art fairs in Europe (Viennafair in Vienna and Art Fair in Cologne) by Zvono Gallery.

Nikola Pešić is a member of ULUS (Visual Artists Association of Serbia).

== Pešić's art ==
Nikola Pešić's art consists of highly esthetic objects which hide and generate at the same time different meanings by means of their simple pleasing forms and lines. The interpretation of Pešić's art is based on symbolic models of Christianity, gnosticism and non-Christian religions. According to Nikola, art must be attractive "at first sight". His sculptures are made of transparent and dim polyesters, epoxy and acrylic resins, magnifying glasses, mirrors, brass and other polished and reflecting materials. Even though Pesic tries to achieve perfection, he rarely uses machines when manufacturing his sculptures, and he usually does everything manually. As he himself says: "My sculptures should reflect my wish to make something perfect, and at the same time the impossibility to do it. I think that the manually shaped forms have special enchant and power.

One of the characteristics of Pesić's art is absolute absence of politics in his works. Pesić, if looks some political idol at all, he looks for it in bogumils, cathars and gnostics, because like them, he does not have any need to belong to any state, political option or church.

== Exhibitions ==
=== Selection of the group exhibitions ===
- 39. October Salon, 25 May Museum, Belgrade, 1998
- From April to April, Andrićev venac Gallery, Belgrade, 1998
- III Yugoslav Biennal of Youth, Konkordija, Vršac, 1998
- Art Critic's Selection, Gallery of The Belgrade Cultural Center, Belgrade, 1998
- 40. October Salon, 25 May Museum, Belgrade, 1999
- Internationale Biennale neues Aquarell, Kleinsassen, 1999
- Selection From the Nineties, Museum of Contemporary Art, Belgrade, 2000
- En Fin, Unesco Gallery, Paris, 2000
- Niveau, Schloss Solitude, Stuttgart, 2001
- 42. October Salon, Marija Dragojlović's selection, Belgrade 2001
- V Yugoslav Biennal of Youth, Konkordija, Vrsac, 2002
- 43. October Salon, Belgrade, 2002
- Funkshion, Miami Beach, USA, 2004
- 37. Herceg Novi Winter Art Salon, Herceg Novi, 2004
- 20/21, ZVONO Gallery, Belgrade, 2005
- 46. October Salon, Belgrade, 2005

=== Solo exhibitions ===
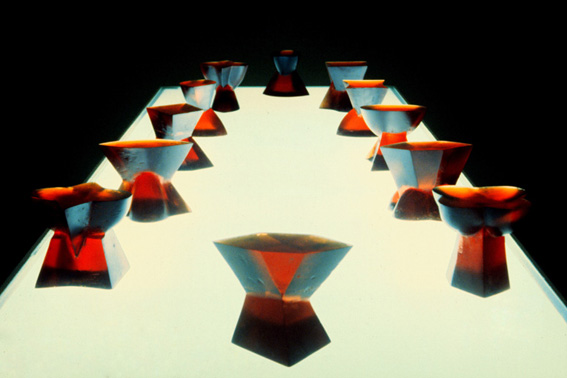
Twelve Red by Nikola Pešić

- Objects and Sculptures, ZVONO Gallery, Belgrade, 1997
- Bad Time Stories, ZVONO Gallery, Belgrade, 1998
- One Two Three, Youth Center Gallery, Belgrade, 2000
- Material World, ZVONO Gallery, Belgrade, 2002
- Sofort Waschen, ZVONO Gallery, Belgrade, 2003

=== Art fairs ===
- Viennafair, Vienna, 2005, 2006
- Art Fair, Cologne, 2006
