= Vladimir Pešić =

Montenegrin biologist

- Citizenship: Montenegro
- Scientific career
- Fields: Arachnology and malacology
- Institutions: University of Montenegro
- Website: https://www.researchgate.net/profile/Vladimir_Pesic

Vladimir Pešić (born 1973) is a scientist from Montenegro, and a biologist who is an expert on Hydrachnidiae, the water mites. He is also a co-author taxon authority for a new species of freshwater snail (Valvata montenegrina) Glöer & Pešić, 2008 (Valvatidae, Gastropoda). Pešić works in the Department of Biology at the University of Montenegro, at Podgorica. He is editor of the journal Ecologica Montenegrina.

Pešić, along with his team, has discovered a new species of Litarachna in Puerto Rico and named it Litarachna lopezae, after Jennifer Lopez.

== Marine species described by Pešić ==
The World Register of Marine Species lists the following species

- Litarachna antalyaensis Pešić, Durucan & Chatterjee, 2018
- Litarachna bruneiensis Pesic, Chatterjee, Marshall & Pavicevic, 2011
- Litarachna caribica Pesic, Chatterjee & Schizas, 2008
- Litarachna enigmatica Pešić, Durucan & Chatterjee, 2018
- Litarachna muratsezgini Pešić, Durucan & Zawal, 2019
- Litarachna smiti Pesic, Chatterjee, Ahmed Abada, 2008
- Pontarachna arabica Pesic, Chatterjee & Ahmed Abada, 2008
- Pontarachna nemethi Pesic, Chatterjee & Schizas, 2012
- Pontarachna turcica Pešić, Durucan & Zawal, 2019
