= Bailey-Matthews National Shell Museum =

Museum in Sanibel, Florida

Bailey-Matthews National Shell Museum & Aquarium
- Location within Florida Location within the United States
- Former name: Bailey-Matthews Shell Museum, Bailey-Matthews National Shell Museum
- Established: 1995
- Location: 3075 Sanibel-Captiva Road, Sanibel, Florida, 33957, U.S.
- Coordinates: 26.438145°N 82.092749°W
- Type: Malacology and Conchology
- Accreditation: American Alliance of Museums, 2010 Association of Zoos and Aquariums, 2022
- Director: Samuel Ankerson
- Curators: José H. Leal, PhD
- Architect: George "Tutts" Tuttle Jr.
- Website: Official website

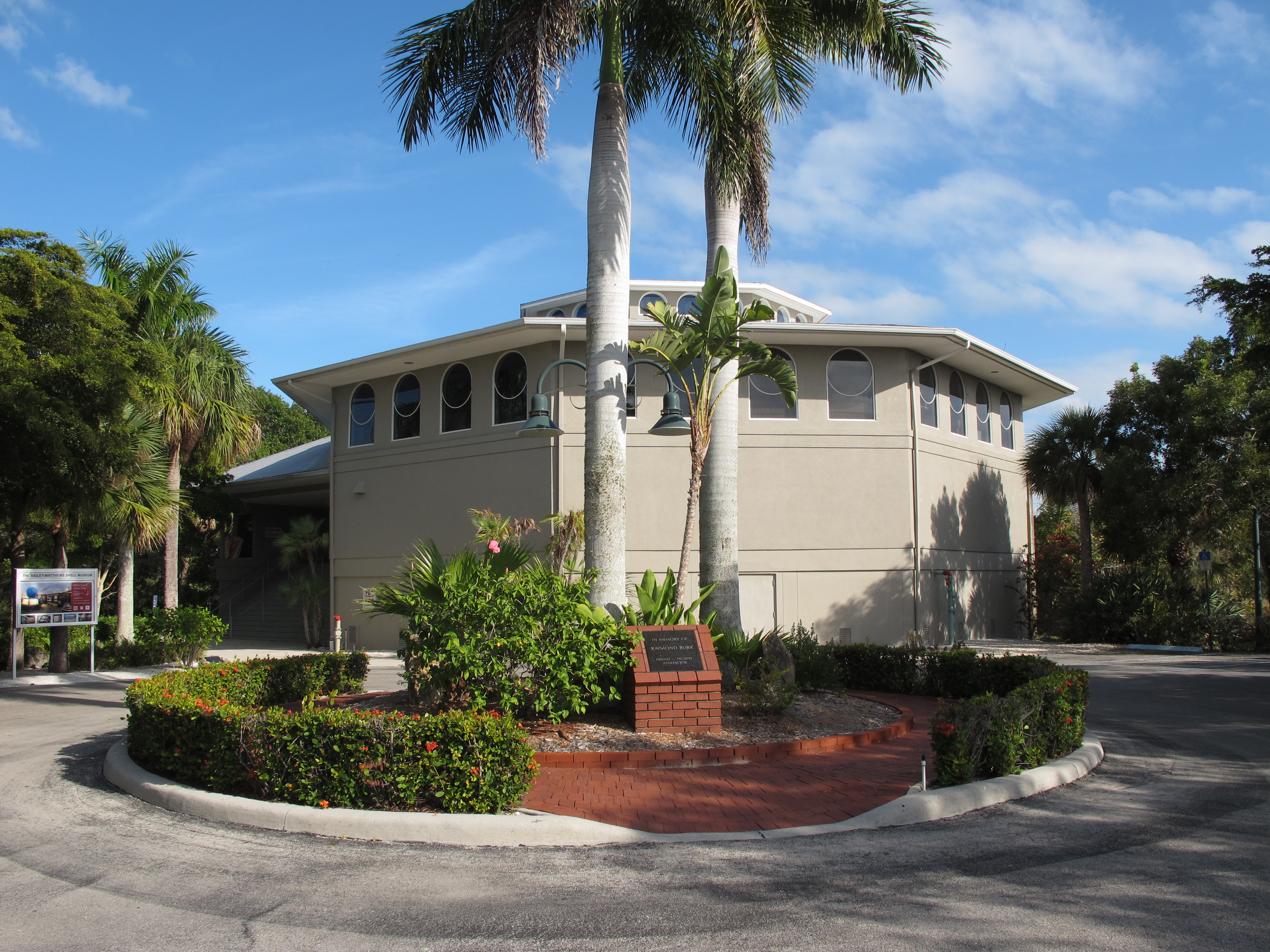
A 2011 view of the museum, the Raymond Burr Memorial Garden in the foreground

The Bailey-Matthews National Shell Museum & Aquarium is a museum and aquarium devoted to seashells, conchology, and malacology, including the paleontological and archeological/anthropological aspects of the study of shells. The museum is located in the city of Sanibel, Florida on the Gulf of Mexico coast of Southwest Florida.

The Bailey-Matthews National Shell Museum opened to the public in 1995, and operates as an information and reference center for national and international scientists, students, and shell enthusiasts, particularly those who are interested in the marine, terrestrial, and freshwater mollusks of the Gulf of Mexico and Florida. The Museum, which is a facility of the Shell Museum and Educational Foundation, Inc., received its first accreditation from the American Alliance of Museums in March 2010.

It was heavily damaged by Hurricane Ian and the museum reopened in February 2023.

== Sources of shells ==
The museum's exhibits include shells from all over the world. However, many shells on show in the museum are from Florida, and a substantial number are from Sanibel and Captiva islands. This is because Sanibel Island is considered one of the best seashell collecting spots in the world (comparable to Jeffreys Bay in Africa and the Sulu Archipelago in the Pacific). The museum also owns a collection of Pacific Ocean cowries and cones donated by actor Raymond Burr, who owned an island in the Fijis, and who led the efforts to raise funds to build the museum.

== Exhibits ==
Permanent exhibits include Living Gallery of Aquariums and Marine Life and the Great Hall of Shells. In addition, there are changing special exhibitions throughout the year.

== Great Hall of Shells ==
The Great Hall of Shells is the historic heart of the Museum, with extensive permanent exhibits of shells in an octagonal gallery space with 30-foot ceilings. Following significant damage from Hurricane Ian in 2022, the Museum embarked on a full re-design and re-installation of the shell exhibits and the Great Hall. The Great Hall of Shells partially reopened in May of 2025, featuring specimens from all over the world that are highlights selected from the Museum’s collection of nearly 600,000 shells. Themes of these exhibits include global biodiversity, shapes and colors, and time and evolution; and special focuses on groups including cones, cowries, volutes, murexes, scallops, and carrier shells.

The second phase, located in the periphery of the Hall, reopened in October of 2025. This final phase includes exhibits on Southwest Florida Shells, World Record Shells, Florida Land Snails, Florida Fossil Shells, shells in human History and Culture, use of shells by the Calusa people, and Conservation and Environmental Issues as they relate to mollusks. The completion of this phase marks the end of the Museum’s rebuilding following Hurricane Ian in 2022.

== Living Gallery of Aquariums and Marine Life ==
The Living Gallery of Aquariums and Marine Life exhibits approximately 60 species of mollusks and other animals including the giant pacific octopus, two-spot octopus, giant clam, queen conch, flamingo tongue, giant triton, dozens of mollusks common to Southwest Florida, cold water species found in the Pacific Northwest, and corals and fish from around the world.

Aquariums depict marine environments ranging from Pacific coral reefs to red mangrove ecosystems common in Southwest Florida. Large interactive touch pools of both warm and cold-water species give visitors the opportunity to touch mollusks including the red abalone, California sea hare, lightning whelk, Lewis moon snail, horse conch, and many others.

Supporting exhibits in the Living Gallery include videos, shell specimens, models, dioramas, photographs, and maps that explore molluscan biology, behavior, stories of adaptation, and conservation challenges and successes for this group of animals. One of the most popular features of the Living Gallery are two large, interactive touch pools where visitors may touch and learn about dozens of mollusk species from Southwest Florida and the Pacific Northwest.

Visitors to the Living Gallery can attend Keeper Chats each day at 11am and 2pm, at which Museum staff share facts about the animals in the Museum’s care. At 3:30 daily there are Touch Pool Talks, featuring stories about the biology and behavior of mollusks.

In 2022, the Bailey-Matthews National Shell Museum & Aquarium received accreditation by the Association of Zoos and Aquariums.

== History ==
In 1984, a bequest from local shell collector Charlene McMurphy provided seed funding for the concept of creating an educational museum about shells and mollusks on Sanibel. A consortium of other collectors (including members of the Sanibel-Captiva Shell Club), community members, and scientists responded, and in 1986 The Shell Museum and Research Foundation, Inc. became a 501(c)(3) non-profit organization with a goal to establish a new museum. In 1987 the world-renowned malacologist and author Dr. R. Tucker Abbott was brought on as an advisor. He enlisted the help of his celebrity friend – and shell collector – actor Raymond Burr (known for his role as Perry Mason) to help generate publicity and funds for the effort, and in 1991 Dr. Abbott was appointed Founding Director of the museum-to-be.

In 1989, three local brothers, Francis, Samuel, and John Bailey, generously deeded eight acres of land on Sanibel Captiva Road to the Museum. The gift memorialized their parents, Frank P. Bailey and Annie Mead Matthews, whose names the Museum now bears.

Construction began in 1994, and the Bailey-Matthews Shell Museum opened to the public in 1995.

Following the passing of Dr. Abbott, Dr. José H. Leal (at far left) was hired in 1996 as Executive Director, a role he served in for 17 years. Dr. Leal, a malacologist with an international reputation for his expertise in the classification and identification of mollusks, initiated and developed a robust range of educational programs and introduced an era of major growth in the Museum’s scientific collection of mollusks.

Over the decades the scientific collection has grown to nearly 600,000 specimens. While the collection’s strength is mollusks of Florida, the Gulf, and the Caribbean, it includes examples from all corners of the earth and is an important resource for exhibition, public education, enjoyment, and scientific research.

Thanks to grants from the Institute of Museum and Library Services and the National Science Foundation, the entire collection is catalogued, digitized, and available online. In 2010 the Museum earned accreditation by the American Alliance of Museums (AAM), which represents the highest standards in the museum industry for public education, collections care, and museum management.

In 2013, Dorrie Hipschman joined the Museum as Executive Director (with Dr. Leal assuming the role of Science Director and Curator) and oversaw a period of growth in staff, programming, and exhibits at the Museum.

New outreach programs such as Mollusks on the Move, launched in 2017, brought the Museum’s mission and educational offerings to new populations of K-12 students throughout Southwest Florida and today serves over 15,000 children.

In 2019, work began on the most significant transformation of the Museum since the institution’s 1995 opening. A major renovation resulted in a welcoming new Museum entrance, a flexible space for temporary exhibitions and events, and – most consequentially – the Living Gallery of Aquariums and Marine Life. Exhibiting over 300 animals and 60 species of marine life, the new aquarium exhibits opened in 2020 and bring to life mollusks from diverse marine habitats both local and global including octopuses, conchs, clams, cuttles, squids, cones, whelks, sea hares, and many more. In 2021, Sam Ankerson joined as Executive Director with a focus on broadening programs, building audiences, and growing partnerships regionally and nationally to help grow and further the impact of the Museum and its mission. In August 2022, the Museum earned accreditation by the Association of Zoos and Aquariums (AZA), becoming one of only about a dozen institutions to be accredited by both AAM and AZA.

== Hurricane Ian & Recovery ==
In September 2022, Category 4 Hurricane Ian struck Sanibel, causing catastrophic damage to the Museum including the destruction of the Living Gallery of Aquariums and major damage to the gallery housing the permanent exhibits of shells, known as the Great Hall of Shells. Thanks to an outpouring of support from the Museum’s friends, partners, and constituents, and the resilience of the communities of Sanibel and Southwest Florida, the Museum rebuilt and reopened to the public in March 2024. As part of the rebuilding, the Museum updated, expanded, and improved its permanent exhibits in both the Living Gallery of Aquariums and the Great Hall of Shells.
