= List of gastropods described in 2012 =

This list of gastropods described in 2012, is a list of new taxa of snails and slugs of every kind that have been described (following the rules of the ICZN) during the year 2012. The list only includes taxa at the level of genus or species. For changes in taxonomy above the level of genus, see Changes in the taxonomy of gastropods since 2005.

== Fossil gastropods ==
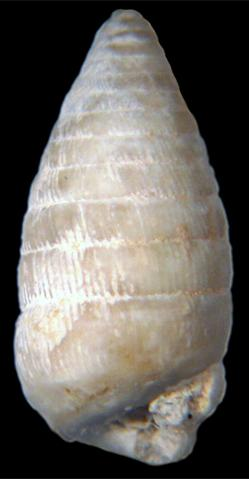
A fossilized shell of Brasilennea guttula

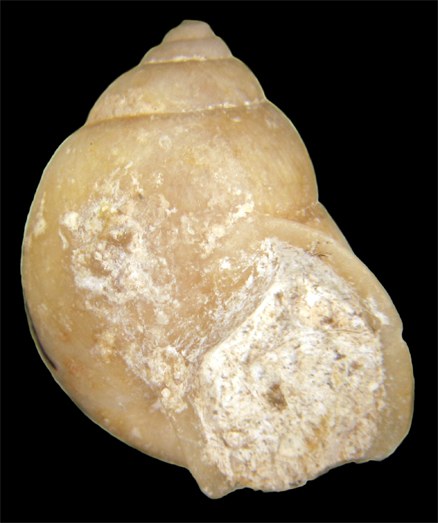
A fossilized shell of Eoborus rotundus

- Acilia? basistriata Nützel, Aghababalou & Senowbari-Daryan, 2012
- Agatrix agathe Landau, Petit & Da Silva, 2012
- Amphitrochus balinensis Gründel, 2012
- Ananias riccardii Pinilla, 2012
- Anoptychia? luxemburgensis Gründel, 2012
- Aphera aphrodite Landau, Petit & Da Silva, 2012
- Axelella cativa Landau, Petit & Da Silva, 2012
- Bahiensis priscus Cabrera & Martínez, 2012
- Bivetiella dilatata Landau, Petit & Da Silva, 2012
- Bulinus corici Harzhauser, Neubauer, Mandic, Zuschin & Ćorić, 2012
- Cancellaria harzhauseri Landau, Petit & Da Silva, 2012
- Cancellaria mixta Landau, Petit & Da Silva, 2012
- Cidarina lenzaniyeuensis del Rio, 2012
- Cryptaulax redelii Ferrari, 2012
- Emmericia roetzeli Harzhauser & Neubauer in Harzhauser et al., 2012
- Euclia alacertata Landau, Petit & Da Silva, 2012
- Ferrissia crenellata Harzhauser & Neubauer in Harzhauser et al., 2012
- Gyraulus sachsenhoferi Harzhauser & Neubauer in Harzhauser et al., 2012
- Gyroscala daniana del Rio, 2012
- Heteroterma carmeloi del Rio, 2012
- Massyla toulai Landau, Petit & Da Silva, 2012
- Microfulgur concheyroae del Rio, 2012
- Nematurella zuschini Harzhauser & Neubauer in Harzhauser et al., 2012
- Odontohydrobia groisenbachensis Harzhauser & Neubauer in Harzhauser et al., 2012
- Odontohydrobia pompatica Harzhauser & Neubauer in Harzhauser et al., 2012
- Odontohydrobia styriaca Harzhauser & Neubauer in Harzhauser et al., 2012

from Archiv für Molluskenkunde

- Brasilennea guttula Salvador & Simone, 2012
- Eoborus rotundus Salvador & Simone, 2012

from The Veliger:

- Amarophos woodringi Landau & da Silva, 2012
- Amarophos arayaensis Landau & da Silva, 2012
- Harpa daisyae Landau, Frydman, & da Silva, 2012

Other taxa

- genus Angulasina Gründel, 2012
- genus Europrotomus Kronenberg & Harzhauser, 2012
- genus Kaneconcha Kaim & Warén, 2012
- genus Montreuilbellona Gründel, 2012
- genus Myurusina Gründel, 2012

== Marine gastropods ==
- Adfacelina Millen & Hermosillo, 2012
- Adfacelina medinai Millen & Hermosillo, 2012
- Austromitra decresca Simone & Cunha, 2012
- Calliostoma tupinamba Dornellas, 2012
- Dolichupis akangus Simone & Cunha, 2012
- Dolichupis pingius Simone & Cunha, 2012
- Dondice galaxiana Millen & Hermosillo, 2012
- Microvoluta corona Simone & Cunha, 2012
- Mitromorpha mirim Simone & Cunha, 2012
- Mitromorpha sama Simone & Cunha, 2012
- Natica juani Costa & Pastorino, 2012
- Notocochlis laurae Costa & Pastorino, 2012
- Onustus aquitanus Simone & Cunha, 2012
- Paradoris adamsae Padula & Valdés, 2012
- Philinopsis anneae Ornelas-Gatdula & Valdés, 2012
- Pseudosimnia lacrima Simone & Cunha, 2012
- Subcancilla joapyra Simone & Cunha, 2012
- Terebra assu Simone & Cunha, 2012
- Turricostellaria amphissa Simone & Cunha, 2012
- Turricostellaria apyrahi Simone & Cunha, 2012
- Turricostellaria jukyry Simone & Cunha, 2012
- Turricostellaria ovir Simone & Cunha, 2012
- Unidentia angelvaldesi Millen & Hermosillo, 2012

Other taxa

- Family Unidentidae Millen & Hermosillo, 2012
- Genus Unidentia Millen & Hermosillo, 2012

== Freshwater gastropods ==
from Journal of Conchology:

- Bithynia yildirimi Glöer & Georgiev, 2012
- Gyraulus nedyalkovi Glöer & Georgiev, 2012

from Journal of Molluscan Studies:

- Fluminicola gustafsoni Hershler & Liu, 2012

== Land gastropods ==
from Papéis Avulsos de Zoologia:

- Anostoma tessa Simone, 2012
- Kora corallina Simone, 2012
- Megalobulimus amandus Simone, 2012
- Spiripockia punctata Simone, 2012
- Spixia coltrorum Simone, 2012

from Journal of Conchology:

- Escutiella Martínez-Orti & Borredà, 2012
- Macedonica dobrostanica Irikov, 2012
- Plagyrona angusta Holyoak & Holyoak, 2012
- Ponentina curtivaginata Holyoak & Holyoak 2012
- Ponentina excentrica Holyoak & Holyoak 2012
- Ponentina foiaensis Holyoak & Holyoak 2012
- Ponentina grandiducta Holyoak & Holyoak 2012
- Ponentina monoglandulosa Holyoak & Holyoak 2012
- Ponentina octoglandulosa Holyoak & Holyoak 2012
- Ponentina papillosa Holyoak & Holyoak 2012
- Trochonanina mwanihanae Rowson & Van Goethem, 2012
- Upembella nonae Rowson & Van Goethem, 2012

from Archiv für Molluskenkunde:

- Echinix Thompson & Naranjo-García, 2012
- Echinix ochracea Thompson & Naranjo-García, 2012
- Echinix granulata Thompson & Naranjo-García, 2012
- Echinix rugosa Thompson & Naranjo-García, 2012

from Zoosystema:

- Cyclopedus anselini Gargominy & Muratov, 2012
- Cyclopedus Gargominy & Muratov, 2012
- Pseudosubulina theoripkeni Gargominy & Muratov, 2012
- Pseudosubulina nouraguensis Gargominy & Muratov, 2012

Other taxa

- genus Agais Simone, 2012
- genus Kora Simone, 2012
- genus Spiripockia Simone, 2012
- Pyramidula kuznetsovi Schileyko & Balashov, 2012

== See also ==
- List of gastropods described in 2011
- List of gastropods described in 2013
