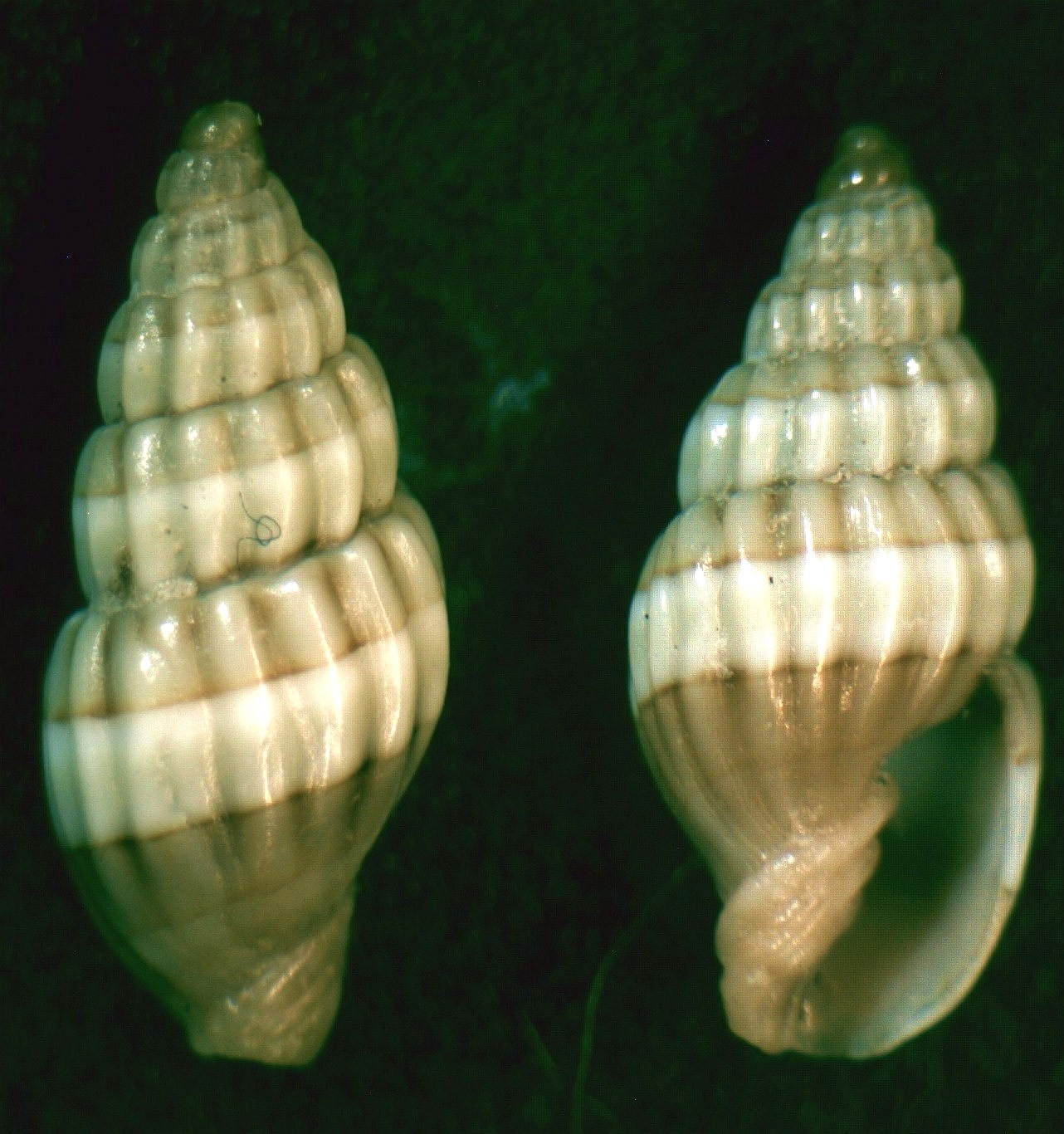
- Austromitra analogica tatei

Scientific classification
- Kingdom: Animalia
- Phylum: Mollusca
- Class: Gastropoda
- Subclass: Caenogastropoda
- Order: Neogastropoda
- Superfamily: Turbinelloidea
- Family: Costellariidae
- Genus: Austromitra; Finlay, 1926

Type species
- Columbella rubiginosa F. W. Hutton, 1873

Synonyms
- † Balcomitra Finlay, 1927; Vexillum (Austromitra) Finlay, 1926

= Austromitra =

Genus of gastropods

Austromitra is a genus of sea snails in the family Costellariidae.

They are small carnivorous marine gastropod mollusks, most of which are less than 15 mm in length. They live on hard substrates, intertidally and to a depth of at least 1000 m. The genus is found in southern Africa, southern Australia, New Caledonia, and New Zealand.

== Species ==
Species within the genus Austromitra include:

- Austromitra acherontis B. A. Marshall & Marrow, 2021
- † Austromitra ambulacrum (Marwick, 1926)
- Austromitra angulata (Suter, 1908)
- † Austromitra angusticostata Ludbrook, 1941
- Austromitra apicitincta (Verco, 1896)
- Austromitra arnoldi (Verco, 1909)
- Austromitra bathyraphe (Sowerby III, 1900)
- Austromitra bellapicta (Verco, 1909)
- Austromitra benschneideri Marrow, 2024
- Austromitra brunneopunctata Herrmann, R. Salisbury & J. C. Martin, 2019
- Austromitra burchi B. A. Marshall & Marrow, 2021
- Austromitra canaliculata (Sowerby III, 1900)
- Austromitra capensis (Reeve, 1845)
- Austromitra cernohorskyi Turner, 2008
- Austromitra cinnamomea (A. Adams, 1855)
- † Austromitra citharelloides (Tate, 1889)
- Austromitra crayssaci Herrmann, R. Salisbury & J. C. Martin, 2019
- Austromitra crosbyi B. A. Marshall & Marrow, 2021
- Austromitra decresca Simone & Cunha, 2012
- Austromitra diamantina Marrow, 2023
- Austromitra dissimilis (A. W. B. Powell, 1937)
- Austromitra distincta (Thiele, 1925)
- Austromitra doningtonensis Marrow, 2023
- Austromitra erecta A. W. B. Powell, 1934
- Austromitra euzonata G.B. Sowerby III, 1900
- Austromitra fallax B. A. Marshall & Marrow, 2021
- Austromitra fedosovi B. A. Marshall & Marrow, 2021
- Austromitra festiva B. A. Marshall & Marrow, 2021
- Austromitra gradusspira Lussi, 2015
- Austromitra hayesi Turner, 1999
- Austromitra heliantha S.-I Huang, 2026
- Austromitra hewittae Marrow, 2023
- Austromitra kowieensis (Sowerby III, 1901)
- † Austromitra lacertosa (Cernohorsky, 1970)
- Austromitra lamellata B. A. Marshall & Marrow, 2021
- Austromitra lawsi Finlay, 1930
- Austromitra leeuwinensis Marrow, 2023
- Austromitra legrandi (Tenison-Woods, 1876)
- Austromitra lincolnensis (Angas, 1878)
- Austromitra lirata B. A. Marshall & Marrow, 2021
- † Austromitra macra (H. J. Finlay, 1927)
- Austromitra minutenodosa Cernohorsky, 1980
- Austromitra morrisoni Marrow, 2024
- Austromitra mozambiquensis R. Salisbury, Gori & Rosado, 2024
- † Austromitra multiplicata Ludbrook, 1958
- Austromitra occidua B. A. Marshall & Marrow, 2021
- Austromitra opima B. A. Marshall & Marrow, 2021
- Austromitra ovata B. A. Marshall & Marrow, 2021
- Austromitra planata (Hutton, 1885)
- Austromitra ponderi B. A. Marshall & Marrow, 2021
- † Austromitra pumila (Tate, 1889)
- Austromitra quadrilineata Marrow, 2023
- † Austromitra quenelli C. A. Fleming, 1943
- † Austromitra ralphi (Cossmann, 1900)
- Austromitra regalis B. A. Marshall & Marrow, 2021
- Austromitra retrocurvata (Verco, 1909)
- Austromitra rhodarion (Kilburn, 1972)
- Austromitra rosa Fedosov, Bouchet, Dekkers, Gori, S.-I Huang, Kantor, Lemarcis, Marrow, Ratti, Rosenberg, R. Salisbury, Zvonareva & Puillandre, 2025
- Austromitra rosenbergi R. Salisbury, 2015
- Austromitra rottnestensis Marrow, 2023
- Austromitra rubiginosa (Hutton, 1873)
- Austromitra sansibarica (Thiele, 1925)
- Austromitra schomburgki (Angas, 1878)
- Austromitra semirosea Herrmann, R. Salisbury & J. C. Martin, 2019
- † Austromitra sordida (Tate, 1889)
- Austromitra stewarti B. A. Marshall & Marrow, 2021
- Austromitra tangaroa B. A. Marshall & Marrow, 2021
- Austromitra tasmanica (Tenison-Woods, 1876)
- Austromitra torosa B. A. Marshall & Marrow, 2021
- Austromitra translucida Marrow, 2023
- Austromitra tui B. A. Marshall & Marrow, 2021
- Austromitra valarieae Lussi, 2015
- Austromitra vercoi Marrow, 2023
- Austromitra viridimuscus Marrow & R. Salisbury, 2019
- Austromitra waltoni B. A. Marshall & Marrow, 2021
- Austromitra westralis Marrow, 2023
- Austromitra whissoni Marrow, 2023
- Austromitra willcoxae Herrmann, R. Salisbury & J. C. Martin, 2019
- Austromitra zafra Powell, 1952

== Synonyms ==
- [Austromitra aikeni Lussi, 2015: synonym of Kilburniola aikeni (Lussi, 2015)
- Austromitra analogica (Reeve, 1845): synonym of Cernohorskyola analogica (Reeve, 1845)
- Austromitra brunneacincta Powell, 1952: synonym of Austromitra planata (Hutton, 1885)
- Austromitra bucklandi Gabriel, 1962: synonym of Austromitra tasmanica (Tenison Woods, 1876)
- † Austromitra caudata Marwick, 1931: synonym of † Costellaria caudata (Marwick, 1931): synonym of †Vexillum caudatum (Marwick, 1931) (original combination)
- Austromitra erecta Powell, 1934: synonym of Austromitra rubiginosa (Hutton, 1873)
- Austromitra grovei Marrow & R. Salisbury, 2019: synonym of Cernohorskyola grovei (Marrow & R. Salisbury, 2019)
- Austromitra ima (Bartsch, 1915): synonym of Austromitra capensis (Reeve, 1845)
- Austromitra koumacensis Herrmann, R. Salisbury & J. C. Martin, 2019: synonym of Ponderiola koumacensis (Herrmann, R. Salisbury & J. C. Martin, 2019) (superseded combination)
- Austromitra maculosa Turner & Simone, 1997: synonym of Kilburniola maculosa (H. Turner & Simone, 1998)
- †Austromitra mawsoni Ludbrook, 1958 †: synonym of †Austromitra angusticostata Ludbrook, 1941
- † Austromitra pauciplicata Ludbrook, 1958: synonym of † Austromitra angusticostata Ludbrook, 1941
- Austromitra planatella Finlay, 1930: synonym of Austromitra planata (Hutton, 1885)
- † Austromitra plicifera Marwick, 1928: synonym of † Peculator pliciferus (Marwick, 1928)
- Austromitra rubiradix Finlay, 1926: synonym of Austromitra rubiginosa (Hutton, 1873)
- Austromitra scalariformis (Tenison Woods, 1876): synonym of Austromitra schomburgki (Angas, 1878)
- † Austromitra tricordata Beu, 1970: synonym of † Egestas tricordata (Beu, 1970)
- Austromitra volucra (Hedley, 1915): synonym of Cernohorskyola volucra (Hedley, 1915)
