= Austromitra euzonata =

Scientific classification
- Kingdom: Animalia
- Phylum: Mollusca
- Class: Gastropoda
- Subclass: Caenogastropoda
- Order: Neogastropoda
- Family: Costellariidae
- Genus: Austromitra
- Species: A. euzonata

Binomial name
- Austromitra euzonata Sowerby III, 1900

Synonyms
- Microvoluta euzonata (G. B. Sowerby III, 1900); Mitra euzonata G. B. Sowerby III, 1900

Species of gastropod

Austromitra euzonata is a species of small sea snail, marine gastropod mollusk in the family Costellariidae, the ribbed miters.
