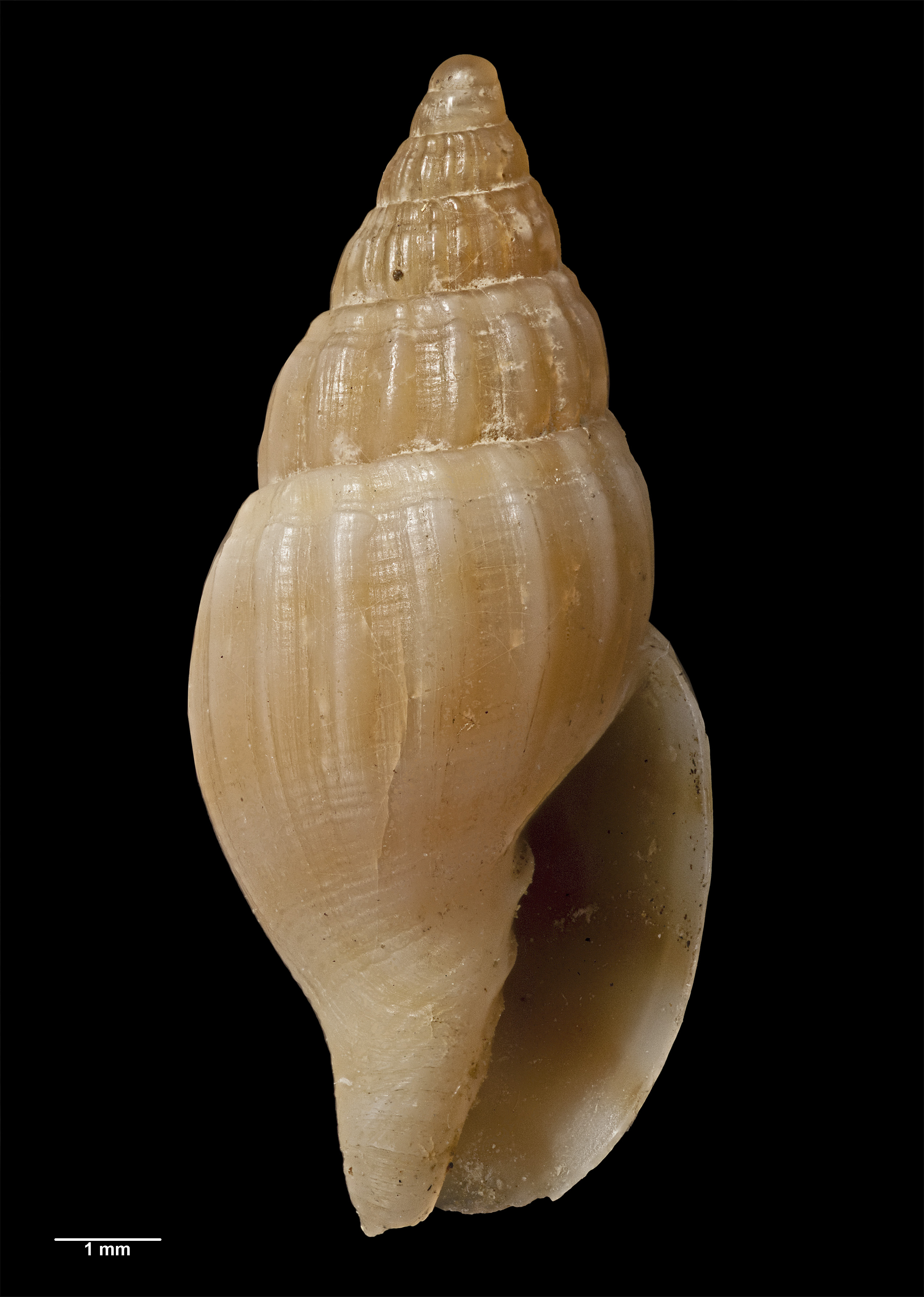
- Specimen from the Auckland War Memorial Museum

Scientific classification
- Kingdom: Animalia
- Phylum: Mollusca
- Class: Gastropoda
- Subclass: Caenogastropoda
- Order: Neogastropoda
- Family: Costellariidae
- Genus: Austromitra
- Species: A. planata

Binomial name
- Austromitra planata (Hutton, 1885)

Synonyms
- Austromitra brunneacincta Powell, 1952; Austromitra planatella Finlay, 1930; † Turricula planata Hutton, 1885

= Austromitra planata =

Species of gastropod

Austromitra planata is a species of sea snail, a marine gastropod mollusk, in the family Costellariidae, the ribbed miters.

== Distribution ==
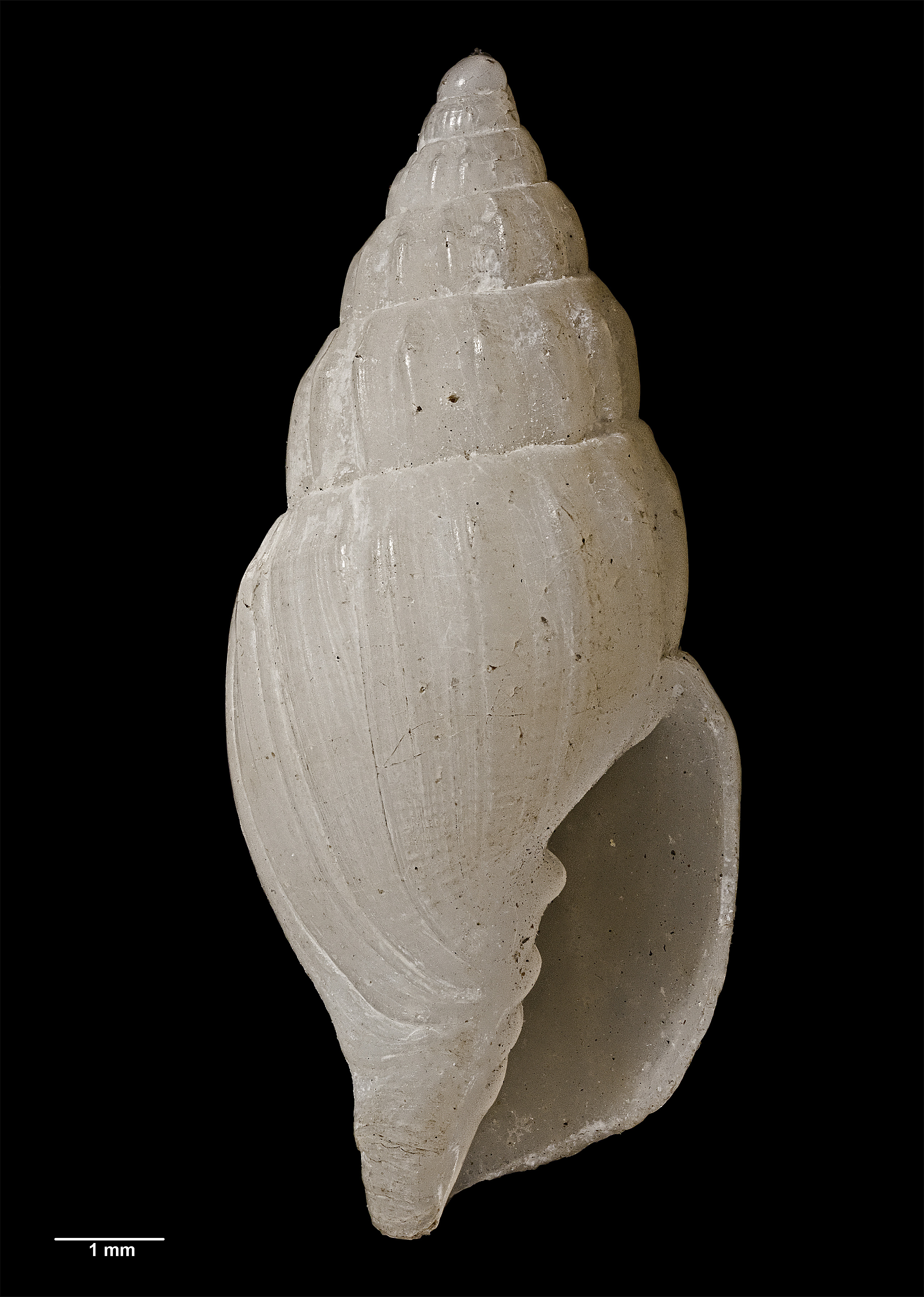
Alternate specimen

This species occurs in New Zealand Exclusive Economic Zone.
