= Austromitra rubiginosa =

Scientific classification
- Kingdom: Animalia
- Phylum: Mollusca
- Class: Gastropoda
- Subclass: Caenogastropoda
- Order: Neogastropoda
- Family: Costellariidae
- Genus: Austromitra
- Species: A. rubiginosa

Binomial name
- Austromitra rubiginosa (Hutton, 1873)

Synonyms
- Austromitra erecta Powell, 1934; Austromitra rubiradix Finlay, 1926; Columbella (Atilia) rubiginosa Hutton, 1873 (basionym); Columbella rubiginosa Hutton, 1873 (original combination); Vexillum antipodum Brookes, 1926; Vexillum pseudomarginatum Suter, 1913

Species of gastropod

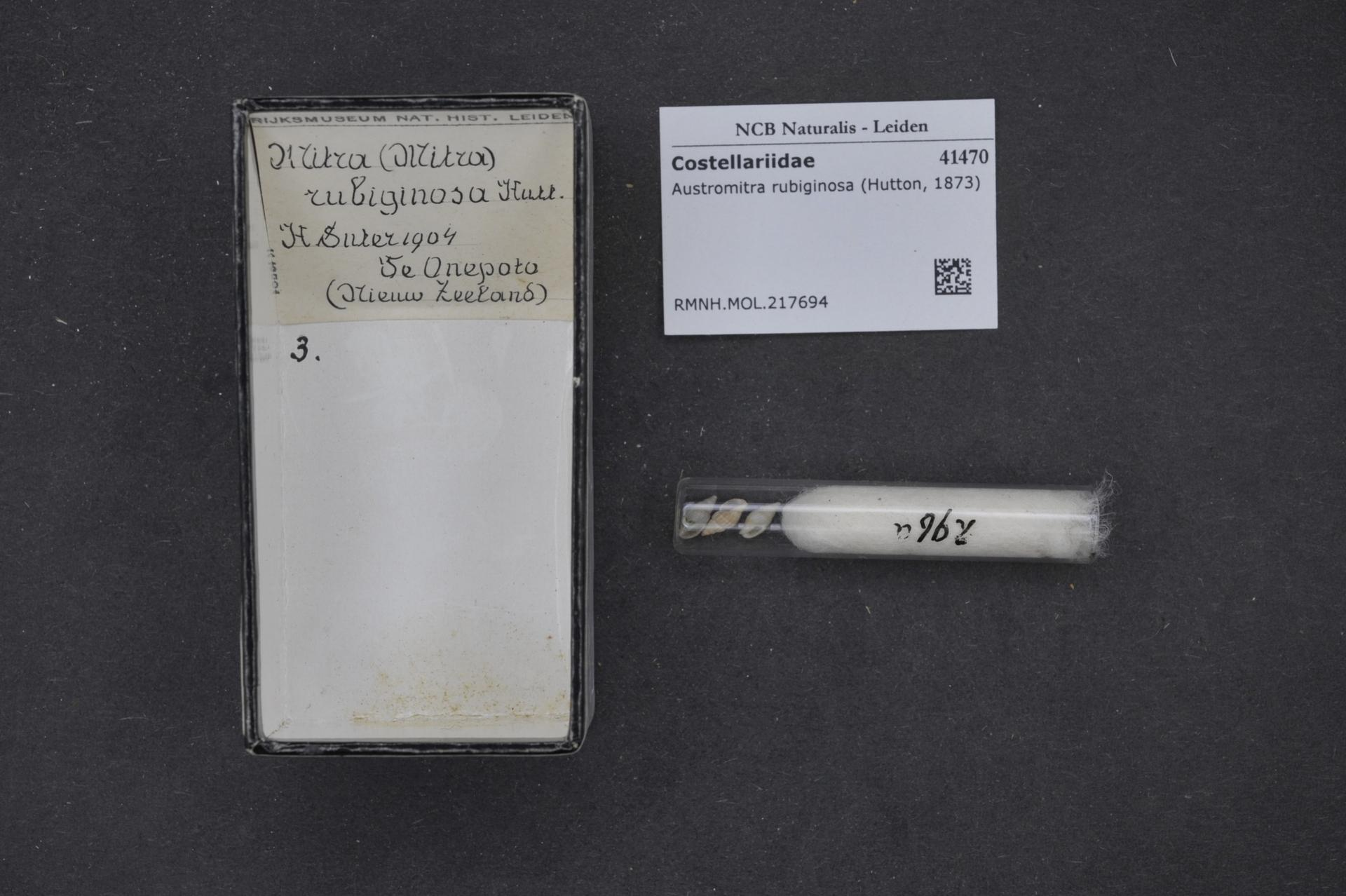

Austromitra rubiginosa is a species of small sea snail, marine gastropod mollusk in the family Costellariidae, the ribbed miters.
