= Cernohorskyola scita =

Scientific classification
- Kingdom: Animalia
- Phylum: Mollusca
- Class: Gastropoda
- Subclass: Caenogastropoda
- Order: Neogastropoda
- Family: Costellariidae
- Genus: Cernohorskyola
- Species: C. scita

Binomial name
- Cernohorskyola scita (Tenison Woods, 1876)

Synonyms
- Mitra scita Tenison Woods, 1876 superseded combination

Species of gastropod

Cernohorskyola scita is a species of small sea snail, marine gastropod mollusk in the family Costellariidae, the ribbed miters.

== Description ==
The length of the shell attains 8 mm; its diameter 3.5 mm.

(Original description) The shell is small, ovate, and glossy, and it is entirely of a deep, pure brown color. The spire is obtusely rounded, with a mamillated apex. It consists of six smooth and swollen whorls, separated by a finely impressed suture. The aperture is rather wide and brown within, and it is lirate internally. The columella bears three folds.

== Distribution ==
This marine species is endemic to Australia and occurs in the Southeast Australian Shelf.
