= Turricostellaria leonardhilli =

Scientific classification
- Kingdom: Animalia
- Phylum: Mollusca
- Class: Gastropoda
- Subclass: Caenogastropoda
- Order: Neogastropoda
- Superfamily: Turbinelloidea
- Family: Costellariidae
- Genus: Turricostellaria
- Species: T. leonardhilli

Binomial name
- Turricostellaria leonardhilli Petuch, 1987

Synonyms
- Vexillum leonardhilli (Petuch, 1987)

Species of gastropod

Turricostellaria leonardhilli is a species of sea snail, a marine gastropod mollusk, in the family Costellariidae, the ribbed miters.

== Description ==
Original description: "General shell form as for genus; shell shiny, polished, without spiral beads; color white with orange bands around mid-body; shoulder rounded; axial ribs low, rounded."

== Distribution ==
Locus typicus: "Off Punto Fijo, Paraguana Peninsula, Gulf of Venezuela, Venezuela."
