= Austromitra sansibarica =

Scientific classification
- Kingdom: Animalia
- Phylum: Mollusca
- Class: Gastropoda
- Subclass: Caenogastropoda
- Order: Neogastropoda
- Family: Costellariidae
- Genus: Austromitra
- Species: A. sansibarica

Binomial name
- Austromitra sansibarica (Thiele, 1925)

Species of gastropod

Austromitra sansibarica is a species of sea snail, a marine gastropod mollusk, in the family Costellariidae, the ribbed miters.
