= Ponderiola =

Scientific classification
- Kingdom: Animalia
- Phylum: Mollusca
- Class: Gastropoda
- Subclass: Caenogastropoda
- Order: Neogastropoda
- Superfamily: Turbinelloidea
- Family: Costellariidae
- Genus: Ponderiola; Fedosov, Bouchet, Dekkers, Gori, S.-I Huang, Kantor, Lemarcis, Marrow, Ratti, Rosenberg, R. Salisbury, Zvonareva & Puillandre, 2025

Type species
- Mitra (Costellaria) nitidissima Melvill & Standen, 1895

Genus of gastropods

Ponderiola is a genus of small to medium-sized sea snails, marine gastropod molluscs in the family Costellariidae.

== Etymology ==
This genus is named after Winston Ponder, who has contributed immensely to the knowledge of systematics and evolution of molluscs.

== Species ==
- Ponderiola koumacensis (Herrmann, R. Salisbury & J. C. Martin, 2019)
- Ponderiola nitidissima (Melvill & Standen, 1895)
