= Austromitra kowieensis =

Scientific classification
- Kingdom: Animalia
- Phylum: Mollusca
- Class: Gastropoda
- Subclass: Caenogastropoda
- Order: Neogastropoda
- Family: Costellariidae
- Genus: Austromitra
- Species: A. kowieensis

Binomial name
- Austromitra kowieensis (Sowerby III, 1901)

Synonyms
- Mitra becki Turton, 1933; Mitra eucosmia Turton, 1932

Species of gastropod

Austromitra kowieensis is a species of small sea snail, marine gastropod mollusk in the family Costellariidae, the ribbed miters.
