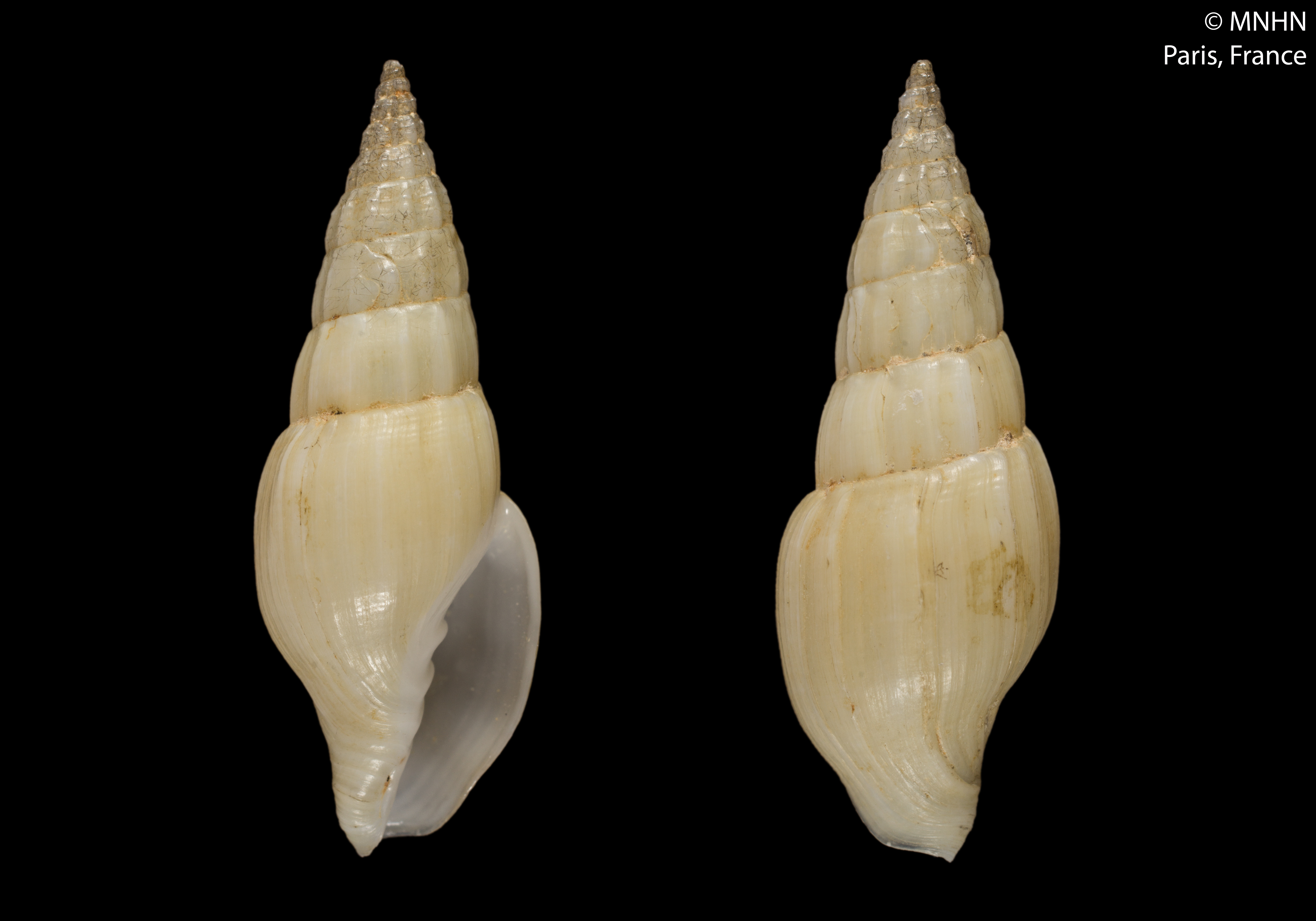
- Turricostellaria apyrahi

Scientific classification
- Kingdom: Animalia
- Phylum: Mollusca
- Class: Gastropoda
- Subclass: Caenogastropoda
- Order: Neogastropoda
- Superfamily: Turbinelloidea
- Family: Costellariidae
- Genus: Turricostellaria; Petuch, 1987

= Turricostellaria =

Genus of gastropods

Turricostellaria is a genus of sea snails, marine gastropod mollusks, in the family Costellariidae, the ribbed miters.

== Species ==
Species within the genus Turricostellaria include:

- Turricostellaria amphissa Simone & Cunha, 2012
- Turricostellaria apyrahi Simone & Cunha, 2012
- Turricostellaria jukyry Simone & Cunha, 2012
- Turricostellaria leonardhilli Petuch, 1987
- Turricostellaria lindae Petuch, 1987
- Turricostellaria ovir Simone & Cunha, 2012
