= Austromitra ambulacrum =

Scientific classification
- Kingdom: Animalia
- Phylum: Mollusca
- Class: Gastropoda
- Subclass: Caenogastropoda
- Order: Neogastropoda
- Family: Costellariidae
- Genus: Austromitra
- Species: †A. ambulacrum

Binomial name
- †Austromitra ambulacrum (Marwick, 1926)

Synonyms
- † Vexillum ambulacrum Marwick, 1926

Extinct species of gastropod

Austromitra ambulacrum is an extinct species of sea snail, a marine gastropod mollusk, in the family Costellariidae, the ribbed miters.

== Distribution ==
This species occurs in New Zealand.
