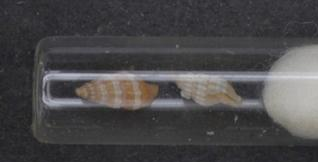

Scientific classification
- Kingdom: Animalia
- Phylum: Mollusca
- Class: Gastropoda
- Subclass: Caenogastropoda
- Order: Neogastropoda
- Family: Costellariidae
- Genus: Austromitra
- Species: A. legrandi

Binomial name
- Austromitra legrandi (Tenison-Woods, 1876)

Synonyms
- Mitra legrandi Tenison Woods, 1876; Mitroidea jaffaensis Cotton & Godfrey, 1932

= Austromitra legrandi =

Species of gastropod

Austromitra legrandi is a species of small sea snail, marine gastropod mollusk in the family Costellariidae, the ribbed miters.
