= Austromitra retrocurvata =

Scientific classification
- Kingdom: Animalia
- Phylum: Mollusca
- Class: Gastropoda
- Subclass: Caenogastropoda
- Order: Neogastropoda
- Family: Costellariidae
- Genus: Austromitra
- Species: A. retrocurvata

Binomial name
- Austromitra retrocurvata (Verco, 1909)

Synonyms
- Mitra retrocurvata Verco, 1909

Species of gastropod

Austromitra retrocurvata is a species of small sea snail, marine gastropod mollusc in the family Costellariidae, the ribbed miters.
