= Austromitra valarieae =

Scientific classification
- Kingdom: Animalia
- Phylum: Mollusca
- Class: Gastropoda
- Subclass: Caenogastropoda
- Order: Neogastropoda
- Family: Costellariidae
- Genus: Austromitra
- Species: A. valarieae

Binomial name
- Austromitra valarieae Lussi, 2015

Species of gastropod

Austromitra valarieae is a species of sea snail, a marine gastropod mollusk, in the family Costellariidae, the ribbed miters.

== Distribution ==
This species occurs in KwaZulu-Natal.
