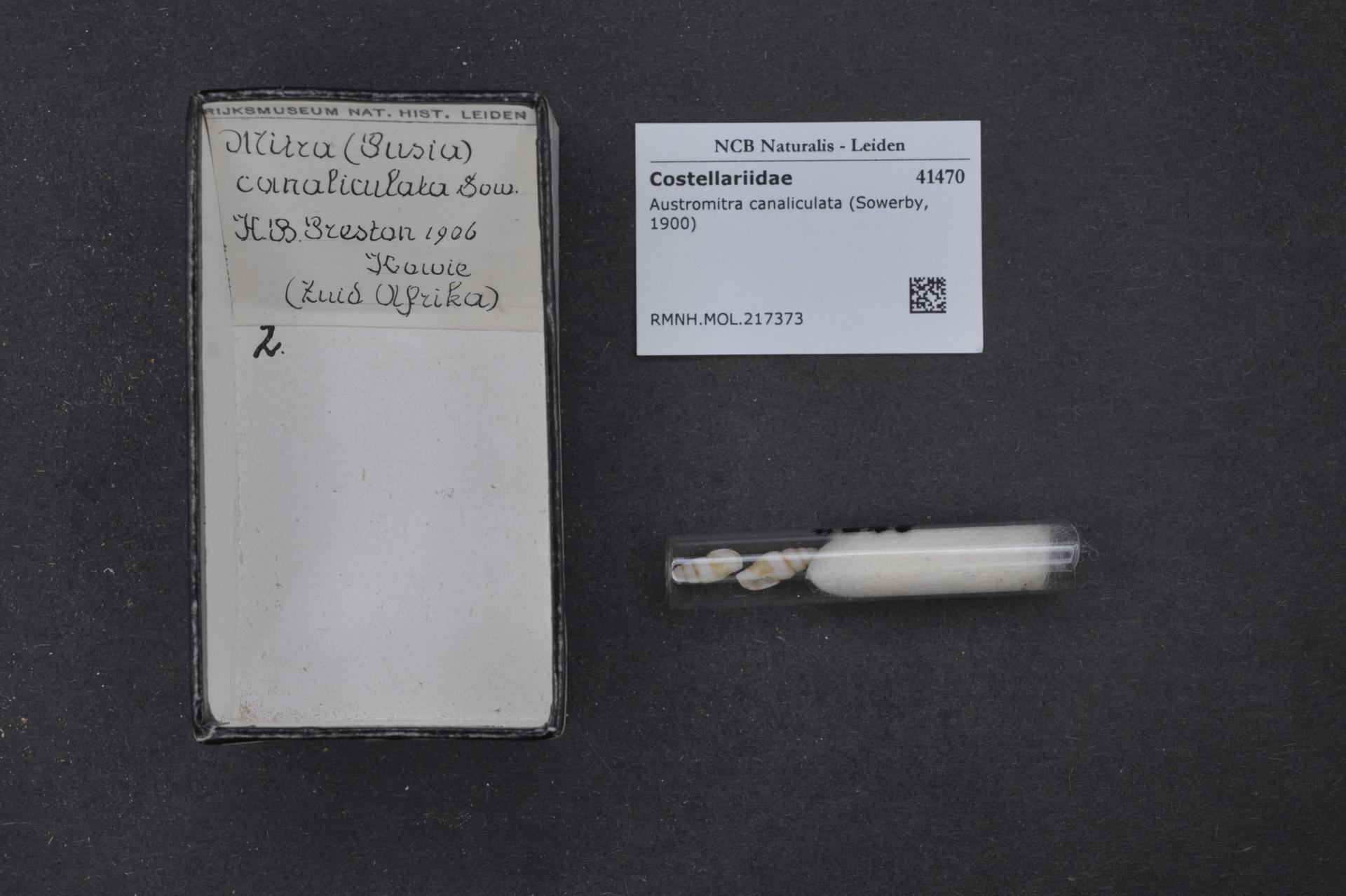

Scientific classification
- Kingdom: Animalia
- Phylum: Mollusca
- Class: Gastropoda
- Subclass: Caenogastropoda
- Order: Neogastropoda
- Family: Costellariidae
- Genus: Austromitra
- Species: A. canaliculata

Binomial name
- Austromitra canaliculata (Sowerby III, 1900)

= Austromitra canaliculata =

Species of gastropod

Austromitra canaliculata is a species of small sea snail, marine gastropod mollusc in the family Costellariidae, the ribbed miters.
