= Austromitra ralphi =

Scientific classification
- Kingdom: Animalia
- Phylum: Mollusca
- Class: Gastropoda
- Subclass: Caenogastropoda
- Order: Neogastropoda
- Superfamily: Turbinelloidea
- Family: Costellariidae
- Genus: Austromitra
- Species: A. ralphi

Binomial name
- Austromitra ralphi (Cossmann, 1900)

Synonyms
- † Mitra ralphi Cossmann, 1900; † Mitra semilaevis Tate, 1889 (not Edwards, 1856 (homonym)); † Mitra tatei Cossmann, 1899 (not Angas, 1879 (homonym)); † Turricula (Costellaria) tatei Cossmann, 1899

Species of gastropod

Austromitra ralphi is an extinct species of sea snail, a marine gastropod mollusk in the family Costellariidae.

== Distribution ==
Fossils of this marine species were found in Miocene strata in Victoria, Australia.
