= Cernohorskyola =

Scientific classification
- Kingdom: Animalia
- Phylum: Mollusca
- Class: Gastropoda
- Subclass: Caenogastropoda
- Order: Neogastropoda
- Superfamily: Turbinelloidea
- Family: Costellariidae
- Genus: Cernohorskyola; Fedosov, Bouchet, Dekkers, Gori, S.-I Huang, Kantor, Lemarcis, Marrow, Ratti, Rosenberg, R. Salisbury, Zvonareva & Puillandre, 2025

Type species
- Mitra analogica Reeve, 1845

Genus of gastropods

Cernohorskyola is a genus of small to medium-sized sea snails, marine gastropod molluscs in the family Costellariidae.

== Etymology ==
This genus is named after Walter Cernohorsky, who contributed immensely to our knowledge of Indo-Pacific molluscs, especially mitriforms.

== Species ==
- Cernohorskyola analogica (Reeve, 1845)
- Cernohorskyola grovei (Marrow & R. Salisbury, 2019)
- Cernohorskyola scita (Tenison Woods, 1876)
- Cernohorskyola volucra (Hedley, 1915)

== Distribution ==
These species are found in deep waters of the Pacific Ocean.
