= Austromitra distincta =

Scientific classification
- Kingdom: Animalia
- Phylum: Mollusca
- Class: Gastropoda
- Subclass: Caenogastropoda
- Order: Neogastropoda
- Family: Costellariidae
- Genus: Austromitra
- Species: A. distincta

Binomial name
- Austromitra distincta (Thiele, 1925)

Species of gastropod

Austromitra distincta is a species of small sea snail, marine gastropod mollusk in the family Costellariidae, the ribbed miters.
