= Austromitra cernohorskyi =

Scientific classification
- Kingdom: Animalia
- Phylum: Mollusca
- Class: Gastropoda
- Subclass: Caenogastropoda
- Order: Neogastropoda
- Family: Costellariidae
- Genus: Austromitra
- Species: A. cernohorskyi

Binomial name
- Austromitra cernohorskyi Turner, 2008

Species of gastropod

Austromitra cernohorskyi is a species of small sea snail, marine gastropod mollusc in the family Costellariidae, the ribbed miters.
