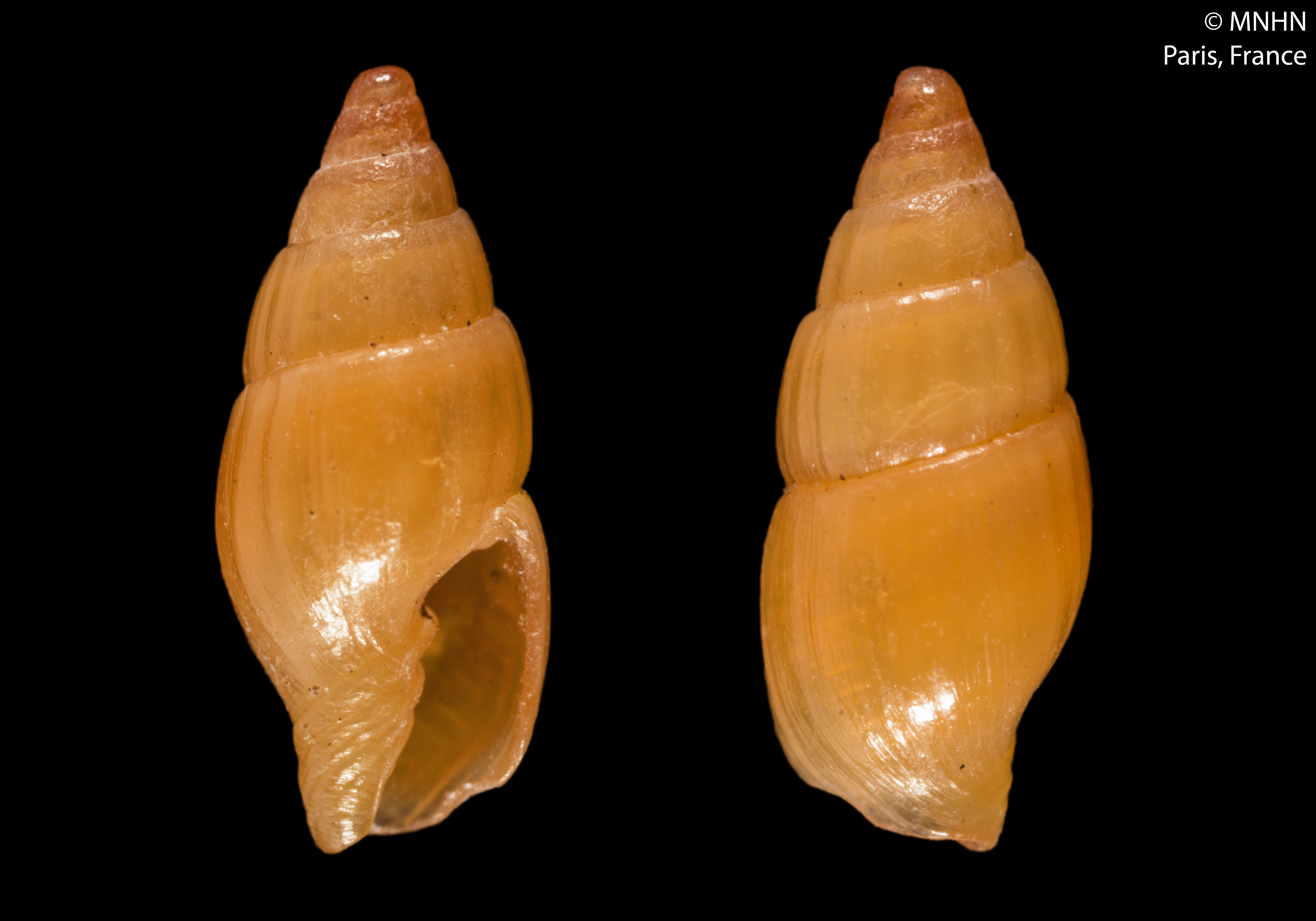
- Shell of Ponderiola nitidissima (syntype at MNHN, Paris)

Scientific classification
- Kingdom: Animalia
- Phylum: Mollusca
- Class: Gastropoda
- Subclass: Caenogastropoda
- Order: Neogastropoda
- Superfamily: Turbinelloidea
- Family: Costellariidae
- Genus: Ponderiola
- Species: P. nitidissima

Binomial name
- Ponderiola nitidissima (Melvill & Standen, 1895)

Synonyms
- Mitra (Costellaria) nitidissima Melvill & Standen, 1895 (basionym); Mitra (Volutomitra) nitidissima Melvill & Standen, 1895; Mitra (Volutomitra) nitidissima var. rubida Dautzenberg & Bouge, 1923; Mitra capricornea Hedley, 1907; Mitra nitidissima Melvill & Standen, 1895; Pusia nitidissimum (Melvill & Standen, 1895); Vexillum (Pusia) nitidissimum (Melvill & Standen, 1895); Vexillum nitidissimum (Melvill & Standen, 1895) superseded combination

= Ponderiola nitidissima =

Species of gastropod

Ponderiola nitidissima is a species of small sea snail, marine gastropod mollusk in the family Costellariidae, the ribbed miters.

== Description ==
The length of the shell attains 9 mm, its diameter 1.5 mm.

(Original description) The very small shell is brown, very shining and smooth. The shell contains six, slightly ventricose whorls. It is longitudinally roundly costate. The aperture is oblong. The outer lip is slightly incrassate. The columella is four-plaited.

(Described as Mitra capricornea Hedley, 1907) The minute shell is slender, conical, solid. It contains five whorls, of which two compose the protoconch.

Colour: various shades of brown from chocolate to ochre, or lilac, usually monochrome, but sometimes with two narrow spiral dark lines on the upper whorls.

Sculpture: the protoconch is smooth, the remainder with broad, wave-like well spaced, radial ribs, about eleven to the whorl, which undulate the suture, continue from whorl to whorl and vanish on the base. The last third of the body whorl is without ribbing. The aperture is narrow, the columella quadruplicate, the folds diminishing rapidly in size downwards. There is a thick callus layer on the inner lip, a stout tubercle beneath the hook of the right insertion, about six deep-seated spiral lyrae on the parietal wall.

The form varies; some are stouter, others more slender.

== Distribution ==
This marine species occurs off the Philippines and off Lifou Island, New Caledonia; also off Australia (Queensland).
