= Kilburniola =

Scientific classification
- Kingdom: Animalia
- Phylum: Mollusca
- Class: Gastropoda
- Subclass: Caenogastropoda
- Order: Neogastropoda
- Superfamily: Turbinelloidea
- Family: Costellariidae
- Genus: Kilburniola; Fedosov, Bouchet, Dekkers, Gori, S.-I Huang, Kantor, Lemarcis, Marrow, Ratti, Rosenberg, R. Salisbury, Zvonareva & Puillandre, 2025

Type species
- Kilburniola sola Fedosov, Bouchet, Dekkers, Gori, S.-I Huang, Kantor, Lemarcis, Marrow, Ratti, Rosenberg, R. Salisbury, Zvonareva & Puillandre, 2025

Genus of gastropods

Kilburniola is a genus of small to medium-sized sea snails, marine gastropod molluscs in the family Costellariidae.

== Etymology ==
The genus is named after Richard 'Dick' Kilburn, who contributed to the knowledge of gastropod systematics and faunas in the south-west Indian Ocean.

== Species ==
- Kilburniola aikeni (Lussi, 2015)
- Kilburniola maculosa (H. Turner & Simone, 1998)
- Kilburniola sola Fedosov, Bouchet, Dekkers, Gori, S.-I Huang, Kantor, Lemarcis, Marrow, Ratti, Rosenberg, R. Salisbury, Zvonareva & Puillandre, 2025

== Distribution ==
The species of this genus occur in the south-west Indian Ocean.
