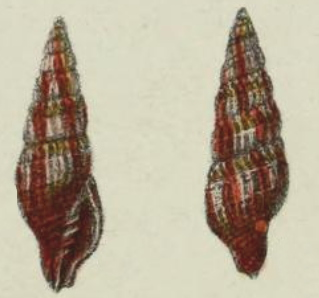
- Shell of Austromitra lincolnensis (holotype)

Scientific classification
- Kingdom: Animalia
- Phylum: Mollusca
- Class: Gastropoda
- Subclass: Caenogastropoda
- Order: Neogastropoda
- Superfamily: Turbinelloidea
- Family: Costellariidae
- Genus: Austromitra
- Species: A. lincolnensis

Binomial name
- Austromitra lincolnensis (Angas, 1878)

Synonyms
- Mitra lincolnensis Angas, 1878; Vexillum (Costellaria) lincolnensis (Angas, 1878); Vexillum lincolnense (Angas, 1878) superseded combination

= Austromitra lincolnensis =

Species of gastropod

Austromitra lincolnensis is a species of sea snail, a marine gastropod mollusk, in the family Costellariidae, the ribbed miters.

== Description ==
The length of the shell attains 13.4 mm.

The solid shell is acuminately fusiform. It is whitish, tinged with irregular longitudinal chestnut flames, with a narrow band of interrupted spots, encircling the centre of the whorls. The lower half of the body whorl is chestnut, with a faint band of reticulated brown and white spots in the middle. The shell contains seven whorls, a little convex with numerous, stout, rounded longitudinal ribs which are slightly nodulous below the sutures. The interstices are smooth. The sutures are impressed. The spire is longer than the aperture. The outer lip is simple and a little contracted below. The columella has four strong plaits, the posterior one the largest. The siphonal canal is short and slightly recurved.

== Distribution ==
This marine species is endemic to Australia and occurs off South Australia and Western Australia.
