= Turricostellaria lindae =

Scientific classification
- Kingdom: Animalia
- Phylum: Mollusca
- Class: Gastropoda
- Subclass: Caenogastropoda
- Order: Neogastropoda
- Superfamily: Turbinelloidea
- Family: Costellariidae
- Genus: Turricostellaria
- Species: T. lindae

Binomial name
- Turricostellaria lindae Petuch, 1987

Synonyms
- Vexillum (Costellaria) lindae (Petuch, 1987)

Species of gastropod

Turricostellaria lindae is a species of sea snail, a marine gastropod mollusk, in the family Costellariidae, the ribbed miters.

== Description ==
Original description: "General shell form as for genus; suture very incised, with squared-off subsutural band producing extreme tabulate appearance; spire scalariform; whorls with narrow, well-defined axial ribs; axial ribs overlaid, on body whorl, with 6 spiral impressed sulci and numerous fine spiral threads; color pale grayish-white."

== Distribution ==
Locus typicus: "Off Cabo La Vela, Goajira Peninsula, Colombia."
