= Austromitra lawsi =

Scientific classification
- Kingdom: Animalia
- Phylum: Mollusca
- Class: Gastropoda
- Subclass: Caenogastropoda
- Order: Neogastropoda
- Family: Costellariidae
- Genus: Austromitra
- Species: A. lawsi

Binomial name
- Austromitra lawsi Finlay, 1930

Species of gastropod

Austromitra lawsi is a species of small sea snail, marine gastropod mollusk in the family Costellariidae, the ribbed miters.

The species was described by H. J. Finlay in 1930 from New Zealand specimens.
