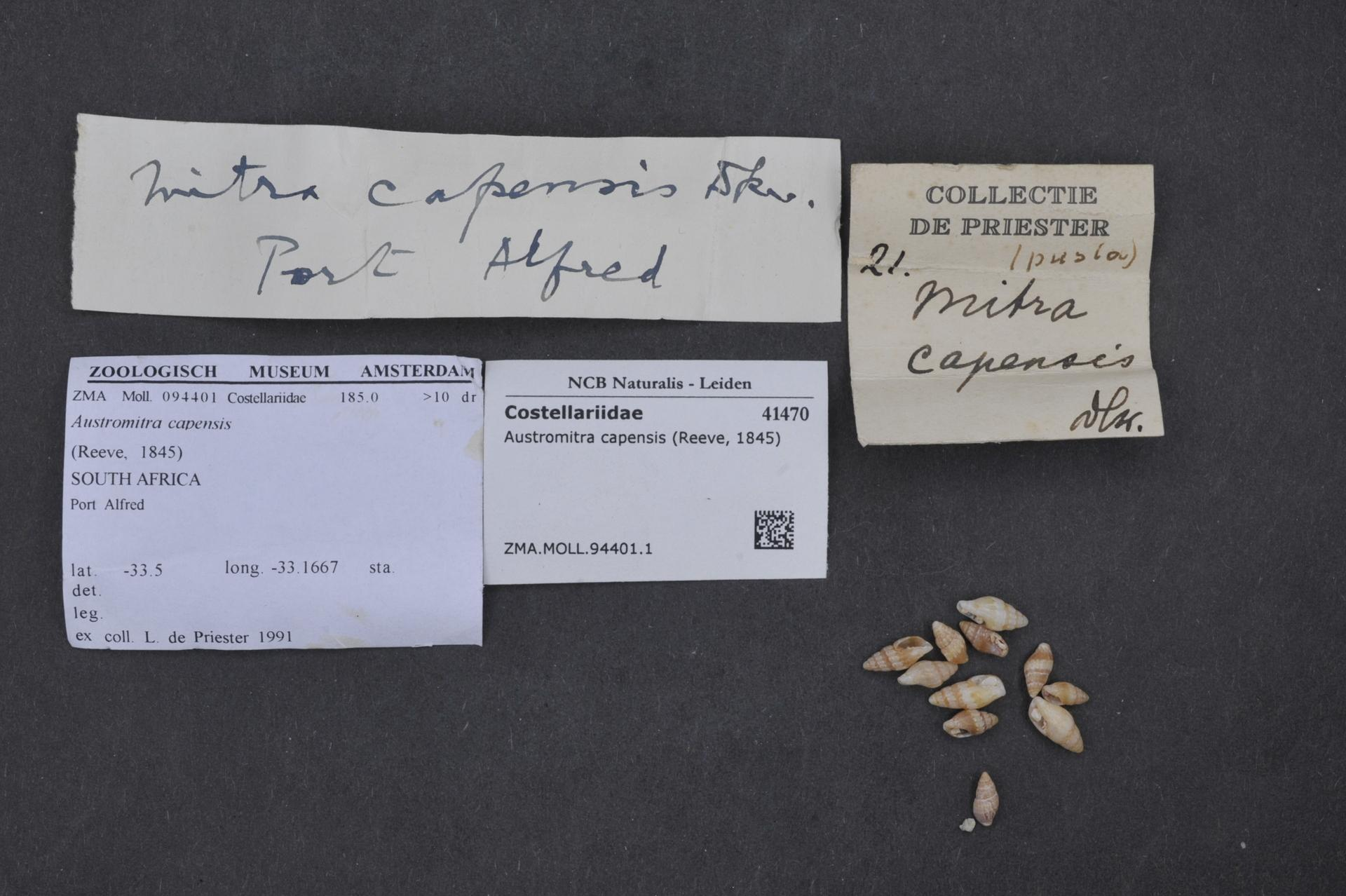

Scientific classification
- Kingdom: Animalia
- Phylum: Mollusca
- Class: Gastropoda
- Subclass: Caenogastropoda
- Order: Neogastropoda
- Family: Costellariidae
- Genus: Austromitra
- Species: A. capensis

Binomial name
- Austromitra capensis (Reeve, 1845)

Synonyms
- Austromitra ima (Bartsch, 1915); Mitra albanyana Turton, 1932; Mitra capensis Reeve, 1845 (original combination); Mitra hera W. H. Turton, 1932; Mitra ima Bartsch, 1915 (original combination)

= Austromitra capensis =

Species of gastropod

Austromitra capensis is a species of small sea snail, marine gastropod mollusc in the family Costellariidae, the ribbed miters.
