= Austromitra tasmanica =

Scientific classification
- Kingdom: Animalia
- Phylum: Mollusca
- Class: Gastropoda
- Subclass: Caenogastropoda
- Order: Neogastropoda
- Family: Costellariidae
- Genus: Austromitra
- Species: A. tasmanica

Binomial name
- Austromitra tasmanica (Tenison-Woods, 1876)

Synonyms
- Austromitra bucklandi Gabriel, 1962; Austromitra bucklandi bassiana Gabriel, 1962; Mitra cericosta Laseron, 1951; Mitra tasmanica Tenison Woods, 1876

Species of gastropod

Austromitra tasmanica is a species of small sea snail, marine gastropod mollusk in the family Costellariidae, the ribbed miters.
