= Austromitra arnoldi =

Scientific classification
- Kingdom: Animalia
- Phylum: Mollusca
- Class: Gastropoda
- Subclass: Caenogastropoda
- Order: Neogastropoda
- Family: Costellariidae
- Genus: Austromitra
- Species: A. arnoldi

Binomial name
- Austromitra arnoldi (Verco, 1909)

Species of gastropod

Austromitra arnoldi is a species of small sea snail, marine gastropod mollusc in the family Costellariidae, the ribbed miters.
