= Austromitra schomburgki =

Scientific classification
- Kingdom: Animalia
- Phylum: Mollusca
- Class: Gastropoda
- Subclass: Caenogastropoda
- Order: Neogastropoda
- Family: Costellariidae
- Genus: Austromitra
- Species: A. schomburgki

Binomial name
- Austromitra schomburgki (Angas, 1878)

Synonyms
- Mitra scalariformis Tenison Woods, 1876; Mitra schomburgki Angas, 1878; Vexillum pumilio May 1916

Species of gastropod

The Austromitra schomburgki (Angas, 1878)

Austromitra schomburgki is a species of small sea snail, marine gastropod mollusk in the family Costellariidae, the ribbed miters.
