= Austromitra hayesi =

Scientific classification
- Kingdom: Animalia
- Phylum: Mollusca
- Class: Gastropoda
- Subclass: Caenogastropoda
- Order: Neogastropoda
- Family: Costellariidae
- Genus: Austromitra
- Species: A. hayesi

Binomial name
- Austromitra hayesi Turner, 1999

Species of gastropod

Austromitra hayesi is a species of small sea snail, marine gastropod mollusk in the family Costellariidae, the ribbed miters.
