= Kilburniola maculosa =

Scientific classification
- Kingdom: Animalia
- Phylum: Mollusca
- Class: Gastropoda
- Subclass: Caenogastropoda
- Order: Neogastropoda
- Family: Costellariidae
- Genus: Kilburniola
- Species: K. maculosa

Binomial name
- Kilburniola maculosa (Turner & Simone, 1997)

Species of gastropod

Kilburniola maculosa is a species of small sea snail, marine gastropod mollusk in the family Costellariidae, the ribbed miters.

== Description ==
The length of this species attains 13.4 mmm, its diameter 5.4 mm.

== Distribution ==
This species occurs at the west coast of the Cape Peninsula, South Atlantic Ocean.
