= Vexillum caudatum =

Scientific classification
- Kingdom: Animalia
- Phylum: Mollusca
- Class: Gastropoda
- Subclass: Caenogastropoda
- Order: Neogastropoda
- Superfamily: Turbinelloidea
- Family: Costellariidae
- Genus: Vexillum
- Species: †V. caudatum

Binomial name
- †Vexillum caudatum (Marwick, 1931)

Synonyms
- † Austromitra caudata Marwick, 1931; † Costellaria caudata (Marwick, 1931)

Extinct species of gastropod

Vexillum caudatum is an extinct species of sea snail, a marine gastropod mollusk, in the family Costellariidae, the ribbed miters.
