= Spiripockia =

Scientific classification
- Kingdom: Animalia
- Phylum: Mollusca
- Class: Gastropoda
- Subclass: Caenogastropoda
- Order: Littorinimorpha
- Superfamily: Truncatelloidea
- Family: Cochliopidae; Simone, 2012

Type species
- Spiripockia punctata Simone, 2012

Genus of gastropods

Spiripockia is a genus of land snails with an operculum, terrestrial troglobiont gastropod molluscs in the family Cochliopidae.

== Species ==
Spiripockia currently includes two species:

- Spiripockia punctata Simone, 2012
- Spiripockia umbraticola Simone & Salvador, 2021

== Ecology ==
Snails in the genus Spiripockia are troglobiont, which means they are small cave-dwelling animals that are adapted to dark environments.
