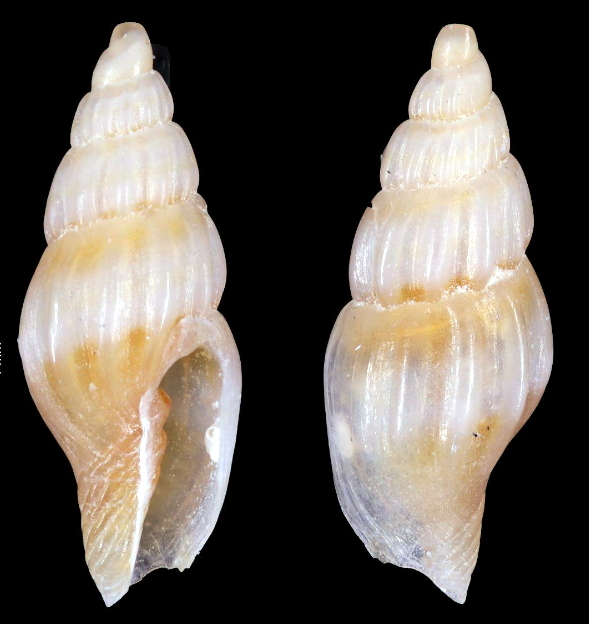
- Shell of Ponderiola koumacensis (holotype at MNHN, Paris)

Scientific classification
- Kingdom: Animalia
- Phylum: Mollusca
- Class: Gastropoda
- Subclass: Caenogastropoda
- Order: Neogastropoda
- Superfamily: Turbinelloidea
- Family: Costellariidae
- Genus: Ponderiola
- Species: P. koumacensis

Binomial name
- Ponderiola koumacensis (Herrmann, R. Salisbury & J. C. Martin, 2019)

Synonyms
- Austromitra koumacensis Herrmann, R. Salisbury & J. C. Martin, 2019 superseded combination

= Ponderiola koumacensis =

Species of gastropod

Ponderiola koumacensis is a species of small sea snail, marine gastropod mollusk in the family Costellariidae, the ribbed miters.

== Distribution ==
This marine species occurs off New Caledonia.
