= Calliostoma tupinamba =

Scientific classification
- Kingdom: Animalia
- Phylum: Mollusca
- Class: Gastropoda
- Subclass: Vetigastropoda
- Order: Trochida
- Family: Calliostomatidae
- Genus: Calliostoma
- Species: C. tupinamba

Binomial name
- Calliostoma tupinamba Dornellas, 2012

Synonyms
- Calliostoma ilhabelensis Prado, 2003 (nomen nudum); Calliostoma ilhabelense: Rosenberg 2009 (nomen nudum); Calliostoma jujubinum: Sá and Coelho 1986: 263–271; Rios 2009: 49 (fig. 105) (in; part; non Gmelin 1791).

Species of gastropod

Calliostoma tupinamba is a species of sea snail, a marine gastropod mollusc in the family Calliostomatidae.

== Distribution ==
This marine species is endemic to Southeastern Brazil.

== Description ==
The shell of this species can reach 38 mm in height with colors ranging from tawny brown to pinkish brown. The shell also has spot that range from white and dark red to purple with a purple apex and numerous white dots on the beads.
