= Kilburniola aikeni =

Scientific classification
- Kingdom: Animalia
- Phylum: Mollusca
- Class: Gastropoda
- Subclass: Caenogastropoda
- Order: Neogastropoda
- Family: Costellariidae
- Genus: Kilburniola
- Species: K. aikeni

Binomial name
- Kilburniola aikeni (Lussi, 2015)

Synonyms
- Austromitra aikeni Lussi, 2015 superseded combination

Species of gastropod

Kilburniola aikeni is a species of sea snail, a marine gastropod mollusk, in the family Costellariidae, the ribbed miters.

== Distribution ==
This species occurs in Port Alfred, South Africa.
