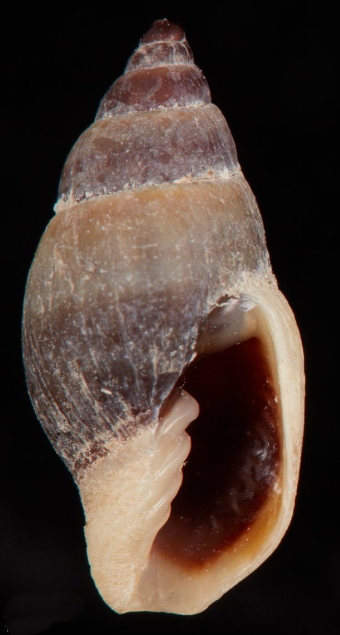
- Shell of Cernohorskyola grovei (specimen at MNHN, Paris)

Scientific classification
- Kingdom: Animalia
- Phylum: Mollusca
- Class: Gastropoda
- Subclass: Caenogastropoda
- Order: Neogastropoda
- Family: Costellariidae
- Genus: Cernohorskyola
- Species: C. grovei

Binomial name
- Cernohorskyola grovei (Marrow & R. Salisbury, 2019)

Synonyms
- Austromitra grovei Marrow & R. Salisbury, 2019 superseded combination

= Cernohorskyola grovei =

Species of gastropod

Cernohorskyola grovei, common name the analogous mitre, is a species of small sea snail, marine gastropod mollusc in the family Costellariidae, the ribbed miters.

== Description ==
The length of the shell attains 8.9 mm.

== Distribution ==
This marine snail is endemic to Australia and occurs off Tasmania.
