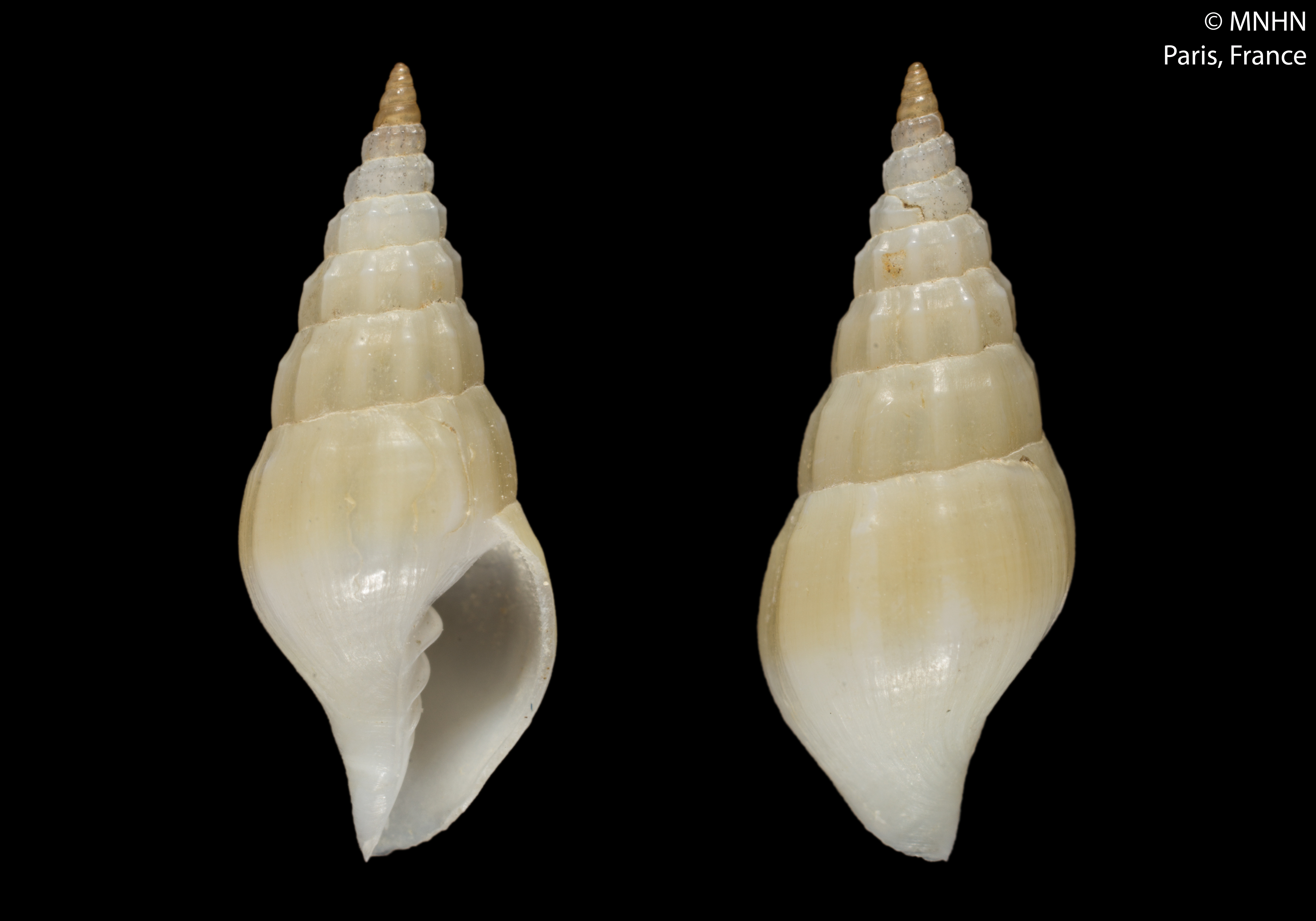
- Shell of Turricostellaria jukyry (holotype at MNHN, Paris)

Scientific classification
- Kingdom: Animalia
- Phylum: Mollusca
- Class: Gastropoda
- Subclass: Caenogastropoda
- Order: Neogastropoda
- Superfamily: Turbinelloidea
- Family: Costellariidae
- Genus: Turricostellaria
- Species: T. jukyry

Binomial name
- Turricostellaria jukyry Simone & Cunha, 2012

= Turricostellaria jukyry =

Species of gastropod

Turricostellaria jukyry is a species of sea snail, a marine gastropod mollusk, in the family Costellariidae, the ribbed miters.

== Distribution ==
This species occurs in the Atlantic Ocean off Southeast Brazil.
