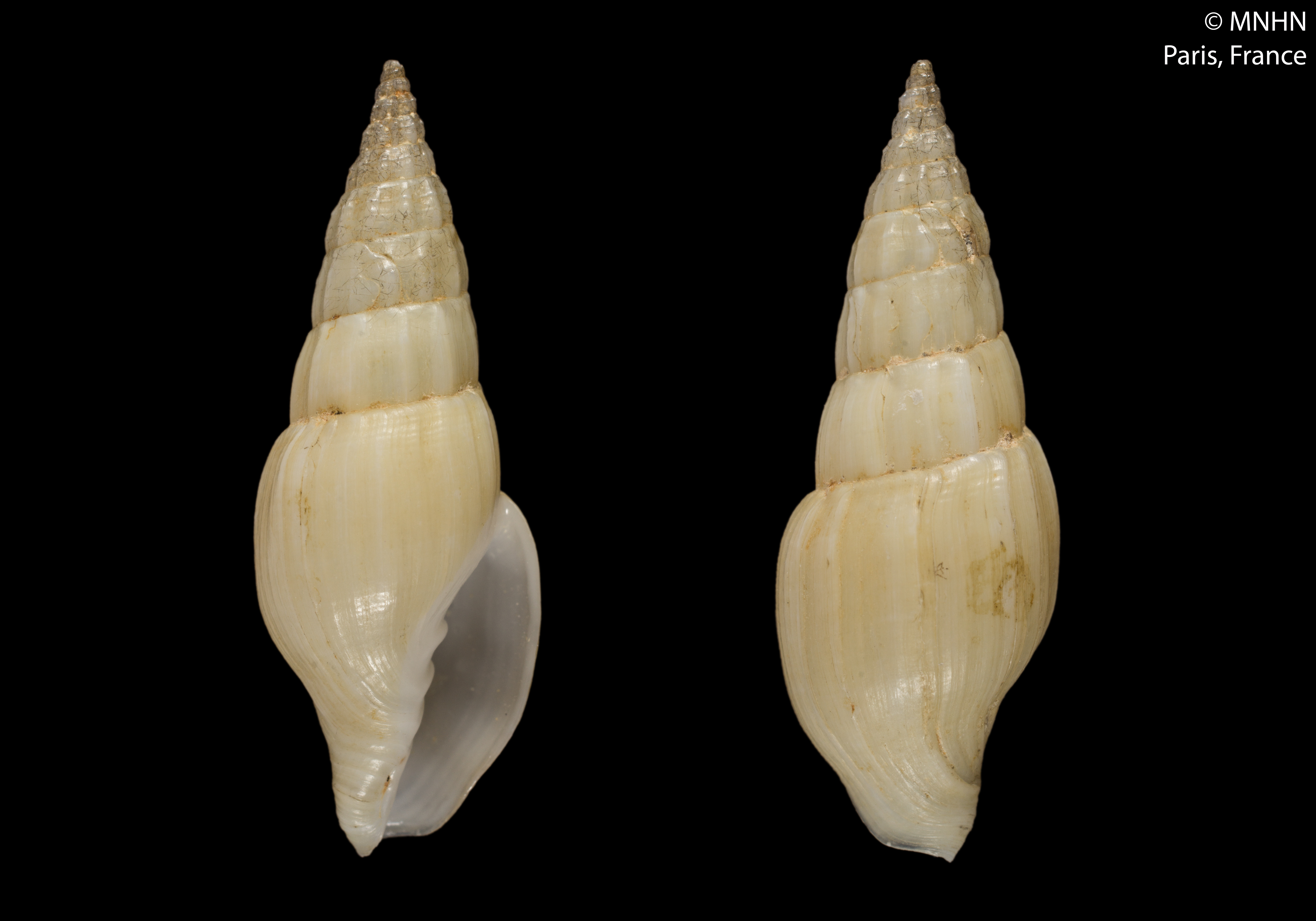
- Shell of Turricostellaria apyrahi (holotype at MNHN, Paris)

Scientific classification
- Kingdom: Animalia
- Phylum: Mollusca
- Class: Gastropoda
- Subclass: Caenogastropoda
- Order: Neogastropoda
- Superfamily: Turbinelloidea
- Family: Costellariidae
- Genus: Turricostellaria
- Species: T. apyrahi

Binomial name
- Turricostellaria apyrahi Simone & Cunha, 2012

= Turricostellaria apyrahi =

Species of gastropod

Turricostellaria apyrahi is a species of sea snail, a marine gastropod mollusk, in the family Costellariidae, the ribbed miters.

== Distribution ==
This species occurs in the Atlantic Ocean off Southeast Brazil.
