= Spiripockia punctata =

Scientific classification
- Kingdom: Animalia
- Phylum: Mollusca
- Class: Gastropoda
- Subclass: Caenogastropoda
- Order: Littorinimorpha
- Family: Cochliopidae
- Genus: Spiripockia
- Species: S. punctata

Binomial name
- Spiripockia punctata Simone, 2012

Species of land snail

Spiripockia punctata is a species of land snail with an operculum, a terrestrial troglobiont gastropod mollusk in the family Cochliopidae. S. punctata is the type species of the genus Spiripockia.

== Ecology ==
Spiripockia punctata is a troglobiont species, which means it is a small cave-dwelling animal that is adapted to its dark surroundings.
