= Adfacelina =

Scientific classification
- Kingdom: Animalia
- Phylum: Mollusca
- Class: Gastropoda
- Order: Nudibranchia
- Suborder: Aeolidacea
- Family: Facelinidae
- Genus: Adfacelina; Millen & Hermosillo, 2012
- Species: A. medinai

Binomial name
- Adfacelina medinai Millen & Hermosillo, 2012

Genus of gastropods

Adfacelina medinai is a species of sea slug, an aeolid nudibranch, a marine gastropod mollusc in the family Facelinidae. It is the only species in the genus Adfacelina.

== Distribution ==
This species was described from Islas Marietas, Bahía de Banderas, Mexico.
