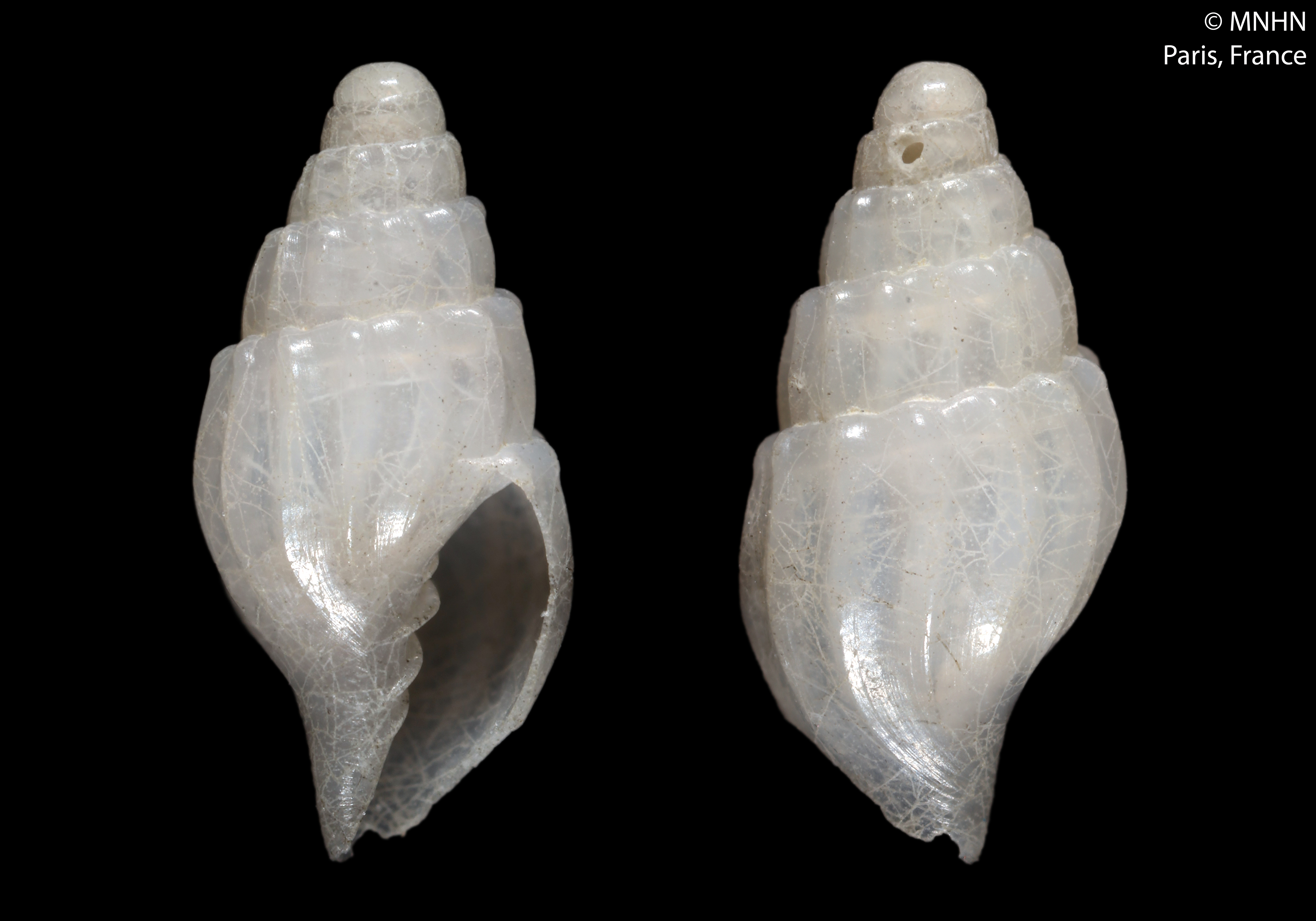
- Shell of Turricostellaria amphissa (holotype at MNHN, Paris)

Scientific classification
- Kingdom: Animalia
- Phylum: Mollusca
- Class: Gastropoda
- Subclass: Caenogastropoda
- Order: Neogastropoda
- Superfamily: Turbinelloidea
- Family: Costellariidae
- Genus: Turricostellaria
- Species: T. amphissa

Binomial name
- Turricostellaria amphissa Simone & Cunha, 2012

= Turricostellaria amphissa =

Species of gastropod

Turricostellaria amphissa is a species of sea snail, a marine gastropod mollusk, in the family Costellariidae, the ribbed miters.
