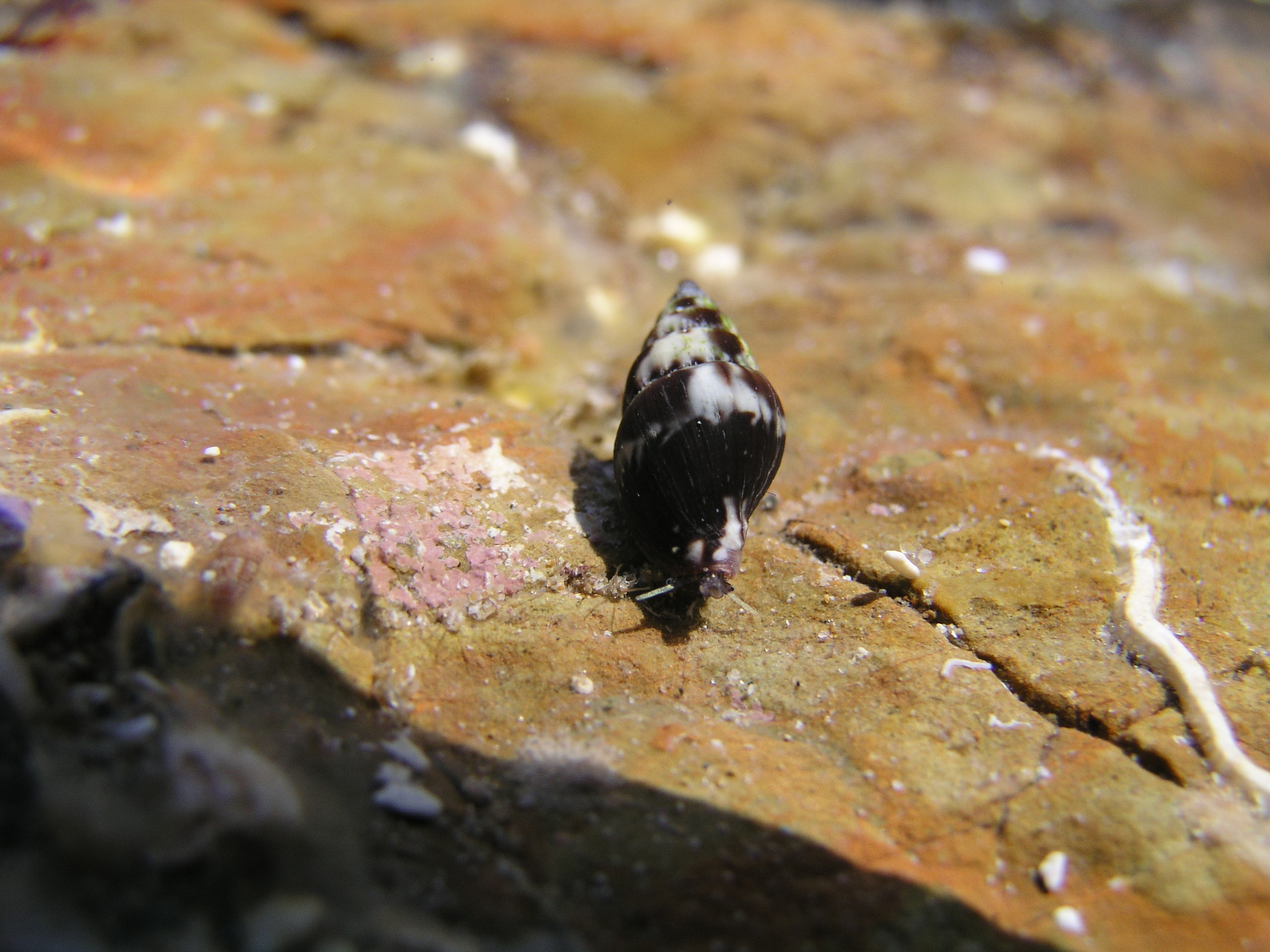

Scientific classification
- Kingdom: Animalia
- Phylum: Mollusca
- Class: Gastropoda
- Subclass: Caenogastropoda
- Order: Neogastropoda
- Family: Costellariidae
- Genus: Cernohorskyola
- Species: C. volucra

Binomial name
- Cernohorskyola volucra (Hedley, 1915)

Synonyms
- Austromitra volucra (Hedley, 1915) superseded combination; Mitra volucra Hedley, C. 1915

= Cernohorskyola volucra =

Species of gastropod

Cernohorskyola volucra is a species of small sea snail, marine gastropod mollusk in the family Costellariidae, the ribbed miters.

== Description ==
The length of the shell attains 11 mm; its diameter 5 mm.

The small, solid shell is compact and ovate-fusiform. Its colour is purple-slate or cinnamon, with a narrow pale peripheral band and a pale line below the suture. Five whorls remaining in the decollate specimen studied. The suture is channelled. The earlier whorls are sculptured by fine close radial riblets developed on the periphery and vanishing towards the suture. These disappear on the body whorl, which is smooth Between the riblets run spiral threads. The aperture is elliptical and shows four plaits, decreasing anteriorly. The siphonal canal is short.

== Distribution ==
This marine species is endemic to Australia and occurs off New South Wales and Queensland.
