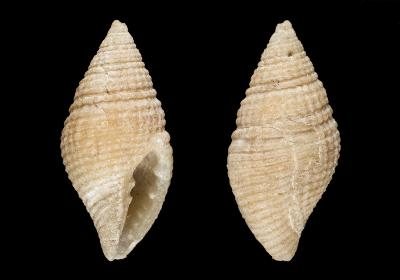
- Shell of Mitromorpha sama (holotype in MNHN, Paris)

Scientific classification
- Kingdom: Animalia
- Phylum: Mollusca
- Class: Gastropoda
- Subclass: Caenogastropoda
- Order: Neogastropoda
- Family: Mitromorphidae
- Genus: Mitromorpha
- Species: M. sama

Binomial name
- Mitromorpha sama Simone & Cunha, 2012

= Mitromorpha sama =

Species of gastropod

Mitromorpha sama is a species of sea snail, a marine gastropod mollusk in the family Mitromorphidae.

== Description ==
The length of the shell attains 6.6 mm.

== Distribution ==
This marine species occurs off Southeastern Brazil.
