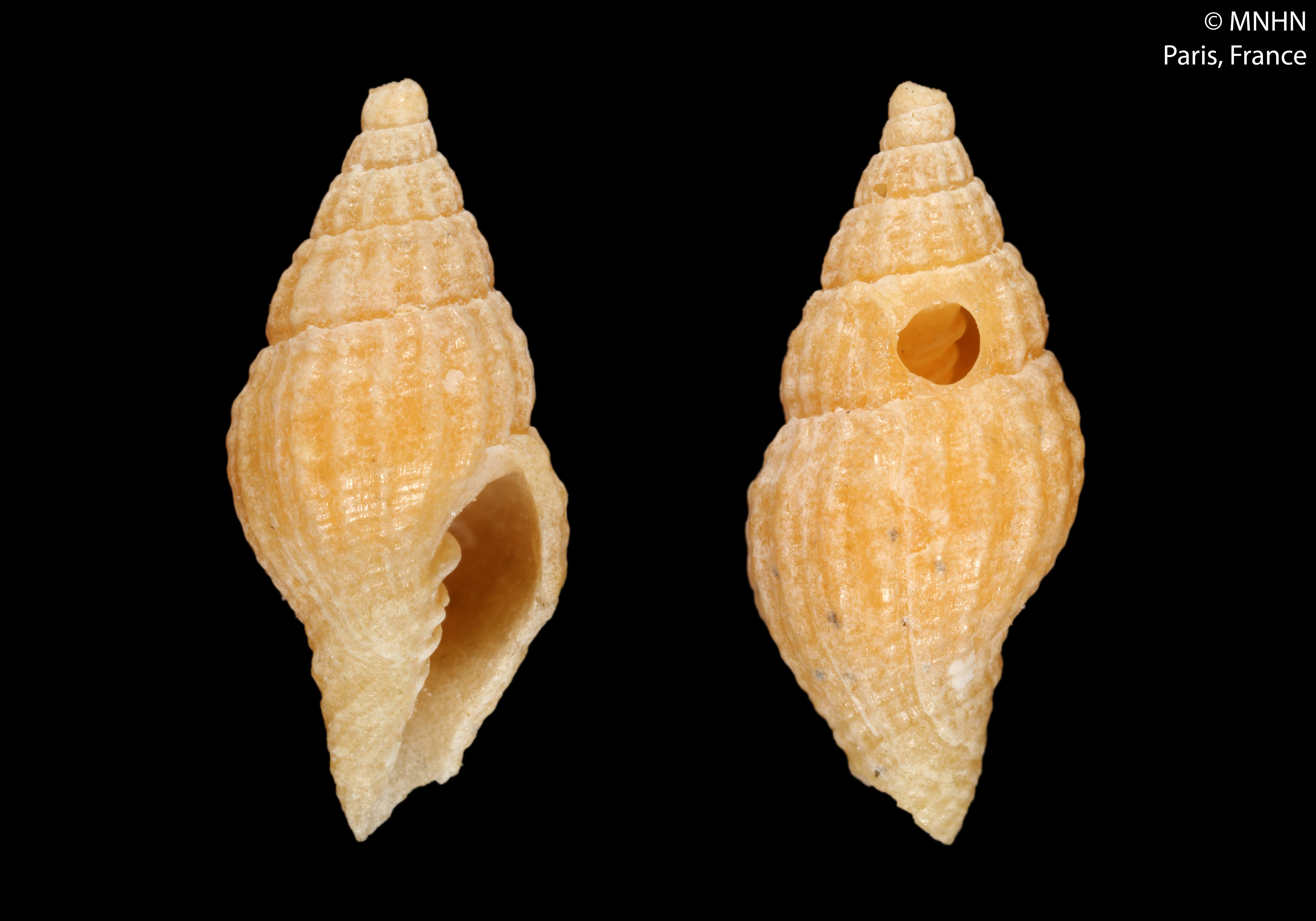
- Shell of Austromitra decresca (holotype at MNHN, Paris)

Scientific classification
- Kingdom: Animalia
- Phylum: Mollusca
- Class: Gastropoda
- Subclass: Caenogastropoda
- Order: Neogastropoda
- Family: Costellariidae
- Genus: Austromitra
- Species: A. decresca

Binomial name
- Austromitra decresca Simone & Cunha, 2012

= Austromitra decresca =

Species of gastropod

Austromitra decresca is a species of sea snail, a marine gastropod mollusk, in the family Costellariidae, the ribbed miters.

== Distribution ==
This marine species occurs off Southeast Brazil at a depth of 60–105 metres (197–344 ft).
