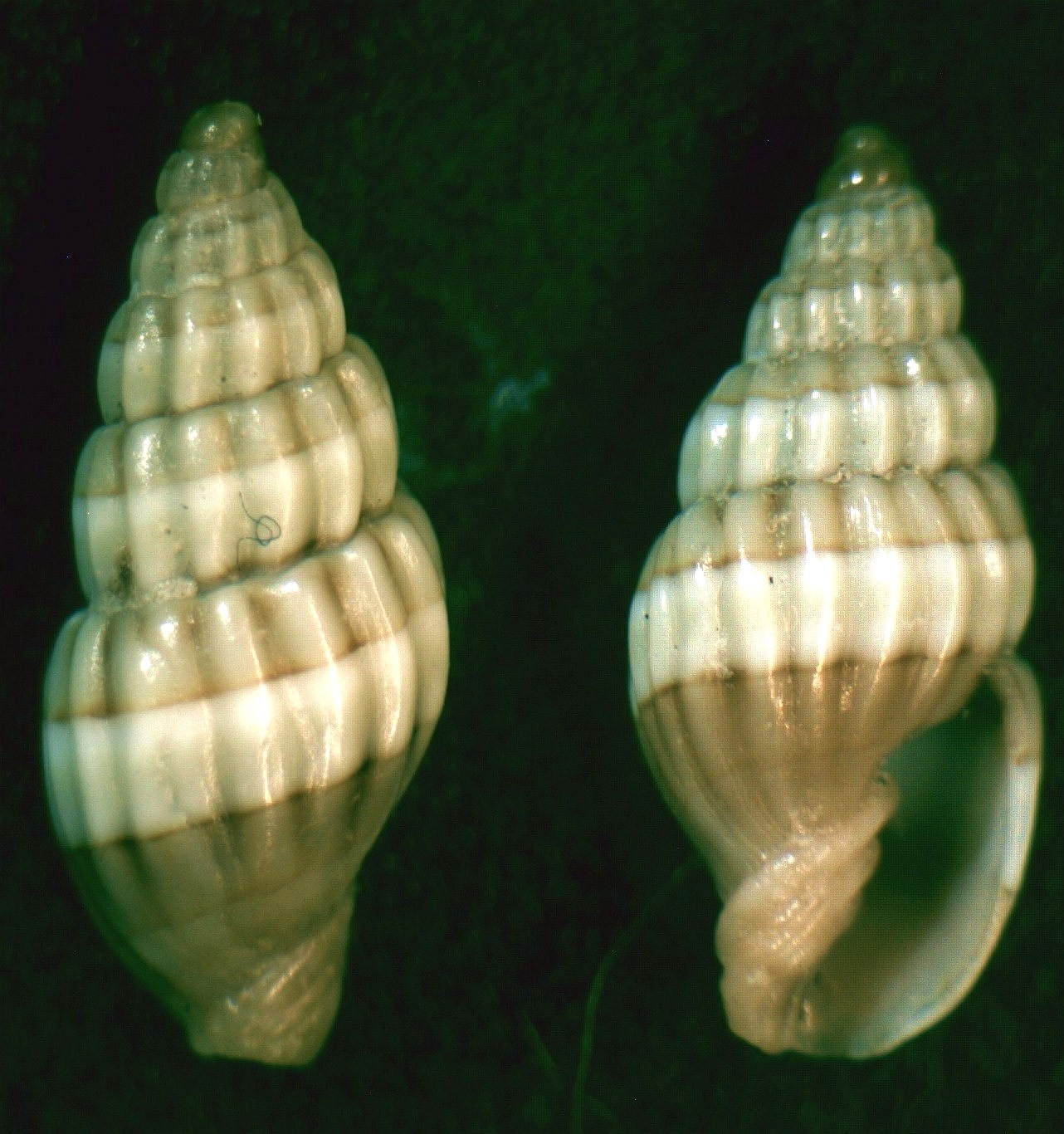
- Cernohorskyola analogica tatei

Scientific classification
- Kingdom: Animalia
- Phylum: Mollusca
- Class: Gastropoda
- Subclass: Caenogastropoda
- Order: Neogastropoda
- Family: Costellariidae
- Genus: Cernohorskyola
- Species: C. analogica

Binomial name
- Cernohorskyola analogica (Reeve, 1845)

Synonyms
- Austromitra analogica (Reeve, 1845) superseded combination; Mitra analogica Reeve, 1845; Mitra tatei Angas, 1879; Mitra teresiae Tenison-Woods, 1876; Mitra weldii Tenison-Woods, 1878; Volutomitra vincta Adams, 1855

= Cernohorskyola analogica =

Species of gastropod

Cernohorskyola analogica, common name the analogous mitre, is a species of small sea snail, marine gastropod mollusc in the family Costellariidae, the ribbed miters.

== Description ==
(Original description) The shell is ovately oblong and is contracted and grooved at the base. The whorls of the spire are ornamented with longitudinal, plicate ribs, while the body whorl is smooth. The shell is very dark brown in color and is encircled by a narrow yellow band. The columella bears three folds.

== Distribution ==
This snail is found under rocks and in algae from the intertidal zone to a depth of 570 m along the coasts from Southern Queensland down to the southeast and southern Australia and Tasmania.
