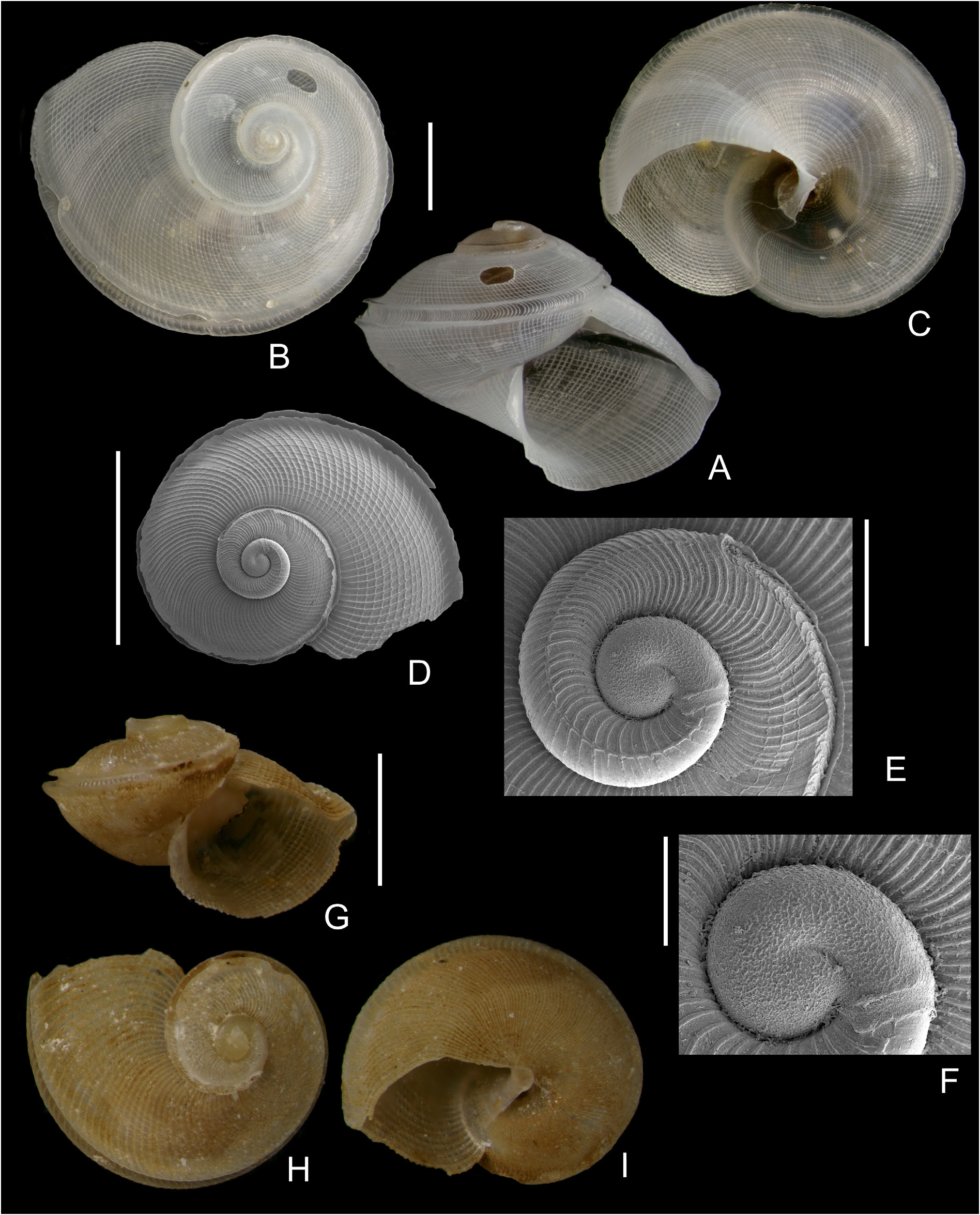
- Shell of Anatoma richardi (holotype)

Scientific classification
- Kingdom: Animalia
- Phylum: Mollusca
- Class: Gastropoda
- Subclass: Vetigastropoda
- Order: Lepetellida
- Superfamily: Scissurelloidea
- Family: Anatomidae
- Genus: Anatoma
- Species: A. richardi

Binomial name
- Anatoma richardi (Dautzenberg & H. Fischer, 1896)

Synonyms
- Scissurella richardi Dautzenberg & H. Fischer, 1896; Scissurella umbilicata var. depressa Locard, 1898

= Anatoma richardi =

Species of gastropod

Anatoma richardi is a species of small sea snail, a marine gastropod mollusc or micromollusc in the family Anatomidae.

This species was treated by D.L. Geiger (2012) as a synonym of Anatoma tenuis (Jeffreys, 1877) but this was rebutted by Ortega & Gofas (2019).

== Description ==
The length of the shell attains 2 2/5 mm, its diameter 3 1/5 mm.

(Original description in French) The shell is very thin and fragile. Its depressed spire comprises four low, rapidly enlarging whorls, which are slightly convex above and adorned with numerous, regular, slender longitudinal ribs. The upper part of the body whorl also features fine decurrent cords that, with the ribs, form a delicate and fine network. The body whorl is very large, deeply convex at the base, and profoundly umbilicated.

The fissural band, situated at the base of the whorls, is partially covered by the suture in the upper whorls. It is furnished with arched folds and limited above and below by prominent, lamellar edges. The fissure is very deep.

The aperture is very large and flared. The columella is arched and provided with a lamella that reflects over the umbilicus. The outer lip is arched, sharp, angular, emarginate, and rostrate at the point where the fissure terminates. The shell's coloration is a subhyaline white.

== Distribution ==
This marine species occurs in the Atlantic Ocean off The Azores
