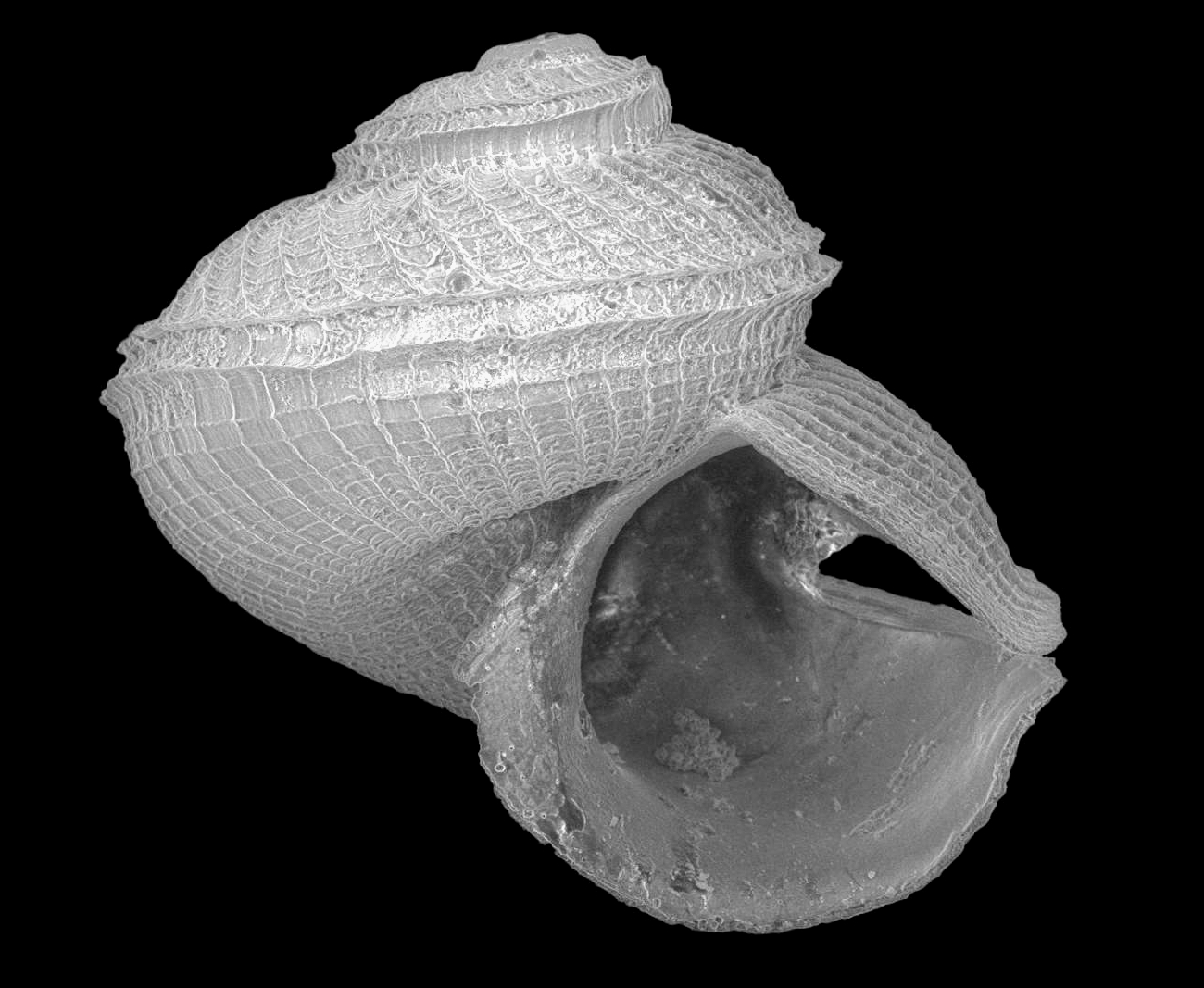
- Shell of Anatoma lamellata

Scientific classification
- Kingdom: Animalia
- Phylum: Mollusca
- Class: Gastropoda
- Subclass: Vetigastropoda
- Order: Lepetellida
- Superfamily: Scissurelloidea
- Family: Anatomidae
- Genus: Anatoma
- Species: A. lamellata

Binomial name
- Anatoma lamellata (A. Adams, 1862)

Synonyms
- Anatoma lamellata lamellata (A. Adams, 1862); Anatomus lamellatus A. Adams, 1862 (original combination); Schizotrochus lamellatus (A. Adams, 1862) superseded combination

= Anatoma lamellata =

Species of gastropod

Anatoma lamellata is a species of small sea snail, a marine gastropod mollusk or micromollusk in the family Anatomidae.

Subspecies

- Anatoma lamellata lamellata (A. Adams, 1862): synonym of Anatoma lamellata (A. Adams, 1862)
- Anatoma lamellata nanshaensis W.-M. Feng, 1996: synonym of Anatoma equatoria (Hedley, 1899)

== Description ==
The globose-conoidal shell grows to a height of 3.5 mm. The conical spire has 3½ whorls that are a little convex. They are cancellated with radiating, subdistant lamellae, and show elevated transverse lines in the interstices. The lamellae are flexuous on the base. The aperture is subcircular. The inner lip is dilated, angular and broadly reflexed in the middle. It partly covers the umbilicus.

== Distribution ==
This marine species occurs off Japan.
