= Anatoma rolani =

Scientific classification
- Kingdom: Animalia
- Phylum: Mollusca
- Class: Gastropoda
- Subclass: Vetigastropoda
- Order: Lepetellida
- Superfamily: Scissurelloidea
- Family: Anatomidae
- Genus: Anatoma
- Species: A. rolani

Binomial name
- Anatoma rolani Geiger & Fernández-Garcés, 2010

Species of gastropod

Anatoma rolani is a species of small sea snail, a marine gastropod mollusk or micromollusk in the family Anatomidae.

== Distribution ==
This species occurs in the Caribbean Sea off Cuba.
