= Anatoma austrolissa =

Scientific classification
- Kingdom: Animalia
- Phylum: Mollusca
- Class: Gastropoda
- Subclass: Vetigastropoda
- Order: Lepetellida
- Family: Anatomidae
- Genus: Anatoma
- Species: A. austrolissa

Binomial name
- Anatoma austrolissa Geiger & Sasaki, 2008

Species of gastropod

Anatoma austrolissa is a species of small sea snail, a marine gastropod mollusc or micromollusc in the family Anatomidae.

== Description ==
The length of the shell attains 2.85 mm.

== Distribution ==
This species occurs in the Indian Ocean (Réunion) to Indo-Malayan Archipelago to central Pacific (Fiji, Vanuatu); also off Australia (New South Wales).
