= Anatoma shiraseae =

Scientific classification
- Kingdom: Animalia
- Phylum: Mollusca
- Class: Gastropoda
- Subclass: Vetigastropoda
- Order: Lepetellida
- Family: Anatomidae
- Genus: Anatoma
- Species: A. shiraseae

Binomial name
- Anatoma shiraseae Numanami & Okutani, 1990

Species of gastropod

Anatoma shiraseae is a species of sea snail, a marine gastropod mollusk in the family Anatomidae.

== Description ==
The length of the shell reaches 4.2 mm.

== Distribution ==
This species occurs in Antarctic waters.
