= Anatoma sinuosa =

Scientific classification
- Kingdom: Animalia
- Phylum: Mollusca
- Class: Gastropoda
- Subclass: Vetigastropoda
- Order: Lepetellida
- Superfamily: Scissurelloidea
- Family: Anatomidae
- Genus: Anatoma
- Species: A. sinuosa

Binomial name
- Anatoma sinuosa Geiger, 2012

Species of gastropod

Anatoma sinuosa is a species of small sea snail, a marine gastropod mollusc or micromollusc in the family Anatomidae.

== Distribution ==
This species occurs in the Pacific Ocean off Chile.
