= Anatoma argentinae =

Scientific classification
- Kingdom: Animalia
- Phylum: Mollusca
- Class: Gastropoda
- Subclass: Vetigastropoda
- Order: Lepetellida
- Superfamily: Scissurelloidea
- Family: Anatomidae
- Genus: Anatoma
- Species: A. argentinae

Binomial name
- Anatoma argentinae (Zelaya & Geiger, 2007)

Synonyms
- Thieleella argentinae Zelaya & Geiger, 2007

Species of mollusc

Anatoma argentinae is a species of small sea snail, a marine gastropod mollusc or micromollusc in the family Anatomidae.

== Description ==
The length of the shell reaches 5 mm.

== Distribution ==
This marine species occurs in the Atlantic Ocean in the Argentine Basin.
