= Anatoma brychia =

Scientific classification
- Kingdom: Animalia
- Phylum: Mollusca
- Class: Gastropoda
- Subclass: Vetigastropoda
- Order: Lepetellida
- Family: Anatomidae
- Genus: Anatoma
- Species: A. brychia

Binomial name
- Anatoma brychia Pimenta & D. L. Geiger, 2015

Species of gastropod

Anatoma brychia is a species of sea snail, a marine gastropod mollusc in the family Anatomidae.

== Distribution ==
This species occurs in the Atlantic Ocean off Brazil.
