= Anatoma bathypacifica =

Scientific classification
- Kingdom: Animalia
- Phylum: Mollusca
- Class: Gastropoda
- Subclass: Vetigastropoda
- Order: Lepetellida
- Superfamily: Scissurelloidea
- Family: Anatomidae
- Genus: Anatoma
- Species: A. bathypacifica

Binomial name
- Anatoma bathypacifica (Geiger & McLean, 2010)

Synonyms
- Thieleella bathypacifica Geiger & McLean, 2010

Species of gastropod

Anatoma bathypacifica is a species of small sea snail, a marine gastropod mollusk or micromollusk in the family Anatomidae.
