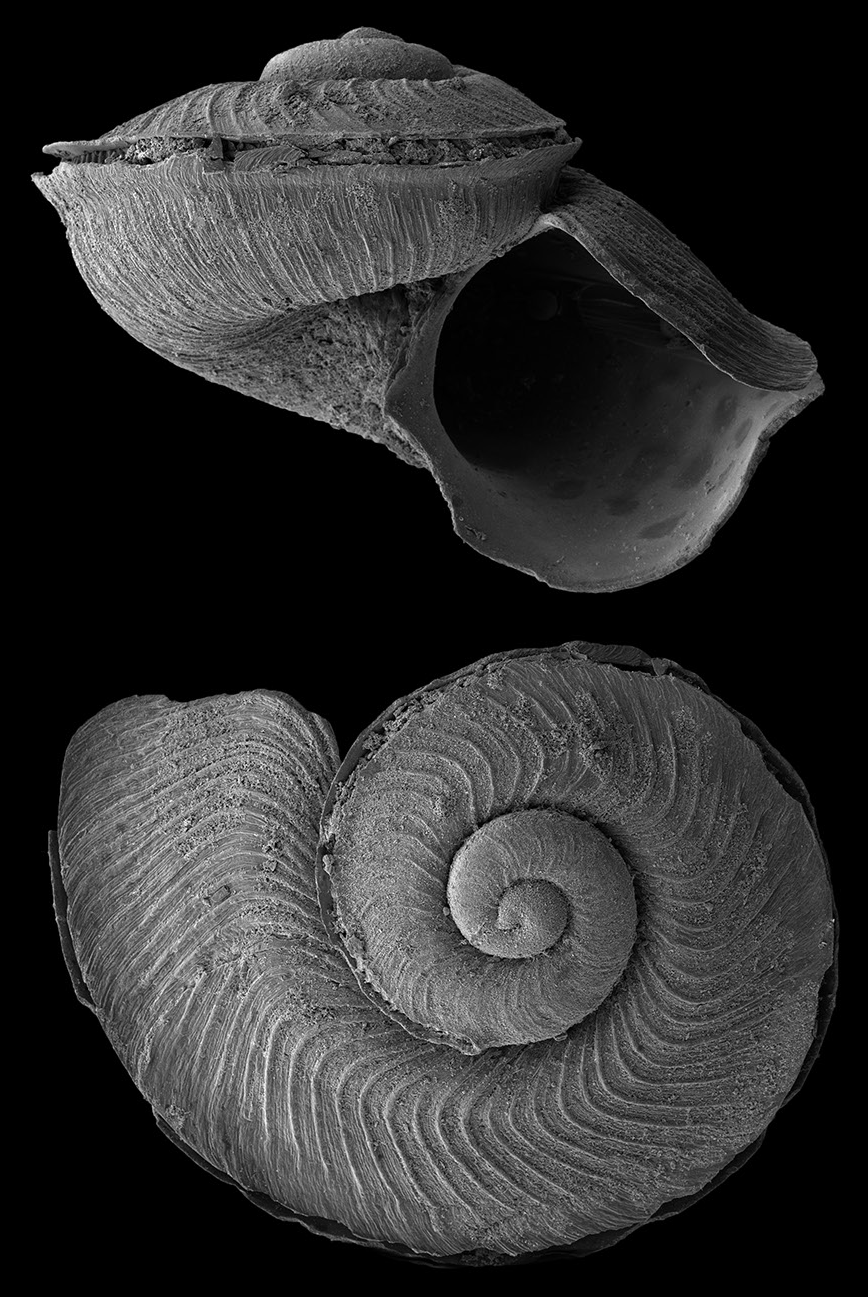
- Shell of Anatoma laevapex (holotype)

Scientific classification
- Kingdom: Animalia
- Phylum: Mollusca
- Class: Gastropoda
- Subclass: Vetigastropoda
- Order: Lepetellida
- Superfamily: Scissurelloidea
- Family: Anatomidae
- Genus: Anatoma
- Species: A. laevapex

Binomial name
- Anatoma laevapex L. Hoffman, Kniesz, Martínez Arbizu & Kihara, 2022

= Anatoma laevapex =

Species of gastropod

Anatoma laevapex is a species of small sea snail, a marine gastropod mollusk or micromollusk in the family Anatomidae.

== Etymology ==
The species name ‘laevapex’ refers to the smooth initial teleoconch.

== Description ==
The protoconch comprises a single, slightly elevated whorl with a pointed nucleus and coarsely pitted sculpture. The transition to the teleoconch is marked by a sharp lip with a flexuous margin, and is clearly distinguished by a change in sculpture. The protoconch measures 0.19 mm in diameter.

The teleoconch features a flattened spire and a disk-shaped outline, with sloping, weakly convex shoulders and a smooth apex. The margins of the selenizone are prominently protruding. Flexuous axial ribs are present, and the aperture is pear-shaped with a distinct slit. The suture is deep. Shell dimensions are: height 1.0 mm, width 1.5 mm, and aperture height 0.67 mm (67% of total height). The shell is an opaque grayish white.

There are 2¼ regularly coiled whorls with convex shoulder areas and a rounded base. The selenizone is positioned above the periphery, and the distance between the base of the selenizone and the suture is small but increases progressively.

The umbilicus is open, tortuous, and deep, with a steep spiral keel leading to the base of the columellar callus.

The aperture has a rounded base, columella, and parietal area, with a flattened shoulder and a funnel-shaped selenizone. It tapers to a pointed junction with the penultimate whorl. The lip is sharp, strongly reclined at its union with the penultimate whorl, and protrudes prominently at both the upper shoulder and the columella. A thin, reclining callus is present along the parietal area, and the lower lip is distinctly disk-shaped. The slit is positioned above the periphery, extending one-quarter of a whorl in depth, bordered above and below by flattened, sharp margins. The callus remains thin throughout, and the interior of the aperture is smooth.

Anatomical description: The body is translucent white anteriorly, with orange-brown internal organs visible within the visceral mass. The white radula can be seen inside the translucent neck region. The snout is smooth, broad, and flattened, featuring two symmetrical anterior lobes that are united by a single flat, convex margin on the antero-dorsal surface (Fig. 9D–E). Eyes are absent.

A pair of broad, tapered cephalic tentacles is present, each bearing six rounded lobes with deep folds between them; the tips are blunt and non-papillate. The foot is small when contracted, presenting an irregular surface texture. The epipodium bears five pairs of appendages, with the three anterior pairs consisting of epipodial tentacles or possibly small epipodial sensory organs (ESOs). This article incorporates text from this source, which is available under the CC BY-SA 4.0 license.

== Distribution ==
This species occurs in the Central Indian Ridge at depths between 2560–3296 m.
