= Anatoma parageia =

Scientific classification
- Kingdom: Animalia
- Phylum: Mollusca
- Class: Gastropoda
- Subclass: Vetigastropoda
- Order: Lepetellida
- Family: Anatomidae
- Genus: Anatoma
- Species: A. parageia

Binomial name
- Anatoma parageia Geiger & Sasaki, 2009

Species of gastropod

Anatoma parageia is a species of sea snail, a marine gastropod mollusk in the family Anatomidae.

== Etymology ==
The species name parageia comes from the Greek parageios, meaning pertaining to shallow water, referring to its intertidal or shallow subtidal habitat, which is unusual for an anatomid.

== Description ==
The shell of Anatoma parageia is minute, with a height of 0.74 mm and a width of 0.51 mm. The shell is thin, translucent, and has a slit typical of the family Anatomidae.

== Distribution and habitat ==
This species occurs off Japan, primarily in shallow subtidal zones and intertidal areas, often associated with rocky substrates and algae.
