= Anatoma golikovi =

Scientific classification
- Kingdom: Animalia
- Phylum: Mollusca
- Class: Gastropoda
- Subclass: Vetigastropoda
- Order: Lepetellida
- Family: Anatomidae
- Genus: Anatoma
- Species: A. golikovi

Binomial name
- Anatoma golikovi Nekhaev & Krol, 2020

Species of gastropod

Anatoma golikovi is a species of sea snail, a marine gastropod mollusc in the family Anatomidae.

== Distribution ==
This species occurs in the northwestern part of the Barents Sea.
