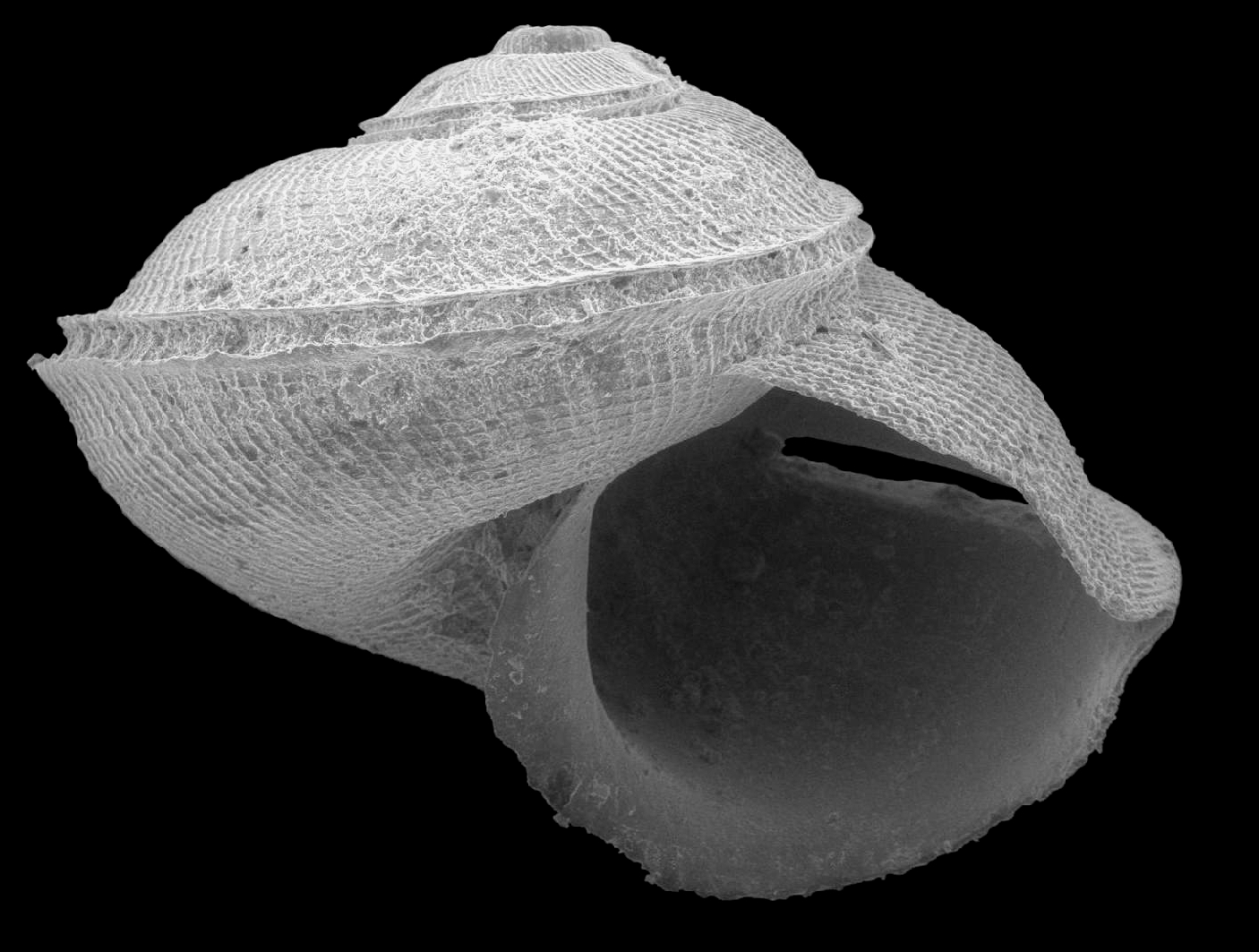
- Shell of Anatoma japonica (specimen at the Natural History Museum, London)

Scientific classification
- Kingdom: Animalia
- Phylum: Mollusca
- Class: Gastropoda
- Subclass: Vetigastropoda
- Order: Lepetellida
- Superfamily: Scissurelloidea
- Family: Anatomidae
- Genus: Anatoma
- Species: A. japonica

Binomial name
- Anatoma japonica (A. Adams, 1862)

Synonyms
- Anatoma aetheria (Melvill & Standen, 1903); Anatoma exquisita (Schepman, 1908); Anatoma jansenae Geiger, 2006; Anatomus japonicus A. Adams, 1862 (original combination); Scissurella aetheria Melvill & Standen, 1903; Scissurella exquisita Schepman, 1908

= Anatoma japonica =

Species of gastropod

Anatoma japonica is a species of small sea snail, a marine gastropod mollusk or micromollusk in the family Anatomidae.

== Description ==
The length of the shell varies between 1 mm and 2.5 mm. It has a trochiform shell. The spire contains 3½ rather convex whorls. They are finely decussated by elevated longitudinal striae and close striae. The longitudinal striae are flexuous at the base. The aperture is subcircular. The outer lip is dilated and reflexed in the middle.

== Distribution ==
This marine species occurs in deep water off the Philippines, Japan, and Southeast Africa.
