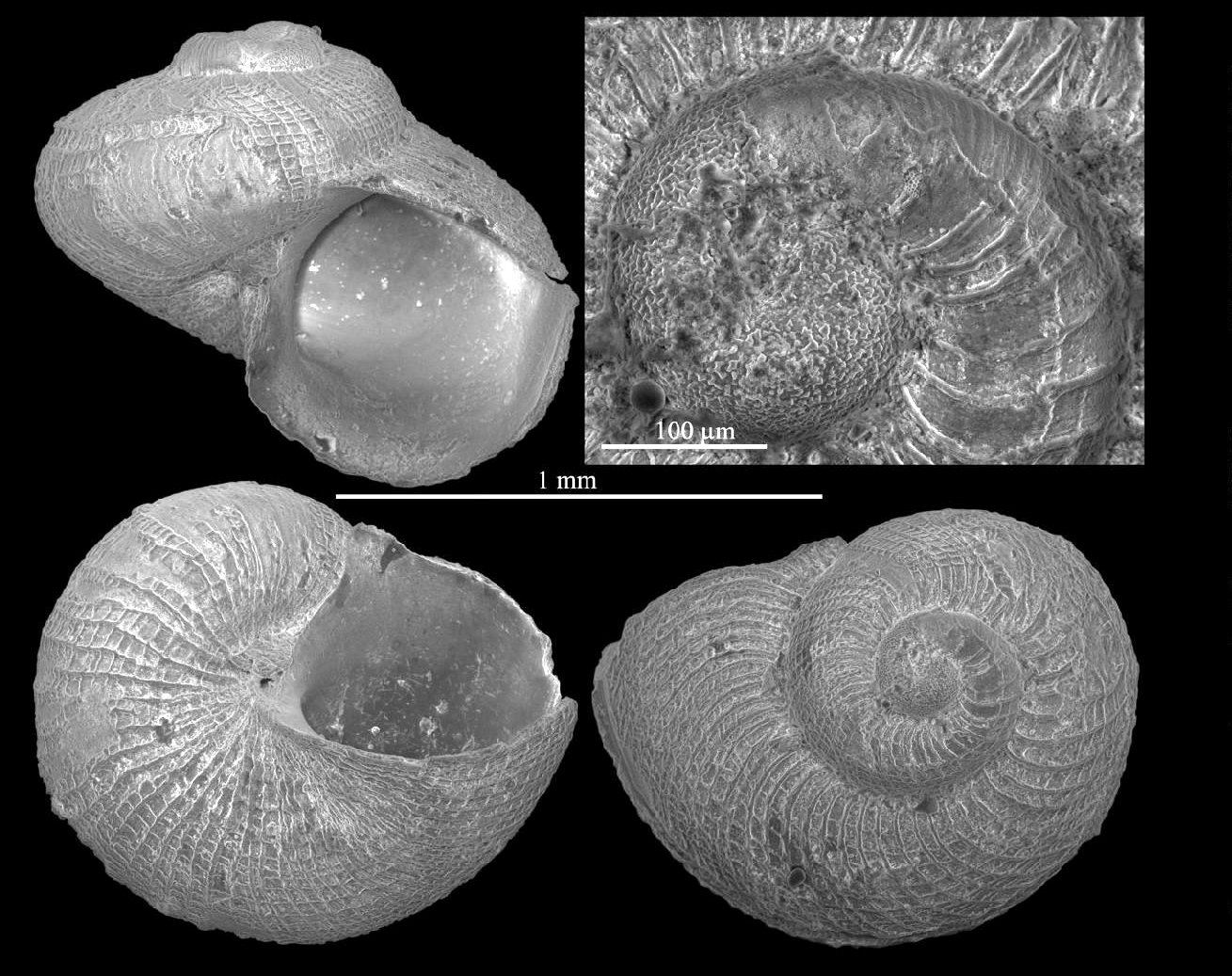
- Shell of Anatoma concinna (lectotype at the Natural History Museum, London)

Scientific classification
- Kingdom: Animalia
- Phylum: Mollusca
- Class: Gastropoda
- Subclass: Vetigastropoda
- Order: Lepetellida
- Superfamily: Scissurelloidea
- Family: Anatomidae
- Genus: Anatoma
- Species: A. concinna

Binomial name
- Anatoma concinna A. Adams, 1862

Synonyms
- Anatoma obtusata (Golikov & Gulbin, 1978); Anatomus concinnus A. Adams, 1862 (original combination); Scissurella obtusata Golikov & Gulbin, 1978

= Anatoma concinna =

Species of gastropod

Anatoma concinna is a species of small sea snail, a marine gastropod mollusk or micromollusk in the family Anatomidae.

== Description ==
(Original description in Latin) The shell is ovate and somewhat depressed. Its spire is small, scarcely elevated, and narrowly and deeply umbilicate. It has 2½ convex whorls, which are neatly decussated (crossed) with elevated radial and concentric striae. The aperture is oblique and sub-orbicular.

The ovate shell is rather depressed. The small spire is scarcely elevated and narrowly, profoundly umbilicate. The 2½ convex whorls are decussated by elevated radiating and concentric striae. The oblique aperture is suborbicular.

== Distribution ==
This marine species occurs off Japan.
