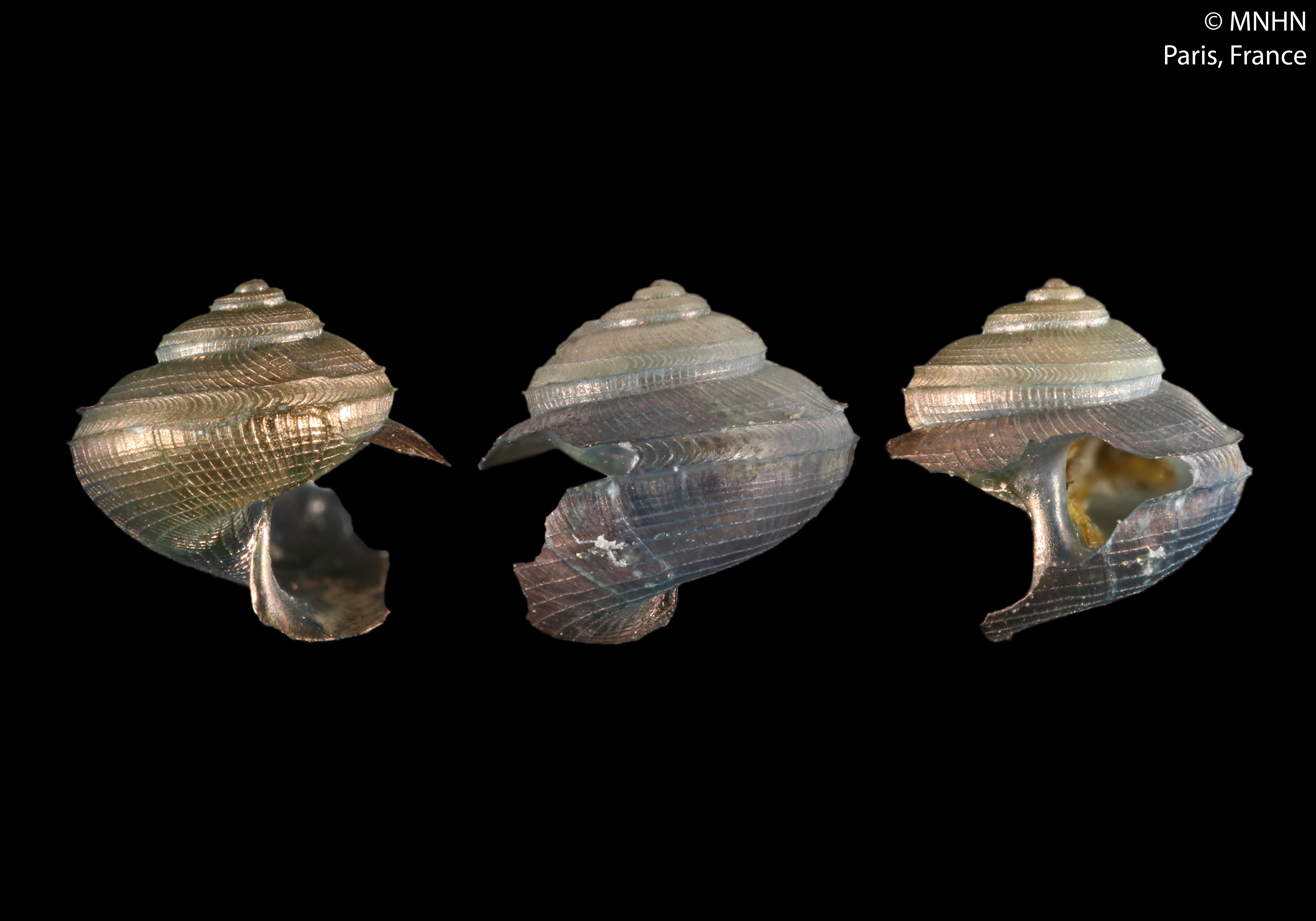
- Shell of Anatoma flexidentata (holotype at MNHN, Paris)

Scientific classification
- Kingdom: Animalia
- Phylum: Mollusca
- Class: Gastropoda
- Subclass: Vetigastropoda
- Order: Lepetellida
- Family: Anatomidae
- Genus: Anatoma
- Species: A. flexidentata

Binomial name
- Anatoma flexidentata Geiger & Sasaki, 2008

= Anatoma flexidentata =

Species of gastropod

Anatoma flexidentata is a species of sea snail, a marine gastropod mollusc in the family Anatomidae.

== Description ==
The length of the shell attains 2.9 mm.

== Distribution ==
This species occurs in the Indian Ocean (off Réunion and Mozambique) to the western Pacific (New Caledonia, Fiji, Vanuatu); also off Australia (New South Wales).
