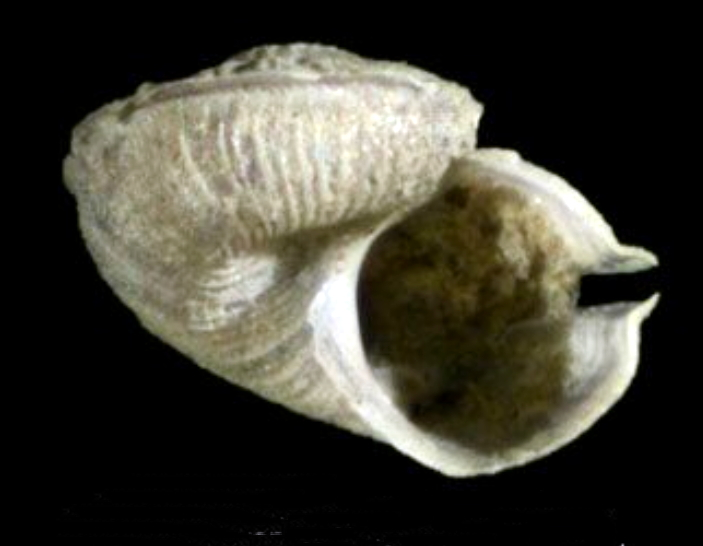
- Shell of Anatoma micalii (specimen at the Natural History Museum Rotterdam)

Scientific classification
- Kingdom: Animalia
- Phylum: Mollusca
- Class: Gastropoda
- Subclass: Vetigastropoda
- Order: Lepetellida
- Superfamily: Scissurelloidea
- Family: Anatomidae
- Genus: Anatoma
- Species: A. micalii

Binomial name
- Anatoma micalii D. L. Geiger, 2012

= Anatoma micalii =

Species of gastropod

Anatoma micalii is a species of small sea snail, a marine gastropod mollusc or micromollusc in the family Anatomidae.

== Description ==
The length of the shell attains 1 mm. Anatoma micalii is similar in size and shape to the Skerki species but differs markedly in having a very raised selenizone and a much coarser sculpture on the upper part of the last whorl (30–40 coarse axial ribs vs. 60–70 fine riblets).

== Distribution ==
This species occurs in the Mediterranean Sea off Cape Ferrat, France and in the Strait of Messina and off Corsica.
