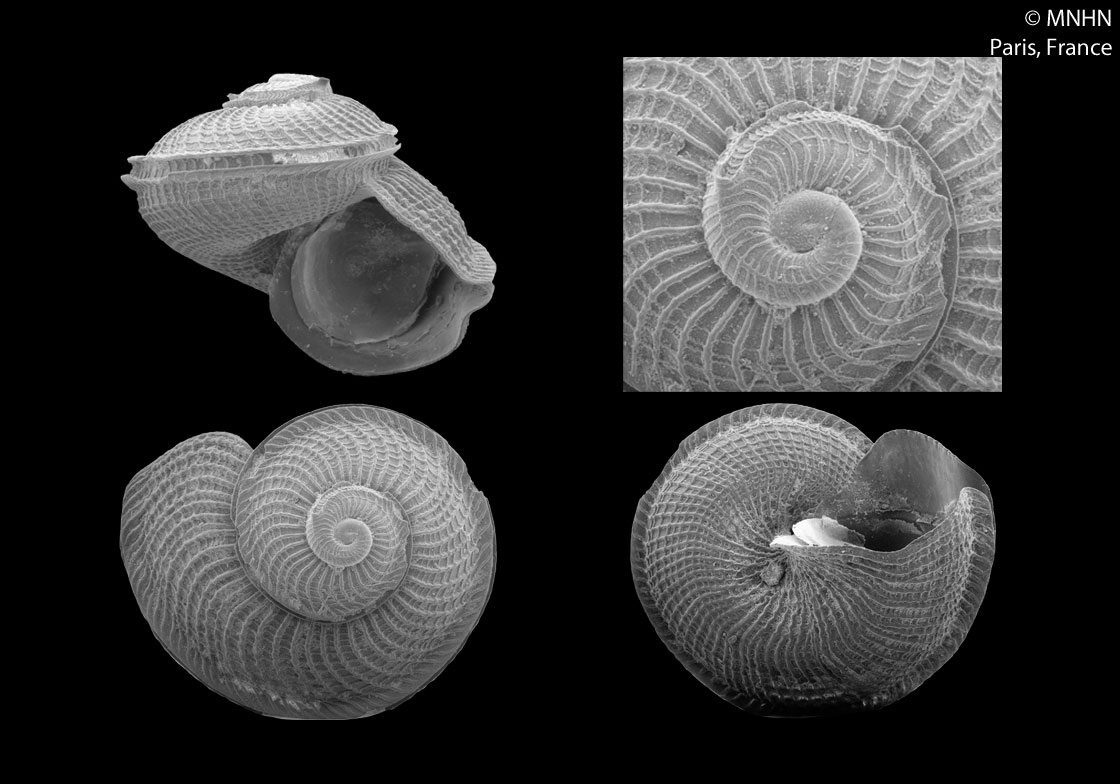
- Shell of Anatoma orbiculata (holotype at MNHN, Paris)

Scientific classification
- Kingdom: Animalia
- Phylum: Mollusca
- Class: Gastropoda
- Subclass: Vetigastropoda
- Order: Lepetellida
- Superfamily: Scissurelloidea
- Family: Anatomidae
- Genus: Anatoma
- Species: A. orbiculata

Binomial name
- Anatoma orbiculata Geiger, 2012

= Anatoma orbiculata =

Species of gastropod

Anatoma orbiculata is a species of small sea snail, a marine gastropod mollusc or micromollusc in the family Anatomidae.

== Description ==
The length of the shell attains 1.7 mm.

== Distribution ==
This species occurs in the Atlantic Ocean off Morocco.
