= Anatoma indonesica =

Scientific classification
- Kingdom: Animalia
- Phylum: Mollusca
- Class: Gastropoda
- Subclass: Vetigastropoda
- Order: Lepetellida
- Superfamily: Scissurelloidea
- Family: Anatomidae
- Genus: Anatoma
- Species: A. indonesica

Binomial name
- Anatoma indonesica Bandel, 1998

Species of gastropod

Anatoma indonesica is a species of small sea snail, a marine gastropod mollusk or micromollusk in the family Anatomidae.

== Distribution ==
This specie soccurs in the Indo-West Pacific and the Kermadec Islands.
