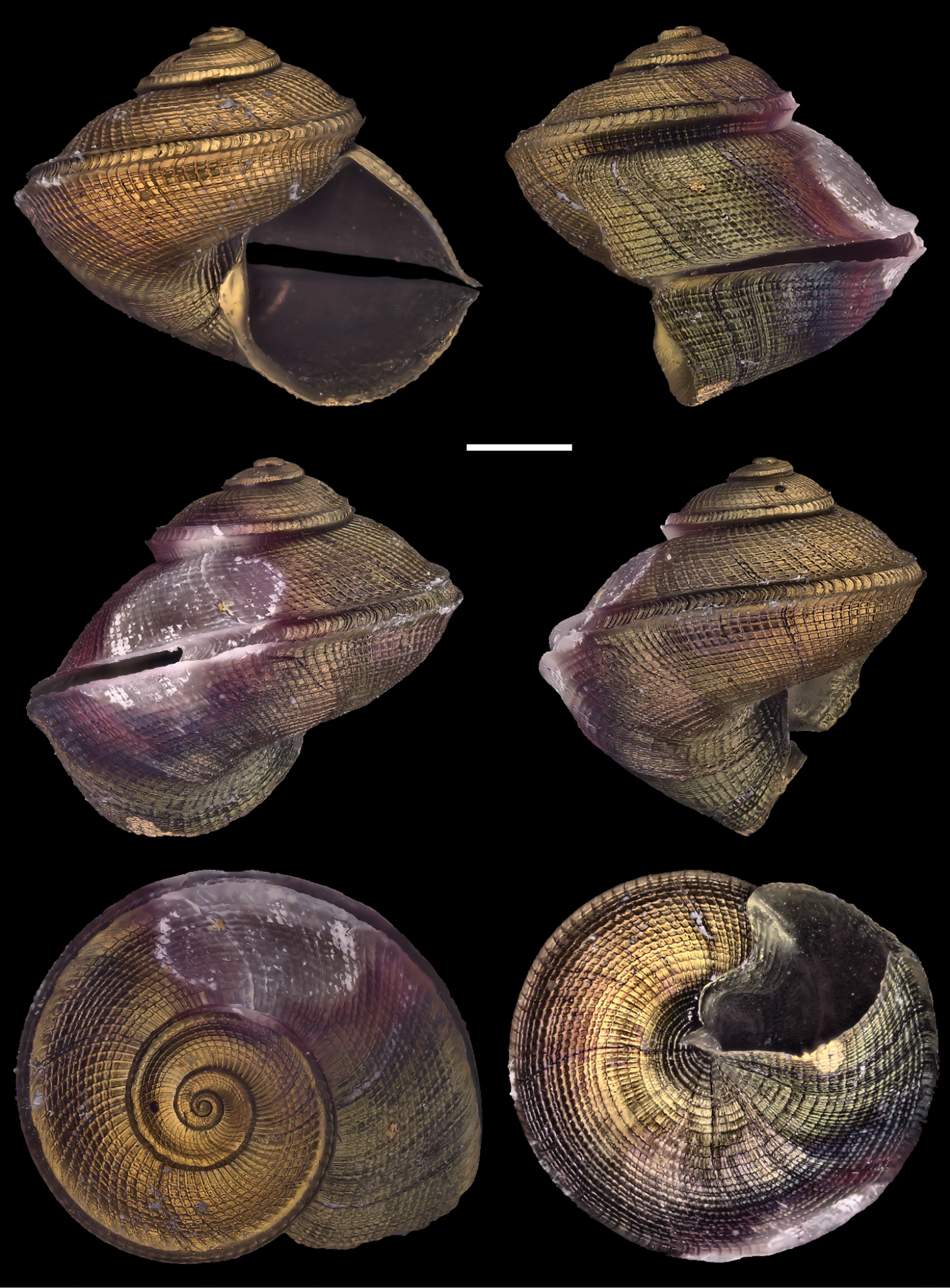

Scientific classification
- Kingdom: Animalia
- Phylum: Mollusca
- Class: Gastropoda
- Subclass: Vetigastropoda
- Order: Lepetellida
- Superfamily: Scissurelloidea
- Family: Anatomidae
- Genus: Anatoma
- Species: A. yaroni

Binomial name
- Anatoma yaroni Herbert, 1986

= Anatoma yaroni =

Species of gastropod

Anatoma yaroni is a species of small sea snail, a marine gastropod mollusk or micromollusk in the family Anatomidae.

== Description ==
The size of the shell varies between 4 mm and 5 mm. The shell ranges from brown to dark green in color. Though the shell is thin, it is very strong in comparison to other snails.

== Distribution ==
This marine species occurs off Transkei, South Africa.
