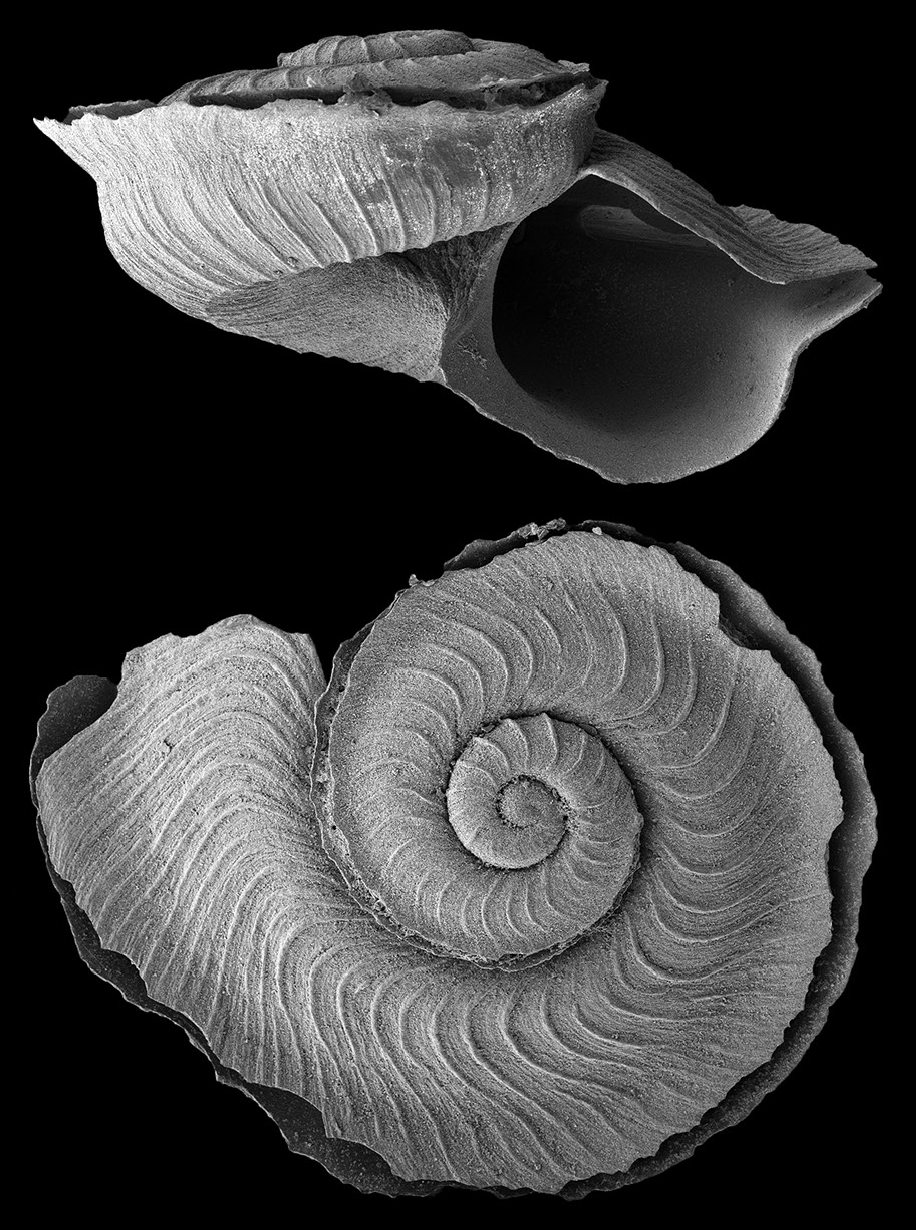
- Shell of Anatoma discapex (holotype)

Scientific classification
- Kingdom: Animalia
- Phylum: Mollusca
- Class: Gastropoda
- Subclass: Vetigastropoda
- Order: Lepetellida
- Superfamily: Scissurelloidea
- Family: Anatomidae
- Genus: Anatoma
- Species: A. discapex

Binomial name
- Anatoma discapex L. Hoffman, Kniesz, Martínez Arbizu & Kihara, 2022

= Anatoma discapex =

Species of gastropod

Anatoma discapex is a species of small sea snail, a marine gastropod mollusk or micromollusk in the family Anatomidae.

== Etymology ==
The species name ‘discapex’ refers to the flattened apex.

== Description ==
The protoconch consists of a single flat whorl with coarse, pitted sculpture. The transition to the teleoconch is marked by a raised, flexuous lip with a pronounced rim, and is clearly delineated by a distinct change in shell sculpture. The protoconch measures 0.20 mm in diameter.

The teleoconch displays a flattened upper spire and a disk-shaped outline, with strongly protruding margins of the selenizone. The surface is marked by flexuous axial ribs. The aperture is pear-shaped and features a distinct slit, while the suture is deep. Shell dimensions are: height 1.3 mm, width 2.1 mm, and aperture height 0.85 mm (60% of total shell height). The shell is an opaque grayish white.

There are 2¼ regularly coiled whorls, each with a flattened to slightly convex shoulder area and a rounded base. The selenizone is positioned slightly above the periphery, and the suture lies well below the selenizone of the penultimate whorl in the last half of the body whorl.

The umbilicus is open, tortuous, and deep, with a steeply spiraling keel at the junction of the columellar callus and parietal area.

The aperture has a rounded base and is funnel-shaped as it approaches the selenizone, tapering to a point at the junction with the penultimate whorl. The columellar lip is sharp and protruding, rounded at the base, and becomes flexuous toward the parietal area, where it bears a thin, reclining callus. The lower lip is semicircular. The slit is situated just above the periphery, flanked on either side by the concave edge of the lip, and extends to a depth of approximately one-quarter of a whorl, bordered with flattened sharp margins above and below. The callus is thin; the inside of the aperture is smooth.

Soft anatomy: The snout is smooth, broad, and flattened, featuring a single symmetrical anterior lobe with pointed front margins to the left and right. Eyes are absent. The cephalic tentacles are broad and tapered, each bearing eight rounded, deeply folded lobes that gradually decrease in diameter toward their blunt, non-papillate tips.

The foot is small when contracted and has an irregular surface texture. On the right side, there are four epipodial appendages: two small, papillate epipodial tentacles anteriorly, and two larger appendages posteriorly, with the most posterior likely representing an epipodial sensory organ. On the left side, three epipodial appendages are present: a small papillate tentacle anteriorly, followed by a second smaller epipodial tentacle or small ESO, and finally a large, posterior ESO.

The visceral mass consists of little more than one whorl. The mantle is smooth with a rounded, non-papillate margin. This article incorporates text from this source, which is available under the CC BY-SA 4.0 license.

== Distribution ==
This species occurs in the Central Indian Ridge at depths between 2560–3296 m.
