= Anatoma alternatisculpta =

Scientific classification
- Kingdom: Animalia
- Phylum: Mollusca
- Class: Gastropoda
- Subclass: Vetigastropoda
- Order: Lepetellida
- Superfamily: Scissurelloidea
- Family: Anatomidae
- Genus: Anatoma
- Species: A. alternatisculpta

Binomial name
- Anatoma alternatisculpta Geiger & McLean, 2010

Species of gastropod

Anatoma alternatisculpta is a species of minute sea snail, a marine gastropod mollusk or micromollusk in the family Anatomidae.

== Distribution ==
This species occurs in the Atlantic Ocean off Brazil.
