= Anatoma peruviana =

Scientific classification
- Kingdom: Animalia
- Phylum: Mollusca
- Class: Gastropoda
- Subclass: Vetigastropoda
- Order: Lepetellida
- Superfamily: Scissurelloidea
- Family: Anatomidae
- Genus: Anatoma
- Species: A. peruviana

Binomial name
- Anatoma peruviana (Geiger & McLean, 2010)

Synonyms
- Thieleella peruviana Geiger & McLean, 2010

Species of gastropod

Anatoma peruviana is a species of small sea snail, a marine gastropod mollusk or micromollusk in the family Anatomidae.

== Description ==
The shell attains a length of 3 mm.

== Distribution ==
This species occurs in the Pacific Ocean off Peru.
