= Anatoma plicatazona =

Scientific classification
- Kingdom: Animalia
- Phylum: Mollusca
- Class: Gastropoda
- Subclass: Vetigastropoda
- Order: Lepetellida
- Superfamily: Scissurelloidea
- Family: Anatomidae
- Genus: Anatoma
- Species: A. plicatazona

Binomial name
- Anatoma plicatazona Geiger & McLean, 2010

Species of gastropod

Anatoma plicatazona is a species of minute sea snail, a marine gastropod mollusk or micromollusk in the family Anatomidae.

== Description ==
The shell attains a length of 1.5 mm.

== Distribution ==
This marine species occurs off The Bahamas.
