= Anatoma pseudoequatoria =

Scientific classification
- Kingdom: Animalia
- Phylum: Mollusca
- Class: Gastropoda
- Subclass: Vetigastropoda
- Order: Lepetellida
- Superfamily: Scissurelloidea
- Family: Anatomidae
- Genus: Anatoma
- Species: A. pseudoequatoria

Binomial name
- Anatoma pseudoequatoria (Kay, 1979)

Synonyms
- Anatoma funiculata Geiger & Jansen, 2004; Anatoma paucispiralia (Bandel, 1998); Anatoma pulchella (Bandel, 1998); Hainella paucispiralia Bandel, 1998; Hainella pulchella Bandel, 1998; Scissurella pseudoequatoria Kay, 1979

Species of gastropod

Anatoma pseudoequatoria is a species of small sea snail, a marine gastropod mollusk or micromollusk in the family Anatomidae.

== Description ==
The diameter of the shell attains 0.9 mm, its height 0.5 mm.

== Distribution ==
This species occurs in the Pacific Ocean off Hawaii, Vanuatu, New Caledonia and the Kermadec Islands.
