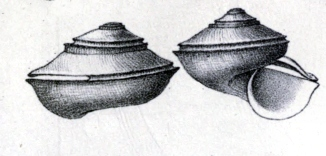
- Two views of a shell of Anatoma umbilicata

Scientific classification
- Kingdom: Animalia
- Phylum: Mollusca
- Class: Gastropoda
- Subclass: Vetigastropoda
- Order: Lepetellida
- Superfamily: Scissurelloidea
- Family: Anatomidae
- Genus: Anatoma; Woodward, 1859

Type species
- A. crispata Fleming, 1828

Synonyms
- Anatomus H. & A. Adams; Hainella Bandel, 1998; Schizotrochus Monterosato, 1877; Scissurella (Anatoma) Woodward, 1859 (original rank); Scissurella (Schizotrochus) Monterosato, 1817 junior subjective synonym; Thieleella Bandel, 1998

= Anatoma =

Genus of gastropods

Anatoma is a genus of minute marine gastropod molluscs or micromolluscs in the family Anatomidae, found in Europe, Australia and New Zealand.

They were formerly placed as a subfamily in the family Scissurellidae. They were raised to family level by Geiger and Jansen in 2004.

== Description ==
Anatoma snails have conical or top-shaped (turbiniform) shells. The shell often features a slit or hole in the margin of the outer lip and possesses a deep, perspective umbilicus. This genus is further characterized a rhipidoglossate radula, and a lack of nacre. Their shells may be sculptured with longitudinal lamellae and transverse lines, along with ornamentation like concentric elevated lirae.

== Species ==
The genus Anatoma includes the following species:

- Anatoma aedonia (Watson, 1886)
- Anatoma africana (Barnard, 1963)
- Anatoma agulhasensis (Thiele, 1925)
- Anatoma alta (Watson, 1886)
- Anatoma alternatisculpta Geiger & McLean, 2010
- Anatoma amoena (Thiele, 1912)
- Anatoma amydra Geiger & B.A. Marshall, 2012
- Anatoma argentinae (Zelaya & Geiger, 2007)
- Anatoma aspera (Philippi, 1844)
- Anatoma atlantica (Bandel, 1998)
- Anatoma aupouria (Powell, 1937)
- Anatoma australis (Hedley, 1903)
- Anatoma austrolissa Geiger & Sasaki, 2008
- Anatoma balgimae Utrilla & Gofas, 2024
- Anatoma bathypacifica (Geiger & McLean, 2010)
- Anatoma biconica Geiger, 2012
- Anatoma bisculpta L. Hoffman, Gofas & Freiwald, 2021
- Anatoma boucheti Geiger & Sasaki, 2008
- Anatoma breveprima Geiger, 2012
- Anatoma brychia Pimenta & Geiger, 2015
- Anatoma campense Pimenta & Geiger, 2015
- Anatoma concinna A. Adams, 1862
- Anatoma conica (d'Orbigny, 1841)
- Anatoma copiosa Pimenta & Geiger, 2015
- Anatoma corralae Serge GOFAS, Ángel A. LUQUE, Joan Daniel OLIVER, José TEMPLADO & Alberto SERRA (2021), 2021
- Anatoma crispata (Fleming, 1828)
- Anatoma declivis L. Hoffman, Kniesz, Martínez Arbizu & Kihara, 2022
- Anatoma discapex L. Hoffman, Kniesz, Martínez Arbizu & Kihara, 2022
- Anatoma disciformis (Golikov & Sirenko, 1980)
- Anatoma emilioi Geiger, 2011
- Anatoma equatoria (Hedley, 1899)
- Anatoma espiritosantense Pimenta & Geiger, 2015
- Anatoma euglypta (Pelseneer, 1903)
- Anatoma eximia (Seguenza, 1877)
- Anatoma finlayi (Powell, 1937)
- Anatoma flemingi (B.A. Marshall, 2002)
- Anatoma flexidentata Geiger & Sasaki, 2008
- Anatoma fujikurai Sasaki, Geiger & Okutani 2010
- Anatoma georgii Geiger, 2017
- † Anatoma gephrya Maxwell, 1992
- Anatoma globulus Geiger, 2012
- Anatoma golikovi Nekhaev & Krol, 2020
- Anatoma gunteri (Cotton & Godfrey, 1933)
- † Anatoma hedegaardi (Bandel, 1998)
- Anatoma hyposculpta Geiger, 2012
- Anatoma indonesica Bandel, 1998
- Anatoma janetae Geiger, 2006
- Anatoma janusa Geiger, 2012
- Anatoma japonica (A. Adams, 1862)
- Anatoma keenae (McLean, 1970)
- Anatoma kelseyi (Dall, 1905)
- Anatoma kopua Geiger & B.A. Marshall, 2012
- Anatoma laevapex L. Hoffman, Kniesz, Martínez Arbizu & Kihara, 2022
- Anatoma lamellata (A. Adams, 1862)
- Anatoma lyra (S. S. Berry, 1947)
- Anatoma maxima (Schepman, 1908)
- Anatoma megascutula Geiger & B.A. Marshall, 2012
- Anatoma micalii Geiger, 2012
- † Anatoma miocenica (Laws, 1939)
- Anatoma munieri (P. Fischer, 1862)
- Anatoma occidentalis L. Hoffman & Freiwald, 2022
- Anatoma orbiculata Geiger, 2012
- Anatoma pagoda L. Hoffman, Gofas & Freiwald, 2021
- Anatoma parageia Geiger & Sasaki, 2009
- Anatoma paucisculpta L. Hoffman, Kniesz, Martínez Arbizu & Kihara, 2022
- Anatoma peruviana (Geiger & McLean, 2010)
- † Anatoma philippiana (O. Semper, 1865)
- Anatoma philippinica (Bandel, 1998)
- Anatoma planapex Geiger, 2012
- Anatoma plicatazona Geiger & McLean, 2010
- Anatoma porcellana Geiger, 2012
- Anatoma proxima (Dall, 1927)
- Anatoma pseudoequatoria (Kay, 1979)
- Anatoma quadraxialis Geiger, 2012
- Anatoma rainesi Geiger, 2003
- Anatoma rapaensis Geiger, 2008
- † Anatoma redoniana Landau, Van Dingenen & Ceulemans, 2017
- Anatoma regia (Mestayer, 1916)
- Anatoma rhynchodentata Geiger, 2012
- Anatoma richardi (Dautzenberg & H. Fischer, 1896)
- Anatoma rolani Geiger & Fernández-Garcés, 2010
- † Anatoma rosenkrantzi Schnetler, Lozouet & Pacaud, 2001
- Anatoma sagamiana (Okutani, 1964)
- Anatoma schanderi Høisæter & Geiger, 2011
- Anatoma shiraseae Numanami & Okutani, 1990
- Anatoma sinuosa Geiger, 2012
- Anatoma soyoae (Habe, 1951)
- Anatoma symmetrica L. Hoffman, Gofas & Freiwald, 2021
- Anatoma tabulata (Barnard, 1964)
- Anatoma tangaroa Geiger & B.A. Marshall, 2012
- Anatoma tenuis (Jeffreys, 1877)
- Anatoma tenuisculpta (Seguenza, 1877)
- Anatoma tobeyoides Geiger & Jansen, 2004
- † Anatoma tongaensis (Ladd, 1970)
- Anatoma umbilicata (Jeffreys, 1883)
- Anatoma weddelliana (Zelaya & Geiger, 2007)
- Anatoma yaroni Herbert, 1986
- Anatoma zancliformis Geiger, 2012

Synonyms include:

- Anatoma aequatorina Hedley, 1899: synonym of Anatoma equatoria (Hedley, 1899)
- Anatoma aetheria (Melvill & Standen, 1903): synonym of Anatoma japonica (A. Adams, 1862)
- Anatoma americana Bandel, 1998: synonym of Anatoma proxima (Dall, 1927)
- Anatoma baxteri McLean, 1984: synonym of Thieleella baxteri (McLean, 1984)
- Anatoma cebuana Bandel, 1998: synonym of Scissurella cebuana (Bandel, 1998)
- Anatoma chiricova (Dall, 1919): synonym of Anatoma kelseyi (Dall, 1905)
- † Anatoma costamagnaensis Bandel, 1998: synonym of Anatoma aspera (Philippi, 1844)
- Anatoma dohrniana Dunker, 1861: synonym of Scissurella dohrniana (Dunker, 1861)
- Anatoma epicharis (McLean, 1970): synonym of Anatoma keenae (McLean, 1970)
- Anatoma exquisita (Schepman, 1908): synonym of Anatoma japonica (A. Adams, 1862)
- Anatoma funiculata Geiger & Jansen, 2004: synonym of Anatoma pseudoequatoria (Kay, 1979)
- Anatoma herberti Geiger & Sasaki, 2008: synonym of Anatoma finlayi (Powell, 1937)
- Anatoma jacksoni (Melvill, 1904): synonym of Anatoma munieri (P. Fischer, 1862)
- Anatoma jansenae Geiger, 2006: synonym of Anatoma japonica (A. Adams, 1862)
- Anatoma josephinae (Odhner, 1960): synonym of Anatoma tenuis (Jeffreys, 1877)
- Anatoma mantelli (Woodward, 1859): synonym of Scissurella mantelli Woodward, 1859
- Anatoma mirifica A. Adams, 1862: synonym of Scissurella mirifica (A. Adams, 1862)
- Anatoma obtusata (Golikov & Gulbin, 1978): synonym of Anatoma concinna (A. Adams, 1862)
- Anatoma paucispiralia (Bandel, 1998): synonym of Anatoma pseudoequatoria (Kay, 1979)
- Anatoma pulchella (Bandel, 1998): synonym of Anatoma pseudoequatoria (Kay, 1979)
- Anatoma schioettei Høisæter & Geiger, 2011: synonym of Anatoma crispata (J. Fleming, 1828) (a junior synonym)
- Anatoma staminea A. Adams, 1862: synonym of Scissurella staminea (A. Adams, 1862)
- Anatoma turbinata A. Adams, 1862: synonym of Anatoma munieri (P. Fischer, 1862)

Nomen dubium

- Anatoma bertheloti (d'Orbigny, 1840)
