= Anatoma corralae =

Scientific classification
- Kingdom: Animalia
- Phylum: Mollusca
- Class: Gastropoda
- Subclass: Vetigastropoda
- Order: Lepetellida
- Family: Anatomidae
- Genus: Anatoma
- Species: A. corralae

Binomial name
- Anatoma corralae Gofas & Luque, 2021

Species of gastropod

Anatoma corralae is a species of sea snail, a marine gastropod mollusc in the family Anatomidae.

== Distribution ==
This species occurs in the northeast Atlantic Ocean on seamounts of the Galicia Bank, approximately 200 km west of the Galician coast of Spain
