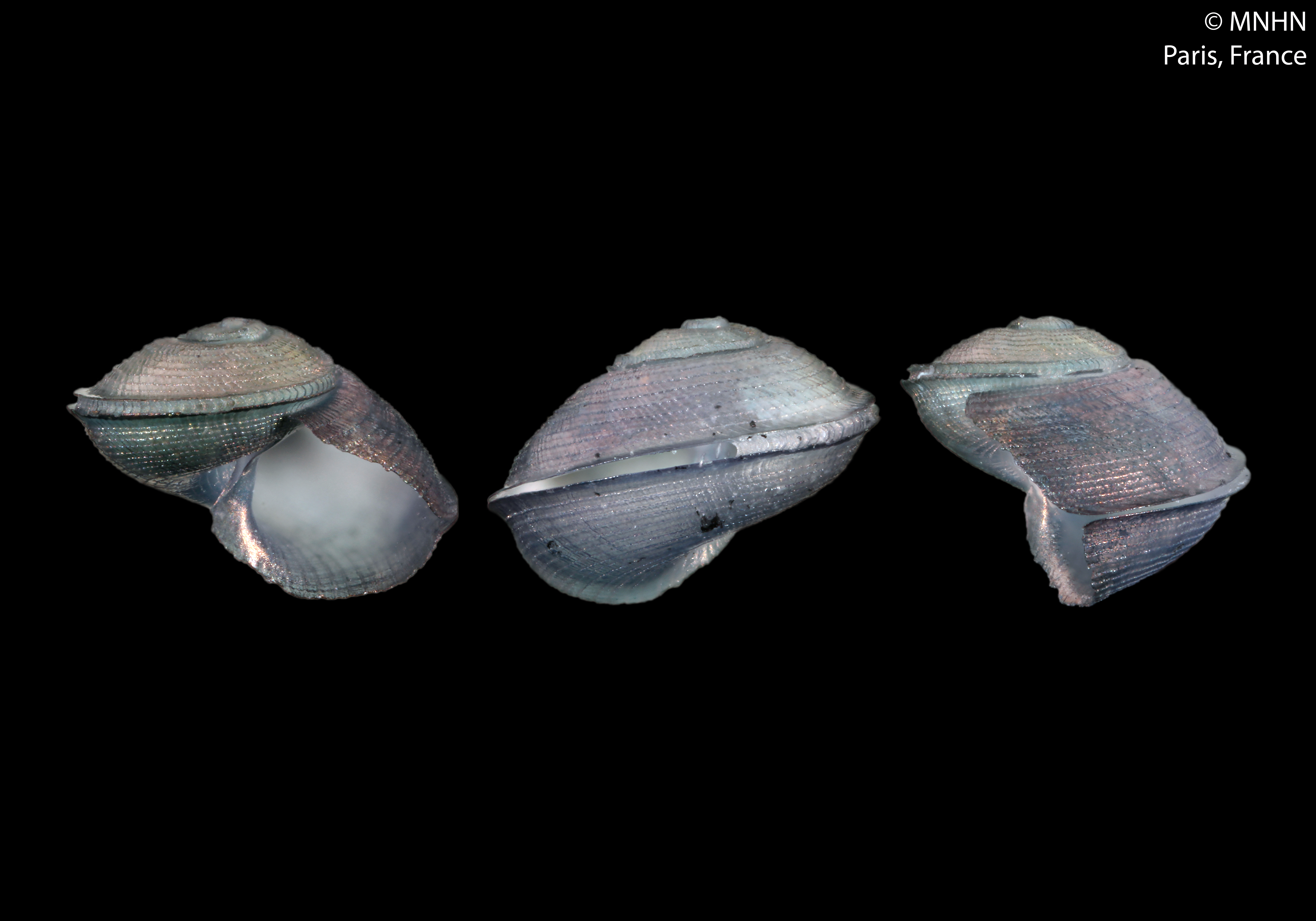
- Shell of Anatoma rapaensis (holotype at MNHN, Paris)

Scientific classification
- Kingdom: Animalia
- Phylum: Mollusca
- Class: Gastropoda
- Subclass: Vetigastropoda
- Order: Lepetellida
- Family: Anatomidae
- Genus: Anatoma
- Species: A. rapaensis

Binomial name
- Anatoma rapaensis Geiger, 2008

= Anatoma rapaensis =

Species of gastropod

Anatoma rapaensis is a species of sea snail, a marine gastropod mollusc in the family Anatomidae.

== Distribution ==
This marine species occurs off the Marquesas Islands and Austral Islands.
