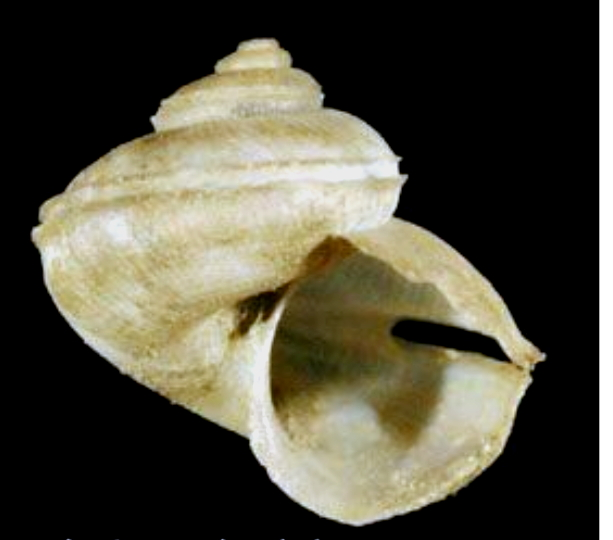
- Shell of Anatoma schanderi (specimen at the Natural History Museum Rotterdam)

Scientific classification
- Kingdom: Animalia
- Phylum: Mollusca
- Class: Gastropoda
- Subclass: Vetigastropoda
- Order: Lepetellida
- Superfamily: Scissurelloidea
- Family: Anatomidae
- Genus: Anatoma
- Species: A. schanderi

Binomial name
- Anatoma schanderi Høisæter & Geiger, 2011

= Anatoma schanderi =

Species of gastropod

Anatoma schanderi is a species of small sea snail, a marine gastropod mollusk or micromollusk in the family Anatomidae.

== Description ==
The diameter of the shell is 4.5 mm.

== Distribution ==
This marine species occurs in the Atlantic Ocean off Canada and at southern margin of the Greenland Basin in the Norwegian Sea.
