= Anatoma emilioi =

Scientific classification
- Kingdom: Animalia
- Phylum: Mollusca
- Class: Gastropoda
- Subclass: Vetigastropoda
- Order: Lepetellida
- Family: Anatomidae
- Genus: Anatoma
- Species: A. emilioi

Binomial name
- Anatoma emilioi Geiger, 2011

Species of gastropod

Anatoma emilioi is a species of small sea snail, a marine gastropod mollusk or micromollusk in the family Anatomidae.

== Description ==
Shell of moderate size for the genus (1.75 mm) and trochiform turreted in shape. The protoconch has 0.75 whorls, has flocculent sculpture with fine spiral lines, the apertural varix is not connected to embryonic cap, apertural margin is sinusoid. The aperture is subquadratic, rood overhanging. Selenizone at periphery, keels strong, moderately strong elevated, distinctly inwardly curved; lunules distinct. Slit open.

== Distribution ==
This species is only known from its type locality in the Hawaiian Islands, where it was found in depths between 37 and 183 m, in Mamala Bay, Oahu.

== Etymology ==
This species was named in honor of Emilio Garcia of Lafayette, Louisiana, USA.
