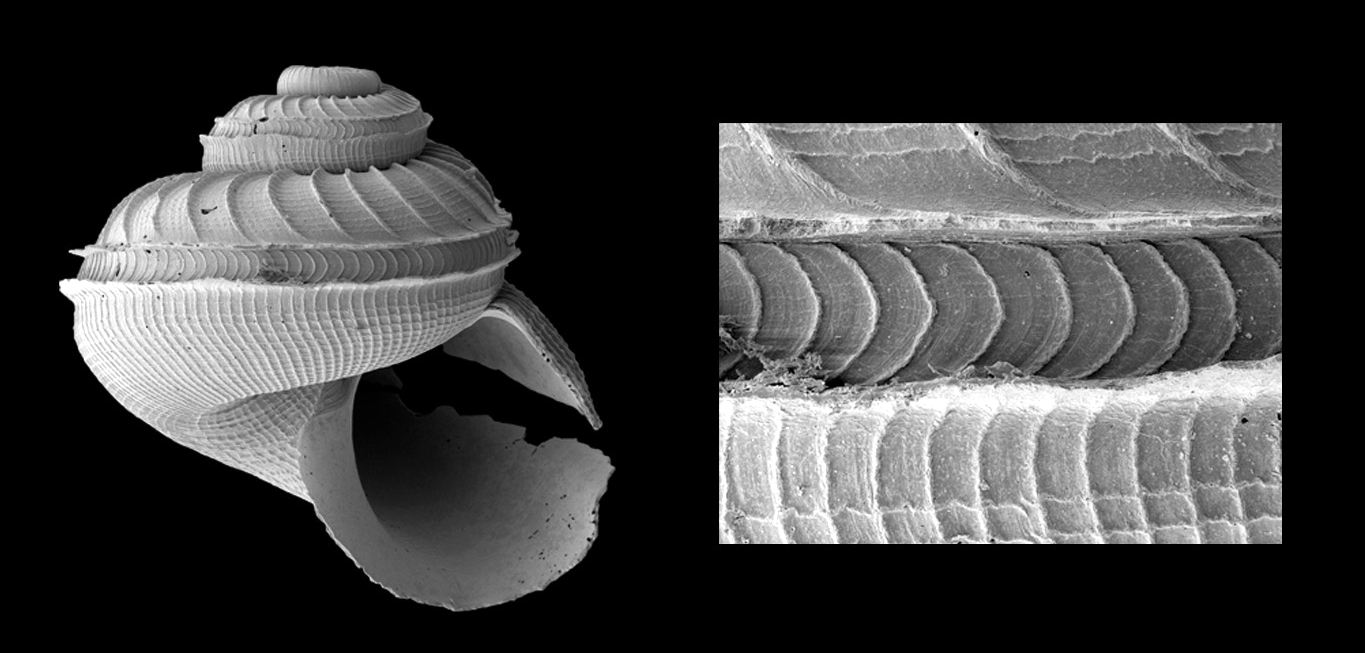
- Shell of Anatoma bisculpta (holotype at MNHN, Paris)

Scientific classification
- Kingdom: Animalia
- Phylum: Mollusca
- Class: Gastropoda
- Subclass: Vetigastropoda
- Order: Lepetellida
- Family: Anatomidae
- Genus: Anatoma
- Species: A. bisculpta

Binomial name
- Anatoma bisculpta L. Hoffman, Gofas & Freiwald, 2021

= Anatoma bisculpta =

Species of gastropod

Anatoma bisculpta is a species of sea snail, a marine gastropod mollusc in the family Anatomidae.

== Description ==
The length of the shell attains 1.48 mm.

== Distribution ==
This species occurs in the Atlantic Ocean on the Little Meteor Seamount off the Azores.
