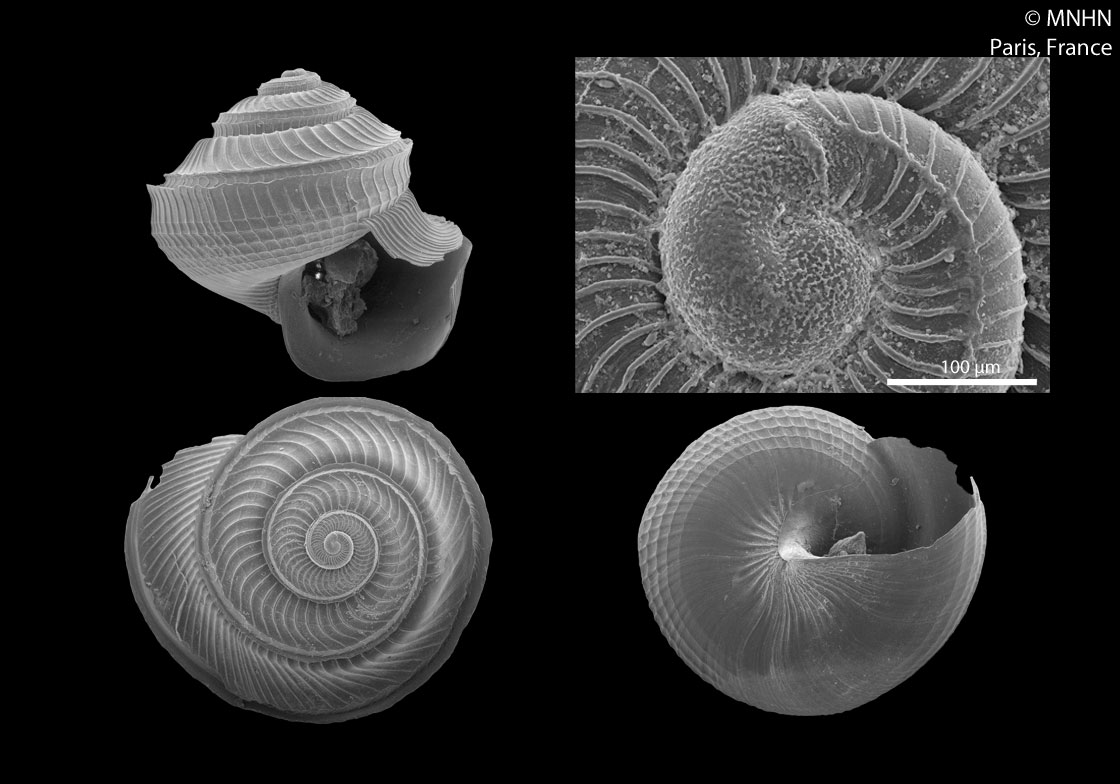
- Shell of Anatoma porcellana (holotype at MNHN, Paris)

Scientific classification
- Kingdom: Animalia
- Phylum: Mollusca
- Class: Gastropoda
- Subclass: Vetigastropoda
- Order: Lepetellida
- Superfamily: Scissurelloidea
- Family: Anatomidae
- Genus: Anatoma
- Species: A. porcellana

Binomial name
- Anatoma porcellana Geiger, 2012

= Anatoma porcellana =

Species of gastropod

Anatoma porcellana is a species of small sea snail, a marine gastropod mollusc or micromollusc in the family Anatomidae.

== Description ==
The length of the shell attains 3.2 mm.

== Distribution ==
This marine species occurs off the Philippines.
