= Anatoma proxima =

Scientific classification
- Kingdom: Animalia
- Phylum: Mollusca
- Class: Gastropoda
- Subclass: Vetigastropoda
- Order: Lepetellida
- Family: Anatomidae
- Genus: Anatoma
- Species: A. proxima

Binomial name
- Anatoma proxima (Dall, 1927)

Synonyms
- Anatoma americana Bandel, 1998; Scissurella proxima Dall, 1927

Species of gastropod

Anatoma proxima is a species of small sea snail, a marine gastropod mollusk in the family Scissurellidae.

== Description ==
The shell grows to a length of 1.7 mm, its diameter 3 mm.

(Original description) The shell is minute and white, consisting of nearly four whorls. The slit measures approximately one-fourth the length of the whorl. The suture is distinct but not deep. The posterior surface between the suture and the fasciole is marked by arcuate striations. The base is moderately convex and appears nearly smooth to the naked eye, though under magnification, a faint reticulation formed by incremental lines and subtle spiral threads becomes visible. The umbilicus is perforate. The aperture is rounded, and the columellar lip is slightly reflected.

== Distribution ==
This species occurs in the Atlantic Ocean off the Southeastern coast of the US.
