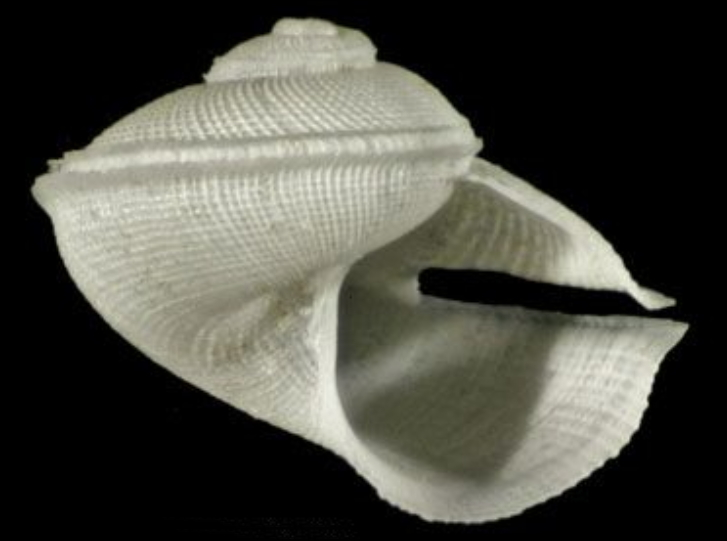
- Shell of Anatoma atlantica (specimen at the Natural History Museum Rotterdam)

Scientific classification
- Kingdom: Animalia
- Phylum: Mollusca
- Class: Gastropoda
- Subclass: Vetigastropoda
- Order: Lepetellida
- Family: Anatomidae
- Genus: Anatoma
- Species: A. atlantica

Binomial name
- Anatoma atlantica (Bandel, 1998)

Synonyms
- Hainella atlantica Bandel, 1998

= Anatoma atlantica =

Species of gastropod

Anatoma atlantica is a species of minute sea snail, a marine gastropod mollusk in the family Anatomidae.

== Description ==
The shell of this species grows to a length of 2.1 mm.

== Distribution ==
This species occurs in the Atlantic Ocean off Eastern Florida and North Carolina, US; also off the Bahamas and Brazil.
