= Anatoma soyoae =

Scientific classification
- Kingdom: Animalia
- Phylum: Mollusca
- Class: Gastropoda
- Subclass: Vetigastropoda
- Order: Lepetellida
- Superfamily: Scissurelloidea
- Family: Anatomidae
- Genus: Anatoma
- Species: A. soyoae

Binomial name
- Anatoma soyoae (Habe, 1951)

Synonyms
- Schizotrochus soyoae Habe, 1951

Species of gastropod

Anatoma soyoae is a species of small sea snail, a marine gastropod mollusk or micromollusk in the family Anatomidae.

== Distribution ==
This marine species occurs off Japan.
