= Anatoma tangaroa =

Scientific classification
- Kingdom: Animalia
- Phylum: Mollusca
- Class: Gastropoda
- Subclass: Vetigastropoda
- Order: Lepetellida
- Superfamily: Scissurelloidea
- Family: Anatomidae
- Genus: Anatoma
- Species: A. tangaroa

Binomial name
- Anatoma tangaroa Geiger & B.A. Marshall, 2012

Species of gastropod

Anatoma tangaroa is a species of small sea snail, a marine gastropod mollusc or micromollusc in the family Anatomidae.

== Description ==
The width of the shell attains 1.79 mm, its height is 1.42 mm.

== Distribution ==
This marine species is endemic to New Zealand and occurs off the Middlesex and King Banks, Three Kings Islands, west of Cape Reinga, and on the Kermadec Ridge.
