= Anatoma occidentalis =

Scientific classification
- Kingdom: Animalia
- Phylum: Mollusca
- Class: Gastropoda
- Subclass: Vetigastropoda
- Order: Lepetellida
- Superfamily: Scissurelloidea
- Family: Anatomidae
- Genus: Anatoma
- Species: A. occidentalis

Binomial name
- Anatoma occidentalis L. Hoffman & Freiwald, 2022

Species of gastropod

Anatoma occidentalis is a species of minute sea snail, a marine gastropod mollusk or micromollusk in the family Anatomidae.

== Description ==
The height of the shell attains 2.2 mm , its diameter 2.5 mm.

== Distribution ==
This marine species occurs on the Tamxat Mounds, off Mauritania; also off Angola.
