= Anatoma espiritosantense =

Scientific classification
- Kingdom: Animalia
- Phylum: Mollusca
- Class: Gastropoda
- Subclass: Vetigastropoda
- Order: Lepetellida
- Family: Anatomidae
- Genus: Anatoma
- Species: A. espiritosantense

Binomial name
- Anatoma espiritosantense Pimenta & D. L. Geiger, 2015

Species of gastropod

Anatoma espiritosantense is a species of sea snail, a marine gastropod mollusc in the family Anatomidae.

== Distribution ==
This species occurs in the Atlantic Ocean off Brazil.
