= Anatoma weddelliana =

Scientific classification
- Kingdom: Animalia
- Phylum: Mollusca
- Class: Gastropoda
- Subclass: Vetigastropoda
- Order: Lepetellida
- Superfamily: Scissurelloidea
- Family: Anatomidae
- Genus: Anatoma
- Species: A. weddelliana

Binomial name
- Anatoma weddelliana (Zelaya & Geiger, 2007)

Synonyms
- Thieleella weddelliana Zelaya & Geiger, 2007

Species of gastropod

Anatoma weddelliana is a species of small sea snail, a marine gastropod mollusc or micromollusc in the family Anatomidae.

== Description ==
The height of the shell reaches 5.6 mm.

== Distribution ==
This species occurs in the Weddell Sea, Antarctica.
