= Anatoma rainesi =

Scientific classification
- Kingdom: Animalia
- Phylum: Mollusca
- Class: Gastropoda
- Subclass: Vetigastropoda
- Order: Lepetellida
- Family: Anatomidae
- Genus: Anatoma
- Species: A. rainesi

Binomial name
- Anatoma rainesi Geiger, 2003

Species of gastropod

Anatoma rainesi is a species of sea snail, a marine gastropod mollusk in the family Anatomidae.

== Distribution ==
This marine species occurs in the Pacific Ocean off Easter Island.
