= Anatoma quadraxialis =

Scientific classification
- Kingdom: Animalia
- Phylum: Mollusca
- Class: Gastropoda
- Subclass: Vetigastropoda
- Order: Lepetellida
- Superfamily: Scissurelloidea
- Family: Anatomidae
- Genus: Anatoma
- Species: A. quadraxialis

Binomial name
- Anatoma quadraxialis Geiger, 2012

Species of gastropod

Anatoma quadraxialis is a species of small sea snail, a marine gastropod mollusc or micromollusc in the family Anatomidae.

== Distribution ==
This marine species occurs off New Caledonia.
