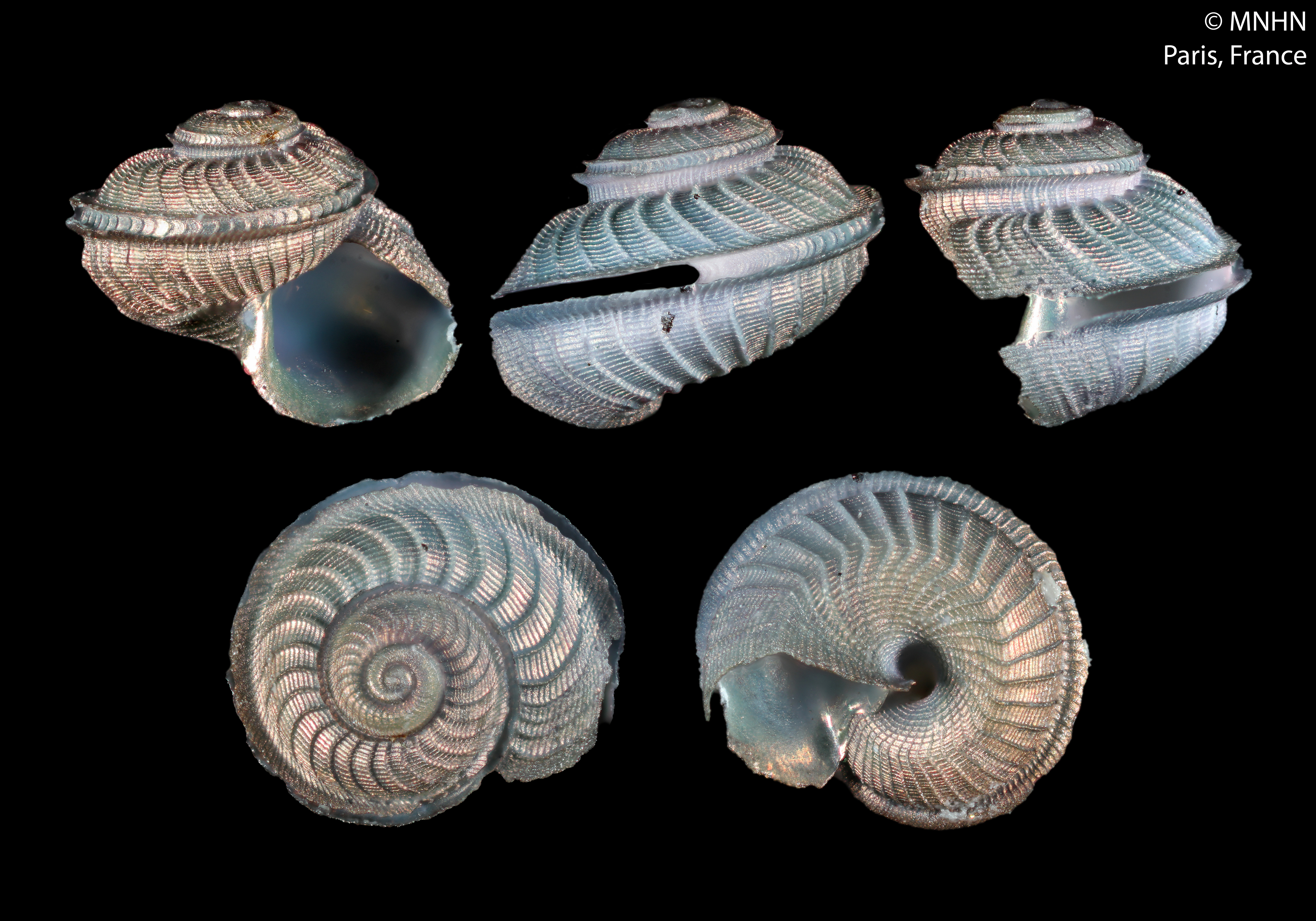
- Shell of Anatoma finlayi (holotype at MNHN, Paris)

Scientific classification
- Kingdom: Animalia
- Phylum: Mollusca
- Class: Gastropoda
- Subclass: Vetigastropoda
- Order: Lepetellida
- Family: Anatomidae
- Genus: Anatoma
- Species: A. finlayi

Binomial name
- Anatoma finlayi (Powell, 1937)

Synonyms
- Anatoma herberti Geiger & Sasaki, 2008; Schizotrochus finlayi Powell, 1937

= Anatoma finlayi =

Species of gastropod

Anatoma finlayi is a species of small sea snail, a marine gastropod mollusc or micromollusk in the family Anatomidae.

== Description ==
The height of the shell attains 1.7 mm, its width is 1.9 mm.

== Distribution ==
This marine species occurs in the Indian Ocean and central Pacific and off New Zealand (Norfolk Ridge, Three Kings Island, Kermadec Islands); also reported off South Africa.
