= Anatoma tobeyoides =

Scientific classification
- Kingdom: Animalia
- Phylum: Mollusca
- Class: Gastropoda
- Subclass: Vetigastropoda
- Order: Lepetellida
- Family: Anatomidae
- Genus: Anatoma
- Species: A. tobeyoides

Binomial name
- Anatoma tobeyoides Geiger, 2004

Species of gastropod

Anatoma tobeyoides is a species of sea snail, a marine gastropod mollusk in the family Anatomidae. It is named for the painter Mark Tobey.

== Description ==
The shell grows to a height of 1.5 mm.

== Distribution ==
This marine species occurs off Queensland, East South Australia, and off Tasmania.
