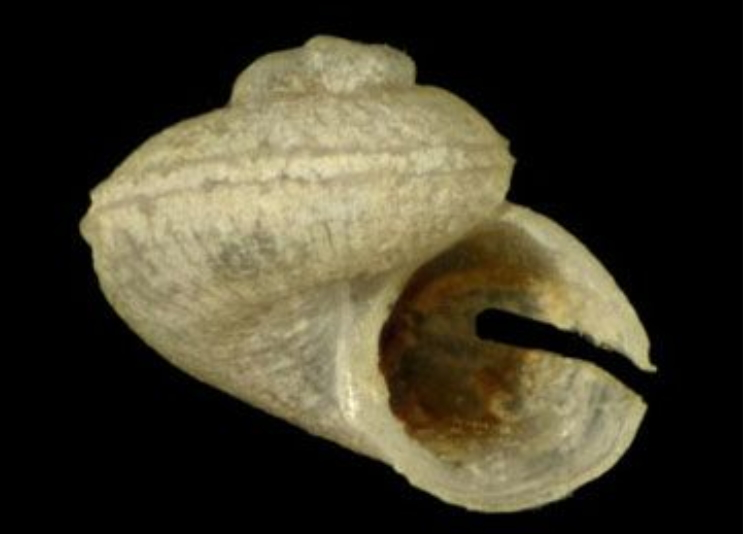
- Shell of Anatoma lyra (specimen at the Natural History Museum Rotterdam)

Scientific classification
- Kingdom: Animalia
- Phylum: Mollusca
- Class: Gastropoda
- Subclass: Vetigastropoda
- Order: Lepetellida
- Superfamily: Scissurelloidea
- Family: Anatomidae
- Genus: Anatoma
- Species: A. lyra

Binomial name
- Anatoma lyra (S. S. Berry, 1947)

Synonyms
- Anatoma baxteri McLean, 1984; Scissurella lyra S. Berry, 1947; Thieleella baxteri (McLean, 1984)

= Anatoma lyra =

Species of gastropod

Anatoma lyra is a species of small sea snail, a marine gastropod mollusk or micromollusk in the family Anatomidae.

== Description ==
The length of the shell attains 1.8 mm, its diameter 2.3 mm.

== Distribution ==
This marine species occurs off Alaska and British Columbia.
