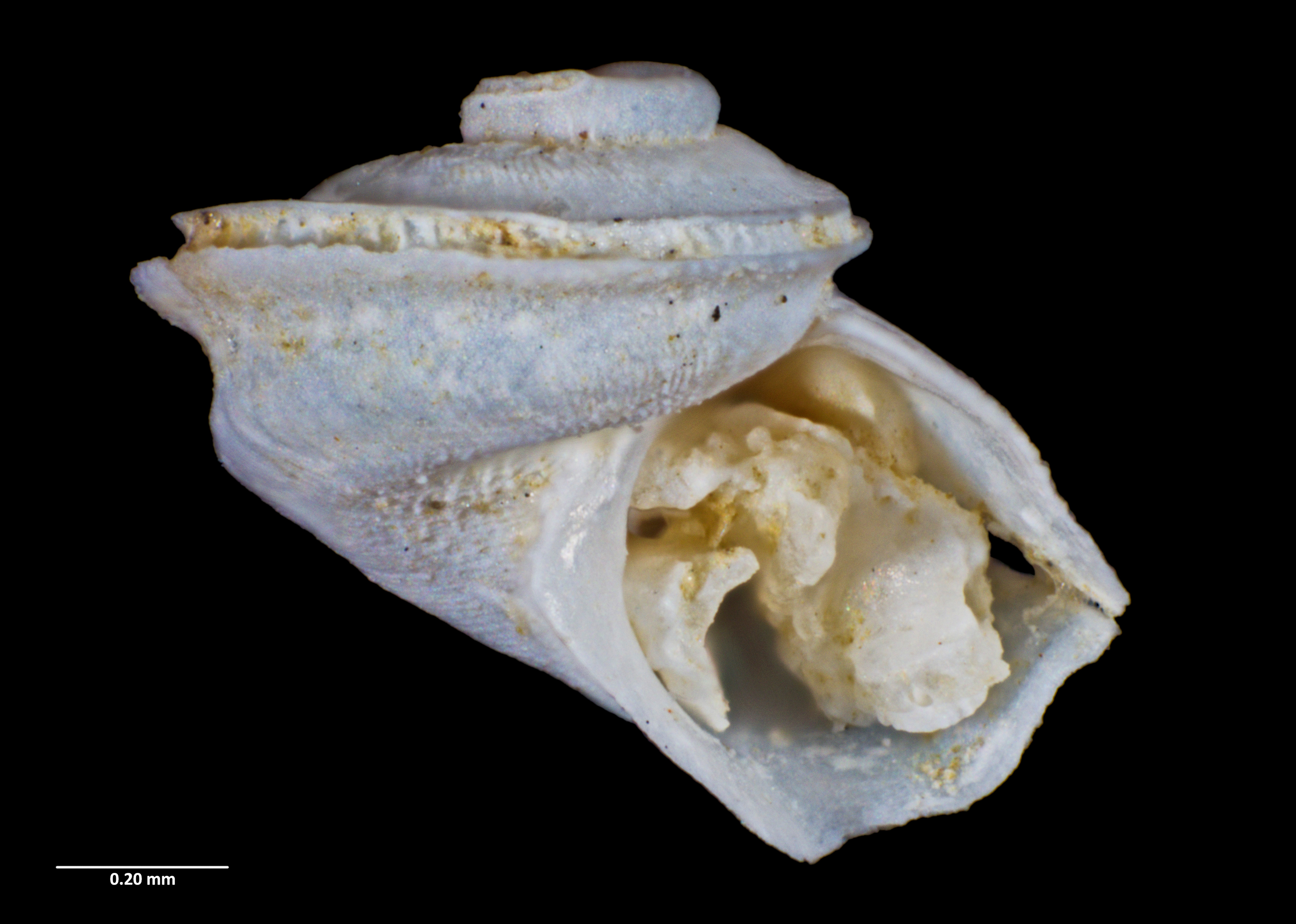
- Shell of Anatoma aupouria (specimen at the Auckland War Memorial Museum)

Scientific classification
- Kingdom: Animalia
- Phylum: Mollusca
- Class: Gastropoda
- Subclass: Vetigastropoda
- Order: Lepetellida
- Family: Anatomidae
- Genus: Anatoma
- Species: A. aupouria

Binomial name
- Anatoma aupouria (Powell, 1937)

Synonyms
- Schizotrochus aupouria Powell, 1937

= Anatoma aupouria =

Species of gastropod

Anatoma aupouria is a species of small sea snail, a marine gastropod mollusc or micromollusc in the family Anatomidae.

== Description ==
The width of the shell attains 1.25 mm, its height is 0.9 mm.

== Distribution ==
This marine species occurs off New Zealand, off the Lord Howe Island, and Norfolk Island, Australia.
