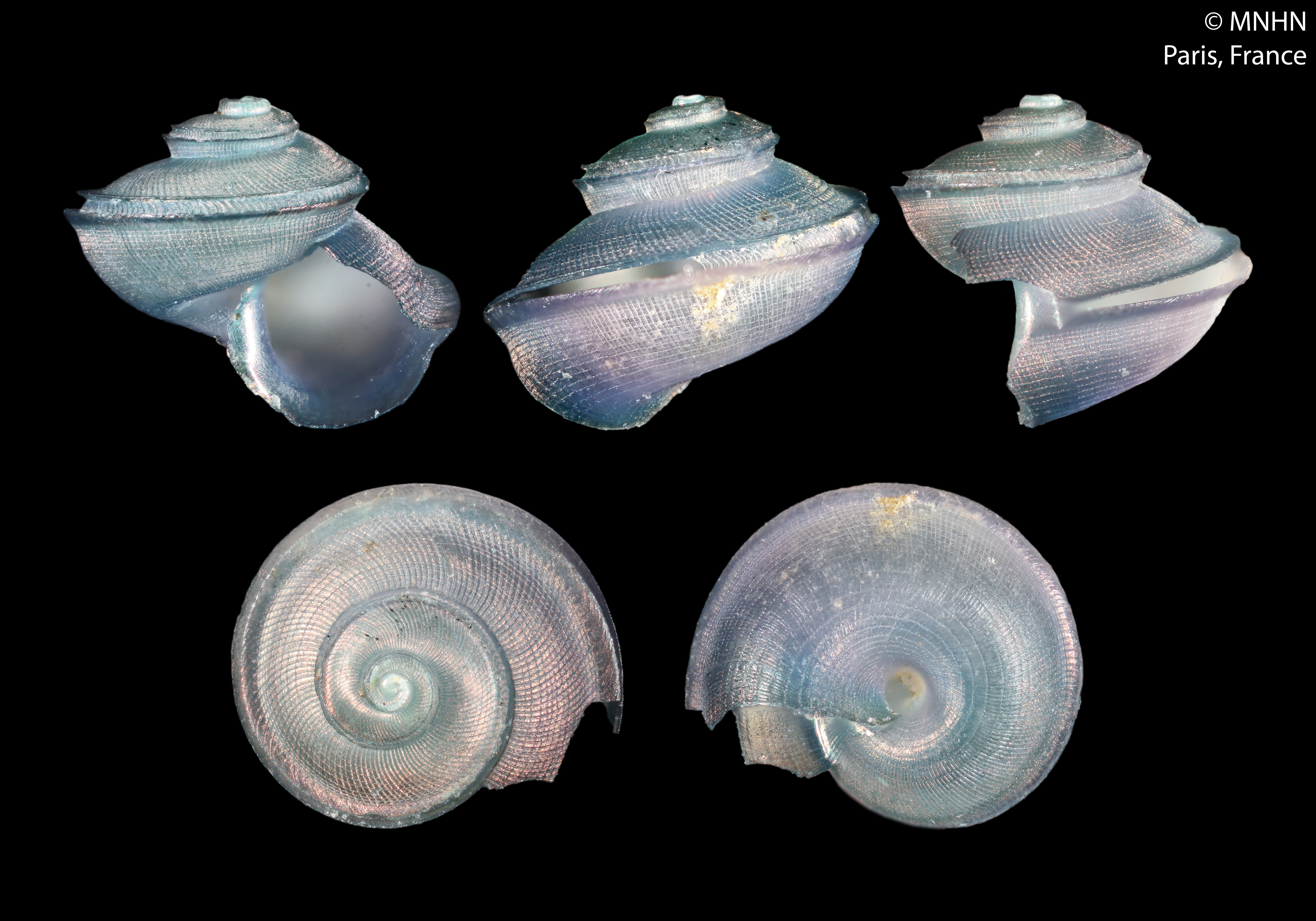
- Shells of Anatoma amydra (holotype at MNHN, Paris)

Scientific classification
- Kingdom: Animalia
- Phylum: Mollusca
- Class: Gastropoda
- Subclass: Vetigastropoda
- Order: Lepetellida
- Superfamily: Scissurelloidea
- Family: Anatomidae
- Genus: Anatoma
- Species: A. amydra

Binomial name
- Anatoma amydra Geiger & B.A. Marshall, 2012

= Anatoma amydra =

Species of gastropod

Anatoma amydra is a species of small sea snail, a marine gastropod mollusc or micromollusc in the family Anatomidae.

== Description ==
The width of the shell attains 3.4 mm.

== Distribution ==
This marine species occurs off New Caledonia, the Norfolk Ridge, and Three Kings Rise; New Zealand.
