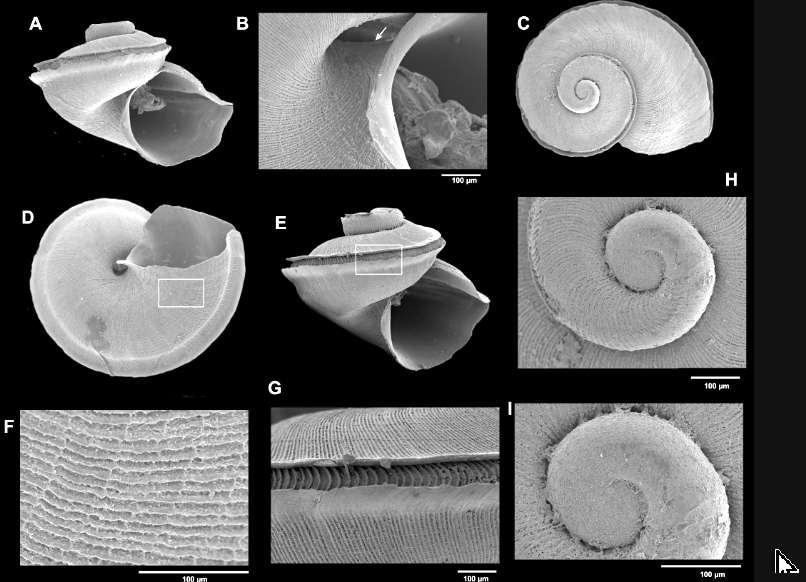
- Shell of Anatoma balgimai (holotype at MNHN, Paris)

Scientific classification
- Kingdom: Animalia
- Phylum: Mollusca
- Class: Gastropoda
- Subclass: Vetigastropoda
- Order: Lepetellida
- Family: Anatomidae
- Genus: Anatoma
- Species: A. balgimae

Binomial name
- Anatoma balgimae Utrilla & Gofas, 2024

= Anatoma balgimae =

Species of gastropod

Anatoma balgimae is a species of sea snail, a marine gastropod mollusc in the family Anatomidae.

== Description ==
The length of the shell attains 1.76 mm.

== Distribution ==
This species occurs in the Strait of Gibraltar.
