= Anatoma janetae =

Scientific classification
- Kingdom: Animalia
- Phylum: Mollusca
- Class: Gastropoda
- Subclass: Vetigastropoda
- Order: Lepetellida
- Family: Anatomidae
- Genus: Anatoma
- Species: A. janetae

Binomial name
- Anatoma janetae Geiger, 2006

Species of gastropod

Anatoma janetae is a species of sea snail, a marine gastropod mollusk in the family Anatomidae.

== Description ==
Anatoma janetae is a micromollusk with a shell length of up to approximately 3.8 mm. The teleoconch shows a distinct transition in sculpture, from robust axial cords near the selenizone to finer spiral threads. It possesses at least 2.25 whorls. The species lacks eyes and belongs to a group of blind deep-sea Anatoma.

== Distribution ==
This species occurs in the bathyal zone of Northeast Pacific Ocean.
