= Anatoma gunteri =

Scientific classification
- Kingdom: Animalia
- Phylum: Mollusca
- Class: Gastropoda
- Subclass: Vetigastropoda
- Order: Lepetellida
- Superfamily: Scissurelloidea
- Family: Anatomidae
- Genus: Anatoma
- Species: A. gunteri

Binomial name
- Anatoma gunteri (Cotton & Godfrey, 1933)

Synonyms
- Schizotrochus gunteri Cotton & Godfrey, 1933; Thieleella gunteri (Cotton & Godfrey, 1933)

Species of gastropod

Anatoma gunteri, common name Gunther's split shell, is a species of small sea snail, a marine gastropod mollusk or micromollusk in the family Anatomidae.

== Description ==
The length of the shell attains 1.1 mm, its diameter 1.5 mm.

(Original description) The minute shell isvery thin, semitranslucent and trochiform. It features a slightly gradate spire, a tumid base, and a narrow perforation, all in a white coloration. The upper surface of the body whorl displays very numerous, microscopic axial riblets, which appear more like accremental striae (and are apparently smooth to the naked eye). On the base, numerous, indistinct spiral threads are present, crossed by even less distinct radial lines. The shell comprises four whorls. Its slit fasciole is margined by two thin, low keels.

== Distribution ==
This marine species occurs off South Australia, Western Australia and Tasmania.
