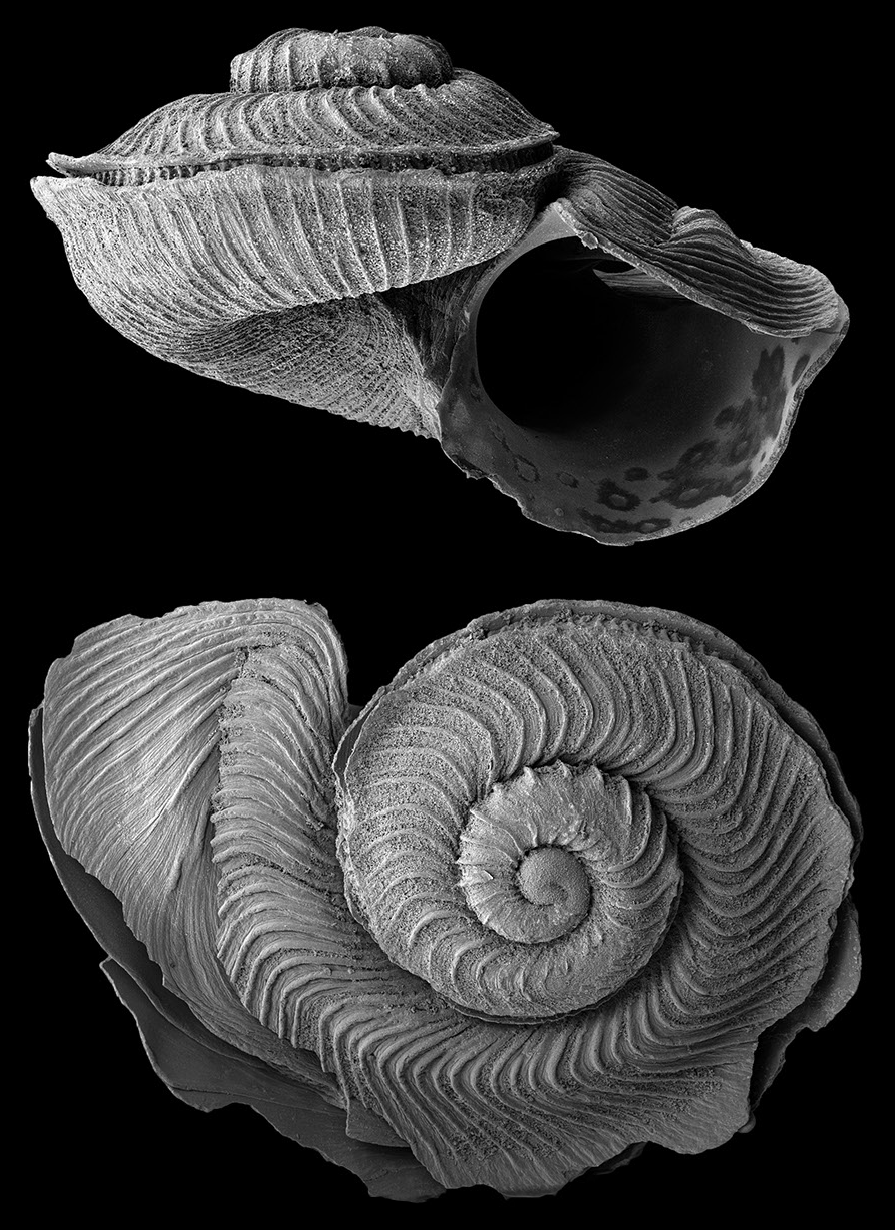
- Shell of Anatoma declivis (holotype)

Scientific classification
- Kingdom: Animalia
- Phylum: Mollusca
- Class: Gastropoda
- Subclass: Vetigastropoda
- Order: Lepetellida
- Superfamily: Scissurelloidea
- Family: Anatomidae
- Genus: Anatoma
- Species: A. declivis

Binomial name
- Anatoma declivis L. Hoffman, Kniesz, Martínez Arbizu & Kihara, 2022

= Anatoma declivis =

Species of gastropod

Anatoma declivis is a species of small sea snail, a marine gastropod mollusk or micromollusk in the family Anatomidae.

== Etymology ==
The species name ‘declivis’ refers to the sloping shoulders.

== Description ==
The protoconch consists of a single flat whorl with a pointed nucleus and coarsely pitted sculpture. The raised, sharp lip features a smooth, flexuous margin at the transition to the teleoconch, which is clearly marked by a change in shell sculpture. The diameter measures 0.20 mm.

The teleoconch exhibits a flattened apex and a biconical outline, with sloping, convex shoulders and prominently protruding margins along the selenizone. Flexuous axial ribs are present, and the aperture is round with a distinct slit. The suture is deeply impressed. The shell measures 1.19 mm in height and 1.90 mm in width, with the aperture height reaching 0.81 mm (67% of the total shell height). The colour is an opaque grayish white.

There are 2½ regularly coiled whorls, each with a convex shoulder area and a rounded base. The selenizone is located at the periphery, and the distance between the basal selenizone and the suture is minimal.

The base of the body whorl shows a few spiral cordlets. The umbilicus is open, narrow, tortuous, and deep, with a steep spiral keel leading towards the centre of the columellar callus.

The aperture is rounded at the base, columella, parietal area, and shoulder, while it becomes funnel-shaped at the selenizone and tapers to a point where it joins the penultimate whorl. The lip is sharp and flexuous, following the contours of the external ribs, notably protruding over the shoulder area and at the columella. A thin, reclining callus is present on the parietal region. The lower lip is disk-shaped.

The slit is located at the periphery, extending approximately one-quarter of a whorl in depth, flanked above and below by flattened, sharp margins. The lip’s junction aligns precisely with the penultimate whorl. The callus remains thin throughout, and the interior of the aperture is smooth.

Animal: The snout is smooth, broad, and flattened, terminating in two symmetrical anterior lobes. Eyes are absent. A pair of tapered cephalic tentacles is present, each bearing eight rounded, deeply folded lobes; the tips are blunt and non-papillate. The foot is small and, when contracted, displays an irregular surface texture. Three epipodial appendages are present on the left side. This article incorporates text from this source, which is available under the CC BY-SA 4.0 license.

== Distribution ==
This species occurs in the Lower Indian Bathyal Province at a depth of 2980 m.
