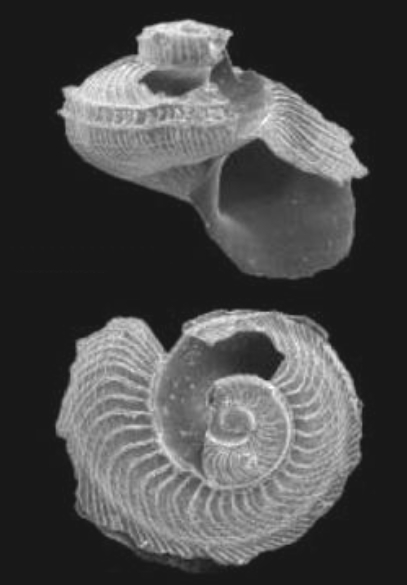
- Shell of Anatoma janusa (paratype at the Natural History Museum Rotterdam)

Scientific classification
- Kingdom: Animalia
- Phylum: Mollusca
- Class: Gastropoda
- Subclass: Vetigastropoda
- Order: Lepetellida
- Superfamily: Scissurelloidea
- Family: Anatomidae
- Genus: Anatoma
- Species: A. janusa

Binomial name
- Anatoma janusa Geiger, 2012

= Anatoma janusa =

Species of gastropod

Anatoma janusa is a species of small sea snail, a marine gastropod mollusk or micromollusk in the family Anatomidae.

== Description ==
The length of the shell attains 1.1 mm.

== Distribution ==
This species occurs in the Atlantic Ocean off the Azores.
