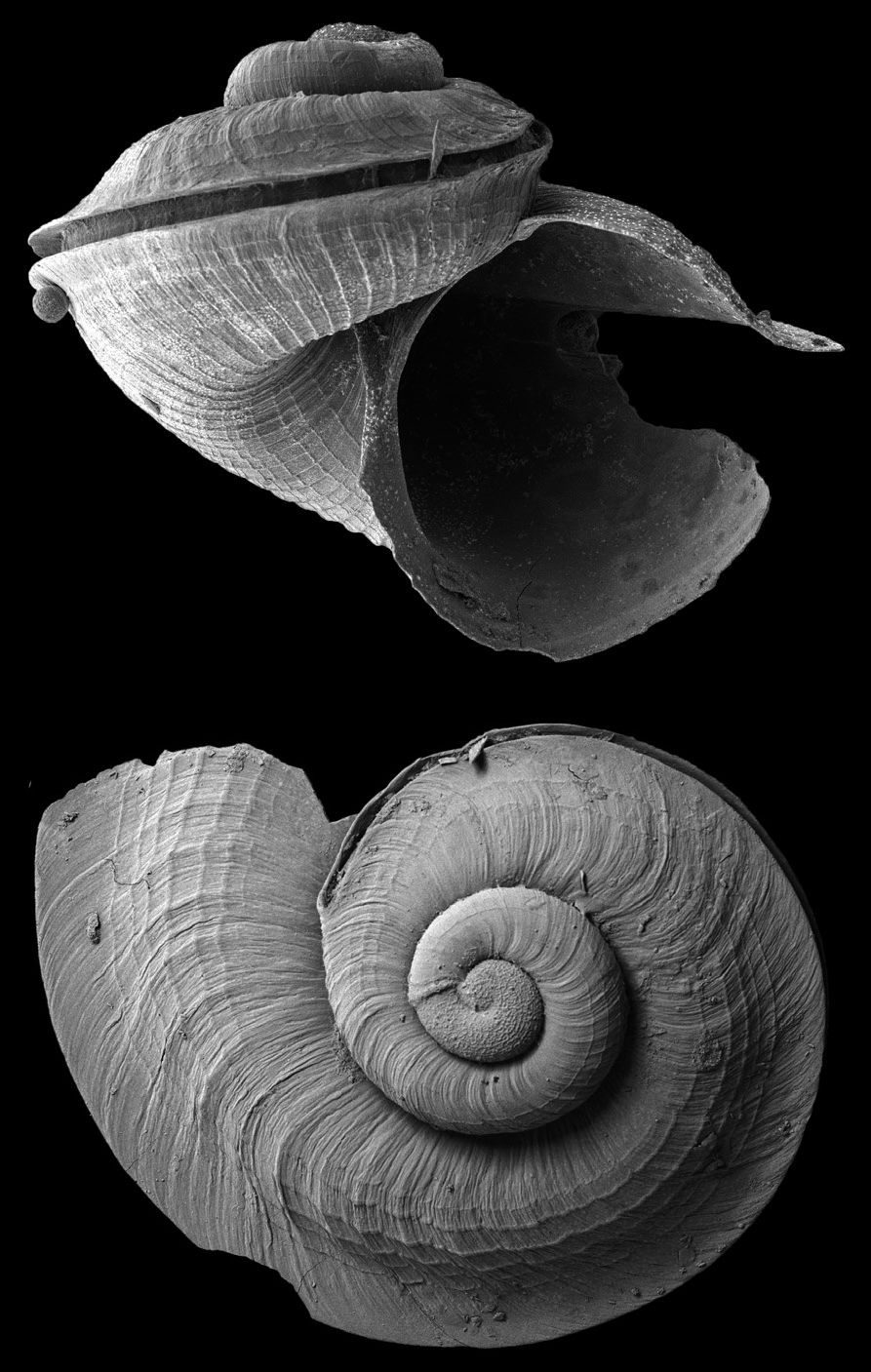
- Shell of Anatoma paucisculpta (holotype)

Scientific classification
- Kingdom: Animalia
- Phylum: Mollusca
- Class: Gastropoda
- Subclass: Vetigastropoda
- Order: Lepetellida
- Superfamily: Scissurelloidea
- Family: Anatomidae
- Genus: Anatoma
- Species: A. paucisculpta

Binomial name
- Anatoma paucisculpta L. Hoffman, Kniesz, Martínez Arbizu & Kihara, 2022

= Anatoma paucisculpta =

Species of gastropod

Anatoma paucisculpta is a species of small sea snail, a marine gastropod mollusk or micromollusk in the family Anatomidae.

== Etymology ==
The species name ‘paucisculpta’ refers to inconspicuous sculpture on the shell

== Description ==
The protoconch is composed of a single, slightly elevated whorl with an evenly rounded profile. The surface is ornamented with small, irregularly oriented, straight or curved short ridges and a few spiral striae. A smooth, straight rim is present near the margin, and the lip is sharp and flexuous, with a distinct protrusion at the periphery. The transition to the teleoconch is clearly marked by a change in sculpture. The protoconch measures 0.21 mm in diameter.

The teleoconch exhibits an elevated spire and swollen whorls, each bearing prominently protruding margins along the selenizone. Fine spiral cordlets are present. The aperture is rounded and features a distinct slit, while the suture is deep and well-defined. Shell measurements are 1.0 mm in height and 1.2 mm in width, with the aperture height measuring 0.7 mm (70% of the total shell height). The shell is translucent grayish white in colour.

There are 2¼ regularly coiled whorls, characterized by a convex shoulder area and a rounded base, with the selenizone positioned slightly above the periphery. The base of the body whorl has a smooth background adorned with approximately 20 irregularly spaced spiral cordlets and around 60 regularly arranged axial riblets. Both the spiral and axial sculpture are more pronounced in the umbilical region.

The umbilicus is open, tortuous, and deep, featuring a steep, smoothly curved spiral keel that terminates at the base of the columellar callus.

The aperture features a semi-circular, rounded base and is funnel-shaped as it approaches the selenizone, with a convex shoulder and a pointed junction where it meets the penultimate whorl. The parietal and columellar sides are well rounded. The lip is sharp and protruding, running obliquely along the columella; a minor rib forms a V-shape where it joins the columellar keel. Toward the base and parietal area, the lip is rounded and bears a thin callus. The slit extends one-quarter of a whorl in depth, bordered above and below by flattened, sharp margins. The lip is prosocline, with its union perpendicular to the penultimate whorl. The callus remains thin, and the interior of the aperture is smooth. This article incorporates text from this source, which is available under the CC BY-SA 4.0 license.

== Distribution ==
This species occurs in the Central and SE Indian Ridge at depths between 2469–3296 m.
