= Anatoma kopua =

Scientific classification
- Kingdom: Animalia
- Phylum: Mollusca
- Class: Gastropoda
- Subclass: Vetigastropoda
- Order: Lepetellida
- Superfamily: Scissurelloidea
- Family: Anatomidae
- Genus: Anatoma
- Species: A. kopua

Binomial name
- Anatoma kopua Geiger & B.A. Marshall, 2012

Species of gastropod

Anatoma kopua is a species of small sea snail, a marine gastropod mollusc or micromollusc in the family Anatomidae.

== Description ==
The height of the shell attains 4.58 mm, its diameter 4.27 mm.

== Distribution ==
This marine species occurs off New South Wales, Australia and New Zealand, Lord Howe Rise and Challenger Plateau, approximately at 1000 m.
