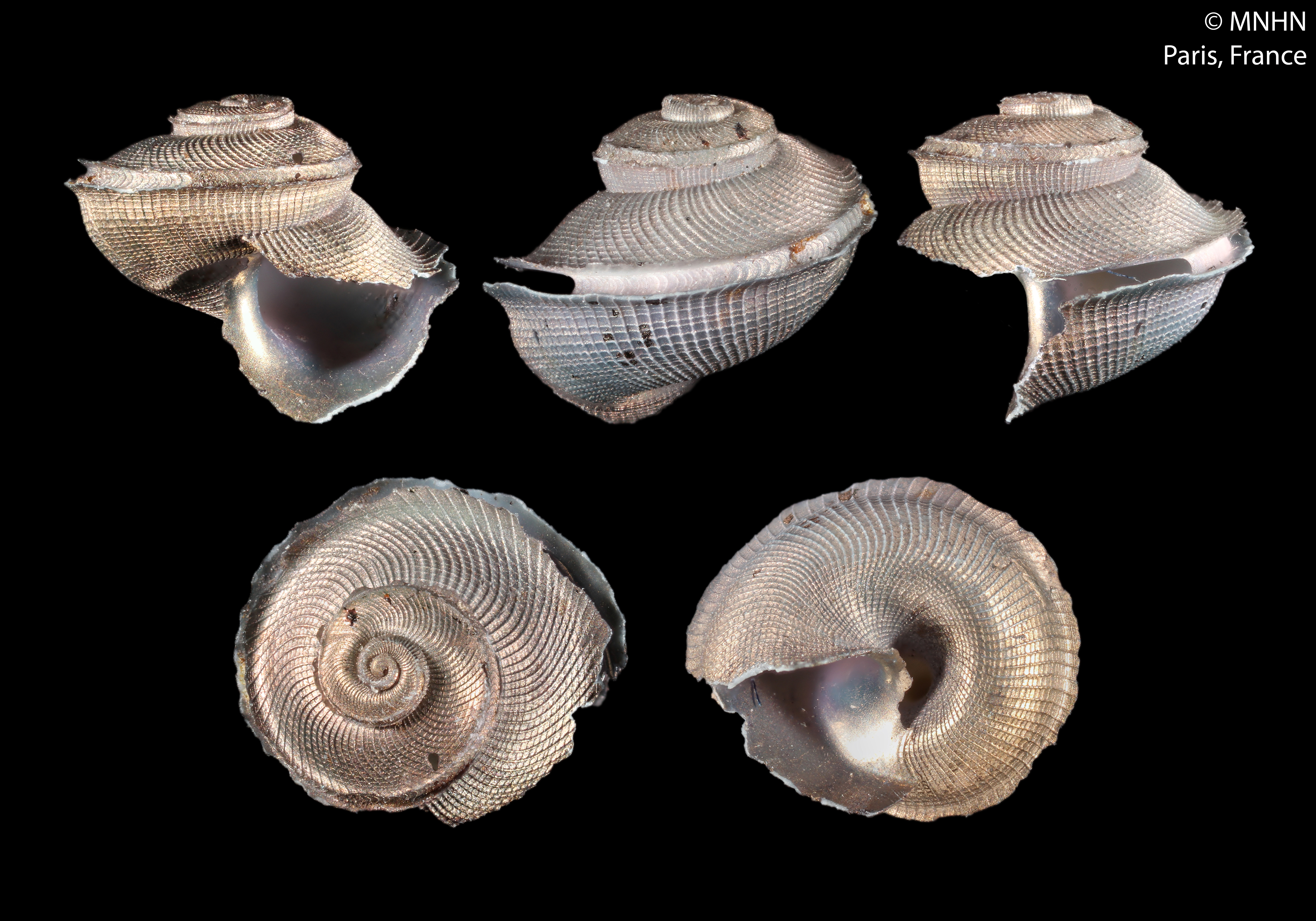
- Shell of Anatoma boucheti (holotype at MNHN, Paris)

Scientific classification
- Kingdom: Animalia
- Phylum: Mollusca
- Class: Gastropoda
- Subclass: Vetigastropoda
- Order: Lepetellida
- Family: Anatomidae
- Genus: Anatoma
- Species: A. boucheti

Binomial name
- Anatoma boucheti Geiger & Sasaki, 2008

= Anatoma boucheti =

Species of gastropod

Anatoma boucheti is a species of small sea snail, a marine gastropod mollusc or micromollusc in the family Anatomidae.

== Description ==
The length of the shell attains 2.85 mm.

== Distribution ==
This species occurs in the Indian Ocean off Réunion.
