= Anatoma georgii =

Scientific classification
- Kingdom: Animalia
- Phylum: Mollusca
- Class: Gastropoda
- Subclass: Vetigastropoda
- Order: Lepetellida
- Family: Anatomidae
- Genus: Anatoma
- Species: A. georgii

Binomial name
- Anatoma georgii D. L. Geiger, 2017

Species of gastropod

Anatoma georgii is a species of sea snail, a marine gastropod mollusc in the family Anatomidae.

The holotype is registered at the Santa Barbara Museum of Natural History.

== Distribution ==
This species occurs off Admiralty Island, Hawk Inlet, Alaska
