= Anatoma philippinica =

Scientific classification
- Kingdom: Animalia
- Phylum: Mollusca
- Class: Gastropoda
- Subclass: Vetigastropoda
- Order: Lepetellida
- Family: Anatomidae
- Genus: Anatoma
- Species: A. philippinica

Binomial name
- Anatoma philippinica Bandel, 1998

Synonyms
- Hainella philippinica Bandel, 1998

Species of gastropod

Anatoma philippinica is a species of a minute sea snail, a marine gastropod mollusk in the family Anatomidae.

== Description ==
The shell grows to a height of 0.9 mm.

== Distribution ==
This marine species occurs off the Philippines, Fiji, and Japan.
