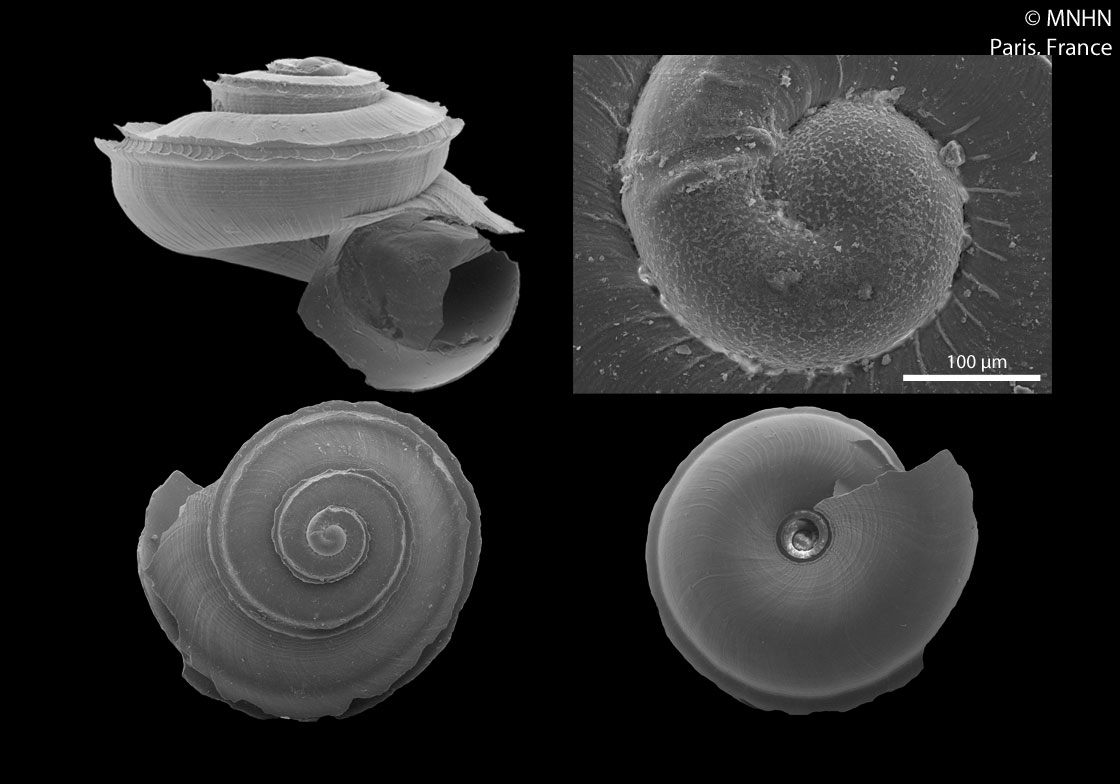
- Shell of Anatoma hyposculpta (holotype at MNHN, Paris)

Scientific classification
- Kingdom: Animalia
- Phylum: Mollusca
- Class: Gastropoda
- Subclass: Vetigastropoda
- Order: Lepetellida
- Superfamily: Scissurelloidea
- Family: Anatomidae
- Genus: Anatoma
- Species: A. hyposculpta

Binomial name
- Anatoma hyposculpta Geiger, 2012

= Anatoma hyposculpta =

Species of gastropod

Anatoma hyposculpta is a species of small sea snail, a marine gastropod mollusk or micromollusk in the family Anatomidae.

== Description ==
The length of the shell attains 2.2 mm.

== Distribution ==
This species occurs in the Pacific off Fiji.
