= Anatoma tenuis =

Scientific classification
- Kingdom: Animalia
- Phylum: Mollusca
- Class: Gastropoda
- Subclass: Vetigastropoda
- Order: Lepetellida
- Superfamily: Scissurelloidea
- Family: Anatomidae
- Genus: Anatoma
- Species: A. tenuis

Binomial name
- Anatoma tenuis (Jeffreys, 1877)

Synonyms
- Anatoma josephinae (Odhner, 1960); Scissurella josephinae Odhner, 1960; Scissurella tenuis Jeffreys, 1877

Species of sea snail in the family Anatomidae

Anatoma tenuis is a species of small sea snail, a marine gastropod mollusk or micromollusk in the family Anatomidae.

== Description ==
(Original description) The shell forms a depressed cone with an expanded base, sloping to the periphery and slit. It is very thin, scarcely semi-transparent, and rather glossy.

The sculpture consists of extremely numerous and fine curved longitudinal striae, and equally numerous and fine concentric or spiral striae. Their intersection creates a regular but minute cancellation. The concentric striae at the base are stronger and more distinct than the longitudinal striae. This sculpture is, of course, interrupted by the peripheral slit and groove.

The shell's color is pearl-white.

The spire is greatly depressed. There are 5 whorls, somewhat flattened below the suture. The body whorl enormously exceeds in size all the others put together.

The slit is central, long, and broad. The groove is also broad, marked across by regular but rather distant curved striae. Its edges are sharp and upturned.

The aperture is obliquely oval. The outer lip is thin, and the inner lip is folded back and curved. The columella is nearly straight, featuring a twisted fold in front of the small and narrow umbilicus.

== Distribution ==
This marine species occurs off the Atlantic Ocean off the Azores, Greenland and the Canary Islands; also off the Virgin Islands.
