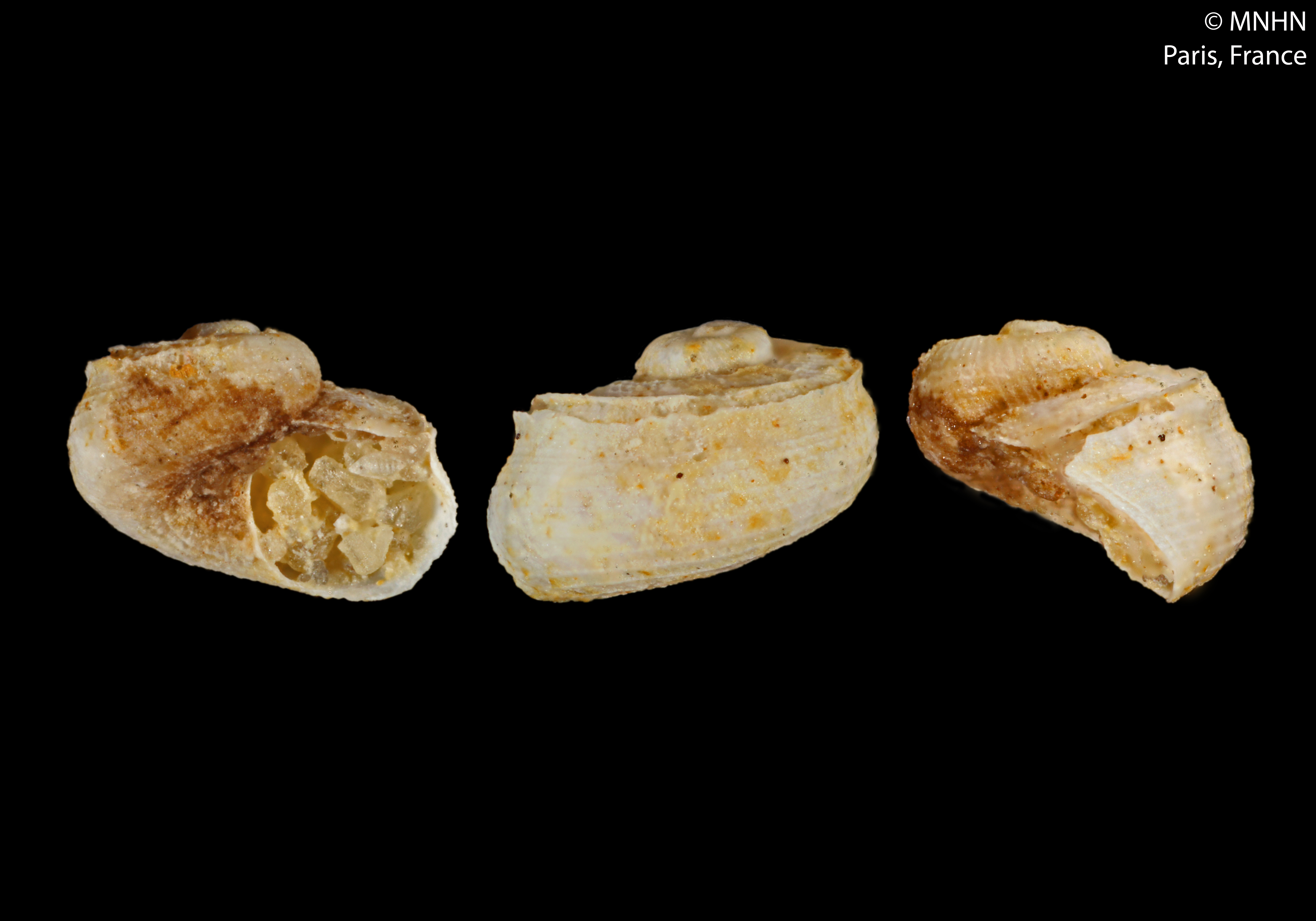
- shell of Scissurella deshayesi (Msyntype at MNHN, Paris)

Scientific classification
- Kingdom: Animalia
- Phylum: Mollusca
- Class: Gastropoda
- Subclass: Vetigastropoda
- Order: Lepetellida
- Superfamily: Scissurelloidea
- Family: Scissurellidae
- Genus: Scissurella d'Orbigny, 1824

Type species
- Scissurella laevigata d'Orbigny, 1824

Synonyms
- Maxwellella Bandel, 1998; †Praescissurella Lozouet, 1998; †Reussella Bandel, 1998; Schismope Jeffreys, 1856; Woodwardia Crosse & P. Fischer, 1861

= Scissurella =

Genus of gastropods

Scissurella is a genus of minute sea snails, marine gastropod molluscs in the family Scissurellidae, the small slit snails.

== Species ==
According to the World Register of Marine Species (WoRMS), the following species with valid names are included within the genus Scissurella :

- Scissurella alto Geiger, 2003
- † Scissurella apudornata Laws, 1935
- Scissurella azorensis Nolt, 2008
- † Scissurella bituminata Beets, 1942
- Scissurella bountyensis Powell, 1933
- Scissurella cebuana (Bandel, 1998)
- Scissurella clathrata Strebel, 1908
- † Scissurella condita Laws, 1939
- Scissurella costata d'Orbigny, 1824
- Scissurella cyprina Cotton & Godfrey, 1938
- † Scissurella depontaillieri Cossmann, 1879
- † Scissurella deshayesi Munier-Chalmas, 1862
- Scissurella electilis Montouchet, 1972 (taxon inquirendum)
- Scissurella enriquevidali Fernández-Garcés, Geiger, Rolán & Luque, 2021
- Scissurella evaensis Bandel, 1998
- Scissurella georgica Davolos & Moolenbeek, 2005
- Scissurella jucunda E.A. Smith, 1890
- Scissurella kaiserae Geiger, 2006
- Scissurella lobini (Burnay & Rolan, 1990)
- Scissurella lorenzi Geiger, 2006
- Scissurella manawatawhia Powell, 1937
- Scissurella maraisorum Geiger, 2006
- Scissurella mirifica (A. Adams, 1862)
- Scissurella morretesi Montouchet, 1972
- † Scissurella nesbittae Geiger & Goedert, 2020
- † Scissurella novozeelandica (Bandel, 1998)
- Scissurella obliqua Watson, 1886
- Scissurella ornata May, 1908
- Scissurella petermannensis Lamy, 1910
- Scissurella phenax Geiger, 2012
- Scissurella prendrevillei Powell, 1933
- Scissurella quadrata Geiger & Jansen, 2004
- Scissurella redferni (Rolán, 1996)
- Scissurella regalis Geiger & B.A. Marshall, 2012
- Scissurella reticulata Philippi, 1853
- Scissurella rota Yaron, 1983
- Scissurella skeneoides Geiger, 2012
- Scissurella spinosa Geiger & Jansen, 2004
- Scissurella staminea (A. Adams, 1862)
- Scissurella sudanica Bandel, 1998
- Scissurella supraplicata E.A. Smith, 1875
- † Scissurella transylvanica Reuss, 1860
- Scissurella xandaros Geiger, 2012

Species in the genus Scissurella include:

- Scissurella caliana Dall, 1919
- Scissurella lacuniformis Watson, 1886
- Scissurella lamellata (A. Adams, 1862)
- Scissurella soyoae (Habe, 1951)

Nomina dubia

- Scissurella alexandrei Montouchet, 1972
- Scissurella coronata Watson, 1886
- Scissurella dalli Bartsch, 1903
- Scissurella dohrniana (Dunker, 1861)
- Scissurella hoernesi Semper, 1865 (synonym of Sinezona ferriezi (Crosse, 1867))
- Scissurella koeneni Semper, 1865
- Scissurella mantelli Woodward, 1859
- Scissurella minuta Turton, 1932

Species brought into synonymy

- Scissurella aedonia Watson, 1886: synonym of Anatoma aedonia (Watson, 1886)
- Scissurella aetheria Melvill & Standen, 1903: synonym of Anatoma aetheria (Melvill & Standen, 1903)
- † Scissurella affinis O. G. Costa, 1861 : synonym of Anatoma aspera (Philippi, 1844)
- Scissurella africana Barnard, 1963: synonym of Anatoma africana (Barnard, 1963)
- Scissurella agulhasensis Thiele, 1925: synonym of Anatoma agulhasensis (Thiele, 1925)
- Scissurella alta Watson, 1886: synonym of Anatoma alta (Watson, 1886)
- Scissurella amoena Thiele, 1912: synonym of Anatoma amoena (Thiele, 1912)
- Scissurella angulata Lovén, 1846: synonym of Anatoma crispata (Fleming, 1828)
- Scissurella argutecostata Seguenza, 1877: synonym of Anatoma tenuisculpta (Seguenza, 1877)
- Scissurella aspera Philippi, 1844: synonym of Anatoma aspera (Philippi, 1844)
- Scissurella atkinsoni Tenison Woods, 1876: synonym of Sukashitrochus atkinsoni (Tenison Woods, 1876)
- Scissurella australis Hedley, 1903: synonym of Anatoma australis (Hedley, 1903)
- Scissurella bertheloti d'Orbigny, 1839: synonym of Anatoma bertheloti (d'Orbigny, 1840) (nomen dubium)
- Scissurella cancellata Jeffreys, 1856: synonym of Scissurella costata d'Orbigny, 1824
- Scissurella carinata A. Adams, 1862: synonym of Sukashitrochus carinatus (A. Adams, 1862)
- Scissurella chiricova Dall, 1919: synonym of Anatoma chiricova (Dall, 1919)
- Scissurella cingulata O. G. Costa, 1861 - belt scissurelle: synonym of Sinezona cingulata (O.G. Costa, 1861)
- Scissurella columbiana (Bandel, 1998): synonym of Sinezona confusa Rolán & Luque, 1994
- Scissurella concinna G. B. Sowerby I, 1831: synonym of Sinezona concinna (G. B. Sowerby I, 1831) (nomen dubium)
- Scissurella conica d'Orbigny, 1841: synonym of Anatoma conica (d'Orbigny, 1841)
- Scissurella crispata Fleming, 1828: synonym of Anatoma crispata (Fleming, 1828)
- Scissurella decipiens O.G. Costa, 1861: synonym of Scissurella costata d'Orbigny, 1824
- Scissurella declinans Watson, 1886: synonym of Scissurella mirifica (A. Adams, 1862)
- † Scissurella decussata d'Orbigny, 1824: synonym of Scissurella costata d'Orbigny, 1824
- Scissurella disciformis Golikov & Sirenko, 1980: synonym of Anatoma disciformis (Golikov & Sirenko, 1980)
- Scissurella dorbignyii Audouin, 1826: synonym of Sukashitrochus dorbignyi (Audouin, 1826)
- Scissurella dorbignyi Scacchi, 1836: synonym of Scissurella costata d'Orbigny, 1824
- Scissurella elatior G. B. Sowerby I, 1831: synonym of Anatoma crispata (Fleming, 1828)
- Scissurella elegans d'Orbigny, 1824: synonym of Scissurella costata d'Orbigny, 1824
- Scissurella epicharis McLean, 1970: synonym of Anatoma keenae (McLean, 1970)
- Scissurella equatoria Hedley, 1899: synonym of Anatoma equatoria (Hedley, 1899)
- Scissurella eucharista Melvill & Standen, 1912: synonym of Scissurella clathrata Strebel, 1908
- Scissurella euglypta Pelseneer, 1903: synonym of Anatoma euglypta (Pelseneer, 1903)
- Scissurella eximia Seguenza, 1877: synonym of Anatoma eximia (Seguenza, 1877)
- Scissurella exquisita Schepman, 1908: synonym of Anatoma exquisita (Schepman, 1908)
- Scissurella fairchildi Powell, 1933: synonym of Scissurella prendrevillei Powell, 1933
- Scissurella funnazzensis de Gregorio, 1889: synonym of Anatoma tenuisculpta (Seguenza, 1877)
- † Scissurella geoffreyi Laws, 1940: synonym of Incisura geoffreyi (Laws, 1940) (original combination)
- Scissurella jacksoni Melvill, 1904: synonym of Anatoma jacksoni (Melvill, 1904)
- Scissurella josephinae Odhner, 1960: synonym of Anatoma josephinae (Odhner, 1960)
- Scissurella jucunda E. A. Smith, 1910: synonym of Scissurella jucunda E. A. Smith, 1890 (invalid: junior homonym of Scissurella jucunda E. A. Smith, 1890; S. smithi is a replacement name)
- Scissurella keenae McLean, 1970: synonym of Anatoma keenae (McLean, 1970)
- Scissurella kelseyi Dall, 1905: synonym of Thieleella kelseyi (Dall, 1905)
- Scissurella laevigata d'Orbigny, 1824: synonym of Scissurella costata d'Orbigny, 1824
- Scissurella lyra S. S. Berry, 1947 - lyre scissurelle: synonym of Anatoma lyra (S. Berry, 1947)
- Scissurella lyttleltonensis E.A. Smith, 1894: synonym of Incisura lytteltonensis (E.A. Smith, 1894)
- Scissurella malvinarum Zelaya & Geiger, 2007: synonym of Scissurella clathrata Strebel, 1908
- Scissurella marshalli Bandel, 1998: synonym of Scissurella prendrevillei Powell, 1933
- Scissurella maxima Schepman, 1908: synonym of Anatoma maxima (Schepman, 1908)
- Scissurella medioplicata Thiele, 1925: synonym of Scissurella petermannensis Lamy, 1910
- Scissurella miranda A. Adams, 1862: synonym of Sukashitrochus mirandus (A. Adams, 1862)
- Scissurella modesta A. Adams, 1862: synonym of Sinezona modesta (A. Adams, 1862)
- Scissurella munieri P. Fischer, 1862: synonym of Anatoma munieri (P. Fischer, 1862)
- Scissurella obtusata Golikov & Gulbin, 1978: synonym of Anatoma obtusata (Golikov & Gulbin, 1978)
- Scissurella padangensis Thiele, 1912: synonym of Sinezona ferriezi (Crosse, 1867)
- Scissurella palaeomphaloides Nordsieck, 1974: synonym of Anatoma crispata (Fleming, 1828)
- Scissurella paumotuensis Garrett, 1872: synonym of Sinezona paumotuensis (Garrett, 1872)
- Scissurella plicata Philippi, 1836: synonym of Scissurella costata d'Orbigny, 1824
- † Scissurella praecrispata Gougerot & Le Renard, 1978: synonym of † Praescissurella praecrispata (Gougerot & Le Renard, 1977) (superseded combination)
- Scissurella proxima Dall, 1927 - Florida scissurelle: synonym of Anatoma proxima (Dall, 1927)
- Scissurella pseudoequatoria Kay, 1979: synonym of Anatoma pseudoequatoria (Kay, 1979)
- Scissurella regia Mestayer, 1916: synonym of Anatoma regia (Mestayer, 1916)
- Scissurella richardi Dautzenberg & H. Fischer, 1896: synonym of Anatoma tenuis (Jeffreys, 1877)
- Scissurella rimuloides Carpenter, 1865: synonym of Sinezona rimuloides (Carpenter, 1865)
- Scissurella rosea Hedley, 1904: synonym of Incisura rosea (Hedley, 1904)
- Scissurella sagamiana Okutani, 1964: synonym of Thieleella sagamiana (Okutani, 1964)
- Scissurella smithi Thiele, 1912: synonym of Scissurella jucunda E. A. Smith, 1890
- Scissurella stellae Fleming, 1948: synonym of Scissurella prendrevillei Powell, 1933
- Scissurella striatula Philippi, 1844: synonym of Scissurella costata d'Orbigny, 1824
- † Scissurella subaspera Boettger, 1907: synonym of Anatoma tenuisculpta (Seguenza, 1877)
- Scissurella tabulata Watson, 1886: synonym of Anatoma tabulata (Barnard, 1964)
- Scissurella tenuis Jeffreys, 1877: synonym of Anatoma tenuis (Jeffreys, 1877)
- Scissurella tenuisculpta Seguenza, 1877: synonym of Anatoma tenuisculpta (Seguenza, 1877)
- Scissurella timora Melvill & Standen, 1912: synonym of Scissurella petermannensis Lamy, 1910
- Scissurella umbilicata Jeffreys, 1883: synonym of Anatoma umbilicata (Jeffreys, 1883)
