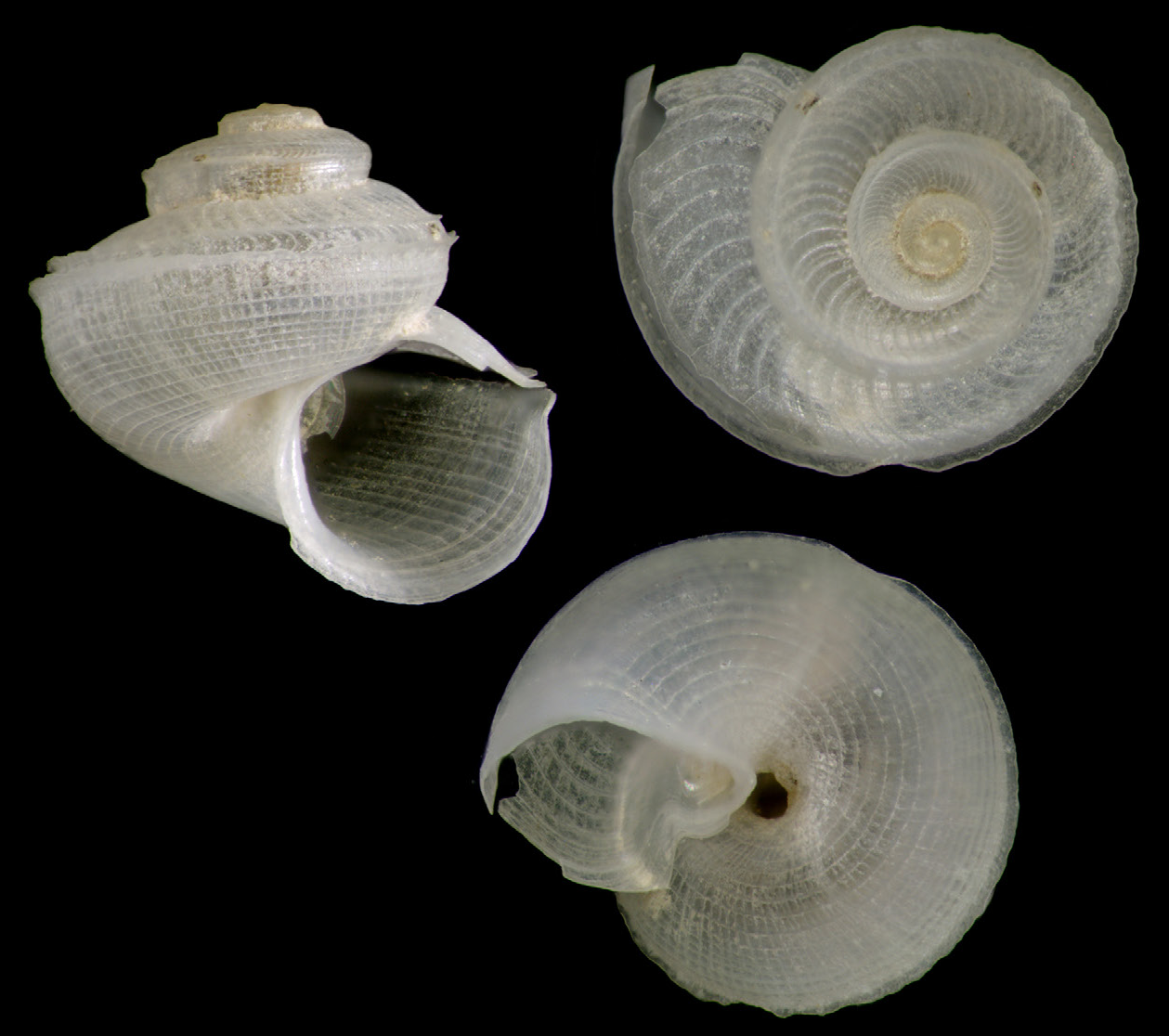

Scientific classification
- Kingdom: Animalia
- Phylum: Mollusca
- Class: Gastropoda
- Subclass: Vetigastropoda
- Order: Lepetellida
- Superfamily: Scissurelloidea
- Family: Anatomidae
- Genus: Anatoma
- Species: A. eximia

Binomial name
- Anatoma eximia (Seguenza, 1877)

Synonyms
- Scissurella eximia Seguenza, 1877

= Anatoma eximia =

Species of gastropod

Anatoma eximia is a species of small sea snail, a marine gastropod mollusk or micromollusk in the family Anatomidae.

== Description ==
(Original description in Italian) This beautiful species is larger than Anatoma crispata (Fleming, 1828), and it differs from it in many characteristics. The anterior region of the body whorl is much more convex and elegantly reticulated by radial ribs and by girdles (cingula) equal to them, both of which are extremely slender and very closely spaced in the previous species. The umbilicus is reduced to a simple umbilical fissure, whereas in A. crispata, the surrounding region gradually sinks to form an enlarged umbilicus. The slit on the keel extends for more than a quarter of the body whorl; the rim is encircled by two slightly projecting lamellae, which are, however, very prominent in A. crispata and Anatoma aspera (Philippi, 1844). The posterior region of the whorls is flattened-convex, while in the other species, it is strongly convex. The curved ribs follow the pattern of those in the anterior region in both form and spacing, but on that surface, only faint traces of spiral lines are discernible.

== Distribution ==
This species occurs in the Atlantic Ocean off Portuga, Spain, Morocco, Western Sahara and Mauritania.
