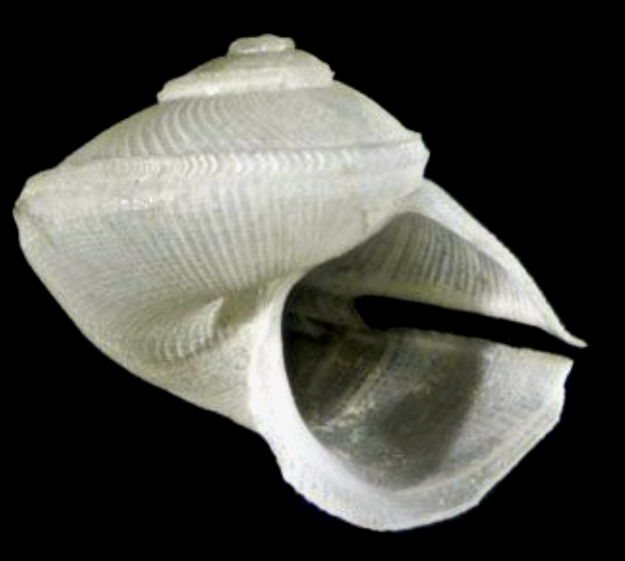
- Shell of Anatoma tenuisculpta (specimen at the Natural History Museum Rotterdam)

Scientific classification
- Kingdom: Animalia
- Phylum: Mollusca
- Class: Gastropoda
- Subclass: Vetigastropoda
- Order: Lepetellida
- Superfamily: Scissurelloidea
- Family: Anatomidae
- Genus: Anatoma
- Species: A. tenuisculpta

Binomial name
- Anatoma tenuisculpta (Seguenza, 1877)

Synonyms
- Scissurella argutecostata Seguenza, 1877; Scissurella funnazzensis de Gregorio, 1889; † Scissurella subaspera Boettger, 1907; Scissurella tenuisculpta Seguenza, 1877

= Anatoma tenuisculpta =

Species of gastropod

Anatoma tenuisculpta is a species of small sea snail, a marine gastropod mollusk or micromollusk in the family Anatomidae.

== Description ==
The length of the shell attains 4 mm, its diameter 3.8 mm.

(Original description in Italian) This distinct form is larger than Anatoma eximia (Seguenza, 1877), alongside which it is found and from which it is easily distinguished because, in its general shape, it is less globose, the spire is less elevated, the posterior part of the whorls is more convex, the anterior part is very short, and the anterior region of the body whorl is only slightly swollen and almost equally as convex as the posterior.

The sculpture is extremely delicate: on the posterior region of the whorls, it consists of very fine oblique lines and finer spiral lines. On the anterior region of the body whorl, which bears an angle near the groove, the oblique lines continue with the same intensity, while the spiral lines are more distinct and widely spaced. The umbilicus is formed by a deep umbilical fissure. The aperture is rounded-angular.

== Distribution ==
This marine species occurs off Norway; in the Atlantic Ocean on the Rockall Trough; in the Mediterranean Sea off Italy.
