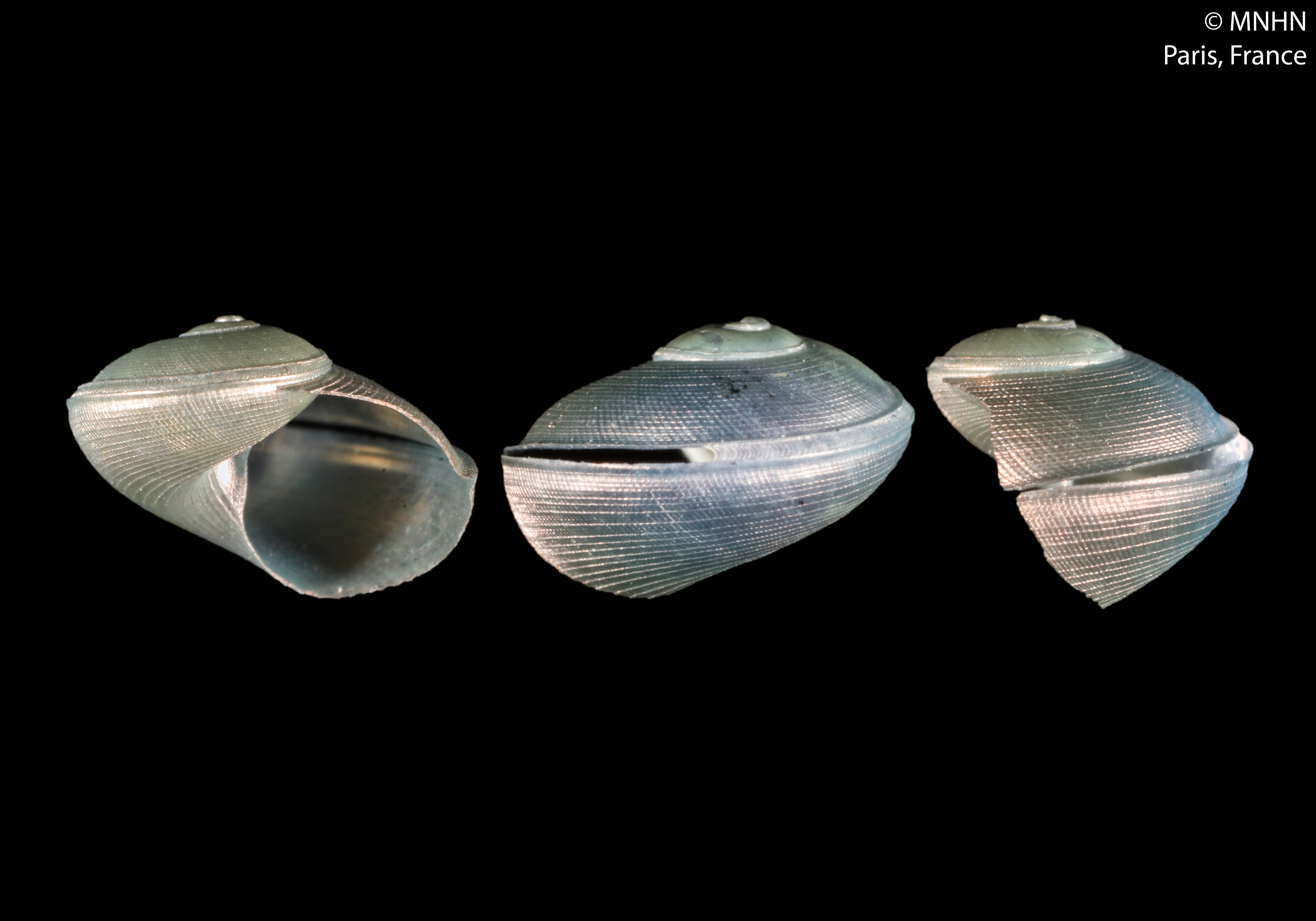
- Shell of Anatoma megascutula (holotype at MNHN, Paris)

Scientific classification
- Kingdom: Animalia
- Phylum: Mollusca
- Class: Gastropoda
- Subclass: Vetigastropoda
- Order: Lepetellida
- Superfamily: Scissurelloidea
- Family: Anatomidae
- Genus: Anatoma
- Species: A. megascutula

Binomial name
- Anatoma megascutula Geiger & B.A. Marshall, 2012

= Anatoma megascutula =

Species of gastropod

Anatoma megascutula is a species of small sea snail, a marine gastropod mollusc or micromollusc in the family Anatomidae.

== Description ==
The width of the shell attains 5.03 mm, its height 3.36 mm.

== Distribution ==
This marine species occurs in the South-western Pacific (Fiji, Tonga) and on the Norfolk Ridge and the Chatham Rise.
