= Anatoma kelseyi =

Scientific classification
- Kingdom: Animalia
- Phylum: Mollusca
- Class: Gastropoda
- Subclass: Vetigastropoda
- Order: Lepetellida
- Superfamily: Scissurelloidea
- Family: Anatomidae
- Genus: Anatoma
- Species: A. kelseyi

Binomial name
- Anatoma kelseyi (Dall, 1905)

Synonyms
- Anatoma chiricova (Dall, 1919); Scissurella (Schizotrochus) kelseyi Dall, 1905 (original combination); Scissurella chiricova Dall, 1919; Scissurella kelseyi Dall, 1905; Thieleella kelseyi (Dall, 1905)

Species of gastropod

Anatoma kelseyi is a species of small sea snail, a marine gastropod mollusc or micromollusk in the family Anatomidae.

== Description ==
The length of the shell attains 6 mm, its diameter 5.5 mm.

(Original description) The shell is large for the genus and trochiform, appearing white. It features about four rounded whorls, sculpted with fine, forwardly convex, arcuate threads or raised lines. Above the fasciole, these are spirally microscopically striate, while on the base, they become somewhat regularly spaced and stronger spirals. The fasciole is narrow, located slightly above the periphery, and bounded by two sharp, very thin, elevated keels. The slit extends about one-fifth of the circumference of the body whorl. The aperture is nearly circular, interrupted for a short distance by the body, with the inner lip slightly reflected over a small umbilicus. The operculum is multispiral and pale yellow.

== Distribution ==
This species occurs in the Pacific Ocean off San Diego, California, and Chirikof Island, Alaska.
