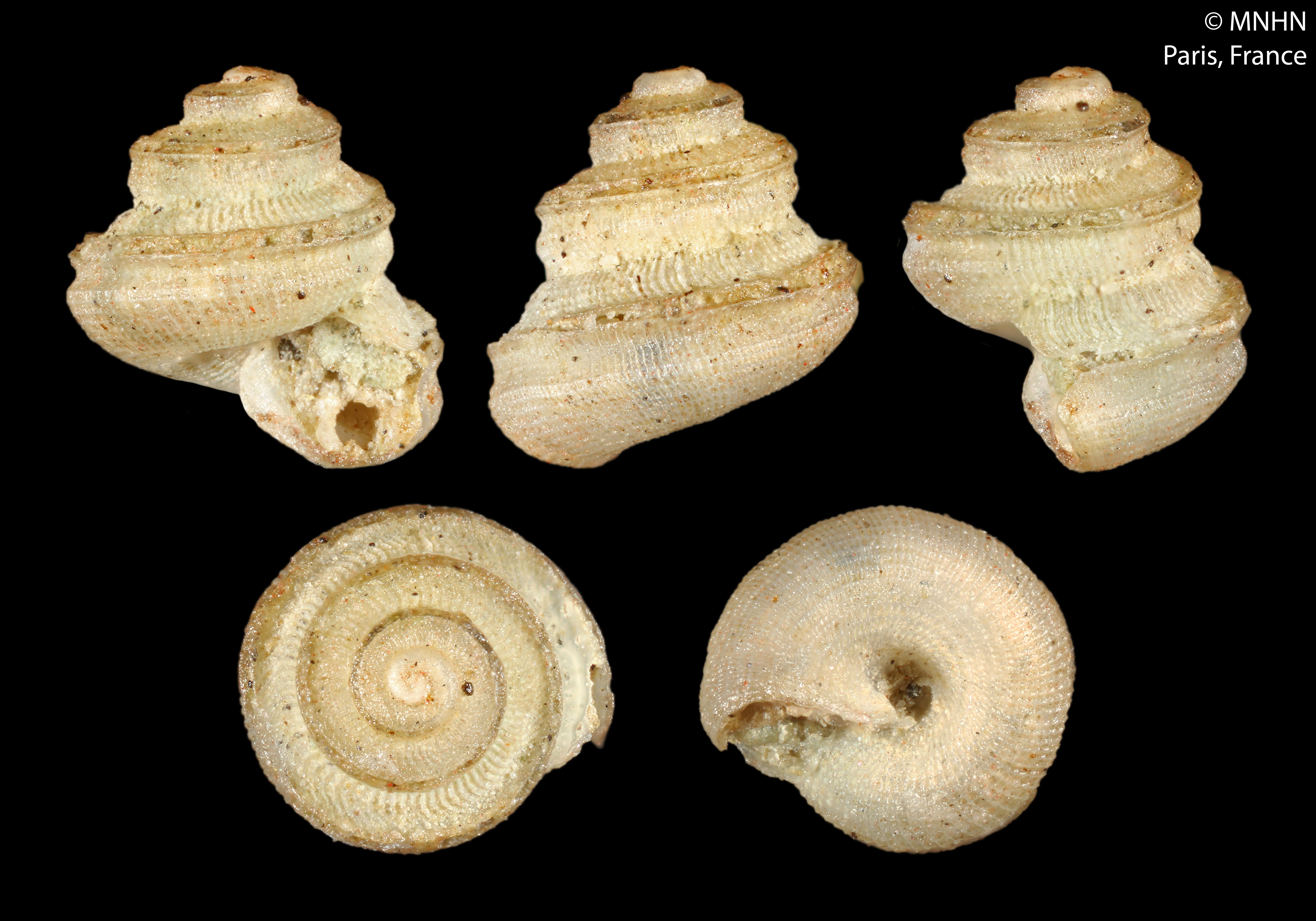
- Shell of Anatoma munieri (lectotype at MNHN, Paris)

Scientific classification
- Kingdom: Animalia
- Phylum: Mollusca
- Class: Gastropoda
- Subclass: Vetigastropoda
- Order: Lepetellida
- Superfamily: Scissurelloidea
- Family: Anatomidae
- Genus: Anatoma
- Species: A. munieri

Binomial name
- Anatoma munieri (P. Fischer, 1862)

Synonyms
- Anatoma jacksoni (Melvill, 1904); Anatomus turbinatus A. Adams, 1862; Scissurella jacksoni Melvill, 1904; Scissurella munieri P. Fischer, 1862 (original combination)

= Anatoma munieri =

Species of gastropod

Anatoma munieri is a species of minute sea snail, a marine gastropod mollusk or micromollusk in the family Anatomidae.

== Description ==
The size of the shell varies between 2 mm and 3 mm. The shell has a turbiniform shape. The umbilicus is deep perspective. The elevated spire contains four, a little convex, whorls. These are sculptured with longitudinal, close, radiating lamellae, angular in the middle, and little, elevated, transverse lines. The base of the shell is ornamented with concentric elevated lirae.

This species is elevately turbinate, with two conspicuous carinate whorls and a deep perspective umbilicus. The fine lamellae of the upper part of the whorls are bent or angulated in the middle.

== Distribution ==
This marine species occurs off the Philippines and Japan.
