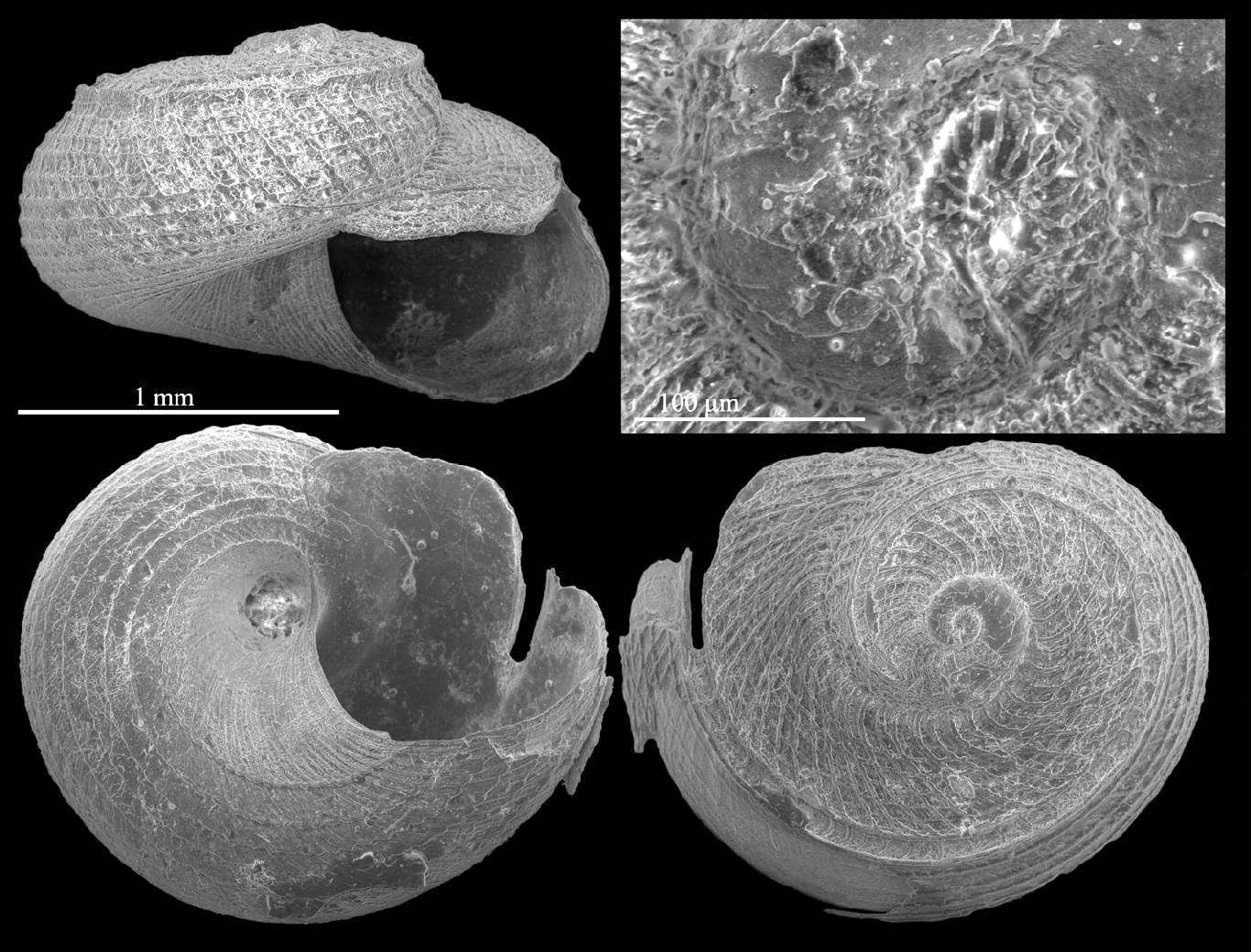
- Shell of Scissurella mirifica (syntype at the Natural History Museum, London)

Scientific classification
- Kingdom: Animalia
- Phylum: Mollusca
- Class: Gastropoda
- Subclass: Vetigastropoda
- Order: Lepetellida
- Superfamily: Scissurelloidea
- Family: Scissurellidae
- Genus: Scissurella
- Species: S. mirifica

Binomial name
- Scissurella mirifica (A. Adams, 1862)

Synonyms
- Anatomus mirificus A. Adams, 1862 (original combination); Scissurella declinans Watson, 1886

= Scissurella mirifica =

Species of gastropod

Scissurella mirifica is a species of small sea snail, a marine gastropod mollusk or micromollusk in the family Scissurellidae, the little slit snails.

== Description ==
The size of the shell varies between 1.2 mm and 2.5 mm. The depressed shell has an oval shape. The flattened spire has a very wide and open umbilicus. The entire surface of the 2½ whorls is regularly and delicately finely clathrate. The aperture is very oblique. The outer lip recedes inwards.

== Distribution ==
This marine species occurs off the Philippines, Indonesia, Papua New Guinea, Solomon Islands, Fiji and the Society Islands; off Queensland, Australia.
