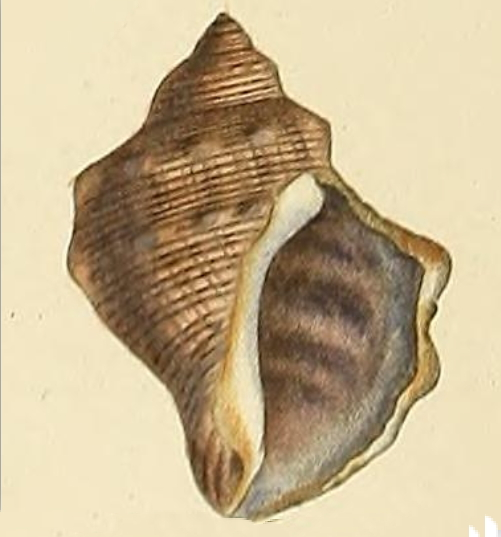
- Shell of Anatoma conica (holotype)

Scientific classification
- Kingdom: Animalia
- Phylum: Mollusca
- Class: Gastropoda
- Subclass: Vetigastropoda
- Order: Lepetellida
- Superfamily: Scissurelloidea
- Family: Anatomidae
- Genus: Anatoma
- Species: A. conica

Binomial name
- Anatoma conica (d'Orbigny, 1841)

Synonyms
- Scissurella conica d'Orbigny, 1841

= Anatoma conica =

Species of gastropod

Anatoma conica is a species of minute sea snail, a marine gastropod mollusk or micromollusk in the family Anatomidae.

== Description ==
The length of the shell attains 2 mm.

(Original description) The shell is orbiculate-conical, globular, and pellucid, transversely lamellose-ribbed. Its spire is elevated, with a broad keel. The aperture is rounded, and the umbilicus is large.

This species is elevated and somewhat conical, marked transversely with prominent, spaced, and flexuous lamellae or ribs that cover both the top and the bottom. Its aperture is deeply rounded, separated by a very prolonged fissure (slit), and bordered on each side by a simple crest.

== Distribution ==
This species occurs in the Atlantic Ocean off the Falkland Islands.
