= Anatoma disciformis =

Scientific classification
- Kingdom: Animalia
- Phylum: Mollusca
- Class: Gastropoda
- Subclass: Vetigastropoda
- Order: Lepetellida
- Superfamily: Scissurelloidea
- Family: Anatomidae
- Genus: Anatoma
- Species: A. disciformis

Binomial name
- Anatoma disciformis (Golikov & Sirenko, 1980)

Synonyms
- Scissurella disciformis Golikov & Sirenko, 1980

Species of gastropod

Anatoma disciformis is a species of minute sea snail, a marine gastropod mollusk or micromollusk in the family Anatomidae.

== Distribution ==
This species occurs in the Sea of Japan.
