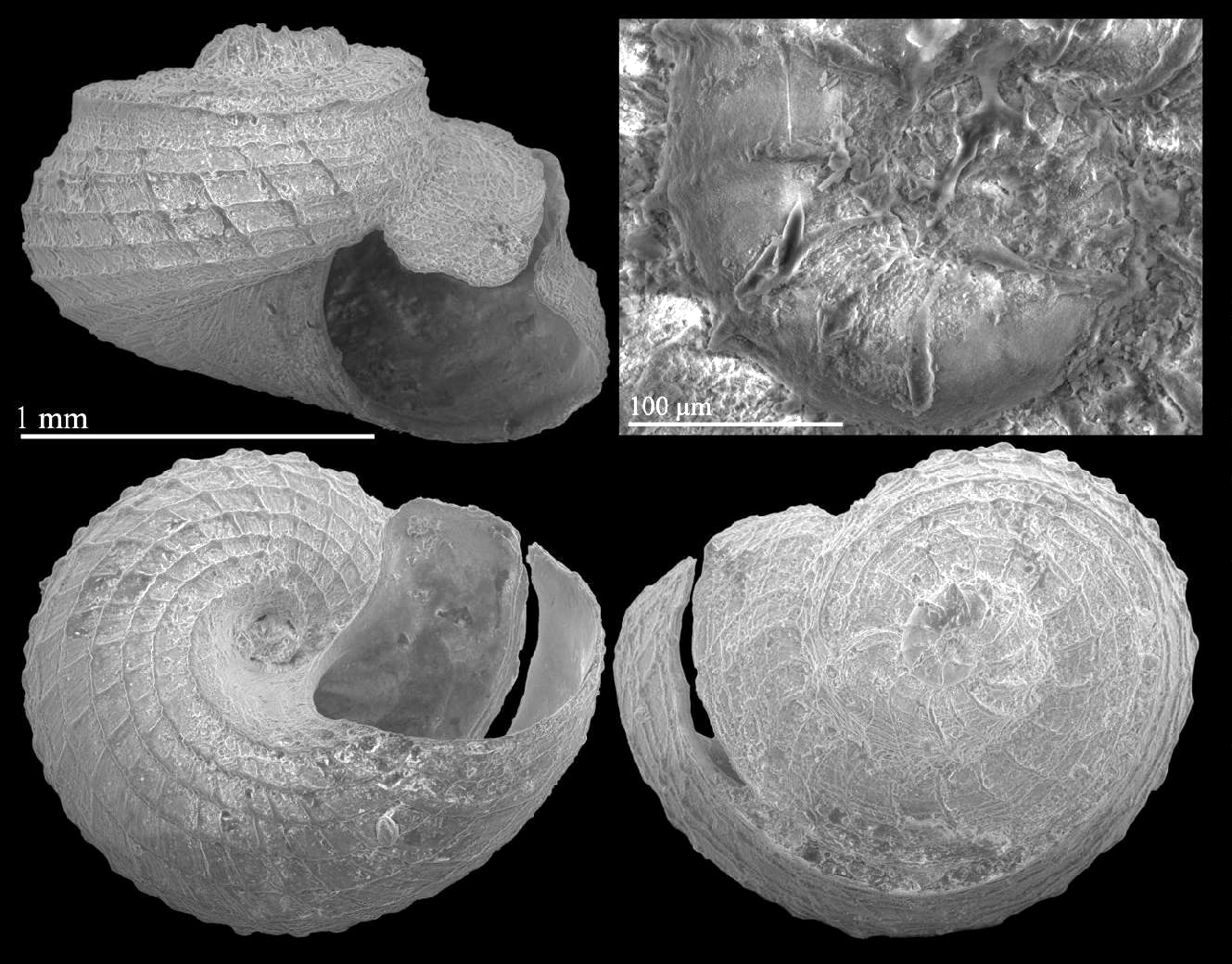
- Shell of Scissurella staminea (syntype at the Natural History Museum, London)

Scientific classification
- Kingdom: Animalia
- Phylum: Mollusca
- Class: Gastropoda
- Subclass: Vetigastropoda
- Order: Lepetellida
- Superfamily: Scissurelloidea
- Family: Scissurellidae
- Genus: Scissurella
- Species: S. staminea

Binomial name
- Scissurella staminea (A. Adams, 1862)

Synonyms
- Anatomus stamineus A. Adams, 1862

= Scissurella staminea =

Species of gastropod

Scissurella staminea is a species of minute sea snail, a marine gastropod mollusk or micromollusk in the family Scissurellidae, the little slit snails.

== Description ==
The shell grows to a height of 2 mm. The depressed shell has an ovate shape. The spire is plane. The umbilicus is moderate. The two whorls are nearly plane. They are broadly clathrate with thread-like elevated radiating lines, stronger below the carina, and concentric elevated striae. The umbilical region has elevated concentric lines. The aperture is rounded-ovate. The inner lip is receding.

This species is widely clathrate, with conspicuous thread-like radiating and concentric lines, the former of which assume on the spire a lamellar character.

== Distribution ==
This species occurs in the Western Pacific Ocean.
