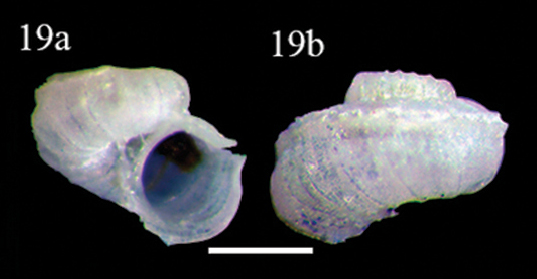
- Scissurella redferni 19a ventral view 19b dorsal view, scale bar 1 mm.

Scientific classification
- Kingdom: Animalia
- Phylum: Mollusca
- Class: Gastropoda
- Subclass: Vetigastropoda
- Order: Lepetellida
- Superfamily: Scissurelloidea
- Family: Scissurellidae
- Genus: Scissurella
- Species: S. redferni

Binomial name
- Scissurella redferni (Rolán, 1996)

Synonyms
- Sinezona redferni Rolán, 1996

= Scissurella redferni =

Species of gastropod

Scissurella redferni is a species of small sea snail, a marine gastropod mollusk or micromollusk in the family Scissurellidae, the little slit snails.

== Description ==
The shell grows to a width of 0.5-0.7 mm. It is turbiniform, with a low spire and whorls that are rounded and covered with irregular lamellas that are irregular and small.

== Distribution ==
This species occurs in the Atlantic Ocean off the Bahamas and in the Caribbean Sea off Cuba.
