= Anatoma tabulata =

Scientific classification
- Kingdom: Animalia
- Phylum: Mollusca
- Class: Gastropoda
- Subclass: Vetigastropoda
- Order: Lepetellida
- Superfamily: Scissurelloidea
- Family: Anatomidae
- Genus: Anatoma
- Species: A. tabulata

Binomial name
- Anatoma tabulata (Barnard, 1964)

Synonyms
- Scissurella tabulata Barnard, 1964

Species of gastropod

Anatoma tabulata is a species of small sea snail, a marine gastropod mollusk or micromollusk in the family Anatomidae.

== Distribution ==
This marine species occurs in the Indian Ocean off KwaZuluNatal, South Africa.
