= Scissurella ornata =

Scientific classification
- Kingdom: Animalia
- Phylum: Mollusca
- Class: Gastropoda
- Subclass: Vetigastropoda
- Order: Lepetellida
- Superfamily: Scissurelloidea
- Family: Scissurellidae
- Genus: Scissurella
- Species: S. ornata

Binomial name
- Scissurella ornata May, 1908

Species of gastropod

Scissurella ornata, common name the ornate slit shell, is a species of small sea snail, a marine gastropod mollusk or micromollusk in the family Scissurellidae, the little slit snails.

== Description ==
The size of the shell varies between 1 mm and 2 mm.

== Distribution ==
This marine species occurs off New South Wales, Victoria, and Tasmania, Australia; living amongst seaweed.
