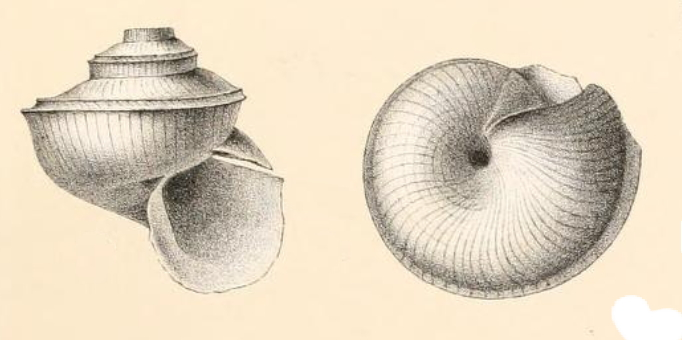
- Shell of Anatoma aedonia (holotype)

Scientific classification
- Kingdom: Animalia
- Phylum: Mollusca
- Class: Gastropoda
- Subclass: Vetigastropoda
- Order: Lepetellida
- Superfamily: Scissurelloidea
- Family: Anatomidae
- Genus: Anatoma
- Species: A. aedonia

Binomial name
- Anatoma aedonia (Watson, 1886)

Synonyms
- Scissurella aedonia Watson, 1886

= Anatoma aedonia =

Species of sea snail

Anatoma aedonia is a species of minute sea snail, a marine gastropod mollusk or micromollusk in the family Anatomidae.

== Description ==
(described as Scissurella aedonia) The length of the white shell reaches 2.5 mm. The shell has a depressedly globose shape. It is strongly sculptured, with a rather high scalar spire, exserted whorls, a very sharp and expressed carina, a minute tabulated apex, a strong and impressed suture, a tumid base, and a large pervious but half covered umbilicus. The radiating ribs are pretty strong, sharp, and equal above and below the canal. The whole surface is closely sharply, and regularly scored with fine threads, which are a little stronger (but not quite so sharp) on the base than above. The spire is high, scalar, each whorl rising and expanding above the suture. The apex is very small and tabulated. The five whorls slope down flatly (barely convex) from the suture. They are very sharply carinated at the canal, the under edge of which in particular is prominent and expressed. Below the canal they contract into the suture. The base of the shell is tumid. The suture is strongly impressed and very distinct. The aperture is quite round. The outer lip is thin, and regularly arched. The inner lip on the body is thin, and very short, It is regularly curved throughout, on the columellar lip.

== Distribution ==
This species occurs in the Atlantic Ocean off North Carolina, USA to Puerto Rico; off Brazil; off the Azores; off Tristan de Cunha at depths between 166 m and 640 m.
