= S. elegantissima =

S. elegantissima may refer to:

- Sasakiconcha elegantissima, a sea snail species
- Schefflera elegantissima, the false aralia, a plant species native to New Caledonia
- Seguenzia elegantissima, a sea snail species
