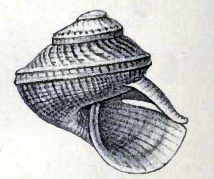
- Drawing with an apertural view of a shell of Scissurella mantelli

Scientific classification
- Kingdom: Animalia
- Phylum: Mollusca
- Class: Gastropoda
- Subclass: Vetigastropoda
- Order: Lepetellida
- Superfamily: Scissurelloidea
- Family: Scissurellidae
- Genus: Scissurella
- Species: S. mantelli

Binomial name
- Scissurella mantelli Woodward, 1859

Synonyms
- Anatoma mantelli (Woodward, 1859)

= Scissurella mantelli =

Species of gastropod

Scissurella mantelli is a species of small sea snail, a marine gastropod mollusc in the family Scissurellidae.

== Description ==
This species is considered a nomen dubium.

Woodward gave the following original description: Scissurella mantelli resembles Scissurella elegans d'Orbigny, 1824, but it is rather larger, more depressed, more strongly ornamented, and has a longer scissural band. The specimen has been in my hands several years, but I did not think it worth publishing until I observed that it exhibited a character hitherto omitted in all descriptions of the genus, viz., that the shell when young has no slit. M. d'Orbigny's figures of Scissurella elegans, elaborate and highly magnified, represent the scissural band winding round all the whorls and extending to the extreme apex. But on referring to the specimens collected by Mr. Jeffreys at Spezzia, I found that the band really terminated within half a whorl of the aperture, a smaller proportional distance than in S. mantelli, and that during the first part of its life the S. elegans also had a simple, entire lip, like the ordinary Trochidae.

== Distribution ==
This marine species occurs off North Island, New Zealand.
