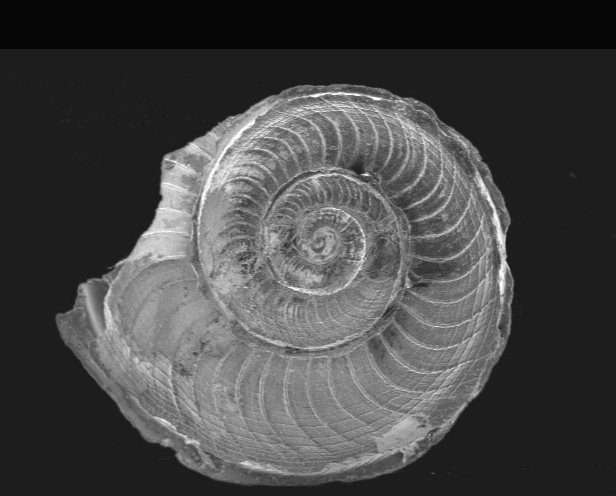
- Shell of Anatoma amoena (specimen at the Smithsonian Institution)

Scientific classification
- Kingdom: Animalia
- Phylum: Mollusca
- Class: Gastropoda
- Subclass: Vetigastropoda
- Order: Lepetellida
- Family: Anatomidae
- Genus: Anatoma
- Species: A. amoena

Binomial name
- Anatoma amoena (Thiele, 1912)

Synonyms
- Schizotrochus amoenus (Thiele, 1912) superseded combination; Scissurella amoena Thiele, 1912 (basionym); Thieleella amoena (Thiele, 1912)

= Anatoma amoena =

Species of gastropod

Anatoma amoena is a species of sea snail, a marine gastropod mollusk in the family Anatomidae.

== Description ==
The shell grows to a length of 3.5 mm.

(Original description in German) The shell's form closely resembles Anatoma alta (R. B. Watson, 1886), though it's notably larger, measuring about 3.5 mm in both height and diameter. Of its 4.5 whorls, the first two are flat. The subsequent whorls descend distinctly and are clearly convex at the top, with the broad slit band lying above the suture. The body whorl is also convex below, placing the slit band fairly in the middle. Both the upper and under sides are sculpted with rather strong, curved radial ribs and weaker spiral ridges. The umbilicusis moderately wide, partly covered by the columellar margin, and the apertureis fairly round.

== Distribution ==
This species occurs in the Weddell Sea, Antarctica.
