= Anatoma africanae =

Scientific classification
- Kingdom: Animalia
- Phylum: Mollusca
- Class: Gastropoda
- Subclass: Vetigastropoda
- Order: Lepetellida
- Superfamily: Scissurelloidea
- Family: Anatomidae
- Genus: Anatoma
- Species: A. africanae

Binomial name
- Anatoma africanae (Barnard, 1963)

Synonyms
- Scissurella africanae Barnard, 1963

Species of gastropod

Anatoma africanae is a species of small sea snail, a marine gastropod mollusk or micromollusk in the family Anatomidae.

== Distribution ==
This species occurs in the Indian Ocean off Madagascar.
