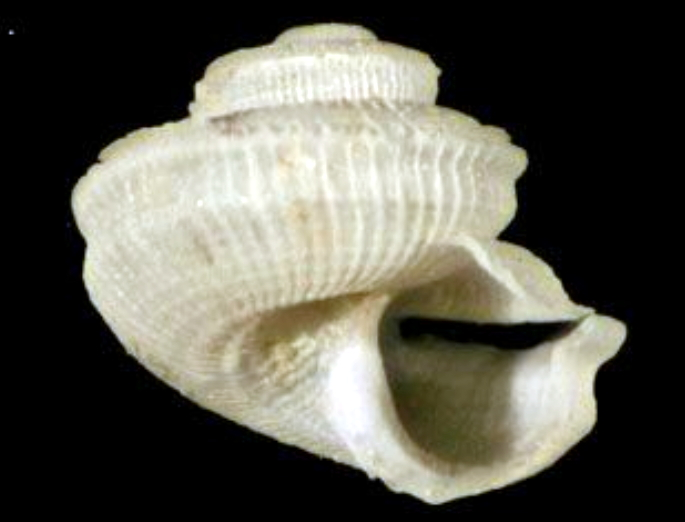
- Shell of Anatoma equatoria (specimen at the Natural History Museum Rotterdam)

Scientific classification
- Kingdom: Animalia
- Phylum: Mollusca
- Class: Gastropoda
- Subclass: Vetigastropoda
- Order: Lepetellida
- Superfamily: Scissurelloidea
- Family: Anatomidae
- Genus: Anatoma
- Species: A. equatoria

Binomial name
- Anatoma equatoria (Hedley, 1899)

Synonyms
- Anatoma aequatorina Hedley, 1899; Anatoma lamellata nanshaensis Feng, 1996; Scissurella equatoria Hedley, 1899

= Anatoma equatoria =

Species of gastropod

Anatoma equatoria is classified as a species of small sea snail, belonging to the family Anatomidae. It represents a marine gastropod mollusk, often categorized as a micromollusk due to its size.

== Description ==
The length of the shell attains 2.68 mm, its diameter 3mm.

(Original description) The shell is notably large for the genus, thin, and trochiform, featuring a gradate spire. It displays frilled, projecting keels and a compressed belt below the fasciole, which leads to a tumid base. The shell is entirely white.

It comprises five whorls. The sculpture consists of approximately eighty-five curved, oblique, and lamellate ribs that traverse the entire shell. Above, the spiral sculpture is barely traceable, but on the base, it becomes distinguishable as delicate, widely spaced threads that override the ribs and create a latticework in the interspaces. The fasciole is enfolded by broad margins, which are fimbriated by the ribs. The umbilicus is narrow, infundibuliform, and deep. The aperture is oblique and subquadrate. The outer lip is slightly and gently recurved, while the columellar margin is explanate and extends over the umbilicus.

== Distribution ==
This species occurs in the Java Sea, Indonesia; also in the Indo-Malayan Archipelago to mid-western Pacific; also off Australia and northern New Zealand and on the Kermadec Ridge.
