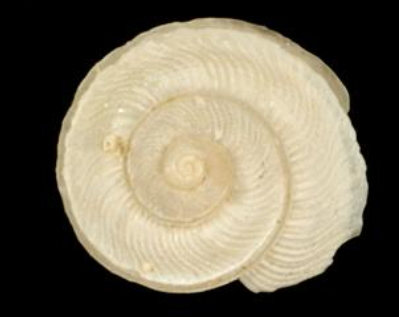
- Shell of Anatoma australis (specimen in the Australian Museum)

Scientific classification
- Kingdom: Animalia
- Phylum: Mollusca
- Class: Gastropoda
- Subclass: Vetigastropoda
- Order: Lepetellida
- Superfamily: Scissurelloidea
- Family: Anatomidae
- Genus: Anatoma
- Species: A. australis

Binomial name
- Anatoma australis (Hedley, 1903)

Synonyms
- Schizotrochus australis auct.; Scissurella australis Hedley, 1903

= Anatoma australis =

Species of gastropod

Anatoma australis, commonly known as the southern slit shell, is a species of small sea snail, a marine gastropod mollusc or micromollusc in the family Anatomidae.

== Description ==
The length of the shell reaches 3 mm.

== Distribution ==
This marine species occurs off New South Wales, Australia and off Tasmania.
