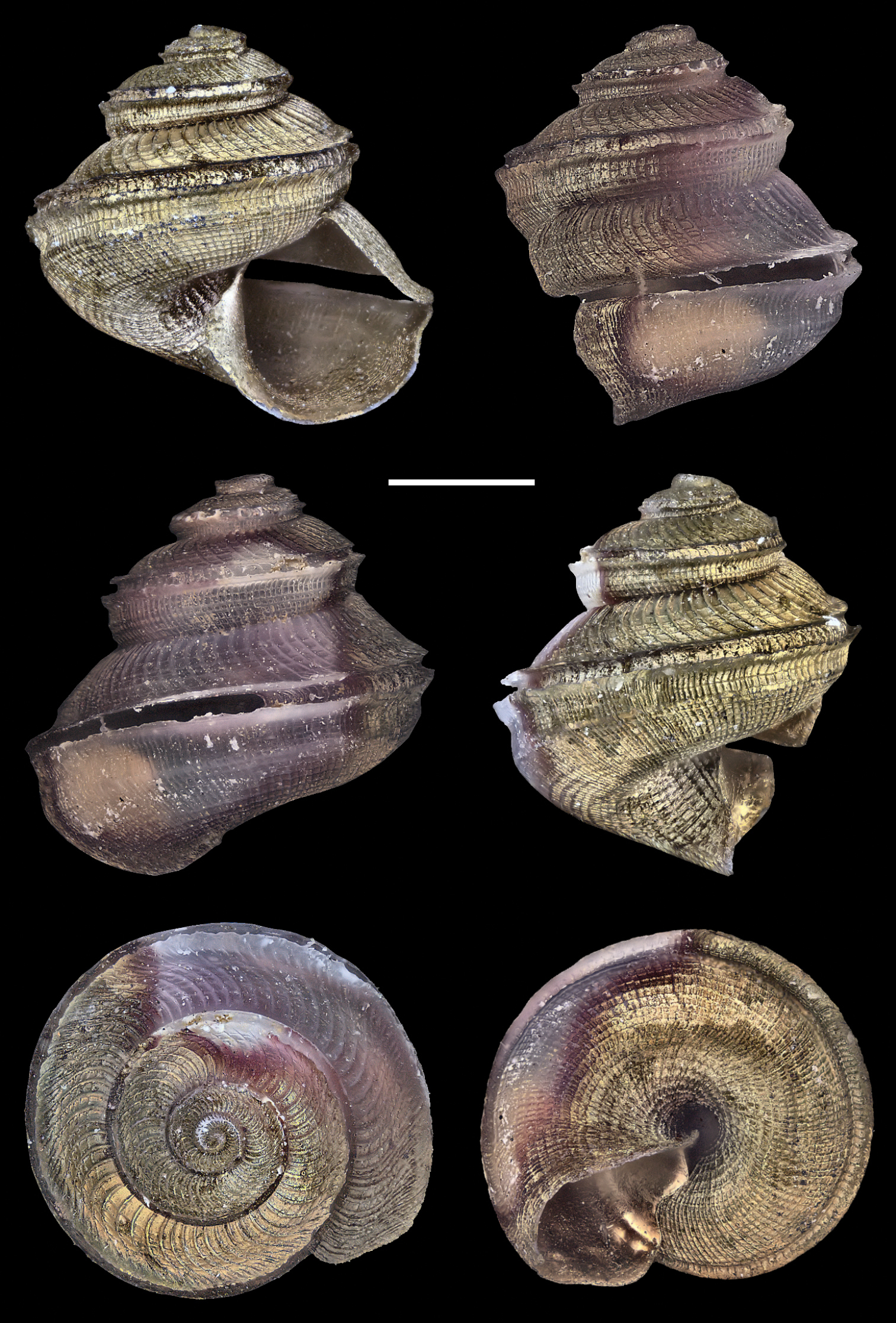
- Shell of Anatoma agulhasensis

Scientific classification
- Kingdom: Animalia
- Phylum: Mollusca
- Class: Gastropoda
- Subclass: Vetigastropoda
- Order: Lepetellida
- Superfamily: Scissurelloidea
- Family: Anatomidae
- Genus: Anatoma
- Species: A. agulhasensis

Binomial name
- Anatoma agulhasensis (Thiele, 1925)

Synonyms
- Scissurella agulhasensis Thiele, 1925

= Anatoma agulhasensis =

Species of gastropod

Anatoma agulhasensis is a species of small sea snail, a marine gastropod mollusk or micromollusk in the family Anatomidae.

== Description ==
The length of the shell reaches 3 mm, its diameter 2.5 mm.

(Original description in German) The shell is rather elevated and tightly coiled, with a rounded body whorl. The margins of the slit band, which lies slightly above the middle of the whorl, are only weakly raised, although they become more distinct toward the end. The slit itself extends for nearly one-third of the circumference of the whorl.

The upper surface shows strong, oblique, rather closely spaced and curved radial threads. These cross much weaker spiral threads, so that the latter are visible only in the intervening spaces. The underside is sculptured with a fine network of closely spaced radial and spiral threads of approximately equal strength, which continues inward to the moderately wide umbilicus.

The left side of the apertural margin is somewhat expanded, and the aperture is fairly rounded.

In modern terminology, the “slit band” may also be termed the selenizone, the spiral band produced by the successive positions of the slit in the outer lip.

== Distribution ==
This marine species occurs in the Agulhas Current, South Africa from the Cape Province to Zululand; off Australia.
