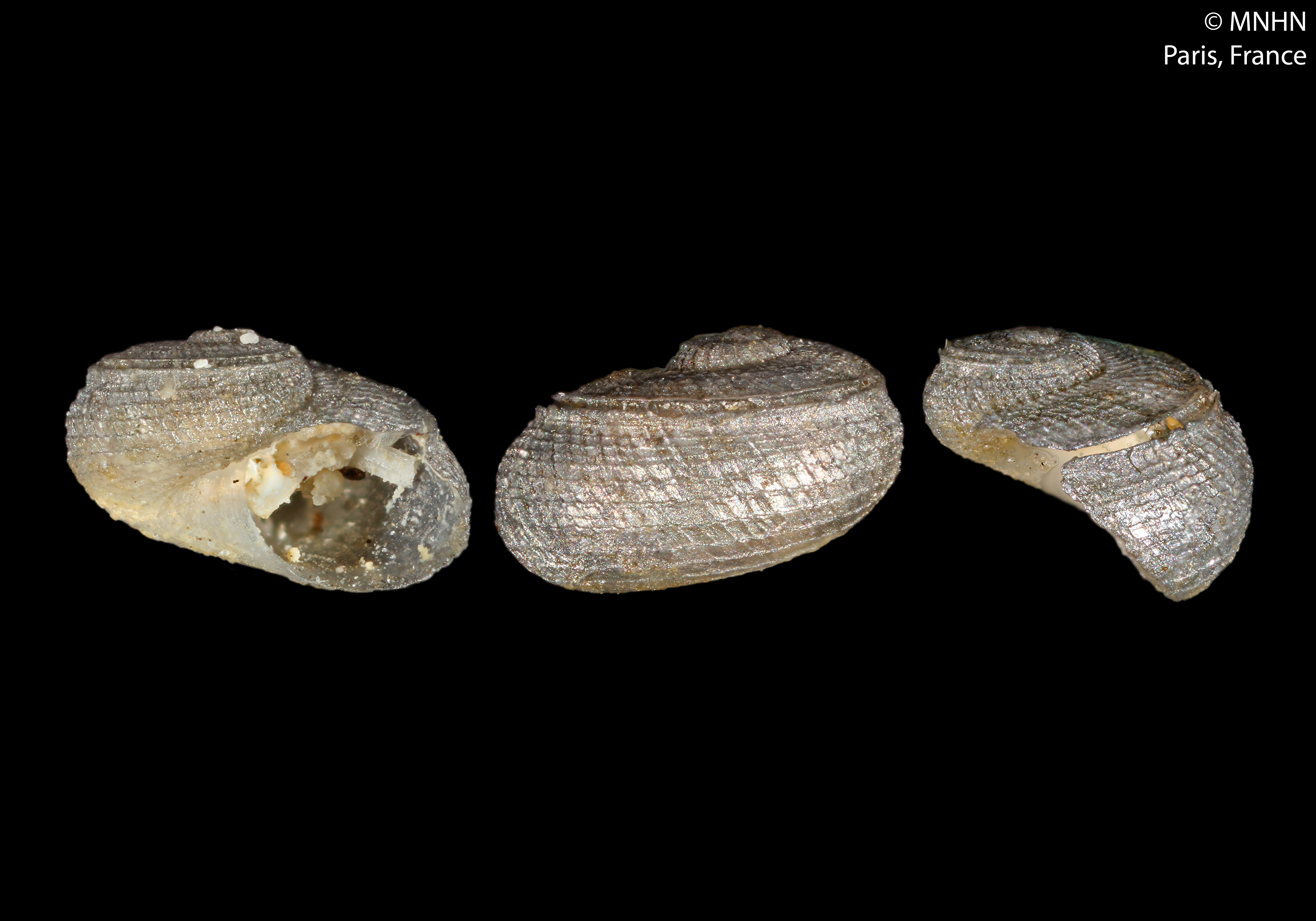
- shell of Scissurella reticulata (lectotype at MNHN? Paris)

Scientific classification
- Kingdom: Animalia
- Phylum: Mollusca
- Class: Gastropoda
- Subclass: Vetigastropoda
- Order: Lepetellida
- Superfamily: Scissurelloidea
- Family: Scissurellidae
- Genus: Scissurella
- Species: S. reticulata

Binomial name
- Scissurella reticulata Philippi, 1853

= Scissurella reticulata =

Species of gastropod

Scissurella reticulata is a species of small sea snail, a marine gastropod mollusk or micromollusk in the family Scissurellidae, the little slit snails.

== Description ==
The shell has a diameter of 2 mm. The white shell is thin, transparent, and glassy. It has an ovate shape, but it is rather depressed. The spire consists of 3½ convex whorls that increase pretty rapidly The striae of growth are cut into a reticulation by impressed transverse lines. The umbilicus is moderate, showing none of the whorls. The aperture is obliquely ovate.

== Distribution ==
This species occurs in the Red Sea.
