= Anatoma keenae =

Scientific classification
- Kingdom: Animalia
- Phylum: Mollusca
- Class: Gastropoda
- Subclass: Vetigastropoda
- Order: Lepetellida
- Superfamily: Scissurelloidea
- Family: Anatomidae
- Genus: Anatoma
- Species: A. keenae

Binomial name
- Anatoma keenae (McLean, 1970)

Synonyms
- Anatoma epicharis (McLean, 1970); Scissurella (Anatoma) epicharis J. H. McLean, 1970 junior subjective synonym; Scissurella (Anatoma) keenae J. H. McLean, 1970 alternative representation; Scissurella epicharis McLean, 1970 junior subjective synonym; Scissurella keenae McLean, 1970 superseded combination

Species of gastropod

Anatoma keenae is a species of minute sea snail, a marine gastropod mollusk or micromollusk in the family Anatomidae.

== Description ==
The diameter of the shell is around 1.9 mm, with the height being more varied at around 1.3-2.0mm. It have small, fragile shell.

== Distribution ==
This marine species occurs off the Gulf of California, Mexico; off the Galápagos Islands.
