= Anatoma sagamiana =

Scientific classification
- Kingdom: Animalia
- Phylum: Mollusca
- Class: Gastropoda
- Subclass: Vetigastropoda
- Order: Lepetellida
- Superfamily: Scissurelloidea
- Family: Anatomidae
- Genus: Anatoma
- Species: A. sagamiana

Binomial name
- Anatoma sagamiana (Okutani, 1964)

Synonyms
- Scissurella sagamiana Okutani, 1964; Thieleella reticulata Bandel, 1998; Thieleella sagamiana (Okutani, 1964)

Species of gastropod

Anatoma sagamiana is a species of small sea snail, a marine gastropod mollusk or micromollusk in the family Anatomidae.

== Distribution ==
This marine species occurs off Madagascar, The Philippines, Japan, New Caledonia and the Solomon Islands
