= Scissurella morretesi =

Scientific classification
- Kingdom: Animalia
- Phylum: Mollusca
- Class: Gastropoda
- Subclass: Vetigastropoda
- Order: Lepetellida
- Superfamily: Scissurelloidea
- Family: Scissurellidae
- Genus: Scissurella
- Species: S. morretesi

Binomial name
- Scissurella morretesi Montouchet, 1972

Species of gastropod

Scissurella morretesi is a species of minute sea snail, a marine gastropod mollusk or micromollusk in the family Scissurellidae, the little slit snails.

== Description ==
The shell grows to a height of 0.6 mm.

== Distribution ==
This species occurs in the Atlantic Ocean off East Brazil.
