= Scissurella obliqua =

Scientific classification
- Kingdom: Animalia
- Phylum: Mollusca
- Class: Gastropoda
- Subclass: Vetigastropoda
- Order: Lepetellida
- Superfamily: Scissurelloidea
- Family: Scissurellidae
- Genus: Scissurella
- Species: S. obliqua

Binomial name
- Scissurella obliqua Watson, 1886

Species of gastropod

Scissurella obliqua is a species of small sea snail, a marine gastropod mollusk or micromollusk in the family Scissurellidae, the little slit snails.

== Description ==
The shell grows to a height of 1.1 mm. The small shell is depressedly and obliquely globose. It has a rough appearance and is unadorned in any way. It has a small, rounded, barely prominent apex, a large, round, very descending aperture and a small umbilicus. There is no sculpture, but there are some harsh and irregular lines of growth. The semi-transparent shell has a white color beneath a yellow epidermis. The spire is slightly raised, and more or less subscalar. The apex is very small, and the extreme tip is tabulated. The 3½ to 4 whorls show a very rapid increase. They are well rounded, but a little flatter and more sloping above than below. They are scored by the old canal, which lies about halfway between the periphery and the suture, presenting no ridge, but scored across as usual with concave lines. The epidermis is yellow, membranaceous, and rather thick. The suture is slightly openly impressed. The round aperture is very oblique. The outer lip is thin and sharp. It is shortly but rather widely cleft. It is little inflected above, excessively patulous on the base. The inner lip is thickened, extremely short, and slightly disunited from the body. It is very concave on the columella, where it is bent back so as to cover the umbilical perforation, which presents a narrowed and not pervious but very strong depression. The large, yellow operculum is corneous and thin. It has a central nucleus and many spiral whorls, which seem to become more numerous toward the margin.

== Distribution ==
This marine species occurs off Victoria, Australia, the Kerguelen Islands and the Southern Indian Ocean.
