= Scissurella supraplicata =

Scientific classification
- Kingdom: Animalia
- Phylum: Mollusca
- Class: Gastropoda
- Subclass: Vetigastropoda
- Order: Lepetellida
- Superfamily: Scissurelloidea
- Family: Scissurellidae
- Genus: Scissurella
- Species: S. supraplicata

Binomial name
- Scissurella supraplicata E. A. Smith, 1875

Synonyms
- Anatoma supraplicata (E. A. Smith, 1875)

Species of gastropod

Scissurella supraplicata is a species of small sea snail, a marine gastropod mollusk or micromollusk in the family Scissurellidae, the little slit snails.

== Description ==
The height of the shell reaches 1 mm. The shell has a heliciform shape. The thin spire is short, narrowly perforate, and semi-pellucid. It has a white color with a caducous rather thick pale olive epidermis. The spire consists of three whorls, the first ? (abrupt), the second a little convex, somewhat planulate above and radiately arcuately plicate. The body whorl is large, having a thin double carina (slit fasciole) a little above the middle, radiately arcuately plicate above the carina, below it with stride of growth. The large aperture is irregularly circular, and very slightly expanded at the basal margi. The peristome is continuous. The deep, narrow slit is situated between the two thread-like keels. (

== Distribution ==
This species occurs in the Southern Indian Ocean off Kerguelen Islands.
