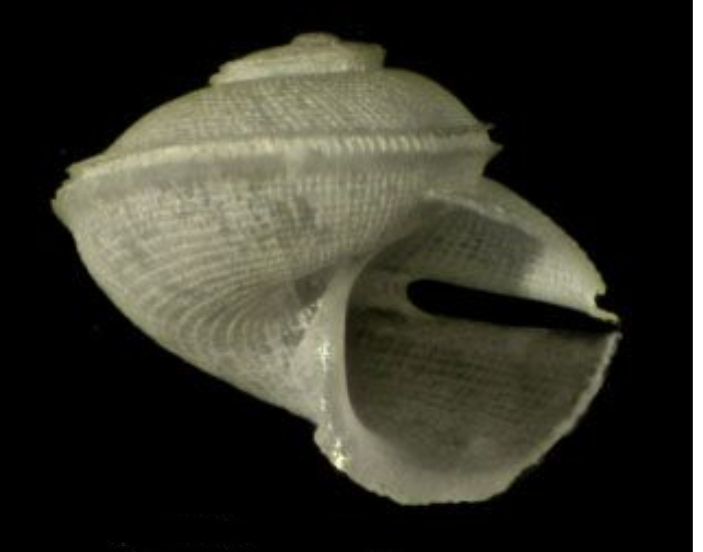
- Shell of Anatoma maxima (specimen at the Natural History Museum Rotterdam)

Scientific classification
- Kingdom: Animalia
- Phylum: Mollusca
- Class: Gastropoda
- Subclass: Vetigastropoda
- Order: Lepetellida
- Superfamily: Scissurelloidea
- Family: Anatomidae
- Genus: Anatoma
- Species: A. maxima

Binomial name
- Anatoma maxima (Schepman, 1908)

Synonyms
- Scissurella maxima Schepman, 1908

= Anatoma maxima =

Species of gastropod

Anatoma maxima is a species of small sea snail, a marine gastropod mollusk or micromollusk in the family Anatomidae.

The generic position is uncertain: Anatoma or Thieleella (protoconch sculpture unknown)

== Description ==
The size of the shell varies between 2 mm and 3 mm.

(Original description) The shell is large, thin, and depressed, exhibiting a yellowish-white coloration. It comprises approximately 4¼ whorls, which are convex above and become concave toward the slit, increasing in size rapidly. The protoconch is smooth. The sculpture consists of numerous fine, curved, radiating ribs, which are interrupted on the lower whorls by the slit-fasciole. These ribs are crossed by about ten spiral lirae on the upper surface, along with a few secondary lirae. Where the ribs and lirae intersect, they form small, square beads. The sculpture on the base is similar, though the ribs become more crowded near the aperture.

The slit is long, peripheral, rather wide, and deep, with upturned edges striated by arched, lamellose striae. The umbilicus is partially covered by the columellar margin. The aperture is rounded, very oblique, and angular at the insertion on both the body whorl and the periphery. The outer and basal margins are rounded and thin. The columellar margin is slightly concave, reflected a little at the upper part, and more strongly so below where it meets the basal margin. On the body whorl, the margins are connected by a thin layer of enamel.

== Distribution ==
This marine species occurs in the Ceram Sea off Indonesia and the Philippines.
