= Scissurella cyprina =

Scientific classification
- Kingdom: Animalia
- Phylum: Mollusca
- Class: Gastropoda
- Subclass: Vetigastropoda
- Order: Lepetellida
- Superfamily: Scissurelloidea
- Family: Scissurellidae
- Genus: Scissurella
- Species: S. cyprina

Binomial name
- Scissurella cyprina Cotton & Godfrey, 1938

Species of gastropod

Scissurella cyprina, common name the Venus slit shell, is a species of small sea snail, a marine gastropod mollusk or micromollusk in the family Scissurellidae, the little slit snails.

== Description ==
The shell grows to a height of 2 mm.

== Distribution ==
This marine species occurs off New South Wales, South Australia and Western Australia; off Tasmania.
