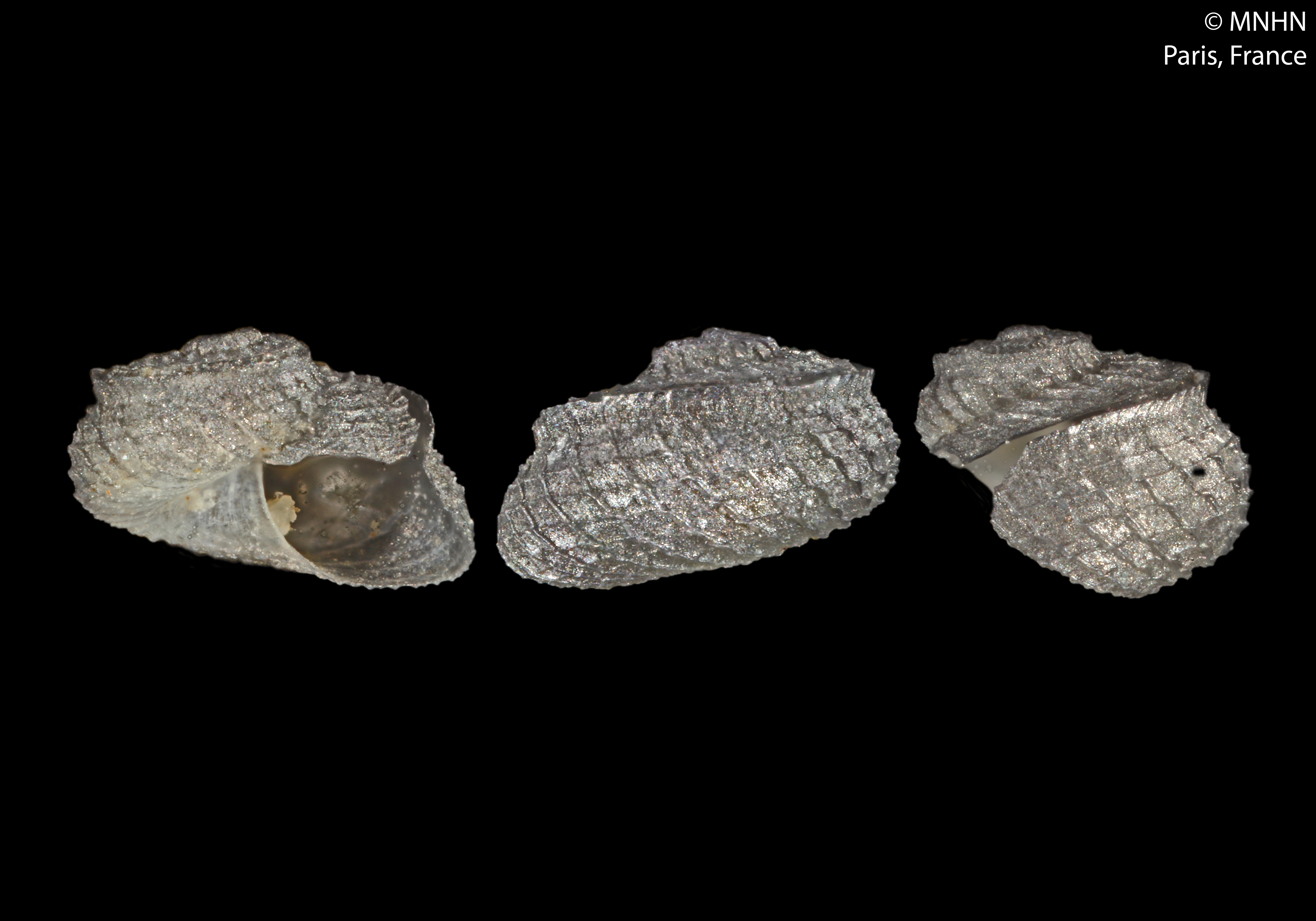
- Shell of Scissurella rota (holotype at MNHN, Paris)

Scientific classification
- Kingdom: Animalia
- Phylum: Mollusca
- Class: Gastropoda
- Subclass: Vetigastropoda
- Order: Lepetellida
- Superfamily: Scissurelloidea
- Family: Scissurellidae
- Genus: Scissurella
- Species: S. rota

Binomial name
- Scissurella rota Yaron, 1983

= Scissurella rota =

Species of gastropod

Scissurella rota is a species of small sea snail, a marine gastropod mollusk or micromollusk in the family Scissurellidae, the little slit snails.

== Description ==
The size of the shell is small and varies between 1.3 mm and 1.9 mm. It is typically fragile, thin and globose with a small spire and whorls. The umbilicus is relatively broad and shallow, with the aperture appearing ovate-oblong with a sharp outer lip. It is white in color and some species in this family exhibit a slightly pearly or glossy sheen.

== Distribution ==
This marine species occurs in the Red Sea and off the East Cape Province, South Africa.

== Diet ==
Members of this species feed primarily on algae or detritus.

== Habitat ==
Typically found in the benthic zone of a body of water.
