= Sasakiconcha elegantissima =

Scientific classification
- Kingdom: Animalia
- Phylum: Mollusca
- Class: Gastropoda
- Subclass: Vetigastropoda
- Order: Lepetellida
- Superfamily: Scissurelloidea
- Family: Anatomidae
- Genus: Sasakiconcha
- Species: S. elegantissima

Binomial name
- Sasakiconcha elegantissima Geiger, 2006

Species of gastropod

Sasakiconcha elegantissima is a species of sea snail, a marine gastropod mollusk in the family Anatomidae.

== Distribution ==
This species occurs in the Pacific Ocean off the Austral Islands, French Polynesia
