= Scissurella clathrata =

Scientific classification
- Kingdom: Animalia
- Phylum: Mollusca
- Class: Gastropoda
- Subclass: Vetigastropoda
- Order: Lepetellida
- Superfamily: Scissurelloidea
- Family: Scissurellidae
- Genus: Scissurella
- Species: S. clathrata

Binomial name
- Scissurella clathrata Strebel, 1908

Synonyms
- Anatoma clathrata (Strebel, 1908); Schizotrochus clathrata (Strebel, 1908); Scissurella eucharista Melvill & Standen, 1912; Scissurella malvinarum Zelaya & Geiger, 2007

Species of gastropod

Scissurella clathrata is a species of small sea snail, a marine gastropod mollusk or micromollusk in the family Scissurellidae, the little slit snails.

== Description ==
The shell grows to a height of 1.7 mm.

== Distribution ==
This marine species occurs off Argentina, the Falkland Islands, Tierra del Fuego, Chile.
