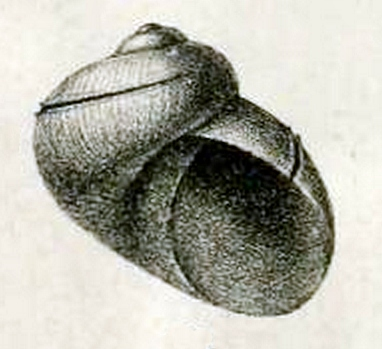
- Original drawing of a shell of Scissurella jucunda

Scientific classification
- Kingdom: Animalia
- Phylum: Mollusca
- Class: Gastropoda
- Subclass: Vetigastropoda
- Order: Lepetellida
- Superfamily: Scissurelloidea
- Family: Scissurellidae
- Genus: Scissurella
- Species: S. jucunda

Binomial name
- Scissurella jucunda E. A. Smith, 1890

Synonyms
- Scissurella smithi Thiele, 1912

= Scissurella jucunda =

Species of gastropod

Scissurella jucunda is a species of small sea snail, a marine gastropod mollusk or micromollusk in the family Scissurellidae, the little slit snails.

== Description ==
The shell grows to a height of 1.2 mm.

== Distribution ==
This species occurs in the Atlantic Ocean off St Helena and Ascension Island.
