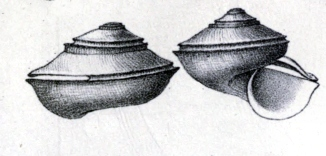
- Two views of a shell of Anatoma umbilicata

Scientific classification
- Kingdom: Animalia
- Phylum: Mollusca
- Class: Gastropoda
- Subclass: Vetigastropoda
- Order: Lepetellida
- Family: Anatomidae
- Genus: Anatoma
- Species: A. umbilicata

Binomial name
- Anatoma umbilicata (Jeffreys, 1883)

Synonyms
- Scissurella umbilicata Jeffreys, 1883 (original combination)

= Anatoma umbilicata =

Species of gastropod

Anatoma umbilicata is a species of sea snail, a marine gastropod mollusk in the family Anatomidae.

== Description ==
The white, minute shell forms a depressed sphere which is equally raised above and below. It is rather thin, semitransparent and somewhat glossy. It has no sculpture except a very fine and close set, but indistinct, lines of growth. The spire is slightly raised. The 4-5 whorls are flattened above and sloping outwards. They rapidly enlarge, so that the body whorl considerably exceeds in size the rest of the shell. The slit is long and central, equal in width, with upturned edges. The aperture is nearly circular, but somewhat angulated where it is united to the body whorl below the peripheral keel. The peristome is continuous, although not free in consequence of the inner lip being attached to the shell. The outer lip is thin and sharp. The inner lip spreads on the lower part of the body whorl. The umbilicus is rather large, funnel-shaped, and deep. The operculum is not observed, the specimens now described being dead.

== Distribution ==
This species occurs in European waters, the Caribbean Sea and the Lesser Antilles.
