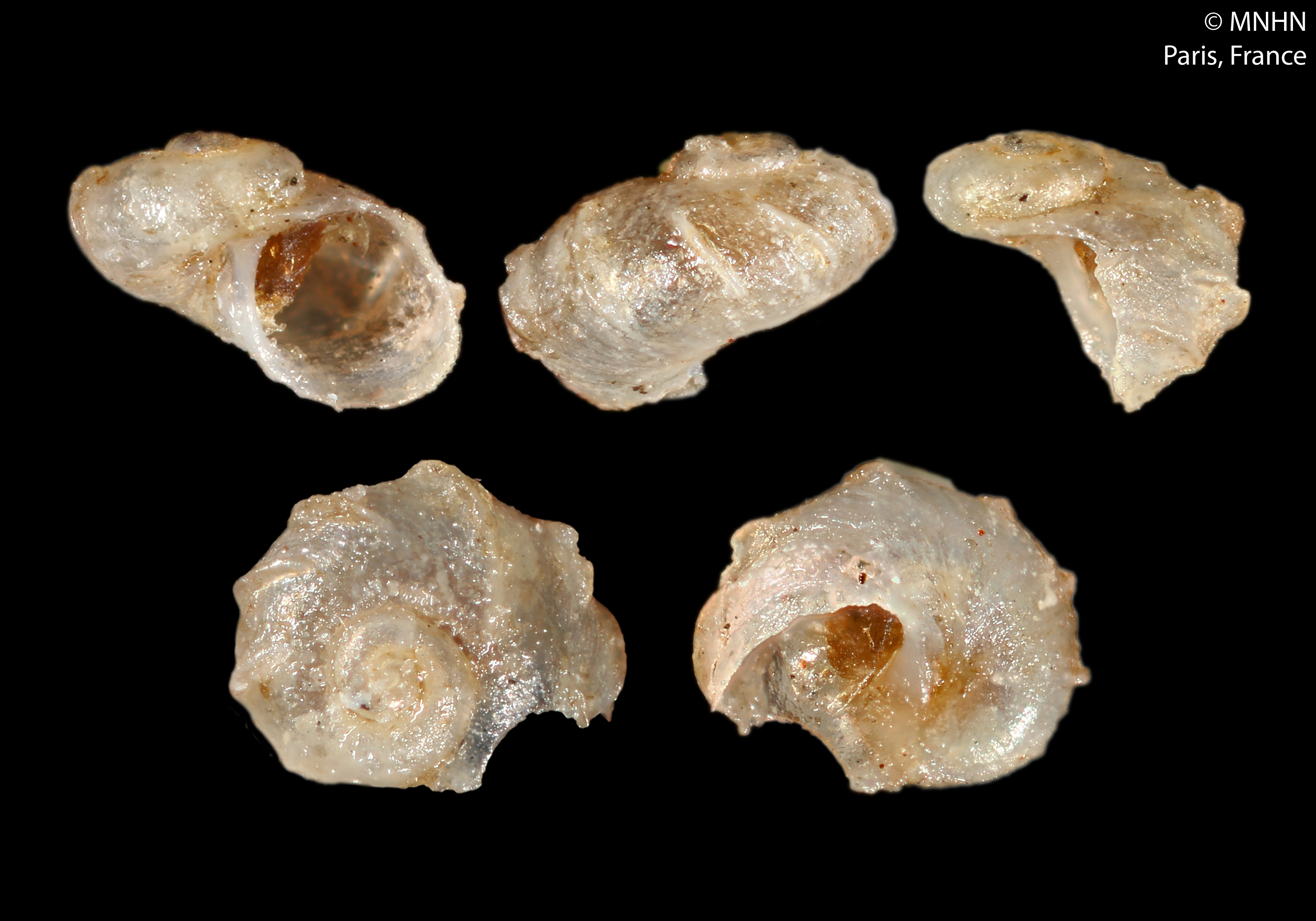
- Shell of Scissurella petermannensis (holotype at MNHN, Paris)

Scientific classification
- Kingdom: Animalia
- Phylum: Mollusca
- Class: Gastropoda
- Subclass: Vetigastropoda
- Order: Lepetellida
- Family: Scissurellidae
- Genus: Scissurella
- Species: S. petermannensis

Binomial name
- Scissurella petermannensis Lamy, 1910

Synonyms
- Schizotrochus petermannensis (Lamy, 1910); Scissurella medioplicata Thiele, 1925; Scissurella timora Melvill & Standen, 1912

= Scissurella petermannensis =

Species of gastropod

Scissurella petermannensis is a species of small sea snail, a marine gastropod mollusk in the family Scissurellidae.

== Description ==
The size of the shell varies between 1.2 mm and 1.8 mm. It has been described as having prominent lamellar ribs and being similar in shape to Scissurella coronata.

== Distribution ==
This species occurs in Antarctic waters, off the Falkland Islands, Tierra del Fuego, South Georgia, South Shetland Islands and the South Orkneys at depths to 31 m.
