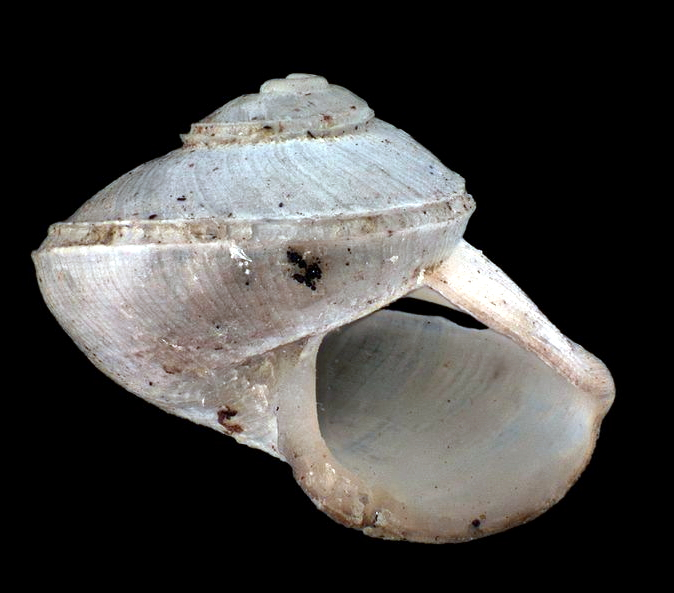
- Shell of Anatoma regia (specimen at the Museum of New Zealand)

Scientific classification
- Kingdom: Animalia
- Phylum: Mollusca
- Class: Gastropoda
- Subclass: Vetigastropoda
- Order: Lepetellida
- Family: Anatomidae
- Genus: Anatoma
- Species: A. regia

Binomial name
- Anatoma regia (Mestayer, 1916)

Synonyms
- Scissurella regia Mestayer, 1916

= Anatoma regia =

Species of gastropod

Anatoma regia is a species of small sea snail, a marine gastropod mollusc in the family Anatomidae.

== Description ==
The height of the shell attains 2.5 mm, its width 2 mm.

(Original description) This small, turbinate shell features three slightly angled whorls, with the upper surface lightly convex and the underside more so; the body whorl is notably large. The protoconch consists of two minute, smooth, dull whorls.

Sculpture: The shell exhibits two fine, sharp, raised spiral keels positioned closely together on the angle of the whorls. Fine flexuous riblets adorn both surfaces. On the underside, these riblets are crossed by fine spiral lirae, which become more distinct around the umbilicus.

The umbilicus is small and open, and the aperture is obscurely triangular. The anal slit, located between the keels on the outer lip, is long and more contracted at the edge of the lip than at its upper end. The operculum remains unknown. The shell's color is white.

== Distribution ==
This marine species is endemic to New Zealand and occurs off North Island, South Island, Lord Howe Rise, Chatham Islands, Campbell Plateau and Pukaki Rise.
