= Scissurella georgica =

Scientific classification
- Kingdom: Animalia
- Phylum: Mollusca
- Class: Gastropoda
- Subclass: Vetigastropoda
- Order: Lepetellida
- Family: Scissurellidae
- Genus: Scissurella
- Species: S. georgica

Binomial name
- Scissurella georgica Davolos & Moolenbeek, 2005

Species of gastropod

Scissurella georgica is a species of minute sea snail, a marine gastropod mollusk in the family Scissurellidae.

== Description ==
The shell grows to a height of 1 mm.

== Distribution ==
This species occurs in cold waters off South Georgia.
