= Scissurella cebuana =

Scientific classification
- Kingdom: Animalia
- Phylum: Mollusca
- Class: Gastropoda
- Subclass: Vetigastropoda
- Order: Lepetellida
- Family: Scissurellidae
- Genus: Scissurella
- Species: S. cebuana

Binomial name
- Scissurella cebuana ( Bandel, 1998)

Synonyms
- Anatoma cebuana Bandel, 1998

Species of gastropod

Scissurella cebuana is a species of sea snail, a marine gastropod mollusk in the family Scissurellidae.
