= Scissurella manawatawhia =

Scientific classification
- Kingdom: Animalia
- Phylum: Mollusca
- Class: Gastropoda
- Subclass: Vetigastropoda
- Order: Lepetellida
- Family: Scissurellidae
- Genus: Scissurella
- Species: S. manawatawhia

Binomial name
- Scissurella manawatawhia Powell, 1937

Species of gastropod

Scissurella manawatawhia is a species of minute sea snail, a marine gastropod mollusc in the family Scissurellidae.

== Description ==
The minute, thin, white shell grows to a height of 1 mm.

== Distribution ==
This marine species occurs off New Zealand.
