= Scissurella lorenzi =

Scientific classification
- Kingdom: Animalia
- Phylum: Mollusca
- Class: Gastropoda
- Subclass: Vetigastropoda
- Order: Lepetellida
- Family: Scissurellidae
- Genus: Scissurella
- Species: S. lorenzi

Binomial name
- Scissurella lorenzi Geiger, 2006

Species of gastropod

Scissurella lorenzi is a species of small sea snail, a marine gastropod mollusk in the family Scissurellidae.
