= John Fleming (naturalist) =

Scottish minister and scientist (1785 – 1857)

John Fleming FRSE FRS FSA
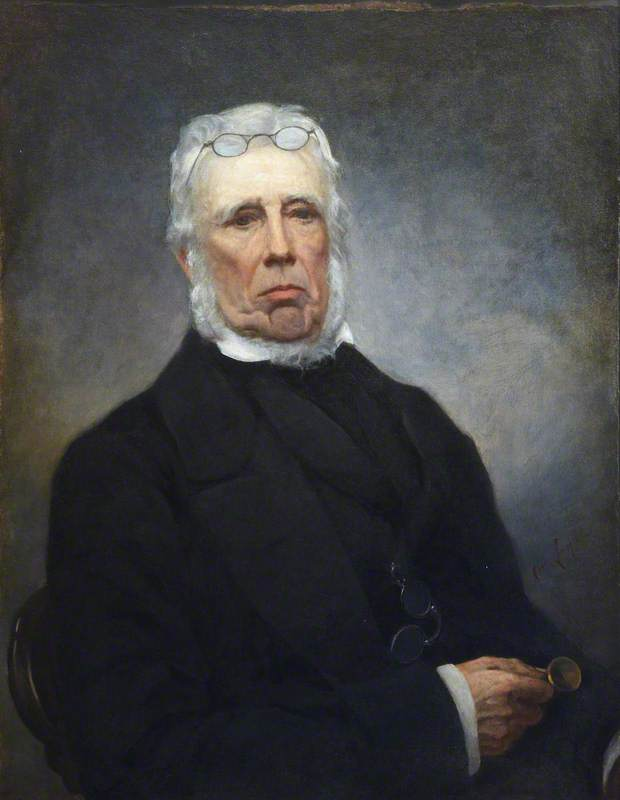
- Born: 10 January 1785; Bathgate, Linlithgowshire
- Died: 18 November 1857 (aged 72)

Academic background
- Education: University of Edinburgh

Academic work
- Discipline: theology natural history zoology geology
- Institutions: University of Aberdeen's King's College; New College

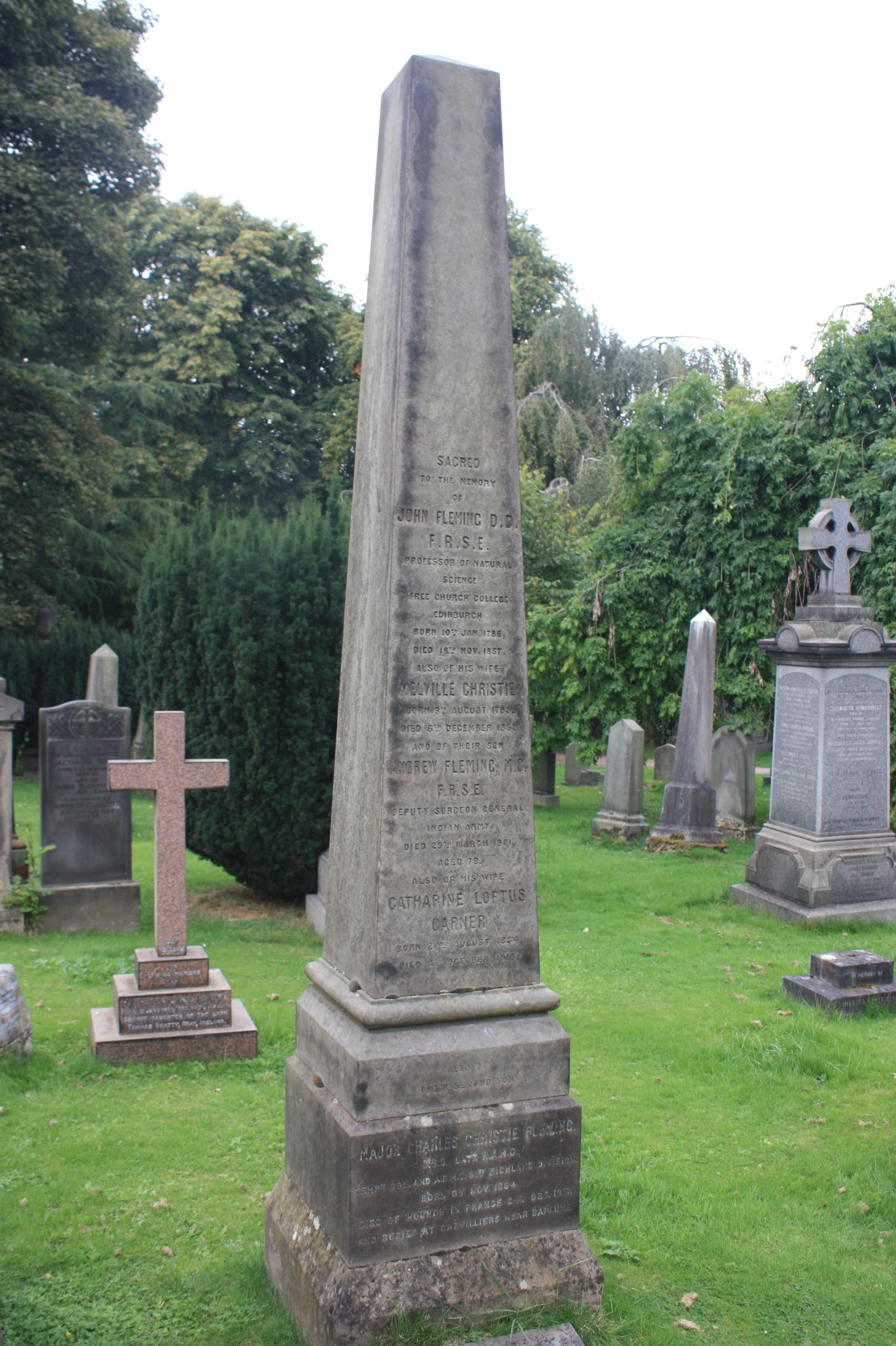
Prof John Fleming's grave, Dean Cemetery

John Fleming FRSE FRS FSA (10 January 1785 – 18 November 1857) was a naturalist, zoologist, geologist, and minister of the Free Church of Scotland. He named and described several species of mollusc. During his life he tried to reconcile theology with science.

The Fleming Fjord in Greenland was named after him.

== Life ==
Fleming was born on Kirkroads Farm, Bathgate in Linlithgowshire, the son of Alexander Fleming and his wife Catherine Nimmo. After studying divinity at the University of Edinburgh he graduated in 1805. He was licensed to preach by the Church of Scotland and ordained as minister of Bressay in the Shetland Islands in 1808. In 1810 he translated to the parish of Flisk in Fife and in 1832 translated to Clackmannan. In 1808, he became a member of the Wernerian Society, a society devoted to the study of natural history.

Fleming became a member of the Royal Society of London on 25 February 1813 (he was not granted fellowship). In 1814, he was awarded an honorary doctorate of divinity by the University of St Andrews, and in the same year he became a fellow of the Royal Society of Edinburgh. His proposers for the latter were John Playfair, David Brewster and Robert Jameson.

He was awarded the chair of natural philosophy (physics) at the University of Aberdeen's King's College in 1834. In the Disruption of 1843 he left the established Church of Scotland to join the Free Church. In 1845, he became professor of natural history at the Free Church's New College in Edinburgh. He was three times elected president of the Edinburgh Botanical Society (1847–48, 1849–50 and 1856–57). He was then living at 22 Walker Street in Edinburgh's West End.

He died at home, the Sea Grove House in Leith, and is buried with his family in the western half of Dean Cemetery in Edinburgh. He is buried with his wife Melville Christie (1796–1862) and son Andrew Fleming (1821–1901) who was also a fellow of the Royal Society of Edinburgh and rose to be Deputy Surgeon General of the Indian Army.

== Career ==
Fleming was a vitalist who was strongly opposed to materialism. He believed that a 'vital principle' was inherent in the embryo with the capacity of "developing in succession the destined plan of existence." Fleming also vehemently opposed the idea of transmutation of species. He was a close associate of Robert Edmond Grant, who considered that the same laws of life affected all organisms.

In 1821, he took part in a Northern Lighthouse cruise with Robert Stevenson. They visited Scalpay, Outer Hebrides. Murdo MacLellan of Scalpay gave them a live Great auk, recently caught by four fowlers on St Kilda. Fleming describes this event in his "A History of British Animals" giving the year as 1822, though John Alexander Smith confirm the correct year was 1821 in correspondence with Thomas Stevenson. The Great Auk was allowed to swim in the sea tethered by a line attached to a leg, and it escaped from the line near the Isle of Arran. This was the last Great Auk recorded in Britain, although a controversial account of a bird killed as a witch on St Kilda in the 1840s is also claimed as the last record.

In 1824, Fleming became involved in a famous controversy with the geologist William Buckland about the nature of the flood as described in the Bible. In 1828, he published his History of British Animals. This book addressed both extant and fossil species. It explained the presence of fossils by climate change, suggesting that extinct species would have survived if weather conditions had been favorable. These theories contributed to the advancement of biogeography, and exerted some influence on Charles Darwin. Fleming's comments on instinct in his book Philosophy of Zoology had also influenced Darwin.

In 1831, Fleming found some fossils which he recognized as fish in the Old Red Sandstone units at Fife. This did not fit the generally accepted notion that the Earth was approximately 6,000 years old.

== Works ==
- 1821: Insecta in Supplement to the fourth, fifth and sixth editions of the Encyclopaedia Britannica, with preliminary dissertations on the history of the sciences
- 1822: Philosophy of Zoology (Volume 1, Volume 2)
- 1828: A History of British animals, exhibiting the descriptive characters and systematical arrangement of the genera and species of quadrupeds, birds, reptiles, fishes, mollusca, and radiata of the United Kingdom, including the indigenous, extirpated, and extinct kinds, together with periodical and occasional visitants
- 1837: Molluscous Animals
- 1851: The Temperature of the Seasons, and Its Influence on Inorganic Objects, and on Plants and Animals

== Described taxa ==
- Superfamily: Conoidea Fleming, 1822
- Family: Conidae Fleming, 1822
- Subfamily: Coninae Fleming, 1822

Species in the phylum Mollusca described by Fleming:

- Chiton laevigatus Fleming 1813
- Patella elongata Fleming 1813
- Patella elliptica Fleming 1813
- Doris nigricans Fleming 1820
- Heterofusus retroversus Fleming 1823
- Octopus octopodia (Linné 1758 : Sepia) Fleming, 1826
- Bulla cranchii Fleming 1828
- Eolidia plumosa Fleming 1828
- Modiola vulgaris Fleming 1828
- Lima fragilis Gmelin 1791 sensu Fleming, 1828
- Lutraria vulgaris Fleming 1828
- Gastrochaena hians Fleming 1828
- Patella clealandi Fleming 1828
- Assiminea grayana Fleming 1828
- Scissurella crispata Fleming 1828
