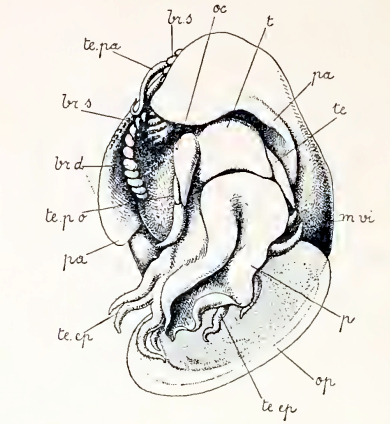
- Drawing of the ventral aspect of the animal without the shell, magnified: br.d, right gill; br.s, left gill; m.vi, visceral mass; oc, right eye; op, operculum; p;foot; pa, mantle; t, snout; tc, left cephalic tentacle; te.cp, epipodial tentacles; te.pa, pallial tentacle; te.p.o, post-ocular tentacle.

Scientific classification
- Kingdom: Animalia
- Phylum: Mollusca
- Class: Gastropoda
- Subclass: Vetigastropoda
- Order: Lepetellida
- Family: Anatomidae
- Genus: Anatoma
- Species: A. euglypta

Binomial name
- Anatoma euglypta (Pelseneer, 1903)

Synonyms
- Schizotrochus euglyptus (Pelseneer, 1903); Scissurella euglypta Pelseneer, 1903

= Anatoma euglypta =

Species of gastropod

Anatoma euglypta is a species of very small sea snail, a marine gastropod mollusk or micromollusk in the family Anatomidae.

== Description ==
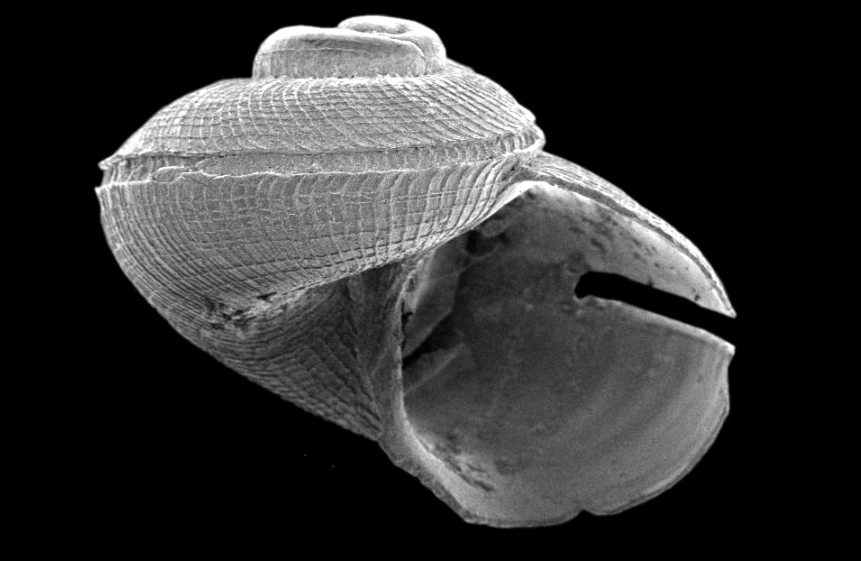
Shell of Anatoma euglypta

The shell grows to a length of 11 mm.

(Original description in French) The shell is thin and fragile, with a depressed spire and rapidly growing whorls. Its surface is uniformly reticulated, both below and above the "fissural band." This band is visible all the way to the apex, as it isn't covered by the suture of the early whorls.

Color of the shell: white, subtransparent.

The operculum is circular, multispiral, and transparent.

There are six epipodial tentacles on each side, including the postrhinophoric tentacle; all are similar.

== Distribution ==
This marine species occurs in Antarctic and Subantarctic waters.
