= Scissurella evaensis =

Scientific classification
- Kingdom: Animalia
- Phylum: Mollusca
- Class: Gastropoda
- Subclass: Vetigastropoda
- Order: Lepetellida
- Family: Scissurellidae
- Genus: Scissurella
- Species: S. evaensis

Binomial name
- Scissurella evaensis Bandel, 1998

Synonyms
- Maxwellella unispirata Bandel, 1998

Species of gastropod

Scissurella evaensis is a species of sea snail, a marine gastropod mollusk in the family Scissurellidae.
