= Scissurella lobini =

Scientific classification
- Kingdom: Animalia
- Phylum: Mollusca
- Class: Gastropoda
- Subclass: Vetigastropoda
- Order: Lepetellida
- Family: Scissurellidae
- Genus: Scissurella
- Species: S. lobini

Binomial name
- Scissurella lobini (Burnay & Rolán, 1990)

Synonyms
- Sinezona lobini Burnay & Rolán, 1990

Species of gastropod

Scissurella lobini is a species of minute sea snail, a marine gastropod mollusk or micromollusk in the family Scissurellidae, the little slit shells.

== Description ==
The shell grows to a height of 0.7 mm.

== Distribution ==
This species occurs in the Atlantic Ocean off Cape Verde.
