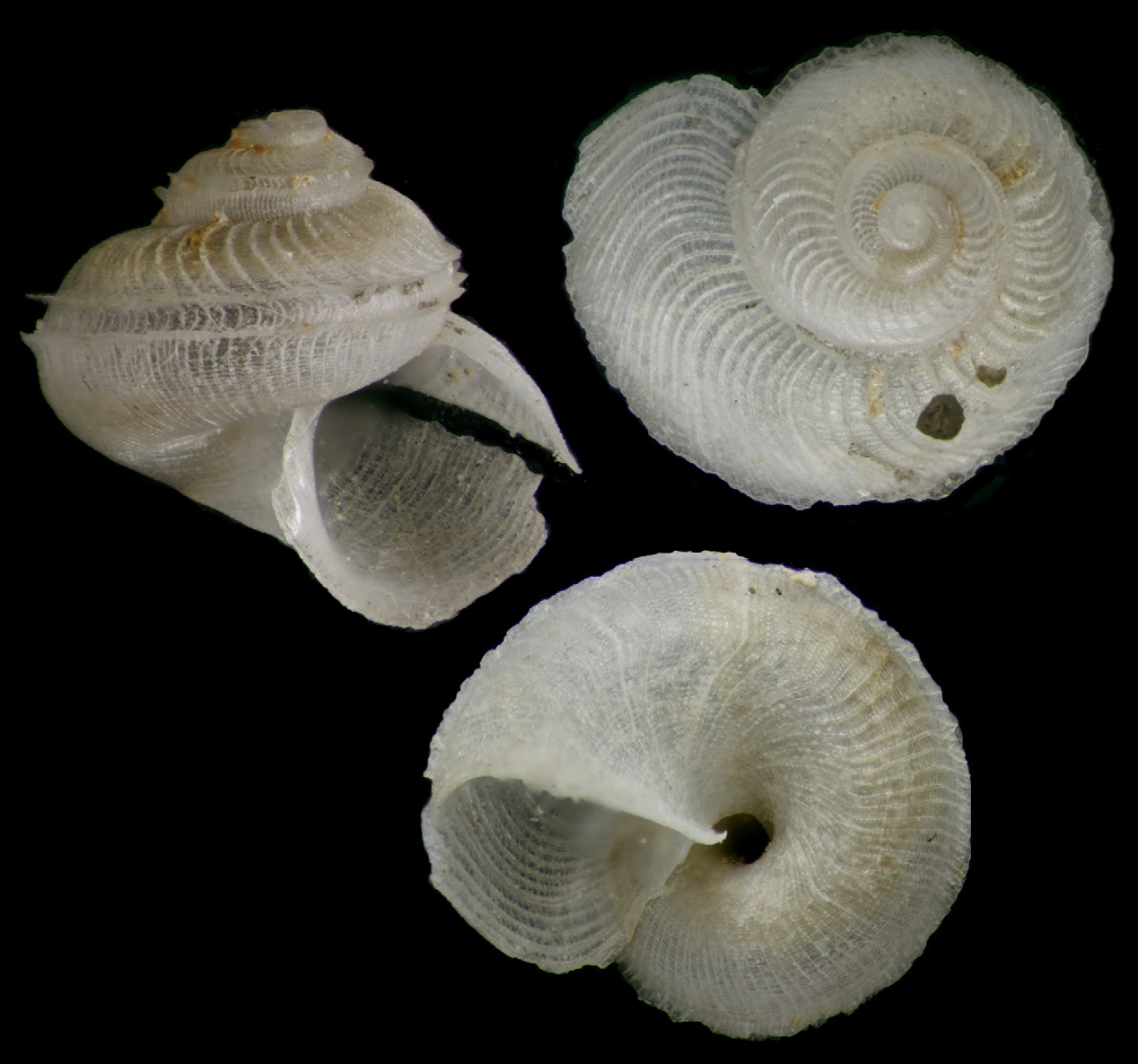

Scientific classification
- Kingdom: Animalia
- Phylum: Mollusca
- Class: Gastropoda
- Subclass: Vetigastropoda
- Order: Lepetellida
- Family: Anatomidae
- Genus: Anatoma
- Species: A. aspera

Binomial name
- Anatoma aspera (Philippi, 1844)

Synonyms
- † Anatoma costamagnaensis Bandel, 1998; Schizotrochus aspera (Philippi, 1844); Schizotrochus divaricatus Montrosato, 1890; † Scissurella affinis O. G. Costa, 1861; Scissurella aspera Philippi, 1844 (basionym); Scissurella crispata var. paucicostata Jeffreys, 1865

= Anatoma aspera =

Species of mollusc

Anatoma aspera is a species of small sea snail, a marine gastropod mollusc or micromollusc in the family Anatomidae.

== Description ==
The length of the shell of this species varies between 1 mm and 3 mm. The shell is usually grayish-white. Operculum is thin and transparent.

(Original description in Latin) The shell is orbiculate-conical, most elegantly crisped with elevated longitudinal lines, and transversely striated in the interstices. The spire is elevated, almost equaling the aperture.

The shell measures in diameter the same as in height. Its elevated, subglobular shape distinguishes it from all its congeners in Scissurella. There are five very convex whorls, even above the carina (keel), which occupies the middle on the upper whorls. On the body whorl, a distinct angle is present below the carina. The longitudinal striae are very sharp, distant on the upper whorls, and crowded at the base. The transverse lines are much more crowded and much finer. The carina is rough with growth striae. The aperture is almost orbicular, and the umbilicus is very narrow, being wider in younger specimens.

== Distribution ==
This species occurs in European waters, the Mediterranean Sea, the northern Atlantic Ocean, and in the West Indies.
