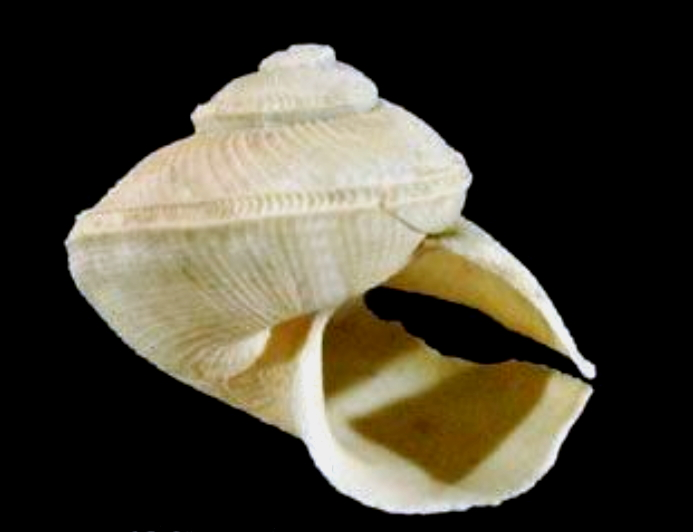
- Shell of Anatoma crispata (specimen at Natural History Museum Rotterdam)

Scientific classification
- Kingdom: Animalia
- Phylum: Mollusca
- Class: Gastropoda
- Subclass: Vetigastropoda
- Order: Lepetellida
- Superfamily: Scissurelloidea
- Family: Anatomidae
- Genus: Anatoma
- Species: A. crispata

Binomial name
- Anatoma crispata (Fleming, 1828)

Synonyms
- Anatoma schioettei Høisæter & D. L. Geiger, 2011 (junior synonym); Scissurella (Schizotrochus) crispata J. Fleming, 1828 superseded combination; Scissurella angulata Lovén, 1846; Scissurella crispata Fleming, 1828; Scissurella elatior G. B. Sowerby I, 1831; Scissurella palaeomphaloides Nordsieck, 1974

= Anatoma crispata =

Species of gastropod

Anatoma crispata is a species of small sea snail, a marine gastropod mollusk or micromollusk in the family Anatomidae.

== Description ==
The length of the shell varies between 1 mm and 4 mm. The globose, pearly white shell slopes toward the periphery. It is delicate, semitransparent, and glossy. The sculpture consists of numerous fine, curved, longitudinal ribs, interrupted by the slit fasciole, closer on the base, intersected by minute spiral striae in the interstices. The thin epidermis is caducous, and pale yellowish-brown. The spire is usually rather depressed, but variable. The four whorls are flattened above, rapidly enlarging. The slit is long and narrow, nearly central. The slit fasciole is deep, striated across. The edges are somewhat thick, sharp, and prominent . The rounded aperture is oblique. The peristome is continuous. The outer lip is thin. The inner lip is folded back on the columella. The umbilicus is deep, but exposing only the body whorl. The operculum is very delicate, with numerous whorls, the last large.

== Distribution ==
This species has a wide distribution. It occurs in circumarctic waters (Greenland, Canada, Baffin Island, Queen Elisabeth Islands, Labrador), in European waters, the Mediterranean Sea, in the Atlantic Ocean off the Azores, Cape Verde, Angola; in the Northwest Atlantic Ocean (Florida, the Bahamas), in the West Indies, in the Pacific Ocean off California and Japan.

This species has been cited from multiple localities throughout the North Atlantic, but most records are inaccurate due to confusion with Anatoma aspera (mostly), A. tenuisculpta and A. orbiculata. Therefore, records which are not backed by an illustration or a specimen should be disregarded.
