= Sasakiconcha =

- Sasakiconcha elegantissima

Scientific classification
- Kingdom: Animalia
- Phylum: Mollusca
- Class: Gastropoda
- Subclass: Vetigastropoda
- Order: Lepetellida
- Family: Anatomidae
- Genus: Sasakiconcha; Geiger, 2006

Genus of gastropods

Sasakiconcha is a genus of sea snails, marine gastropod mollusks in the family Anatomidae.

== Species ==
Species within the genus Sasakiconcha include:

- Sasakiconcha elegantissima Geiger, 2006
