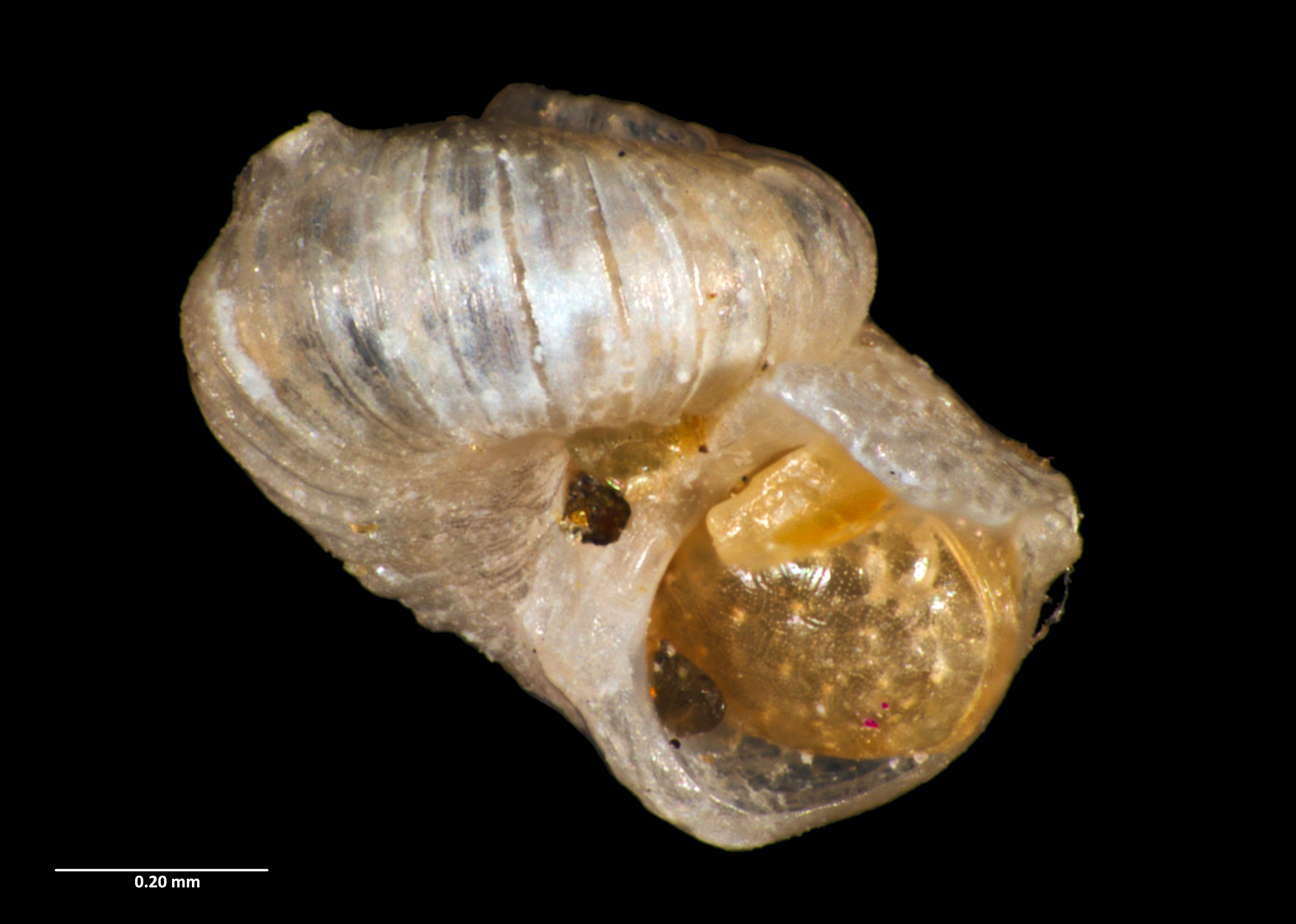
- Shell of Scissurella prendrevillei (specimen at the Auckland War Memorial Museum)

Scientific classification
- Kingdom: Animalia
- Phylum: Mollusca
- Class: Gastropoda
- Subclass: Vetigastropoda
- Order: Lepetellida
- Family: Scissurellidae
- Genus: Scissurella
- Species: S. prendrevillei

Binomial name
- Scissurella prendrevillei Powell, 1933

Synonyms
- Scissurella fairchildi Powell, 1933; Scissurella marshalli Bandel, 1998; Scissurella stellae Fleming, 1948

= Scissurella prendrevillei =

Species of gastropod

Scissurella prendrevillei is a species of small sea snail, a marine gastropod mollusc in the family Scissurellidae.

== Distribution ==
This marine species occurs off New Zealand.
