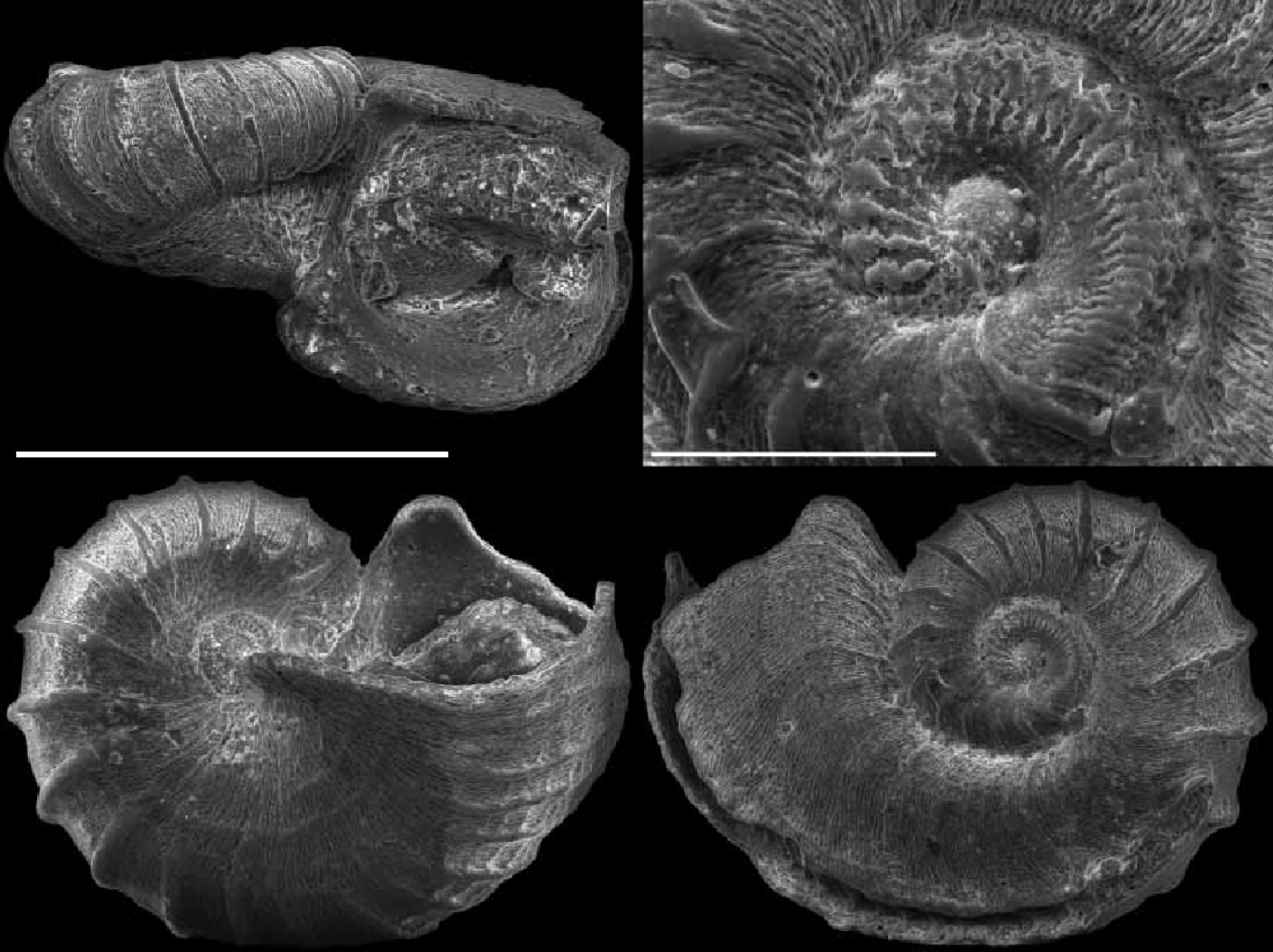

Scientific classification
- Kingdom: Animalia
- Phylum: Mollusca
- Class: Gastropoda
- Subclass: Vetigastropoda
- Order: Lepetellida
- Family: Scissurellidae
- Genus: Scissurella
- Species: S. maraisorum

Binomial name
- Scissurella maraisorum Geiger, 2006

= Scissurella maraisorum =

Species of gastropod

Scissurella maraisorum is a species of small sea snail, a marine gastropod mollusc in the family Scissurellidae.
