= Scissurella quadrata =

Scientific classification
- Kingdom: Animalia
- Phylum: Mollusca
- Class: Gastropoda
- Subclass: Vetigastropoda
- Order: Lepetellida
- Family: Scissurellidae
- Genus: Scissurella
- Species: S. quadrata

Binomial name
- Scissurella quadrata Geiger & Jansen, 2004

Species of gastropod

Scissurella quadrata is a species of small sea snail, a marine gastropod mollusk in the family Scissurellidae.

== Distribution ==
This marine species occurs off the Society Islands and Australia.
