= Scissurella spinosa =

Scientific classification
- Kingdom: Animalia
- Phylum: Mollusca
- Class: Gastropoda
- Subclass: Vetigastropoda
- Order: Lepetellida
- Family: Scissurellidae
- Genus: Scissurella
- Species: S. spinosa

Binomial name
- Scissurella spinosa Geiger & Jansen, 2004

Species of gastropod

Scissurella spinosa is a species of small sea snail, a marine gastropod mollusk in the family Scissurellidae.

== Distribution ==
This marine species occurs off Australia and French Polynesia.
