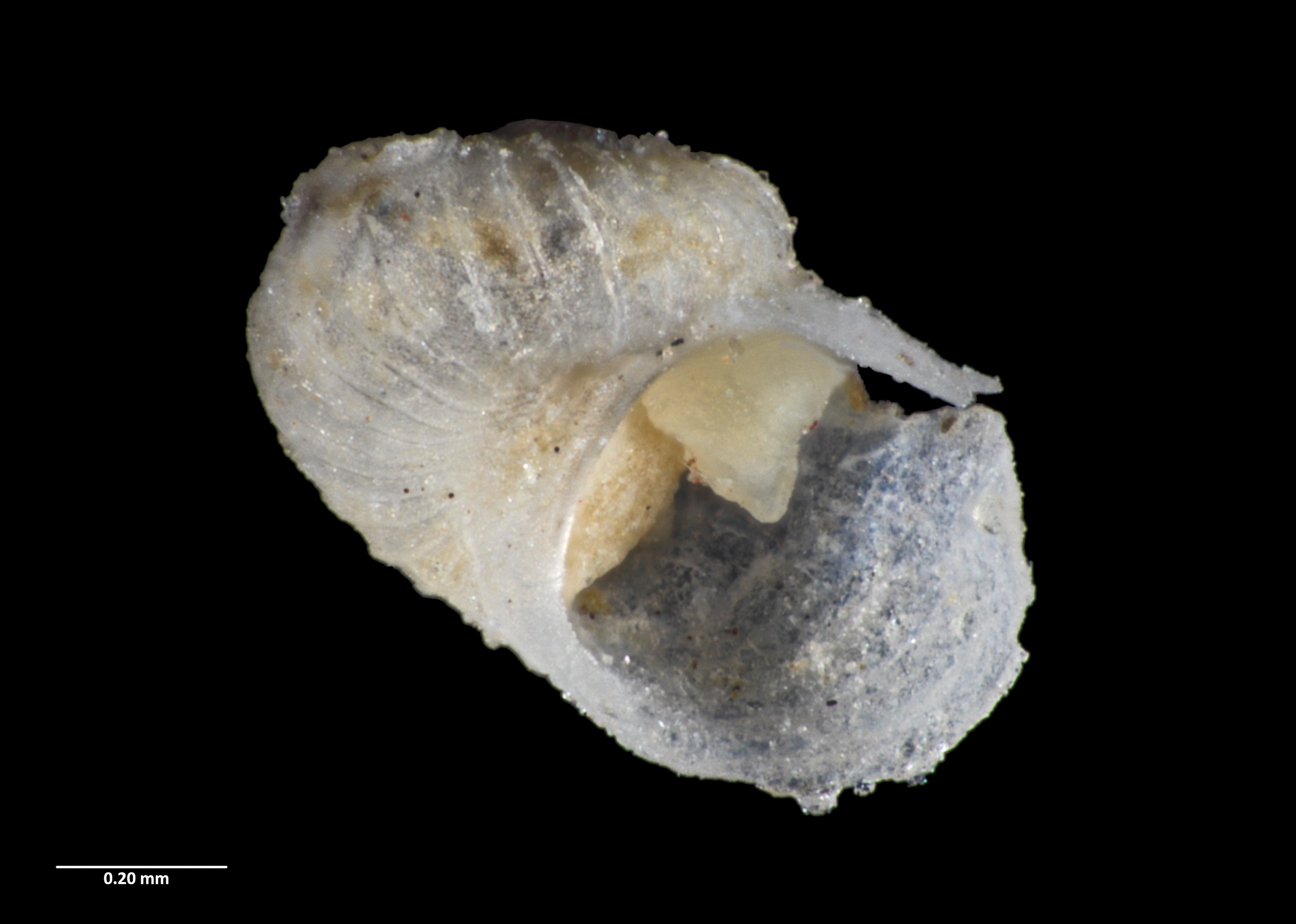
- Scissurella bountyensis

Scientific classification
- Kingdom: Animalia
- Phylum: Mollusca
- Class: Gastropoda
- Subclass: Vetigastropoda
- Order: Lepetellida
- Family: Scissurellidae
- Genus: Scissurella
- Species: S. bountyensis

Binomial name
- Scissurella bountyensis Powell, 1933

= Scissurella bountyensis =

Species of gastropod

Scissurella bountyensis is a species of minute sea snail, a marine gastropod mollusc in the family Scissurellidae.

== Distribution ==
This marine species occurs off the Bounty Islands, New Zealand.
