= Scissurella alto =

Scientific classification
- Kingdom: Animalia
- Phylum: Mollusca
- Class: Gastropoda
- Subclass: Vetigastropoda
- Order: Lepetellida
- Family: Scissurellidae
- Genus: Scissurella
- Species: S. alto

Binomial name
- Scissurella alto Geiger, 2003

Species of gastropod

Scissurella alto is a species of small sea snail, a marine gastropod mollusc in the family Scissurellidae.

== Distribution ==
This species occurs in the Pacific Ocean off Easter Island
