= Scissurella azorensis =

Scientific classification
- Kingdom: Animalia
- Phylum: Mollusca
- Class: Gastropoda
- Subclass: Vetigastropoda
- Order: Lepetellida
- Family: Scissurellidae
- Genus: Scissurella
- Species: S. azorensis

Binomial name
- Scissurella azorensis Nolt, 2008

Species of gastropod

Scissurella azorensis is a species of small sea snail, a marine gastropod mollusk in the family Scissurellidae.

== Distribution ==
This species occurs in the Atlantic Ocean off the Azores and in the Mediterranean Sea.
