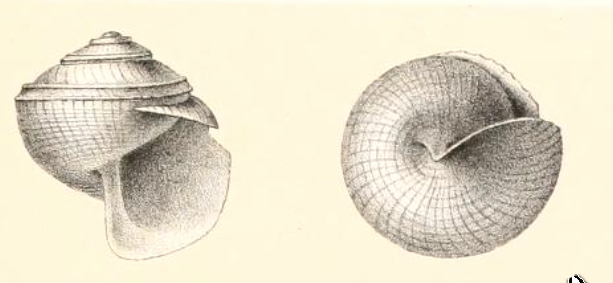
- Shell of Anatoma alta (holotype)

Scientific classification
- Kingdom: Animalia
- Phylum: Mollusca
- Class: Gastropoda
- Subclass: Vetigastropoda
- Order: Lepetellida
- Family: Anatomidae
- Genus: Anatoma
- Species: A. alta

Binomial name
- Anatoma alta (R.B. Watson, 1886)

Synonyms
- Scissurella alta Watson, 1886 (original combination)

= Anatoma alta =

Species of gastropod

Anatoma alta is a species of small sea snail, a marine gastropod mollusk or micromollusk in the family Anatomidae.

== Description ==
The shell grows to a length of 2.5 mm. The thin, white shell has a globose shape. It is transparent and strongly sculptured. It has a tumid base, a small umbilical chink. It has a short subscalar spire (on which the old canal slit forms the edge of the successive whorls), and a smallish somewhat prominent rounded tip. Its sculpture shows frequent, strongish, rounded, longitudinals. The curved riblets radiate out from the sutures. They are of much the same strength on the base as above. The spirals are located at about one-third of its height from the suture. The body whorl is somewhat feebly carinated by the old canal scar, which is depressed and finely scored across between the narrow slightly projecting edges of the lip. On the upper surface a few very obsolete spirals may be seen. The whole base is reticulated by spiral threads, which are closer set, but almost as strong as the radiating riblets. The conical spire is rather depressed and rises regularly to the extreme tip. The apex is round and prominent. The five whorls are flat and sloping above. They are carinated below the carina towards the mouth slightly openly constricted and then tumid on the base. The suture is impressed. The aperture is round. The outer lip is freely curved. The thin inner lip is concave at the base of the columella, straight, rounded, and very much expanded on the columella with an angulated and very patulous junction to the outer lip in front. There is a small umbilical furrow and chink half hidden behind it. (original description by Watson)

== Distribution ==
This species occurs in the Caribbean Sea, the Gulf of Mexico and in the Atlantic Ocean off Brazil, the Azores and Tristan da Cunha at depths between 20 mm and 820 m.
