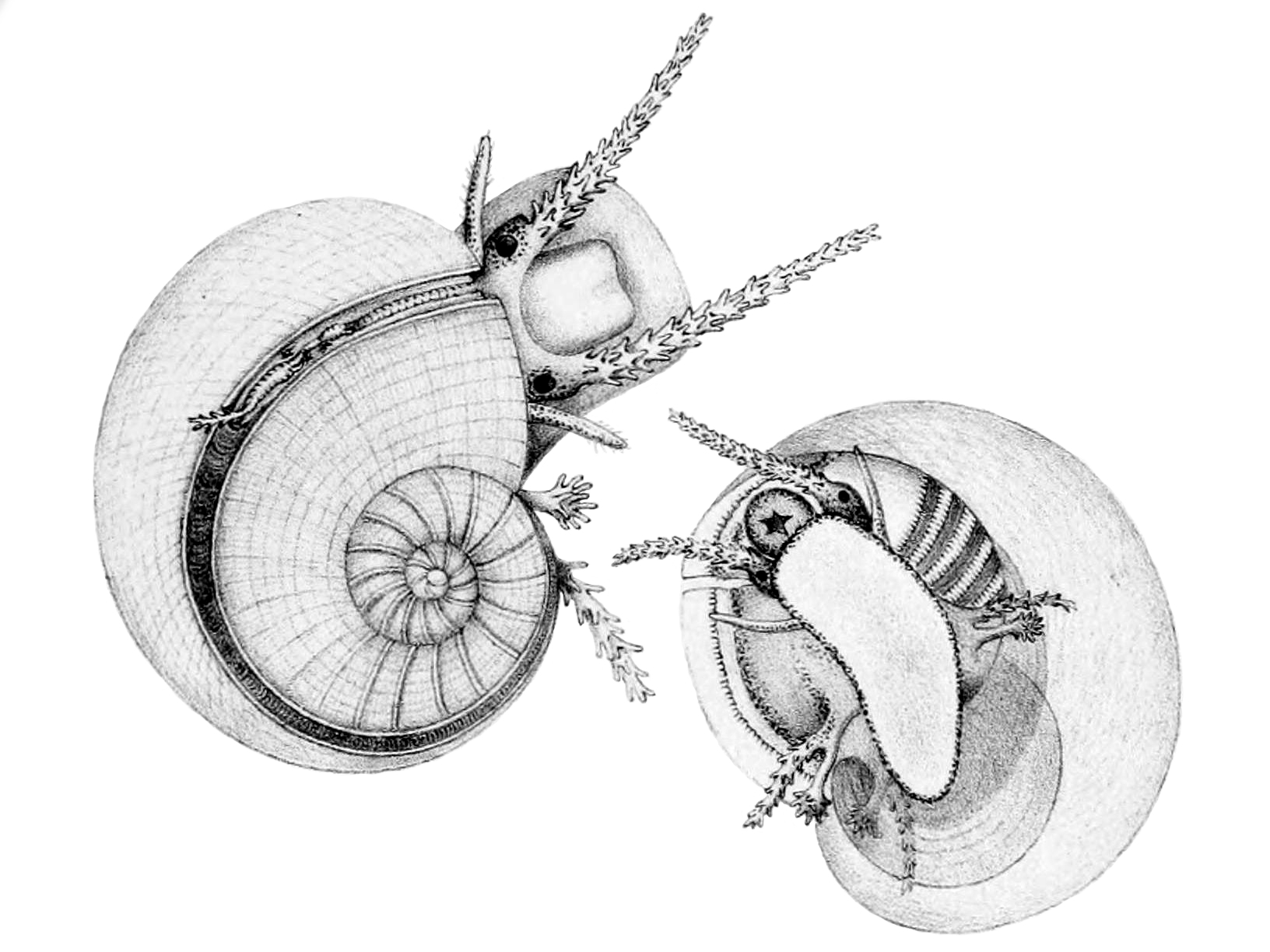
- Drawing of the Scissurella costata

Scientific classification
- Kingdom: Animalia
- Phylum: Mollusca
- Class: Gastropoda
- Subclass: Vetigastropoda
- Order: Lepetellida
- Family: Scissurellidae
- Genus: Scissurella
- Species: S. costata

Binomial name
- Scissurella costata d'Orbigny, 1824

Synonyms
- Argonanta uniumbilicatus O. G. Costa, 1828; Delphinula calcaroides Cantraine, 1842; Padollus orbignyi O. G. Costa, 1839; Scissurella cancellata Jeffreys, 1856; Scissurella decipiens O.G. Costa, 1861; † Scissurella decussata d'Orbigny, 1824; Scissurella dorbignyi Scacchi, 1836; † Scissurella elegans d'Orbigny, 1824; Scissurella laevigata d'Orbigny, 1824; Scissurella plicata Philippi, 1836; Scissurella striatula Philippi, 1844

= Scissurella costata =

Species of gastropod

Scissurella costata is a species of small sea snail, a marine gastropod mollusk in the family Scissurellidae.

== Description ==
The size of the shell varies between 1 mm and 2.5 mm. The thin, white shell is transparent. The spire is depressed, and composed of 4 whorls that are plane on their upper surfaces, strongly carinated at the periphery, and convex below the carina. The body whorl is very large, and widely umbilicated. The oblique aperture is subquadrangular. The simple columella is arcuate. The simple lip is sinuous, with a narrow profound fissure. The slit fasciole forms the carina of the whorls, with elevated, lamellar edges, and arcuate growth lamellae. The umbilicus is broad and deep. It is carinated at the border. The surface is sculptured with arcuate longitudinal riblets, widely spaced and a little undulating, and fine spiral striae.

== Distribution ==
This marine species occurs off Spain (Tenerife), Canary Islands), Portugal (Madeira)and in the Mediterranean Sea and the Adriatic Sea.
