= Anatomidae =

- Sasakiconcha elegantissima

Scientific classification
- Kingdom: Animalia
- Phylum: Mollusca
- Class: Gastropoda
- Subclass: Vetigastropoda
- Order: Lepetellida
- Superfamily: Scissurelloidea
- Family: Anatomidae; J. H. McLean, 1989

Genera
- See text

Synonyms
- Anatominae; Schizotrochidae Iredale & McMichael, 1962 (n.a.)

Family of gastropods

Anatomidae is a family of small sea snails, marine gastropod mollusks in the clade Vetigastropoda (according to the taxonomy of the Gastropoda by Bouchet & Rocroi, 2005).

Anatomidae was raised to the rank of subfamily to the rank of family in a study by Geiger & Jansen (2004). Bouchet & Rocroi placed it in the superfamily Scissurelloidea. This was disputed in 2008 by Yasunori Kano who does not believe that Anatomidae should be separated from Scissurellidae and actually states that it is the subfamily Anatominae. He suggests that this result was induced by contamination or mislabelling.

This family has no subfamilies.

== Genera ==
Genera within the family Anatomidae include:

- Anatoma Woodward, 1859
- Sasakiconcha Geiger, 2006

Genera brought into synonymy

- Hainella Bandel, 1998: synonym of Anatoma Woodward, 1859
- Schizotrochus Monterosato, 1877: synonym of Anatoma Woodward, 1859
- Thieleella Bandel, 1998: synonym of Anatoma Woodward, 1859
