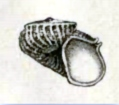
- Shell of Scissurella costata

Scientific classification
- Kingdom: Animalia
- Phylum: Mollusca
- Class: Gastropoda
- Subclass: Vetigastropoda
- Order: Lepetellida
- Superfamily: Scissurelloidea; Gray, 1847

= Scissurelloidea =

Superfamily of gastropods

Scissurelloidea is a taxonomic superfamily of small sea snails, marine gastropod mollusks or micromollusks in the subclass Vetigastropoda.

== Taxonomy ==
This superfamily consists of two following families (according to the taxonomy of the Gastropoda by Bouchet & Rocroi, 2005):

- Family Scissurellidae Gray, 1847
- Family Anatomidae McLean, 1989

Geiger (2009) updated two other subfamilies to family level:

Superfamily Scissurelloidea:

- Family Anatomidae
- Family Depressizonidae
- Family Larocheidae
- Family Scissurellidae
