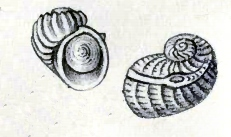
- Drawing with two views of a shell of Sinezona cingulata

Scientific classification
- Kingdom: Animalia
- Phylum: Mollusca
- Class: Gastropoda
- Subclass: Vetigastropoda
- Order: Lepetellida
- Family: Scissurellidae
- Genus: Sinezona; Finlay, 1927

Type species
- Schismope brevis Hedley, 1904

Synonyms
- Schismope; Woodwardia; Ariella Bandel, 1998; Daizona Bandel, 1998

= Sinezona =

Genus of sea snails

Sinezona is a genus of minute sea snails, marine gastropod mollusks or micromollusks in the family Scissurellidae, the little slit shells.

== Description ==
The shell has turbinate or depressed turbinate form. The anal fissure is closed, forming a foramen in the outer wall of the aperture. The slit fasciole is shorter, not over 1½ whorls in length.

Sinezona is a Scissurella in which the anal slit becomes closed in the adult, and transformed into an oblong perforation like one of the holes of a Haliotis.

== Distribution ==
This marine genus occurs worldwide.

== Species ==
Species in the genus Sinezona include:

- Sinezona bandeli Marshall, 2002
- Sinezona beddomei (Petterd, 1884)
- Sinezona brevis (Hedley, 1904)
- Sinezona brucei Geiger, 2012
- Sinezona calumnior Geiger, 2012
- Sinezona carolarum Geiger & McLean, 2010
- Sinezona chilensis Geiger, 2012
- Sinezona cingulata (O.G. Costa, 1861)
- Sinezona confusa Rolán & Luque, 1994
- Sinezona costulata Geiger & Sasaki, 2009
- Sinezona danieldreieri Geiger, 2008
- Sinezona doliolum Herbert, 1986
- Sinezona enigmatica Geiger & B.A. Marshall, 2012
- Sinezona ferriezi (Crosse, 1867)
- Sinezona finlayi (Laws, 1948)
- Sinezona garciai Geiger, 2006
- † Sinezona geigeri Landau, Van Dingenen & Ceulemans, 2017
- Sinezona globosa Geiger, 2006
- † Sinezona haliotimorpha Lozouet, 1998
- Sinezona hawaiiensis Geiger & McLean, 2010
- Sinezona insignis (E.A. Smith, 1910)
- Sinezona insularis Simone, 2009
- Sinezona iota (Finlay, 1926)
- Sinezona kayae Geiger & McLean, 2010
- † Sinezona kondoi
- † Sinezona koruahina (Laws, 1936)
- Sinezona laqueus (Finlay, 1926)
- Sinezona levigata (Iredale, 1908)
- Sinezona macleani Geiger, 2006
- Sinezona marrowi Geiger, 2012
- Sinezona mechanica Geiger & B.A. Marshall, 2012
- Sinezona milleri Geiger & Sasaki, 2009
- Sinezona mouchezi (Vélain, 1876)
- Sinezona norfolkensis Geiger, 2012
- Sinezona pacifica (Oliver, 1915)
- Sinezona pauperata (Powell, 1933)
- Sinezona platyspira Geiger & B.A. Marshall, 2012
- Sinezona plicata (Hedley, 1899)
- † Sinezona praecedens Lozouet, 1998
- Sinezona rimuloides (Carpenter, 1865) - rim scissurelle
- Sinezona semicostata Burnay & Rolán, 1990
- Sinezona singeri Geiger, 2006
- Sinezona singulata (O. G Costa)
- Sinezona subantarctica (Hedley, 1916)
- † Sinezona tertia (Laws, 1940)
- Sinezona wanganellica Geiger & B.A. Marshall, 2012
- Sinezona wileyi Geiger, 2008
- Sinezona zimmeri Geiger, 2003

Nomine dubia

- Sinezona concinna (G. B. Sowerby I, 1831)
- Sinezona miranda (A. Adams, 1862)
- Sinezona modesta (A. Adams, 1862)
- Sinezona paumotuensis (Garrett, 1872)

Species brought into synonymy

- Sinezona armillata Yaron, 1983: synonym of Sukashitrochus armillatus (Yaron, 1983)
- Sinezona atkinsoni Tenison-Woods, J.E., 1877: synonym of Sukashitrochus atkinsoni (Tenison Woods, 1877)
- Sinezona brasiliensis Mattar, 1987: synonym of Satondella brasiliensis (Mattar, 1987)
- Sinezona carinata (Adams, A., 1862): synonym of Sukashitrochus carinatus (A. Adams, 1862)
- Sinezona crossei (Folin, L. de, 1869): synonym of Sinezona cingulata (O. G. Costa, 1861)
- Sinezona fayalensis (Dautzenberg, 1889): synonym of Sinezona cingulata (O. G. Costa, 1861)
- Sinezona lobini Burnay & Rolán, 1990: synonym of Scissurella lobini (Burnay & Rolan, 1990)
- Sinezona morleti (Crosse, 1880): synonym of Sukashitrochus morleti (Crosse, 1880)
- Sinezona lyallensis (Finlay, 1927): synonym of Sukashitrochus lyallensis (Finlay, 1926)
- Sinezona padangensis (Thiele, 1912): synonym of Sinezona ferriezi (Crosse, 1867)
- Sinezona pulchra (Petterd, 1884): synonym of Sukashitrochus pulcher (Petterd, 1884)
- Sinezona redferni Rolán, 1996: synonym of Scissurella redferni (Rolán, 1996)
- Sinezona tricarinata Yaron, 1983: synonym of Sukashitrochus tricarinatus (Yaron, 1983)
