= Ariella (gastropod) =

Scientific classification
- Kingdom: Animalia
- Phylum: Mollusca
- Class: Gastropoda
- Subclass: Vetigastropoda
- Order: Lepetellida
- Family: Scissurellidae
- Genus: Ariella; Bandel, 1998

Type species
- † Ariella haliotimorpha Bandel, 1998

Genus of gastropods

Ariella is a genus of minute sea snails, marine gastropod mollusks or micromollusks in the family Scissurellidae, the little slit snails.

== Species ==
Species within the genus Ariella include:

- † Ariella haliotimorpha Bandel, 1998

Species brought into synonymy

- Ariella campbelli Bandel, 1998: synonym of Sinezona levigata (Iredale, 1908)
- Ariella lacuniformis (Watson, 1886): synonym of Macromphalina lacuniformis (Watson, 1886) (species inquirenda)
- Ariella pauperata (Powell, 1933): synonym of Sinezona pauperata Powell, 1933
- Ariella subantarctica (Hedley, 1916): synonym of Sinezona subantarctica (Hedley, 1916)
