= S. rosea =

S. rosea may refer to:

- Sarracenia rosea, a newly named species from Sarracenia purpurea
- Scissurona rosea, a minute sea snail species
- Solanella rosea, the single species in the monotypic genus Solanella

== See also ==
- Rosea (disambiguation)
