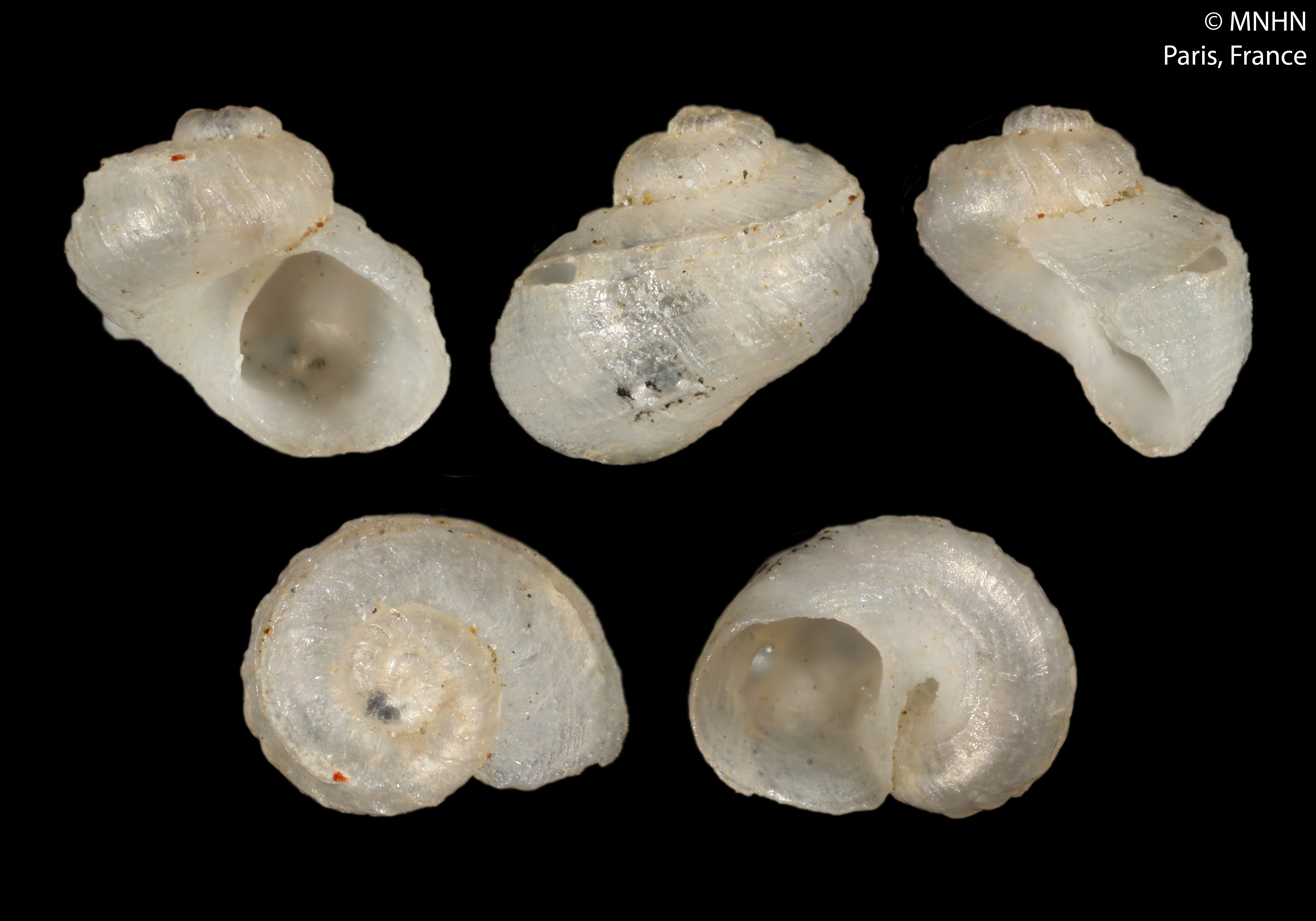

Scientific classification
- Kingdom: Animalia
- Phylum: Mollusca
- Class: Gastropoda
- Subclass: Vetigastropoda
- Order: Lepetellida
- Superfamily: Scissurelloidea
- Family: Scissurellidae
- Genus: Sinezona
- Species: S. carolarum

Binomial name
- Sinezona carolarum Geiger & McLean, 2010

= Sinezona carolarum =

Species of gastropod

Sinezona carolarum is a species of small sea snail, a marine gastropod mollusk or micromollusk in the family Scissurellidae, the little slit snails.

== Distribution ==
This species occurs in the Pacific Ocean off Easter Island and the Clipperton Island.
