= Sinezona danieldreieri =

Scientific classification
- Kingdom: Animalia
- Phylum: Mollusca
- Class: Gastropoda
- Subclass: Vetigastropoda
- Order: Lepetellida
- Family: Scissurellidae
- Genus: Sinezona
- Species: S. danieldreieri

Binomial name
- Sinezona danieldreieri Geiger, 2008

Species of gastropod

Sinezona danieldreieri is a species of small sea snail, a marine gastropod mollusk or micromollusk in the family Scissurellidae, the little slit shells.

== Distribution ==
This marine species occurs off the Austral Islands, French Polynesia
