= Sinezona insignis =

Scientific classification
- Kingdom: Animalia
- Phylum: Mollusca
- Class: Gastropoda
- Subclass: Vetigastropoda
- Order: Lepetellida
- Superfamily: Scissurelloidea
- Family: Scissurellidae
- Genus: Sinezona
- Species: S. insignis

Binomial name
- Sinezona insignis (E. A. Smith, 1910)

Synonyms
- Schismope insignis E. A. Smith, 1910

Species of gastropod

Sinezona insignis is a species of small sea snail, a marine gastropod mollusk or micromollusk in the family Scissurellidae, the small slit snails.

== Description ==
The shell grows to a height of 1 mm.

== Distribution ==
This marine species occurs off KwaZuluNatal, Port Alfred, South Africa; in the Indian Ocean off Réunion.
