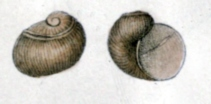
- Drawing with two views of a shell of Sinezona ferriezi

Scientific classification
- Kingdom: Animalia
- Phylum: Mollusca
- Class: Gastropoda
- Subclass: Vetigastropoda
- Order: Lepetellida
- Superfamily: Scissurelloidea
- Family: Scissurellidae
- Genus: Sinezona
- Species: S. ferriezi

Binomial name
- Sinezona ferriezi (Crosse, 1867)

Synonyms
- Schismope ferriezi Crosse, 1867; Schismope padangensis (Thiele, 1912); Scissurella padangensis Thiele, 1912; Sinezona padangensis (Thiele, 1912)

= Sinezona ferriezi =

Species of gastropod

Sinezona ferriezi is a species of small sea snail, a marine gastropod mollusk or micromollusk in the family Scissurellidae, the little slit snails.

== Description ==
The height of the yellowish-white shell reaches 1½ mm. The umbilicate shell has a turbinate-subdepressed shape. It is longitudinally and subobliquely striatulate. The short spire is obtuse; The spire consists of 3-3½ whorls. The first whorl is smooth, and separated by simple sutures. The remaining whorls are rather plane, lamellosely bicarinate above the middle, channelled between the carinae. The body whorl is subdescending, and is a little constricted just below the carina, then inflated and convex. The groove terminates a short distance behind the lip in an oblong foramen, which does not attain the edge of the lip, a smooth space intervening. The aperture is ovate-rounded. The simple peristome is thin, acute, and subcontinuous.

== Distribution ==
This marine species occurs off New Caledonia.
