= Incisura lytteltonensis =

Scientific classification
- Kingdom: Animalia
- Phylum: Mollusca
- Class: Gastropoda
- Subclass: Vetigastropoda
- Order: Lepetellida
- Family: Scissurellidae
- Genus: Incisura
- Species: I. lytteltonensis

Binomial name
- Incisura lytteltonensis (E. A. Smith, 1894)

Synonyms
- Scissurella lytteltonensis E. A. Smith, 1894

Species of sea snail

Incisura lytteltonensis is a species of sea snail, a keyhole limpet, a marine gastropod mollusc in the family Scissurellidae.

== Distribution ==
This marine species occurs off New Zealand.
