= Coronadoa simonsae =

Scientific classification
- Kingdom: Animalia
- Phylum: Mollusca
- Class: Gastropoda
- Subclass: Vetigastropoda
- Order: Lepetellida
- Superfamily: Scissurelloidea
- Family: Scissurellidae
- Genus: Coronadoa
- Species: C. simonsae

Binomial name
- Coronadoa simonsae Bartsch, 1946

Species of gastropod

Coronadoa simonsae is a species of small sea snail, a marine gastropod mollusk or micromollusk in the family Scissurellidae, the little slit snails.
