= Sinezona pacifica =

Scientific classification
- Kingdom: Animalia
- Phylum: Mollusca
- Class: Gastropoda
- Subclass: Vetigastropoda
- Order: Lepetellida
- Family: Scissurellidae
- Genus: Sinezona
- Species: S. pacifica

Binomial name
- Sinezona pacifica (Oliver, 1915)

Synonyms
- Daizona pacifica Bandel, 1998; Schismope pacifica Oliver, 1915

Species of gastropod

Sinezona pacifica is a species of small sea snail, a marine gastropod mollusk or micromollusk in the family Scissurellidae, the little slit shells.

== Description ==
The height of the shell reaches 1 mm. The width of the shell is greater than the height, with a low spire. The shells are white.

== Distribution ==
This marine species occurs off New Zealand, Lord Howe Island, Norfolk Island and Macquarie Island; New South Wales, and Southwest Western Australia.
