= Depressizona axiosculpta =

Scientific classification
- Kingdom: Animalia
- Phylum: Mollusca
- Class: Gastropoda
- Subclass: Vetigastropoda
- Order: Lepetellida
- Family: Depressizonidae
- Genus: Depressizona
- Species: D. axiosculpta

Binomial name
- Depressizona axiosculpta Geiger, 2009

Species of gastropod

Depressizona axiosculpta is a species of sea snail, a marine gastropod mollusc in the family Depressizonidae.

It has also been placed in Scissurellidae.

== Description ==
The shape of the shell is calyptraeiform.

== Distribution ==
There is only one specimen in poor condition known from Tonga.
