= Temnozaga parilis =

Scientific classification
- Kingdom: Animalia
- Phylum: Mollusca
- Class: Gastropoda
- Subclass: Vetigastropoda
- Order: Lepetellida
- Family: Sutilizonidae
- Genus: Temnozaga
- Species: T. parilis

Binomial name
- Temnozaga parilis McLean, 1989

Species of gastropod

Temnozaga parilis is a species of sea snail, a marine gastropod mollusk in the family Sutilizonidae.
