= Sinezona singeri =

Scientific classification
- Kingdom: Animalia
- Phylum: Mollusca
- Class: Gastropoda
- Subclass: Vetigastropoda
- Order: Lepetellida
- Family: Scissurellidae
- Genus: Sinezona
- Species: S. singeri

Binomial name
- Sinezona singeri Geiger, 2006

Species of gastropod

Sinezona singeri is a species of small sea snail, a marine gastropod mollusk or micromollusk in the family Scissurellidae, the little slit shells. The species is characterized by its medium-sized shell, with constriction below the selenizone and irregular spaced fine axials. It was discovered in the Red Sea and its range spreads across the Western Indian Ocean. The species eat algae from their silt substrates and are preyed upon by fish or starfish.

== Description ==
Scissurellids are a diverse family with many undiscovered species remaining. They are microgastropods, which includes all species of gastropods below 5mm in size. Sinezona singeri are about 1.6 mm tall and trochiform, having a depressed conical shape. Their Protoconch, or first shell is smooth and not fully defined in shape. The teloconch-I is more defined with 12-13 axial cords. Finally the teloconch-II has finer and irregularly spaced axials with a bigger whorl.

== Habitat ==
These small gastropods can be found at depths up to 4000 meters, but are most often present in intertidal zones. They are found in silt substrates where they camouflage from predators, and can forage. They eat algae at a constant rate, moving slightly from the waves or their own limited motion to forage. They are found in the Red Sea, near Egypt and Israel, and have been found around Madagascar, the Glorioso Islands, Mayotte, and Réunion.

== Behavior ==
Scissurellids swim for short distances in order to avoid predation. They move by extending their foot and making some struggling motions that propel them. They also have the ability to execute Diel vertical migration from sand and silt substrates to blades of seagrass or plants. S. singeri eat a range of algae on these different substrates. Specific predators are not well researched, but include different local fish and starfish. When mating, Scissurellids congregate nocturnally in big swarms initiated by some sort of lunar cues. Males release white clouds from the slit in their shell; while females focus the egg release through the margins of their apertural lip. The fertilized eggs attach to algae and hatch into a larval state. More specifics of life history are not yet well researched.

== Taxonomy ==
This species was discovered in the Red Sea in 2006 by Benjamin (Solly) Singer. It is distinguished by its constriction below the selenizone and irregular spaced fine axials in the teloconch-II. The teloconch-I/II have a convex shoulder that distinguish it from a similar looking S. hoernesi.

== Conservation status ==
While limited data exists on the status or populations of the S. singeri, larger gastropod trends give insight into future threats to the species. One of the biggest threats to organisms relying on Calcium carbonate to form shells is Ocean acidification. In a study done on Crepidula fornicata it was found that a pH of 7.6 resulted in significantly decreased juvenile growth rates, and a pH of 7.5 resulted in increased larval mortality. The global ocean pH is 8.1, but models show it could be as low as 7.7 by 2100. Regional areas of lower pH make local extinction a threat. The Lysocline is a natural system in which dissolution of calcium carbonate structures increases at lower depths. The saturation horizon is the point at which rates of dissolution rapidly increase past what a calcifier can compensate for. The saturation horizon is raising globally due to increased CO_{2} in the atmosphere being captured by the ocean.
