= Incisura auriformis =

Scientific classification
- Kingdom: Animalia
- Phylum: Mollusca
- Class: Gastropoda
- Subclass: Vetigastropoda
- Order: Lepetellida
- Family: Scissurellidae
- Genus: Incisura
- Species: I. auriformis

Binomial name
- Incisura auriformis Geiger & Jansen, 2004

Species of gastropod

Incisura auriformis is a species of sea snail, a marine gastropod mollusk in the family Scissurellidae.

== Distribution ==
This marine species occurs off Australia.
