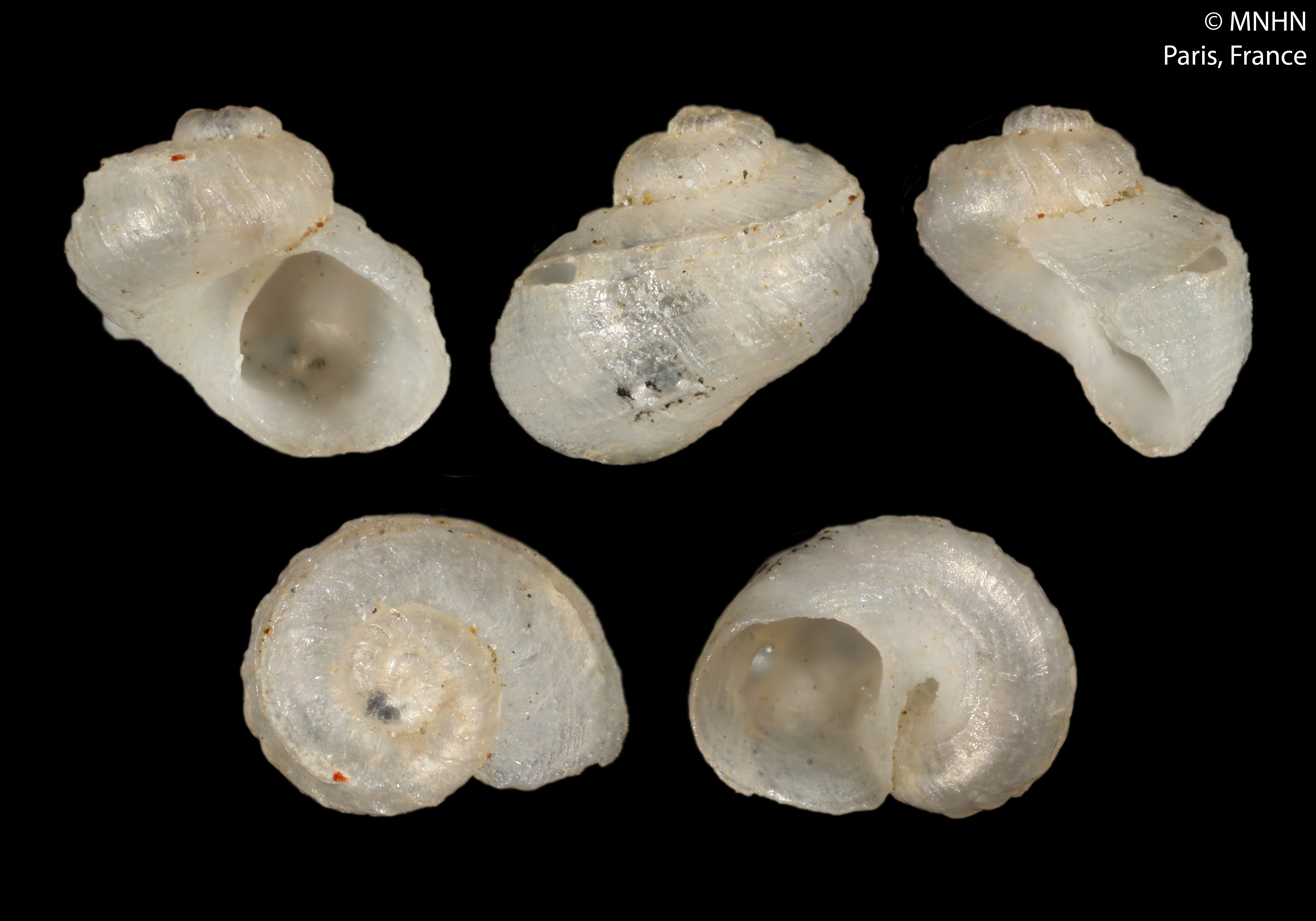
- Shell of Sinezona mouchezi (lectotype at MNHN, Paris)

Scientific classification
- Kingdom: Animalia
- Phylum: Mollusca
- Class: Gastropoda
- Subclass: Vetigastropoda
- Order: Lepetellida
- Superfamily: Scissurelloidea
- Family: Scissurellidae
- Genus: Sinezona
- Species: S. mouchezi

Binomial name
- Sinezona mouchezi (Vélain, 1877)

Synonyms
- Schismope mouchezi Vélain, 1877

= Sinezona mouchezi =

Species of gastropod

Sinezona mouchezi is a species of small sea snail, a marine gastropod mollusk or micromollusk in the family Scissurellidae, the little slit snails.

== Description ==
The length of the shell attains 2 mm.

== Distribution ==
This marine species occurs off St Paul Island, Southern Indian Ocean.
