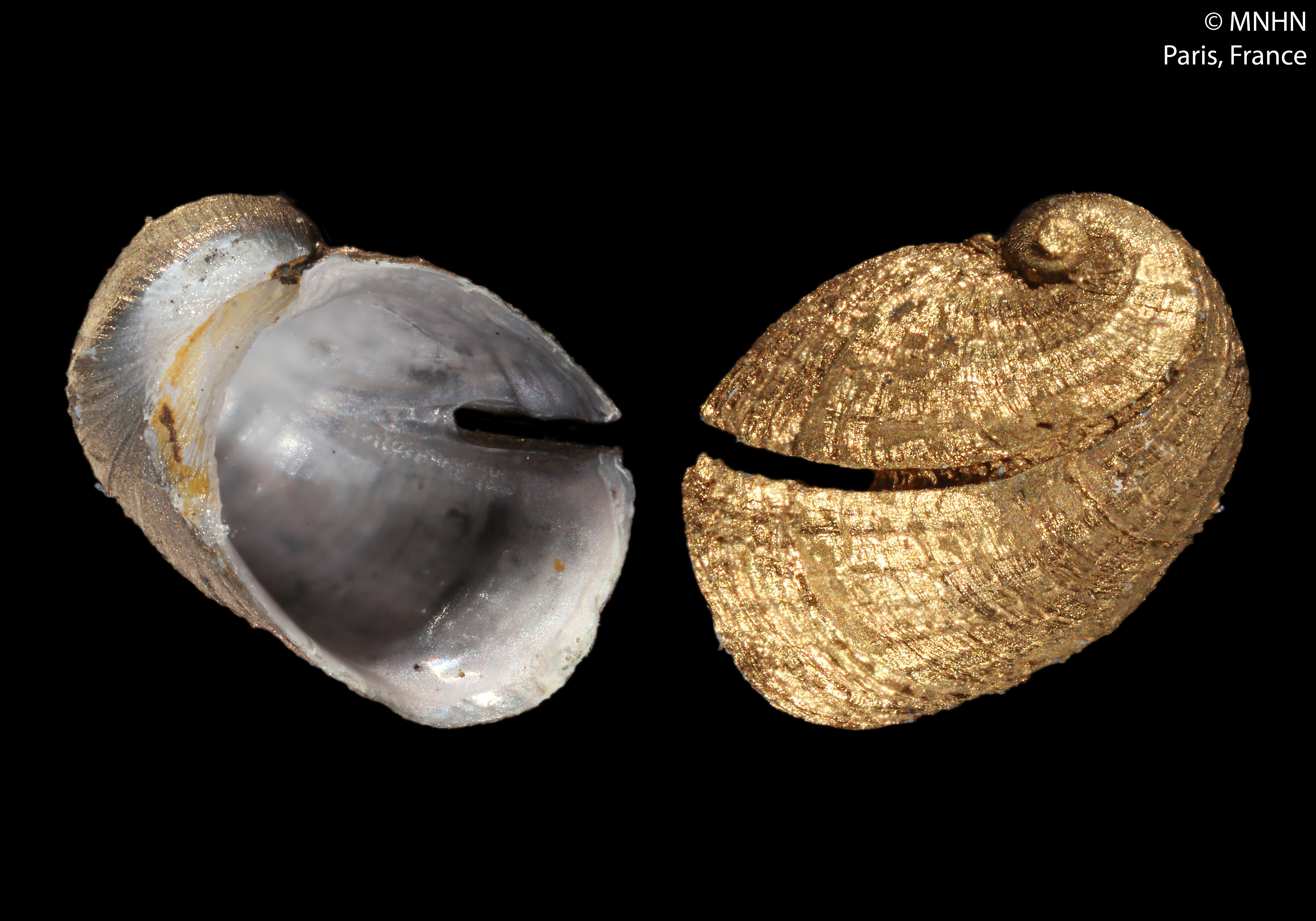
- Shell of Sutilizona pterodon (holotype at MNHN? Paris)

Scientific classification
- Kingdom: Animalia
- Phylum: Mollusca
- Class: Gastropoda
- Subclass: Vetigastropoda
- Order: Lepetellida
- Family: Sutilizonidae
- Genus: Sutilizona
- Species: S. pterodon

Binomial name
- Sutilizona pterodon Warén & Bouchet, 2001

= Sutilizona pterodon =

Species of gastropod

Sutilizona pterodon is a species of sea snail, a marine gastropod mollusc in the family Sutilizonidae.

== Description ==
The shell grows to a size of 2 mm.

== Distribution ==
This marine species occurs off the Mid-Atlantic Ridge.
