= Sinezona hawaiiensis =

Scientific classification
- Kingdom: Animalia
- Phylum: Mollusca
- Class: Gastropoda
- Subclass: Vetigastropoda
- Order: Lepetellida
- Superfamily: Scissurelloidea
- Family: Scissurellidae
- Genus: Sinezona
- Species: S. hawaiiensis

Binomial name
- Sinezona hawaiiensis Geiger & McLean, 2010

Species of gastropod

Sinezona hawaiiensis is a species of small sea snail, a marine gastropod mollusk or micromollusk in the family Scissurellidae, the little slit snails.
