= Satondella danieli =

Scientific classification
- Kingdom: Animalia
- Phylum: Mollusca
- Class: Gastropoda
- Subclass: Vetigastropoda
- Order: Lepetellida
- Superfamily: Scissurelloidea
- Family: Scissurellidae
- Genus: Satondella
- Species: S. danieli

Binomial name
- Satondella danieli Segers, Swinnen & Abreu, 2009

Species of gastropod

Satondella danieli is a species of small sea snail, a marine gastropod mollusk or micromollusk in the family Scissurellidae, the little slit snails.

== Description ==
The shell grows to a height of 1.4 mm; it is white and partially translucent. The aperture is irregularly oval-shaped and polygonal with a short slit.

== Distribution ==
This species occurs in the Atlantic Ocean off Madeira.
