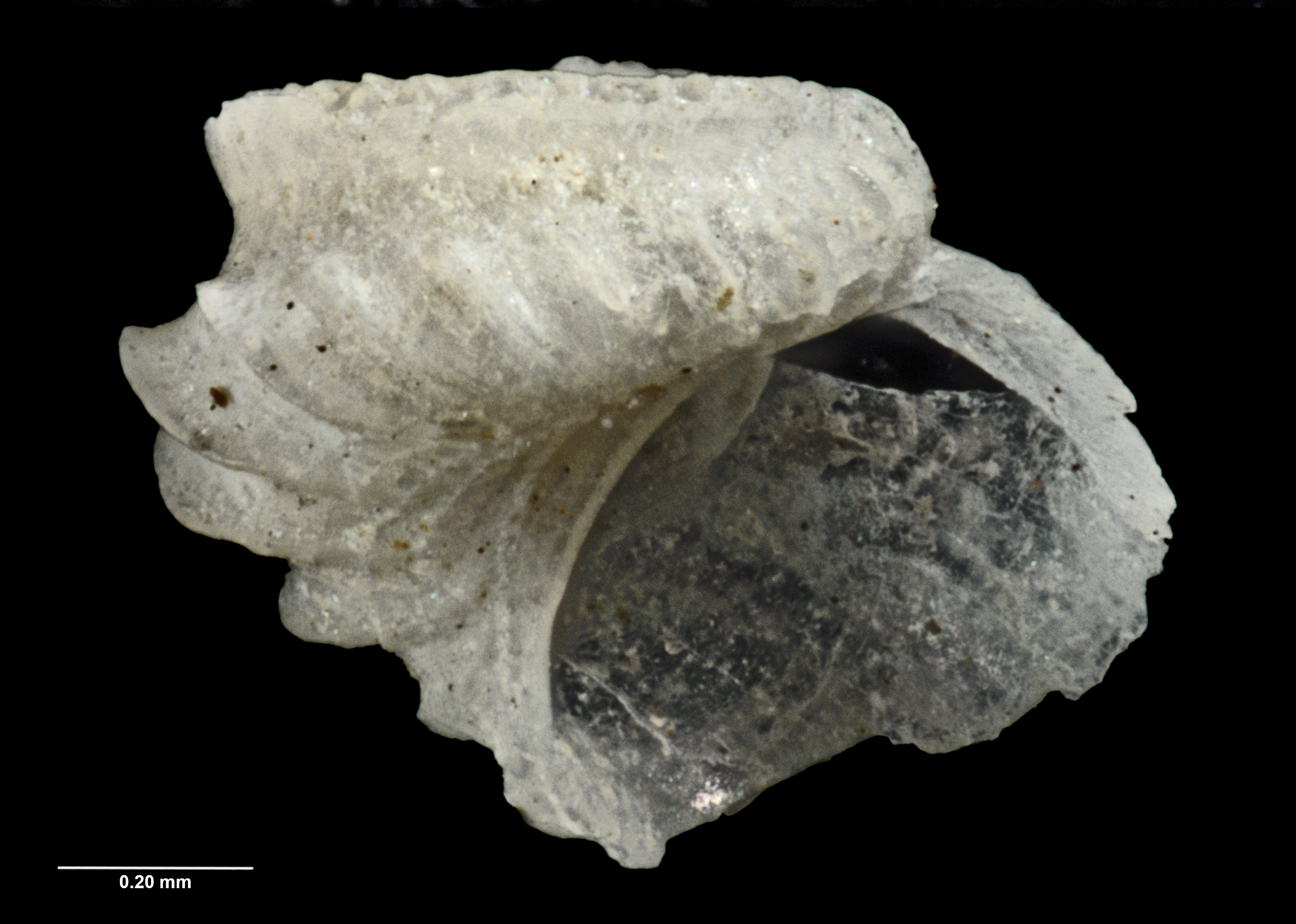
- Shell of Sinezona laqueus (specimen at the Auckland War Memorial Museum)

Scientific classification
- Kingdom: Animalia
- Phylum: Mollusca
- Class: Gastropoda
- Subclass: Vetigastropoda
- Order: Lepetellida
- Family: Scissurellidae
- Genus: Sinezona
- Species: S. laqueus

Binomial name
- Sinezona laqueus (Finlay, 1927)

Synonyms
- Schismope beddomei Suter, 1913; Schismope laqueus Finlay, 1927

= Sinezona laqueus =

Species of gastropod

Sinezona laqueus is a species of minute sea snail, a marine gastropod mollusc or micromollusc in the family Scissurellidae, the little slit shells.

== Distribution ==
This marine species occurs off New Zealand.
