= Incisura remota =

Scientific classification
- Kingdom: Animalia
- Phylum: Mollusca
- Class: Gastropoda
- Subclass: Vetigastropoda
- Order: Lepetellida
- Superfamily: Scissurelloidea
- Family: Scissurellidae
- Genus: Incisura
- Species: I. remota

Binomial name
- Incisura remota (Iredale, 1924)

Synonyms
- Incisura vincentiana (Cotton, 1945); Scissurona remota Iredale, 1924; Scissurona vincentiana Cotton, 1945

Species of gastropod

Incisura remota is a species of small sea snail, a marine gastropod mollusk or micromollusk in the family Scissurellidae, the little slit snails.
