= Sutilizona tunnicliffae =

Scientific classification
- Kingdom: Animalia
- Phylum: Mollusca
- Class: Gastropoda
- Subclass: Vetigastropoda
- Order: Lepetellida
- Family: Sutilizonidae
- Genus: Sutilizona
- Species: S. tunnicliffae

Binomial name
- Sutilizona tunnicliffae Warén & Bouchet, 2001

Species of gastropod

Sutilizona tunnicliffae is a species of sea snail, a marine gastropod mollusc in the family Sutilizonidae.
