= Satondella senni =

Scientific classification
- Kingdom: Animalia
- Phylum: Mollusca
- Class: Gastropoda
- Subclass: Vetigastropoda
- Order: Lepetellida
- Family: Scissurellidae
- Genus: Satondella
- Species: S. senni

Binomial name
- Satondella senni Geiger, 2003

Species of gastropod

Satondella senni is a species of sea snail, a marine gastropod mollusc in the family Scissurellidae.

== Distribution ==
This species occurs in the Pacific Ocean off Easter Island.
