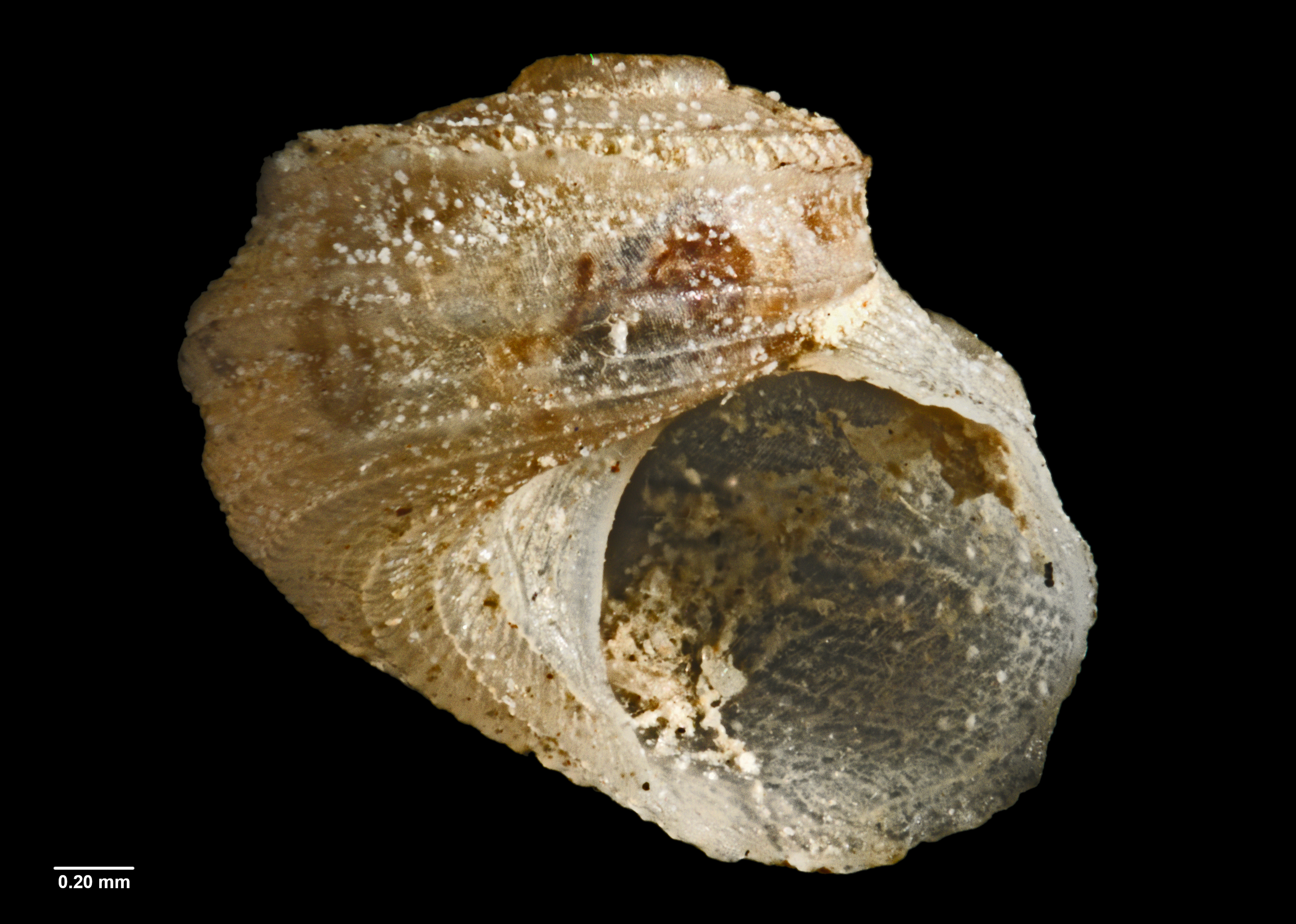
- Shell of Sukashitrochus lyallensis (specimen at the Auckland War Memorial Museum)

Scientific classification
- Kingdom: Animalia
- Phylum: Mollusca
- Class: Gastropoda
- Subclass: Vetigastropoda
- Order: Lepetellida
- Family: Scissurellidae
- Genus: Sukashitrochus
- Species: S. lyallensis

Binomial name
- Sukashitrochus lyallensis (Finlay, 1927)

Synonyms
- Schismope atkinsoni Suter, 1913; Schismope lyallensis Finlay, 1927; Sinezona lyallensis (Finlay, 1927)

= Sukashitrochus lyallensis =

Species of gastropod

Sukashitrochus lyallensis is a species of small sea snail, a marine gastropod mollusc in the family Scissurellidae.

== Habitat ==
Sukashitrochus lyallensis is generally found in New Zealand. It is found in water up to a depth of 240 m.

== Shell description ==
At 1.5 mm in height and 1.8 mm in width, its shell is larger than Sinezona iota and Sinezona laques.
