= Sinezona plicata =

Scientific classification
- Kingdom: Animalia
- Phylum: Mollusca
- Class: Gastropoda
- Subclass: Vetigastropoda
- Order: Lepetellida
- Superfamily: Scissurelloidea
- Family: Scissurellidae
- Genus: Sinezona
- Species: S. plicata

Binomial name
- Sinezona plicata (Hedley, 1899)

Synonyms
- Schismope plicata Hedley, 1899; Woodwardia provecta Beets, 1943

Species of gastropod

Sinezona plicata is a species of small sea snail, a marine gastropod mollusk or micromollusk in the family Scissurellidae, the little slit snails.

== Description ==
The shell attains a height of 2 mm.

== Distribution ==
This marine species occurs off the Philippines and Australia.
