= Satondella minuta =

Scientific classification
- Kingdom: Animalia
- Phylum: Mollusca
- Class: Gastropoda
- Subclass: Vetigastropoda
- Order: Lepetellida
- Family: Scissurellidae
- Genus: Satondella
- Species: S. minuta

Binomial name
- Satondella minuta Bandel, 1998

Species of gastropod

Satondella minuta is a species of sea snail, a marine gastropod mollusc in the family Scissurellidae.
