= Sinezona enigmatica =

Scientific classification
- Kingdom: Animalia
- Phylum: Mollusca
- Class: Gastropoda
- Subclass: Vetigastropoda
- Order: Lepetellida
- Superfamily: Scissurelloidea
- Family: Scissurellidae
- Genus: Sinezona
- Species: S. enigmatica

Binomial name
- Sinezona enigmatica Geiger & B.A. Marshall, 2012

Species of gastropod

Sinezona enigmatica is a species of small sea snail, a marine gastropod mollusc or micromollusc in the family Scissurellidae, the little slit snails.

== Distribution ==
This marine species occurs off New Zealand.
