= Sukashitrochus carinatus =

Scientific classification
- Kingdom: Animalia
- Phylum: Mollusca
- Class: Gastropoda
- Subclass: Vetigastropoda
- Order: Lepetellida
- Superfamily: Scissurelloidea
- Family: Scissurellidae
- Genus: Sukashitrochus
- Species: S. carinatus

Binomial name
- Sukashitrochus carinatus (A. Adams, 1862)

Synonyms
- Scissurella carinata A. Adams, 1862; Sinezona carinata (Adams, A., 1862)

Species of gastropod

Sukashitrochus carinatus is a species of small sea snail, a marine gastropod mollusk or micromollusk in the family Scissurellidae, the little slit snails.

== Description ==
The shell attains a height of 2 mm. The shell has an ovate, depressed shape. The spire is nearly plane. The 2½ whorls are plane. The body whorl is radiately striate above the carina (more strongly at the sutures). It is ornamented below the carina with elevated, transverse cinguli. The base has elevated concentric lines with its interstices cancellated. The aperture is oblique. The inner lip recedes.

This species has a foramen instead of a fissure. It is characterized by a flattened spire and three prominent keels on the last whorl below the carinate periphery. It most nearly resembles Sukashitrochus dorbignyi (Audouin, 1826) but there are three keels besides the fissural carina.

== Distribution ==
This marine species occurs off Japan.
