= Sutilizona theca =

Scientific classification
- Kingdom: Animalia
- Phylum: Mollusca
- Class: Gastropoda
- Subclass: Vetigastropoda
- Order: Lepetellida
- Family: Sutilizonidae
- Genus: Sutilizona
- Species: S. theca

Binomial name
- Sutilizona theca McLean, 1989

Species of gastropod

Sutilizona theca is a species of sea snail, a marine gastropod mollusc in the family Sutilizonidae.

== Distribution ==
This marine species occurs in hydrothermal vents.
