= Sinezona beddomei =

Scientific classification
- Kingdom: Animalia
- Phylum: Mollusca
- Class: Gastropoda
- Subclass: Vetigastropoda
- Order: Lepetellida
- Superfamily: Scissurelloidea
- Family: Scissurellidae
- Genus: Sinezona
- Species: S. beddomei

Binomial name
- Sinezona beddomei (Petterd, 1884)

Synonyms
- Schismope beddomei Petterd, 1884

Species of gastropod

Sinezona beddomei is a species of small sea snail, a marine gastropod mollusk or micromollusk in the family Scissurellidae, the little slit snails.

== Description ==
The shell reaches a height of 0.8 mm. The small shell is turbinately depressed and umbilicate. It is sordidly white, dull, and thin. The spire is low and tabulated. The 3½ whorls are apical flat. The whorls are very rapidly increasing in size. The spiral sculpture is formed by a strong keel of the raised edges of the canal scar. Above and below this keel the body whorl is distinctly concave and smooth. The sinus is conspicuous with raised margin. The shell is longitudinally plicate, with the plicae more prominent at the base. There are a few short radiate riblets spreading from the suture on the upper side. The base of the shell has about 12 distant, sharp and strong, oblique riblets. The oblique aperture is ovate and of moderate size. The outer lip is sharp, and broadly convex. The inner lip spreads a short distance over the body, and forms a sharp angle with the outer lip. The columella is concave truncated below and slightly callous. The umbilicus is rather large and deep. The anal perforation has raised margins. it is moderately long, rounded behind, pointed in front, with a very distinct callosity on the inner side.

== Distribution ==
This marine species occurs off New South Wales to Western Australia, and off New Zealand.
