= Trochotoma =

Scientific classification
- Kingdom: Animalia
- Phylum: Mollusca
- Class: Gastropoda
- Subclass: Vetigastropoda
- Order: Pleurotomariida
- Superfamily: Pleurotomarioidea
- Family: Pleurotomariidae
- Genus: Trochotoma; Eudes-Deslongchamps, 1842

Genus of gastropods

Trochotoma is a genus of large sea snails, marine gastropod mollusks in the family Pleurotomariidae, the slit snails.

== Species ==
The following species were brought into synonymy:

- Trochotoma crossei de Folin, 1869: synonym of Sinezona cingulata (O. G. Costa, 1861)
