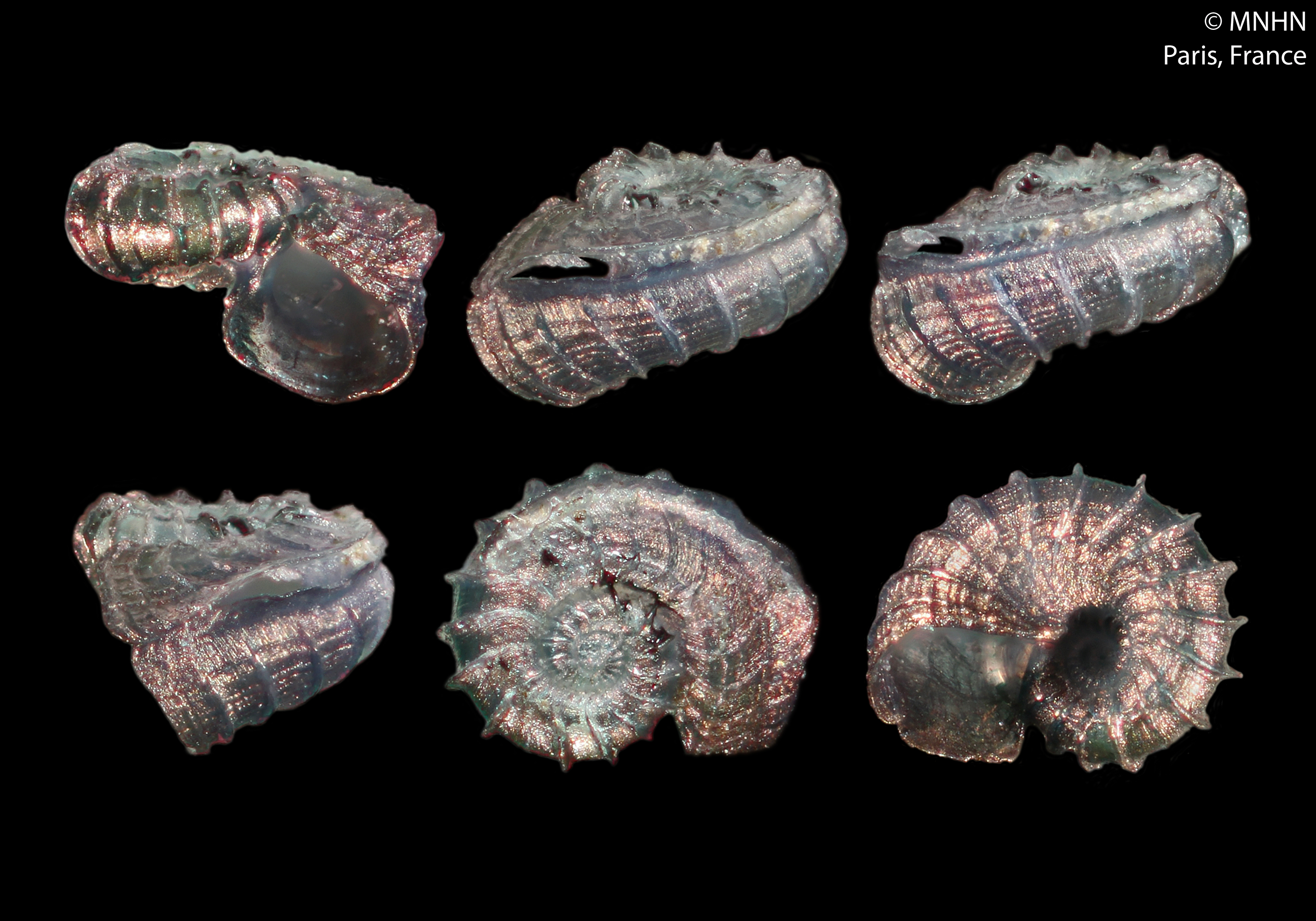
- Shell of Satondella dantarti (holotype at MNHN, Paris)

Scientific classification
- Kingdom: Animalia
- Phylum: Mollusca
- Class: Gastropoda
- Subclass: Vetigastropoda
- Order: Lepetellida
- Superfamily: Scissurelloidea
- Family: Scissurellidae
- Genus: Satondella
- Species: S. dantarti

Binomial name
- Satondella dantarti Luque, Geiger & Rolán, 2011

= Satondella dantarti =

Species of gastropod

Satondella dantarti is a species of small sea snail, a marine gastropod mollusk or micromollusk in the family Scissurellidae, the little slit snails.

== Distribution ==
This marine species occurs off New Caledonia.
