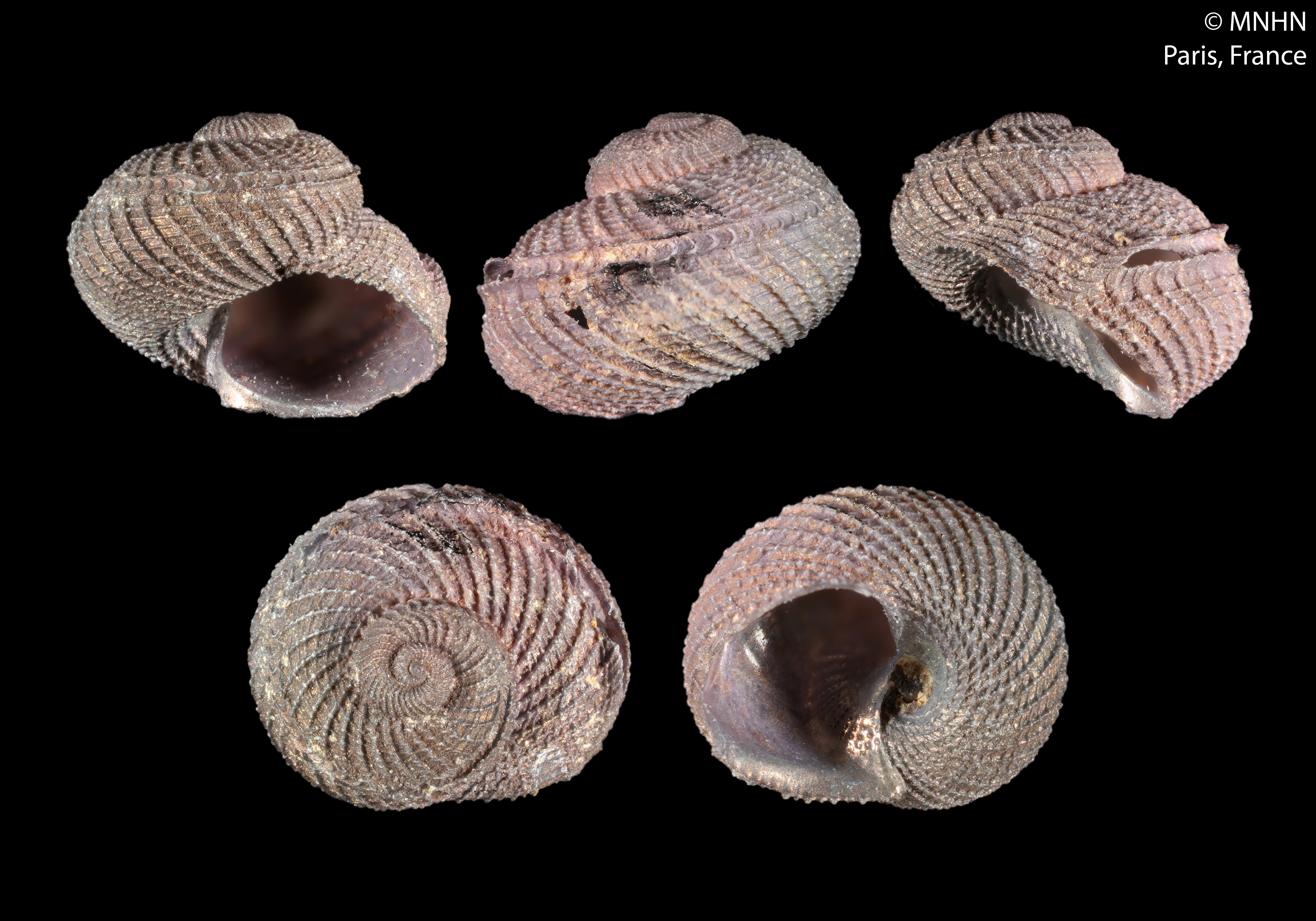
- Shell of Sinezona globosa (holotype at MNHN, Paris)

Scientific classification
- Kingdom: Animalia
- Phylum: Mollusca
- Class: Gastropoda
- Subclass: Vetigastropoda
- Order: Lepetellida
- Superfamily: Scissurelloidea
- Family: Scissurellidae
- Genus: Sinezona
- Species: S. globosa

Binomial name
- Sinezona globosa Geiger, 2006

= Sinezona globosa =

Species of gastropod

Sinezona globosa is a species of small sea snail, a marine gastropod mollusk or micromollusk in the family Scissurellidae, the little slit shells.

== Description ==
The length of the shell attains 3.1 mm.

== Distribution ==
This marine species occurs off New Caledonia.
