= Coronadoa hasegawai =

Scientific classification
- Kingdom: Animalia
- Phylum: Mollusca
- Class: Gastropoda
- Subclass: Vetigastropoda
- Order: Lepetellida
- Family: Scissurellidae
- Genus: Coronadoa
- Species: C. hasegawai

Binomial name
- Coronadoa hasegawai Geiger & Sasaki, 2009

Species of gastropod

Coronadoa hasegawai is a species of sea snail, a marine gastropod mollusc in the family Scissurellidae, the top snails.

== Distribution ==
This marine species occurs off Japan.
