= Sinezona levigata =

Scientific classification
- Kingdom: Animalia
- Phylum: Mollusca
- Class: Gastropoda
- Subclass: Vetigastropoda
- Order: Lepetellida
- Family: Scissurellidae
- Genus: Sinezona
- Species: S. levigata

Binomial name
- Sinezona levigata (Iredale, 1927)

Synonyms
- Ariella campbelli Bandel, 1998; Schismope brevis levigata (Iredale, 1927); Sinezona laevigata Finlay, 1927

Species of gastropod

Sinezona levigata is a species of small sea snail, a marine gastropod mollusc or micromollusc in the family Scissurellidae, the little slit shells.

== Description ==
This species differs from Sinezona brevis in the degree of sculpture. At first sight it would appear a very different shell, but when closely examining the sculpture, it is seen to be the same. The longitudinal ribs have greatly deteriorated in strength, whilst the spirals have gained. The body whorl descends much more rapidly than in Sinezona brevis, whilst the earlier whorls are smaller. This combination gives an entirely different appearance to the shell, which is further strengthened by the fact that the fasciole is very little longer than the foramen. The thin operculum is horny and multispiral. The colour of the shell is cream. Dead shells are pure white.

== Distribution ==
This marine species occurs off New Zealand.
