= Sinezona rimuloides =

Scientific classification
- Kingdom: Animalia
- Phylum: Mollusca
- Class: Gastropoda
- Subclass: Vetigastropoda
- Order: Lepetellida
- Superfamily: Scissurelloidea
- Family: Scissurellidae
- Genus: Sinezona
- Species: S. rimuloides

Binomial name
- Sinezona rimuloides (Carpenter, 1865)

Synonyms
- Scissurella rimuloides Carpenter, 1865

Species of gastropod

Sinezona rimuloides is a species of minute sea snail, a marine gastropod mollusk or micromollusk in the family Scissurellidae, the little slit snails.

== Description ==
The shell attains a height of 0.8 mm. (Original description by Carpenter) This beautiful little species is the first known from America. It looks like a Velutina crossed by sharp ribs in the direction of the slanting mouth. In the first whorl the ribs are very close. It then assumes its normal sculpture, but there is nearly a whorl before there is any trace of incision. This appears to have begun as a slit, which was afterwards closed up. A band, marked off by ten transverse ribs showing stages of growth, encircles the shell as far as the hole, which is long and somewhat rectangular; but there is no band between the hole and the outer lip.

== Distribution ==
This species occurs in the Pacific Ocean from California, USA to Chile; off the Galápagos Islands.
