= Sinezona wileyi =

Scientific classification
- Kingdom: Animalia
- Phylum: Mollusca
- Class: Gastropoda
- Subclass: Vetigastropoda
- Order: Lepetellida
- Family: Scissurellidae
- Genus: Sinezona
- Species: S. wileyi

Binomial name
- Sinezona wileyi Geiger, 2008

Species of gastropod

Sinezona wileyi is a species of small sea snail, a marine gastropod mollusk or micromollusk in the family Scissurellidae, the little slit shells.

== Distribution ==
This species occurs in the Pacific Ocean off French Polynesia.
