= Sinezona confusa =

Scientific classification
- Kingdom: Animalia
- Phylum: Mollusca
- Class: Gastropoda
- Subclass: Vetigastropoda
- Order: Lepetellida
- Family: Scissurellidae
- Genus: Sinezona
- Species: S. confusa

Binomial name
- Sinezona confusa Rolán & Luque, 1994

Synonyms
- Schismope cingulata auct. non O. G. Costa, 1861; Schismope columbiana Bandel, 1998; Scissurella columbiana (Bandel, 1998); Sinezona hawaiiensis Geiger, D.L. & J.H. McLean, 2010; Woodwardia cingulata auct. non O. G. Costa, 1861

Species of mollusc

Sinezona confusa commonly known as the Caribbean sinezone is a species of minutes sea snail, a marine gastropod mollusk or micromollusk in the family Scissurellidae.

== Description ==
The shell reaches a height of 1.5 mm.

It was formally described by the malacologists Emilio Rolán and Ángel A. Luque in 1994. It was published in the journal Iberus. Previous specimens were thought to be Sinezona crossei (Folin, 1869).

== Distribution ==
This species occurs in the Gulf of Mexico, the Caribbean Sea and in the Atlantic Ocean off Brazil.

The species is benthic and has been recorded at depths of 0 to 60 m. It has been reported to occur on submergent vegetation.
