= Sinezona insularis =

Scientific classification
- Kingdom: Animalia
- Phylum: Mollusca
- Class: Gastropoda
- Subclass: Vetigastropoda
- Order: Lepetellida
- Family: Scissurellidae
- Genus: Sinezona
- Species: S. insularis

Binomial name
- Sinezona insularis Simone, 2009

Species of gastropod

Sinezona insularis is a species of small sea snail, a marine gastropod mollusk or micromollusk in the family Scissurellidae, the little slit shells.
