= Sinezona bandeli =

Scientific classification
- Kingdom: Animalia
- Phylum: Mollusca
- Class: Gastropoda
- Subclass: Vetigastropoda
- Order: Lepetellida
- Family: Scissurellidae
- Genus: Sinezona
- Species: S. bandeli

Binomial name
- Sinezona bandeli Marshall, 2002

Species of gastropod

Sinezona bandeli is a species of small sea snail, a marine gastropod mollusk in the family Scissurellidae.

== Distribution ==
This marine species occurs off New Zealand
