= Sinezona finlayi =

Scientific classification
- Kingdom: Animalia
- Phylum: Mollusca
- Class: Gastropoda
- Subclass: Vetigastropoda
- Order: Lepetellida
- Superfamily: Scissurelloidea
- Family: Scissurellidae
- Genus: Sinezona
- Species: S. finlayi

Binomial name
- Sinezona finlayi (Laws, 1948)

Synonyms
- Schismope finlayi Laws, 1948

Species of sea snail

Sinezona finlayi is a species of small sea snail, a marine gastropod mollusk or micromollusk in the family Scissurellidae, the little slit snails.
