= Depressizona exorum =

Scientific classification
- Kingdom: Animalia
- Phylum: Mollusca
- Class: Gastropoda
- Subclass: Vetigastropoda
- Order: Lepetellida
- Family: Depressizonidae
- Genus: Depressizona
- Species: D. exorum

Binomial name
- Depressizona exorum Geiger, 2003

Species of gastropod

Depressizona exorum is a species of sea snail, a marine gastropod mollusk in the family Depressizonidae.

It has also been placed in Scissurellidae.

== Distribution ==
This species occurs in the Pacific Ocean off Easter Island.
