= Sinezona semicostata =

Scientific classification
- Kingdom: Animalia
- Phylum: Mollusca
- Class: Gastropoda
- Subclass: Vetigastropoda
- Order: Lepetellida
- Family: Scissurellidae
- Genus: Sinezona
- Species: S. semicostata

Binomial name
- Sinezona semicostata Burnay & Rolán, 1990

Species of gastropod

Sinezona semicostata is a species of small sea snail, a marine gastropod mollusk or micromollusk in the family Scissurellidae, the little slit shells.

== Description ==
The size of the shell varies between 0.5 mm and 0.7 mm.

== Distribution ==
This species occurs in the Atlantic Ocean off the Canary Islands, Madeira and Cape Verde and in the Mediterranean Sea off Italy.
