= Coronadoa demisispira =

Scientific classification
- Kingdom: Animalia
- Phylum: Mollusca
- Class: Gastropoda
- Subclass: Vetigastropoda
- Order: Lepetellida
- Superfamily: Scissurelloidea
- Family: Scissurellidae
- Genus: Coronadoa
- Species: C. demisispira

Binomial name
- Coronadoa demisispira Geiger & McLean, 2010

Species of gastropod

Coronadoa demisispira is a species of small sea snail, a marine gastropod mollusc or micromollusc in the family Scissurellidae, the little slit snails.

== Distribution ==
This species occurs in the Pacific Ocean off Santa Catalina Island, California, USA
