= Ariella haliotimorpha =

Scientific classification
- Kingdom: Animalia
- Phylum: Mollusca
- Class: Gastropoda
- Subclass: Vetigastropoda
- Order: Lepetellida
- Superfamily: Scissurelloidea
- Family: Scissurellidae
- Genus: Ariella
- Species: A. haliotimorpha

Binomial name
- Ariella haliotimorpha Bandel, 1998

Species of gastropod

Ariella haliotimorpha is a species of small sea snail, a marine gastropod mollusk or micromollusk in the family Scissurellidae, the little slit snails.
