= Satondella cachoi =

Scientific classification
- Kingdom: Animalia
- Phylum: Mollusca
- Class: Gastropoda
- Subclass: Vetigastropoda
- Order: Lepetellida
- Superfamily: Scissurelloidea
- Family: Scissurellidae
- Genus: Satondella
- Species: S. cachoi

Binomial name
- Satondella cachoi Luque, Geiger & Rolán, 2011

Species of gastropod

Satondella cachoi is a species of small sea snail, a marine gastropod mollusk or micromollusk in the family Scissurellidae, the little slit snails.
