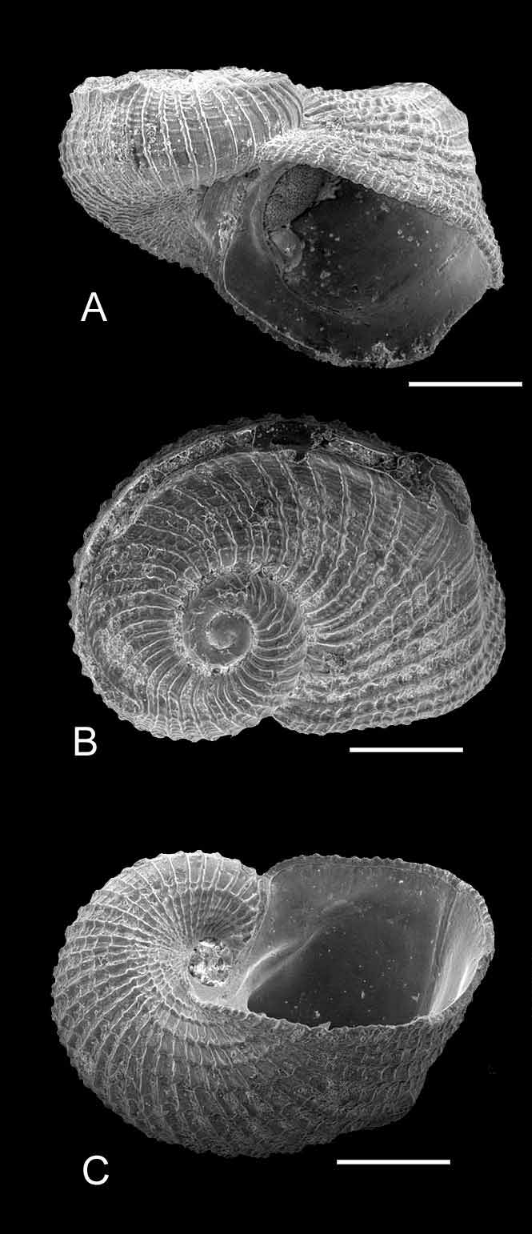

Scientific classification
- Kingdom: Animalia
- Phylum: Mollusca
- Class: Gastropoda
- Subclass: Vetigastropoda
- Order: Lepetellida
- Superfamily: Scissurelloidea
- Family: Scissurellidae
- Genus: Satondella
- Species: S. tabulata

Binomial name
- Satondella tabulata (Watson, 1886)

Synonyms
- Schismope tabulata Watson, 1886; Sinezona tabulata (Watson, 1886)

= Satondella tabulata =

Species of gastropod

Satondella tabulata is a species of small sea snail, a marine gastropod mollusk or micromollusk in the family Scissurellidae, little slit snails.

== Description ==
The height of the shell reaches 2.1 mm.

== Distribution ==
This marine species occurs off the Bahamas, Puerto Rico, Gulf of Mexico and New Caledonia.
