= Sinezona macleani =

Scientific classification
- Kingdom: Animalia
- Phylum: Mollusca
- Class: Gastropoda
- Subclass: Vetigastropoda
- Order: Lepetellida
- Family: Scissurellidae
- Genus: Sinezona
- Species: S. macleani

Binomial name
- Sinezona macleani Geiger, 2006

Species of gastropod

Sinezona macleani is a minute species of sea snail, a marine gastropod mollusk or micromollusk in the family Scissurellidae, the little slit shells.
