= Sinezona brucei =

Scientific classification
- Kingdom: Animalia
- Phylum: Mollusca
- Class: Gastropoda
- Subclass: Vetigastropoda
- Order: Lepetellida
- Superfamily: Scissurelloidea
- Family: Scissurellidae
- Genus: Sinezona
- Species: S. brucei

Binomial name
- Sinezona brucei Geiger, 2012

Species of gastropod

Sinezona brucei is a species of small sea snail, a marine gastropod mollusc or micromollusc in the family Scissurellidae, the little slit snails.
