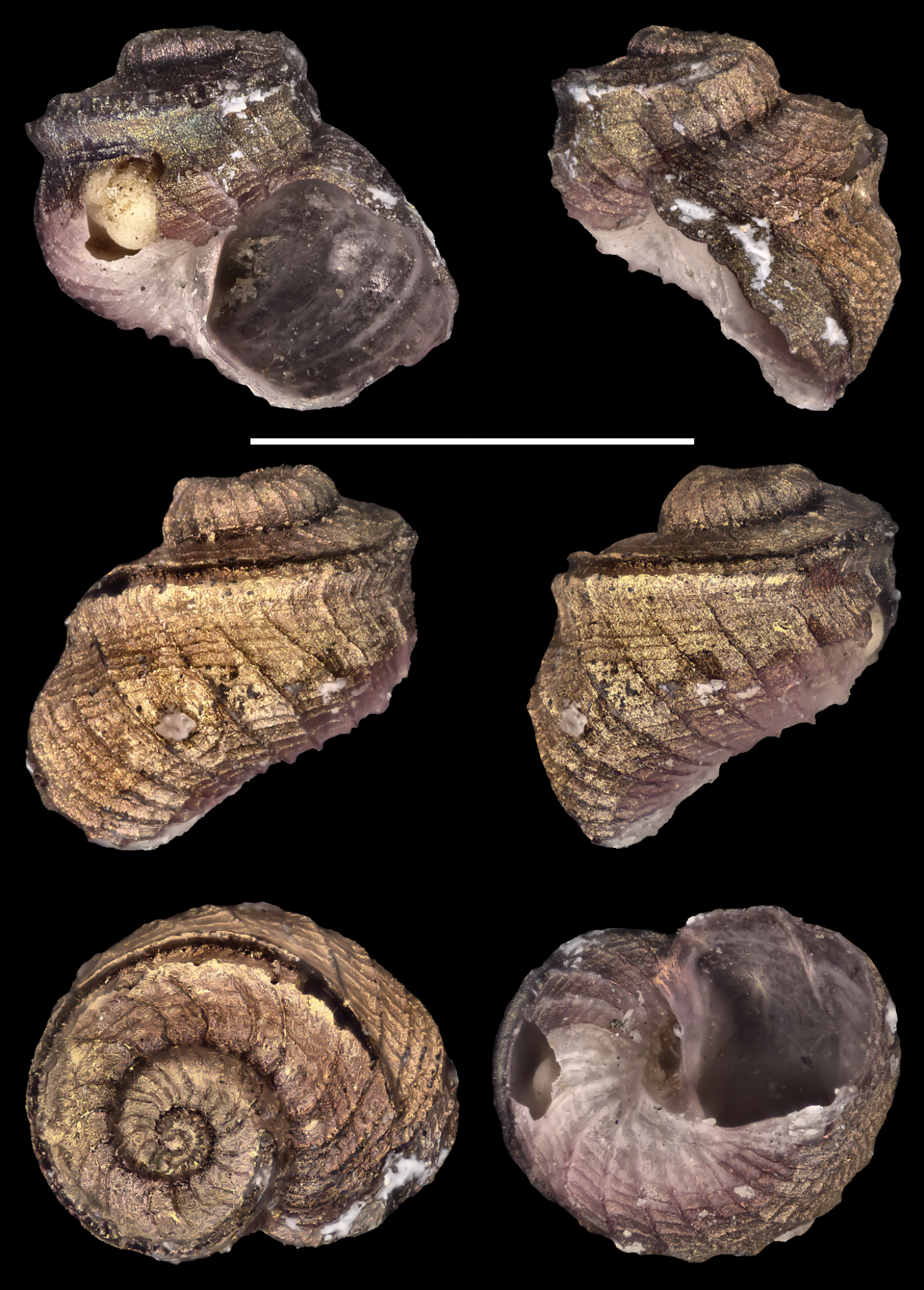
- Shell of Sinezona doliolum (specimen at the KwaZulu-Natal Museum)

Scientific classification
- Kingdom: Animalia
- Phylum: Mollusca
- Class: Gastropoda
- Subclass: Vetigastropoda
- Order: Lepetellida
- Superfamily: Scissurelloidea
- Family: Scissurellidae
- Genus: Sinezona
- Species: S. doliolum

Binomial name
- Sinezona doliolum Herbert, 1986

= Sinezona doliolum =

Species of gastropod

Sinezona doliolum is a species of small sea snail, a marine gastropod mollusk or micromollusk in the family Scissurellidae, the little slit snails.

== Description ==
The height of the shell reaches 1 mm.

== Distribution ==
This marine species occurs off Transkei, South Africa.
