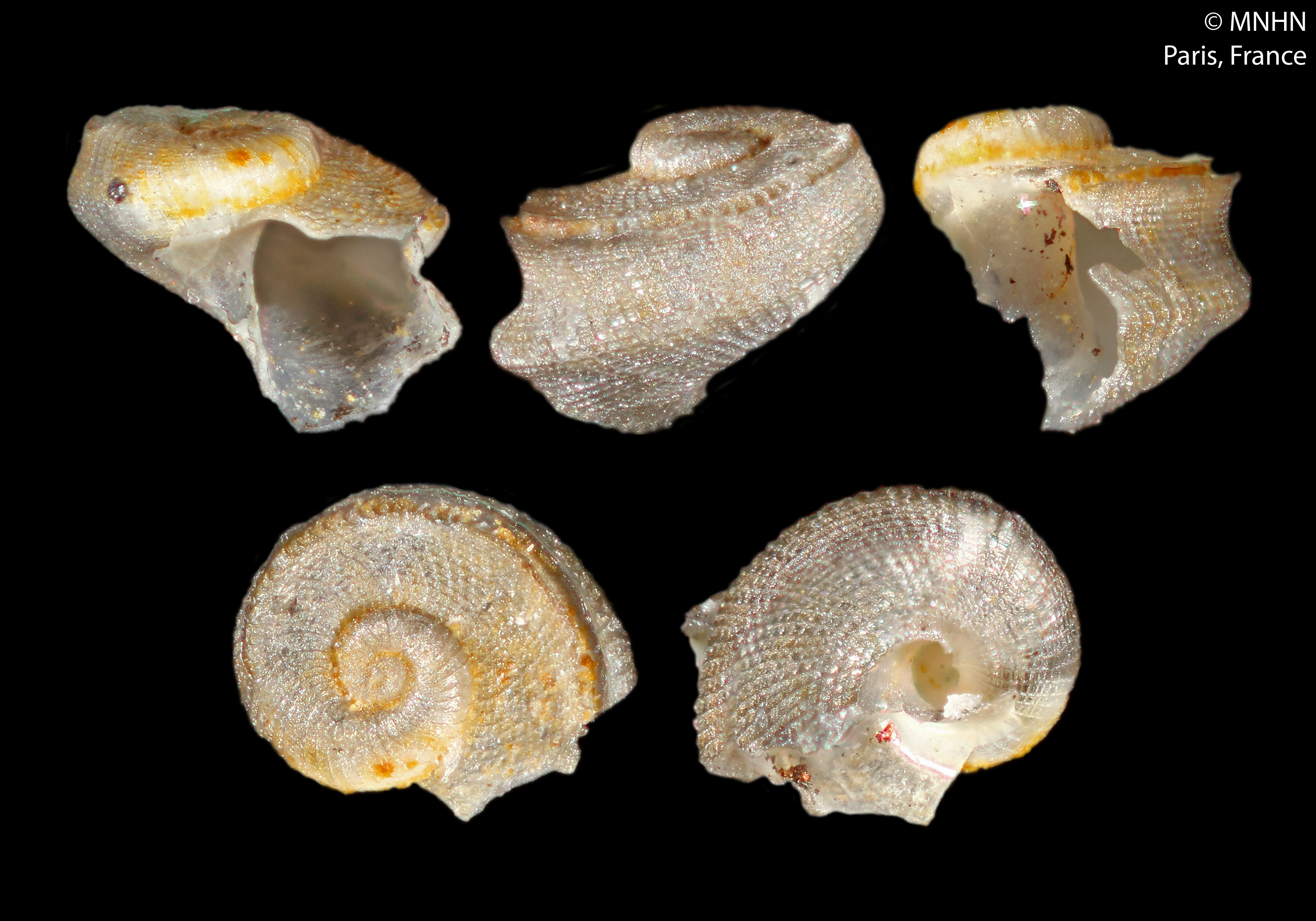
- Shell of Sukashitrochus estotiensis (holotype at MNHN, Paris)

Scientific classification
- Kingdom: Animalia
- Phylum: Mollusca
- Class: Gastropoda
- Subclass: Vetigastropoda
- Order: Lepetellida
- Superfamily: Scissurelloidea
- Family: Scissurellidae
- Genus: Sukashitrochus
- Species: S. estotiensis

Binomial name
- Sukashitrochus estotiensis Lozouet, 1999

= Sukashitrochus estotiensis =

Species of gastropod

Sukashitrochus estotiensis is an extinct species of minute sea snail, a marine gastropod mollusk or micromollusk in the family Scissurellidae, the little slit snails.

== Description ==
The length of the shell attains 0.74 mm.

== Distribution ==
This species was found in the Landes, France.
