= Sinezona subantarctica =

Scientific classification
- Kingdom: Animalia
- Phylum: Mollusca
- Class: Gastropoda
- Subclass: Vetigastropoda
- Order: Lepetellida
- Family: Scissurellidae
- Genus: Sinezona
- Species: S. subantarctica

Binomial name
- Sinezona subantarctica (Hedley, 1916)

Synonyms
- Ariella subantarctica (Hedley, 1916); Schismope subantarctica Hedley, 1916

Species of gastropod

Sinezona subantarctica is a species of minute sea snail, a marine gastropod mollusc or micromollusk in the family Scissurellidae, the little slit shells.

== Distribution ==
This species is endemic to Australia's Macquarie Islands, south of New Zealand.
