= Sinezona pauperata =

Scientific classification
- Kingdom: Animalia
- Phylum: Mollusca
- Class: Gastropoda
- Subclass: Vetigastropoda
- Order: Lepetellida
- Family: Scissurellidae
- Genus: Sinezona
- Species: S. pauperata

Binomial name
- Sinezona pauperata Powell, 1933

Synonyms
- Ariella pauperata (Powell, 1933)

Species of gastropod

Sinezona pauperata is a species of minute sea snail, a marine gastropod mollusc or micromollusk in the family Scissurellidae, the little slit shells.

== Distribution ==
This marine species occurs off New Zealand.
