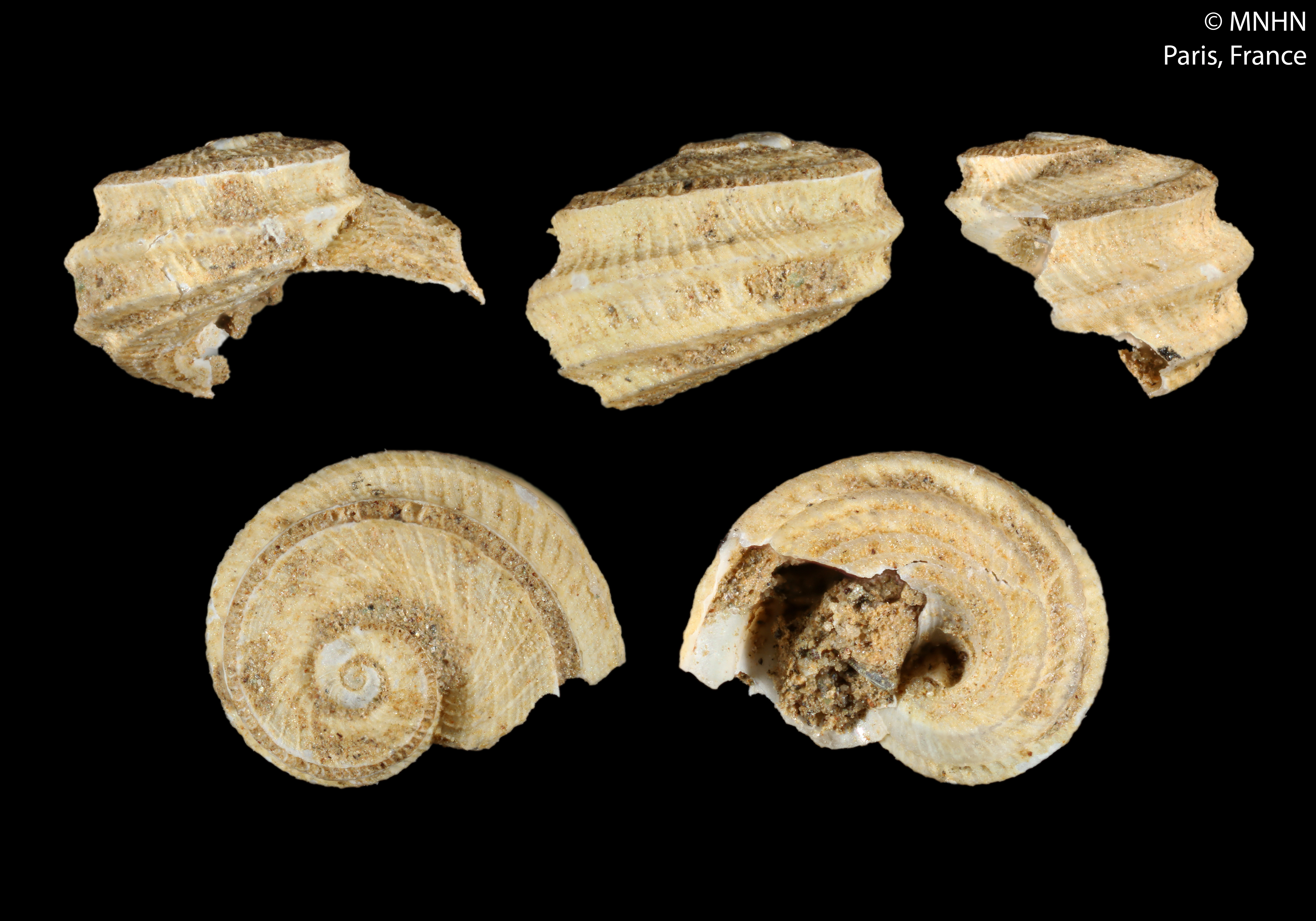
- Shell of Sukashitrochus morleti (lectotype at MNHN, Paris)

Scientific classification
- Kingdom: Animalia
- Phylum: Mollusca
- Class: Gastropoda
- Subclass: Vetigastropoda
- Order: Lepetellida
- Family: Scissurellidae
- Genus: Sukashitrochus
- Species: S. morleti

Binomial name
- Sukashitrochus morleti (Crosse, 1880)

Synonyms
- Schismope morleti Crosse, 1880; Sinezona morleti (Crosse, 1880); Sukashitrochus indonesicus Bandel, 1998; Sukashitrochus simplex Bandel, 1998

= Sukashitrochus morleti =

Species of gastropod

Sukashitrochus morleti is a species of small sea snail, a marine gastropod mollusc in the family Scissurellidae.

== Description ==
The shell is broadly and profoundly umbilicated. It has a turbinate-depressed shape. It is transversely strongly cristate-carinate, longitudinally subobliquely striate, except on the carina. The shell is thin, rather translucent, unicolored in dull whitish. The spire is very short and depressed. The apex is planate. The suture is linear. The 3½ subplane whorls increase rapidly. The large body whorl is descending. It is turbinated, quadricarinate, and constricted between the carinae. The first, second and third carinae come out strong and prominent. The interstices are concave, and subobliquely striated. The fourth carina is much smaller, and basal. The fissure is situated in the first carina a short distance from the lip. It is oblong, scarcely attaining the edge of the lip. The umbilicus is concentrically striate, but smooth within. The aperture is irregularly subquadrate-ovate. The peristome is simple, its margins joined by a very thin callus. The thin columellar margin is filiform, and subarcuate. The basal and outer margins are subacute.

== Distribution ==
This species occurs in the Pacific Ocean off New Caledonia.
