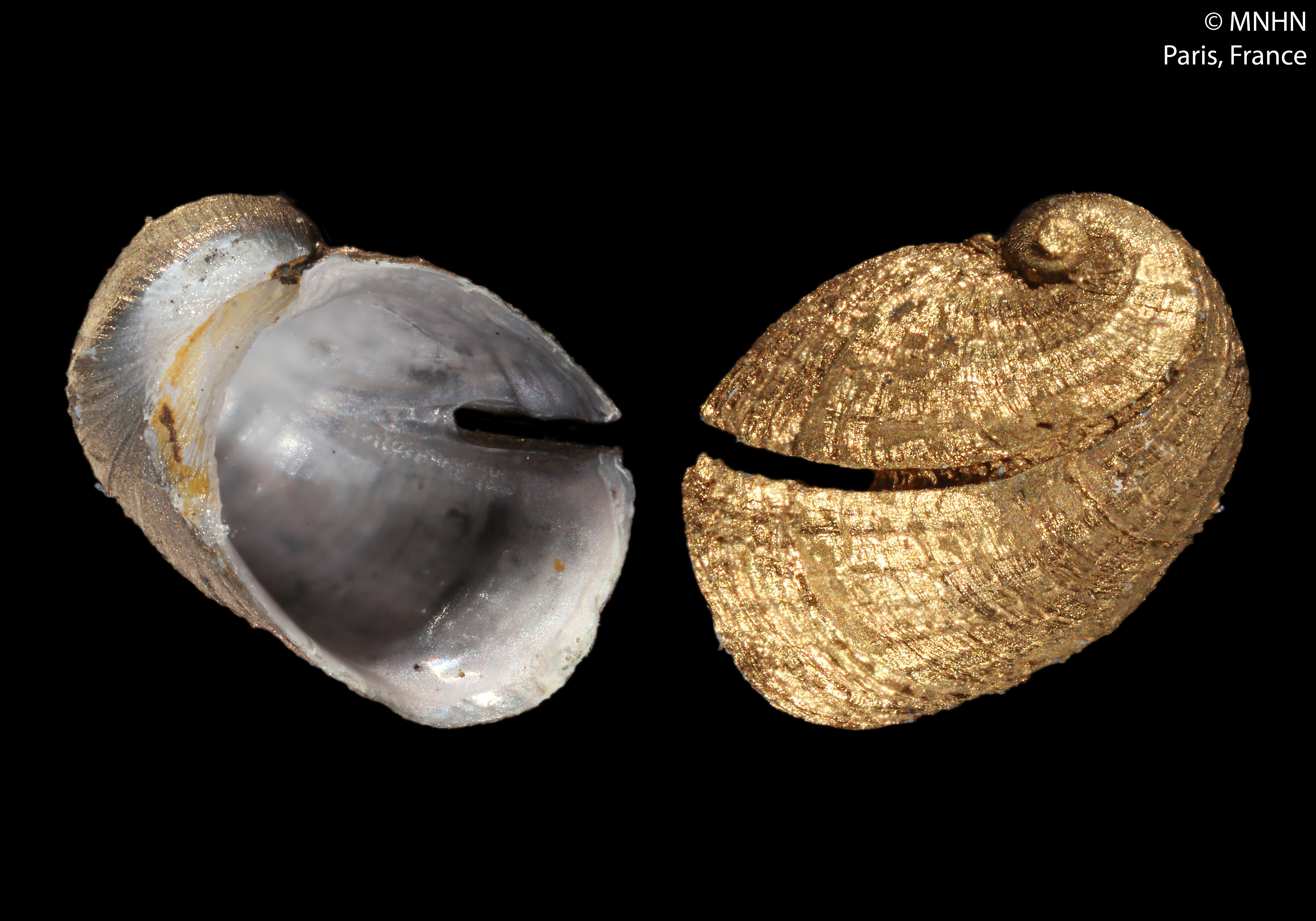
- Shell of Sutilizona pterodon (holotype at MNHN, Paris)

Scientific classification
- Kingdom: Animalia
- Phylum: Mollusca
- Class: Gastropoda
- Subclass: Vetigastropoda
- Order: Lepetellida
- Superfamily: Lepetodriloidea
- Family: Sutilizonidae
- Genus: Sutilizona; McLean, 1990

Type species
- Sutilizona theca McLean, 1989

= Sutilizona =

Genus of gastropods

Sutilizona is a genus of sea snails, marine gastropod molluscs in the family Sutilizonidae.

== Species ==
Species within the genus Sutilizona include:

- Sutilizona pterodon Warén & Bouchet, 2001
- Sutilizona theca McLean, 1989
- Sutilizona tunnicliffae Warén & Bouchet, 2001
