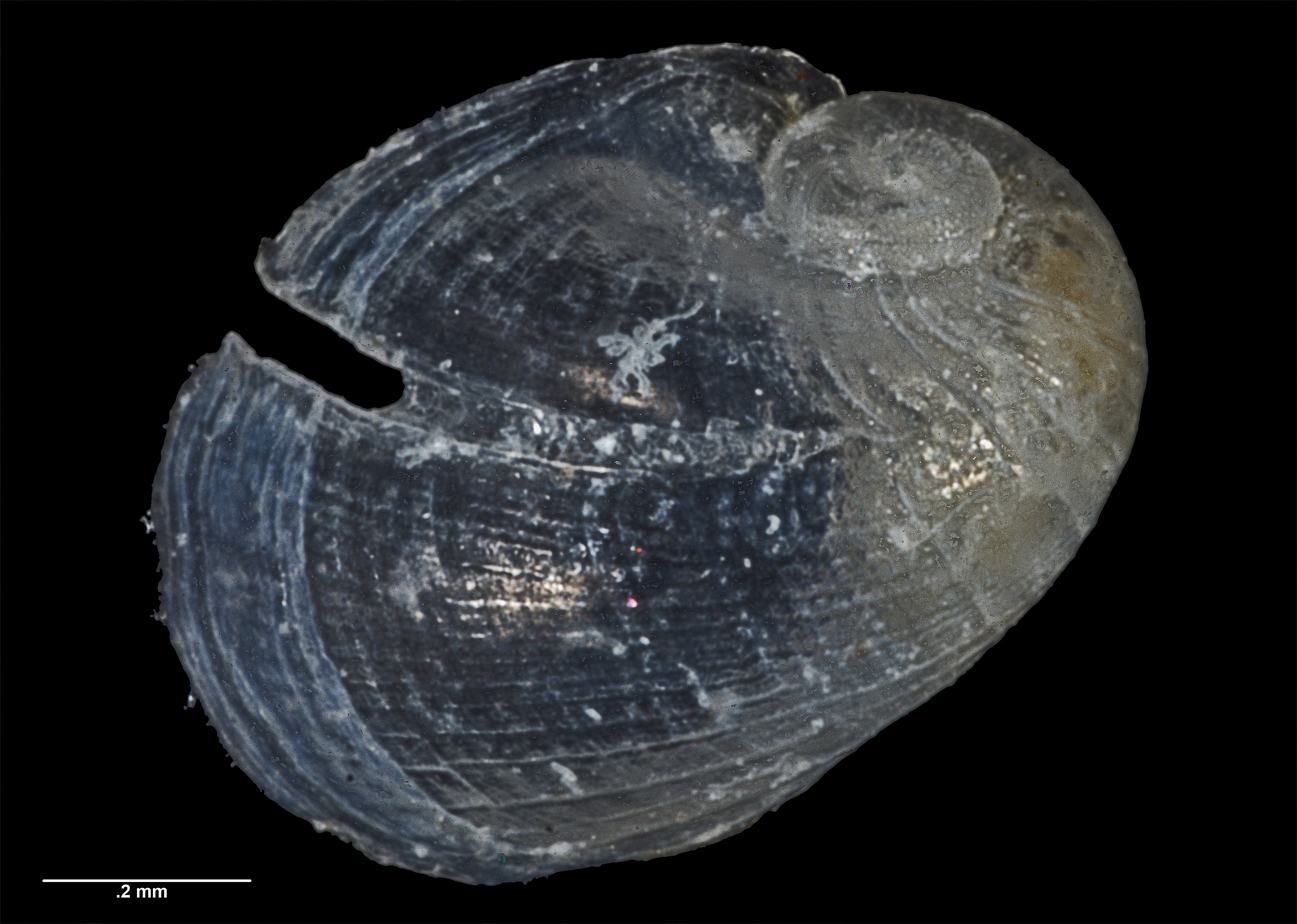

Scientific classification
- Kingdom: Animalia
- Phylum: Mollusca
- Class: Gastropoda
- Subclass: Vetigastropoda
- Order: Lepetellida
- Family: Scissurellidae
- Genus: Incisura
- Species: I. rosea

Binomial name
- Incisura rosea (Hedley, 1904)

Synonyms
- Incisura (Scissurona) rosea rosea (Hedley, 1904); Scissurona rosea (Hedley, 1904); Scissurella rosea Hedley, 1904

= Incisura rosea =

Species of gastropod

Incisura rosea, common name the rosy slit shell, is a species of small sea snail, a marine gastropod mollusc in the family Scissurellidae.

== Description ==
The shell grows to a height of 1.2 mm.

== Distribution ==
This marine species occurs off New Zealand.
