= Sukashitrochus pulcher =

Scientific classification
- Kingdom: Animalia
- Phylum: Mollusca
- Class: Gastropoda
- Subclass: Vetigastropoda
- Order: Lepetellida
- Superfamily: Scissurelloidea
- Family: Scissurellidae
- Genus: Sukashitrochus
- Species: S. pulcher

Binomial name
- Sukashitrochus pulcher (Petterd, 1884)

Synonyms
- Schismope pulchra Petterd, 1884; Sinezona pulchra Petterd, W.F., 1884

Species of gastropod

Sukashitrochus pulcher is a species of small sea snail, a marine gastropod mollusk or micromollusk in the family Scissurellidae, the little slit snails.

== Description ==
The shell grows to a height of 1.5 mm.

== Distribution ==
This marin e species occurs off Northern Queensland to Southwest Western Australia; off Japan and off Vanuatu
