= Coronadoa =

Scientific classification
- Kingdom: Animalia
- Phylum: Mollusca
- Class: Gastropoda
- Subclass: Vetigastropoda
- Order: Lepetellida
- Family: Scissurellidae
- Genus: Coronadoa; Bartsch, 1946

Type species
- Coronadoa simonsae Bartsch, 1946

Genus of gastropods

Coronadoa is a genus of sea snails, marine gastropod mollusks in the family Scissurellidae, the top snails.

== Species ==
Species within the genus Coronadoa include:

- Coronadoa demisispira Geiger & McLean, 2010
- Coronadoa hasegawai Geiger & Sasaki, 2009
- Coronadoa simonsae Bartsch, 1946
