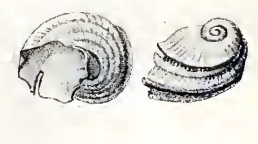
- Drawing with two views of a shell of Sukashitrochus dorbignyi

Scientific classification
- Kingdom: Animalia
- Phylum: Mollusca
- Class: Gastropoda
- Subclass: Vetigastropoda
- Order: Lepetellida
- Superfamily: Scissurelloidea
- Family: Scissurellidae
- Genus: Sukashitrochus; Habe & Kosuge, 1964

Type species
- Scissurella carinata A. Adams, 1862

= Sukashitrochus =

Genus of gastropods

Sukashitrochus is a genus of sea snails, marine gastropod molluscs in the family Scissurellidae.

== Species ==
Species within the genus Sukashitrochus include:

- Sukashitrochus atkinsoni (Tenison Woods, 1876)
- Sukashitrochus carinatus (A. Adams, 1862) - type species
- Sukashitrochus dorbignyi (Audouin, 1826)
- † Sukashitrochus estotiensis Lozouet, 1999
- † Sukashitrochus kaiparaensis (Laws, 1941)
- Sukashitrochus lyallensis (Finlay, 1926)
- Sukashitrochus morleti (Crosse, 1880) - synonyms: Sukashitrochus indonesicus Bandel, 1998; Sukashitrochus simplex Bandel, 1998
- † Sukashitrochus ngatutura (Laws, 1936)
- Sukashitrochus pulcher (Petterd, 1884)
- † Sukashitrochus saubadae Lozouet, 1998
- † Sukashitrochus terquemi (Deshayes, 1865)

Species brought into synonymy

- Sukashitrochus armillatus (Yaron, 1983): synonym of Sukashitrochus dorbignyi (Audouin, 1826)
- Sukashitrochus indonesicus Bandel, 1998: synonym of Sukashitrochus morleti (Crosse, 1880)
- Sukashitrochus maraisi Herbert, 1986: synonym of Sukashitrochus dorbignyi (Audouin, 1826)
- Sukashitrochus mirandus (A. Adams, 1862): synonym of Sinezona miranda (A. Adams, 1862) (nomen dubium)
- Sukashitrochus simplex Bandel, 1998: synonym of Sukashitrochus morleti (Crosse, 1880)
- Sukashitrochus tasmanicus (Petterd, 1879): synonym of Sukashitrochus atkinsoni (Tenison Woods, 1876)
- Sukashitrochus tricarinatus (Yaron, 1983): synonym of Sukashitrochus dorbignyi (Audouin, 1826)
