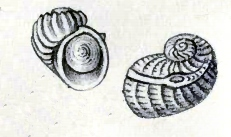
- Drawing with two views of a shell of Sinezona cingulata

Scientific classification
- Kingdom: Animalia
- Phylum: Mollusca
- Class: Gastropoda
- Subclass: Vetigastropoda
- Order: Lepetellida
- Family: Scissurellidae
- Genus: Sinezona
- Species: S. cingulata

Binomial name
- Sinezona cingulata (Costa O.G., 1861)

Synonyms
- Schismope depressa Watson, 1897; Schismope fayalensis Dautzenberg, 1889; Scissurella cingulata O. G. Costa, 1861 (original combination); Sinezona crossei (de Folin, 1869); Sinezona fayalensis (Dautzenberg, 1889); Trochotoma crossei de Folin, 1869

= Sinezona cingulata =

Species of gastropod

Sinezona cingulata is a species of small sea snail, a marine gastropod mollusk in the family Scissurellidae.

== Description ==
The size of the extremely minute shell varies between 0.6 mm and 1 mm. The white, fragile and thin shell has a globose-turbinate shape. The spire is very short and obtuse. The three whorls are very convex, and rapidly increasing. They are sculptured with distant elevated radiating lamellae. The body whorl is very large, globose, with longitudinal rather distant lamellae. The interstices are decussated by numerous very fine growth lines and spiral lirulae. The anal fasciole starts on the body whorl opposite the aperture, terminating in a long, narrow slit which does not attain the edge of the peristome. Its elevated margins are irregular and lamellar. The ovate aperture is narrower above.

== Distribution ==
This marine species has a wide distribution. It occurs off the West Indies, West Africa and in the Mediterranean Sea.
