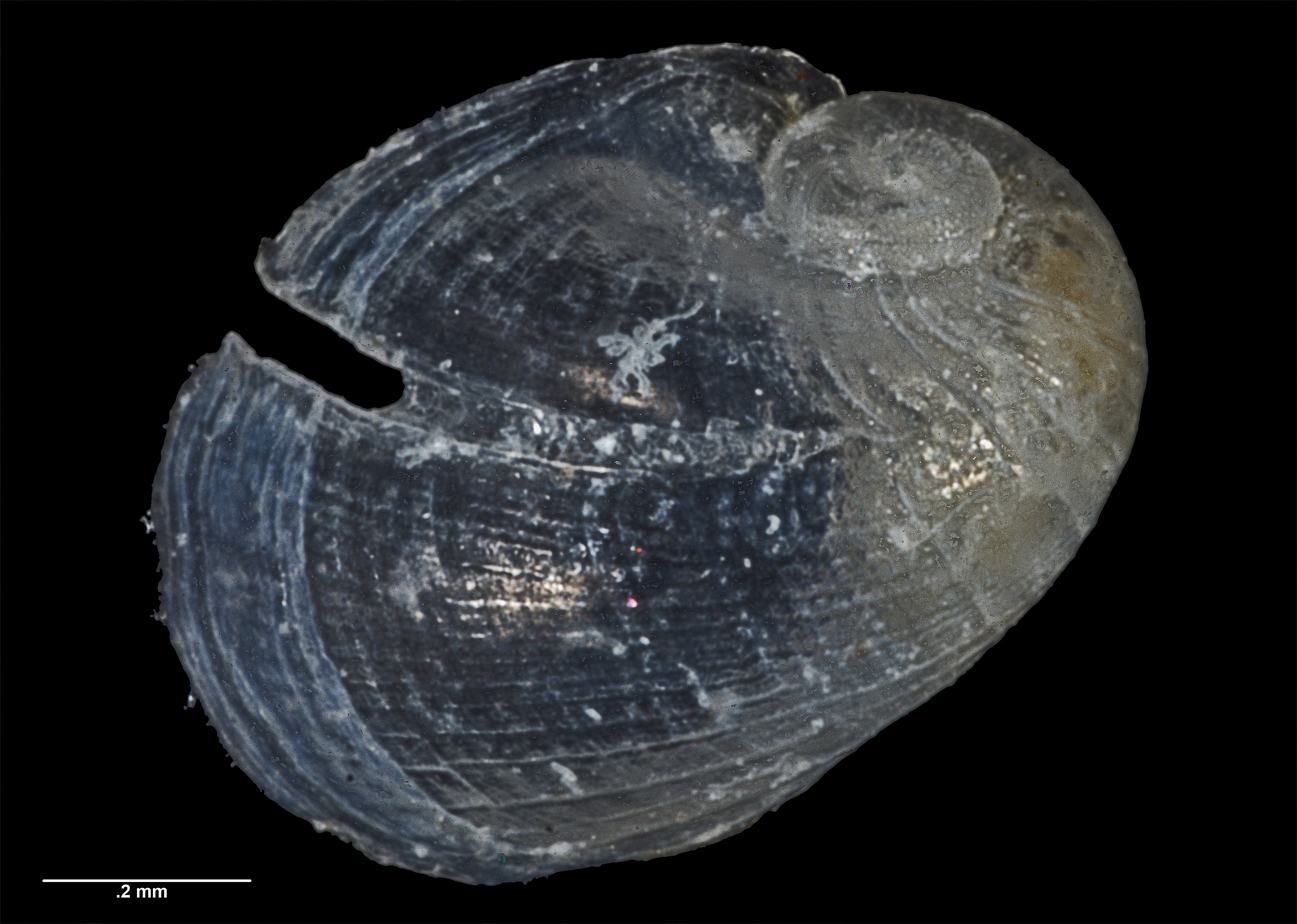
- Incisura rosea shell

Scientific classification
- Kingdom: Animalia
- Phylum: Mollusca
- Class: Gastropoda
- Subclass: Vetigastropoda
- Order: Lepetellida
- Family: Scissurellidae
- Genus: Incisura; Hedley, 1904

Type species
- Scissurella lyttleltonensis E. A. Smith, 1894

= Incisura (gastropod) =

Genus of gastropods

Incisura is a genus of sea snails or keyhole limpets, marine gastropod molluscs in the family Scissurellidae.

== Species ==
Species within the genus Incisura include:

- Incisura auriformis Geiger & Jansen, 2004
- Incisura lytteltonensis (E. A. Smith, 1894)
- Incisura remota (Iredale, 1924)
- Incisura rosea (Hedley, 1904)

Species brought into synonymy

- Incisura obliqua (Watson, 1886): synonym of Scissurella obliqua Watson, 1886
- Incisura vincentiana (Cotton, 1945): synonym of Incisura remota (Iredale, 1924)
