= Sinezona brevis =

Scientific classification
- Kingdom: Animalia
- Phylum: Mollusca
- Class: Gastropoda
- Subclass: Vetigastropoda
- Order: Lepetellida
- Family: Scissurellidae
- Genus: Sinezona
- Species: S. brevis

Binomial name
- Sinezona brevis (Hedley, 1904)

Synonyms
- Schismope brevis Hedley, 1904

Species of gastropod

Sinezona brevis is a species of small sea snail, a marine gastropod mollusc in the family Scissurellidae.

== Description ==
The white shell reaches a height of 1 mm. The solid shell has a depressed, turbinate shape. It is openly perforate to imperforate. The sculpture shows distant longitudinal lamellate ribs that cross the whorl from the suture to the umbilicus. Their interstices contain raised spiral threads, which grow coarser on approaching the umbilicus. The protoconch contains 1½ whorl, concluding with a prominent varix. The three whorls are tabulate above, and rounded below. The body whorl descends rapidly. The aperture is roundly ovate. The sharp outer lip is convex. The inner lip spreads as a distinct callosity over the body, and sometimes seals the umbilicus partly or wholly up. The columella is concave. The narrow umbilicus is deep, and is bordered with a raised ridge, or is closed up. The foramen is large, and distant from the margin, to which a furrow joins it. The fasciole is extremity short, terminating half a whorl behind the aperture. it is bordered by keels and is traversed by lamellae, which correspond to the longitudinal ribs.

== Distribution ==
This marine species occurs off New Zealand.
