= Depressizona =

Scientific classification
- Kingdom: Animalia
- Phylum: Mollusca
- Class: Gastropoda
- Subclass: Vetigastropoda
- Order: Lepetellida
- Superfamily: Scissurelloidea
- Family: Depressizonidae; Geiger, 2003
- Genus: Depressizona; Geiger, 2003

Type species
- Depressizona exorum Geiger, 2003 (type by original designation)

Diversity
- 2 species

Genus of gastropods

Depressizona is a genus of small to minute sea snails, marine gastropod molluscs or micromolluscs in the superfamily Scissurelloidea.

Depressizona is the only genus within the family Depressizonidae.

Depressizonidae was described as the subfamily Depressizoninae Geiger, 2003, in 2003. Then in 2005 it was considered to be a synonym of Scissurellinae in the family Scissurellidae according to the taxonomy of Bouchet & Roctoi (2005) and it has also been placed in Scissurellidae. In 2009 it was updated to the family level, Depressizonidae, when the second known species Depressizona axiosculpta was described.

== Species ==
Genus Depressizona contains two species only:

- Depressizona axiosculpta Geiger, 2009 It was described from only one specimen in poor condition known from Tonga. Geiger (2012) illustrated a second specimen in much better condition.
- Depressizona exorum Geiger, 2003 - from Easter Island. Type species of the genus Depressizona.

== Description ==
The shape of the shell is calyptraeiform.
