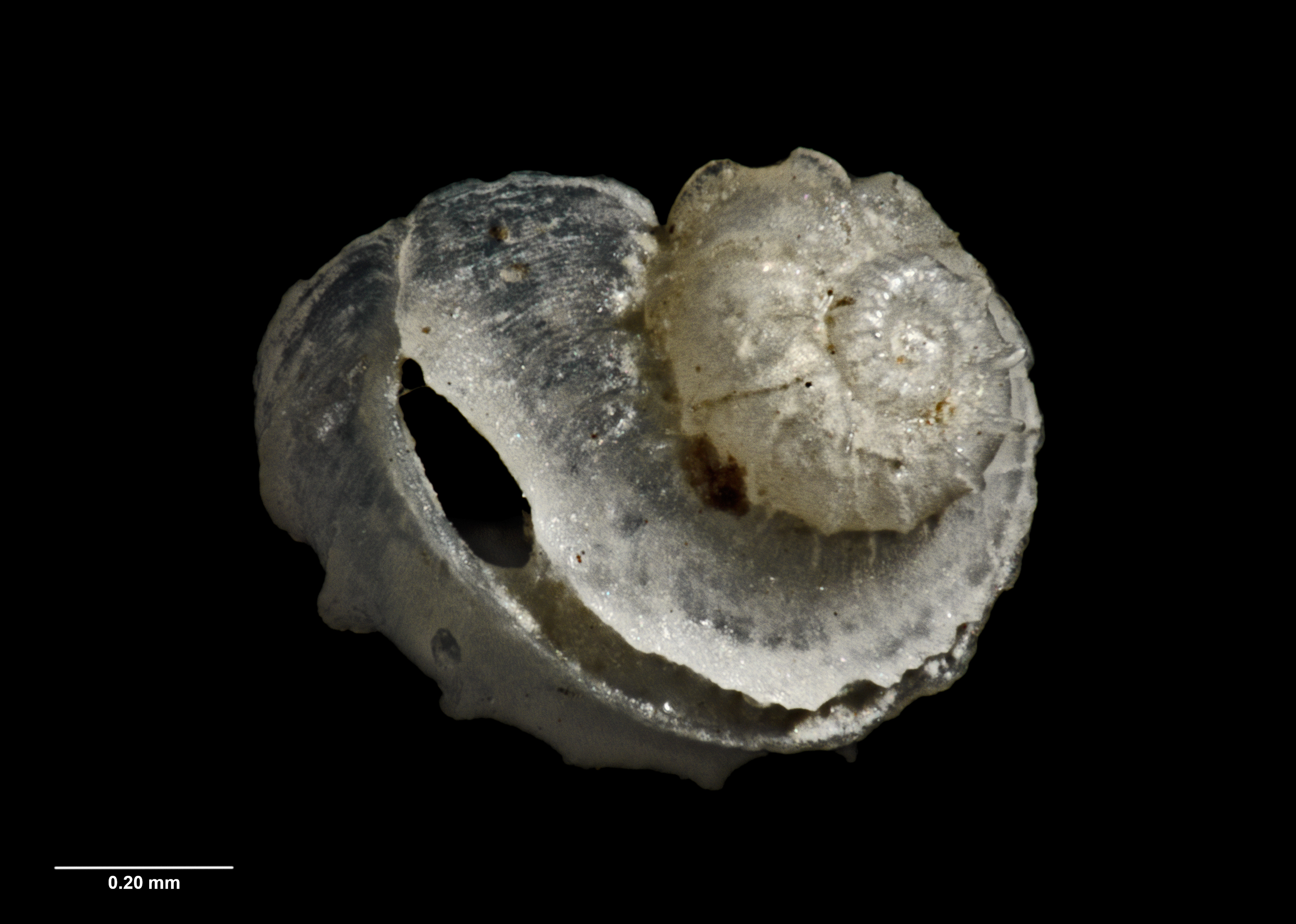

Scientific classification
- Kingdom: Animalia
- Phylum: Mollusca
- Class: Gastropoda
- Subclass: Vetigastropoda
- Order: Lepetellida
- Family: Scissurellidae
- Genus: Sinezona
- Species: S. iota

Binomial name
- Sinezona iota (Hedley, 1904)

Synonyms
- Schismope iota Finlay, 1926 (original combination)

= Sinezona iota =

Species of gastropod

Sinezona iota is a species of small sea snail, a marine gastropod mollusc or micromollusc in the family Scissurellidae.

== Distribution ==
This marine species occurs off New Zealand.
