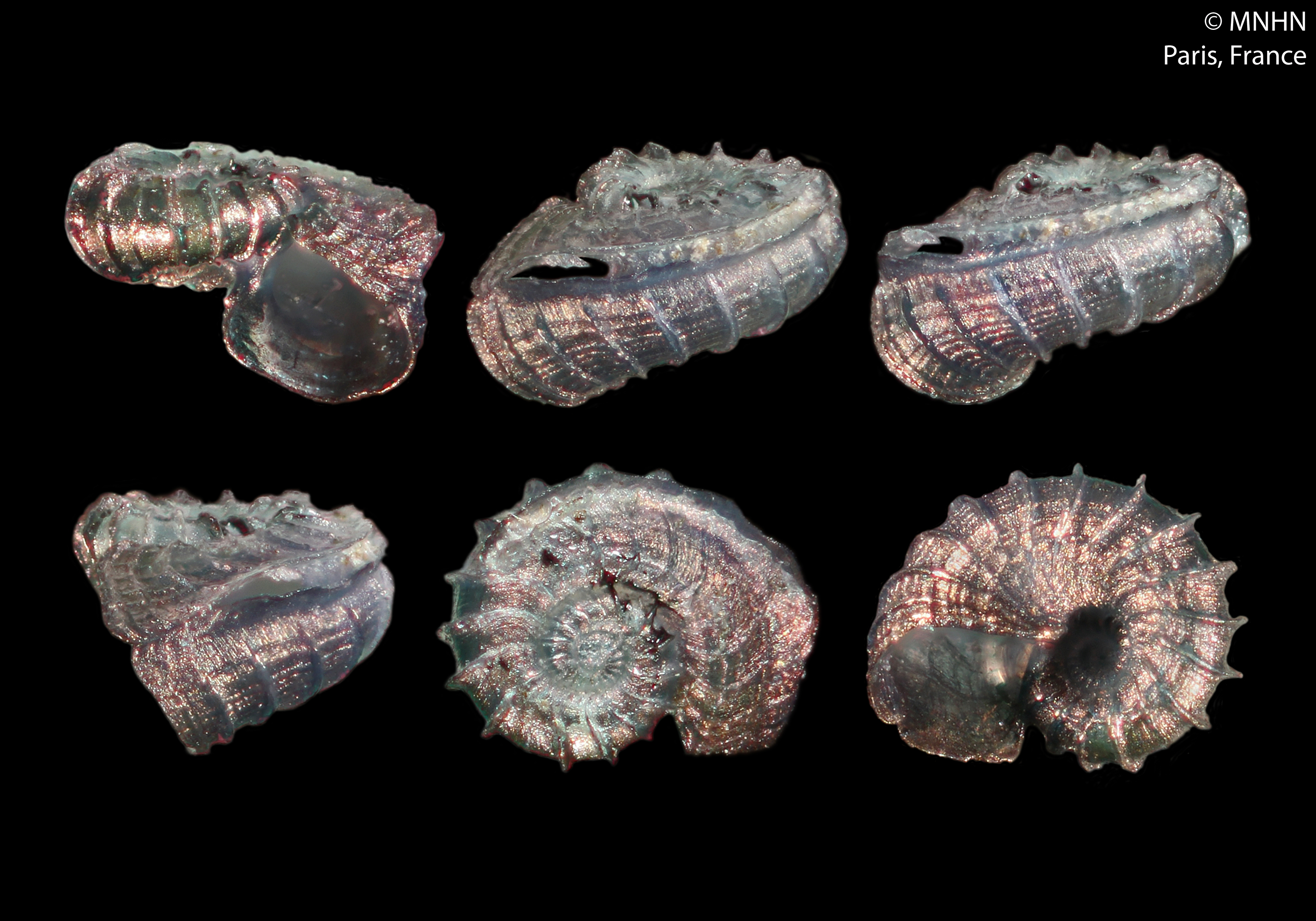
- Satondella dantarti

Scientific classification
- Kingdom: Animalia
- Phylum: Mollusca
- Class: Gastropoda
- Subclass: Vetigastropoda
- Order: Lepetellida
- Superfamily: Scissurelloidea
- Family: Scissurellidae
- Genus: Satondella; Bandel, 1998

Type species
- Satondella minuta Bandel, 1998

= Satondella =

Genus of gastropods

Satondella is a genus of sea snails, marine gastropod molluscs in the family Scissurellidae.

== Species ==
Species within the genus Satondella include:

- Satondella azonata Geiger & B.A. Marshall, 2012
- Satondella bicristata Geiger & B.A. Marshall, 2012
- Satondella brasiliensis (Mattar, 1987)
- Satondella cachoi Luque, Geiger & Rolán, 2011
- Satondella danieli Segers, Swinnen & Abreu, 2009
- Satondella dantarti Luque, Geiger & Rolán, 2011
- Satondella goudi Geiger, 2012
- Satondella minuta Bandel, 1998
- Satondella senni Geiger, 2003
- Satondella tabulata (Watson, 1886)
