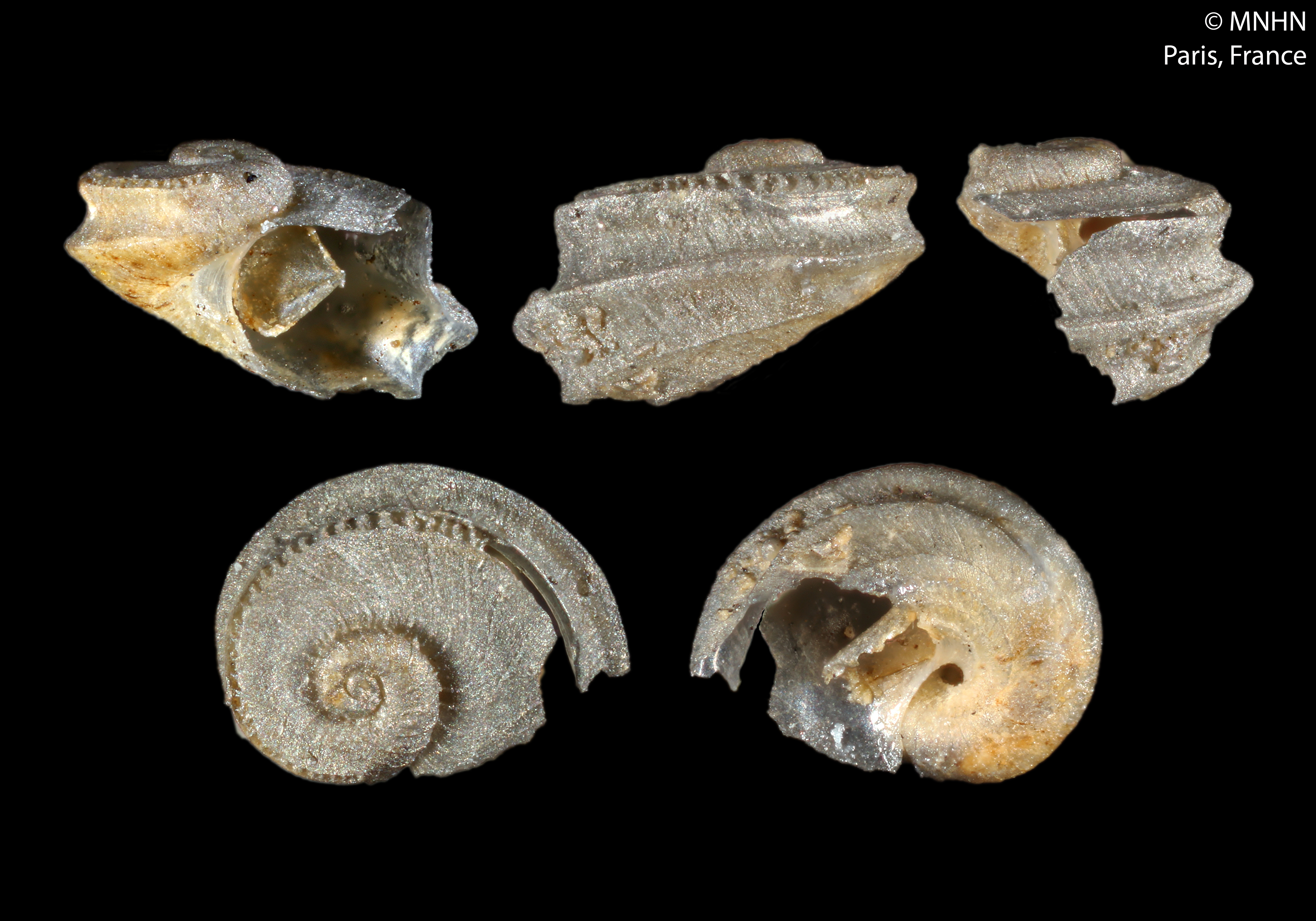
- Shell of Sukashitrochus dorbignyi (lectotype at MNHN, Paris)

Scientific classification
- Kingdom: Animalia
- Phylum: Mollusca
- Class: Gastropoda
- Subclass: Vetigastropoda
- Order: Lepetellida
- Superfamily: Scissurelloidea
- Family: Scissurellidae
- Genus: Sukashitrochus
- Species: S. dorbignyi

Binomial name
- Sukashitrochus dorbignyi (Audouin, 1826)

Synonyms
- Scissurella dorbignii Audouin, 1826; Sinezona armillata Yaron, 1983; Sinezona tricarinata Yaron, 1983; Sukashitrochus armillatus (Yaron, 1983); Sukashitrochus maraisi Herbert, 1986; Sukashitrochus tricarinatus (Yaron, 1983)

= Sukashitrochus dorbignyi =

Species of gastropod

Sukashitrochus dorbignyi is a species of minute sea snail, a marine gastropod mollusk or micromollusk in the family Scissurellidae, the little slit snails.

== Description ==
The thin, transparent, glassy, white shell is very small. Its height reaches 1½ mm. It has an ovate shape, and is rather depressed. It consists of 3 rather rapidly increasing whorls. It has a very peculiar sculpture. Under the rather elevated slit fasciole there are two elevated lirae, and the base has concentric lirae and grooves, while the usual growth striae are not lacking. In the example figured in the "Description of Egypt" there is a deep groove between the keel and the upper of the two spiral lirae. In the examples observed by me (= W.H. Dall) the groove is very shallow, and bears an elevated line. The umbilicus is moderate. The oblique aperture is ovate.

== Distribution ==
This species occurs in the Red Sea.
