= Satondella brasiliensis =

Scientific classification
- Kingdom: Animalia
- Phylum: Mollusca
- Class: Gastropoda
- Subclass: Vetigastropoda
- Order: Lepetellida
- Superfamily: Scissurelloidea
- Family: Scissurellidae
- Genus: Satondella
- Species: S. brasiliensis

Binomial name
- Satondella brasiliensis (Mattar, 1987)

Synonyms
- Sinezona brasiliensis Mattar, 1987 (basionym)

Species of gastropod

Satondella brasiliensis is a species of minute sea snail, a marine gastropod mollusk or micromollusk in the family Scissurellidae, the little slit snails.

== Description ==
The shell grows to a height of 0.9-1.0mm and has a unique chimney-like foramen.

Live S. brasiliensis is somewhat yellowish, whereas the shells are seen to be off-white.

The protoconch has a spiral, smooth and hexagonal sculpture.

The operculum is circular, thin, multispiral, with a central nucleus.

It has a narrow umbilicus and numerous axial ribs.

== Distribution ==
Life species inhabits the West Atlantic Ocean along Cuba and Bermuda at a depth between 40 and 50 m in Cuba, and 81–91 m in Bermuda.

Empty shells are found around the Bahamas, Florida, Gulf of Mexico, Honduras, Toboga Island, as well as Brazil, at depths between 28 and 198 m.
