= Sukashitrochus atkinsoni =

Scientific classification
- Kingdom: Animalia
- Phylum: Mollusca
- Class: Gastropoda
- Subclass: Vetigastropoda
- Order: Lepetellida
- Superfamily: Scissurelloidea
- Family: Scissurellidae
- Genus: Sukashitrochus
- Species: S. atkinsoni

Binomial name
- Sukashitrochus atkinsoni (Tenison Woods, 1877)

Synonyms
- Schismope carinata Watson, 1886; Schismope tasmanica Petterd, 1879; Scissurella atkinsoni Tenison Woods, 1877; Sinezona atkinsoni Tenison-Woods, J.E., 1877; Sukashitrochus tasmanicus (Petterd, 1879)

Species of gastropod

Sukashitrochus atkinsoni is a species of small sea snail, a marine gastropod mollusk or micromollusk in the family Scissurellidae, the little slit snails.

== Description ==
The minute, brown shell attains a height of 2 mm. It has a globose-depressed shape. The spire is short, low, and blunt. The three whorls widen rapidly and are plane above. The last whorl descends very deeply toward the aperture, with a strong keel at the shoulder, occupied by the anal fasciole, and another keel at the periphery, the space between them concave. Below this carina there are about 3 rather separated spiral lira, and around the umbilicus three more. The keels are obsolete for a short distance behind the aperture. The fine growth striae are scarcely perceptible. The slit fasciole present on the last 1½ whorls is very narrow. Its edges are pinched up into a strong keel. It terminates about ½ mm or ¾ mm behind the peristome in a long, narrow slot. The ovate aperture is very oblique. It is narrowed above. The columella is slightly arcuate, and nearly vertical. The umbilicus is narrowly perforated, funnel-shaped, and smooth inside. On old shells the median carina becomes rounded on the last ¾ whorl, and there are numerous spiral riblets both above and below the slit fasciole.

== Distribution ==
This marine species occurs off Queensland to South Australia and Western Australia; off Tasmania.
