= Temnocinclis =

Scientific classification
- Kingdom: Animalia
- Phylum: Mollusca
- Class: Gastropoda
- Subclass: Vetigastropoda
- Order: Lepetellida
- Family: Sutilizonidae
- Genus: Temnocinclis
- Species: T. euripes

Binomial name
- Temnocinclis euripes McLean, 1989

Monotypic genus of gastropods

Temnocinclis is a monotypic genus of sea snails in family Sutilizonidae containing the single species Temnocinclis euripes. This mollusc, a species of slit-limpet that measures up to four millimeters long, lives at hydrothermal vents.

== Species ==
- Temnocinclis euripes McLean, 1989
