= Temnozaga =

Scientific classification
- Kingdom: Animalia
- Phylum: Mollusca
- Class: Gastropoda
- Subclass: Vetigastropoda
- Order: Lepetellida
- Family: Sutilizonidae
- Genus: Temnozaga; McLean, 1989

Genus of gastropods

Temnozaga is a genus of sea snails, marine gastropod mollusks in the family Sutilizonidae.

== Species ==
Species within the genus Temnozaga include:

- Temnozaga parilis McLean, 1989
