= Sutilizonidae =

Scientific classification
- Kingdom: Animalia
- Phylum: Mollusca
- Class: Gastropoda
- Subclass: Vetigastropoda
- Order: Lepetellida
- Superfamily: Lepetodriloidea
- Family: Sutilizonidae; McLean, 1989

Synonyms
- Sutulizonidae (spelling error)

Family of gastropods

Sutilizonidae is a taxonomic family of sea snails, deepwater hydrothermal vent snails, and marine gastropod molluscs in the clade Vetigastropoda (according to the taxonomy of the Gastropoda by Bouchet & Rocroi, 2005).

== Taxonomy ==
This family has no subfamilies.

Temnocinclinae McLean, 1989 was considered to be a synonym of Sutilizonidae by Bouchet & Rocroi (2005), but was updated to family level as Temnocinclidae by Geiger in 2009.

== Genera ==
Genera within the family Sutilizonidae include:

- Sutilizona McLean, 1989
- Temnocinclis McLean, 1989
- Temnozaga McLean, 1989
