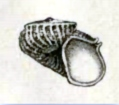
- Shell of Scissurella costata

Scientific classification
- Kingdom: Animalia
- Phylum: Mollusca
- Class: Gastropoda
- Subclass: Vetigastropoda
- Order: Lepetellida
- Superfamily: Scissurelloidea
- Family: Scissurellidae; Gray, 1847

= Scissurellidae =

Scissurellidae Temporal range: Upper Cretaceous–Recent

Family of gastropods

Scissurellidae, sometimes known by the common name little slit snails, are a taxonomic family of minute sea snails, marine gastropod molluscs or micromolluscs in the clade Vetigastropoda (according to the taxonomy of the Gastropoda by Bouchet & Rocroi, 2005).

The shells of these snails vary in adult size from less than 6 mm to less than 1 mm.

== Distribution ==
Scissurellids occur world-wide, from the intertidal zone down to the abyssal depths, including around hydrothermal vents.

== Taxonomy ==
There are about 169 living described species of Scissurellidae, but the diversity of scissurellids is still far from being completely assessed (approximately 60 collected species await description). The monophyly of the family is questionable.

In 2003, there were about twenty-five genera divided into five subfamilies (Scissurellinae, Anatominae, Sutilizoninae, Temnocinclinae, Larocheinae) . Three of these subfamilies were later updated to family level.

According to the taxonomy of the Gastropoda by Bouchet & Rocroi, 2005), this family consisted of the two following subfamilies :

- Scissurellinae Gray, 1847 - synonym: Depressizoninae Geiger, 2003; now accepted with family rank Scissurellidae.
- Larocheinae Finlay, 1927: now elevated to family rank as Larocheidae.

However Geiger (2009) elevated Depressizoninae to the family rank as Depressizonidae.

== Genera ==
Genera in the family Scissurellidae include:

- Coronadoa Bartsch, 1915
- Incisura Hedley, 1904
- Satondella Bandel, 1998
- Scissurella d'Orbigny, 1824
- Sinezona Finlay, 1927
- Sukashitrochus Habe & Kosuge, 1964
- Triassurella A. Nützel and D. L. Geiger. 2006

Genera brought into synonymy

- Ariella Bandel, 1998: synonym of Sinezona Finlay, 1926
- Daizona Bandel, 1998: synonym of Sinezona Finlay, 1926
- Maxwellella Bandel, 1998: synonym of Scissurella d'Orbigny, 1824
- † Praescissurella Lozouet, 1998: synonym of Scissurella d'Orbigny, 1824
- † Reussella Bandel, 1998: synonym of Scissurella d'Orbigny, 1824
- Schismope Jeffreys, 1856: synonym of Scissurella d'Orbigny, 1824
- Scissurona Iredale, 1824: synonym of Incisura Hedley, 1904
- Temnocinclis - in its own family Sutilizonidae
- Temnozaga - in its own family Sutilizonidae
- Woodwardia Crosse & P. Fischer, 1861: synonym of Scissurella d'Orbigny, 1824
