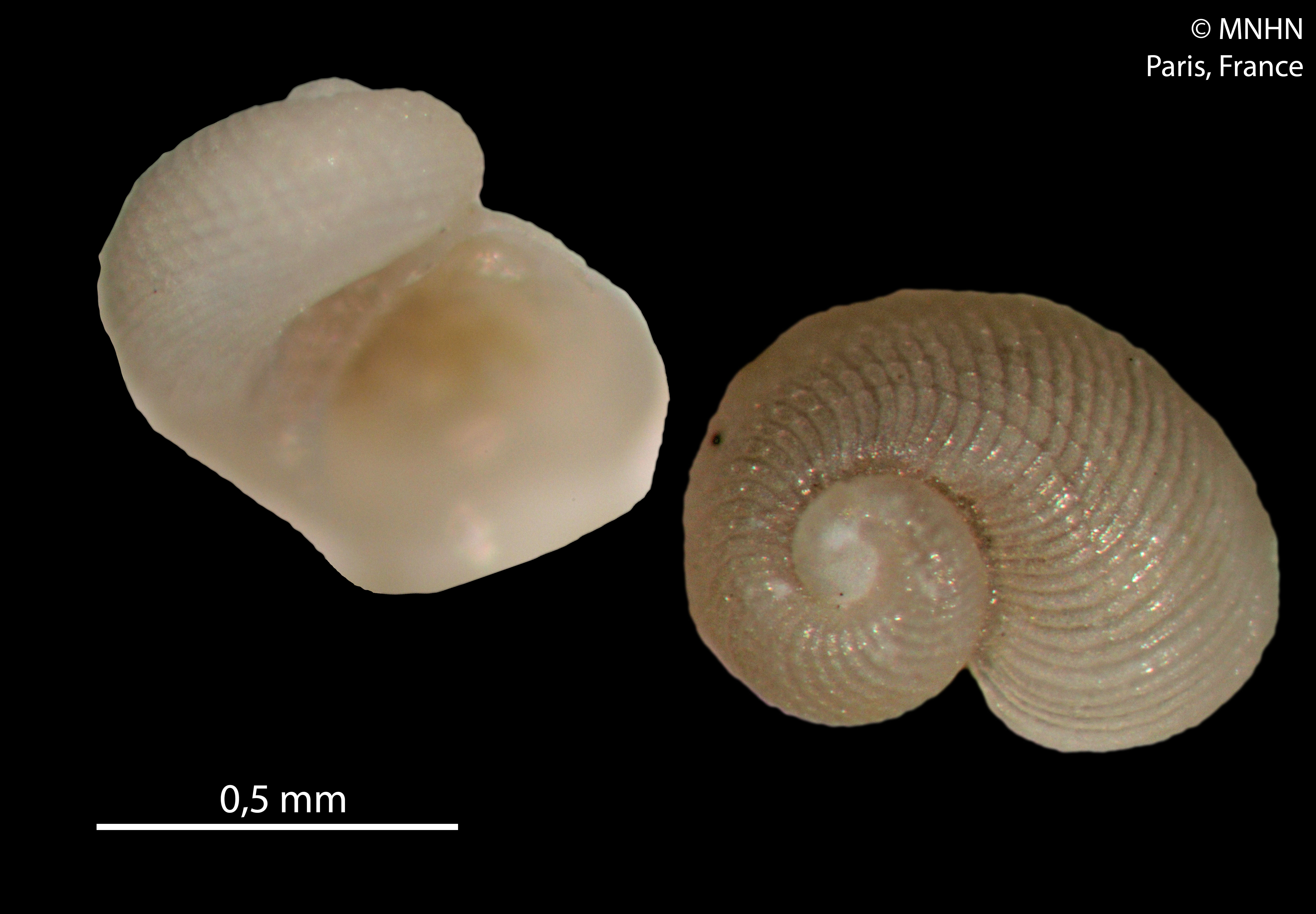
- Shell of Bathyxylophila pusilla (paratype at MNHN, Paris)

Scientific classification
- Kingdom: Animalia
- Phylum: Mollusca
- Class: Gastropoda
- Subclass: Vetigastropoda
- Order: Lepetellida
- Superfamily: Scissurelloidea
- Family: Larocheidae
- Genus: Bathyxylophila
- Species: B. pusilla

Binomial name
- Bathyxylophila pusilla B. A. Marshall, 1988

= Bathyxylophila pusilla =

Species of gastropod

Bathyxylophila pusilla is a species of sea snail, a marine gastropod mollusk in the family Larocheidae.

== Distribution ==
This species occurs in the bathyal zone off New Zealand.
