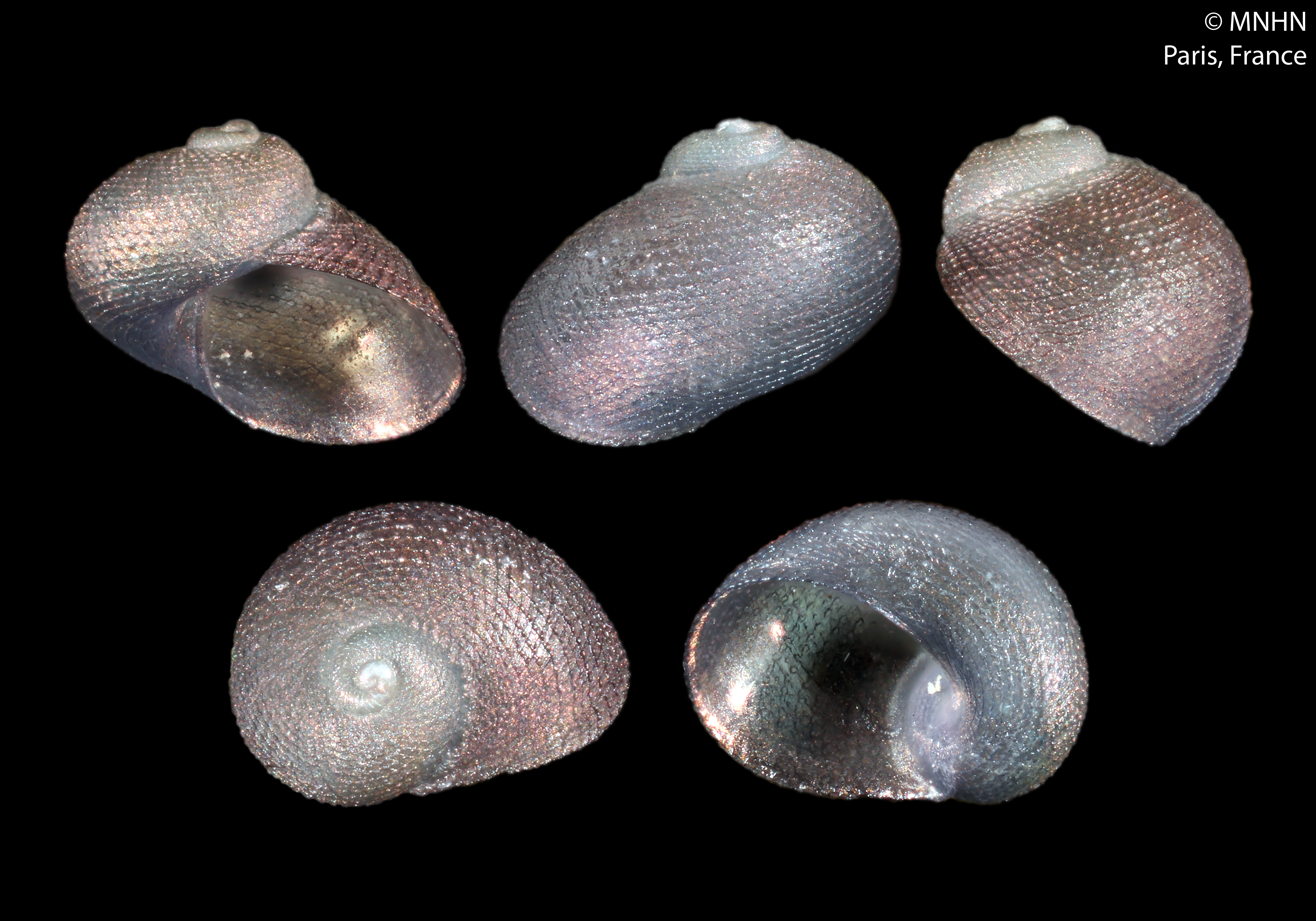

Scientific classification
- Kingdom: Animalia
- Phylum: Mollusca
- Class: Gastropoda
- Subclass: Vetigastropoda
- Order: Lepetellida
- Family: Larocheidae
- Genus: Trogloconcha
- Species: T. lozoueti

Binomial name
- Trogloconcha lozoueti Geiger, 2008

= Trogloconcha lozoueti =

Species of gastropod

Trogloconcha lozoueti is a species of sea snail, a marine gastropod mollusc in the family Larocheidae.
