= Larochea secunda =

Scientific classification
- Kingdom: Animalia
- Phylum: Mollusca
- Class: Gastropoda
- Subclass: Vetigastropoda
- Order: Lepetellida
- Family: Larocheidae
- Genus: Larochea
- Species: L. secunda

Binomial name
- Larochea secunda Powell, 1937

Species of gastropod

Larochea secunda is an extremely minute species of sea snail, a marine gastropod mollusc or micromollusc in the family Larocheidae.

== Description ==
The thin, minute, white and globose shell reaches a height of 0.9 mm (0.035 in).

== Distribution ==
This marine species occurs off New Zealand.
