= Larochea scitula =

Scientific classification
- Kingdom: Animalia
- Phylum: Mollusca
- Class: Gastropoda
- Subclass: Vetigastropoda
- Order: Lepetellida
- Superfamily: Scissurelloidea
- Family: Larocheidae
- Genus: Larochea
- Species: L. scitula

Binomial name
- Larochea scitula Marshall, 1993

Species of gastropod

Larochea scitula is a species of sea snail, a marine gastropod mollusk or micromollusk in the family Larocheidae.

== Distribution ==
This marine species occurs off New Zealand.
