= Larocheopsis macrostoma =

Scientific classification
- Kingdom: Animalia
- Phylum: Mollusca
- Class: Gastropoda
- Subclass: Vetigastropoda
- Order: Lepetellida
- Superfamily: Scissurelloidea
- Family: Larocheidae
- Genus: Larocheopsis
- Species: L. macrostoma

Binomial name
- Larocheopsis macrostoma Geiger & B.A. Marshall, 2012

Species of gastropod

Larocheopsis macrostoma is a species of sea snail, a marine gastropod mollusc or micromollusc in the family Larocheidae.
