= Bathyxylophila peroniana =

Scientific classification
- Kingdom: Animalia
- Phylum: Mollusca
- Class: Gastropoda
- Subclass: Vetigastropoda
- Order: Lepetellida
- Superfamily: Scissurelloidea
- Family: Larocheidae
- Genus: Bathyxylophila
- Species: B. peroniana

Binomial name
- Bathyxylophila peroniana B.A. Marshall, 1988

Species of gastropod

Bathyxylophila peroniana is a species of minute sea snail, a marine gastropod mollusk or micromollusk in the family Larocheidae.

== Description ==
The height of the shell reaches 1.1 mm.

== Distribution ==
This species occurs in the Broken Bay, New South Wales, Australia.
