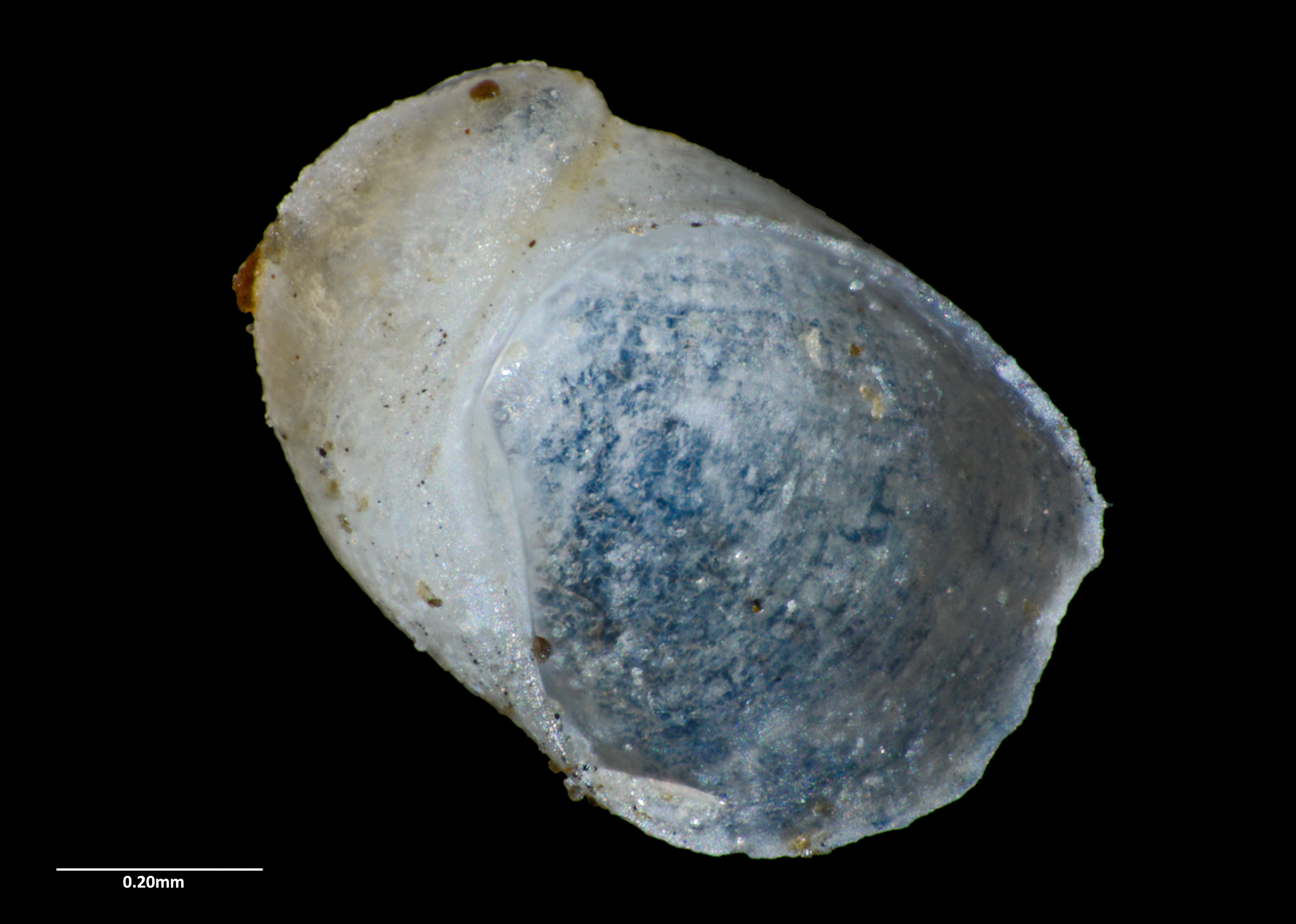
- Larochea miranda

Scientific classification
- Kingdom: Animalia
- Phylum: Mollusca
- Class: Gastropoda
- Subclass: Vetigastropoda
- Order: Lepetellida
- Family: Larocheidae
- Genus: Larochea
- Species: L. miranda

Binomial name
- Larochea miranda Finlay, 1927

= Larochea miranda =

Species of gastropod

Larochea miranda is an extremely minute species of sea snail, a marine gastropod mollusc or micromollusc in the family Larocheidae.

== Distribution ==
This marine species occurs off New Zealand.
