= Larochea spirata =

Scientific classification
- Kingdom: Animalia
- Phylum: Mollusca
- Class: Gastropoda
- Subclass: Vetigastropoda
- Order: Lepetellida
- Superfamily: Scissurelloidea
- Family: Larocheidae
- Genus: Larochea
- Species: L. spirata

Binomial name
- Larochea spirata Geiger & B.A. Marshall, 2012

Species of gastropod

Larochea spirata is a species of sea snail, a marine gastropod mollusc or micromollusc in the family Larocheidae.

== Distribution ==
This marine species occurs off New Zealand.
