= Larocheopsis amplexa =

Scientific classification
- Kingdom: Animalia
- Phylum: Mollusca
- Class: Gastropoda
- Subclass: Vetigastropoda
- Order: Lepetellida
- Superfamily: Scissurelloidea
- Family: Larocheidae
- Genus: Larocheopsis
- Species: L. amplexa

Binomial name
- Larocheopsis amplexa Marshall, 1993

Species of gastropod

Larocheopsis amplexa is a species of sea snail, a marine gastropod mollusk or micromollusk in the family Larocheidae.
