= Trogloconcha ohashii =

Scientific classification
- Kingdom: Animalia
- Phylum: Mollusca
- Class: Gastropoda
- Subclass: Vetigastropoda
- Order: Lepetellida
- Family: Larocheidae
- Genus: Trogloconcha
- Species: T. ohashii

Binomial name
- Trogloconcha ohashii Kase & Kano, 2002

Species of gastropod

Trogloconcha ohashii is a species of sea snail, a marine gastropod mollusc in the family Larocheidae.
