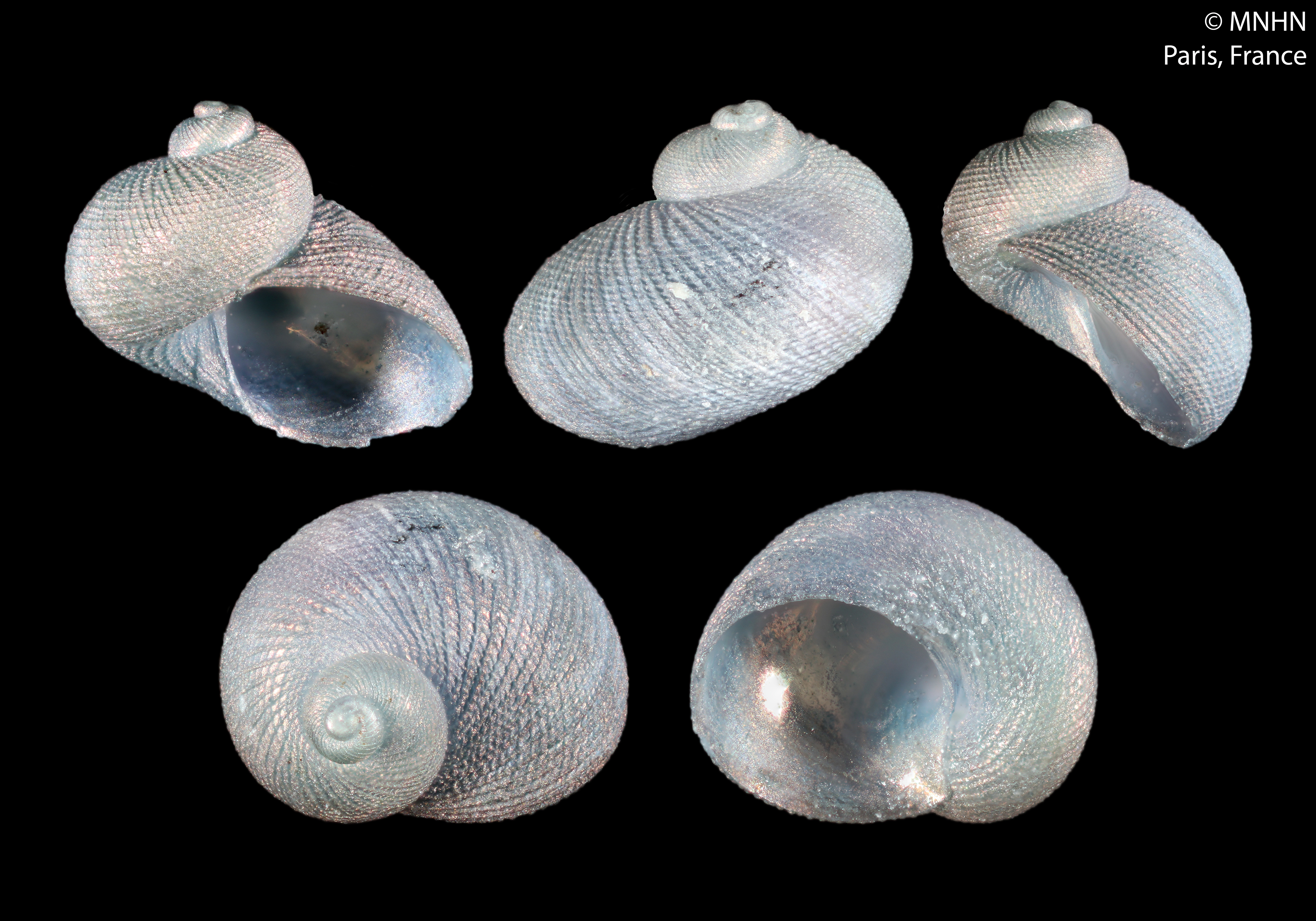
- Trogloconcha lamellinodosa (MNHN-IM-2000-25106)

Scientific classification
- Kingdom: Animalia
- Phylum: Mollusca
- Class: Gastropoda
- Subclass: Vetigastropoda
- Order: Lepetellida
- Family: Larocheidae
- Genus: Trogloconcha
- Species: T. lamellinodosa

Binomial name
- Trogloconcha lamellinodosa Geiger, 2012

= Trogloconcha lamellinodosa =

Species of gastropod

Trogloconcha lamellinodosa is a species of sea snail, a marine gastropod mollusc or micromollusc in the family Larocheidae.
