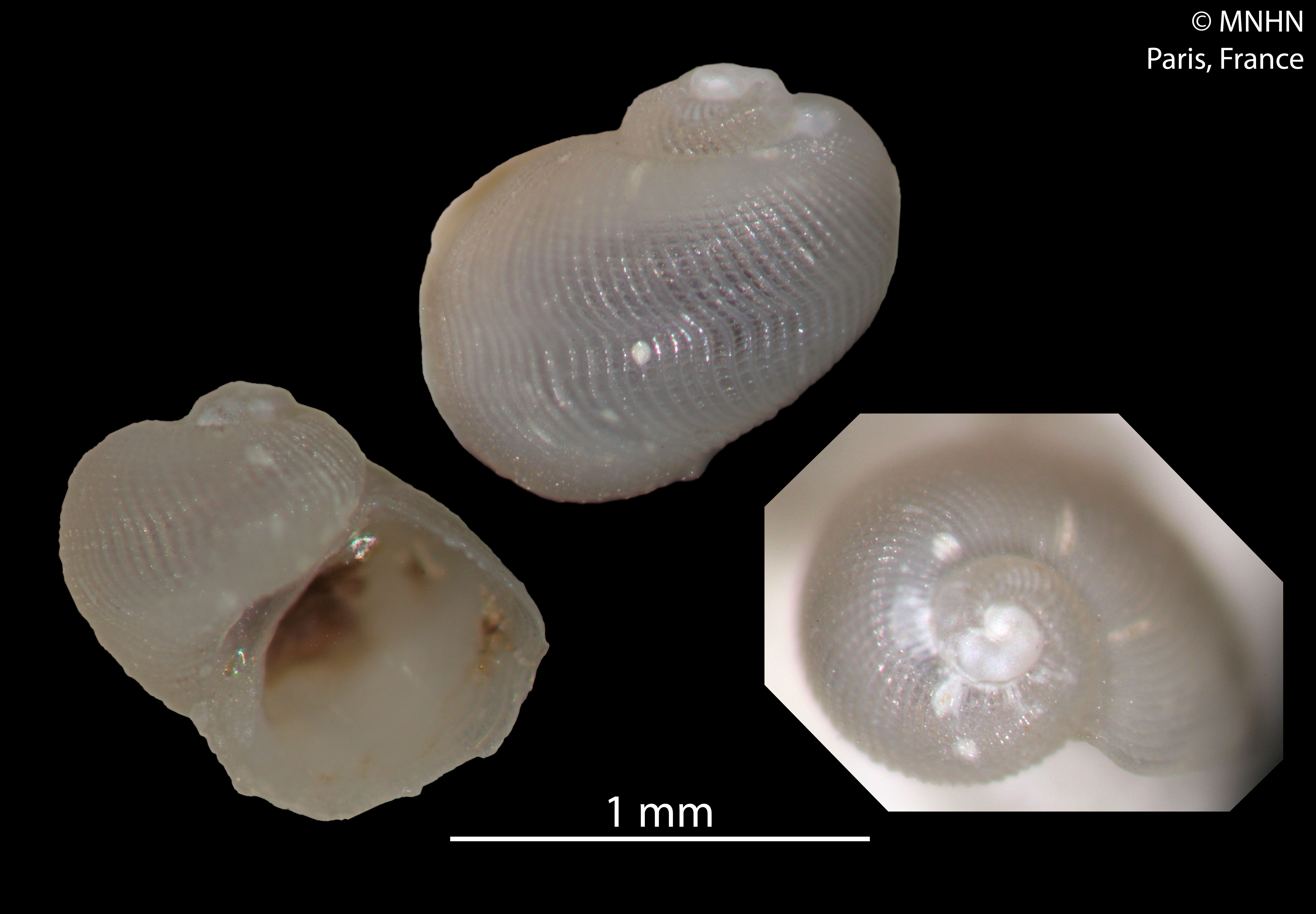
- Shell of Bathyxylophila excelsa (paratype at MNHN, Paris)

Scientific classification
- Kingdom: Animalia
- Phylum: Mollusca
- Class: Gastropoda
- Subclass: Vetigastropoda
- Order: Lepetellida
- Superfamily: Scissurelloidea
- Family: Larocheidae
- Genus: Bathyxylophila
- Species: B. excelsa

Binomial name
- Bathyxylophila excelsa B. A. Marshall, 1988

= Bathyxylophila excelsa =

Species of gastropod

Bathyxylophila excelsa is a species of sea snail, a marine gastropod mollusk in the family Larocheidae, t

It was originally placed in the subfamily Skeneinae of the family Turbinidae.

== Distribution ==
This species occurs in bathyal zone off New Zealand.
