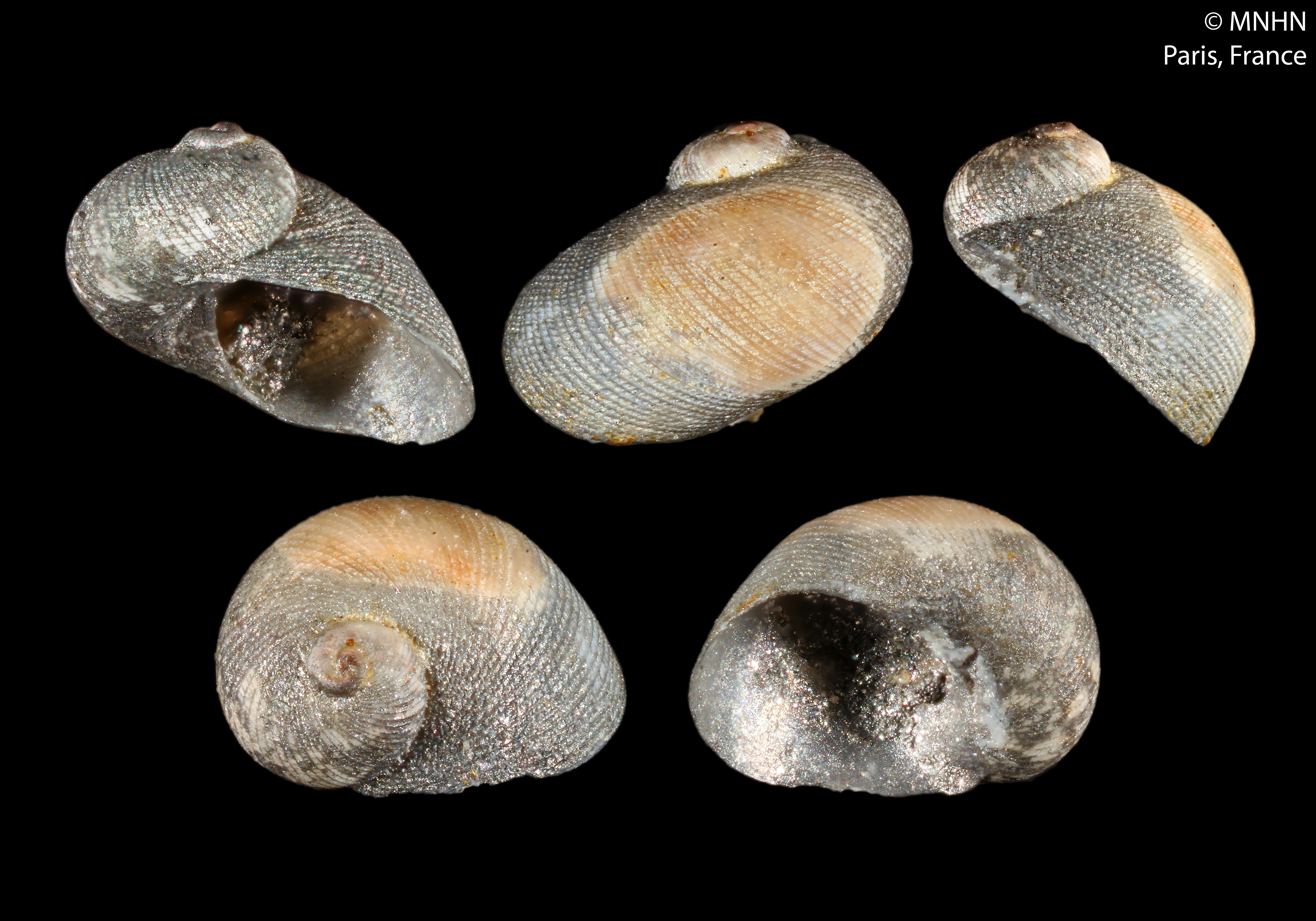
- Shell of † Trogloconcha marshalli holotype at MNHN, Paris)

Scientific classification
- Kingdom: Animalia
- Phylum: Mollusca
- Class: Gastropoda
- Subclass: Vetigastropoda
- Order: Lepetellida
- Superfamily: Scissurelloidea
- Family: Larocheidae
- Genus: Trogloconcha; Kase & Kano, 2002

Type species
- Trogloconcha ohashii Kase & Kano, 2002

= Trogloconcha =

Genus of gastropods

Trogloconcha is a genus of sea snails, marine gastropod molluscs in the family Larocheidae.

== Species ==
Species within the genus Trogloconcha include:

- Trogloconcha christinae Geiger, 2003
- Trogloconcha lamellinodosa Geiger, 2012
- Trogloconcha lozoueti Geiger, 2008
- † Trogloconcha marshalli (Lozouet, 1998)
- Trogloconcha ohashii Kase & Kano, 2002
- Trogloconcha tesselata Kase & Kano, 2002
- Trogloconcha yoidanyi Fr. Giusti, Pagli & Micali, 2018
