= Larochea =

Scientific classification
- Kingdom: Animalia
- Phylum: Mollusca
- Class: Gastropoda
- Subclass: Vetigastropoda
- Order: Lepetellida
- Family: Larocheidae
- Genus: Larochea; Finlay, 1927

Type species
- Larochea miranda Finlay, 1927

Species
- See text

Genus of gastropods

Larochea is a genus of minute slug-like sea snails, marine gastropod molluscs in the family Larocheidae.

== Species ==
Species within the genus Larochea include:

- Larochea miranda Finlay, 1927
- Larochea scitula Marshall, 1993
- Larochea secunda Powell, 1937
- Larochea spirata Geiger & B.A. Marshall, 2012
