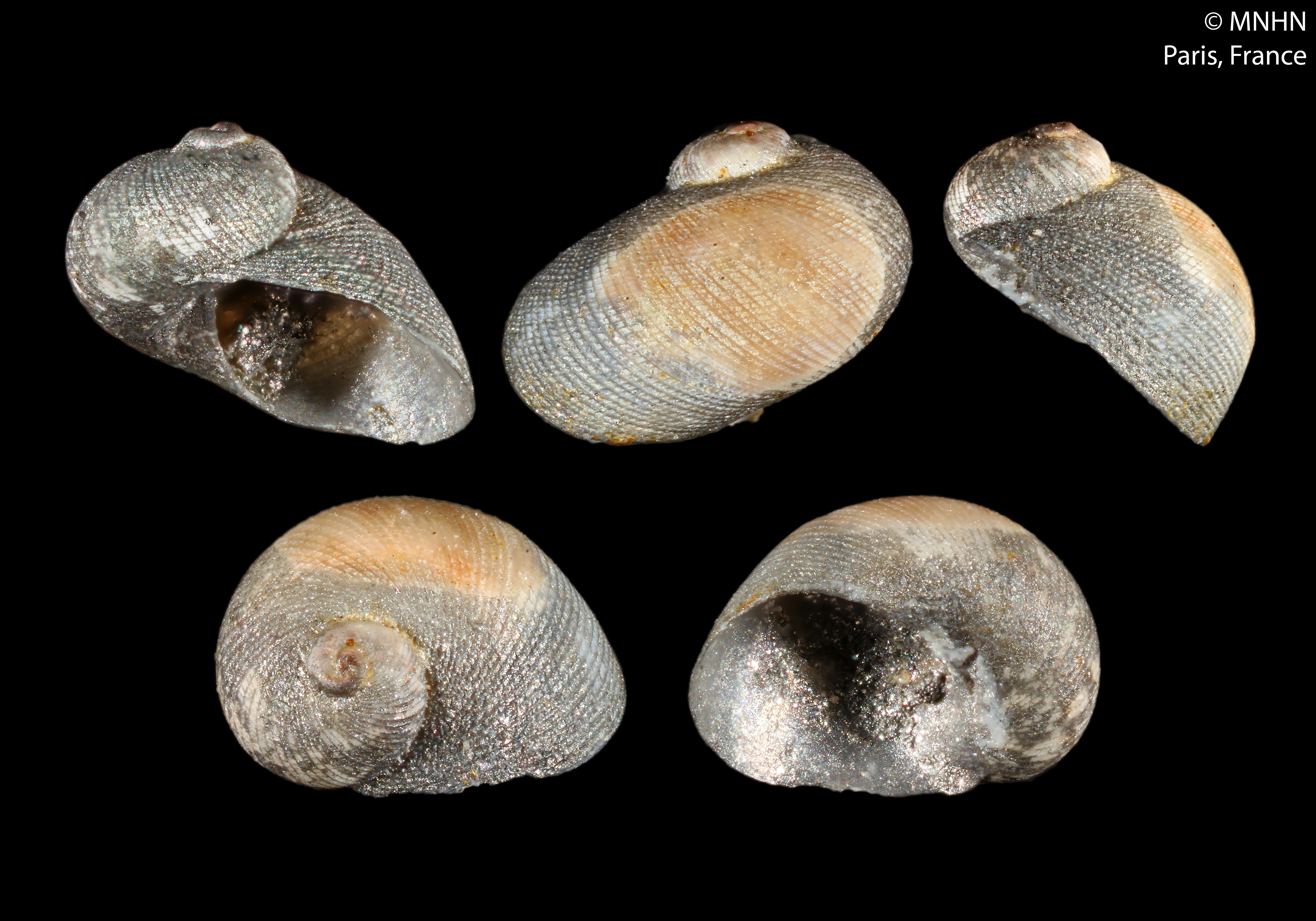
- Larocheopsis marshalli shells

Scientific classification
- Kingdom: Animalia
- Phylum: Mollusca
- Class: Gastropoda
- Subclass: Vetigastropoda
- Order: Lepetellida
- Superfamily: Scissurelloidea
- Family: Larocheidae
- Genus: Larocheopsis; B.A. Marshall, 1993

Type species
- Larocheopsis amplexa B. A. Marshall, 1993

= Larocheopsis =

Genus of gastropods

Larocheopsis is a genus of small to minute sea snails, marine gastropod mollusks or micromollusks in the family Larocheidae.

== Species ==
Species within the genus Larocheopsis include:

- Larocheopsis amplexa Marshall, 1993
- Larocheopsis macrostoma Geiger & B.A. Marshall, 2012
- † Larocheopsis microclathrata (Gougerot & Le Renard, 1977)

Species brought into synonymy

- † Larocheopsis marshalli Lozouet, 1998: synonym of † Trogloconcha marshalli (Lozouet, 1998) (original combination)
