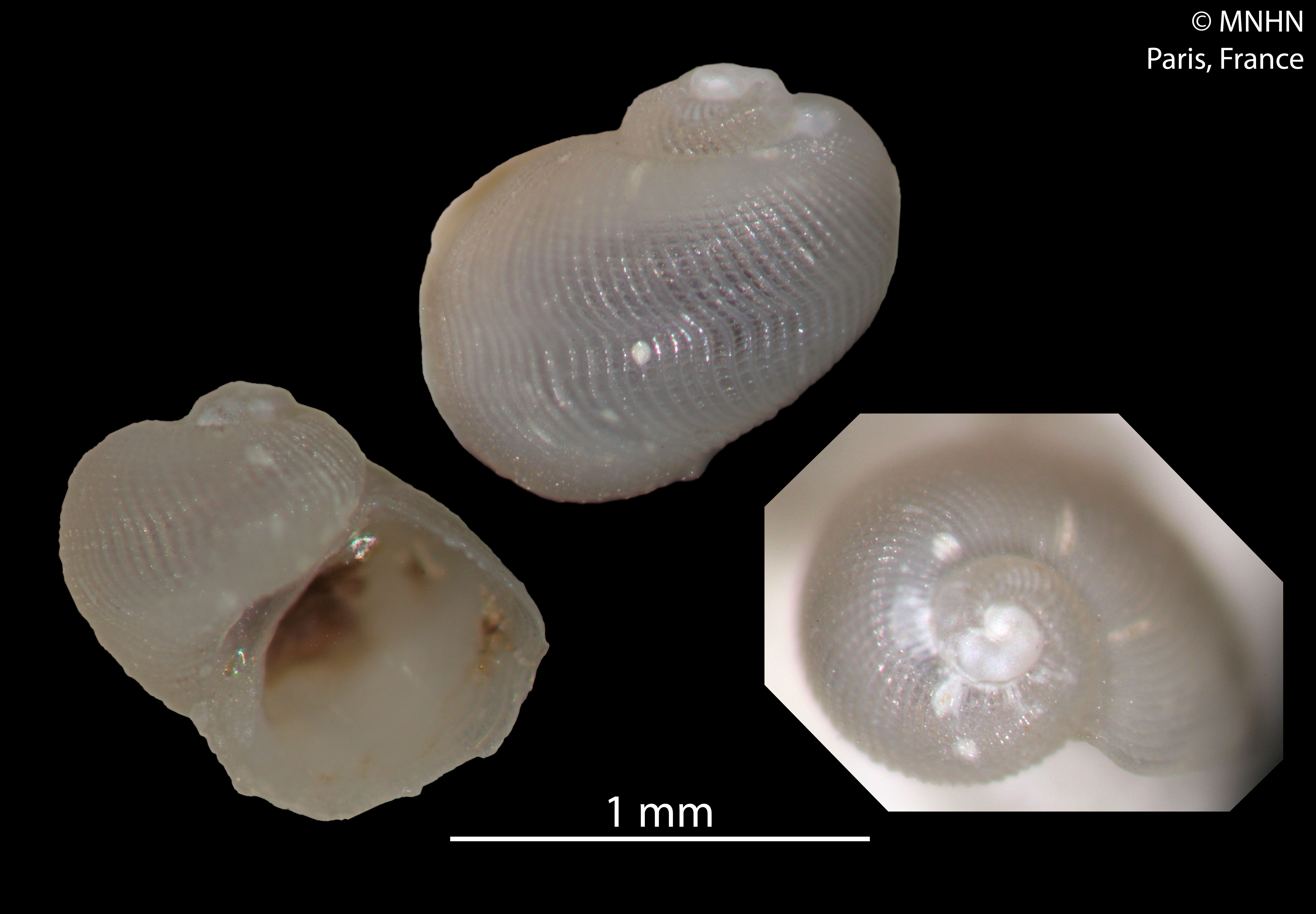
- Bathyxylophila excelsa

Scientific classification
- Kingdom: Animalia
- Phylum: Mollusca
- Class: Gastropoda
- Subclass: Vetigastropoda
- Order: Lepetellida
- Family: Larocheidae
- Genus: Bathyxylophila; B. A. Marshall, 1988

Type species
- Bathyxylophila excelsa B. A. Marshall, 1988

= Bathyxylophila =

Genus of gastropods

Bathyxylophila is a genus of sea snails, marine gastropod mollusks in the family Larocheidae.

== Species ==
Species within the genus Bathyxylophila include:

- Bathyxylophila excelsa B. A. Marshall, 1988
- Bathyxylophila iota B. A. Marshall, 1988
- Bathyxylophila peroniana Marshall, 1988
- Bathyxylophila pusilla B. A. Marshall, 1988
