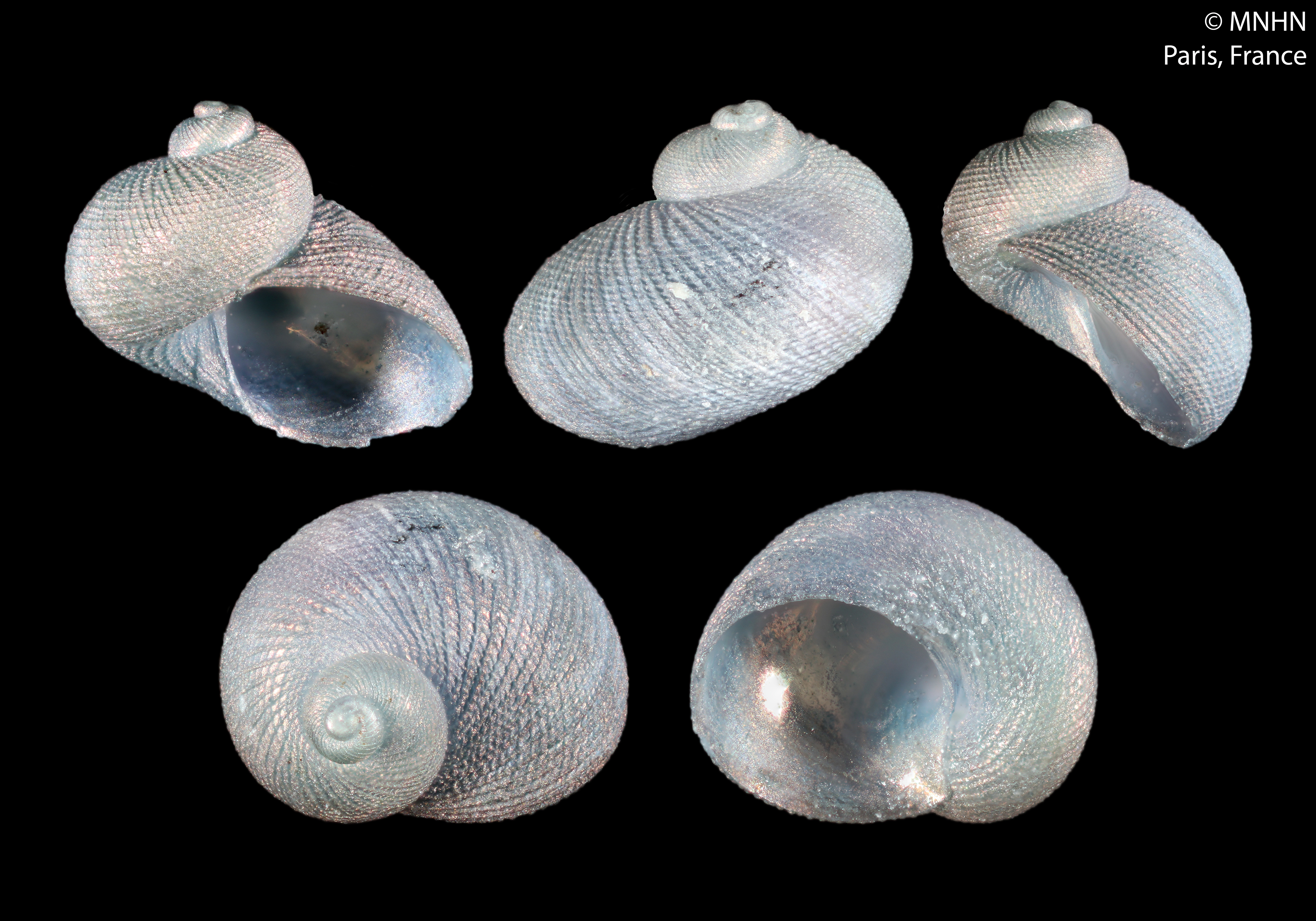
- Trogloconcha lamellinodosa

Scientific classification
- Kingdom: Animalia
- Phylum: Mollusca
- Class: Gastropoda
- Subclass: Vetigastropoda
- Order: Lepetellida
- Superfamily: Scissurelloidea
- Family: Larocheidae; Finlay, 1927

Synonyms
- Larocheinae

= Larocheidae =

Family of gastropods

Larocheidae is a family of small to minute sea snails, marine gastropod molluscs or micromolluscs in the superfamily Scissurelloidea.

== Genera ==
The family Larocheidae contains the following genera:

- Bathyxylophila B. A. Marshall, 1988
- Larochea Finlay, 1927
- Larocheopsis B.A. Marshall, 1993
- Trogloconcha Kase & Kano, 2002
