= L. turritus =

L. turritus may refer to:

- Leucosyrinx turritus, a species of sea snail in the family Pseudomelatomidae
- Lithodes turritus, a species of king crab
- Longchaeus turritus, a species of sea snail in the family Pyramidellidae
