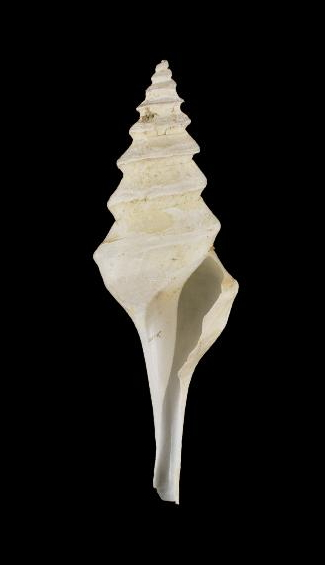
- Shell of Leucosyrinx subgrundifera (specimen at MNHN, Paris)

Scientific classification
- Kingdom: Animalia
- Phylum: Mollusca
- Class: Gastropoda
- Subclass: Caenogastropoda
- Order: Neogastropoda
- Superfamily: Conoidea
- Family: Pseudomelatomidae
- Genus: Leucosyrinx
- Species: L. subgrundifera

Binomial name
- Leucosyrinx subgrundifera (Dall, 1888)

Synonyms
- Pleurotoma (Leucosyrinx) subgrundifera Dall, 1888

= Leucosyrinx subgrundifera =

Species of gastropod

Leucosyrinx subgrundifera is a species of sea snail, a marine gastropod mollusk in the family Pseudomelatomidae, the turrids.

== Description ==
The length of the shell varies between 20 mm and 34 mm.

The sharp keel is bent away from the spire and is bent instead towards the siphonal canal.

== Distribution ==
This marine species occurs off North Carolina to Florida, United States, and off Yucatán, Mexico.
