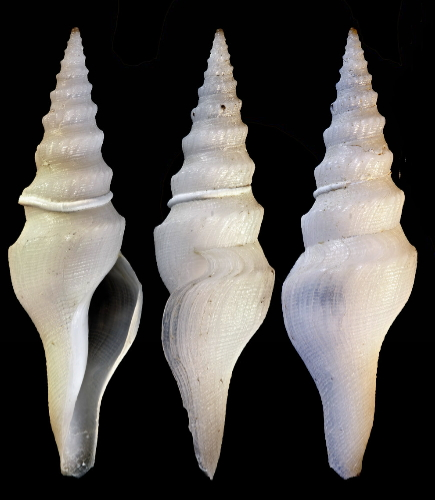
- Shell of Leucosyrinx bernardeti (holotype)

Scientific classification
- Kingdom: Animalia
- Phylum: Mollusca
- Class: Gastropoda
- Subclass: Caenogastropoda
- Order: Neogastropoda
- Superfamily: Conoidea
- Family: Pseudomelatomidae
- Genus: Leucosyrinx
- Species: L. bernardeti

Binomial name
- Leucosyrinx bernardeti Kantor, Fedosov & Puillandre, 2025

= Leucosyrinx bernardeti =

Species of gastropod

Leucosyrinx bernardeti is a species of sea snail, a marine gastropod mollusk in the family Pseudomelatomidae, the turrids and allies.

== Description ==
The length of the shell attains 34.4 mm, its diameter 10.3 mm.

(Original description) The medium-sized shell is thin but rather strong. it is slender, and narrowly fusiform, with a high spire and an off-white coloration. The protoconch is small and paucispiral, consisting of about 1.75 smooth, bulbous, yellow whorls; the transition from protoconch to teleoconch is marked by the onset of the definitive sculpture.

The teleoconch whorls are weakly and obtusely angular at the shoulder, and the subsutural ramp is evenly and moderately concave on all whorls. The suture is distinct and impressed. The last and penultimate whorls bear 26–27 moderately developed, slightly oblique, and closely spaced axial folds on and shortly below the shoulder. These folds do not reach the lower suture on the teleoconch whorls and gradually diminish toward the aperture on the body whorl, although they remain present there.

The spiral sculpture is well developed and consists of narrow, low, rounded, and wavy cords of similar width that cover the entire shell, including the subsutural ramp. Just below the suture there are five slightly broader cords, and on the lower part of the ramp and the shoulder there are four significantly narrower cords. Below the shoulder on the body whorl there are about 55 cords. In most areas the interspaces between the cords are narrower than the cords themselves, although on the shell base and siphonal canal they can exceed the cord width. The shell base is weakly convex and gradually narrows as it passes into a long, broad, and weakly curving siphonal canal. The aperture is narrow and oval and is poorly differentiated from the canal. A well-developed columellar and parietal callus is present and is of the same color as the remainder of the shell. A moderately deep, subsutural, broadly arcuate anal sinus extends across the subsutural ramp and is confluent with the large forward extension of the outer lip.

The radula is very similar. The marginal teeth are duplex and measure approximately 320–465 µm in length, corresponding to 4.6–4.9% of the aperture length excluding the canal. The major limb is moderately broad, lanceolate in dorsal view, and weakly curved. The accessory limb is slender, flattened, and constitutes less than half of the tooth width; it measures about 0.75 of the total tooth length and is inserted into a distinct, deep socket on the dorsal side of the major limb, extending along its entire length.

== Distribution ==
This marine species occurs in the Coral Sea at depths between 603 m and 630 m.
