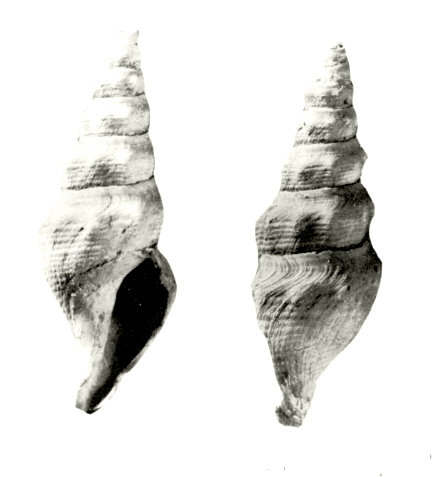
- Original image of a shell of Leucosyrinx fijiensis

Scientific classification
- Kingdom: Animalia
- Phylum: Mollusca
- Class: Gastropoda
- Subclass: Caenogastropoda
- Order: Neogastropoda
- Superfamily: Conoidea
- Family: Pseudomelatomidae
- Genus: Leucosyrinx
- Species: L. fijiensis

Binomial name
- Leucosyrinx fijiensis Ladd, 1982

= Leucosyrinx fijiensis =

Extinct species of gastropod

Leucosyrinx fijiensis is an extinct species of sea snail, a marine gastropod mollusk in the family Pseudomelatomidae, the turrids and allies.

== Description ==
The length of the shell attains 24.4 mm, its diameter 8 mm.

(Original description) The shell is medium in size, slender, fusiform. The protoconch is not preserved. The whorls of the spire show a strong median keel-like projection composed of rounded nodes that are inclined to the right. There are nine nodes on penultimate whorl, nodes becoming inconspicuous on the body whorl. Above the peripheral nodes, the surface is smooth except for faint spiral cords and strongly curved lines marking the anal sinus. Below the nodular periphery are four or five spiral cords. On the body whorl, such cords extend over the entire base. The aperture is lenticular, extended anteriorly as a short siphonal canal.

== Distribution ==
Fossils of this marine species were found in early Miocene strata of Fiji; age range: 23.03 to 15.97 Ma.
