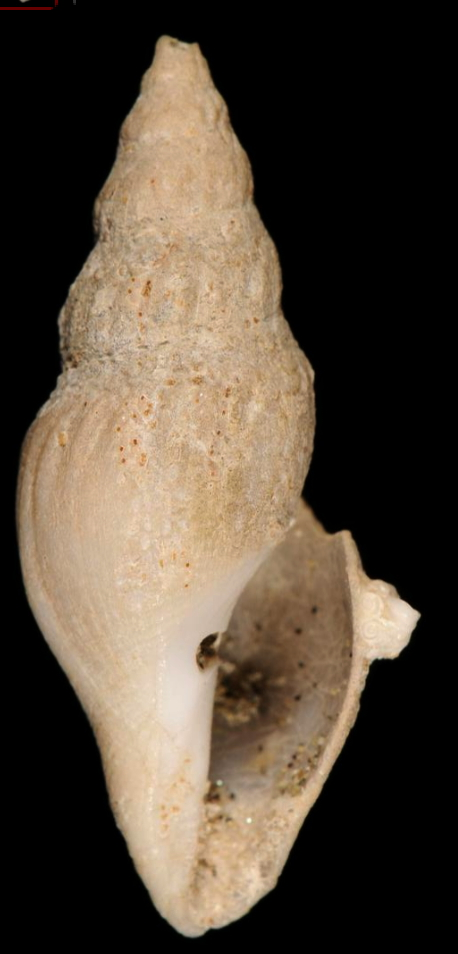
- Shell of Leucosyrinx taludana (specimen at the Smithsonian Institution)

Scientific classification
- Kingdom: Animalia
- Phylum: Mollusca
- Class: Gastropoda
- Subclass: Caenogastropoda
- Order: Neogastropoda
- Superfamily: Conoidea
- Family: Pseudomelatomidae
- Genus: Leucosyrinx
- Species: L. taludana

Binomial name
- Leucosyrinx taludana Castellanos & Landoni, 1993

= Leucosyrinx taludana =

Species of gastropod

Leucosyrinx taludana is a species of sea snail, a marine gastropod mollusk in the family Pseudomelatomidae, the turrids and allies.

== Description ==
The length of the shell attains 23 mm.

== Distribution ==
This marine species occurs off the Falkland Islands, Tierra del Fuego, and Argentina in the South Atlantic Ocean.
