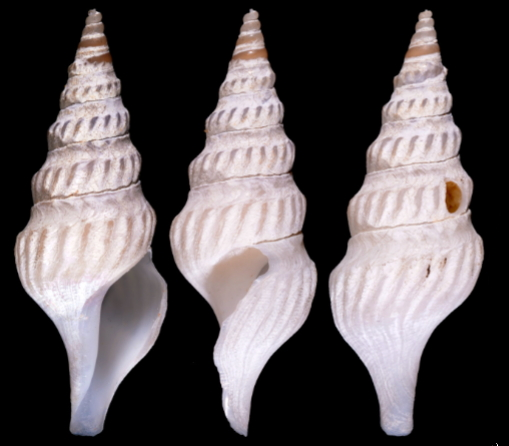
- Shell of Leucosyrinx jeedara (holotype)

Scientific classification
- Kingdom: Animalia
- Phylum: Mollusca
- Class: Gastropoda
- Subclass: Caenogastropoda
- Order: Neogastropoda
- Superfamily: Conoidea
- Family: Pseudomelatomidae
- Genus: Leucosyrinx
- Species: L. jeedara

Binomial name
- Leucosyrinx jeedara Kantor, Hallan & Criscione, 2022

= Leucosyrinx jeedara =

Species of gastropod

Leucosyrinx jeedara is a species of sea snail, a marine gastropod mollusk in the family Pseudomelatomidae, the turrids and allies.

== Description ==
The length of the shell of the holotype attains 33 mm.

The shell is medium-sized, reaching about 33 mm in length.It is broadly fusiform, and characterized by a high spire and a coloration ranging from chalky white to light tan. The protoconch is unknown. The teleoconch whorls are distinctly and roundly angular at the shoulder, and the subsutural ramp is concave on all whorls. A weak subsutural cord is present, and the suture is channeled.

The last and penultimate whorls bear strong, oblique, and slightly sinuous axial folds on and below the shoulder; on the upper whorls these folds reach the lower suture, and on the body whorl they extend to the shell base. There are 19–24 folds on the body whorl and 14–21 on the penultimate whorl. The spiral sculpture is weak to moderately developed and consists of low, rounded cords of similar width that extend over the entire shell, including the subsutural ramp in some specimens, with interspaces narrower than the cords themselves. The shell base is moderately convex and passes rapidly into a medium-long siphonal canal. The aperture is moderately broad, elongate-oval, and well differentiated from the siphonal canal. A well-developed columellar and parietal callus is present and is of the same color as the remaining part of the body whorl. A deep, subsutural, broadly arcuate anal sinus extends across the subsutural ramp and is confluent with the large forward extension of the outer lip.

The radula comprises 33 rows of teeth, of which 4 are nascent. The marginal teeth are duplex and measure approximately 420 µm in length, corresponding to 4.4% of the aperture length excluding the canal. The major limb is narrowly lanceolate in dorsal view and curved. The accessory limb accounts for about half of the tooth width and is inserted into a distinct, moderately deep socket on the dorsal side of the major limb.

== Distribution ==
This marine species occurs in the Great Australian Bight; at depths between 962 m and 1509 m.
