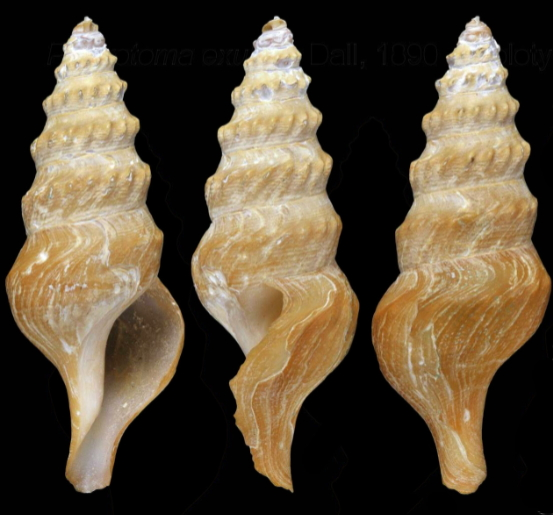
- Shell of Leucosyrinx exulans (holotype)

Scientific classification
- Kingdom: Animalia
- Phylum: Mollusca
- Class: Gastropoda
- Subclass: Caenogastropoda
- Order: Neogastropoda
- Superfamily: Conoidea
- Family: Pseudomelatomidae
- Genus: Leucosyrinx
- Species: L. exulans

Binomial name
- Leucosyrinx exulans (Dall, 1890)

Synonyms
- Pleurotoma exulans Dall, 1890

= Leucosyrinx exulans =

Species of gastropod

Leucosyrinx exulans is a species of sea snail, a marine gastropod mollusk in the family Pseudomelatomidae, the turrids and allies.

== Description ==
The length of the shell attains 32 mm, its diameter 13 mm.

(Original description) The solid shell has a yellowish chocolate-brown color. It is strongly sculptured, with eight or nine whorls. The tip is eroded in all the specimens. The whorls are rounded. The region of the fasciole in front of the closely appressed suture is flattish, constricted, and polished. The transverse sculpture in front of the fasciole (on the penultimate whorl) consists of about fourteen short, stout, obliquely set riblets, which coronate the whorl and do not reach the suture in front. The spiral sculpture consists of rather narrow shallow grooves, separating slightly raised flattish, rather wider, threads. The last are finest on the fasciole and somewhat coarser near the siphonal canal, but tolerably uniform over the entire surface. The notch is rather wide, not very deep, rounded, and halfway between the suture and the posterior ends of the peripheral riblets. The outer lip is thin, simple and produced in the middle. The siphonal canal is rather well defined and not very long. The columella is obliquely trimmed off in front, of a creamy brown, with a thin polished glaze. The axis is not pervious. The siphonal canal is rather deep, flaring a little anteriorly.

(More recent description by Kantor et al.) The shell is medium-sized, reaching 37 mm in the holotype. The shell is fusiform, and thin, with a medium-high spire and a yellowish-brown coloration, the siphonal canal being somewhat lighter. The protoconch and upper teleoconch whorls are eroded in the available material. The teleoconch whorls are roundly angulated at the shoulder; in larger specimens, the body whorl may be almost evenly rounded, with the shoulder only slightly accentuated by an obtuse keel. The subsutural ramp is lightly concave on the upper whorls and may become nearly flat on the last whorl.

The penultimate and body whorls (when preserved) bear 18–19 rather strong, oblique, moderately broad, and rounded axial folds on the shoulder of the teleoconch whorls. These folds fade on the subsutural ramp and do not reach the lower suture; in larger specimens they progressively weaken on the body whorl toward the aperture. The spiral sculpture is distinct and consists of low, rounded, and wavy cords of similar width, with interspaces that do not exceed the width of the cords themselves. The shell base is strongly convex, then rapidly constricts and passes into a long, rather narrow siphonal canal. The aperture is moderately narrow and elongate-oval. A shallow subsutural, broadly arcuate anal sinus extends across the subsutural ramp and is confluent with the large forward extension of the outer lip.

== Distribution ==
This marine species occurs off the Galapagos Islands and New Caledonia at depths between 1160 m and 3014 m.
