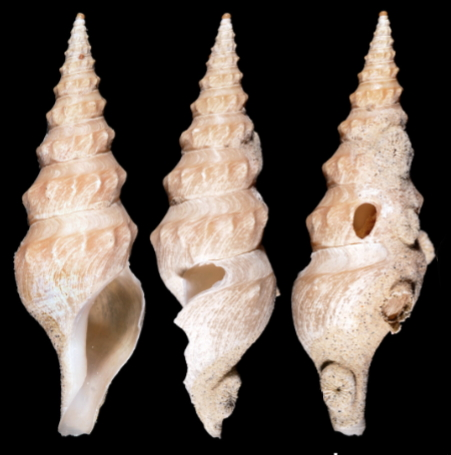
- Shell of Leucosyrinx schepmani (holotype)

Scientific classification
- Kingdom: Animalia
- Phylum: Mollusca
- Class: Gastropoda
- Subclass: Caenogastropoda
- Order: Neogastropoda
- Superfamily: Conoidea
- Family: Pseudomelatomidae
- Genus: Leucosyrinx
- Species: L. schepmani

Binomial name
- Leucosyrinx schepmani Kantor, Fedosov & Puillandre, 2025

= Leucosyrinx schepmani =

Species of gastropod

Leucosyrinx schepmani is a species of sea snail, a marine gastropod mollusk in the family Pseudomelatomidae, the turrids and allies.

== Description ==
(Original description) The length of the shell of the holotype attains 33 mm; its diameter 9.8 mm; aperture length (including siphonal canal) 14.4 mm; aperture length (excluding canal) 10 mm.

The thin shell is medium-sized, elongate-fusiform, and slender, with a high spire and a uniformly light tan coloration. It consists of 9.75 teleoconch whorls that are distinctly and roundly angled at the shoulder and bear a slightly concave, almost straight subsutural ramp. The protoconch is paucispiral, comprising about 1.5 evenly rounded, bulbous whorls of a light brown color. The posterior part of the protoconch and the first teleoconch whorl are eroded, rendering the protoconch–teleoconch transition indistinct. The suture is shallow and impressed.

The shoulder of the body whorl bears 12 distinct, oblique, narrow, and rounded axial folds, and the penultimate whorl bears 12 similar folds. These folds fade out on the subsutural ramp and hardly reach the lower suture on the penultimate whorl, but they are equally pronounced on all teleoconch whorls. The spiral sculpture is very weak and consists of low, rounded, and narrow cords whose interspaces are wider than the cords themselves; this sculpture is absent on the subsutural ramp and is visible only below the shoulder. Numerous thin growth lines are present and are particularly prominent on the subsutural ramp.

The shell base is weakly curved and passes smoothly into a long, straight, and rather broad siphonal canal. The aperture is narrow and elongate-oval and is poorly differentiated from the siphonal canal; the outer lip is fragile and partially broken. The inner lip is slightly concave and nearly straight. The columellar and parietal areas bear a narrow, distinct callus that is of the same color as the remaining part of the body whorl. A moderately deep, subsutural, broadly arcuate anal sinus extends across the subsutural ramp and is confluent with the large forward extension of the outer lip.

== Distribution ==
This marine species occurs off the Philippines, the Solomon Islands and Papua New Guinea at depths between 518 m and 827 m.
