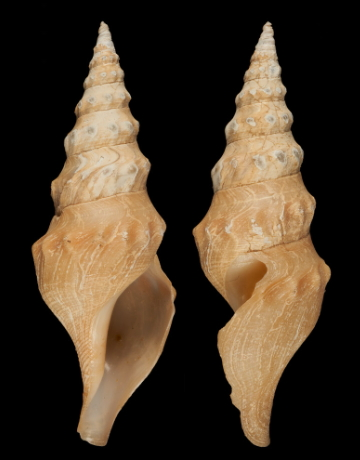
- Shell of Leucosyrinx sansibarica (syntype at Museum für Naturkunde)

Scientific classification
- Kingdom: Animalia
- Phylum: Mollusca
- Class: Gastropoda
- Subclass: Caenogastropoda
- Order: Neogastropoda
- Superfamily: Conoidea
- Family: Pseudomelatomidae
- Genus: Leucosyrinx
- Species: L. sansibarica

Binomial name
- Leucosyrinx sansibarica Thiele, 1925

Synonyms
- Brachytoma griffithii (not Gray, 1833) – sensu von Martens 1904

= Leucosyrinx sansibarica =

Species of gastropod

Leucosyrinx sansibarica is a species of sea snail, a marine gastropod mollusk in the family Pseudomelatomidae, the turrids.

== Distribution ==
This marine species occurs off Tanzania to the Gulf of Aden, at depths between 818 m and 1469 m.
