= Leucosyrinx macrobertsoni =

Scientific classification
- Kingdom: Animalia
- Phylum: Mollusca
- Class: Gastropoda
- Subclass: Caenogastropoda
- Order: Neogastropoda
- Superfamily: Conoidea
- Family: Pseudomelatomidae
- Genus: Leucosyrinx
- Species: L. macrobertsoni

Binomial name
- Leucosyrinx macrobertsoni Powell, 1958

Species of gastropod

Leucosyrinx macrobertsoni is a species of sea snail, a marine gastropod mollusk in the family Pseudomelatomidae, the turrids and allies.

== Distribution ==
This marine species occurs off MacRobertson Land, Antarctica
