= Leucosyrinx nicoya =

Scientific classification
- Kingdom: Animalia
- Phylum: Mollusca
- Class: Gastropoda
- Subclass: Caenogastropoda
- Order: Neogastropoda
- Superfamily: Conoidea
- Family: Pseudomelatomidae
- Genus: Leucosyrinx
- Species: L. nicoya

Binomial name
- Leucosyrinx nicoya Olsson 1942

Extinct species of gastropod

Leucosyrinx nicoya is an extinct species of sea snail, a marine gastropod mollusk in the family Pseudomelatomidae, the turrids and allies.

== Distribution ==
Fossils of this marine species were found in Pliocene strata of the Charco Azul Formation of Costa Rica; age range: 5.332 to 2.588 Ma.
