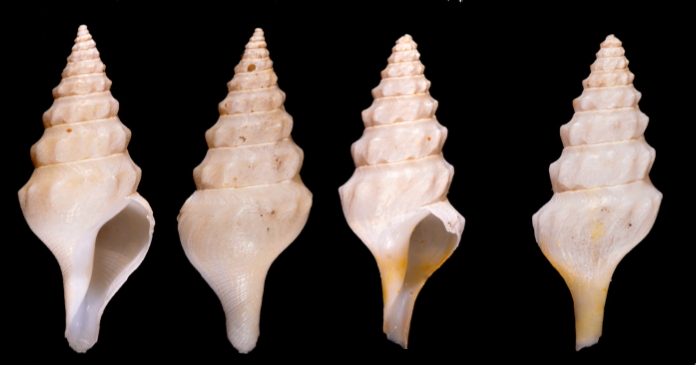
- Shell of Leucosyrinx lemarcisi(holotype)

Scientific classification
- Kingdom: Animalia
- Phylum: Mollusca
- Class: Gastropoda
- Subclass: Caenogastropoda
- Order: Neogastropoda
- Superfamily: Conoidea
- Family: Pseudomelatomidae
- Genus: Leucosyrinx
- Species: L. lemarcisi

Binomial name
- Leucosyrinx lemarcisi Kantor, Fedosov & Puillandre, 2025

= Leucosyrinx lemarcisi =

Species of gastropod

Leucosyrinx lemarcisi is a species of sea snail, a marine gastropod mollusk in the family Pseudomelatomidae, the turrids and allies.

== Description ==
The length of the shell of the holotype attains 26 mm, its diameter 8.06 mm.

(Original description) The shell (holotype) is small, fusiform, and fragile, with a high spire and a uniform light tan coloration. It comprises approximately eight teleoconch whorls. The protoconch is paucispiral, consisting of about two rounded whorls. The transition between the protoconch and the teleoconch is indistinct due to erosion affecting both the protoconch and the earliest teleoconch whorls.

The teleoconch whorls are angular at the shoulder and possess a distinctly concave subsutural ramp. The suture is distinct, shallow, and impressed. The body whorl bears 12 strong, oblique, broad, and rounded axial ribs, while the penultimate whorl bears 14 such ribs. These ribs rapidly fade on the subsutural ramp, become slightly weaker toward the lower suture, and disappear at the periphery of the body whorl. The interspaces between the ribs are slightly broader than the ribs themselves.

The spiral sculpture is weak and consists of low, rounded, and narrow cords distributed over the entire shell surface, including the subsutural ramp, but becoming slightly more pronounced on the shell base and the canal. Numerous thin growth lines are present and are particularly prominent on the subsutural ramp. The shell base is weakly curved and passes smoothly into a long, straight siphonal canal.

The aperture is narrow and elongate-oval, and it is poorly differentiated from the canal. The inner lip is nearly straight. The columellar and parietal areas bear a narrow but distinct callus. A moderately deep, subsutural, broadly arcuate anal sinus extends across the subsutural ramp and is confluent with the pronounced forward extension of the outer lip.

== Distribution ==
This marine species occurs off the Society Islands at depths between 800 m and 1010 m.
