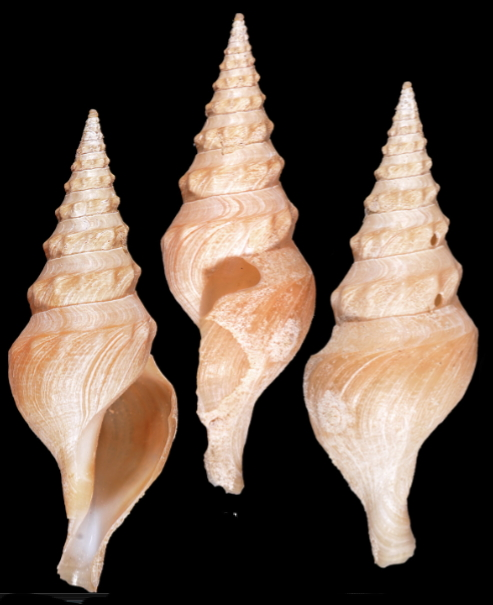
- Shell of Leucosyrinx oliverioi (holotype)

Scientific classification
- Kingdom: Animalia
- Phylum: Mollusca
- Class: Gastropoda
- Subclass: Caenogastropoda
- Order: Neogastropoda
- Superfamily: Conoidea
- Family: Pseudomelatomidae
- Genus: Leucosyrinx
- Species: L. oliverioi

Binomial name
- Leucosyrinx oliverioi Kantor, Fedosov & Puillandre, 2025

= Leucosyrinx oliverioi =

Species of gastropod

Leucosyrinx oliverioi is a species of sea snail, a marine gastropod mollusk in the family Pseudomelatomidae, the turrids and allies.

== Description ==
(Original description) The length of the shell of the holotype attains 37.5 mm; its diameter 12.9 mm; aperture length (including siphonal canal) 18.6 mm; aperture length (excluding canal) 12.8 mm.

The thin shell is medium-sized, broadly fusiform, with a high spire and a uniformly light yellow coloration. It consists of nearly ten teleoconch whorls that are distinctly and roundly angled at the shoulder and bear a slightly concave, nearly straight subsutural ramp. The protoconch is paucispiral, comprising about 1.5 evenly rounded, strongly convex whorls of tan color. The suture is distinct and slightly adpressed.

The shoulder of the penultimate whorl bears 13 distinct, strong, oblique, and rounded axial folds, and the antepenultimate whorl bears 12 similar folds. On the body whorl, the folds are present only on the apertural side and disappear on the dorsal side. These folds fade on the subsutural ramp and hardly reach the lower suture on the penultimate whorl; they are equally pronounced on all teleoconch whorls except the last one.

The spiral sculpture is weak and consists below the shoulder of very weak, low, rounded, and wavy cords whose interspaces are narrower than the cords themselves; it is hardly discernible on the subsutural ramp. Numerous thin growth lines are present and are particularly prominent on the subsutural ramp.

The shell base is moderately curved and passes smoothly into a long, straight, and rather broad siphonal canal. The aperture is narrow and elongate-oval and is poorly differentiated from the canal; the outer lip is fragile and partially broken. The inner lip is slightly concave and nearly straight. The columellar and parietal areas bear a narrow, distinct callus that is of the same color as the remaining part of the body whorl. A moderately deep, subsutural, broadly arcuate anal sinus extends across the subsutural ramp and is confluent with the large forward extension of the outer lip. The radula (Fig. 10A), examined in the holotype, is short and comprises around 30 rows of teeth, of which 8–9 are nascent. The marginal teeth are duplex and measure approximately 470 µm in length, corresponding to 3.7% of the aperture length excluding the canal. The major limb is narrowly lanceolate in dorsal view and curved. The accessory limb is relatively broad, accounts for slightly more than half of the tooth width, measures about 0.8 of the total tooth length, and is inserted into a distinct, deep socket on the dorsal side of the major limb.

== Distribution ==
This marine species occurs off Vanuatu, the Solomon Islands and Papua New Guinea at depths between 490 m and 930 m.
