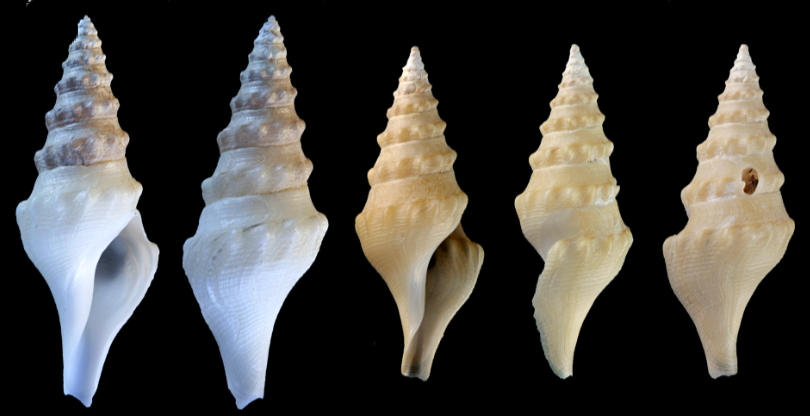
- Shell of Leucosyrinx rattiae (holotype)

Scientific classification
- Kingdom: Animalia
- Phylum: Mollusca
- Class: Gastropoda
- Subclass: Caenogastropoda
- Order: Neogastropoda
- Superfamily: Conoidea
- Family: Pseudomelatomidae
- Genus: Leucosyrinx
- Species: L. rattiae

Binomial name
- Leucosyrinx rattiae Kantor, Fedosov & Puillandre, 2025

= Leucosyrinx rattiae =

Species of gastropod

Leucosyrinx rattiae is a species of sea snail, a marine gastropod mollusk in the family Pseudomelatomidae, the turrids and allies.

== Description ==
(Original description) The length of the shell of the holotype attains 24.9 mm; its diameter 9.7 mm; aperture length (including siphonal canal) 13.0 mm; aperture length (excluding canal) 8.4 mm.

The small shell is fusiform to nearly biconic, fragile, and uniformly light tan in colour, with a moderately high spire. It has approximately eight teleoconch whorls. The protoconch is paucispiral, smooth, and eroded, consisting of fewer than 1.5 whorls. The teleoconch whorls are roundly angulate at the shoulder and possess a distinctly concave subsutural ramp. The suture is distinct, shallow, impressed, and has a slightly undulating margin.

The last and penultimate whorls each bear 15 strong, broad, rounded, oblique axial folds. The folds fade on the sharply delimited subsutural ramp, continue towards the lower suture without noticeable weakening, and disappear at the periphery of the whorl. They remain well developed throughout the teleoconch, and the interspaces are slightly broader than the folds.

The spiral sculpture is moderately to well developed and consists of rounded, narrow, evenly developed spiral cords covering the entire shell, including both the axial folds and the interspaces. The cords are particularly pronounced on the subsutural ramp, where 5–6 cords are present on the last and penultimate whorls. Numerous fine growth lines are present and are especially conspicuous on the subsutural ramp.

The shell base is slightly convex and gently curved, passing smoothly into a moderately long, straight siphonal canal. The aperture is narrow, elongate-oval, and only weakly differentiated from the siphonal canal. The inner lip is nearly straight. The columellar and parietal regions bear a narrow but distinct callus. The anal sinus is moderately deep, subsutural, and broadly arcuate, extending across the subsutural ramp and confluent with the prominent forward projection of the outer lip.

Radula: The marginal teeth are duplex, approximately 230 μm long, relatively short (3.7% of the aperture length excluding the canal), and rather broad. The major limb is broadly lanceolate in dorsal view and distinctly curved. The accessory limb is more than twice as narrow as the major limb, measures approximately 75% of the total tooth length, and is inserted into a distinct, deep socket on the dorsal side of the major limb.

== Distribution ==
This marine species occurs off the Solomon Islands at depths between 1045 m and 1118 m.
