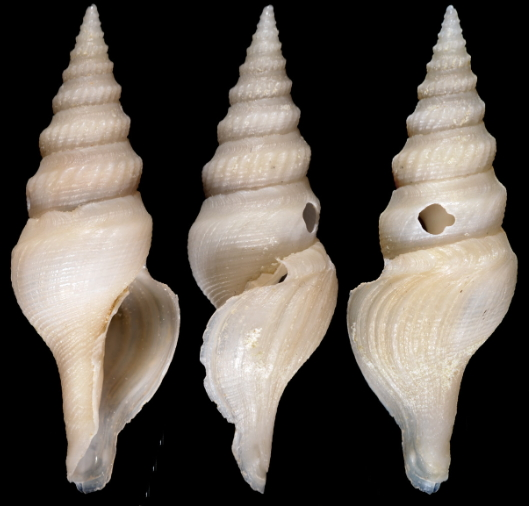
- Shell of Leucosyrinx zahariasi(holotype)

Scientific classification
- Kingdom: Animalia
- Phylum: Mollusca
- Class: Gastropoda
- Subclass: Caenogastropoda
- Order: Neogastropoda
- Superfamily: Conoidea
- Family: Pseudomelatomidae
- Genus: Leucosyrinx
- Species: L. zahariasi

Binomial name
- Leucosyrinx zahariasi Kantor, Fedosov & Puillandre, 2025

= Leucosyrinx zahariasi =

Species of gastropod

Leucosyrinx zahariasi is a species of sea snail, a marine gastropod mollusk in the family Pseudomelatomidae, the turrids and allies.

== Description ==
The length of the shell of the holotype attains 31.3 mm, its diameter 10.4 mm.

(Original description) The thin and fragile shell is medium-sized and moderately broad-fusiform, with a medium-high spire and a very light tan coloration. The protoconch is partially broken in the holotype, but in other specimens it is intact and consists of about 1.75 smooth, glossy, and strongly convex whorls. The transition from protoconch to teleoconch is marked by the onset of the definitive sculpture. The shell bears 8.5 teleoconch whorls; the upper whorls are distinctly and roundly angled at the shoulder, whereas the body whorl is less strongly angled. The subsutural ramp is strongly concave on the upper whorls and nearly flat on the body whorl. The suture is deep and narrowly channeled.

The shoulder of the upper teleoconch whorls carries strong, opisthocline (leans backward relative to the direction of growth), narrow, closely spaced, and rounded axial folds, which fade on the penultimate whorl and are absent on the body whorl. These folds fade on the subsutural ramp and reach the lower suture on the upper teleoconch whorls. Their number increases from 12 on the first teleoconch whorl to 26 on the antepenultimate whorl. On the body whorl, the shoulder is accentuated by an obtuse, low keel.

The spiral sculpture is moderately strong and consists of low, rounded, wavy, and narrow cords that cover the entire shell. On the subsutural ramp, the cords are feeble, but below the shoulder they are distinct; on the shell base and siphonal canal, the intervals between the cords are equal to or slightly narrower than the width of the cords themselves. Numerous thin growth lines are present and are particularly prominent on the subsutural ramp; on the body whorl, some of the growth lines on the subsutural ramp are distinctly thickened. The shell base is lightly convex and passes smoothly into a long, straight siphonal canal. The aperture is narrow and elongate-oval and is poorly differentiated from the siphonal canal. The inner lip is slightly concave and nearly straight. The columellar and parietal areas bear a narrow, distinct callus that is slightly lighter in color than the remainder of the body whorl. A deep, subsutural, broadly arcuate anal sinus extends across the subsutural ramp and is confluent with the large forward extension of the outer lip.

The radula bears duplex marginal teeth measuring approximately 180 µm in length, corresponding to 4.1% of the aperture length excluding the canal. The major limb is lanceolate in dorsal view and curved. The accessory limb is relatively broad, equals the total tooth width at the tooth base, measures about 0.8 of the total tooth length, and is inserted into a distinct though shallow socket on the dorsal side of the major limb.

== Distribution ==
This marine species occurs off Southern New Caledonia at depths between 440 m and 530 m.
