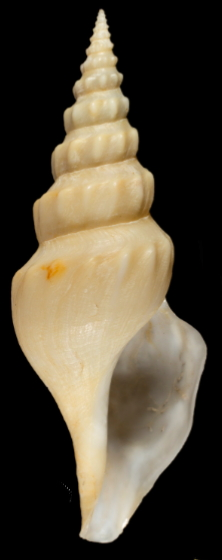
- Shell of Leucosyrinx bolognai (holotype)

Scientific classification
- Kingdom: Animalia
- Phylum: Mollusca
- Class: Gastropoda
- Subclass: Caenogastropoda
- Order: Neogastropoda
- Superfamily: Conoidea
- Family: Pseudomelatomidae
- Genus: Leucosyrinx
- Species: L. bolognai

Binomial name
- Leucosyrinx bolognai (Bozzetti, 2001)

Synonyms
- Comitas bolognai Bozzetti, 2001

= Leucosyrinx bolognai =

Species of gastropod

Leucosyrinx bolognai is a species of sea snail, a marine gastropod mollusk in the family Pseudomelatomidae, the turrids and allies.

== Description ==
The length of the shell attains 90 mm.

(A redescription by Kantor et al.) This is the largest known species of Leucosyrinx, reaching up to 90 mm in length (82.9 mm in the holotype). it is broadly fusiform and strong, with a medium-high spire and a light orange to beige coloration. The protoconch is small, bulbous, and paucispiral, consisting of about 1.75 convex, micro-shagreened whorls that are of the same color as the teleoconch. The transition from protoconch to teleoconch is clearly marked by a thickened growth line and by the appearance of a shoulder keel. In smaller specimens and on the upper teleoconch whorls of the holotype, the teleoconch whorls are obtusely angular at the shoulder. The subsutural ramp is distinctly concave on all whorls, and the suture is distinct and impressed.

The body whorl bears 14–16 strong, slightly oblique axial folds on and below the shoulder. These folds may reach the lower suture on the teleoconch whorls and may extend to the shell base. The interspaces between the folds are similar to or exceed the width of the folds. The spiral sculpture is moderately well developed and consists of very low, rounded cords of varying width and irregular spacing, extending over the entire shell except the subsutural ramp. On the ramp, the cords are either absent or extremely weak and barely discernible. The intervals between the cords range from narrower than the cord width to about twice as broad. The shell base is moderately convex and gradually narrows as it passes into a medium-long, broad, and straight siphonal canal that is slightly inclined leftwards. The aperture is rather broad, elongate-oval to irregular in outline, and poorly differentiated from the siphonal canal. A well-developed white or light yellowish columellar and parietal callus is present. The subsutural anal sinus is shallow and arcuate, extends across the subsutural ramp, and is confluent with the large forward extension of the outer lip.

The radula bears duplex marginal teeth measuring approximately 300 µm in length, corresponding to 2.4% of the aperture length excluding the canal. The major limb is moderately broad, lanceolate in dorsal view, and weakly curved. The accessory limb accounts for about half of the tooth width, measures about 0.75 of the total tooth length, and is inserted into a distinct, deep socket on the dorsal side of the major limb.

== Distribution ==
This marine species occurs off Madagascar at depths between 350 m and 640 m.
