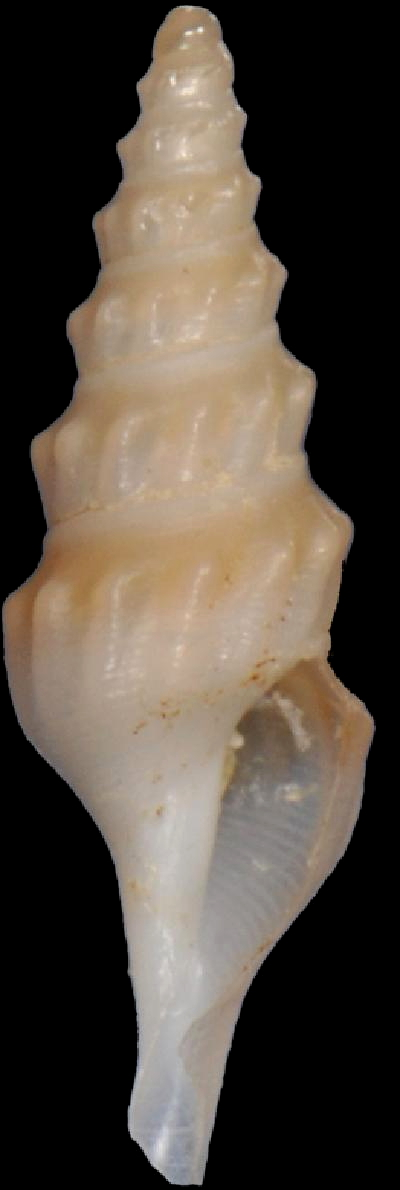
- Shell of Leucosyrinx pelagia (specimen at MNHN, Paris)

Scientific classification
- Kingdom: Animalia
- Phylum: Mollusca
- Class: Gastropoda
- Subclass: Caenogastropoda
- Order: Neogastropoda
- Superfamily: Conoidea
- Family: Pseudomelatomidae
- Genus: Leucosyrinx
- Species: L. pelagia

Binomial name
- Leucosyrinx pelagia (Dall, 1881)

Synonyms
- Mangelia pelagia (Dall, 1881); Pleurotoma (Mangilia) pelagia Dall, 1881 (original combination)

= Leucosyrinx pelagia =

Species of gastropod

Leucosyrinx pelagia is a species of sea snail, a marine gastropod mollusk in the family Pseudomelatomidae, the turrids and allies.

== Description ==
The length of the shell attains 11 mm, its diameter 3.5 mm.

(Original description) The slender, thin shell is white, smooth but not polished. It contains eight whorls. The protoconch is small, the three apical whorls inflated, white, perfectly smooth. The remainder are indistinctly keeled midway between the sutures by a ridge, over which, the lines of growth pass obliquely. The shell is as it were pinched up at regular intervals into oblique projections, ten to fourteen on each whorl, fewer proportionally on the larger whorls. The shell is otherwise not sculptured. The suture is distinct, not appressed. The siphonal canal and aperture are long and narrow. The notch is well marked, but not forming a distinct band.

== Distribution ==
This species occurs off West Florida, United States.
