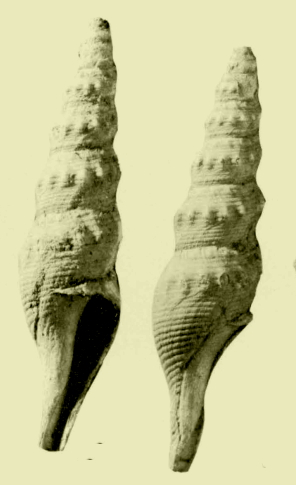
- Original image of a shell of Leucosyrinx rabbidgei

Scientific classification
- Kingdom: Animalia
- Phylum: Mollusca
- Class: Gastropoda
- Subclass: Caenogastropoda
- Order: Neogastropoda
- Superfamily: Conoidea
- Family: Pseudomelatomidae
- Genus: Leucosyrinx
- Species: L. rabbidgei

Binomial name
- Leucosyrinx rabbidgei Ladd, 1982

= Leucosyrinx rabbidgei =

Extinct species of gastropod

Leucosyrinx rabbidgei is an extinct species of sea snail, a marine gastropod mollusk in the family Pseudomelatomidae, the turrids and allies.

== Description ==
The length of the shell attains 22.1 mm. Its diameter reaches 5.6 mm.

(Original description) The small shell is very slender. It has a strongly noded carina lying slightly above the midpoint of each whorl. The protoconch is not known. The spire consists of about seven whorls. The sinus is rounded at the periphery, sweeping forward in a broad curve below before reversing. The sculpture consists of strong peripheral nodes, more than a dozen on the body whorl, that are loosely tied to a row of smaller but well-developed subsutural nodes. The surface of the entire shell is covered by close-set rounded spiral ribs that override the peripheral nodes. The aperture is elongate, extended anteriorly as a narrow siphonal canal. The inner lip is callused, the edge of the callus discrete.

== Distribution ==
Fossils of this marine species were found in early Miocene strata of Fiji.
