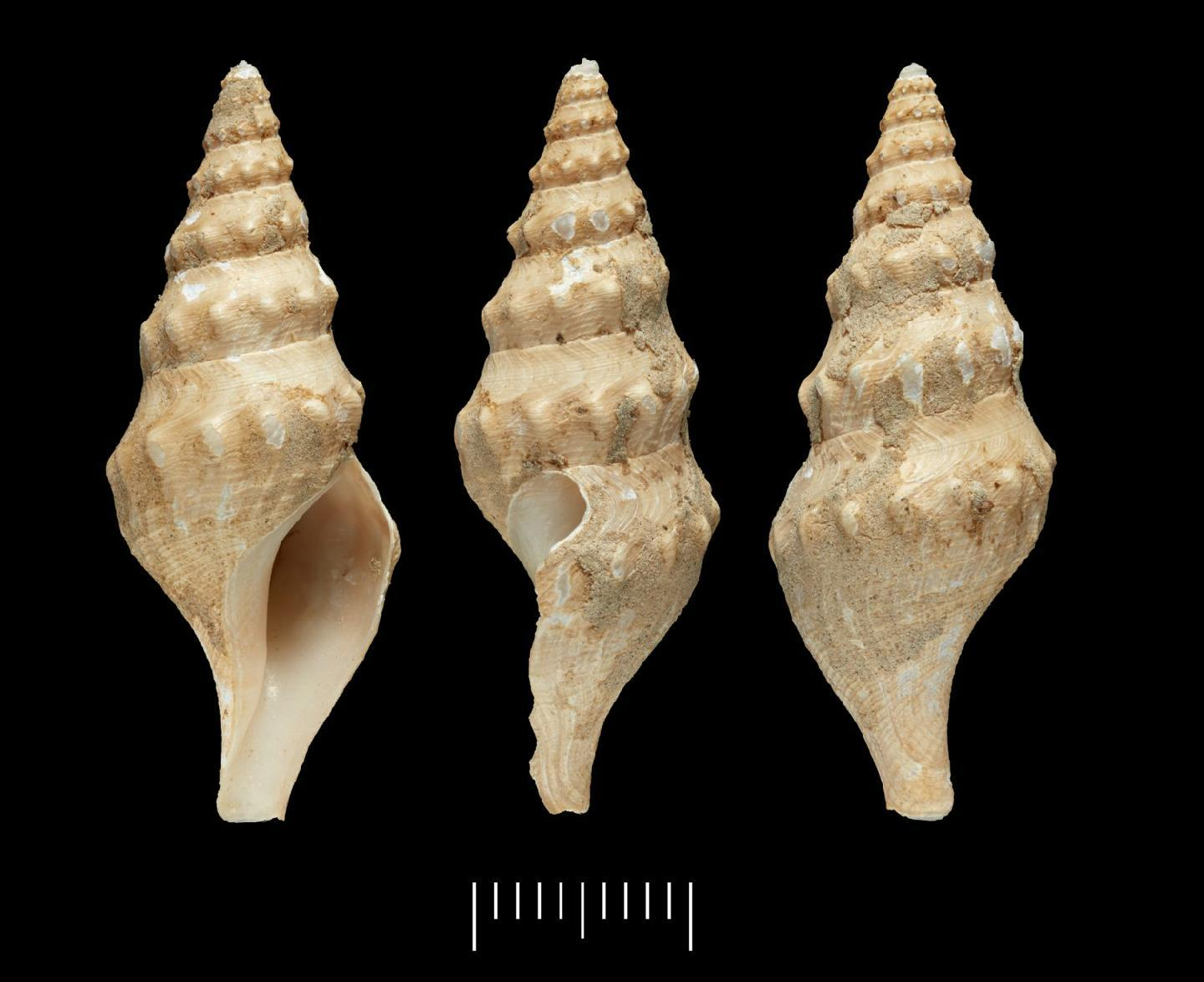
- Shell of Leucosyrinx curviplicata

Scientific classification
- Kingdom: Animalia
- Phylum: Mollusca
- Class: Gastropoda
- Subclass: Caenogastropoda
- Order: Neogastropoda
- Superfamily: Conoidea
- Family: Pseudomelatomidae
- Genus: Leucosyrinx
- Species: L. curviplicata

Binomial name
- Leucosyrinx curviplicata (Sysoev, 1996)

Synonyms
- Comitas curviplicata Sysoev, 1996 superseded combination

= Leucosyrinx curviplicata =

Species of gastropod

Leucosyrinx curviplicata is a species of sea snail, a marine gastropod mollusc in the family Pseudomelatomidae.

== Distribution ==
This marine species is found in the Gulf of Aden at a depth of 1270 m.
