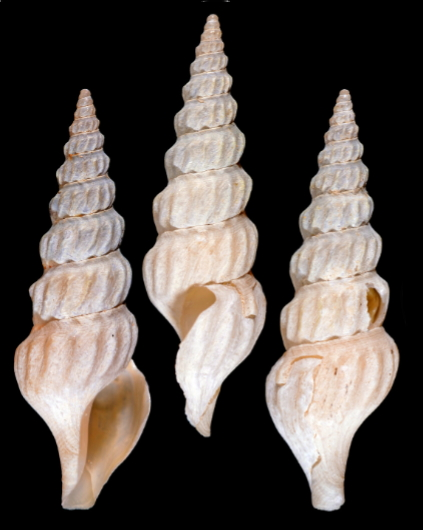
- Shell of Leucosyrinx truwalamuka (holotype)

Scientific classification
- Kingdom: Animalia
- Phylum: Mollusca
- Class: Gastropoda
- Subclass: Caenogastropoda
- Order: Neogastropoda
- Superfamily: Conoidea
- Family: Pseudomelatomidae
- Genus: Leucosyrinx
- Species: L. truwalamuka

Binomial name
- Leucosyrinx truwalamuka Kantor, Hallan & Criscione, 2022

= Leucosyrinx truwalamuka =

Species of gastropod

Leucosyrinx truwalamuka is a species of sea snail, a marine gastropod mollusk in the family Pseudomelatomidae, the turrids and allies.

== Description ==
The length of the shell attains 33.2 mm.

The shell of the holotype is medium-sized, reaching 31 mm in length. It is narrowly fusiform, and is characterized by a very high spire and a light tan coloration. The protoconch is paucispiral and consists of about 1.75 rounded whorls. The teleoconch whorls are convex and bear an indistinct shoulder; the upper whorls are somewhat angular at the shoulder, and the subsutural ramp is weakly concave and nearly flat. The suture is shallow and impressed.

The shoulder and the area below it carry strong, oblique, opisthocline axial folds, 16–17 on the last to antepenultimate whorls; on the upper whorls these folds reach the lower suture, and on the body whorl they extend to the shell base. The spiral sculpture is very weak and consists of low, rounded cords of similar width, which are visible only on some portions of the shell and siphonal canal, but are present on the subsutural ramp. The shell base is moderately convex and passes rapidly into a short, straight siphonal canal. The aperture is narrow and elongate-oval and is poorly differentiated from the siphonal canal. A well-developed columellar and parietal callus is present and is of the same color as the remaining part of the body whorl. A moderately deep, subsutural, broadly arcuate anal sinus extends across the subsutural ramp and is confluent with the large forward extension of the outer lip.

The radula is long and comprises 46 rows of teeth, of which 17 are nascent. The marginal teeth are duplex and measure approximately 230 µm in length, corresponding to 2.6% of the aperture length excluding the canal. The major limb is moderately broad, lanceolate in dorsal view, and curved. The accessory limb accounts for about half of the tooth width and is inserted into a shallow socket on the dorsal side of the major limb.

== Distribution ==
This marine species occurs in the Tasman Sea at depths between 965 m and 1218 m.
