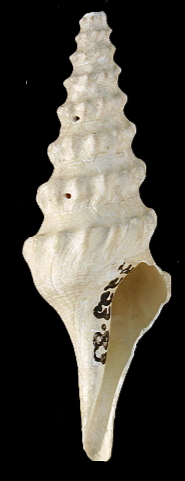
- Shell of Leucosyrinx granuloplicata (holotype)

Scientific classification
- Kingdom: Animalia
- Phylum: Mollusca
- Class: Gastropoda
- Subclass: Caenogastropoda
- Order: Neogastropoda
- Superfamily: Conoidea
- Family: Pseudomelatomidae
- Genus: Leucosyrinx
- Species: L. granuloplicata

Binomial name
- Leucosyrinx granuloplicata (Kosuge, 1992)

Synonyms
- Comitas granuloplicata Kosuge, 1992

= Leucosyrinx granuloplicata =

Species of gastropod

Leucosyrinx granuloplicata is a species of sea snail, a marine gastropod mollusc in the family Pseudomelatomidae, the turrids and allies.

== Description ==
The species was described from two specimens, but only the holotype was illustrated, a dead-collected, heavily worn shell lacking the protoconch and upper teleoconch whorls and measuring 35.3 mm in length. The shell morphology, particularly the shape and position of the subsutural anal sinus, which extends across the subsutural ramp, supports a confident placement of the species in the genus Leucosyrinx.

== Distribution ==
This marine species is endemic to Australia and occurs off Western Australia at depths between 376 m and 494 m.
