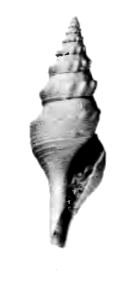
- Original image of a shell of Leucosyrinx iwaensis

Scientific classification
- Kingdom: Animalia
- Phylum: Mollusca
- Class: Gastropoda
- Subclass: Caenogastropoda
- Order: Neogastropoda
- Superfamily: Conoidea
- Family: Pseudomelatomidae
- Genus: Leucosyrinx
- Species: L. iwaensis

Binomial name
- Leucosyrinx iwaensis F.S. MacNeil, 1960

= Leucosyrinx iwaensis =

Extinct species of gastropod

Leucosyrinx iwaensis is an extinct species of sea snail, a marine gastropod mollusk in the family Pseudomelatomidae, the turrids and allies.

== Description ==
The length of the shell attains 25 mm, its diameter 8.3 mm.

(Original description) The shell is of medium size moderately slender. The spire is fusiform. The whorls are subangulate. The protoconch consists of 1½ smooth whorls, the first full turn slightly tilted and moderately small. The aperture is about half as long as shell, moderately narrow. The outer lip is thin and rounded, recurving sharply to the anal sinus. The columella is of moderate length and straight. The anal sinus is moderately broad and deep, adjacent to the suture and showing only a slight amount of recurving from the apex of the sinus to the suture. The sculpture consists of inclined axials, about eight visible from an angle on the young whorls but becoming obsolete on the body whorl. Medium textured raised spiral lines below the periphery, extending with about equal strength to the tip of the columella. The subsutural slope is sculptured with similar lines which are weaker immediately above the periphery, but stronger near the suture.

There seems to be no relative of this species described from the western Pacific region. It differs from the type of Leucosyrinx in being slenderer and having more regular spiral markings, those of L. verrilli being discontinuous near the periphery. The axial nodes of L. verrilli are shorter and somewhat stronger.

== Distribution ==
Fossils of this marine species were found in Miocene strata of Okinawa, Japan.
