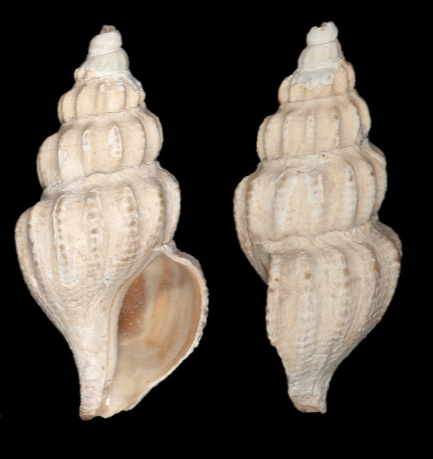
- Shell of Leucosyrinx equatorialis (syntype at the Smithsonian Institution)

Scientific classification
- Kingdom: Animalia
- Phylum: Mollusca
- Class: Gastropoda
- Subclass: Caenogastropoda
- Order: Neogastropoda
- Superfamily: Conoidea
- Family: Pseudomelatomidae
- Genus: Leucosyrinx
- Species: L. equatorialis

Binomial name
- Leucosyrinx equatorialis (Dall, 1919)

Synonyms
- Lora equatorialis Dall, 1919

= Leucosyrinx equatorialis =

Species of gastropod

Leucosyrinx equatorialis is a species of sea snail, a marine gastropod mollusk in the family Pseudomelatomidae, the turrids and allies.

This is a taxon inquirendum.

== Description ==
The length of the shel attains 13.5 mm, its diameter 6 mm.

(Original description) The white shell is rather solid, with about six shouldered whorls. The apex is eroded. The suture is distinct, slightly constricted and appressed. The axial sculpture consists of about 14 rounded ribs nearly reaching the siphonal canal with subequal interspaces. Incremental lines are inconspicuous. The spiral sculpture consists of uniform spiral grooves with wider flattish interspaces, cutting the tops of the ribs. The aperture is short and simple. The inner lip is callous. The short siphonal canal is recurved.

The small shell (13.5 mm in shell length, according to the original description) is characterized by a very short siphonal canal, strong axial ribs extending from the subsutural ramp to the siphonal canal, and an extremely shallow, barely discernible anal sinus. These features actually exclude the species from Leucosyrinx. McLean illustrated the radula of a specimen from the type series, but due to the small size of the photograph, little can be discerned beyond the presence of duplex marginal teeth. This suggests that the species likely belongs to the family Pseudomelatomidae, though its exact generic position is currently unable to be determined.

== Distribution ==
This marine species occurs off Ecuador to Southern Chile
