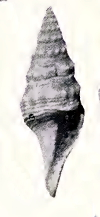
- Original image of a shell of Leucosyrinx chloris

Scientific classification
- Kingdom: Animalia
- Phylum: Mollusca
- Class: Gastropoda
- Subclass: Caenogastropoda
- Order: Neogastropoda
- Superfamily: Conoidea
- Family: Pseudomelatomidae
- Genus: Leucosyrinx
- Species: L. chloris

Binomial name
- Leucosyrinx chloris Olsson 1922

= Leucosyrinx chloris =

Extinct species of gastropod

Leucosyrinx chloris is an extinct species of sea snail, a marine gastropod mollusk in the family Pseudomelatomidae, the turrids and allies.

== Description ==
The length of the shell attains 14.5 mm, its diameter 5.0 mm

(Original description) The subfusiform, thin shell has an acute spire and a long, straight, anterior siphonal canal. The protoconch is small, globular of about 2, smooth, convex whorls. The remaining whorls number about 7. The whorls of the spire are strongly angled in the middle, leaving a wide, concave or sloping zone about the upper suture. The sculpture consists of small, more or less confluent tubercles on the periphery of the whorls and number on the body whorl about 14. In addition, the whole surface is strongly sculptured with raised, subequal, spiral threads. The base of the shell is strongly contracted to the long, straight, anterior canal. The outer lip is broken. The anal sinus, as indicated by the growth lines, lies in the concave zone, close to the upper suture.

== Distribution ==
Fossils of this extinct marine species were found in Miocene strata in northern Costa Rica.
