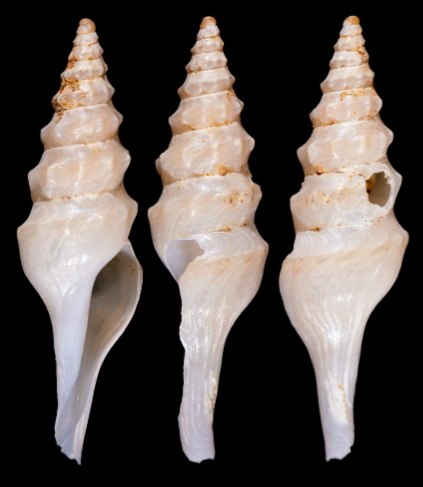
- Shell of Leucosyrinx urbanae(holotype)

Scientific classification
- Kingdom: Animalia
- Phylum: Mollusca
- Class: Gastropoda
- Subclass: Caenogastropoda
- Order: Neogastropoda
- Superfamily: Conoidea
- Family: Pseudomelatomidae
- Genus: Leucosyrinx
- Species: L. urbanae

Binomial name
- Leucosyrinx urbanae Kantor, Fedosov & Puillandre, 2025

= Leucosyrinx urbanae =

Species of gastropod

Leucosyrinx urbanae is a species of sea snail, a marine gastropod mollusk in the family Pseudomelatomidae, the turrids and allies.

== Description ==
The length of the shell of the holotype attains 14.2 mm, its diameter 4 mm.

(Original description) The small shell has a narrow-fusiform shape, with a moderately high spire. It is very light tan in color, thin, semitransparent, and fragile. The teleoconch consists of 7.5 whorls with distinctly angular, rounded shoulders and a weakly concave subsutural ramp. The protoconch is small, paucispiral, and composed of approximately 1.75 evenly convex, rounded whorls, light brownish in color. The protoconch–teleoconch transition is indiscernible owing to shell erosion. The suture is shallow and impressed.

The teleoconch whorls bear strong, oblique, narrow, rounded axial folds on the shoulder, increasing in number from nine on the first teleoconch whorl to 11 on the penultimate and 12 on the body whorl. The folds fade across the subsutural ramp, reach the lower suture on the upper whorls, and disappear below the shoulder on the body whorl. On the posterior half of the body whorl, the folds progressively weaken, although they remain visible.

The spiral sculpture is very weak, being hardly discernible on the subsutural ramp and below the shoulder of the body whorl. It consists of irregularly spaced, low spiral cords that become slightly more pronounced toward the transition to the siphonal canal. Numerous thin growth lines are present and are particularly visible on the subsutural ramp.

The shell base is weakly convex and passes smoothly into a long, straight siphonal canal. The aperture is narrow, elongate-oval, and poorly differentiated from the siphonal canal. The inner lip is nearly straight, whereas the outer lip is very thin and fragile. The columellar and parietal sides are covered by a narrow, distinct callus of the same color as the remainder of the last whorl. The anal sinus is moderately deep, subsutural, and broadly arcuate, extending across the subsutural ramp and becoming confluent with the broad forward projection of the outer lip.

The radula bears duplex marginal teeth approximately 190 μm in length (5.1% of aperture length excluding the siphonal canal). The major limb is lanceolate in dorsal view and distinctly curved. The accessory limb is relatively broad, its width at the tooth base equaling the total tooth width. It measures approximately three-quarters of the total tooth length and is inserted into a distinct, deep socket on the dorsal side of the major limb.

== Distribution ==
This marine species occurs off Papua New Guinea and the Solomon Islands at depths between 499 m and 556 m.
