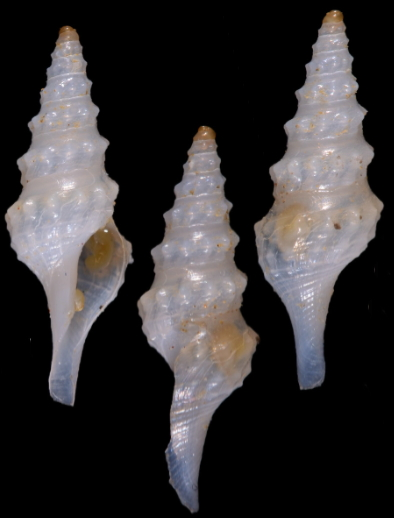
- Shell of Leucosyrinx nodulocordata (holotype)

Scientific classification
- Kingdom: Animalia
- Phylum: Mollusca
- Class: Gastropoda
- Subclass: Caenogastropoda
- Order: Neogastropoda
- Superfamily: Conoidea
- Family: Pseudomelatomidae
- Genus: Leucosyrinx
- Species: L. nodulocordata

Binomial name
- Leucosyrinx nodulocordata Kantor, Fedosov & Puillandre, 2025

= Leucosyrinx nodulocordata =

Species of gastropod

Leucosyrinx nodulocordata is a species of sea snail, a marine gastropod mollusk in the family Pseudomelatomidae, the turrids and allies.

== Description ==
The length of the shell attains 10.4 mm, its diameter 3.6 mm.

(Original description) The small and slender shell is narrowly fusiform, with a medium-high spire. It is off-white, thin, translucent, and fragile. The protoconch is small and paucispiral, consisting of about 1.5 smooth, micro-shagreened yellow whorls. The transition from protoconch to teleoconch is marked by the appearance of the anal sinus and an obtuse medial keel, which corresponds to the shoulder on the subsequent whorls. There are six teleoconch whorls that are distinctly angular at the shoulder, and the subsutural ramp is evenly and moderately concave on all whorls. The suture is distinct and shallowly impressed.

The last and penultimate whorls bear 13 and 12 strong, slightly oblique axial folds, respectively, present on and below the shoulder and reaching the lower suture on the teleoconch whorls.

The spiral sculpture consists of a few rather strong cords below the shoulder: one immediately below the shoulder crosses the axial folds, and beneath it there are two similarly strong, narrow cords with interspaces four to five times wider than the cords themselves, forming oval nodules at their intersections with the lower parts of the axial folds. Between these cords, the axial folds are not pronounced. On the shell base and siphonal canal, there are about 15 more closely spaced cords, with interspaces one to two times the cord width; the cords have the same width as the nodulated ones. The subsutural ramp is smooth.

The shell base is weakly convex and passes gradually into a long, weakly curving siphonal canal. The aperture is narrow-oval and poorly differentiated from the siphonal canal. The columellar and parietal callus is thin and of the same color as the rest of the shell. A moderately deep, subsutural, broadly arcuate anal sinus extends across the subsutural ramp and is confluent with the large forward extension of the outer lip. The operculum is narrow and leaf-shaped, with a terminal nucleus.

The radula is typical of the genus. The marginal teeth are duplex and measure approximately 150 µm in length, corresponding to 5.5% of the aperture length excluding the canal.

== Distribution ==
This marine species occurs off the Solomon Islands to the Philippines at depths between 356 m and 620 m.
