= Leucosyrinx bolbodes =

Scientific classification
- Kingdom: Animalia
- Phylum: Mollusca
- Class: Gastropoda
- Subclass: Caenogastropoda
- Order: Neogastropoda
- Superfamily: Conoidea
- Family: Pseudomelatomidae
- Genus: Leucosyrinx
- Species: L. bolbodes

Binomial name
- Leucosyrinx bolbodes (Watson, 1881)

Synonyms
- Pleurotoma (Surcula) bolbodes Watson, 1881

Species of gastropod

Leucosyrinx bolbodes is a species of sea snail, a marine gastropod mollusk in the family Pseudomelatomidae, the turrids and allies.

== Description ==
The length of the shell attains 8.1 mm.

== Distribution ==
This species occurs in the Atlantic Ocean off Northeast Brazil.
