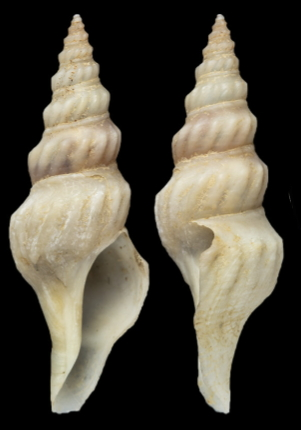
- Shell of Leucosyrinx halicyria

Scientific classification
- Kingdom: Animalia
- Phylum: Mollusca
- Class: Gastropoda
- Subclass: Caenogastropoda
- Order: Neogastropoda
- Superfamily: Conoidea
- Family: Pseudomelatomidae
- Genus: Leucosyrinx
- Species: L. halicyria

Binomial name
- Leucosyrinx halicyria (Melvill, 1904)

Synonyms
- Comitas halicyria (Melvill, 1904); Pleurotoma (Surcula) halicyria Melvill, 1904 (original combination); Surcula halicyria (Melvill, 1904)

= Leucosyrinx halicyria =

Species of gastropod

Leucosyrinx halicyria is a species of sea snail, a marine gastropod mollusc in the family Pseudomelatomidae, the turrids and allies.

== Description ==
The length of the shell attains 32 mm, its diameter 10 mm.

The tender, dark white shell has a fusiform shape and is almost transparent. The shell contains 9 whorls, of which 1½ smooth, globose and vitreous whorls in the protoconch. The whorls are impressed at the suture. They are generally smooth, polished and strongly angulate in the middle. They are longitudinally obliquely ribbed. These 15 ribs vanish entirely when crossing the suture and also on the body whorl from the periphery to the base of the shell. The body whorl and the penultimate whorl are crossed by inconspicuous lirae. The aperture is oblong and contracted below. The outer lip is very slender and round in the middle The white, shining columella has a slight callus. The siphonal canal is produced and wide.

== Distribution ==
This species occurs in the Gulf of Oman at a depths of 411 m.
