= Leucosyrinx barashi =

Scientific classification
- Kingdom: Animalia
- Phylum: Mollusca
- Class: Gastropoda
- Subclass: Caenogastropoda
- Order: Neogastropoda
- Superfamily: Conoidea
- Family: Pseudomelatomidae
- Genus: Leucosyrinx
- Species: L. barashi

Binomial name
- Leucosyrinx barashi Nordsieck, 1982

Species of gastropod

Leucosyrinx barashi is a species of sea snail, a marine gastropod mollusk in the family Pseudomelatomidae, the turrids and allies.

This is a taxon inquirendum.

== Distribution ==
This species occurs in the Mediterranean Sea off Israel.
