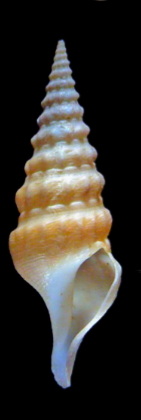
- Shell of Leucosyrinx madagascariensis (holotype)

Scientific classification
- Kingdom: Animalia
- Phylum: Mollusca
- Class: Gastropoda
- Subclass: Caenogastropoda
- Order: Neogastropoda
- Superfamily: Conoidea
- Family: Pseudomelatomidae
- Genus: Leucosyrinx
- Species: L. madagascariensis

Binomial name
- Leucosyrinx madagascariensis Ardovini, 2022

= Leucosyrinx madagascariensis =

Species of gastropod

Leucosyrinx madagascariensis is a species of sea snail, a marine gastropod mollusk in the family Pseudomelatomidae, the turrids and allies.

== Description ==
The shell is large and reaches 50.6 mm in length. it is strong and narrowly to moderately broad fusiform, with a high spire and a light orange coloration. The protoconch is small, bulbous, and paucispiral. The teleoconch whorls are distinctly and obtusely angular at the shoulder, and the subsutural ramp is distinctly concave on all whorls, varying from narrow to moderately broad. The suture is distinct and impressed.

The body whorl bears 19–21 strong, slightly oblique to nearly orthocline (running perfectly straight, at a 90° angle (perpendicular) to the shell's axis) axial folds on and below the shoulder, while the penultimate whorl bears 16–20 folds. These folds reach the lower suture on the teleoconch whorls and disappear shortly below the shoulder on the body whorl. The interspaces between the folds are narrower than the folds themselves.

The spiral sculpture is very distinct and consists of closely spaced, rounded cords of similar width that extend over the entire shell. On the subsutural ramp, the cords are weaker than on and below the shoulder. The intervals between the cords are usually about half the cord width and only rarely equal to it. On the body whorl, there are about 30 cords on and below the shoulder.

The shell base is strongly convex and rapidly narrows as it passes into a medium-long, rather narrow siphonal canal that is slightly inclined leftwards. The aperture is rather broad, elongate-oval, and well differentiated from the siphonal canal. A well-developed, white to light yellowish columellar and parietal callus is present. A moderately deep, subsutural, arcuate anal sinus extends across the subsutural ramp and is confluent with the large forward extension of the outer lip.

The radula shows about 25 rows of teeth, of which 11 are nascent. The marginal teeth are duplex and measure approximately 360 µm in length, corresponding to 2.2% of the aperture length excluding the canal. The major limb is moderately broad, lanceolate, and strongly curved. The accessory limb is about half as broad as the major limb, measures roughly 0.7 of the total tooth length, and is inserted into a deep, distinct socket on the dorsal side of the major limb.

== Distribution ==
This marine species occurs off Madagascar at depths between 600 m and 700 m.
