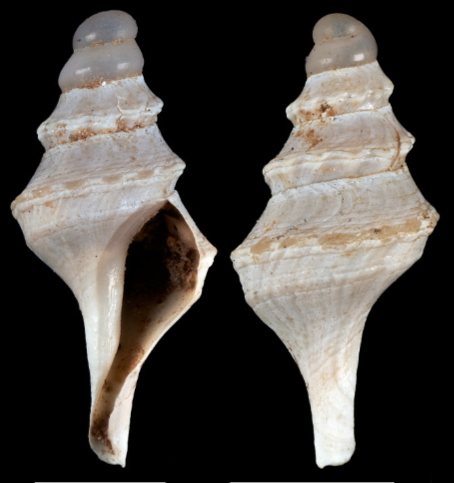
- Shell of Leucosyrinx caecilia (holotype at the Museum für Naturkunde)

Scientific classification
- Kingdom: Animalia
- Phylum: Mollusca
- Class: Gastropoda
- Subclass: Caenogastropoda
- Order: Neogastropoda
- Superfamily: Conoidea
- Family: Pseudomelatomidae
- Genus: Leucosyrinx
- Species: L. caecilia

Binomial name
- Leucosyrinx caecilia Thiele, 1925

= Leucosyrinx caecilia =

Species of gastropod

Leucosyrinx caecilia is a species of sea snail, a marine gastropod mollusk in the family Pseudomelatomidae, the turrids and allies.

== Description ==
The single known specimen is the juvenile holotype, with length of 7.5 mm. The anal sinus is typical of Leucosyrinx, but the shoulder is accentuated by two distinct and broad spiral cords that appear wavy on poorly pronounced axial folds. This type of sculpture is not found in other species of the genus, but it is unclear whether these features are characteristics of the juvenile shell or of the species as a whole. Therefore, the species is tentatively retained within Leucosyrinx, though with some reservations.

== Distribution ==
They are known from the coast of Tanzania.
