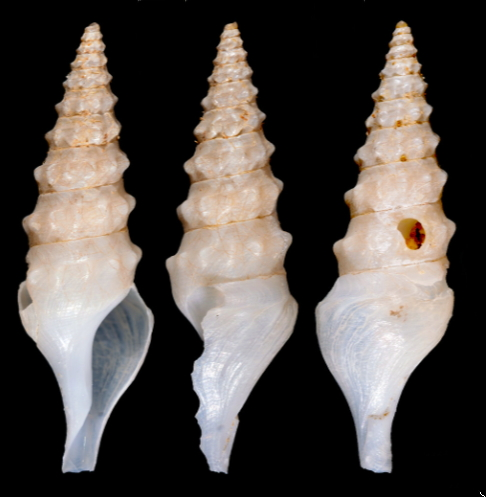
- Shell of Leucosyrinx gaelae(holotype)

Scientific classification
- Kingdom: Animalia
- Phylum: Mollusca
- Class: Gastropoda
- Subclass: Caenogastropoda
- Order: Neogastropoda
- Superfamily: Conoidea
- Family: Pseudomelatomidae
- Genus: Leucosyrinx
- Species: L. gaelae

Binomial name
- Leucosyrinx gaelae Kantor, Fedosov & Puillandre, 2025

= Leucosyrinx gaelae =

Species of gastropod

Leucosyrinx gaelae is a species of sea snail, a marine gastropod mollusk in the family Pseudomelatomidae, the turrids and allies.

== Description ==
The length of the shell of the holotype attains 21.9 mm, its diameter 6.4 mm.

(Original description) The small shell is narrow, fusiform and with a high spire. It is very light tan in color, thin, semitransparent, and fragile. The teleoconch consists of 8.5 distinctly and roundly angulated whorls at the shoulder. The upper part of the protoconch is missing. The subsutural ramp is weakly concave on the upper whorls and nearly straight on the penultimate and last whorls. The suture is shallow and impressed.

The teleoconch whorls bear strong, oblique, broad, rounded axial folds on the shoulder, forming nearly orthocline knobs. These folds increase in number from 9–10 on the first teleoconch whorl to 12 on the penultimate and last whorls. They fade across the subsutural ramp, do not reach the lower suture, and disappear below the shoulder on the body whorl.

The spiral sculpture is weak and barely discernible, consisting of closely spaced, low, rounded cords covering the entire shell except for the subsutural ramp. The intervals between the cords are narrower than the width of the cords themselves. Numerous thin growth lines are visible, including on the subsutural ramp.

The shell base is weakly convex and passes smoothly into a long, straight siphonal canal. The aperture is narrow, elongate-oval, and poorly differentiated from the siphonal canal. The outer lip is very thin, fragile, and partially broken, whereas the inner lip is nearly straight. The columellar and parietal sides are covered by a narrow, distinct callus of the same color as the remainder of the body whorl.

The anal sinus is moderately deep, subsutural, and broadly arcuate. It extends across the subsutural ramp and is confluent with the broad forward projection of the outer lip.

== Distribution ==
This marine species occurs off Papua New Guinea at depths between 702 m and 788 m.
