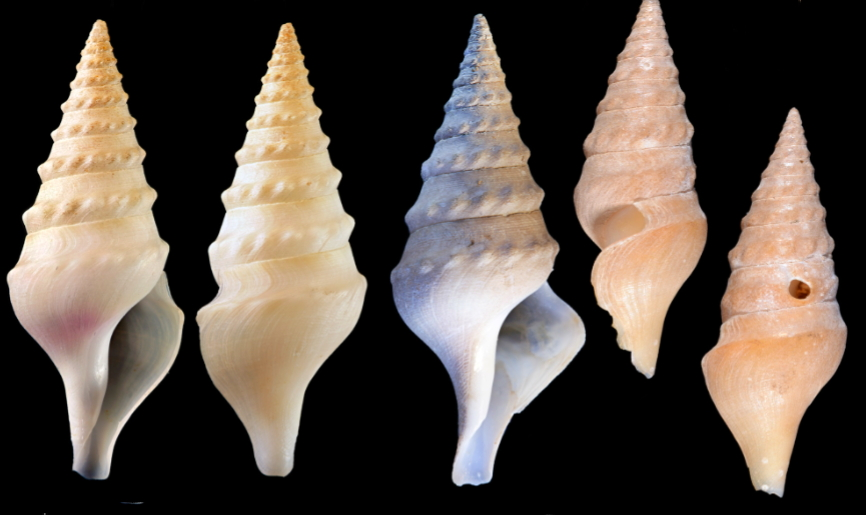
- Shell of Leucosyrinx farhatorum (holotype)

Scientific classification
- Kingdom: Animalia
- Phylum: Mollusca
- Class: Gastropoda
- Subclass: Caenogastropoda
- Order: Neogastropoda
- Superfamily: Conoidea
- Family: Pseudomelatomidae
- Genus: Leucosyrinx
- Species: L. farhatorum

Binomial name
- Leucosyrinx farhatorum Kantor, Fedosov & Puillandre, 2025

= Leucosyrinx farhatorum =

Species of gastropod

Leucosyrinx farhatorum is a species of sea snail, a marine gastropod mollusk in the family Pseudomelatomidae, the turrids and allies.

== Description ==
The length of the shell of the holotype attains 41.2 mm, its diameter 12.7 mm.

(Original description) The shell (holotype) is medium-sized, fusiform, and fragile, with a high spire and a uniform light tan coloration. It comprises more than eleven teleoconch whorls, although the uppermost whorls and the protoconch are missing.

The teleoconch whorls are roundly angled at the shoulder and possess a flat subsutural ramp. The suture is shallow but distinct, narrowly canaliculate, and slightly undulating. The body whorl bears 16 strong, oblique, moderately broad, and rounded axial folds, while the penultimate whorl bears 17 such folds. These folds fade on the subsutural ramp, become slightly weaker toward the lower suture, and disappear slightly above the periphery of the body whorl. On the upper teleoconch whorls, the folds are more closely spaced and more distinct, whereas on the posterior part of the body whorl they weaken and nearly disappear.

The spiral sculpture is weak and consists of low, rounded, narrow, and indistinct cords distributed over the entire shell surface. On the subsutural ramp, there are 12–13 cords on the body whorl and about 10 on the penultimate whorl. Numerous thin growth lines are present and are also prominent on the subsutural ramp. The shell base is weakly and evenly convex and passes smoothly into a long, straight siphonal canal.

The aperture is narrow and elongate-oval and is poorly differentiated from the canal. The inner lip is slightly convex. The columellar and parietal areas bear a narrow but distinct callus. A moderately deep, subsutural, broadly arcuate anal sinus extends across the subsutural ramp and is confluent with the pronounced forward extension of the outer lip.

The radula, examined in two specimens shows similar tooth morphology in both. In the holotype, the radula is short and comprises 25 rows of teeth, of which 8–10 are nascent. The marginal teeth are duplex, short, and broad, measuring approximately 215 µm in length (1.6% of the aperture length excluding the canal). The major limb is broadly lanceolate and slightly curved. The accessory limb is nearly twice as narrow, relatively flat, and about 0.8 of the total tooth length, and it is inserted into a shallow but distinct socket on the dorsal side of the major limb. The radula of the second specimen is very similar but bears even smaller marginal teeth, measuring approximately 150 µm in length (1.9% of the aperture length excluding the canal).

== Distribution ==
This marine species occurs off the Solomon Islands and Vanuatu at depths between 637 m and 646 m.
