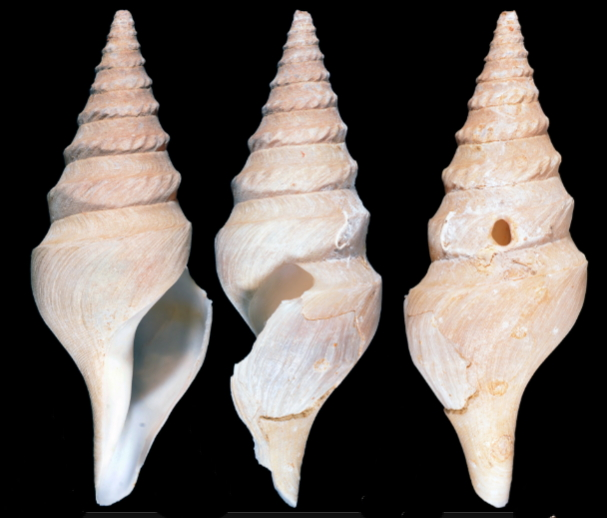
- Shell of Leucosyrinx zucconi (holotype)

Scientific classification
- Kingdom: Animalia
- Phylum: Mollusca
- Class: Gastropoda
- Subclass: Caenogastropoda
- Order: Neogastropoda
- Superfamily: Conoidea
- Family: Pseudomelatomidae
- Genus: Leucosyrinx
- Species: L. zucconi

Binomial name
- Leucosyrinx zucconi Kantor, Fedosov & Puillandre, 2025

= Leucosyrinx zucconi =

Species of gastropod

Leucosyrinx zucconi is a species of sea snail, a marine gastropod mollusk in the family Pseudomelatomidae, the turrids and allies.

== Description ==
The length of the shell of the holotype attains 71.9 mm, its diameter 25.4 mm.

(Original description) The shell (holotype) is large, fusiform, and robust, with a high spire and a uniform greyish coloration. It is covered by a very thin, greyish, tightly adhering, and smooth periostracum. The shell comprises more than nine teleoconch whorls, although the uppermost whorls and the protoconch are missing.

The teleoconch whorls are distinctly angled at the shoulder and exhibit a weakly concave subsutural ramp. The suture is shallow but distinct, impressed, and slightly undulating. All teleoconch whorls except the last bear strong, oblique, moderately broad, and rounded axial folds. These folds are absent on the subsutural ramp and become slightly weaker toward the lower suture; there are 23 folds on both the penultimate and antepenultimate whorls. The folds fade at the transition between the penultimate and the body whorl. The shoulder of the body whorl is distinctly angulated.

The spiral sculpture consists of low, very narrow, but distinct and strongly undulating cords distributed over the entire shell surface. On the subsutural ramp, there are 18 cords on the body whorl and 20 on the penultimate whorl. Numerous thin growth lines are present and are also prominent on the subsutural ramp. The shell base is weakly and evenly convex and passes smoothly into a long, straight siphonal canal.

The aperture is narrow and elongate-oval and is poorly differentiated from the canal. The inner lip is slightly convex and nearly straight. The columellar and parietal areas bear a narrow but distinct callus. A moderately deep, subsutural, broadly arcuate anal sinus extends across the subsutural ramp and is confluent with the pronounced forward extension of the outer lip.

The radula, examined in the holotype, bears duplex marginal teeth measuring approximately 450 µm in length and relatively short, corresponding to 1.95% of the aperture length excluding the canal; they are of moderate breadth. The major limb is lanceolate in strict dorsal view and slightly curved. The accessory limb is more than twice as narrow, about 0.8 of the total tooth length, and is inserted into a distinct and rather deep socket on the dorsal side of the major limb.

== Distribution ==
This marine species occurs off the Solomon Islands at depths between 645 m and 1059 m.
