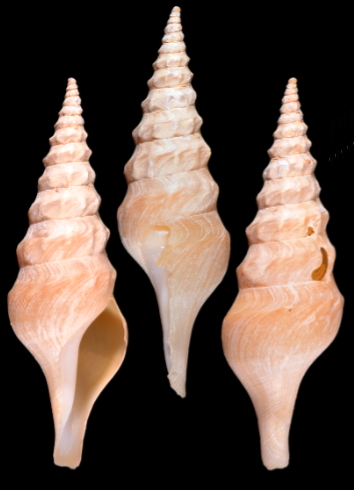
- Shell of Leucosyrinx legalli (holotype)

Scientific classification
- Kingdom: Animalia
- Phylum: Mollusca
- Class: Gastropoda
- Subclass: Caenogastropoda
- Order: Neogastropoda
- Superfamily: Conoidea
- Family: Pseudomelatomidae
- Genus: Leucosyrinx
- Species: L. legalli

Binomial name
- Leucosyrinx legalli Kantor, Fedosov & Puillandre, 2025

= Leucosyrinx legalli =

Species of gastropod

Leucosyrinx legalli is a species of sea snail, a marine gastropod mollusk in the family Pseudomelatomidae, the turrids and allies.

== Description ==
(Original description) The length of the shell of the holotype attains 30.2 mm; its diameter 9 mm; aperture length (including siphonal canal) 14.1 mm; aperture length (excluding canal) 8.5 mm.

The shell (holotype) is medium-sized, thin, fusiform, and slender, with a high spire and a uniformly light tan coloration. It consists of 9.75 teleoconch whorls that are weakly and roundly angled at the shoulder and bear a slightly concave subsutural ramp. The protoconch is paucispiral, comprising about 1.5 evenly rounded whorls, but both the protoconch and the first teleoconch whorls are eroded, rendering the protoconch–teleoconch transition indistinct. The suture is very shallow, impressed, and slightly undulating.

The shoulder of the body whorl bears 13 weak, oblique, narrow, and rounded axial folds, and the penultimate whorl bears 13 similar folds. These folds fade out on the subsutural ramp, barely reach the lower suture on the penultimate whorl, and are hardly discernible below the shoulder on the body whorl. On the upper teleoconch whorls, the folds are more pronounced and more closely spaced, with interspaces of about the same width as the folds; on the penultimate and last whorls, the interspaces are about twice as broad as the folds.

The spiral sculpture is moderately distinct and consists of low, rounded, and narrow cords that extend over the entire shell surface. There are 6–7 such cords on the subsutural ramp of both the last and the penultimate whorls, whereas on the upper whorls the subsutural ramp is smooth. Numerous thin growth lines are present and are particularly prominent on the subsutural ramp. The shell base is weakly curved and passes smoothly into a long, straight, and rather broad siphonal canal. The aperture is narrow and elongate-oval and is poorly differentiated from the siphonal canal; the outer lip is broken. The inner lip is slightly convex. The columellar and parietal areas bear a narrow, distinct callus that is slightly lighter in color than the remaining part of the last whorl. A moderately deep, subsutural, broadly arcuate anal sinus extends across the subsutural ramp and is confluent with the large forward extension of the outer lip.

The radula bears duplex marginal teeth measuring approximately 240 µm in length, corresponding to 3.0% of the aperture length excluding the canal. The major limb is lanceolate in dorsal view, weakly curved, and bears sharp cutting edges at its tip. The accessory limb accounts for about half of the tooth width, measures about 0.75 of the total tooth length, and is inserted into a very shallow socket on the dorsal side of the major limb.

== Distribution ==
This marine species occurs off Northwestern Madagascar at depths between 650 m and 943 m.
