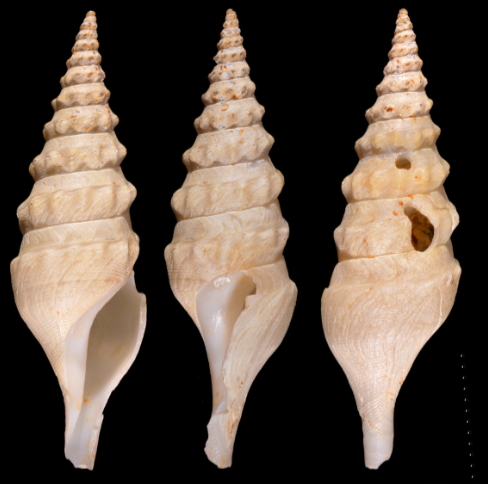
- Shell of Leucosyrinx ringevali (holotype)

Scientific classification
- Kingdom: Animalia
- Phylum: Mollusca
- Class: Gastropoda
- Subclass: Caenogastropoda
- Order: Neogastropoda
- Superfamily: Conoidea
- Family: Pseudomelatomidae
- Genus: Leucosyrinx
- Species: L. ringevali

Binomial name
- Leucosyrinx ringevali Kantor, Fedosov & Puillandre, 2025

= Leucosyrinx ringevali =

Species of gastropod

Leucosyrinx ringevali is a species of sea snail, a marine gastropod mollusk in the family Pseudomelatomidae, the turrids and allies.

== Description ==
The length of the shell of the holotype attains 34.2 mm, its diameter 10.2 mm.

(Original description) The shell (holotype) is medium-sized, narrowly fusiform, and characterized by a high spire and a uniform light tan coloration. It comprises slightly more than ten teleoconch whorls. The protoconch is paucispiral, consisting of about two rounded whorls, although it is partially broken. The transition between the protoconch and the teleoconch is marked by the appearance of axial folds.

The teleoconch whorls are strongly angled at the shoulder and exhibit a distinctly concave subsutural ramp. The suture is distinct, shallow, impressed, and slightly undulating. The body whorl bears 14 strong, oblique, broad, and rounded axial folds, while the penultimate whorl bears 13 such folds. These folds fade on the sharply delimited subsutural ramp, become slightly weaker toward the lower suture, and disappear at the periphery of the whorl. On the last half of the body whorl, the folds progressively weaken and are no longer discernible near the aperture. The interspaces between the folds are slightly broader than the folds themselves.

The spiral sculpture is moderately to well developed and consists of rounded, narrow, and evenly developed cords distributed over the entire shell surface, being visible both on the axial folds and in the interspaces between them. There are 8–9 such cords on the subsutural ramp of both the last and the penultimate whorls. Numerous thin growth lines are present and are particularly prominent on the subsutural ramp. The shell base is slightly convex and weakly curved, passing smoothly into a long and straight siphonal canal.

The aperture is narrow and elongate-oval and is poorly differentiated from the canal. The inner lip is nearly straight. The columellar and parietal areas bear a narrow but distinct callus. A moderately deep, subsutural, broadly arcuate anal sinus extends across the subsutural ramp and is confluent with the pronounced forward extension of the outer lip.

== Distribution ==
This marine species occurs off Madagascar at depths between 780 m and 943 m.
