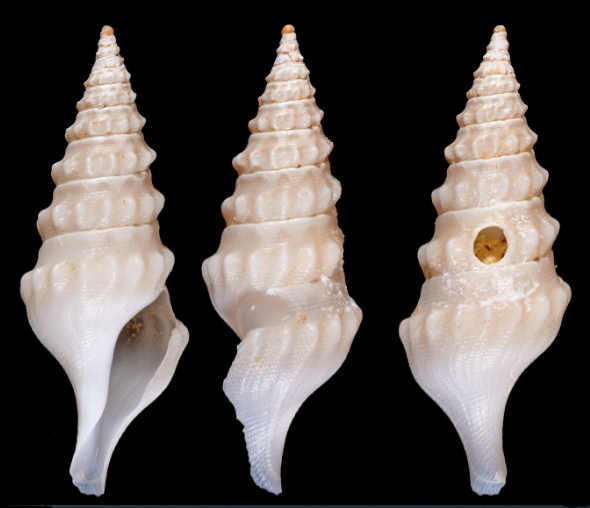
- Shell of Leucosyrinx maestratii (holotype)

Scientific classification
- Kingdom: Animalia
- Phylum: Mollusca
- Class: Gastropoda
- Subclass: Caenogastropoda
- Order: Neogastropoda
- Superfamily: Conoidea
- Family: Pseudomelatomidae
- Genus: Leucosyrinx
- Species: L. maestratii

Binomial name
- Leucosyrinx maestratii Kantor, Fedosov & Puillandre, 2025

= Leucosyrinx maestratii =

Species of gastropod

Leucosyrinx maestratii is a species of sea snail, a marine gastropod mollusk in the family Pseudomelatomidae, the turrids and allies.

== Description ==
The length of the shell attains 22.8 mm, its diameter 8.1 mm.

(Original description) The thin and fragile shell is small. It is biconical in shape, with a high spire and a very light yellowish coloration that is nearly white. The protoconch is paucispiral, light orange, small, and bulbous, micro-shagreened and strongly eroded; the transition from protoconch to teleoconch is not discernible because of this erosion. The teleoconch comprises about 8.5 whorls that are strongly and roundly angled at the shoulder and bear a strongly concave subsutural ramp on all whorls. The suture is distinct and impressed.

The last and penultimate whorls carry 15–16 strong, oblique axial folds. These folds fade on the subsutural ramp, reach the lower suture, and extend down to the shell base. On the last and penultimate whorls, the interspaces between the folds are equal to or narrower than the folds themselves.

The spiral sculpture is very distinct and consists of low, slightly wavy cords of similar width that cover the entire shell, are particularly evident on the shoulder, and also cross the axial folds. The interspaces between the cords are narrower than the cords in most areas, and only between a few cords do the interspaces equal the cord width. On the subsutural ramp, the cords are distinct and show slight variation in width; there are eight cords on the subsutural ramp of both the last and the penultimate whorls. Numerous thin but indistinct growth lines are present.

The shell base is rounded and moderately convex, quickly constricting and passing into a medium-long, slightly sinuous siphonal canal. The aperture is narrow and elongate-oval and is poorly differentiated from the siphonal canal; the inner lip is weakly convex and nearly straight. The columellar and parietal areas bear a narrow, distinct white callus. A deep, subsutural, broadly arcuate anal sinus extends across the subsutural ramp and is confluent with the large forward extension of the outer lip.

== Distribution ==
This marine species occurs off the Solomon Islands, at depths between 970 m to 1045 m.
