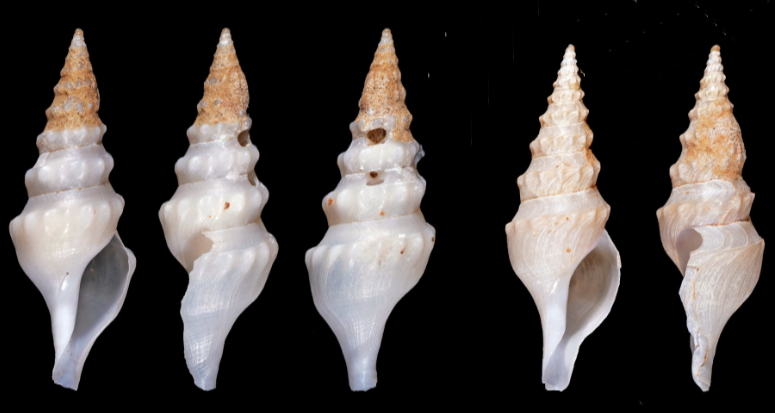
- Shell of Leucosyrinx vanweddingenae (holotype)

Scientific classification
- Kingdom: Animalia
- Phylum: Mollusca
- Class: Gastropoda
- Subclass: Caenogastropoda
- Order: Neogastropoda
- Superfamily: Conoidea
- Family: Pseudomelatomidae
- Genus: Leucosyrinx
- Species: L. vanweddingenae

Binomial name
- Leucosyrinx vanweddingenae Kantor, Fedosov & Puillandre, 2025

= Leucosyrinx vanweddingenae =

Species of gastropod

Leucosyrinx vanweddingenae is a species of sea snail, a marine gastropod mollusk in the family Pseudomelatomidae, the turrids and allies.

== Description ==
The length of the shell of the holotype attains 27.1 mm, its diameter 9.3 mm: aperture length (including siphonal canal) 12.5 mm; aperture length (excluding canal) 8.5 mm.

(Original description) The shell is small, narrow-fusiform, rather solid, and uniformly off-white, with a high spire. It comprises 8.5 teleoconch whorls. The protoconch is paucispiral, bulbous, light tan in colour, and consists of approximately 1.75 rounded whorls. The transition from the protoconch to the teleoconch is indistinct and is marked by the appearance of a shoulder keel. The teleoconch whorls are distinctly angulate at the shoulder and possess a markedly concave subsutural ramp. The suture is distinct, shallow, and impressed.

The body whorl bears 15 strong, broad, rounded, weakly oblique axial folds, while the penultimate whorl has 14 such folds. The interspaces are slightly broader than the folds. The folds fade on the sharply delimited subsutural ramp, become slightly weaker towards the lower suture, and disappear at the periphery of the body whorl.

The spiral sculpture is very weak and consists of rounded, narrow, evenly developed spiral cords on the periphery of the body whorl, the shell base, and the siphonal canal, but is absent from the subsutural ramp. Approximately 20 spiral cords are present on the periphery, shell base, and canal. The interspaces are uneven, ranging from one to three times the width of the cords. Numerous weak, fine growth lines are present.

The shell base is slightly convex and gently curved, passing smoothly into a moderately long, straight siphonal canal. The aperture is narrow, elongate-oval, and only weakly differentiated from the siphonal canal. The inner lip is nearly straight. The columellar and parietal regions bear a narrow but distinct callus. The anal sinus is moderately deep, subsutural, and broadly arcuate, extending across the subsutural ramp and confluent with the prominent forward projection of the outer lip.

== Distribution ==
This marine species occurs off South Madagascar at depths between 650 m and 729 m.
