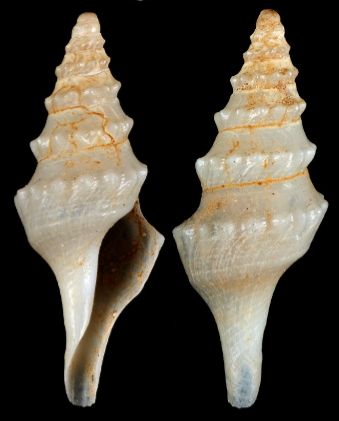
- Shell of Leucosyrinx julia (holotype)

Scientific classification
- Kingdom: Animalia
- Phylum: Mollusca
- Class: Gastropoda
- Subclass: Caenogastropoda
- Order: Neogastropoda
- Superfamily: Conoidea
- Family: Pseudomelatomidae
- Genus: Leucosyrinx
- Species: L. julia

Binomial name
- Leucosyrinx julia Thiele, 1925

= Leucosyrinx julia =

Species of gastropod

Leucosyrinx julia is a species of sea snail, a marine gastropod mollusk in the family Pseudomelatomidae, the turrids.

== Description ==
The largest type specimen has a shell length of 10.6 mm; it appears to be adult, and was illustrated by Thiele (1925). Conchologically, it exhibits all diagnostic features of Leucosyrinx. The original illustration depicts a strongly angular shell base, although in the actual specimen this appears somewhat more obtuse. In overall outline and size, the shell resembles Leucosyrinx lozoueti, which, however, differs in having a distinct spiral sculpture composed of much finer and more uniformly spaced cords. A.W.B. Powell (1969) referred several specimens from the John Murray expedition in the Gulf of Aden, at a depth of 1040 m and with shell lengths of up to 53 mm, to this species.

== Distribution ==
This marine species occurs off East Africa to the Gulf of Aden at depths between 693 m and 1040 m.
