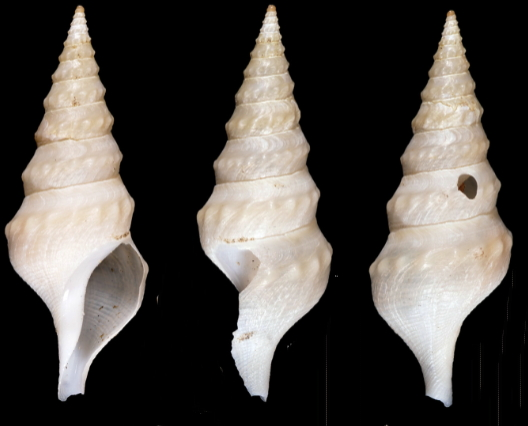
- Shell of Leucosyrinx bourgeoisae (holotype)

Scientific classification
- Kingdom: Animalia
- Phylum: Mollusca
- Class: Gastropoda
- Subclass: Caenogastropoda
- Order: Neogastropoda
- Superfamily: Conoidea
- Family: Pseudomelatomidae
- Genus: Leucosyrinx
- Species: L. bourgeoisae

Binomial name
- Leucosyrinx bourgeoisae Kantor, Fedosov & Puillandre, 2025

= Leucosyrinx bourgeoisae =

Species of gastropod

Leucosyrinx bourgeoisae is a species of sea snail, a marine gastropod mollusk in the family Pseudomelatomidae, the turrids and allies.

== Description ==
The length of the shell attains 32.1 mm, its diameter 11.3 mm.

(Original description) The thin and fragile shell (holotype) is medium-sized. It is broadly fusiform in shape, with a medium-high spire and a very light yellowish coloration that is nearly white. The protoconch is paucispiral, small, and bulbous, consisting of about 1.75 rounded, light brown, micro-shagreened whorls. The transition from protoconch to teleoconch is marked by a distinct growth line and by the appearance of a shoulder keel. The shell bears 9.75 teleoconch whorls that are distinctly and roundly angled at the shoulder, with a weakly concave subsutural ramp that becomes nearly flat on the last and penultimate whorls. The suture is distinct, shallow, and impressed.

The shoulder of the body whorl carries 15 moderately strong, oblique, short axial folds that form rounded, closely spaced knobs, and the penultimate whorl carries 16 such folds. These folds fade on the subsutural ramp and reach the lower suture on the upper four to five whorls; on the body whorl they disappear shortly below the shoulder. On the last and penultimate whorls, the interspaces between the folds slightly exceed the width of the folds. Below the shoulder, the spiral sculpture is distinct and consists of slightly variable, low, slightly wavy cords that extend over the entire shell, including the siphonal canal; the intervals between the cords are one to two times the cord width. On the subsutural ramp, the sculpture is indistinct and reduced to very weak spiral striation. Numerous thin but distinct growth lines are present.

The shell base is rounded and strongly convex, then rapidly constricts and passes into a long, rather narrow, and straight siphonal canal. The aperture is moderately broad, elongate-oval, and poorly differentiated from the siphonal canal; the inner lip is weakly convex. The columellar and parietal areas bear a narrow, distinct, white callus. A deep, subsutural, broadly arcuate anal sinus extends across the subsutural ramp and is confluent with the large forward extension of the outer lip, as inferred from the course of the growth lines, since the outer lip is partially broken.

The radula is of medium length and comprises about 35 rows of teeth, of which 11–12 are nascent. The marginal teeth are duplex and measure approximately 350 µm in length, corresponding to 3.5% of the aperture length excluding the canal. The major limb is narrowly lanceolate in dorsal view and curved. The accessory limb accounts for about half of the tooth width, measures about 0.75 of the total tooth length, and is inserted into a distinct socket on the dorsal side of the major limb.

== Distribution ==
This marine species occurs in the Bismarck Sea and from New Caledonia to Papua New Guinea at depths between 775 m and 805 m.
