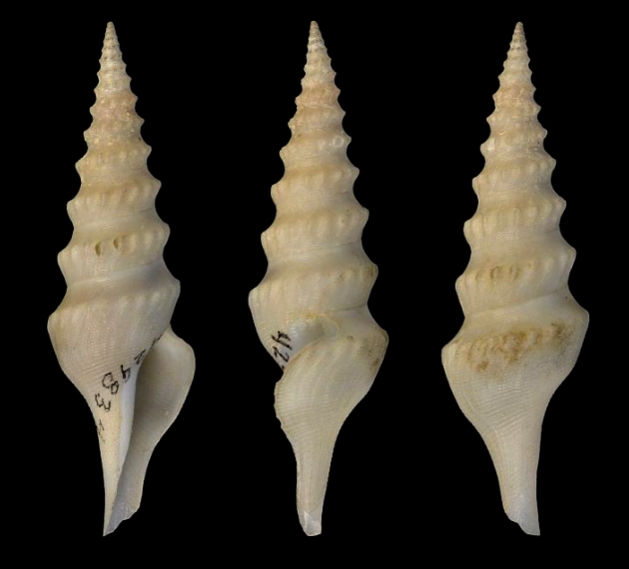
- Shell of Leucosyrinx verrillii (holotype of the synonym Leucosyrinx janetae at the Smithsonian Institution))

Scientific classification
- Kingdom: Animalia
- Phylum: Mollusca
- Class: Gastropoda
- Subclass: Caenogastropoda
- Order: Neogastropoda
- Superfamily: Conoidea
- Family: Pseudomelatomidae
- Genus: Leucosyrinx
- Species: L. verrillii

Binomial name
- Leucosyrinx verrillii (Dall, 1881)

Synonyms
- Leucosyrinx janetae Bartsch, 1934; Leucosyrinx sigsbeei (Dall, 1881); Leucosyrinx tenoceras (Dall, 1889); Pleurotoma (Leucosyrinx) tenoceras Dall, 1889; Pleurotoma devestitum Locard, 1897; Pleurotoma sigsbeei Dall, 1881; Pleurotoma sigsbeei (Dall, 1881); Pleurotoma talismani Locard, 1897; Pleurotoma talismani var. attenuata Locard, 1897; Pleurotoma talismani var. curta Locard, 1897; Pleurotoma talismani var. elongata Locard, 1897; Pleurotoma tenoceras Dall, 1889; Pleurotoma verrillii Dall, 1881 (original description); Surcula gradata Thiele, 1925

= Leucosyrinx verrillii =

Species of gastropod

Leucosyrinx verrillii is a species of sea snail, a marine gastropod mollusk in the family Pseudomelatomidae, the turrids and allies.

== Description ==
The shell size varies between 23 mm and 38 mm.

It is distinguished among several allied forms by the distinct fine even threads on the fasciole, the form and number of its riblets, and the absence of any presutural wrinkles or coronating band.

The long shell is very slender. The aperture is longer than the spire behind it. The color of the shell is white or ashy. The protoconch is yellowish, subglobular, glassy, smooth. The shell contains ten whorls, beside the protoconch. The suture is appressed, a coronet of short, elevated, backward pointing wrinkles marginating the whorl in front of it. The fasciole is wide, with obsolete sculpture or is smooth, polished, very sloping, subconcave. The shoulder of the whorl is angulated, ornamented (on the whorl before the last) with about four- teen nodular riblets. These riblets on the early whorls are short, stout, and very prominent. Later they become more slender and oblique, and on the body whorl tend to become obsolete entirely. The whole shell, except the fasciole, is covered with fine flattened threads, not prominent, and often wavy or obliquely directed from irregularities of growth. The aperture is long and rather narrow. The siphonal canal is narrow, long and flaring a little at the end. The outer lip is thin, simple, broadly arched forward, with no internal lira. The notch is deep, very wide, extending from the suture to the shoulder. The columellar lip slightly excavated, white and smooth. The columella is straight and attenuated in front. The whorls are moderately full, having a drawn-out appearance. The operculum is thin, pear-shaped, acutely pointed, with a thin marginal rib; pale horn-color. (described as Leucosyrinx tenoceras)

== Distribution ==
This species is found in European waters along the British Isles and the Bay of Biscay, in the Atlantic Ocean along the Azores, Cape Verde, Morocco; from North Carolina to Brazil, in the Gulf of Mexico, the Caribbean Sea and the Lesser Antilles.
