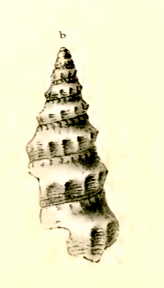
- Original image of a shell of Leucosyrinx hemimeres

Scientific classification
- Kingdom: Animalia
- Phylum: Mollusca
- Class: Gastropoda
- Subclass: Caenogastropoda
- Order: Neogastropoda
- Superfamily: Conoidea
- Family: Pseudomelatomidae
- Genus: Leucosyrinx
- Species: L. hemimeres

Binomial name
- Leucosyrinx hemimeres (Watson, 1881)

Synonyms
- Pleurotoma (Surcula) hemimeres Watson, 1881

= Leucosyrinx hemimeres =

Species of gastropod

Leucosyrinx hemimeres is a species of sea snail, a marine gastropod mollusk in the family Pseudomelatomidae, the turrids and allies.

== Description ==
The length of the shell varies between 15 mm and 35 mm.

(Original description) The high shell is conical, with a small, round-tipped conical apex. It is ribless, but with a keel beset with longish narrow tubercles.

Sculpture: Longitudinals—there are only fine hair-like lines of growth. Spirals—about two-thirds down each whorl is a very sharp and prominent angulation. The keel thus formed is beset by numerous small, sharpish, narrow and elongated tubercles, which fail to become ribs. Of these tubercles there are about 12 on the earlier whorls, and they become more numerous on the succeeding whorls. Below this keel there is a straight-lined contraction. Above it there is a long, slightly concave shoulder, with a delicate row of small tubercles at the top close to the suture. Both rows of tubercles, but especially the upper, are very sharp and distinct on the earlier whorls, but lose individuality further down the spire. From the keel downwards the whorls are scored with flat rounded threads.

The colour of the shell is pale buff, deepening somewhat up the spire, glossy. The spire is high, conical, the profile lines only slightly interrupted by the prominence of the tubercled keel. Apex : the two embryonic whorls are smooth, small, conical, with a small rounded tip slightly flattened down on one side. The contains 9 (remaining) whorls, short, of very regular increase, slightly concave in the shoulder, sharply angulated at the keel, and contracted into the suture below. The whole base and the columella have been broken away. The suture is rather oblique, defined by the slight contraction of the superior and inferior whorls. The aperture is broken, but the sinus is broad, rounded, and deep, in consequence of the long forward sweep of the pinion-like edge of the outer lip.

== Distribution ==
This species occurs in the Atlantic Ocean off Brazil.
