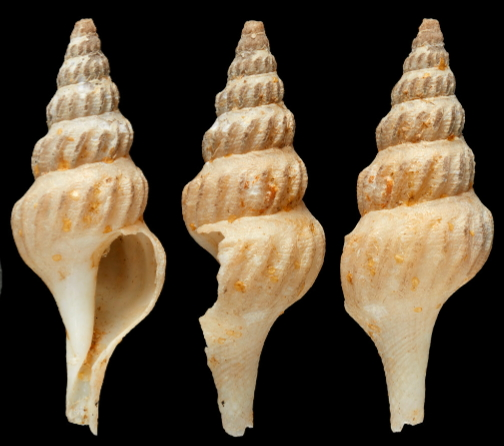
- Shell of Leucosyrinx anteridion (holotype)

Scientific classification
- Kingdom: Animalia
- Phylum: Mollusca
- Class: Gastropoda
- Subclass: Caenogastropoda
- Order: Neogastropoda
- Superfamily: Conoidea
- Family: Pseudomelatomidae
- Genus: Leucosyrinx
- Species: L. anteridion

Binomial name
- Leucosyrinx anteridion (R. B. Watson, 1881)

Synonyms
- Clavatula (Surcula) anteridion (R. B. Watson, 1881) superseded combination; Comitas anteridion (R. B. Watson, 1881); Pleurotoma (Surcula) anteridion R. B. Watson, 1881 superseded combination; Pleurotoma anteridion R. B. Watson, 1881 superseded combination

= Leucosyrinx anteridion =

Species of gastropod

Leucosyrinx anteridion is a species of sea snail, a marine gastropod mollusc in the family Pseudomelatomidae, the turrids and allies.

== Description ==
(Original description) The shell is high, narrow, biconically fusiform, and slightly subscalar, with angularly convex whorls ornamented by longitudinal ribs. It is thin and light tawny in colour.

The longitudinal sculpture consists of narrow, raised, oblique ribs that originate at a distinct angulation just below the suture. The ribs slope from left to right, extending upward to the suture but fading gradually before reaching the base. They are separated by broad, rounded interspaces that are wider than the ribs themselves. Approximately 19 ribs are present on the body whorl, with progressively fewer on the preceding whorls. Fine, hair-like, flexuous growth lines cover the entire shell.

The spiral sculpture is weak on the subsutural shoulder (sinus area), where it appears as a few faint, regular, scratch-like lines. These spiral threads become more pronounced over the ribbed portion of the whorl. On the base, the interspaces become narrower and more convex, while the spiral threads gradually strengthen toward the siphonal canal, where they form distinct threads before weakening again near the tip.

The shell is uniformly light tawny, becoming paler on the siphonal canal, while the columella is white.

The spire is high, conical, and slightly subscalar, although the apex is broken. It probably consists of about ten whorls. The whorls are relatively short, each with a straight, slightly sloping shoulder, a convex profile, and an apparent contraction below the shoulder caused by the gradual disappearance of the longitudinal ribs as they approach the suture.

The base is conical and contracts rather rapidly into a straight, narrow, cylindrical siphonal canal, which is only slightly recurved.

The suture is fine, regularly impressed, and distinctly linear, following a course that diverges noticeably from that of the spiral sculpture.

The aperture is club-shaped, being broadly oval without an angulation at its upper part, and continues below into a long, narrow, slightly twisted siphonal canal. The outer lip is thin and sharp, following a smooth, regular curve from the suture to the base of the canal. Upon separating from the body whorl, it immediately curves backward to form a deep, rounded, and open anal sinus. From the sinus, the lip expands in a broad convex curve, retreats slightly near the base of the siphonal canal, and then extends straight to the rounded anterior tip.

The inner lip is thin, porcelaneous, and narrowly developed. It bears fine longitudinal markings and extends obliquely to a long, pointed termination on the columella before continuing along the siphonal canal as a thin, sharp edge that is slightly truncated posteriorly near its distal end.

== Distribution ==
This marine species occurs off South Africa at depths between 270 m and 420 m.
