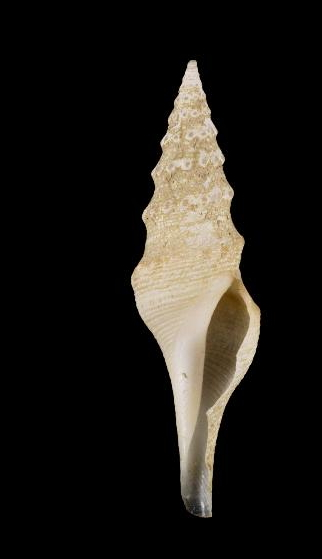
- Shell of Leucosyrinx verrillii

Scientific classification
- Kingdom: Animalia
- Phylum: Mollusca
- Class: Gastropoda
- Subclass: Caenogastropoda
- Order: Neogastropoda
- Superfamily: Conoidea
- Family: Pseudomelatomidae
- Genus: Leucosyrinx; Dall, 1889

Type species
- Pleurotoma verrillii Dall 1881

Species
- See text

Synonyms
- Pleurotoma (Leucosyrinx) Dall, 1889

= Leucosyrinx =

Genus of gastropods

Leucosyrinx is a genus of sea snails, marine gastropod mollusks in the family Pseudomelatomidae.

== Description ==
(Original description) The thin shell is white or pale without color pattern. The anal notch lies behind the periphery or at the suture. The sculpture is delicate and consists of spiral keels or threads and often oblique riblets on the shoulder of the whorls. The peripheral keel, if present, is not recurved. The operculum is thin, nucleus apical, scar of attachment small. The larval shell is glassy, rounded or keeled. The other shell characters are as in Pleurotoma. The species type is Pleurotoma verrillii Dall.

This group is intended to contain the operculated species of Pleurotomida which are so characteristic of the archibenthal region. They are distinctly contrasted with the coarse, spotted or maculated shallow-water species of Pleuroma proper, by their thin, white, delicately sculptured shells. They are apart from Drillia by having no subtubular projection of the anal notch when adult and no thick varix to mark their maturity. They are separable from the archibenthal Drillias also by their larger shells, longer siphonal canal, and more inflated habit. The anal notch is generally wider, more rounded and nearer the suture than in the typical Pleurotoma, and the operculum proportionally wider and more delicate.

(More recent description by Kantor et al.) The shell of Leucosyrinx is relatively poor in diagnostic features. The intraspecific variability within molecularly defined species can be high. The shell is small to large, reaching up to about 90 mm in length in Leucosyrinx bolognai. It is narrow fusiform to broadly oval, with a high spire and a distinct siphonal canal that is medium‑long to long. The shell is uniformly coloured, ranging from off‑white through beige to light brown. The protoconch is paucispiral and small, about 1 mm in diameter, and consists of 1.5–1.75 rounded whorls. The teleoconch whorls are roundly angled at the shoulder, at least on the upper whorls, and bear a well‑defined, concave subsutural ramp.

The axial sculpture consists of usually strong, oblique axial ribs that occupy the shoulder and the area below it, but do not extend onto the subsutural ramp. These ribs may be reduced to mere knobs on the shoulder, or they may reach the periphery and even the shell base. The spiral sculpture is very similar among species and ranges from weak to rather strong and is formed by uniform spiral cords, which may be present or absent on the subsutural ramp.

The anal sinus is moderately deep, subsutural, and broadly arcuate. It spans the entire subsutural ramp and merges with a large forward extension of the outer lip. The shape and position of the anal sinus, which spans across the entire subsutural ramp but does not extend below the shoulder, distinguishes Leucosyrinx from Comitas. The operculum is narrow to moderately broad and leaf‑shaped, with a terminal nucleus.

The radular morphology is fairly uniform within the genus. The radular marginal teeth are duplex, narrow to broadly lanceolate, and appear rather flat in dorsal view, particularly in the anterior portion or tooth tip. The major limb is pointed, with sharp cutting edges; it is broadest at mid‑length and narrows toward both ends, and it shows a distinct socket on the dorsal surface where the accessory limb embeds. The central formation is very weak to completely absent, represented only by indistinct symmetrical folds of the membrane and, more rarely, by a very weak central cusp.

== Distribution ==
Leucosyrinx is a broadly distributed genus found in both the Indo-Pacific and Atlantic Oceans (from North Carolina to Argentina); also off Japan and Australia

== Species ==
Species within the genus Leucosyrinx include:

- Leucosyrinx aequatorialis Thiele, 1925 (not Leucosyrinx equatorialis (Dall, 1919) (taxon inquirendum) )
- Leucosyrinx allisoni (Rehder & Ladd, 1973)
- Leucosyrinx anteridion (R. B. Watson, 1881)
- Leucosyrinx arcana (E. A. Smith, 1899)
- Leucosyrinx archibenthalis Powell, 1969
- Leucosyrinx argentina N. Sánchez & Pastorino, 2024
- Leucosyrinx barashi Nordsieck, 1982 (taxon inquirendum)
- Leucosyrinx bernardeti Kantor, Fedosov & Puillandre, 2025
- Leucosyrinx boiteuxi Kantor, Fedosov & Puillandre, 2025
- Leucosyrinx bolbodes (Watson, 1881)
- Leucosyrinx bolognai (Bozzetti, 2001)
- Leucosyrinx bourgeoisae Kantor, Fedosov & Puillandre, 2025
- Leucosyrinx breviplicata (E. A. Smith, 1899)
- † Leucosyrinx buricana Olsson, 1942
- Leucosyrinx caecilia Thiele, 1925
- Leucosyrinx canyonensis (Dell, 1956)
- † Leucosyrinx chloris Olsson, 1922
- Leucosyrinx claviforma (Kosuge, 1992)
- † Leucosyrinx climoi Maxwell, 1988
- Leucosyrinx curviplicata (Sysoev, 1996)
- Leucosyrinx derzellei Kantor, Fedosov & Puillandre, 2025
- Leucosyrinx diomedea (A. W. B. Powell, 1969)
- Leucosyrinx elsa Thiele, 1925(taxon inquirendum)
- Leucosyrinx equatorialis (Dall, 1919) (taxon inquirendum) (not Leucosyrinx aequatorialis Thiele, 1925
- Leucosyrinx erna Thiele, 1925
- Leucosyrinx esilda (Dall, 1908) (taxon inquirendum)
- Leucosyrinx eurina (E. A. Smith, 1899)
- Leucosyrinx exulans (Dall, 1890)
- Leucosyrinx farhatorum Kantor, Fedosov & Puillandre, 2025
- † Leucosyrinx fijiensis Ladd, 1982
- Leucosyrinx floraecharlottae Kantor, Fedosov & Puillandre, 2025
- Leucosyrinx gaelae Kantor, Fedosov & Puillandre, 2025
- Leucosyrinx granuloplicata (Kosuge, 1992)
- Leucosyrinx gypsina (Dall, 1895)
- Leucosyrinx halicyria (Melvill, 1904)
- Leucosyrinx hemimeres (Watson, 1881)
- Leucosyrinx herilda (Dall, 1908)
- Leucosyrinx herosae Kantor, Fedosov & Puillandre, 2025
- † Leucosyrinx iwaensis MacNeil, 1960
- Leucosyrinx jeedara Kantor, Hallan & Criscione, 2022
- Leucosyrinx julia Thiele, 1925
- Leucosyrinx kirai (A. W. B. Powell, 1969)
- Leucosyrinx legalli Kantor, Fedosov & Puillandre, 2025
- Leucosyrinx lemarcisi Kantor, Fedosov & Puillandre, 2025
- Leucosyrinx lozoueti Kantor, Fedosov & Puillandre, 2025
- Leucosyrinx luzonica (Powell, 1969)
- Leucosyrinx macrobertsoni Powell, 1958
- Leucosyrinx madagascariensis Ardovini, 2022
- Leucosyrinx maestratii Kantor, Fedosov & Puillandre, 2025
- Leucosyrinx margaritae (E. A. Smith, 1904)
- Leucosyrinx melvilli (Schepman, 1913)
- Leucosyrinx modicae Kantor, Fedosov & Puillandre, 2025
- † Leucosyrinx nicoya Olsson, 1942
- Leucosyrinx nodulocordata Kantor, Fedosov & Puillandre, 2025
- Leucosyrinx oliverioi Kantor, Fedosov & Puillandre, 2025
- Leucosyrinx pagodaeformis (Schepman, 1913)
- Leucosyrinx palawanica (A. W. B. Powell, 1969)
- Leucosyrinx paupera (R. B. Watson, 1881)
- Leucosyrinx pelagia (Dall, 1881)
- Leucosyrinx placaisae Kantor, Fedosov & Puillandre, 2025
- Leucosyrinx plebeia (Watson, 1881)
- Leucosyrinx powelli (Rehder & Ladd, 1973)
- Leucosyrinx quinetae Kantor, Fedosov & Puillandre, 2025
- † Leucosyrinx rabbidgei Ladd, 1982
- Leucosyrinx rattiae Kantor, Fedosov & Puillandre, 2025
- Leucosyrinx ringevali Kantor, Fedosov & Puillandre, 2025
- Leucosyrinx sansibarica Thiele, 1925
- Leucosyrinx schepmani Kantor, Fedosov & Puillandre, 2025
- Leucosyrinx subgrundifera (Dall, 1888)
- Leucosyrinx suratensis (Thiele, 1925)
- Leucosyrinx taludana Castellanos & Landoni, 1993(nomen dubium)
- Leucosyrinx thisbe (E. A. Smith, 1906)
- Leucosyrinx truwalamuka Kantor, Hallan & Criscione, 2022
- Leucosyrinx turrita Sysoev, 1990
- Leucosyrinx undosa (Schepman, 1913)
- Leucosyrinx urbanae Kantor, Fedosov & Puillandre, 2025
- Leucosyrinx vanweddingenae Kantor, Fedosov & Puillandre, 2025
- Leucosyrinx verrillii (Dall, 1881)
- † Leucosyrinx xenica Woodring, 1970
- † Leucosyrinx yonegafukuroensis Iwai, 1959
- Leucosyrinx zahariasi Kantor, Fedosov & Puillandre, 2025
- Leucosyrinx zucconi Kantor, Fedosov & Puillandre, 2025

== Synonyms ==
- Leucosyrinx amycus W.H. Dall, 1919: synonym of Aforia goodei (Dall, 1890)
- Leucosyrinx angusteplicata (Strebel, 1905): synonym of Antarctospira angusteplicata (Strebel, 1905)
- Leucosyrinx (Sibogasyrinx) archibenthalis Powell, 1969 : synonym of Sibogasyrinx archibenthalis (Powell, 1969) (basionym)
- Leucosyrinx aequatorialis Thiele, 1925: synonym of Comitas aequatorialis (Thiele, 1925)
- † Leucosyrinx alta (Harris, 1897): synonym of † Parasyrinx alta (Harris, 1897)
- Leucosyrinx angustiplicata (Strebel, 1905): synonym of Leucosyrinx angusteplicata (Strebel, 1905)
- Leucosyrinx badenpowelli Dell, 1990: synonym of Antarctospira badenpowelli (Dell, 1990)
- Leucosyrinx circinata Dall, 1873: synonym of Aforia circinata (Dall, 1873)
- Leucosyrinx circumcinctum Locard, 1897: synonym of Borsonia hirondelleae (Dautzenberg, 1891)
- Leucosyrinx clionella Dall, 1908: synonym of Burchia clionella (Dall, 1908)
- Leucosyrinx cuvierensis Mestayer, 1919: synonym of Terefundus cuvierensis (Mestayer, 1919)
- Leucosyrinx dalli (Bush, 1893): synonym of Corinnaeturris leucomata (Dall, 1881)
- Leucosyrinx eremita (Murdoch & Suter, 1906): synonym of Antimelatoma eremita (Murdoch & Suter, 1906)
- Leucosyrinx erica Thiele, 1925: synonym of Comispira erica (Thiele, 1925)
- Leucosyrinx erosina Dall, 1908: synonym of Borsonella erosina (Dall, 1908)
- Leucosyrinx erranea (Locard, 1897): synonym of Borsonia hirondelleae (Dautzenberg, 1891)
- Leucosyrinx falklandica Powell, 1951: synonym of Antarctospira falklandica (Powell, 1951) (original combination)
- Leucosyrinx galapagana Dall, 1919: synonym of Exilia cortezi (Dall, 1908)
- Leucosyrinx goodei Dall, 1890: synonym of Aforia goodei (Dall, 1890)
- Leucosyrinx gradata Thiele, 1925: synonym of Leucosyrinx verrillii (Dall, 1881)
- Leucosyrinx janetae Bartsch, 1934: synonym of Leucosyrinx verrillii (Dall, 1881)
- Leucosyrinx kantori McLean, 1995: synonym of Rhodopetoma amycus (Dall, 1919) (unnecessary replacement name for Antiplanes amycus, by McLean treated as a secondary homonym of Leucosyrinx amycus)
- Leucosyrinx kincaidi Dall, 1919: synonym of Aforia kincaidi (Dall, 1919)
- Leucosyrinx lancea Lee, 2001: synonym of Sibogasyrinx lancea (Y.-C. Lee, 2001) (superseded combination)
- Leucosyrinx macroberstoni Powell, 1958: synonym of Leucosyrinx macrobertsoni Powell, 1958 (misspelling)
- Leucosyrinx mai Li & Li, 2008: synonym of Comispira mai (B.-Q. Li & X.-Z. Li, 2008) (original combination)
- Leucosyrinx mawsoni Powell, 1958: synonym of Antarctospira mawsoni (Powell, 1958) (original combination)
- Leucosyrinx minatoensis Otuka, 1959: synonym of Aforia circinata (Dall, 1873)
- Leucosyrinx otohimei Ozaki, 1958: synonym of Aforia circinata (Dall, 1873)
- Leucosyrinx pacifica Dall, 1908: synonym of Belomitra pacifica (Dall, 1908)
- Leucosyrinx paragenota Powell, 1951: synonym of Antarctospira paragenota (Powell, 1951)
- Leucosyrinx paratenoceras Powell, 1951: synonym of Typhlodaphne paratenoceras (Powell, 1951) (original combination)
- Leucosyrinx persimilis (Dall, 1890): synonym of Aforia persimilis (Dall, 1890)
- Leucosyrinx pikei (Dell, 1963): synonym of Sibogasyrinx pikei (Dell, 1963) (unaccepted > superseded combination)
- Leucosyrinx pyramidalis (Schepman, 1913): synonym of Sibogasyrinx pyramidalis (Schepman, 1913)
- Leucosyrinx queenslandica Powell, 1969: synonym of Zemacies queenslandica (Powell, 1969)
- Leucosyrinx recta Hedley, 1903: synonym of Austrocarina recta (Hedley, 1903)
- † Leucosyrinx rugata (Conrad, 1862): synonym of † Nodisurculina rugata (Conrad, 1862)
- Leucosyrinx sigsbeei (Dall, 1881): synonym of Leucosyrinx verrillii (Dall, 1881)
- † Leucosyrinx subaltus P. Marshall & Murdoch, 1919: synonym of † Parasyrinx subalta (P. Marshall & R. Murdoch, 1919)
- Leucosyrinx tenoceras (Dall, 1889): synonym of Leucosyrinx verrillii (Dall, 1881)
- Leucosyrinx thomsoni Mestayer, 1919: synonym of Taranis nexilis bicarinata (Suter, 1915)
