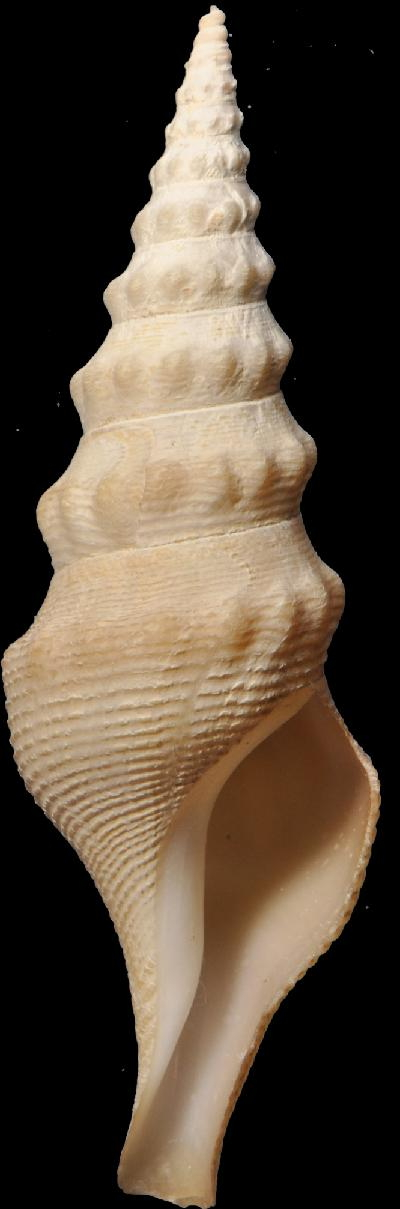
- Shell of Leucosyrinx plebeia (specimen at MNHN, Paris)

Scientific classification
- Kingdom: Animalia
- Phylum: Mollusca
- Class: Gastropoda
- Subclass: Caenogastropoda
- Order: Neogastropoda
- Superfamily: Conoidea
- Family: Pseudomelatomidae
- Genus: Leucosyrinx
- Species: L. plebeia

Binomial name
- Leucosyrinx plebeia (Watson, 1881)

Synonyms
- Pleurotoma (Surcula) plebeia Watson, 1881

= Leucosyrinx plebeia =

Species of gastropod

Leucosyrinx plebeia is a species of sea snail in the family Pseudomelatomidae.

== Description ==
The length of the shell varies between 16 mm and 38 mm.

(Original description) The shell is high, narrow, fusiform, subscalar, angulated and tubercled on the angle, strong, rough, yellowish white.

Sculpture : Longitudinals—the upper whorls are nearly bisected by a bluntisb angulation, which is made more marked by about 20 small, oblique, longitudinally elongated knobs, of which scarcely a trace appears below or above the keel. They become fewer up the spire and die out on the body whorl. There are very many, rough, very unequal, curved lines of growth. The whole surface is covered by coarse, unequal, and very irregular threads, varying in their direction, and interrupted by the longitudinal lines of growth. These are most equal in the infra-sutural tract, where the line of the old sinus-markings lie. Below the keel they occur alternatingly as stronger and finer. On the base and aperture they are coarse, but almost disappear on the point. They and the suture are exceptionally independent of one another.

The colour of the shell is yellowish porcellanous white. The spire is high, narrow, conical, and slopingly subscalar. The apex is broken. The shell contains probably 9-10 whorls, rather narrow, somewhat hollowed on the shoulder below the suture. Below the keel their profile-line is straight, but contracted to the suture below. The base (whose upper limit is defined by a very slight angulation) is conical, drawn out pretty much in the axial line into a long, narrowish, cylindrical, strong, and slightly reverted aperture. The suture is a rather minute, sharp, somewhat irregular line, which does not at all follow the spiral markings, but crosses these up and down in an unusually irregular manner. It is well defined by the concave hollow formed by the contraction of the whorls above and below it. The aperture is club-shaped, being somewhat angularly ovate above (with a sharpish point at the top and an angulation at the keel), and prolonged below into the somewhat oblique open siphonal canal, which is kept open by the oblique cutting away of the columella. The outer lip is sharp, but strong. It leaves the body at an acute angle and retreats towards the right to form the sinus, which is open and near but not immediately at the body: from the sinus the lip-edge advances with a strong forward convexity to the point of the siphonal canal. Laterally it is also rather convex, but is contracted into the aperture, along the edge of which it is pretty straight with a somewhat oblique direction towards the left, and here it is patulous. The inner lip is porcellanous, smooth, narrow, cut off, and slightly twisted in front, and running out at the point to a sharp edge along the siphonal canal, the point of which is then rounded and patulous.

== Distribution ==
This species occurs in the Atlantic Ocean off Northeast Brazil
