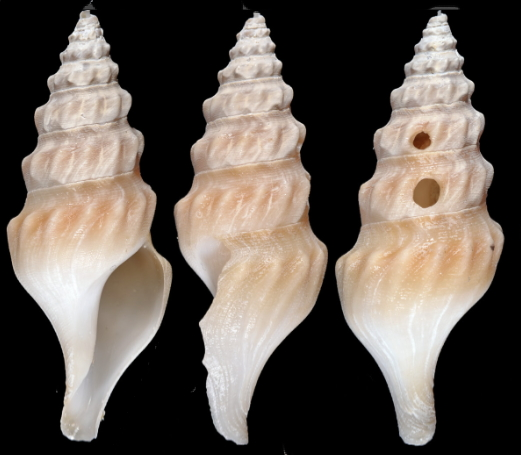
- Shell of Leucosyrinx placaisae (holotype)

Scientific classification
- Kingdom: Animalia
- Phylum: Mollusca
- Class: Gastropoda
- Subclass: Caenogastropoda
- Order: Neogastropoda
- Superfamily: Conoidea
- Family: Pseudomelatomidae
- Genus: Leucosyrinx
- Species: L. placaisae

Binomial name
- Leucosyrinx placaisae Kantor, Fedosov & Puillandre, 2025

= Leucosyrinx placaisae =

Species of gastropod

Leucosyrinx placaisae is a species of sea snail, a marine gastropod mollusk in the family Pseudomelatomidae, the turrids and allies.

== Description ==
The length of the shell attains 10.4 mm, its diameter 3.6 mm.

(Original description) The slender shell is medium-sized and fusiform, with a medium-high spire and a light yellow‑orange coloration; the shell base and siphonal canal are somewhat lighter than the rest of the shell. The protoconch is missing. The six and a half remaining teleoconch whorls are distinctly angular at the shoulder, and the subsutural ramp is strongly concave on all whorls. The suture is distinct and shallowly impressed.

The body whorl bears 15 strong, oblique axial folds on and below the shoulder, and the penultimate whorl bears 12 such folds. These folds fade on the subsutural ramp, reach the lower suture on the teleoconch whorls, and extend to the periphery of the body whorl and onto the upper part of the shell base.

The spiral sculpture is relatively distinct and consists of slightly sinuous cords of similar width that cover the entire shell surface, including the subsutural ramp; the interspaces between the cords are narrower than the cords themselves. There are 10 cords on the subsutural ramp of the body whorl.

The shell base is moderately convex and rapidly narrows toward a medium‑long, weakly curving siphonal canal. The aperture is narrow‑oval and poorly differentiated from the canal. The columellar and parietal callus is thin and of the same color as the rest of the shell. A moderately deep, subsutural, broadly arcuate anal sinus extends across the subsutural ramp and is confluent with the large forward extension of the outer lip. The operculum is oval and leaf‑shaped, with a terminal nucleus.

The radula bears duplex marginal teeth approximately 250 µm in length, corresponding to 4.6% of the aperture length excluding the canal. The major limb is narrowly lanceolate and slightly curved. The accessory limb is nearly twice as narrow, measures about 0.75 of the total tooth length, and is inserted into a shallow but distinct socket on the dorsal side of the major limb.

== Distribution ==
This marine species occurs on the Walters Shoal, Indian Ocean at depths between 1588 m and 1714 m.
