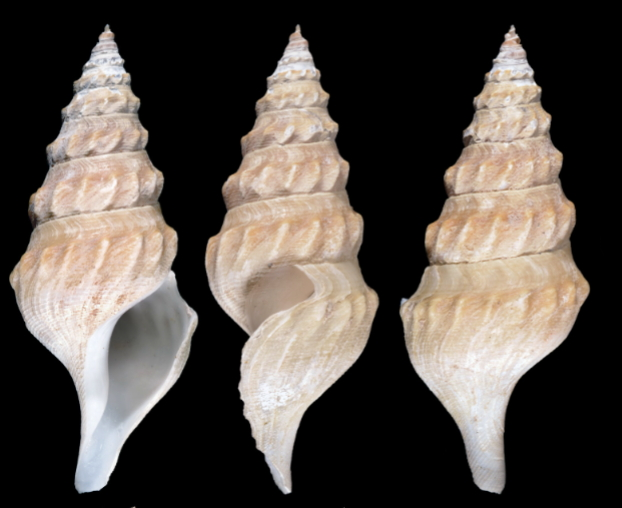
- Shell of Leucosyrinx quinetae (holotype)

Scientific classification
- Kingdom: Animalia
- Phylum: Mollusca
- Class: Gastropoda
- Subclass: Caenogastropoda
- Order: Neogastropoda
- Superfamily: Conoidea
- Family: Pseudomelatomidae
- Genus: Leucosyrinx
- Species: L. quinetae

Binomial name
- Leucosyrinx quinetae Kantor, Fedosov & Puillandre, 2025

= Leucosyrinx quinetae =

Species of gastropod

Leucosyrinx quinetae is a species of sea snail, a marine gastropod mollusk in the family Pseudomelatomidae, the turrids and allies.

== Description ==
The length of the shell attains 54.1 mm, its diameter 21.1 mm. The species can reach a shell length of 60 mm.

(Original description) The large shell is broadly fusiform, thin but strong, with a medium-high spire and covered by a thin yellowish periostracum; the underlying coloration is greyish-olive, with a slightly lighter siphonal canal. The protoconch and upper teleoconch whorls are missing in the holotype, and the preserved portion consists of slightly more than seven whorls. The teleoconch whorls are distinctly angled at the shoulder and bear a concave subsutural ramp on all whorls. The suture is distinct, shallow, and impressed.

The body whorl carries 19 strong, oblique, and narrow axial folds, and the penultimate whorl carries 14 such folds. These folds fade on the subsutural ramp but reach the lower suture on all whorls; on the body whorl they extend to the periphery and onto the shell base. On the last and penultimate whorls, the interspaces between the folds are nearly twice as broad as the folds themselves.

The spiral sculpture is distinct and consists of low, slightly wavy cords of similar size that cover the entire shell, including the subsutural ramp. On the ramp, the cords are less pronounced and more widely spaced than on the shoulder and shell base. The broadest interspaces between the cords are equal to or wider than the cords themselves. Numerous thin but indistinct growth lines are present.

The shell base is rounded and strongly convex, then rapidly constricts and passes into a long, rather narrow, straight siphonal canal. The aperture is moderately broad, elongate-oval, and poorly differentiated from the siphonal canal; the inner lip is weakly concave. The columellar and parietal areas are covered by a narrow, distinct white callus. A deep, subsutural, broadly arcuate anal sinus extends across the subsutural ramp and is confluent with the large forward extension of the outer lip.

The radulae are very similar in both examined specimens. They are rather long and comprise about 35 rows of teeth, of which 7–8 are nascent. The marginal teeth are duplex and measure approximately 410–620 µm in length, corresponding to 3.1–3.4% of the aperture length excluding the canal. The major limb is narrowly lanceolate in dorsal view and strongly curved. The accessory limb accounts for about half of the tooth width, measures about 0.75 of the total tooth length, and is inserted into a distinct socket on the dorsal side of the major limb.

== Distribution ==
This marine species occurs in the South China Sea at a depths between 1634 m to 1707 m.
