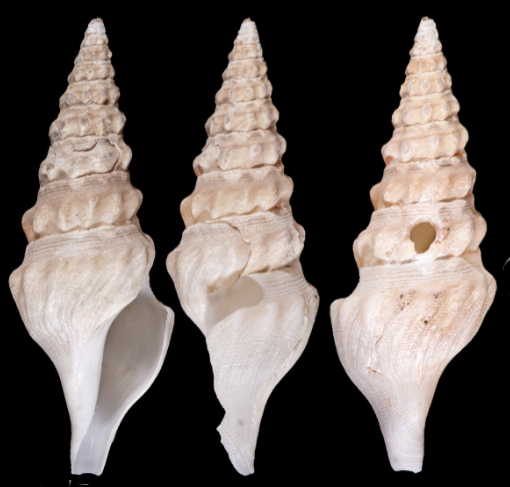
- Shell of Leucosyrinx modicae (holotype)

Scientific classification
- Kingdom: Animalia
- Phylum: Mollusca
- Class: Gastropoda
- Subclass: Caenogastropoda
- Order: Neogastropoda
- Superfamily: Conoidea
- Family: Pseudomelatomidae
- Genus: Leucosyrinx
- Species: L. modicae

Binomial name
- Leucosyrinx modicae Kantor, Fedosov & Puillandre, 2025

= Leucosyrinx modicae =

Species of gastropod

Leucosyrinx modicae is a species of sea snail, a marine gastropod mollusk in the family Pseudomelatomidae, the turrids and allies.

== Description ==
The length of the shell attains 31.8 mm, its diameter 11.3 mm.

(Original description) The thin and fragile shell is medium-sized. it is biconical in shape, with a high spire and a very light yellowish coloration that is nearly white. It comprises about nine teleoconch whorls that are distinctly and roundly angled at the shoulder and bear a strongly concave subsutural ramp on all whorls. The protoconch in the holotype is missing and the uppermost teleoconch whorls are strongly eroded. The suture is distinct and impressed.

The last and penultimate whorls carry 13–14 strong, oblique axial folds. These folds fade on the subsutural ramp, reach the lower suture, and extend down to the shell base. On the last and penultimate whorls, the interspaces between the folds are 1.5–2 times broader than the folds themselves.

The spiral sculpture is very distinct and consists of low, slightly wavy cords of generally similar width (except on the subsutural ramp) that cover the entire shell surface and are particularly evident on the shoulder and across the axial folds. The interspaces between the cords are narrower than the cords in most cases, and only between a few cords do the interspaces equal or slightly exceed the cord width. On the subsutural ramp, the cords are distinct and vary markedly in width, sometimes being nearly twice as broad as those on and below the shoulder; there are nine cords on the subsutural ramp of the body whorl and seven on that of the penultimate whorl. Numerous thin but distinct growth lines are present.

The shell base is rounded and moderately convex, gradually constricting and passing into a medium-long, straight siphonal canal. The aperture is narrow and elongate-oval and is poorly differentiated from the siphonal canal; the inner lip is weakly convex. The columellar and parietal areas are covered by a narrow, distinct white callus. A deep, subsutural, broadly arcuate anal sinus extends across the subsutural ramp and is confluent with the large forward extension of the outer lip.

The radula is typical of the genus. The marginal teeth are duplex and measure approximately 280 µm in length, corresponding to 4.7% of the aperture length excluding the canal.

== Distribution ==
This marine species occurs off Southern New Caledonia and the Solomon Islands, at depths between 762 m to 897 m.
