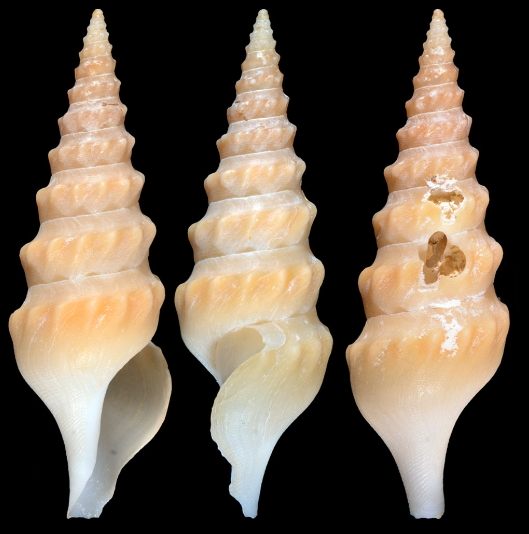
- Shell of Leucosyrinx derzellei (holotype)

Scientific classification
- Kingdom: Animalia
- Phylum: Mollusca
- Class: Gastropoda
- Subclass: Caenogastropoda
- Order: Neogastropoda
- Superfamily: Conoidea
- Family: Pseudomelatomidae
- Genus: Leucosyrinx
- Species: L. derzellei

Binomial name
- Leucosyrinx derzellei Kantor, Fedosov & Puillandre, 2025

= Leucosyrinx derzellei =

Species of gastropod

Leucosyrinx derzellei is a species of sea snail, a marine gastropod mollusk in the family Pseudomelatomidae, the turrids and allies.

== Description ==
(Original description) The length of the shell of the holotype attains 33.3 mm; its diameter 10.5 mm; aperture length (including siphonal canal) 13.2 mm; aperture length (excluding canal) 8.6mm.

The medioum-sized shell is thin, fusiform, with high spire, tan in color, with slightly darker band on shoulder and lighter shell base and siphonal canal. It contains slightly over 10 teleoconch whorls. The protoconch is paucispiral with about 1.75 evenly rounded and micro-shagreened whorls. The protoconch-teleoconch transition is indistinct. It is marked by the emergence of the shoulder keel, smooth initially but soon acquiring axial folds. The teleoconch whorls are roundly angled at the shoulder, with a distinctly concave subsutural ramp. The suture is shallow, impressed, and slightly wavy. There are 14 strong, oblique, broad, and rounded axial folds on the shoulder of the body whorl and 13 on the penultimate whorl. The folds fade on the sharply delimited subsutural ramp, continue towards the lower suture without noticeable weakening, and disappear at the periphery of the whorl. They remain well developed throughout the teleoconch, and the interspaces are slightly broader than the folds.

The shell base is slightly convex and gently curved, passing smoothly into a moderately long, straight siphonal canal. The aperture is narrow, elongate-oval, and only weakly differentiated from the canal. The inner lip is nearly straight. The columellar and parietal regions bear a narrow but distinct callus. The anal sinus is moderately deep, subsutural, and broadly arcuate, extending across the subsutural ramp and confluent with the prominent forward projection of the outer lip.

Radula: The marginal teeth are duplex, approximately 230 μm long, relatively short (3.7% of the aperture length excluding the canal), and rather broad. The major limb is broadly lanceolate in dorsal view and distinctly curved. The accessory limb is more than twice as narrow as the major limb, measures approximately 75% of the total tooth length, and is inserted into a distinct, deep socket on the dorsal side of the major limb.

== Distribution ==
This marine species occurs off South Madagascar at depths between 729 m and 943 m.
