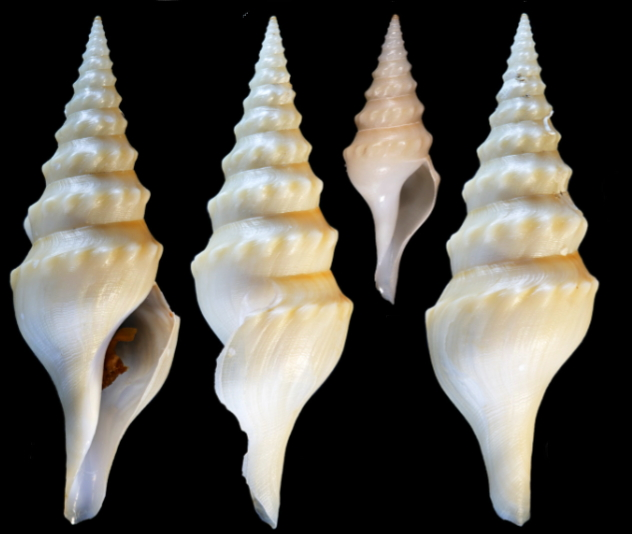
- Shell of Leucosyrinx herosae (holotype)

Scientific classification
- Kingdom: Animalia
- Phylum: Mollusca
- Class: Gastropoda
- Subclass: Caenogastropoda
- Order: Neogastropoda
- Superfamily: Conoidea
- Family: Pseudomelatomidae
- Genus: Leucosyrinx
- Species: L. herosae

Binomial name
- Leucosyrinx herosae Kantor, Fedosov & Puillandre, 2025

= Leucosyrinx herosae =

Species of gastropod

Leucosyrinx herosae is a species of sea snail, a marine gastropod mollusk in the family Pseudomelatomidae, the turrids and allies.

== Description ==
The length of the shell attains 47.2 mm, its diameter 15.5 mm.

(Original description) The thin but strong shell is medium-sized and glossy. it is fusiform in shape, with a medium-high spire and a uniformly light tan coloration; a narrow, darker subsutural band is present. The protoconch is paucispiral and consists of about 1.5 rounded, light brown whorls; the protoconch–teleoconch transition is indistinct because of erosion of the protoconch, but it is marked by a change in color. The teleoconch consists of 11 whorls that are distinctly and roundly angled at the shoulder and bear a concave subsutural ramp that becomes nearly flat on the body whorl. The suture is distinct, shallow, and impressed.

The body whorl carries 18 strong, oblique, broad, and rounded axial folds, and the penultimate whorl carries 14 such folds. These folds fade on the subsutural ramp, do not reach the lower suture except on the upper whorls, and disappear below the shoulder on the body whorl. On the last and penultimate whorls, the interspaces between the folds are equal to or slightly broader than the folds themselves. The spiral sculpture is moderately developed and consists of distinct, low, rounded, wavy, and narrow cords that extend over the entire shell, including the subsutural ramp; the intervals between the cords are narrower than the cords themselves. Numerous thin growth lines are present.

The shell base is rounded and convex and passes smoothly into a long, straight siphonal canal. The aperture is narrow and elongate-oval and is poorly differentiated from the siphonal canal; the inner lip is nearly straight. The columellar and parietal areas bear a narrow, distinct callus that is of the same color as the remaining part of the body whorl. A deep, subsutural, broadly arcuate anal sinus extends across the subsutural ramp and is confluent with the large forward extension of the outer lip.

The radula consists of about 30 rows of teeth, of which 15 are nascent. The marginal teeth are duplex and measure approximately 300 µm in length, corresponding to 3.2% of the aperture length excluding the canal. The major limb is broadly lanceolate in dorsal view and weakly curved. The accessory limb is narrow, constitutes less than half of the tooth width, measures about 0.8 of the total tooth length, and is inserted into a distinct, deep socket on the dorsal side of the major limb.

== Distribution ==
This marine species occurs in the Bismarck Sea and off Papua New Guinea at depths between 398 m and 620 m.
