= Leucosyrinx climoi =

Scientific classification
- Kingdom: Animalia
- Phylum: Mollusca
- Class: Gastropoda
- Subclass: Caenogastropoda
- Order: Neogastropoda
- Superfamily: Conoidea
- Family: Pseudomelatomidae
- Genus: Leucosyrinx
- Species: L. climoi

Binomial name
- Leucosyrinx climoi Maxwell, 1988

Extinct species of gastropod

Leucosyrinx climoi is an extinct species of sea snail, a marine gastropod mollusk in the family Pseudomelatomidae, the turrids and allies.

== Distribution ==
Fossils of this marine species were found in New Zealand.
