= Leucosyrinx turrita =

Scientific classification
- Kingdom: Animalia
- Phylum: Mollusca
- Class: Gastropoda
- Subclass: Caenogastropoda
- Order: Neogastropoda
- Superfamily: Conoidea
- Family: Pseudomelatomidae
- Genus: Leucosyrinx
- Species: L. turrita

Binomial name
- Leucosyrinx turrita Sysoev, 1990

Synonyms
- Leucosyrinx turritus Sysoev, 1990 (wrong gender agreement of specific epithet)·

Species of gastropod

Leucosyrinx turrita is a species of sea snail, a marine gastropod mollusk in the family Pseudomelatomidae, the turrids and allies.

== Distribution ==
This marine species has been found on the Naska & Sala-i-Gomes Ridges, Southeast Pacific Ocean
