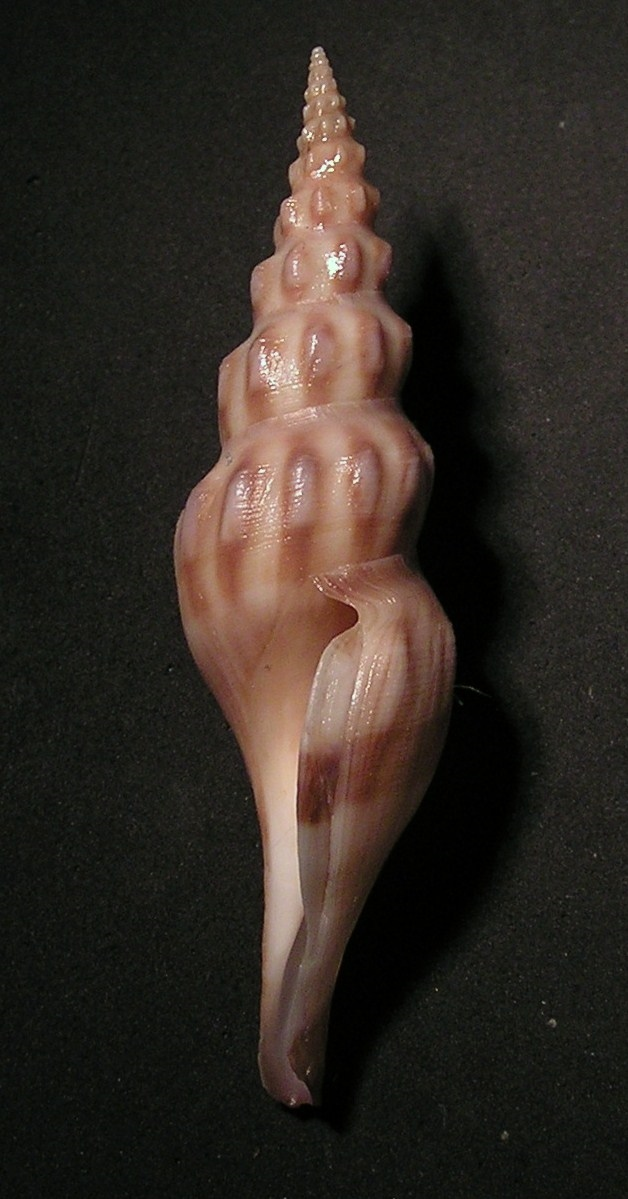
- Shell of Comitas peelae

Scientific classification
- Kingdom: Animalia
- Phylum: Mollusca
- Class: Gastropoda
- Subclass: Caenogastropoda
- Order: Neogastropoda
- Superfamily: Conoidea
- Family: Pseudomelatomidae
- Genus: Comitas; Finlay, 1926

Type species
- † Surcula oamarutica Suter, 1917 (type by original designation)

Species
- See text

Synonyms
- † Comitas (Carinacomitas) A. W. B. Powell, 1942 (junior subjective synonym); Turricula (Comitas) Finlay, 1926

= Comitas =

Genus of gastropods

Comitas is a genus of medium-sized sea snails, which are marine gastropod molluscs in the family Pseudomelatomidae.

== General characteristics ==
The shell is generally large, usually over 50 mm in length, with broad and long axial ribs, always extending to the periphery and sometimes to the shell base. The anal sinus is moderately deep, medium broad U-shaped, on the subsutural ramp and occupying the lower part of the subsutural ramp, not on all its width, so that the deepest point is closer to shoulder than to suture. Correspondingly the sinus line in its upper part is prosocline, but convex.

Species of Comitas have a very distinctive radula, reliably distinguishing them from all other conoideans.

== Species and subspecies ==
Species and subspecies (indented) in the genus Comitas include:

- † Comitas abnormis L. C. King, 1933
- Comitas albicincta (A. Adams & Reeve, 1850)
- † Comitas aldingensis Powell, 1944
- † Comitas allani Powell, 1942
- † Comitas atsukoae (Kamada, 1962)
- † Comitas bilix Marwick, 1931
- Comitas cassandrae T. Cossignani, 2026
- † Comitas clarae (G.F. Harris, 1897)
- † Comitas crenularoides (Pritchard, 1896)
- † Comitas cudmorei D. C. Long, 1981
- † Comitas declivis Powell, 1931
- † Comitas dijki (K. Martin, 1884)
- † Comitas dimidiatoaffinis Vera-Peláez, 2022
- Comitas elegans Sysoev, 1996
- Comitas ensyuensis (Shikama & Hayashi in Shikama, 1977)
- † Comitas fusiformis (Hutton, 1877)
- † Comitas gagei Maxwell, 1988
- Comitas galatheae Powell, 1969
- † Comitas habei Shuto, 1961
- Comitas hayashii (Shikama, 1977)
- † Comitas hillegondae (K. Martin, 1931)
- Comitas ilariae Bozzetti, 1991
- † Comitas imperfecta L. C. King, 1933
- † Comitas jani (Bellardi, 1847)
- Comitas kaderlyi (Lischke, 1872)
- † Comitas kaipara Laws, 1939
- Comitas kamakurana (Pilsbry, 1895)
- † Comitas kenneti Beu, 1970
- † Comitas korytnicensis (Bałuk, 2003)
- Comitas kuroharai (Oyama, 1962)
- † Comitas latescens (Hutton, 1873)
- † Comitas latiaxialis (P. Marshall, 1918)
- Comitas laura (Thiele, 1925)
- Comitas lurida (A. Adams & Reeve, 1850)
- Comitas malayana (Thiele, 1925)
- Comitas miyazakiensis Shuto, 1961 (uncertain > unassessed)
- Comitas murrawolga (Garrard, 1961)
- † Comitas nana Maxwell, 1988
- †Comitas nausorensis Ladd, 1982
- Comitas ngocngai Thach, 2025
- Comitas obliquicosta (E. von Martens, 1901)
- Comitas obliquicosta (Martens, 1901)
- Comitas onokeana King, 1933
  - Comitas onokeana vivens Dell, 1956
- Comitas pachycercus Sysoev & Bouchet, 2001
- Comitas parvifusiformis Li & Li, 2008
- Comitas peelae Bozzetti, 1993
- † Comitas pseudoclarae A.W.B. Powell, 1944
- Comitas raybaudii Bozzetti, 1994
- † Comitas recticosta (Bellardi, 1847)
- Comitas rex Sysoev, 1997
- † Comitas rostrata (Solander, 1766)
- Comitas rotundata (Watson, 1881)
- Comitas saldanhae (Barnard, 1958)
- † Comitas salebrosa (G.F. Harris, 1897)
- † Comitas silicicola Darragh, 2017
- † Comitas sobrina (M. Yokoyama, 1923 )
- † Comitas spencerensis E.J. Moore, 1962 (uncertain, unassessed)
- Comitas stolida (Hinds, 1843)
- † Comitas subcarinapex Powell, 1942
- † Comitas terrisae Vella, 1954
- † Comitas torquayensis Powell, 1944
- Comitas trailli (Hutton, 1873)
- † Comitas vegai Vera-Peláez, 2022
- Comitas vezo Bozzetti, 2001
- Comitas vezzaroi Cossignani, 2016
- † Comitas waihaoensis Powell, 1942
- † Comitas williamsi Marwick, 1965
- Comitas wynyardensis (G.B. Pritchard, 1896)

== Synonyms ==
- Comitas aemula Angas, 1877: synonym of Comitas trailli (Hutton, 1873)
- Comitas aequatorialis (Thiele, 1925): synonym of Leucosyrinx aequatorialis Thiele, 1925 (superseded combination)
- Comitas anteridion (Watson, 1881): synonym of Leucosyrinx anteridion (R. B. Watson, 1881)
- Comitas arcana (E. A. Smith, 1899): synonym of Leucosyrinx arcana (E. A. Smith, 1899)
- Comitas bolognai Bozzetti, 2001: synonym of Leucosyrinx bolognai (Bozzetti, 2001)
- Comitas breviplicata (E. A. Smith, 1899): synonym of Leucosyrinx breviplicata (E. A. Smith, 1899)
- Comitas chuni (von Martens, 1902): synonym of Spergo chuni (E. von Martens, 1901)
- Comitas claviforma Kosuge, 1992 is a basionym for Leucosyrinx claviforma (Kosuge, 1992)
- Comitas curviplicata Sysoev, 1996: synonym of Leucosyrinx curviplicata (Sysoev, 1996) (superseded combination)
- Comitas erica (Thiele, 1925): synonym of Comispira erica (Thiele, 1925) (superseded combination)
- Comitas eurina (E. A. Smith, 1899): synonym of Leucosyrinx eurina (E. A. Smith, 1899)
- Comitas exstructa (von Martens, 1904): synonym of Comispira exstructa (E. von Martens, 1904) (superseded combination)
- Comitas granuloplicata Kosuge, 1992: synonym of Leucosyrinx granuloplicata (Kosuge, 1992)
- Comitas halicyria (Melvill, 1904): synonym of Leucosyrinx halicyria (Melvill, 1904)
- Comitas kaderleyi Lischke, 1872: synonym of Comitas kaderlyi (Lischke, 1872)
- Comitas kayalensis Dey, 1962: synonym of † Turricula kayalensis Dey, 1962
- Comitas kirai Powell, 1969: synonym of Leucosyrinx kirai (A. W. B. Powell, 1969) (superseded combination)
- Comitas luzonica Powell, 1969: synonym of Leucosyrinx luzonica (Powell, 1969)
- Comitas makiyamai Shuto, 1961: synonym of † Cosmasyrinx makiyamai Shuto, 1961
- Comitas margaritae (E. A. Smith, 1904): synonym of Leucosyrinx margaritae (E. A. Smith, 1904)
- Comitas melvilli (Schepman, 1913): synonym of Leucosyrinx melvilli (Schepman, 1913)
- Comitas oahuensis Powell, 1969: synonym of Kuroshioturris oahuensis (A. W. B. Powell, 1969) (superseded combination)
- Comitas obtusigemmata (Schepman, 1913): synonym of Comispira obtusigemmata (Schepman, 1913) (unaccepted > superseded combination)
- Comitas opulenta (Thiele, 1925): synonym of Tropidoturris scitecostata (G. B. Sowerby III, 1903)
- Comitas pagodaeformis (Schepman, 1913): synonym of Leucosyrinx pagodaeformis (Schepman, 1913) (superseded combination)
- Comitas paupera (Watson, 1881): synonym of Leucosyrinx paupera (R. B. Watson, 1881)
- Comitas powelli Rehder & Ladd, 1973: synonym of Leucosyrinx powelli (Rehder & Ladd, 1973)
- Comitas saudesae Cossignani, 2018: synonym of Comispira saudesae (Cossigniani, 2018) (superseded combination)
- † Comitas sobrinaeformis S. Nomura, 1937: synonym of † Turricula sobrinaeformis Nomura, 1937
- Comitas subcorpulenta Smith, 1894: synonym of:Borsonia symbiotes subcorpulenta (Smith, 1894)
- Comitas subsuturalis (von Martens, 1901): synonym of Comispira subsuturalis (E. von Martens, 1901) (superseded combination)
- Comitas suluensis Powell, 1969: synonym of Sibogasyrinx suluensis (A. W. B. Powell, 1969) (unaccepted > superseded combination)
- Comitas suratensis (Thiele, 1925): synonym of Leucosyrinx suratensis (Thiele, 1925) (unaccepted > superseded combination)
- Comitas symbiotes (Wood-Mason & Alcock, 1891): synonym of Borsonia symbiotes (Wood-Mason & Alcock, 1891)
- Comitas thisbe (E. A. Smith, 1906): synonym of Leucosyrinx thisbe (E. A. Smith, 1906) (superseded combination)
- Comitas undosa Schepman, 1913: synonym of Leucosyrinx undosa (Schepman, 1913)
- Comitas verrucosa Suter, 1899: synonym of Comitas trailli (Hutton, 1873)
- † Comitas yokoyamai K. Oyama, 1954: synonym of † Cryptogemma yokoyamai Taki & Oyama, 1954
- Comitas yukiae (Shikama, 1962): synonym of Antiplanes yukiae (Shikama, 1962)
