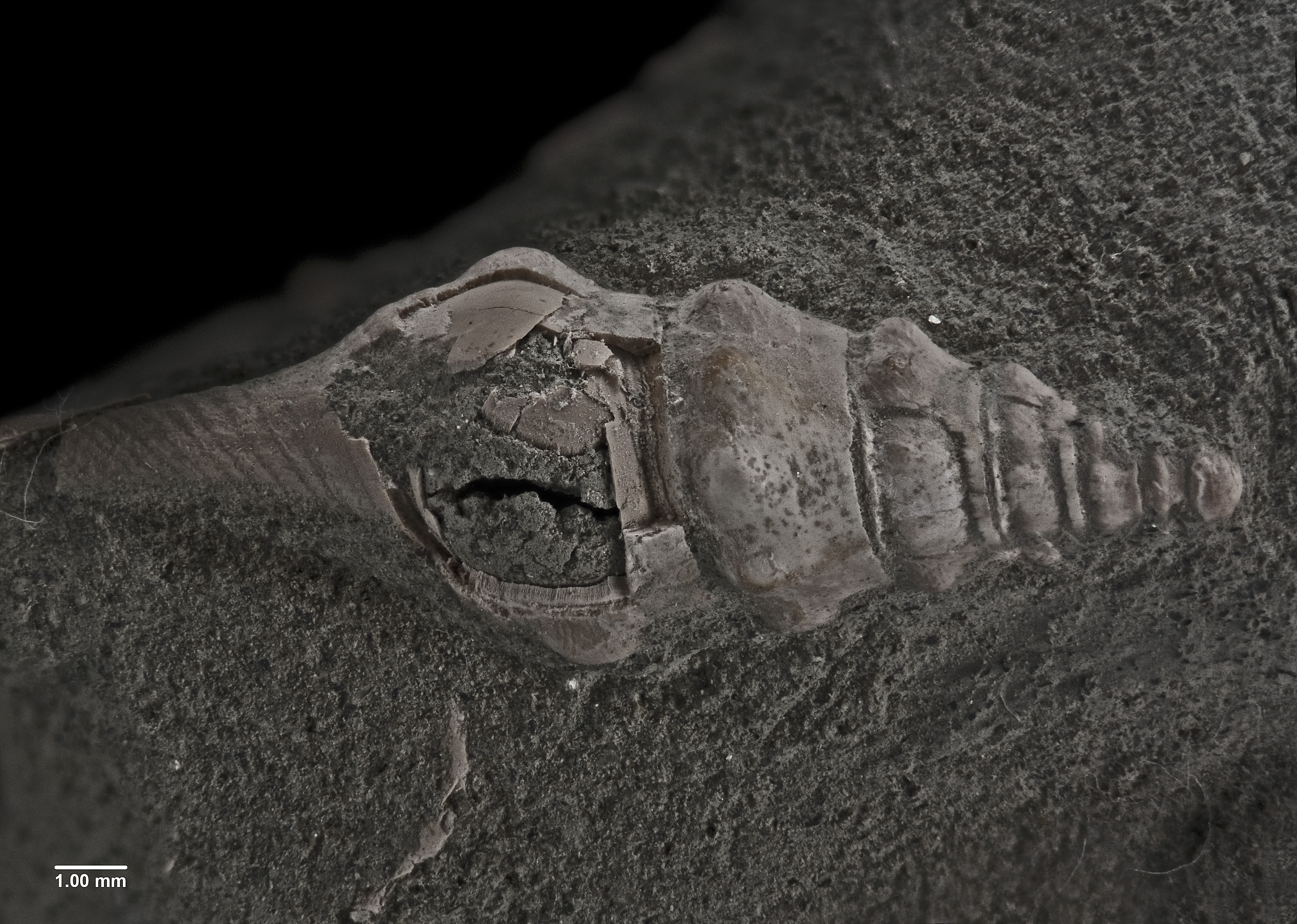
- Holotype from Auckland War Memorial Museum

Scientific classification
- Kingdom: Animalia
- Phylum: Mollusca
- Class: Gastropoda
- Subclass: Caenogastropoda
- Order: Neogastropoda
- Family: Pseudomelatomidae
- Genus: Comitas
- Species: C. declivis

Binomial name
- Comitas declivis A. W. B. Powell, 1931

= Comitas declivis =

Comitas declivis Temporal range: 3.70 Ma

Extinct species of gastropod

Comitas declivis is an extinct species of sea snail, a marine gastropod mollusc in the family Pseudomelatomidae. Fossils of the species date to the Waipipian stage (3.70 million years ago) of the late Pliocene in New Zealand, and are known to occur at Waihi Beach near Hāwera, South Taranaki. The species lived in deep waters off the coast of New Zealand.

== Description ==
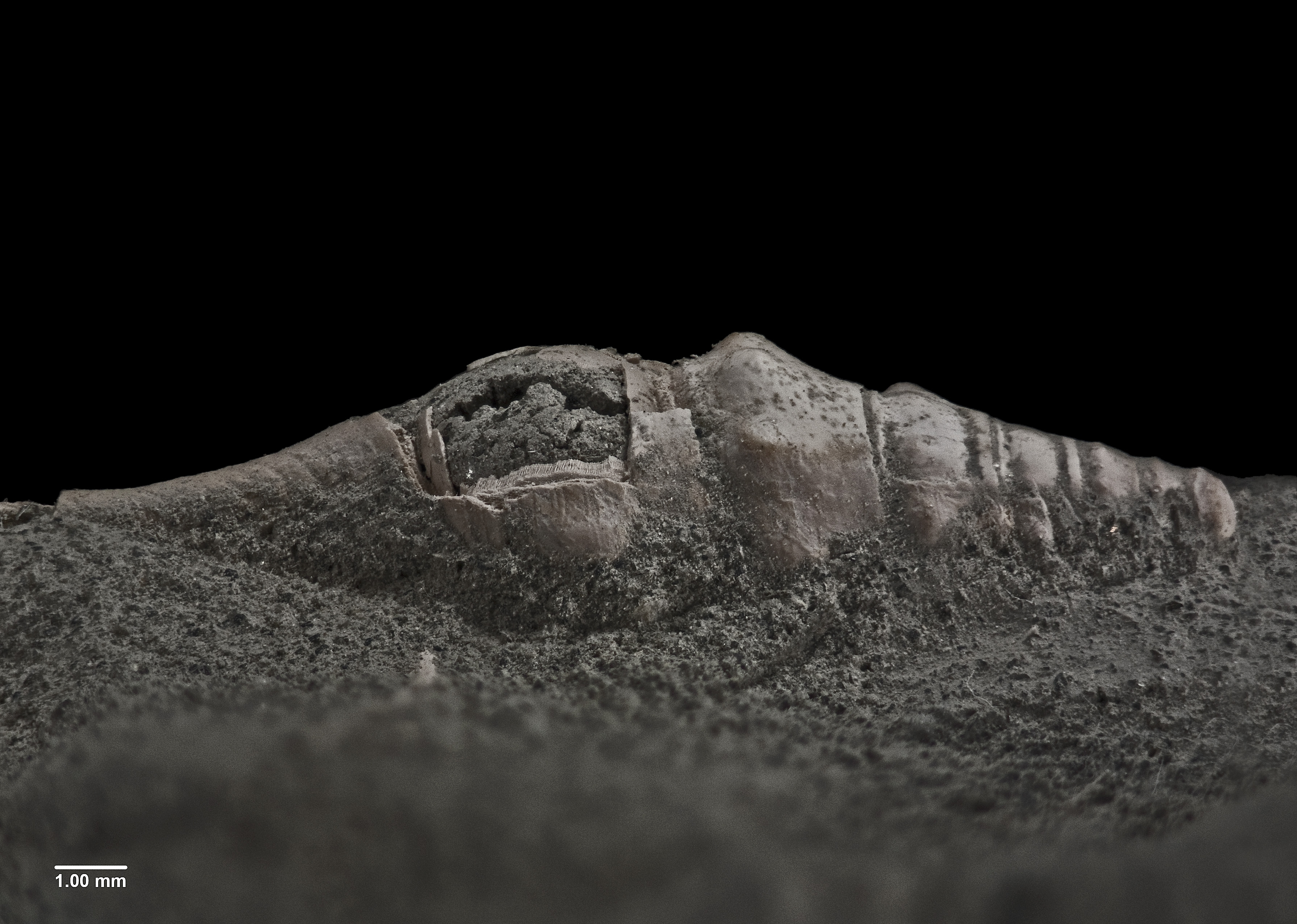
Side view of holotype

In the original description, Powell described the species as follows:

Shell of moderate size, fusiform, with long straight canal and relatively short spire. Aperture plus canal one and a third times height of spire. Protoconch relatively large, of one and a-half smooth, bulbous whorls. Post-nuclear whorls six, subangled below the middle, almost at lower third of whorl-height. Upper slope steep, slightly concave above and below the subangle. Body-whorl rapidly contracted to a long straight canal without a fasciole. Axial sculpture of eleven or twelve strong rounded knobs per whorl, with about equal interspaces. Spiral sculpture obsolete on spire-whorls, but there are about eighteen poorly developed, flattened cords on the lower part of body-whorl and neck of canal. Three of these, situated on the base at a short distance below the nodulous subangle, are a trifle more prominent than the rest. Suture with a slight bulge below, but not definitely submargined. Outer-lip with a deep angular sinus, its apex at about the middle of the shoulder.

The holotype of the species has a height of 19.0 mm (0.75 in) and a diameter of 6.3 mm (0.25 in). Similar in appearance to C. bilix, the species can be identified due to being more elongated, and having less prominent basal cords.

== Taxonomy ==
The species was first described by A. W. B. Powell in 1931. The holotype was collected in January 1931 by Powell from near the mouth of Waihi Stream, Hāwera, South Taranaki. It is held in the collections of Auckland War Memorial Museum.

== Ecology ==
C. declivis was a species that lived in deep waters.

== Distribution ==
This extinct marine species occurs in late Pliocene Waipipian stage fossils in New Zealand, including the Tangahoe Formation.
