= C. rex =

C. rex may refer to:

- Cattleya rex, an orchid species
- Chrysiptera rex, a damselfish species from the Indo-West Pacific
- Clytoceyx rex, the shovel-billed kookaburra or shovel-billed kingfisher, a large bird species endemic to New Guinea
- Comitas rex, a sea snail species

== Dinosaur Specimens ==
C. rex, the largest specimen of Tyrannosaurus rex

== See also ==
- Rex (disambiguation)
