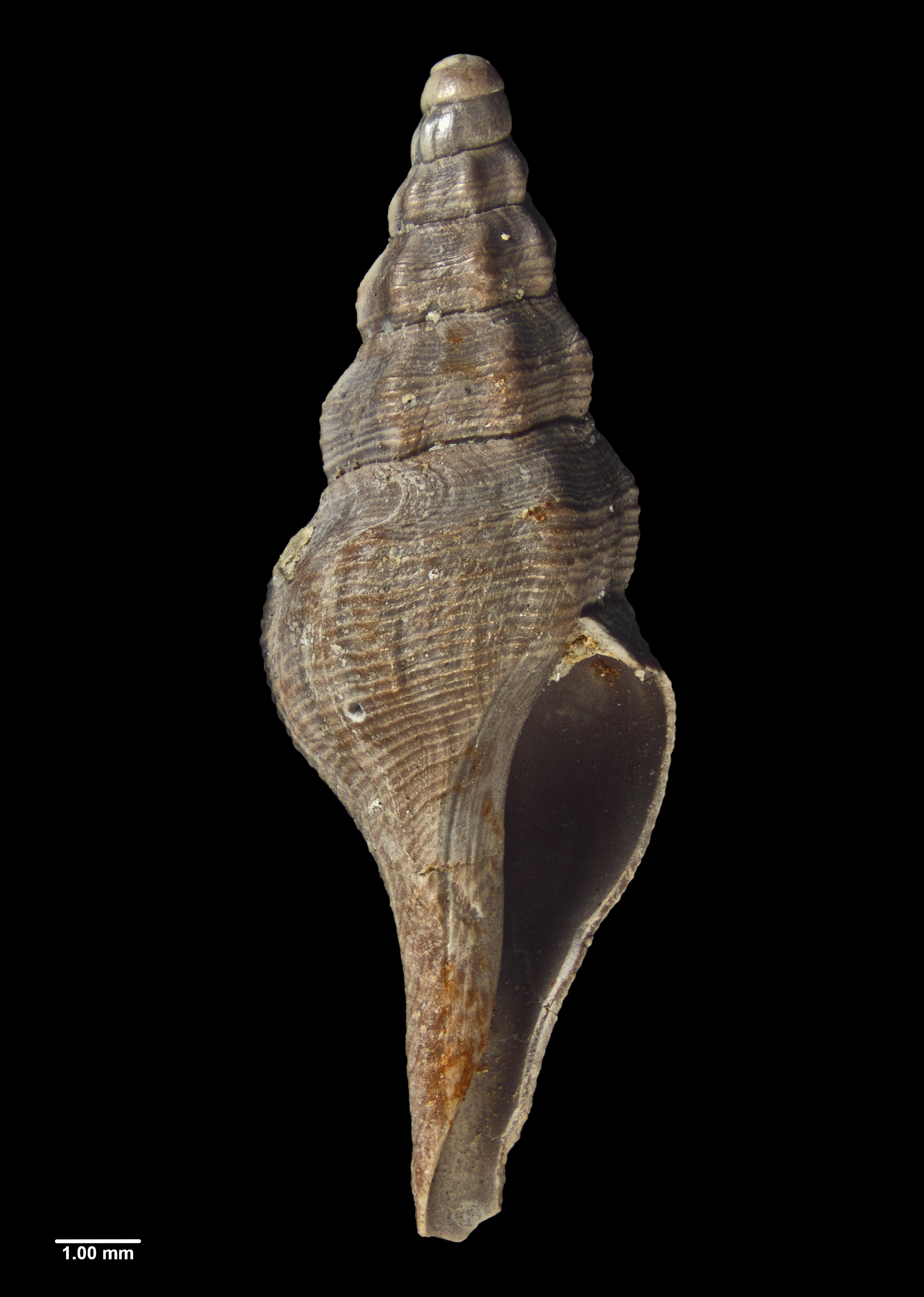
- Holotype from Auckland War Memorial Museum

Scientific classification
- Kingdom: Animalia
- Phylum: Mollusca
- Class: Gastropoda
- Subclass: Caenogastropoda
- Order: Neogastropoda
- Family: Pseudomelatomidae
- Genus: Comitas
- Species: †C. pseudoclarae

Binomial name
- †Comitas pseudoclarae Powell, 1944

= Comitas pseudoclarae =

Comitas pseudoclarae Temporal range: late Oligocene

Extinct species of gastropod

Comitas pseudoclarae is an extinct species of sea snail, a marine gastropod mollusc in the family Pseudomelatomidae. Fossils of the species date to the late Oligocene, and occurs in the strata of the Port Phillip Basin of Victoria, Australia.

== Description ==
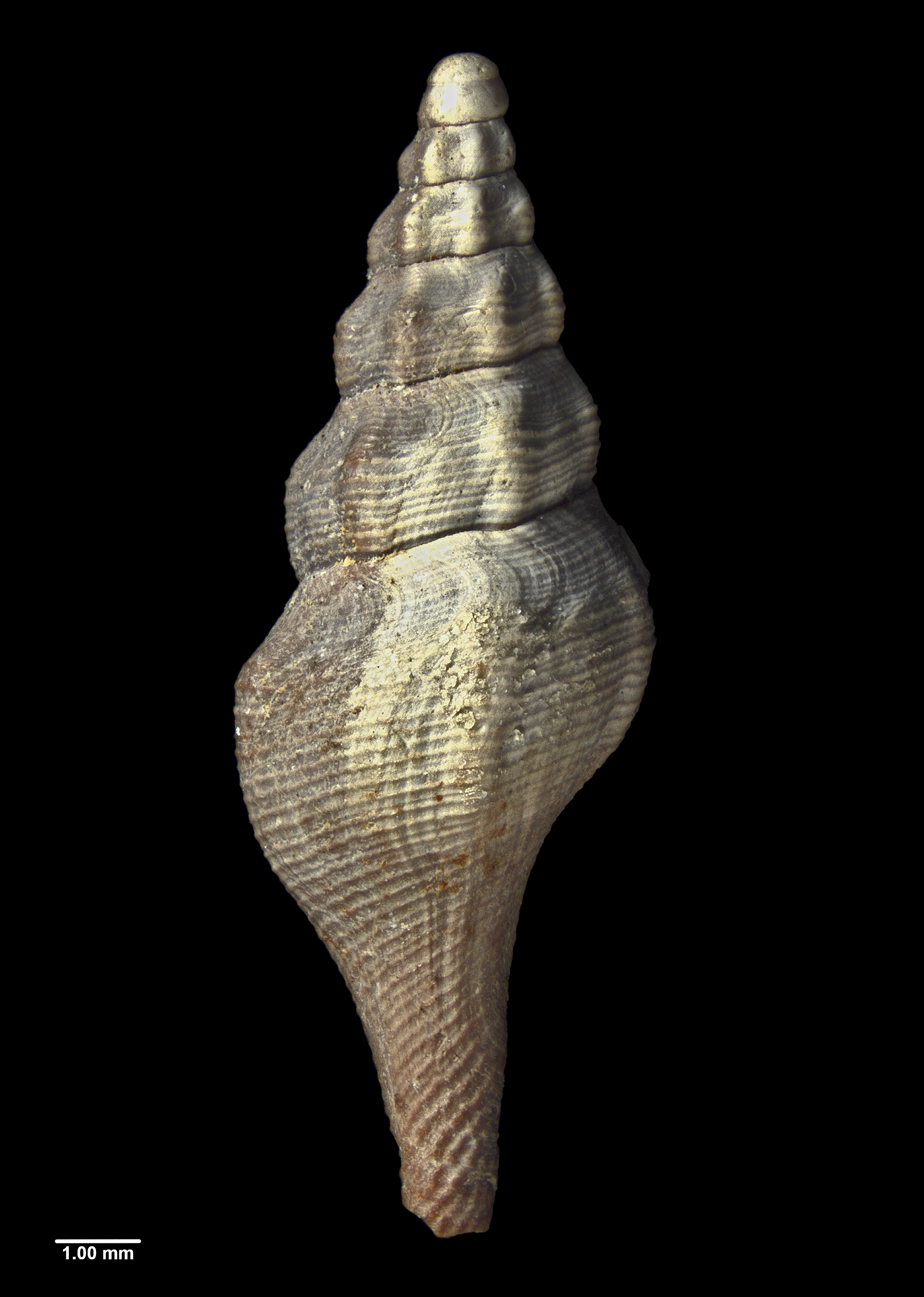
Reverse view of holotype

In the original description, Powell described the species as follows:

Shell almost inseparable, in its adult facies, from C. (Carinacomitas) clarae, but with the typical two-whorled, smooth papillate protoconch of true Comitas. The only adult feature that readily separates pseudo-clarae from clarae is the more rapidly contracted base, and resultant longer anterior canal.
Whorls sculptured with numerous narrow spiral cords, and dense weak lirations on the shoulder, as well as distant, low, broadly rounded axials, 6-7 per whorl, which rapidly become obsolete both on the shoulder and on the base. Spire-whorls with 10-12 lirae on the shoulder and 4-5 primary cords, with intermediates, from the peripheral angle to the lower suture. About 40 spirals on body-whorl from angle to anterior end. Spirals relatively strong both near the angle and at the anterior end.

The holotype of the species measures 14 mm (0.55 in) in height and 5 mm (0.20 in) in diameter. It can be distinguished from other Australian fossil Comitas species due to the number of axial ribs, protoconch details and relative size.

== Taxonomy ==
The species was first described by A.W.B. Powell in 1944. The holotype was collected from Torquay, Victoria, at an unknown date prior to 1944, and is held by the Auckland War Memorial Museum.

== Distribution ==
This extinct marine species dates to the late Oligocene, and occurs in the strata of the Port Phillip Basin of Victoria, Australia, from the Jan Juc Formation.
