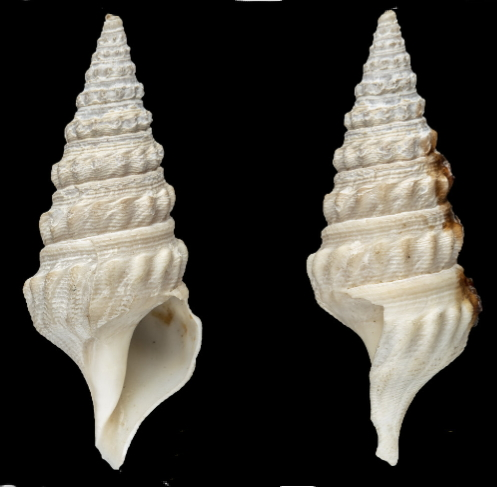
- Shell of Leucosyrinx eurina (paratype at NHMUK)

Scientific classification
- Kingdom: Animalia
- Phylum: Mollusca
- Class: Gastropoda
- Subclass: Caenogastropoda
- Order: Neogastropoda
- Superfamily: Conoidea
- Family: Pseudomelatomidae
- Genus: Leucosyrinx
- Species: L. eurina

Binomial name
- Leucosyrinx eurina (E. A. Smith, 1899)

Synonyms
- Comitas eurina (E. A. Smith, 1899); Pleurotoma (Surcula) eurina E. A. Smith, 1899 (original combination); Pleurotoma eurina E. A. Smith, 1899 (original combination)

= Leucosyrinx eurina =

Species of gastropod

Leucosyrinx eurina is a species of sea snail, a marine gastropod mollusc in the family Pseudomelatomidae.

== Description ==
The length of the shell varies between 31 mm and 62 mm.

The white, slender shell has a fusiform shape It contains 9 -10 whorls. The whorls are angulated in the middle, concave in the upper portion and convex below. The whorls are bordered below the suture with a thickened margin. The longitudinal ribs are nodose. The plicae are delicate and oblique. The body whorl contains about 16 oblique ribs that become in the lower part attenuate and then almost obsolete. The white aperture measures about 3/7 the total length. The outer lip is tenuous and widely sinuate. The smooth columella is almost upright. The broad siphonal canal is oblique.

The shell of L. eurina is unusual for the genus because it bears a distinct subsutural spiral fold, a feature somewhat reminiscent of that observed in Leucosyrinx thisbe. At the same time, the anal sinus is subsutural and occupies the entire subsutural ramp, which supports transferring the species from Comitas to Leucosyrinx.

== Distribution ==
This marine species occurs off Madagascar, Borneo and south of India at a depth of 878 m.
