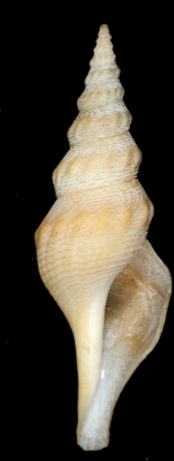
- Shell of Leucosyrinx kirai (holotype)

Scientific classification
- Kingdom: Animalia
- Phylum: Mollusca
- Class: Gastropoda
- Subclass: Caenogastropoda
- Order: Neogastropoda
- Superfamily: Conoidea
- Family: Pseudomelatomidae
- Genus: Leucosyrinx
- Species: L. kirai

Binomial name
- Leucosyrinx kirai Powell, 1969

Synonyms
- Comitas kirai A. W. B. Powell, 1969 superseded combination

= Leucosyrinx kirai =

Species of gastropod

Leucosyrinx kirai is a species of sea snail, a marine gastropod mollusc in the family Pseudomelatomidae, the turrids and allies.

== Description ==
The length of the shell varies between 20 mm and 30 mm.

The species is very similar to Leucosyrinx breviplicata in overall shell shape and, in particular, in its spiral sculpture. It is unusually small for a Comitas (reaching only 40 mm), and in its general shell characters it matches species of Leucosyrinx, including a subsutural anal sinus that occupies the entire subsutural ramp.

Therefore, it is provisionally transferred it to Leucosyrinx, pending additional data on radular morphology. Although its shell characters could justify treating it as a synonym of L. breviplicata, it occurs at much shallower depths (50–400 m; Hasegawa et al. 2000: 633), which argues for maintaining it as a separate species for the time being.

The species was originally described by New Zealand malacologist A. W. B. Powell in 1969 under the scientific name Comitas kirai. Its type specimen, the specimen used to establish the species, originates from Kii, Japan, and is held in the collections of the Academy of Natural Sciences of Drexel University in Philadelphia. In a 2025 revision of Indo-Pacific species of Leucosyrinx, Yuri I. Kantor, Alexander Fedosov and Philippe Bouchet reassigned the species to Leucosyrinx on the basis of its shell characteristics, while noting that further anatomical and molecular evidence would help clarify its relationship to closely related species.

== Distribution ==
This marine species occurs off the Philippines, Japan and in the South China Sea.
