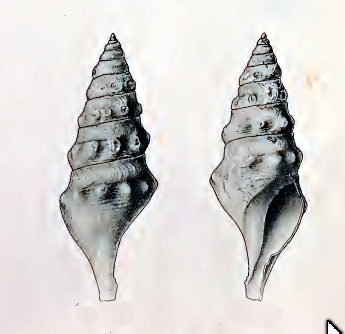
- Original image of a shell of Comitas arcana

Scientific classification
- Kingdom: Animalia
- Phylum: Mollusca
- Class: Gastropoda
- Subclass: Caenogastropoda
- Order: Neogastropoda
- Superfamily: Conoidea
- Family: Pseudomelatomidae
- Genus: Comitas
- Species: C. arcana

Binomial name
- Comitas arcana E. A. Smith, 1899

Synonyms
- Pleurotoma (Surcula) arcana E. A. Smith, 1899 (original combination)

= Comitas arcana =

Species of gastropod

Comitas rotundata is a species of sea snail, a marine gastropod mollusc in the family Pseudomelatomidae, the turrids and allies.

== Description ==
The length of the shell attains 25 mm, its diameter 9 mm.

The dark white shell has a fusiform shape, and an acuminate, turreted spire. It contains about 10 whorls. The upper portion of the whorl is declining and concave. Below the whorls are angulated and tuberculated at the angles. These rather sharp tubercles number 12 on the body whorl. The transverse striae upon the upper concave portion of the whorls are finer and less conspicuous than those below the row of tubercles. The aperture is narrowed in front and measures about ½ the total length. The columella is a little oblique and is callous. The outer lip is tenuous, widely sinuate and prominently arcuate in the middle.

== Distribution ==
This marine species occurs off Southwest India and the Andamans.
