= Mangelia opulenta =

Scientific classification
- Kingdom: Animalia
- Phylum: Mollusca
- Class: Gastropoda
- Subclass: Caenogastropoda
- Order: Neogastropoda
- Superfamily: Conoidea
- Family: Mangeliidae
- Genus: Mangelia
- Species: M. opulenta

Binomial name
- Mangelia opulenta J. Thiele, 1925

Species of gastropod

Mangelia opulenta is a species of sea snail, a marine gastropod mollusc in the family Mangeliidae.

== Description ==
The species described and illustrated by Thiele (1925) definitely belongs to Mangeliidae P. Fischer, 1883. Bozzetti (1993 without any discussion and undoubtedly erroneously attributed the species to Comitas. Therefore, the original binomen of the species is here reinstated, although the generic position of the species requires clarification.

== Distribution ==
This marine species occurs off Padang, Sumatra.
