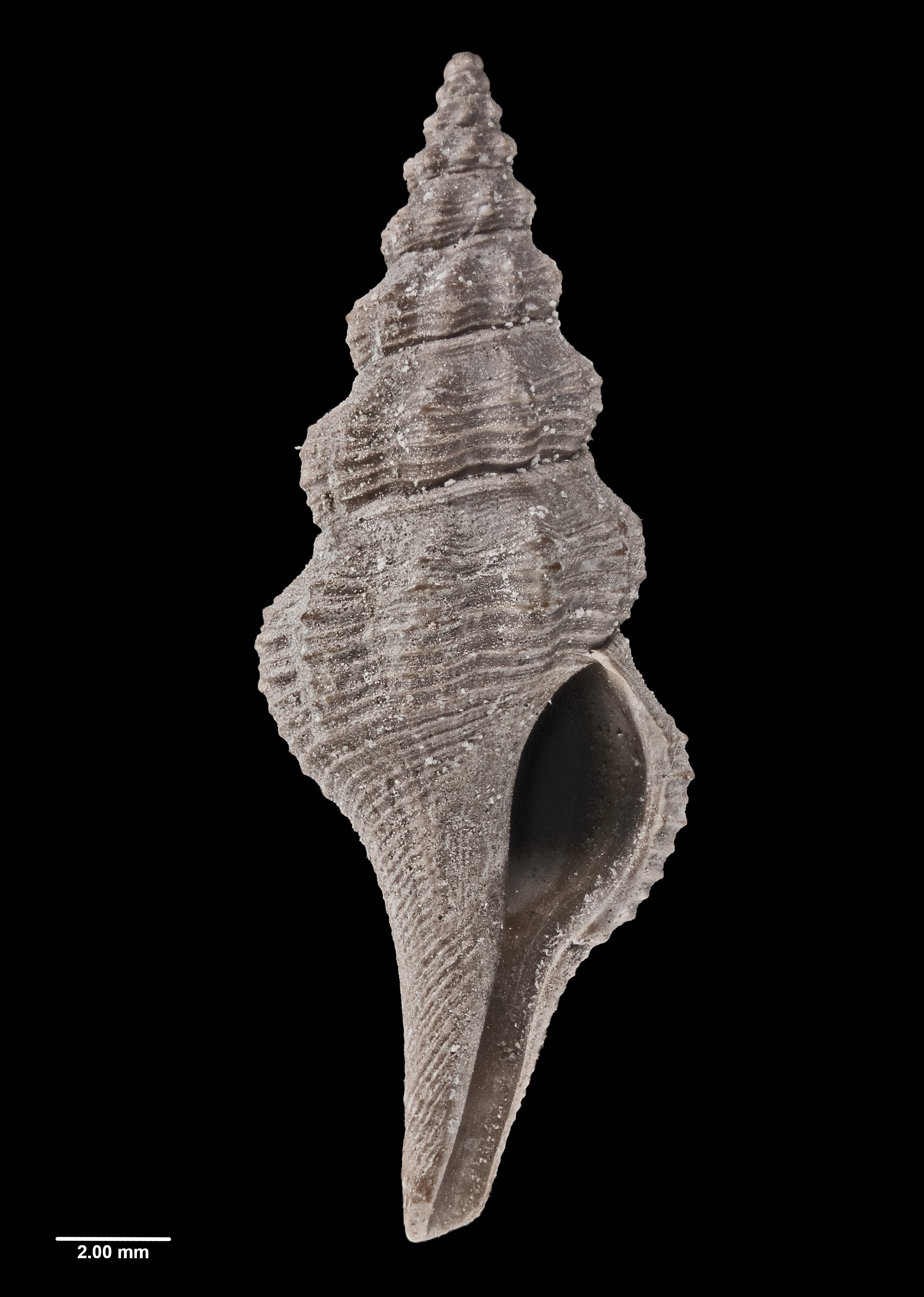
- Holotype from Auckland War Memorial Museum

Scientific classification
- Kingdom: Animalia
- Phylum: Mollusca
- Class: Gastropoda
- Subclass: Caenogastropoda
- Order: Neogastropoda
- Family: Pseudomelatomidae
- Genus: Comitas
- Species: †C. torquayensis

Binomial name
- †Comitas torquayensis Powell, 1944

= Comitas torquayensis =

Comitas torquayensis Temporal range: late Oligocene

Extinct species of gastropod

Comitas torquayensis is an extinct species of sea snail, a marine gastropod mollusc in the family Pseudomelatomidae. Fossils of the species date to the late Oligocene, and occurs in the strata of the Port Phillip Basin of Victoria, Australia.

== Description ==
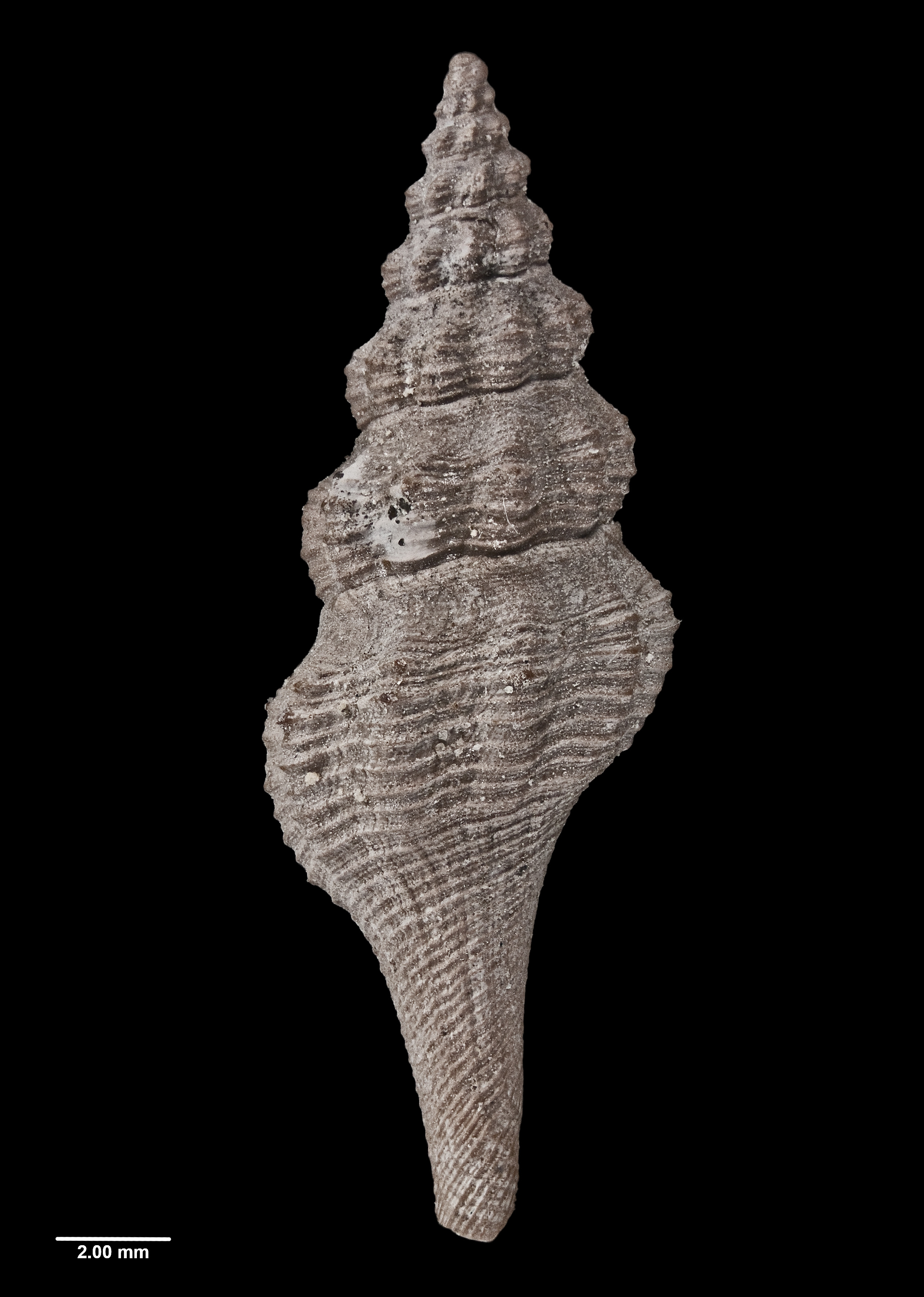
Reverse view of holotype

In the original description, Powell described the species as follows:

Species very similar in general facies to wynyardensis, but with heavier axials and more numerous primary spirals. Axials bluntly rounded, 10 per whorl, extending half way across shoulder, but rapidly fading out on base. Primary spiral cords 4-5 on spire whorls, with a further 3 on body-whorl, at top of aperture. Shoulder with 10 fine spiral threads, two of which are on a narrow subsutural fold. Below the lowest primary spiral on the body-whorl the sculpture is abruptly reduced in strength and consists of about 34 fine linear-spaced threads. The primary spirals are slightly thickened where they cross the axials.

The holotype of the species measures 21 mm (0.83 in) in height and 7.8 mm (0.31 in) in diameter. It can be distinguished from other Australian fossil Comitas species due to the number of axial ribs, protoconch details and relative size.

== Taxonomy ==
The species was first described by A.W.B. Powell in 1944. The holotype was collected from Torquay, Victoria, at an unknown date prior to 1944, and is held by the Auckland War Memorial Museum.

== Distribution ==
This extinct marine species dates to the late Oligocene, and occurs in the strata of the Port Phillip Basin of Victoria, Australia, from the Jan Juc Formation.
