= Comitas kenneti =

Scientific classification
- Kingdom: Animalia
- Phylum: Mollusca
- Class: Gastropoda
- Subclass: Caenogastropoda
- Order: Neogastropoda
- Superfamily: Conoidea
- Family: Pseudomelatomidae
- Genus: Comitas
- Species: C. kenneti

Binomial name
- Comitas kenneti Beu, 1970

Extinct species of gastropod

Comitas kenneti is an extinct species of sea snail, a marine gastropod mollusc in the family Pseudomelatomidae.

== Distribution ==
This marine species is endemic to New Zealand and fossils were found in Upper Miocene strata of the Wairarapa District.
