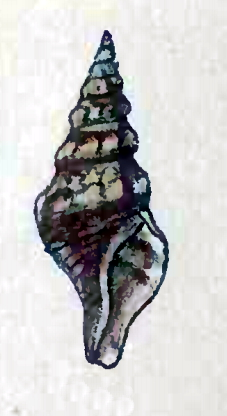
- Drawing of a shell of Comitas albicincta

Scientific classification
- Kingdom: Animalia
- Phylum: Mollusca
- Class: Gastropoda
- Subclass: Caenogastropoda
- Order: Neogastropoda
- Superfamily: Conoidea
- Family: Pseudomelatomidae
- Genus: Comitas
- Species: C. albicincta

Binomial name
- Comitas albicincta A. Adams & Reeve, 1850

Synonyms
- Drillia albicincta (Adams & Reeve, 1850); Pleurotoma albicincta Adams & Reeve, 1850 (original combination)

= Comitas albicincta =

Species of gastropod

Comitas albicincta is a species of sea snail, a marine gastropod mollusc in the family Pseudomelatomidae, the turrids and allies.

== Description ==
G.W. Tryon was of the opinion that this was a more highly colored adult of Drillia putillus (synonym of Clavus putillus (Reeve, 1845)) with the peripheral row of tubercles whitish. He could not find other differences.

The fusiform shell consists of ten whorls. These are transversally crossed by delicate striae. The fulvescent shell shows a white zone that passes over the nodules upon the angle in the center of each whorl. The sinus is small.

== Distribution ==
This marine species occurs in the East China Sea and in the South China Sea
