= Comitas laura =

Scientific classification
- Kingdom: Animalia
- Phylum: Mollusca
- Class: Gastropoda
- Subclass: Caenogastropoda
- Order: Neogastropoda
- Superfamily: Conoidea
- Family: Pseudomelatomidae
- Genus: Comitas
- Species: C. laura

Binomial name
- Comitas laura (Thiele, 1925)

Synonyms
- Surcula laura Thiele, 1925 (original combination)

Species of gastropod

Comitas laura is a species of sea snail, a marine gastropod mollusc in the family Pseudomelatomidae, the turrids and allies.

== Distribution ==
This marine species occurs off Kenya.
