= Comitas ensyuensis =

Scientific classification
- Kingdom: Animalia
- Phylum: Mollusca
- Class: Gastropoda
- Subclass: Caenogastropoda
- Order: Neogastropoda
- Superfamily: Conoidea
- Family: Pseudomelatomidae
- Genus: Comitas
- Species: C. ensyuensis

Binomial name
- Comitas ensyuensis Shikama & Hayashi in Shikama, 1977

Synonyms
- Turricula (Comitas) ensyuensis Shikama, 1977 (basionym); Turricula ensyuensis Shikama, 1977(original combination)

Species of gastropod

Comitas ensyuensis is a species of sea snails, a marine gastropod mollusc in the family Pseudomelatomidae, the turrids and allies.

== Description ==
The length of the shell varies between 70 mm and 95 mm.

The shell is small to medium-sized, thin, fusiform, and turriform, with a high spire comprising eight teleoconch whorls. The protoconch is small, white, lustrous, and consists of two whorls. The teleoconch is light yellowish-brown and sculptured with numerous spiral striations. The suture is relatively deep, and the shoulder is angular with a white spiral band. The posterior sinus is shallow, broad, and V-shaped, while the selenizone is broad, depressed, and situated close to the suture. The axial ribs are nodulose at the shoulder. The columella is narrow, white, lustrous, and twisted. The aperture is narrow and lanceolate, and the siphonal canal is long, projecting anteriorly.

== Taxonomy ==
Comitas ensyuensis was first described by Tokio Shikama in 1977 as Turricula (Comitas) ensyuensis. It was subsequently treated as Turricula ensyuensis in later classifications. Following taxonomic revision, the species is now placed in the genus Comitas, with Comitas ensyuensis recognized as the accepted name. Both Turricula (Comitas) ensyuensis and Turricula ensyuensis are considered superseded combinations.

== Distribution ==
This marine species occurs off Japan and the Philippines.
