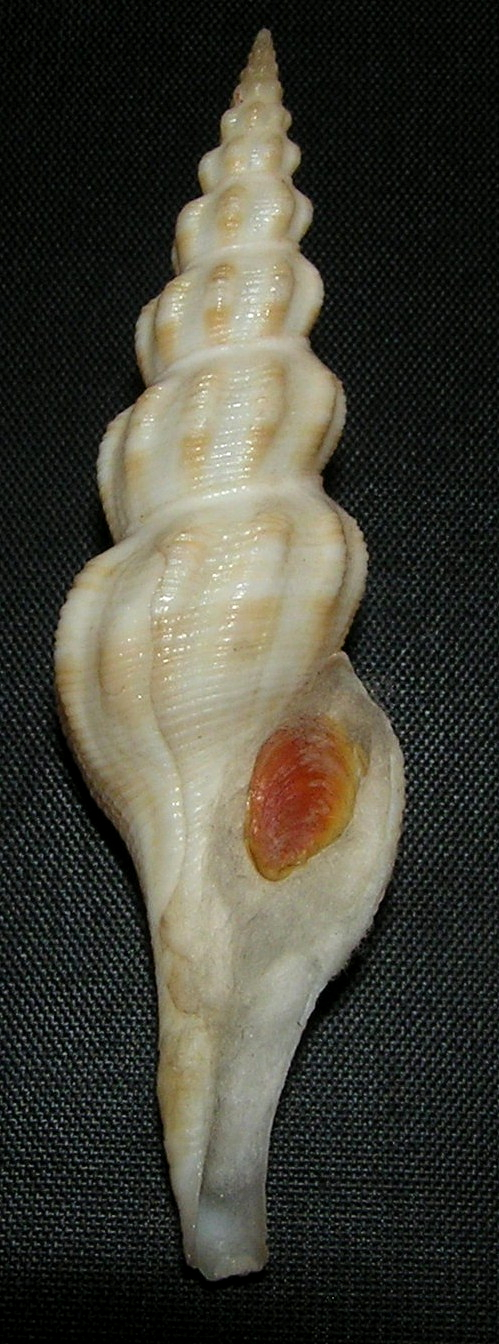
- Apertural view of a shell of Comitas ilariae

Scientific classification
- Kingdom: Animalia
- Phylum: Mollusca
- Class: Gastropoda
- Subclass: Caenogastropoda
- Order: Neogastropoda
- Superfamily: Conoidea
- Family: Pseudomelatomidae
- Genus: Comitas
- Species: C. ilariae

Binomial name
- Comitas ilariae Bozzetti, 1991

= Comitas ilariae =

Species of gastropod

Comitas ilariae is a species of sea snail, a marine gastropod mollusk in the family Pseudomelatomidae, commonly known as turrids and allies. It was first described in 1991 from specimens found off the Philippines. This species belongs to the genus Comitas.

== Description ==
The shell of Comitas ilariae reaches a length of 70 to 85 mm.

== Distribution ==
This marine species is known from waters off the Philippines.

== Ecology ==
Comitas ilariae was first described by Luigi Bozzetti in 1991, based on specimens collected from the Philippines. The species is accepted in the World Register of Marine Species (WoRMS).
