= Comitas galatheae =

Scientific classification
- Kingdom: Animalia
- Phylum: Mollusca
- Class: Gastropoda
- Subclass: Caenogastropoda
- Order: Neogastropoda
- Superfamily: Conoidea
- Family: Pseudomelatomidae
- Genus: Comitas
- Species: C. galatheae

Binomial name
- Comitas galatheae Powell, 1969

Species of gastropod

Comitas galatheae, common name the galatheae turrid, is a species of sea snail, a marine gastropod mollusc in the family Pseudomelatomidae, the turrids and allies.

== Description ==
The length of the shell attains 105 mm.

== Distribution ==
This marine species occurs off the Aru Islands, Eastern Indonesia, and Western Australia.
