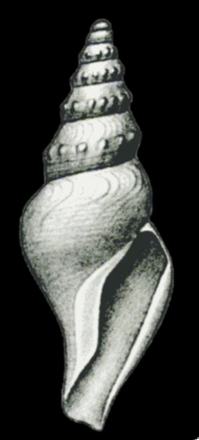
- Shell of Leucosyrinx aequatorialis (holotype)

Scientific classification
- Kingdom: Animalia
- Phylum: Mollusca
- Class: Gastropoda
- Subclass: Caenogastropoda
- Order: Neogastropoda
- Superfamily: Conoidea
- Family: Pseudomelatomidae
- Genus: Leucosyrinx
- Species: L. aequatorialis

Binomial name
- Leucosyrinx aequatorialis Thiele, 1925

Synonyms
- Comitas aequatorialis (Thiele, 1925) (basionym)

= Leucosyrinx aequatorialis =

Species of gastropod

Leucosyrinx aequatorialis is a species of sea snail, a marine gastropod mollusc in the family Pseudomelatomidae, the turrids and allies.

== Description ==
The shell length of the immature holotype is 13 mm.

Leucosyrinx aequatorialis is characterized by a shell shape, sculpture pattern, and subsutural anal sinus that fall within the range of variation observed in species of Leucosyrinx. The species lacks nodules on the shoulder of the body whorl, a feature shared with several other members of the genus. The shape of the anal sinus is more consistent with Leucosyrinx than with Comitas, supporting its placement within Leucosyrinx.

== Distribution ==
This marine species occurs in the Indian Ocean off Somalia.
