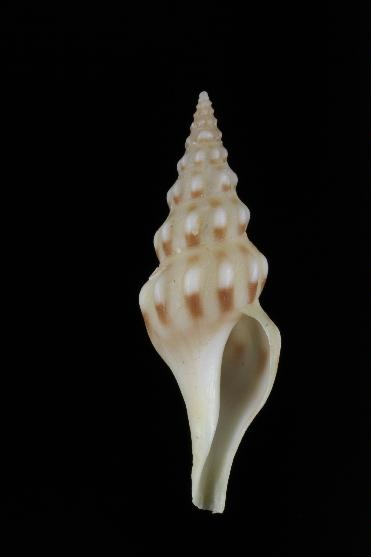
- Shell of Comitas murrawolga (specimen at MNHN, Paris)

Scientific classification
- Kingdom: Animalia
- Phylum: Mollusca
- Class: Gastropoda
- Subclass: Caenogastropoda
- Order: Neogastropoda
- Superfamily: Conoidea
- Family: Pseudomelatomidae
- Genus: Comitas
- Species: C. murrawolga

Binomial name
- Comitas murrawolga (Garrard, 1961)

Synonyms
- Turricula murrawolga Garrard, 1961 (basionym)

= Comitas murrawolga =

Species of gastropod

Comitas murrawolga is a species of sea snail, a marine gastropod mollusc in the family Pseudomelatomidae.

== Description ==
Comitas murrawolga is a predatory turrid gastropod with shell adaptations suited to deeper marine environments. It plays a role in benthic ecosystems by preying on smaller invertebrates, contributing to trophic dynamics. While the species is not currently evaluated for conservation status, potential threats include habitat disruption from trawling activities, pollution, and ocean acidification affecting shell formation. The length of the shell attains 76 mm.

== Distribution ==
This marine species occurs off the Philippines, New Caledonia, and Australia (specifically off New South Wales, Queensland, South Australia, Tasmania, Victoria, Western Australia). In Australia, it is recorded from areas such as Mooloolabah in Queensland to the Great Australian Bight, at depths of 75 to 180 meters. It is a rare species in these habitats.
