= Comitas kaipara =

Scientific classification
- Kingdom: Animalia
- Phylum: Mollusca
- Class: Gastropoda
- Subclass: Caenogastropoda
- Order: Neogastropoda
- Superfamily: Conoidea
- Family: Pseudomelatomidae
- Genus: Comitas
- Species: C. kaipara

Binomial name
- Comitas kaipara C.R. Laws, 1939

Extinct species of gastropod

Comitas kaipara is an extinct species of sea snail, a marine gastropod mollusc in the family Pseudomelatomidae.

== Description ==
The length of the shell attains 19 mm, its diameter is 6.3 mm.

The species was first described by Charles Reed Laws in 1939. It is an extinct species, known only from fossil remains found in New Zealand.

== Distribution ==
This marine species is endemic to New Zealand. Fossils have been in Cenozoic strata.
