= Comitas fusiformis =

Scientific classification
- Kingdom: Animalia
- Phylum: Mollusca
- Class: Gastropoda
- Subclass: Caenogastropoda
- Order: Neogastropoda
- Superfamily: Conoidea
- Family: Pseudomelatomidae
- Genus: Comitas
- Species: C. fusiformis

Binomial name
- Comitas fusiformis (Hutton, 1877)

Synonyms
- † Drillia fusiformis Hutton, 1877 (original combination); † Pleurotoma trailli Hutton, 1873 (homonym, already published in May 1873); † Surcula huttoni Suter, 1914; † Surcula oamarutica Suter, 1917

Extinct species of gastropod

Comitas fusiformis is an extinct species of sea snails, a marine gastropod mollusc in the family Pseudomelatomidae, the turrids and allies

== Distribution ==
This extinct marine species is endemic to New Zealand.
