= Comitas kuroharai =

Scientific classification
- Kingdom: Animalia
- Phylum: Mollusca
- Class: Gastropoda
- Subclass: Caenogastropoda
- Order: Neogastropoda
- Superfamily: Conoidea
- Family: Pseudomelatomidae
- Genus: Comitas
- Species: C. kuroharai

Binomial name
- Comitas kuroharai Oyama, 1962

Synonyms
- Turricula kuroharai Oyama, 1962 (basionym)

Species of gastropod

Comitas kuroharai is a species of sea snail, a marine gastropod mollusc in the family Pseudomelatomidae, the turrids and allies.

== Description ==
The length of the shell attains 82 mm.

== Distribution ==
This marine species occurs in the East China Sea and off Japan.
