= Comitas allani =

Scientific classification
- Kingdom: Animalia
- Phylum: Mollusca
- Class: Gastropoda
- Subclass: Caenogastropoda
- Order: Neogastropoda
- Superfamily: Conoidea
- Family: Pseudomelatomidae
- Genus: Comitas
- Species: †C. allani

Binomial name
- †Comitas allani A.W.B. Powell, 1942

Extinct species of gastropod

Comitas allani is an extinct species of sea snail, a marine gastropod mollusc in the family Pseudomelatomidae.

== Description ==
The length of the shell attains 26.7 mm.

== Distribution ==
This extinct marine species was found in Lower Pleistocene strata off Hawke’s Bay, New Zealand. The type specimen is in the Auckland Museum.

=== "Bortonian" Time Capsule ===
Comitas allani is what paleontologists call an index fossil for the Bortonian stage (Middle Eocene, roughly 40 million years ago). Because it was so specialized to the environment of that specific time, its "extinction" in the fossil record is used by geologists as a biological boundary marker. When you stop finding C. allani in a sediment layer, it's often the primary signal to geologists that they have moved out of the Middle Eocene and into a new epoch.
