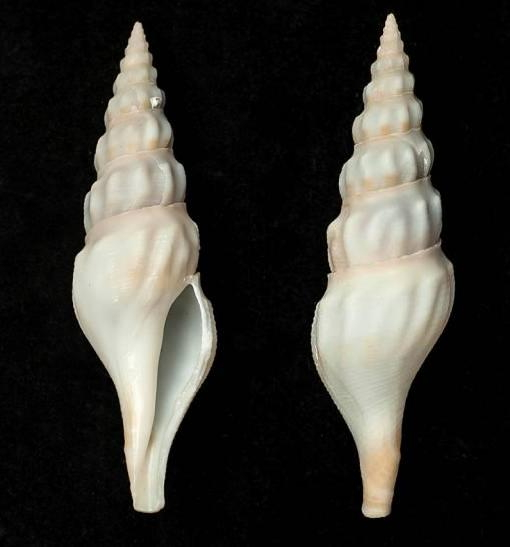
- Apertural view of a shell of Comitas vezo

Scientific classification
- Kingdom: Animalia
- Phylum: Mollusca
- Class: Gastropoda
- Subclass: Caenogastropoda
- Order: Neogastropoda
- Superfamily: Conoidea
- Family: Pseudomelatomidae
- Genus: Comitas
- Species: C. vezo

Binomial name
- Comitas vezo Bozzetti, 2001

= Comitas vezo =

Species of sea snails

Comitas vezo is a species of sea snails, a marine gastropod mollusc in the family Pseudomelatomidae, the turrids and allies.

== Description ==
The length of the shell attains 47 mm.

== Distribution ==
This marine species occurs off Madagascar.
