= Comitas miyazakiensis =

Scientific classification
- Kingdom: Animalia
- Phylum: Mollusca
- Class: Gastropoda
- Subclass: Caenogastropoda
- Order: Neogastropoda
- Superfamily: Conoidea
- Family: Pseudomelatomidae
- Genus: Comitas
- Species: C. miyazakiensis

Binomial name
- Comitas miyazakiensis T. Shuto, 1961

Synonyms
- Comitas (Fusiturricula) miyazakiensis T. Shuto, 1961

Species of gastropod

Comitas miyazakiensis is a species of sea snail, a marine gastropod mollusc in the family Pseudomelatomidae, the turrids and allies.

Holotype in Kyushu University Research Museum.

== Distribution ==
This marine species occurs off Japan
