= Comitas abnormis =

Scientific classification
- Kingdom: Animalia
- Phylum: Mollusca
- Class: Gastropoda
- Subclass: Caenogastropoda
- Order: Neogastropoda
- Superfamily: Conoidea
- Family: Pseudomelatomidae
- Genus: Comitas
- Species: C. abnormis

Binomial name
- Comitas abnormis L.C. King, 1933

Extinct species of gastropod

Comitas abnormis is an extinct species of sea snail, a marine gastropod mollusc in the family Pseudomelatomidae, the turrids and allies.

== Distribution ==
This marine species is endemic to New Zealand. Fossils have been found in Tertiary strata of southern Wairarapa.
