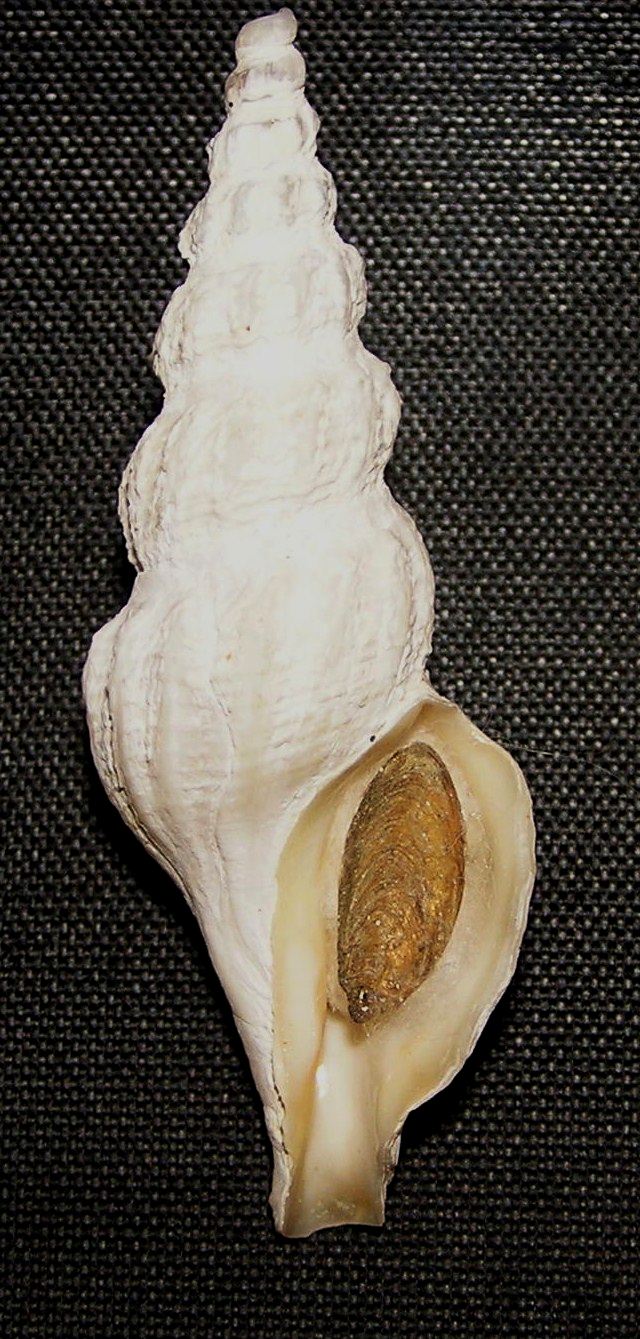
- Apertural view of a shell of Comitas saldanhae

Scientific classification
- Kingdom: Animalia
- Phylum: Mollusca
- Class: Gastropoda
- Subclass: Caenogastropoda
- Order: Neogastropoda
- Superfamily: Conoidea
- Family: Pseudomelatomidae
- Genus: Comitas
- Species: C. saldanhae

Binomial name
- Comitas saldanhae (Barnard, 1958)

Synonyms
- not Comitas saldanhae Powell 1966; Turris saldanhae Barnard, 1958 (original combination)

= Comitas saldanhae =

Species of gastropod

Comitas saldanhae, common name the Benguela comitas, is a species of sea snail, a marine gastropod mollusc in the family Pseudomelatomidae, the turrids and allies.

== Description ==
The length of the shell varies between 40 mm and 62 mm, but is usually less than 45 mm.

The shell is spindle-shaped, featuring a short siphonal canal and an elevated spire. Whorls are distinctly shouldered, with an indented suture. The shoulder slope is adorned with spiral threads, while below the shoulder, the sculpture includes oblique axial ribs crossed by finer spiral threads. The base displays only spiral threads and growth lines. The outer lip has a broad, moderately deep U-shaped anal sinus at the shoulder, and in larger specimens, the lip edge flares outward below this point.

The shell is chalky white with a dull brown periostracum. The apex, ribs, and subsutural region are frequently eroded, and the shell is often covered in mud.

== Remarks ==
The shell of the species possesses an anal sinus, which occupies part of the subsutural ramp, similar to species of Comitas. Nervertheless, the radula consists of duplex marginal teeth, with the accessory limb of the marginal tooth inserted into a rather deep and broad socket on the major limb. This tooth structure is very different from the radulae of Comitas that have been examined. Although the exact generic position of the species cannot be determined, the radula type suggests it belongs to the family Pseudomelatomidae.

== Distribution ==
This marine species occurs off the west coast off South Africa (Namibia to west of Cape Point) and off the Orange River.
