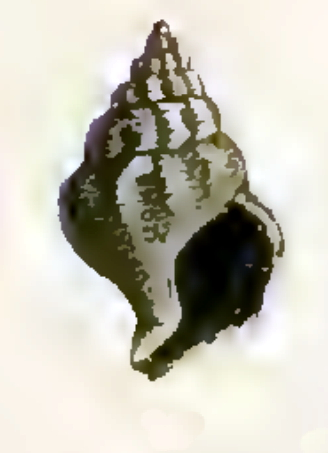
- Original image of a shell of Comitas crenularoides

Scientific classification
- Kingdom: Animalia
- Phylum: Mollusca
- Class: Gastropoda
- Subclass: Caenogastropoda
- Order: Neogastropoda
- Superfamily: Conoidea
- Family: Pseudomelatomidae
- Genus: Comitas
- Species: C. crenularoides

Binomial name
- Comitas crenularoides (G.B. Pritchard, 1896)

Synonyms
- Drillia crenularoides G.B. Pritchard, 1896

= Comitas crenularoides =

Extinct species of gastropod

Comitas crenularoides is an extinct species of sea snail, a marine gastropod mollusc in the family Pseudomelatomidae, the turrids and allies.

== Description ==
The length of the shell attains 24 mm (without embryonic whorls), its diameter 8 mm.

(Original description) The shell is moderately large and narrow-elongate. The spire is many-whorled and longer than the aperture and the siphonal canal. The whorls are nodulosely costate, with a rather well marked subsutural concavity. The sinus in this region is well-defined, moderately broad and deep. The siphonal canal is rather short and straight. The apical angle is about twenty-five degrees. The embryonic whorls of the holotype are unfortunately missing. The spire consists of about eight convex whorls with the greatest convexity about the middle of each whorl. The posterior third of each whorl is rather deeply concave immediately under the suture, which gives the appearance to this part of the shell of rather a strong overlap of the whorls, anterior two-thirds convex, most marked at the ribs. The aperture is oval, somewhat contracted posteriorly, and gradually drawn out anteriorly into a short, slightly curved and open siphonal canal, which is about the same length as the aperture. The outer lip is thin and slightly crenulated at the outer edge with a very distinct, broad and deep sinus just below the rather prominent subsutural band and situated in the concave posterior third. The sinus is about half as deep again as broad, thence the outer lip projects prominently forward, then gently arched to join the anterior canal. The columella is simple, slightly bent and tapering. The posterior whorls are ornamented with slightly oblique ribs, developed in the anterior two-thirds of the whorls and extending right up, though gradually fading, to the anterior suture, thus leaving the posterior third practically free from costulate elevations. On the anterior whorls the ribs fade sooner towards the anterior suture, though strongly elevated and prominent medially, giving rise to the appearance rather of a medial band of nodules or tubercles than to fully developed ribs. The ribs or tubercles number about nine to a whorl. Spiral ornament consists of four or five strong spiral threads in the anterior two thirds of each whorl, while the body whorl shows about eight or nine, and one strong thread just adjacent to the posterior suture, making rather a prominent and characteristic subsutural band. On the posterior whorls the anterior group of threads are comparatively broad, with narrower grooves between, but anteriorly the grooves widen out till on the penultimate whorl the grooves or interspaces are broader than the threads, and become still more distinctly so on the body whorl. As the grooves widen out much finer spiral threads become visible in this space, the interspaces on the body whorl showing three of these finer intercalated threads. In the concave space between the subsutural band and the threads of the anterior portion of the whorl, which is occupied by the growth lines of the sinus, there are two or three fine spiral threads, with still finer threads, just visible under a lens, on either side of them. The ribs and spiral ornament are both traversed by fine and close lines of growth, which by their marked sinuation and forward curvature clearly indicate the nature and position of the shell.

== Distribution ==
This marine species is endemic to Australia. Fossils have been found in Eocene strata of Table Cape, Tasmania
