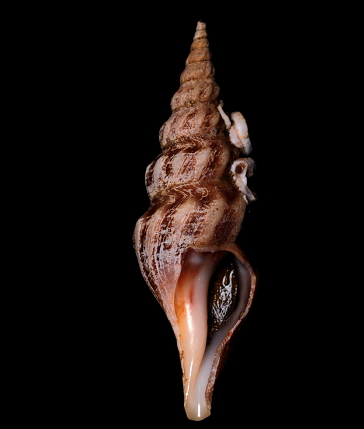
- Shell of Comitas stolida

Scientific classification
- Kingdom: Animalia
- Phylum: Mollusca
- Class: Gastropoda
- Subclass: Caenogastropoda
- Order: Neogastropoda
- Superfamily: Conoidea
- Family: Pseudomelatomidae
- Genus: Comitas
- Species: C. stolida

Binomial name
- Comitas stolida (Hinds, 1843)

Synonyms
- Pleurotoma stolidaHinds, 1843; Turris stolida (Hinds, 1843)

= Comitas stolida =

Species of gastropod

Comitas stolida, common name the Agulhas comitas, is a species of sea snail, a marine gastropod mollusc in the family Pseudomelatomidae, the turrids and allies.

== Description ==
The length of the shell attains 55 mm. The shell is spindle-shaped with an elevated spire. Whorls are angled at the periphery, featuring distinct, obliquely elongated nodules that resemble ribs. Otherwise, the shell is sculpted only by growth lines and fine, closely spaced spiral threads. The outer lip has a moderately deep, U-shaped anal sinus just below the suture, with a convex edge below this point.

The shell is brown to reddish-brown, the peripheral nodules are whitish.

== Distribution ==
This marine species is endemic to South Africa and occurs off the south coast and the Agulhas Bank, at depths between 60 m and 150 m.
