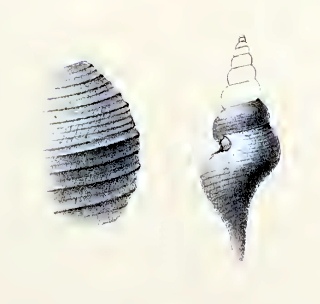
- Original image of a shell of Comitas rotundata

Scientific classification
- Kingdom: Animalia
- Phylum: Mollusca
- Class: Gastropoda
- Subclass: Caenogastropoda
- Order: Neogastropoda
- Superfamily: Conoidea
- Family: Pseudomelatomidae
- Genus: Comitas
- Species: C. rotundata

Binomial name
- Comitas rotundata (Watson, 1881)

Synonyms
- Pleurotoma (Surcula) rotundata R.B. Watson, 1881 (original combination)

= Comitas rotundata =

Species of gastropod

Comitas rotundata is a species of sea snail, a marine gastropod mollusc in the family Pseudomelatomidae.

== Description ==
(Original description) The shell is high, narrow, fusiform and conical. It has rounded whorls and a shallow suture, below which the inferior whorl swells out tumidly. The body whorl is short and rounded, with a constricted conical base and a long narrow aperture.

Sculpture: Longitudinals— there are strongish, close-set, rounded, hair-like lines of growth, specially strong below the suture. Spirals – over the whole surface are strong, but unequal, rather distant, sharpish threads. Those in the sutural area are, with two or three exceptions, weaker than those elsewhere. About three at the periphery are somewhat prominent.

The colour of the shell is porcelain-white under a thin yellow epidermis. The suture is fine, superficial, but well defined. The aperture is club-shaped, being oval, with a long narrow siphonal canal below and a blunt angulation above. The outer lip is very evenly curved, but a little more steeply above than below.;It is drawn out into a long straight line along the side of the siphonal canal. The edge-line, on leaving the body, retreats very straight toward the left to the rather remote, wide, and openly rounded, but very deep sinus, between which and the body whorl lies an acute triangular shelf, while below is the very high shouldered and prominent lip. The inner lip is exceptionally narrow, but strong and marginated. It is very little concave at the junction of the body and the columella, which is long, narrow, and is cut off at the point with a long, little oblique, sharp, and scarcely twisted edge.

== Distribution ==
This species occurs in the Mid-Pacific Ocean, east of Japan.
