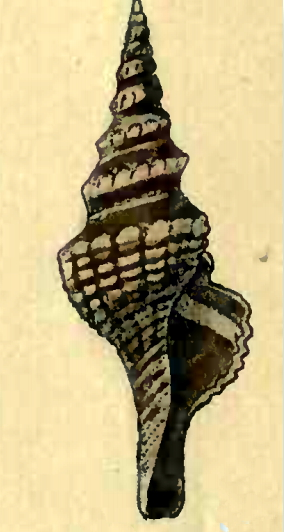
- Drawing of a shell of Comitas lurida

Scientific classification
- Kingdom: Animalia
- Phylum: Mollusca
- Class: Gastropoda
- Subclass: Caenogastropoda
- Order: Neogastropoda
- Superfamily: Conoidea
- Family: Pseudomelatomidae
- Genus: Comitas
- Species: C. lurida

Binomial name
- Comitas lurida (A. Adams & Reeve, 1850)

Synonyms
- Pleurotoma lurida Adams & Reeve, 1850 (original combination)

= Comitas lurida =

Species of gastropod

Comitas lurida is a species of sea snail, a marine gastropod mollusc in the family Pseudomelatomidae, the turrids and allies.

== Description ==
The fusiform shell consists of ten whorls. The angular whorls are crossed by delicate, spiral striae and longitudinal obtuse ribs. The whorls are tuberculated in the middle, the tubercles developing from more or less indistinct oblique folds or ribs, everywhere closely encircled by striae. The dark fulvescent shell shows a banded white zone that passes over the nodules upon the angle in the center of each whorl. The sinus is rather large.

== Distribution ==
This marine species occurs in the East China Sea and in the South China Sea
