= Comitas silicicola =

Scientific classification
- Kingdom: Animalia
- Phylum: Mollusca
- Class: Gastropoda
- Subclass: Caenogastropoda
- Order: Neogastropoda
- Superfamily: Conoidea
- Family: Pseudomelatomidae
- Genus: Comitas
- Species: C. silicicola

Binomial name
- Comitas silicicola Darragh, 2017

Extinct species of gastropod

Comitas silicicola is an extinct species of sea snail, a marine gastropod mollusc in the family Pseudomelatomidae.

== Distribution ==
This extinct marine species was found in late Eocene strata in the Pallinup Formation, Eucla Basin, Western Australia, Australia
