= Comitas williamsi =

Scientific classification
- Kingdom: Animalia
- Phylum: Mollusca
- Class: Gastropoda
- Subclass: Caenogastropoda
- Order: Neogastropoda
- Superfamily: Conoidea
- Family: Pseudomelatomidae
- Genus: Comitas
- Species: C. williamsi

Binomial name
- Comitas williamsi Marwick, 1965

Extinct species of gastropod

Comitas williamsi is an extinct species of sea snail, a marine gastropod mollusc in the family Pseudomelatomidae, the turrids and allies.

== Distribution ==
This marine species is endemic to New Zealand. Fossils have been found in Upper Cenozoic strata of the Wairoa District.
