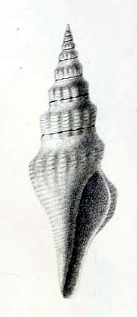
- Original image of a shell of Comitas recticosta

Scientific classification
- Kingdom: Animalia
- Phylum: Mollusca
- Class: Gastropoda
- Subclass: Caenogastropoda
- Order: Neogastropoda
- Superfamily: Conoidea
- Family: Pseudomelatomidae
- Genus: Comitas
- Species: C. recticosta

Binomial name
- Comitas recticosta (Bellardi, 1847)

Synonyms
- † Pleurotoma recticostata Bellardi, 1847

= Comitas recticosta =

Extinct species of gastropod

Comitas recticosta is an extinct species of sea snail, a marine gastropod mollusc in the family Pseudomelatomidae.

== Distribution ==
Fossils of this species were found in Piedmont, Italy.
