= Comitas trailli =

Scientific classification
- Kingdom: Animalia
- Phylum: Mollusca
- Class: Gastropoda
- Subclass: Caenogastropoda
- Order: Neogastropoda
- Superfamily: Conoidea
- Family: Pseudomelatomidae
- Genus: Comitas
- Species: C. trailli

Binomial name
- Comitas trailli (Hutton, 1873)

Synonyms
- Comitas aemula Angas, 1877; Comitas verrucosa Suter, 1899; Pleurotoma trailli Hutton, 1873 (original combination)

Species of gastropod

Comitas trailli is a species of sea snails, a marine gastropod mollusc in the family Pseudomelatomidae, the turrids and allies.

== Description ==
The length of the shell attains 28 mm, its diameter 10 mm.

The fusiform shell has an acute spire. The whorls are slightly carinated with fine spiral lines and transverse ribs anteriorly. The posterior part is smooth. The aperture is ovate. The siphonal canal is rather produced. The body whorl is shorter than the spire.

== Distribution ==
This marine species is endemic to New Zealand and occurs off South Island where fossils have been found in Tertiary strata.
