= Comitas hayashii =

Scientific classification
- Kingdom: Animalia
- Phylum: Mollusca
- Class: Gastropoda
- Subclass: Caenogastropoda
- Order: Neogastropoda
- Superfamily: Conoidea
- Family: Pseudomelatomidae
- Genus: Comitas
- Species: C. hayashii

Binomial name
- Comitas hayashii (Shikama, 1977)

Synonyms
- Rectiplanes (Rectisulcus) hayashii Shikama, 1977 (basionym); Rectiplanes hayashii Shikama, 1977 (original combination)

Species of gastropod

Comitas hayashii is a species of sea snails, a marine gastropod mollusc in the family Pseudomelatomidae, the turrids and allies

== Distribution ==
This marine species occurs off Japan.
