= Comitas parvifusiformis =

Scientific classification
- Kingdom: Animalia
- Phylum: Mollusca
- Class: Gastropoda
- Subclass: Caenogastropoda
- Order: Neogastropoda
- Superfamily: Conoidea
- Family: Pseudomelatomidae
- Genus: Comitas
- Species: C. parvifusiformis

Binomial name
- Comitas parvifusiformis Li & Li, 2008

Species of gastropod

Comitas parvifusiformis is a species of sea snail, a marine gastropod mollusc in the family Pseudomelatomidae.

== Distribution ==
This species occurs in the China sea.
