= Comitas onokeana =

Scientific classification
- Kingdom: Animalia
- Phylum: Mollusca
- Class: Gastropoda
- Subclass: Caenogastropoda
- Order: Neogastropoda
- Superfamily: Conoidea
- Family: Pseudomelatomidae
- Genus: Comitas
- Species: C. onokeana

Binomial name
- Comitas onokeana King, 1933

Synonyms
- † Comitas onokeana onokeana L. C. King, 1933· accepted, alternate representation

Species of gastropod

Comitas onokeana is a species of sea snail, a marine gastropod mollusc in the family Pseudomelatomidae, the turrids and allies. Comitas onokeana has a subspecies called Comitas onokeana vivens.Dell, 1956

== Description ==
The length of the shell attains 30 mm, its diameter is 12 mm.

== Distribution ==
This marine species is endemic to New Zealand. Fossils have been found in Tertiary strata of southern Wairarapa.
