= Comitas nana =

Scientific classification
- Kingdom: Animalia
- Phylum: Mollusca
- Class: Gastropoda
- Subclass: Caenogastropoda
- Order: Neogastropoda
- Superfamily: Conoidea
- Family: Pseudomelatomidae
- Genus: Comitas
- Species: C. nana

Binomial name
- Comitas nana Maxwell, 1988

Extinct species of gastropod

Comitas nana is an extinct species of sea snail, a marine gastropod mollusc in the family Pseudomelatomidae.

== Distribution ==
This extinct species is endemic to New Zealand.
