= Comitas onokeana vivens =

Scientific classification
- Kingdom: Animalia
- Phylum: Mollusca
- Class: Gastropoda
- Subclass: Caenogastropoda
- Order: Neogastropoda
- Superfamily: Conoidea
- Family: Pseudomelatomidae
- Genus: Comitas
- Species: C. o. vivens

Binomial name
- Comitas onokeana vivens Dell, 1956

Species of gastropod

Comitas onokeana vivens is a subspecies of sea snail, a marine gastropod mollusc in the family Pseudomelatomidae, the turrids and allies.

== Description ==
The length of the shell attains 48 mm, its diameter is 16 mm.

== Distribution ==
This marine subspecies is endemic to New Zealand and occurs off North Island.
