= Comitas sobrina =

Scientific classification
- Kingdom: Animalia
- Phylum: Mollusca
- Class: Gastropoda
- Subclass: Caenogastropoda
- Order: Neogastropoda
- Superfamily: Conoidea
- Family: Pseudomelatomidae
- Genus: Comitas
- Species: C. sobrina

Binomial name
- Comitas sobrina (M. Yokoyama, 1923)

Extinct species of gastropod

Comitas sobrina is an extinct species of sea snail, a marine gastropod mollusc in the family Pseudomelatomidae.

== Distribution ==
Fossils of this species were found in Cenozoic strata in Japan.
