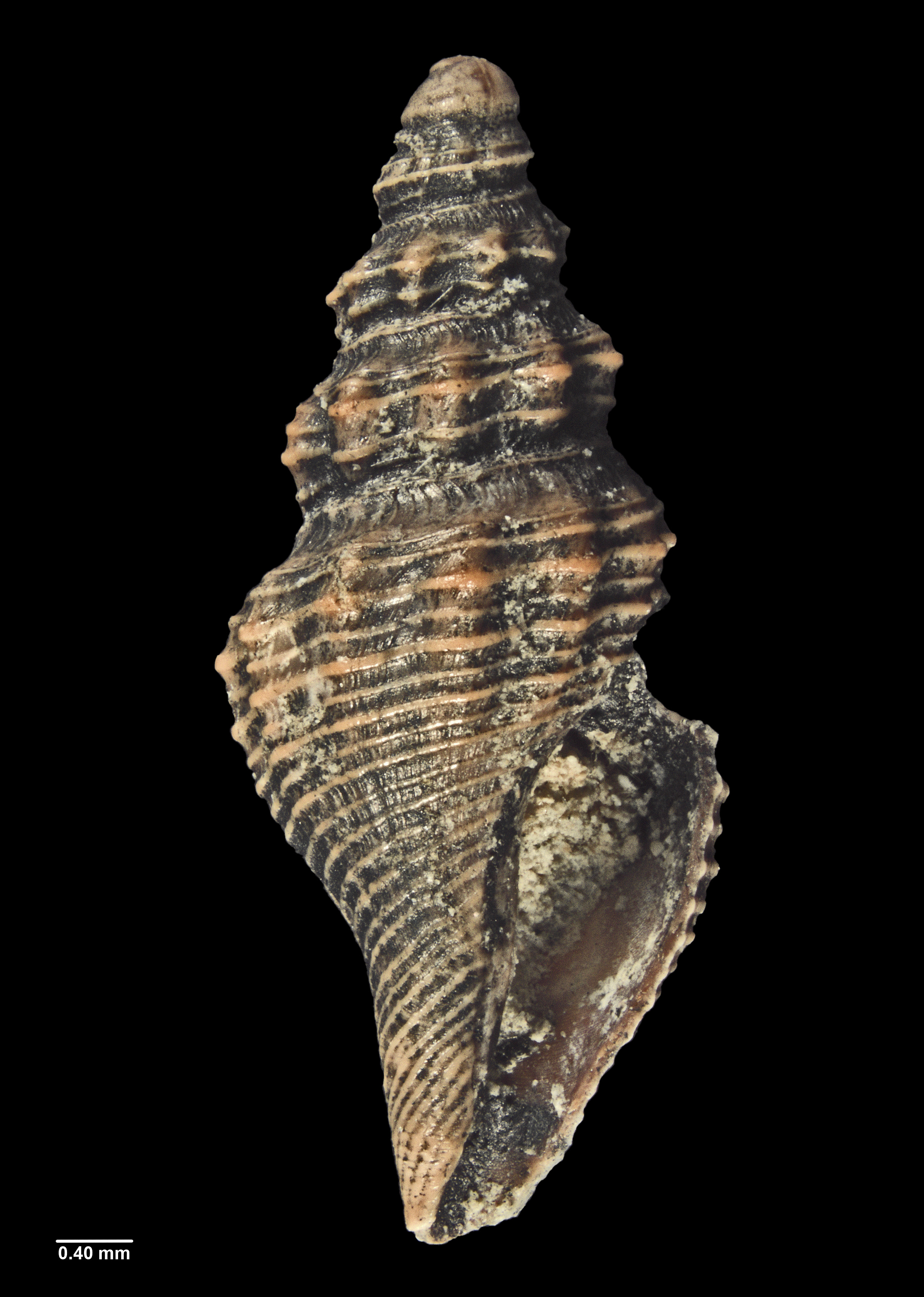
- Holotype from Auckland War Memorial Museum

Scientific classification
- Kingdom: Animalia
- Phylum: Mollusca
- Class: Gastropoda
- Subclass: Caenogastropoda
- Order: Neogastropoda
- Family: Pseudomelatomidae
- Genus: Comitas
- Species: †C. aldingensis

Binomial name
- †Comitas aldingensis Powell, 1944

Synonyms
- † Comitas (Carinacomitas) aldingensis A. W. B. Powell, 1944

= Comitas aldingensis =

Comitas aldingensis Temporal range: late Eocene

Extinct species of gastropod

Comitas aldingensis is an extinct species of sea snail, a marine gastropod mollusc in the family Pseudomelatomidae. Fossils of the species date to the late Eocene, and occurs in the strata of the southern coast of Australia, including the Eucla Basin, St Vincent Basin and the Otway Basin.

== Description ==
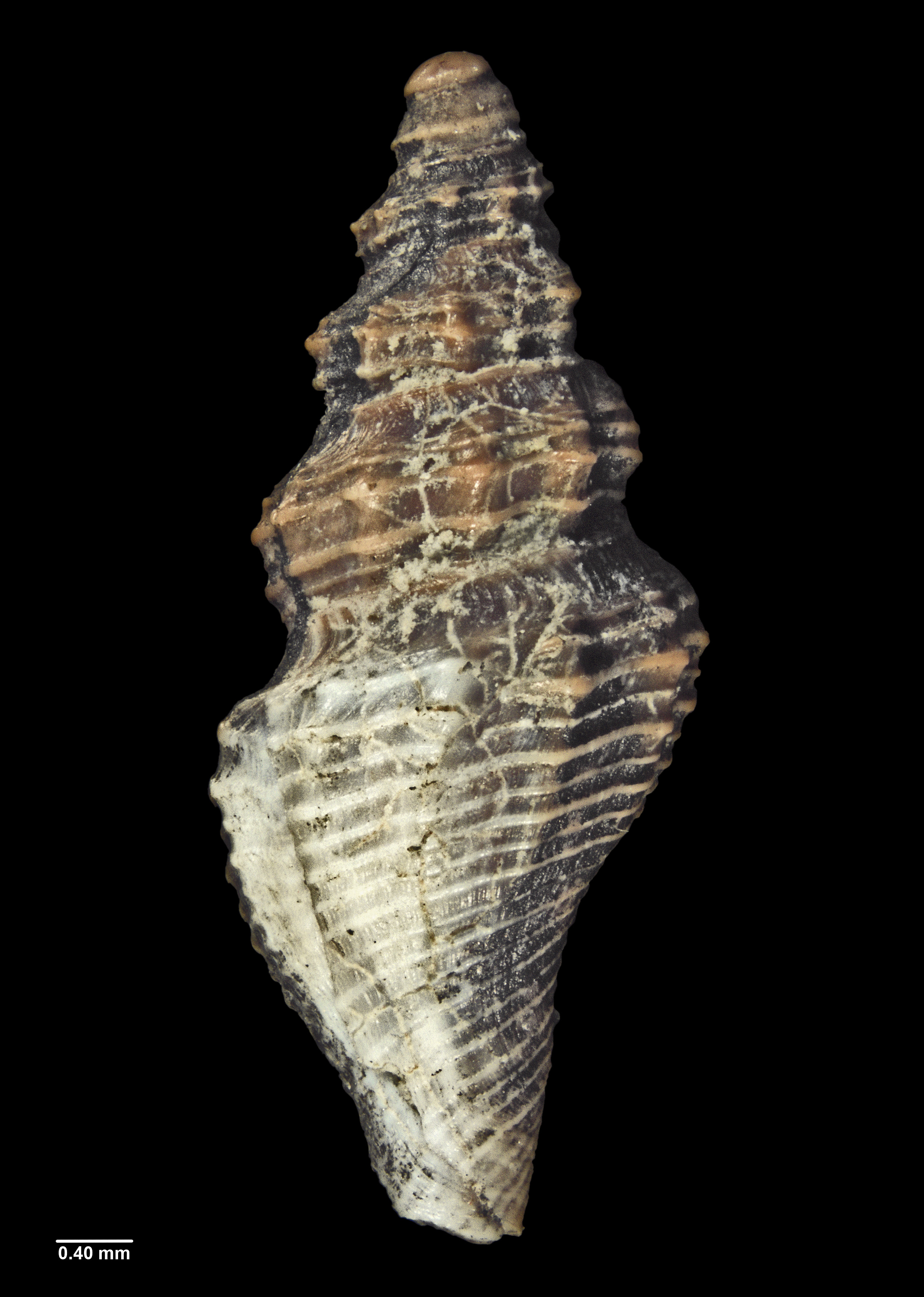
Reverse view of holotype

In the original description, Powell described the species as follows:

Shell much smaller and more heavily sculptured than clarae. The protoconch is broadly rounded, rather erect, of two smooth whorls, which are strongly carinated throughout. The species approaches the New Zealand Recent Anticomitas vivens Powell 1942, but in that genus the whole protoconch is very depressed and flattened on top. The anterior canal, also is much shorter in the Recent species. Whorls bluntly angled just below the middle, sculptured with prominent broadly rounded axials, rapidly fading out on shoulder and not extending over base, 10 per whorl, First post-nuclear whorl develops a spiral thread above the carina, soon followed by another below the carina. These spirals form the three primary keels of subsequent whorls. On the body-whorl two further strong spirals develop near the top of the aperture. There are about 26 narrow spirals on the body-whorl, these becoming gradually smaller and closer spaced towards the anterior end. The shoulder is smooth except for a fine line submargining the suture. The three main spirals develop vertically compressed tubercles where they cross the axials.

The protoconch has between 1.75-2.5 smooth whorls, and has a median carina which develops on either of the first two whorls, which merges into the teleoconch. The teleoconch is fusiform and fairly thin, the species' spire is turretted and approximately half the height of the shell. The species measures an average height of 8.5 mm (0.33 in) and a diameter of 3.7 mm (0.15 in) in diameter. Specimens found from Thomson Road have very weak carinar on the second whorl of the protoconch, and carinae development can vary depending on the location where fossils were found.

== Taxonomy ==
The species was first described by A.W.B. Powell in 1944, under the name Comitas (Carinacomitas) aldingensis, and has been referred to by its current name from 1969. The holotype was collected from Aldinga Beach, South Australia, at an unknown date prior to 1944, and is held by the Auckland War Memorial Museum.

== Distribution ==
This extinct marine species dates between the late Eocene, and occurs in the strata of the Eucla Basin and St Vincent Basin of South Australia, including the Pallinup Formation and the Blanche Point Formation, and the Otway Basin of South Australia/Victoria in the Browns Creek Formation.
