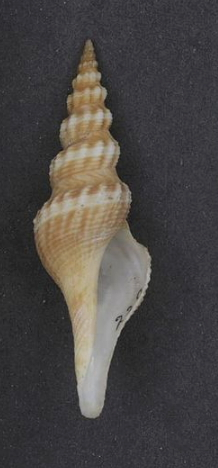
- Apertural view of a shell of Comitas kamakurana (museum specimen at Naturalis Biodiversity Center)

Scientific classification
- Kingdom: Animalia
- Phylum: Mollusca
- Class: Gastropoda
- Subclass: Caenogastropoda
- Order: Neogastropoda
- Superfamily: Conoidea
- Family: Pseudomelatomidae
- Genus: Comitas
- Species: C. kamakurana

Binomial name
- Comitas kamakurana (Pilsbry, 1895)

Synonyms
- Pleurotoma kamakurana Pilsbry, 1895; Turricula kamakurana (Pilsbry, 1895)

= Comitas kamakurana =

Species of gastropod

Comitas kamakurana is a species of sea snail, a marine gastropod mollusk in the family Pseudomelatomidae.

== Description ==
The size of the shell varies between 40 mm and 75 mm.

(Original description) The fusiform shell is much elongated. The siphonal canal is nearly as long as the spire . The color of the shell is dull brown, with an ill-defined light band around the middle. The spire is attenuated. The whorls are very convex, almost angular, concave above and nearly smooth, appressed at the suture. The shell is sculptured with numerous short vertical folds which do not extend on the body whorl below the level of the upper angle of aperture, and become obsolete on its latter half; and numerous subequal, crowded spiral cords throughout. The aperture is nearly half the length of shell, long-elliptical above, passing into a long, open, straight siphonal canal below. The anal sinus is wide and rather shallow. The outer lip is gently arched forward.

== Distribution ==
This species occurs in the Pacific Ocean off the Philippines and Japan.
