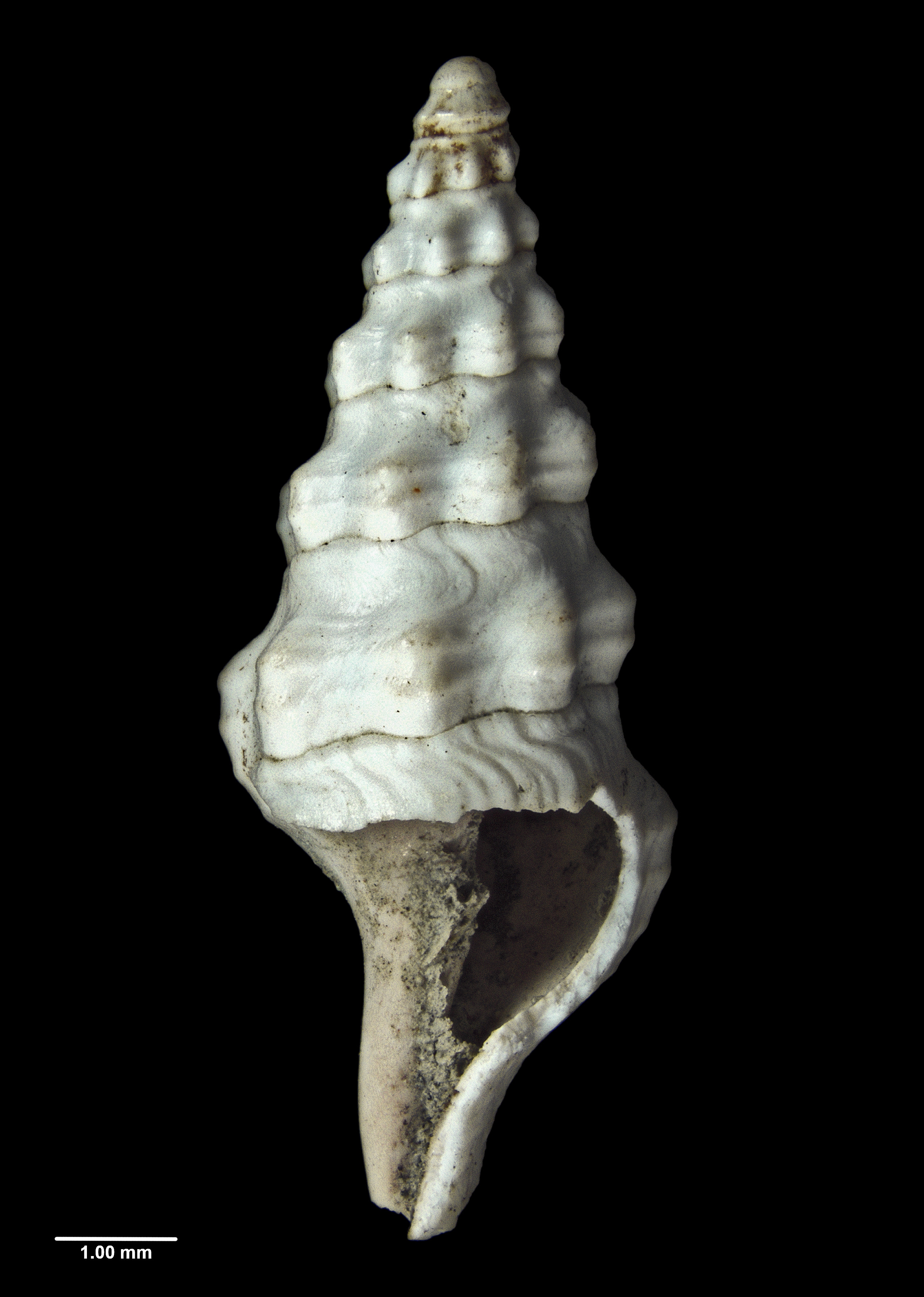

Scientific classification
- Kingdom: Animalia
- Phylum: Mollusca
- Class: Gastropoda
- Subclass: Caenogastropoda
- Order: Neogastropoda
- Superfamily: Conoidea
- Family: Pseudomelatomidae
- Genus: Comitas
- Species: C. subcarinapex

Binomial name
- Comitas subcarinapex A.W.B. Powell, 1942

Synonyms
- Carinacomitas subcarinapex A.W.B. Powell, 1942

= Comitas subcarinapex =

Extinct species of gastropod

Comitas subcarinapex is an extinct species of sea snail, a marine gastropod mollusc in the family Pseudomelatomidae.

== Distribution ==
This extinct marine species was found in Lower Miocene strata off Southland, New Zealand. The type specimen is in the Auckland Museum.
