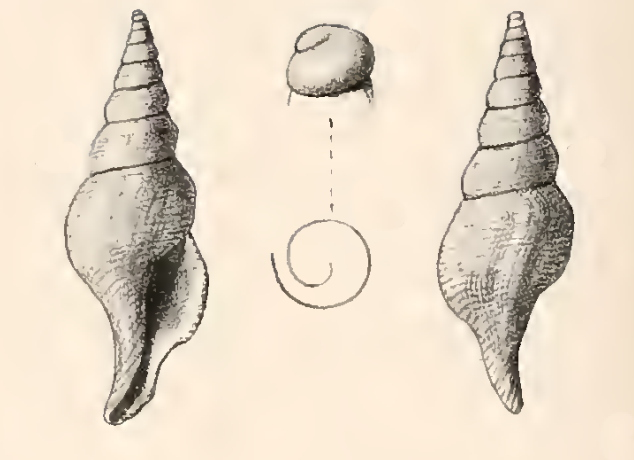
- Shell of Comitas salebrosa (holotype)

Scientific classification
- Kingdom: Animalia
- Phylum: Mollusca
- Class: Gastropoda
- Subclass: Caenogastropoda
- Order: Neogastropoda
- Superfamily: Conoidea
- Family: Pseudomelatomidae
- Genus: Comitas
- Species: C. salebrosa

Binomial name
- Comitas salebrosa (G.F. Harris, 1897)7

Synonyms
- Pleurotoma salebrosa G.F.Harris, 1897

= Comitas salebrosa =

Extinct species of gastropod

Comitas salebrosa is an extinct species of sea snail, a marine gastropod mollusc in the family Pseudomelatomidae.

== Description ==
Pimensions: length 33.5 mm; breadth 12 mm; length of the aperture 17 mm.

(Original description) The fusiform shell contains eight whorls. In the young growth is flat. In the neanic and ephebic stages the whorls are subangulately convex, rapidly increasing in size. The protoconch consists of two smooth whorls, globose, the later whorl being wider than the succeeding whorl. The sculpture consists of 13 to 14 deep, undulating sulcations on each whorl of the spire. The body whorl is sulcated throughout in a similar manner. The lines of growth are not very conspicuous, but the surface of the shell is peculiarly, distantly corrugated. These corrugations number five on the penultimate whorl, and rise into indistinct, broad, oblique ribs. The aperture is pyriform and much contracted in front. The outer lip is thin and slightly sulcated within. The broad and shallow sinus is situated about halfway between the peripheral subangulation and the suture. The columella is smooth, striated vertically, but not callous, twisted in front. The siphonal canal is long and broad at its extremity.

== Distribution ==
This extinct marine species was found in late Eocene strata in Victoria, Australia.
