= Comitas latescens =

Scientific classification
- Kingdom: Animalia
- Phylum: Mollusca
- Class: Gastropoda
- Subclass: Caenogastropoda
- Order: Neogastropoda
- Superfamily: Conoidea
- Family: Pseudomelatomidae
- Genus: Comitas
- Species: C. latescens

Binomial name
- Comitas latescens (Hutton, 1873)

Synonyms
- Pleurotoma latescens Hutton, 1873 (original combination)

Extinct species of gastropod

Comitas latescens is an extinct species of sea snails, a marine gastropod mollusc in the family Pseudomelatomidae, the turrids and allies.

== Description ==
The length of the shell attains 21.5 mm, its diameter 10.1 mm.

The fusiform shell has an acute spire. The rounded whorls are closely spirally striated. The spire whorls are obliquely plicated. There is a deep, broad groove at the suture. The aperture is ovate. The siphonal canal is rather produced. The body whorl is shorter than the spire.

== Distribution ==
This extinct marine species was endemic to New Zealand and was found off Mount Brown.
