= Comitas raybaudii =

Scientific classification
- Kingdom: Animalia
- Phylum: Mollusca
- Class: Gastropoda
- Subclass: Caenogastropoda
- Order: Neogastropoda
- Superfamily: Conoidea
- Family: Pseudomelatomidae
- Genus: Comitas
- Species: C. raybaudii

Binomial name
- Comitas raybaudii Bozzetti, 1994

Species of gastropod

Comitas raybaudii is a species of sea snail, a marine gastropod mollusk in the family Pseudomelatomidae, the turrids and allies.

== Description ==
The length of the shell attains 46 mm.

== Distribution ==
This species occurs in the Indian Ocean off Somalia.

== External linkls ==
- "Comitas raybaudii". Gastropods.com.
- Tucker, J.K. (2004). "Catalog of recent and fossil turrids (Mollusca: Gastropoda)" (PDF). Zootaxa. 682: 1–1295. doi:10.11646/zootaxa.682.1.1.
