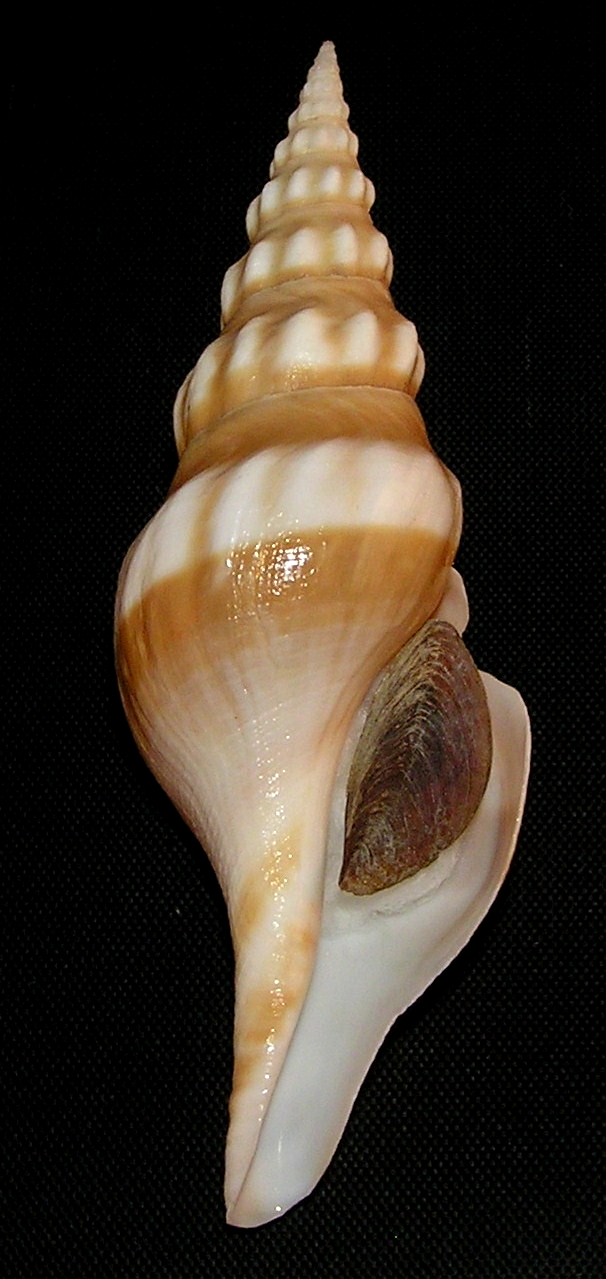
- Apertural view of a shell of Comitas kaderlyi

Scientific classification
- Kingdom: Animalia
- Phylum: Mollusca
- Class: Gastropoda
- Subclass: Caenogastropoda
- Order: Neogastropoda
- Superfamily: Conoidea
- Family: Pseudomelatomidae
- Genus: Comitas
- Species: C. kaderlyi

Binomial name
- Comitas kaderlyi Lischke, 1872

Synonyms
- Comitas kaderleyi (Lischke, 1872); Pleurotoma kaderlyi Lischke, 1872; Surcula kaderlyi (Lischke, 1872)

= Comitas kaderlyi =

Species of gastropod

Comitas kaderlyi, common name Kaderly's turrid, is a species of sea snail, a marine gastropod mollusc in the family Pseudomelatomidae, the turrids and allies.

== Description ==
The length of the shell varies between 44 mm and 100 mm.

The whorls are subangulated with about twelve oblique, rounded, longitudinal ribs below the angle. The surface is decussated by growth lines and small revolving striae. The shell is yellowish white, with orange-brown bands on the shoulder, at the base and intermediately three in all, the upper one appearing on the spire.

== Distribution ==
This marine species occurs off Japan, the Philippines, and Madagascar.
