= Comitas pachycercus =

Scientific classification
- Kingdom: Animalia
- Phylum: Mollusca
- Class: Gastropoda
- Subclass: Caenogastropoda
- Order: Neogastropoda
- Superfamily: Conoidea
- Family: Pseudomelatomidae
- Genus: Comitas
- Species: C. pachycercus

Binomial name
- Comitas pachycercus Sysoev & Bouchet, 2001

Synonyms
- Comitas pachycerus Sysoev & Bouchet, 2001 (misspelling)

Species of gastropod

Comitas pachycercus is a species of sea snails, a marine gastropod mollusc in the family Pseudomelatomidae.

== Distribution ==
This marine species occurs off New Caledonia.
