= Comitas spencerensis =

Scientific classification
- Kingdom: Animalia
- Phylum: Mollusca
- Class: Gastropoda
- Subclass: Caenogastropoda
- Order: Neogastropoda
- Superfamily: Conoidea
- Family: Pseudomelatomidae
- Genus: Comitas
- Species: C. spencerensis

Binomial name
- Comitas spencerensis E.W.J. Moore, 1962

Extinct species of gastropod

Comitas spencerensis is an extinct species of sea snail, a marine gastropod mollusk in the family Pseudomelatomidae, the turrids and allies. It was first described by paleontologist Ellen James Moore in 1962 from Miocene fossils of the Astoria Formation in Oregon, United States. The species was tentatively assigned to the genus Comitas by Moore, who noted that its generic placement was uncertain and that further study might require the establishment of a new genus.

== Description ==
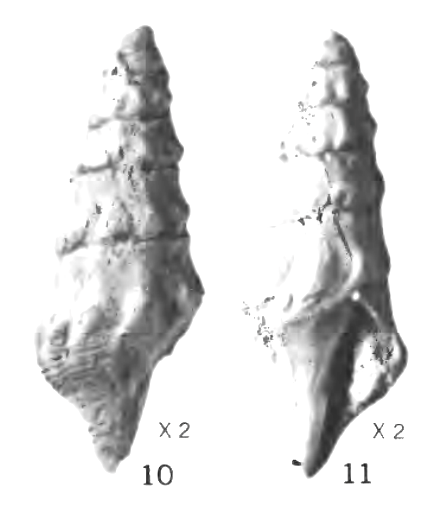
Comitas spencerensis

The shell is fusiform and of medium size with a relatively thin structure. It is high-spired, with the spire reaching at least twice the height of the aperture. The suture is sinuous and overlapping and lacks a collar. The anal sinus is shallow, with its maximum indentation occurring at the angulation of the shoulder. The shell sculpture consists of flat-topped spiral cords intersected by elongated axial nodes. The siphonal canal appears to have been short and straight. The length of the incomplete shell reaches about 24 mm, with a diameter of approximately 10 mm.

== Distribution ==
Fossils of this species have been found in the Astoria Formation of Oregon, dating to the Miocene. The holotype specimen (USNM 563197) was collected from beach cliffs about 600 yards north of Spencer Creek in siltstone layers approximately 5–6 feet thick and about 8 feet above the base of the exposed section. Additional specimens have been reported from several localities within the Astoria Formation in Oregon, indicating that the species was relatively common at some sites near Spencer Creek.

== Etymology ==
The species name spencerensis refers to Spencer Creek, Oregon, near which the type locality is situated.

== External linkls ==
- Worldwide Mollusc Species Data Base: Comitas spencerensis
