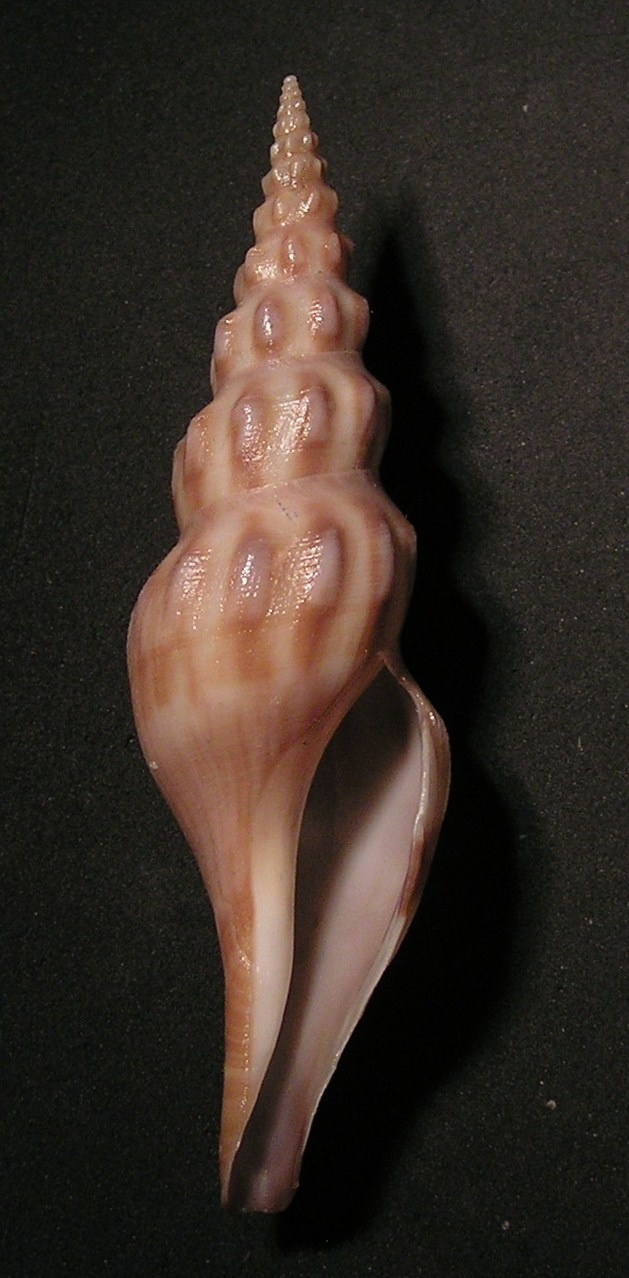
- Apertural view of a shell of Comitas peelae

Scientific classification
- Kingdom: Animalia
- Phylum: Mollusca
- Class: Gastropoda
- Subclass: Caenogastropoda
- Order: Neogastropoda
- Superfamily: Conoidea
- Family: Pseudomelatomidae
- Genus: Comitas
- Species: C. peelae

Binomial name
- Comitas peelae Bozzetti, 1993

= Comitas peelae =

Species of gastropod

Comitas peelae is a species of sea snail, a marine gastropod mollusk in the family Pseudomelatomidae, the turrids and allies.

== Description ==
The length of the shell varies between 50 mm and 105 mm.

== Distribution ==
This marine species occurs off Réunion and the Philippines.
