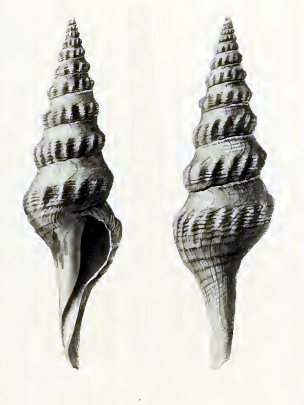
- Original image of a shell of Leucosyrinx pagodaeformis

Scientific classification
- Kingdom: Animalia
- Phylum: Mollusca
- Class: Gastropoda
- Subclass: Caenogastropoda
- Order: Neogastropoda
- Superfamily: Conoidea
- Family: Pseudomelatomidae
- Genus: Leucosyrinx
- Species: L. pagodaeformis

Binomial name
- Leucosyrinx pagodaeformis ( Schepman, 1913)

Synonyms
- Drillia pagodaeformis Schepman, 1913; Comitas pagodaeformis (Schepman, 1913) superseded combination

= Leucosyrinx pagodaeformis =

Species of mollusc

Leucosyrinx pagodaeformis is a species of sea snail, a marine gastropod mollusc in the family Pseudomelatomidae, the turrids and allies.

== Description ==
The length of the shell attains 28.5 mm, its diameter 8 mm.

(Original description) The moderately solid shell has an elongately fusiform, shape. It is light yellowish-brown, lighter on the siphonal canal. it contains about 11 whorls, of which about 1½ form a smooth, inflated, laterally inclined protoconch. The subsequent whorls are angular, very convex, separated by a linear, undulated suture, accompanied by a faint infrasutural rib, more conspicuous on upper whorls . The upper part of whorls is conspicuously excavated, the lower part contains strong, short, nodulous, oblique ribs, abruptly ending at the excavation, scarcely reaching the basal suture in the lower whorls. There are 3 faint, raised, spiral lirae in the excavation, crossed by elegantly curved, partly riblike striae, 4 to 5 stronger lirae crossing the ribs, with a few faint striae above them on the limit between ribs and excavation in the lower whorls. On the penultimate whorl, another liration appears at some distance above the suture, amounting to 3 rather remote, strong lirae on the body whorl, and a large number (about 20) on the basal part of the body whorl and siphonal canal. The body whorl is strongly attenuated below, ending in a long, slightly curved siphonal canal. The aperture is ovate, probably with a rather wide, deep sinus (the peristome is broken). The columellar margin is concave above, strongly contorted below, with a thin layer of enamel.

The species is most similar to Leucosyrinx breviplicata, differing in the more broadly-spaced spiral cords on the shell periphery.

== Distribution ==
This marine species occurs in the Banda Sea near Indonesia; also off Northwest Australia at depths between 300 m and 411 m.
