= Comitas terrisae =

Scientific classification
- Kingdom: Animalia
- Phylum: Mollusca
- Class: Gastropoda
- Subclass: Caenogastropoda
- Order: Neogastropoda
- Superfamily: Conoidea
- Family: Pseudomelatomidae
- Genus: Comitas
- Species: C. terrisae

Binomial name
- Comitas terrisae Vella, 1954

Extinct species of gastropod

Comitas terrisae is an extinct species of sea snail, a marine gastropod mollusc in the family Pseudomelatomidae, the turrids and allies.

== Description ==
The length of the shell attains 20.5 mm, its diameter 7.5 mm.

== Distribution ==
This extinct species is endemic to New Zealand. Fossils were found in Tertiary strata of Southeast Wairarapa.
