= Comitas malayana =

Scientific classification
- Kingdom: Animalia
- Phylum: Mollusca
- Class: Gastropoda
- Subclass: Caenogastropoda
- Order: Neogastropoda
- Superfamily: Conoidea
- Family: Pseudomelatomidae
- Genus: Comitas
- Species: C. malayana

Binomial name
- Comitas malayana (Thiele, 1925)

Synonyms
- Surcula malayana Thiele, 1925 (original combination)

Species of gastropod

Comitas malayana is a species of sea snail, a marine gastropod mollusc in the family Pseudomelatomidae, the turrids and allies.

== Distribution ==
This marine species occurs off East and North Sumatra, Indonesia.
