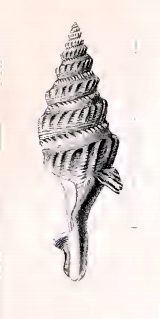
- Original image of a shell of Comitas obliquicosta

Scientific classification
- Kingdom: Animalia
- Phylum: Mollusca
- Class: Gastropoda
- Subclass: Caenogastropoda
- Order: Neogastropoda
- Superfamily: Conoidea
- Family: Pseudomelatomidae
- Genus: Comitas
- Species: C. obliquicosta

Binomial name
- Comitas obliquicosta (von Martens, 1901)

Synonyms
- Pleurotoma (Surcula) obliquicosta Martens, 1901; Surcula obliquicosta (Martens, 1901)

= Comitas obliquicosta =

Species of gastropod

Comitas obliquicosta is a species of sea snail, a marine gastropod mollusc in the family Pseudomelatomidae.

== Description ==
The length of the shell attains 47 mm, its diameter is 19 mm.

== Distribution ==
This marine species occurs off Western Sumatra, Indonesia.
