= Comitas vezzaroi =

Scientific classification
- Kingdom: Animalia
- Phylum: Mollusca
- Class: Gastropoda
- Subclass: Caenogastropoda
- Order: Neogastropoda
- Superfamily: Conoidea
- Family: Pseudomelatomidae
- Genus: Comitas
- Species: C. vezzaroi

Binomial name
- Comitas vezzaroi Cossignani, 2016

Species of gastropod

Comitas vezzaroi is a species of sea snail, a marine gastropod mollusc in the family Pseudomelatomidae, the turrids and allies.

== Description ==
The length of the shell attains 56.4 mm.

== Distribution ==
This marine species occurs off Darwin, Australia.
