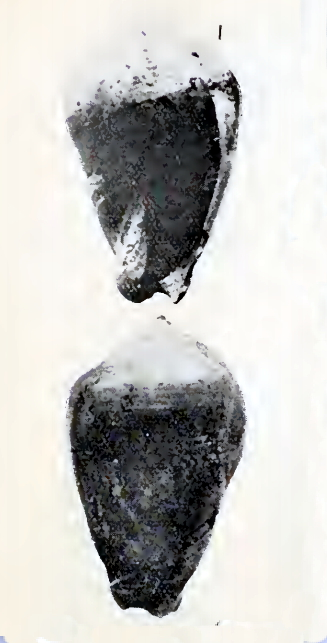
- Original image of a shell of Comitas latiaxialis

Scientific classification
- Kingdom: Animalia
- Phylum: Mollusca
- Class: Gastropoda
- Subclass: Caenogastropoda
- Order: Neogastropoda
- Superfamily: Conoidea
- Family: Pseudomelatomidae
- Genus: Comitas
- Species: C. latiaxialis

Binomial name
- Comitas latiaxialis (P. Marshall, 1918)

Synonyms
- † Surcula latiaxialis P. Marshall, 1918

= Comitas latiaxialis =

Extinct species of gastropod

Comitas latiaxialis is an extinct species of sea snail, a marine gastropod mollusc in the family Pseudomelatomidae.

== Description ==
The length of the shell attains 34 mm, its diameter 11mm.

(Original description) The shape of the shell is fusiform. It hias a long spire of 5 whorls, which are strongly convex. The aperture is slightly longer than the spire, but oval in shape, though rather prolonged anteriorly. The columella is distinctly bulging at the point where the aperture narrows to the anterior canal.

Ornamentation : 7 prominent axial ribs in each whorl. These extend to the anterior suture, which bends forward slightly at the points where the axials reach it. Posteriorly the axial sutures stop short of the suture. Anteriorly the sutures are margined by a strong ridge, which is itself marked by extremely fine spiral lines. The whorls are marked by numerous fine spiral lines, which traverse the axial ribs as well as the other parts of the whorl. The spiral lines are finer and more numerous in the posterior part of the whorl, and are coarsest where they cross the axials. These are crossed by irregular lines of growth, the form of which indicate that the anal sinus was relatively shallow. The outer lip is not sufficiently well preserved to demonstrate that point.

== Distribution ==
This marine species is endemic to New Zealand and fossils were found in Tertiary strata of Pakaurangi Point, Kaipara Harbour.
