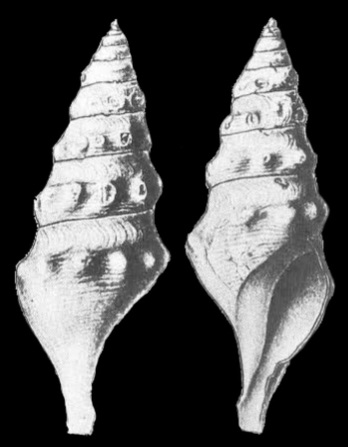
- Shell of Leucosyrinx arcana (holotype)

Scientific classification
- Kingdom: Animalia
- Phylum: Mollusca
- Class: Gastropoda
- Subclass: Caenogastropoda
- Order: Neogastropoda
- Superfamily: Conoidea
- Family: Pseudomelatomidae
- Genus: Leucosyrinx
- Species: L. arcana

Binomial name
- Leucosyrinx arcana (E. A. Smith, 1899)

Synonyms
- Comitas arcana (E. A. Smith, 1899) ·; Pleurotoma (Surcula) arcana E. A. Smith, 1899 superseded combination; Pleurotoma arcana E. A. Smith, 1899 superseded combination

= Leucosyrinx arcana =

Species of gastropod

Leucosyrinx arcana is a species of sea snail, a marine gastropod mollusc in the family Pseudomelatomidae, the turrids and allies.

== Description ==
The length of the shell attains 25 mm, its diameter 9 mm.

(Original description in Latin) The shell is fusiform and dirty whitish in colour, covered by a thin olive-green periostracum. The spire is acuminate, high, and distinctly turreted.

The shell consists of approximately ten whorls. Each whorl has a sloping, slightly concave subsutural area and is sharply angled below. The shoulder bears a series of rather acute tubercles, numbering about 12 on the body whorl. The surface is sculptured with fine, flexuous growth lines and delicate spiral striae. The body whorl narrows anteriorly into a distinct rostrum (siphonal canal) and is ornamented with transverse spiral striae.

The aperture is provided with an anterior siphonal canal and measures slightly less than one-half of the total shell length. The outer lip is thin, with a broad but moderately deep anal sinus in its upper portion, while its median section projects outward in a smooth arcuate curve. The columella is slightly oblique, white, and coated with a thin callus.

== Distribution ==
This marine species occurs off the Gulf of Aden to Andaman Islands and Indonesia at depths between 340m and 2000 m.
