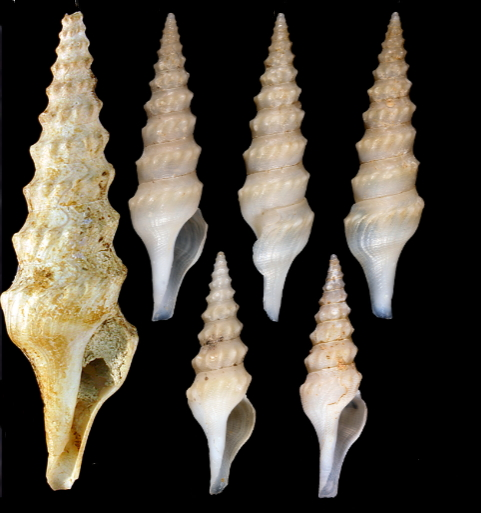
- Shells of Leucosyrinx claviforma

Scientific classification
- Kingdom: Animalia
- Phylum: Mollusca
- Class: Gastropoda
- Subclass: Caenogastropoda
- Order: Neogastropoda
- Superfamily: Conoidea
- Family: Pseudomelatomidae
- Genus: Leucosyrinx
- Species: L. claviforma

Binomial name
- Leucosyrinx claviforma (Kosuge, 1992)

Synonyms
- Comitas claviforma Kosuge, 1992

= Leucosyrinx claviforma =

Species of gastropod

Leucosyrinx claviforma is a species of sea snail, a marine gastropod mollusk in the family Pseudomelatomidae, the turrids and allies.

== Description ==
The shell is medium-sized, reaching more than 38 mm in length. It is thin but solid, narrowly fusiform, and characterized by a very high spire and a light yellowish coloration. The protoconch is small and paucispiral, consisting of nearly two convex, evenly rounded, and smooth whorls.

The teleoconch whorls are distinctly angulated at the shoulder and exhibit a distinctly concave subsutural ramp; on the body whorl the shoulder may become weakly and roundly angular at the transition to the shell base. The suture is shallow and impressed. The shoulder of the teleoconch whorls bears strong, oblique, broad, and rounded axial folds. These folds fade on the subsutural ramp, become strongly weaker toward the lower suture, and disappear shortly below the shoulder on the body whorl. The number of folds per whorl increases with shell size, reaching 17–18 on the body whorl.

The spiral sculpture is rather distinct and consists of closely spaced, low, rounded cords that are straight on the subsutural ramp and wavy below the suture, extending over the entire shell surface. The shell base is strongly to weakly convex and passes smoothly into a long, straight canal. The aperture is narrow and elongate-oval and is poorly differentiated from the siphonal canal. A deep, subsutural, broadly arcuate anal sinus extends across the subsutural ramp and is confluent with the large forward extension of the outer lip.

The radula is short and comprises around 25 rows of teeth, of which 8–9 are nascent. The radula is morphologically similar in both examined specimens. The marginal teeth are duplex and relatively long, measuring approximately 205–290 µm in length, corresponding to 4.8–6.2% of the aperture length excluding the canal. The major limb is moderately narrow, lanceolate in dorsal view, and curved. The accessory limb is narrow, constitutes less than half of the tooth width, and continues the overall morphology as described (you can insert the exact remaining phrase here if needed, e.g., proportion of total tooth length and socket details).

== Distribution ==
This marine species occurs off Western Australia, the Maldive Islands, Papua New Guinea, the Solomon Islands and the Bismarck Sea at depths between 370 m and 1170 m.
