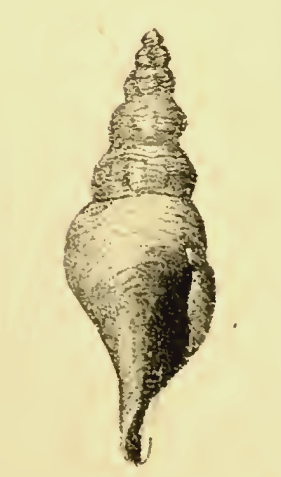
- Shell of Comitas clarae (holotype)

Scientific classification
- Kingdom: Animalia
- Phylum: Mollusca
- Class: Gastropoda
- Subclass: Caenogastropoda
- Order: Neogastropoda
- Superfamily: Conoidea
- Family: Pseudomelatomidae
- Genus: Comitas
- Species: C. clarae

Binomial name
- Comitas clarae (Tenison Woods, 1880)

Synonyms
- † Borsonia clarae, Cossmann, 1896; † Comitas (Carinacomitas) clarae (Tenison-Woods, 1880); † Drillia clarae, Cossman, 1906; † Pleurotoma clarae, Tenison Woods, 1880; † Pleurotoma (Surcula) clarae, Tate and Dennant, 1895

= Comitas clarae =

Extinct species of gastropod

Comitas clarae is an extinct species of sea snail, a marine gastropod mollusc in the family Pseudomelatomidae.

== Description ==
Dimensions: length 17.5 mm; breadth 6 mm length of the aperture 9 mm.

(Original description) The shell is elongate, fusiform, and thin. The posterior part of the spire is ribbed, anteriorly the ribs become obsolete. The shoulder of body whorl is obtusely angulate. The entire external surface of the whorls is covered with small, closely-set spiral lirae. The aperture is broad. The broad sinus is situated near the suture.

This fossil must be mainly distinguished by the absence of any sculpture. The upper part of the spire is ribbed and in the lower whorls, these ribs become obsolete. The periphery of the last whorl is obtusely angular and the whole shell is covered spirally with close fine thread-like lirae. The aperture is broad and the sinus wide, deep, and conspicuous. A peculiarity in this shell is that the lines of growth scarcely show at all.

== Distribution ==
This extinct marine species was found in Middle Eocene strata in Victoria, Australia.
