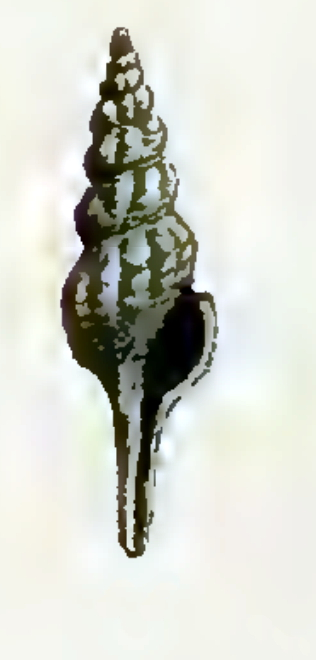
- Original image of a shell of Comitas wynyardensis

Scientific classification
- Kingdom: Animalia
- Phylum: Mollusca
- Class: Gastropoda
- Subclass: Caenogastropoda
- Order: Neogastropoda
- Superfamily: Conoidea
- Family: Pseudomelatomidae
- Genus: Comitas
- Species: C. wynyardensis

Binomial name
- Comitas wynyardensis (G.B. Pritchard, 1896)

Synonyms
- Pleurotoma wynyardensis G.B. Pritchard, 1896

= Comitas wynyardensis =

Extinct species of gastropod

Comitas wynyardensis is an extinct species of sea snail, a marine gastropod mollusc in the family Pseudomelatomidae, the turrids and allies.

== Description ==
The length of this species attains 27 mm, its diameter 8 mm.

(Original description) The shell is of small to medium size, somewhat narrow elongate fusiform. The aperture and the siphonal canal have about the same length as the spire. The spire is acute, made up of a rather small embryonic portion, succeeded by numerous, gradually increasing, convex, and more or less strongly costated whorls. The apical angle is about twenty-five to thirty degrees. The protoconch is rather small, consisting of about 1 1/2 smooth convex whorls. The spire consistis of seven or eight regularly convex whorls, with their greatest convexity about the middle of each whorl, and with a well-impressed suture.. The aperture is oval. The outer lip is rather thin and smooth internally, with a well-defined broad but comparatively shallow sinus just below the suture. From the sinus the lip projects slightly forward with a regular convex arch, then curving downwards to join the anterior canal. The sinuses about one to one-and-a-half millimetre broad, but usually only about half this measurement in depth. At the anterior end the aperture opens into a long, straight, slender and open siphonal canal, which is much longer than the aperture. The inner lip shows a thin enamel coating. The columella is simple and smooth, straight, slender, and gently tapering to the anterior end. The surface is ornamented with oblique ribs, which are most highly elevated about the middle of each whorl, and fade off more rapidly towards the posterior suture than the anterior. The ribs number usually nine to a whorl, an occasional example shows as many as eleven or twelve on the body whorl. The strength of development of the ribs is somewhat variable, especially on the anterior whorls, where they are occasionally only just visible. The ribs are traversed by comparatively coarse and fine spiral threads. Of these there are four to six coarser and more prominent than the rest, situated in the anterior two-thirds of each whorl, especially prominent where they cross the ribs, more numerous, amounting to about eight or nine, on the body whorl, with much broader interspaces between each of which has a medial finer thread with a pair of still tinier threads on either side of it. The posterior third is occupied by from about ten to fifteen very fine spiral threadlets, also the fine lines of growth of the sinus are in this space. Both ribs and spiral threads are traversed by the fine oblique forwardly directed lines of growth.

== Distribution ==
This marine species is endemic to Australia. Fossils have been found in Eocene strata of Table Cape, Tasmania
