= Comitas rex =

Scientific classification
- Kingdom: Animalia
- Phylum: Mollusca
- Class: Gastropoda
- Subclass: Caenogastropoda
- Order: Neogastropoda
- Superfamily: Conoidea
- Family: Pseudomelatomidae
- Genus: Comitas
- Species: C. rex

Binomial name
- Comitas rex Sysoev, 1997

Species of gastropod

Comitas rex is a species of sea snail, a marine gastropod mollusc in the family Pseudomelatomidae, the turrids and allies

== Description ==
A solid, fusiform elongated shell, with a thin light brown periostracum. It has a high, turreted spire, with 13.5 whorls. Opposite to the whorl periphery is a reddish-brown band, forming dark rectangular blotches on axial ribs. The length of the shell attains 87 mm, its diameter 27.5 mm.

== Distribution ==
This marine species occurs in the Tanimbar Islands, Indonesia.
