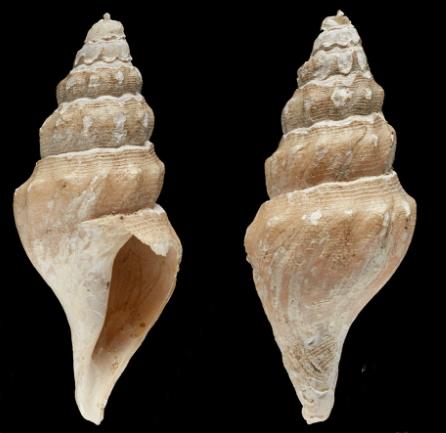
- Shell of Leucosyrinx paupera (lectotype at NHMUK)

Scientific classification
- Kingdom: Animalia
- Phylum: Mollusca
- Class: Gastropoda
- Subclass: Caenogastropoda
- Order: Neogastropoda
- Superfamily: Conoidea
- Family: Pseudomelatomidae
- Genus: Leucosyrinx
- Species: L. paupera

Binomial name
- Leucosyrinx paupera (Watson, 1881)

Synonyms
- Comitas paupera (R. B. Watson, 1881); Pleurotoma paupera Watson, 1881; Pleurotoma (Drillia) paupera Watson, 1881 (original combination); Pleurotoma (Typhlomangelia) paupera Watson 1886; Turricula paupera Powell 1969

= Leucosyrinx paupera =

Species of gastropod

Leucosyrinx paupera is a species of sea snail, a marine gastropod mollusk in the family Pseudomelatomidae.

== Description ==
(Original description) The yellowish-buff shell has a fusiform, biconical, shortly shape. It is sometimes feebly ribbed, smoothish, with a slightly constricted suture.

Sculpture: Longitudinals—above the middle of each whorl is a row of tubercles, which stand out on the upper whorls rather sharp and rounded, but on the lower whorls are elongated into slight, oblique ribs, which tend to become obsolete on the body whorl, and do not extend to the base. They are parted by shallow rounded furrows, which are a good deal broader than the ribs. There are about thirteen of these on each whorl. They do not extend in the least to the sinus area above the tubercles. The surface is very closely scored with coarse lines of growth. Spirals—the line of the tubercles forms a rather acute carination, of which there is hardly a trace in the curve of the whorls themselves. The whole surface is covered with harsh, unequal, irregular, flatly rounded threads, which are cut into small coarse granulations by the lines of growth. This sculpture is most developed on the base and aperture, less so in the sinus area, least so of all on the rib area.

The colour of the shell is buff below the yellow epidermis, which is coarse and harsh, but not thick. The surface of the shell below it is smooth and free from the granulated texture, but is curiously reticulated by minute interrupted wrinkles, whose course is at right angles to the lines of growth.

The spire is high and conical.; Its profile lines are little interrupted by the contraction of the suture. The protoconch is eroded in all the specimens. The shell contains 10 to 11 (?) whorls. These are regular, of rather rapid increase, shortish, with a largish, sloping, but hardly concave shoulder above and a very slight contraction below. They are regulated by the projection of the line of tubercles, but are otherwise little convex. The body whorl is a little tumid and considerably elongated, a little contracted on the base, and gradually drawn out into the conical, straight, longish, and at the end smallish snout. The suture is rather deep, and strongly marked by the angle at which the superior and inferior whorls meet.

The aperture is buff-coloured within, rather long and narrow, pear-shaped, pointed above, with a longish, broad, and open siphonal canal below. The direction is very little oblique. The outer lip curves pretty equally from its origin to the edge of the siphonal canal, from which to the point of the snout its course is nearly straight. On leaving the body it retires at once, but very slightly and regularly, so as to form the shallow and openly rounded sinus, from which it advances with a long and regular sweep to the front of the aperture, and then curves slowly backward to the point of the snout. It is thin throughout. Above it is straight, but lower down a little patulous. The inner lip spreads rather broadly across the columella, highly polished, buff-coloured, with a slightly raised edge. It is very little concave above, straight but rather short on the columella, which is cut off to a long fine point, with a blunt, rounded, very slightly twisted strongish edge.

== Distribution ==
This marine species occurs off Indonesia, Gulf of Aden, Gulf of Oman and in the Arafura Sea.
