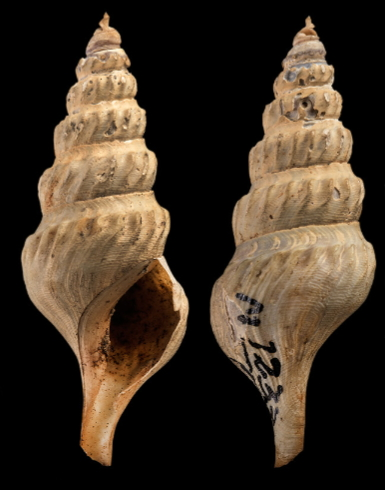
- Shell of Leucosyrinx thisbe (holotype)

Scientific classification
- Kingdom: Animalia
- Phylum: Mollusca
- Class: Gastropoda
- Subclass: Caenogastropoda
- Order: Neogastropoda
- Superfamily: Conoidea
- Family: Pseudomelatomidae
- Genus: Leucosyrinx
- Species: L. thisbe

Binomial name
- Leucosyrinx thisbe (E. A. Smith, 1906)

Synonyms
- Comitas thisbe (E. A. Smith, 1906) superseded combination; Pleurotoma (Surcula) thisbe E. A. Smith, 1906 superseded combination; Pleurotoma thisbe E. A. Smith, 1906 superseded combination

= Leucosyrinx thisbe =

Species of gastropod

Leucosyrinx thisbe is a species of sea snail, a marine gastropod mollusk in the family Pseudomelatomidae, the turrids and allies.

== Description ==
The length of the shell of the holotype attains 44 mm, its diameter 14 mm.

(Original description in Latin) The dull whitish shell is fusiform and turreted. The shell has about ten whorls; the upper whorls are eroded, while the remaining whorls are concave above and somewhat convex in their middle part. They are sculptured with fine, oblique folds or ribs, which become attenuated below and scarcely extend to the suture, and they also bear very fine, sinuous growth lines. Below the concave area, and both above and below the ribs, the surface is finely striated transversely.

The body whorl is strongly contracted anteriorly and is transversely striated. The aperture is elongate and anteriorly channeled. The outer lip is thin, broadly and moderately deeply sinuate at the suture, and it is arched and projecting in its middle portion. The columella is curved and is covered by a thin, smooth callus that forms a circumscribed deposit.

(More recent description by Kantor et al.) The large shell reaches about 75 mm in length. it is broadly fusiform, and thick and solid, with a high spire and a coloration ranging from greyish to light brownish. The protoconch is unknown. The teleoconch whorls are distinctly and roundly angular at the shoulder, and the subsutural ramp is markedly deepened relative to the shoulder, being concave or nearly flat-sided. A moderately to strongly developed subsutural cord is present, and the suture is channeled.

The last and penultimate whorls bear 18–19 strong, oblique, and sinuous axial folds on and below the shoulder; on the upper whorls these folds reach the lower suture, and on the body whorl they extend down to the shell base. The spiral sculpture is well developed and consists of rather broad, low, rounded, and wavy cords of similar width over the entire shell surface, including the subsutural ramp, with interspaces narrower than the cords themselves. The shell base is moderately convex and passes rapidly into a medium-long, straight siphonal canal. The aperture is rather broad and elongate-oval and is well differentiated from the siphonal canal. A well-developed white columellar and parietal callus is present. A deep, subsutural, broadly arcuate anal sinus extends across the subsutural ramp and is confluent with the large forward extension of the outer lip.

The radula is typical of the genus and bears duplex marginal teeth measuring approximately 570 µm in length, corresponding to 2.8% of the aperture length excluding the canal.

== Distribution ==
This marine species occurs off Sri Lanka and the Solomon Islands at depths between 1230 m and 1986 m.
