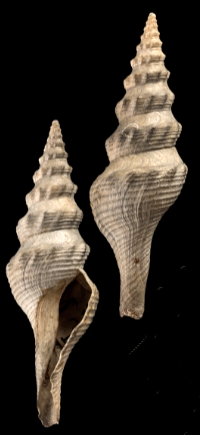
- Shell of Leucosyrinx breviplicata (holotype)

Scientific classification
- Kingdom: Animalia
- Phylum: Mollusca
- Class: Gastropoda
- Subclass: Caenogastropoda
- Order: Neogastropoda
- Superfamily: Conoidea
- Family: Pseudomelatomidae
- Genus: Leucosyrinx
- Species: L. breviplicata

Binomial name
- Leucosyrinx breviplicata (E. A. Smith, 1899)

Synonyms
- Comitas breviplicata (E. A. Smith, 1899); Pleurotoma (Surcula) breviplicata E. A. Smith, 1899 (basionym); Pleurotoma breviplicata E. A. Smith, 1899 (original combination)

= Leucosyrinx breviplicata =

Species of gastropod

Leucosyrinx breviplicata is a species of sea snail, a marine gastropod mollusk in the family Pseudomelatomidae, the turrids and allies.

== Description ==
(Original description in Latin) The shell is whitish, slender, and fusiform. The spire is turreted and acuminate. The shell has ten whorls; the uppermost whorl is subglobose and smooth, while the remaining whorls are angular in their middle part, concave above, and contracted below. They are sculptured with oblique folds, which do not extend beyond the angle, and below the middle they are ornamented with fine, transverse, thread-like lirae. Above, the surface is covered with very fine, curved growth lines. The body whorl is rostrate anteriorly and bears fine, oblique lirae.

The aperture, together with the siphonal canal, occupies about four tenths of the total shell length. The outer lip is thin, arched and projecting in its middle portion, and only shallowly sinuate near the suture. The columella is smooth and nearly straight. The canal is slightly oblique and narrow.

(More recent description by Kantor et al.) The shell is medium-sized, nearly reaching 50 mm in length. It is thin but strong, narrowly fusiform, with a high spire and a coloration ranging from off-white to light cream. The protoconch is small and paucispiral, consisting of 1.5–1.75 strongly convex, micro-shagreened whorls. The transition from protoconch to teleoconch is indistinct but is marked by the onset of the definitive sculpture. The teleoconch whorls are obtusely angular at the shoulder, and the subsutural ramp is weakly to moderately concave, becoming nearly flat on the last whorl in larger specimens. The suture is distinct and impressed.

In specimens with a shell length exceeding 40 mm, the body whorl bears 13–14 strong, oblique axial folds on and below the shoulder. These folds generally do not reach the lower suture on the teleoconch whorls and disappear shortly below the shoulder, only rarely extending to the periphery.

The spiral sculpture is well developed. On the subsutural ramp, there are 3–5 spiral cords of varying strength; on the upper whorls, thin cords below the ramp are separated by interspaces wider than the cords themselves, whereas on the last and penultimate whorls the cords are relatively broader and the interspaces are narrower than the cords. Immediately at the shoulder there are 4–5 narrower cords that cross the folds and are distinct on their summits. Below the shoulder, the spiral cords are more widely spaced, with interspaces one to three times the cord width. On the shell base and siphonal canal, the cords are more closely spaced and broader than those on the periphery. There are 30–37 cords on the body whorl below the shoulder.

The shell base is weakly to strongly convex and narrows gradually or rapidly as it passes into a long, sinuous siphonal canal. The aperture is narrow, elongate-oval, and well differentiated from the siphonal canal. A well-developed white columellar and parietal callus is present. A deep, subsutural, broadly arcuate anal sinus extends across the subsutural ramp and is confluent with the large forward extension of the outer lip.

The radulae in the examined specimens comprise 25–38 rows of teeth, of which 8–12 are nascent. The marginal teeth are similar in all studied specimens, duplex, and measure approximately 370–415 µm in length, corresponding to 3.4–3.5% of the aperture length excluding the canal. The major limb is narrow to moderately lanceolate in dorsal view and strongly curved. The accessory limb accounts for about half of the tooth width and is inserted into a distinct socket on the dorsal side of the major limb.

== Distribution ==
This marine species occurs off the Andaman and Nicobar Islands to the Solomon Islands and Western Australia at depths between 195 m to 609 m.
