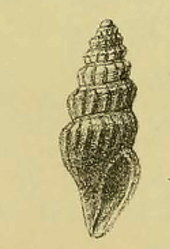
- Original drawing of a shell of Awateria crossei

Scientific classification
- Kingdom: Animalia
- Phylum: Mollusca
- Class: Gastropoda
- Subclass: Caenogastropoda
- Order: Neogastropoda
- Superfamily: Conoidea
- Family: Borsoniidae
- Genus: Awateria; Suter, 1917

Type species
- Awateria streptophora Suter, 1917

= Awateria =

Genus of gastropods

Awateria is a genus of sea snails, marine gastropod mollusks in the family Borsoniidae. Most species in this genus have become extinct.

== Description ==
In general shape and sculpture the type of this genus is reminiscent of Arcularia Link, 1807 (synonym of Nassarius Duméril, 1805), the protoconch is comparatively large. The fasciole runs between the wreath of subsutural nodules and the upright ribs. The canal is short, wide, and effuse. From Epideira Hedley, 1918, to which, it seems to be related, the larger protoconch, few and rapidly increasing whorls, the subcylindrical form and the shallow sinus of Awateria readily distinguish it.

== Species ==
Species within the genus Awateria include:

- Awateria crossei (Smith E. A., 1891)
- † Awateria defossa Powell, 1942
- † Awateria echinata Powell, 1942
- † Awateria evanida Suter, 1917
- Awateria hoylei (Smith E. A., 1891)
- † Awateria karakaensis Marwick, 1931
- † Awateria marwicki Powell, 1942
- † Awateria miocenica Vella, 1954
- Awateria optabilis (Murdoch & Suter, 1906)
- † Awateria retiolata L. C. King, 1933
- † Awateria streptophora Suter, 1917
- † Awateria striata Vella, 1954
- † Awateria thomsoni Powell, 1942
- † Awateria wairoaensis Powell, 1942
- Awateria watsoni (Smith E. A., 1891)

Species brought into synonymy

- † Awateria aliena Marwick, 1965 : synonym of † Taranis aliena (Marwick, 1965) (original combination)
- Awateria challengeri (Smith E. A., 1891): synonym of Belomitra challengeri (E. A. Smith, 1891)
- † Awateria expalliata Laws, 1947: synonym of † Mioawateria expalliata (Laws, 1947)
- † Awateria experta Laws, 1947: synonym of † Awheaturris experta (Laws, 1947) (original combination)
- † Awateria mollyae L. C. King, 1933: synonym of † Awateria retiolata L. C. King, 1933 (synonym)
- † Awateria personata Powell, 1942: synonym of † Mioawateria personata (Powell, 1942)
