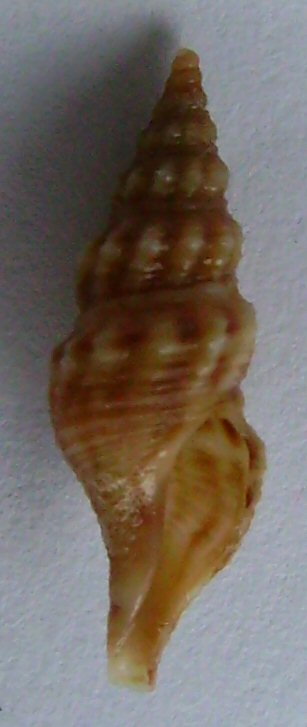
- A shell of Antimelatoma buchanani maorum

Scientific classification
- Kingdom: Animalia
- Phylum: Mollusca
- Class: Gastropoda
- Subclass: Caenogastropoda
- Order: Neogastropoda
- Superfamily: Conoidea
- Family: Pseudomelatomidae
- Genus: Antimelatoma; Powell, 1942

Type species
- Drillia maorum E.A. Smith, 1877

Species
- See text

= Antimelatoma =

Genus of gastropods

Antimelatoma is a genus of predatory sea snails, marine gastropod molluscs in the family Pseudomelatomidae, the turrids.

== Species ==
Species within the genus Antimelatoma include:

- Antimelatoma buchanani (Hutton, 1873)
- Antimelatoma eremita (Murdoch & Suter, 1906)
- † Antimelatoma quemadensis (Ihering, 1907) †
- † Antimelatoma waimea Beu, 2011

Species brought into synonymy

- Antimelatoma agasma Cotton, 1947: synonym of Splendrillia woodsi (Beddome, 1883)
- Antimelatoma ahipara Powell A. W. B, 1942: synonym of Antimelatoma buchanani (Hutton, 1873)
- Antimelatoma benthicola Powell A. W. B, 1942: synonym of Antimelatoma buchanani (Hutton, 1873)
- Antimelatoma canyonensis Dell, 1956: synonym of Leucosyrinx canyonensis (Dell, 1956)
