= Puha (gastropod) =

Scientific classification
- Kingdom: Animalia
- Phylum: Mollusca
- Class: Gastropoda
- Subclass: Caenogastropoda
- Order: Neogastropoda
- Superfamily: Conoidea
- Family: Raphitomidae
- Genus: †Puha; Marwick, 1931

Type species
- † Puha fulgida Marwick, 1931

Species
- See text

Extinct genus of gastropods

Puha is an extinct genus of sea snails, marine gastropod mollusks in the family Raphitomidae.

== Species ==
Species within the genus Puha include:

- † Puha fulgida Marwick, 1931
- † Puha hebes (Hutton, 1873)

Species brought into synonymy

- † Puha pusula Laws, 1947: synonym of † Acanthodaphne pusula (Laws, 1947) (original combination)
- † Puha sinusigera Powell, 1942: synonym of † Mioawateria sinusigera (Powell, 1942)
