= Gibberula ficula =

Scientific classification
- Kingdom: Animalia
- Phylum: Mollusca
- Class: Gastropoda
- Subclass: Caenogastropoda
- Order: Neogastropoda
- Family: Cystiscidae
- Subfamily: Cystiscinae
- Genus: Gibberula
- Species: G. ficula

Binomial name
- Gibberula ficula (Murdoch & Suter, 1906)

Synonyms
- Cryptospira (Gibberula) ficula Murdoch & Suter, 1906

Species of gastropod

Gibberula ficula is a species of sea snail, a marine gastropod mollusk, in the family Cystiscidae.

== Distribution ==
This species occurs in New Zealand Exclusive Economic Zone.
