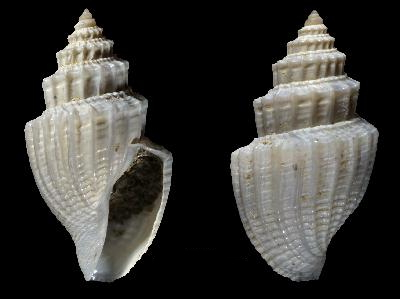
- Shell of Mioawateria vivens (holotype in MNHN, Paris)

Scientific classification
- Kingdom: Animalia
- Phylum: Mollusca
- Class: Gastropoda
- Subclass: Caenogastropoda
- Order: Neogastropoda
- Superfamily: Conoidea
- Family: Raphitomidae
- Genus: Mioawateria
- Species: M. vivens

Binomial name
- Mioawateria vivens Morassi & Bonfitto, 2013

= Mioawateria vivens =

Species of gastropod

Mioawateria vivens is a species of sea snail, a marine gastropod mollusk in the family Raphitomidae.

== Description ==
The length of the shell attains 12 mm. Compared to the rest of the genus, M. vivens has smaller dimensions (up to 6.4 mm vs. 8.2–9.9 mm in length), strongly shouldered whorls well above mid-whorl and absence of somewhat “crisp” axials on the sutural ramp.

== Distribution ==
This marine species occurs in the Gulf of Aden.

== Etymology ==
Vivens is Latin for "living", alluding to the fact that the new species is morphologically so close to the Miocene-Pliocene Mioawateria personata Powell, 1942 that observers speculate that it actually represents a living offshoot of the New Zealand species.
