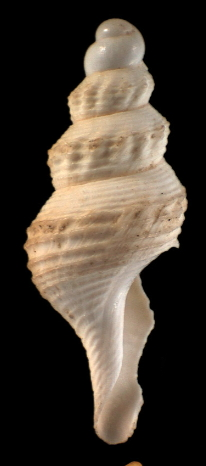
- Shell of Antimelatoma eremita (holotype at the Museum of New Zealand)

Scientific classification
- Kingdom: Animalia
- Phylum: Mollusca
- Class: Gastropoda
- Subclass: Caenogastropoda
- Order: Neogastropoda
- Superfamily: Conoidea
- Family: Pseudomelatomidae
- Genus: Antimelatoma
- Species: A. eremita

Binomial name
- Antimelatoma eremita (Murdoch & Suter, 1906)

Synonyms
- Leucosyrinx eremita (Murdoch & Suter, 1906); Liratilia eremita (Murdoch & Suter, 1906) (superseded combination); Pleurotoma (Leucosyrinx) eremita Murdoch & Suter, 1906 (superseded combination); Pleurotoma eremita Murdoch & Suter, 1906 (superseded combination)

= Antimelatoma eremita =

Species of gastropod

Antimelatoma eremita is a species of sea snail, a marine gastropod mollusk in the family Pseudomelatomidae, the turrids and allies.

== Description ==
The length of the shell attains 5.8 mm, its diameter 2.42 mm.

(Original description) The small, fusiform, fragile shell shows shouldered whorls. The body whorl is slightly shorter than the spire and ends in a rather short open siphonal canal. The sculpture consists of longitudinal and spiral threads and riblets, the former inclined slightly backward. They number about fifteen on the penultimate whorl and are obsolete above the angle, absent upon the greater part of the body whorl. The spirals consist of five minute threads on the slope above the angle. Beneath the latter there are four much stronger riblets, forming gemmules at the intersections of the longitudinals. The body whorl contains about twenty-three spirals, those upon the base and neck more widely spaced, but equally slender as those on the shoulder. The colour of the shell is light-cream. The spire is turriculate-conical, with a blunt apex. The protoconch is slightly bulbose, with about two smooth whorls, nucleus globular. The shell contains 5 whorls, angled at the periphery, straight above, slightly convex below. The base is convex, then contracted and ending in a short distally rounded beak. The suture is deep. The aperture is pyriform, broadly angled above, ending in a rather short almost straight siphonal canal, slightly turned to the left. The outer lip is imperfect, convex above, contracted near the base. It is evident from the growth lines that the sinus is broad, rounded, and moderately deep, extending almost from the suture to the keel. The inner lip forms a thin and narrow callosity on the almost straight columella, which is slightly twisted at the base.

In its shell characters this small species (shell length of the holotype 5.8 mm) is very different from Leucosyrinx, but fits well the morphology of the genus Antimelatoma Powell, 1942 (family Psudomelatomidae). It is identified as Antimelatoma in the collections of Museum of New Zealand Te Papa Tongarewa and this generic assignment is here followed.

== Distribution ==
This marine species occurs off North Island and is endemic to New Zealand.
