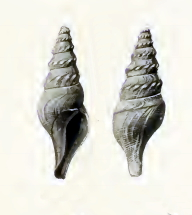
- Paracomitas undosa

Scientific classification
- Kingdom: Animalia
- Phylum: Mollusca
- Class: Gastropoda
- Subclass: Caenogastropoda
- Order: Neogastropoda
- Superfamily: Conoidea
- Family: Pseudomelatomidae
- Genus: Paracomitas; Powell, 1942

Type species
- † Surcula castlecliffensis (P. Marshall & R. Murdoch, 1919)

Species
- See text

Synonyms
- Macrosinus Beu, 1970; Paracomitas (Macrosinus) Beu, 1970 · accepted, alternate representation; Paracomitas (Paracomitas) Powell, 1942 · accepted, alternate representation

= Paracomitas =

Genus of gastropods

Paracomitas is a genus of sea snails, marine gastropod mollusks in the family Pseudomelatomidae.

== Description ==
The genus Paracomitas has a carinate protoconch which lies in the same cone as the spire, thus differing from typical Comitas in which the protoconch is noncarinate, bulbous and tilted. Although the type of Comitas, C. oamarutica (Suter), is Drillia-like in the ornamentation of its spire, some species referred to Comitas by Powell on the basis of the protoconch, such as Comitas allani Powell, are similar in adult sculpture to Paracomitas. The protoconch of the species here referred to Paracomitas is small and appears to be slightly tilted, and the last quarter-turn or less is slightly angulate, but not definitely carinate.

== Species ==
Species within the genus Paracomitas include:

- Paracomitas augusta (Murdoch & Suter, 1906)
- † Paracomitas beui Maxwell, 1988
- † Paracomitas flemingi (Beu, 1970)
- † Paracomitas gemmea (R. Murdoch, 1900)
- Paracomitas haumuria Beu, 1979
- † Paracomitas protransenna (P. Marshall & R. Murdoch, 1923)
- † Paracomitas rodgersi MacNeil, 1960

Alternate representations

- Paracomitas (Macrosinus) Beu, 1970 represented as Paracomitas Powell, 1942
- Paracomitas (Macrosinus) haumuria Beu, 1979 represented as Paracomitas haumuria Beu, 1979

Species brought into synonymy

- Paracomitas gypsata (Watson, 1881): synonym of Gymnobela gypsata (Watson, 1881)
- Paracomitas undosa (Schepman, 1913): synonym of Leucosyrinx undosa (Schepman, 1913)
