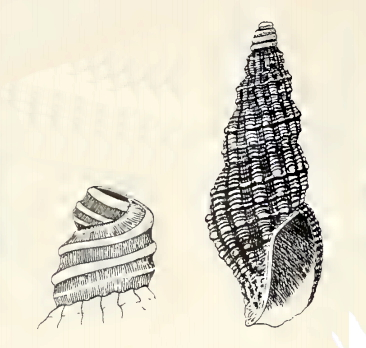
- Image of a shell (and its protoconch) of Liracraea epentroma

Scientific classification
- Kingdom: Animalia
- Phylum: Mollusca
- Class: Gastropoda
- Subclass: Caenogastropoda
- Order: Neogastropoda
- Superfamily: Conoidea
- Family: Mangeliidae
- Genus: Liracraea; Odhner, 1924

Type species
- Clathurella epentroma Murdoch, 1905

Species
- See text

= Liracraea =

Genus of gastropods

Liracraea is a genus of sea snails, marine gastropod mollusks in the family Mangeliidae.

== Species ==
Species within the genus Liracraea include:

- †Liracraea dictyota (Hutton, 1885)
- Liracraea epentroma (Murdoch, 1905)
- Liracraea odhneri Powell, 1942
- †Liracraea opimacosta Richardson, 1997
- Liracraea otakauica Powell, 1942
- †Liracraea titirangiensis Marwick, 1928
