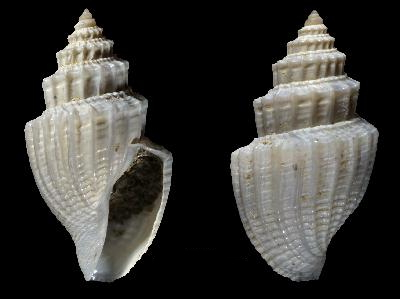
- Shell of Mioawateria vivens

Scientific classification
- Kingdom: Animalia
- Phylum: Mollusca
- Class: Gastropoda
- Subclass: Caenogastropoda
- Order: Neogastropoda
- Superfamily: Conoidea
- Family: Raphitomidae
- Genus: Mioawateria; Vella, 1954

Type species
- † Awateria personata Powell, 1942

Species
- 21 species (see text)

Synonyms
- Awateria (Mioawateria) Vella, 1954; Magnella Dittmer, 1960

= Mioawateria =

Genus of gastropods

Mioawateria is a genus of sea snails in the family Raphitomidae. These are generally small sea snails, with shells typically ranging from 4 mm to 12.5 mm in length. It was originally erected as a subgenus of Awateria. It was originally erected as a subgenus of Awateria.

== Species ==
There are 21 recognized species within the genus Mioawateria:

- † Mioawateria aitanga Grant-Mackie & Chapman-Smith, 1971
- † Mioawateria andersoni (Dittmer, 1960)
- Mioawateria asarotum Sysoev, 1997
- Mioawateria bigranulosa (Okutani, 1964)
- Mioawateria blakeana (Dall, 1881)
- Mioawateria brachis (Dall, 1919)
- Mioawateria clara (Thiele, 1925)
- Mioawateria ektonos Morassi & Bonfitto, 2010
- Mioawateria erronea (Thiele, 1925)
- † Mioawateria expalliata (Laws, 1947)
- Mioawateria extensa (Dall, 1881)
- Mioawateria extensaeformis (Schepman, 1913)
- † Mioawateria hondelattensis Lozouet, 2017
- Mioawateria imitator (Dall, 1927)
- Mioawateria isogonia (Dall, 1908)
- Mioawateria malmii (Dall, 1889)
- † Mioawateria personata (Powell, 1942)
- Mioawateria rhomboidea (Thiele, 1925)
- † Mioawateria sinusigera (Powell, 1942)
- Mioawateria vivens Morassi & Bonfitto, 2013
- Mioawateria watsoni (Dautzenberg, 1889)
