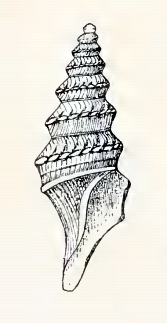
- Original image of a shell of Paracomitas augusta

Scientific classification
- Kingdom: Animalia
- Phylum: Mollusca
- Class: Gastropoda
- Subclass: Caenogastropoda
- Order: Neogastropoda
- Superfamily: Conoidea
- Family: Pseudomelatomidae
- Genus: Paracomitas
- Species: P. augusta

Binomial name
- Paracomitas augusta (Murdoch & Suter, 1906)

Synonyms
- Paracomitas (Paracomitas) augusta (Murdoch & Suter, 1906)· accepted, alternate representation; Paracomitas (Paracomitas) augusta augusta (Murdoch & Suter, 1906); Paracomitas augusta powelli Dell, 1956; Pleurotoma (Leucosyrinx) augusta R. Murdoch & Suter, 1906; Pleurotoma augusta Murdoch & Suter, 1906

= Paracomitas augusta =

Species of gastropod

Paracomitas augusta is a species of sea snail, a marine gastropod mollusk in the family Pseudomelatomidae, the turrids and allies.

== Description ==
The length of the shell attains 10.3 mm, its diameter 3.9 mm.

(Original description) The fusiform shell is slender and fragile The spire and the body whorl are of about the same length. The whorls with a spiral keel bear small nodules The siphonal canal is long.

Sculpture : The whorls are strongly keeled at the periphery and with a row of gemmules set slightly oblique thereon. On the body whorl there is a lower smooth keel present. A few inconspicuous spiral striae are on the area between the keels and on the anterior extremity. The axial sculpture consists of minute and irregular growth lines only. The colour is pure-white, slightly shining. The spire is pagodiform and elongated. The protoconch is smooth and shining, consisting of about two turns. The nucleus is slightly tilted, and with a distinctly marked smooth carina, which is much strengthened on the succeeding whorl. The shell contains 7 whorls, regularly and rather slowly increasing, the last biangulate, concave below the keels and produced into a rather long narrow and truncated beak. The suture is deep, minutely bimarginate. The aperture is angularly ovate, broadly angled above, contracted below and terminating in a rather long open siphonal canal, which is somewhat turned to the left. The outer lip has its margin not quite perfect, which perhaps lends to the scarcely fully adult appearance of the shell. It is biangled and concave above, between, and below the angles; sinus broad and moderately deep, extending almost from the suture to the keel. The inner lip spreads as a very thin narrow callus over the concave body and the columella, which is nearly straight and slightly twisted, ending in a fine point on the left margin of the siphonal canal.

== Distribution ==
This marine species is endemic to New Zealand.
