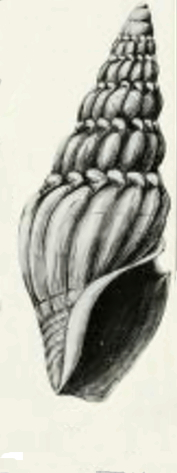
- Original image of a shell of Splendrillia subviridis

Scientific classification
- Kingdom: Animalia
- Phylum: Mollusca
- Class: Gastropoda
- Subclass: Caenogastropoda
- Order: Neogastropoda
- Superfamily: Conoidea
- Family: Drilliidae
- Genus: Splendrillia
- Species: S. subviridis

Binomial name
- Splendrillia subviridis (May, 1910)

Synonyms
- Drillia subviridis May, 1911; Melatoma subviridis (May, 1910)

= Splendrillia subviridis =

Species of gastropod

Splendrillia subviridis is a species of sea snail, a marine gastropod mollusk in the family Drilliidae.

== Description ==
The length of the shell attains 16 mm, its diameter 6 mm.

(Original description) The solid, subfusiform shell is greenish white. The interior of the aperture is dark green. The shell contains 7½ whorls, including a protoconch of two smooth rounded whorls. The sculpture consists of numerous strong, smooth, rounded ribs, which are not separated by any intermediate space, and which spring directly from the suture. There are about 15 of these ribs on the penultimate whorl. A deep groove or depression on the upper part of the whorl almost reduces the ribs to vanishing point, above which they reappear with a strong bend towards the left, and give the effect of a row of tubercles at the suture. There is one faint impressed line about the upper third of the body whorl, and a number on the base. The aperture is short and broad, widely open anteriorly, with scarcely any contraction for a siphonal canal. The outer lip is simple, rounded, with a deep notch at the suture. The columella is strongly arched. The lip is broadly expanded over the body whorl, developing a strong callosity where it curves round above the sinus. The operculum is ovate, with an apical nucleus.

It is nearly related to Splendrillia woodsi (Beddome, 1883), but is distinguished by the long straight ribs—not nodulous—and which continue to the suture, although bent by the sinus groove and by its stouter form and much larger size

== Distribution ==
This marine species is endemic to Australia and occurs off Tasmania and Victoria
