= Patrick Marshall =

New Zealand geologist, tennis player, and cricketer (1869–1950)

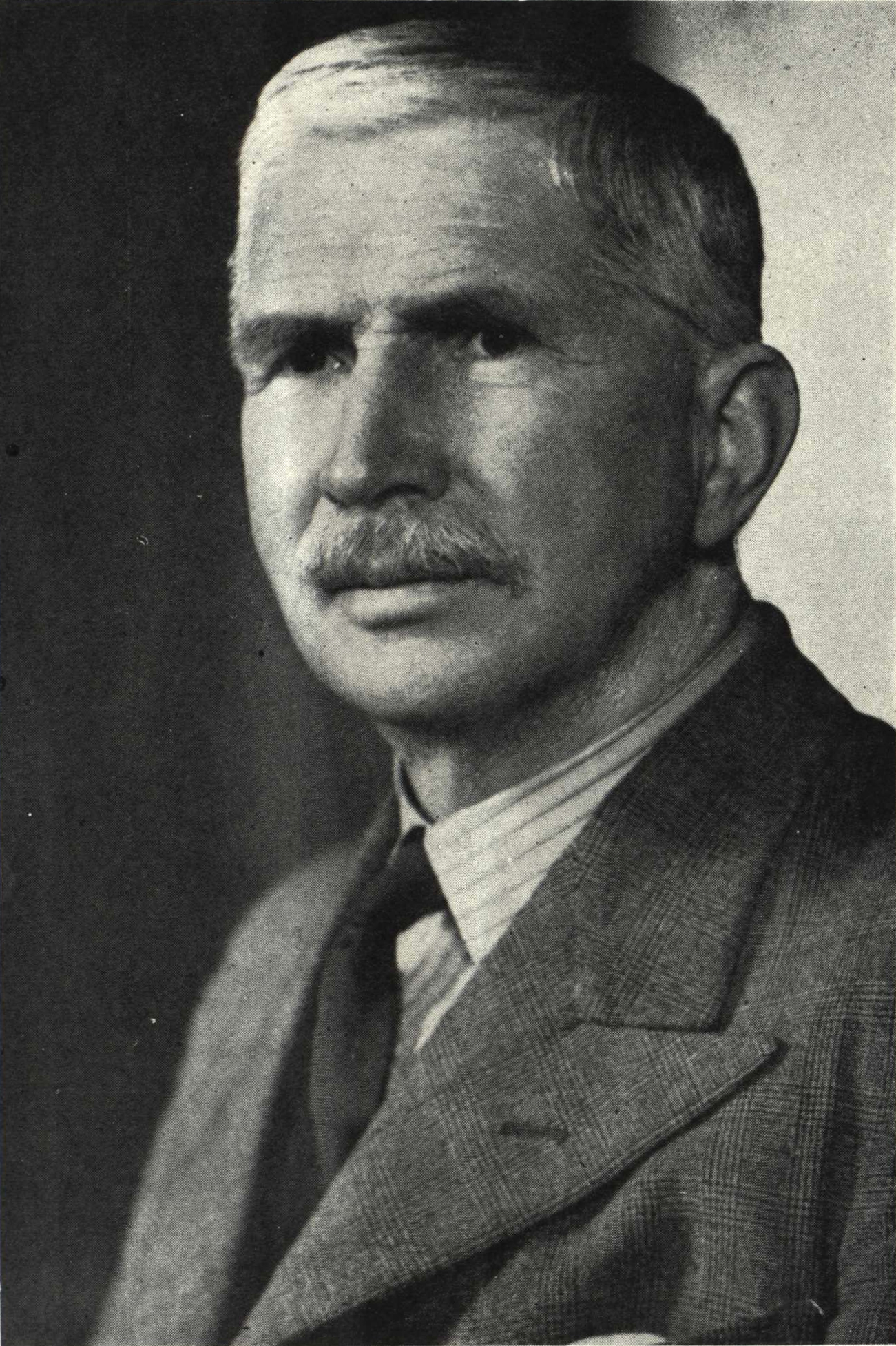
- Born: 22 December 1869; Sapiston, Suffolk, England
- Died: November 1950 (aged 81)
- Known for: Being the first to use the term "andesite line"
- Awards: Hector Memorial Medal (1915); Hutton Medal (1917)
- Scientific career
- Fields: Geology
- Workplaces: University of Canterbury; University of Otago

Patrick Marshall (22 December 1869 – November 1950) was a geologist who lived in New Zealand. He was the first to introduce the terms rodingite and ignimbrite into petrology and mineralogy. Marshall's most significant contribution to science was his work on coastal erosion and volcanology.

== Early life ==
Patrick Marshall was born on 22 December 1869 in Sapiston, Suffolk, to Emily Louisa Merielina Rogers and her husband, John Hannath Marshall, a cricketer and vicar of Sapiston. Due to John's failing health, the family emigrated to New Zealand in 1876 and settled in Kaiteretere. After John Marshall died in 1879, his widow and children returned to England, where Patrick attended school at Bury St Edmunds. His mother later remarried, and the family moved to Wanganui, New Zealand in 1882.

Marshall attended Wanganui Collegiate School from 1883 to 1888. He then studied geology and biology under Professor Frederick Hutton at Canterbury College, graduating with BA and BSc degrees in 1891 and receiving a Senior Scholarship in geology. In 1892 he studied for an MA at the University of Otago under Professor George Henry Frederick Ulrich.

== Career as an academic ==
From 1893 to 1895, Marshall was a lecturer in natural sciences at the Lincoln University in Christchurch, where he conducted research in entomology. He then spent five years as a senior science master at Auckland College and Grammar School. During this period, he completed a thesis on the Auckland volcanic field and was awarded a DSc in 1900. On 19 January 1900, he married Ruth Mary Dudley in Auckland.

In 1901, Marshall was appointed lecturer in geology at the University of Otago. He became professor of geology and mineralogy in 1908. At Otago, he conducted geologic research, joined the Philosophical Institute of Canterbury's 1907 expedition to the subantarctic islands, and contributed to two regional bulletins for the New Zealand Geological Survey. He also taught at the university and participated in wartime-related activities in Dunedin. When the First World War began in 1914, he volunteered for active service but was rejected.

== Sporting career ==
Marshall won the men's doubles at the New Zealand national tennis championships with his brother Joy in 1893–94. He played three first-class cricket matches for Auckland in the 1900–01 season.

== Bibliography ==
Articles by Patrick Marshall published in Transactions and Proceedings of the Royal Society of New Zealand:

- Marshall P. (1894). "Tridymite-Trachyte of Lyttelton". Transactions and Proceedings of the Royal Society of New Zealand 26: 368–387.
- (1895) "New Zealand Diptera: No. 1". 28
- (1895). "On Dodonidia helmsi, Fereday". 28'
- (1901) "On Leaf-beds in the Kaikorai Valley". 34
- (1902) "The Kingston Moraine".35
- (1903) "Boulders in Triassic Conglomerate, Nelson". 36
- (1904) "Magnesian Rocks at Milford Sound". 37
- (1905) "Geological Notes on the Country North-west of Lake Wakatipu". 38
- (1907) "Geology of Centre and North of North Island". 40
- (1907) "Note on the Gabbro of the Dun Mountain". 40: 320–322.
- (1908) "Geology of Rarotonga and Aitutaki". 41
- (1908) "Contact Rocks from West Nelson". 41
- (1908) "Crater of Ngauruhoe". 41
- (1908) "Additions to the List of New Zealand Minerals". 41
- (1908) "Some New Zealand Fossil Cephalopods". 41
- (1909) "Note on the Geology of Mangaia". 42
- (1909) "The Glaciation of New Zealand". 42
- Marshall P., Speight R. & Cotton C. A. (1910) "The Younger Rock-series of New Zealand". 43
- (1911) "Nephelinite Rocks in New Zealand". 44
- (1912) "Note on the Rate of Erosion of the Hooker and Mueller Glaciers". 45
- Marshall P. & Uttley G. H. (1912) "Some Localities for Fossils at Oamaru". 45: 297–307.
- (1913) "Notes on the Geology of Moorea and Rurutu Islands". 46
- (1913) "The Geology of the Cape Runaway District". 46
- Marshall P. & Uttley G. H. (1913) "Localities for Fossils near Oamaru". 46: 279–280.
- (1914) "The Geology of Tahiti". 47
- (1914) "Cainozoic Fossils from Oamaru". 47
- (1914) "The Recent Volcanic Eruptions on Ambrym Island". 47
- (1915) "The Younger Limestones of New Zealand". 48
- (1915) "Some New Fossil Gastropods". 48
- (1916) "Geology of the Central Kaipara". 49
- (1916) "The Wangaloa Beds". 49
- (1916) "Additional Fossils from Target Gully, near Oamaru". 49
- (1916) "Fossils and Age of the Hampden (Onekakara) Beds". 49
- Marshall P. (1918). "The Tertiary Molluscan Fauna of Pakaurangi Point. Kaipara Harbour". Transactions and Proceedings of the Royal Society of New Zealand 50: 263–278.
- (1918) "Notes on the Geology of the Tubuai Islands and of Pitcairn". 50
- (1919) "Fauna of the Hampden Beds and Classification of the Oamaru System". 51
- (1919) "Occurrence of Fossil Moa-bones in the Lower Wanganui Strata". 51
- Marshall P. & Murdoch R. (1919) "Some New Fossil Species of Mollusca". 51: 253–258.
- (1920) "The Tawhiti Series, East Cape District". 52
- (1920) "The Hampden Beds and the New Zealand Tertiary Limestones". 52
- Marshall P. & Murdoch R. (1920) "The Tertiary Rocks near Wanganui". 52
- Marshall P. & Murdoch R. (1921) "Tertiary Rocks near Hawera". 53
- Marshall P. & Murdoch R. (1921) "Some Tertiary Mollusca, with Descriptions of New Species". 53: 77–84
- Marshall P. (1923) "Early Tertiary Molluscan Faunas of New Zealand". 54
- Marshall P. & Murdoch R. (1923) "Some Tertiary Mollusca, with Descriptions of New Species". 54: 121–128
- Marshall P. & Murdoch R. (1923) "The Occurrence of the Genus Lahillia in New Zealand". 54
- (1924) "Two Fossil Cephalopods from North Canterbury". 55
- Marshall P. & Murdoch R. (1924) "The Tertiary Rocks of the Wanganui – South Taranaki Coast". 55
- (1926) "Presidential Address". 56
- (1926) "The Upper Cretaceous Ammonites of New Zealand". 56
- (1926) "A New Species of Osmundites from Kawhia, New Zealand". 56
- (1927) "The Origin of Lake Waikaremoana". 57
- (1928) "The Wearing of Beach Gravels". 58
- (1928) "A Kaipara Ammonite". 58
- (1928) "A Natrolite Tinguaite from Dunedin". 58
- (1928) "Colloid Substances formed by Abrasion". 59
- (1930) "Beach Gravels and Sands". 60
- (1935) "Acid Rocks of the Taupo-Rotorua Volcanic District". 64
- (1937) "The Mineral Tuhualite." 66
- (1937) "Geology of Mayor Island." 66

Books:

- Marshall P., Gregory J. W., Hamilton A. & Hogben G. (1905). The geography of New Zealand. Historical, physical, political, and commercial. Christchurch, Whitcombe and Tombs limited. 447 pp.
- Marshall P. (1912). New Zealand and adjacent islands. Heidelberg. 79 pp.

== Species described ==
The World Register of Marine Species lists 38 marine species described by P. Marshall. Most of these are extinct.

- some Diptera
- † Conus abruptus Marshall, 1918
- † Paracomitas protransenna P. Marshall & R. Murdoch, 1923

== See also ==
- List of Auckland representative cricketers
