= Paracomitas gemmea =

Scientific classification
- Kingdom: Animalia
- Phylum: Mollusca
- Class: Gastropoda
- Subclass: Caenogastropoda
- Order: Neogastropoda
- Superfamily: Conoidea
- Family: Pseudomelatomidae
- Genus: Paracomitas
- Species: P. gemmea

Binomial name
- Paracomitas gemmea (R. Murdoch, 1900)

Synonyms
- † Pleurotoma gemmea R. Murdoch, 1900; † Surcula castlecliffensis (P. Marshall & R. Murdoch, 1919)

Extinct species of gastropod

Paracomitas gemmea is an extinct species of sea snail, a marine gastropod mollusk in the family Pseudomelatomidae, the turrids and allies.

== Distribution ==
This extinct marine species is endemic to New Zealand.
