= Conus pseudoarmoricus =

Conservation status
- Extinct (IUCN 3.1)

Scientific classification
- Kingdom: Animalia
- Phylum: Mollusca
- Class: Gastropoda
- Subclass: Caenogastropoda
- Order: Neogastropoda
- Superfamily: Conoidea
- Family: Conidae
- Genus: Conus
- Species: †C. pseudoarmoricus

Binomial name
- †Conus pseudoarmoricus P. Marshall & R. Murdoch, 1920

Species of sea snail

Conus pseudoarmoricus is an extinct species of sea snail, a marine gastropod mollusk in the family Conidae, the cone snails, cone shells or cones.

== Distribution ==
This marine species was found as a fossil in New Zealand.
