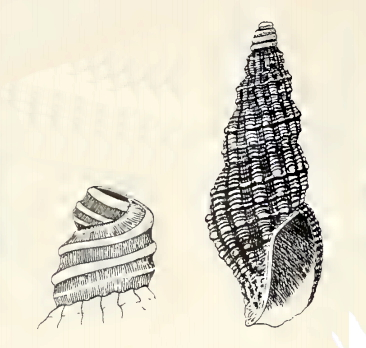
- Original image of a shell (and its protoconch) of Liracraea epentroma

Scientific classification
- Kingdom: Animalia
- Phylum: Mollusca
- Class: Gastropoda
- Subclass: Caenogastropoda
- Order: Neogastropoda
- Superfamily: Conoidea
- Family: Mangeliidae
- Genus: Liracraea
- Species: L. epentroma

Binomial name
- Liracraea epentroma (Murdoch, 1905)

Synonyms
- Clathurella epentroma Murdoch, 1905 (original combination); Liracraea epentroma epentroma (Murdoch, 1905) · accepted, alternate representation

= Liracraea epentroma =

Species of gastropod

Liracraea epentroma is a species of sea snail, a marine gastropod mollusk in the family Mangeliidae.

Subspecies

- Liracraea epentroma subantarctica Powell, 1942 (synonym : Liracraea subantarctica A.W.B. Powell, 1942)
- Liracraea epentroma whangaroaensis (Murdoch, 1905)

== Description ==
The length of the shell attains 6 mm, its diameter 2 mm.

(Original description) The small shell has a narrowly fusiform shape and a slender spire. Its colour is light reddish-brown or dull- chestnut. It contains 5½ whorls, rounded or obscurely angled above the periphery, adorned with fine spiral and longitudinal sculpture. The latter is strongest. The sutures are deep. The protoconch consists of about 1½ whorls, strongly angled, and with four smooth narrow revolving riblets, the posterior minute and situated near to the suture. The apical half-turn is obliquely curved down and somewhat imbedded in the succeeding whorl. The body whorl rather longer than the spire.

Adult sculpture : The longitudinals number fifteen to sixteen small riblets on the body whorl, equal to or rather wider than the interspaces, and usually less developed on the anterior end. They are continuous in some, irregular in others. The spirals consist of undulating delicate riblets and threads. On the spire-whorls there are two, and on the last seven or eight slightly stronger. Of these the four posterior are more widely spaced, two are above the outer lip and one in line with it. They are frequently forming beads on crossing the longitudinals. Within these spaces there are, on that adjoining the suture, four or five threadlets, sometime irregular in size. On the succeeding three spaces, usually three threadlets in each, the median one frequently strongest. Anterior to this the interspaces contain one to three threads. The old beaks sometimes forms short irregular riblets. The aperture is of medium breadth, less than half its length. The outer lip is simple. The posterior sinus is shallow. The columella is lightly curved. The anterior canal is short and broad.

The spirals on the anterior portion of the body whorl are somewhat variable in number and strength. The lightly angular appearance of the spire whorls in some individuals is due to the more prominent spirals being rather more pronounced. The spaces on these whorls are similarly adorned to the posterior portion of the last.

== Distribution ==
This species is endemic to New Zealand occurs from Cook Strait to Stewart Island.

== Taxonomy ==
This species was first described by Robert C. Murdoch in 1905 and originally named Clathurella epentroma.
