= Odostomia vestalis =

Scientific classification
- Kingdom: Animalia
- Phylum: Mollusca
- Class: Gastropoda
- Family: Pyramidellidae
- Genus: Odostomia
- Species: O. vestalis

Binomial name
- Odostomia vestalis Murdoch, 1905

Species of gastropod

Odostomia vestalis is a species of sea snail, a marine gastropod mollusk in the family Pyramidellidae, the pyrams and their allies.
