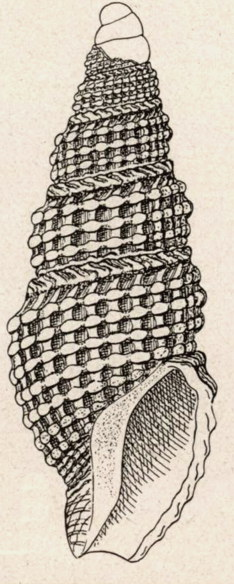
- Original drawing of a shell of Awateria optabilis

Scientific classification
- Kingdom: Animalia
- Phylum: Mollusca
- Class: Gastropoda
- Subclass: Caenogastropoda
- Order: Neogastropoda
- Superfamily: Conoidea
- Family: Borsoniidae
- Genus: Awateria
- Species: A. optabilis

Binomial name
- Awateria optabilis (R. Murdoch & Suter, 1906)

Synonyms
- Drillia optabilis Murdoch & Suter, 1906 (original combination); Vexitomina optabilis (Murdoch & Suter, 1906)

= Awateria optabilis =

Species of mollusk

Awateria optabilis is a species of sea snail, a marine gastropod mollusk in the family Borsoniidae.

== Description ==
The length of the shell attains 10.7 mm, its breadth 3.9 mm.

(Original description) The small, narrow shell has a turriculate shape with an angle of spire, about 22°. The body whorl is shorter than the spire. The shell is clathrate. The aperture is pyriform. The canal is short.

Sculpture: The spire-whorls contain three spiral equidistant cords, which are crossed by longitudinal also equidistant threads, forming small beads at the intersections, and squarish interstitial depressions. There are about twenty-one beads on a row. On approaching the base the spirals are getting narrower than the interspace, and the beading less prominent. Upon the beak there are small irregular threads crossed obliquely by the plications of the old beaks.

The colour of the shell is greyish-white.

The spire is turriculate, not very conspicuously shouldered, longer than the body whorl. Protoconch: The outer shelly layer has scaled off and it is impossible to give a description. The nucleus is globular and obliquely tilted. The seven whorls are narrowly angled and excavated above, their sides almost straight. The base of the shell is convex and narrowed to a short and anteriorly sinuated beak. The suture is bimarginate, above by a minute threadlet, below by a broad and heavy cord which is obliquely irregularly plicated. The aperture is pyriform, angled above, with a concave inner wall, ending in a short broad canal, which turns slightly to the left. The outer lip is curved and imperfect The lines of growth would indicate that the sinus is situate in the excavation below the sutural cord, that it is small and moderately deep. The inner lip spread as a thin layer narrowly over the body, broader over the columella, which is first straight and then slightly twisted to the left, ending in a sharp point.

== Distribution ==
This marine species is endemic to New Zealand at the North Island at a depth of 1280 m.
