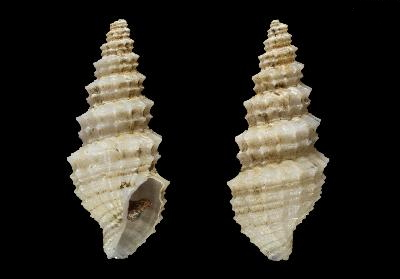
- Shell of Mioawateria ektonos (holotype in MNHN, Paris)

Scientific classification
- Kingdom: Animalia
- Phylum: Mollusca
- Class: Gastropoda
- Subclass: Caenogastropoda
- Order: Neogastropoda
- Superfamily: Conoidea
- Family: Raphitomidae
- Genus: Mioawateria
- Species: M. ektonos

Binomial name
- Mioawateria ektonos Morassi & Bonfitto, 2010

= Mioawateria ektonos =

Species of gastropod

Mioawateria ektonos is a species of sea snail in the family Raphitomidae.

== Description ==
The holotype, the largest specimen in the type series, measures 11.8 mm × 4.6 mm (0.46 in × 0.18 in) (height times width); its aperture height is 5.6 mm (0.22 in). It has a usual, prickly teleoconch sculpture.

== Distribution ==
The type series of this marine species was collected in the Solomon Islands at depths of 283–305 m (928–1,001 ft).
