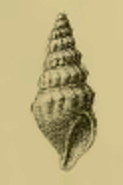
- Original drawing of a shell of Awateria hoylei

Scientific classification
- Kingdom: Animalia
- Phylum: Mollusca
- Class: Gastropoda
- Subclass: Caenogastropoda
- Order: Neogastropoda
- Superfamily: Conoidea
- Family: Borsoniidae
- Genus: Awateria
- Species: A. hoylei

Binomial name
- Awateria hoylei (E. A. Smith, 1891)

Synonyms
- Pleurotoma (Drillia) hoylei E. A. Smith, 1891 (original combination)

= Awateria hoylei =

Species of gastropod

Awateria hoylei is a species of sea snail, a marine gastropod mollusk in the family Borsoniidae.

== Description ==
The length of the shell attains 9 mm, its breadth 3.5 mm.

(Original description) The small, white shell has a fusiform shape. It contains eight whorls.with the top ones obliquely concave, the middle ones obtusely angulated and narrowing within the angle and barely convex. The riblets are obliquely zigzag, especially at the corners (disappearing gradually above and below). The aperture is small. The anal sinus is of mediocre depth.

The costae in this species are very short, and soon become obsolete above and below the angle, so that they appear like a series of oblique nodules. The absence of spiral sculpture is peculiar.

== Distribution ==
This marine species is endemic to Australia.
