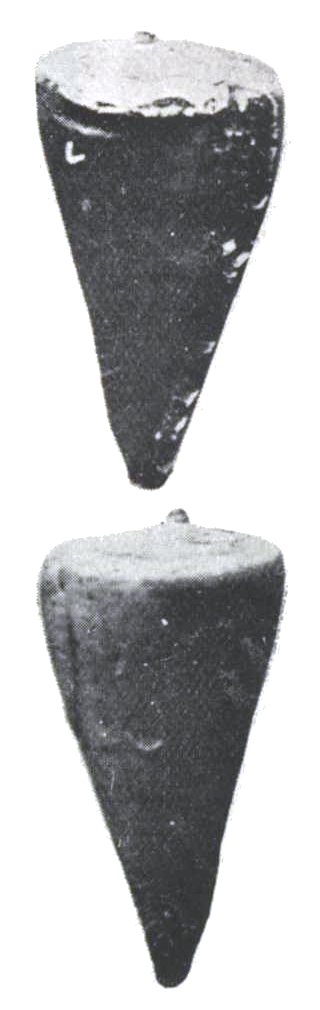
- Apertural (upper) and abapertural view of the fossil shell of Conus abruptus from its original description.

Scientific classification
- Domain: Eukaryota
- Kingdom: Animalia
- Phylum: Mollusca
- Class: Gastropoda
- Subclass: Caenogastropoda
- Order: Neogastropoda
- Superfamily: Conoidea
- Family: Conidae
- Genus: Conus
- Species: C. abruptus

Binomial name
- Conus abruptus Marshall, 1918.

Synonyms
- Conus (Lithoconus) abruptus Marshall, 1918

= Conus abruptus =

Conus abruptus Temporal range: Tertiary

Species of sea snail

Conus abruptus is an extinct species of sea snail, a marine gastropod mollusk in the family Conidae, the cone snails and their allies.

== Description ==
Conus abruptus was originally discovered and described by New Zealand geologist Patrick Marshall in 1918.

Marshall's type description reads as follows:

Conus (Lithoconus) abruptus. n. sp. (Plate XX, figs. 7, 7a.)

Shell of moderate size, conical, 20 mm by 11 mm. Spire of 5 whorls, almost flat, and from it the protoconch of 3 whorls projects sharply. Aperture narrow. Columella with a spiral groove near its anterior end. Ornamentation: The whorls of the spire each with about 5 spiral lirae crossed by numerous growth-lines. Suture moderately deep. Body-whorl with numerous but indistinct growth-lines. Eleven distinct spiral lirae near the anterior end. Otherwise the surface is quite smooth.

One specimen, in good condition. This subgenus has not previously been recorded from New Zealand. Type in the Wanganui Museum.

== Distribution ==
Pakaurangi Point, Kaipara Harbour, New Zealand, during the Tertiary.
