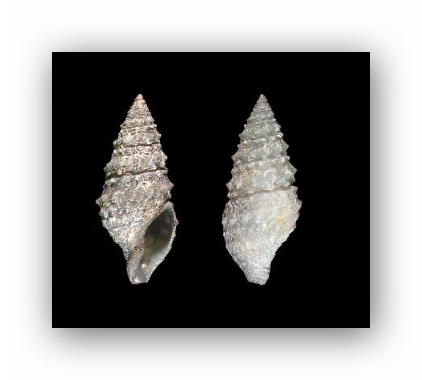
- Acanthodaphne pungens from the Solomon Islands

Scientific classification
- Kingdom: Animalia
- Phylum: Mollusca
- Class: Gastropoda
- Subclass: Caenogastropoda
- Order: Neogastropoda
- Superfamily: Conoidea
- Family: Raphitomidae
- Genus: Acanthodaphne; Bonfitto & Morassi, 2006

Type species
- Acanthodaphne sabellii Bonfitto & Morassi, 2006

Species
- 6 species (see text)

= Acanthodaphne =

Genus of gastropods

Acanthodaphne is a genus of sea snails in the family Raphitomidae. They are small gastropods, maximally 12.2 mm (0.48 in) long. The extant species are known from depths between 194 and 1,400 m (636 and 4,593 ft).

== Species ==
Species within the genus Acanthodaphne include:

- Acanthodaphne abbreviata (Schepman, 1913)
- Acanthodaphne basicincta Morassi & Bonfitto, 2010
- Acanthodaphne boucheti Morassi & Bonfitto, 2010
- Acanthodaphne pungens Morassi & Bonfitto, 2010
- † Acanthodaphne pusula (Laws, 1947)
- Acanthodaphne sabellii Bonfitto & Morassi, 2006
