= Awheaturris echinata =

Scientific classification
- Kingdom: Animalia
- Phylum: Mollusca
- Class: Gastropoda
- Subclass: Caenogastropoda
- Order: Neogastropoda
- Superfamily: Conoidea
- Family: Raphitomidae
- Genus: Awheaturris
- Species: A. echinata

Binomial name
- Awheaturris echinata Beu, 1970

Extinct species of gastropod

Awheaturris echinata is an extinct species of sea snail, a marine gastropod mollusk in the family Raphitomidae.

== Distribution ==
Fossils of this marine species were found in Miocene strata in New Zealand; age range: 11.608 to 5.332 Ma.
