= Liracraea opimacosta =

Scientific classification
- Kingdom: Animalia
- Phylum: Mollusca
- Class: Gastropoda
- Subclass: Caenogastropoda
- Order: Neogastropoda
- Superfamily: Conoidea
- Family: Mangeliidae
- Genus: Liracraea
- Species: L. opimacosta

Binomial name
- Liracraea opimacosta Richardson, 1997

Extinct species of gastropod

Liracraea opimacosta is an extinct species of sea snail, a marine gastropod mollusk in the family Mangeliidae.

== Distribution ==
This extinct species is endemic to New Zealand.
