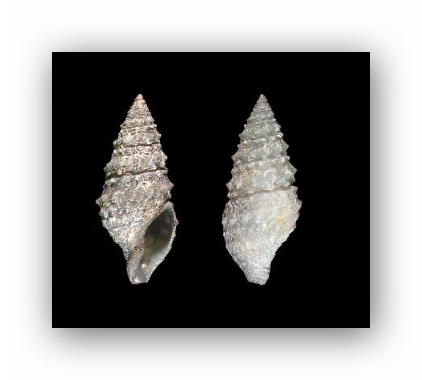
- Original image of a shell of Acanthodaphne pungens (holotype in MNHN, Paris)

Scientific classification
- Kingdom: Animalia
- Phylum: Mollusca
- Class: Gastropoda
- Subclass: Caenogastropoda
- Order: Neogastropoda
- Superfamily: Conoidea
- Family: Raphitomidae
- Genus: Acanthodaphne
- Species: A. pungens

Binomial name
- Acanthodaphne pungens Morassi & Bonfitto, 2010

= Acanthodaphne pungens =

Species of gastropod

Acanthodaphne pungens is a species of sea snail, a marine gastropod mollusk in the family Raphitomidae.

== Description ==
The length of the shell attains 7 mm.

== Distribution ==
This species occurs in the Pacific Ocean off the Solomon Islands; also off Papua New Guinea.
