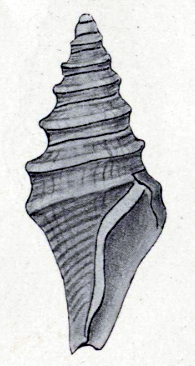
- Original image of a shell of Paracomitas protransenna

Scientific classification
- Kingdom: Animalia
- Phylum: Mollusca
- Class: Gastropoda
- Subclass: Caenogastropoda
- Order: Neogastropoda
- Superfamily: Conoidea
- Family: Pseudomelatomidae
- Genus: Paracomitas
- Species: P. protransenna

Binomial name
- Paracomitas protransenna (P. Marshall & R. Murdoch, 1923)

Synonyms
- † Surcula protransenna P. Marshall & Murdoch, 1923

= Paracomitas protransenna =

Extinct species of gastropod

Paracomitas protransenna is an extinct species of sea snail, a marine gastropod mollusk in the family Pseudomelatomidae, the turrids and allies.

== Description ==
The length of the shell attains 13 mm, its diameter 5 mm.

(Original description) The small shell is narrowly fusiform. The spire is turreted. The shell contains seven or eight whorls. It shows a strongly projecting rounded keel at middle on the spire-whorls, concave above and below, on the body whorl a well-marked concave area below keel followed by a second keel less pronounced, anterior to this rather abruptly contracted. The aperture and siphonal canal are slightly longer than the spire. The protoconch consists of about 1½ smooth whorls, the lower distinctly carinate, apex blunt. The sutures are linear, margined above and below, variable, some examples indistinct. Sculpture—spirals con sist of numerous fine lines on the keel and above and below it, indistinct in some specimens, on the body whorl usually more pronounced. The axials consist of growth lines only, variable in strength, arcuate between the keel and suture above. The aperture is small, ovate and produced into a long siphonal canal. The outer lip is angled at the keel, thence concave followed by a convexity, and beneath this rapidly narrowing to the siphonal canal. The columella is narrowly callused, straight in the middle portion, narrowing and slightly twisted to the left.

== Distribution ==
This extinct marine species is endemic to New Zealand.
