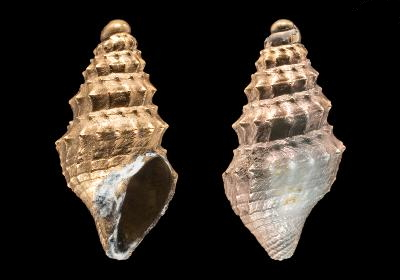
- Shell of Awheaturris lozoueti (holotype at MNHN, Paris)

Scientific classification
- Kingdom: Animalia
- Phylum: Mollusca
- Class: Gastropoda
- Subclass: Caenogastropoda
- Order: Neogastropoda
- Superfamily: Conoidea
- Family: Raphitomidae
- Genus: Awheaturris; Beu, 1970

Type species
- † Awheaturris echinata Beu, 1970

Species
- See text

= Awheaturris =

Genus of gastropods

Awheaturris is a genus of sea snails, marine gastropod mollusks in the family Raphitomidae.

== Description ==
These species were only known from fossils in Miocene strata in the Indo-Pacific area, until Morassi & Bonfitto found a Recent species off the Philippines.

== Species ==
Species within the genus Awheaturris include:

- † Awheaturris echinata Beu, 1970
- † Awheaturris experta (Laws, 1947)
- Awheaturris lozoueti Morassi & Bonfitto, 2013
- † Awheaturris pahaoensis Vella, 1954
- † Awheaturris quisquilia (Philippi, 1887)
