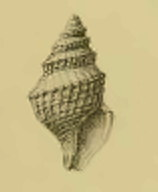
- Original drawing of a shell of Awateria watsoni

Scientific classification
- Kingdom: Animalia
- Phylum: Mollusca
- Class: Gastropoda
- Subclass: Caenogastropoda
- Order: Neogastropoda
- Superfamily: Conoidea
- Family: Borsoniidae
- Genus: Awateria
- Species: A. watsoni

Binomial name
- Awateria watsoni (E. A. Smith, 1891)

Synonyms
- Pleurotoma (Drillia) watsoni E. A. Smith, 1891 (original combination)

= Awateria watsoni =

Species of gastropod

Awateria watsoni is a species of sea snail, a marine gastropod mollusk in the family Borsoniidae.

== Description ==
The length of the shell attains 6.5 mm, its breadth 3.3 mm.

(Original description) This small, white shell has a short fusiform shape. It has a large smooth apex. The upper slope of the six whorls is comparatively smooth, exhibiting only a few (about 4) faint spiral lirae, and the lower portion and the greater part of the body whorl are covered with a distinct cancellation, the points of intersection of the oblique and transverse lirae being rather acutely nodulose. The sinus is moderately deep. The arcuate lip is prominent.

== Distribution ==
This marine species is endemic to Australia.
