= Awateria retiolata =

Scientific classification
- Kingdom: Animalia
- Phylum: Mollusca
- Class: Gastropoda
- Subclass: Caenogastropoda
- Order: Neogastropoda
- Superfamily: Conoidea
- Family: Borsoniidae
- Genus: Awateria
- Species: A. retiolata

Binomial name
- Awateria retiolata L. C. King, 1933

Synonyms
- † Awateria mollyae L. C. King, 1933

Extinct species of gastropod

Awateria retiolata is an extinct species of sea snail, a marine gastropod mollusk in the family Borsoniidae.

== Description ==
The length of the shell attains 10 mm, the width 4.5 mm. The spire is high, 1 1/2 times the height of the aperture. The shell has 4 1/2 whorls. The small, thin shel lhas a turreted shape. The protoconch is worn. The sculpture consists of, on the spire-whorls, of axial ribs reaching from the shoulder to the suture. The shell is inclined steeply to the left. The interspaces have the same width as the ribs. The whorls of the spire contain four spiral cords, the upper two the stronger, cross the axials below the shoulder, giving a reticulate sculpture to the spire. The shoulder is smooth and concave. The body whorl has spiral sculpture only. The uppermost spiral cord on the shoulder angle is faintly nodulous on the earlier part of the body-whorl as a last suggestion of the previous axial sculpture. Weak growth-lines cover most of the shell, being rather more prominent on the smooth shoulder. The aperture is subquadrate, strongly channelled below and with a light sinus above. The columella is vertical, bent to the left below. The outer lip thin, the inner lip is well defined.

== Distribution ==
This extinct marine species is endemic to New Zealand..
