= Acanthodaphne sabellii =

Scientific classification
- Kingdom: Animalia
- Phylum: Mollusca
- Class: Gastropoda
- Subclass: Caenogastropoda
- Order: Neogastropoda
- Superfamily: Conoidea
- Family: Raphitomidae
- Genus: Acanthodaphne
- Species: A. sabellii

Binomial name
- Acanthodaphne sabellii Morassi & Bonfitto, 2006

Species of gastropod

Acanthodaphne sabellii is a species of sea snail, a marine gastropod mollusk in the family Raphitomidae.

== Description ==
The length of the shell attains 6.6 mm.

== Distribution ==
This species occurs in the Gulf of Aden.
