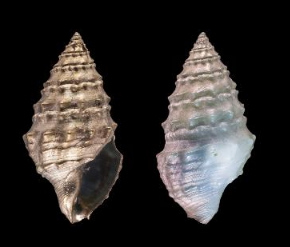
- Original image of a shell of Acanthodaphne basicincta

Scientific classification
- Kingdom: Animalia
- Phylum: Mollusca
- Class: Gastropoda
- Subclass: Caenogastropoda
- Order: Neogastropoda
- Superfamily: Conoidea
- Family: Raphitomidae
- Genus: Acanthodaphne
- Species: A. basicincta

Binomial name
- Acanthodaphne basicincta Morassi & Bonfitto, 2010

= Acanthodaphne basicincta =

Species of gastropod

Acanthodaphne basicincta is a species of sea snail, a marine gastropod mollusk in the family Raphitomidae.

== Description ==
The length of the shell attains 7 mm. The teleoconch consists of 5.8 whorls, which are sharply angulated at one-quarter of whorl height on earlier spire whorls. The last whorl is strongly excavated with a short neck. The whorls are separated by a weakly impressed, strongly undulating suture margined by a prominent subsutural fold. The sutural ramp is wide, and strongly concave. The axial sculpture consists of short, prominent, opisthocline ribs, separated by interspaces much wider than them, extending from the lower suture to the shoulder angle where they are abruptly truncated and form sharp tubercles. Axial ribs rapidly vanishes on last whorl below periphery. There are 11-13 axial ribs on the penultimate whorl and 13–16 on the last whorl. The subsutural fold bears a row of tubercles more numerous than the axial ribs. The sutural ramp is sculptured by fine collabral threads sinuous in conformity with the anal sinus. The spiral sculpture consists of narrow, flattened cords. Earlier spire whorls with one peripheral cord forms a peripheral angulation, joined on the penultimate whorl by a weaker cord anteriorly. interstice between these two cords are sculptured by 1-2 very low threads. The last whorl with a third cord just below the suture and a fourth prominent peribasal cord bears tubercles. Interstices between the spiral cords are sculptured by 2-4 threads. The remaining part of the is base sculptured by 2-3 widely spaced low cords lacking intermediaries with 8-10 threads on the neck. The aperture is oblanceolate. Columella concave above, strongly twisted to left below forming a short, relatively narrow siphonal canal. The labial callus is relatively thick over columella, sculptured by microscopic rows of prickly nodules in its interior part. The parietal region is rendered angular by the peribasal cord. The outer lip is thin with a moderately deep, reversed L-shaped anal sinus. The protoconch is conical with 3.25 whorls; covered with minute, dense spiral threads rendered granulose when crossed by even finer axial threads with the subsequent part sculptured by opisthocyrt axial riblets extending from suture to suture on lower half of each whorl. The protoconch diameter is 0.57-0.67 mm. The protoconch color is yellowish-beige while the shell color is white.

== Distribution ==
This species occurs in the Pacific Ocean off the Solomon Islands; also off Papua New Guinea.
