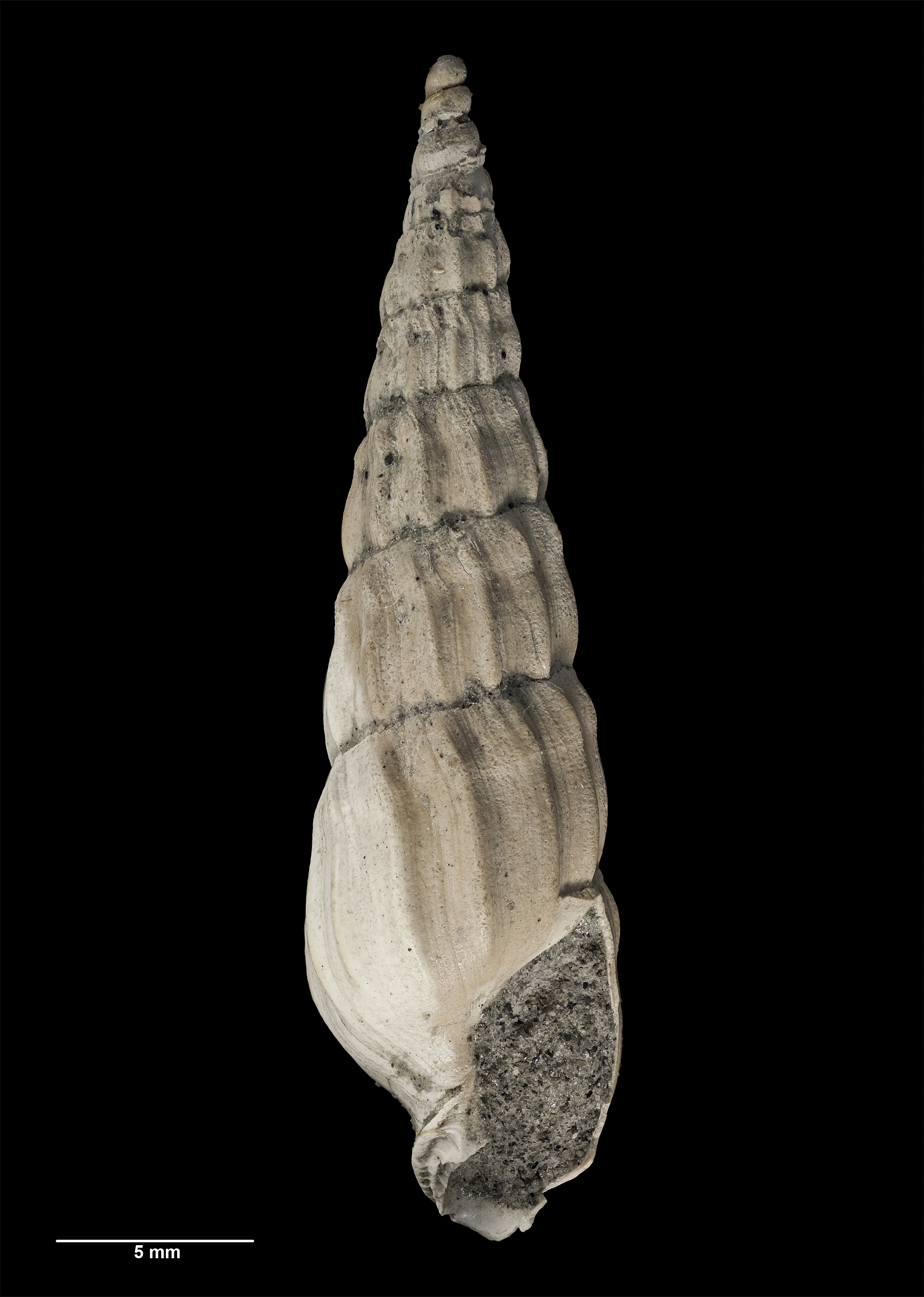
- Holotype from Auckland War Memorial Museum

Scientific classification
- Kingdom: Animalia
- Phylum: Mollusca
- Class: Gastropoda
- Subclass: Caenogastropoda
- Order: Neogastropoda
- Family: Terebridae
- Genus: †Zeacuminia
- Species: †Z. murdochi

Binomial name
- †Zeacuminia murdochi A. W. B. Powell, 1931

= Zeacuminia murdochi =

Zeacuminia murdochi Temporal range: late Pliocene

Extinct species of gastropod

Zeacuminia murdochi is an extinct species of sea snail, a marine gastropod mollusc in the family Pseudotomidae. Fossils of the species date to late Pliocene strata of the Tangahoe Formation in New Zealand.

== Description ==
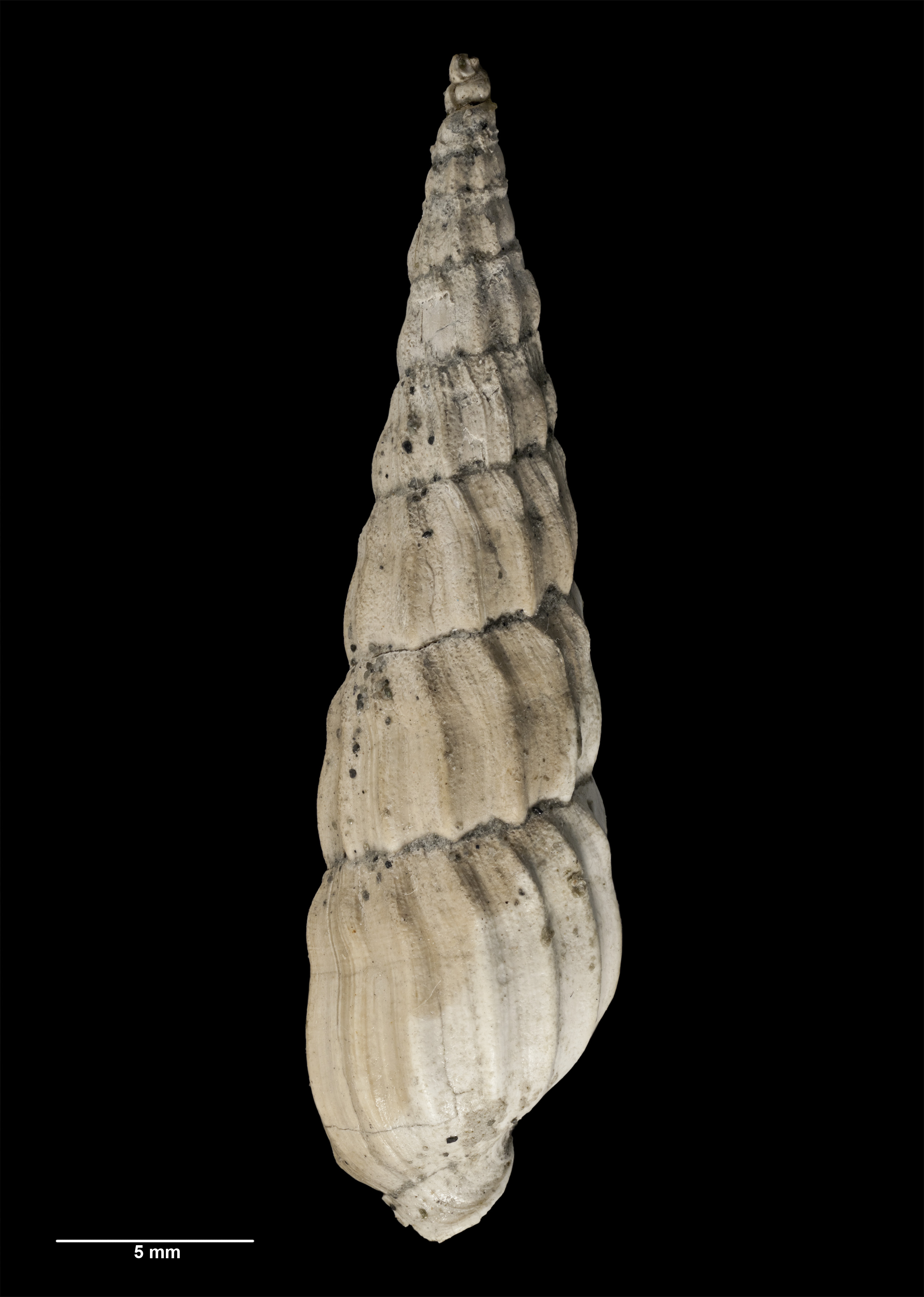
Reverse view of holotype

In the original description, Powell described the species as follows:

Shell moderately large, attenuated. Spire two and one-fifth times height of aperture, plus canal. Outline of whorls flatly-convex, with a slight constriction towards the upper third of the height of the spire whorls. The protoconch is imperfect in the two available specimens, but the holotype exhibited a perfect polygyrate apex prior to becoming damaged while being worked from the matrix. Whorls estimated at about 12, including protoconch. Sculpture of strong, widely spaced axial costae (12 on the penultimate), which are rendered slightly sinuous by the subsutural spiral constriction. In addition, there is secondary sculpture of indistinct irregularly developed axial growth folds, varying from three to five per intercostal space. On the body-whorl the costae rapidly diminish below the rounded periphery, and become obsolete on the base. The base is deeply contracted towards the fasciole and the canal is short, obliquely twisted, terminating in a broad arcuate sinus. Fasciole well developed, bordered above by a prominently raised rib, which issues from within the aperture and traverses the inner lip.

The holotype of the species has an estimated height of 31.25 mm (1.230 in), and a diameter of 8.25 mm (0.325 in). It can be distinguished from other members of Zeacuminia due to its strong, widely spaced obsolescent axials.

== Taxonomy ==
The species was first described by A. W. B. Powell in 1931, who named the species after paleontologist Robert C. Murdoch. The holotype was collected in January 1931 from near the mouth of Waihi Stream near Hāwera, Taranaki, and is held in the collections of Auckland War Memorial Museum.

== Distribution ==
This extinct marine species occurs in late Pliocene (Waipipian) strata of the Tangahoe Formation, primarily associated with the Taranaki and Manawatū–Whanganui regions of New Zealand. Fossils of the species have been found near Hāwera and Waverley, South Taranaki, and on a section of the Manawatū River near Woodville, Tararua District.
