= Liracraea titirangiensis =

Scientific classification
- Kingdom: Animalia
- Phylum: Mollusca
- Class: Gastropoda
- Subclass: Caenogastropoda
- Order: Neogastropoda
- Superfamily: Conoidea
- Family: Mangeliidae
- Genus: Liracraea
- Species: †L. titirangiensis

Binomial name
- †Liracraea titirangiensis J. Marwick, 1928

Extinct species of gastropod

Liracraea titirangiensis is an extinct species of sea snail, a marine gastropod mollusk in the family Mangeliidae.

== Description ==
The length of the shell attains 4.2 mm (0.17 in), its diameter is 2 mm (0.079 in).

== Distribution ==
This extinct species is endemic to New Zealand and fossils were found off the Chatham Islands.
