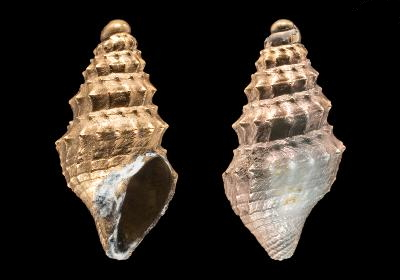
- Shell of Awheaturris lozoueti (holotype at MNHN, Paris)

Scientific classification
- Kingdom: Animalia
- Phylum: Mollusca
- Class: Gastropoda
- Subclass: Caenogastropoda
- Order: Neogastropoda
- Superfamily: Conoidea
- Family: Raphitomidae
- Genus: Awheaturris
- Species: A. lozoueti

Binomial name
- Awheaturris lozoueti Morassi & Bonfitto, 2013

= Awheaturris lozoueti =

Species of sea snail

Awheaturris lozoueti is a species of sea snail, a marine gastropod mollusk in the family Raphitomidae.

== Description ==
The length of the shell attains 5.8 mm.

== Distribution ==
This marine species occurs off the Philippines.
