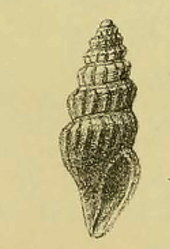
- Original drawing of a shell of Awateria crossei

Scientific classification
- Kingdom: Animalia
- Phylum: Mollusca
- Class: Gastropoda
- Subclass: Caenogastropoda
- Order: Neogastropoda
- Superfamily: Conoidea
- Family: Borsoniidae
- Genus: Awateria
- Species: A. crossei

Binomial name
- Awateria crossei (E. A. Smith, 1891)

Synonyms
- Pleurotoma (Drillia) crossei E. A. Smith, 1891 (original combination)

= Awateria crossei =

Species of gastropod

Awateria crossei is a species of sea snail, a marine gastropod mollusk in the family Borsoniidae.

== Description ==
The length of the shell attains 10 mm, its breadth 3.75 mm. (Original description) The small, white shell has a fusiform shape. It contains seven whorls. The top ones are left-handed and convex, the others slightly concave above the rest, with rounded angles. It contains about 15 diagonal riblets that are less attenuated in the last whorls. The aperture is small. The angle on top of the lip is not deeply sinuated.

This species has the whorls much contracted at the lower part and prominent at the rounded angle. The riblets are oblique below, and flexuous in the concavity. The spiral lirae are more conspicuous around the lower part of the body whorl than elsewhere, and altogether absent in the concavity below the sutural line.

== Distribution ==
This marine species is endemic to Australia.
