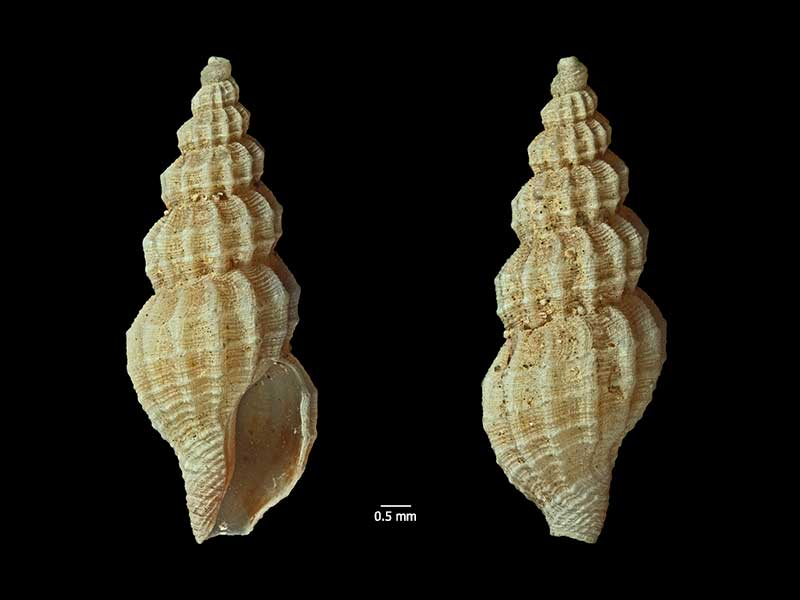
- Liracraea odhneri in Tryphena Bay, Great Barrier Island, Hauraki Gulf, NZ. Collection of Auckland Museum.

Scientific classification
- Kingdom: Animalia
- Phylum: Mollusca
- Class: Gastropoda
- Subclass: Caenogastropoda
- Order: Neogastropoda
- Superfamily: Conoidea
- Family: Mangeliidae
- Genus: Liracraea
- Species: L. odhneri

Binomial name
- Liracraea odhneri Powell, 1942

Synonyms
- Liracraea odhneri odhneri Powell, 1942 · accepted, alternate representation

= Liracraea odhneri =

Species of gastropod

Liracraea odhneri is a species of sea snail, a marine gastropod mollusk in the family Mangeliidae.

There is one subspecies: Liracraea odhneri benthicola Dell, 1956

== Description ==
This snail shell is small to medium-sized (3–30 mm, typically 6–12 mm), oval to fusiform, with a low spire and often a shoulder angulation. It features well-developed spiral and axial sculpture, with microsculpture of spirally aligned granules. The subsutural ramp is not sculpturally separated, and the anal sinus is shallow to deep. The aperture is simple, without strong outgrowths, and the siphon is short to moderately long. The protoconch is multispiral, with up to five whorls, and may have axial ribbing and spiral cords. An operculum is present in some species but often absent.

== Distribution ==
This species is endemic to New Zealand occurs off North Island, upper South Island and Chatham Islands.
