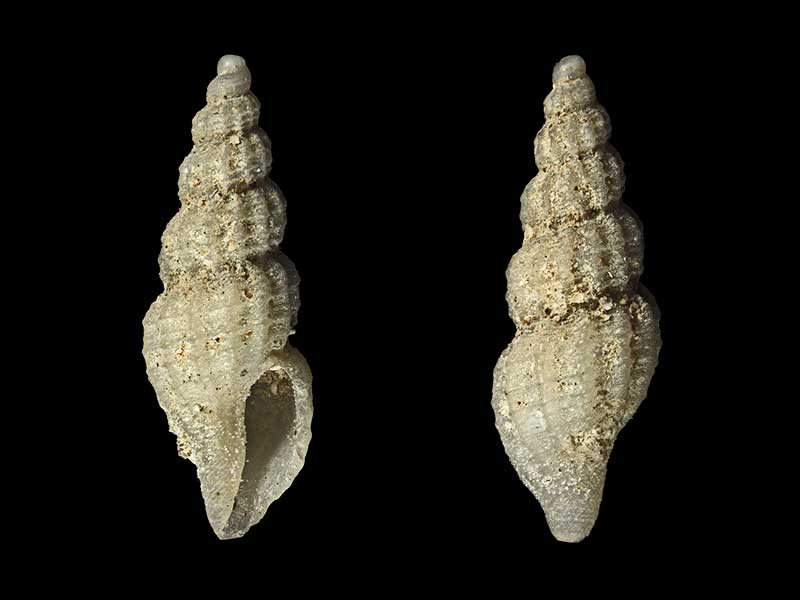
- Holotype, collected in 110 metres, off Taiaroa Head, Otago, NZ (MA71011). © Auckland Museum (CC-BY)

Scientific classification
- Kingdom: Animalia
- Phylum: Mollusca
- Class: Gastropoda
- Subclass: Caenogastropoda
- Order: Neogastropoda
- Superfamily: Conoidea
- Family: Mangeliidae
- Genus: Liracraea
- Species: L. otakauica

Binomial name
- Liracraea otakauica Powell, 1942

= Liracraea otakauica =

Species of sea snail

Liracraea otakauica is a species of sea snail, a marine gastropod mollusk in the family Mangeliidae.

There is one subspecies: Liracraea odhneri benthicola Dell, 1956

== Description ==
Liracraea otakauica is a small marine gastropod mollusk characterized by a slender, elongate-conic shell. The shell reaches a length of approximately 7.8 mm and a diameter of about 2.7 mm.

The sculpture of the shell includes numerous fine axial ribs intersected by spiral cords, producing a reticulate or cancellate surface pattern. The whorls are convex, with well-marked sutures. The aperture is narrow and elongate, with a distinct siphonal canal, and the outer lip is sharp and simple.

The protoconch is smooth, suggesting planktotrophic larval development. The shell is generally off-white or pale cream in color, which is typical for deep-sea mangeliid species. Internal anatomy and soft-body morphology remain poorly documented, as is common for many deep-water conoidean gastropods.

== Distribution ==
This species is endemic to New Zealand occurs off Otago, within South-eastern South Island, Chatham Islands and Mernoo Bank, from 40-555m.

=== Some recorded Localities ===
- 250-300 metres, Head of Waitaki Canyon, off Oamaru, NZ *98
- 530-590 metres, Head of Karitane Canyon, off Taiaroa Head, NZ *98
- 110 metres, off Taiaroa Head, NZ, (holotype)
- 550 metres, Taiaroa Canyon, off Taiaroa Head, NZ *98
- 105 metres, NE of Cape Saunders, off Otago Peninsula, NZ
- 220 metres, off Taiaroa Head, NZ *98
- 550-600 metres, Papanui Canyon, off Otago Peninsula, NZ
- 220-350 metres, Papanui Canyon, off Otago Peninsula, NZ
- 360 metres, Saunders Canyon, off Otago Peninsula, NZ
- 150 metres, off Taieri, S of Dunedin, NZ
- 140 metres, SE of Nugget Point, SSW of Dunedin, NZ
