= Mioawateria bigranulosa =

Scientific classification
- Kingdom: Animalia
- Phylum: Mollusca
- Class: Gastropoda
- Subclass: Caenogastropoda
- Order: Neogastropoda
- Superfamily: Conoidea
- Family: Raphitomidae
- Genus: Mioawateria
- Species: M. bigranulosa

Binomial name
- Mioawateria bigranulosa (Okutani, 1964)

Synonyms
- Propebela bigranulosa Okutani, 1964

Species of gastropod

Mioawateria bigranulosa is a species of sea snail, a marine gastropod mollusk in the family Raphitomidae.

== Distribution ==
This marine species occurs off Japan
