= Awheaturris pahaoensis =

Scientific classification
- Kingdom: Animalia
- Phylum: Mollusca
- Class: Gastropoda
- Subclass: Caenogastropoda
- Order: Neogastropoda
- Superfamily: Conoidea
- Family: Raphitomidae
- Genus: Awheaturris
- Species: A. pahaoensis

Binomial name
- Awheaturris pahaoensis (Vella, 1954)

Synonyms
- Awateria (Miowateria) pahaoensis Vella, 1954

Extinct species of gastropod

Awheaturris pahaoensis is an extinct species of sea snail, a marine gastropod mollusk in the family Raphitomidae.

== Description ==
It was described by Vella in 1954 from fossil remains excavated in New Zealand. The fossil specimen measures 8.3 mm in length and 4.1 mm in diameter. It has a spindle-shaped shell with a long spire and a short body whorl. The shell is ornamented with longitudinal ribs that intersect with spiral cords, creating a reticulated pattern. The body whorl is smooth and glossy. The aperture is oval and has a thickened outer lip.

== Distribution ==
Fossils of Awheaturris pahaoensis have been found in Miocene strata in New Zealand, encompassing the time period between 11.608 and 5.332 million years ago. This species is named after the Pāhaoa River, also located in New Zealand, where the fossil specimens were discovered.
