= Mioawateria aitanga =

Scientific classification
- Kingdom: Animalia
- Phylum: Mollusca
- Class: Gastropoda
- Subclass: Caenogastropoda
- Order: Neogastropoda
- Superfamily: Conoidea
- Family: Raphitomidae
- Genus: Mioawateria
- Species: M. aitanga

Binomial name
- Mioawateria aitanga Grant-Mackie & Chapman-Smith, 1971

Extinct species of gastropod

Mioawateria aitanga is an extinct species of sea snail, a marine gastropod mollusk in the family Raphitomidae.

== Description ==
The length of the shell attains 8.6 mm, its diameter is 4.8 mm.

== Distribution ==
Fossils of this marine species were found in New Zealand.
