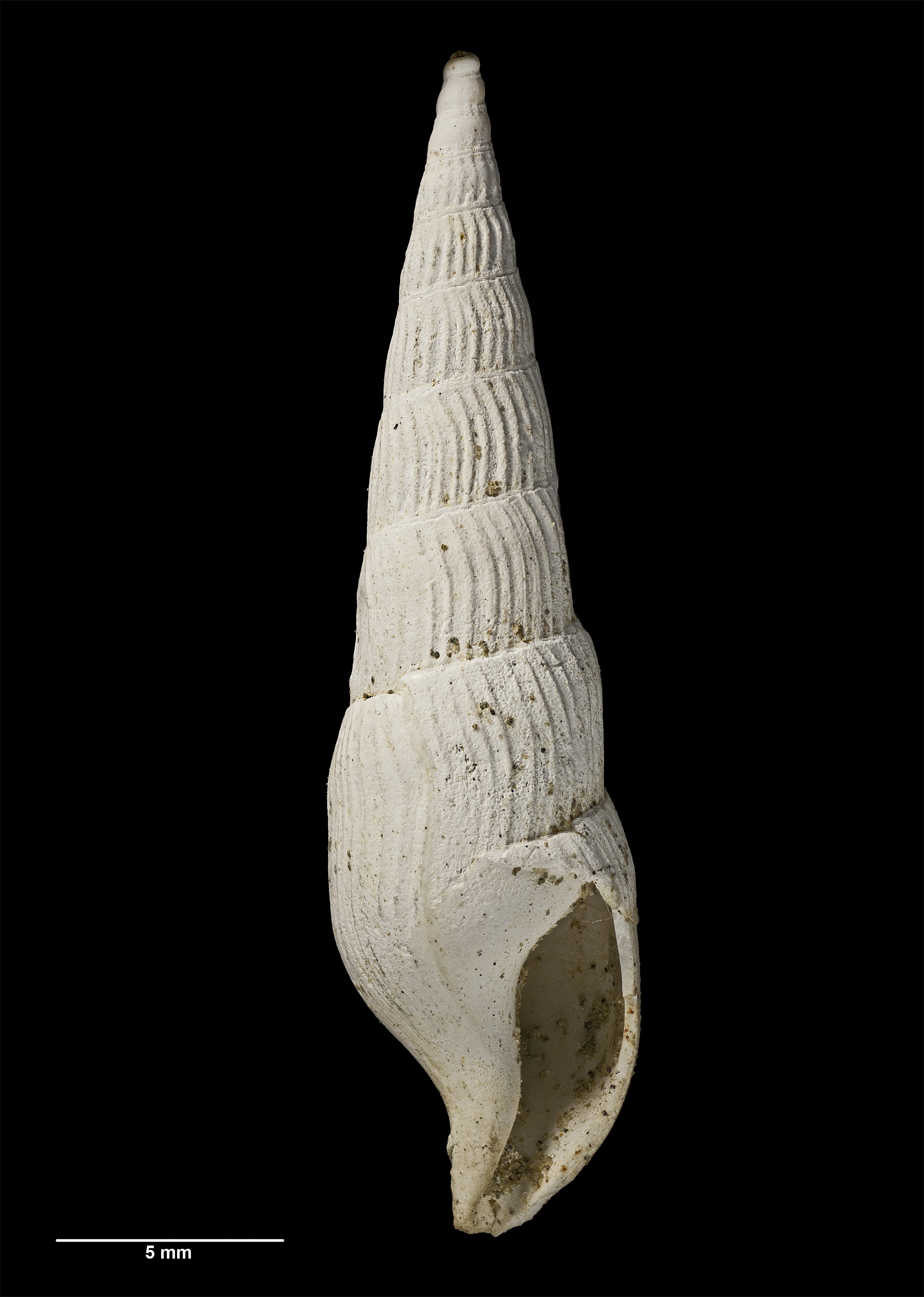
- Zeacuminia cantuariensis

Scientific classification
- Kingdom: Animalia
- Phylum: Mollusca
- Class: Gastropoda
- Subclass: Caenogastropoda
- Order: Neogastropoda
- Family: Terebridae
- Subfamily: Terebrinae
- Genus: †Zeacuminia; H. J. Finlay, 1930

Type species
- † Zeacuminia tahuia H. J. Finlay, 1930

= Zeacuminia =

Zeacuminia Temporal range: 42.6–3.70 Ma

Genus of gastropods

Zeacuminia is a genus of extinct sea snails, marine gastropod molluscs in the family Terebridae. Fossils in the genus date to between the Middle Eocene and the Pliocene, and have been found in New Zealand, Argentina and Chile.

== Description ==
Members of the genus have relatively longer canals, squarish body whorls, more strongly developed axial ribs, and a strong ridge found on the fasciole.

== Taxonomy ==
Zeacuminia was first described in 1930 by H. J. Finlay.

== Distribution ==
Almost all known fossil species in the genus have been found in New Zealand and South America. Fossils in New Zealand date to between the Bortonian stage of the Middle Eocene (42.6 million years ago) to the Waipipian stage of the Pliocene (3.70 million years ago), while fossils in Argentina dating to between the Oligocene and the Miocene. The species Z. costellata is found in the Navidad Formation of Chile, and dates to the Miocene.

== Species ==
Species within the genus Zeacuminia include:

- † Zeacuminia biplex (F. W. Hutton, 1885)
- † Zeacuminia cantuariensis Laws, 1933
- † Zeacuminia costellata (G. B. Sowerby I, 1846)
- † Zeacuminia fluctuosa Laws, 1941
- † Zeacuminia murdochi A. W. B. Powell, 1931
- † Zeacuminia orycta (Suter, 1913)
- † Zeacuminia pareoraensis (Suter, 1917)
- † Zeacuminia parva Laws, 1936
- † Zeacuminia planitas Laws, 1940
- † Zeacuminia subtilissima (Bartrum & A. W. B. Powell, 1928)
- † Zeacuminia suteri (Marwick, 1929)
- † Zeacuminia tahuia H. J. Finlay, 1930
- † Zeacuminia tantula Marwick, 1931
- † Zeacuminia transitorsa (Marwick, 1929)
- † Zeacuminia turpicula Marwick, 1931
- † Zeacuminia viapollentia P. A. Maxwell, 1988
