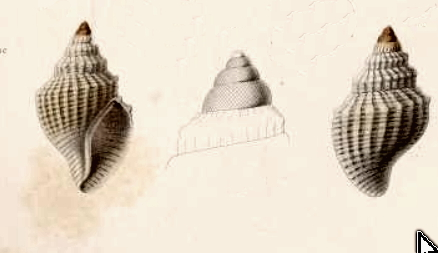
- Original image of a shell of Mioawateria watsoni

Scientific classification
- Kingdom: Animalia
- Phylum: Mollusca
- Class: Gastropoda
- Subclass: Caenogastropoda
- Order: Neogastropoda
- Superfamily: Conoidea
- Family: Raphitomidae
- Genus: Mioawateria
- Species: M. watsoni

Binomial name
- Mioawateria watsoni (Dautzenberg, 1889)

Synonyms
- Clathurella watsoni Dautzenberg, 1889; Gymnobela watsoni (Dautzenberg, 1889); Magnella watsoni (Dautzenberg, 1889)

= Mioawateria watsoni =

Species of gastropod

Mioawateria watsoni is a species of sea snail, a marine gastropod mollusk in the family Raphitomidae.

== Description ==
The length of the shell attains 10 mm.

The rather strong shell has a turreted shape and is composed of 8 convex whorls. The two first whorls are punctuated, the two subsequent whorls are covered with fine and regular cross-linking. The last whorls are strongly reticulated by high, longitudinal ribs, arched, twenty in number on the body whorl, and regular cords, fairly prominent, more spaced at the top of the whorls where they from, on the crest of the coasts, a series of tubercles. The aperture is oblong, occupying just over half of the total height of the shell. It is angular at the top and ends at the base in a short, open siphonal canal. The columella is faintly arched. The outer lip is subangular on its upper part and then arcuate. The interior of the outer lip is denticulate. The color of the shell is white with the top of the spire tinted orange-yellow.

== Distribution ==
This marine species occurs off Mauritania and the Azores.
