= Paracomitas flemingi =

Scientific classification
- Kingdom: Animalia
- Phylum: Mollusca
- Class: Gastropoda
- Subclass: Caenogastropoda
- Order: Neogastropoda
- Superfamily: Conoidea
- Family: Pseudomelatomidae
- Genus: Paracomitas
- Species: †P. flemingi

Binomial name
- †Paracomitas flemingi (Beu, 1970)

Synonyms
- †Macrosinus flemingi Beu, 1970; †Paracomitas (Macrosinus) flemingi Beu, 1970 – accepted, alternate representation

Extinct species of gastropod

Paracomitas flemingi is an extinct species of sea snail, a marine gastropod mollusk in the family Pseudomelatomidae, the turrids and allies.

== Distribution ==
This extinct marine species was endemic to New Zealand.
