= Paracomitas haumuria =

Scientific classification
- Kingdom: Animalia
- Phylum: Mollusca
- Class: Gastropoda
- Subclass: Caenogastropoda
- Order: Neogastropoda
- Superfamily: Conoidea
- Family: Pseudomelatomidae
- Genus: Paracomitas
- Species: P. haumuria

Binomial name
- Paracomitas haumuria Beu, 1979

Synonyms
- Macrosinus haumuria Beu, 1970· accepted, alternate representation; Paracomitas (Macrosinus) haumuria Beu, 1979· accepted, alternate representation

Species of gastropod

Paracomitas haumuria is a species of sea snail, a marine gastropod mollusk in the family Pseudomelatomidae, the turrids and allies.

== Distribution ==
This marine species is endemic to New Zealand and occurs off eastern South Island.
