= Puha hebes =

Scientific classification
- Kingdom: Animalia
- Phylum: Mollusca
- Class: Gastropoda
- Subclass: Caenogastropoda
- Order: Neogastropoda
- Superfamily: Conoidea
- Family: Raphitomidae
- Genus: †Puha
- Species: †P. hebes

Binomial name
- †Puha hebes (Hutton, 1873)

Synonyms
- † Pleurotoma hebes Hutton, 1873

Extinct species of gastropod

Puha hebes is an extinct species of sea snail, a marine gastropod mollusk in the family Raphitomidae.

== Description ==
(Original description) The shell is ovato-fusiform with a blunt spire. The whorls are rather angled and distantly spirally striated. The shell shows a spiral row of nodules along the keel. Above the keel it is smooth. The body whorl is larger than the spire. The siphonal canal has a moderate length.

== Distribution ==
Fossils of this marine species were found in New Zealand off Oamaru.
