= Puha fulgida =

Scientific classification
- Kingdom: Animalia
- Phylum: Mollusca
- Class: Gastropoda
- Subclass: Caenogastropoda
- Order: Neogastropoda
- Superfamily: Conoidea
- Family: Raphitomidae
- Genus: †Puha
- Species: †P. fulgida

Binomial name
- †Puha fulgida Marwick, 1931

Extinct species of gastropod

Puha fulgida is an extinct species of sea snail, a marine gastropod mollusk in the family Raphitomidae.

== Distribution ==
Fossils of this marine species were found in New Zealand .
