= Antimelatoma waimea =

Scientific classification
- Kingdom: Animalia
- Phylum: Mollusca
- Class: Gastropoda
- Subclass: Caenogastropoda
- Order: Neogastropoda
- Superfamily: Conoidea
- Family: Pseudomelatomidae
- Genus: Antimelatoma
- Species: A. waimea

Binomial name
- Antimelatoma waimea Beu, 2011

Extinct species of gastropod

Antimelatoma waimea is an extinct species of predatory sea snail, a marine gastropod mollusc in the family Pseudomelatomidae.

== Distribution ==
This extinct marine species was endemic to New Zealand.
