= Awateria evanida =

Scientific classification
- Kingdom: Animalia
- Phylum: Mollusca
- Class: Gastropoda
- Subclass: Caenogastropoda
- Order: Neogastropoda
- Superfamily: Conoidea
- Family: Borsoniidae
- Genus: Awateria
- Species: A. evanida

Binomial name
- Awateria evanida Suter, 1917

Extinct species of gastropod

Awateria evanida is an extinct species of sea snail, a marine gastropod mollusk in the family Borsoniidae.

== Distribution ==
This extinct marine species was endemic to New Zealand.
