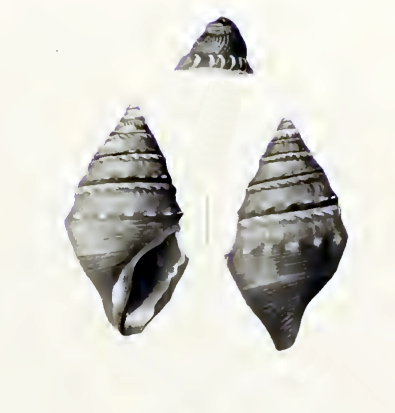
- Original image of a shell of Acanthodaphne abbreviata

Scientific classification
- Kingdom: Animalia
- Phylum: Mollusca
- Class: Gastropoda
- Subclass: Caenogastropoda
- Order: Neogastropoda
- Superfamily: Conoidea
- Family: Raphitomidae
- Genus: Acanthodaphne
- Species: A. abbreviata

Binomial name
- Acanthodaphne abbreviata (Schepman, 1913)

Synonyms
- Buccinaria abbreviata (Schepman, 1913); Cryptodaphne abbreviata (Schepman, 1913); Pleurotomella abbreviata Schepman, 1913

= Acanthodaphne abbreviata =

Species of gastropod

Acanthodaphne abbreviata is a species of sea snail, a marine gastropod mollusk in the family Raphitomidae.

== Description ==
The length of the species reaches 6 mm, its diameter 3¼ mm.

(Original description) The small, thin shell has a shortly biconical shape. it is transparently white. It contains about 8 whorls (the protoconch is slightly eroded), of which 4 form a brownish (bleached) nucleus. Subsequent whorls (excepted last one), practically exist only of the excavation, which is sculptured by curved, raised striae and is bordered, just below the suture, by a conspicuous, spiral liration, with laterally compressed, fold-like beads. These become fainter towards the aperture. Just above the suture, a second row of depressed, slightly pointed tubercles, form a keel below the excavation of the body whorl, about 12 in number on that whorl, where they form the top of short, oblique, axial ribs. The lower part of the body whorl contains about 15 lirae and a few intermediate ones. Moreover, fine growth-striae and excessively small granules are visible on the whole shell, by the aid of a strong lens. The body whorl is regularly attenuated towards its base, only slightly convex, with a very short, broad siphonal canal. The aperture is obliquely oblong, with a sharp angle above and a narrow gutterlike siphonal canal below. The peristome is thin, with a wide, moderately deep sinus above. The columellar margin is slightly concave above, straighter and directed to the left along the siphonal canal, with a thin layer of enamel, thicker below.

== Distribution ==
This marine species occurs off Eastern Indonesia in the Ceram Sea, at depths of 835 meters.
