= Awheaturris quisquilia =

Scientific classification
- Kingdom: Animalia
- Phylum: Mollusca
- Class: Gastropoda
- Subclass: Caenogastropoda
- Order: Neogastropoda
- Superfamily: Conoidea
- Family: Raphitomidae
- Genus: Awheaturris
- Species: A. quisquilia

Binomial name
- Awheaturris quisquilia (R. A. Philippi, 1887)

Synonyms
- Pleurotoma quisquilia Philippi, 1887; Mioawateria quisquilia Shuto, 1992

Extinct species of gastropod

Awheaturris quisquilia is an extinct species of sea snail, a marine gastropod mollusk in the family Raphitomidae.

== Distribution ==
Fossils of this marine species were found in Miocene strata in Central Chile.
