= Paracomitas beui =

Scientific classification
- Kingdom: Animalia
- Phylum: Mollusca
- Class: Gastropoda
- Subclass: Caenogastropoda
- Order: Neogastropoda
- Superfamily: Conoidea
- Family: Pseudomelatomidae
- Genus: Paracomitas
- Species: P. beui

Binomial name
- Paracomitas beui Maxwell, 1988

Synonyms
- † Macrosinus beui (Maxwell, 1988); † Paracomitas (Macrosinus) beui Maxwell, 1988 · accepted, alternate representation

Extinct species of gastropod

Paracomitas beui is an extinct species of sea snail, a marine gastropod mollusk in the family Pseudomelatomidae, the turrids and allies.

== Distribution ==
This extinct marine species is endemic to New Zealand.
