= Liracraea dictyota =

Scientific classification
- Kingdom: Animalia
- Phylum: Mollusca
- Class: Gastropoda
- Subclass: Caenogastropoda
- Order: Neogastropoda
- Superfamily: Conoidea
- Family: Mangeliidae
- Genus: Liracraea
- Species: L. dictyota

Binomial name
- Liracraea dictyota (F.W. Hutton, 1885)

Extinct species of gastropod

Liracraea dictyota is an extinct species of sea snail, a marine gastropod mollusk in the family Mangeliidae.

== Distribution ==
This extinct species is endemic to New Zealand and fossils were found off Stewart Island.
