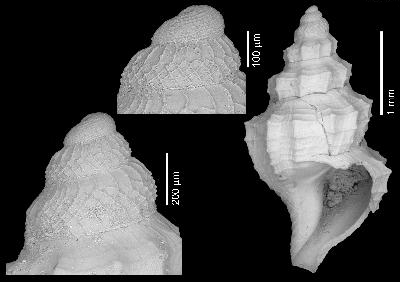
- Shell of Mioawateria hondelattensis (holotype in MNHN, Paris)

Scientific classification
- Kingdom: Animalia
- Phylum: Mollusca
- Class: Gastropoda
- Subclass: Caenogastropoda
- Order: Neogastropoda
- Superfamily: Conoidea
- Family: Raphitomidae
- Genus: Mioawateria
- Species: M. hondelattensis

Binomial name
- Mioawateria hondelattensis Lozouet, 2017 †

= Mioawateria hondelattensis =

Extinct species of gastropod

Mioawateria hondelattensis is an extinct species of sea snail, a marine gastropod mollusk in the family Raphitomidae.

== Distribution ==
Fossils of this marine species were found in Oligocene strata in the Landes, Aquitaine, France.
