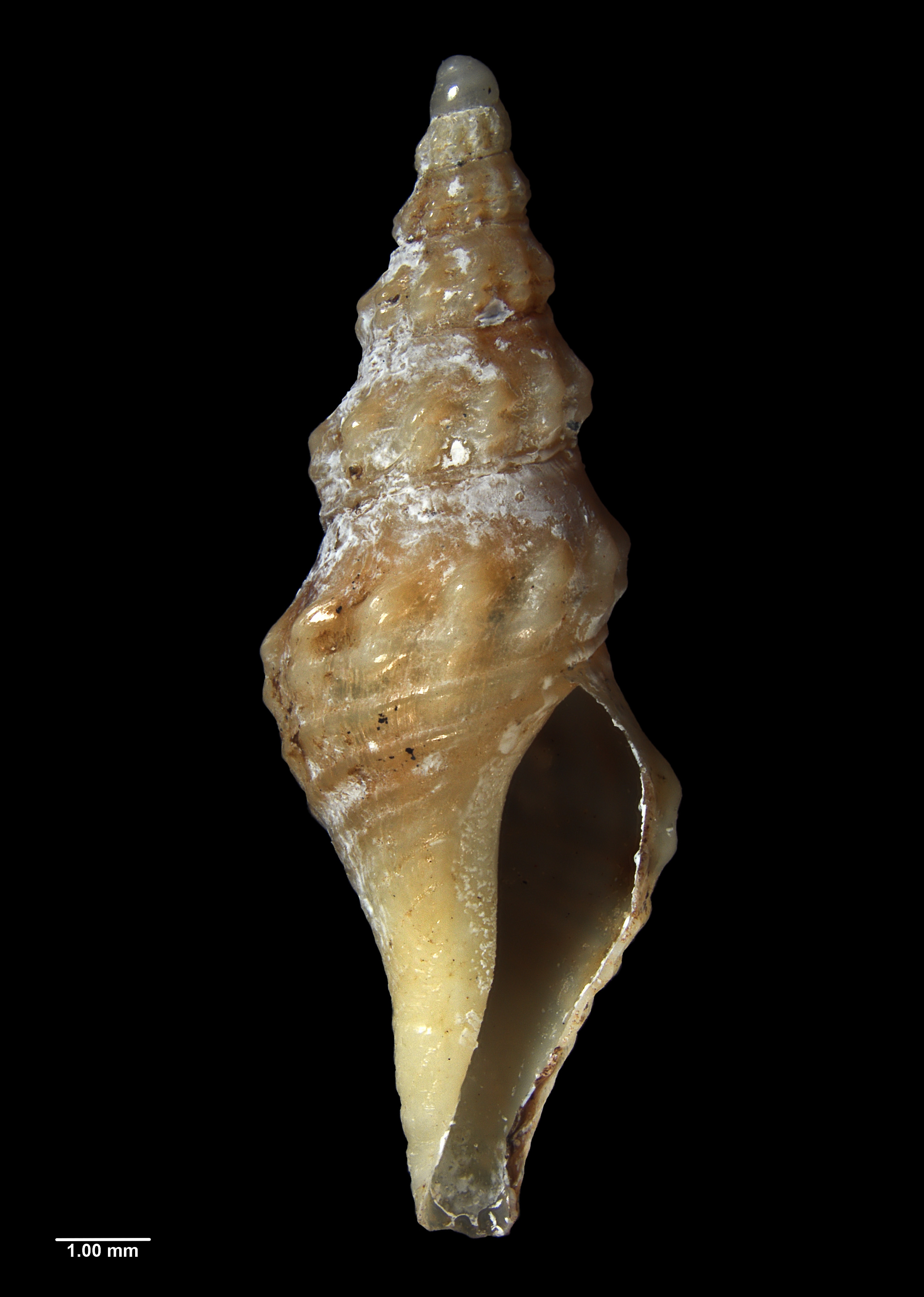
- Type specimen of Antimelatoma buchanani

Scientific classification
- Kingdom: Animalia
- Phylum: Mollusca
- Class: Gastropoda
- Subclass: Caenogastropoda
- Order: Neogastropoda
- Superfamily: Conoidea
- Family: Pseudomelatomidae
- Genus: Antimelatoma
- Species: A. buchanani

Binomial name
- Antimelatoma buchanani (Hutton, 1873)

Synonyms
- Antimelatoma ahiparana Powell, 1942; Antimelatoma benthicola Powell, 1942; Antimelatoma buchanani maorum (E.A. Smith, 1877); Drillia maorum E.A. Smith, 1877; Pleurotoma buchanani F.W. Hutton, 1873 (original combination)

= Antimelatoma buchanani =

Species of gastropod

Antimelatoma buchanani is a species of predatory sea snail, a marine gastropod mollusc in the family Pseudomelatomidae.

== Description ==
The length of the shell attains 20 mm, its diameter 6 mm.

(Original description) The fusiform shell is elongated. The spire is acute. The whorls are carinated, with fine spiral lines, and obliquely plicated anteriorly. The posterior part is smooth, concave, with a slight ridge at the suture. The aperture is oval. The siphonal canal produced. The body whorl is longer than the spire.

The shell is elongate-fusiform. The whorls are obliquely longitudinally plaited, and show fine spiral ribs below the sinus area. Above the sinus area smooth, concave, with a slight ridge at the suture. Between 11 and 15 longitudinal plications on a whorl. The aperture is oval. The siphonal canal is produced, rather bent.

The protoconch is composed of two oblique smooth turns, the anterior portion having four deep spiral sulci, cutting through the small longitudinal costae of the brephic stage, into which the protoconch imperceptibly passes.

== Distribution ==
This marine species is endemic to New Zealand and occurs off Northland to East Cape

Fossils have been found in Pliocene strata in New Zealand.

== Gallery ==
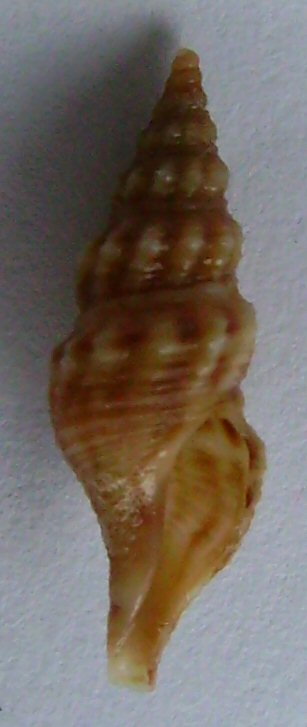
A shell of Antimelatoma buchanani maorum

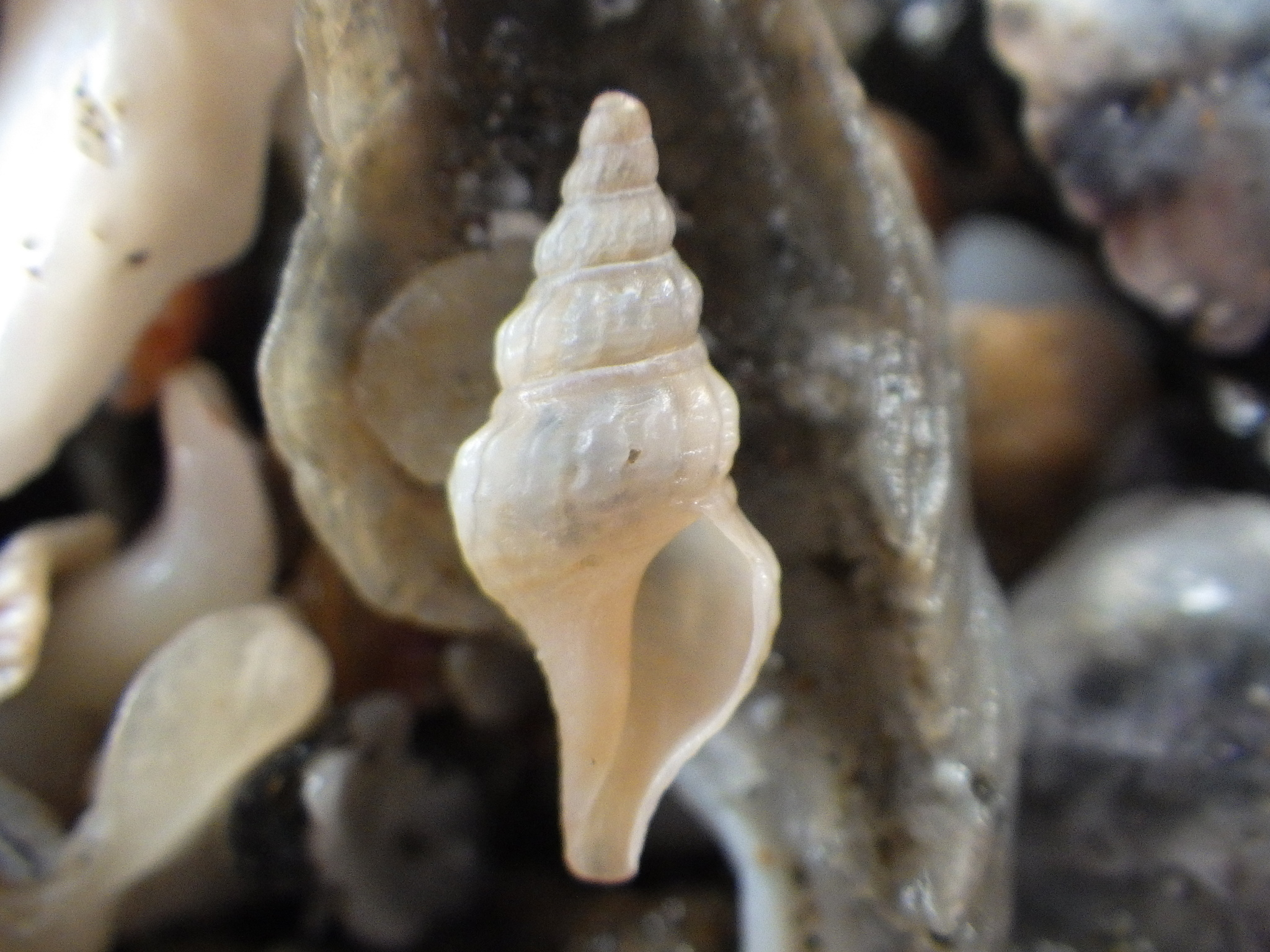
Shell found in Takapuna, Auckland

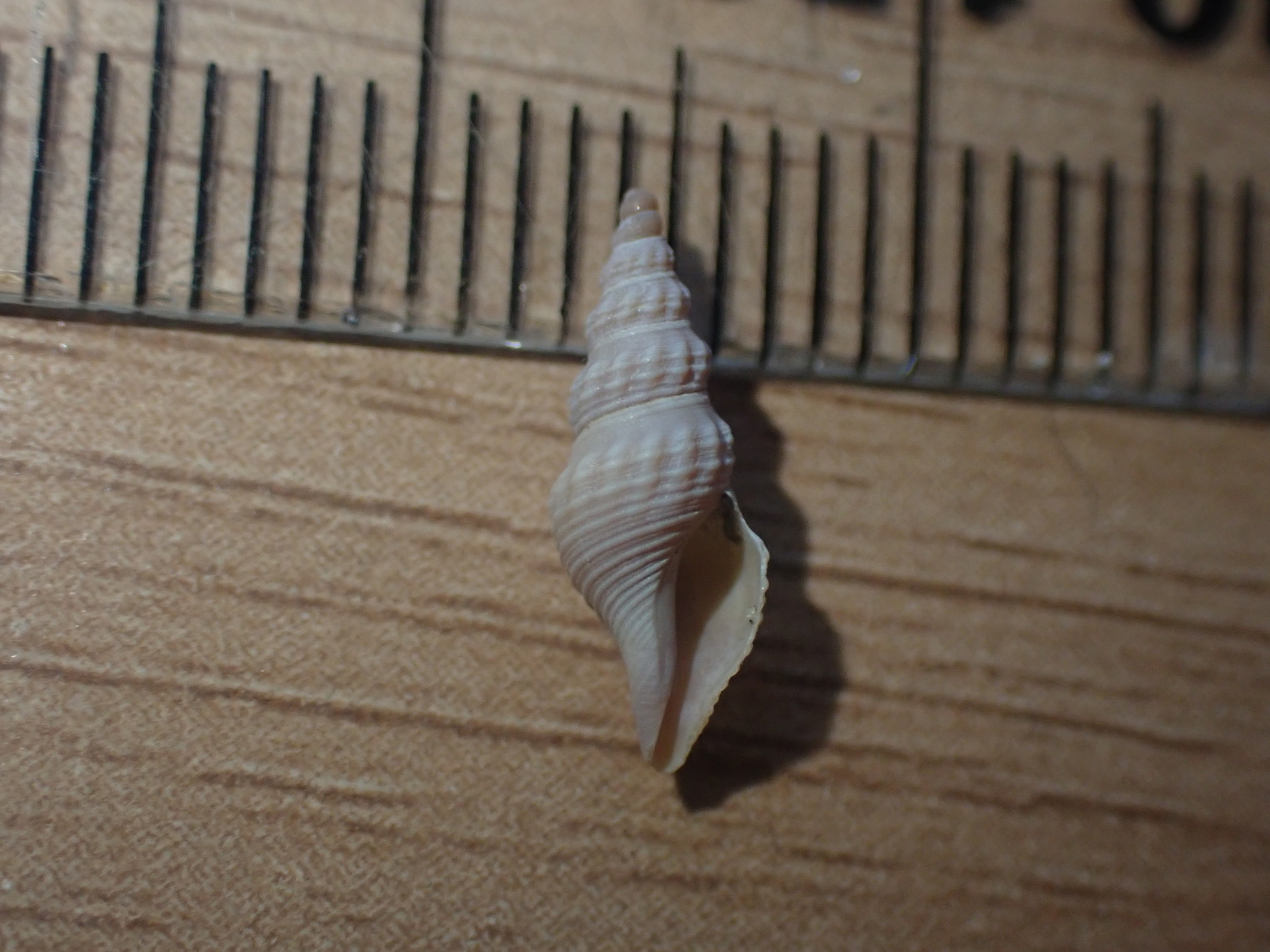
Shell found near Te Ārai, Auckland Region
