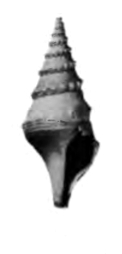
- Original image of a shell of Paracomitas rodgersi

Scientific classification
- Kingdom: Animalia
- Phylum: Mollusca
- Class: Gastropoda
- Subclass: Caenogastropoda
- Order: Neogastropoda
- Superfamily: Conoidea
- Family: Pseudomelatomidae
- Genus: Paracomitas
- Species: P. rodgersi

Binomial name
- Paracomitas rodgersi MacNeil, 1960

= Paracomitas rodgersi =

Extinct species of gastropod

Paracomitas rodgersi is an extinct species of sea snail, a marine gastropod mollusk in the family Pseudomelatomidae, the turrids and allies.

== Description ==
The length of the shell attains 27 mm.

(Original description) The shell is of medium size and inflation. The whorls are nearly straight sided, interrupted mainly by the nodose peripheral carina. The protoconch is small, subnaticoidal and tilted. The aperture is moderately narrow, about half the length of the shell. The outer lip is thin, broken on the specimens at hand, but shown by growth lines to recurve sharply into the anal sinus. The anal sinus is moderately broad and deep, adjacent to the suture, the growth lines recurving only slightly from the apex of the sinus to the suture. The sculpture consists of short axial nodes on the periphery, about ten of the peripheral nodes visible from an angle. The lower part of the body whorl and the columella bear weak raised spirals which are wider near the periphery, narrower and nearly obsolete on the columella. The peripheral nodes are crossed by both the spiral sculpture and diagonal lines of growth. The subsutural slope is smooth and flat except for lines of growth marking former positions of the anal sinus, and the small tubercles or wrinkles just below the suture on the juvenile whorls.

A.W.B. Powell (1969) doubted if this species belonged to Paracomitas

== Distribution ==
This extinct marine species is endemic to Okinawa, Japan and was found in Pliocene strata
