= Mioawateria asarotum =

Scientific classification
- Kingdom: Animalia
- Phylum: Mollusca
- Class: Gastropoda
- Subclass: Caenogastropoda
- Order: Neogastropoda
- Superfamily: Conoidea
- Family: Raphitomidae
- Genus: Mioawateria
- Species: M. asarotum

Binomial name
- Mioawateria asarotum Sysoev, 1997

Species of gastropod

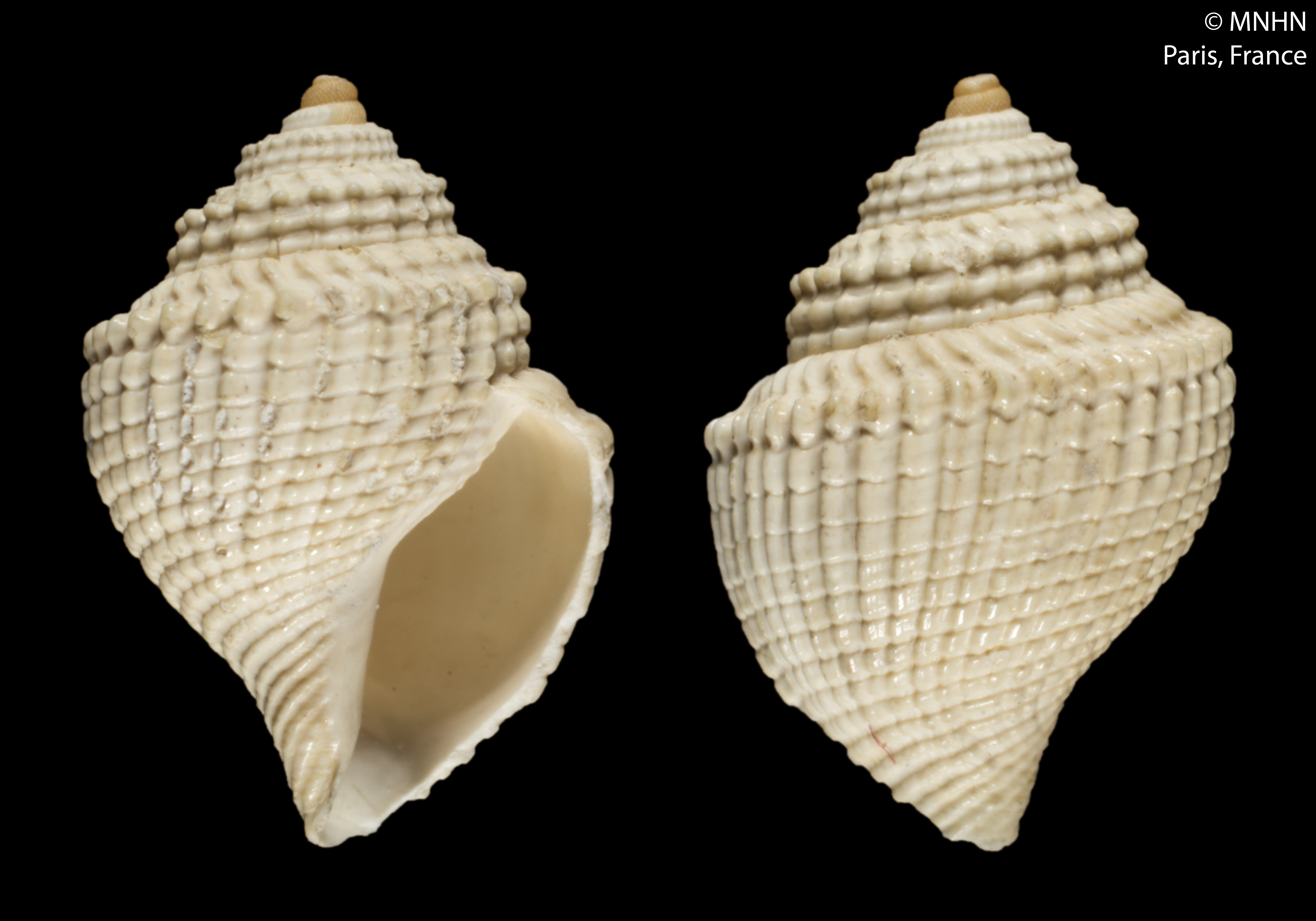
Mioawateria asarotum

Mioawateria asarotum is a species of sea snail, a marine gastropod mollusk in the family Raphitomidae.

== Description ==
The length of the shell attains 6.9 mm, its diameter 4.8 mm.

== Distribution ==
This marine species was found off Indonesia and in the Arafura Sea, at depths between 884 m-891 m.
