= Mioawateria rhomboidea =

Scientific classification
- Kingdom: Animalia
- Phylum: Mollusca
- Class: Gastropoda
- Subclass: Caenogastropoda
- Order: Neogastropoda
- Superfamily: Conoidea
- Family: Raphitomidae
- Genus: Mioawateria
- Species: M. rhomboidea

Binomial name
- Mioawateria rhomboidea (Powell, 1942)

Synonyms
- Gymnobela rhomboidea Thiele, 1925 (original combination)

Species of gastropod

Mioawateria rhomboidea is a species of sea snail, a marine gastropod mollusk in the family Raphitomidae.

== Distribution ==
This marine species occurs off West Africa .
