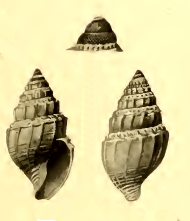
- Original image of the shell and protoconch of Mioawateria extensaeformis

Scientific classification
- Kingdom: Animalia
- Phylum: Mollusca
- Class: Gastropoda
- Subclass: Caenogastropoda
- Order: Neogastropoda
- Superfamily: Conoidea
- Family: Raphitomidae
- Genus: Mioawateria
- Species: M. extensaeformis

Binomial name
- Mioawateria extensaeformis (Schepman, 1913)

Synonyms
- Pleurotomella extensaeformis Schepman, 1913

= Mioawateria extensaeformis =

Species of gastropod

Mioawateria extensaeformis is a species of sea snail, a marine gastropod mollusk in the family Raphitomidae.

== Description ==
The length of the shell attains 8.5 mm, its diameter 4.5 mm.

(Original description) The rather strong, ivory-white, ovate shell has a short spire. It contains 8 or 9 whorls (the upper part is eroded) of which 3 (or 4) form a reddish-brown, convexly-whorled protoconch, of which about the two lower ones are sculptured by slightly curved riblets, crossed in their lower part by fine, oblique striae. The subsequent whorls are scarcely excavated, the place of the excavation being occupied for a great deal by a rather strong, subsutural spiral, adorned by strong, laterally compressed beads, 22 in number on the body whorl. Below this spiral remains a rather large groove. The basal part of the whorls show narrow, a little oblique ribs, 15 in number on the body whorl, ending below the groove in short tubercles, which are connected by a second spiral. The space between the ribs is sculptured by fine and coarse growth-lines and faint spiral striae, becoming stronger and groove-like towards the base of the body whorl, and have the character of lirae on the short, large siphonal canal. The body whorl is regularly convex, until the siphonal canal. The aperture is oval, with a moderately sharp angle above and a wide, slightly gutter-like canal below. The peristome is broken, probably with a very shallow sinus (judging after growth-lines). The concave columellar margin shows a thin layer of enamel. The siphonal canal is directed to the left.

== Distribution ==
This marine species is found off Western Sumatra and in the Banda Sea, at depths between 462 and 750 meters.
