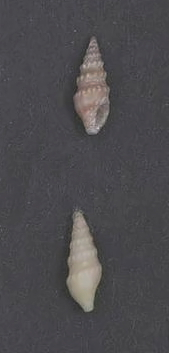
- Shells of Splendrillia woodsi (Museum specimens at Naturalis Biodiversity Center)

Scientific classification
- Kingdom: Animalia
- Phylum: Mollusca
- Class: Gastropoda
- Subclass: Caenogastropoda
- Order: Neogastropoda
- Superfamily: Conoidea
- Family: Drilliidae
- Genus: Splendrillia
- Species: S. woodsi

Binomial name
- Splendrillia woodsi (Beddome, 1883)

Synonyms
- Antimelatoma agasma Cotton, B.C. 1947; Austrodrillia woodsi (Beddome, 1883); Drillia howitti Pritchard & Gatliff, 1899; Drillia woodsi Beddome, 1883 (original combination); Splendrillia agasma B.C. Cotton, 1947; Splendrillia howitti G.B. Pritchard & J.H. Gatliff, 1899; Splendrillia molleri Laseron, C. 1954

= Splendrillia woodsi =

Species of gastropod

Splendrillia woodsi is a species of sea snail, a marine gastropod mollusk in the family Drilliidae.

It was previously categorized as Austrodrillia woodsi within the family Turridae.

The subspecies Drillia woodsi acostata Verco, 1909 is considered a synonym of Splendrillia acostata (Verco, 1909)

== Description ==
The length of the shell attains 18 mm.

(Original description) The shell is elongately fusiform and turretted. The spire is longer than the aperture, shining orange colour. The sutures show a white line, below which there is a band of white nodules. On the body whorl there is a row of white spots below the nodules. The shell contains 7 whorls. The apex is mamillated. The aperture is ovate. The sinus is deep. The outer lip is thin.

The thick and strong shell is elongately turreted, with a spire about 2½ times the length of the aperture, and consisting of a smooth convex translucent protoconch of about 1½ whorls, succeeded by about seven, gradually increasing nodose whorls. The apex is obtuse. The whorls are very slightly convex, with a well-marked suture, and a broad flat or very slightly convex area below the suture occupying a little less than half the breadth of the whorls. Below the sutural band, the whorls are more markedly convex owing to the presence of smooth oblique nodosities, which number from about ten to thirteen or fourteen to the whorl, usually with thirteen on the penultimate whorl. The shell is otherwise smooth showing the lines of growth only very faintly. The aperture is narrow-ovate, with a broad shallow sinus fully occupying the flat area below the suture. The breadth of the sinus is somewhat detracted from by the presence of a large and prominent tubercle on the columellar side. The columella is white and slightly twisted. The anterior canal is very short, but relatively rather broad. The outer lip is thin at the margin and smooth within. The colour of the shell is white, creamy, or light brown.

== Distribution ==
This marine species occurs off the Philippines and Australia (New South Wales, South Australia, Tasmania, Victoria and Western Australia)
