= Splendrillia acostata =

Scientific classification
- Kingdom: Animalia
- Phylum: Mollusca
- Class: Gastropoda
- Subclass: Caenogastropoda
- Order: Neogastropoda
- Superfamily: Conoidea
- Family: Drilliidae
- Genus: Splendrillia
- Species: S. acostata

Binomial name
- Splendrillia acostata (Verco, 1909)

Synonyms
- Austrodrillia woodsi acostata J.C. Verco, 1909; Drillia woodsi acostata Verco J.C., 1909 (original combination); Melatoma woodsi acostata (Verco, 1909)

Species of gastropod

Splendrillia acostata is a species of sea snail, a marine gastropod mollusk in the family Drilliidae.

== Distribution ==
This marine species is endemic to Australia and occurs off South Australia and Western Australia.
