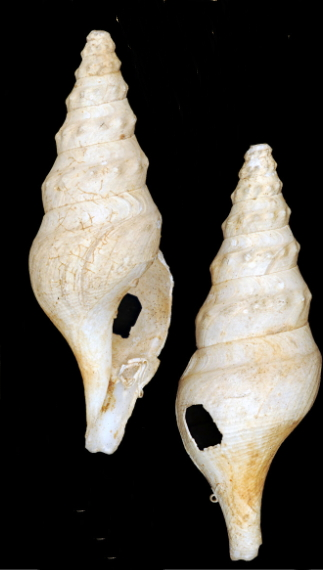
- Shell of Leucosyrinx undosa (holotypr at Naturalis Biodiversity Center)

Scientific classification
- Kingdom: Animalia
- Phylum: Mollusca
- Class: Gastropoda
- Subclass: Caenogastropoda
- Order: Neogastropoda
- Superfamily: Conoidea
- Family: Pseudomelatomidae
- Genus: Leucosyrinx
- Species: L. undosa

Binomial name
- Leucosyrinx undosa (Schepman, 1913)

Synonyms
- Comitas undosa Schepman, 1913; Paracomitas undosa (Schepman, 1913) ·; Surcula undosa Schepman, 1913

= Leucosyrinx undosa =

Species of gastropod

Leucosyrinx undosa is a species of sea snail, a marine gastropod mollusk in the family Pseudomelatomidae, the turrids and allies.

== Description ==
The length of the shell attains 30 mm, the diameter 4½ mm (this may have been more if the peristome was complete).

(Original description) The elongately fusiform shell has a rather long siphonal canal. The rather strong shell is yellowish-white. The protoconch is wanting. The 6½ remaining whorls are separated by a conspicuous, simple suture. They are convex and slightly excavated at their upper part. The sculpture consists of numerous, very irregular, spiral striae, more conspicuous at the base of shell and siphonal canal, scarcely traceable in the excavation. The upper whorls show a peripheral row of obtuse tubercles, which in the uppermost whorls have the character of ribs. These tubercles disappear on the body whorl, which has only a more prominent keellike spiral just below the excavation. The whorls are moreover crossed by numerous growth lines, strongly curved and conspicuous in the excavation, oblique and sometimes riblike in the lower part, which produces a wavy appearance of some parts of the shell. The aperture is oblong, angular above, ending below in a rather long, broad siphonal canal, slightly directed to the left The peristome is broken, but according to growth lines shows a deep sinus at the suture, then is strongly protracted. The columellar margin is regularly curved, with a thin layer of enamel, slightly contorted along the siphonal canal.

== Distribution ==
This marine species occurs in the Flores Sea and the Molucca Passage near Indonesia.
