= Mioawateria expalliata =

Scientific classification
- Kingdom: Animalia
- Phylum: Mollusca
- Class: Gastropoda
- Subclass: Caenogastropoda
- Order: Neogastropoda
- Superfamily: Conoidea
- Family: Raphitomidae
- Genus: Mioawateria
- Species: M. expalliata

Binomial name
- Mioawateria expalliata (Laws, 1947)

Synonyms
- † Awateria expalliata Laws, 1947 (original combination)

Extinct species of gastropod

Mioawateria expalliata is an extinct species of sea snail, a marine gastropod mollusk in the family Raphitomidae.

== Distribution ==
Fossils of this marine species were found in New Zealand .
