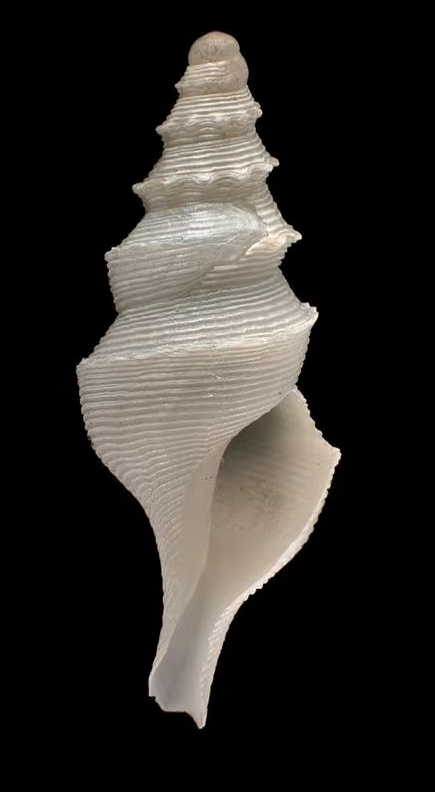
- Shell of Leucosyrinx canyonensis (holotype at Museum of New Zealand)

Scientific classification
- Kingdom: Animalia
- Phylum: Mollusca
- Class: Gastropoda
- Subclass: Caenogastropoda
- Order: Neogastropoda
- Superfamily: Conoidea
- Family: Pseudomelatomidae
- Genus: Leucosyrinx
- Species: L. canyonensis

Binomial name
- Leucosyrinx canyonensis (Dell, 1956)

Synonyms
- Antimelatoma canyonensis Dell, 1956

= Leucosyrinx canyonensis =

Species of gastropod

Leucosyrinx canyonensis is a species of small predatory sea snail, a marine gastropod mollusc in the family Pseudomelatomidae, the turrids and allies.

== Description ==
The species is characterized by a small shell (length of the shell 9.3 mm in the holotype) with strong spiral cords and a distinct crenulated shoulder carina. It is rather different from known species of Leucosyrinx, but in the absence of any data on anatomy, it is retained in Leucosyrinx with strong doubts.

== Distribution ==
This marine species is endemic to New Zealand and occurs off South Island at depths between 475 m and 640 m.
