= Acanthodaphne pusula =

Scientific classification
- Kingdom: Animalia
- Phylum: Mollusca
- Class: Gastropoda
- Subclass: Caenogastropoda
- Order: Neogastropoda
- Superfamily: Conoidea
- Family: Raphitomidae
- Genus: Acanthodaphne
- Species: A. pusula

Binomial name
- Acanthodaphne pusula (C.R. Laws, 1947)

Synonyms
- † Gymnobela pusula (Laws, 1947); † Puha pusula C.R. Laws, 1947

Extinct species of gastropod

Acanthodaphne pusula is an extinct species of sea snail, a marine gastropod mollusk in the family Raphitomidae.

== Description ==
This species was first described by Charles Reed Laws in 1947 and named Puha pusula.

== Distribution ==
Fossils of this marine species were found in Early Miocene strata in New Zealand.
