= Mioawateria sinusigera =

Scientific classification
- Kingdom: Animalia
- Phylum: Mollusca
- Class: Gastropoda
- Subclass: Caenogastropoda
- Order: Neogastropoda
- Superfamily: Conoidea
- Family: Raphitomidae
- Genus: Mioawateria
- Species: M. sinusigera

Binomial name
- Mioawateria sinusigera (Powell, 1942)

Synonyms
- † Puha sinusigera Powell, 1942

Extinct species of gastropod

Mioawateria sinusigera is an extinct species of sea snail, a marine gastropod mollusk in the family Raphitomidae.

== Distribution ==
Fossils of this marine species were found in New Zealand.
