= Robert C. Murdoch =

New Zealand zoologist

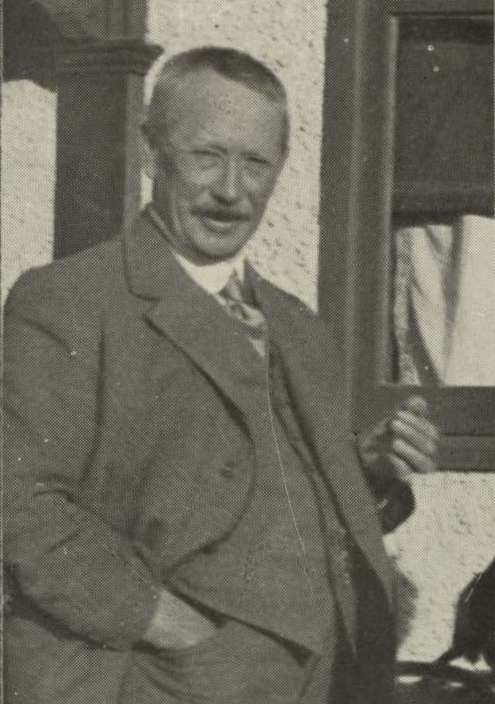
Robert C. Murdoch

Robert C. Murdoch (3 February 1861 in Wangaratta, Victoria, Australia – 11 November 1923) was a malacologist in New Zealand.

== Biography ==
He received a secondary-school education, and afterwards travelled with Captain Shuttleworth, of Wanganui. He spent some years subsequent to 1888 in farming near Wanganui, but in 1892 he went to Sydney and studied Mollusca with Mr. Charles Hedley. Afterwards he entered commercial life, which he followed until his death on 11 November 1923. He had a kind and sympathetic nature and it gained for him a multitude of friends throughout the country.

== Scientific work ==
For many years Murdoch devoted all of his spare time to the study of the New Zealand Mollusca. He was several times a contributor to Transactions and Proceedings of the New Zealand Institute and to the Journal of the Malacological Society. At the time of his sudden and unexpected death, he had arranged to give up business life and devote himself solely to research. During a visit to England about 1914, his important and extensive collections, which included several type specimens of New Zealand Mollusca, were destroyed in a fire. Murdoch was unmarried, and was well known as a prominent Freemason.

Murdoch cooperated with the geologist Patrick Marshall on fossil molluscs.

He formally named and described some species of sea snails, marine gastropods, including:

- Peculator hedleyi (Murdoch, 1905)
- Aclis subcarinata (Murdoch & Suter, 1906)

== Recognition ==
The generic name Murdochia is in honor of him. The fossil mollusc species Zeacuminia murdochi was named in Murdoch's honour by A. W. B. Powell in 1931.

== Bibliography ==
- (1894) "Notes on the variation and habits of Schizoglossa novoseelandica". Proceedings of the malacological society 1(3): 138.
- (1899) "Description of some New Species of Pliocene Mollusca from the Wanganui District, with Notes on other Described Species. ". Transactions and Proceedings of the New Zealand Institute 32: 216–221.
- (1901) Journal of Malacology 8: 73–85.
- (1902) "On the Anatomy of Paryphanta busbyi, Gray". Transactions of the Royal Society of New Zealand 35: 258–262, plate XXVII.
- (1903) "On the Anatomy of Paryphanta fumosa, Tenison-Woods". Transactions and Proceedings of the New Zealand Institute 36: 156–161.
- (1904) "Additions to the Marine Mollusca of New Zealand". Transactions and Proceedings of the New Zealand Institute 37: 217–232.
- (1905) "On the Anatomy of Paryphanta atramentaria, Shuttleworth". Transactions and Proceedings of the New Zealand Institute 38: 313–316.
- Marshall P. & Murdoch R. C. (1919) "Some New Fossil Species of Mollusca". Transactions and Proceedings of the New Zealand Institute 51: 253–258.
- Marshall P. & Murdoch R. C. (1921) "Some Tertiary Mollusca, with Descriptions of New Species". Transactions and Proceedings of the New Zealand Institute 53 77–84.
- Marshall P. & Murdoch R. C. (1921) "Fossils from the Paparoa Rapids, on the Wanganui River". Transactions and Proceedings of the New Zealand Institute 53: 85–86.
- Marshall P. & Murdoch R. C. (1921) "Tertiary Rocks near Hawera". Transactions and Proceedings of the New Zealand Institute 53: 86–96.
- Marshall P. & Murdoch R. C. (1923) "The Occurrence of the Genus Lahillia in New Zealand". Transactions and Proceedings of the New Zealand Institute 54: 129–130.
- Marshall P. & Murdoch R. C. (1924) "The Tertiary Rocks of the Wanganui – South Taranaki Coast". Transactions and Proceedings of the New Zealand Institute 55: 155–156.
- (1924) "Some Tertiary Mollusca, with Descriptions of New Species". Transactions and Proceedings of the New Zealand Institute 57: 157–160.
