= Abrupta =

Abrupta may refer to:

- Acacia abrupta, species of flowering plant
- Aldabrachelys abrupta, species of giant tortoise
- Alvania abrupta, species of minute sea snail
- Amanita abrupta, species of fungus
- Anthophora abrupta, species of anthophorine bee
- Autoba abrupta, species of moth
- Borsonella abrupta, species of sea snail
- Calamotropha abrupta, species of moth
- Carex abrupta, species of sedge
- Carthara abrupta, species of snout moth
- Crematogaster abrupta, species of ant
- Curveulima abrupta, species of sea snail
- Empoasca abrupta, species of insect
- Ephialtias abrupta, species of moth
- Eudonia abrupta, species of moth
- Hystricia abrupta, species of bristle fly
- Ipomoea abrupta, species of plant
- Lampsilis abrupta, species of freshwater mussel
- Melipotis abrupta, species of moth
- Mordellistena abrupta, species of beetle
- Panopea abrupta, species of large marine bivalve mollusc
- Pseudopostega abrupta, species of moth
- Pterostylis abrupta, species of orchid
- Thelymitra abrupta, species of orchid
- Tomoxia abrupta, species of beetle
- Turbonilla abrupta, species of sea snail
