= Borsonellopsis =

Scientific classification
- Kingdom: Animalia
- Phylum: Mollusca
- Class: Gastropoda
- Subclass: Caenogastropoda
- Order: Neogastropoda
- Superfamily: Conoidea
- Family: Borsoniidae
- Genus: Borsonellopsis; McLean, 1971

Type species
- Leucosyrinx erosina Dall, 1908

Genus of gastropods

Borsonellopsis is a genus of sea snails, marine gastropod mollusks in the family Borsoniidae.

== Description ==
In contrast with Borsonella, the shells in this genus are larger in size, have a weakly plicate columella and have a vestigial operculum with an apical nucleus.

== Species ==
McLean included the following species within the genus Borsonellopsis but the database WoRMS still considers them as belonging to Borsonella.

- Borsonella callicesta (Dall, 1902)
- Borsonella diegensis (Dall, 1908)
- Borsonella erosina (Dall, 1908)
