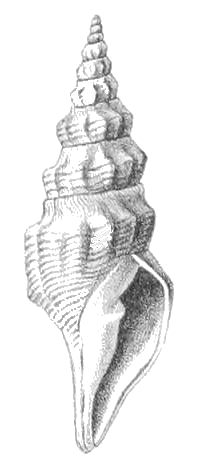
- Drawing of a shell of Borsonia epigona

Scientific classification
- Kingdom: Animalia
- Phylum: Mollusca
- Class: Gastropoda
- Subclass: Caenogastropoda
- Order: Neogastropoda
- Superfamily: Conoidea
- Family: Borsoniidae
- Genus: Borsonia; Bellardi, 1839

Type species
- Borsonia prima Bellardi, L., 1839

Synonyms
- Boettgeria Peyrot, 1931 (Invalid: junior homonym of Boettgeria Heynemann, 1863; Boettgeriola is a replacement name); Boettgeriola Wenz, 1943; Pleurotoma (Borsonia) Bellardi, 1839

= Borsonia =

Borsonia Temporal range: Eocene to Recent; in California:Upper Pliocene to Recent

Genus of gastropods

Borsonia is a genus of sea snails, marine gastropod mollusks in the family Borsoniidae.

== Description ==
The fusiform shell has medium to small size. It has an elevated spire and a well-marked siphonal canal. The whorls of the spire are usually angulated near the middle. On this angle they show elongated nodes or axial ribs. These nodes disappear almost completely at the last section of the body whorl. The sutures are distinct. The aperture is elongate and is about half as long as the shell. The simple outer lip curves back near the top and forms a deep notch. The columella is nearly straight and has none, one or two strong plications on the upper half. The anal sinus of the outer lip is not deep The sinus area between and the strong sutural cord are well excavated. There is an opening in the infrasutural depression of the body whorl.

== Distribution ==
At considerable depths in the subtropical and temperate waters of the Pacific Ocean and the Atlantic Ocean; in shallower boreal waters.

== Species ==
Species within the genus Borsonia include:

- †Borsonia aguilae C. W. Cook, 1928
- †Borsonia allonsensis Boussac, 1911
- †Borsonia balteata Tate, 1898
- †Borsonia bilineata Koenen, 1890
- †Borsonia binodosa Koenen, 1885
- Borsonia brasiliana Tippett, 1983
- †Borsonia britanna Cossmann, 1896
- †Borsonia castellanensis Boussac, 1911
- †Borsonia castellorum Oppenheim, 1901
- †Borsonia centrema de Ryckholt, 1862
- Borsonia ceroplasta (R. B. Watson, 1881)
- †Borsonia chaputi Delpey, 1938
- Borsonia clarkae Y. Zheng & S. J. Maxwell, 2026
- †Borsonia clifdenensis H. J. Finlay, 1930
- †Borsonia coarctata Koenen, 1865
- †Borsonia coemansi Briart & Cornet, 1870
- †Borsonia columnata De Gregorio, 1880
- †Borsonia costulata Koenen, 1890
- †Borsonia crassiaxialis P. A. Maxwell, 1992
- †Borsonia duilii De Gregorio, 1880
- †Borsonia elongata C.-H. Hu & X.-F. Lee, 1991
- †Borsonia eocenica D. C. Long, 1981
- Borsonia epigona E. von Martens, 1901
- †Borsonia fasciata Giebel, 1864
- †Borsonia fera De Gregorio, 1880
- †Borsonia germeraadi K. Martin, 1933
- Borsonia hirondelleae (Dautzenberg, 1891)
- †Borsonia indica (Tesch, 1915)
- Borsonia jaffa Cotton, 1947
- Borsonia jaya Sysoev, 1997
- †Borsonia laevis Foresti, 1887
- †Borsonia lugensis Fuchs, 1870
- †Borsonia meridionalis Lozouet, 2017
- †Borsonia mitrata Briart & Cornet, 1870
- †Borsonia mitromorphoides Suter, 1917
- †Borsonia miyazakiensis Shuto, 1961
- Borsonia nipponensis (Okutani & Iwahori, 1992)
- †Borsonia obscura Ryckholt, 1862
- Borsonia ochracea Thiele, 1925
- †Borsonia ombonii De Gregorio, 1880
- †Borsonia pelaezae Vera-Peláez, 2022
- †Borsonia plioalboranensis Vera-Peláez, 2002
- †Borsonia praecostulata Vinassa de Regny, 1898
- †Borsonia prima Bellardi, 1839
- †Borsonia rembangensis Pannekoek, 1936
- †Borsonia rotundata K. Martin, 1935
- Borsonia saccoi Dall, 1908
- †Borsonia sativa De Gregorio, 1890
- †Borsonia shimajiriensis MacNeil, 1961
- Borsonia silicea (R. B. Watson, 1881)
- Borsonia smithi Schepman, 1913
- Borsonia symbiophora Sysoev, 1996
- Borsonia symbiotes (Wood-Mason & Alcock, 1891)
- Borsonia syngenes (R. B. Watson, 1881)
- †Borsonia tatei A. W. B. Powell, 1944
- Borsonia timorensis (Schepman, 1913)
- †Borsonia torquayensis A. W. B. Powell, 1944
- †Borsonia zelandica (P. Marshall, 1919)

Species brought into synonymy

- Borsonia agassizii Dall, 1908 : synonym of Borsonella agassizii (Dall, 1908)
- Borsonia bifasciata Pease, 1860 : synonym of Kermidaphnella bifasciata (Pease, 1860)
- † Borsonia brachyspira Suter, 1917: synonym of † Mitromorpha brachyspira (Suter, 1917)
- Borsonia coronadoi Dall, 1908: synonym of Borsonella coronadoi (Dall, 1908)
- Borsonia crassicostata Pease, 1860: synonym of Lienardia crassicostata (Pease, 1860)
- Borsonia diegensis Dall, 1908 : synonym of Borsonella diegensis (Dall, 1908)
- † Borsonia inculta Moody, 1916: synonym of Pseudotaranis strongi (Arnold, 1903)
- Borsonia lutea Pease, 1860: synonym of Kermia lutea (Pease, 1860)
- Borsonia nebulosa Pease, 1860 synonym of Pseudodaphnella nebulosa (Pease, 1860)
- Borsonia rouaultii Dall, 1889: synonym of Cordieria rouaultii (Dall, 1889)
