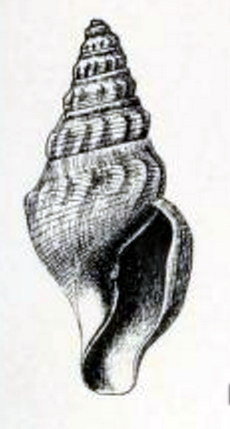
- Drawing of a shell of Borsonella erosina

Scientific classification
- Kingdom: Animalia
- Phylum: Mollusca
- Class: Gastropoda
- Subclass: Caenogastropoda
- Order: Neogastropoda
- Superfamily: Conoidea
- Family: Borsoniidae
- Genus: Borsonella; Dall, 1908

Type species
- Borsonia dalli Dall, 1908

Synonyms
- Spirotropis (Borsonella) Dall, 1908

= Borsonella =

Genus of gastropods

Borsonella is a genus of sea snails, marine gastropod mollusks in the family Borsoniidae.

== Description ==
(Original description) The shell has a small, blunt nucleus of one or two whorls. The sculpture is chiefly spiral, feeble, except for one or two spiral carinae, sometimes with a few small riblets or beads on the principal carina. The periostracum is conspicuous, smooth or vermiculate. The siphonal canal is wide and very short. The outer lip is sharp, simple, arcuate. The columella is solid, with one strong, nearly horizontal plait continuous upon the whole axis. This axis is impervious, the operculum absent. Type Borsonia dalli

There is never more than one plait in Borsonella; in Cordieria Rouault, 1848, as restricted by Cossmann, there are never less than two. In Rouaultia the anal sulcus is narrow, sharp, and situated at the shoulder in the peripheral carina. Both Cordieria and typical Borsonia have a long and slender canal and the general aspect of Gemmula Weinkauff, 1875, while Borsonella resembles an Antiplanes Dall, 1902 with a strong plait on the proximal part of the columella.

== Species ==
Species within the genus Borsonella include:

- Borsonella abrupta McLean & Poorman, 1971
- Borsonella agassizii (Dall, 1908)
- Borsonella barbarensis Dall, 1919
- Borsonella bartschi (Arnold, 1903)
- Borsonella callicesta (Dall, 1902)
- Borsonella coronadoi (Dall, 1908)
- Borsonella diegensis (Dall, 1908)
- Borsonella erosina (Dall, 1908)
- Borsonella galapagana McLean & Poorman, 1971
- Borsonella hooveri (Arnold, 1903)
- Borsonella merriami (Arnold, 1903)
- Borsonella omphale Dall, 1919
- Borsonella pinosensis Bartsch, 1944
- † Borsonella sinelirata Marwick, 1931

Species brought into synonymy

- Borsonella angelena Hanna, 1924: synonym of Borsonella omphale Dall, 1919
- Borsonella civitella Dall, 1919: synonym of Borsonella bartschi (Arnold, 1903)
- Borsonella nicoli Dall, 1919: synonym of Borsonella bartschi (Arnold, 1903)
- Borsonella nychia Dall, 1919: synonym of Borsonella coronadoi (Dall, 1908)
- Borsonella rhodope Dall, 1919: synonym of Rhodopetoma diaulax (Dall, 1908)
