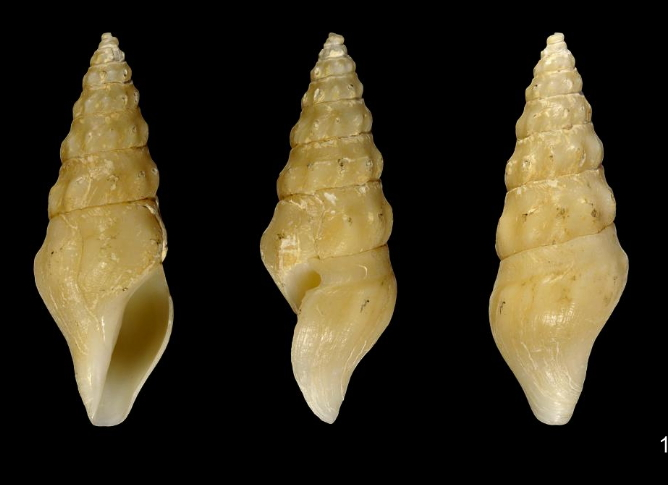
- Shell of Borsonella bartschi (holotype at Smithsonian Institution)

Scientific classification
- Kingdom: Animalia
- Phylum: Mollusca
- Class: Gastropoda
- Subclass: Caenogastropoda
- Order: Neogastropoda
- Superfamily: Conoidea
- Family: Borsoniidae
- Genus: Borsonella
- Species: B. bartschi

Binomial name
- Borsonella bartschi (Arnold, 1903)

Synonyms
- Borsonella civitella Dall, 1919; Borsonella nicoli Dall, 1919; Pleurotoma (Borsonia) bartschi Arnold, 1903 (basionym); Pleurotoma bartschi Arnold, 1903 (original combination)

= Borsonella bartschi =

Species of gastropod

Borsonella bartschi is a species of sea snail, a marine gastropod mollusk in the family Borsoniidae.

== Description ==
The solid shell is white, covered with a pale straw-colored periostracum. It contains eight whorls exclusive of the (lost) nucleus. The suture is distinct with a slightly swollen margin. The axial sculpture consists of (on the penultimate whorl about nine) nodular ribs, peripheral on the spire, becoming obsolete on the body whorl, beginning in front of the fasciole and obscure beyond the periphery. The spiral sculpture consists of fine striae, visible only in occasional spots. The fasciole is somewhat constricted. Beside this there are faint traces of vermicular sculpture visible under a glass, reminiscent of the sculpture in Borsonella barbarensis. The aperture is narrow. The anal sulcus is moderately deep. The thin outer lip is arcuate. The body and the columella are smooth. The plait is hidden behind the columella which is attenuate in front. The siphonal canal is short and wide.

The height of shell attains 22 mm; of the body whorl: 13 mm: diameter: 8 mm.

== Distribution ==
This species occurs in the Pacific Ocean off Santa Barbara Island, California.
