= Borsonia cliffdenensis =

Scientific classification
- Kingdom: Animalia
- Phylum: Mollusca
- Class: Gastropoda
- Subclass: Caenogastropoda
- Order: Neogastropoda
- Superfamily: Conoidea
- Family: Borsoniidae
- Genus: Borsonia
- Species: B. cliffdenensis

Binomial name
- Borsonia cliffdenensis H. Finlay, 1930

Extinct species of gastropod

Borsonia cliffdenensis is an extinct species of sea snail, a marine gastropod mollusk in the family Borsoniidae.

== Distribution ==
This extinct marine species was endemic to New Zealand.
