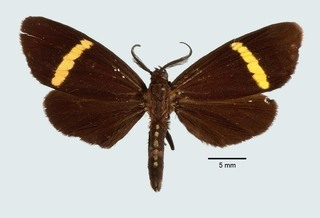

Scientific classification
- Kingdom: Animalia
- Phylum: Arthropoda
- Clade: Pancrustacea
- Class: Insecta
- Order: Lepidoptera
- Superfamily: Noctuoidea
- Family: Notodontidae
- Genus: Ephialtias
- Species: E. dorsispilota

Binomial name
- Ephialtias dorsispilota Warren, 1905

= Ephialtias dorsispilota =

Species of moth

Ephialtias dorsispilota is a moth of the family Notodontidae. It is found from Panama and Costa Rica to Colombia.

Larvae have been recorded on Lindackeria laurina.
