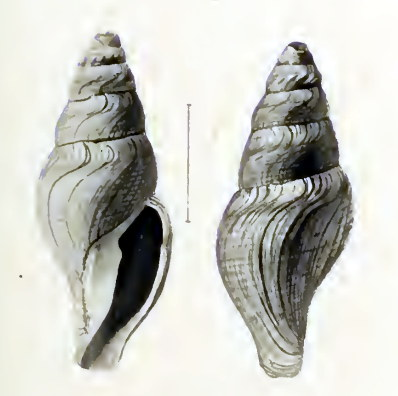
- Original images of a shell of Borsonia smithi

Scientific classification
- Kingdom: Animalia
- Phylum: Mollusca
- Class: Gastropoda
- Subclass: Caenogastropoda
- Order: Neogastropoda
- Superfamily: Conoidea
- Family: Borsoniidae
- Genus: Borsonia
- Species: B. smithi

Binomial name
- Borsonia smithi Schepman, 1913

= Borsonia smithi =

Species of gastropod

Borsonia smithi is a species of sea snail, a marine gastropod mollusk in the family Borsoniidae.

== Description ==
The height of the shell attains 18 mm.

(Original description) The rather thick shell has a fusiform shape and is yellowish-white. The upper whorls are lost by erosion. Of the remaining 6 whorls the upper ones are still eroded, of the 4 whorls which are in sufficient state of preservation, the upper 2 are slightly angular, their upper part a little excavated, the lower part more convex, with a single row of nodules on the limit. In the lower ones the shell is slightly excavated below the suture, but otherwise regularly rounded, without nodules. The sculpture consists of numerous arcuate striae, with stronger ones at intervals, indicating the margin of the sinus at former periods, and very faint traces of spiral striae in the excavation of the upper whorls, lower part of each whorl is sculptured with very fine growth-striae, likewise stronger at intervals and rather weak spiral lirae, of which there are 2 below the angle of the upper sculptured whorl, 2 or 3 on the next, 5 on penultimate and numerous ones on the body whorl. This latter is regularly attenuated towards the base and runs in the rather long, large canal, which in its basal part is free from lirae and only sculptured by fine and groovelike growth-lines. The aperture is angularly ovate, with a moderately sharp angle above, ending below in a rather wide, slightly contorted siphonal canal. The peristome is a little broken, probably rather thick, with a wide, rather shallow sinus above, then regularly arched. The columellar margin is concave at the upper part, along the body whorl, then thickened, with an obtuse, oblique fold at the upper part of this thicker one, directed to the left below, along the siphonal canal. The interior of the aperture is smooth, white, the whole columellar side with a strong layer of enamel.

== Distribution ==
This marine species occurs off Indonesia.
