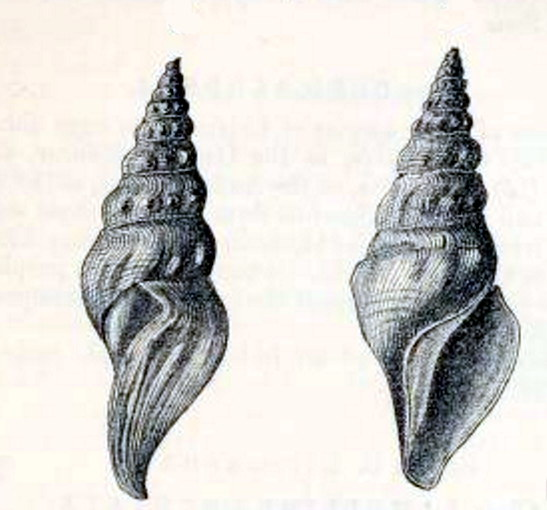
- Original drawing of two shells of Borsonia symbiotes

Scientific classification
- Kingdom: Animalia
- Phylum: Mollusca
- Class: Gastropoda
- Subclass: Caenogastropoda
- Order: Neogastropoda
- Superfamily: Conoidea
- Family: Borsoniidae
- Genus: Borsonia
- Species: B. symbiotes

Binomial name
- Borsonia symbiotes (Wood-Mason & Alcock, 1891)

Synonyms
- Benthovoluta nakayasui Habe, 1976; Comitas symbiotes (Wood-Mason & Alcock, 1891); Pleurotoma symbiotes Wood-Mason & Alcock, 1891 (original combination); Surcula symbiotes (Wood-Mason & Alcock, 1891)

= Borsonia symbiotes =

Species of gastropod

Borsonia symbiotes is a species of sea snail, a marine gastropod mollusk in the family Borsoniidae.

== Description ==
The height of the shell attains 70 mm. The shell is remarkable for its peculiar glistening white outer layer, with which it is most beautifully contrasted the pale cinnamon interior.

== Distribution ==
This marine species occurs off the Laccadives and off East India, Malaya and Indonesia.
