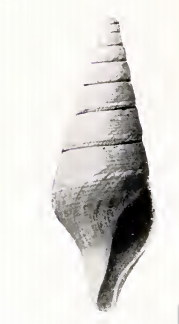
- Original image of the shell of Borsonella omphale

Scientific classification
- Kingdom: Animalia
- Phylum: Mollusca
- Class: Gastropoda
- Subclass: Caenogastropoda
- Order: Neogastropoda
- Superfamily: Conoidea
- Family: Borsoniidae
- Genus: Borsonella
- Species: B. omphale

Binomial name
- Borsonella omphale Dall, 1919

Synonyms
- Borsonella angelena Hanna, 1924; Pleurotoma (Borsonia) dalli Arnold, 1903; Pleurotoma dalli Arnold, 1903 (invalid: junior homonym of Pleurotoma dalli Verrill & Smith, 1882; Borsonella angelena is a replacement name); Spirotropis (Borsonella) omphalis (Dall, 1919)

= Borsonella omphale =

Species of gastropod

Borsonella omphale is a species of sea snail, a marine gastropod mollusk in the family Borsoniidae.

== Description ==
The slender shell is acute, with eight flattish whorls exclusive of the (lost) nucleus. Its color is white covered by a very light olive gray periostracum. The suture is distinct. The fasciole is hardly impressed. The spiral sculpture consists of obscure striae, sparser on the base. The axial sculpture consists of incremental faint lines arcuate on the anal fasciole. The aperture is narrow. The anal sulcus is wide and moderately deep. The outer lip is thin, prominently arcuate in front of the periphery. The inner lip is erased. The columella is strong with a single fold near the body; attenuated in front. The siphonal canal is short.

The height of the shell is 16 mm; of the body whorl: 10 mm; diameter: 6 mm.

== Distribution ==
This species occurs in the Pacific Ocean off Santa Barbara Island, California.
