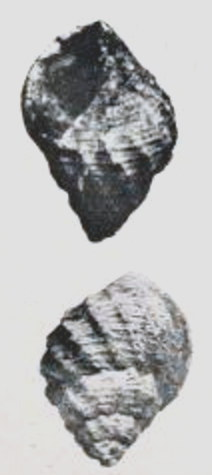
- Two views of a shell of Cordieria ovalis

Scientific classification
- Kingdom: Animalia
- Phylum: Mollusca
- Class: Gastropoda
- Subclass: Caenogastropoda
- Order: Neogastropoda
- Superfamily: Conoidea
- Family: Borsoniidae
- Genus: Cordieria
- Species: C. ovalis

Binomial name
- Cordieria ovalis (P. Marshall, 1917)

Synonyms
- Borsonia (Cordieria) ovalis P. Marshall, 1917 (original combination)

= Cordieria ovalis =

Species of gastropod

Cordieria ovalis is a species of sea snail, a marine gastropod mollusk in the family Borsoniidae.

== Description ==
The size of the shell attains 13 mm, its width 9 mm.

(Original description) The small, oval shall has a short spire consisting of 4 rapidly diminishing whorls. The outline of the whorls is slightly convex. The oval aperture measures rather less than half the length of the shell. The outer lip is thick, the inner lip is not callous. The columella shows 3 distinct folds. The aperture is obtuse anteriorly. Each whorl has about 15 radial costae slightly raised and continuous from suture to suture. These costae are turned slightly backward. A number of sharp spiral threads, which, however, are interrupted, on the costae. The suture is impressed and not bordered. On the body whorl the costae decrease anteriorly, and are not distinct on the base. Many of the spiral threads, however, continue into the aperture. This shell, owing to the coarseness of its sculpture, has a somewhat rude appearance, and is very characteristic. The holotype is kept at the Wanganui Museum.

== Distribution ==
This marine species is endemic for New Zealand.
