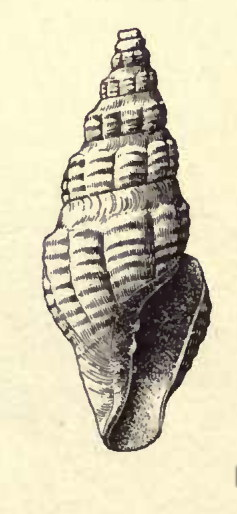
- Cordieria rouaultii

Scientific classification
- Kingdom: Animalia
- Phylum: Mollusca
- Class: Gastropoda
- Subclass: Caenogastropoda
- Order: Neogastropoda
- Superfamily: Conoidea
- Family: Borsoniidae
- Genus: Cordieria; Rouault, 1848

Type species
- † Cordieria iberica Rouault, 1848

= Cordieria =

Cordieria Temporal range: Cretaceous to Recent

Genus of gastropods

Cordieria is a genus of sea snails, marine gastropod mollusks in the family Borsoniidae.

This genus is considered by the French malacologist Maurice Cossmann separate from Borsonia, not on the basis of the columellar plaits alone, but mostly because of the shorter siphonal canal and a number of other characteristics that he enumerates.

== Species ==
Species within the genus Borsonia include:

- † Cordieria fuscoamnica Darragh, 2017
- Cordieria horrida Monterosato, 1884
- † Cordieria iberica Rouault, 1848
- Cordieria ovalis P. Marshall, 1917
- Cordieria pupoides Monterosato, 1884
- Cordieria rouaultii (Dall, 1889)
- † Cordieria torquata Darragh, 2017

Species brought into synonymy

- Cordieria cordieri var. hispida Monterosato, 1890: synonym of Raphitoma hispidella Riccardo Giannuzzi-Savelli, Francesco Pusateri, Stefano Bartolini, 2019
- † Cordieria haasti Finlay, 1930: synonym of † Cordieria rudis (Hutton, 1885)
- † Cordieria verrucosa Finlay, 1930: synonym of † Cordieria rudis (Hutton, 1885)
