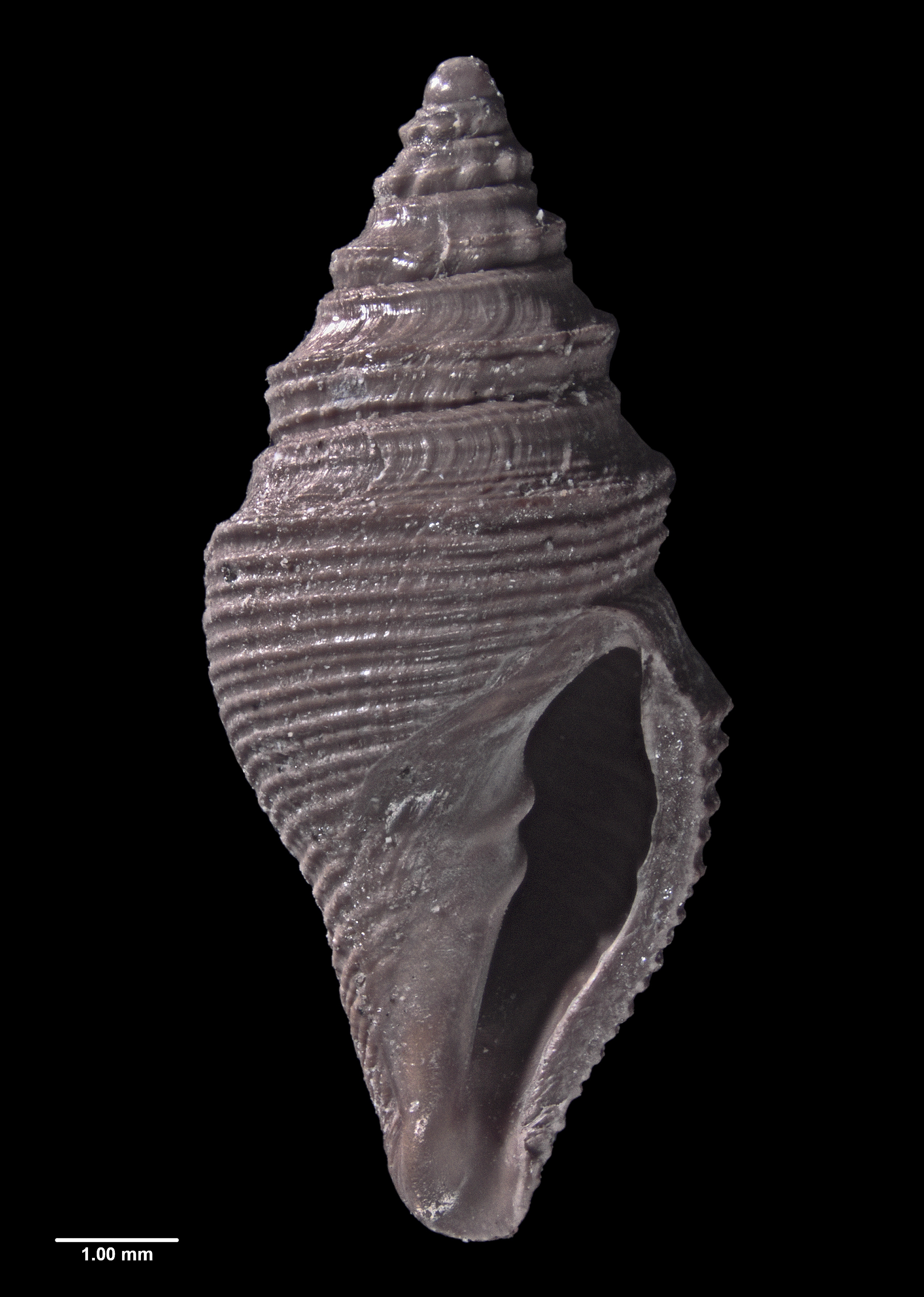
- Holotype from Auckland War Memorial Museum

Scientific classification
- Kingdom: Animalia
- Phylum: Mollusca
- Class: Gastropoda
- Subclass: Caenogastropoda
- Order: Neogastropoda
- Family: Borsoniidae
- Genus: Borsonia
- Species: †B. torquayensis

Binomial name
- †Borsonia torquayensis A. W. B. Powell, 1944

= Borsonia torquayensis =

Borsonia torquayensis Temporal range: late Oligocene

Extinct species of gastropod

Borsonia torquayensis is an extinct species of sea snail, a marine gastropod mollusc, in the family Borsoniidae. Fossils of the species date to late Oligocene strata of the Port Phillip Basin of Victoria, Australia.

== Description ==
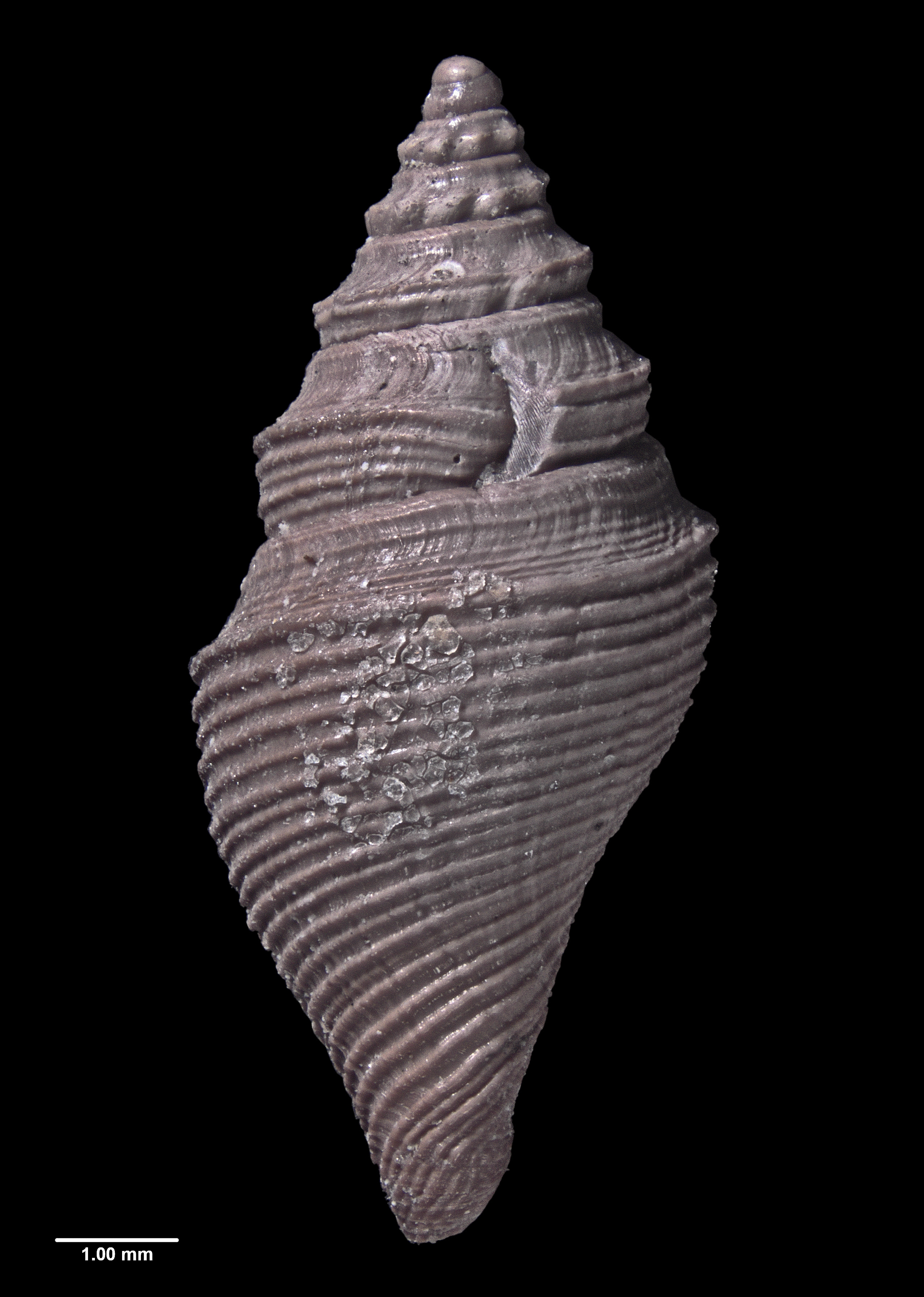
Reverse view of holotype

In the original description, Powell described the species as follows:

Shell small, stout, biconic, sharply medially carinated and sculptured with distinct, sharp spiral cords. Only the first two penultimate whorls bear small peripheral tubercles. Shoulder broadly and shallowly concave, smooth except for a few very indistinct spiral threads. Two distinct closely spaced spiral threads submargin the upper suture. Below the carina on the spire-whorls there are strong narrow cords, one on antepenultimate and two to four on the later whorls. Below the carina to the anterior end of the body-whorl there are 24 sharply raised, narrow spiral cords. About the middle of pillar there are two strong plaits. The species approaches balteata, from which it is distinguished by the reduced axial sculpture and weaker subsutural margining.

The holotype of the species measures 9.8 mm (0.39 in) in height and has a diameter of 4.45 mm (0.175 in). The body whorl is tumid, and the siphonal canal is short and wide.

== Taxonomy ==
The species was first described by A. W. B. Powell in 1944. The holotype was collected prior to 1944 from Torquay, Victoria, Australia. It is a part of the H. J. Finlay Collection, which is held by the Auckland War Memorial Museum.

== Distribution ==
This extinct marine species occurs in late Oligocene strata of the Port Phillip Basin of Victoria, Australia, including the Jan Juc Formation.
