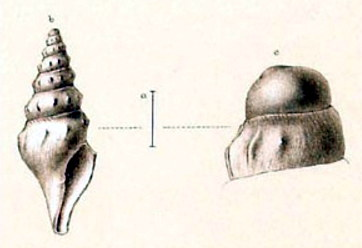
- Original image of a shell of Borsonia ceroplasta

Scientific classification
- Kingdom: Animalia
- Phylum: Mollusca
- Class: Gastropoda
- Subclass: Caenogastropoda
- Order: Neogastropoda
- Superfamily: Conoidea
- Family: Borsoniidae
- Genus: Borsonia
- Species: B. ceroplasta

Binomial name
- Borsonia ceroplasta (Watson, 1881)

Synonyms
- Borsonella ceroplasta (Watson, 1881); Pleurotoma ceroplasta Watson, 1881 (original combination)

= Borsonia ceroplasta =

Species of gastropod

Borsonia ceroplasta is a species of sea snail, a marine gastropod mollusk in the family Borsoniidae.

== Description ==
The size of the shell attains 13 mm.

(Original description) Shell.—The high, narrow shell has a biconical shape with a tall blunt spire, a slightly impressed suture, and a shortish base. The whorls are feebly ribbed and very obsoletely spiralled.

Sculpture : there are on the earlier whorls about 12, on the last two whorls about 14 elongated tubercles, which project bluntly and slightly above the middle of the whorls, and are obliquely and feebly produced to the inferior suture. They are obsolete on the base. The surface is closely scratched with fine, somewhat unequal lines of growth.

Spirals—there is a very slight pad which forms an inferior margin to the suture. Below this is a hardly concave furrow, on the lower side of which the whorls are angulated by the projection of the tubercles. The lower part of the whorls is very obsoletely marked with broad flat spiral threads, which may be traced to the tip of the snout.

Colour: pale waxy white, whence the name.

The spire is conical, with profile-lines interrupted by the prominence of the keel, from which both above and below is a contraction into the suture. The apex consists of 2 tumid rounded whorls of nearly equal size, with a very slight suture. There are 8 whorls in all, of slow and regular increase. The body whorl is small, with a rounded conical base and a smallish snout. The whorls are angularly convex, with a slight contraction into the suture, both at top and bottom of the whorls. The suture is a little impressed, rather oblique. The aperture is small and narrow, pear-shaped, scarcely angulated above, and drawn out into a rather narrow siphonal canal in front. The outer lip is regularly curved above and flat in front; the edge retires slightly below the suture, so as to form the deep rather narrow sinus, whose lower side is made by the very high and prominent shoulder, which advances very far forward, and still continues to do so though more slightly on to the edge of the canal, where it again retires to the left. The inner lip has a thin glaze on the body and columella whose union is very slightly concave. The generic fold is a prominent, rounded, narrow thread which coils round the columella about the middle and parallel to the suture. The front of the columella is narrow, twisted, and oblique.

== Distribution ==
This marine species occurs off Puerto Rico; Saint Thomas, U.S. Virgin Islands and the Virgin Islands.
