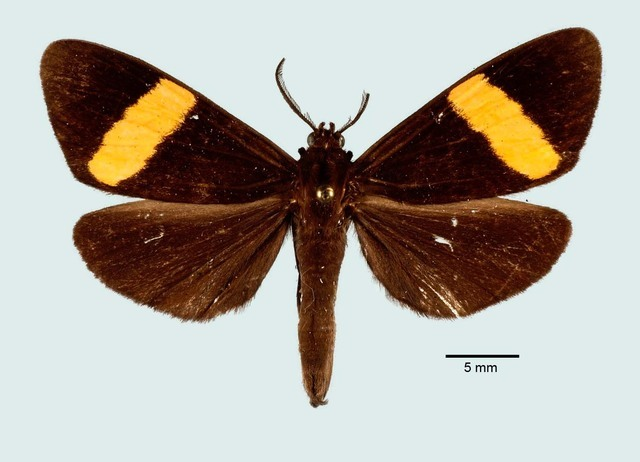

Scientific classification
- Kingdom: Animalia
- Phylum: Arthropoda
- Clade: Pancrustacea
- Class: Insecta
- Order: Lepidoptera
- Superfamily: Noctuoidea
- Family: Notodontidae
- Genus: Ephialtias
- Species: E. velutinum

Binomial name
- Ephialtias velutinum (Butler, 1878)

Synonyms
- Mitradaemon velutinum Butler, 1878

= Ephialtias velutinum =

Species of moth

Ephialtias velutinum is a moth of the family Notodontidae. It is found in upper Amazonia (Manaus westward to Peru and Ecuador).
