= Borsonia brasiliana =

Scientific classification
- Kingdom: Animalia
- Phylum: Mollusca
- Class: Gastropoda
- Subclass: Caenogastropoda
- Order: Neogastropoda
- Superfamily: Conoidea
- Family: Borsoniidae
- Genus: Borsonia
- Species: B. brasiliana

Binomial name
- Borsonia brasiliana Tippett, 1983

Species of gastropod

Borsonia brasiliana is a species of sea snail, a marine gastropod mollusk in the family Borsoniidae.

== Description ==
The size of the shell reaches a length of 10.9-12.2 mm, with a maximum width of 4–5.1 mm. It has a characteristic sinistral coiling of the shell, and its whirl tapers toward its canal.

== Distribution ==
This marine species occurs off Northeast Brazil.
