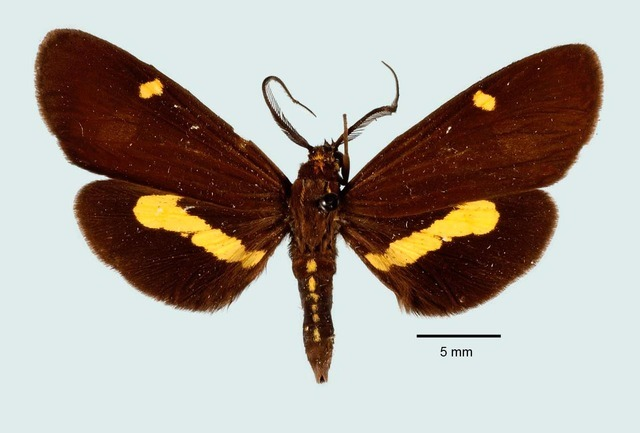

Scientific classification
- Kingdom: Animalia
- Phylum: Arthropoda
- Clade: Pancrustacea
- Class: Insecta
- Order: Lepidoptera
- Superfamily: Noctuoidea
- Family: Notodontidae
- Genus: Ephialtias
- Species: E. choba

Binomial name
- Ephialtias choba (H. Druce, 1899)

Synonyms
- Myonia choba H. Druce, 1899; Actea choba (H. Druce, 1899); Actea transita Hering, 1925

= Ephialtias choba =

Species of moth

Ephialtias choba is a moth of the family Notodontidae first described by Herbert Druce in 1899. It is found in the lower Amazon of Brazil.
