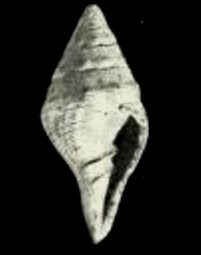
- Original image of a shell of Borsonia mitromorphoides

Scientific classification
- Kingdom: Animalia
- Phylum: Mollusca
- Class: Gastropoda
- Subclass: Caenogastropoda
- Order: Neogastropoda
- Superfamily: Conoidea
- Family: Borsoniidae
- Genus: Borsonia
- Species: B. mitromorphoides

Binomial name
- Borsonia mitromorphoides Suter, 1917

= Borsonia mitromorphoides =

Extinct species of gastropod

Borsonia mitromorphoides is an extinct species of sea snail, a marine gastropod mollusk in the family Borsoniidae.

== Description ==
The height of the shell is 18 mm, its width is 8 mm.

The Shell is moderately large, biconic-fusiform, imperforate, slightly turreted, with a very broad smooth shoulder, spirally striated below it. The axial ribs are rather inconspicuous. The columella has two very distinct plaits. The siphonal canal is narrow, nearly of the same height as the aperture.

Sculpture: The indistinctly turreted whorls have a broad shoulder showing deeply curved growth-lines. Below the faint angle there are short axial costae which are very little raised and broadly convex, about 10 on a whorl. On the body whorl they are very oblique, and vanish on the lower half. The axials are knobby and squarish on the spire whorls. They are crossed on the spire by five fine spiral threads, and the whole of the body whorl is spirally lirate. Oblique curved growth-lines are distinctly visible. The spire is conical, of nearly the same height as the aperture with siphonal canal. The outlines are straight with an angle of 50°. The protoconch is broken off, but evidently very small. The shell contains six whorls without the protoconch, first slowly then more rapidly descending, angled at the lower third, the broad shoulder slightly concave. The body whorl is convex below the angle and contracted at the base. The suture is well impressed, slightly wavy. The aperture is very narrowly pear-shaped, lightly channelled above, gradually narrowing below into a comparatively long, narrow, and open siphonal canal, its base truncated. The outer lip is damaged, convex above, very faintly excavated further down. The columella is slightly oblique, with two well-pronounced oblique plaits at the middle, very faintly deflected towards the canal. The inner lip is thin and narrow.

== Distribution ==
This extinct marine species was endemic to New Zealand and was found in Miocene strata.
