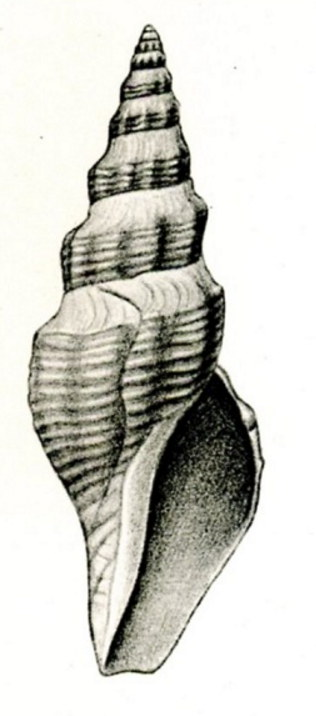
- Original image of a shell of Borsonia ochracea

Scientific classification
- Kingdom: Animalia
- Phylum: Mollusca
- Class: Gastropoda
- Subclass: Caenogastropoda
- Order: Neogastropoda
- Superfamily: Conoidea
- Family: Borsoniidae
- Genus: Borsonia
- Species: B. ochracea

Binomial name
- Borsonia ochracea Thiele, 1925

= Borsonia ochracea =

Species of gastropod

Borsonia ochracea is a species of sea snail, a marine gastropod mollusk in the family Borsoniidae.

== Distribution ==
This marine species occurs off East Africa from Zanzibar to the Gulf of Aden at depths between 693 m and 1644 m.
