= Borsonia zelandica =

Scientific classification
- Kingdom: Animalia
- Phylum: Mollusca
- Class: Gastropoda
- Subclass: Caenogastropoda
- Order: Neogastropoda
- Superfamily: Conoidea
- Family: Borsoniidae
- Genus: Borsonia
- Species: B. zelandica

Binomial name
- Borsonia zelandica (P. Marshall, 1919)

Extinct species of gastropod

Borsonia zelandica is an extinct species of sea snail, a marine gastropod mollusk in the family Borsoniidae.

== Description ==
The spiral ornament consists of four wavy cords between the keel and the lower suture. The suture is margined by a stout swelling. There are 6 to 7 axials per whorl with wider interstices.

== Distribution ==
This extinct marine species was endemic to New Zealand
