= Borsonella galapagana =

Scientific classification
- Kingdom: Animalia
- Phylum: Mollusca
- Class: Gastropoda
- Subclass: Caenogastropoda
- Order: Neogastropoda
- Superfamily: Conoidea
- Family: Borsoniidae
- Genus: Borsonella
- Species: B. galapagana

Binomial name
- Borsonella galapagana McLean & Poorman, 1971

Species of sea snail

Borsonella galapagana is a species of sea snail, a marine gastropod mollusk in the family Borsoniidae.

== Description ==
The shell grows to a length of 15 mm.

== Distribution ==
This species occurs in the Pacific Ocean off the Galapagos Islands.

== Reproduction ==
This Animal's Life Cycle does not include a trochophoric stage.
