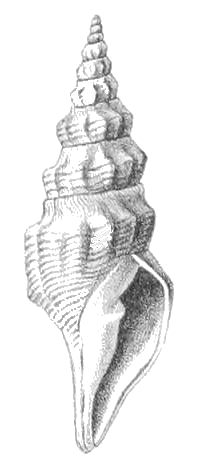
- Original drawing of a shell of Borsonia epigona

Scientific classification
- Kingdom: Animalia
- Phylum: Mollusca
- Class: Gastropoda
- Subclass: Caenogastropoda
- Order: Neogastropoda
- Superfamily: Conoidea
- Family: Borsoniidae
- Genus: Borsonia
- Species: B. epigona

Binomial name
- Borsonia epigona von Martens, 1901

= Borsonia epigona =

Species of gastropod

Borsonia epigona is a species of sea snail, a marine gastropod mollusk in the family Borsoniidae.

== Description ==
This sea snail has a type of shell called a fusiform shell. The size of it can vary, though. The length can vary between 23 mm and 28 mm, and the width can change depending on many things, as most shells are not perfectly sized in some way. The shell of the Borsonia epigona is usually a whitish color, but may vary depending on where you are in the region it is found. The shell is rounded upwards in a spiral, and rough rather that smooth.

== Distribution ==
This marine species occurs off West Sumatra at depths between 614 m and 677 m.
