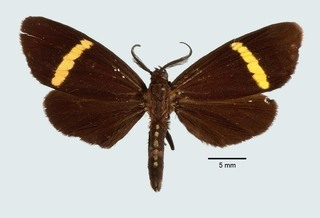
- Ephialtias dorsispilota

Scientific classification
- Kingdom: Animalia
- Phylum: Arthropoda
- Clade: Pancrustacea
- Class: Insecta
- Order: Lepidoptera
- Superfamily: Noctuoidea
- Family: Notodontidae
- Tribe: Josiini
- Genus: Ephialtias; Hübner, 1819

Synonyms
- Actea Walker, 1854 (preocc. Germar, 1842); Mitradaemon Butler, 1878; Retila Boisduval, 1870

= Ephialtias =

Genus of moths

Ephialtias is a genus of moths of the family Notodontidae. It consists of the following species:

- abrupta species group:
  - Ephialtias abrupta (Hübner, 1806)
  - Ephialtias choba (Druce, 1899)
  - Ephialtias consueta (Walker, 1854)
  - Ephialtias dorsispilota Warren, 1905
  - Ephialtias monilis (Hübner, 1806)
  - Ephialtias pseudena (Boisduval, 1870)
  - Ephialtias velutinum (Butler, 1878)
- bryce species group:
  - Ephialtias bryce (Walker, 1854)
  - Ephialtias draconis (Druce, 1885)
  - Ephialtias tenuifascia (Prout, 1918)
