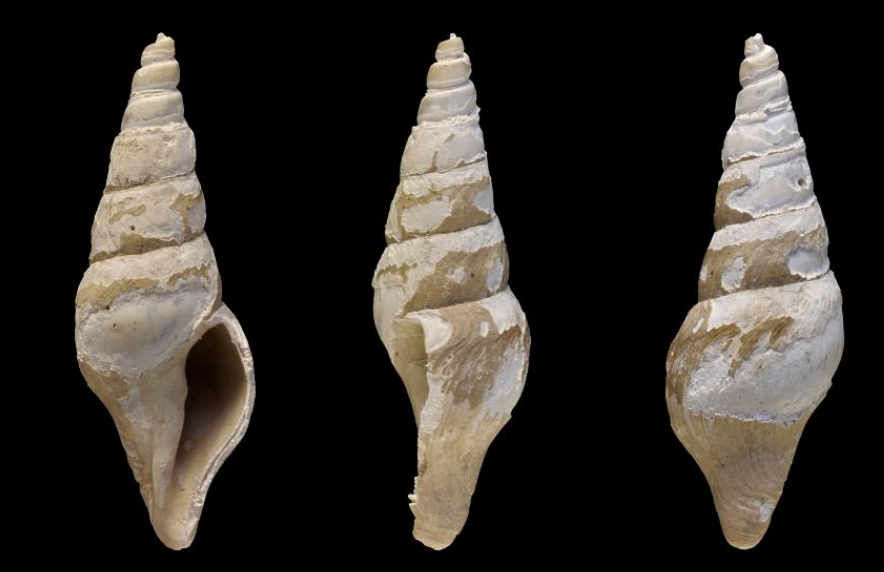
- Shell of Borsonella pinosensis (holotype at the Smithsonian Institution)

Scientific classification
- Kingdom: Animalia
- Phylum: Mollusca
- Class: Gastropoda
- Subclass: Caenogastropoda
- Order: Neogastropoda
- Superfamily: Conoidea
- Family: Borsoniidae
- Genus: Borsonella
- Species: B. pinosensis

Binomial name
- Borsonella pinosensis Bartsch, 1944

= Borsonella pinosensis =

Species of gastropod

Borsonella pinosensis is a species of sea snail, a marine gastropod mollusk in the family Borsoniidae.

== Distribution ==
This species occurs in the Pacific Ocean off California.
