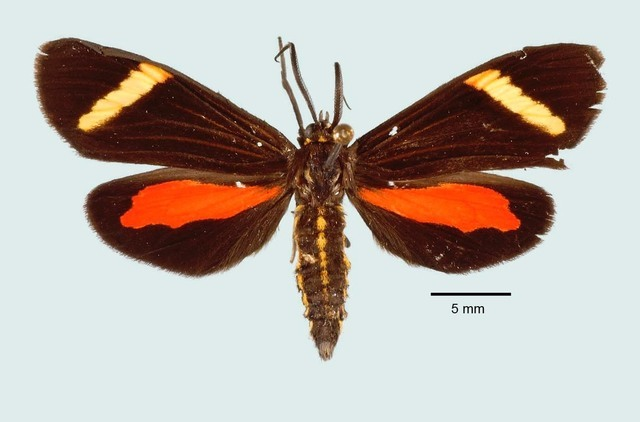

Scientific classification
- Kingdom: Animalia
- Phylum: Arthropoda
- Clade: Pancrustacea
- Class: Insecta
- Order: Lepidoptera
- Superfamily: Noctuoidea
- Family: Notodontidae
- Genus: Ephialtias
- Species: E. tenuifascia

Binomial name
- Ephialtias tenuifascia (Prout, 1918)

Synonyms
- Josia tenuifascia Prout, 1918

= Ephialtias tenuifascia =

Species of moth

Ephialtias tenuifascia is a moth of the family Notodontidae. It is found in Guyana and has also been recorded from Trinidad.
