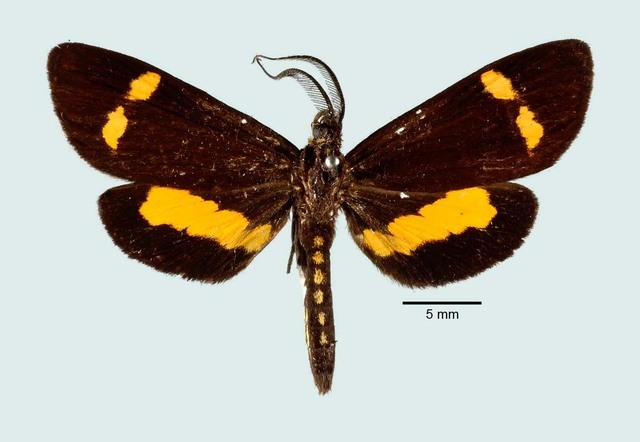

Scientific classification
- Kingdom: Animalia
- Phylum: Arthropoda
- Clade: Pancrustacea
- Class: Insecta
- Order: Lepidoptera
- Superfamily: Noctuoidea
- Family: Notodontidae
- Genus: Ephialtias
- Species: E. monilis

Binomial name
- Ephialtias monilis (Hübner, 1805)

Synonyms
- Hypocrita monilis Hübner, 1805; Hipocrita (Tineiformis) monilis Hübner, [1811]; Actea monilis – Prout, 1918

= Ephialtias monilis =

Species of moth

Ephialtias monilis is a moth of the family Notodontidae. It is widespread and relatively common in upper Amazonia and the Guianas in South America, and reaching Panama (Central America).
