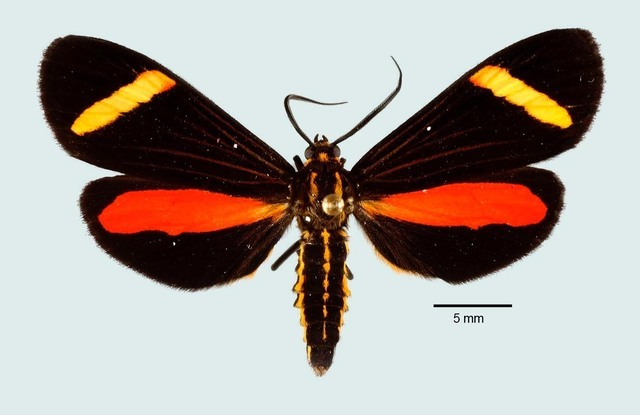

Scientific classification
- Kingdom: Animalia
- Phylum: Arthropoda
- Clade: Pancrustacea
- Class: Insecta
- Order: Lepidoptera
- Superfamily: Noctuoidea
- Family: Notodontidae
- Genus: Ephialtias
- Species: E. draconis

Binomial name
- Ephialtias draconis (H. Druce, 1885)

Synonyms
- Josia draconis (H. Druce, 1885); Actea draconis H. Druce, 1885

= Ephialtias draconis =

Species of moth

Ephialtias draconis is a moth of the family Notodontidae first described by Herbert Druce in 1885. It is found in Panama, and has been recorded from southeastern Peru and northern Bolivia, with few intervening specimens from Colombia or Ecuador.

Larvae have been recorded on Turnera species.
