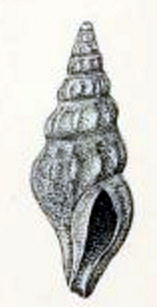
- Original drawing of a shell of Borsonella merriami

Scientific classification
- Kingdom: Animalia
- Phylum: Mollusca
- Class: Gastropoda
- Subclass: Caenogastropoda
- Order: Neogastropoda
- Superfamily: Conoidea
- Family: Borsoniidae
- Genus: Borsonella
- Species: B. merriami

Binomial name
- Borsonella merriami (Arnold, 1903)

Synonyms
- † Drillia merriami Arnold, 1903 (original combination)

= Borsonella merriami =

Species of gastropod

Borsonella merriami is a species of sea snail, a marine gastropod mollusk in the family Borsoniidae.

== Description ==
(Original description) The small, fusiform shell is rather thin. The apex is blunt. The seven whorls are somewhat angular, with about fourteen slightly oblique, prominent, rather sharp transverse ridges. These ridges are most prominent on the angle of the whorl, and become obsolete near the anterior margin and at about one-third width of the whorl from the posterior margin. A narrow sutural band occupies the upper one third of the whorl. Incremental lines are visible. The suture is deeply impressed and distinct. The body whorl is somewhat ventricose and narrowed anteriorly, with transverse ribs sometimes obsolete. The aperture is broadly elliptical, narrowed anteriorly to a prominent sinus. The posterior sinus is small, near the suture. The thin outer lip is arcuate. The columella is smooth.

Dimensions: Length. 14.2 mm.; width: 5.2 mm.; body whorl 7.6 mm.; aperture, including siphonal canal, 6 mm.; siphonal canal 1.5 mm.

== Distribution ==
This fossil species is rare in Pliocene and lower San Pedro series of Deadman Island. The specimen figured is the type, which is from the lower San Pedro series at Deadman Island (California).
