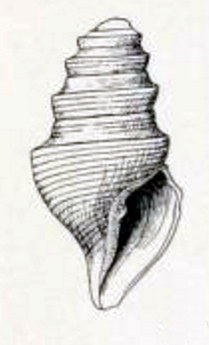
- Drawing of a shell of Borsonella hooveri

Scientific classification
- Kingdom: Animalia
- Phylum: Mollusca
- Class: Gastropoda
- Subclass: Caenogastropoda
- Order: Neogastropoda
- Superfamily: Conoidea
- Family: Borsoniidae
- Genus: Borsonella
- Species: B. hooveri

Binomial name
- Borsonella hooveri (Arnold, 1903)

Synonyms
- † Pleurotoma (Borsonia) hooveri Arnold, 1903 (basionym); Pleurotoma hooveri Arnold, 1903 (original combination)

= Borsonella hooveri =

Extinct species of gastropod

Borsonella hooveri is an extinct species of sea snail, a marine gastropod mollusk in the family Borsoniidae.

== Description ==
The length of the (decollate) shell, 14.7 mm; of body whorl, 10 mm; of aperture, 7–5 mm; max. diam. 8 mm.

The small shell is chalky-white, covered with a polished olive-gray periostracum. The apex is eroded, leaving indications of about six whorls. The general form of the shell is biconic with a single sharp keel at the shoulder, between which and the suture the whorl is more or less excavated. The suture is distinct, the margin in front of it is turgid, giving an effect as if minutely channelled. The excavated area forming the anal fasciole shows arcuate growth lines, crossed by about six faint incised distant spiral lines. The keel somewhat above the periphery, shows a rounded and somewhat compressed edge without waves or nodulations. The surface in front of the keel is moderately convex, spirally sculptured by obsolete distant lines crossed by fine irregular slightly elevated incremental lines, which, in spots, produce a vermiculate aspect. The base of the shell is a little constricted behind the short, nearly straight, attenuated cana. The; body shows a wash of callus. The outer lip has a wide, moderately deep, rounded anal sulcus. In front of the keel it is markedly protractive, thin and simple. The columella is straight, moderately callous, with a single strong almost horizontal plait near its insertion, anteriorly obliquely truncate, twisted, not pervious. The siphonal canal is very short.

== Distribution ==
This fossil species occurs in the Pleistocene of San Pedro, California.
