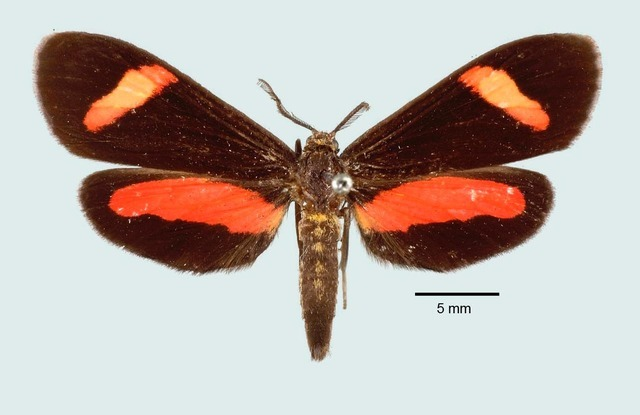

Scientific classification
- Kingdom: Animalia
- Phylum: Arthropoda
- Clade: Pancrustacea
- Class: Insecta
- Order: Lepidoptera
- Superfamily: Noctuoidea
- Family: Notodontidae
- Genus: Ephialtias
- Species: E. bryce

Binomial name
- Ephialtias bryce (Walker, 1854)

Synonyms
- Josia bryce Walker, 1854; Josia rosea Hering, 1925; Josia subdraconis Bryk, 1953

= Ephialtias bryce =

Species of moth

Ephialtias bryce is a moth of the family Notodontidae. It is endemic to the basin of the Rio Tapajos in Brazil.
