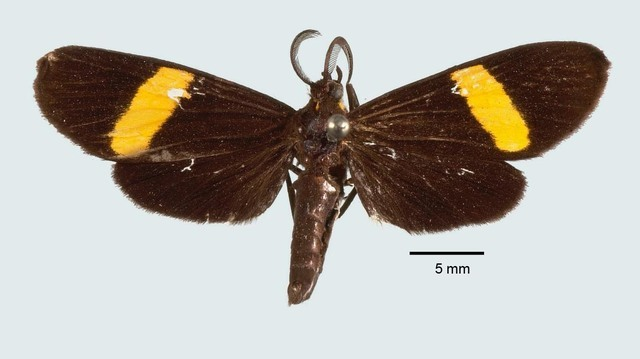

Scientific classification
- Kingdom: Animalia
- Phylum: Arthropoda
- Clade: Pancrustacea
- Class: Insecta
- Order: Lepidoptera
- Superfamily: Noctuoidea
- Family: Notodontidae
- Genus: Ephialtias
- Species: E. pseudena

Binomial name
- Ephialtias pseudena (Boisduval, 1870)

Synonyms
- Mitradaemon pseudena (Boisduval, 1870); Retila pseudena Boisduval, 1870; Josia cassa Prout, 1918

= Ephialtias pseudena =

Species of moth

Ephialtias pseudena is a moth of the family Notodontidae. It is found in Panama and the Magdalena Valley of Colombia.
