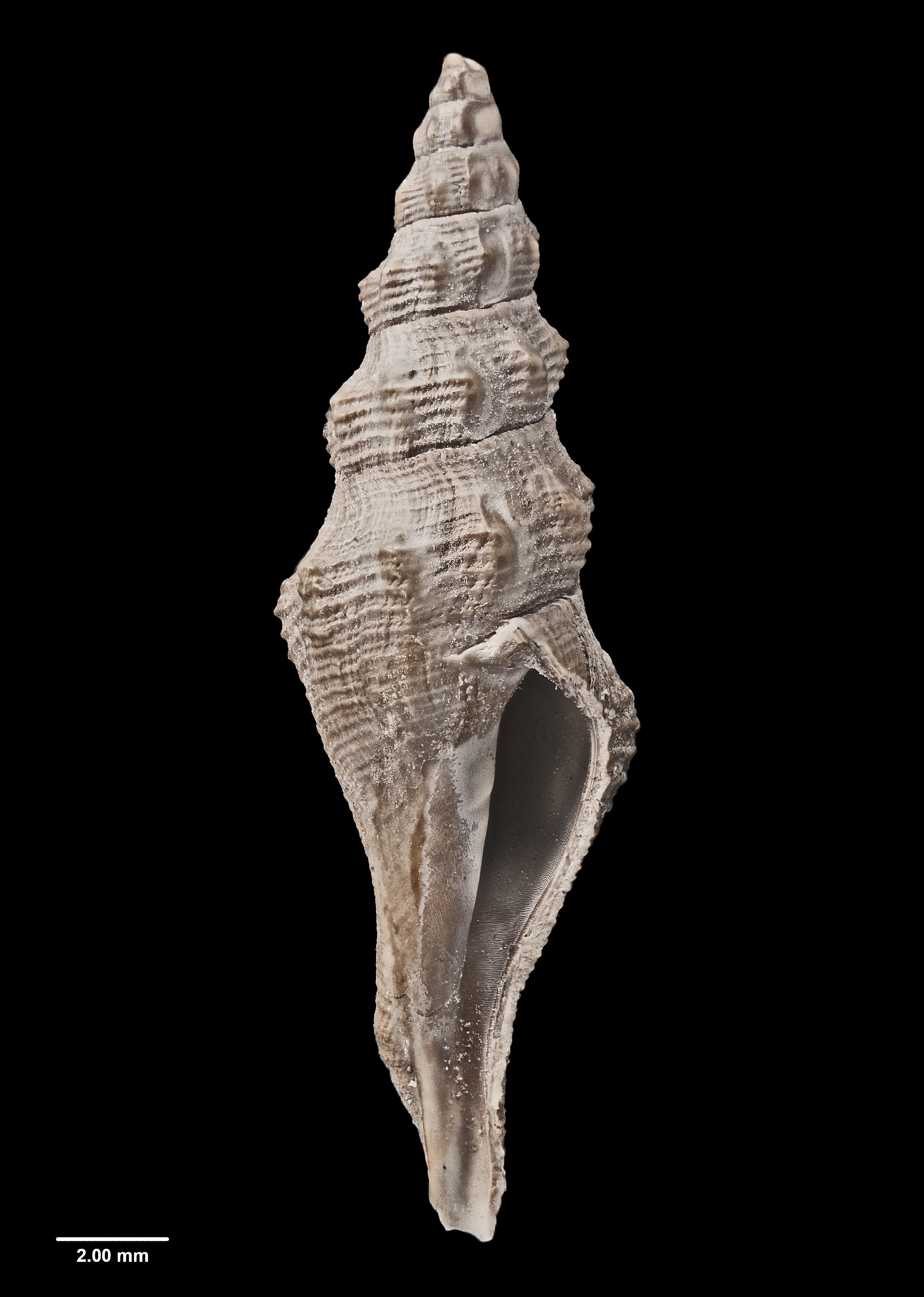
- Holotype from Auckland War Memorial Museum

Scientific classification
- Kingdom: Animalia
- Phylum: Mollusca
- Class: Gastropoda
- Subclass: Caenogastropoda
- Order: Neogastropoda
- Family: Borsoniidae
- Genus: Borsonia
- Species: †B. tatei

Binomial name
- †Borsonia tatei A. W. B. Powell, 1944

Synonyms
- Borsonia tatei tatei A. W. B. Powell, 1944

= Borsonia tatei =

Borsonia tatei Temporal range: early Miocene

Extinct species of gastropod

Borsonia tatei is an extinct species of sea snail, a marine gastropod mollusc, in the family Borsoniidae. Fossils of the species date to early Miocene strata of the Port Phillip Basin of Victoria, Australia.

== Description ==
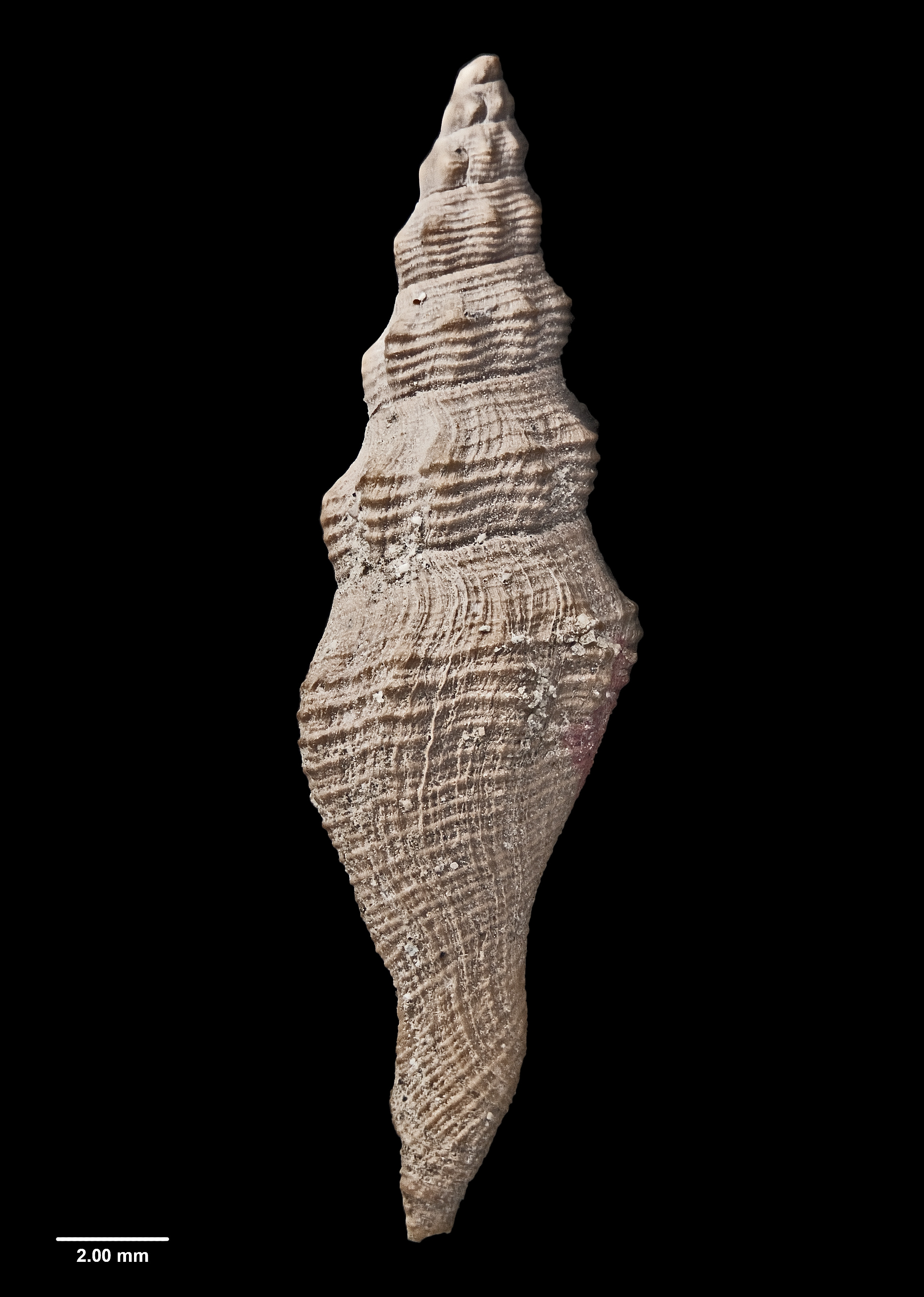
Reverse view of holotype

In the original description, Powell described the species as follows:

Species elongate-fusiform, differing from otwayensis in being more slender and with more numerous, slightly spinose axials, which persist over all post-nuclear whorls. Whorls angled at the middle. Axials strong, pointed at periphery, rapidly fading out on shoulder and considerably diminished at lower suture. Surface crowded with fine spiral threads and moderately strong cords, roughened by a surface texture resultant from dense axial growth lines. Shoulder with from 4-9 fine spiral threads. Five rather strong flat-topped spiral cords from periphery to lower suture, Interspaces slightly greater than width of cords; each interspace on last whorl develops a fine spiral thread. Spirals on base and neck linear-spaced, numerous, and much weaker than those on spire-whorls. Only one pillar plait showing, at about two-thirds height of aperture.

The holotype of the species measures 21.7 mm (0.85 in) in height and has a diameter of 6.75 mm (0.266 in). It differs from B. eocenica due to having cords and threads which are narrower or equal to the shell interspaces (wider in B. eocenica).

== Taxonomy ==
The species was first described by A. W. B. Powell in 1944. The holotype was collected prior to 1944 from Torquay, Victoria, Australia. It is a part of the H. J. Finlay Collection which is held by the Auckland War Memorial Museum.

In 1981, D. C. Long proposed a subspecies, Borsonia tatei eocenica, to describe similar appearance fossils dating to the late Eocene of the Otway Basin, which by 1985 was being treated as its own species, Borsonia eocenica.

== Distribution ==
This extinct marine species occurs in early Miocene strata of the Port Phillip Basin of Victoria, Australia, including the Puebla Formation.
