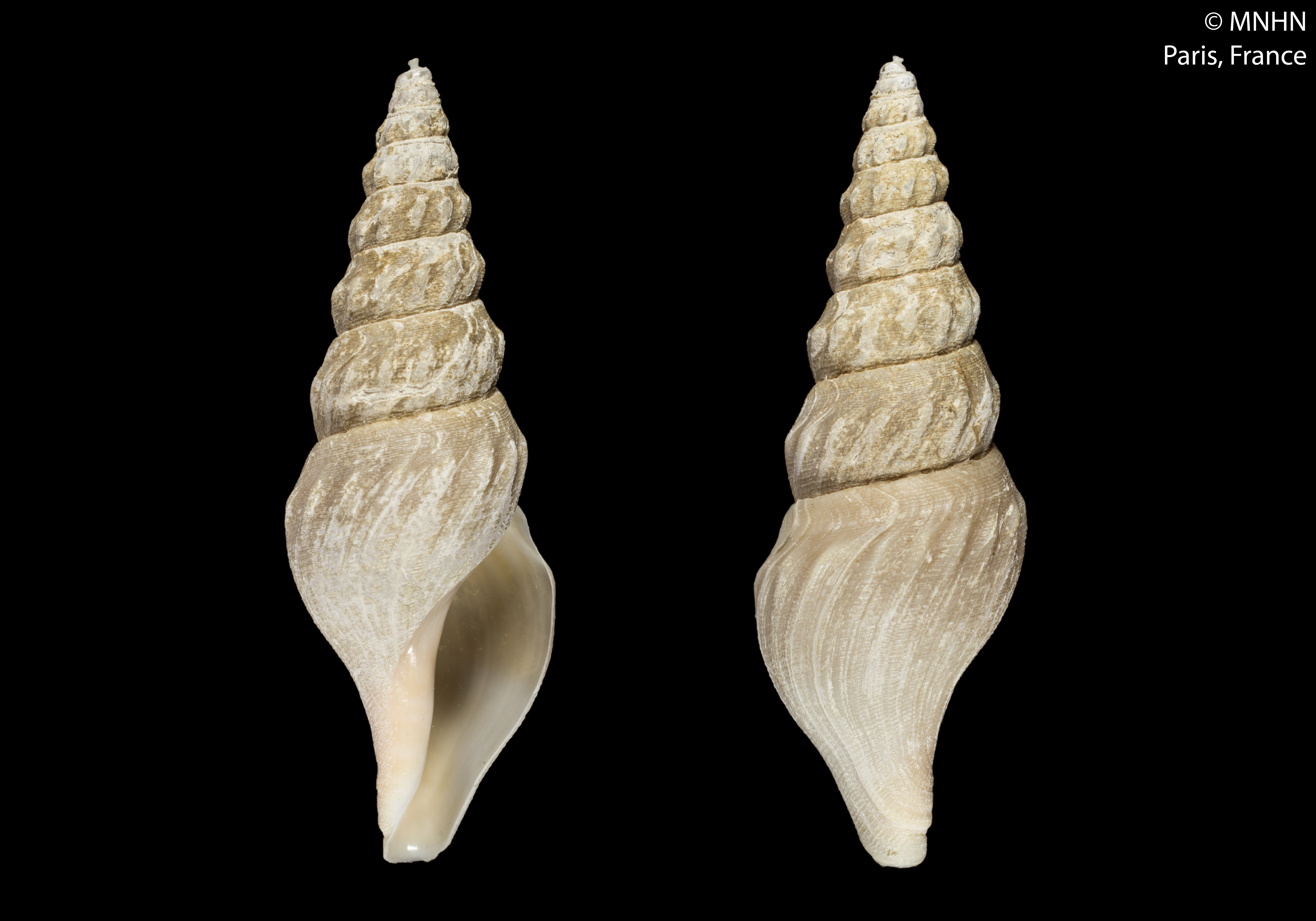
- Borsonia jaya

Scientific classification
- Kingdom: Animalia
- Phylum: Mollusca
- Class: Gastropoda
- Subclass: Caenogastropoda
- Order: Neogastropoda
- Superfamily: Conoidea
- Family: Borsoniidae
- Genus: Borsonia
- Species: B. jaya

Binomial name
- Borsonia jaya Sysoev, 1997

= Borsonia jaya =

Species of gastropod

Borsonia jaya is a species of sea snail, a marine gastropod mollusk in the family Borsoniidae.

== Description ==
The size of the shell attains 70 mm.

== Distribution ==
This marine species occurs in the Arafura Sea at depths between 676 meters and 1084 meters.
