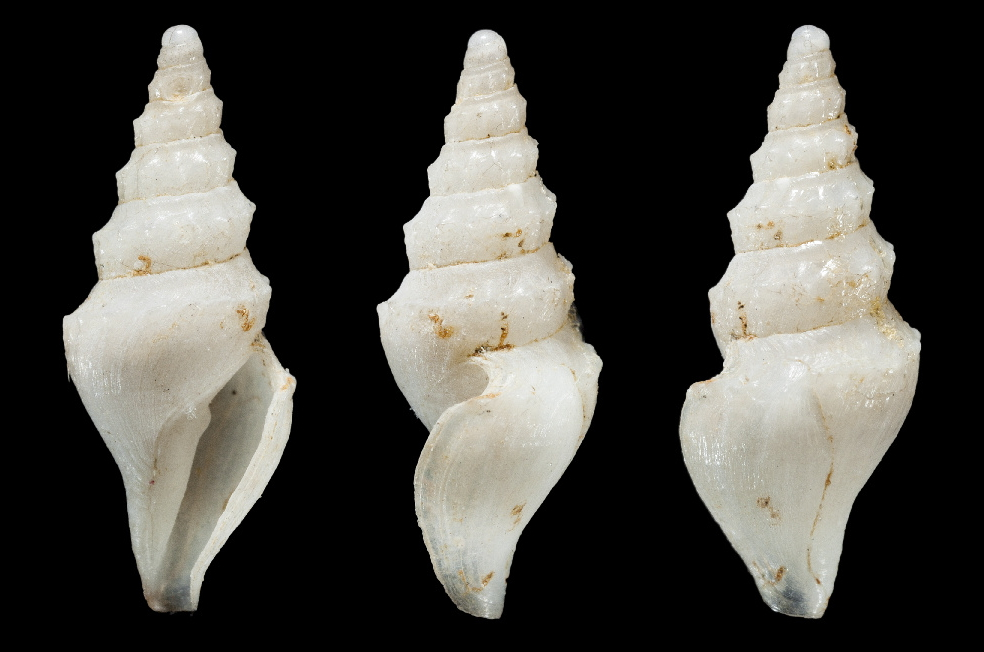
- Shell of Borsonia silicea (specimen at the Natural History Museum, London)

Scientific classification
- Kingdom: Animalia
- Phylum: Mollusca
- Class: Gastropoda
- Subclass: Caenogastropoda
- Order: Neogastropoda
- Superfamily: Conoidea
- Family: Borsoniidae
- Genus: Borsonia
- Species: B. silicea

Binomial name
- Borsonia silicea (Watson, 1881)

Synonyms
- Pleurotoma (Borsonia) silicea Watson, 1881 (original combination)

= Borsonia silicea =

Species of gastropod

Borsonia silicea is a species of sea snail, a marine gastropod mollusk in the family Borsoniidae.

== Description ==
The size of the shell attains 10 mm.

(Original description) Shell.—The high, narrow shell has a biconical shape with a tall, blunt, scalar spire, and a short contracted base. The whorls are angulated, but hardly prominent above, tubercled but scarcely ribbed, obsoletely spiralled.

Sculpture : there are in the middle of the whorls small rounded tubercles, of which there are about 11 on the first ordinary and 16 on the body whorl. On the earlier whorls they are feebly prolonged downwards as riblets, but become weaker on the last whorls. The whole surface is closely scratched with hair-like and somewhat irregular lines of growth.

Spirals—an exceedingly slight pad forms a faint inferior margination to the suture. Between this and the line of tubercles the profile is oblique and straight, not concave. Below the keel formed by the tubercles are a few very faint and sparse spiral threads.

Colour: pale flinty, whence the name.

The spire is conical, with interrupted profile-lines. The apex consists of two glossy, tumid, rounded whorls of nearly equal size, and with a very slight suture. There are 8 whorls in all, of slow and regular increase.. They are shouldered above and almost cylindrical below the keel. The last is small, contracts from the keel, and has a short, conical, hardly tumid base prolonged into a short small snout. The suture is very slightly impressed and rather oblique. The aperture is small, narrow, pear-shaped, angulated above, and drawn out into a short open siphonal canal in front. The outer lip is steeply curved above, a little flatly prolonged forward. Its edge, which retreats at the canal, is prominently rounded in the middle, and forms a high shoulder above, between which and the body is the rather deep, narrow, rounded sinus. The inner lip has a thinnish glaze on the body and columella, whose union is very slightly concave. At that point occurs the generic fold, which is somewhat remote within the aperture, and is a rather strong thread. The front of the columella is rather oblique, sharpish, and twisted.

== Distribution ==
This marine species occurs off Northeast Brazil.
