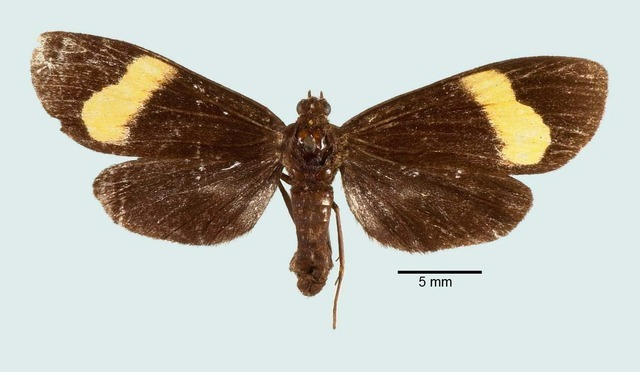

Scientific classification
- Kingdom: Animalia
- Phylum: Arthropoda
- Clade: Pancrustacea
- Class: Insecta
- Order: Lepidoptera
- Superfamily: Noctuoidea
- Family: Notodontidae
- Genus: Ephialtias
- Species: E. consueta

Binomial name
- Ephialtias consueta (Walker, 1854)

Synonyms
- Josia consueta Walker, 1854; Josia lugens C. & R. Felder, 1874

= Ephialtias consueta =

Species of moth

Ephialtias consueta is a moth of the family Notodontidae. It is found in the lower Amazon in Brazil.
