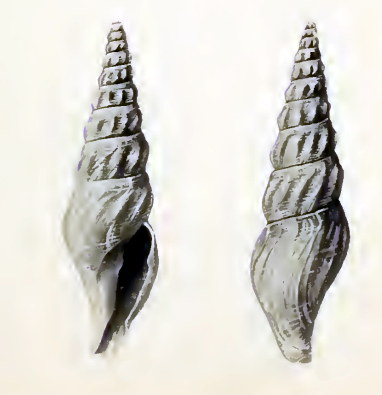
- Original image of a shell of Borsonia timorensis

Scientific classification
- Kingdom: Animalia
- Phylum: Mollusca
- Class: Gastropoda
- Subclass: Caenogastropoda
- Order: Neogastropoda
- Superfamily: Conoidea
- Family: Borsoniidae
- Genus: Borsonia
- Species: B. timorensis

Binomial name
- Borsonia timorensis (M.M. Schepman, 1913)

Synonyms
- Surcula timorensis Schepman, 1913 (original combination)

= Borsonia timorensis =

Species of gastropod

Borsonia timorensis is a species of sea snail, a marine gastropod mollusc in the family Borsoniidae.

== Description ==
The height of the shell attains 53 millimetres (2.1 in).

(Original description) The thin shell has an elongately fusiform shape, with a rather short siphonal canal. its color is dirty white. The nucleus is wanting. The 9 remaining whorls are divided in 2 parts, of which the upper part is excavated, slightly convex in itself in last 2 whorls. The lower part of each whorl shows rounded, oblique axial ribs, disappearing on the body whorl, where there are only traces on ventral side. These ribs number eleven on penultimate whorl. The finer sculpture consists of fine and coarse growth striae and spiral ones, stronger below the suture, across the convex ribbed part, fainter near the base. The aperture is elongated and angular above. The peristome is thin, with a wide, shallow sinus, just below the suture, then strongly protracted. The columellar margin is rather straight, with a faint fold at its upper half, not very conspicuous in the front view, with a rather thin, smooth layer of enamel. The siphonal canal is wide, slightly directed to the left. The body whorl is regularly attenuated towards its base.

== Distribution ==
This marine species occurs in the Timor Sea, Indonesia.
