= Borsonia symbiophora =

Scientific classification
- Kingdom: Animalia
- Phylum: Mollusca
- Class: Gastropoda
- Subclass: Caenogastropoda
- Order: Neogastropoda
- Superfamily: Conoidea
- Family: Borsoniidae
- Genus: Borsonia
- Species: B. symbiophora

Binomial name
- Borsonia symbiophora Sysoev, 1996

Species of gastropod

Borsonia symbiophora is a species of sea snail, a marine gastropod mollusk in the family Borsoniidae.

== Description ==
The size of the shell attains 70 mm.

== Distribution ==
This marine species occurs off the Solomon Islands.
