= Borsonia saccoi =

Scientific classification
- Kingdom: Animalia
- Phylum: Mollusca
- Class: Gastropoda
- Subclass: Caenogastropoda
- Order: Neogastropoda
- Superfamily: Conoidea
- Family: Borsoniidae
- Genus: Borsonia
- Species: B. saccoi

Binomial name
- Borsonia saccoi Dall, 1908

Synonyms
- Borsonia (Borsonella) saccoi Dall, 1908 (original combination)

Species of gastropod

Borsonia saccoi is a species of sea snail, a marine gastropod mollusk in the family Borsoniidae.

== Description ==
The size of the shell attains 14 mm.

(Original description) The solid shell is much eroded. It is short, chalky, with an olive-gray periostracum and over five whorls. The short spire is conic. The nuclear whorls are lost. The anal fasciole is depressed, forming a constricted concave band near the posterior edge of the whorl which is thickened and marginate. On the anterior side of the fasciole the shoulder of the whorl forms the periphery on which arc (thirteen on the body whorl) short, rounded, wavelike nodules or axial ribs which are slightly protective and do not extend over the base. The other axial sculpture is composed of rather marked elevated, more or less irregular lines of growth. On the fasciole and base these are more or less obscured by spiral impressed lines with much wider interspaces, which appear feeble and as if obsolete where not eroded. The siphonal canal is short and straight. The outer lip is simple with the sulcus near the suture, rather wide and deep when complete. The body has a white callus and near the insertion of the columella a single very strong sharp edged spiral plication extending into the spire. The plication on the columella extends fully to the columellar callus, and is quite conspicuous.

== Distribution ==
This marine species occurs in the Gulf of Panama.
