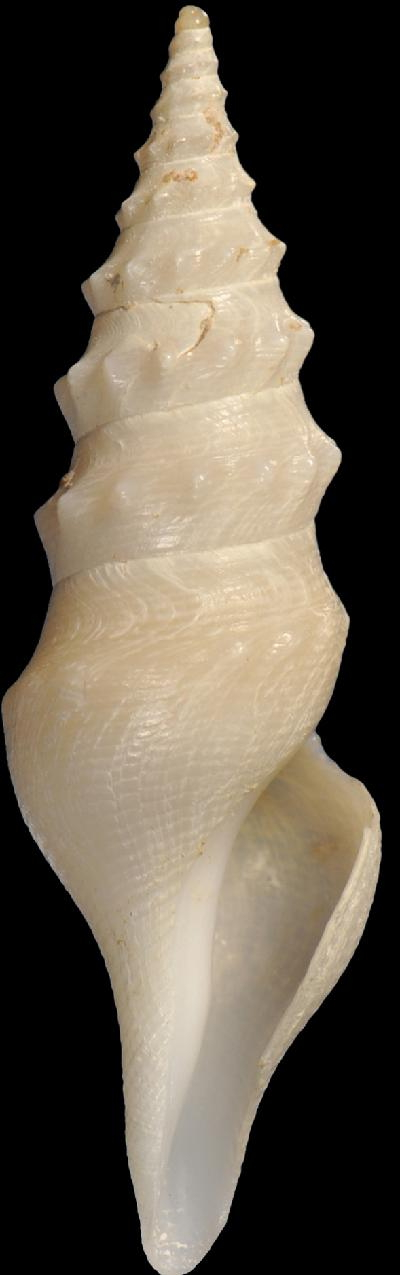
- Shell of Borsonia syngenes (specimen at MNHN, Paris)

Scientific classification
- Kingdom: Animalia
- Phylum: Mollusca
- Class: Gastropoda
- Subclass: Caenogastropoda
- Order: Neogastropoda
- Superfamily: Conoidea
- Family: Borsoniidae
- Genus: Borsonia
- Species: B. syngenes

Binomial name
- Borsonia syngenes (Watson, 1881)

Synonyms
- Pleurotoma (Surcula) ceroplasta Watson, 1881 (original combination)

= Borsonia syngenes =

Species of gastropod

Borsonia syngenes is a species of sea snail, a marine gastropod mollusk in the family Borsoniidae.

== Description ==
The length of the shell reaches 29 mm.

(Original description) The long, narrow shell has a biconically fusiform shape, sharply carinated and tubercled on the keel, polished, thin, white.

Sculpture. Longitudinals—there are very many, fine, close-set, slightly raised flexuous lines of growth. Spirals—there is a sharp keel which lies about down the whorls. It is very prominent from the concavity of the whorl above and below. The sharpness of this keel is due not so much to its crest, which is rounded, but to its being beset by prominent round, conical, pointed tubercles, of which there are about 15 on the penultimate whorl. On the upper whorls these are fewer, but they begin at once on the first whorl below the embryonic shell. On the body whorl they disappear entirely toward the aperture. Besides the carina, there are many delicate lines three or four of these, very fine, smooth, and flat, come in below the suture; at about 1/30 inch below the suture is a fine, sharp, engraved line. About 6 more of these, but less strong, come in above the keel. Below the keel the sculpture is somewhat similar, but less distinct and less regular. On the snout the interstices rise into rounded, slightly roughened threads, which on the extreme point become feebler.

Colour ivory-white.

The spire is high, narrow, conical, but with the profile-lines broken by the deep concave curves at the sutures. The apex, the 2 1/2 embryonic whorls are small, cylindrical, and bluntly rounded at the top, which is slightly pressed down on one side. The 11 1/2 whorls are strongly angulated, with a concave curve between the keels. They are rather narrow and of very slow increase. The body whorl is a little tumid, with a very regular convex curve, which contracts evenly to a long, projecting, narrow, cylindrical snout, lying very nearly in the axis of the shell. The suture a very faint, delicate, and regular line, well defined by the concavity of the whorl both above and below it. The aperture is club-shaped, but long and narrow, sharply pointed above, and very much twisted in consequence of the great depth and width of the sinus. The outer lip, originating markedly below the keel it leaves the body at a very acute angle. Its edge, which is sharp throughout, retreats at once, forming a very narrow and short ledge between the body whorl and the sinus, which is rounded and open, and whose depth is due entirely to the great forward sweep of the lip below, where it projects like the pinion of a wing and is slightly patulous. It curves in laterally to the origin of the siphonal canal, and then advances very straight and scarcely patulous to the rounded point of the shell. The inner lip is slightly cut out of the substance of the shell, is very narrow and very straight, the cutting away of the point of the columella being very gradual and very slightly oblique.

== Distribution ==
This marine species occurs off Puerto Rico, Saint Thomas, U.S. Virgin Islands and the Virgin Islands.
