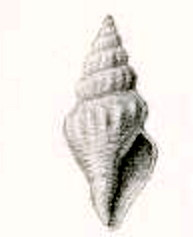
- Original drawing of a shell of Borsonia hirondelleae

Scientific classification
- Kingdom: Animalia
- Phylum: Mollusca
- Class: Gastropoda
- Subclass: Caenogastropoda
- Order: Neogastropoda
- Superfamily: Conoidea
- Family: Borsoniidae
- Genus: Borsonia
- Species: B. hirondelleae

Binomial name
- Borsonia hirondelleae (Dautzenberg, 1891)

Synonyms
- Leucosyrinx circumcinctum Locard, E.A.A., 1897; Leucosyrinx erranea (Locard, E.A.A., 1897); Pleurotoma circumcinctum Locard, 1897; Pleurotoma denudatum Locard, 1897; Pleurotoma erraneum Locard, 1897; Pleurotoma hirondelleae Dautzenberg, 1891 (original combination); Pleurotoma scitulinum Locard, 1897

= Borsonia hirondelleae =

Species of gastropod

Borsonia hirondelleae is a species of sea snail, a marine gastropod mollusk in the family Borsoniidae. The specific name hirondelleae refers to the ship Hirondelle, that was used to collect molluscs from the Bay of Biscay.

== Description ==
The size of the shell attains 32 mm, its width : 12 mm. The shell is not very solid, whitish, and has a fusiform shape. The rather high shell is turriculate and contains seven convex whorls, subangular at the periphery, separated by a simple suture. The whorls contain longitudinal, nodulose ribs (13 on the penultimate whorl). The aperture is narrow and is half as long as the length of the shell. The front of the columella is slightly twisted and has a small callus. The outer lip is simple and sharp. It forms a rather narrow sinus.

== Distribution ==
This marine species occurs off Morocco, off the Azores and in the Bay of Biscay.
