= Kermidaphnella bifasciata =

Scientific classification
- Kingdom: Animalia
- Phylum: Mollusca
- Class: Gastropoda
- Subclass: Caenogastropoda
- Order: Neogastropoda
- Superfamily: Conoidea
- Family: Raphitomidae
- Genus: Kermidaphnella
- Species: K. bifasciata

Binomial name
- Kermidaphnella bifasciata (Pease, 1860)

Synonyms
- Borsonia bifasciata Pease, 1860; Kermia bifasciata (Pease, 1860)

Species of gastropod

Kermidaphnella bifasciata is a species of sea snail, a marine gastropod mollusk in the family Raphitomidae.

== Description ==
The length of the shell varies between 5.32 mm and 8.04 mm.

(Original description) The fusiform, shining shell is longitudinally coarsely ribbed (14 on the body whorl) and crossed by coarse raised striae. The protoconch consists of three brown conical whorls. The five whorls of the teleoconch are rounded at the sutures. The outer lip is thick, incurved, serrated on the edges at the termination of the transverse striae. The ovate aperture has no denticles. The siphonal canal is short and slightly recurved. The colour of the shell is white. There are two light brown bands on each whorl.

== Taxonomy ==
It was assigned to Kermia by Kay, 1979, and moved to the new genus Kermidaphnella in 2025.

== Distribution ==
This marine species occurs off Hawaii and Easter Island and French Polynesia; also in the Red Sea.
