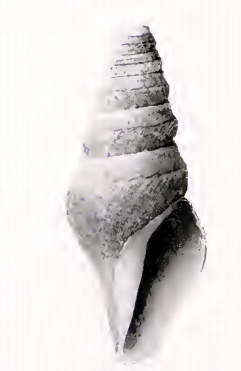
- Original image of a shell of Borsonella barbarensis

Scientific classification
- Kingdom: Animalia
- Phylum: Mollusca
- Class: Gastropoda
- Subclass: Caenogastropoda
- Order: Neogastropoda
- Superfamily: Conoidea
- Family: Borsoniidae
- Genus: Borsonella
- Species: B. barbarensis

Binomial name
- Borsonella barbarensis Dall, 1919

Synonyms
- Spirotropis (Borsonella) barbarensis (Dall, 1919)

= Borsonella barbarensis =

Species of gastropod

Borsonella barbarensis is a species of sea snail, a marine gastropod mollusk in the family Borsoniidae.

== Description ==
(Original description) The solid shell consists of six or more whorls. The apex is decollated. The periostracum is greenish olive over a white substratum, yellowish on the columella. The suture is distinct with a convex spiral band between it and the fasciole. The spiral sculpture shows a pronounced keel in front of the fasciole, on the upper part of the spire this keel may be more or less undulated. In front of the keel the surface is retractively somewhat irregularly obliquely grooved, with wider flattish interspaces upon which is a minute protractively looped sculpture giving a vermicular aspect to the surface under a magnifier The ovate aperture is simple. The outer lip is thin and sharp. The anal sulcus is wide and moderately deep. The columella is straight, attenuated in front, the plait hidden behind it. The siphonal canal is short and wide, the operculum missing.

The height of shell is 29 mm; of the body whorl, 20 mm; the diameter is 12 mm.

In this species the plait on the columella is generally hidden behind the columella so as to be invisible from a front view of the aperture.

== Distribution ==
This species occurs in the Pacific Ocean off California .
