= Crematogaster abrupta =

Scientific classification
- Domain: Eukaryota
- Kingdom: Animalia
- Phylum: Arthropoda
- Class: Insecta
- Order: Hymenoptera
- Family: Formicidae
- Subfamily: Myrmicinae
- Genus: Crematogaster
- Species: C. abrupta

Binomial name
- Crematogaster abrupta W. M. Mann, 1919

Species of ant

Crematogaster abrupta is a species of ant in tribe Crematogastrini. It was described by William M. Mann in 1919.
