= Mitromorpha brachyspira =

Scientific classification
- Kingdom: Animalia
- Phylum: Mollusca
- Class: Gastropoda
- Subclass: Caenogastropoda
- Order: Neogastropoda
- Superfamily: Conoidea
- Family: Mitromorphidae
- Genus: Mitromorpha
- Species: M. brachyspira

Binomial name
- Mitromorpha brachyspira (Suter, 1917)

Synonyms
- † Borsonia brachyspira Suter, 1917 (original combination)

Extinct species of gastropod

Mitromorpha brachyspira is an extinct species of sea snail, a marine gastropod mollusk in the family Mitromorphidae.

== Distribution ==
This extinct species is endemic to New Zealand.
