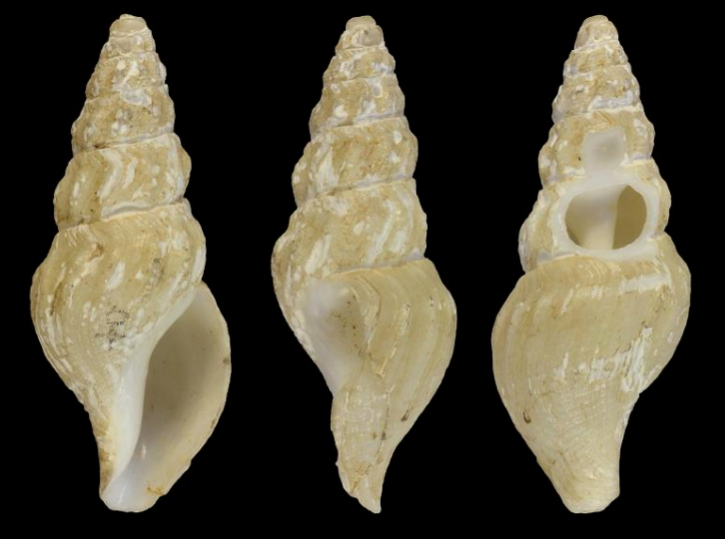
- Shell of Borsonella erosina (holotype at the Smithsonian Institution)

Scientific classification
- Kingdom: Animalia
- Phylum: Mollusca
- Class: Gastropoda
- Subclass: Caenogastropoda
- Order: Neogastropoda
- Superfamily: Conoidea
- Family: Borsoniidae
- Genus: Borsonella
- Species: B. erosina

Binomial name
- Borsonella erosina (Dall, 1908)

Synonyms
- Leucosyrinx erosina Dall, 1908

= Borsonella erosina =

Species of gastropod

Borsonella erosina is a species of sea snail, a marine gastropod mollusk in the family Borsoniidae.

== Description ==
The length of the shell attains 28 mm, the diameter 11.5 mm.

(Original description) The fusiform shell is white, with an olive-gray more or less dehiscent dull periostracum. The nucleus is eroded. There are about seven subsequent whorls. The spire without the nucleus is about equal in length to the aperture. The suture is appressed. A little in front of it is the anal fasciole, which is narrow, slightly constricted, and ill-defined. In front of it and forming the shoulder of the whorl is a series of about twelve round-topped, slightly protractive, wavelike axial ribs, which only reach the suture in front of them in the earlier whorls, falling short of it in the later ones. Other axial sculpture consists of rather irregular, more or less prominent incremental lines. The spiral sculpture consists of three or more somewhat obscure incised lines over the fasciole. On the basal side of the whorl are numerous rather distant, distinct spiral striae, subequal and nearly equidistant, the interspaces a little elevated and, on the canal, becoming threads. In addition to these there are on the middle of the whorls a quantity of irregular, oblique, somewhat vermicular, short incised lines, the interspaces between which are faintly beaded or reticulated by the short segments they intercept of the incremental lines. Traces of analogous sculpture can be observed with a lens also on the base. The aperture is semilunar. The outer lip is thin, sharp, with a shallow anal sulcus adjacent to the suture. The body with the sculpture erased, is white and polished. The white columella is solid, twisted, obliquely truncate in front. The siphonal canal is wide, short, recurved and flaring anteriorly. The operculum is rounded, triangular with an apical nucleus, pale brownish.

== Distribution ==
This marine species occurs in the Gulf of Panama and off Point Arena, California, United States.
