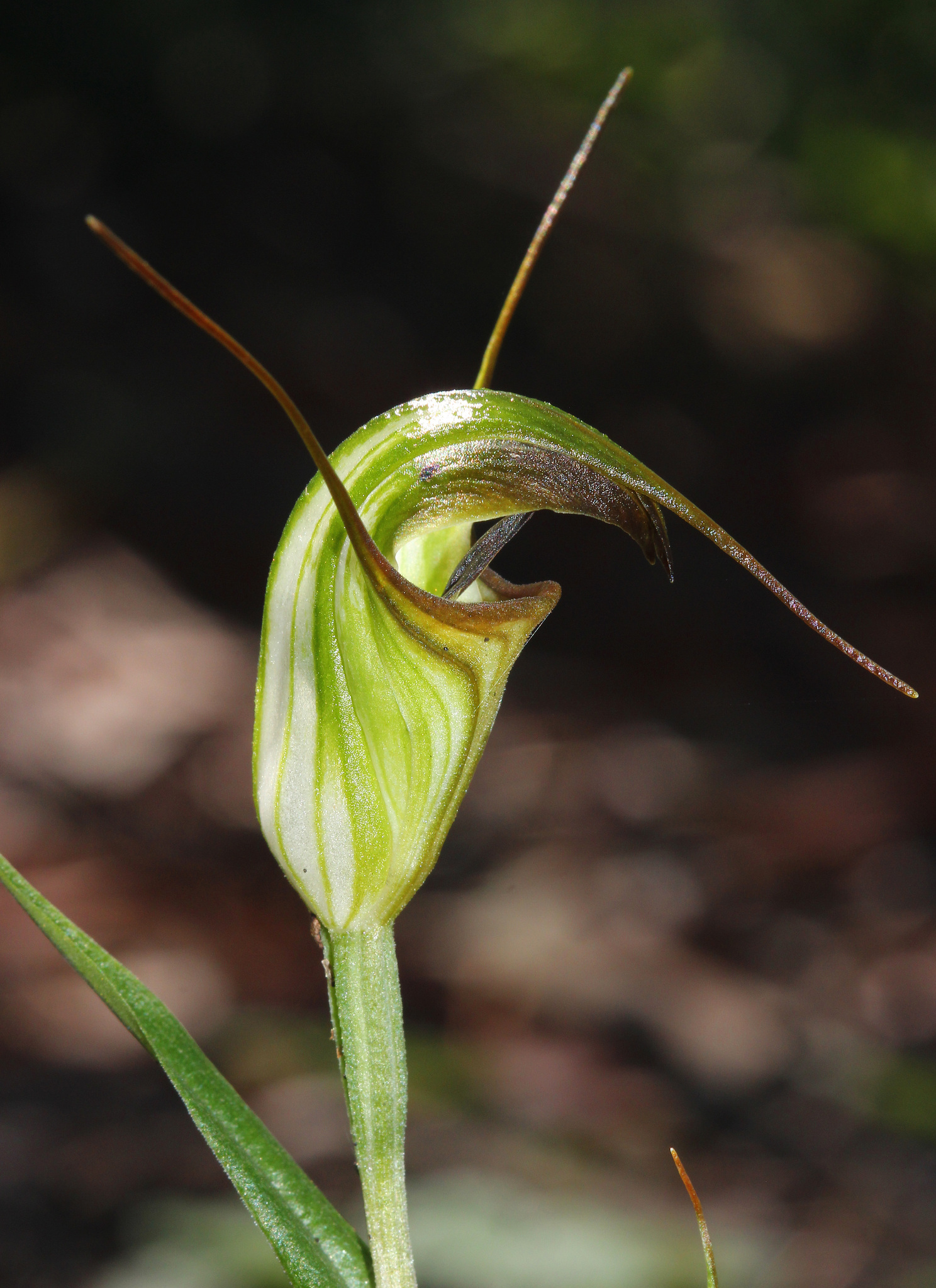
- Near Ebor Falls

Scientific classification
- Kingdom: Plantae
- Clade: Embryophytes
- Clade: Tracheophytes
- Clade: Angiosperms
- Clade: Monocots
- Order: Asparagales
- Family: Orchidaceae
- Subfamily: Orchidoideae
- Tribe: Cranichideae
- Genus: Pterostylis
- Species: P. abrupta

Binomial name
- Pterostylis abrupta D.L.Jones

Synonyms
- Diplodium abruptum (D.L.Jones) D.L.Jones & M.A.Clem.

= Pterostylis abrupta =

Tablelands greenhood

Species of orchid

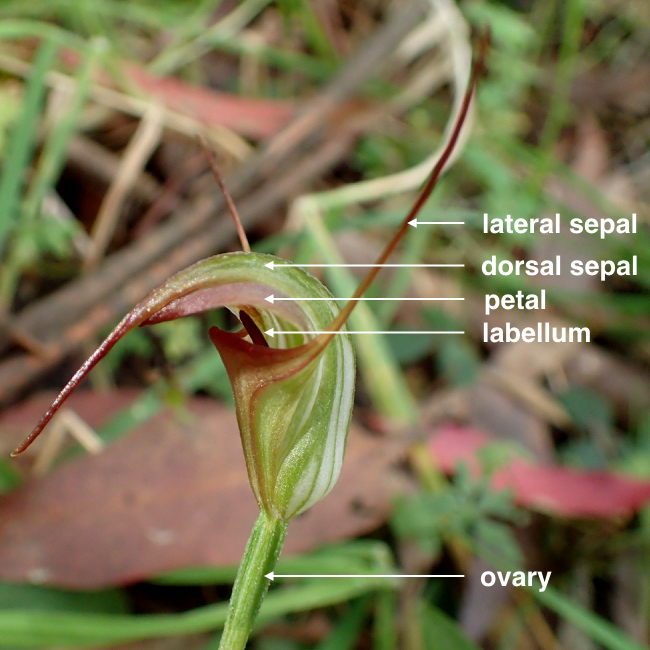
Labelled image

Pterostylis abrupta, commonly known as tablelands greenhood, is a species of orchid endemic to New South Wales, Australia. It is distinguished from similar greenhood orchids by its thick, flat, platform-like sinus and blunt labellum which is only just visible above the sinus.

== Description ==
Pterostylis abrupta is a terrestrial, perennial, deciduous, herb with an underground tuber and a rosette of dark green, crinkled leaves, each leaf 10–25 millimetres (0.4–1 in) long and 10–15 millimetres (0.4–0.6 in) wide. A single flower 23–27 millimetres (0.9–1 in) long and 12–15 millimetres (0.5–0.6 in) wide is borne on a stalk 150–450 millimetres (6–20 in) high. The flowers are dark green, white and brown. The dorsal sepal curves forward with a thread-like tip 10–18 millimetres (0.4–0.7 in) long and with the petals forms a hood or "galea". The lateral sepals have a thread-like tip 30–40 millimetres (1–2 in) long and there is a protruding, platform like sinus between their bases. The labellum is 13–15 millimetres (0.5–0.6 in) long, 4 millimetres (0.2 in) wide, brown, blunt and just visible behind the sinus. Flowering occurs from December to April.

== Taxonomy and naming ==
Pterostylis abrupta was first formally described in 1985 by David Jones and the description was published in The Orchadian. The specific epithet (abrupta) means "broken off".

== Distribution and habitat ==
Tablelands greenhood grows on ridges and slopes among rocks and grass in rich soil on the higher parts of the ranges and tablelands of New South Wales north from Barrington Tops.

== Use in horticulture ==
This greenhood is easily grown in pots although plants must be kept moist during the growing season and dry when dormant.
