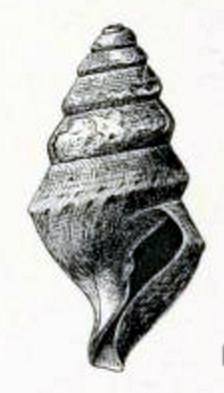
- Original drawing of a shell of Borsonella agassizii

Scientific classification
- Kingdom: Animalia
- Phylum: Mollusca
- Class: Gastropoda
- Subclass: Caenogastropoda
- Order: Neogastropoda
- Superfamily: Conoidea
- Family: Borsoniidae
- Genus: Borsonella
- Species: B. agassizii

Binomial name
- Borsonella agassizii (Dall, 1908)

Synonyms
- Borsonia (Borsonella) agassizii Dall, 1908

= Borsonella agassizii =

Species of gastropod

Borsonella agassizii is a species of sea snail, a marine gastropod mollusk in the family Borsoniidae. The snail was named after Louis_Agassiz.

== Description ==
The length of the shell attains 23 mm.

(Original description) The shell is biconic. The aperture is shorter than the spire. The apex is eroded but with six remaining whorls. The color of the shell is white and chalky under a pale greenish yellow periostracum. The suture is distinct, not appressed. The whorls are sloping flatly to the periphery which is marked by a rounded keel with (on the body whorl fifteen) obscure elongated swellings or undulations. The anal fasciole which is close to the suture is marked by lines of growth concavely arcuate, crossed by half a dozen spiral incised lines in the path of the sulcus. Below the keel are lines of growth, obscure traces of spiral distant incised lines, and numerous irregularly impressed striae, which are perhaps pathological. The base of the shell is moderately convex. The outer lip is thin, sharp, strongly protractive below the keel, above the latter with a wide, shallow anal sulcus reaching close to the suture. The body is polished, milkwhite. The columella is short, twisted, white, with a well-marked spiral plait near its insertion. The siphonal canal is wide, short, distally funicular, and somewhat recurved.

== Distribution ==
This species occurs in the Pacific Ocean off the Gulf of Panama and the Galapagos Islands.
