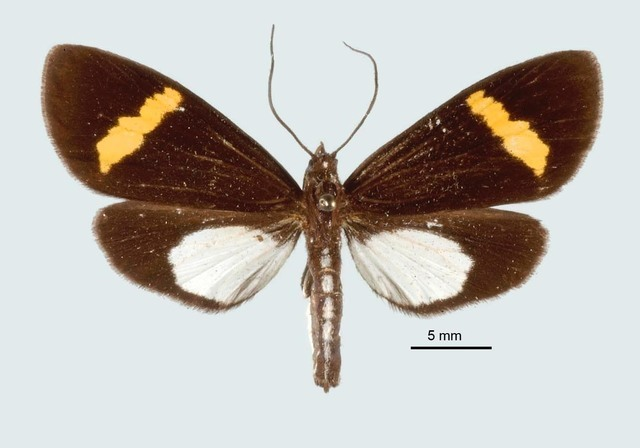
- Female
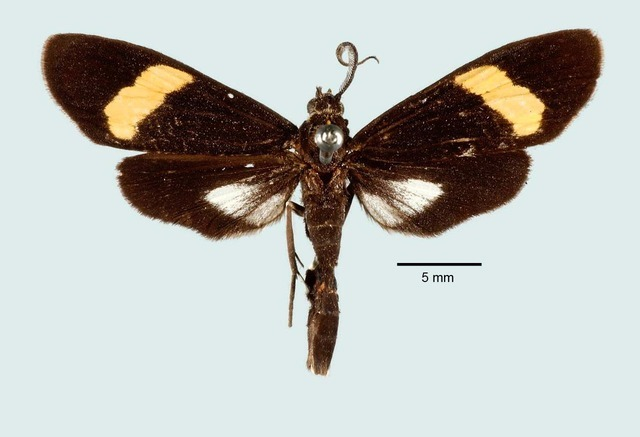
- Male

Scientific classification
- Kingdom: Animalia
- Phylum: Arthropoda
- Clade: Pancrustacea
- Class: Insecta
- Order: Lepidoptera
- Superfamily: Noctuoidea
- Family: Notodontidae
- Genus: Ephialtias
- Species: E. abrupta

Binomial name
- Ephialtias abrupta (Hübner, 1806)

Synonyms
- Hypocrita abrupta Hübner, 1806; Josia dorsivitta Walker, 1854; Josia hyperia Walker, 1854; Ephialtias basalis Butler, 1878; Josia pilarge Walker, 1854; Josia icca Prout, 1918

= Ephialtias abrupta =

Species of moth

Ephialtias abrupta is a moth of the family Notodontidae. It is found in from the lower Amazon (Pará) in Brazil.

The species is sexually dimorphic.
