= Thelymitra abrupta =

Scientific classification
- Kingdom: Plantae
- Clade: Tracheophytes
- Clade: Angiosperms
- Clade: Monocots
- Order: Asparagales
- Family: Orchidaceae
- Subfamily: Orchidoideae
- Tribe: Diurideae
- Genus: Thelymitra
- Species: T. abrupta

Binomial name
- Thelymitra abrupta R.J.Bates

Species of orchid

Thelymitra abrupta is a species of orchid in the family Orchidaceae and is endemic to South Australia. It has a single, erect, channelled, linear leaf and one or two small, intensely blue flowers with darker markings.

== Description ==
Thelymitra abrupta is a tuberous, terrestrial, spring-flowering orchid with a single erect, fleshy, channelled, linear leaf 40–100 mm (1.6–3.9 in) long, about 2 mm (0.079 in) wide, and dull green with a pink tinge. One or two small, intensely blue flowers with darker markings, 8–12 mm (0.31–0.47 in) wide are borne on a flowering stem 100–220 mm (3.9–8.7 in) tall. The sepals and petals are 5–7 mm (0.20–0.28 in) long and 2.5–3.0 mm (0.1–0.1 in) wide. The column is white or pale blue, about 4–5 mm (0.16–0.20 in) long and 2.0–2.5 mm (0.079–0.098 in) wide. The lobe on the top of the anther is dark blue with a red edge, only partly covers the anther, and ends abruptly. The side lobes project forwards or curve sharply upwards and have finger-like tufts of white hairs on their ends. Flowering has been observed in late October and early November, but the flowers open for only a short period.

== Taxonomy and naming ==
Thelymitra abrupta was first formally described in 2016 by Robert Bates in Australian Orchid Review from a specimen collected near Mount Burr in 2015. The specific epithet (abrupta) means "abrupt" or "suddenly cut off", referring to the middle anther lobe.

== Distribution and habitat ==
Thelymitra abrupta grows in sandy heath around swamps and bogs as well as on firebreaks and track sides on the Fleurieu Peninsula and near Mount Gambier in south-eastern South Australia.
