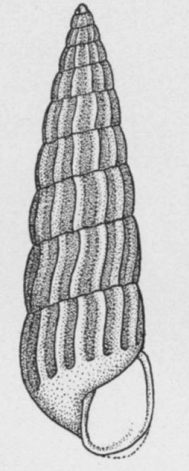
- Drawing of a shell of Turbonilla abrupta

Scientific classification
- Kingdom: Animalia
- Phylum: Mollusca
- Class: Gastropoda
- Family: Pyramidellidae
- Genus: Turbonilla
- Species: T. abrupta

Binomial name
- Turbonilla abrupta Bush, 1899

Synonyms
- Chemnitzia abrupta (Bush, 1899); Turbonilla levis auct. non C. B. Adams, 1850; Turbonilla gracilis Clessin, 1900; Turbonilla nesiotes Pimenta, A.D. & R.S. Absalão, 1998

= Turbonilla abrupta =

Species of gastropod

Turbonilla abrupta, common name the abrupt turbonilla, is a species of sea snail, a marine gastropod mollusk in the family Pyramidellidae, the pyrams and their allies.

== Description ==
The rather stout shell is of moderate size, measuring 4 mm, and irregularly coiled. Its color is dead white. The small protoconch is transverse to the axis, with projecting whorls. The teleoconch contains nine flattened whorls. The first 3 or 4 of these enlarge quite abruptly, while below the increase is very gradual. The suture is deep and nearly straight. The transverse ribs number about 20. They are rounded, oblique, and nearly straight. They are separated by wider, deep, flat-bottomed spaces which terminate just above the suture in very square-cut ends. The base of the shell is well-rounded and smooth. The aperture is somewhat elongated, expanded below with rounded angles. The thin inner-lip is reflected.

== Distribution ==
This marine species occurs in the following locations:

- Caribbean Sea: Colombia, Mexico
- Puerto Rico
- Gulf of Mexico
- Lesser Antilles; Virgin Islands
