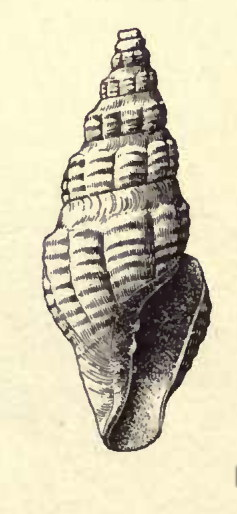
- Original drawing of a shell of Cordieria rouaultii

Scientific classification
- Kingdom: Animalia
- Phylum: Mollusca
- Class: Gastropoda
- Subclass: Caenogastropoda
- Order: Neogastropoda
- Superfamily: Conoidea
- Family: Borsoniidae
- Genus: Cordieria
- Species: C. rouaultii

Binomial name
- Cordieria rouaultii (Dall, 1889)

Synonyms
- Borsonia rouaultii Dall, 1889 (original combination)

= Cordieria rouaultii =

Species of gastropod

Cordieria rouaultii is a species of sea snail, a marine gastropod mollusk in the family Borsoniidae.

== Description ==
The size of the shell attains 14 mm, its width 5 mm.

(Original description) The shell is yellowish white with a pink vertex and the interspaces between the ribs of a pink brown, generally rather pale. The shell contains seven or eight whorls, two of which belong to the nucleus. The nucleus is glassy polished, smooth, swollen, rounded, its second whorl with an obsolete peripheral keel . The remainder of the shell has a rather strong sculpture. The spiral sculpture consists of three or four strong and a few much finer ridges between the sutures and in front of the anal fasciole. On the body whorl these continue over the base and siphonal canal. The anal fasciole shows only traces of the finer spiral threads. The transverse sculpture consists of nine stout short waves, or rounded ribs, with narrower interspaces, beginning in front of the fasciole and becoming obsolete in front of the whorl toward the canal. It also shows rather coarse, strong, and somewhat irregular incremental lines. And where the fasciole borders on the suture, the arched incremental lines are crowded into a series of not very regular plications, which form a band or series in front of the suture. The fasciole is slightly excavated. The surface of the shell carries a yellowish opaque thin epidermis. The whorls are moderately rounded. The base of the shell is subconical. The siphonal canal is short, rather large, slightly recurved and flaring at the tip. The anal sinus is rounded and rather shallow. The outer lip is convexly arched, sharp-edged, with or without a rib behind it, according to the stage of growth, with no varix. The aperture is narrow, long lirate in the throat. The columella is straight, near its junction with the body having two strong plaits, which continue internally to the apex of the shell. The inner lip has a coat of callus, somewhat reflected anteriorly in the adult.

This shell, owing to the coarseness of its sculpture, has a somewhat rude appearance, and is very characteristic.

== Distribution ==
This marine species occurs in the Caribbean Sea and off Barbados and Puerto Rico
