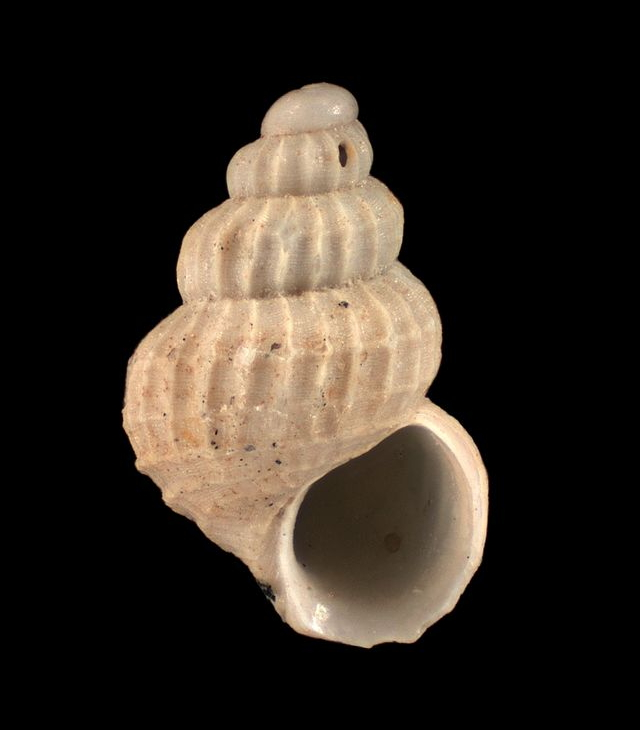
- Shell of Alvania abrupta (specimen at the Museum of New Zealand)

Scientific classification
- Kingdom: Animalia
- Phylum: Mollusca
- Class: Gastropoda
- Subclass: Caenogastropoda
- Order: Littorinimorpha
- Superfamily: Rissooidea
- Family: Rissoidae
- Genus: Alvania
- Species: A. abrupta

Binomial name
- Alvania abrupta (Dell, 1956)

Synonyms
- Alvania (Linemera) abrupta (Dell, 1956) · alternate representation; Alvinia (Linemera) abrupta (Dell, 1956) · unaccepted; Linemera abrupta Dell, 1956 · unaccepted (superseded combination)

= Alvania abrupta =

Species of gastropod

Alvania abrupta is a species of small sea snail, a marine gastropod mollusk or micromollusk in the family Rissoidae.

== Description ==
The length of the shell attains 2 mm, its diameter 1.4 mm.

== Distribution ==
This species is endemic to New Zealand and occurs at the Taiaroa Canyon, off Otago Peninsula.
