= Ipomoea abrupta =

Scientific classification
- Kingdom: Plantae
- Clade: Tracheophytes
- Clade: Angiosperms
- Clade: Eudicots
- Clade: Asterids
- Order: Solanales
- Family: Convolvulaceae
- Genus: Ipomoea
- Species: I. abrupta

Binomial name
- Ipomoea abrupta R.Br.

Species of plant

Ipomoea abrupta is a species of plant in the family Convolvulaceae of the genus Ipomoea. It is endemic to Western Australia.

== Description ==
It is a perennial, herbaceous liana with a stem diameter of 2 cm.
