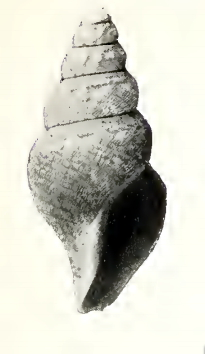
- Shell of Borsonella callicesta

Scientific classification
- Kingdom: Animalia
- Phylum: Mollusca
- Class: Gastropoda
- Subclass: Caenogastropoda
- Order: Neogastropoda
- Superfamily: Conoidea
- Family: Borsoniidae
- Genus: Borsonella
- Species: B. callicesta

Binomial name
- Borsonella callicesta (Dall, 1902)

Synonyms
- Antiplanes amphitrite Dall, 1919 junior subjective synonym; Antiplanes amphitrite var. beroe Dall, 1919 junior subjective synonym; Cryptogemma cymothoë Dall, 1919; Cryptogemma eidola Dall, W.H., 1919; Gemmula esuriens Dall, W.H., 1908; Gemmula esuriens pernoda (f) Dall, W.H., 1908; Pleurotoma callicesta Dall, 1902; Spirotropis cymothoë (Dall, 1919)

= Borsonella callicesta =

Species of gastropod

Borsonella callicesta is a species of sea snail, a marine gastropod mollusk in the family Borsoniidae.

== Description ==
The length of the shell attains 13.5 mm, its diameter 6 mm.

The small shell is white, covered with an olivaceous periostracum, and with four whorls exclusive of an apical whorl or two (which in the specimens is always eroded). The suture is distinct. The edge of the whorl in front of it is slightly thickened. The spiral sculpture on the upper whorls consists of a somewhat blunt peripheral keel, undulated more or less toward the apex and obsolete on the body whorl. Other sculpture consists of minute, broken, irregular, more or less oblique, usually punctate impressed lines. The aperture is simple. The outer lip is sharp. The body of the shell is erased and white. The siphonal canal is short, somewhat recurved

The height of four whorls, 15 mm; of the body whorl, 10 mm; diameter of the shell: 7 mm.

(Described as Antiplanes amphitrite) The white shell is covered with a pale olivaceous periostracum. It contains five or more well-rounded whorls exclusive of the (lost) protoconch. These show a rounded shoulder and a distinct but not appressed suture. The axial sculpture consists of, on the spire, obscure nodulations at the shoulder (about 15 on the penultimate whorl) which do not form ribs and are absent from the body whorl. The incremental lines are fine but obscure. Beside these there are minute, anteriorly obliquely retractive lines somewhat microscopically reticulated by the lines of growth.tTere is no spiral sculpture except on some specimens a few obsolete lines on the base. The anal sulcus is shallow, slightly removed from the suture. The fasciole is lightly impressed on the body whorl. The aperture is narrow. The outer lip is thin, sharp and arcuately produced. The inner lip is erased. The columella is white, solid straight, anteriorly obliquely attenuated. The siphonal canal is wide, straight and distinct

== Distribution ==
This species occurs in the Pacific Ocean off San Diego, California, Mexico and in the Gulf of Panama.
