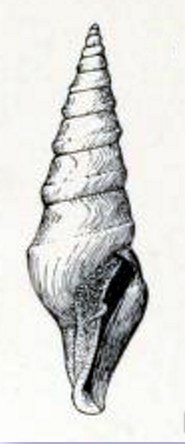
- Original drawing of a shell of Borsonella coronadoi

Scientific classification
- Kingdom: Animalia
- Phylum: Mollusca
- Class: Gastropoda
- Subclass: Caenogastropoda
- Order: Neogastropoda
- Superfamily: Conoidea
- Family: Borsoniidae
- Genus: Borsonella
- Species: B. coronadoi

Binomial name
- Borsonella coronadoi (Dall, 1908)

Synonyms
- Borsonella nychia Dall, 1919; Borsonia coronadoi Dall, 1908 (original combination); Borsonia (Borsonella) coronadoi Dall, 1908 (basionym); Spirotropis (Borsonella) cornadoi (Dall, 1908)

= Borsonella coronadoi =

Species of gastropod

Borsonella coronadoi is a species of sea snail, a marine gastropod mollusk in the family Borsoniidae.

== Description ==
The length of the shell attains 29 mm, its maximum diameter is 9 mm.

(Original description) The slender shell is acute with about ten whorls. Its color is pinkish white, with a pale brown periostracum. The spire is longer than the aperture. The nuclear whorls are smooth, turgid, the subsequent turns carrying a rounded low keel, usually in front of the middle of the whorls forming the pire, the area between which and the suture is flatly impressed, the whorl in front gently rounded. On some of the early whorls the keel is slightly undulated, but not regularly nodulous. Besides the lines of growth, both the fasciole and the anterior part of the whorl show indications under a lens of obscure regular distant spiral striae, and are also more or less marked with a faint vermicular reticulation of the surface. The distinct suture is not appressed. The aperture is narrow. The anal sulcus is deep and wide, reaching the suture The outer lip is thin, sharp, and arcuately produced. The inner lip is slightly eroded, polished, with no callus. There is plication at the proximal end of the columella. The axis is impervious, cnual short, wide, deep, slightly recurved with a fairly well-marked fascicle.

== Distribution ==
This species occurs in the Pacific Ocean off California.
