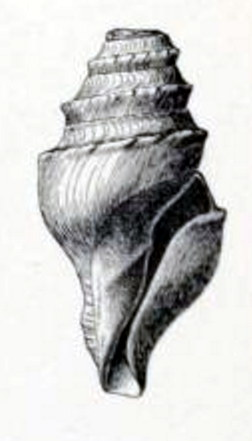
- Original drawing of a shell of Borsonella diegensis

Scientific classification
- Kingdom: Animalia
- Phylum: Mollusca
- Class: Gastropoda
- Subclass: Caenogastropoda
- Order: Neogastropoda
- Superfamily: Conoidea
- Family: Borsoniidae
- Genus: Borsonella
- Species: B. diegensis

Binomial name
- Borsonella diegensis (Dall, 1908)

Synonyms
- Borsonia diegensis Dall, 1908; Borsonia (Borsonella) diegensis Dall, 1908; Spirotropis (Borsonella) diegensis ^{(Dall, 1908)}

= Borsonella diegensis =

Species of gastropod

Borsonella diegensis is a species of sea snail, a marine gastropod mollusk in the family Borsoniidae.

== Description ==
Length of four whorls, 15.0 mm; of body whorl, 12.5 mm; of aperture, 9.5 mm; max. diam. 8.0 mm.

(Original description) The small shell is stout, solid, decollate, with a whitish substratum and strong olivaceous periostracum. The four remaining whorls are closely coiled and have the aperture longer than the remaining portion of the spire. The sculpture consists of a strong spiral keel, peripheral on the spire with more or less nodulation (in cue specimen with fifteen small nodules on the penultimate whorl, but none on the body whorl; another has them obsolete on the spire), stronger on the earlier whorls when present, an obscure ridge in front of the suture, stronger on the earlier whorls. There is a faint spiral striation on the anal fasciole between the ridge and the keel. The whole surface is covered with a microscopic, close, impressed, vermicular network of fine lines anastomosing in every direction. On the body whorl the keel is well above the periphery. The base of the shell is evenly rounded. The aperture is ample. The anal sulcus at the suture is wide and deep. The thin outer lip is arcuately produced. The columellar lip is smooth, with a glaze of callus. The plication on the proximal part of the columella lags behind the aperture. The siphonal canal is very wide and short and has an obsolete fasciole.

== Distribution ==
This species occurs in the Pacific Ocean off California.
