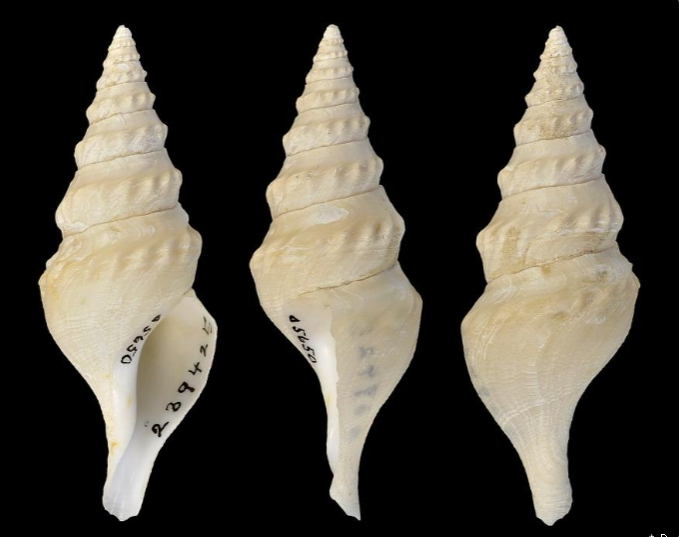
- Shell of Leucosyrinx diomedea (holotype at the Smithsonian Institution)

Scientific classification
- Kingdom: Animalia
- Phylum: Mollusca
- Class: Gastropoda
- Subclass: Caenogastropoda
- Order: Neogastropoda
- Superfamily: Conoidea
- Family: Pseudomelatomidae
- Genus: Leucosyrinx
- Species: L. diomedea

Binomial name
- Leucosyrinx diomedea (A. W. B. Powell, 1969)

Synonyms
- Comitas thisbe diomedea A. W. B. Powell, 1969 ·

= Leucosyrinx diomedea =

Species of gastropod

Leucosyrinx diomedea is a species of sea snail, a marine gastropod mollusc in the family Pseudomelatomidae.

== Description ==
The length of the shell attains 47 mm, its diameter 17.5 mm.

The species is known from only two specimens collected off Sulawesi, Indonesia. It is rather similar to Leucosyrinx luzonica, but it differs in the more gradual narrowing of the body whorl toward the siphonal canal. It may represent a form of Leucosyrinx luzonica, but because the available material for both species is very limited, a conservative approach is adopted and it is being treated as a separate species. Conchologically, it is very different from Leucosyrinx thisbe in that its axial folds do not extend to the shell base, it has weaker spiral sculpture, lacks a subsutural fold, and has a slenderer shell.

== Distribution ==
This marine species has been found off Sulawesi, Indonesia.
