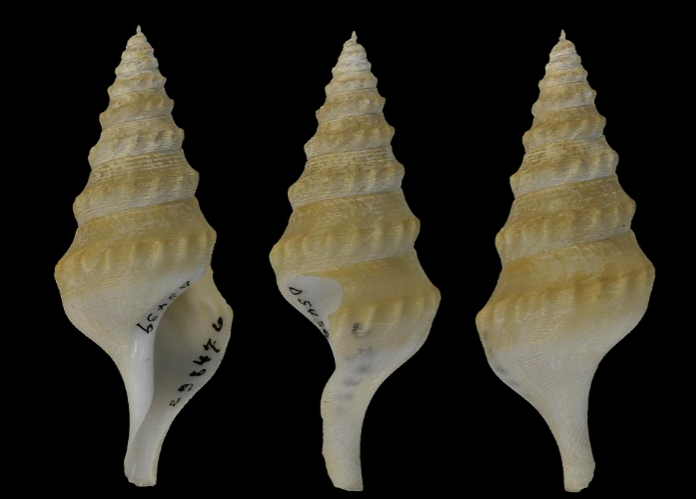
- Shell of Leucosyrinx luzonica (holotype at the Smithsonian Institution)

Scientific classification
- Kingdom: Animalia
- Phylum: Mollusca
- Class: Gastropoda
- Subclass: Caenogastropoda
- Order: Neogastropoda
- Superfamily: Conoidea
- Family: Pseudomelatomidae
- Genus: Leucosyrinx
- Species: L. luzonica

Binomial name
- Leucosyrinx luzonica (A.W.B. Powell, 1969)

Synonyms
- Comitas luzonica Powell, 1969 (original combination)

= Leucosyrinx luzonica =

Species of gastropod

Leucosyrinx luzonica is a species of sea snail, a marine gastropod mollusk in the family Pseudomelatomidae, the turrids and allies.

== Description ==
The length of the shell attains 47.4 mm.

The shell is medium-sized, reaching 42 mm in the holotype. it is thin and fragile, broadly fusiform, and characterized by a medium-high spire and a brownish-olive coloration. The protoconch is unknown. The teleoconch whorls are obtusely angular at the shoulder and bear a distinctly concave subsutural ramp. The suture is narrowly channeled.

The body whorl carries 16–18 strong, slightly oblique axial folds on and shortly below the shoulder; these folds do not reach the lower suture on the teleoconch whorls.

The spiral sculpture is well developed and consists of rather broad, low, rounded cords of similar width that extend over the entire shell, though they are less pronounced on the subsutural ramp. The intervals between the cords are narrower than the cords themselves.

The shell base is strongly convex and rapidly narrows, passing smoothly into a medium-long, straight siphonal canal that is slightly inclined leftwards. The aperture is rather broad, elongate-oval, and well differentiated from the siphonal canal. The columellar and parietal callus is well developed and white. A deep, subsutural, broadly arcuate anal sinus extends across the subsutural ramp and is confluent with the large forward extension of the outer lip, as inferred from the course of the growth lines, since the outer apertural lip is incomplete in all available specimens.

The radula shows about 30 rows of teeth, of which 11–12 are nascent. The marginal teeth are duplex and long, measuring approximately 460 µm in length, corresponding to 6.6% of the aperture length excluding the canal. The major limb is narrowly lanceolate and slightly curved. The accessory limb is more than twice as narrow, rather flat, measures about 0.75 of the total tooth length, and is inserted into a deep, distinct socket on the dorsal side of the major limb.

== Distribution ==
This marine species occurs off Luzon Island (the Philippines) to the South China Sea at a depths between 1456 m to 1743 m.
