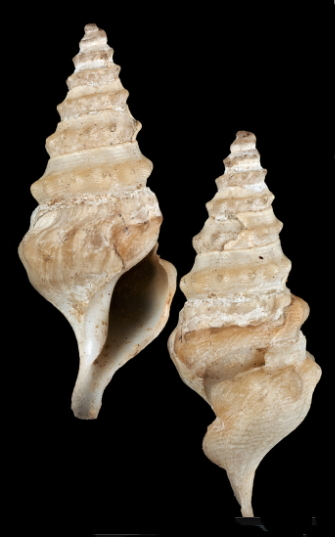
- Shell of Leucosyrinx suratensis (holotype at Museum für Naturkunde)

Scientific classification
- Kingdom: Animalia
- Phylum: Mollusca
- Class: Gastropoda
- Subclass: Caenogastropoda
- Order: Neogastropoda
- Superfamily: Conoidea
- Family: Pseudomelatomidae
- Genus: Leucosyrinx
- Species: L. suratensis

Binomial name
- Leucosyrinx suratensis (Thiele, 1925)

Synonyms
- Comitas suratensis (Thiele, 1925) superseded combination; Surcula suratensis Thiele, 1925 (original combination)

= Leucosyrinx suratensis =

Species of gastropod

Leucosyrinx suratensis is a species of sea snail, a marine gastropod mollusc in the family Pseudomelatomidae, the turrids and allies.

== Description ==
The holotype measures 16.6 mm in shell length and exhibits significant shell breakage followed by subsequent repair, resulting in an exaggeratedly deep anal sinus. The remaining intact whorls demonstrate the characteristic shape of the anal sinus typical of Leucosyrinx, and, overall, the shell morphology aligns with the variability seen within the genus.

Leucosyrinx suratensis resembles several species of Leucosyrinx, particularly Leucosyrinx floraecharlottae and Leucosyrinx ringevali. However, it differs in having more pronounced spiral cords on the subsutural ramp and a stouter shell with a more rapidly constricting shell base.

== Distribution ==
This marine species occurs off Sumatra, Indonesia; depth 1024 m.
