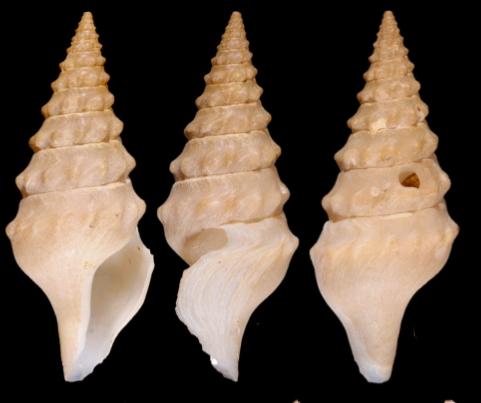
- Shell of Leucosyrinx floraecharlottae(holotype)

Scientific classification
- Kingdom: Animalia
- Phylum: Mollusca
- Class: Gastropoda
- Subclass: Caenogastropoda
- Order: Neogastropoda
- Superfamily: Conoidea
- Family: Pseudomelatomidae
- Genus: Leucosyrinx
- Species: L. floraecharlottae

Binomial name
- Leucosyrinx floraecharlottae Kantor, Fedosov & Puillandre, 2025

= Leucosyrinx floraecharlottae =

Species of gastropod

Leucosyrinx floraecharlottae is a species of sea snail, a marine gastropod mollusk in the family Pseudomelatomidae, the turrids and allies.

== Description ==
The length of the shell of the holotype attains 29.2 mm, its diameter 9.1 mm. The length of the largest specimen attains 32.7 mm

(Original description) The shell (holotype) is medium-sized, fusiform, and fragile, with a high spire and a uniform light tan coloration. It consists of 9.75 teleoconch whorls. The protoconch is paucispiral, consisting of approximately 1.5 rounded whorls that are slightly flattened apically. The transition between the protoconch and teleoconch is indistinct due to erosion but can be recognized by the onset of axial ribbing.

The teleoconch whorls are rounded at the shoulder and exhibit a weakly concave subsutural ramp. The suture is shallow, impressed, and slightly undulating. The body whorl bears 17 strong, oblique, short, broad, and rounded axial folds, while the penultimate whorl bears 14 such folds. These folds become weaker on the subsutural ramp, diminish toward the lower suture, and disappear at the periphery of the body whorl. On the upper teleoconch whorls, the folds are more closely spaced, whereas on the body whorl, the interspaces are narrower than the folds themselves.

The spiral sculpture is weak and consists of low, rounded, narrow, and indistinct cords distributed over the entire shell surface. Numerous thin growth lines are present, being particularly prominent on the subsutural ramp. The base of the shell is weakly convex and transitions smoothly into a long, straight siphonal canal. The aperture is narrow and elongate-oval, and it is only poorly differentiated from the siphonal canal. The inner lip is slightly convex. The columellar and parietal regions are covered by a narrow but distinct callus, which is lighter in color than the rest of the body whorl. A moderately deep, subsutural, broadly arcuate anal sinus extends across the subsutural ramp and is confluent with the pronounced forward extension of the outer lip.

The radula, examined from the holotype, is short and comprises 32 transverse rows of teeth, of which 11–12 are nascent. The central formation is reduced to inconspicuous folds of the radular membrane. The marginal teeth are duplex and measure approximately 410 µm in length, corresponding to 4.6% of the aperture length excluding the canal. The anterior portion of each tooth is dorsoventrally flattened and bears sharp cutting edges in lateral view. The major limb is narrowly lanceolate and slightly curved, whereas the accessory limb is nearly twice as narrow, approximately three-quarters of the total tooth length, and is inserted into a shallow but distinct socket on the dorsal side of the major limb.

== Distribution ==
This marine species occurs in the Solomon Sea at depths between 694 m and 760 m.
