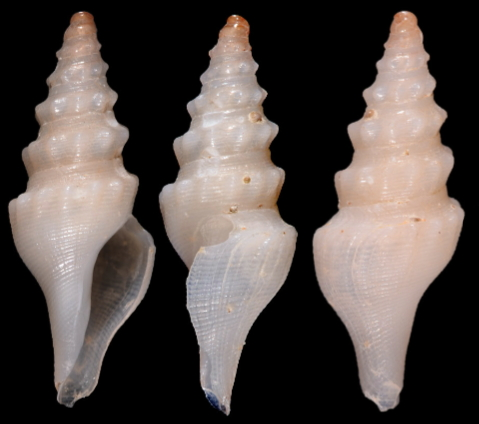
- Shell of Leucosyrinx lozoueti (holotype)

Scientific classification
- Kingdom: Animalia
- Phylum: Mollusca
- Class: Gastropoda
- Subclass: Caenogastropoda
- Order: Neogastropoda
- Superfamily: Conoidea
- Family: Pseudomelatomidae
- Genus: Leucosyrinx
- Species: L. lozoueti

Binomial name
- Leucosyrinx lozoueti Kantor, Fedosov & Puillandre, 2025

= Leucosyrinx lozoueti =

Species of gastropod

Leucosyrinx lozoueti is a species of sea snail, a marine gastropod mollusk in the family Pseudomelatomidae, the turrids and allies.

== Description ==
The length of the shell attains 9.2 mm, its diameter 3.4 mm.

(Original description) The small and slender shell is fusiform, with a high spire. It has a very light tan coloration, and a thin, glossy surface. The protoconch is small and paucispiral, consisting of about 1.75 smooth, bulbous, light brown whorls. The transition from protoconch to teleoconch is only barely discernible and is marked by the onset of the definitive sculpture. The teleoconch comprises slightly more than 4.5 whorls that are distinctly angular at the shoulder, and the subsutural ramp is evenly and strongly concave on all whorls. The suture is distinct and impressed.

The last and penultimate whorls bear 14–15 strong, slightly oblique, and closely spaced axial folds on and just below the shoulder. These folds reach the lower suture on the teleoconch whorls and gradually diminish toward the aperture on the body whorl, although they remain present there.

The spiral sculpture is well developed and consists of narrow, low, rounded, and wavy cords of similar width that extend over the entire shell, including the subsutural ramp. On the body whorl there are five slightly broader cords below the suture and four on the penultimate whorl, and about thirty wavy cords below the shoulder on the body whorl. In most areas, the interspaces between the cords are narrower than the cords themselves.

The shell base is weakly convex and passes gradually into a medium-long, straight canal. The aperture is narrow-oval and well differentiated from the siphonal canal. The columellar and parietal callus is well developed and of the same color as the rest of the shell. A moderately deep, subsutural, broadly arcuate anal sinus extends across the subsutural ramp and is confluent with the large forward extension of the outer lip.

The radula comprises around 32 rows of teeth, of which 6 are nascent. The marginal teeth are duplex and measure approximately 130 µm in length, corresponding to 5.4% of the aperture length excluding the canal. The major limb is moderately broad, lanceolate in dorsal view, and weakly curved. The accessory limb accounts for about half of the tooth width, maintains the same width along its entire length, measures roughly 0.7 of the total tooth length, and is inserted into a distinct socket on the dorsal side of the major limb.

== Distribution ==
This marine species occurs off New Caledonia.
