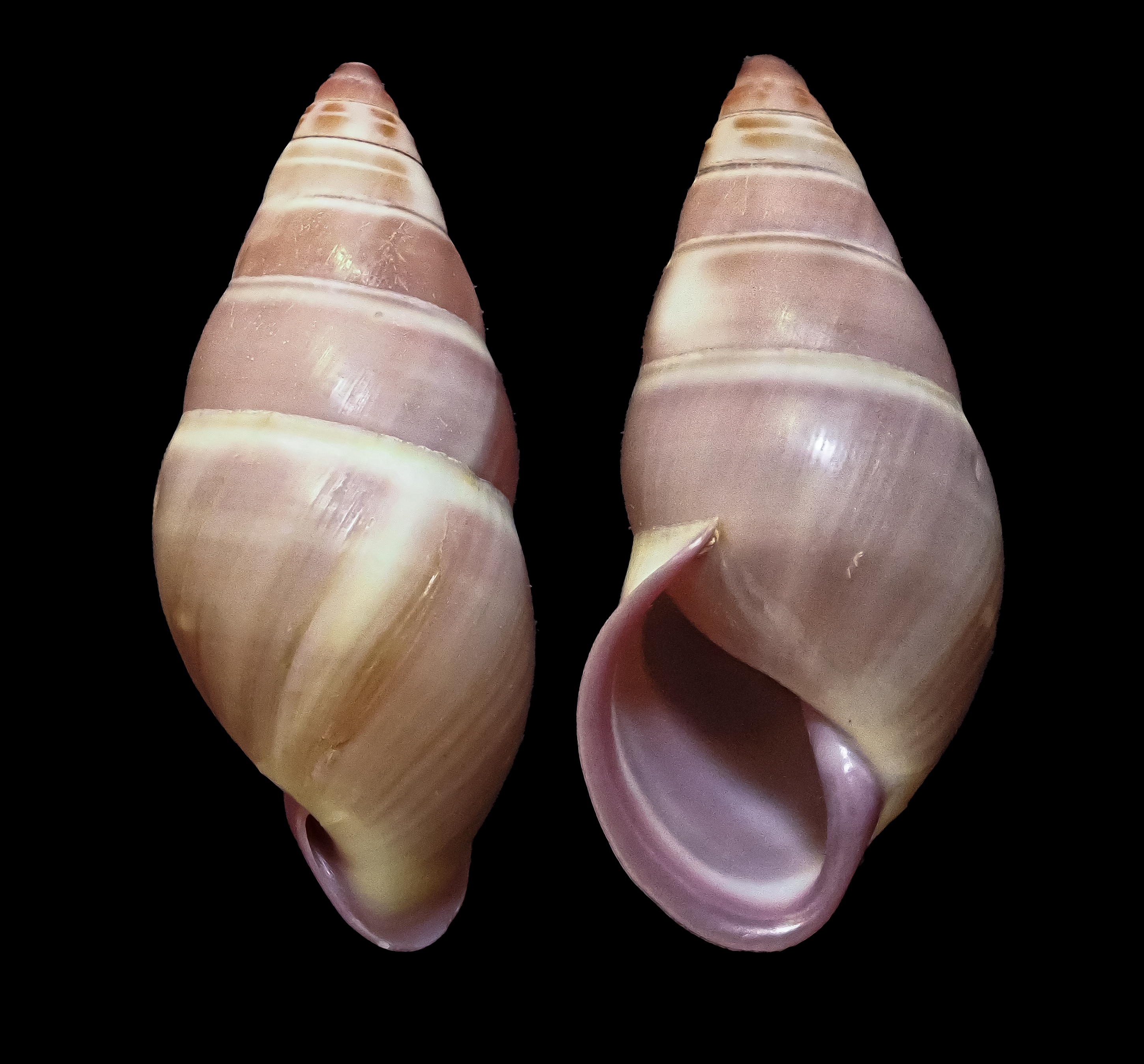
- Shell of Amphidromus reflexilabris

Scientific classification
- Kingdom: Animalia
- Phylum: Mollusca
- Class: Gastropoda
- Order: Stylommatophora
- Family: Camaenidae
- Genus: Amphidromus
- Species: A. reflexilabris

Binomial name
- Amphidromus reflexilabris Schepman, 1892

Synonyms
- Amphidromus (Amphidromus) chrisabbasi Thach, 2017 (junior synonym); Amphidromus (Amphidromus) lucsegersi Thach & Abbas, 2017 (junior synonym); Amphidromus (Amphidromus) stevehubrechti Thach & Abbas, 2017 (junior synonym); Amphidromus (Syndromus) reflexilabris Schepman, 1892 alternative representation; Amphidromus beschaueri Thach, 2018 (incorrect original spelling:...); Amphidromus lucsegersi Thach & Abbas, 2017 (junior synonym); Amphidromus stevehubrechti Thach & Abbas, 2017 (junior synonym)

= Amphidromus reflexilabris =

Species of tree snail

Amphidromus reflexilabris is a species of air-breathing tree snail, an arboreal gastropod mollusk in the family Camaenidae.

Subspecies
Amphidromus reflexilabris hanielanus B. Rensch, 1931 (taxon inquirendum)

== Description ==
The length of this sinistral shell attains 50 mm, its diameter 23.5 mm.

(Original description) The sinistral shell is elongately conical, exhibiting slight striations and is imperforated. It varies much in color, sometimes appearing yellow with green streaks, other times pale or orange-yellow, with the upper whorls displaying a yellowish or brown hue. The apex can be yellow or black-brown, and the upper whorls nearly always feature brown flames or blotches. The lower whorls commonly show a white zone beneath the sutures. Comprising six slightly convex whorls, the shell possesses an elongately-ovate aperture that is angular above and angularly rounded and slightly effused beneath, occupying, with the peristome, about half the length of the shell and having a white interior. The outer lip is strongly reflected, extending so as to reach and even partly cover the backside of the shell, forming a siphonal canal that has the appearance of a very thick peristome. The columella is thickened and, like the lip, of a pale rose-color, with its margins connected by a thin callosity.

== Distribution ==
This species occurs in Timor Island and Vietnam.
