= Vexillum martini =

Scientific classification
- Kingdom: Animalia
- Phylum: Mollusca
- Class: Gastropoda
- Subclass: Caenogastropoda
- Order: Neogastropoda
- Superfamily: Turbinelloidea
- Family: Costellariidae
- Genus: Vexillum
- Species: †V. martini

Binomial name
- †Vexillum martini Schepman, 1907

Synonyms
- † Turricula martini Schepman, 1907

Species of gastropod

Vexillum martini is an extinct species of sea snail, a marine gastropod mollusk, in the family Costellariidae, the ribbed miters.

This is an unreplaced junior homonym of † Vexillum martini (O. Boettger, 1883)

== Distribution ==
Fossils of this marine species were found in post- Tertiary strata in Sulawesi, Indonesia.
