= Vexillum minahassae =

Scientific classification
- Kingdom: Animalia
- Phylum: Mollusca
- Class: Gastropoda
- Subclass: Caenogastropoda
- Order: Neogastropoda
- Superfamily: Turbinelloidea
- Family: Costellariidae
- Genus: Vexillum
- Species: †V. minahassae

Binomial name
- †Vexillum minahassae (Schepman, 1907)

Synonyms
- † Turricula minahassae Schepman, 1907

Species of gastropod

Vexillum minahassae is an extinct species of sea snail, a marine gastropod mollusk, in the family Costellariidae, the ribbed miters.

== Distribution ==
Fossils of this marine species were found in post- Tertiary strata in Sulawesi, Indonesia.
