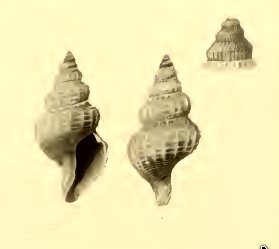
- Neopleurotomoides rufoapicata

Scientific classification
- Kingdom: Animalia
- Phylum: Mollusca
- Class: Gastropoda
- Subclass: Caenogastropoda
- Order: Neogastropoda
- Superfamily: Conoidea
- Family: Raphitomidae
- Genus: Neopleurotomoides; Shuto, 1971

Type species
- Clathurella rufoapicata Schepman, 1913

Species
- See text

= Neopleurotomoides =

Genus of gastropods

Neopleurotomoides is a genus of sea snails, marine gastropod mollusks in the family Raphitomidae.

== Species ==
Species within the genus Neopleurotomoides include:

- Neopleurotomoides aembe Figueira & Absalão, 2012
- Neopleurotomoides callembryon (Dautzenberg & Fischer, 1896)
- Neopleurotomoides distinctus Bouchet & Warén, 1980
- Neopleurotomoides rufoapicata (Schepman, 1913)

Species brought into synonymy

- Neopleurotomoides callembyron (Dautzenberg & Fischer, 1896): synonym of Neopleurotomoides callembryon (Dautzenberg & Fischer, 1896)
- Neopleurotomoides distincta Bouchet & Waren, 1980: synonym of Neopleurotomoides distinctus Bouchet & Warén, 1980 (wrong grammatical agreement of species name)
