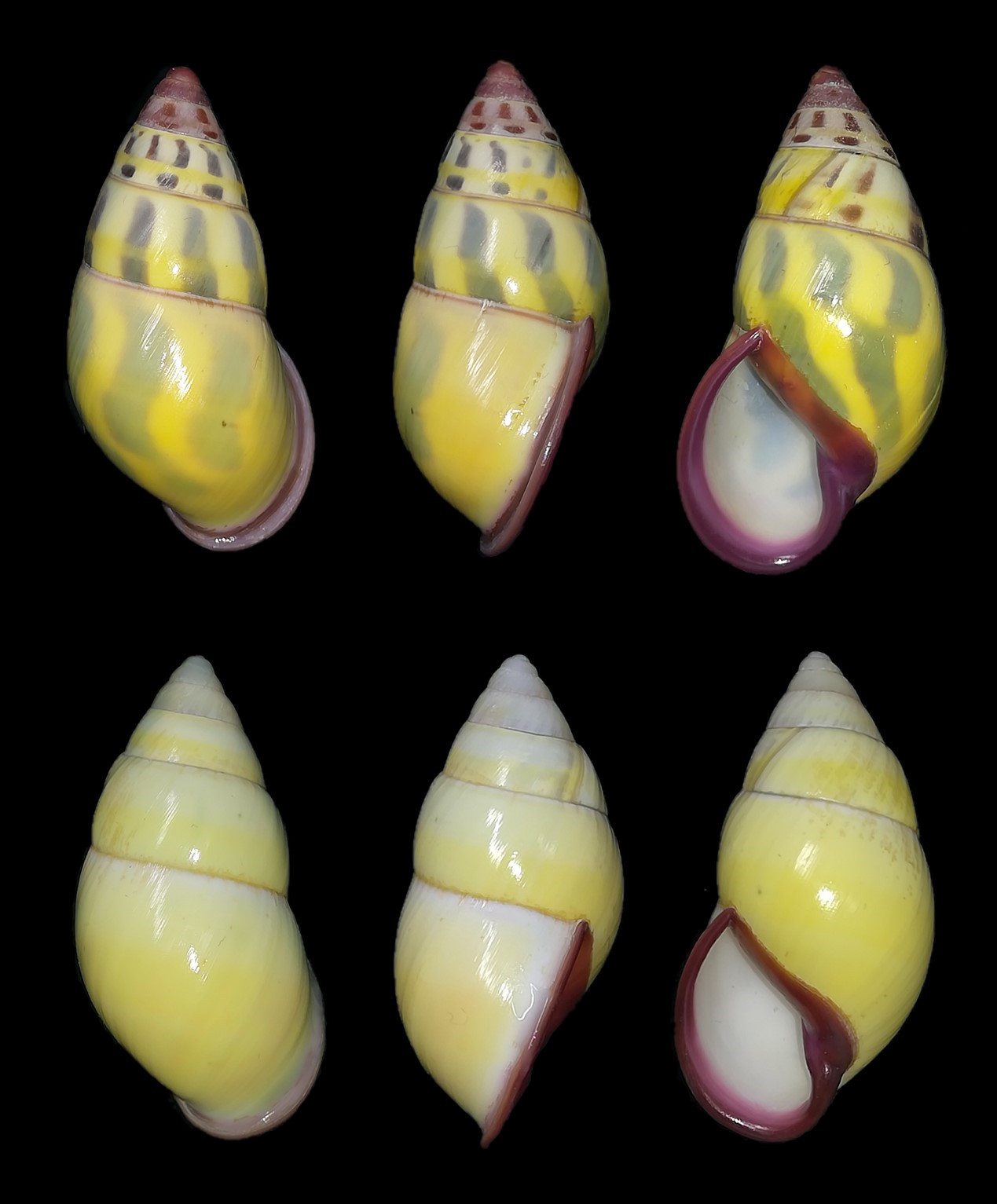
- Shell of Amphidromus latestrigatus

Scientific classification
- Kingdom: Animalia
- Phylum: Mollusca
- Class: Gastropoda
- Order: Stylommatophora
- Family: Camaenidae
- Genus: Amphidromus
- Species: A. latestrigatus

Binomial name
- Amphidromus latestrigatus M.M. Schepman, 1892

Synonyms
- Amphidromus (Syndromus) latestrigatus Schepman, 1892 alternative representation

= Amphidromus latestrigatus =

Species of snail

Amphidromus latestrigatus is a species of air-breathing land snail, a terrestrial pulmonate gastropod mollusc in the family Camaenidae.

== Description ==
The species names and described by Matteheus Marinus Schepman in 1892.

The length of the shell attains 37 mm, its diameter 19 mm.

(Original description) The shell is sinistral and ovately-conical, presenting a nearly smooth surface and a perforation. The apical whorl exhibits a blackish-brown color, followed by a rose-colored next whorl. The subsequent whorls appear white, then transition to pale yellow, with the body whorl being a darker yellow. The total number of whorls is about 6 2/3. These whorls are slightly convex, with the last four displaying broad brown flames, which become greenish-gray on the body whorl and are often confluent towards the base. The sutures feature a narrow white margin, sometimes accompanied by a blackish one (absent in one specimen). The aperture is ovately oblong, angular above, and rounded beneath, occupying less than half the length of the shell and showing a bluish-white interior. The outer lip is moderately expanded. The columella appears nearly straight and, like the lip, dark rose-colored, with the margins connected by a thin callosity of the same color.

== Distribution ==
It is found in Indonesia and lives on trees bushes.
