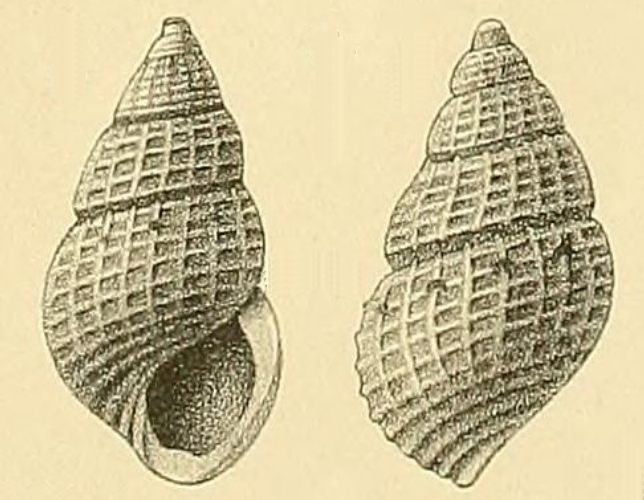
- Shell of Alvania kwandangensis (holotype)

Scientific classification
- Kingdom: Animalia
- Phylum: Mollusca
- Class: Gastropoda
- Subclass: Caenogastropoda
- Order: Littorinimorpha
- Superfamily: Rissooidea
- Family: Rissoidae
- Genus: Alvania
- Species: A. kwandangensis

Binomial name
- Alvania kwandangensis (Schepman, 1909)

Synonyms
- Rissoia kwandangensis Schepman, 1909 superseded combination

= Alvania kwandangensis =

Species of gastropod

Alvania kwandangensis is a species of small sea snail, a marine gastropod mollusk or micromollusk in the family Rissoidae.

== Description ==
The length of the shell attains 2.5 mm, its diameter 1.25 mm.

(Original description) The small, conic-oval shell is solid and opaque. It contains about 6, slightly convex, whorls, separated by a deep suture. The colour of the shell is whitish, with spiral rows of purple-brown spots.

The whorls of the protoconch are smooth. The sculpture of the subsequent whorls consists of rather thin, straight ribs, about 18 on the body whorl. They are crossed by spiral ridges, of which there are 6 on the penultimate whorl and 11 on the last one, the sixth running just in a channel above the suture. This sculpture renders the shell cancellated. Moreover, fine growth-striae make their appearance in the squares remaining in the interstices of this sculpture. Of the brown spots the upper spiral row runs a little below the suture, on the alternating ribs, and five fainter ones, on the basal part of the body whorl. The aperture is rounded oval and slightly angular above. The outer margin is regularly curved, with a strong varix externally. The columellar margin is reflected over the columella and the base. The varix is adorned with two larger brown spots, one at the upper and one at the basal part.

== Distribution ==
This species occurs off North Sulawesi, Indonesia.
