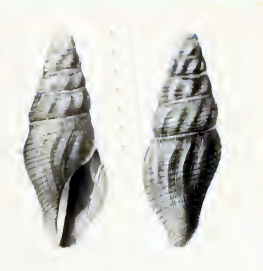
- Original image of a shell of Crassispira rubidofusca

Scientific classification
- Kingdom: Animalia
- Phylum: Mollusca
- Class: Gastropoda
- Subclass: Caenogastropoda
- Order: Neogastropoda
- Superfamily: Conoidea
- Family: Pseudomelatomidae
- Genus: Crassispira
- Species: C. rubidofusca

Binomial name
- Crassispira rubidofusca (Schepman, 1913)

Synonyms
- Drillia rubidofusca Schepman, 1913

= Crassispira rubidofusca =

Species of gastropod

Crassispira rubidofusca is a species of sea snail, a marine gastropod mollusk in the family Pseudomelatomidae.

== Description ==
The length of the shell attains 20 mm, its diameter 6¼ mm.

(Original description) The fusiform, rather solid shell is uniformly red-brown, lighter behind peristome and at the sutural sinus, and with orange base. It contains 6 whorls, (the apex is broken-, the number of whorls may have been at least 10) rather convex, slightly excavated below the conspicuous suture, which is accompanied by an inconspicuous infrasutural thread. The sculpture consists of somewhat oblique ribs, nearly crossing the entire whorl in the upper ones, but becoming obsolete in the infrasutural depression of the lower whorls. There are about 15 ribs on the body whorl, of which the ventral ones are obsolete, that behind the peristome are very strong and varix-like. Moreover, the shell is covered with fine growth striae and very fine spiral striae, only visible under a lens. Six spiral lirae cross the ribs, in most cases with intermediate, much finer lirae and 3 to 4 very faint ones in the excavation. On the body whorl the number of principal lirae amounts to 20. The aperture is oblong, narrow, with a thin peristome, protracted about the middle, with a deep, rather wide sinus above . The columellar side contains a thick layer of enamel, with a flat, whitish tubercle above at the sinus, straight below, the peristome is margined with red-brown interiorly, with a light violet layer of enamel behind, in the depth again red-brown. The upper part of the columellar layer is red-brown. The siphonal canal is slightly upturned.

== Distribution ==
This marine species occurs of Western Sumatra, Indonesia.
