= Guttula blanda =

Scientific classification
- Kingdom: Animalia
- Phylum: Mollusca
- Class: Gastropoda
- Subclass: Vetigastropoda
- Family: Seguenziidae
- Genus: Guttula
- Species: G. blanda

Binomial name
- Guttula blanda Barnard, 1963

Species of gastropod

Guttula blanda is a species of extremely small deep water sea snail, a marine gastropod mollusc in the family Seguenziidae.
