= Chryseofusus chrysodomoides =

Scientific classification
- Kingdom: Animalia
- Phylum: Mollusca
- Class: Gastropoda
- Subclass: Caenogastropoda
- Order: Neogastropoda
- Family: Fasciolariidae
- Genus: Chryseofusus
- Species: C. chrysodomoides

Binomial name
- Chryseofusus chrysodomoides (Schepman, 1911)

Synonyms
- Fusinus chrysodomoides (Schepman, 1911); Fusus chrysodomoides Schepman, 1911; Manaria insularis Okutani, 1968

Species of gastropod

Chryseofusus chrysodomoides is a species of sea snail, a marine gastropod mollusk in the family Fasciolariidae, the spindle snails, the tulip snails and their allies.
