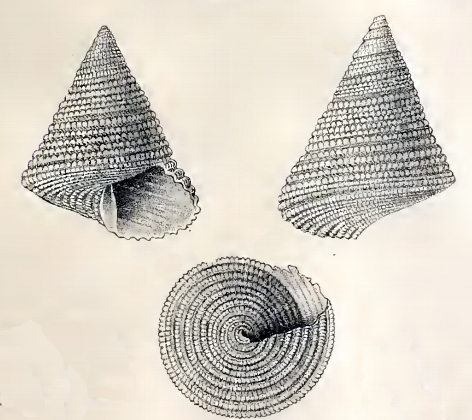
- Original drawing with three views of a shell of Calliostoma simplex

Scientific classification
- Kingdom: Animalia
- Phylum: Mollusca
- Class: Gastropoda
- Subclass: Vetigastropoda
- Order: Trochida
- Family: Calliostomatidae
- Genus: Calliostoma
- Species: C. simplex

Binomial name
- Calliostoma simplex Schepman, 1908

Synonyms
- Calliostoma (Tristichotrochus) simplex M.M. Schepman, 1908

= Calliostoma simplex =

Species of gastropod

Calliostoma simplex is a species of sea snail, a marine gastropod mollusk in the family Calliostomatidae.

Some authors place this taxon in the subgenus Calliostoma (Fautor)

== Description ==
(Original description by M.M. Schepman) The height of the shell attains 17 mm. The imperforate shell has an elevated conical shape. It is, unicoloured, and yellowish. The 7½ whorls are slightly convex, with spiral lirae, increasing from 2 on the upper body whorl, to 6 on the penultimate and 7 on the upper surface of the ultimate one. The suture is not deep but distinct, accompanied by the upper part of a nearly covered spiral. The spirals are closely beset with compressed beads. The upper row of each whorl is slightly the largest. The body whorl is angular, keeled by the last spiral. The base of the shell is nearly flat, with 10 conspicuous, beaded spirals and a few very thin ones near the aperture. Moreover, the whole shell is covered with oblique, undulating, slightly laminar, radiating striae, very distinct on the base. The aperture is subquadrate. The outer margin is thin, a little convex, with 5 spiral grooves. The basal margin is convex. The columella is cylindrical, slightly concave, patulous but not toothed at the base, interiorly ending in a flat layer of nacre, running over the basal margin.

== Distribution ==
This marine species occurs off Indonesia and the Philippines.
