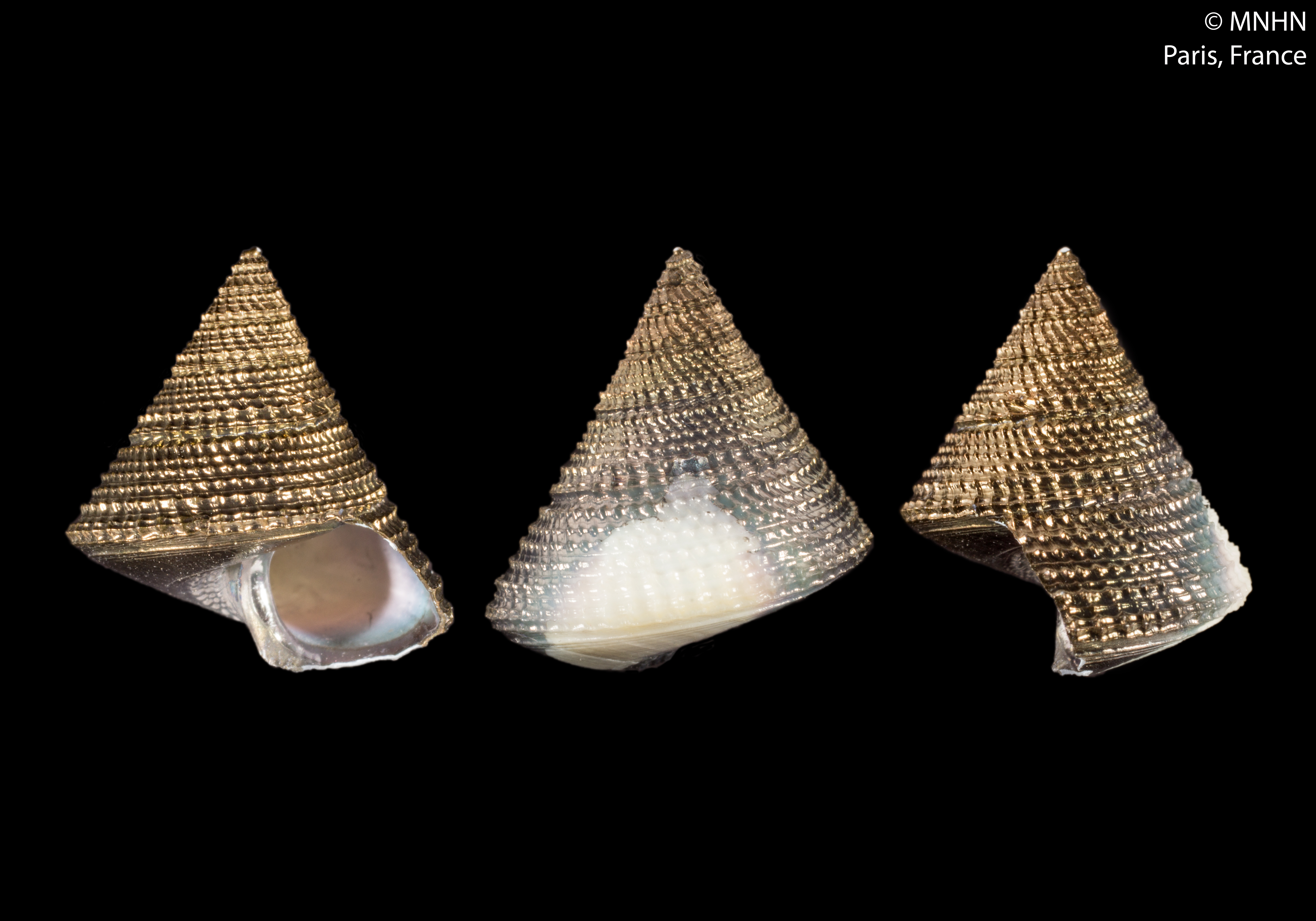
- Shell of Bathyfautor caledonicus (holotype at MNHN, Paris)

Scientific classification
- Kingdom: Animalia
- Phylum: Mollusca
- Class: Gastropoda
- Subclass: Vetigastropoda
- Order: Trochida
- Superfamily: Trochoidea
- Family: Calliostomatidae
- Genus: Bathyfautor
- Species: B. caledonicus

Binomial name
- Bathyfautor caledonicus Marshall, 1995

Synonyms
- Bathyfautor caledonicum sic

= Bathyfautor caledonicus =

Species of gastropod

Bathyfautor caledonicus is a species of sea snail, a marine gastropod mollusk in the family Calliostomatidae.

== Distribution ==
This marine species occurs off New Caledonia.
