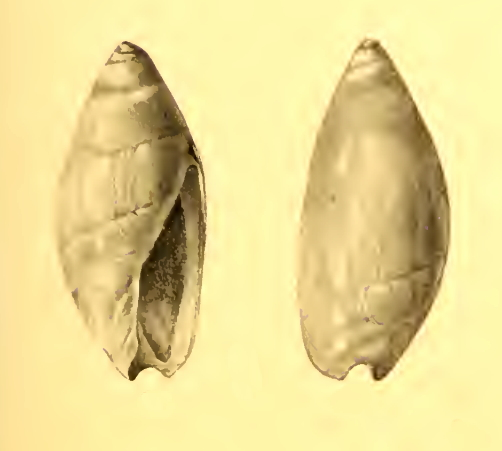
- Shell of Amalda edgariana (holotype)

Scientific classification
- Kingdom: Animalia
- Phylum: Mollusca
- Class: Gastropoda
- Subclass: Caenogastropoda
- Order: Neogastropoda
- Family: Ancillariidae
- Genus: Amalda
- Species: A. edgariana

Binomial name
- Amalda edgariana (Schepman, 1911)

Synonyms
- Ancilla edgariana Schepman, 1911 (original combination)

= Amalda edgariana =

Species of gastropod

Amalda edgariana is a species of sea snail, a marine gastropod mollusk in the family Ancillariidae.

== Description ==
The length of the shell attains 9 mm, its diameter 4 mm.

(Original description) The shell is elongately ovate, with the lower whorls displaying a faint yellowish-white hue, bordered by white enamel above and below. The uppermost whorls are porcelain-like white, showing traces of a brown line. The shell consists of about four whorls, with the spire covered by a relatively thick layer of enamel that obscures the suture, resulting in a somewhat blunt spire with convex outlines.

The sculpture on the body whorl features extremely fine growth striae, visible only under magnification, and faint traces of microscopic spiral striae. These striae appear as if scratched by an exceptionally fine needle on the enamel surface. A shallow groove (sulcus) runs just above the white balteus, ending in a slight tooth-like structure, which may become more pronounced in older specimens. Another sulcus is located near the base.

The aperture is elongated, with a thin outer margin, possibly indicating a younger specimen, and the columellar margin shows two folds. The basal sinus is moderately wide. The operculum is corneous.

== Distribution ==
This species occurs in the Seram Sea, Indonesia.
