= Guttula galatheae =

Scientific classification
- Kingdom: Animalia
- Phylum: Mollusca
- Class: Gastropoda
- Subclass: Vetigastropoda
- Family: Seguenziidae
- Genus: Guttula
- Species: G. galatheae

Binomial name
- Guttula galatheae Knudsen, 1964

Species of gastropod

Guttula galatheae is a species of sea snail, a marine gastropod mollusc in the family Seguenziidae.

== Description ==
The height of the shell varies between 3.5 mm and 4 mm.

== Distribution ==
This marine species occurs off New Zealand, in the Kermadec Trench at depths between 6,660 m and 6,770 m.
