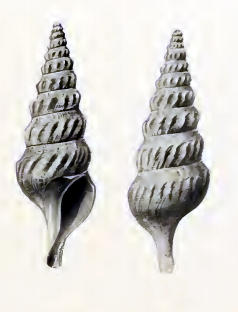
- Original image of a shell of Leucosyrinx melvilli

Scientific classification
- Kingdom: Animalia
- Phylum: Mollusca
- Class: Gastropoda
- Subclass: Caenogastropoda
- Order: Neogastropoda
- Superfamily: Conoidea
- Family: Pseudomelatomidae
- Genus: Leucosyrinx
- Species: L. melvilli

Binomial name
- Leucosyrinx melvilli (Schepman, 1913)

Synonyms
- Comitas melvilli (Schepman, 1913) ·; Surcula melvilli Schepman, 1913

= Leucosyrinx melvilli =

Species of gastropod

Leucosyrinx melvilli is a species of sea snail, a marine gastropod mollusc in the family Pseudomelatomidae, the turrids and allies.

== Description ==
The length of the shell attains 62 mm, its diameter 20 mm.

(Original description) The thin, shortly fusiform shell has a long spire. It is light yellowish red-brown. The protoconch is wanting. The 11 subsequent whorls are angularly convex, concave above, lower part with very oblique, somewhat irregular ribs, forming small tubercles on the upper whorls, thick folds on the lower ones. These ribs are not visible in the excavation, their number is 22 on the body whorl. tTe whole shell is covered with fine growth striae, intermingled with some coarser ones and very numerous, waved, spiral lirae, as well on the ribs as in the interstices and in the subsutural excavation. The body whorl is rapidly attenuated below periphery, ending in a rather short, relatively very slender siphonal canal, which is nearly white and sculptured with spirals in the same manner as the rest of shell. The aperture is oval, with a blunt angle above. The peristome is thin, fragile, the sinus according to growth lines probably wide, but not very deep. The columellar margin is regularly curved, but suddenly directed to the left, at the entrance of the siphonal canal, which is contortedly directed to the left. The columellar margin shows a white layer of enamel. The interior of the aperture is brown and smooth.

This species exhibits similarities to Leucosyrinx jeedara from Australia, albeit with notable differences in size (up to 62 mm versus 31 mm), a lower body whorl, a taller spire, and a cream coloration. Given that the anal sinus shape aligns more closely with species of Leucosyrinx than with Comitas, transferring the species to the former genus was proposed.

== Distribution ==
This marine species occurs in the Timor Sea, near Indonesia at a depth of 918 m.
