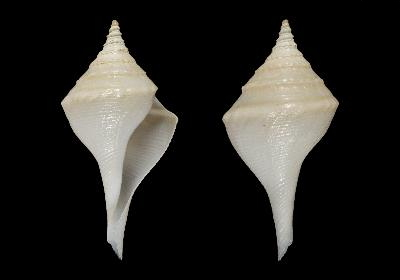
- Shell of Clavosurcula schepmani (paratype at MNHN, Paris)

Scientific classification
- Kingdom: Animalia
- Phylum: Mollusca
- Class: Gastropoda
- Subclass: Caenogastropoda
- Order: Neogastropoda
- Superfamily: Conoidea
- Family: Cochlespiridae
- Genus: Clavosurcula
- Species: C. schepmani

Binomial name
- Clavosurcula schepmani Sysoev, 1997

= Clavosurcula schepmani =

Species of gastropod

Clavosurcula schepmani is a species of sea snail, a marine gastropod mollusk in the family Cochlespiridae.

The specific name schepmani is in honor of Dutch malacologist Mattheus Marinus Schepman.

== Description ==
The length of the shell attains 25.5 mm, its diameter 12.2 mm.

== Distribution ==
This marine species occurs off Eastern Indonesia.
