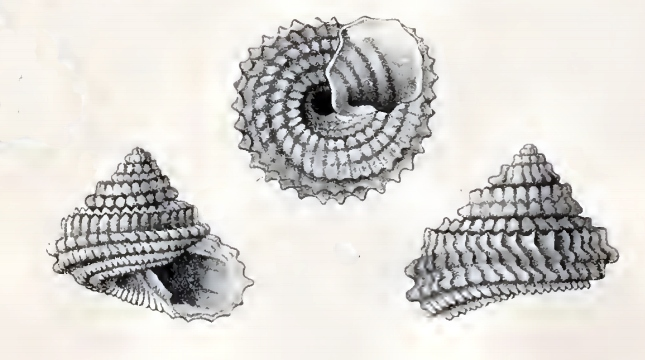
- Original drawing with three views of a shell of Calliotropis muricata

Scientific classification
- Kingdom: Animalia
- Phylum: Mollusca
- Class: Gastropoda
- Subclass: Vetigastropoda
- Family: Calliotropidae
- Genus: Calliotropis
- Species: C. muricata

Binomial name
- Calliotropis muricata (Schepman, 1908)

Synonyms
- Solariellopsis muricata Schepman, 1908 (original combination)

= Calliotropis muricata =

Species of gastropod

Calliotropis muricata is a species of sea snail, a marine gastropod mollusk in the family Eucyclidae.

== Description ==
(Original description by Schepman) The shell grows to a height of 4¾ mm. The yellowish-white shell has a conical shape with a rounded but keeled periphery and a convex base. It is umbilicate. The 6 whorls are convex. The nucleus is wanting. The sculpture consists on the upper two whorls, of nearly simple concentric ribs. On the next two, the ribs are crossed by two spiral lirae, producing short tubercles on the ribs, where they cross them. The last two whorls have plicae near the channelled suture, with a row of tubercles, bordering on the infrasutural sulcus. Another similar row, a little lower on the concentric ribs and a third, consists of compressed tubercles, (about 30 on the last whorl) near the base of the whorls. These tubercles, especially those of the peripheral row, are connected by spiral lirae, of which the lowest represents the keel. The convex base is sculptured by four spiral cords, of which that near the keel, bears strong, compressed tubercles. Those of the more central cord are smaller, and the innermost two are strongly beaded, the inner one borders the umbilicus. Moreover, the base is sculptured by irregular, radiating riblets and like the upper part, by microscopic striae. The funnel-shaped umbilicus is pervious, concentrically striated and plicated, and with two beaded spirals near the base. Its largest diameter is about 2/5 of the shell. The aperture is subcircular. The outer and basal margin have short plicae in the interior. The concave columella is reflected over the umbilicus, with two denticles near its base, of which the basal one is the largest. The parietal wall has a layer of enamel, connecting the margins, slightly projected over the umbilicus. Its margin is a little thickened. The interior of the aperture is inconspicuously nacreous.

== Distribution ==
This marine species occurs off the Sunda Islands, Indonesia.
