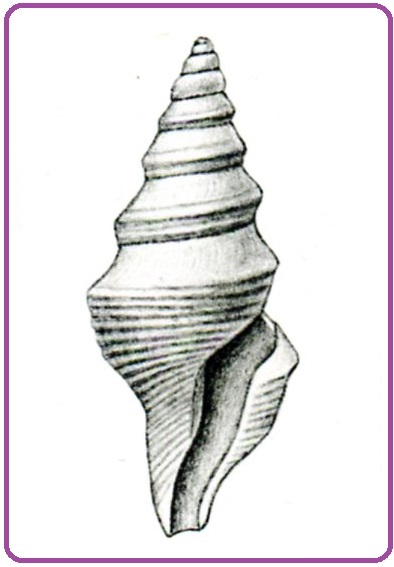
- A drawing of the shell of Pagodidaphne schepmani

Scientific classification
- Kingdom: Animalia
- Phylum: Mollusca
- Class: Gastropoda
- Subclass: Caenogastropoda
- Order: Neogastropoda
- Superfamily: Conoidea
- Family: Raphitomidae
- Genus: Pagodidaphne
- Species: P. schepmani

Binomial name
- Pagodidaphne schepmani (Thiele, 1925)

Synonyms
- Clathurella schepmani Thiele, 1925

= Pagodidaphne schepmani =

Species of gastropod

Pagodidaphne schepmani is a species of sea snail, a marine gastropod mollusk in the family Raphitomidae.

The specific name schepmani is in honor of Dutch malacologist Mattheus Marinus Schepman.

== Description ==
The height of the shell attains 4.5 mm, its diameter 1.9 mm.

== Distribution ==
This marine species occurs off Somalia, East Africa.
