= Megadenus oneirophantae =

Scientific classification
- Kingdom: Animalia
- Phylum: Mollusca
- Class: Gastropoda
- Subclass: Caenogastropoda
- Order: Littorinimorpha
- Family: Eulimidae
- Genus: Megadenus
- Species: M. oneirophantae

Binomial name
- Megadenus oneirophantae Bouchet & Lützen, 1980

Species of gastropod

Megadenus oneirophantae is a species of sea snail, a marine gastropod mollusk in the family Eulimidae.
