= Pagodidaphne colmani =

Scientific classification
- Kingdom: Animalia
- Phylum: Mollusca
- Class: Gastropoda
- Subclass: Caenogastropoda
- Order: Neogastropoda
- Superfamily: Conoidea
- Family: Raphitomidae
- Genus: Pagodidaphne
- Species: P. colmani

Binomial name
- Pagodidaphne colmani Shuto, 1983

Species of gastropod

Pagodidaphne colmani is a species of sea snail, a marine gastropod mollusk in the family Raphitomidae.

== Distribution ==
This marine species is endemic to Australia and occurs off the Northern Territory.
