= Oliva rufofulgurata =

Scientific classification
- Kingdom: Animalia
- Phylum: Mollusca
- Class: Gastropoda
- Subclass: Caenogastropoda
- Order: Neogastropoda
- Family: Olividae
- Genus: Oliva
- Species: O. rufofulgurata

Binomial name
- Oliva rufofulgurata Schepman, 1904

Species of gastropod

Oliva rufofulgurata is a species of sea snail, a marine gastropod mollusk in the family Olividae, the olives. It has been recorded in the Philippines, Indonesia and the Solomon Islands.
