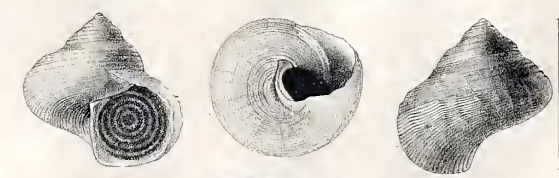
- Original drawing with three views of a shell of Calliostoma virgo

Scientific classification
- Kingdom: Animalia
- Phylum: Mollusca
- Class: Gastropoda
- Subclass: Vetigastropoda
- Order: Trochida
- Family: Calliostomatidae
- Genus: Calliostoma
- Species: C. virgo

Binomial name
- Calliostoma virgo Schepman, 1908

Synonyms
- Calliostoma (Astele) virgo Schepman, 1908

= Calliostoma virgo =

Species of gastropod

Calliostoma virgo is a species of sea snail, a marine gastropod mollusk in the family Calliostomatidae.

== Description ==
(Original description by M.M. Schepman) The height of the shell attains 30 mm (1.2 in). The white, perforated shell has a conoidal shape. The 6½ whorls are convex, the lower ones slightly concave below the suture. The nucleus is rather smooth, next whorls contain from 2 to 4 weak spiral lirae below the suture, crossed by weaker radiating ribs, and with 2 or 3 stronger lirae on the lower part of each whorl, with a faint intermediate one, on the penultimate and the body whorl. The spiral lirae increase in number, to about 10 weaker spirals on the upper part and 4 or 5 stronger ones at the lower part of the upper surface, and numerous intermediate ones. Below the rounded periphery appear two or three more remote lirae, with intermediate ones and numerous, regular, flatter lirae on the convex basal part, becoming broader towards the umbilicus. The whole shell is crossed by oblique, fine, but conspicuous growth-striae. The umbilicus is narrow, in the front view concealed by the columellar margin, with rather smooth walls. The aperture is rounded-quadrangular. The thin upper margin is curved and runs uninterruptedly in the basal margin. The columellar margin is partly reflected over the umbilicus. The interior of the aperture is nacreous, with a few shallow grooves, corresponding to the stronger external lirae. The operculum is brown. Its outer surface is concave, many-whorled, each whorl divided in two parts, a central one, with oblique, strong and an external part with nearly perpendicular, fine striae.

== Distribution ==
This marine species occurs off Sulawesi, Indonesia.
