= Netherlands Malacological Society =

The Nederlandse Malacologische Vereniging (NMV), known in English as the Netherlands Malacological Society or the Dutch Malacological Society, is a non-profit organisation based in the Netherlands. It is a society devoted to malacology (the study of molluscs) as well as conchology (the study of mollusc shells). The NMV was founded in 1934 and includes both professional and amateur members. The NMV created a European malacological society which later became the global society Unitas Malacologica.

== Periodicals ==
The society publishes three periodicals: the scientific journal Basteria, Vita Malacologica (a twice-annual themed supplement to Basteria published only in English), and the NMV news journal Spirula (formerly known as Correspondentieblad).

== Books ==
In commemoration of the 75th anniversary of the founding of the society, the NMV published two books. One was published in 2009 and was entitled, Schitterende schelpen en slijmerige slakken. 75 jaar NMV: malacologie als hobby en professie, ("Beautiful snails and slimy slugs. 75 years of NMV: malacology as a hobby and profession"). The editors were Gerhard C. Cadee, Sylvia van Leeuwen, and Jan Johan ter Poorten.

The other book, published in English in 2010, was about the research and collection of Mattheus Marinus Schepman, the Dutch malacologist.
