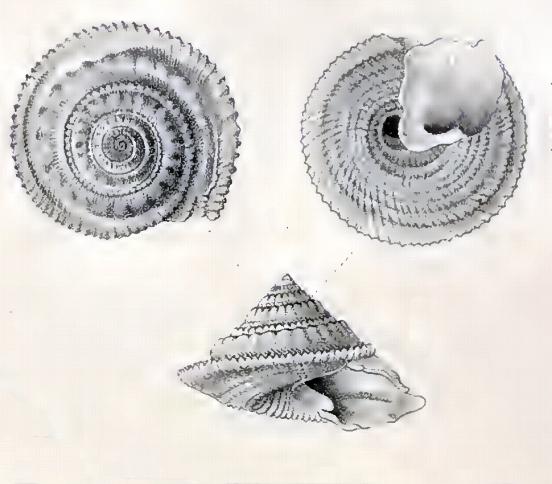
- Three views of a shell of Calliotropis limbifera

Scientific classification
- Kingdom: Animalia
- Phylum: Mollusca
- Class: Gastropoda
- Subclass: Vetigastropoda
- Family: Calliotropidae
- Genus: Calliotropis
- Species: C. limbifera

Binomial name
- Calliotropis limbifera (Schepman, 1908)

Synonyms
- Solariellopsis limbifera Schepman, 1908 (original combination)

= Calliotropis limbifera =

Species of gastropod

Calliotropis limbifera is a species of sea snail, a marine gastropod mollusk in the family Eucyclidae.

== Description ==
(Original description by Schepman) The shell reaches a length of 8 mm. The yellowish-white, the conical shell is moderately depressed and slightly convex below. It has a very strong, rounded keel, and is widely umbilicate. The spire consists of 6 1/2 whorls. The nucleus is smooth. The upper whorls contain concentric ribs and traces of one or two spiral lirae, producing small tubercles on the ribs. The whorls are flattened near the suture. Above the upper row of tubercles, this depression is roughened by small lamellae. The lower part of the whorls is slightly convex. On the lower whorls, the sculpture consists of a row of rather strong tubercles at some distance from the suture, the flattened space between suture and tubercles is also lamelliferous. The second row of smaller tubercles makes its appearance, and becomes more conspicuous on the body whorl. At some distance from the lower suture, a spiral rib, with inconspicuous beads, is crossed by irregular, waved lamellae, which spread on the large keel. This keel is flat above, rounded at its periphery, and adorned by sharp, compressed folds, which make it crenulated. The base of the shell is sculptured by five beaded spirals, of which the outer one, placed at some distance from the margin, and the most central one, bordering the umbilicus are double. The whole base is covered by radiating very oblique riblets. The funnel-shaped umbilicus is pervious. It has two spiral lirae, of which the lower one is beaded, and radiating riblike striae. Its largest diameter is about 1 1/3 of the base. The aperture is rhombic. The convex, outer margin is rather thin, internally lirate, with short folds between the lirae. The convex basal margin is short, and internally with a few lirae. The broad columella is concave, with a conspicuous fold near the base and a small denticle above it. Its upper part is connected to the outer margin by a conspicuous layer of enamel, with thickened margin, and a free ear-shaped projection, covering part of the umbilicus.

== Distribution ==
This species occurs in the Sulu Sea, the Philippines; also off New Caledonia.
