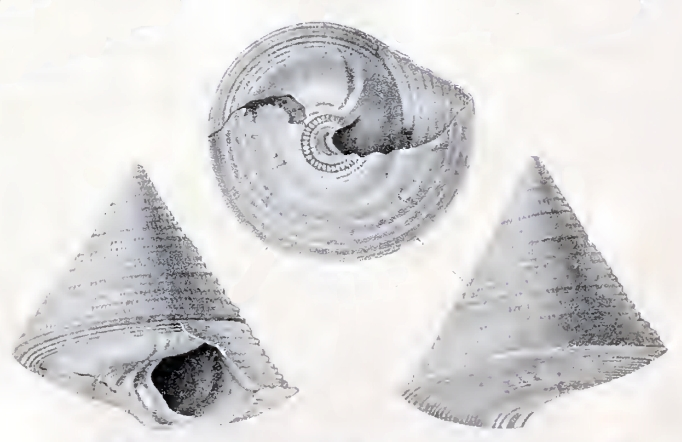
- Drawing with three views of a shell of Bathyfautor multispinosus

Scientific classification
- Kingdom: Animalia
- Phylum: Mollusca
- Class: Gastropoda
- Subclass: Vetigastropoda
- Order: Trochida
- Superfamily: Trochoidea
- Family: Calliostomatidae
- Genus: Bathyfautor; Marshall, 1995

Type species
- Bathyfautor rapuhia B. A. Marshall, 1995

= Bathyfautor =

Genus of gastropods

Bathyfautor is a genus of sea snails, marine gastropod mollusks in the family Calliostomatidae.

== Species ==
Species within the genus Bathyfautor include:

- Bathyfautor caledonicus Marshall, 1995
- Bathyfautor coriolis Marshall, 1995
- Bathyfautor multispinosus (Schepman, 1908)
- Bathyfautor rapuhia Marshall, 1995

Species brought into synonymy

- Bathyfautor caledonicum [sic]: synonym of Bathyfautor caledonicus Marshall, 1995
- Bathyfautor multispinosum [sic]: synonym of Bathyfautor multispinosus (Schepman, 1908)
