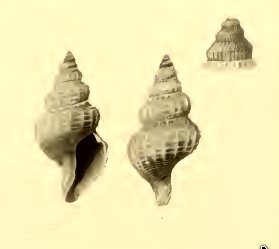
- Original image of a shell and protoconch of Neopleurotomoides rufoapicata

Scientific classification
- Kingdom: Animalia
- Phylum: Mollusca
- Class: Gastropoda
- Subclass: Caenogastropoda
- Order: Neogastropoda
- Superfamily: Conoidea
- Family: Raphitomidae
- Genus: Neopleurotomoides
- Species: N. rufoapicata

Binomial name
- Neopleurotomoides rufoapicata (Schepman, 1913)

Synonyms
- Clathurella rufoapicata Schepman, 1913

= Neopleurotomoides rufoapicata =

Species of gastropod

Neopleurotomoides rufoapicata is a species of sea snail, a marine gastropod mollusk in the family Raphitomidae.

== Description ==
The length of the shell attains 7.5 mm, its diameter 3.5 mm.

(Original description) The thin, ovate shell has a short siphonal canal. It is pellucid, white, with a rufous apex. The shell containsabout 7½ whorls (uppermost top damaged) of which about 3½ form the rufous protoconch, which is angular by a strong keel, and crossed by axial riblets The subsequent whorls are very convex, with a deep suture and an excavation below it The sculpture consists of rounded, axial ribs, narrower than the interstices, 18 in number on the body whorl, ending at the excavation and disappearing on the base of the body whorl, and spiral lirae, of which 4 principal ones on penultimate whorl, which make the ribs slightly tubercled, and a few finer ones in the excavation and in many of the interstices Moreover fine growth lines, strong in the excavation are visible. The aperture is roundedly oval, bluntly angular above, below with a rather narrow, short siphonal canal The peristome is broken, probably with a shallow sinus above, (according to the growth lines) Thecolumellar margin is concave above, then straight, directed to the left along the siphonal canal.

== Distribution ==
This marine species occurs in the Ceram Sea, Indonesia, and off the Philippines
