= Megadenus holothuricola =

Scientific classification
- Kingdom: Animalia
- Phylum: Mollusca
- Class: Gastropoda
- Subclass: Caenogastropoda
- Order: Littorinimorpha
- Family: Eulimidae
- Genus: Megadenus
- Species: M. holothuricola

Binomial name
- Megadenus holothuricola Rosen, 1910

Species of gastropod

Megadenus holothuricola is a species of sea snail, a marine gastropod mollusk in the family Eulimidae.
