= Neopleurotomoides distinctus =

Scientific classification
- Kingdom: Animalia
- Phylum: Mollusca
- Class: Gastropoda
- Subclass: Caenogastropoda
- Order: Neogastropoda
- Superfamily: Conoidea
- Family: Raphitomidae
- Genus: Neopleurotomoides
- Species: N. distinctus

Binomial name
- Neopleurotomoides distinctus Bouchet & Warén, 1980

Synonyms
- Neopleurotomoides distincta Bouchet & Warén, 1980 (wrong grammatical agreement of species name)

Species of gastropod

Neopleurotomoides distinctus is a species of sea snail, a marine gastropod mollusk in the family Raphitomidae.

== Distribution ==
This marine species occurs off Northwest France; also in the Mediterranean Sea, in the Ibero-Moroccan Gulf.
