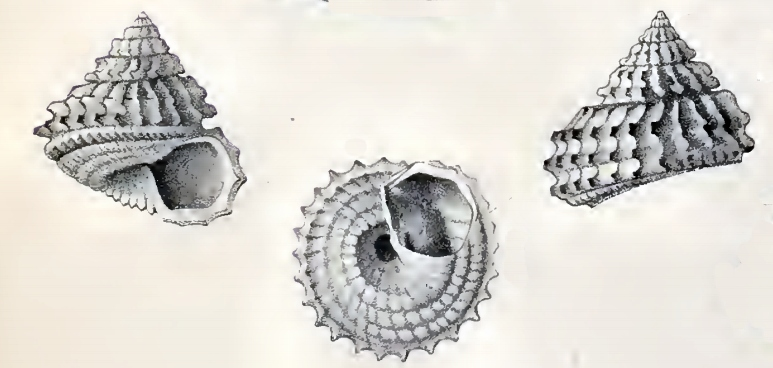
- Original drawing with three views of a shell of Calliotropis multisquamosa

Scientific classification
- Kingdom: Animalia
- Phylum: Mollusca
- Class: Gastropoda
- Subclass: Vetigastropoda
- Family: Calliotropidae
- Genus: Calliotropis
- Species: C. multisquamosa

Binomial name
- Calliotropis multisquamosa (Schepman, 1908)

Synonyms
- Solariellopsis multisquamosa Schepman, 1908 (original combination)

= Calliotropis multisquamosa =

Species of gastropod

Calliotropis multisquamosa is a species of sea snail, a marine gastropod mollusk in the family Eucyclidae.

== Description ==
The shell grows to a height of 5.5 mm. The shell has a conical shape with rounded periphery and a slightly convex base, umbilicated, white, scarcely with a yellowish tinge. The 6 1/2 whorls are convex. The nucleus is smooth, the subsequent whorl has concentric ribs. On the lower whorls the sculpture consists of radiating ribs, with a row of compressed tubercles, at some distance from the channelled suture, which disappear on the upper whorls. These ribs are crossed by 2 spiral cords, with short, hollow scales, about 25 in number on the body whorl. On the last, rounded whorl, the base is bordered by a third row of smaller scales. The base is slightly convex, with 3 rather large, spiral cords, of which that bordering the umbilicus is the broadest. They are crossed by concentric ribs, running over the whole base and making the cords crenulated. The funnel-shaped umbilicus is pervious. Its wall shows concentric, riblike striae, and a spiral, beaded cord near the base. Its larger diameter occupies a third of that of the shell. The aperture is subcircular, straighter on the side of the slightly concave columella, which forms a conspicuous angle with the basal margin. The parietal wall has a thin layer of enamel, forming a small projection, covering part of the umbilicus. The interior of the nacreous aperture is smooth, and has a flattened rib near the outer and basal margin.

It differs from the allied species, by the rows of short scales, and from all the preceding species, by the rounded periphery of the body whorl.

== Distribution ==
This species occurs in the Sulu Sea, the Philippines; also off New Caledonia.
