= Megadenus =

Scientific classification
- Kingdom: Animalia
- Phylum: Mollusca
- Class: Gastropoda
- Subclass: Caenogastropoda
- Order: Littorinimorpha
- Family: Eulimidae
- Genus: Megadenus; Rosén, 1910

Type species
- Megadenus holothuricola Rosen, 1910

Genus of gastropods

Megadenus is a genus of sea snails, marine gastropod mollusks in the family Eulimidae.

== Species ==
Species within this genus include the following:

- Megadenus cantharelloides (Humphreys & Lützen, 1972)
- Megadenus holothuricola (Rosen, 1910)
- Megadenus oneirophantae (Bouchet & Lützen, 1980)
- Megadenus voeltzkovi (Schepman & Nierstrasz, 1914)

== Megadenus atrae ==
This parasite was discovered to reside in the cloacal chamber of the black sea cucumber Holothuria atra. M. atrae differs from the other species by having moderately long and thick developed collar of the proboscis that contains a constricted apical pseudopallium. Its pseudopallium can be distinguished by its cauldron-like structure. In addition to a rounded basal lip of the shell aperture. M. atrae is found in black sea cucumbers of which are in India, Japan, Australia and New Caledonia.

M.atrae exhibit sexual dimorphism. Female species of M. atrae are slightly bigger than male species as they have a slightly larger shell. Males are able to switch sexes in the absence of a female. The parasite is suggested to have less tolerance to low water temperatures than its host species. Furthermore, this limits its ability to mate and confines it to specific water temperatures of which its host must be in alongside the opposite sex.

Species brought into synonymy

- Megadenus arrhynchus (Ivanov, 1937): synonym of Paramegadenus arrhynchus (Ivanov, 1937)
- Megadenus cysticola (Koehler & Vaney, 1925): synonym of Sabinella cysticola (Koehler & Vaney, 1925)
