= Neopleurotomoides aembe =

Scientific classification
- Kingdom: Animalia
- Phylum: Mollusca
- Class: Gastropoda
- Subclass: Caenogastropoda
- Order: Neogastropoda
- Superfamily: Conoidea
- Family: Raphitomidae
- Genus: Neopleurotomoides
- Species: N. aembe

Binomial name
- Neopleurotomoides aembe Figueira & Absalão, 2012

Species of gastropod

Neopleurotomoides aembe is a species of sea snail, a marine gastropod mollusk in the family Raphitomidae.

== Distribution ==
This marine species occurs in the Campos Basin, southeast Brazil, at a depth of more than 1900 m.
