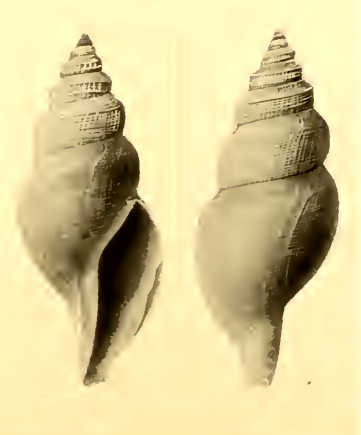
- Original image of a shell of Isodaphne perfragilis

Scientific classification
- Kingdom: Animalia
- Phylum: Mollusca
- Class: Gastropoda
- Subclass: Caenogastropoda
- Order: Neogastropoda
- Superfamily: Conoidea
- Family: Raphitomidae
- Genus: Isodaphne; Laseron, 1954

Type species
- Isodaphne garrardi Laseron, 1954

Species
- See text

= Isodaphne =

Genus of gastropods

Isodaphne is a genus of sea snails, marine gastropod mollusks in the family Raphitomidae.

== Species ==
Species within the genus Isodaphne include:

- Isodaphne albolineata Kilburn, 1977
- Isodaphne garrardi Laseron, 1954
- Isodaphne perfragilis (Schepman, 1913)
