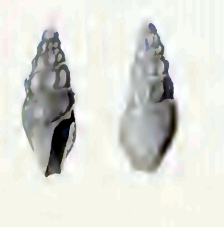
- Original image of a shell of Splendrillia suluensis

Scientific classification
- Kingdom: Animalia
- Phylum: Mollusca
- Class: Gastropoda
- Subclass: Caenogastropoda
- Order: Neogastropoda
- Superfamily: Conoidea
- Family: Drilliidae
- Genus: Splendrillia
- Species: S. suluensis

Binomial name
- Splendrillia suluensis (Schepman, 1913)

Synonyms
- Drillia suluensis Schepman, 1913

= Splendrillia suluensis =

Species of gastropod

Splendrillia suluensis is a species of sea snail, a marine gastropod mollusk in the family Drilliidae.

== Description ==
The length of the shell attains 10 mm, its diameter 3 mm.

(Original description) smooth, shining, white shell is shortly fusiform. It contains 6 to 7 whorls, of which about 2 form a smooth, convexly-whorled protoconch. The subsequent whorls are slightly convex, with a narrow depression below the simple suture. The lower part shows rather strong, rounded ribs from suture to suture, about 10 on penultimate whorl, fainter in the excavation, which latter as well as the ribs disappear on body whorl, with the exception of a strong rib behind the peristome. This latter whorl is moreover slightly compressed, with a trace of a second rib or indistinct varix on the left side of the whorl, which is contracted below, with a few indistinct spiral lirac near the base. The whole shell is covered with very fine growth-striae. The aperture is short, oval, with a broad, rather deep, rounded sinus at the suture, narrower by a strong columellar tubercle. The peristome is thin, though strongly ribbed exteriorly. The columellar marginis concave, strongly enamelled. The base of the aperture ends in a short, wide siphonal canal.

== Distribution ==
This species occurs in the Sulu Sea, near the Philippines.
