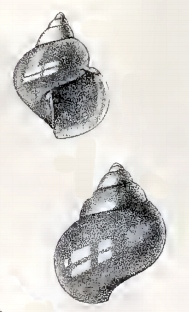
- Guttula sibogae

Scientific classification
- Kingdom: Animalia
- Phylum: Mollusca
- Class: Gastropoda
- Subclass: Vetigastropoda
- Family: Seguenziidae
- Subfamily: Guttulinae
- Genus: Guttula; Schepman, 1908

Type species
- Guttula sibogae Schepman, 1908

= Guttula =

Genus of gastropods

Guttula is a genus of sea snails, marine gastropod molluscs in the family Seguenziidae.

== Description ==
(Original description by Schepman) The small, shell has a conoidal shape. It is smooth, pearly, and perforate. The aperture is rounded, with an angle at the base. The operculum contains few whorls.

It is chiefly on account of the peculiar radula, that Schepman had located the then only species in a new genus.

Quin (1998) adds the following specifications.

Shell: The shell has no peripheral carina, no axial riblets, no midwhorl angulation, no spiral lirae, no basal, posterior or anterolateral sinus, no columellar sinus. The aperture has a circular shape. The columellar tooth is absent. There is no umbilical septum. The shell has punctate microsculpture.

Radula: the rachidian tooth is broader than high and has the lateral wings prominent. The lateral tooth cusp is broad to absent.

== Species ==
Species within the genus Guttula include:

- Guttula blanda Barnard, 1963
- Guttula galatheae Knudsen, 1964
- Guttula sibogae Schepman, 1908
