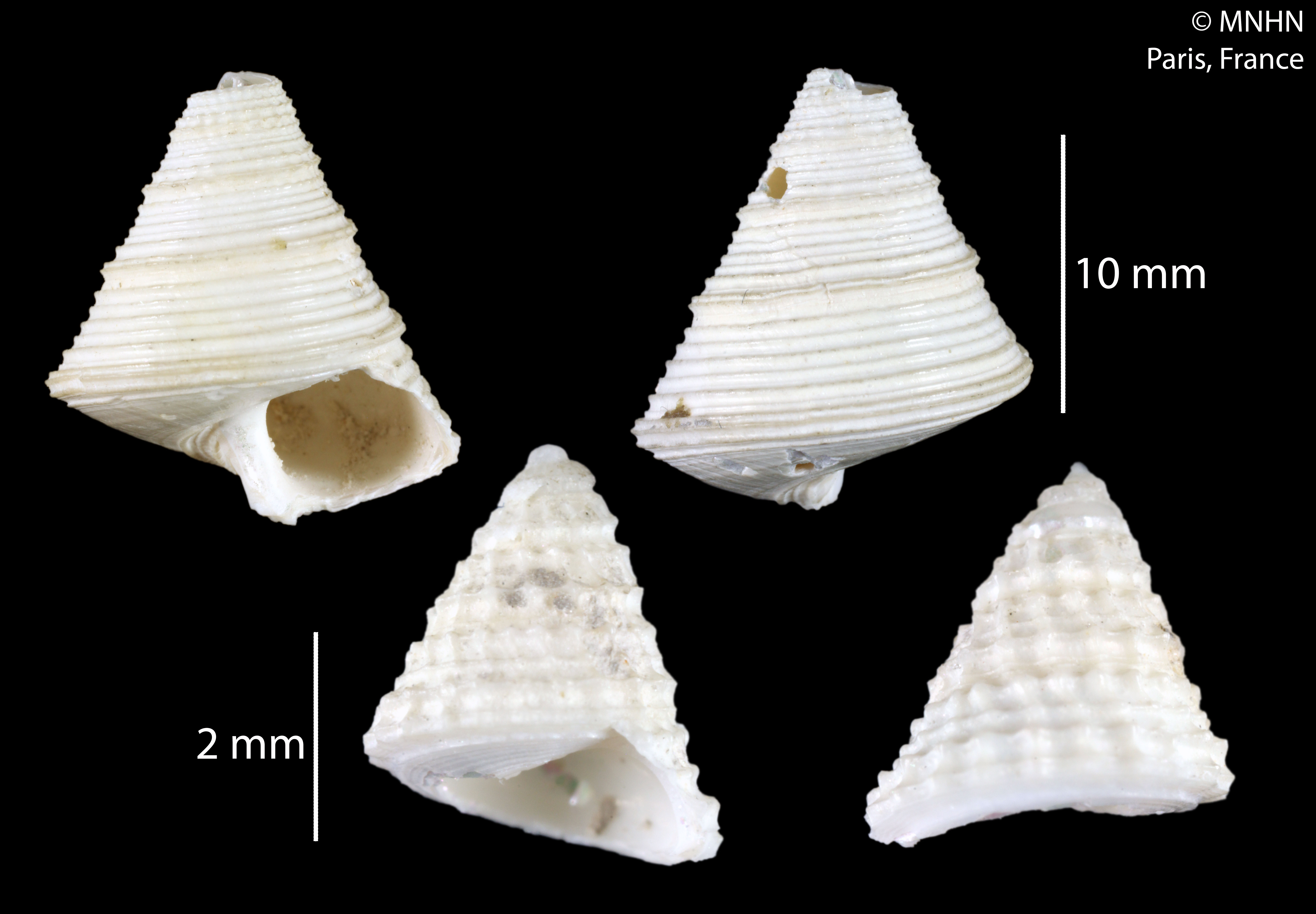
- Shells of Bathyfautor rapuhia

Conservation status
- Naturally Uncommon (NZ TCS)

Scientific classification
- Kingdom: Animalia
- Phylum: Mollusca
- Class: Gastropoda
- Subclass: Vetigastropoda
- Order: Trochida
- Family: Calliostomatidae
- Genus: Bathyfautor
- Species: B. rapuhia

Binomial name
- Bathyfautor rapuhia Marshall, 1995

Synonyms
- Calliostoma rapuhia Marshall, 1995

= Bathyfautor rapuhia =

Species of gastropod

Bathyfautor rapuhia is a species of sea snail, a marine gastropod mollusc in the family Calliostomatidae.

== Distribution ==
This marine species occurs north of New Zealand
