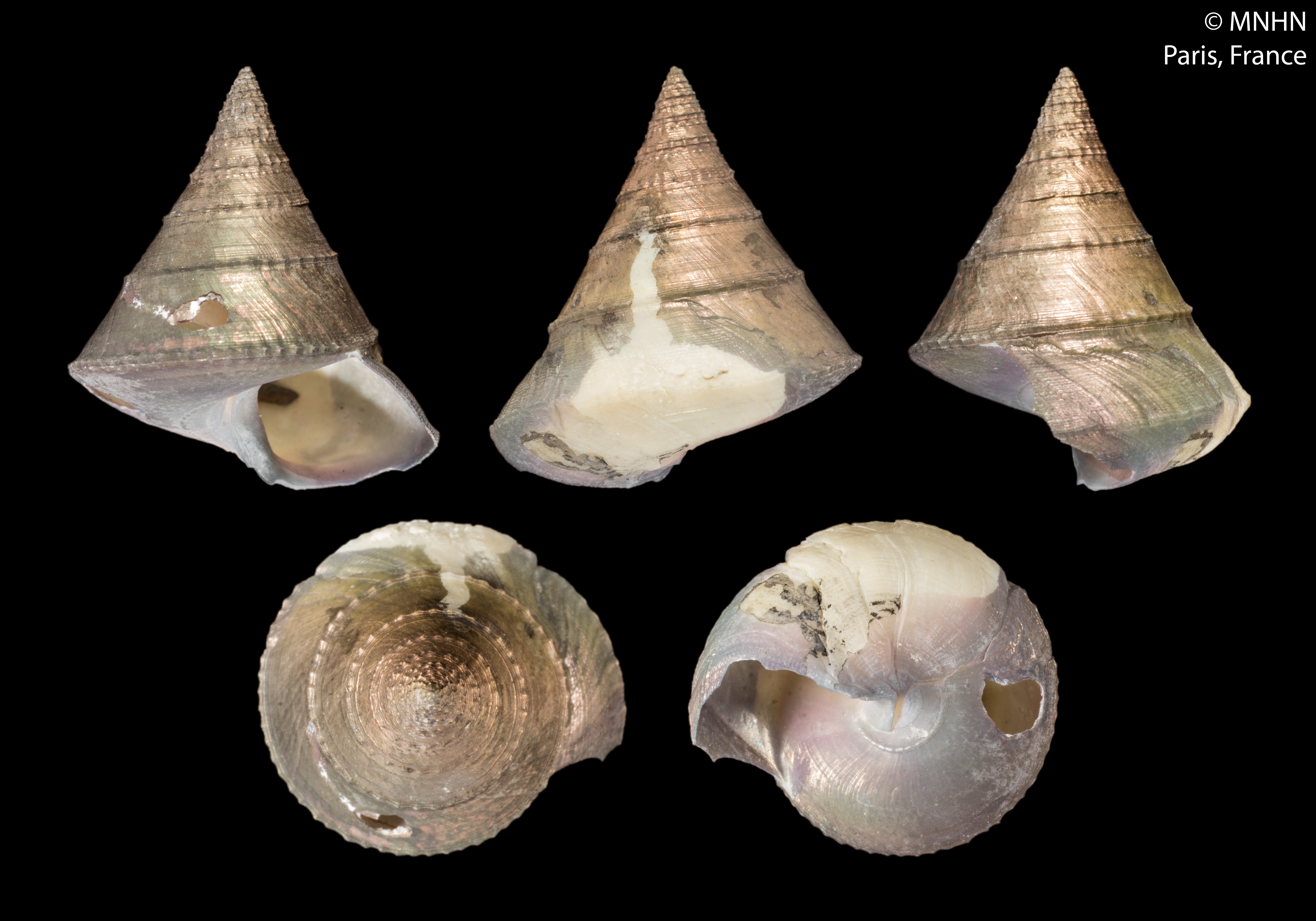
- Shell of Bathyfautor coriolis (holotype at MNHN, Paris)

Scientific classification
- Kingdom: Animalia
- Phylum: Mollusca
- Class: Gastropoda
- Subclass: Vetigastropoda
- Order: Trochida
- Family: Calliostomatidae
- Genus: Bathyfautor
- Species: B. coriolis

Binomial name
- Bathyfautor coriolis Marshall, 1995

= Bathyfautor coriolis =

Species of gastropod

Bathyfautor coriolis is a species of sea snail, a marine gastropod mollusc in the family Calliostomatidae.

== Distribution ==
This species was found in the Coral Sea off the Chesterfield plateau.
