= Megadenus voeltzkovi =

Scientific classification
- Kingdom: Animalia
- Phylum: Mollusca
- Class: Gastropoda
- Subclass: Caenogastropoda
- Order: Littorinimorpha
- Family: Eulimidae
- Genus: Megadenus
- Species: M. voeltzkovi

Binomial name
- Megadenus voeltzkovi Schepman & Nierstrasz, 1914

Species of gastropod

Megadenus voeltzkovi is a species of sea snail, a marine gastropod mollusk in the family Eulimidae.
