= Pagodidaphne =

Scientific classification
- Kingdom: Animalia
- Phylum: Mollusca
- Class: Gastropoda
- Subclass: Caenogastropoda
- Order: Neogastropoda
- Superfamily: Conoidea
- Family: Raphitomidae
- Genus: Pagodidaphne; Shuto, 1983

Type species
- Pagodidaphne colmani Shuto, 1983

Species
- See text

Genus of gastropods

Pagodidaphne is a small genus of sea snails, marine gastropod mollusks in the family Raphitomidae.

== Species ==
Species within the genus Pagodidaphne include:

- Pagodidaphne colmani Shuto, 1983
- Pagodidaphne schepmani (Thiele, 1925)
