= Calliotropis concavospira =

Scientific classification
- Kingdom: Animalia
- Phylum: Mollusca
- Class: Gastropoda
- Subclass: Vetigastropoda
- Family: Calliotropidae
- Genus: Calliotropis
- Species: C. concavospira

Binomial name
- Calliotropis concavospira (Schepman, 1908)

Synonyms
- Solariellopsis concavospira Schepman, 1908

Species of gastropod

Calliotropis concavospira is a species of sea snail, a marine gastropod mollusk in the family Eucyclidae.

== Description ==
The shell can grow to be 9 mm.

== Distribution ==
This marine species occurs off Papua New Guinea, Timor, and Indonesia.
