= Hugo Frederik Nierstrasz =

Dutch zoologist (1872–1937)

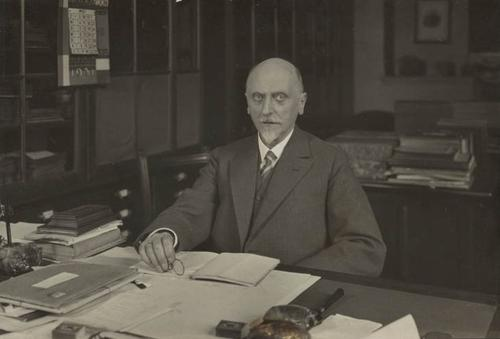
- Born: 30 June 1872; Rotterdam, Netherlands
- Died: 6 September 1937 (aged 65); Walenstadt, Switzerland
- Education: Utrecht University
- Scientific career
- Fields: Biology; Zoology
- Workplaces: Utrecht University
- Thesis: The solenogastres of the Siboga-expedition (1902)
- Doctoral advisor: Ambrosius Hubrecht

Hugo Frederik Nierstrasz (30 June 1872 in Rotterdam – 6 September 1937) was a Dutch zoologist, known for his research in the fields of malacology and carcinology.

From 1892 he studied medicine at Utrecht University, but his interests switched to biology by way of influence from Ambrosius Hubrecht. In 1898 he conducted research of marine animals at the Stazione Zoologica in Naples, and in 1899/1900 took part in the Siboga Expedition to the Dutch East Indies. After his return to Europe, he taught biology classes in Amersfoort, and in 1904 began work as a lecturer in zoology at Utrecht University. In 1910 he succeeded Hubrecht as a professor of zoology, comparative anatomy and zoogeography at the university. In 1930 he became a member of the Royal Netherlands Academy of Arts and Sciences.

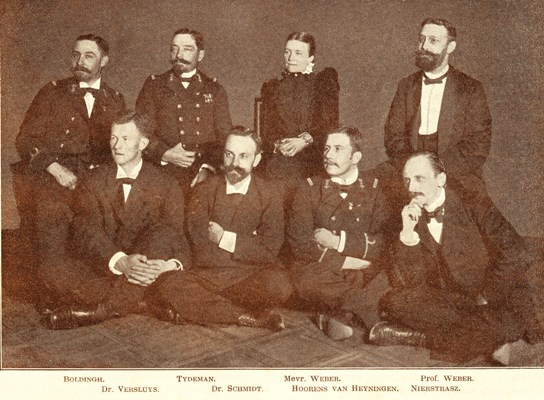
Members of the Siboga Expedition; Nierstrasz, seated figure at lower right.

== Taxon named in his honor ==
Numerous taxa with the specific epithet of nierstraszi bear his name, an example being

- The blue ring Octopus Hapalochlaena nierstraszi.
- The rough whiting, Sillago nierstraszi Hardenberg, 1941, is named after him.

== Published works ==
In 1902 his "The Solenogastres of the Siboga-expedition" was published in English. His other zoological writings include:

- Die Nematomorpha der Siboga-expedition, 1905 – Nematomorpha of the Siboga Expedition.
- Parasitische prosobranchier der Siboga-expedition, 1909 (with Mattheus Marinus Schepman) – Parasitic Prosobranchia of the Siboga Expedition.
- Is specialisatie in de zoölogische wetenschap heilzaam of gevaarlijk, 1910.
- Die Isopoden der Siboga-Expedition, 1913 – Isopods of the Siboga Expedition.
- Anlietung zu makroskopisch-zoologischen Uebungen, 1922 – Instructions for macroscopic zoological tutorials.
- Epicaridea I., 1929 (with Gerard Abraham Brender à Brandis) – Epicaridea.

He was also an editor of Oosthoek's "Geïllustreerde Encyclopaedie" (illustrated encyclopedia).
