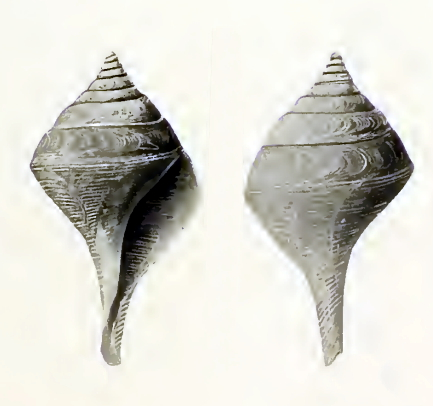
- Shell of Clavosurcula sibogae

Scientific classification
- Kingdom: Animalia
- Phylum: Mollusca
- Class: Gastropoda
- Subclass: Caenogastropoda
- Order: Neogastropoda
- Superfamily: Conoidea
- Family: Cochlespiridae
- Genus: Clavosurcula; Schepman, 1913

Type species
- Clavosurcula sibogae Schepman, 1913

= Clavosurcula =

Genus of gastropods

Clavosurcula is a genus of sea snails, marine gastropod mollusks in the family Cochlespiridae.

== Species ==
Species within the genus Clavosurcula include:

- Clavosurcula schepmani Sysoev, 1997
- Clavosurcula sibogae Schepman, 1913
