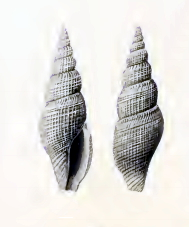
- Original image of a shell of Daphnella celebensis

Scientific classification
- Kingdom: Animalia
- Phylum: Mollusca
- Class: Gastropoda
- Subclass: Caenogastropoda
- Order: Neogastropoda
- Superfamily: Conoidea
- Family: Raphitomidae
- Genus: Daphnella
- Species: D. celebensis

Binomial name
- Daphnella celebensis Schepman, 1913

= Daphnella celebensis =

Species of gastropod

Daphnella celebensis is a species of sea snail, a marine gastropod mollusk in the family Raphitomidae.

== Description ==
The length of the shell attains 16.5 mm, its diameter 5 mm.

(Original description) The strong, ovately-fusiform shell has a very short siphonal canal. It is yellowish-grey, with a few of the lirae reddish-brown. It contains 9 or 10 whorls, (the topmost one broken) of which the upper one is nearly smooth, but with traces of criss-cross lines. The whorls of the teleoconch are convex, slightly angular at some distance from the deep, crenulated suture. The sculpture consists of numerous axial riblets, 32 on penultimate whorl, crossed by numerous spirals, 10 on penultimate whorl, of which the upper one, bordering the suture, is finely crenulated by the upper ends of ribs and finely spirally striated. One of the lirae at the shoulder is the most prominent and makes the whorls angular. The other ones are subequal, with, in many cases, intermediate lirae. On the points of intercrossing the ribs are beaded. Moreover the whole shell is covered with growth-lines. The aperture is oblong, with a shallow sinus above, and a very short, wide siphonal canal below. The peristome is strong, crenulated, arched, below with a small sinus at the limit of the siphonal canal, interiorly with short grooves. The columellar margin is slightly concave above, with a thin layer of enamel.

== Distribution ==
This marine species occurs in the Makassar Strait, Indonesia, and off the Philippines.
