= Fusinus thielei =

Scientific classification
- Kingdom: Animalia
- Phylum: Mollusca
- Class: Gastropoda
- Subclass: Caenogastropoda
- Order: Neogastropoda
- Family: Fasciolariidae
- Genus: Fusinus
- Species: F. thielei

Binomial name
- Fusinus thielei (Schepman, 1911)

Synonyms
- Fusus thielei Schepman, 1911 ·

Species of gastropod

Fusinus thielei is a species of sea snail, a marine gastropod mollusc in the family Fasciolariidae, the spindle snails, the tulip snails and their allies.
