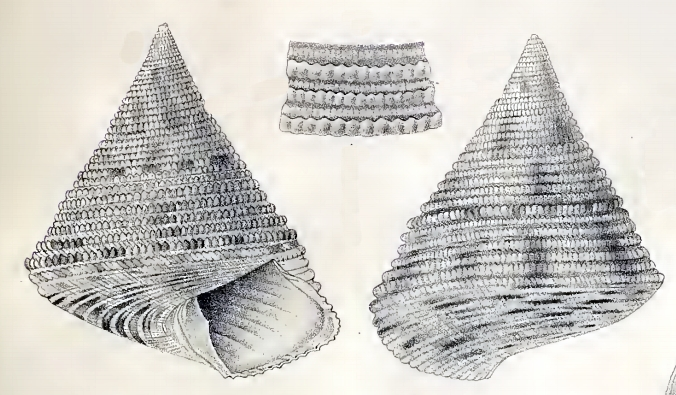
- Original drawing of a shell of Calliostoma rufomaculatum

Scientific classification
- Kingdom: Animalia
- Phylum: Mollusca
- Class: Gastropoda
- Subclass: Vetigastropoda
- Order: Trochida
- Family: Calliostomatidae
- Genus: Calliostoma
- Species: C. rufomaculatum

Binomial name
- Calliostoma rufomaculatum Schepman, 1908

= Calliostoma rufomaculatum =

Species of gastropod

Calliostoma rufomaculatum is a species of sea snail, a marine gastropod mollusk in the family Calliostomatidae.

== Description ==
(Original description by M.M. Schepman) The height of the shell attains 14½ mm. The imperforate shell has an elevated-conical shape. It is flesh-coloured, with rufous spots on the upper surface, and oblong streaks of the same colour above the suture. The upper whorls are violet. The sides of the spire are concave towards the top, and convex towards the periphery. The shell contains 9 whorls. The white nucleus is nearly smooth, but under a lens, with rows of small pits. The subsequent 4 violet whorls contain 3 spirals, crossed by numerous ribs, beaded where they cross each other, leaving square interspaces. The lower whorls contain conspicuously beaded spirals, of which there are 6 larger on each whorl, and in the interstices a much smaller thread, more or less beaded. The body whorl is angular at the periphery. The base of the shell is convex, with 14 spiral lirae and a few intermediate ones, some of these are intermediate lirae.

== Distribution ==
This marine species occurs off Sulawesi, Indonesia.
