= Megadenus cantharelloides =

Scientific classification
- Kingdom: Animalia
- Phylum: Mollusca
- Class: Gastropoda
- Subclass: Caenogastropoda
- Order: Littorinimorpha
- Family: Eulimidae
- Genus: Megadenus
- Species: M. cantharelloides

Binomial name
- Megadenus cantharelloides Humphreys & Lützen, 1972

Species of gastropod

Megadenus cantharelloides is a species of sea snail, a marine gastropod mollusk in the family Eulimidae. The species is mainly distributed throughout Aldabra.
