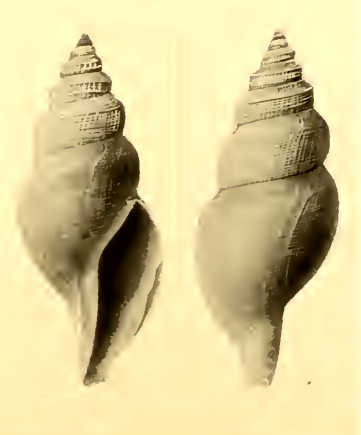
- Original image of a shell of Isodaphne perfragilis

Scientific classification
- Kingdom: Animalia
- Phylum: Mollusca
- Class: Gastropoda
- Subclass: Caenogastropoda
- Order: Neogastropoda
- Superfamily: Conoidea
- Family: Raphitomidae
- Genus: Isodaphne
- Species: I. perfragilis

Binomial name
- Isodaphne perfragilis (Schepman, 1913)

Synonyms
- Daphnella perfragilis Schepman, 1913

= Isodaphne perfragilis =

Species of gastropod

Isodaphne perfragilis is a species of sea snail, a marine gastropod mollusk in the family Raphitomidae.

== Description ==
The length of the shell attains 18.5 mm, its diameter 7.5 mm.

(Original description) The white, fusiform shell has a moderately long siphonal canal. It is very thin, fragile and hyaline. It contains eight whorls, of which about 2½ form the protoconch, with convex whorls and criss-cross sculpture. The subsequent whorls are convex, separated by a deep, linear suture, the upper ones are strongly angular at the shoulder, the angle however is fainter on lower whorls and nearly disappears on the body whorl. A second prominent liration is visible on upper whorls, but becomes likewise fainter. Moreover, the shell is crossed by numerous, fine, raised, spiral striae and finer axial ones, producing a fine cancellation. On the siphonal canal the spirals are stronger. The aperture is oval, angular above, with a rather short, moderately wide siphonal canal below. The peristome is broken, according to growth lines with a shallow sinus above, roundedly angular at the entrance of the siphonal canal. The columellar margin is convex at the body whorl, then nearly straight, slightly curved to the left, with a thin layer of enamel.

== Distribution ==
This marine species occurs in the Makassar Strait and in the Ceram Sea, Indonesia at depths between 835 m - 2029 m
