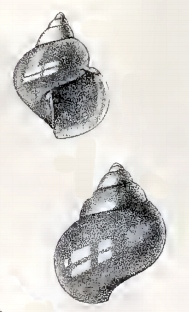
- Original drawing with two views of the shell of Guttula sibogae

Scientific classification
- Kingdom: Animalia
- Phylum: Mollusca
- Class: Gastropoda
- Subclass: Vetigastropoda
- Family: Seguenziidae
- Genus: Guttula
- Species: G. sibogae

Binomial name
- Guttula sibogae Schepman, 1908

= Guttula sibogae =

Species of gastropod

Guttula sibogae is a species of extremely small deep water sea snail, a marine gastropod mollusc in the family Seguenziidae.

== Description ==
(Original description by Schepman) The height of the shell attains 5.5 mm. The shell has a conoidal shape with elevated spire. The periphery and the base are rounded, perforate and pearly. The outer layer, if present, is very thin and pellucid. The five whorls are very convex and smooth. Only under a strong lens very faint growth striae and microscopic punctuations may be observed. The sutures are well-marked and marginated. The body whorl is rounded, with a convex base and a small perforation, nearly concealed by the columella. The aperture is rounded, slightly angular above and stronger so below. The outer margin is thin and regularly curved The columellar margin is concave, reflected over the small umbilicus, angular near the base, where it joins the basal margin, and slightly protracted there. The thin operculum is horny, with few whorls, and concave at the outer side.

The radula has scarcely the length of 1 mm, and is about ⅓ mm in breadth. It has about 20 transverse rows of teeth; the rhachidian tooth is broad, depressed quadrangular with rounded upper angles and pointed basal ones. It has a large reflected cusp with one strong median denticle and two smaller ones on each side. The laterals, one on each side, have a depressed rhombic base, with a reflected margin, ending in a sharp cusp at the proximal side. The other teeth have the characters of being uncini. They are long, slender and hooked, with apparently smooth cusps. The outer ones are shorter, broader, with a few denticles on each side near the top, visible if expanded. The number of uncini is not large, but Schepman could not ascertain the exact number.

== Distribution ==
This marine species occurs off Irian Jaya.
