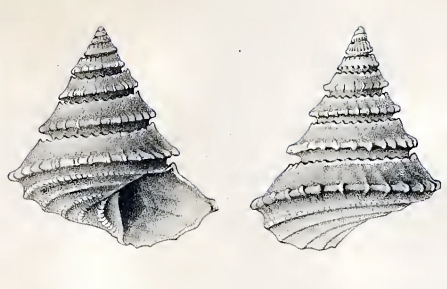
- Drawing with two views of a shell of Calliotropis pagodiformis

Scientific classification
- Kingdom: Animalia
- Phylum: Mollusca
- Class: Gastropoda
- Subclass: Vetigastropoda
- Family: Calliotropidae
- Genus: Calliotropis
- Species: C. pagodiformis

Binomial name
- Calliotropis pagodiformis (Schepman, 1908)

Synonyms
- Solariellopsis pagodiformis Schepman, 1908 (original combination)

= Calliotropis pagodiformis =

Species of gastropod

Calliotropis pagodiformis is a species of sea snail, a marine gastropod mollusk in the family Eucyclidae.

== Description ==
(Original description by Schepman) The shell grows to a height of 14½ mm. The shell has a conical shape, with convex base. It is nacreous, covered by a very thin, transparent layer of yellowish shelly matter. The largest specimen has 8 whorls. The nucleus is white, smooth, occupying about one whorl. The next 3 whorls are straight on their upper part. They are separated from the lower part of each whorl by a sharp keel, and crossed by rather distant radiating ribs, which form sharp tubercles in crossing the keel, and on the third whorl also near the suture. These ribs become obsolete, and disappear on the last whorls, which are smooth on their upper surface. This surface is only very slightly convex, with a spiral row of spinous nodules, at a little distance from the canaliculate suture, and a strong keel at the periphery Below this keel the whorls are excavated, so as to form with the channel of the next whorl, a rather wide, deep channel, over which the keel projects, producing the pagodiform shape. Of the spinous nodules, the largest specimen has 25 at the keel, and about 30 near the suture. The base is rather convex, with a small umbilicus, bordered by a rather strong, crenulated, spiral rib Between this and the peripheral keel run 4 spiral lirae, which are more or less beaded. The outer one nearest to the keel, borders the concave inferior space of the upper whorls, and on this spiral runs the suture, which is slightly crenulate. The aperture is subquadrangular, with the outer and basal margins sharp, irregular by the ends of the spirals The columella is nearly straight, with a distinct angle where it joins the basal margin. This angle is caused by the umbilical rib, its upper part is slightly reflected over the umbilicus and covers it partly. The umbilicus is somewhat roughened by the lines of growth. The whole shell is covered with irregular, interrupted, hairlike lines of growth, visible only under a lens. The interior of the aperture is smooth.

== Distribution ==
This marine species occurs off Papua New Guinea and off Tanimbar Island, Indonesia.
