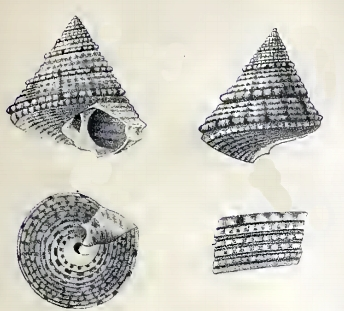
- Original drawing with four views of a shell of Calliostoma crassicostatum

Scientific classification
- Kingdom: Animalia
- Phylum: Mollusca
- Class: Gastropoda
- Subclass: Vetigastropoda
- Order: Trochida
- Family: Calliostomatidae
- Genus: Calliostoma
- Species: C. crassicostatum

Binomial name
- Calliostoma crassicostatum Schepman, 1908

Synonyms
- Calliostoma (Astele) crassicostatum Schepman, 1908; Calliostoma (Spicator) crassicostata Schepman, 1908; Laetifautor crassicostatus (Schepman, 1908)

= Calliostoma crassicostatum =

Species of gastropod

Calliostoma crassicostatum is a species of sea snail in the family Calliostomatidae.

== Description ==
Original description by M.M. Schepman:

The height of the shell attains 9 mm. The shell has an elevated-conical shape with nearly straight sides. It is slightly attenuated towards the spire. Its color is yellowish with purple-brown flames and rufous spots on the lirae. The spire contains 7½ whorls. The nucleus is probably smooth, but slightly worn. it is followed by three whorls, each with 3 strong, spiral lirae, of which the basal one is the strongest. They are beaded where they are crossed by concentric ribs, which disappear on the subsequent whorls. These have 3 strong spirals, of which the basal one forms a conspicuous keel, a little above the linear suture, which on the lower whorls is accompanied by a thin thread and a shallow channel between this and the keel. An intermediate spiral, between the first and the second one, becomes on the body whorl nearly a fourth spiral. On the fourth whorl the lirae are still beaded, on the fifth this is only the case with the upper one. The interstices of the last 4 whorls are nearly smooth, with very fine growth-striae and only a few deeper ones, especially on the upper whorls. The base of the shell is rather convex, with 8 lirae, the external one bordering the subperipheral channel, the external 5 lirae are narrow, with broad, smooth interstices, the central 3 are broad, all are ornamented with rufous spots. The base is covered with very fine growth-striae and more remote deeper striae, rendering the central 2 lirae crenulated. The umbilicus is moderately wide, but seen from the base, nearly closed by a very strong, white, striated funiculus. The aperture is depressedly-rounded, with a thin but not quite intact margin, which is crenulated by the external lirae. The columella is cylindrical, very concave, slightly reflected over the umbilicus, its base only very little angular. The interior of the aperture is nacreous and smooth.

== Distribution ==
This marine species occurs in the waters of Indonesia (Talaud Islands) and off Queensland, Australia.
