= Vita Malacologica =

- Discipline: Malacology
- Language: English
- Edited by: G.C. Kronenberg and J.J. ter Poorten

Publication details
- Former name(s): Vita Marina
- History: 2002 to present
- Publisher: Netherlands Malacological Society -- Nederlandse Malacologische Vereniging (The Netherlands)
- Frequency: Annual

Standard abbreviations
- ISO 4: Vita Malacol.

Indexing
- ISSN: 1572-6371

Links
- Journal homepage

Vita Malacologica is a peer-reviewed scientific journal on the subject of malacology, the study of the Mollusca. It is a print journal published in English by the Netherlands Malacological Society. The journal consists of one themed issue per year.

== Name ==
The name "Vita Malacologica" is Latin, meaning "malacological life".
