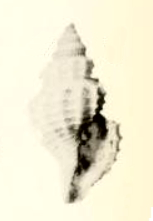
- Original image of a shell of Neopleurotomoides callembryon

Scientific classification
- Kingdom: Animalia
- Phylum: Mollusca
- Class: Gastropoda
- Subclass: Caenogastropoda
- Order: Neogastropoda
- Superfamily: Conoidea
- Family: Raphitomidae
- Genus: Neopleurotomoides
- Species: N. callembryon

Binomial name
- Neopleurotomoides callembryon (Dautzenberg & Fischer, 1896)

Synonyms
- Pleurotoma callembryon Dautzenberg & Fischer, 1896 (original combination)

= Neopleurotomoides callembryon =

Species of gastropod

Neopleurotomoides callembryon is a species of sea snail, a marine gastropod mollusk in the family Raphitomidae.

== Description ==
The length of the shell attains 3.1 mm, its diameter 1.5 mm.

The shell is quite solid. The spire barely exceeds half of the total height. The shell contains 6 whorls, separated by an impressed suture. The protoconch is composed of 4 whorls: the first two are smooth, the next two show vertical, straight and filiform riblets, cut by an acute peripheral keel. The subsequent whorls are impressed at the top by the infra-sutural zone, which is marked with arcuated lines of growth. They then become convex and display strong longitudinal ribs (13 on the body whorl) and narrower yet conspicuous cords (4 on the penultimate whorl and 12 on the body whorl) that pass over the peristome, forming small acute tubercles at their intersections. Toward the end of the body whorl, the ribs are closer together and less prominent. The aperture is wide open, terminated at the base by an open siphonal canal. The columella is slightly twisted and acuminate at the base. The outer lip is arcuate, tightly, but deeply indented at the top. The shell is white, the protoconch is barely tinged with light yellow.

== Distribution ==
This marine species occurs at bathyal depths off the Azores.
