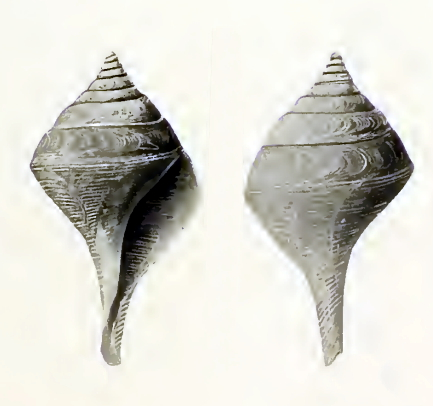
- Original image of a shell of Clavosurcula sibogae

Scientific classification
- Kingdom: Animalia
- Phylum: Mollusca
- Class: Gastropoda
- Subclass: Caenogastropoda
- Order: Neogastropoda
- Superfamily: Conoidea
- Family: Cochlespiridae
- Genus: Clavosurcula
- Species: C. sibogae

Binomial name
- Clavosurcula sibogae Schepman, 1913

= Clavosurcula sibogae =

Species of gastropod

Clavosurcula sibogae is a species of sea snail, a marine gastropod mollusk in the family Cochlespiridae.

== Description ==
The length of the shell attains 38 mm, its diameter 20 mm.

(Original description) The thin, clavate shell has a convex spire, attenuated towards the apex, with along, slender siphonal canal. It is pellucid and white. The shell contains eight whorls, of which about 1½ form a smooth, swollen nucleus. The whorls of the teleoconch are keeled, the keel running in the 2 uppermost whorls a trifle above the linear suture, in the following whorls it is coalescing with the suture. On the body whorl it has the appearance of a blunt, rounded rib, with a slight groove above it. The upper whorls are nearly straight, the last two slightly convex, the body whorl rapidly contracted below the keel. The sculpture consists of numerous raised spiral striae, rather fine in upper part of whorls, very fine on a narrow zone just above the keel, coarser on the keel, much coarser on the basal part of body whorl and on the siphonal canal, which is long and slender. The aperture is rhomboid, with a moderately sharp angle above and an obtuse angle at the keel. The peristome is thin, broken, according to the growth lines with a wide, deep sinus above, then strongly protracted. The columellar margin is nearly straight above, along the body whorl, then concave, the upper part at the siphonal canal straight, then strongly contorted to the left, with a thin layer of enamel, stronger at upper part of the siphonal canal. The interior of the aperture is smooth, but apparently striated by the transparency of the shell.

== Distribution ==
This deep-sea species occurs in the Flores Sea, Indonesia.
