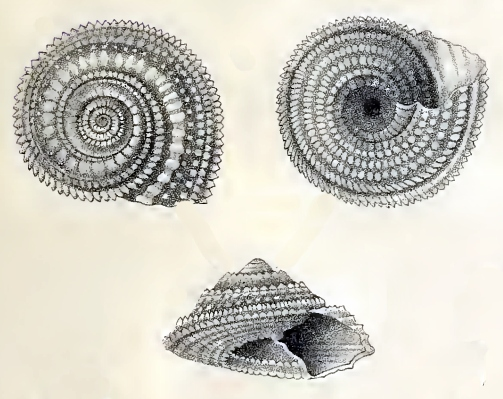
- Original drawing with three views of a shell of Calliotropis pulchra

Scientific classification
- Kingdom: Animalia
- Phylum: Mollusca
- Class: Gastropoda
- Subclass: Vetigastropoda
- Family: Calliotropidae
- Genus: Calliotropis
- Species: C. pulchra

Binomial name
- Calliotropis pulchra (Schepman, 1908)

Synonyms
- Solariellopsis pulchra Schepman, 1908 (original combination)

= Calliotropis pulchra =

Species of gastropod

Calliotropis pulchra is a species of sea snail, a marine gastropod mollusk in the family Eucyclidae.

== Description ==
(Original description by Schepman) The length of the shell is 12 mm. The yellowish-white shell has a depressedly conoidal shape with a nearly flat base. It is sharply keeled with a large umbilicus. The six whorls are slightly convex. The nucleus is smooth. The upper whorls have concentric ribs. On the third whorl they are pointed above, at some distance from the suture, and near the base of this whorl, appears a row of tubercles on a spiral rib. The subsequent whorls are slightly concave or canaliculated near the suture. The fourth whorl is sculptured by concentric ribs, with stronger tubercles at the top. Near that depression; on the fifth whorl, the sculpture consists of a row of tubercles and 3 beaded lirae, of which the third, near the keel is the strongest. This keel is compressedly crenulate. The space between suture and tubercles has short, irregular folds. The same sculpture persists on the body whorl, where the tubercles, about 30 in number, are compressed and show a tendency to become double. The crenules of the keel are slightly concave from above to below. The base of the shell is nearly flat with 5 concentric beaded lirae. The beads bordering the umbilicus are the largest. The whole base is covered with rather regular, riblike striae and very fine microscopic ones, visible also on the upper part of the shell. The large umbilicus occupies from the base of the columella to the opposite side, about 2/5 of the diameter of the shell It is funnel-shaped, and pervious. Its wall is spirally striate, with a single, spiral, beaded rib and radiating plicae. The thin aperture is rhombic, probably not quite developed. Its upper margin is convex, the basal one nearly straight. The columellar marginis slightly convex, reflected above. The parietal wall has a thin layer of enamel.

== Distribution ==
This marine species occurs in the Arafura Sea and off Tanimbar Island, Indonesia
