= Isodaphne albolineata =

Scientific classification
- Kingdom: Animalia
- Phylum: Mollusca
- Class: Gastropoda
- Subclass: Caenogastropoda
- Order: Neogastropoda
- Superfamily: Conoidea
- Family: Raphitomidae
- Genus: Isodaphne
- Species: I. albolineata

Binomial name
- Isodaphne albolineata Kilburn, 1977

Species of gastropod

Isodaphne albolineata is a species of sea snail, a marine gastropod mollusk in the family Raphitomidae.

== Distribution ==
This marine species occurs off Mozambique.
