= Calliotropis bicarinata =

Scientific classification
- Kingdom: Animalia
- Phylum: Mollusca
- Class: Gastropoda
- Subclass: Vetigastropoda
- Family: Calliotropidae
- Genus: Calliotropis
- Species: C. bicarinata

Binomial name
- Calliotropis bicarinata (Schepman, 1908)

Species of gastropod

Calliotropis bicarinata is a species of sea snail, a marine gastropod mollusk in the family Eucyclidae.

== Description ==
The shell can grow to be 15 mm.

== Distribution ==
This marine species occurs off Indonesia and the Philippines.
