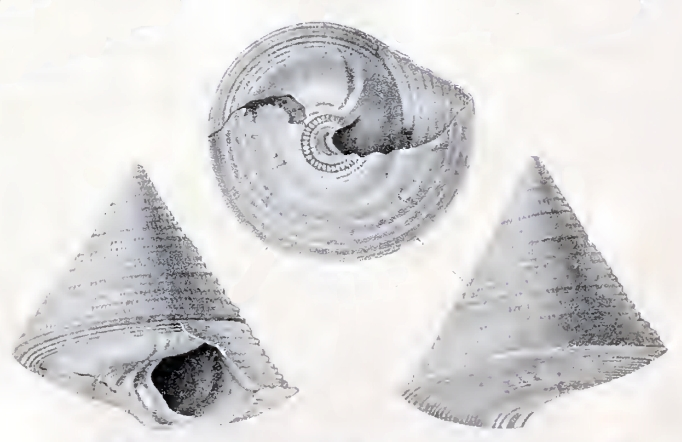
- Original drawing with three views of a shell of Bathyfautor multispinosus

Scientific classification
- Kingdom: Animalia
- Phylum: Mollusca
- Class: Gastropoda
- Subclass: Vetigastropoda
- Order: Trochida
- Superfamily: Trochoidea
- Family: Calliostomatidae
- Genus: Bathyfautor
- Species: B. multispinosus

Binomial name
- Bathyfautor multispinosus (Schepman, 1908)

Synonyms
- Bathyfautor multispinosum sic; Calliostoma multispinosum Schepman, 1908 (original description)

= Bathyfautor multispinosus =

Species of gastropod

Bathyfautor multispinosus is a species of sea snail, a marine gastropod mollusk in the family Calliostomatidae.

== Description ==
(Original description by M.M. Schepman) The height of the shell attains 20 mm. The yellowish, uni-coloured shell has a conical shape with concave sides. It is imperforate. The eight whorls are flat or slightly concave, with spiral lirae, of which 3 on the upper, 10 on the body whorl. The nucleus is obsolete. The next whorls contain spirals and radiating ribs, forming small spines when they cross. On the last three whorls the ribs disappear and only the spirals remain, the uppermost being in the last 5 whorls, conspicuously the largest. These lirae are closely beset with compressed spines, which resemble squamae, with very fine growth striae in the interstices. The periphery has a very sharp weakly crenulated keel. The base of the shell is slightly convex, with fine growth striae and more conspicuous spirals, of which 5 near the periphery and 5 near the centre are considerably stronger. The latter are more or less nodulous. The aperture is subquadrate. The thin, outer margin is nearly straight, with 7 shallow grooves interiorly. The basal margin is convex. The columella is cylindrical, slightly concave, obsoletely angular at the junction with the basal margin.
