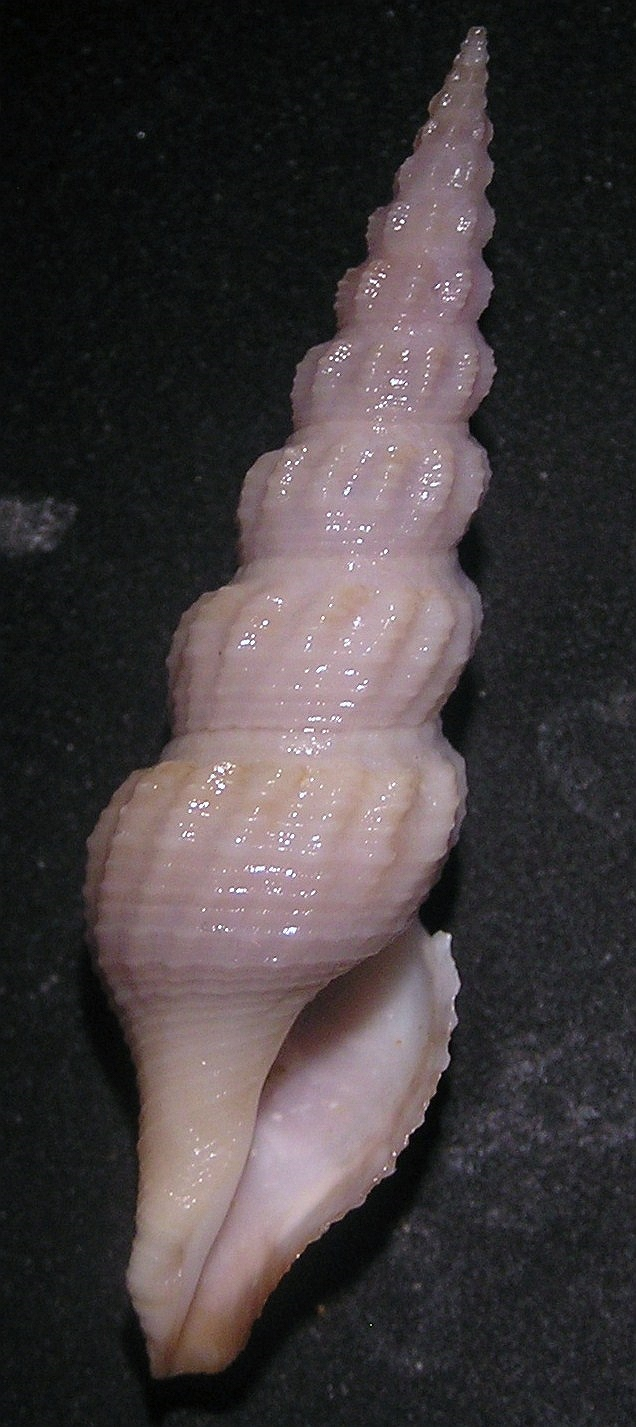
- Shell of Inquisitor aesopus

Scientific classification
- Kingdom: Animalia
- Phylum: Mollusca
- Class: Gastropoda
- Subclass: Caenogastropoda
- Order: Neogastropoda
- Superfamily: Conoidea
- Family: Pseudomelatomidae
- Genus: Inquisitor
- Species: I. aesopus

Binomial name
- Inquisitor aesopus (Schepman, 1913)

Synonyms
- Crassispira aesopus (Schepman, 1913); Drillia aesopus Schepman, 1913

= Inquisitor aesopus =

Species of gastropod

Inquisitor aesopus is a species of sea snail, a marine gastropod mollusk in the family Pseudomelatomidae, the turrids and allies.

== Description ==
The length of the shell varies between 28 mm (1.1 in) and 70 mm (2.8 in).

The fusiform shell has a long, acute spire. It is yellowish-brown, alternating with red-brown. It contains 13 or 14 whorls which at least 2 (uppermost whorl broken) form a smooth protoconch. The subsequent whorls are scarcely convex, probably about half a whorl with only a few smooth ribs must still be reckoned to the protoconch. The remaining whorls contain a rather strong, nodulous, bilirate, infrasutural rib, red-brown in the interstices of nodules. Below this is a rather narrow excavated space, with 5 spiral threads and faint, descending, red-brown llammules, corresponding to the interstices of the subsulural nodules. The lower part of the whorls show slightly oblique, rather numerous ribs, 17 in number on penultimate whorl. The ribbed zone is convex, angular above, crossed by 4, on lower whorls by 5 rather flat, stronger, spiral lirae and between these 2 fainter spirals. The shell has moreover rather strong growth lines, making the interstices between the ribs granular. These interstices are more or less red-brown. On the body whorl, which is contracted below and ends in a rather short, recurved siphonal canal, the ribs become fainter below the periphery. Near and on the siphonal canal the darker colour reappears in a fainter way. The body whorl is humpbacked by a strong, oblique varix, even continued in a fainter manner on the siphonal canal. This body whorl with canal is crossed by about 20 principal lirae. The aperture is oblong, with a rather deep sinus above, narrower at its entrance than behind, where it is regularly rounded. The peristome is rather thin, with a large sinus near the limit of the body whorl and siphonal canal. The columellar margin is tubercled above, then slightly concave, running nearly straight in the narrow, slightly contorted and upturned siphonal canal. It is strongly enamelled, especially below, where it leaves a conspicuous umbilical slit. The interior of the aperture is white.

== Distribution ==
This marine species occurs off KwaZulu-Natal, South Africa, to South Madagascar. The holotype was found off Kwandang, Indonesia.
