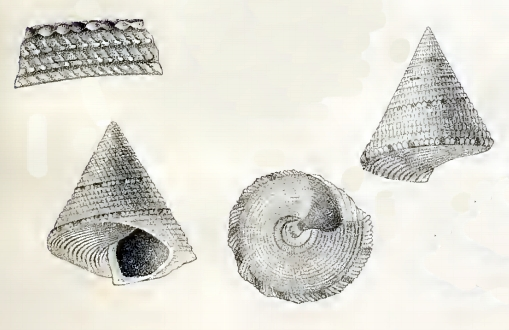
- Original drawing of a shell of Calliostoma quadricolor

Scientific classification
- Kingdom: Animalia
- Phylum: Mollusca
- Class: Gastropoda
- Subclass: Vetigastropoda
- Order: Trochida
- Family: Calliostomatidae
- Genus: Calliostoma
- Species: C. quadricolor

Binomial name
- Calliostoma quadricolor Schepman, 1908

= Calliostoma quadricolor =

Species of gastropod

Calliostoma quadricolor is a species of sea snail, a marine gastropod mollusk in the family Calliostomatidae.

Some authors place this taxon in the subgenus Calliostoma (Fautor).

== Description ==
(Original description by M.M. Schepman) The height of the shell attains 8½ mm. The imperforate shell has an elevated-conical shape, with slightly concave sides. It is yellowish, with a greenish tinge. The peripheral keel is articulated with white and rufous. The spire is purplish at the top. The 7 whorls are flat. The nucleus is nearly smooth, under the lens with a few rows of pits. The other whorls are covered with spirals, 2 on the upper whorls, increasing to 7 on the body whorl. These spirals are crossed by concentric ribs, connecting the spirals and producing beads in crossing them, the lowest, bicoloured spiral of each whorl is the strongest The beads on it become spiny, and form a conspicuous keel on the body whorl, it is double. The base of the shell is flat, with 13 unequal spirals, crossed by numerous radiating ribs, making them beaded. The aperture is rhombic. The upper margin is straight, the basal one slightly convex. The columella is cylindrical, slightly concave, angular at its junction with the basal margin. The outer wall is grooved interiorly by about 5 shallow grooves.

== Distribution ==
This marine species occurs off Papua New Guinea and in the Arafura Sea in the epipelagic zone.
