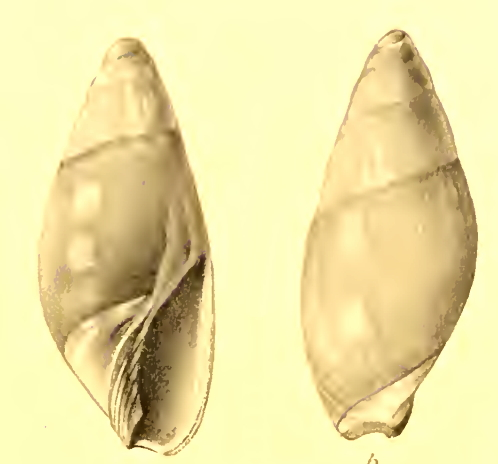
- Shell of Amalda abyssicola (holotype)

Scientific classification
- Kingdom: Animalia
- Phylum: Mollusca
- Class: Gastropoda
- Subclass: Caenogastropoda
- Order: Neogastropoda
- Family: Ancillariidae
- Genus: Amalda
- Species: A. abyssicola

Binomial name
- Amalda abyssicola Schepman, 1911

Synonyms
- Ancilla abyssicola Schepman, 1911 · unaccepted (original combination)

= Amalda abyssicola =

Species of gastropod

Amalda abyssicola is a species of sea snail, a marine gastropod mollusk in the family Ancillariidae.

== Description ==
The length of the shell attains 13.5 mm, its diameter 6 mm.

(Original description) The shell is acuminately oval, whitish, with a yellowish tint on the body whorl, and faint traces of brown lines at the suture and balteus. It is thin and translucent, with a conical spire that is blunt at the porcellaneous apex.

There are approximately four whorls, with the sutures filled by a thick enamel layer. The sides of the spire are nearly straight, and the greatest convexity of the shell lies in the lower portion. The surface is sculpted with fine growth striae, which become coarser near the aperture, along with very fine spiral striations, and one groove above the undivided, white balteus. There is no tooth. The aperture is oval, with a thin outer margin, and the columellar margin is arched, covered by a relatively thick layer of enamel on the body whorl and a few short folds near the base. The sinus is broad and shallow.

== Distribution ==
This marine species occurs in the Banda Sea, Indonesia.
