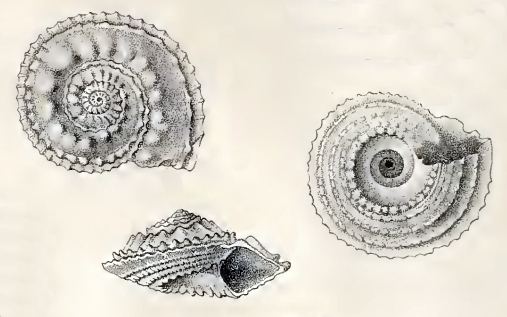
- Original drawing with three views of a shell of Calliotropis spinulosa

Scientific classification
- Kingdom: Animalia
- Phylum: Mollusca
- Class: Gastropoda
- Subclass: Vetigastropoda
- Family: Calliotropidae
- Genus: Calliotropis
- Species: C. spinulosa

Binomial name
- Calliotropis spinulosa (Schepman, 1908)

Synonyms
- Solariellopsis spinulosa Schepman, 1908

= Calliotropis spinulosa =

Species of gastropod

Calliotropis spinulosa is a species of small sea snail, a marine gastropod mollusk in the family Eucyclidae.

== Description ==
(Original description by Schepman) The shell grows to a height of 5 mm. The yellowish-white shell is depressed, with a low conical, convex spire. It is strongly keeled and has a convex base. The umbilicus is large. The shell (not adult) consists of about 5 slightly convex whorls, with a conspicuous suture. The sculpture consists of 2 spiral rows of short, thick tubercles, 15 or 16 in number on the body whorl, resembling small spines. One row borders a depression at the upper part of the whorls, the other near the base The tubercles are connected by traces of spiral lirae. On the upper whorls the tubercles are connected by concentric ribs. The keel, visible on the penultimate whorl, is very conspicuous. It is crenulated by slightly erect tubercles. The base of the shell is convex, with four beaded, spiral lirae, and two intermediate ones near the aperture; that bordering the umbilicus is the strongest. The funnel-shaped umbilicus is pervious. Its largest diameter occupies about 2/5 of that of the shell. Its walls are finely striate, like the whole surface of the shell. The aperture is rhombic, its upper margin convex, the basal one nearly straight. The columellar margin is slightly convex. The interior is smooth.

== Distribution ==
This marine species occurs off Indonesia.
