= Mattheus Marinus Schepman =

Dutch malacologist (1847–1919)

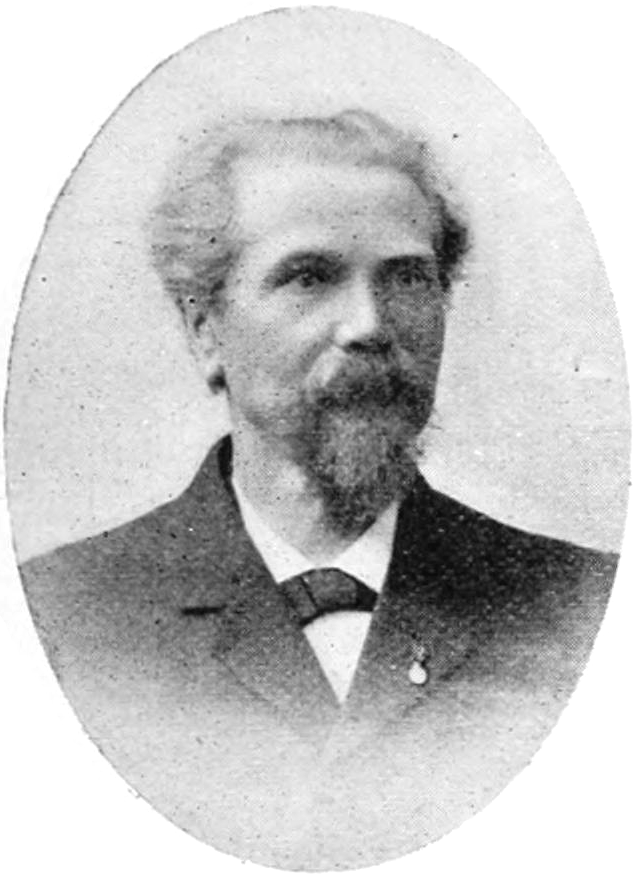
- Mattheus Marinus Schepman
- Born: August 17, 1847; Rhoon, Netherlands
- Died: November 19, 1919 (aged 72); Bosch en Duin, Netherlands
- Known for: collecting and taxonomy
- Scientific career
- Fields: Malacology

Mattheus Marinus Schepman (17 August 1847 – 19 November 1919) was a Dutch malacologist. He was one of the foremost collectors of mollusc shells in the Netherlands, and was also high on the overall list of European collectors.

Dutch collectors developed an interest in natural history specimens that were collected on worldwide expeditions since the 16th century. An interest in conchology led to numerous shell publications. In 1934 the Nederlandse Malacologische Vereniging (Netherlands Malacological Society) was founded. In commemoration of its 75th anniversary, a book honoring in detail the work of Mattheus Schepman was published.

== His research ==
Schepman was both a collector and a methodical scientist, which combination "made his collection of great value to the entire malacological community." He was given the opportunity to study a collection by Max Carl Wilhelm Weber, Director of the Zoölogisch Museum Amsterdam (ZMA). Many of the specimens he studied and collected were gathered by the Siboga Expedition. The expedition went to the Indo-Malaysian Archipelago and investigated 322 sites.

Schepman's most significant work is reported in "The Prosobranchia of the Siboga expedition". HM Siboga was the transport ship for the eponymous "Siboga Expedition". Published over five years and consisting of 494 pages, it covers 212 genera and 1,467 species. Eduard von Martens was involved in mollusk identification from the first expedition, and he "probably recommended Schepman for the work on the second." In any event, Schepman published seven volumes which described 2,500 specimens, and 1,235 shelled mollusc species, "many new to science."

An important aspect of his work was his scientific collection of shells, a collection which was almost unprecedented in scope and breadth. Eventually sold in 1920 to the Zoological Museum Amsterdam for ƒ7,205, the collection consisted of 9,000 species and 1,250 genera of shelled freshwater, marine, and land molluscs.

== Published works ==
Schepman wrote over 62 malacological works. They include: (incomplete)

- Horst R. & Schepman M. M. (1908). Catalogue systématique des mollusques (gastropodes prosobranches et polyplacophores). Tome XIII. Leiden.
- (in German) Schepman M. M. & Nierstrasz H. F. (1913). "Parasitische und kommensalistische Mollusken aus Holothurien". Stuttgart.

The Prosobranchia of the Siboga Expedition

- Schepman M. M. (1908). "The Prosobranchia of the Siboga Expedition. Part I, Rhipidoglossa and Docoglossa, with an appendix by R. Bergh". Uitkomsten op zoologisch, botanisch, oceanografisch en geologisch gebied verzameld in Nederlandsch Oost-Indië 1899–1900 aan boord H. M. Siboga, Monographie, E. J. Brill, Leyden, 49a: 107 pp., 9 plates.
- Schepman M. M. (1908). "The Prosobranchia of the Siboga Expedition. Part II, Taenioglossa and Ptenoglossa". 49b: 108–231, 7 plates.
- Schepman M. M. (1908). "The Prosobranchia of the Siboga Expedition. Part III, Gymnoglossa". 49c: 233–246, 1 plate.
- (in German) Schepman M. M. & Nierstrasz H. F. (1909). "Parasitische prosobranchier der Siboga-expedition". 49(2): 1–28, 2 plates.
- Schepman M. M. (1911). The Prosobranchia of the Siboga Expedition. "Part IV. Rachiglossa". 49d: 247–364, 7 plates.
- Schepman M. M. (1913). "The Prosobranchia of the Siboga Expedition. Part V Toxoglossa." 49e: 365–452, 6 plates.
- Schepman M. M. (1913). "The Prosobranchia of the Siboga Expedition. Part VI, Pulmonata and Opisthobranhia Tectibranchiata, tribe Bullomorpha." 49f: 453–494, 2 plates.

== Taxa ==
Schepman described and named a large number of taxa of molluscs, mostly species, especially species of marine gastropods. For example, in November 2012, the World Register of Marine Species (WoRMS) listed 182 valid marine taxa (181 marine gastropods, 1 marine bivalve) that were described by Schepman.

Schepman originally described about 450 taxa, including many turrids. Examples of the numerous taxa he named and described are in the following list (synonyms are not included):

=== Families ===
Freshwater and marine cave snails:

- Neritiliidae Schepman, 1908

=== Genera ===
Sea snails (sorted chronologically):

- Guttula Schepman, 1908
- Pseudococculina Schepman, 1908
- Clavosurcula Schepman, 1913
- Daphnellopsis Schepman, 1913
- Meloscaphander Schepman, 1913
- Volvulopsis Schepman, 1913

=== Species ===
Land snails:

- Amphidromus reflexilahris Schepman
- Helicarion sumatrensis Schepman, 1886
- Asperitas bimaensis (Schepman, 1892)
- Dyakia densestriata Schepman, 1896
- Hemiplecta butikkoferi Schepman, 1896
- Euplecta costellifera Schepman, 1918
- Euplecta imperforata Schepman, 1918
- Macrochlamys imperforata Schepman, 1918
- Sitala crenocarinata Schepman, 1918
- Planispira planissima Schepman, 1918
- Cyclotus subcanaliculatus Schepman, 1918

Land slugs:

- Parmarion goedhuisi Schepman, 1896
- Microparmarion litteratus Schepman, 1896
- Hemicarion semicalcareus Schepman, 1896

Freshwater snails:

- Melania subplicata Schepman, 1886
- Melania snellemanni Schepman, 1886
- Bellamya liberiana (Schepman, 1888)
- Potadoma buttikoferi (Schepman, 1888)
- Potadoma liberiensis (Schepman, 1888)
- Melania glandiformis Schepman, 1896
- Melania schwaneri Schepman, 1896
- Brotia borneensis (Schepman, 1896)
- Melania mülleri Schepman, 1896
- Melania subpunctata Schepman, 1896
- Neritina (Clithon) subocellata Schepman, 1884 - a synonym of Clithon diadema
- Melania subcostellaris Schepman, 1918
- Melania sentaniensis Schepman, 1918
- Melania kampeni Schepman, 1918

Freshwater bivalves:

- Hyridella misoolensis (Schepman, 1897)
- Schepmania nieuwenhuisi (Schepman, 1898)
- Nausitora hedleyi Schepman, 1919 – brackish water species

Sea snails (sorted chronologically):

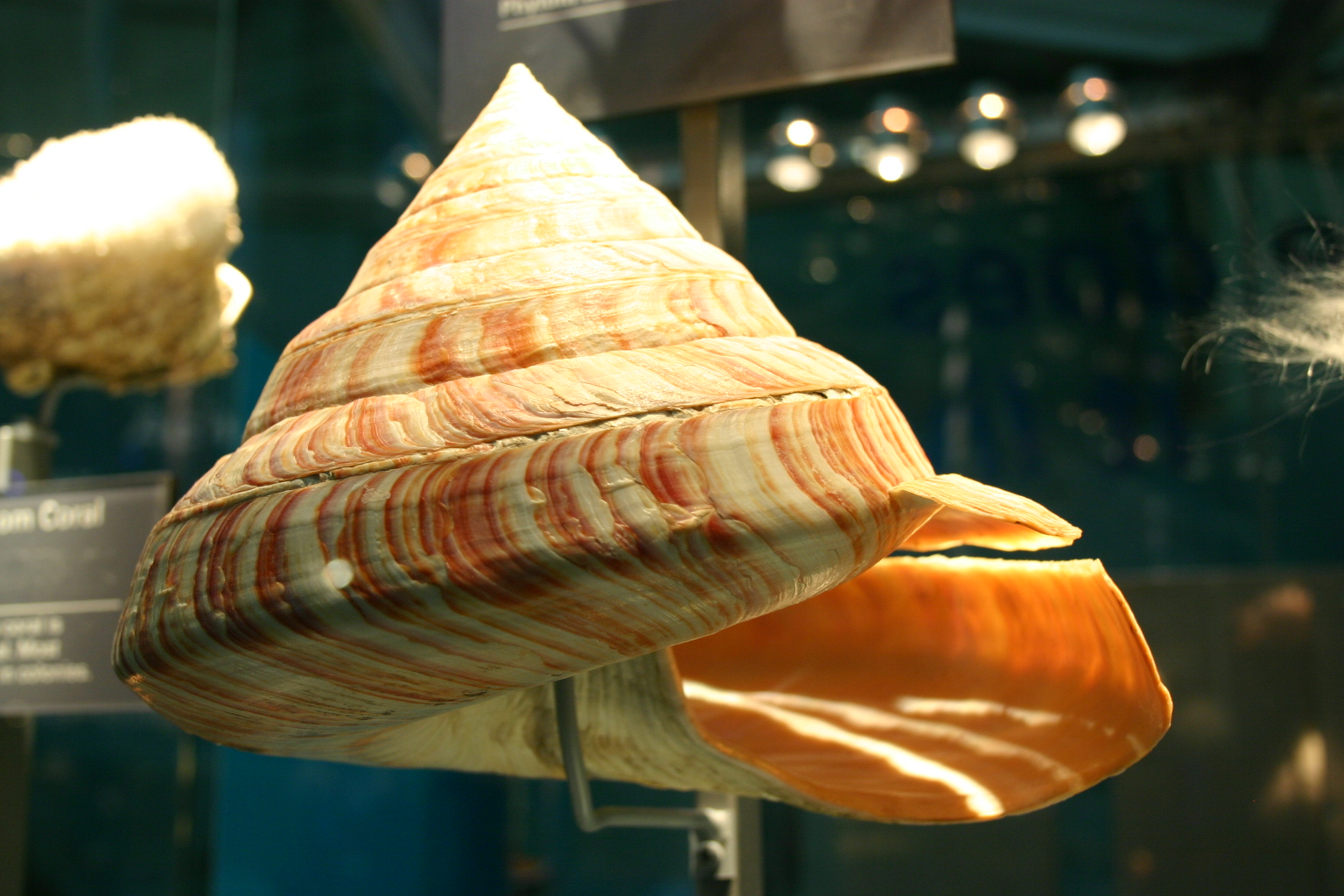
A shell of the deepwater slit snail Entemnotrochus rumphii, described and named by Schepman in 1879

1870s and 1890s

- Entemnotrochus rumphii (Schepman, 1879)
- Nassarius javanus (Schepman, 1891)
- Oliva semmelinki Schepman, 1891
- Ergalatax martensi (Schepman, 1892)

1903

- Astralium provisorium (Schepman, 1903)

1904

- Oliva dubia Schepman, 1904
- Oliva rufofulgurata Schepman, 1904

1907

- Cerithium claviforme Schepman, 1907
- Cerithium koperbergi Schepman, 1907
- Nassarius celebensis (Schepman, 1907)
- Notadusta martini (Schepman, 1907)

1908

- Anatoma exquisita (Schepman, 1908)
- Anatoma maxima (Schepman, 1908)
- Ancistrobasis monodon (Schepman, 1908)
- Bathyfautor multispinosus (Schepman, 1908)
- Bathymophila callomphala (Schepman, 1908)
- Calliostoma crassicostatum Schepman, 1908
- Calliostoma quadricolor Schepman, 1908
- Calliostoma rufomaculatum Schepman, 1908
- Calliostoma simplex Schepman, 1908
- Calliostoma virgo Schepman, 1908
- Calliotropis bicarinata (Schepman, 1908)
- Calliotropis calcarata (Schepman, 1908)
- Calliotropis concavospira (Schepman, 1908)
- Calliotropis limbifera (Schepman, 1908)
- Calliotropis multisquamosa (Schepman, 1908)
- Calliotropis muricata (Schepman, 1908)
- Calliotropis pagodiformis (Schepman, 1908)
- Calliotropis pulchra (Schepman, 1908)
- Calliotropis spinulosa (Schepman, 1908)
- Danilia weberi Schepman, 1908
- Emarginella sibogae (Schepman, 1908)
- Emarginula foveolata Schepman, 1908
- Guttula sibogae Schepman, 1908
- Hadroconus sibogae (Schepman, 1908)
- Herpetopoma ringens (Schepman, 1908)
- Pectinodonta alta Schepman, 1908
- Pectinodonta orientalis Schepman, 1908
- Perrinia cancellata (Schepman, 1908)
- Perrinia nigromaculata (Schepman, 1908)
- Perrinia plicifera (Schepman, 1908)
- Perrinia squamicarinata (Schepman, 1908)
- Phenacolepas radiata Schepman, 1908
- Pseudococculina granulata Schepman, 1908
- Pseudococculina rugosoplicata Schepman, 1908
- Solariella ornatissima (Schepman, 1908)
- Tibatrochus incertus (Schepman, 1908)
- Tugalina plana (Schepman, 1908)

1909

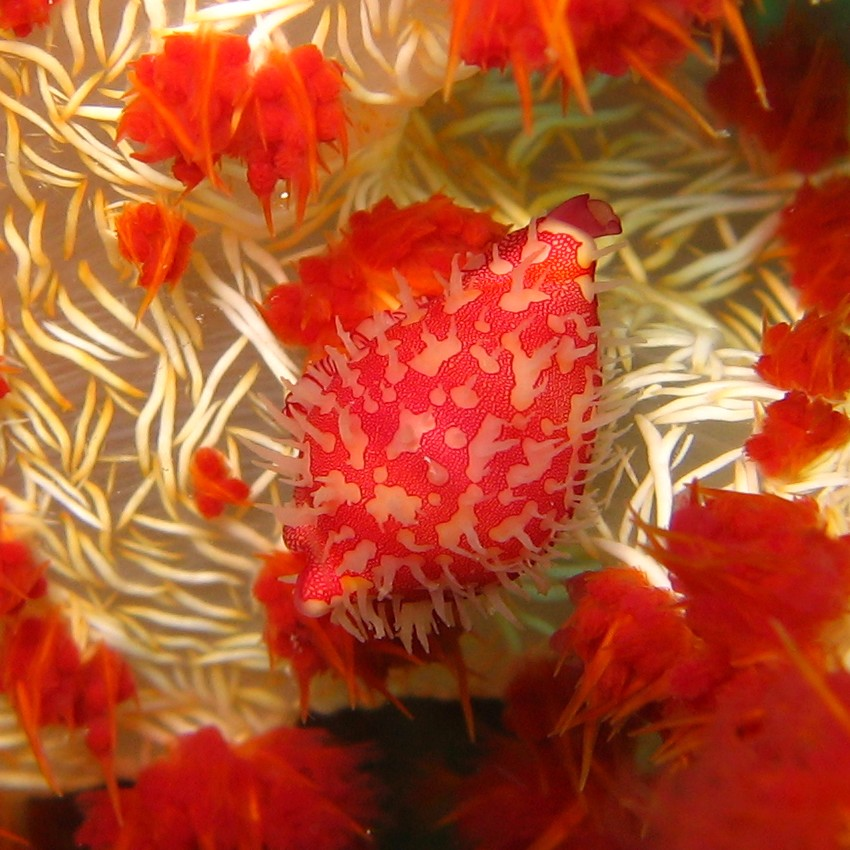
In the center of this image is a well-camouflaged live individual of Primovula roseomaculata, described and named by Schepman in 1909. Head end towards the top of the image; the red mantle is covering the shell entirely.

- Abyssochrysos melvilli (Schepman, 1909)
- Akibumia orientalis (Schepman, 1909)
- Biplex aculeata (Schepman, 1909)
- Carenzia melvillii (Schepman, 1909)
- Cylindriscala humerosa (Schepman, 1909)
- Cylindriscala sibogae (Schepman, 1909)
- Eccliseogyra fragilissima (Schepman, 1909)
- Epitonium abyssicola (Schepman, 1909)
- Epitonium melvilli (Schepman, 1909)
- Fluxinella marginata (Schepman, 1909)
- Fluxinella trochiformis (Schepman, 1909)
- Goodingia varicosa (Schepman, 1909)
- Granosolarium mirabile (Schepman, 1909)
- Gregorioiscala nierstraszi (Schepman, 1909)
- Heliacus costatus (Schepman, 1909)
- Heliacus madurensis (Schepman, 1909)
- Inella verluysi (Schepman, 1909)
- Niso smithi Schepman, 1909
- Pelseneeria sibogae (Schepman & Nierstrasz, 1909)
- Primovula roseomaculata (Schepman, 1909)
- Quinnia sykesi (Schepman, 1909)
- Seguenzia costulifera Schepman, 1909
- Seguenzia dautzenbergi Schepman, 1909
- Seila versluysi (Schepman, 1909)
- Stellaria gigantea (Schepman, 1909)
- Stilapex eburnea (Schepman & Nierstrasz, 1909)
- Stilapex parva (Schepman, 1909)
- Subularia circumstriata Schepman, 1909
- Triphora schmidti Schepman, 1909
- Trivellona abyssicola (Schepman, 1909)
- Trivellona paucicostata (Schepman, 1909)
- Trivellona sibogae (Schepman, 1909)

1911

- Amalda abyssicola Schepman, 1911
- Amalda edgariana Schepman, 1911
- Antillophos minutus (Schepman, 1911)
- Babelomurex ricinuloides (Schepman, 1911)
- Chryseofusus chrysodomoides (Schepman, 1911)
- Cyllene sibogae Schepman, 1911
- Eosipho smithi (Schepman, 1911)
- Chryseofusus chrysodomoides (Schepman, 1911)
- Fusinus thielei (Schepman, 1911)
- Manaria brevicaudata (Schepman, 1911)
- Mitrella circumstriata (Schepman, 1911)
- Mitrella simplex (Schepman, 1911)
- Mitrella undulata (Schepman, 1911)
- Nassarius crebricostatus (Schepman, 1911)
- Nassarius macrocephalus (Schepman, 1911)
- Nassarius multipunctatus (Schepman, 1911)
- Pagodula obtuselirata (Schepman, 1911)
- Pagodula pulchella (Schepman, 1911)
- Pazinotus sibogae (Schepman, 1911)
- Pazinotus smithi (Schepman, 1911)
- Peristernia incerta Schepman, 1911
- Preangeria dentata (Schepman, 1911)
- Turrilatirus melvilli (Schepman, 1911)
- Ziba abyssicola (Schepman, 1911)

1913

- Acamptodaphne biconica (Schepman, 1913)
- Anticlinura biconica (Schepman, 1913)
- Asperdaphne elegantissima (Schepman, 1913)
- Asperdaphne suluensis (Schepman, 1913)
- Belomitra brachytoma (Schepman, 1913)
- Benthomangelia celebensis (Schepman, 1913)
- Benthomangelia trophonoidea (Schepman, 1913)
- Borsonia smithi Schepman, 1913
- Borsonia timorensis (Schepman, 1913)
- Brachytoma rufolineata (Schepman, 1913)
- Buccinaria abbreviata (Schepman, 1913)
- Clavosurcula sibogae Schepman, 1913
- Cochlespira pulchella (Schepman, 1913)
- Comitas melvilli (Schepman, 1913)
- Comitas obtusigemmata (Schepman, 1913)
- Comitas pagodaeformis (Schepman, 1913)
- Crassispira aesopus (Schepman, 1913)
- Crassispira rubidofusca (Schepman, 1913)
- Cryptodaphne affinis (Schepman, 1913)
- Cryptodaphne gradata (Schepman, 1913)
- Cytharopsis butonensis (Schepman, 1913)
- Daphnella celebensis Schepman, 1913
- Daphnellopsis lamellosa Schepman, 1913
- Diniatys dubius (Schepman, 1913)
- Duplicaria tiurensis (Schepman, 1913)
- Emarginula paucipunctata Schepman, 1913
- Euclathurella subuloides (Schepman, 1913)
- Gemmula sibogae (Schepman, 1913)
- Gemmula truncata (Schepman, 1913)
- Glyphostoma granulifera (Schepman, 1913)
- Guraleus halmaherica (Schepman, 1913)
- Guraleus savuensis (Schepman, 1913)
- Gymnobela ceramensis (Schepman, 1913)
- Gymnobela dubia (Schepman, 1913)
- Gymnobela pulchra (Schepman, 1913)
- Gymnobela sibogae (Schepman, 1913)
- Horaiclavus madurensis (Schepman, 1913)
- Horaiclavus multicostata (Schepman, 1913)
- Inquisitor aesopus (Schepman, 1913)
- Inquisitor subangusta (Schepman, 1913)
- Isodaphne perfragilis (Schepman, 1913)
- Ithycythara septemcostata (Schepman, 1913)
- Leucosyrinx pyramidalis (Schepman, 1913)
- Lienardia peristernioides Schepman, 1913
- Lioglyphostomella timorensis (Schepman, 1913)
- Maoridaphne supracancellata (Schepman, 1913)
- Maoritomella batjanensis (Schepman, 1913)
- Marshallena nierstraszi (Schepman, 1913)
- Mioawateria extensaeformis (Schepman, 1913)
- Mucronalia variabilis Schepman in Voeltzkow, 1913
- Myurella exiguoides (Schepman, 1913)
- Neopleurotomoides rufoapicata (Schepman, 1913)
- Otitoma kwandangensis (Schepman, 1913)
- Otitoma timorensis (Schepman, 1913)
- Paracomitas undosa (Schepman, 1913)
- Pleurotomella clathurellaeformis Schepman, 1913
- Pseudodaphnella virgo (Schepman, 1913)
- Pseudoetrema crassicingulata (Schepman, 1913)
- Pseudorhaphitoma multigranosa (Schepman, 1913)
- Sabatia supracancellata (Schepman, 1913)
- Scaphander sibogae Schepman, 1913
- Scaphander subglobosus Schepman, 1913
- Shutonia variabilis (Schepman, 1913)
- Splendrillia suluensis (Schepman, 1913)
- Stellatoma rufostrigata (Schepman, 1913)
- Terebra virgo Schepman, 1913
- Trophon celebensis Schepman, 1913
- Typhlosyrinx supracostata (Schepman, 1913)
- Xanthodaphne pyriformis (Schepman, 1913)

1914

- Megadenus voeltzkovi Schepman & Nierstrasz, 1914

1922

- Thaisella dubia (Schepman, 1922)

=== In honor ===
Taxa named in his honor include (sorted chronologically):

Marine snails:

- Epitonium schepmani (Melvill, 1910)
- Argyropeza schepmaniana Melvill, 1912
- Natica schepmani Thiele, 1925
- Pagodidaphne schepmani (Thiele, 1925)
- Trivellona schepmani (Schilder, 1941)
- Lucerapex schepmani Shuto, 1970
- Clavosurcula schepmani Sysoev, 1997
- Mitra schepmani Salisbury & Guillot de Suduiraut, 2003
- Mitrella schepmani Monsecour & Monsecour, 2007

Bivalves:

- Neilonella schepmani Prashad, 1932

== See also ==
- Rudolph Bergh
- Paul Mayer (zoologist)
- Jean Paul Louis Pelseneer
- Edgar Albert Smith
