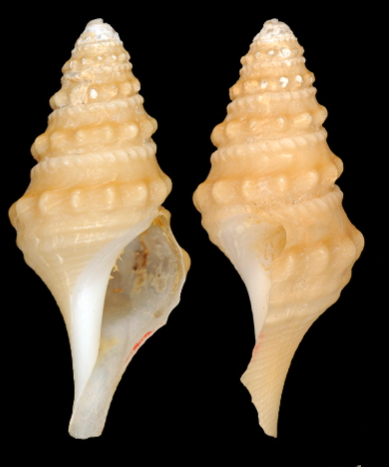
- shell of Comispira obtusigemmata (holotype at Naturalis Biodiversity Center)

Scientific classification
- Kingdom: Animalia
- Phylum: Mollusca
- Class: Gastropoda
- Subclass: Caenogastropoda
- Order: Neogastropoda
- Superfamily: Conoidea
- Family: Cochlespiridae
- Genus: Comispira
- Species: C. obtusigemmata

Binomial name
- Comispira obtusigemmata ( Schepman, 1913)

Synonyms
- Comitas obtusigemmata (Schepman, 1913) superseded combination; Surcula obtusigemmata Schepman, 1913

= Comispira obtusigemmata =

Species of gastropod

Comispira obtusigemmata is a species of sea snail, a marine gastropod mollusc in the family Cochlespiridae.

== Description ==
The length of the shell attains 22.5 mm, its diameter 9.5 mm.

(Original description) The thin shell is broadly fusiform, with a pyramidal spire and a rather long, slender siphonal canal. Its color is yellowish grey. The protoconch of the largest specimen is wanting,. The 6 remaining whorls are not very convex, but apparently so by a row of coarse, obtuse, rounded beads, near the base of upper whorls and the periphery of the body whorl, where they are 14 in number; a second row of small tubercles, rounded in upper whorls, having the character of oblique folds on lower ones, runs just below the deep suture, on a subsutural rib. The lower on the shell is lirate, 2 faint lirae in the interstices of the peripheral beads, 2 strong ones below the beads of the body whorl and numerous fainter ones on the base and the siphonal canal. The shell is covered with very fine growth lines. The body whorl is strongly attenuated below. The aperture is oval, angular above, ending in a rather long, narrow siphonal canal below. The peristome is thin, with a wide, rather shallow sinus above, then strongly protracted. The columellar margin is rather straight, directed to the left near and along the siphonal canal, with a thin layer of white enamel.

== Discussion ==
The species is characterized by a subsutural row of rounded knobs. This is not found in any species of Leucosyrinx or Comitas, but on the contrary present in all species of Sibogasyrinx and Comispira. In shell shape and sculpture the species is quite similar to Comispira mai (Li & Li, 2008) (Kantor et al. 2018), differing in a slightly shorter shell and larger knobs on the shell periphery. Therefore, Surcula obtusigemmata is transferred to Comispira. Conchologically, the species is very similar to Comispira subsuturalis (von Martens, 1901) and both species can be conspecific. Presently, we recognize both species as valid due to significant distance between collecting sites – East Africa for C. subsuturalis and Indonesia for C. obtusigemmata.

== Distribution ==
This marine species occurs off the Makassar Strait, Indonesia at depths between 472 m and 1788 m.
