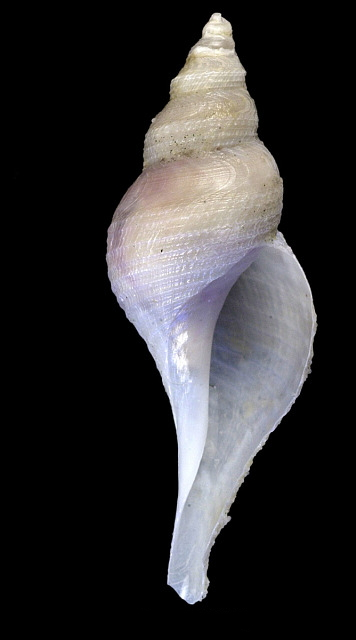
- Shell of Aforia watsoni (specimen at USNM)

Scientific classification
- Kingdom: Animalia
- Phylum: Mollusca
- Class: Gastropoda
- Subclass: Caenogastropoda
- Order: Neogastropoda
- Superfamily: Conoidea
- Family: Cochlespiridae
- Genus: Aforia
- Species: A. watsoni

Binomial name
- Aforia watsoni Kantor, Harasewych & Puillandre, 2016
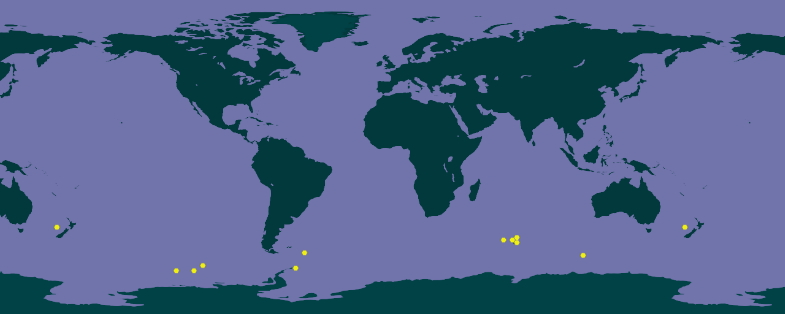

Synonyms
- Aforia lepta (Watson, 1881) (invalid: junior homonym of Pleurotoma lepta Edwards, 1861; Aforia watsoni is a replacement name); Marshallena lepta (Watson, 1881); Pleurotoma (Surcula) lepta Watson, 1881; Pleurotoma lepta Watson, 1881; Pleurotomella (Anomalotomella) frigida (Thiele, 1912)

= Aforia watsoni =

Species of gastropod

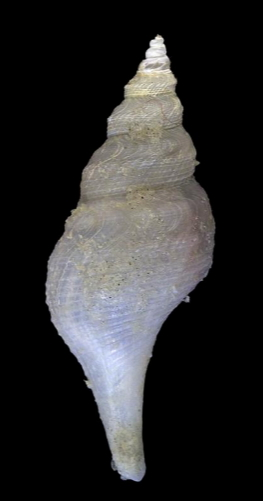
Abapertural view of a shell of Aforia watsoni

Aforia watsoni is a species of sea snail, a marine gastropod mollusc in the family Cochlespiridae.

== Description ==
The shell grows to a length of 30 mm.

== Distribution ==
This marine species is found off New Zealand and in the Southern Ocean, southeast of Australia; also off the Antarctic Peninsula at a depth between 210 m and 220 m.
