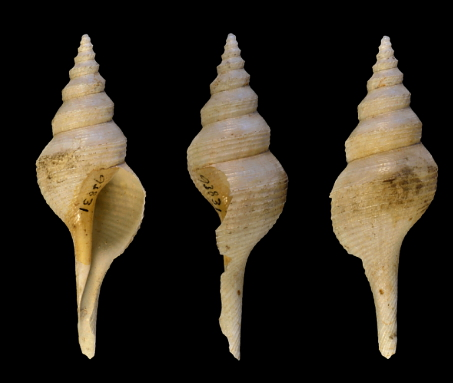
- Shell of Aforia hypomela (holotype at the Smithsonian Institution)

Scientific classification
- Kingdom: Animalia
- Phylum: Mollusca
- Class: Gastropoda
- Subclass: Caenogastropoda
- Order: Neogastropoda
- Superfamily: Conoidea
- Family: Cochlespiridae
- Genus: Aforia
- Species: A. hypomela

Binomial name
- Aforia hypomela (Dall, 1889)
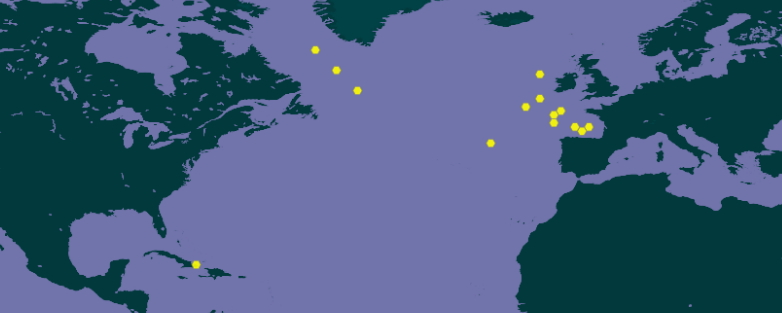

Synonyms
- Irenosyrinx hypomela (Dall, 1889); Irenosyrinx tenerrima (Locard, 1897); Mangilia hypomela Dall, 1889 (original combination); Surcula tenerrima Locard, 1897

= Aforia hypomela =

Species of gastropod

Aforia hypomela is a species of sea snail, a marine gastropod mollusc in the family Cochlespiridae.

== Description ==
The length of the shell attains 59 mm.

(Original description) The thin shell has a fusiform shape, predominantly white with a very thin straw-colored epidermis. The 1½ whorls of the protoconch are white and vitreous, polished, and nearly smooth, featuring faint spiral lines and growth lines. The seven whorls of the teleoconch are adorned with spiral sculpturing, marked by a moderate angulation just behind the periphery of the body whorl. This angulation becomes sharper and more pronounced on the earlier whorls.

In front of this, the whorls are adorned with numerous rounded threads, separated by much wider, somewhat channeled interspaces. On the upper whorls, there are 3-6 of these threads, which extend to the anterior end of the siphonal canal on the body whorl, becoming more crowded towards the anterior. Behind the carina, the shell is smoother with faint, barely raised spirals, which become sparser over the center of the fasciole than on either side. There is no distinct secondary striation. The transverse sculpture consists of faint incremental lines, which rise into small wrinkles at the suture and occasionally cause undulations in the peripheral angulation on the apical whorls. The suture is distinct.

The whorls are moderately full, and the aperture is ovate. The siphonal canal is nearly straight and is narrow. The thin, simple columella is twisted to form a pervious coil that extends the entire length of the axis. The outer lip is thin and modified by the shell's sculpture, with a wide, shallow notch located halfway between the suture and the carina. Additionally, the outer lip is strongly arched forward.

== Distribution ==
This marine species is found in European waters off the British Isles, in the Atlantic Ocean off West Africa and the Sargasso Sea, and in the Caribbean Sea off Cuba.
