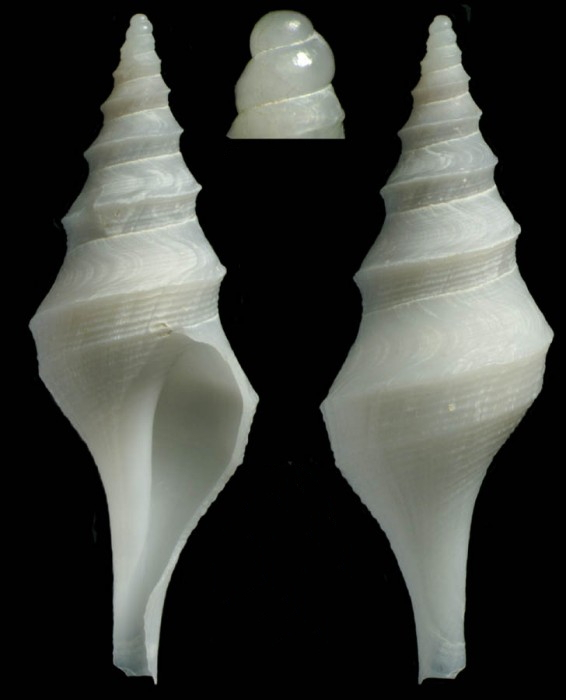
- Shell of Aforia serranoi (holotype)

Scientific classification
- Kingdom: Animalia
- Phylum: Mollusca
- Class: Gastropoda
- Subclass: Caenogastropoda
- Order: Neogastropoda
- Superfamily: Conoidea
- Family: Cochlespiridae
- Genus: Aforia
- Species: A. serranoi

Binomial name
- Aforia serranoi Gofas, Kantor & Luque, 2014
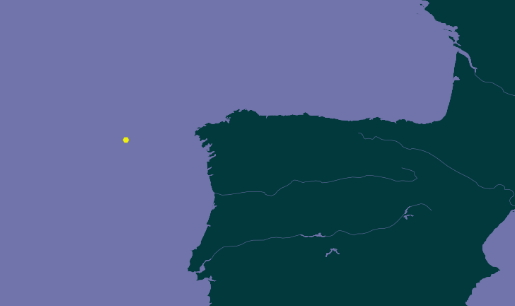

= Aforia serranoi =

Species of gastropod

Aforia serranoi is a species of sea snail, a marine gastropod mollusc in the family Cochlespiridae.

== Description ==
The length of the shell attains 35 mm.

The fusiform shell comprises eight whorls, featuring prominent spiral cords and two keels — one positioned in the middle of the whorls and the other on the body whorl. Additionally, the shell is adorned with fine spiral threads.

== Distribution ==
This species is found in deep waters (at a depth of 1720 m) of the Atlantic Ocean off the Galicia Bank off the Iberian Peninsula.
