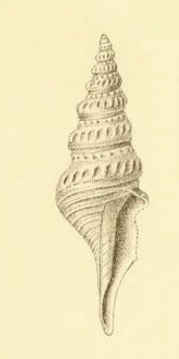
- Original drawing of a shell of Comispira exstructa

Scientific classification
- Kingdom: Animalia
- Phylum: Mollusca
- Class: Gastropoda
- Subclass: Caenogastropoda
- Order: Neogastropoda
- Superfamily: Conoidea
- Family: Cochlespiridae
- Genus: Comispira
- Species: C. exstructa

Binomial name
- Comispira exstructa (von Martens, 1904)

Synonyms
- Comitas exstructa (E. von Martens, 1904) superseded combination; Surcula exstructa Martens, 1904 (original combination)

= Comispira exstructa =

Species of mollusc

Comispira exstructa is a species of sea snail, a marine gastropod mollusc in the family Cochlespiridae.

== Description ==
The length of the shell attains 24 mm, its diameter 7 mm. It is a non-broadcast spawner without a trocophore stage.

(Original description in Latin) The shell is narrowly biconic and sculptured with a single row of small, slightly oblique subsutural nodules, a single row of larger oblique tubercles, and one to two rather thick spiral cords above the suture. It is grayish fawn in color and uniform throughout.

The shell has nine whorls; the first whorl is globose, smooth, and obliquely set. The following whorls bear a single row of tubercles; from the fifth whorl onward, they are somewhat flattened above and bear small subsutural nodules, are slightly angled and tuberculate in the middle, and are then encircled by one to two spiral cords, the first of which touches the tubercles. The suture is rather impressed. The body whorl bears rather strong spiral cords on the lower part, five to six excluding the canal, and it tapers gradually.

The aperture is about half the total shell length and is narrowly ovate. The outer lip is arcuately notched between the suture and the row of tubercles. The siphonal canal is rather long, nearly straight, and broadly open. Its dorsal surface is closely and obliquely spirally grooved. The columellar margin is nearly straight, smooth, and not distinctly delimited.

== Discussion ==
This species is based on a single strongly damaged holotype (length of the shell 24 mm). The original drawing and the details of the sculpture provided by Thiele (1925) show a subsutural row of rounded knobs. These are not found in any species of Leucosyrinx, but are, conversely, present in all species of Sibogasyrinx and Comispira. Based on the broadly-spaced and rather strong spiral cords, the species is attributed to Comispira.

== Distribution ==
This marine species occurs off the Nicobar Islands at depths of more than 800 m.
