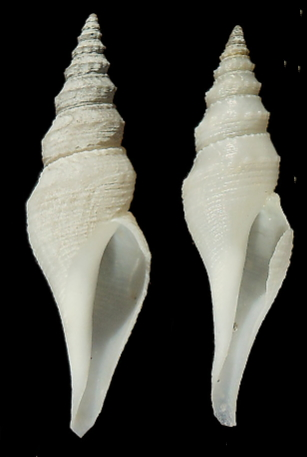
- Shell of Comispira saudesae (paratype)

Scientific classification
- Kingdom: Animalia
- Phylum: Mollusca
- Class: Gastropoda
- Subclass: Caenogastropoda
- Order: Neogastropoda
- Superfamily: Conoidea
- Family: Cochlespiridae
- Genus: Comispira
- Species: C. saudesae

Binomial name
- Comispira saudesae Cossignani, 2018

Synonyms
- Comitas saudesae T. Cossignani, 2018 superseded combination

= Comispira saudesae =

Species of gastropod

Comispira saudesae is a species of sea snail, a marine gastropod mollusc in the family Cochlespiridae.

== Description ==
The length of the shell attains 24 mm.

The species is characterized by a subsutural row of rounded knobs, which are more prominent in the paratypes. This feature is not found in any species of Leucosyrinx or Comitas, but is consistently present in all species of Sibogasyrinx and Comispira. Our specimens closely resemble the type series, particularly the paratypes. Although unpublished, molecular data place the species within Comispira. The known range of the species uis extended from Taiwan to the Philippines.

== Distribution ==
This marine species occurs off Northeast Taiwan; also off the Philippines at depths between 300 m and 500 m.
