= Aforia moskalevi =

Scientific classification
- Kingdom: Animalia
- Phylum: Mollusca
- Class: Gastropoda
- Subclass: Caenogastropoda
- Order: Neogastropoda
- Superfamily: Conoidea
- Family: Cochlespiridae
- Genus: Aforia
- Species: A. moskalevi

Binomial name
- Aforia moskalevi Sysoev & Kantor, 1987

Species of gastropod

Aforia moskalevi is a species of sea snail, a marine gastropod mollusk in the family Cochlespiridae.

== Description ==
The length of the shell attains 33.4 mm, its diameter 12.2 mm.

== Distribution ==
This species occurs in the southwest Pacific Ocean.
