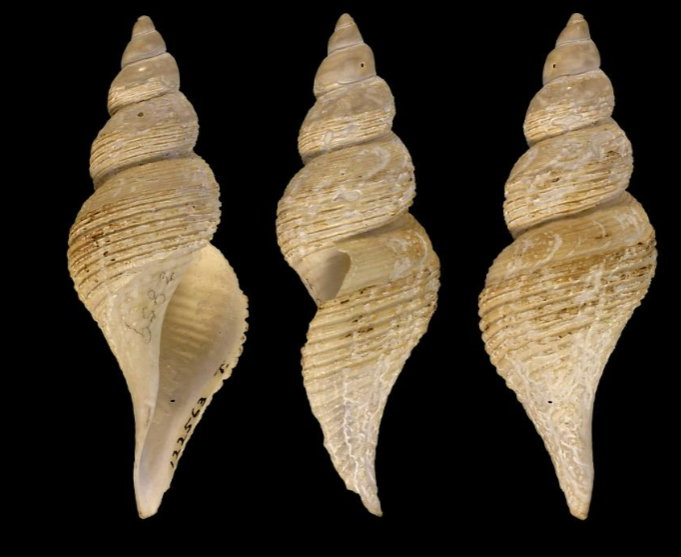
- Shell of Aforia crebristriata (holotype at the Smithsonian Institution)

Scientific classification
- Kingdom: Animalia
- Phylum: Mollusca
- Class: Gastropoda
- Subclass: Caenogastropoda
- Order: Neogastropoda
- Superfamily: Conoidea
- Family: Cochlespiridae
- Genus: Aforia
- Species: A. crebristriata

Binomial name
- Aforia crebristriata (W.H. Dall, 1908)
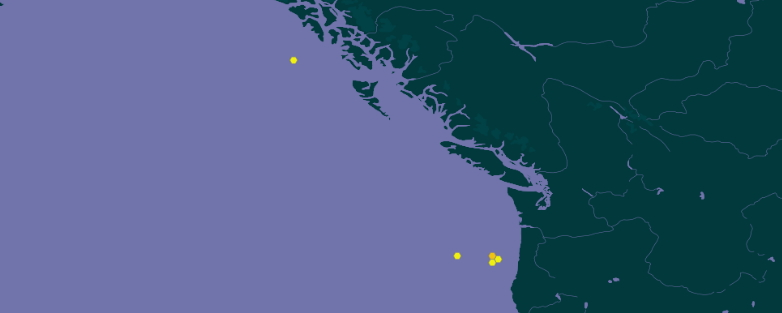

Synonyms
- Aforia (Dallaforia) crebristriata (W.H. Dall, 1908); Irenosyrinx crebristriata W.H. Dall, 1908

= Aforia crebristriata =

Species of gastropod

Aforia crebristriata is a species of sea snail, a marine gastropod mollusk in the family Cochlespiridae.

It is also considered as the type species of the genus Dallaforia through its synonym Irenosyrinx crebristriata Dall, 1908

== Description ==
The length of the shell attains 48 mm, its diameter 16.5 mm.

(Original description) The shell is of moderate size. It is white and is covered with a pale yellow periostracum. The acute spire is slightly shorter than the aperture. The six whorls, excluding the (lost) nucleus, are rounded. The distinct suture is prominent. There is no axial sculpture apart from incremental lines, except on the (eroded) apical whorls.

The siphonal fasciole is wide, extending from the suture to an obscure ridge that forms the shoulder of the whorl just behind the periphery. The fasciole features six or seven smooth, rounded, subequal spiral threads with equal or wider interspaces, which become more crowded anteriorly. Beyond the shoulder, there are nine similar but coarser threads. These threads can be entire, flattened, or even medially sulcate on top, extending over the base. In the region of the siphonal canal, there are more smaller and more distant threads, crossed by obvious incremental lines.

The aperture is elongated and rather narrow, with a very wide but shallow anal sulcus. The outer lip is produced and evenly arcuate to the end of the canal, not constricted at the base of the whorl. The columellar lip is smooth, and the columella is short, obliquely truncate, and gyrate, with a pervious axis. The siphonal canal is wide and barely differentiated.

== Distribution ==
This marine species is found in the upper abyssal regions from Alaska to Oregon, USA.
