= Aforia obesa =

Scientific classification
- Kingdom: Animalia
- Phylum: Mollusca
- Class: Gastropoda
- Subclass: Caenogastropoda
- Order: Neogastropoda
- Superfamily: Conoidea
- Family: Cochlespiridae
- Genus: Aforia
- Species: A. obesa

Binomial name
- Aforia obesa Pastorino & Sánchez, 2016

Species of gastropod

Aforia obesa is a species of sea snails, a marine gastropod mollusc in the family Cochlespiridae.

== Distribution ==
This species is found in deep waters of the Southwestern Atlantic Ocean off Argentina.
