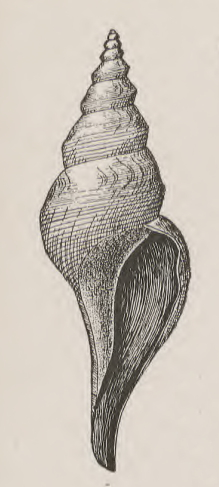
- Drawing of a shell of Aforia persimilis

Scientific classification
- Kingdom: Animalia
- Phylum: Mollusca
- Class: Gastropoda
- Subclass: Caenogastropoda
- Order: Neogastropoda
- Family: Cochlespiridae
- Genus: Aforia
- Species: A. persimilis

Binomial name
- Aforia persimilis (W.H. Dall, 1890)
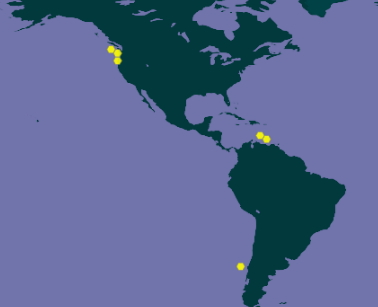

Synonyms
- Leucosyrinx persimilis (Dall, 1890); Leucosyrinx (goodei) persimilis Dall, 1890 (original combination); Pleurotoma (Leucosyrinx) goodei var. persimilis Dall, 1890

= Aforia persimilis =

Species of gastropod

Aforia persimilis is a species of sea snail, a marine gastropod mollusk in the family Cochlespiridae.

Subspecies

- Aforia persimilis blanca (Dall, 1919)
- Aforia persimilis leonis (Dall, 1908)

== Description ==
The length of the shell attains 95 mm, its diameter 32 mm.

The large, white shell features a fusiform shape and a pale olive periostracum. Its acute spire comprises eight whorls, excluding the lost nucleus, each adorned with a peripheral keel. The suture is distinct, and the whorls above the periphery are somewhat flattened, exhibiting a shallow constriction just behind the keel.

The axial sculpture consists solely of incremental lines. The spiral sculpture between the suture and the periphery features numerous flat, subequal, strap-like bands separated by narrower, shallow channels. The periphery displays a low, broad prominence that gives the effect of a keel, adorned with several similar but larger, stronger, and more widely spaced bands, often arranged in pairs, with fine subsidiary spiral striations. This sculptural pattern extends over the anterior half of the whorl, becoming finer and closer on the siphonal canal.

The aperture is elongated, with a sharp, thin outer lip. A wide, deep anal sulcus is present on the posterior slope of the whorl, about midway between the suture and the periphery. The anterior part of the lip is arcuate and protractive. The body, with its sculpture erased, is white and polished. The columella is short and twisted, obliquely truncate in front, gyrate, but not axially pervious, with a touch of brown on the edge. The siphonal canal is wide, elongated, slightly recurved, and lacks a fasciole. The operculum is brown and oval, with an exterior that is imbricately lamellose. Its nucleus is located inside the bluntly rounded apical end.

== Distribution ==
This marine species is found from the Gulf of Panama to Southwest Chile. The subspecies Aforia persimilis blanca was found off Cape Blanco, Oregon, United States, North Pacific Ocean at a depth of 1946 m.
