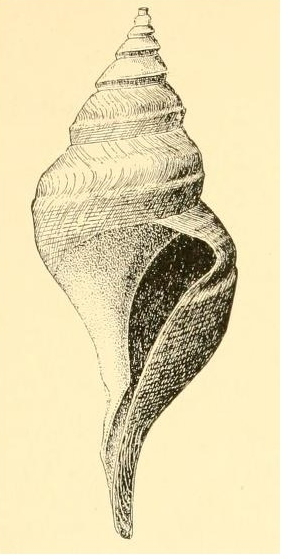
- Original drawing of a shell of Aforia goodei

Scientific classification
- Kingdom: Animalia
- Phylum: Mollusca
- Class: Gastropoda
- Subclass: Caenogastropoda
- Order: Neogastropoda
- Superfamily: Conoidea
- Family: Cochlespiridae
- Genus: Aforia
- Species: A. goodei

Binomial name
- Aforia goodei (R.B. Watson, 1881)
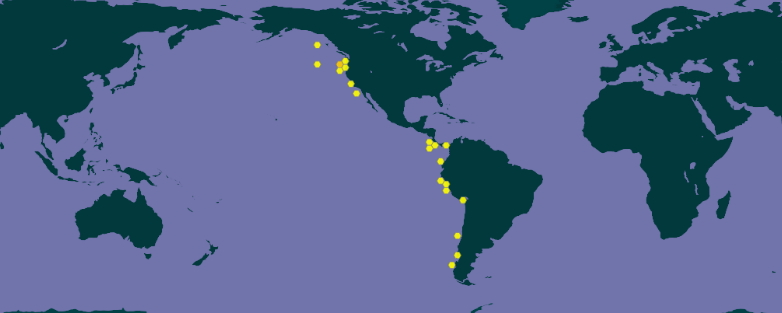

Synonyms
- Leucosyrinx amycus Dall, W.H., 1919; Leucosyrinx goodei Dall, 1890 (original combination); Pleurotoma (Leucosyrinx) goodei Dall, 1890; Pleurotoma goodei Dall, 1890

= Aforia goodei =

Species of gastropod

Aforia goodei, common name Goode's turrid, is a species of sea snail, a marine gastropod mollusk in the family Turridae, the turrids.

== Description ==
The length of the shell varies between 50 mm and 90 mm.

(Original description) The shell is large and thin, predominantly white with a hint of pale orange in the throat and on the columella. It comprises eight or more whorls, with the protoconch missing in the specimens examined. The surface is generally slightly eroded but glistens when in perfect condition. Below the periphery, the spiral sculpture features narrow, shallow grooves that separate wider, almost obsolete threads. At the periphery, there is an obtuse carina that is sharper on the early whorls. Behind this carina is a wide, shallow sulcus, followed by the whorl rounding towards the distinct but unchannelled suture. The upper or posterior part of the whorl shows fine spirals that are perceptible but fainter than those in front of the periphery.

The transverse sculpture consists solely of incremental lines. The aperture is elongated and moderately wide, with a wide, rounded anal notch. The fasciole is slightly raised but not strongly differentiated. The body of the shell features a thin, transparent glaze. The columella is robust, obliquely truncate, flaring, and nearly pervious, with an anterior section that is more or less tinged with pale orange. The siphonal canal is long, thin, shallow, and slightly recurved. The outer lip is prominent below the periphery, thin and sharp.

The operculum features an apical nucleus, with subsequent growth showing a tendency towards slight spirality. As it continues to grow, the spirality becomes enclosed by additions made all around the margin, resulting in an adult operculum that appears buccinoid in shape. This buccinoid outline, with the nuclear part enclosed in the lower right-hand section, is a distinctive characteristic rather than a deformity. It is common to several species of Leucosyrinx that the author has examined. This unique form of the operculum represents a gradual evolutionary progression, through different species, towards the typical Pleurotomoid operculum.

(Description as Aforia goodei) The white shell has an ashy brown periostracum and six or more whorls, the apex eroded. The suture is slightly appressed, especially on the spire. The anal fasciole is wide and deep, somewhat in front of the suture and extending to a moderate peripheral carina. Behind the carina, the shell is feebly, and in front of it strongly spirally grooved with wider flat interspaces. The aperture is simple. The outer lip is thin and produced. The inner lip is erased and white. The columella is gyrate and impervious. The siphonal canal is distinct and slightly recurved.

== Distribution ==
This species occurs in the Pacific Ocean from British Columbia, Canada to Chile.
