= Aforia staminea =

Scientific classification
- Kingdom: Animalia
- Phylum: Mollusca
- Class: Gastropoda
- Subclass: Caenogastropoda
- Order: Neogastropoda
- Superfamily: Conoidea
- Family: Cochlespiridae
- Genus: Aforia
- Species: A. staminea

Binomial name
- Aforia staminea (R.B. Watson, 1881)
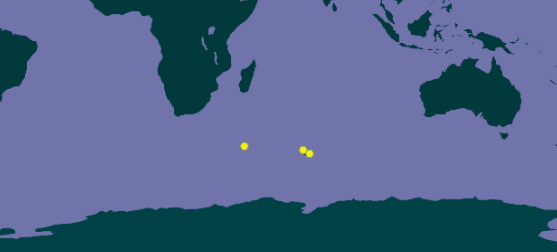

Synonyms
- Pleurotoma staminea Watson, 1881; Pleurotoma (Surcula) staminea R.B. Watson, 1881 (original combination)

Species of gastropod

Aforia staminea is a species of sea snail, a marine gastropod mollusk in the family Cochlespiridae.

== Description ==
The high, narrow, shell grows to a length of 35 mm.

This thin, translucent white shell is biconically fusiform, scalariform, and carinated with spiral threads. Its sculpture features coarse, sinuous, and irregular growth lines. Above the middle of each whorl, there is a prominent carination that projects slightly. The body whorl tends to exhibit a secondary carination. The entire surface is covered with unequal and irregular threads, as well as somewhat broken microscopic lines.

(Original description) The high, narrow shell has a biconically fusiform shape and is scalar and carinated with spiral threads. It is thin and white. The axial sculpture features coarse, irregular, sinuous growth lines, with no other longitudinal markings. The spiral sculpture includes a strong carination above the middle of each whorl, which slightly projects. This carination is distinguished by the angulation of the whorl and the prominence of the thread on its crest.

On the body whorl, there is a tendency for a second carination, which extends into the aperture just below the junction of the outer lip and is thus concealed on all the earlier whorls. This inferior angulation varies significantly among individuals. Additionally, the entire surface is covered with irregular and unequal threads, which are feeblest on the sloping shoulder below the suture. Close below the upper keel and on the snout and its conical base, the threads are finer. Among these, about four threads above and two below the lower keel are the strongest. However, all threads tend to subdivide, and the entire shell is scored by irregular and somewhat broken microscopic lines.

The shell is a translucent white beneath a thin, pale, greyish-yellow epidermis that adheres closely but is prone to wear away.

The spire is high, narrow, conical, and slopingly scalar due to the drooping shoulder between the suture and the keel. The apex is more or less eroded in all four specimens and consists of no more than 1 1/4 embryonic whorls, which are globose, smooth, and with the point slightly obliquely pressed down. The spire consists of 8 1/2 whorls, rather short except for the last, with a regular increase in size, and is angulated above the middle. The shoulder between the suture and the keel is straight-lined. From the keel, the whorls are slightly contracted to the inferior suture, with a profile line that is scarcely convex.

The body whorl is slightly swollen below the keel and extends from a produced conical base into a long, narrow, cylindrical, and very slightly upturned snout, which projects to the right side of the base. The suture is a fine, sharp, and slightly irregular line, well defined by the contraction of the whorl above and the straight line of the shoulder on the whorl below.

The aperture is club-shaped, being oval above and prolonged below into a long but not very narrow siphonal canal. The canal is slightly sinuous and widens towards its end due to the oblique cutting-away of the columellar lip.

The outer lip is thin, sharp, and patulous, leaving the body at a right angle and advancing quite straight to the keel. Above the keel lies a deep, thin-lipped, U-shaped sinus, with its lower margin parallel to, but slightly above, the carinal thread. From the keel, the lip edge advances with a long, free, forward curve and a sinuous double sweep, first convex and then concave, to the point of the snout, where the edge is prominent, rounded, and patulous.

The columellar lip is almost hyaline, cut into the substance of the body whorl but not extending beyond the edge of the aperture. It is slightly concave above, straight in the middle, and very early and obliquely cut away in front. From this point, for the sixth of an inch, it advances to the extreme point of the shell as a delicate, thin, sharp lamina bordering the siphonal canal. The operculum appears to have been broken, likely during an attempt to extract it, but it is evidently small, thin, and pale yellow.

== Distribution ==
This species is distributed in the Southern Indian Ocean; also in the southern Atlantic Ocean off the Kerguelen Islands and Prince Edward Island and the Falkland Islands.
