= Aforia tasmanica =

Scientific classification
- Kingdom: Animalia
- Phylum: Mollusca
- Class: Gastropoda
- Subclass: Caenogastropoda
- Order: Neogastropoda
- Superfamily: Conoidea
- Family: Cochlespiridae
- Genus: Aforia
- Species: A. tasmanica

Binomial name
- Aforia tasmanica Sysoev & Kantor, 1988

Species of gastropod

Aforia tasmanica is a species of sea snail, a marine gastropod mollusk in the family Cochlespiridae.

== Distribution ==
This marine species is found off Tasmania.
