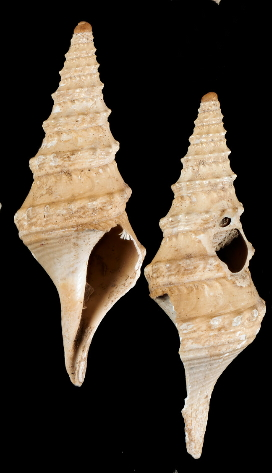
- Shell of Comispira erica (syntype in the Museum für Naturkunde, Berlin)

Scientific classification
- Kingdom: Animalia
- Phylum: Mollusca
- Class: Gastropoda
- Subclass: Caenogastropoda
- Order: Neogastropoda
- Superfamily: Conoidea
- Family: Cochlespiridae
- Genus: Comispira
- Species: C. erica

Binomial name
- Comispira erica (Thiele, 1925)

Synonyms
- Comitas erica (Thiele, 1925) superseded combination; Leucosyrinx erica Thiele, 1925 (basionym)

= Comispira erica =

Species of gastropod

Comispira erica is a species of sea snail, a marine gastropod mollusc in the family Cochlespiridae.

== Description ==
The type series consists of 3 shells, one complete (length of the shell 20.1 mm), one juvenile and one broken. The species is characterized by a subsutural row of rounded knobs. This is not found in any species of Leucosyrinx, but on the contrary present in all species of Sibogasyrinx and Comispira. Based on the spiral sculpture pattern this species is conditionally attributed to Comispira.

== Distribution ==
This marine species occurs off Zanzibar, Maldive Islands and Sumatra, Indonesia.
