= Aforia indomaris =

Scientific classification
- Kingdom: Animalia
- Phylum: Mollusca
- Class: Gastropoda
- Subclass: Caenogastropoda
- Order: Neogastropoda
- Superfamily: Conoidea
- Family: Cochlespiridae
- Genus: Aforia
- Species: A. indomaris

Binomial name
- Aforia indomaris Sysoev & Kantor, 1988

Synonyms
- Aforia (Dallaforia) indomaris Sysoev, A.V. & Yu.I. Kantor, 1988

Species of gastropod

Aforia indomaris is a species of sea snail, a marine gastropod mollusk in the family Cochlespiridae.

== Distribution ==
This species occurs in the Indian Ocean off the Seychelles.
