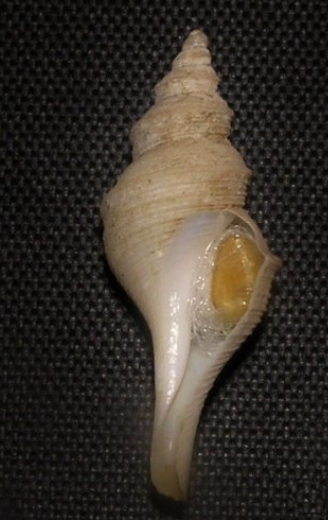
- Shell of Aforia goniodes

Scientific classification
- Kingdom: Animalia
- Phylum: Mollusca
- Class: Gastropoda
- Subclass: Caenogastropoda
- Order: Neogastropoda
- Superfamily: Conoidea
- Family: Cochlespiridae
- Genus: Aforia
- Species: A. goniodes

Binomial name
- Aforia goniodes (R.B. Watson, 1881)
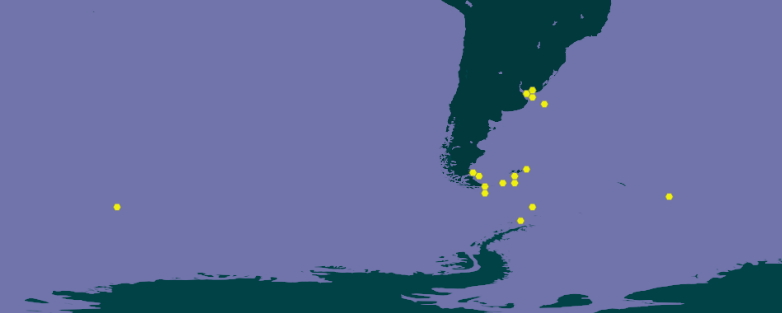

Synonyms
- Aforia gonoides (Watson, 1881) (misspelling); Pleurotoma (Surcula) goniodes Watson, 1881 (basionym); Pleurotoma clara Martens, E.C. von, 1880 (invalid: junior homonym of Pleurotoma clara Reeve, 1845); Pleurotoma goniodes Watson, 1881

= Aforia goniodes =

Species of gastropod

Aforia goniodes is a species of sea snail, a marine gastropod mollusk in the family Cochlespiridae.

== Description ==
The shell size varies between 40 mm and 85 mm

(Original description) The high, narrow shell exhibits a biconical shape, with a subscalar profile. It features a long, unconstricted base and a nearly equal-sided snout, which is angulated by a pronounced keel and adorned with regular fine spiral threads throughout.

The axial sculpture consists solely of fine, regular, close, hair-like growth lines. The spiral sculpture is marked by a strong angulation in the middle of each whorl, created by the straight, drooping line of the shoulder and the straight, contracting line descending to the inferior suture. This angulation pinches out into a sharp, round-edged keel. Fine, sharp threads cover the entire surface, evenly distributed and of equal strength. On the penultimate whorl, there are about six such threads below the keel, separated by flat, broad intervals that are prominently scored with growth lines

The colour of the shell is white under a yellow epidermis.

The spire is high, narrow, and conical, with profile lines interrupted by the straight-lined contraction of the shell between the keels of successive whorls. The small, rounded apex is eroded. The spire consists of 6-7 whorls, each with a profile of two straight lines meeting at the keel, which bisects the whorls. Above the keel is a gradually sloping shoulder, and below it, a gradual contraction to the suture.

The body whorl is scarcely convex on the conical base, which contracts regularly to the long, nearly equal-sided snout. The suture is fine, linear, and well defined. The aperture is club-shaped, rhomboidal above, with a long, narrow siphonal canal below. The outer lip is high-arched and then straight along the siphonal canal. Its edge retreats immediately to the left, forming a remote, deep, rounded sinus in the shoulder above the keel. Below this, it sweeps out into a high and prominent shoulder.

== Distribution ==
This species occurs in the cold waters off Patagonia, Tierra del Fuego, the Falkland Islands and the South Shetlands.
