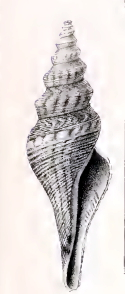
- Original image of a shell of Nihonia circumstricta

Scientific classification
- Kingdom: Animalia
- Phylum: Mollusca
- Class: Gastropoda
- Subclass: Caenogastropoda
- Order: Neogastropoda
- Superfamily: Conoidea
- Family: Cochlespiridae
- Genus: Nihonia
- Species: N. circumstricta

Binomial name
- Nihonia circumstricta (Martens, 1901)

Synonyms
- Pleurotoma (Surcula) circumstricta Martens, 1901; Surcula circumstricta (Martens, 1901)

= Nihonia circumstricta =

Species of gastropod

Nihonia circumstricta is a species of sea snail, a marine gastropod mollusk in the family Cochlespiridae.

== Description ==
The length of the shell varies between 50 mm and 65 mm, its diameter between 15.5 mm and 19 mm. The shell has an elongate-fusiform shape. It contains 9 weakly angulate whorls.

== Distribution ==
This species occurs in the Indian Ocean off Tanzania at depths between 300–400 m.
