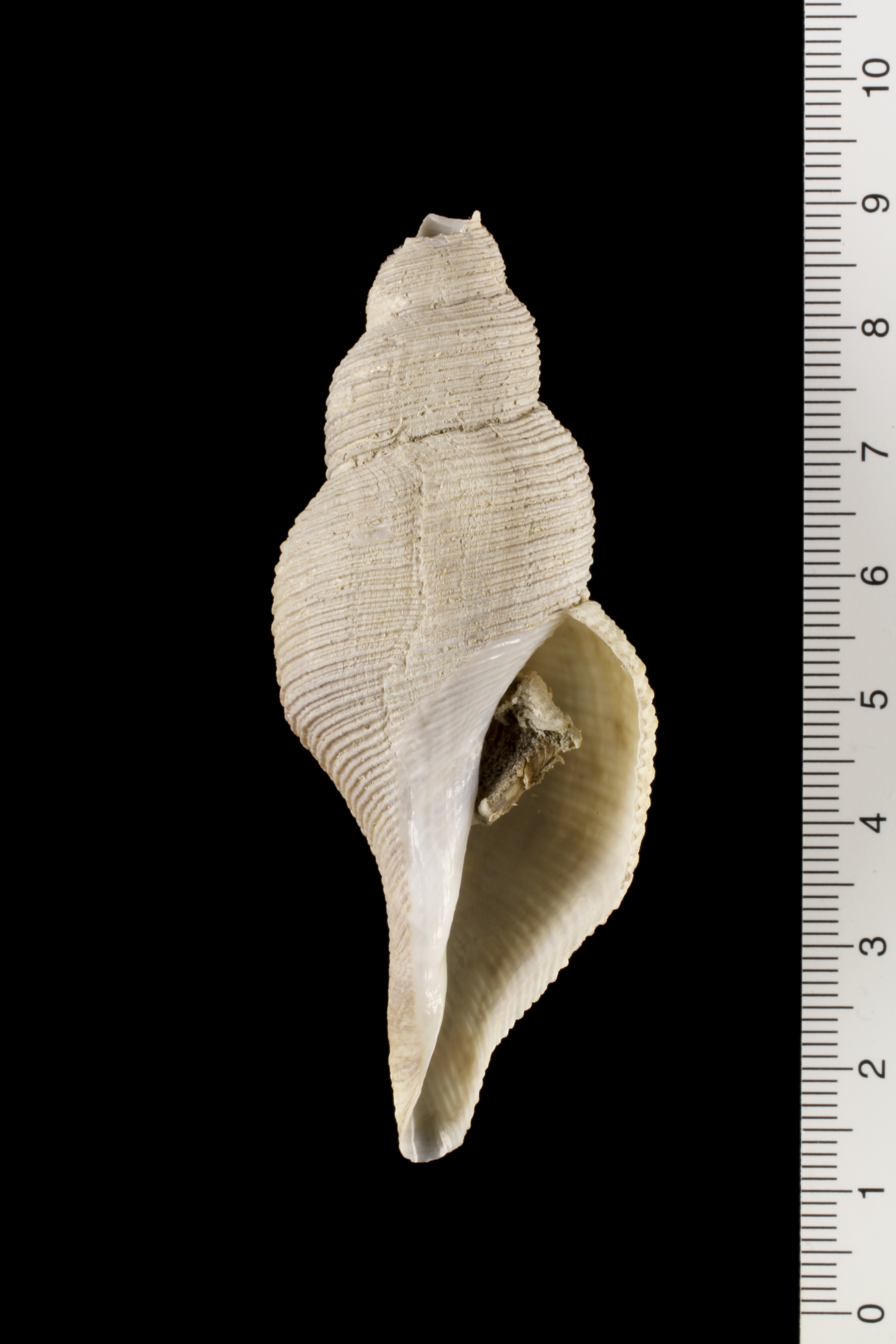
- Shell of Aforia hedleyi (holotype at the Smithsonian Institution)

Scientific classification
- Kingdom: Animalia
- Phylum: Mollusca
- Class: Gastropoda
- Subclass: Caenogastropoda
- Order: Neogastropoda
- Superfamily: Conoidea
- Family: Cochlespiridae
- Genus: Aforia
- Species: A. hedleyi

Binomial name
- Aforia hedleyi (Dell, 1990)
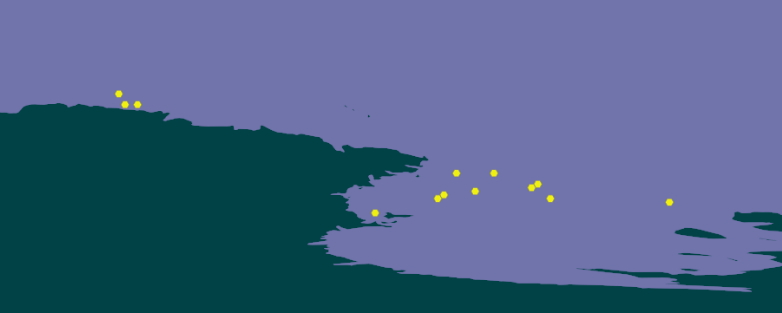

Synonyms
- Pontiothauma hedleyi Dell, 1990 (original combination)

= Aforia hedleyi =

Species of gastropod

Aforia hedleyi is a species of sea snail, a marine gastropod mollusk in the family Cochlespiridae.

== Distribution ==
This species occurs in Antarctic waters at a depth between 498 m and 569 m.
