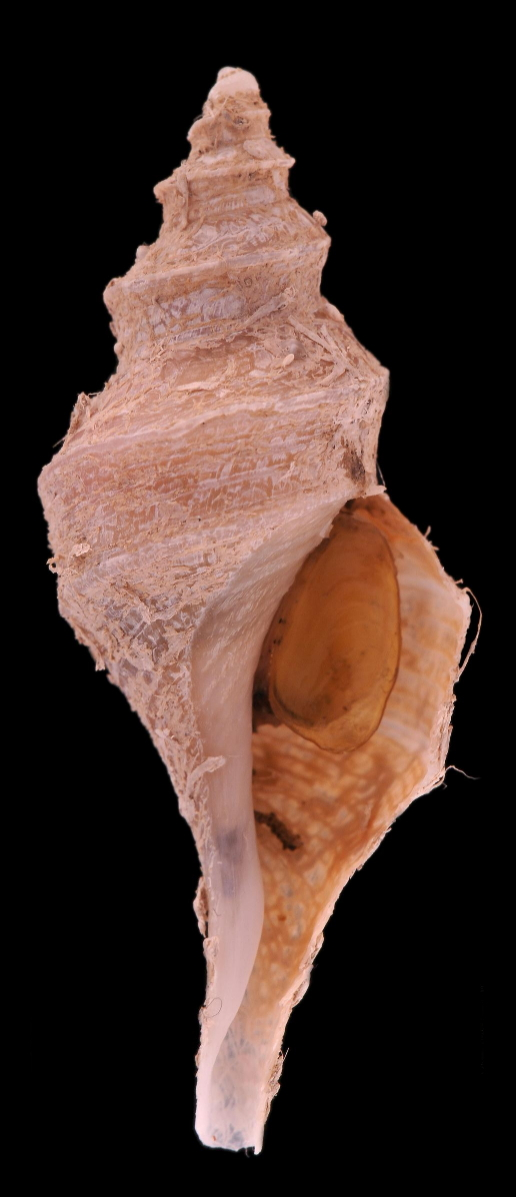
- Shell of Aforia multispiralis (specimen at the Smithsonian Institution)

Scientific classification
- Kingdom: Animalia
- Phylum: Mollusca
- Class: Gastropoda
- Subclass: Caenogastropoda
- Order: Neogastropoda
- Superfamily: Conoidea
- Family: Cochlespiridae
- Genus: Aforia
- Species: A. multispiralis

Binomial name
- Aforia multispiralis Dell, 1990
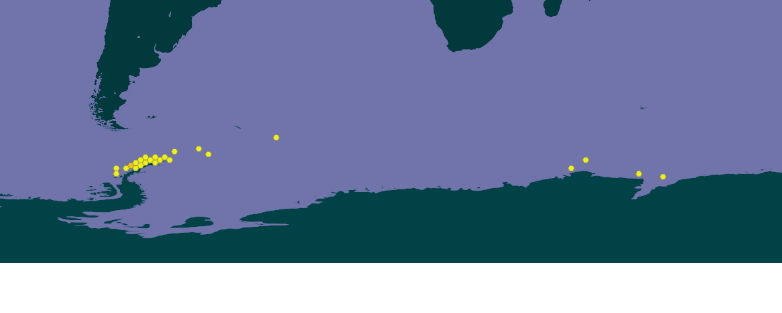

Synonyms
- Danilacarina elenae Bozzetti, 1997

= Aforia multispiralis =

Species of gastropod

Aforia multispiralis is a species of sea snail, a marine gastropod mollusk in the family Cochlespiridae.

== Description ==
The size of an adult shell varies between 40 mm and 90 mm.

== Distribution ==
This species is found in the cold waters of the South Orkneys, the South Shetland Islands, Kerguelen Island and the Antarctic Peninsula.
