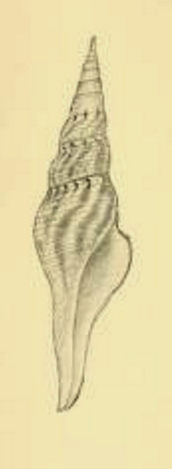
- Original image if a shell of Nihonia mirabilis

Scientific classification
- Kingdom: Animalia
- Phylum: Mollusca
- Class: Gastropoda
- Subclass: Caenogastropoda
- Order: Neogastropoda
- Superfamily: Conoidea
- Family: Cochlespiridae
- Genus: Nihonia
- Species: N. mirabilis

Binomial name
- Nihonia mirabilis (G.B. Sowerby III, 1914)

Synonyms
- Fusosurcula mirabilis (Sowerby III, 1914); Orihosurcula mirabilis (Sowerby III, 1914); Pleurotoma (Surcula) mirabilis Sowerby III, 1914 (original combination); Turricula (Orthosiircula) mirabilis (Sowerby III, 1914)

= Nihonia mirabilis =

Species of gastropod

Nihonia mirabilis, the remarkable turrid, is a species of sea snail, a marine gastropod mollusk in the family Cochlespiridae.

== Description ==
The length of the shell attains 90 mm, its diameter 24 mm. The buff shell has an elongate-fusiform shape. It shows broad, reddish-brown longitudinal flames. The long siphonal canal is straight and unnotched, showing primary and secondary spirals. The shell contains 11 1/2 moderately convex whorls, including 1 1/2 smooth whorls in the protoconch. The spîral sculpture shows prominent spiral cords and numerous interstitial spiral threads. The axial sculpture shows many weak growth lines. The body whorl contains twelve primary spiral cords and measures two-thirds of the total length of the shell. The thin outer lip is arcuately produced. The aperture is oblong and ovate.

== Distribution ==
This marine species occurs off Japan.
