= Steiraxis aulaca =

Scientific classification
- Kingdom: Animalia
- Phylum: Mollusca
- Class: Gastropoda
- Subclass: Caenogastropoda
- Order: Neogastropoda
- Superfamily: Conoidea
- Family: Cochlespiridae
- Genus: Steiraxis
- Species: S. aulaca

Binomial name
- Steiraxis aulaca (W. H. Dall, 1896)

Synonyms
- Aforia (Steiraxis) aulaca aulaca (Dall, 1896); Pleurotoma (Steiraxis) aulaca Dall, 1896 (original combination); Steilaxis aulaca (Dall, 1896)

Species of gastropod

Steiraxis aulaca is a species of sea snail, a marine gastropod mollusk in the family Cochlespiridae.

== Description ==
The length of the shell attains 60 mm, its diameter 26 mm.

(Original description) The large, solid shell is white and has a fusiform shape. It contains about five whorls (nucleus eroded) covered with a pale straw-colored epidermis. The whorls are rounded, with rather distinct lines of growth crossed by numerous very sharp, narrow, prominent subequal spiral ridges with about equal or narrower interspaces. The periphery is formed by a sort of rib, on which stand two to four similar keels, but smaller than the others and more crowded. In front of the rib there is a faint constriction of the whorl. The keels are less prominent on the siphonal canal, which is moderately long and recurved. On the penultimate whorl there are about 14 keels between the sutures. The aperture is elongate, reflecting the sculpture, but without lirae. The outer lip is very flexuous, with a broad, rather shallow anal sulcus behind, and is arched forward in front of the peripheral rib. The body is white, not callous. The columella is thin, attenuated, and obliquely truncate in front, concave, twisted, exhibiting a pervious axis. The siphonal canal is shallow, not producing a fasciole. The initiatory part of the operculum is spiral.

== Distribution ==
This species occurs in the Pacific Ocean off Mexico and in the Gulf of Panama.
