= Aforia inoperculata =

Scientific classification
- Kingdom: Animalia
- Phylum: Mollusca
- Class: Gastropoda
- Subclass: Caenogastropoda
- Order: Neogastropoda
- Superfamily: Conoidea
- Family: Cochlespiridae
- Genus: Aforia
- Species: A. inoperculata

Binomial name
- Aforia inoperculata Sysoev & Kantor, 1988

Synonyms
- Aforia (Aforia) inoperculata Sysoev & Kantor, 1988 · accepted, alternate representation

Species of gastropod

Aforia inoperculata is a species of sea snail, a marine gastropod mollusk in the family Cochlespiridae.

== Distribution ==
This marine species occurs off East Japan.
