= Aforia trilix =

Scientific classification
- Kingdom: Animalia
- Phylum: Mollusca
- Class: Gastropoda
- Subclass: Caenogastropoda
- Order: Neogastropoda
- Superfamily: Conoidea
- Family: Cochlespiridae
- Genus: Aforia
- Species: A. trilix

Binomial name
- Aforia trilix (R.B. Watson, 1881)
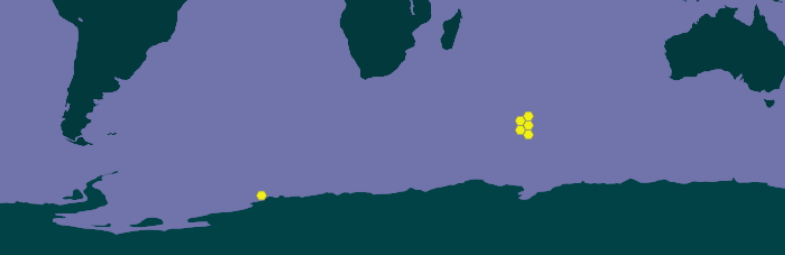

Synonyms
- Pleurotoma (Surcula) trilix R. B. Watson, 1881 superseded combination; Pleurotoma trilix Watson, 1881

Species of gastropod

Aforia trilix is a species of sea snail, a marine gastropod mollusk in the family Cochlespiridae.

== Description ==
(Original description) The high, very narrow shell has a biconically fusiform shape. It is subscalar, bicarinated, strong, and white.

The axial sculpture features numerous unequal, strong, harsh, flexuous lines of growth, with occasional lines that are stronger than the rest. The spiral sculpture displays two keels: the upper and stronger keel is slightly above the middle of the whorls, sharply pinched out but with a rounded edge. There is a drooping, straight-lined shoulder above, and the whorl is somewhat contracted below it, giving it considerable prominence.

The lower keel is a rounded, rather prominent thread that stands out due to the contraction of the whorl below it into the suture. Between these two keels, roughly in the middle, lies a thread more pronounced than the others. Coarse, unequal, and interrupted threads closely cover the entire surface. Two or three of these threads, in line with the sinus on the shoulder between the upper keel and the suture, are somewhat stronger, more regular, and swollen than the rest. The surface is almost free of spiral threads just below this point, where the lines marking the lower edge of the sinus run.

The shell is porcellanous white. The epidermis is extremely thin, smooth, and pale yellowish.

The spire is high, narrow, and subscalar. The apex consists of 1¼ embryonic whorls, which are globose, smooth, and slightly obliquely pressed down on one side at the extreme point. The 7½ whorls are narrow and angulated, with a straight, drooping shoulder below the suture, slightly concave between the keels, and contracted into the lower suture. The base is conical and projects on the right side into a long, narrow, somewhat twisted snout. The suture is a fine, sharp, deeply impressed line.

The aperture is club-shaped, being oval above with a sharp angulation at the upper point, and prolonged into a long, relatively narrow, but slightly widening siphonal canal, which is open due to the oblique cutting away of the columellar lip. The outer lip is thin, sharp, and patulous, with a slight contraction at the edge of the siphonal canal. It leaves the body nearly at a right angle and advances with a very slight convexity to the keel. Above the keel lies a deep, thin-lipped, U-shaped sinus, whose lower margin is parallel to, but slightly above, the conical thread.

From the keel, the lip's edge is first convex and then slightly receding at the front, while on the side, it is first convex and then concave to the point of the snout, where it becomes very straight. The columellar lip has a thin, porcellaneous glaze that spreads slightly on the body, from which the spirals are cut somewhat away. The lip is slightly concave above, then straight, and early and obliquely cut away at the front of the columella, where it is slightly prominent, finally running out to the point of the snout as a thin edge bordering the siphonal canal.

== Distribution ==
This species is found in the Southern Indian Ocean between Kerguelen and Heard Island.
