= Aforia abyssalis =

Scientific classification
- Kingdom: Animalia
- Phylum: Mollusca
- Class: Gastropoda
- Subclass: Caenogastropoda
- Order: Neogastropoda
- Superfamily: Conoidea
- Family: Cochlespiridae
- Genus: Aforia
- Species: A. abyssalis

Binomial name
- Aforia abyssalis Sysoev & Kantor, 1987
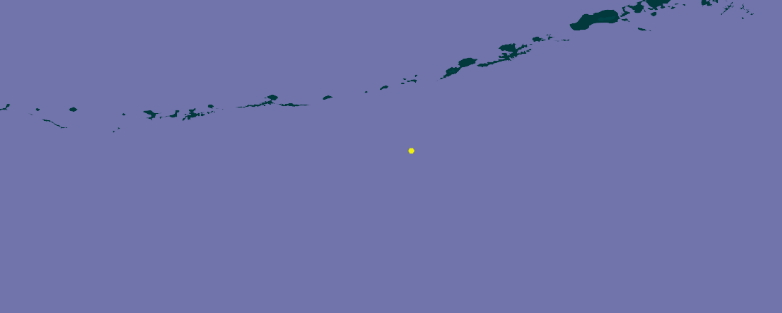

Synonyms
- Aforia (Abyssaforia) abyssalis Sysoev & Kantor, 1987

Species of gastropod

Aforia abyssalis is a species of sea snail, a marine gastropod mollusk in the family Cochlespiridae.

This species is also considered the type species of Abyssaforia Sysoev & Kantor, 1987

== Distribution ==
This marine species is found off Hokkaido, Japan and the Kuril Islands, Russian Federation.
