= Aforia kupriyanovi =

Scientific classification
- Kingdom: Animalia
- Phylum: Mollusca
- Class: Gastropoda
- Subclass: Caenogastropoda
- Order: Neogastropoda
- Superfamily: Conoidea
- Family: Cochlespiridae
- Genus: Aforia
- Species: A. kupriyanovi

Binomial name
- Aforia kupriyanovi Sysoev & Kantor, 1987

Synonyms
- Aforia (Abyssaforia) kupriyanovi Sysoev & Kantor, 1987

Species of gastropod

Aforia kupriyanovi is a species of sea snail, a marine gastropod mollusk in the family Cochlespiridae.

== Distribution ==
This marine species is found off Northern Chile.
