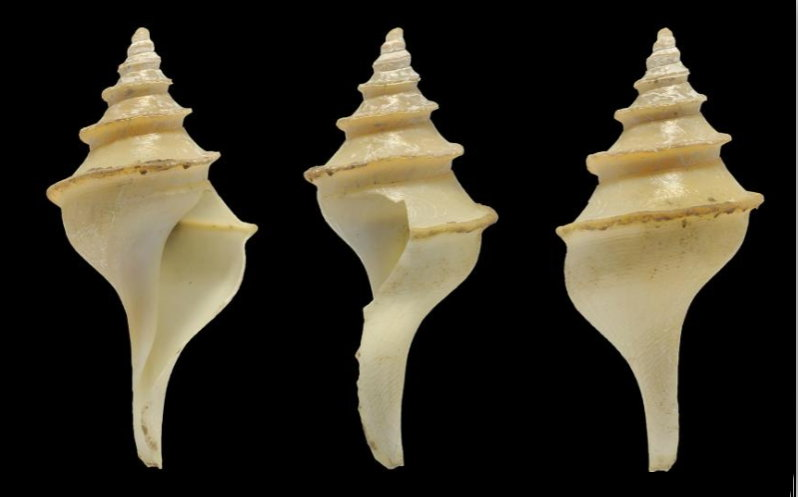
- Shell of Aforia kincaidi (holotype at the Smithsonian Institution)

Scientific classification
- Kingdom: Animalia
- Phylum: Mollusca
- Class: Gastropoda
- Subclass: Caenogastropoda
- Order: Neogastropoda
- Superfamily: Conoidea
- Family: Cochlespiridae
- Genus: Aforia
- Species: A. kincaidi

Binomial name
- Aforia kincaidi (W. H. Dall, 1919)
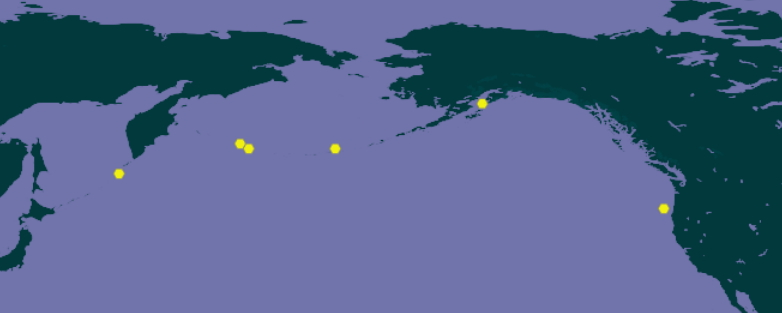

Synonyms
- Leucosyrinx kincaidi Dall, 1919

= Aforia kincaidi =

Species of gastropod

Aforia kincaidi is a species of sea snail, a marine gastropod mollusk in the family Cochlespiridae.

== Description ==
The height of the shell attains 29 mm, its diameter 13 mm.

(Original description) The shell, waxen white and moderately sized, has a fusiform shape with an acute spire. The siphonal canal is elongated. The protoconch consists of two smooth, bulbous whorls, followed by five additional whorls.

The axial sculpture exhibits only faint incremental lines. The spiral sculpture features a very prominent, thin, sharp peripheral keel and fine spiral striae with wider interspaces covering most of the surface. Toward the base, the interspaces become more rounded and coarser in texture.

The entire area between the keel and the preceding suture forms the anal fasciole, with a wide arcuate sulcus situated just ahead of the suture. The base of the shell is neatly rounded and tapers at the beginning of the siphonal canal. The outer lip is thin, sharp, and extends prominently forward. The inner lip is slightly erased. The columella slopes obliquely and tapers towards the front, exhibiting a gyrate shape with a minutely pervious axis. The siphonal canal is narrow and slender. The operculum is yellowish, ovate, and features an apical nucleus.

== Distribution ==
This species occurs in the northern Pacific Ocean off Alaska, United States and the Russian Federation.
