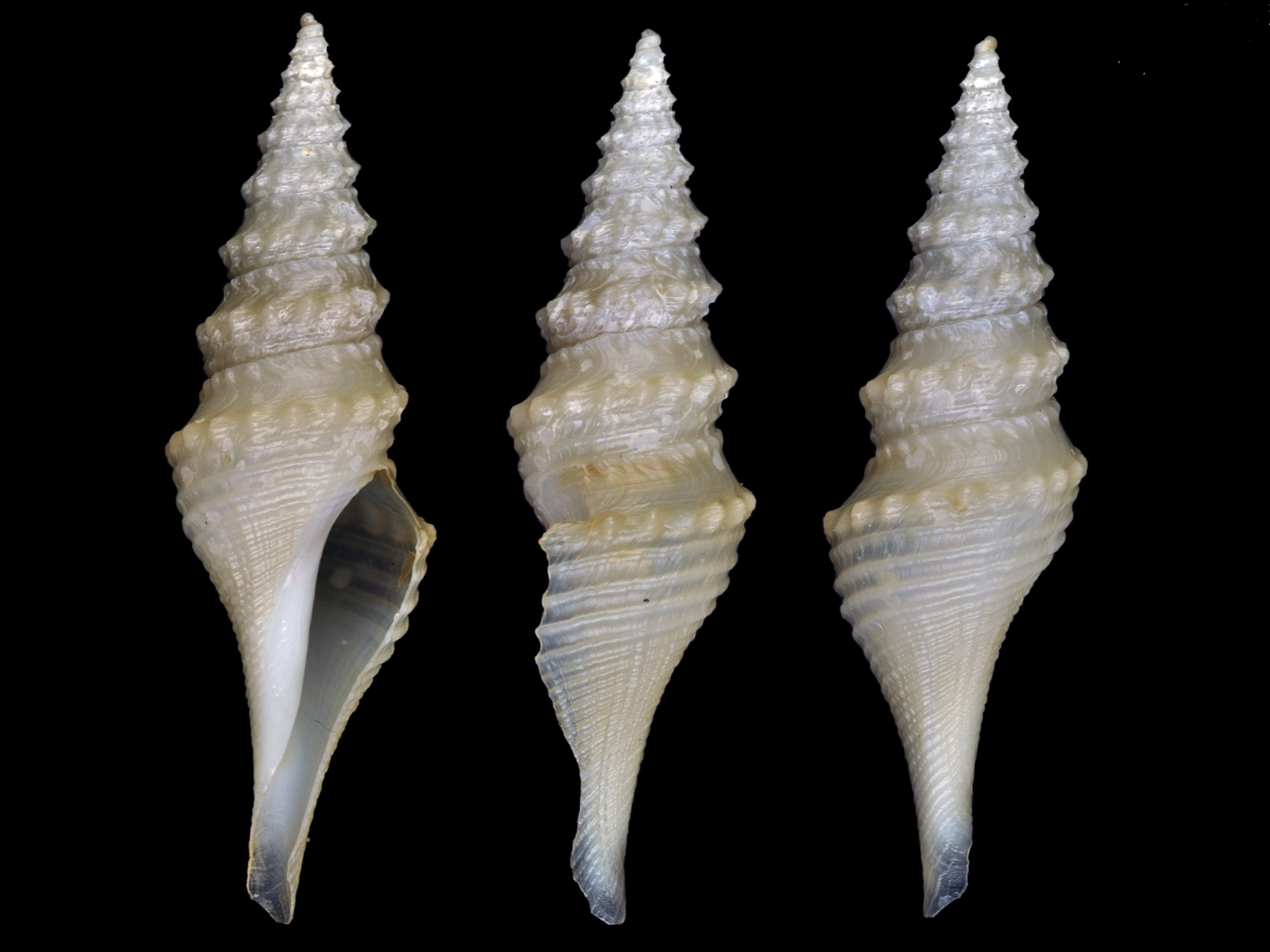
- Shells of Comispira compta (holotype at MNHN, Paris)

Scientific classification
- Kingdom: Animalia
- Phylum: Mollusca
- Class: Gastropoda
- Subclass: Caenogastropoda
- Order: Neogastropoda
- Superfamily: Conoidea
- Family: Cochlespiridae
- Genus: Comispira
- Species: C. compta

Binomial name
- Comispira compta Kantor, Fedosov & Puillandre, 2018

= Comispira compta =

Species of gastropod

Comispira compta is a species of sea snail, a deep-water marine gastropod mollusk in the family Cochlespiridae.

== Description ==
The length of the shell found is 24.4 mm.

== Distribution ==
This species has been found in the Bismarck Sea off Papua New Guinea.
