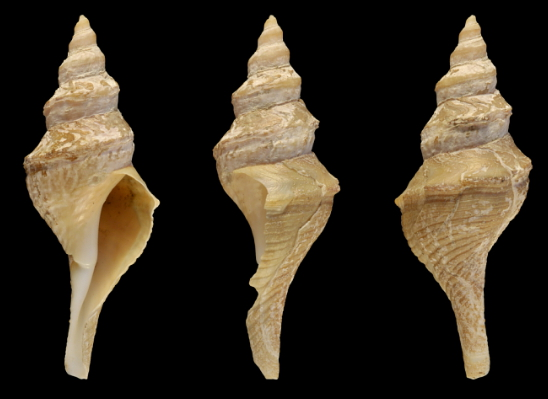
- Aforia circinata

Scientific classification
- Kingdom: Animalia
- Phylum: Mollusca
- Class: Gastropoda
- Subclass: Caenogastropoda
- Order: Neogastropoda
- Superfamily: Conoidea
- Family: Cochlespiridae
- Genus: Aforia; Dall, 1889

Type species
- Pleurotoma circinata Dall, 1873
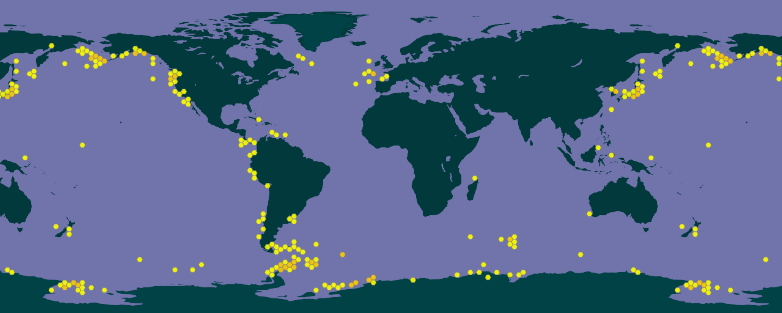

Synonyms
- Aforia (Abyssaforia) Sysoev & Kantor, 1987; Aforia (Aforia) Dall, 1889; Aforia (Dallaforia) Sysoev & Kantor, 1987; Danilacarina Bozzetti, 1997; Irenosyrinx Dall, 1908; Mangilia (Aforia) Dall, 1889 (original rank); Steiraxis Dall, 1896

= Aforia =

Genus of gastropods

Aforia is a genus of sea snails, marine gastropod mollusks in the family Cochlespiridae.

== Description ==
The shell resembles Irenosyrinx, but with stronger sculpture with narrow, low ribs and with a paucispiral, elongate operculum, bearing such a relation to the normal species of Turris as Mohnia bears to Chrysodomus. The nucleus is terminal.

Gastropods of this genus are among the largest members of the family Cochlespiridae in the Pacific Ocean, with adult shell sizes reaching up to 92 mm.

== Distribution ==
Species of this genus inhabit the Pacific Ocean, the southwestern Atlantic Ocean and the southeastern Indian Ocean; also in the cold waters off Patagonia, Tierra del Fuego, the Falkland Islands and the South Shetlands.

== Habitat ==
These species are predominantly found in sublittoral and relatively deep waters. However, detailed descriptions of the specific composition of Aforia in bathyal and abyssal environments are sparse. There is limited information on the distribution of these species, and data on their anatomy are almost nonexistent.

== Species ==
Species within the genus Aforia include:

- Aforia abyssalis Sysoev & Kantor, 1987
- † Aforia canalomos (Stilwell & Zinsmeister, 1992)
- Aforia circinata (Dall, 1873)
- Aforia crebristriata (Dall, 1908)
- Aforia goniodes (Watson, 1881)
- Aforia goodei (Dall, 1890)
- Aforia hedleyi (Dell, 1990)
- Aforia hypomela (Dall, 1889)
- Aforia indomaris Sysoev & Kantor, 1988
- Aforia inoperculata Sysoev & Kantor, 1988
- Aforia kincaidi (Dall, 1919)
- Aforia kupriyanovi Sysoev & Kantor, 1987
- Aforia magnifica (Strebel, 1908)
- Aforia moskalevi Sysoev & Kantor, 1987
- Aforia multispiralis Dell, 1990
- Aforia obesa Pastorino & Sánchez, 2016
- Aforia persimilis (Dall, 1890)
- Aforia serranoi Gofas, Kantor & Luque, 2014
- Aforia staminea (Watson, 1881)
- Aforia tasmanica Sysoev & Kantor, 1988
- Aforia trilix (Watson, 1881)
- Aforia watsoni Kantor, Harasewych & Puillandre, 2016 (interim unpublished)

Extinct species from the Oligocene in Northern America

- † Aforia addicotti Javidpour, 1973
- † Aforia campbelli Durham 1944
- † Aforia dallamensis (Weaver, 1916)
- † Aforia ecuadoriana Olsson 1964 (Pliocene of Ecuador)
- † Aforia tricarinata Addicott, 1966
- † Aforia wardi (Tegland, 1933)

Species brought into synonymy

- Aforia aulaca (Dall, 1896): synonym of Steiraxis aulaca (Dall, 1896)
- Aforia chosenensis Bartsch, 1945: synonym of Aforia circinata (Dall, 1873)
- Aforia diomedea Bartsch, 1945: synonym of Aforia circinata (Dall, 1873)
- Aforia gonoides (Watson, 1881 : synonym of Aforia goniodes (Watson, 1881)
- Aforia hondoana (Dall, 1925): synonym of Aforia circinata (Dall, 1873)
- Aforia insignis (Jeffreys, 1883): synonym of Aforia circinata (Dall, 1873)
- Aforia japonica Bartsch, 1945: synonym of Aforia circinata (Dall, 1873)
- Aforia lepta (Watson, 1881): synonym of Aforia watsoni Kantor, Harasewych & Puillandre, 2016
- Aforia okhotskensis Bartsch, 1945: synonym of Aforia circinata (Dall, 1873)
- Aforia sakhalinensis Bartsch, 1945: synonym of Aforia circinata (Dall, 1873)
