= Comispira mai =

Scientific classification
- Kingdom: Animalia
- Phylum: Mollusca
- Class: Gastropoda
- Subclass: Caenogastropoda
- Order: Neogastropoda
- Superfamily: Conoidea
- Family: Cochlespiridae
- Genus: Comispira
- Species: C. mai

Binomial name
- Comispira mai (B.-Q. Li & X.-Z. Li, 2008)

Species of gastropod

Comispira mai is a species of sea snail, a marine gastropod mollusk in the family Cochlespiridae.

== Distribution ==
This species occurs in the South China Sea
