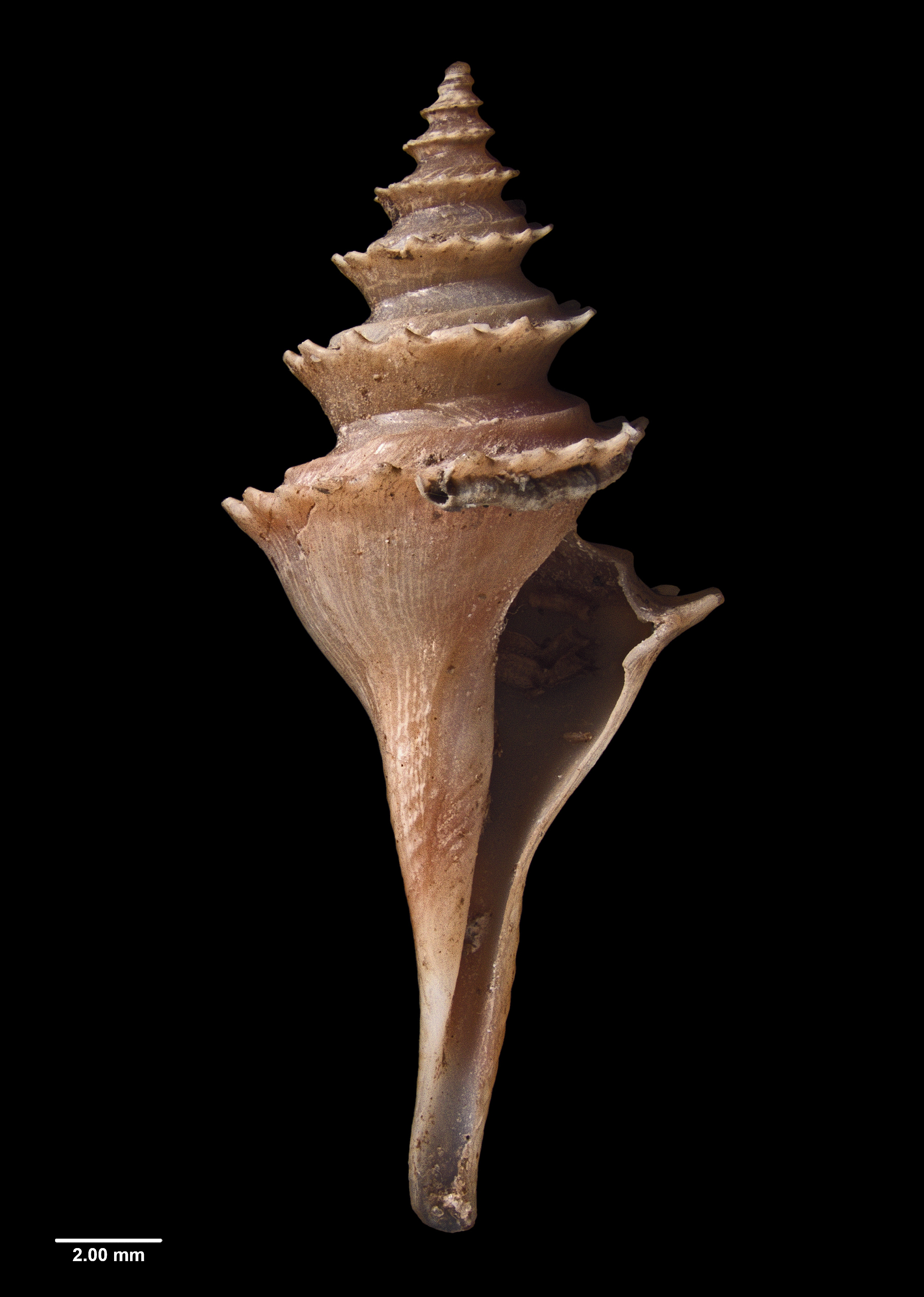

Scientific classification
- Kingdom: Animalia
- Phylum: Mollusca
- Class: Gastropoda
- Subclass: Caenogastropoda
- Order: Neogastropoda
- Superfamily: Conoidea
- Family: Cochlespiridae
- Genus: Cochlespira
- Species: C. beuteli

Binomial name
- Cochlespira beuteli Powell, 1969

= Cochlespira beuteli =

Species of gastropod

Cochlespira beuteli is a species of sea snail, a marine gastropod mollusk in the family Cochlespiridae.

== Description ==
The shell grows to a length of 23 mm. The Snail has an elongated and spiral shell, which can vary in color and pattern depending on environmental factors. The shell typically features several whorls, with a prominent siphonal canal at the apex.

== Distribution ==
This species is distributed from the Gulf of Carpentaria to Queensland, Australia
