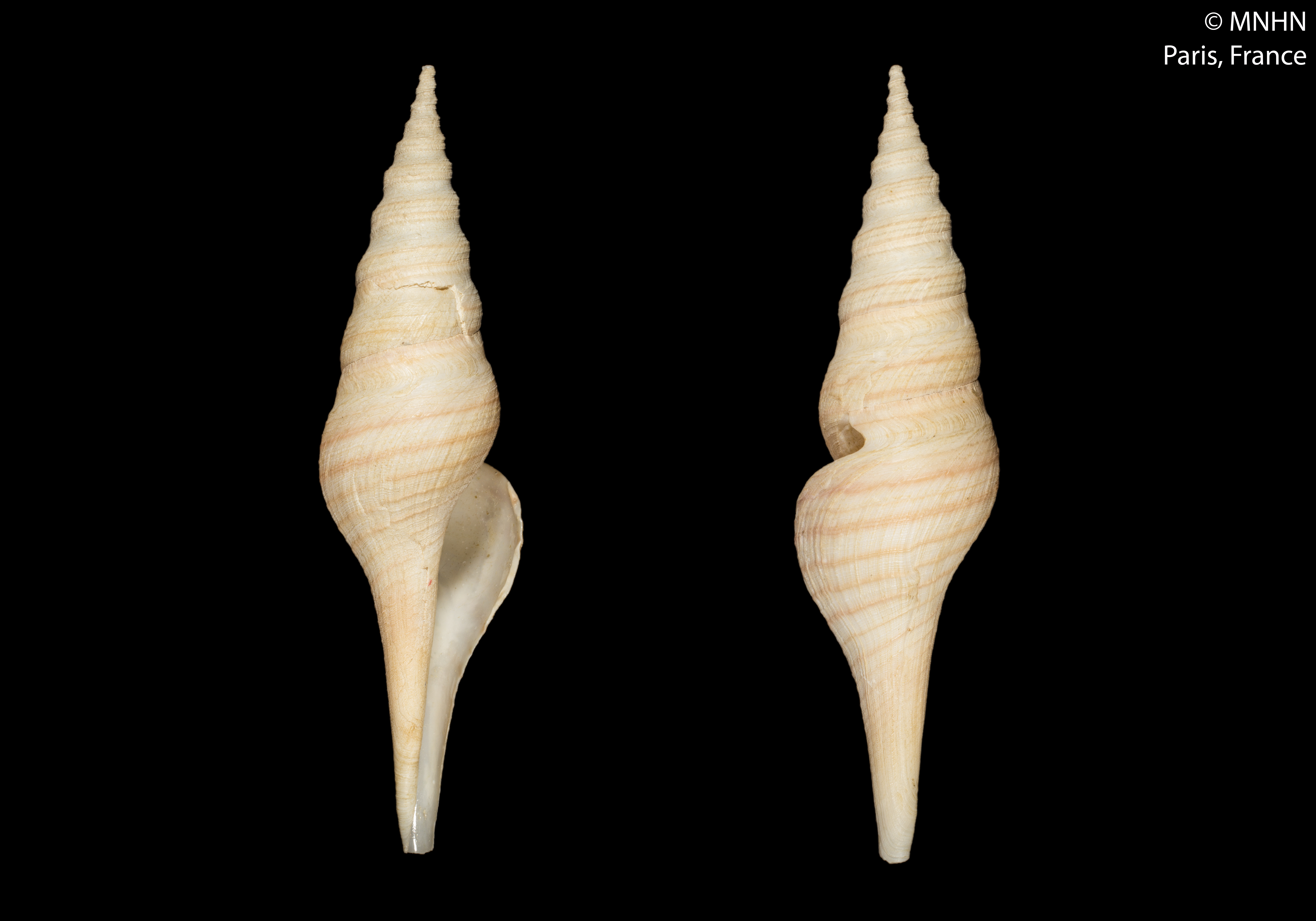

Scientific classification
- Kingdom: Animalia
- Phylum: Mollusca
- Class: Gastropoda
- Subclass: Caenogastropoda
- Order: Neogastropoda
- Superfamily: Conoidea
- Family: Cochlespiridae
- Genus: Nihonia
- Species: N. maxima

Binomial name
- Nihonia maxima Sysoev, 1997

= Nihonia maxima =

Species of gastropod

Nihonia maxima is a species of sea snail, a marine gastropod mollusk in the family Cochlespiridae.

== Description ==
The length of the shell attains 128 mm.

== Distribution ==
This species occurs in the Pacific Ocean off Eastern Indonesia.
