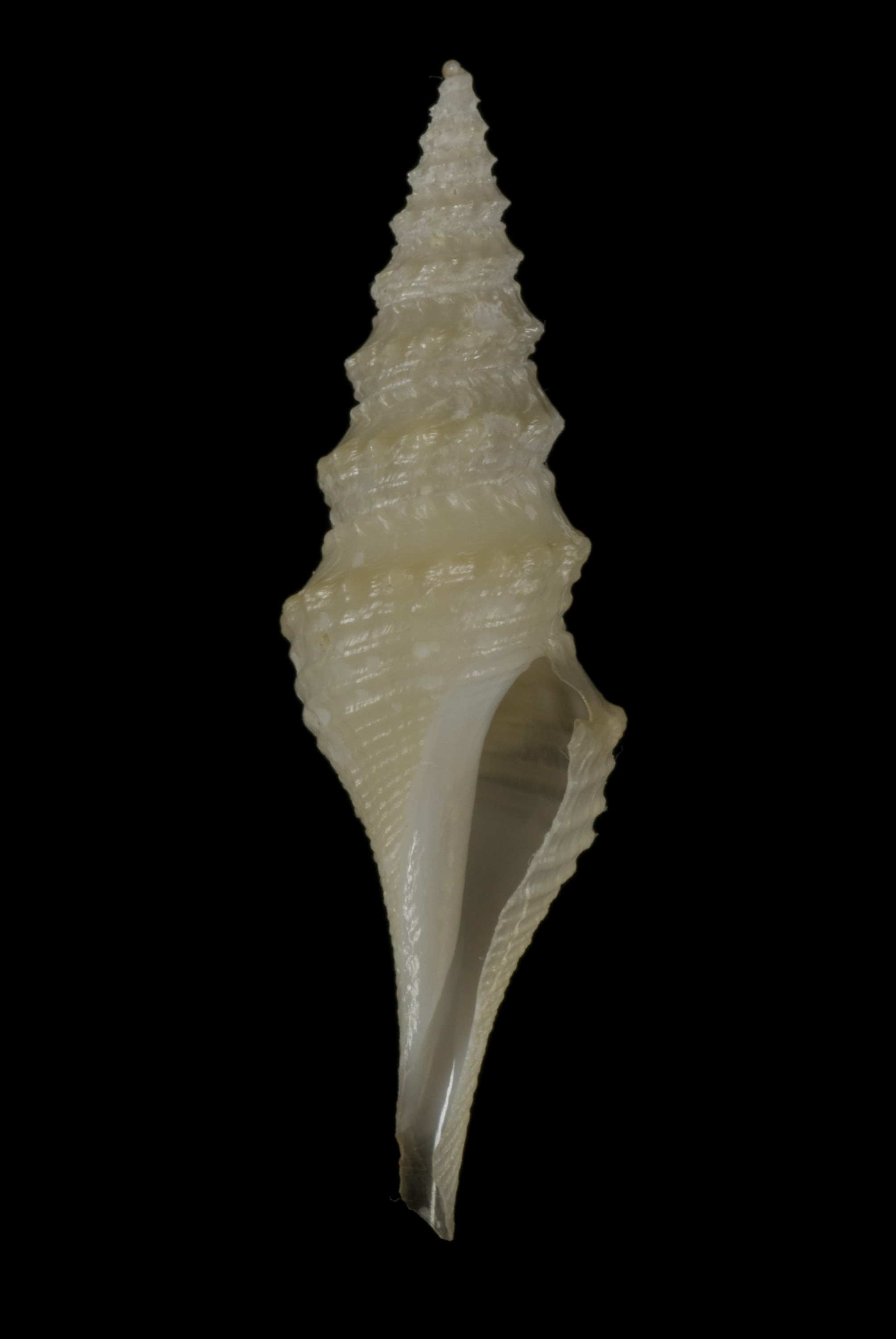
- Shell of Comispira compta (holotype at MNHN, Paris)

Scientific classification
- Kingdom: Animalia
- Phylum: Mollusca
- Class: Gastropoda
- Subclass: Caenogastropoda
- Order: Neogastropoda
- Superfamily: Conoidea
- Family: Cochlespiridae
- Genus: Comispira; Kantor, Fedosov & Puillandre, 2018

Type species
- Leucosyrinx mai B.-Q. Li & X.-Z. Li, 2008

Species
- See text

= Comispira =

Genus of gastropods

Comispira is a genus of sea snails, marine gastropod mollusks in the family Cochlespiridae.

== General characteristics ==
Species of this genus resemble Sibogasyrinx in the presence of the subsutural row of nodules, but differ in usually more pronounced spiral sculpture on the shell base, of broadly-spaced and rather strong spiral cords.

== Species ==
- Comispira candida Kantor, Hallan & Criscione, 2022
- Comispira compta Kantor, Fedosov & Puillandre, 2018
- Comispira erica (Thiele, 1925)
- Comispira exstructa (E. von Martens, 1904)
- Comispira mai (B.-Q. Li & X.-Z. Li, 2008)
- Comispira obtusigemmata (Schepman, 1913)
- Comispira saudesae (Cossigniani, 2018)
- Comispira subsuturalis (E. von Martens, 1901)
