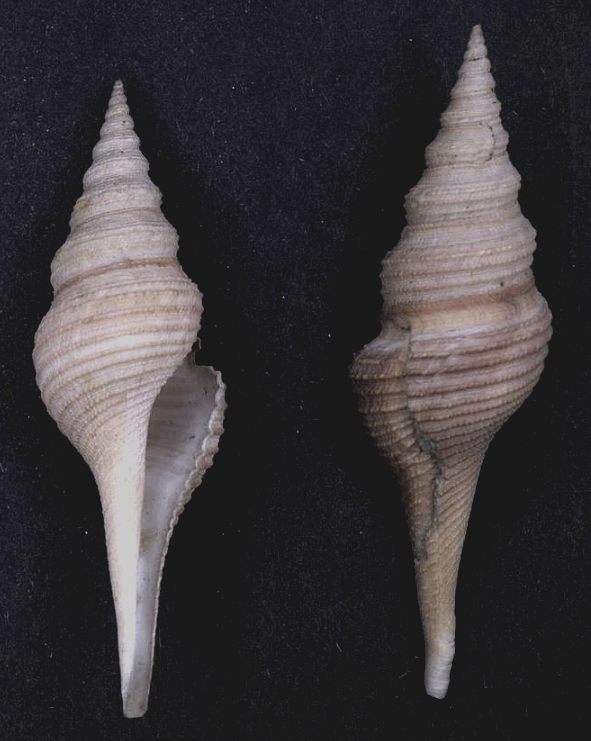
- Two views of a shell of Nihonia australis

Scientific classification
- Kingdom: Animalia
- Phylum: Mollusca
- Class: Gastropoda
- Subclass: Caenogastropoda
- Order: Neogastropoda
- Superfamily: Conoidea
- Family: Cochlespiridae
- Genus: Nihonia
- Species: N. australis

Binomial name
- Nihonia australis (Roissy, 1805)

Synonyms
- Clavatula australis Schepman, 1920; Murex javanus var. Dillwyn (non Linnaeus), 1817; Orthosurcula australis (Roissy, 1805); Pleurotoma (Surcula) australis Roissy, 1805; Pleurotoma turris Valenciennes, A. in Petit-Thouars, M.A. du, 1846; Surcula australis (Roissy, 1805); Turricula (Orthosurcula) australis (Roissy, 1805)

= Nihonia australis =

Species of gastropod

Nihonia australis, commonly named the Australian turrid, is a species of sea snail, a marine gastropod mollusk in the family Cochlespiridae.

The name Nihonia australis has often been attributed to Gmelin (1791:3542), as a result of a confusion between Murex australis Gmelin, 1791 [= Pelicaria vermis (Martyn, 1784)] and Pleurotoma australis Roissy, 1805 [= Nihonia australis]

== Description ==
The size of an adult shell varies between 70 mm and 95 mm. The elongate-fusiform shell is yellowish white, encircled by raised, corded orange-brown ribs, with several intermediate striae. The blunt protoconch contains 1½ -2 whorls. The teleoconch contains 9½ -10 whorls. The outer lip is broadly rounded above into the rather shallow sinus. The long, straight siphonal canal is unnotched.

== Distribution ==
This marine species occurs off Japan and Australia.
