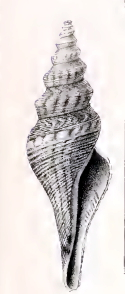
- Nihonia circumstricta shell

Scientific classification
- Kingdom: Animalia
- Phylum: Mollusca
- Class: Gastropoda
- Subclass: Caenogastropoda
- Order: Neogastropoda
- Superfamily: Conoidea
- Family: Cochlespiridae
- Genus: Nihonia; McNeil, 1961

Type species
- † Nihonia shimajiriensis MacNeil, 1960

= Nihonia =

Genus of gastropods

Nihonia is a genus of sea snails, marine gastropod mollusks in the family Cochlespiridae.

== Species ==
Species within the genus Nihonia include:

- Nihonia australis (Roissy, 1805)
- Nihonia circumstricta (Martens, 1901)
- Nihonia maxima Sysoev, 1997
- Nihonia mirabilis (Sowerby III, 1914)

Extinct species

- † Nihonia birmanica (Vredenburg, 1921)
- † Nihonia pervirgo (Yokoyaina, 1928)
- † Nihonia shimajiriensis MacNeil, 1960. Type species from the Miocene of Okinawa.
- † Nihonia santosi Sbuto, 1969
- † Nihonia soyomaruae (Otuka, 1959)
- † Nihonia sucabumiana (K. Martin, 1895)
