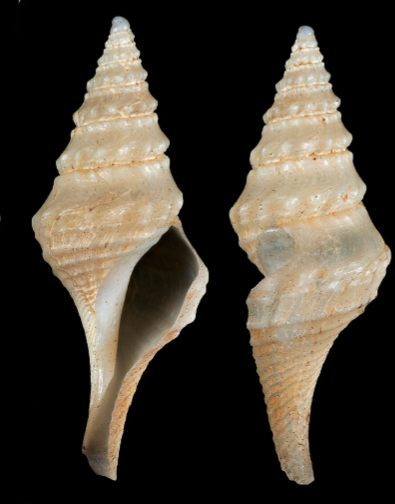
- Shell of Comispira subsuturalis (syntype at Museum für Naturkunde, Berlin)

Scientific classification
- Kingdom: Animalia
- Phylum: Mollusca
- Class: Gastropoda
- Subclass: Caenogastropoda
- Order: Neogastropoda
- Superfamily: Conoidea
- Family: Cochlespiridae
- Genus: Comispira
- Species: C. subsuturalis

Binomial name
- Comispira subsuturalis (von Martens, 1901)

Synonyms
- Brachytoma subsuturalis (E. von Martens, 1901) superseded combination; Comitas subsuturalis (E. von Martens, 1901) superseded combination; Pleurotoma (Brachytoma) subsuturalis E. von Martens, 1901 superseded combination; Pleurotoma subsuturalis Martens, 1901 (original combination)

= Comispira subsuturalis =

Species of gastropod

Comispira subsuturalis is a species of sea snail, a marine gastropod mollusk in the family Cochlespiridae.

== Description ==
The shell measures 22 mm in length and 9 mm in diameter; the aperture measures 13 mm in length including the canal, 6 mm excluding the canal, and 4 mm in width.

(Original description in Latin) The shell is fusiform-biconical, with the middle part tuberculate and angled, and with a single row of small nodules below the suture. It is thin and white. The shell has nine whorls: the first two are smooth and subglobose, and the following whorls increase regularly in size. The suture is impressed, and the tuberculate angle lies closer to the lower suture. The body whorl is sculptured below with spiral lirae and then narrows strongly toward the base.

The aperture extends higher than the spire. The outer lip is thin and broadly, arcuately notched above. The siphonal canal is long, slightly recurved, and broadly open. The columellar margin is slightly concave, smooth, glossy, and worn by abrasion.

== Remarks ==
Powell (1966) illustrated the radula of a specimen from the John Murray expedition, which features a large central formation typical of Cochlespiridae, but absent in Comitas and Leucosyrinx. The shell of this species has a row of subsutural nodules, a feature not found in any species of Leucosyrinx or Comitas, but present in all species of Sibogasyrinx and Comispira. The shell shape and sculpture closely resemble those of Comispira, leading to a transfer of the species to that genus.

== Distribution ==
This marine species occurs off East Africa and Zanzibar; depth: 1134 m.

This species is very broadly distributed, ranging from East Africa through the Indian Ocean to Japan, at depths of 494–1789 meters. This exceptionally wide distribution and high variability (Sysoev 1996) may indicate that we are dealing with a complex of species.
