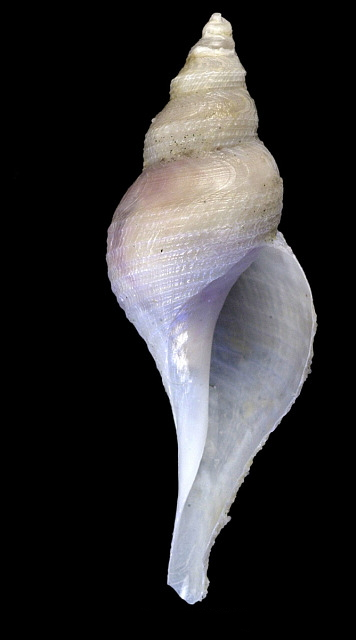
- Shell of Aforia magnifica (specimen at the Smithsonian Institution)

Scientific classification
- Kingdom: Animalia
- Phylum: Mollusca
- Class: Gastropoda
- Subclass: Caenogastropoda
- Order: Neogastropoda
- Superfamily: Conoidea
- Family: Cochlespiridae
- Genus: Aforia
- Species: A. magnifica

Binomial name
- Aforia magnifica (Strebel, 1908)
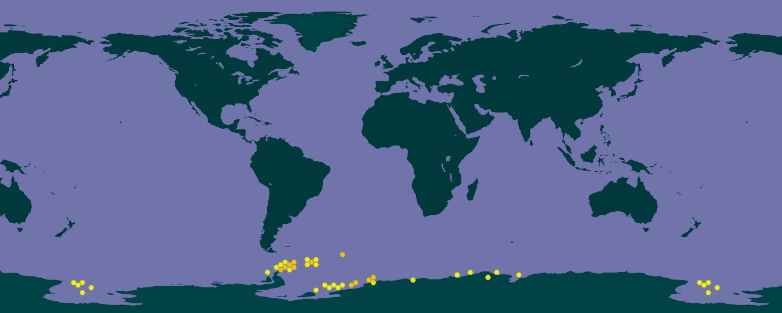

Synonyms
- Danilacarina elenae Bozzetti, 1997; Surcula magnifica Strebel, 1908

= Aforia magnifica =

Species of gastropod

Aforia magnifica is a species of sea snail, a marine gastropod mollusk in the family Cochlespiridae.

== Description ==
The size of an adult shell varies between 40 mm and 150 mm. The radula has a large-based unicuspid central tooth.

== Distribution ==
This species is found off the South Sandwich Islands, the South Orkneys, South Shetland, the Antarctic Peninsula and the Weddell Sea, Antarctica
