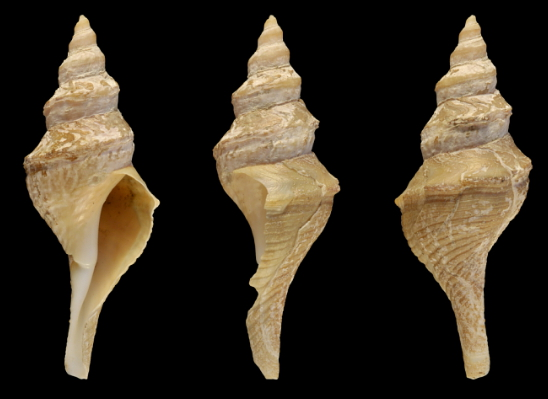
- Shell of Aforia circinata (holotype at the Smithsonian Institution)

Scientific classification
- Kingdom: Animalia
- Phylum: Mollusca
- Class: Gastropoda
- Subclass: Caenogastropoda
- Order: Neogastropoda
- Superfamily: Conoidea
- Family: Cochlespiridae
- Genus: Aforia
- Species: A. circinata

Binomial name
- Aforia circinata (Dall, 1873)
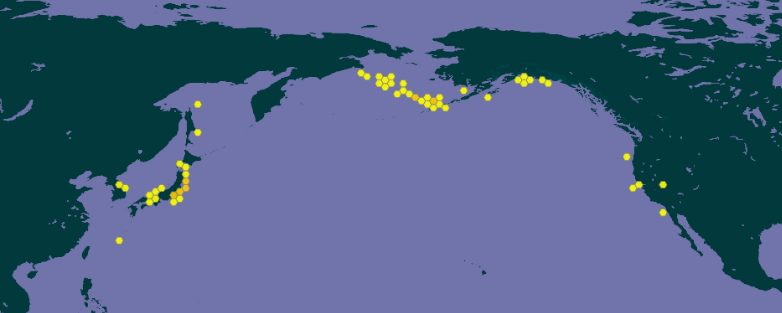

Synonyms
- Aforia chosenensis Bartsch, 1945; Aforia diomedea Bartsch, P., 1945; Aforia hondoana (Dall, 1925); Aforia insignis (Jeffreys, 1883); Aforia japonica Bartsch, 1945; Aforia okhotskensis Bartsch, P., 1945; Aforia sakhalinensis Bartsch, P., 1945; Daphnella circinata Dall, 1873; Leucosyrinx circinata (Dall, 1873) ·; Mangilia (Aforia) circinata (Dall, 1873); Pleurotoma circinata Dall, 1873 (original combination); Pleurotoma insignis Jeffreys, 1883; Surcula hondoana Dall, W.H., 1925; Turricula hondoana Dall, 1925; Turricula japonica Dall, 1925; Turris (Aforia) circinata Dall, 1873

= Aforia circinata =

Species of gastropod

Aforia circinata, common name the ridged turrid, is a species of sea snail, a marine gastropod mollusk in the family Cochlespiridae.

== Description ==
The shell grows to a length of 75 mm.

The slender, elongated shell is coated with a brownish epidermis. It features six evenly rounded whorls, characterized by a sharp carina. Above the carina, the shell is smooth, while below it, the surface is grooved with wider interspaces. The deep anal sinus is situated approximately one-third of the way from the carina to the suture.

(Original description) The shell is slender and elongated, covered with a brownish epidermis. It features six whorls with a single, sharp, narrow carina located around the middle of the upper whorls. This carina does not disrupt the even roundness of the whorls but appears as if it were placed on the equator of the whorl after its formation. The posterior surface of the carina and the area behind it are nearly smooth, marked only by microscopic revolving striae and deeply notched growth lines. In contrast, the anterior surface of the carina and whorls is adorned with sharp, revolving grooves and wider interspaces, numbering about twelve on the body whorl between the posterior edge of the aperture and the carina. The deep notch is positioned about one-third of the way from the carina to the suture. The aperture and siphonal canal are long and narrow, with the outer lip effuse before the carina. The nucleus is white.

== Distribution ==
This marine species occurs in the Bering Sea and in cold waters from Alaska, United States to Japan
