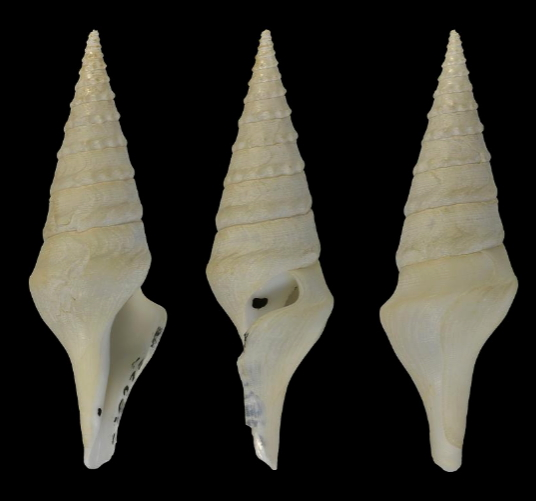
- Shell of Leucosyrinx archibenthalis (holotype at the Smithsonian Institution)

Scientific classification
- Kingdom: Animalia
- Phylum: Mollusca
- Class: Gastropoda
- Subclass: Caenogastropoda
- Order: Neogastropoda
- Superfamily: Conoidea
- Family: Pseudomelatomidae
- Genus: Leucosyrinx
- Species: L. archibenthalis

Binomial name
- Leucosyrinx archibenthalis Powell, 1969

Synonyms
- Leucosyrinx (Sibogasyrinx) archibenthalis Powell, 1969; Sibogasyrinx archibenthalis (A. W. B. Powell, 1969) superseded combination

= Leucosyrinx archibenthalis =

Species of gastropod

Leucosyrinx archibenthalis is a species of sea snail, a marine gastropod mollusc in the family Pseudomelatomidae.

== Description ==
The shell is medium-sized, reaching nearly 45 mm in length. It is rather solid, fusiform to nearly biconical, with a high spire and a coloration ranging from greyish to light brownish. The protoconch is small, glossy, and paucispiral, consisting of about 1.75 whorls. The teleoconch whorls are very weakly angular at the shoulder and bear a nearly flat subsutural ramp. The suture is impressed.

Distinct oblique axial folds are present on the shoulder, with 16–18 folds on the penultimate whorl. On the upper whorls, these folds reach the lower suture, and in some shells they may be reduced to rounded knobs situated just above the lower suture. The folds gradually weaken on the later part of the penultimate whorl and are absent from the body whorl in larger specimens.

The spiral sculpture is well developed and consists of narrow, low, rounded, and slightly wavy cords of similar width that are well pronounced over the entire shell. The intervals between the cords are narrower than the cords themselves. On the subsutural ramp, the cords are broader and less sinuous than those below the shoulder.

The shell base is weakly to moderately convex and gradually passes into a medium-long, straight canal. The aperture is narrow and elongate-oval and is poorly differentiated from the siphonal canal. A deep, subsutural, broadly arcuate anal sinus extends across the subsutural ramp and is confluent with the large forward extension of the outer lip.

The radula comprises around 35 rows of teeth, of which 15 are nascent. The marginal teeth are duplex and measure approximately 220 µm in length, corresponding to 2.0% of the aperture length excluding the canal. The major limb is moderately broad, lanceolate in dorsal view, and weakly curved. The accessory limb is less than half as broad as the major limb, maintains the same width along its entire length, measures about 0.8 of the total tooth length, and is inserted into a distinct, deep socket on the dorsal side of the major limb.

== Distribution ==
This marine species occurs off the Philippines, Papua New Guinea and in the Bismarck Sea at depths between 431 m and 924 m.
