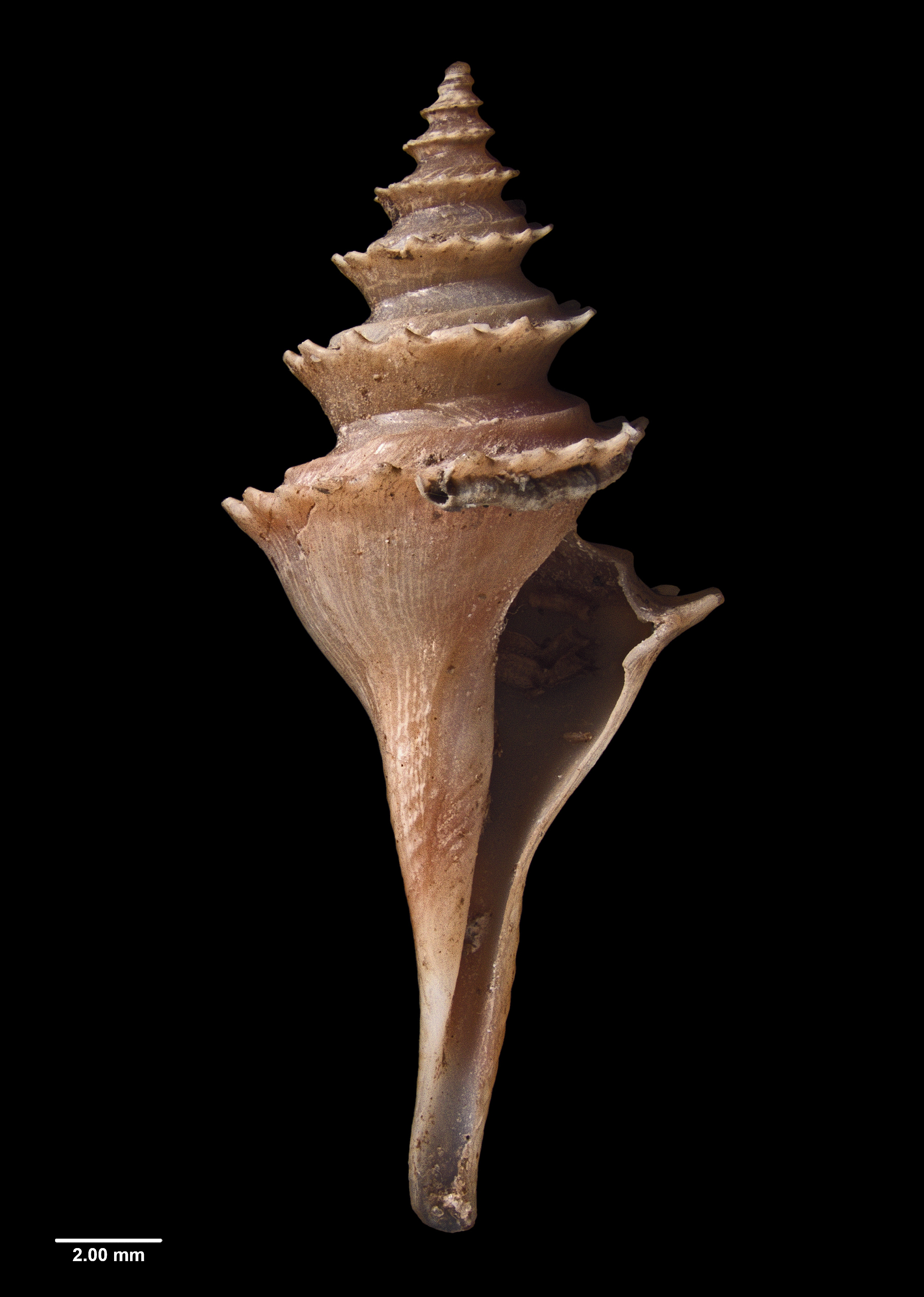
- Shell of Cochlespira beuteli

Scientific classification
- Kingdom: Animalia
- Phylum: Mollusca
- Class: Gastropoda
- Subclass: Caenogastropoda
- Order: Neogastropoda
- Superfamily: Conoidea
- Family: Cochlespiridae; A. W. B. Powell, 1942

Type genus
- Cochlespira Conrad, 1865

Genera
- See text

Synonyms
- Cochlespirinae A. W. B. Powell, 1942

= Cochlespiridae =

Family of gastropods

Cochlespiridae is a taxonomic family of predatory sea snails, marine gastropod mollusks in the superfamily Conoidea.

== General characteristics ==
This family consists of moderately sized shells, usually between 20–30 mm (0.79–1.18 in), but in Nihonia maxima the length of shell can reach 128 mm (5.0 in). The shell of Aforia magnifica even reaches 150 mm (5.9 in). The shell is turriculated and fusiform with a long, sharp spire. Axial sculpture is absent or feebly developed. The aperture is ovate. The columellar margin is smoot. The outer lip has a narrow profound anal sinus on the subsutural ramp. The open siphonal canal is long, narrow, and straight. The operculum has a terminal nucleus.

The foot of the animal is truncated anteriorly, obtuse posteriorly. The eyes are located externally near the base of cylindrical tentacles. The radula formula is 1-0-R-0-1. The duplex radular teeth are nonhypodermic.

Powell originally defined the taxon as having a radula formula 1+0+1+0+1, having a variable operculum, a rounded, broad sinus on the shoulder (ranging from shallow to deep), by having a very large central tooth, and a thin shell with sharply angles periphery, that live in deep water.

The clade has poor congruence between genetic relationships and characteristics of shells.

== Taxonomy ==
The family was first described by A.W.B. Powell in 1942 as Cochlespirinae, a subfamily of Turridae. Powell synonymised the subfamily with Turriculinae in 1966, later reinstating the subfamily in 1969, arguing the name Turriculinae could not be used as a junior homonym, an interpretation that was not supported by the International Code of Zoological Nomenclature. In 1993, the subfamily was restored after the genus Turricula was moved out of Turriculinae, meaning that a different name was required for the taxon.

In 2011, the subfamily was raised to family level based on phylogenetic analysis, as a clade that included the genera Cochlespira and Sibogasyrinx. Phylogenetic analysis suggests that Cochlespiridae is a basal group distinct from all other Conoidean lineages, or that Marshallenidae is a sister clade to Cochlespiridae.

== Paleontology ==
The oldest known fossils of Cochlespiridae date to the Paleocene, such as the genus Pseudocochlespira, which is found in strata dating to just after the Cretaceous–Paleogene boundary.

== Ecology ==
Members of this family are typically sand dwelling.

== Genera ==
Genera within the family Cochlespiridae include:

- Aforia Dall, 1889
- Apiotoma Cossmann, 1889
- Clavosurcula Schepman, 1913
- Cochlespira Conrad, 1865
- Comispira Kantor, Fedosov & Puillandre, 2018
- Nihonia McNeil, 1961
- † Praesurcula Garvie, 2013
- † Pseudocochlespira Schnetler, 2001
- Sibogasyrinx Powell, 1969

Genera brought into synonymy

- Ancistrosyrinx Dall, 1881: synonym of Cochlespira Conrad, 1865
- Coronasyrinx Powell, 1944: synonym of Cochlespira Conrad, 1865
- Danilacarina Bozzetti, 1997: synonym of Aforia Dall, 1889
- Irenosyrinx Dall, 1908: synonym of Aforia Dall, 1889
- Pagodasyrinx Shuto, 1969: synonym of Cochlespira Conrad, 1865
- Steiraxis Dall, 1896: synonym of Aforia Dall, 1889
- Tahusyrinx Powell, 1942 : synonym of Cochlespira Conrad, 1865

== Gallery ==
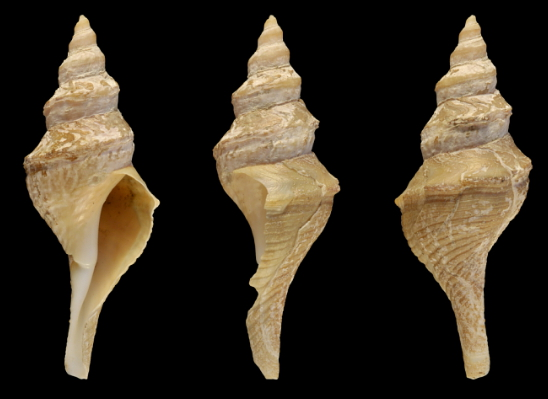
Aforia circinata

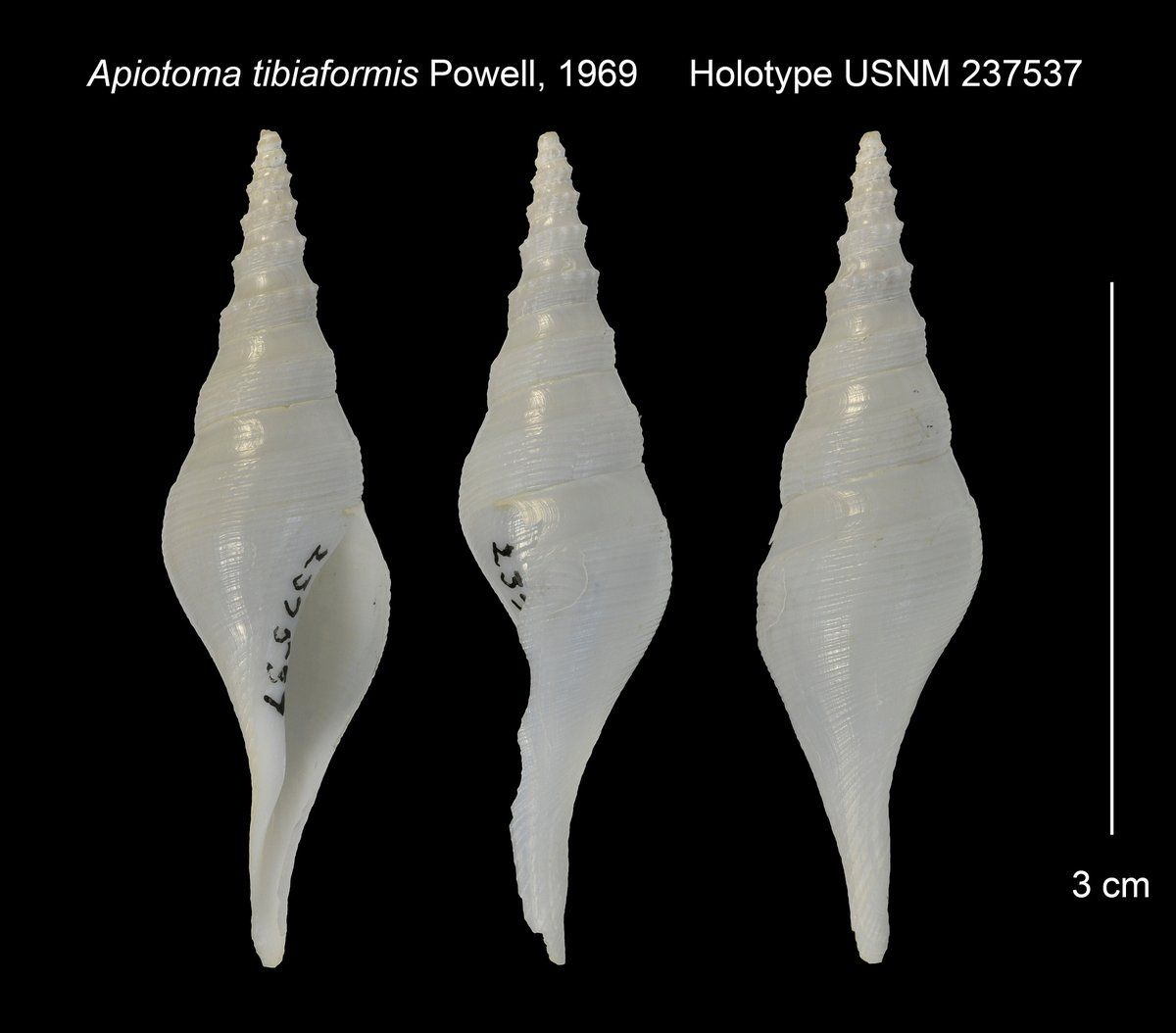
Apiotoma tibiaformis

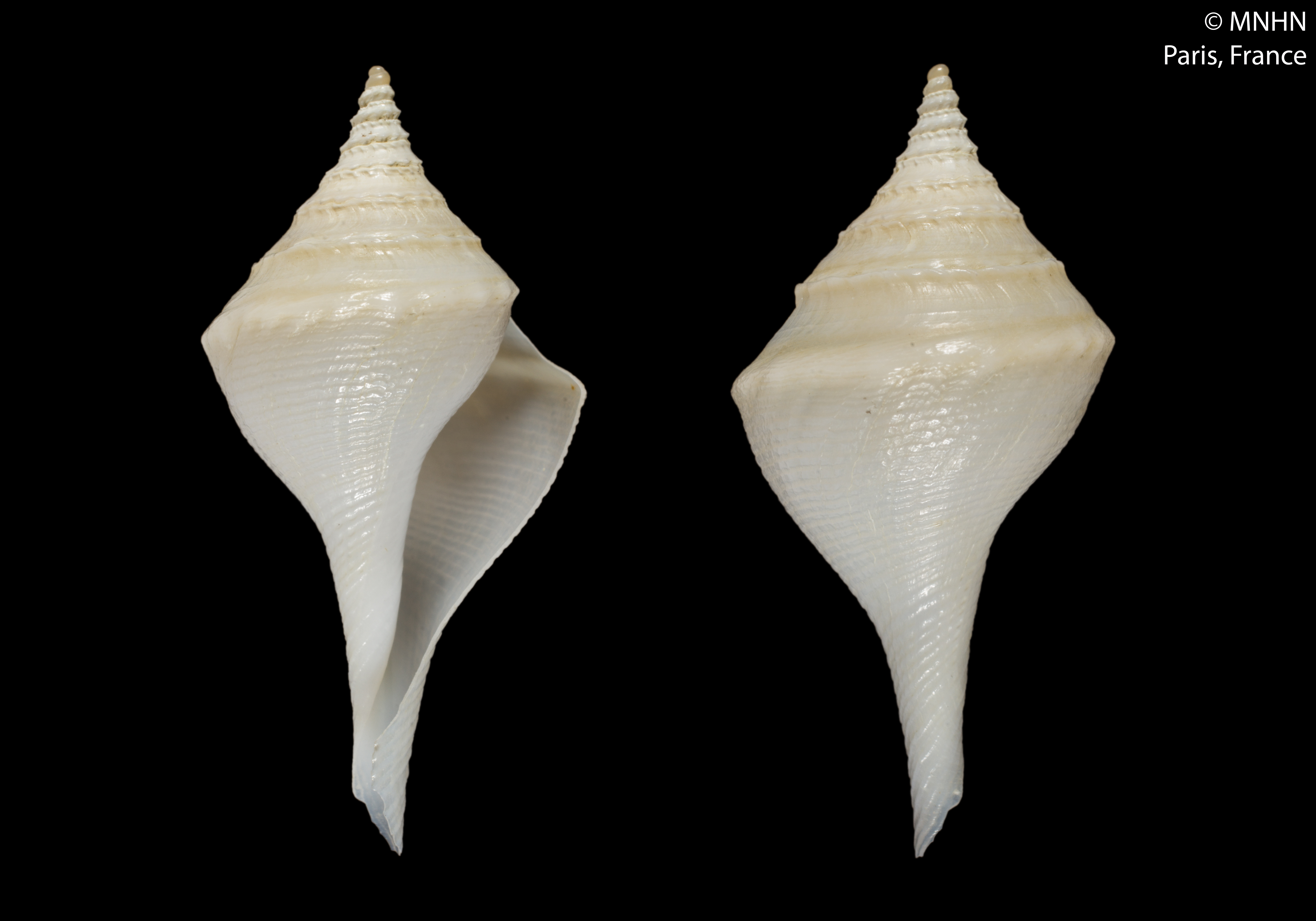
Clavosurcula schepmani

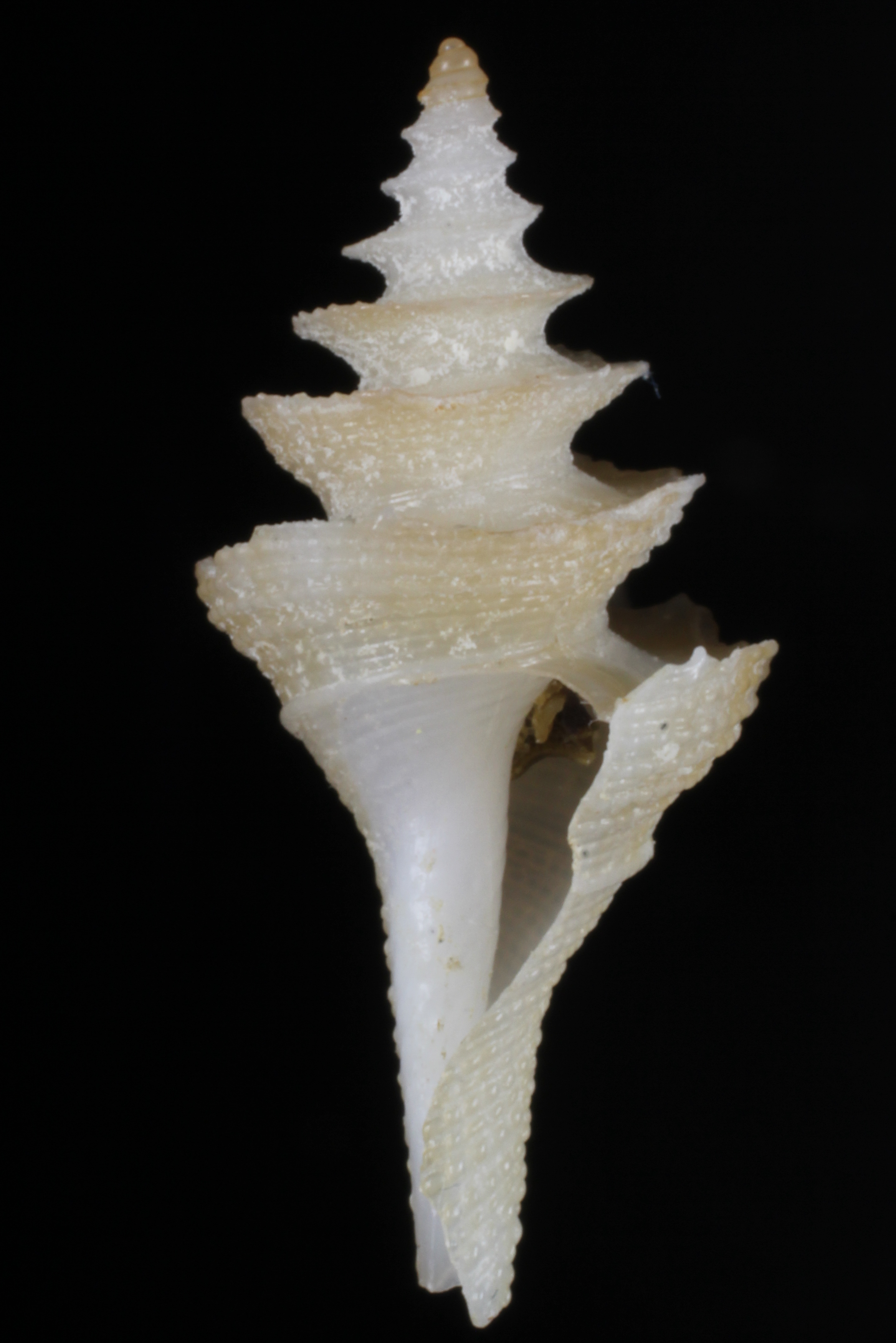
Cochlespira elegans

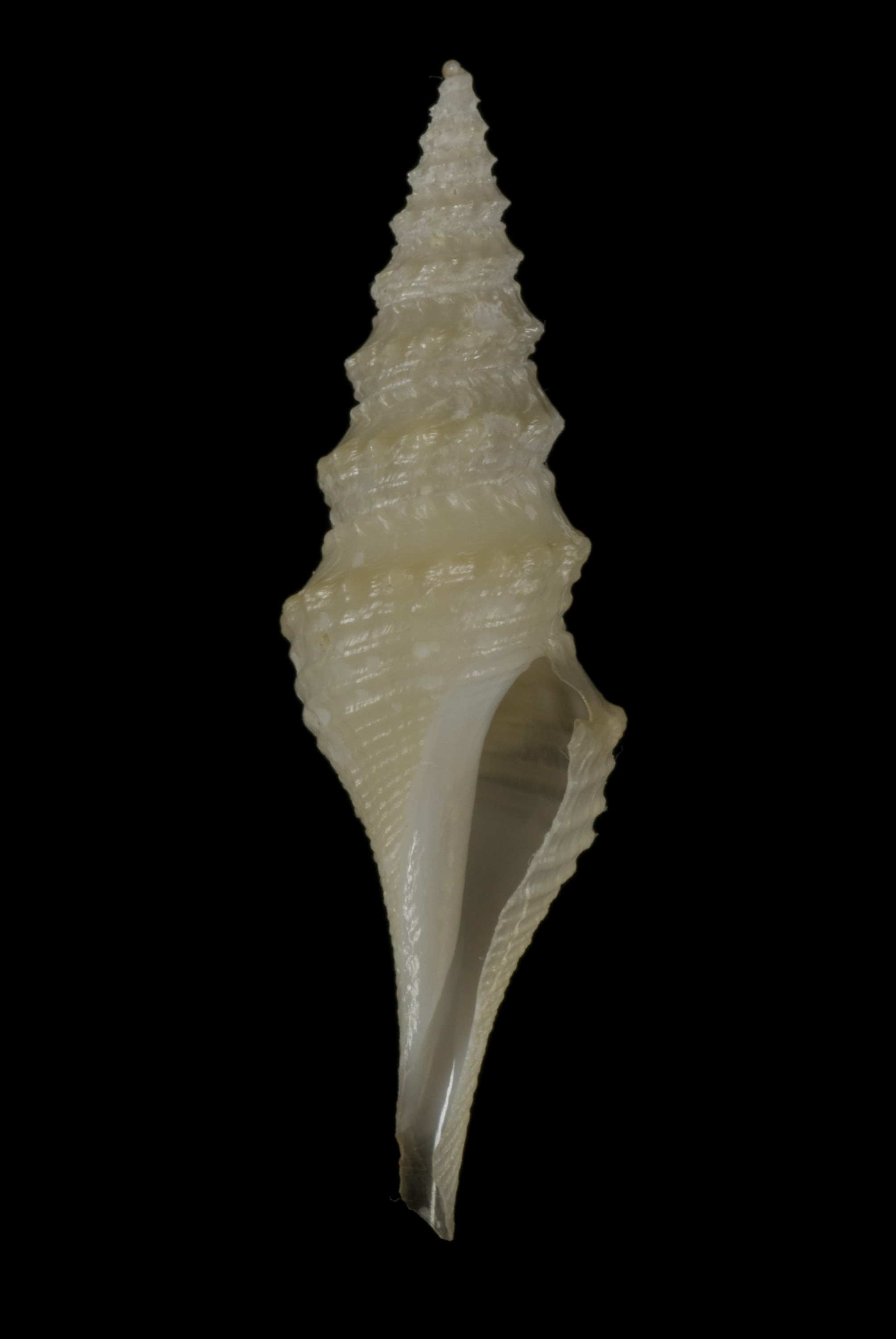
Comispira compta

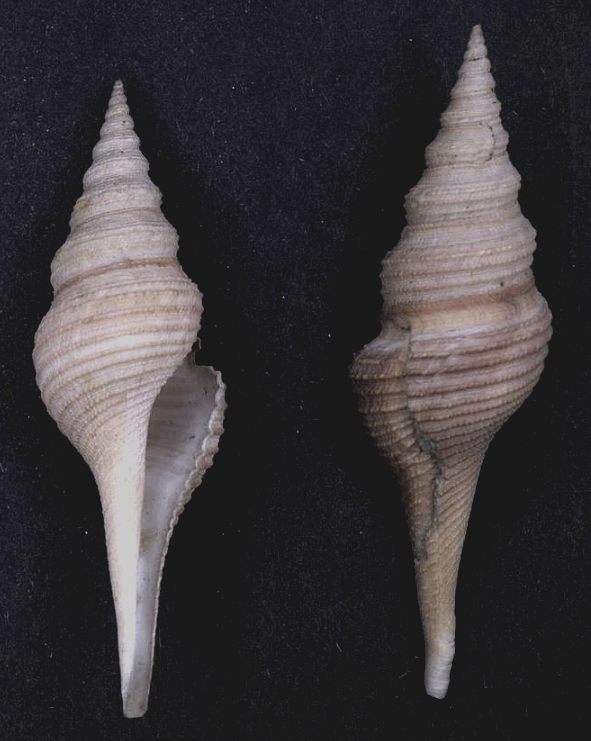
Nihonia australis

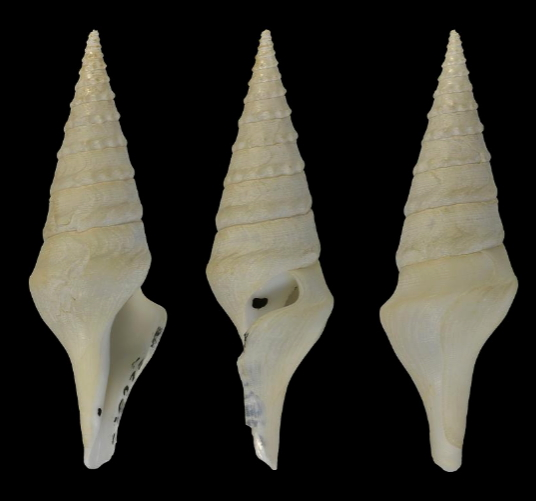
Sibogasyrinx archibenthalis
