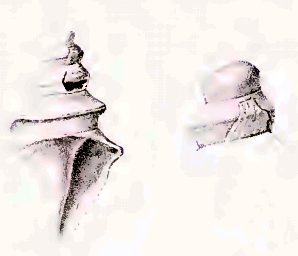
- Ancistrosyrinx clytotropis

Scientific classification
- Kingdom: Animalia
- Phylum: Mollusca
- Class: Gastropoda
- Subclass: Caenogastropoda
- Order: Neogastropoda
- Superfamily: Conoidea
- Family: Cochlespiridae
- Genus: Ancistrosyrinx; Dall, 1881

Type species
- Ancistrosyrinx elegans Dall, 1881

= Ancistrosyrinx =

Genus of gastropods

Ancistrosyrinx is a genus of sea snails, marine gastropod mollusks in the family Cochlespiridae.

== Species ==
Species within the genus Ancistrosyrinx include:

- Ancistrosyrinx clytotropis (Sykes, 1906)
- † Ancistrosyrinx perspirata Koenen, 1865
- † Ancistrosyrinx spirata Rouault, 1850
- † Ancistrosyrinx subterebralis Reillardi, 1847
- † Ancistrosyrinx terebralis Lamarck, 1804
  - † Ancistrosyrinx terebralis pulcherrima Edwards, 1861

Species brought into synonymy

- Ancistrosyrinx elegans Dall, 1881: synonym of Cochlespira elegans (Dall, 1881)
- Ancistrosyrinx kuroharai Kuroda, 1959 : synonym of Cochlespira kuroharai (Kuroda, 1959)
- Ancistrosyrinx orientis Melvill, 1904 : synonym of Thatcheriasyrinx orientis (Melvill, 1904)
- Ancistrosyrinx pulchella Schepman, 1913 : synonym of Cochlespira pulchella (Schepman, 1913)
- Ancistrosyrinx pulcherrissima Kira, 1955 : synonym of Cochlespira pulcherrissima (Kira, 1955)
