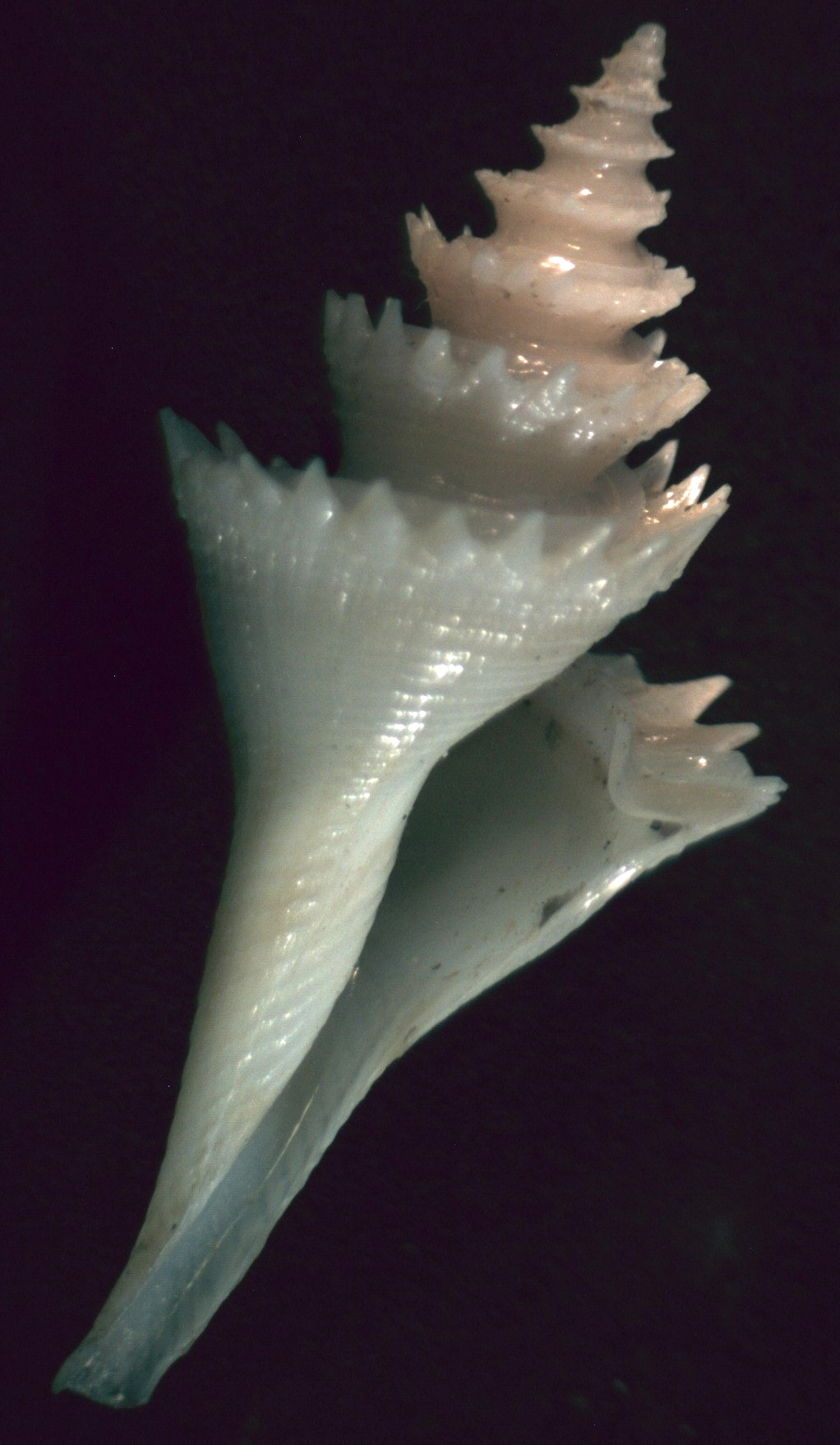
- Apertural view of a shell of Cochlespira radiata

Scientific classification
- Kingdom: Animalia
- Phylum: Mollusca
- Class: Gastropoda
- Subclass: Caenogastropoda
- Order: Neogastropoda
- Superfamily: Conoidea
- Family: Cochlespiridae
- Genus: Cochlespira; Conrad, 1865

Type species
- Pleurotoma cristata Conrad, T.A., 1847

Synonyms
- Coronasyrinx Powell, 1944; Pagodasyrinx Shuto, 1969; Surcula (Cochlespira); Tahusyrinx Powell, 1942

= Cochlespira =

Genus of gastropods

Cochlespira is a genus of sea snails, marine gastropod mollusks in the family Cochlespiridae.

== Description ==
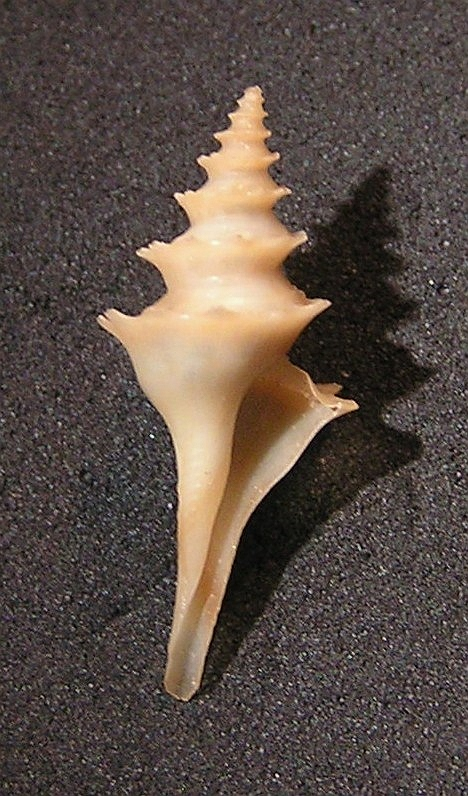
A shell of a Cochlespira cedonulli, found in Mexico.

The species in this genus are characterized by their elongated fusiform spire and a long siphonal canal. The whorls show on their edge spinose projections.

The shell is moderate in size, with a subacute, few whorled, glassy protoconch. It has an elongated slender, straight siphonal canal. The whorls are tabulated by a sharp recurved spinose or beaded keel, between which and the suture the surface is concave, nearly smooth. The anal sulcus is deep, narrow, the fasciole separated from the suture by a beaded ridge, the outer margin of the fasciole not elevated. Type † Pleurotoma cristata Conrad, 1848. Oligocene fossil.

This group is extremely close to Ancistrosyrinx Dall, 1881, the latter differing only by having the anal sulcus at the suture, with no intervening ridge, while the outer margin of the fasciole has an elevated lamella between which and the reflected keel at the shoulder there is an excavated channel. These differences hold good between the Oligocene and the recent forms, so far known, without exception. The recent forms have an operculum like that of Leucosyrinx.

== Distribution ==
Species from this genus occur in very deep water in the Indo-West Pacific and off Australia (Queensland).

== Species ==
Species within the genus Cochlespira include:

- †Cochlespira bastropensis G. D. Harris, 1937
- †Cochlespira bella Conrad, 1865
- Cochlespira beuteli A. W. B. Powell, 1969
- Cochlespira bevdeynzerae E. F. Garcia, 2010
- †Cochlespira brychiosinus (Stilwell & Zinsmeister, 1992)
- Cochlespira cavalier E. F. García, 2010
- Cochlespira cedonulli (Reeve, 1843)
- †Cochlespira columbaria (Aldrich, 1886)
- †Cochlespira cookei MacNeil, 1984
- †Cochlespira corneti (Koenen, 1872)
- Cochlespira crispulata (E. von Martens, 1901)
- †Cochlespira cristata (Conrad, 1847)
- Cochlespira elegans (Dall, 1881)
- Cochlespira elongata Simone, 1999
- †Cochlespira engonata Conrad, 1865
- †Cochlespira gyrata (F. E. Edwards, 1857)
- †Cochlespira kotakai H. Noda, 1988
- Cochlespira kuroharai (Kuroda, 1959)
- Cochlespira laurettamarrae E. F. García, 2010
- Cochlespira leeana E. F. García, 2010
- †Cochlespira maorum (P. Marshall & Murdoch, 1923)
- Cochlespira notomaris Simone & Tarasconi, 2022
- †Cochlespira osawanoensis (Tsuda, 1959)
- †Cochlespira protomediterranea Landau, Harzhauser, İslamoğlu & C. M. Silva, 2013
- Cochlespira pulchella (Schepman, 1913)
- Cochlespira pulcherrissima (Kira, 1959)
- Cochlespira radiata (Dall, 1889)
- †Cochlespira raffii Scarponi & Della Bella, 2004
- †Cochlespira semiplana (A. W. B. Powell, 1944)
- †Cochlespira serrata (Bellardi, 1877)
- Cochlespira simillima A. W. B. Powell, 1969
- †Cochlespira subserrata (O. Boettger, 1906)
- †Cochlespira subterebralis (Bellardi, 1847)
- †Cochlespira takabanarensis (MacNeil, 1961)
- †Cochlespira terebralis (Lamarck, 1804)
- Cochlespira travancorica (E. A. Smith, 1896)
- †Cochlespira venusta (A. W. B. Powell, 1944)
- Cochlespira zanzibarica Sysoev, 1996
