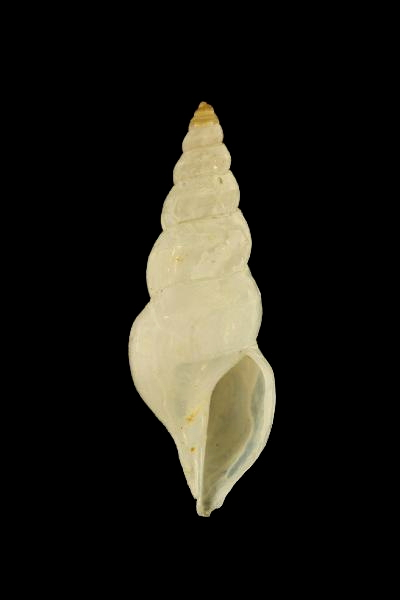
- Shell of Aliceia sp. (museum specimen in MNHN, Paris)

Scientific classification
- Kingdom: Animalia
- Phylum: Mollusca
- Class: Gastropoda
- Subclass: Caenogastropoda
- Order: Neogastropoda
- Superfamily: Conoidea
- Family: Raphitomidae
- Genus: Aliceia; Dautzenberg & Fischer, 1897

Type species
- Aliceia aenigmatica Dautzenberg & H. Fischer, 1897

Species
- See text

= Aliceia =

Genus of gastropods

Aliceia is a genus of sea snails, marine gastropod mollusks in the family Raphitomidae.

The taxonomic position of Aliceia is rather uncertain. It may as well belong to the family Turridae (resembling genus Lucerapex) or to the family Clathurellidae (resembling Pleurotomoides or Famelica). The species Thatcheriasyrinx sp. Kay, 1979 may also belong to Aliceia.

== Species ==
Species within the genus Aliceia include:

- Aliceia aenigmatica Dautzenberg & Fischer H., 1897
- Aliceia okutanii Sasaki & Warén, 2007
- Aliceia simplicissima (Thiele, 1925)
