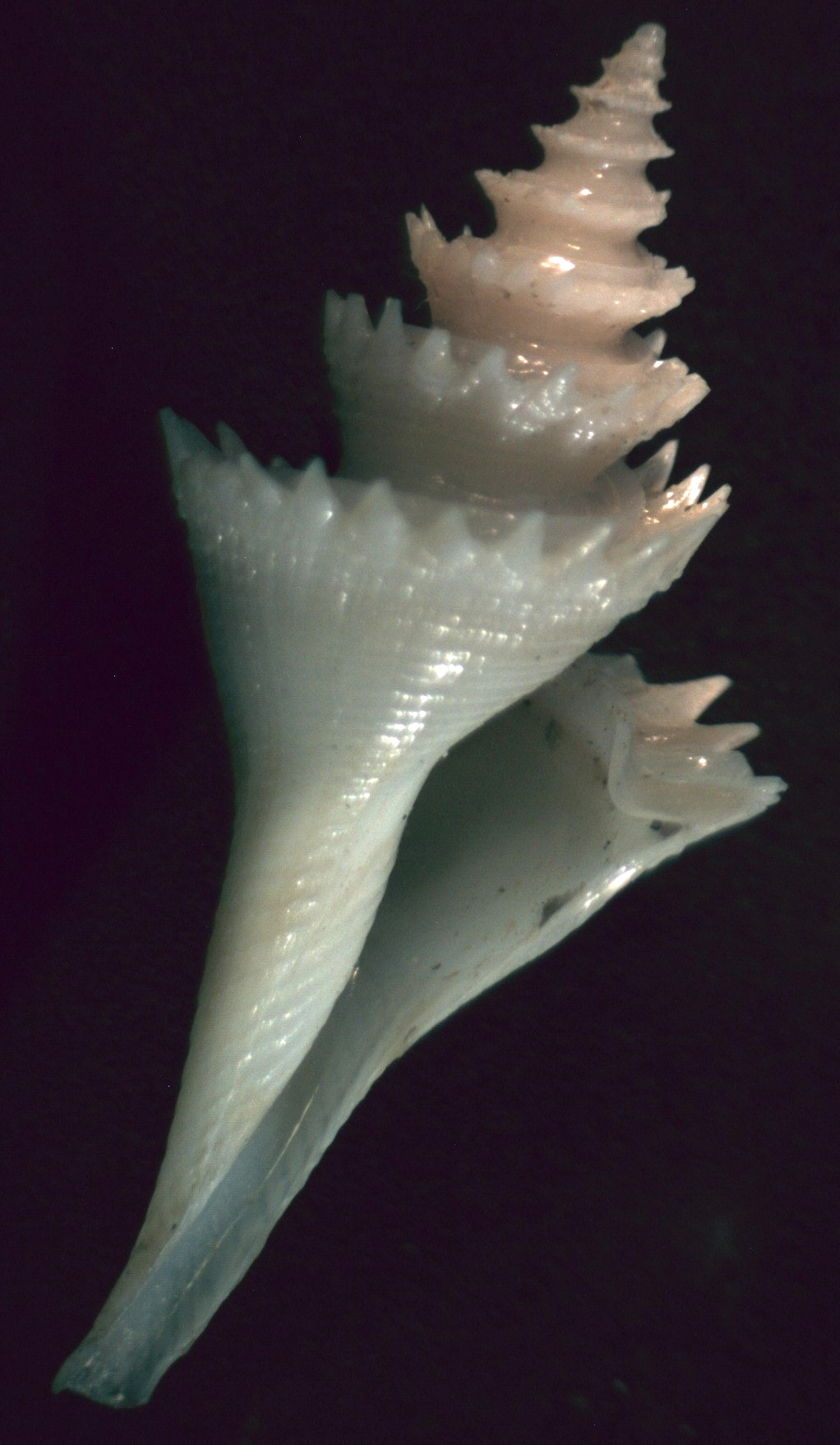
- Apertural view of Cochlespira radiata

Scientific classification
- Kingdom: Animalia
- Phylum: Mollusca
- Class: Gastropoda
- Subclass: Caenogastropoda
- Order: Neogastropoda
- Superfamily: Conoidea
- Family: Cochlespiridae
- Genus: Cochlespira
- Species: C. radiata

Binomial name
- Cochlespira radiata (Dall, 1889)

Synonyms
- Ancistrosyrinx radiata Dall., 1889; Pleurotoma radiata Dall, 1889

= Cochlespira radiata =

Species of gastropod

Cochlespira radiata, common name the common star turret, is a species of sea snail, a marine gastropod mollusk in the family Cochlespiridae.

== Description ==
The size of an adult shell varies between 9 mm and 32 mm.

(Original description) The shell is irregularly clouded with pale brown and white, or of a diffuse very pale brown. The protoconch contains two whorls, the first very small, rounded, obliquely set and partly immersed, arousing on casual inspection the unfounded suspicion that it is sinistral. The apex is sharp. The subsequent whorls (nine or ten) on the teleoconch at first show a sharp dentate peripheral keel, which afterward becomes spinous and more or less posteriorly directed. The spiral sculpture consists anteriorly of numerous rather widely separated fine threads, not granulose, but passing over rather coarse lines of growth and less crowded near the keel. The carina on the tenth whorl shows about twenty-six sharp short subtriangular spines more or less upturned; halfway between the keel and the carina is an elevated second keel, not undulate or dentate but much higher than in Cochlespira elegans. Behind this is the sinus, which is indented about one eighth of a turn. The fasciole is concave. The transverse sculpture consists of rather coarse prominent lines of growth which are often strongly marked. The aperture is narrow, elongate, notched for the sinus, the siphonal canal, and the carina;. The siphonal canal is long, narrow, rather open and slightly curved at the tip. The base of the shell is subconical and hardly rounded. The whole surface of the shell has a polished appearance like barley-sugar candy.

The soft parts of this species are whitish or pale straw-color. The tentacles are small, the eyes large and black. The operculum, thin and yellow, resembles that of Drillia. The sides of the foot are plain, the gills as usual.

== Distribution ==
This species occurs in the Gulf of Mexico, the Caribbean Sea and the Lesser Antilles.
