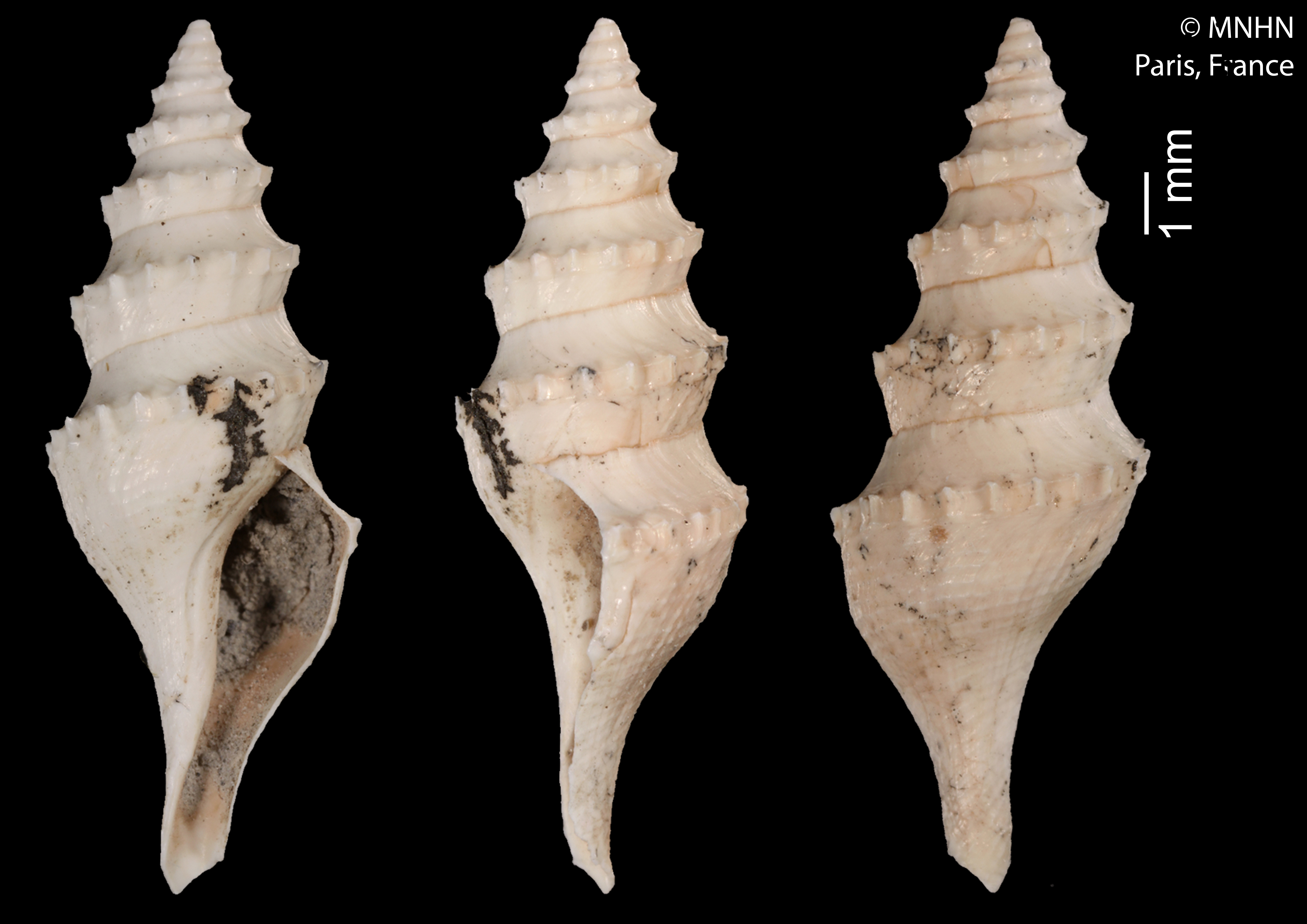
- Shell of † Lucerapex raulini (specimen at MNHN, Paris)

Scientific classification
- Kingdom: Animalia
- Phylum: Mollusca
- Class: Gastropoda
- Subclass: Caenogastropoda
- Order: Neogastropoda
- Superfamily: Conoidea
- Family: Turridae
- Genus: Lucerapex
- Species: L. raulini

Binomial name
- Lucerapex raulini (Peyrot, 1931)

Synonyms
- † Pleurotoma raulini Peyrot, 1931 (original combination)

= Lucerapex raulini =

Species of gastropod

Lucerapex raulini is an extinct species of sea snail, a marine gastropod mollusk in the family Turridae, the turrids.

== Distribution ==
Fossils of this extinct species were found in Oligocene strata in the Landes, France.
