= Cochlespira crispulata =

Scientific classification
- Kingdom: Animalia
- Phylum: Mollusca
- Class: Gastropoda
- Subclass: Caenogastropoda
- Order: Neogastropoda
- Superfamily: Conoidea
- Family: Cochlespiridae
- Genus: Cochlespira
- Species: C. crispulata

Binomial name
- Cochlespira crispulata (Martens, 1901)

Synonyms
- Leucosyrinx crispulata (Martens, 1901); Pleurotoma (Leucosyrinx) crispulata Martens, 1901 (original description)

Species of gastropod

Cochlespira crispulata is a species of sea snail, a marine gastropod mollusk in the family Cochlespiridae.

== Description ==
The length of the shell attains 37 mm, its diameter 9 mm.

The biconical-fusiform shell contains nine whorls. The first two are smooth and globose. The others are protruded, with the carina almost in the middle, but gradually attenuated to the base of the body whorl. The narrow aperture is elliptical. The outer lip is slender, arcuated above and emarginated below. The columellar lip is appressed. The elongated siphonal canal is slightly curved. The shell is brightly white, the external sculpture of the throat is diaphanous.

== Distribution ==
This species occurs in the Indian Ocean off Tanzania.
