= Cochlespira elongata =

Scientific classification
- Kingdom: Animalia
- Phylum: Mollusca
- Class: Gastropoda
- Subclass: Caenogastropoda
- Order: Neogastropoda
- Superfamily: Conoidea
- Family: Cochlespiridae
- Genus: Cochlespira
- Species: C. elongata

Binomial name
- Cochlespira elongata Simone, 1999

Species of gastropod

Cochlespira elongata is a species of sea snail, a marine gastropod mollusk in the family Cochlespiridae.

== Description ==
The length of an adult shell varies between 25 mm and 37 mm.

== Distribution ==
This species occurs in the Atlantic Ocean off Southern and Eastern Brazil.
