= Lucerapex carola =

Scientific classification
- Kingdom: Animalia
- Phylum: Mollusca
- Class: Gastropoda
- Subclass: Caenogastropoda
- Order: Neogastropoda
- Superfamily: Conoidea
- Family: Turridae
- Genus: Lucerapex
- Species: L. carola

Binomial name
- Lucerapex carola (Thiele, 1925)

Synonyms
- Pleurotoma carola Thiele, 1925

Species of gastropod

Lucerapex carola is a species of sea snail, a marine gastropod mollusk in the family Turridae, the turrids.

== Distribution ==
This species occurs in the Indian Ocean off Somalia
