= Lucerapex denticulata =

Scientific classification
- Kingdom: Animalia
- Phylum: Mollusca
- Class: Gastropoda
- Subclass: Caenogastropoda
- Order: Neogastropoda
- Superfamily: Conoidea
- Family: Turridae
- Genus: Lucerapex
- Species: L. denticulata

Binomial name
- Lucerapex denticulata (Thiele, 1925)

Synonyms
- Pleurotoma denticulata Thiele, 1925

Species of gastropod

Lucerapex denticulata is a species of sea snail, a marine gastropod mollusk in the family Turridae, the turrids.

== Description ==
The length of the shell varies between 13 mm and 19.2 mm.

== Distribution ==
This species occurs in the Indian Ocean off Somaliland, East Africa and the Gulf of Aden at depths between 730 m and 1270 m.
