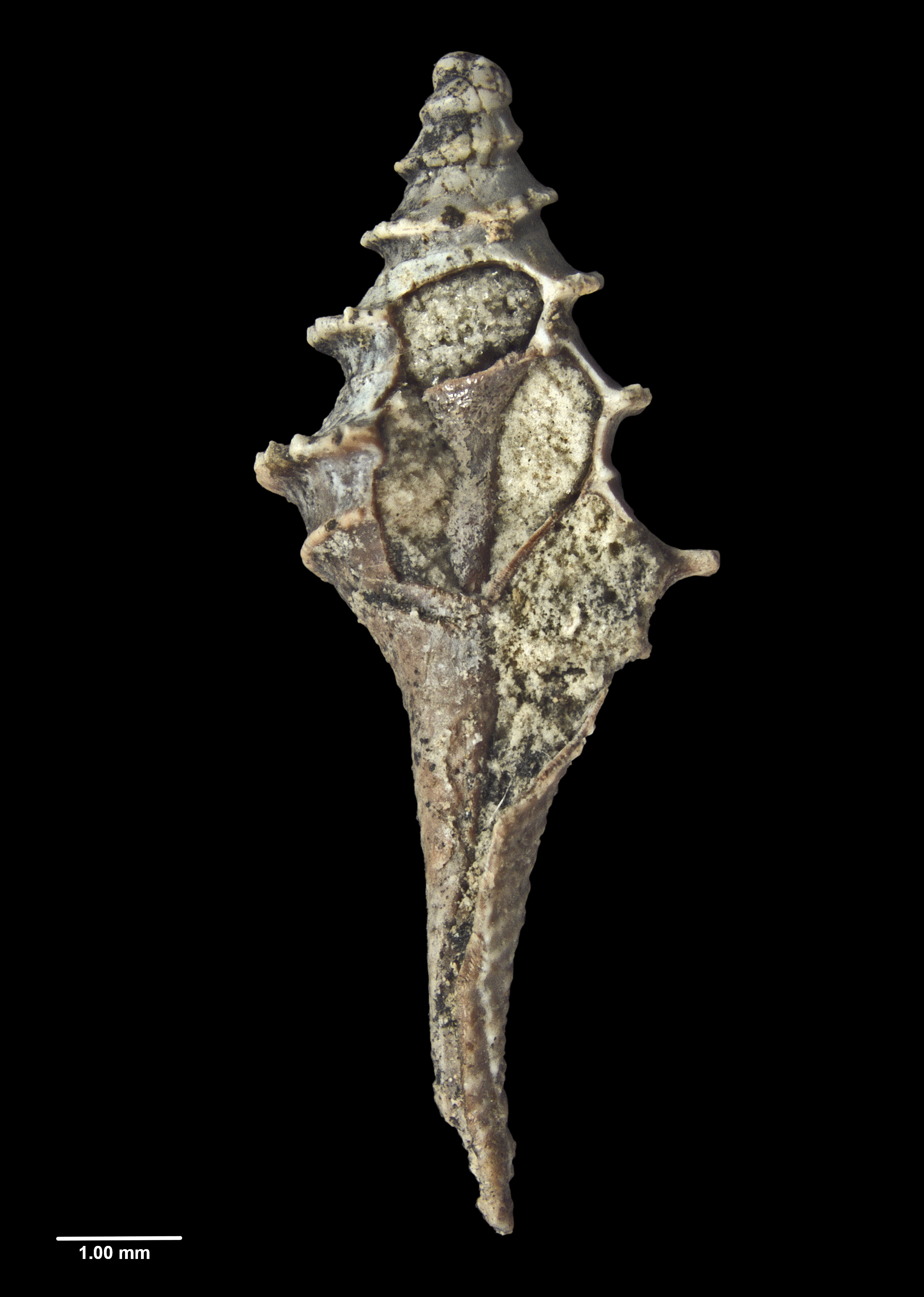
- Holotype from Auckland War Memorial Museum

Scientific classification
- Kingdom: Animalia
- Phylum: Mollusca
- Class: Gastropoda
- Subclass: Caenogastropoda
- Order: Neogastropoda
- Family: Cochlespiridae
- Genus: Cochlespira
- Species: †C. semiplana

Binomial name
- †Cochlespira semiplana A. W. B. Powell, 1944

Synonyms
- Coronasyrinx semiplana A. W. B. Powell, 1944

= Cochlespira semiplana =

Cochlespira semiplana Temporal range: late Eocene

Extinct species of gastropod

Cochlespira semiplana is an extinct species of sea snail, a marine gastropod mollusc, in the family Cochlespiridae. Fossils of the species date to late Eocene strata of the St Vincent Basin of South Australia, and the Otway Basin between South Australia and Victoria.

== Description ==
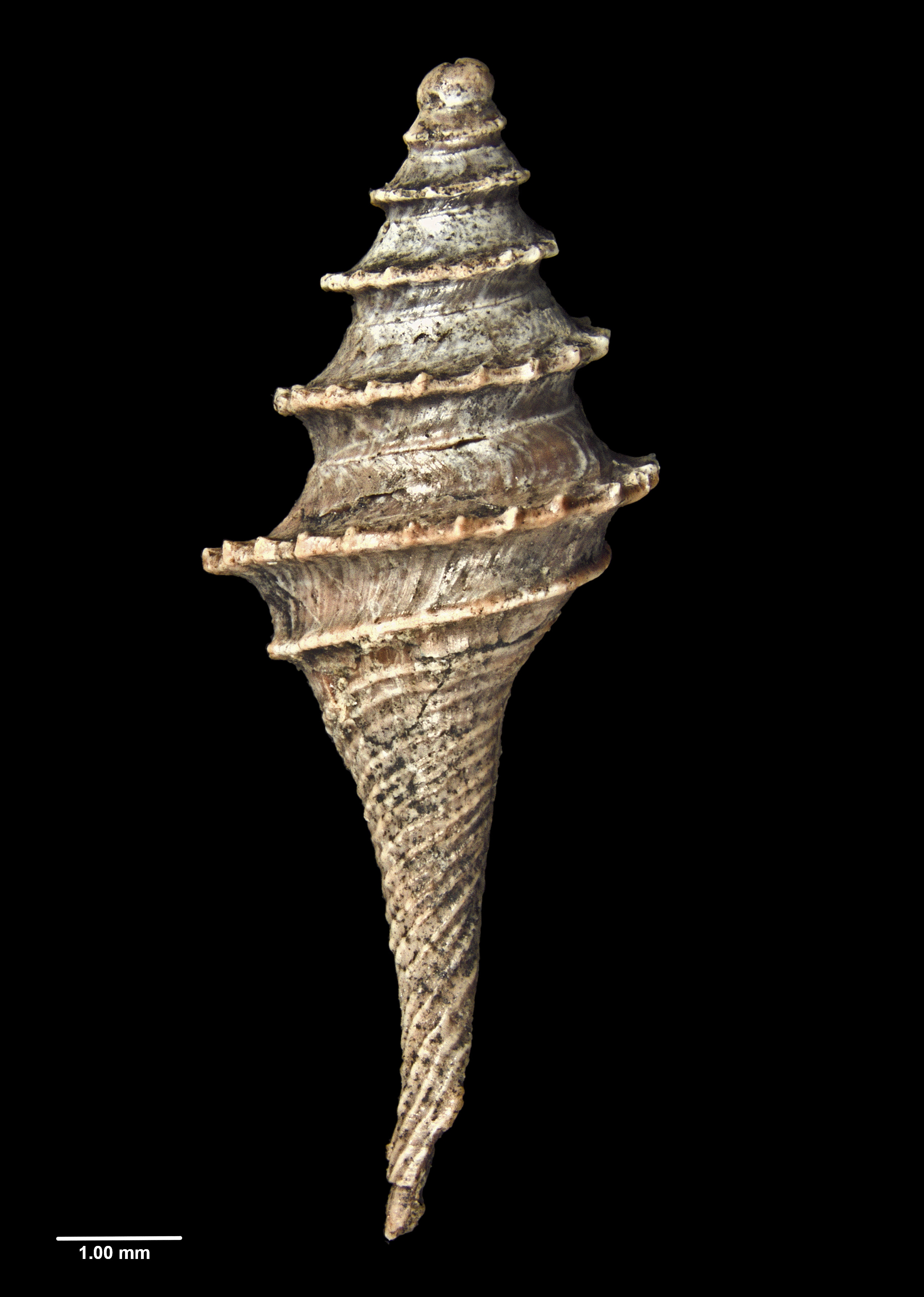
Reverse view of holotype

In the original description, Powell described the species as follows:

Shell of similar proportions to venusta, but with a more flange-like keel, bearing weaker tubercles, not upcurved, about 20 per whorl. There are no spirals on the spire-whorls, and the basal spirals are plain, not gemmulate. The body-whorl has a strong, sharply raised keel emerging from the suture and encircling the base. There are no spirals above this keel, but 21 plain cords from below it to the end of the anterior canal. Sinus and protoconch as in venusta.

The holotype of the species measures 9.6 mm (0.38 in) in height and has a diameter of 3.9 mm (0.15 in). It can be distinguished from other members of the genus Cochlespira due to having a broadly conical spire. The species has a globose to sub-globose protoconch, a deviated tip which measures between 1.5-2 smooth whorls which merged with the teleoconch.

== Taxonomy ==
The species was first described by A. W. B. Powell in 1944, using the name Coronasyrinx semiplana. In 1969, Powell recombined the species, leading to the currently accepted scientific name Cochlespira semiplana. The holotype was collected prior to 1944 from Aldinga, South Australia, and is held by the Auckland War Memorial Museum. The holotype has much of the ventral surface broken off, and represents an individual who was not fully adult.

== Distribution ==
This extinct marine species occurs in late Eocene strata of the St Vincent Basin of South Australia, including the Blanche Point Formation, and the Otway Basin between South Australia and Victoria, at the Browns Creek Formation.
