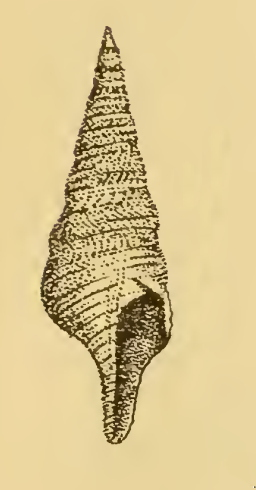
- Shell of Lucerapex murndaliana (holotype)

Scientific classification
- Kingdom: Animalia
- Phylum: Mollusca
- Class: Gastropoda
- Subclass: Caenogastropoda
- Order: Neogastropoda
- Superfamily: Conoidea
- Family: Turridae
- Genus: Lucerapex
- Species: L. murndaliana

Binomial name
- Lucerapex murndaliana (Tenison Woods, 1879)

Synonyms
- † Hemipleurotoma murndaliana Cossmann, 1896; † Lophiotoma murndaliana (Powell, 1944); † Pleurotoma murndaliana Tenison Woods, 1879 (original combination); † Turris murndaliana (Tenison Woods, 1879)

= Lucerapex murndaliana =

Species of gastropod

Lucerapex murndaliana is an extinct species of sea snail, a marine gastropod mollusk in the family Turridae, the turrids.

== Description ==
Dimensions: length 47 mm; breadth 13 5 mm; length of aperture 20 mm.

Original description:

This neat little species is distinguished by its long siphonal canal and pyramidal spire. The whorls are flattened, but have three raised rather broad keels, which are grooved upon the summit. It is upon the median keel the sinus is, and it becomes granular near the summit, with a rather faint but regular line of granules. Between the keels there are fine thread-like lirae, sometimes they are seen in the middle of the groove on the summit of the keel. The siphonal canal is slender and long, and even slightly recurved. The base is concave and cancellated. The apex is rather blunt, with a solid smooth protoconch of two whorls. The species has no very near ally, either recent or fossil.

The protoconch is composed of three elongate whorls, the initial portion being slightly inflated, whilst the anterior turns are obtusely carinate. The shell is narrow and elongate. It contains ten whorls, slightly convex, and has several bold, irregular, spiral threads or ridges, rather rugose where crossed by growth lines, and somewhat granulated in the neighbourhood of the sinus. The siphonal canal is long, slender, and twisted. The outer lip is serrate. The sinus is large and deep, and situated some distance from the suture.

== Distribution ==
Fossils of this extinct species were found in Middle Miocene strata at Muddy Creek, Hamilton, Victoria, Australia.
