= Kuroshioturris hyugaensis =

Scientific classification
- Kingdom: Animalia
- Phylum: Mollusca
- Class: Gastropoda
- Subclass: Caenogastropoda
- Order: Neogastropoda
- Superfamily: Conoidea
- Family: Turridae
- Genus: Kuroshioturris
- Species: K. hyugaensis

Binomial name
- Kuroshioturris hyugaensis (Shuto, 1961)

Synonyms
- † Gemmula (Kuroshioturris) hyugaensis Shuto, 1961 (basionym); Gemmula hyugaensis Shuto, 1961 (original combination); Turris hyugaensis T. Shuto, 1961

Species of gastropod

Kuroshioturris hyugaensis is a species of sea snail, a marine gastropod mollusk in the family Turridae, the turrids.

Fossils of † Gemmula (Kuroshioturris) hyugaensis have been found in Lowest Pliocene strata, Miyazaki Prefecture, Japan.

== Distribution ==
This marine species occurs off Japan.
