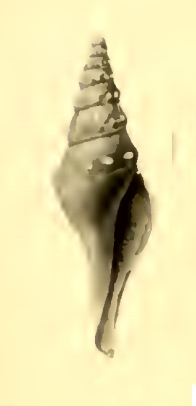
- Drawing of a shell of Lucerapex schepmani

Scientific classification
- Kingdom: Animalia
- Phylum: Mollusca
- Class: Gastropoda
- Subclass: Caenogastropoda
- Order: Neogastropoda
- Superfamily: Conoidea
- Family: Turridae
- Genus: Lucerapex
- Species: L. schepmani

Binomial name
- Lucerapex schepmani Shuto, 1970

= Lucerapex schepmani =

Species of gastropod

Lucerapex schepmani is a species of sea snail, a marine gastropod mollusk in the family Turridae, the turrids.

The specific name schepmani is in honor of Dutch malacologist Mattheus Marinus Schepman.

== Description ==
The length of the shell attains 9.5 mm.

This species was originally described by M.M. Schepman as one specimen out of ten Surcula variabilis, but redescribed by T. Shuto.

== Distribution ==
This marine species occurs in the Ceram Sea, Indonesia.
