= Cochlespira zanzibarica =

Scientific classification
- Kingdom: Animalia
- Phylum: Mollusca
- Class: Gastropoda
- Subclass: Caenogastropoda
- Order: Neogastropoda
- Superfamily: Conoidea
- Family: Cochlespiridae
- Genus: Cochlespira
- Species: C. zanzibarica

Binomial name
- Cochlespira zanzibarica Sysoev, 1996

Species of gastropod

Cochlespira zanzibarica is a species of sea snail, a marine gastropod mollusk in the family Cochlespiridae.

== Description ==
The length of the shell attains 16.9 mm, its diameter is 6.9 mm.

== Distribution ==
This species occurs in the Indian Ocean off Zanzibar and Madagascar.
