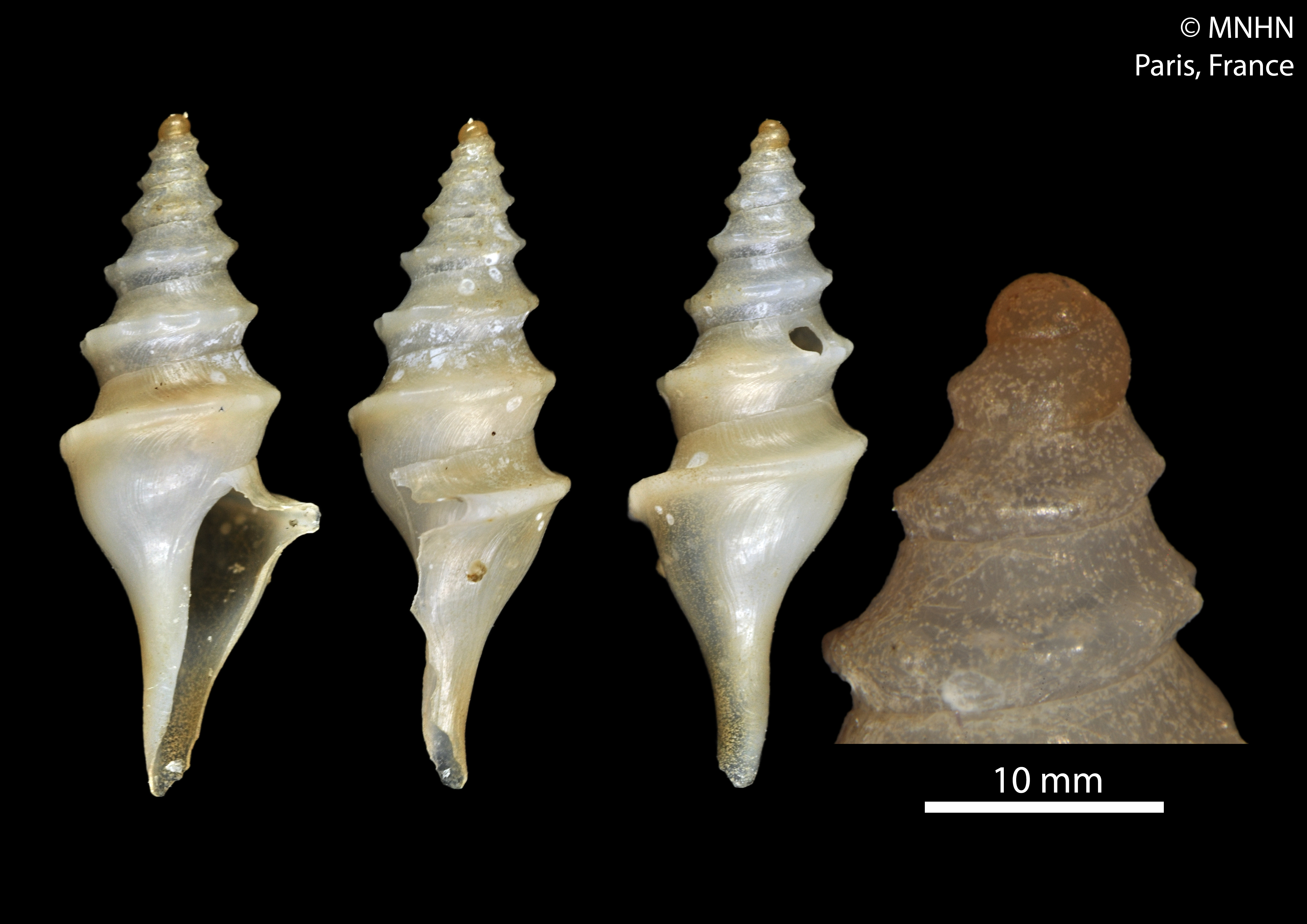
- Shell of Lucerapex laevicarinata (holotype at MNHN, Paris)

Scientific classification
- Kingdom: Animalia
- Phylum: Mollusca
- Class: Gastropoda
- Subclass: Caenogastropoda
- Order: Neogastropoda
- Superfamily: Conoidea
- Family: Turridae
- Genus: Lucerapex
- Species: L. laevicarinata

Binomial name
- Lucerapex laevicarinata Kantor, Fedosov & Puillandre, 2018

Synonyms
- Lucerapex laevicarinatus Kantor, Fedosov & Puillandre, 2018 (wrong gender agreement of specific epithet)

= Lucerapex laevicarinata =

Species of gastropod

Lucerapex laevicarinata is a species of sea snail, a marine gastropod mollusk in the family Turridae, the turrids.

The species was described in 2018 by Kantor, Fedosov and Puillandre. It is placed in the genus Lucerapex, erected by Wenz in 1943 with Pleurotoma casearia (Hedley & Petterd, 1906) as its type species. Like the rest of Turridae, the genus sits within the superfamily Conoidea, the large and taxonomically unsettled group that also contains the cone snails and the auger snails.

The name has appeared in the literature as Lucerapex laevicarinatus, a variant that reflects incorrect gender agreement of the specific epithet rather than a separate taxon.

== Description ==
The shell reaches a length of 12.6 mm, placing the species among the smaller members of a family whose shells are typically elongated and high-spired with a narrow aperture and a distinct anal notch.

== Distribution ==
L. laevicarinata is known from marine waters off New Caledonia in the southwestern Pacific. The genus as a whole has a broad Indo-West Pacific range, and fossil Lucerapex have been recorded from Quaternary deposits in Timor and Indonesia and from Miocene strata in South Australia and New Zealand.
