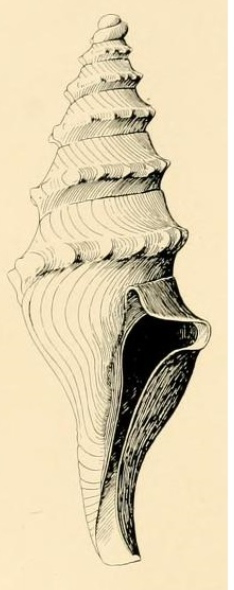
- Original image of a shell of Lucerapex casearia

Scientific classification
- Kingdom: Animalia
- Phylum: Mollusca
- Class: Gastropoda
- Subclass: Caenogastropoda
- Order: Neogastropoda
- Superfamily: Conoidea
- Family: Turridae
- Genus: Lucerapex
- Species: L. casearia

Binomial name
- Lucerapex casearia (Hedley & Petterd, 1906)

Synonyms
- Pleurotoma casearia Hedley & Petterd, 1906

= Lucerapex casearia =

Species of gastropod

Lucerapex casearia is a species of sea snail, a marine gastropod mollusk in the family Turridae, the turrids.

The subspecies Lucerapex casearia regilla Iredale, 1936 is a synonym of Pagodaturris regilla (Iredale, 1936) (basionym)

== Description ==
The length of the shell attains 21 mm.

(Original description) The thin, slender shell has a fusiform shape. The spire is keeled and turreted. The base is contracted. The shell consists of seven whorls, including a 1½ whorls in the protoconch, parted by linear rather oblique impressed sutures. The colour varies from pearl grey to pale orange, usually cheese colour.

Sculpture: the paucispiral protoconch is glassy with rounded whorls, the adult smooth and somewhat glossy though duller than the protoconch. The periphery is sharply produced into a projecting keel. The fasciole is set with pointed radiating tubercles, of which the penultimate whorl bears eighteen. These tubercles continue upwards, diminishing proportionately to the protoconch. But downwards they degenerate on the body whorl to imbricating scales. The unarmed keel slightly rises at its termination, bringing the shelf above it nearer to the horizontal. The fasciole ends in a deep and narrow slit. The anal sinus is spout-like. The siphonal canal is open, produced, bent a little to the right. Under the lens, delicate growth lines appear which diverge acutely above and below the keel, crossing the base they are flexed. The aperture is narrowly pyriform, a callus spread on the inner lip.

== Distribution ==
This marine species is endemic to Australia and occurs off Sidney, New South Wales.
