= Cochlespira simillima =

Scientific classification
- Kingdom: Animalia
- Phylum: Mollusca
- Class: Gastropoda
- Subclass: Caenogastropoda
- Order: Neogastropoda
- Superfamily: Conoidea
- Family: Cochlespiridae
- Genus: Cochlespira
- Species: C. simillima

Binomial name
- Cochlespira simillima Powell, 1969

Species of gastropod

Cochlespira simillima is a species of sea snail, a marine gastropod mollusk in the family Cochlespiridae.

== Description ==
The length of the shell varies between 20.75 mm and 45 mm.

== Distribution ==
This marine species occurs off the Philippines and Madagascar.
