= Kuroshioturris albogemmata =

Scientific classification
- Kingdom: Animalia
- Phylum: Mollusca
- Class: Gastropoda
- Subclass: Caenogastropoda
- Order: Neogastropoda
- Superfamily: Conoidea
- Family: Turridae
- Genus: Kuroshioturris
- Species: K. albogemmata

Binomial name
- Kuroshioturris albogemmata Kuroda, Habe & Oyama, 1971

Species of gastropod

Kuroshioturris albogemmata is a species of sea snail, a marine gastropod mollusk in the family Turridae, the turrids.

== Description ==
The length of the shell attains 20 mm.

== Distribution ==
The species has been observed in the northwest of the Pacific Ocean, as well as Kanagawa, Japan, Northern Taiwan, Palawan, Philippines, and Zhejiang, China.

== Taxonomy ==
The species' name may derive from Latin albus meaning white, and gemmatus, meaning bedazzled, referring to its white 'jewel' markings.
