= Aliceia okutanii =

Scientific classification
- Kingdom: Animalia
- Phylum: Mollusca
- Class: Gastropoda
- Subclass: Caenogastropoda
- Order: Neogastropoda
- Superfamily: Conoidea
- Family: Raphitomidae
- Genus: Aliceia
- Species: A. okutanii

Binomial name
- Aliceia okutanii Sasaki & Warén, 2007

Species of gastropod

Aliceia okutanii is a species of sea snail belonging to the genus Aliceia in the family Raphitomidae.

== Distribution ==
A. okutanii occurs off the coast of Japan. Consistent with other aquatic micromollusc species, this species is rare, and few specimens have been collected.

== Description ==
The length of the shell attains 4.9 mm. The shell of the species is also notably long among micromolluscs, with it having a distinct multispiral and sinistral pattern.
