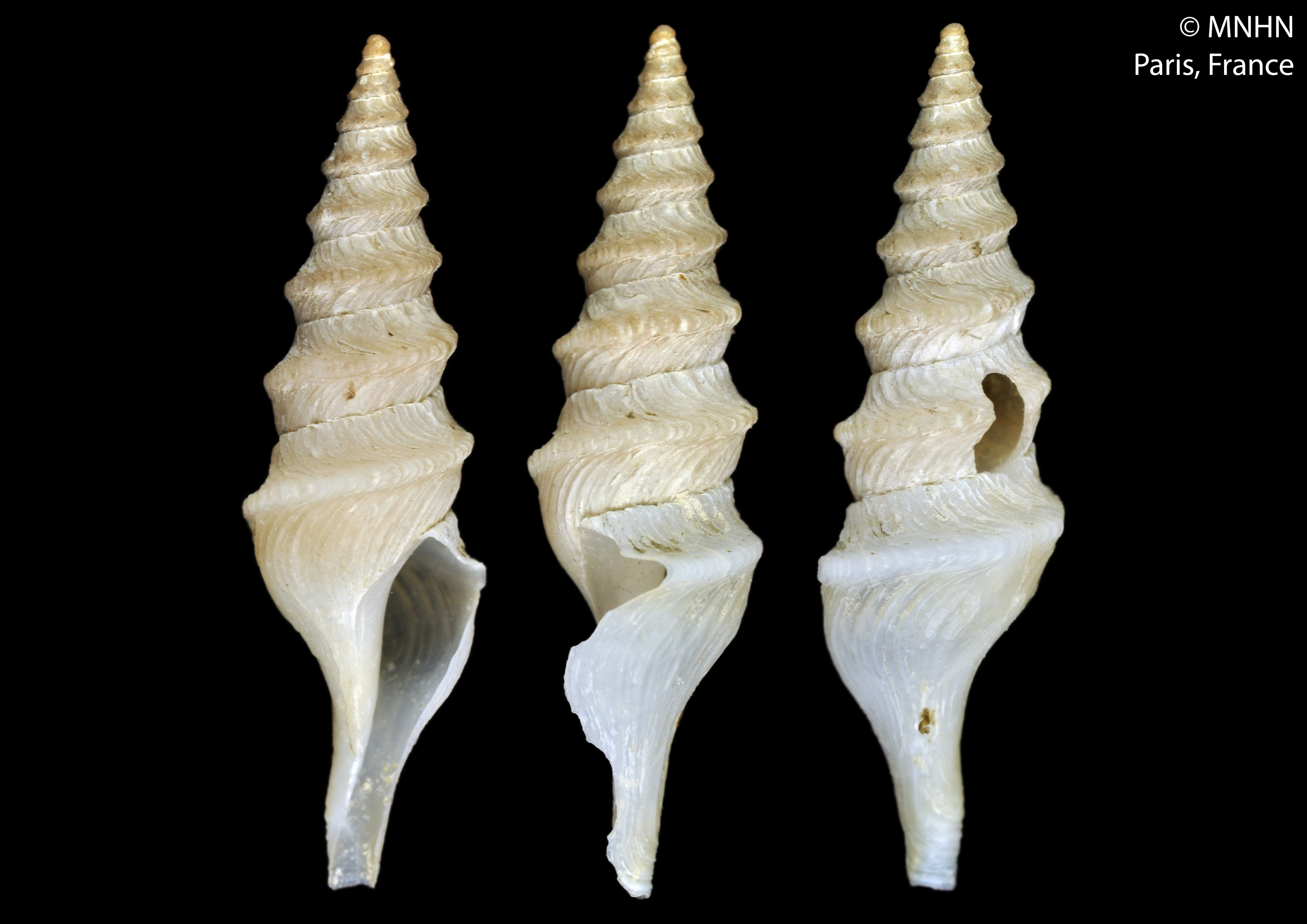
- Shell of Lucerapex cracens (holotype at MNHN, Paris)

Scientific classification
- Kingdom: Animalia
- Phylum: Mollusca
- Class: Gastropoda
- Subclass: Caenogastropoda
- Order: Neogastropoda
- Superfamily: Conoidea
- Family: Turridae
- Genus: Lucerapex
- Species: L. cracens

Binomial name
- Lucerapex cracens Kantor, Fedosov & Puillandre, 2018

= Lucerapex cracens =

Species of gastropod

Lucerapex cracens is a species of sea snail, a marine gastropod mollusk in the family Turridae, the turrids.

== Distribution ==
This marine species occurs off the Solomon Islands.
