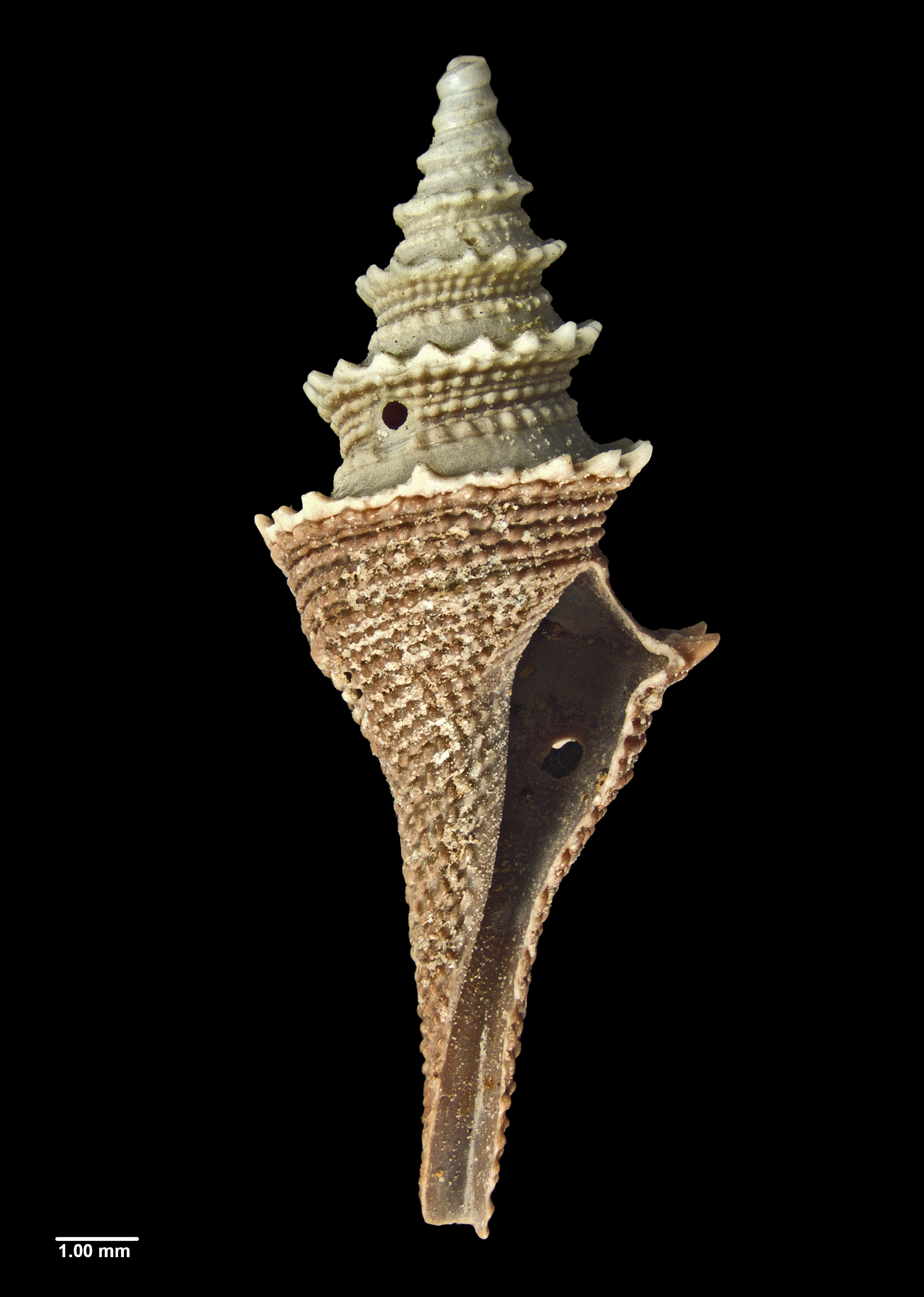
- Holotype from Auckland War Memorial Museum

Scientific classification
- Kingdom: Animalia
- Phylum: Mollusca
- Class: Gastropoda
- Subclass: Caenogastropoda
- Order: Neogastropoda
- Family: Cochlespiridae
- Genus: Cochlespira
- Species: †C. venusta

Binomial name
- †Cochlespira venusta A. W. B. Powell, 1944

Synonyms
- Coronasyrinx venusta A. W. B. Powell, 1944

= Cochlespira venusta =

Cochlespira venusta Temporal range: early Miocene–middle Miocene

Extinct species of gastropod

Cochlespira venusta is an extinct species of sea snail, a marine gastropod mollusc, in the family Cochlespiridae. Fossils of the species date to early to middle Miocene strata of the Port Phillip Basin of Victoria, Australia.

== Description ==
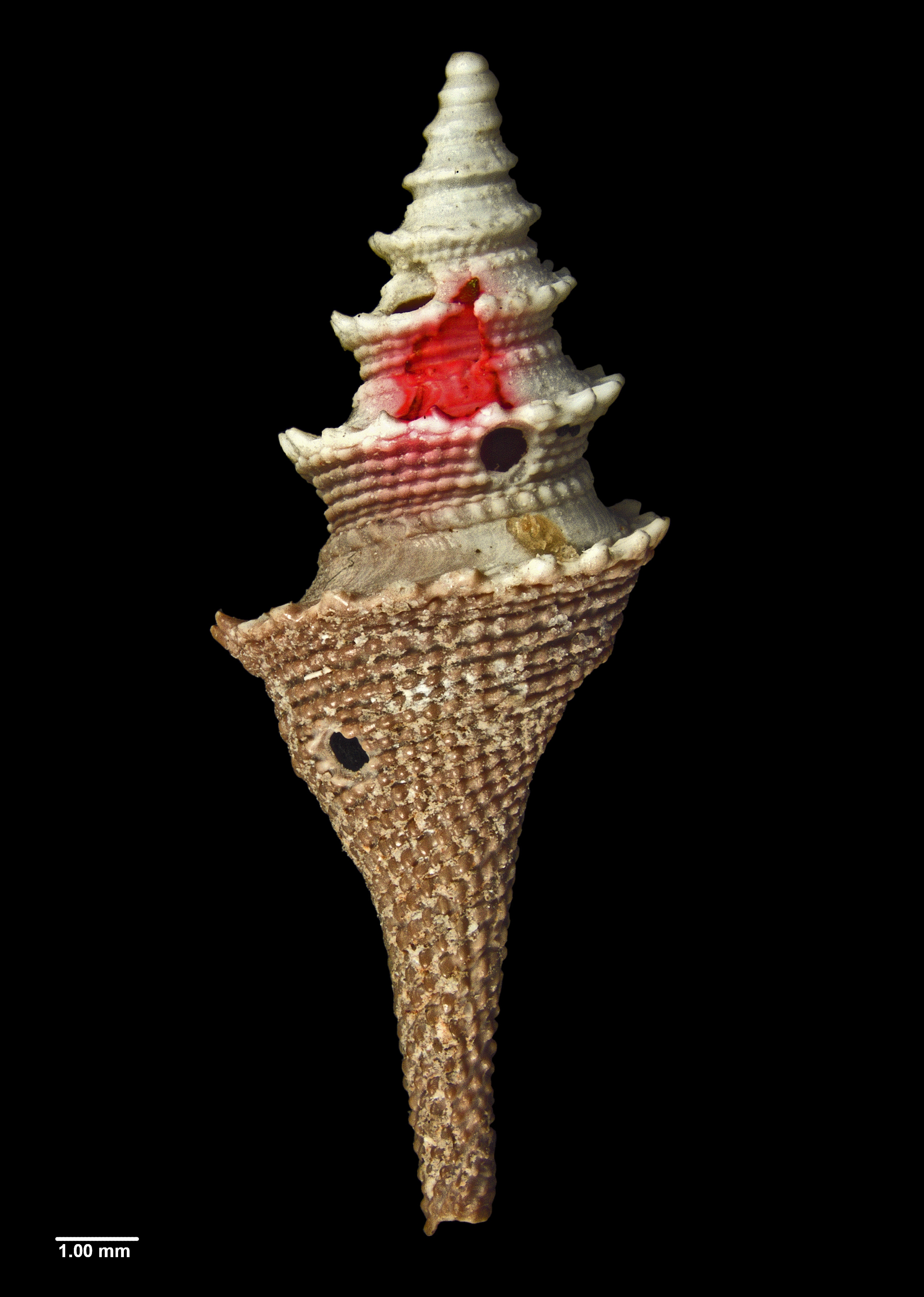
Reverse view of holotype

In the original description, Powell described the species as follows:

SSlender, fusiform, with tall spire and long, straight, anterior canal. Whorls keeled and coronated medially by strong upcurved tubercles, 18 per whorl. Shoulder with a subsutural band of recurrently oblique oval gemmules, and two similar but much weaker bands immediately above the coronated keel. Between the subsutural and lower gemmulate bands the shoulder is smooth except for weakly defined sinus growth curves. From the keel to the lower suture there are four strong, closely spaced gemmulate spiral bands. On the body-whorl there are 27 gemmulate spirals which extend right to the tip of the anterior canal. One vemmulate cord much stronger than the rest emerges from the lower suture and encircles the base.

The holotype of the species measures 14.8 mm (0.58 in) in height and has a diameter of 5.8 mm (0.23 in). It can be distinguished from other members of the genus Cochlespira by its strongly gemmate spiral chords, as well as its gemmate margining cord, and by having finer spiral cords, a weaker keel and a more flattened protoconch relative to C. semiplana. The species has a narrowly fusiform shell, keeled spire whorls which are coronated medially by strongly upcurving tubercles.

== Taxonomy ==
The species was first described by A. W. B. Powell in 1944, using the name Coronasyrinx venusta and identifying it as the type species of the genus Coronasyrinx. In 1969, Powell recombined the species, leading to the currently accepted scientific name Cochlespira venusta. The holotype was collected prior to 1944 from Fossil Beach, Balcombe Bay, Victoria, and is held by the Auckland War Memorial Museum.

== Distribution ==
This extinct marine species occurs in early to middle Miocene strata of the Port Phillip Basin of Victoria, Australia, including the Puebla Formation and Gellibrand Formation.
