= Lucerapex indagatoris =

Scientific classification
- Kingdom: Animalia
- Phylum: Mollusca
- Class: Gastropoda
- Subclass: Caenogastropoda
- Order: Neogastropoda
- Superfamily: Conoidea
- Family: Turridae
- Genus: Lucerapex
- Species: L. indagatoris

Binomial name
- Lucerapex indagatoris (Finlay H.J., 1927)

Synonyms
- Gemmula indagatoris Finlay H.J., 1927; Pleurotoma optata E.A. Smith, 1899 (invalid, not Harris, 1897)

Species of gastropod

Lucerapex indagatoris is a species of sea snail, a marine gastropod mollusk in the family Turridae, the turrids.

== Description ==
The length of the shell attains 44 mm.

== Distribution ==
This marine species occurs off Southern India and off Réunion.
