= Kuroshioturris kurodai =

Scientific classification
- Kingdom: Animalia
- Phylum: Mollusca
- Class: Gastropoda
- Subclass: Caenogastropoda
- Order: Neogastropoda
- Superfamily: Conoidea
- Family: Turridae
- Genus: Kuroshioturris
- Species: K. kurodai

Binomial name
- Kuroshioturris kurodai (Makiyama, 1927)

Synonyms
- † Mangilia kurodai Makiyama, 1927 (original combination)

Species of gastropod

Kuroshioturris kurodai is a species of sea snail, a marine gastropod mollusk in the family Turridae, the turrids.

== Distribution ==
This marine species occurs off Japan.
