= Kuroshioturris nipponica =

Scientific classification
- Kingdom: Animalia
- Phylum: Mollusca
- Class: Gastropoda
- Subclass: Caenogastropoda
- Order: Neogastropoda
- Superfamily: Conoidea
- Family: Turridae
- Genus: Kuroshioturris
- Species: K. nipponica

Binomial name
- Kuroshioturris nipponica (Shuto, 1961)

Synonyms
- † Gemmula (Ptychosyrinx) nipponica Shuto, 1961 (basionym); Gemmula nipponica Shuto, 1961 (original combination)

Species of gastropod

Kuroshioturris nipponica is a species of sea snail, a marine gastropod mollusk in the family Turridae, the turrids.

== Description ==
The length of the shell attains eight mm.

== Distribution ==
This marine species occurs off Japan and the Philippines at depths between 100 m and 1445 m.
