= Cochlespira bevdeynzerae =

Scientific classification
- Kingdom: Animalia
- Phylum: Mollusca
- Class: Gastropoda
- Subclass: Caenogastropoda
- Order: Neogastropoda
- Superfamily: Conoidea
- Family: Cochlespiridae
- Genus: Cochlespira
- Species: C. bevdeynzerae

Binomial name
- Cochlespira bevdeynzerae Garcia, 2010

Species of gastropod

Cochlespira bevdeynzerae is a species of sea snail, a marine gastropod mollusk in the family Cochlespiridae.

== Description ==
The length of the shell attains 50 mm.

== Distribution ==
This marine species occurs off Colombia.
