= Aliceia simplicissima =

Scientific classification
- Kingdom: Animalia
- Phylum: Mollusca
- Class: Gastropoda
- Subclass: Caenogastropoda
- Order: Neogastropoda
- Superfamily: Conoidea
- Family: Raphitomidae
- Genus: Aliceia
- Species: A. simplicissima

Binomial name
- Aliceia simplicissima (Thiele, 1925)

Synonyms
- Pleurotoma (Gemmula) simplicissima Thiele, 1925 superseded combination; Pleurotoma simplicissima Thiele, 1925

Species of gastropod

Aliceia simplicissima is a species of sea snail, a marine gastropod mollusk in the family Raphitomidae.

== Distribution ==
This marine species occurs off Zanzibar, Western Sumatra, Indonesia and in the Arafura Sea at depths of 356–470 m; off Kinkazan Island, Japan at a depth of 486 m.
