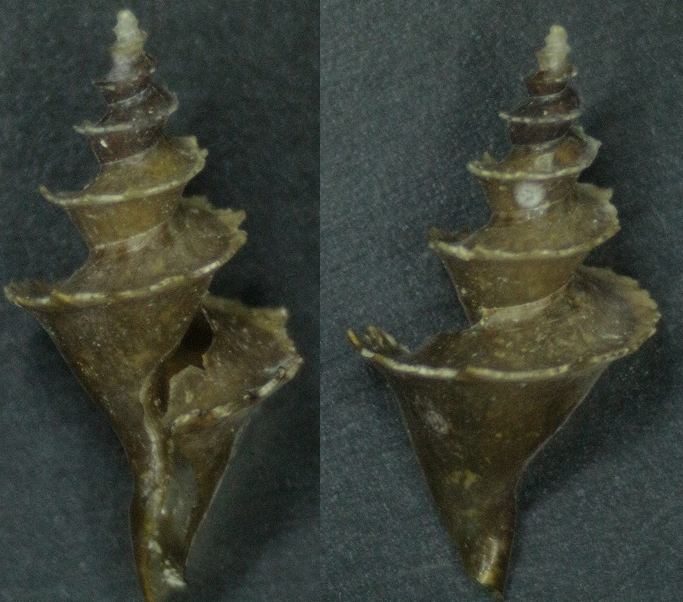
- Shell of Thatcheriasyrinx orientis

Scientific classification
- Kingdom: Animalia
- Phylum: Mollusca
- Class: Gastropoda
- Subclass: Caenogastropoda
- Order: Neogastropoda
- Superfamily: Conoidea
- Family: Raphitomidae
- Genus: Thatcheriasyrinx
- Species: T. orientis

Binomial name
- Thatcheriasyrinx orientis (Melvill, 1904)

Synonyms
- Ancistrosyrinx orientis Melvill, 1904

= Thatcheriasyrinx orientis =

Species of gastropod

Thatcheriasyrinx orientis is a species of sea snail, a marine gastropod mollusk in the family Raphitomidae.

Subspecies

- Thatcheriasyrinx orientis kawamurai (Kuroda, 1959) (found off the Ogasawara Islands, Japan)

== Description ==
The length of the shell attains 9-18 mm, its diameter 4 mm.

== Distribution ==
This marine species occurs in the Red Sea, the Persian Gulf and the Gulf of Oman; Philippines, and off Hawaii (this is probably a species of Aliceia)
