= Cochlespira laurettamarrae =

Scientific classification
- Kingdom: Animalia
- Phylum: Mollusca
- Class: Gastropoda
- Subclass: Caenogastropoda
- Order: Neogastropoda
- Superfamily: Conoidea
- Family: Cochlespiridae
- Genus: Cochlespira
- Species: C. laurettamarrae

Binomial name
- Cochlespira laurettamarrae Garcia, 2010

Species of gastropod

Cochlespira laurettamarrae is a species of sea snail, a marine gastropod mollusk in the family Cochlespiridae.

== Distribution ==
This species occurs in the Gulf of Panama.
