= Lucerapex pulcherrimus =

Scientific classification
- Kingdom: Animalia
- Phylum: Mollusca
- Class: Gastropoda
- Subclass: Caenogastropoda
- Order: Neogastropoda
- Superfamily: Conoidea
- Family: Turridae
- Genus: Lucerapex
- Species: L. pulcherrimus

Binomial name
- Lucerapex pulcherrimus (Vella, 1954)

Synonyms
- † Micantapex pulcherrimus Vella, 1954

Species of gastropod

Lucerapex pulcherrimus is an extinct species of sea snail, a marine gastropod mollusk in the family Turridae, the turrids.

== Distribution ==
Fossils of this extinct species were found in Tertiary strata from south-east Wairarapa, New Zealand.
