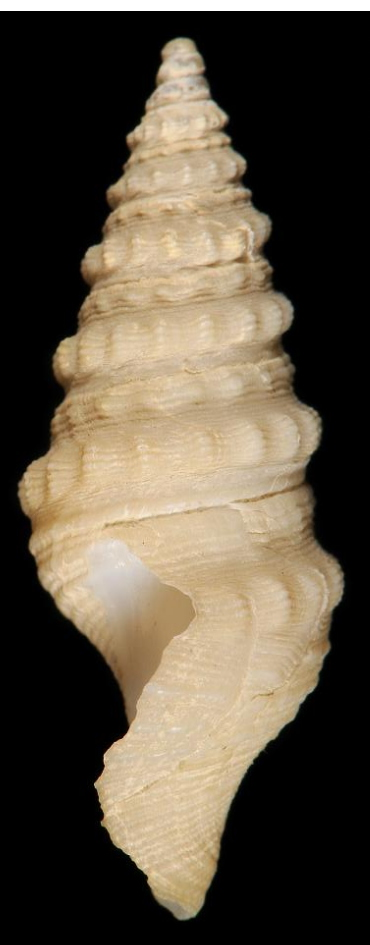
- Shell of Kuroshioturris angustata

Scientific classification
- Kingdom: Animalia
- Phylum: Mollusca
- Class: Gastropoda
- Subclass: Caenogastropoda
- Order: Neogastropoda
- Superfamily: Conoidea
- Family: Turridae
- Genus: Kuroshioturris; Shuto, 1961

Type species
- † Gemmula (Kuroshioturris) hyugaensis Shuto, 1961

Synonyms
- Comitas oahuensis Powell, 1969; Gemmula (Kuroshioturris) Shuto, 1961

= Kuroshioturris =

Genus of gastropods

Kuroshioturris is a genus of sea snails, marine gastropod mollusks in the family Turridae, the turrids.

== Species ==
Species within the genus Kuroshioturris include:

- Kuroshioturris albogemmata Kuroda, Habe & Oyama, 1971
- Kuroshioturris angustata (Powell, 1940)
- † Kuroshioturris asukana (Yokoyama, 1926)
- † Kuroshioturris candylia C.-H. Hu & X.-F. Lee, 1991
- Kuroshioturris hyugaensis (Shuto, 1961)
- Kuroshioturris kurodai (Makiyama, 1927)
- Kuroshioturris nipponica (Shuto, 1961)
- Kuroshioturris oahuensis (A. W. B. Powell, 1969)
- Kuroshioturris putere Beu, 2011 †
