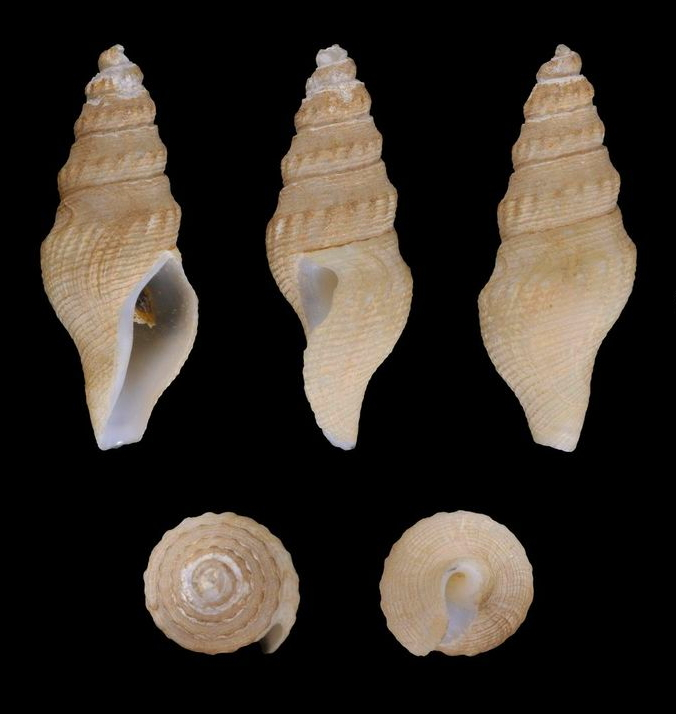
- Shell of Kuroshioturris oahuensis(holotype at the Smithsonian Institution)

Scientific classification
- Kingdom: Animalia
- Phylum: Mollusca
- Class: Gastropoda
- Subclass: Caenogastropoda
- Order: Neogastropoda
- Superfamily: Conoidea
- Family: Turridae
- Genus: Kuroshioturris
- Species: K. oahuensis

Binomial name
- Kuroshioturris oahuensis Powell, 1969

Synonyms
- Comitas oahuensis A. W. B. Powell, 1969 superseded combination

= Kuroshioturris oahuensis =

Species of gastropod

Kuroshioturris oahuensis is a species of sea snail, a marine gastropod mollusc in the family Turridae.

== Description ==
The length of the shell varies between 16.8 mm and 17.25 mm, the diameter between 6.9 mm and 7.75 mm.

== Distribution ==
This marine species occurs off Hawaii.
