= Kuroshioturris putere =

Scientific classification
- Kingdom: Animalia
- Phylum: Mollusca
- Class: Gastropoda
- Subclass: Caenogastropoda
- Order: Neogastropoda
- Superfamily: Conoidea
- Family: Turridae
- Genus: Kuroshioturris
- Species: K. putere

Binomial name
- Kuroshioturris putere Beu, 2011

Species of gastropod

Kuroshioturris putere is an extinct species of sea snail, a marine gastropod mollusk in the family Turridae, the turrids.

== Description ==
The holotype measures 13.7 mm, its diameter 6.3 mm.

== Distribution ==
Fossils of this extinct marine species were found in New Zealand.
