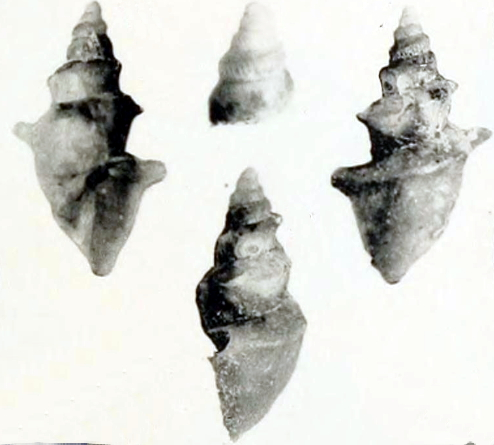
- Original image of shells of Aliceia aenigmatica

Scientific classification
- Kingdom: Animalia
- Phylum: Mollusca
- Class: Gastropoda
- Subclass: Caenogastropoda
- Order: Neogastropoda
- Superfamily: Conoidea
- Family: Raphitomidae
- Genus: Aliceia
- Species: A. aenigmatica

Binomial name
- Aliceia aenigmatica Dautzenberg & Fischer H., 1897

= Aliceia aenigmatica =

Species of gastropod

Aliceia aenigmatica is a species of sea snail, a marine gastropod mollusk in the family Raphitomidae.

== Description ==
The length of the shell attains 3.4 mm, its diameter 1.8 mm.

(Original description in Latin) The shell is tall, remarkably thin, glossy, and transparent, with a broad and deep umbilicus. The spire is elevated and turreted, consisting of 7 convex whorls that are stepped and clearly separated by an impressed suture.

The protoconch is smooth, while the next three whorls are keeled at the midpoint: above the keel, they are smooth, while below, they are adorned with closely spaced longitudinal ribs. In the body whorl these ribs disappear, but the keel remains and is decorated with widely spaced, arched scales that curve forward. The aperture is triangular, tapering to a pointed base. The columella is fairly straight, with a slight reflex above the umbilicus.

The outer lip is extremely thin, sharp, and channeled at the top. The umbilicus is wide, funnel-shaped, and open. The early whorls are yellowish, gradually transitioning to a white and translucent appearance in the final whorls.

== Distribution ==
This marine species occurs off the Azores at bathyal depths (1800-1980 m); also off the coast of Brazil.
