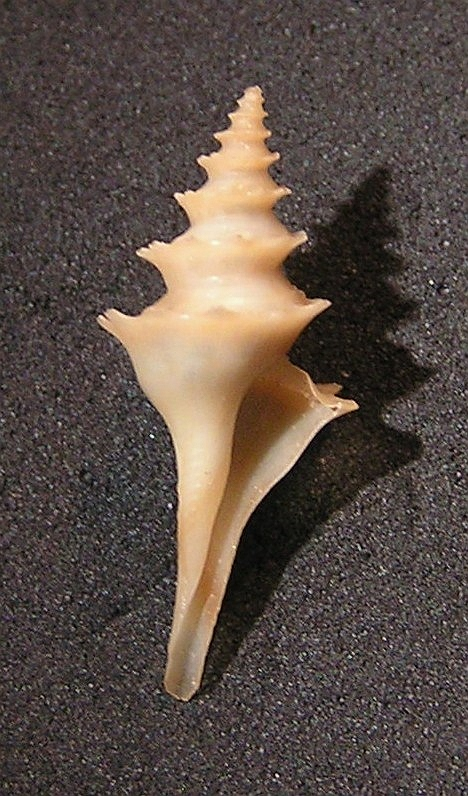
- Apertural view of a shell of Cochlespira cedonulli

Scientific classification
- Kingdom: Animalia
- Phylum: Mollusca
- Class: Gastropoda
- Subclass: Caenogastropoda
- Order: Neogastropoda
- Superfamily: Conoidea
- Family: Cochlespiridae
- Genus: Cochlespira
- Species: C. cedonulli

Binomial name
- Cochlespira cedonulli (Reeve, 1843)

Synonyms
- Ancistrosyrinx cedonulli (Reeve, 1843); Pleurotoma cedonulli Reeve, 1843

= Cochlespira cedonulli =

Species of gastropod

Cochlespira cedonulli is a species of sea snail, a marine gastropod mollusk in the family Cochlespiridae and was first discovered by L.A. Reeve in 1843.

== Description ==
The size of an adult shell varies between 20 mm and 35 mm.

In view of the ambiguity of Reeve's figure it might be well to say that this species has no axial sculpture on the whorls between the carina and the base except what may be due to accidents during growth. The surface is normally smooth and polished, above and below the carina, and of a delicate pale brown color.

== Distribution ==
This marine species occurs from the Gulf of California, West Mexico to Peru and also off the Galápagos.
