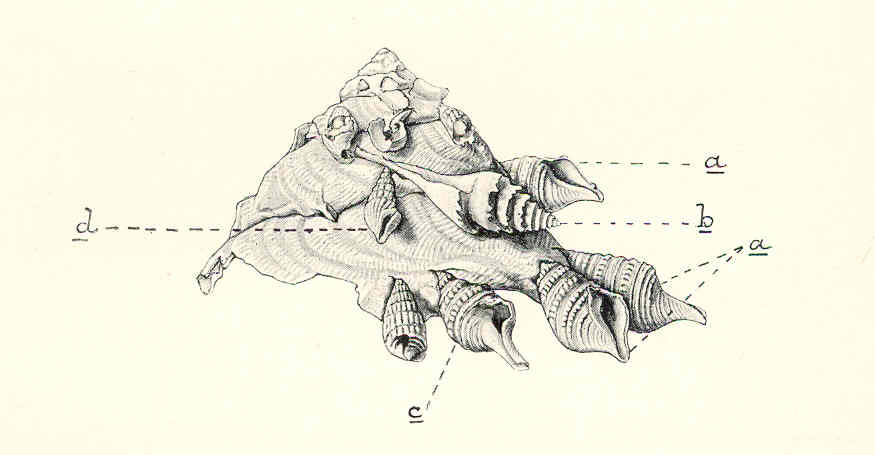

Scientific classification
- Kingdom: Animalia
- Phylum: Mollusca
- Class: Gastropoda
- Subclass: Caenogastropoda
- Order: Neogastropoda
- Superfamily: Conoidea
- Family: Cochlespiridae
- Genus: Cochlespira
- Species: C. travancorica

Binomial name
- Cochlespira travancorica (E.A. Smith, 1896)

Synonyms
- Pleurotoma (Ancistrosyrinx) travancorica E.A. Smith, 1896; Pleurotoma (Ancistrosyrinx) travancorica var. granulata E.A. Smith, 1904; Ancistrosyrinx travancorica var. granulata (E.A. Smith) Schepman, 1913; Cochlespira travancorica travancorica (E.A. Smith) Powell, 1969

= Cochlespira travancorica =

Species of gastropod

Cochlespira travancorica is a species of sea snail, a marine gastropod mollusk in the family Cochlespiridae.

== Description ==
The size of an adult shell varies between 20 mm and 40 mm.

The smooth shell is narrowly fusiform. The colour is a dull white under a thin greyish periostracum. The shell contains seven whorls. The tall teleoconch is pagoda-shaped. At about three-fourths of the whorl height, the whorls are sharply angulated and crowned by a thin lamella, which forms somewhat irregular, upward-curved, broad-based spines. Above the carina, the shoulder is concave. From the carina to the lower suture the outlines are straight but inclined inward below. The lines of growth are finely striated. The body whorl is carinate a little below the dentate periphery and tapers gradually to a long straight siphonal canal which is obliquely striated. The narrow aperture continues into the siphonal canal. The outer lip is slender . The broad and deep sinus is profoundly arcuated above the peripheral carina and extending into the suture.

== Distribution ==
This species occurs in the Indian Ocean off India and Mozambique.
