= Cochlespira cavalier =

Scientific classification
- Kingdom: Animalia
- Phylum: Mollusca
- Class: Gastropoda
- Subclass: Caenogastropoda
- Order: Neogastropoda
- Superfamily: Conoidea
- Family: Cochlespiridae
- Genus: Cochlespira
- Species: C. cavalier

Binomial name
- Cochlespira cavalier Garcia, 2010

Species of gastropod

Cochlespira cavalier is a species of sea snail, a marine gastropod mollusk in the family Cochlespiridae.
