= Cochlespira leeana =

Scientific classification
- Kingdom: Animalia
- Phylum: Mollusca
- Class: Gastropoda
- Subclass: Caenogastropoda
- Order: Neogastropoda
- Superfamily: Conoidea
- Family: Cochlespiridae
- Genus: Cochlespira
- Species: C. leeana

Binomial name
- Cochlespira leeana Garcia, 2010

Species of gastropod

Cochlespira leeana is a species of sea snail, a marine gastropod mollusk in the family Cochlespiridae.

== Description ==
The length of the shell attains 24 mm. The shell has 9 sharp, angular, keeled whorls with up to 20 pointed triangular spines. Crowded, weak axial spines. Color is yellowish tan with darker spiral bands on the last band. Named for Dr. Henry Lee, Jacksonville, Florida, who authored malacological publications.

== Distribution ==
This marine species occurs off Barbados and Colombia.
