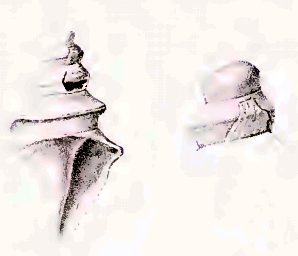
- Original drawing of a shell and its protoconch of Ancistrosyrinx clytotropis

Scientific classification
- Kingdom: Animalia
- Phylum: Mollusca
- Class: Gastropoda
- Subclass: Caenogastropoda
- Order: Neogastropoda
- Superfamily: Conoidea
- Family: Cochlespiridae
- Genus: Ancistrosyrinx
- Species: A. clytotropis

Binomial name
- Ancistrosyrinx clytotropis (Sykes, 1906)

Synonyms
- Micropleurotoma clytotropis (Sykes, 1906); Spirotropis clytotropis Sykes, 1906 (original description)

= Ancistrosyrinx clytotropis =

Species of gastropod

Ancistrosyrinx clytotropis is a species of sea snail, a marine gastropod mollusk in the family Cochlespiridae.

== Description ==
The length of the shell attains 8 mm, its diameter 4 mm.

(Original description) The elongate shell has a fusiform shape. It is pale brownish white (dead). The spire is well produced and contains five angulated and convex whorls. The protoconch consists of two whorls, large, glassy, and bulbous, smooth save for indistinct traces of microscopic spirals. The remaining whorls are strongly, angulated and carinated at the periphery. This carina appears on the later whorls as if duplex; below this carina is a second, smaller one, and two more are obscurely indicated below. The aperture is strongly angled, and the siphonal canal is spout-like and slightly twisted.

== Distribution ==
This species occurs in European waters, found at Vigo Bay, off Cape Mondego at a depth of 1980 m.
