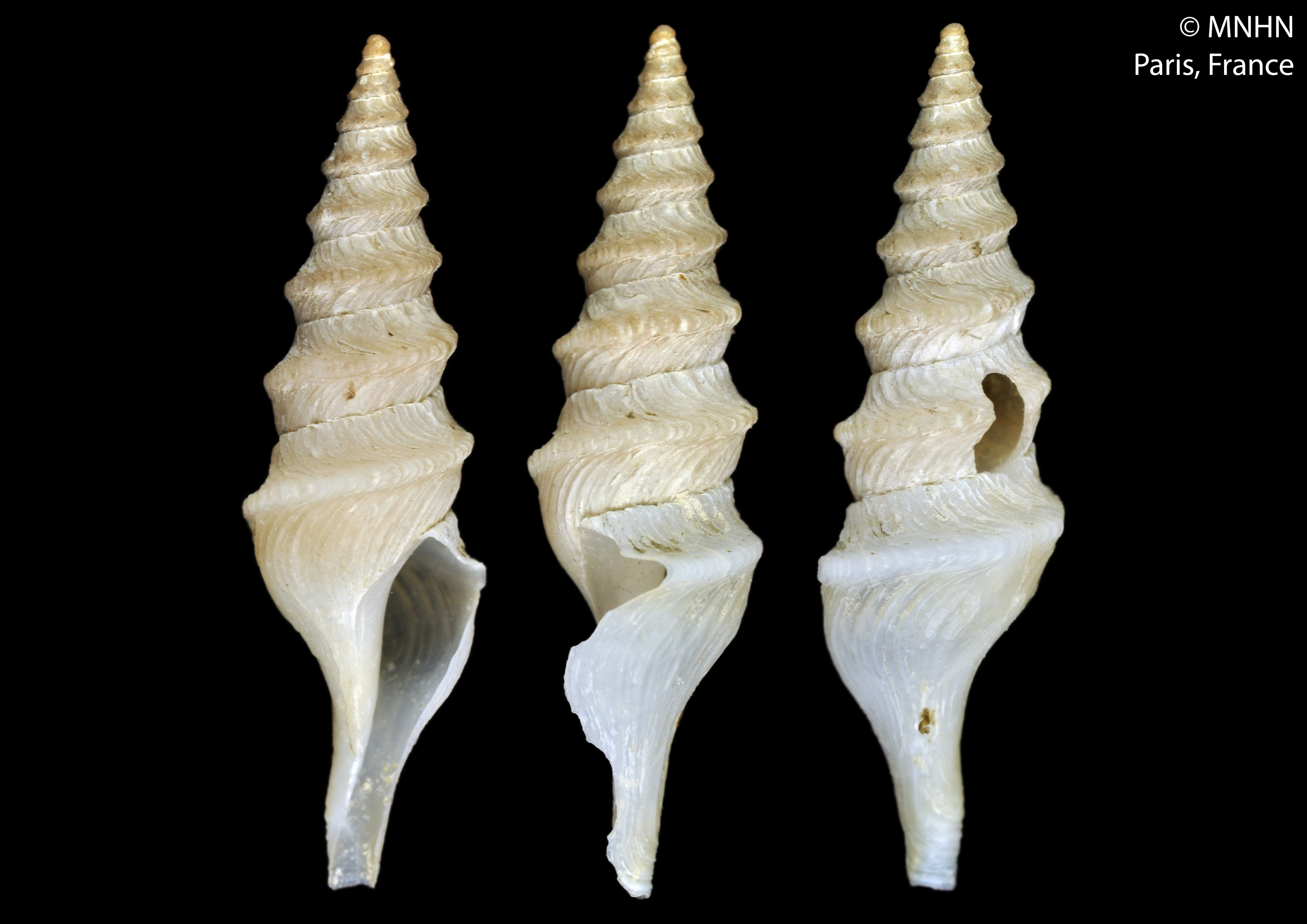
- Shell of Lucerapex cracens (holotype at MNHN, Paris)

Scientific classification
- Kingdom: Animalia
- Phylum: Mollusca
- Class: Gastropoda
- Subclass: Caenogastropoda
- Order: Neogastropoda
- Superfamily: Conoidea
- Family: Turridae
- Genus: Lucerapex; Wenz, 1943

Type species
- Pleurotoma casearia Hedley & Petterd, 1906

Species
- See text

Synonyms
- Mitromorpha (Lovellona) Iredale, 1917

= Lucerapex =

Genus of gastropods

Lucerapex is a genus of sea snails, marine gastropod mollusks in the family Turridae, the turrids.

== Distribution ==
This marine genus has a wide Indo-West Pacific distribution. Fossils have been in Quaternary strata on Timor and Indonesia and Miocene strata in South Australia and New Zealand

== Species ==
Species within the genus Lucerapex include:

- Lucerapex adenica Powell, 1964
- Lucerapex carola (Thiele, 1925)
- Lucerapex casearia (Hedley & Petterd, 1906)
- Lucerapex cracens Kantor, Fedosov & Puillandre, 2018
- Lucerapex denticulata (Thiele, 1925)
- Lucerapex indagatoris (Finlay H.J., 1927)
- Lucerapex laevicarinata Kantor, Fedosov & Puillandre, 2018
- † Lucerapex murndaliana (Tenison Woods, 1879)
- † Lucerapex pulcherrimus (Vella, 1954)
- † Lucerapex raulini (Peyrot, 1931)
- Lucerapex schepmani Shuto, 1970

Species brought into synonymy

- Lucerapex angustatus (Powell, 1940): synonym of Kuroshioturris angustata (Powell, 1940)
- Lucerapex laevicarinatus Kantor, Fedosov & Puillandre, 2018: synonym of Lucerapex laevicarinata Kantor, Fedosov & Puillandre, 2018 (wrong gender agreement of specific epithet)
