= Lucerapex adenica =

Scientific classification
- Kingdom: Animalia
- Phylum: Mollusca
- Class: Gastropoda
- Subclass: Caenogastropoda
- Order: Neogastropoda
- Superfamily: Conoidea
- Family: Turridae
- Genus: Lucerapex
- Species: L. adenica

Binomial name
- Lucerapex adenica Powell, 1964

Species of gastropod

Lucerapex adenica is a species of sea snail, a marine gastropod mollusk in the family Turridae, the turrids.

== Description ==
The length of the shell varies between 25 mm and 32 mm.

== Distribution ==
This marine species occurs in the Gulf of Aden at depths between 270 mm to 1,080 m.
