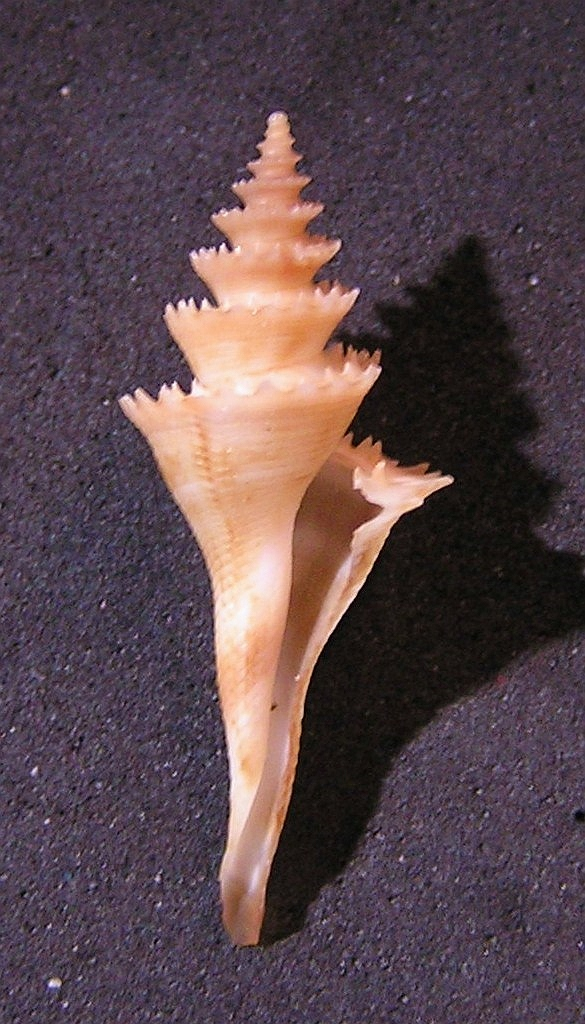
- Apertural view of a shell of Cochlespira pulchella

Scientific classification
- Kingdom: Animalia
- Phylum: Mollusca
- Class: Gastropoda
- Subclass: Caenogastropoda
- Order: Neogastropoda
- Superfamily: Conoidea
- Family: Cochlespiridae
- Genus: Cochlespira
- Species: C. pulchella

Binomial name
- Cochlespira pulchella (Schepman, 1913)

Synonyms
- Ancistrosyrinx pulchella Schepman, 1913

= Cochlespira pulchella =

Species of gastropod

Cochlespira pulchella is a species of sea snail, a marine gastropod mollusk in the family Cochlespiridae.

Subspecies

- Cochlespira pulchella fossata Powell, 1969
- Cochlespira pulchella pulchella (Schepman, 1913)
- Cochlespira pulchella semipolita Powell, 1969

== Description ==
The shell grows to a length of 25 mm, its diameter 9.5 mm.

(Original description) The strongly keeled shell is fusiformly pagodaeform. Its color is yellowish-brown, lighter on the siphonal canal, with a narrow whitish zone below the periphery and another on the fasciole. It contains 11 whorls, of which nearly 2 form a smooth, convexly-whorled nucleus. The subsequent upper whorls are nearly smooth, but with a strong keel, which is at first spinous. The spines are horizontally spreading, but soon become more or less upturned and have the character of erect trigonal spines. On the following 3 whorls they are spreading again on the body whorl. The spines number about 20 on the body whorl. The upper part of these whorls are concave. The fasciole is smooth, but for fine growth lines. This fasciole is bordered on the lower whorls by a liration, and the space between this and the spinous keel is faintly 2- or 3-lirate. The space between the keel and lower suture of the whorls is conspicuously grooved. These grooves number 10 on the penultimate whorl, about 38 on the body whorl, where some of the upper and many of the basal ones have still intermediate lirae, lacking on the penultimate and older whorls. On the last part of body whorl, the shell is still sculptured by strong growth lines, which, in crossing the interspaces or lirae between the grooves make them granulous. The body whorl is contracted below its periphery, ending in a long, straight siphonal canal, which is strongly attenuated towards its base. The aperture is elongately subtriangular, its upper margin nearly horizontal, with a deep, rather narrow sinus. The outer margin is joined to the upper one at a somewhat sharp angle, then slightly convex, thin, slightly fringed,. The columellar margin is concave along the body whorl, then running straight in the rather wide, long, nearly rectilinear canal, with a strong layer of white enamel on its whole length. The interior of the aperture is smooth, perhaps slightly grooved at its right margin.

== Distribution ==
This species occurs in the Pacific Ocean along Indonesia and the Philippines.
