= Cochlespira kuroharai =

Scientific classification
- Kingdom: Animalia
- Phylum: Mollusca
- Class: Gastropoda
- Subclass: Caenogastropoda
- Order: Neogastropoda
- Superfamily: Conoidea
- Family: Cochlespiridae
- Genus: Cochlespira
- Species: C. kuroharai

Binomial name
- Cochlespira kuroharai (Kuroda, 1959)

Synonyms
- Ancistrosyrinx kuroharai Kuroda, 1959

Species of gastropod

Cochlespira kuroharai is a species of sea snail, a marine gastropod mollusk in the family Cochlespiridae, the turrids.

== Description ==
The length of the shell attains 31 mm, its width 11.2 mm and contains 10 whorls. The elongate fusiform spire is rather broadly conical with a prominent granulose basal keel and a heavier, rounded peripheral keel above one third of the height of the whorl. The siphonal canal is long and straight.

== Distribution ==
This species occurs in the Pacific Ocean off Japan and the Philippines.
