= Cochlespira pulcherrissima =

Scientific classification
- Kingdom: Animalia
- Phylum: Mollusca
- Class: Gastropoda
- Subclass: Caenogastropoda
- Order: Neogastropoda
- Superfamily: Conoidea
- Family: Cochlespiridae
- Genus: Cochlespira
- Species: C. pulcherrissima

Binomial name
- Cochlespira pulcherrissima (Kira, 1955)

Synonyms
- Ancistrosyrinx pulcherrissima Kira, 1955; Cochlespira pulchella pulcherrissima (Kira, T., 1955)

Species of gastropod

Cochlespira pulcherrissima is a species of sea snail, a marine gastropod mollusk in the family Cochlespiridae.

== Description ==
The size of an adult shell varies between 27 mm and 36 mm. They are non-broadcast spawners.

== Distribution ==
This species occurs in the Pacific Ocean off Japan, Taiwan and the Philippines. They are typically found in the benthic zone.
