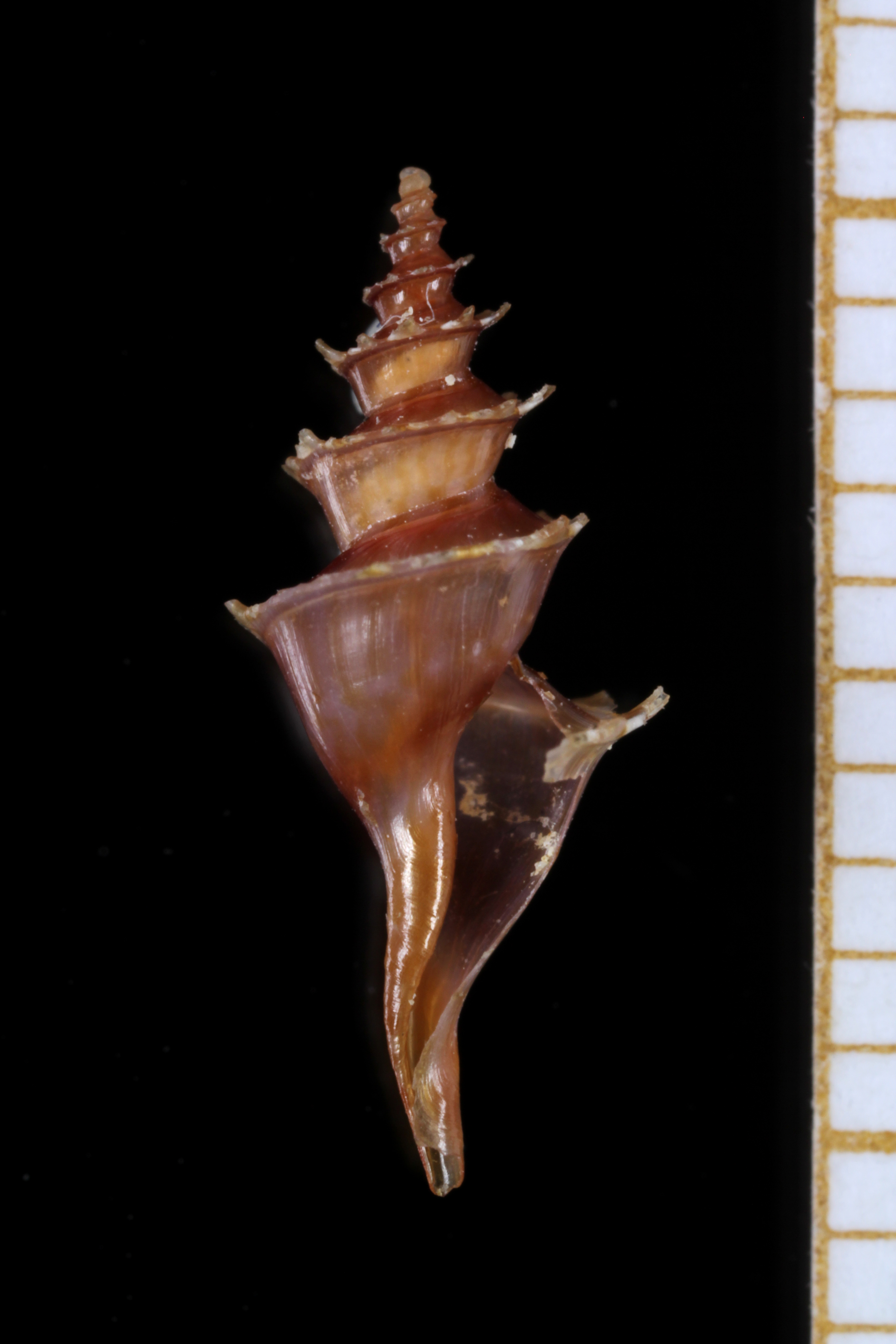
- Shell of Thatcheriasyrinx orientis

Scientific classification
- Kingdom: Animalia
- Phylum: Mollusca
- Class: Gastropoda
- Subclass: Caenogastropoda
- Order: Neogastropoda
- Superfamily: Conoidea
- Family: Raphitomidae
- Genus: Thatcheriasyrinx; Powell, 1969

Type species
- Ancistrosyrinx orientis Melvill, 1904

Species
- See text

= Thatcheriasyrinx =

Genus of gastropods

Thatcheriasyrinx is a genus of sea snails, marine gastropod mollusks in the family Raphitomidae.

== Species ==
Species within the genus Thatcheriasyrinx include:

- Thatcheriasyrinx orientis (Melvill, 1904)

Species brought into synonymy

- Thatcheriasyrinx orientalis Melvill, 1904: synonym of Thatcheriasyrinx orientis (Melvill, 1904)
