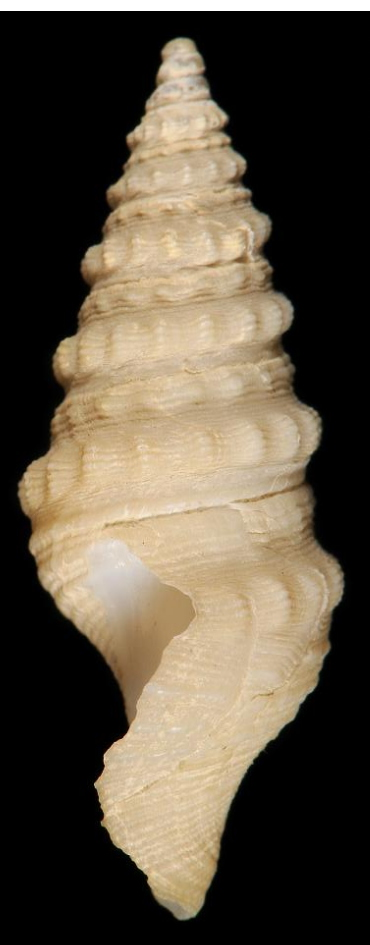
- Shell of Kuroshioturris angustata (specimen at the Smithsonian Institution)

Scientific classification
- Kingdom: Animalia
- Phylum: Mollusca
- Class: Gastropoda
- Subclass: Caenogastropoda
- Order: Neogastropoda
- Superfamily: Conoidea
- Family: Turridae
- Genus: Kuroshioturris
- Species: K. angustata

Binomial name
- Kuroshioturris angustata (Powell, 1940)

Synonyms
- Lucerapex angustatus (Powell, 1940); Micantapex angustatus Powell, 1940 (original combination); Pleurotoma (Hemipleurotoma) nodilirata Murdoch & Suter 1906 in part

= Kuroshioturris angustata =

Species of gastropod

Kuroshioturris angustata is a species of sea snail, a marine gastropod mollusk in the family Turridae, the turrids.

== Description ==
The length of the shell attains 16.5 mm.

== Distribution ==
This marine species is endemic to New Zealand and occurs at depths between 30 m to 300 m. all around northern and eastern New Zealand. It is also known as a fossil in Mangapanian strata or earliest Nukumaruan strata.
