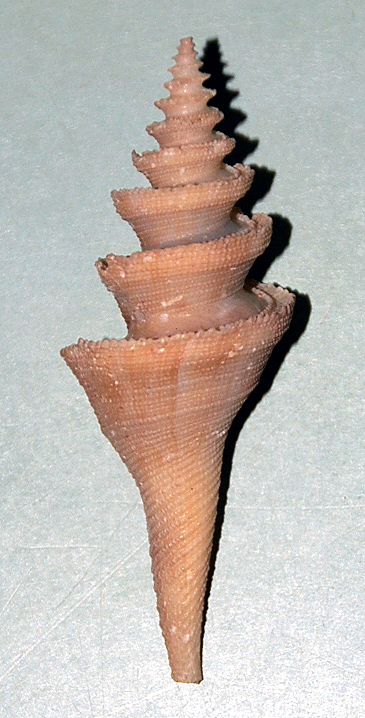

Scientific classification
- Kingdom: Animalia
- Phylum: Mollusca
- Class: Gastropoda
- Subclass: Caenogastropoda
- Order: Neogastropoda
- Superfamily: Conoidea
- Family: Cochlespiridae
- Genus: Cochlespira
- Species: C. elegans

Binomial name
- Cochlespira elegans (W. H. Dall, 1881)

Synonyms
- Ancistrosyrinx elegans Dall, 1881

= Cochlespira elegans =

Species of gastropod

Cochlespira elegans, common name the elegant star turrid, is a species of sea snail, a marine gastropod mollusk in the family Cochlespiridae.

== Description ==
The size of an adult shell varies between 35 mm and 60 mm. The white shell is acutely tapering before and behind. The long and straight siphonal canal has about the same length as the spire. There are nine whorls of which two are embryonic. The aperture is very long and narrow. The anterior surface of the whorls are everywhere sculptured with even uniform spiral rows of rounded nodules, beautifully reticulated by the lines of growth. One row about the middle of the whorl is slightly elevated above the others. The carina is fringed with delicate triangular points. The posterior surface of the whorls, except for lines of growth, is smooth, with one row of nodules just inside the carina. The columella is not thickened, but somewhat twisted anteriorly. The outer lip is sharply angulated by the carina.

== Distribution ==
This species occurs in the Caribbean Sea, the Gulf of Mexico and the Greater Antilles. The light brown shell illustrated here was recovered via Johnson Sea-Link II submersible operating at 300–400 metres depth, off West coast Barbados, Lesser Antilles.
