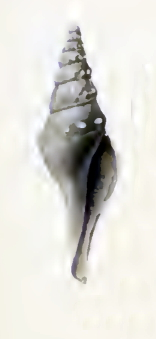
- Shutonia variabilis

Scientific classification
- Kingdom: Animalia
- Phylum: Mollusca
- Class: Gastropoda
- Subclass: Caenogastropoda
- Order: Neogastropoda
- Superfamily: Conoidea
- Family: Pseudomelatomidae
- Genus: Shutonia van der Bijl, 1993

Type species
- Surcula variabilis Schepman, 1913

Species
- See text

Synonyms
- Schepmania Shuto, 1970 (Invalid: junior homonym of Schepmania F. Haas, 1910 [Bivalvia]; Shutonia is a replacement name)

= Shutonia =

Genus of gastropods

Shutonia is a genus of sea snails, marine gastropod mollusks in the family Pseudomelatomidae, the turrids and allies.

This genus has become a synonym of Sibogasyrinx A. W. B. Powell, 1969

== Species ==
Species within the genus Shutonia include:

- Shutonia variabilis (Schepman, 1913): synonym of Sibogasyrinx variabilis (Schepman, 1913)
