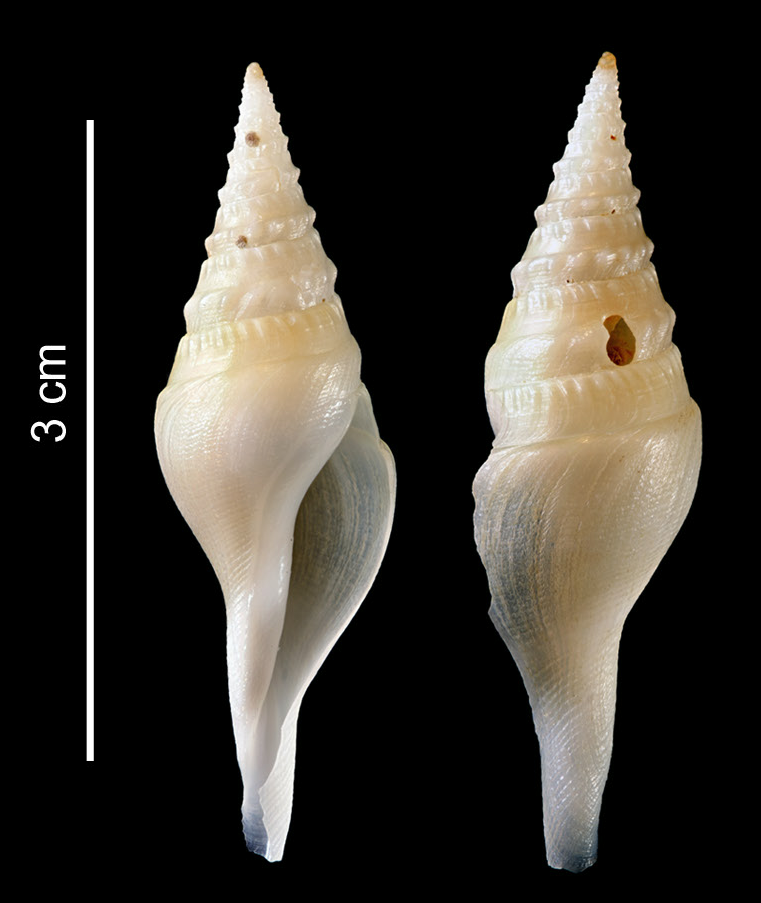
- Shell of Sibogasyrinx filosa (holotype at MNHN, Paris)

Scientific classification
- Kingdom: Animalia
- Phylum: Mollusca
- Class: Gastropoda
- Subclass: Caenogastropoda
- Order: Neogastropoda
- Superfamily: Conoidea
- Family: Cochlespiridae
- Genus: Sibogasyrinx
- Species: S. lolae

Binomial name
- Sibogasyrinx lolae Kantor & Puillandre, 2021

= Sibogasyrinx lolae =

Species of gastropod

Sibogasyrinx lolae is a species of sea snail, a marine gastropod mollusc in the family Cochlespiridae.

== Description ==
The length of the shell attains 52 mm, its diameter 13.5 mm.

(Original description) The shell (holotype) is moderately thick, glossy, and generally robust, although the outer lip of the aperture is very fragile and partly broken. It is narrowly fusiform, with a high spire and a long, narrow, straight siphonal canal.

The protoconch is small, globose, and corroded in the holotype, consisting of about 1.5 whorls. In a better-preserved juvenile specimen, the protoconch comprises just over 1.5 strongly convex whorls with a micro-shagreened surface. The transition from protoconch to teleoconch is indistinct and is marked by the appearance of axial ribs. The protoconch measures 1.0 mm in diameter and 0.74 mm in height.

The spire whorls are angled at the shoulder, whereas the body whorl has a less pronounced angulation. The teleoconch comprises just under eight whorls. The suture is shallowly impressed on the body whorl but becomes distinctly deeper on the spire whorls. The subsutural ramp is moderately broad, weakly concave on the upper teleoconch whorls, and nearly flat on the penultimate and last whorls. It bears distinct prosocline axial wrinkles that extend from the suture to approximately the upper two-thirds of the ramp. These number 22–23 on the first and second whorls, 24 on the penultimate whorl, and 31 on the body whorl. Spiral sculpture is absent on the upper four whorls but appears later as indistinct spiral cords, with three present on the body whorl.

The shoulder of the teleoconch whorls, except for the last, carries a row of distinct nodules that are elongated in an opisthocline direction and intersected by weak spiral cords. There are 17 nodules on the first teleoconch whorl and 18 on both the antepenultimate and penultimate whorls. Weak spiral cords occur on and below the shoulder, appearing from the third teleoconch whorl onward and becoming about twice as broad below the shoulder. The penultimate whorl bears four cords on the shoulder and four below it. On the body whorl, the shoulder is smooth, but approximately 55 spiral cords are present below it, of which about 25 extend onto the siphonal canal. These cords are weak, slightly wavy, and closely spaced, with interspaces approximately half the width of the cords.

The shell base tapers gradually into the long, narrow, nearly straight siphonal canal. The aperture is narrow and posteriorly constricted, with a very thin and narrow parietal callus. The outer lip, which is badly broken, is distinctly indented at the shoulder, weakly convex below the shoulder, and shallowly concave at the transition to the siphonal canal. The anal sinus, as inferred from the growth lines, is shallow, subsutural in position, and broadly arcuate, merging with the forward extension of the outer lip.

The shell is very light yellowish in colour; the protoconch is very light tan in the holotype and light brown in the comparative specimen.

The anatomy, based on a single male specimen, shows a penis with an obliquely truncated tip bearing a long and very narrow papilla, which is surrounded by a circular fold much wider than the papilla itself. The proboscis is conical and moderately long, with a broad base and an anterior half that rapidly tapers toward the tip. The proboscis retractors are well defined, forming two symmetrical lateral bundles attached to the inner walls of the proboscis at the boundary of its posterior third. The buccal mass contains a small radular sac, and the odontophore lies within the broader posterior portion of the proboscis; it is elongate-oval and occupies slightly less than half the length of the proboscis. A single small accessory salivary gland is present, and the salivary glands themselves are separate, acinous, and irregular in shape. The venom gland is long, moderately thick, and convoluted, and it opens into the oesophagus within the nerve ring.

The radula, also based on a single specimen, is short and comprises 28 rows of teeth, including 13 nascent rows. It measures 1.15 mm in length (7.9% of the aperture length without the canal) and up to 255 µm in width (1.8% of the aperture length without the canal); individual teeth reach 160 µm in length (1.10% of the aperture length without the canal). The central tooth has a subrectangular basal plate with distinct margins and a long, narrow, sharply pointed cusp. Its anterior margin is overlapped by the preceding row, while the posterior margin consists of two straight sections that meet at an obtuse angle along the midline. The marginal teeth are initially flat when formed, become trough-shaped with slightly thickened edges during maturation, and fold longitudinally when fully developed, with both margins overlapping at the tip. The resulting mature tooth is moderately broad, with a sharp point and a narrow slit along the anterior edge between the folded margins. In the specimen examined, the folding of the teeth occurs at approximately the fifteenth row.

== Distribution ==
This marine species was found off the Solomon Islands, the Coral Sea and Southern New Caledonia. (depth range:460 – 787 m.).
