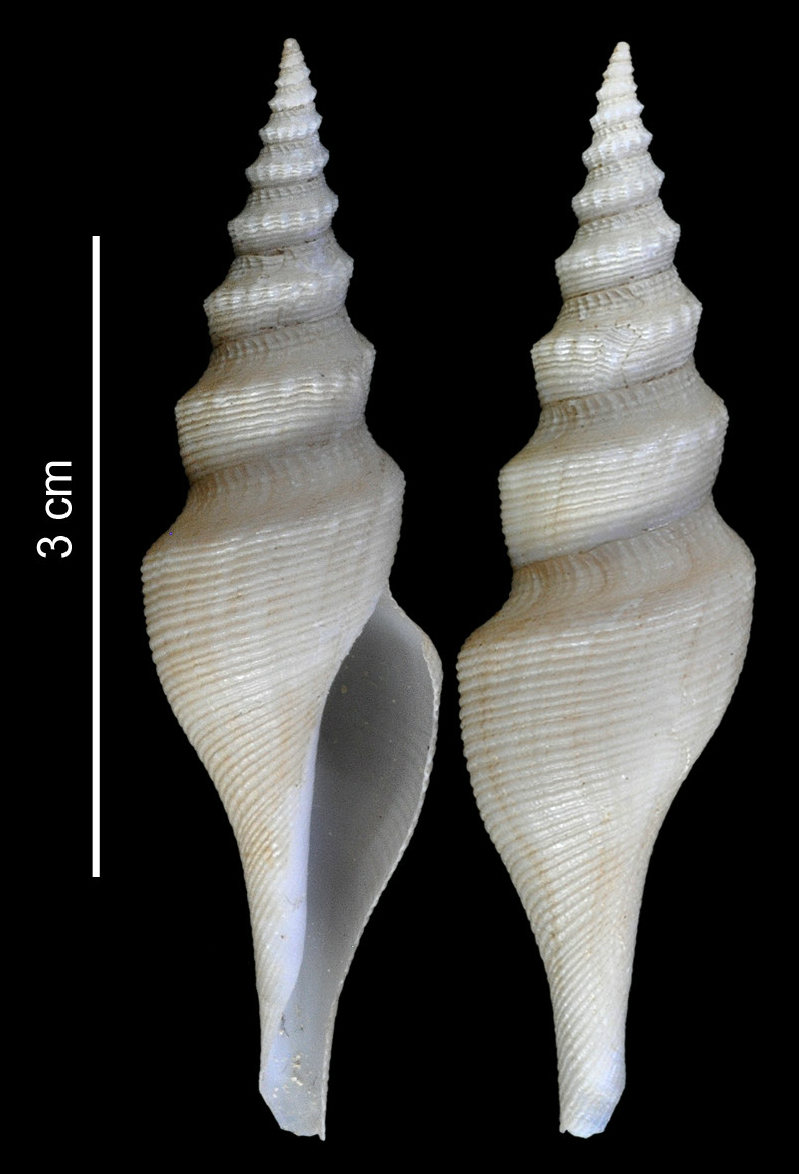
- Shell of Sibogasyrinx filosa (holotype at MNHN, Paris)

Scientific classification
- Kingdom: Animalia
- Phylum: Mollusca
- Class: Gastropoda
- Subclass: Caenogastropoda
- Order: Neogastropoda
- Superfamily: Conoidea
- Family: Cochlespiridae
- Genus: Sibogasyrinx
- Species: S. filosa

Binomial name
- Sibogasyrinx filosa Ardovini, 2021

Synonyms
- Sibogasyrinx filosus Ardovini, 2021 (wrong gender agreement of specific epithet)

= Sibogasyrinx filosa =

Species of gastropod

Sibogasyrinx filosa is a species of sea snail, a marine gastropod mollusc in the family Cochlespiridae.

== Description ==
The length of the shell attains 52 mm, its diameter 13.5 mm.

(Original description) The shell is moderately thick and generally strong, except for the outer lip of the aperture, which is fragile and often partially broken. It is narrowly fusiform in shape, with a high spire and a long, narrow, nearly straight siphonal canal.

The protoconch is small and globose, consisting of just over 1.5 strongly convex whorls with a micro-shagreened surface. The transition to the teleoconch is indistinct and is marked primarily by the ظهور of a shoulder carina. The protoconch measures 0.89 mm in diameter and 0.72 mm in height.

The spire whorls are strongly angled at the shoulder, whereas the body whorl has a more rounded shoulder. The teleoconch comprises just under nine whorls in the largest specimen. The suture is shallowly impressed on the last whorl but becomes distinctly deeper on the spire whorls. The subsutural ramp is moderately broad and strongly concave. The subsutural region bears a row of distinct, narrow axial ribs that are confluent with the growth lines and form small nodules at their intersections with spiral cords. These ribs are absent on most of the first teleoconch whorl, number about twenty on the second and third whorls, approximately thirty-five on the penultimate whorl, and about forty-five on the body whorl.

Spiral cords appear on the subsutural ramp from the second whorl onward and become well developed by the fourth whorl. The last three whorls bear four to five distinct cords on the subsutural ramp, with intervals equal to the width of the cords, followed below the shoulder by five to seven narrower, closely spaced cords. The shoulder carries a row of pronounced, rounded nodules that are more distinct on the upper teleoconch whorls and absent on the body whorl; there are about fifteen to seventeen such nodules on the penultimate and antepenultimate whorls.

In addition to the cords on the subsutural ramp, the spiral sculpture consists of numerous distinct, narrow cords covering the entire shell surface, including the shoulder nodules. On the body whorl, there are approximately forty-five cords below the shoulder, of which about twenty-five extend onto the siphonal canal. These cords are weakly rounded or flat-topped, and their interspaces are usually narrower than the cords themselves, only rarely equal to or slightly wider than them. The shell base tapers gradually into the long, narrow, almost straight siphonal canal.

The aperture is narrow and posteriorly constricted, with a very thin and narrow parietal callus. The outer lip shows a rounded angle at the shoulder, is weakly convex below the shoulder, and becomes weakly concave at the transition to the siphonal canal. The anal sinus is moderately deep, subsutural in position, and broadly arcuate, merging with the pronounced forward extension of the outer lip.

The shell is light orange, with a paler middle portion on the body whorl; in sequenced specimens, it appears off-white with a very pale yellowish subsutural ramp and irregular darker blotches in that region. The protoconch is light tan.

The anatomy, based on a single specimen, shows a head with moderately long, conical tentacles that have rounded tips and closely spaced bases; large eyes are situated on small lobes at the tentacle bases. The proboscis is conical and moderately long, with a broad base that rapidly narrows toward the tip. The proboscis retractors are not well defined, and the posterior part of the very thin proboscis sheath is only weakly muscular. The buccal mass is very large and broad, located posterior to the base of the proboscis, and constitutes about half the length of the proboscis. The oesophagus forms a very short loop before passing through the nerve ring.

The radular sac contains a small odontophore and opens dorso-laterally on the right side of the buccal mass. The venom gland is thick, moderately long, and convoluted, and it opens into the oesophagus within the nerve ring. The muscular bulb is moderately large, elongated, and folded posteriorly. The salivary glands are fused, relatively large, irregular in shape, and acinous; a small, ovate accessory salivary gland is situated dorsally at the level of the nerve ring.

The radula, also based on a single specimen, is relatively short and consists of 41 rows of teeth, of which 15 are nascent. It measures 1.55 mm in length, corresponding to 12% of the aperture length without the siphonal canal, and reaches a maximum width of 225 µm (1.8% of the aperture length without the canal). The central tooth has a subrectangular basal plate with distinct margins and a moderately long cusp; its anterior margin is overlapped by the preceding row, while the posterior margin is evenly and weakly rounded. The marginal teeth are initially flat when formed, become trough-shaped with slightly thickened edges during maturation, and are folded longitudinally when fully developed, with both margins overlapping at the tip. The resulting mature tooth is moderately broad, with a sharp, pointed tip and a narrow slit along the anterior edge between the folded margins.

== Distribution ==
This marine species was found off New Ireland and the Solomon Islands and the Philippines (depth range: 150 - 1100 m.).
