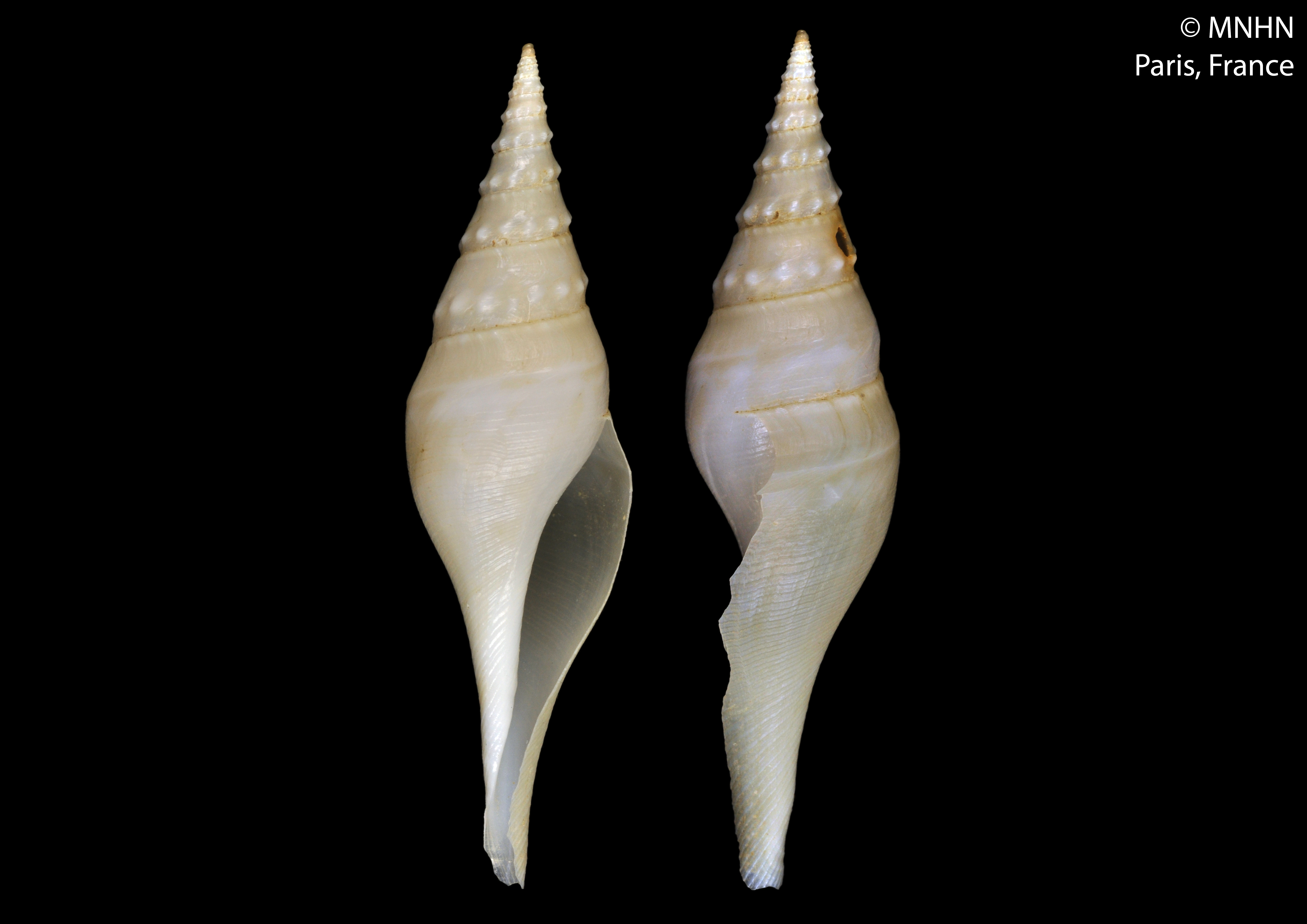
- Shell of Sibogasyrinx sangeri (holotype at MNHN, Paris)

Scientific classification
- Kingdom: Animalia
- Phylum: Mollusca
- Class: Gastropoda
- Subclass: Caenogastropoda
- Order: Neogastropoda
- Superfamily: Conoidea
- Family: Cochlespiridae
- Genus: Sibogasyrinx
- Species: S. sangeri

Binomial name
- Sibogasyrinx sangeri Kantor, Fedosov & Puillandre, 2018

= Sibogasyrinx sangeri =

Species of gastropod

Sibogasyrinx sangeri is a species of sea snail, a marine gastropod mollusc in the family Cochlespiridae.

== Description ==
The length of the shell attains 54.1 mm.

(Original description) The thin, fragile shell is variable in shape, from narrowly fusiform to moderately broad. It has a rather high spire and a long, narrow, straight siphonal canal.

The protoconch is small and globose,and consists of 1.75 strongly convex, micro-shagreened whorls. The protoconch/teleoconch transition is indistinct. The diameter of the protoconch measures about 1.1 mm, its height 1.2 mm.

The early teleoconch whorls are angular, usually in the lower part just above the suture, but sometimes at mid-whorl. The body whorl is strongly to very weakly angled or evenly rounded, even in specimens of the same size. The teleoconch consists of up to 10 whorls. The suture is shallow. The subsutural ramp shows a row of distinct, closely spaced nodules, 10 on the first whorl, 14 on the second whorl, becoming more broadly spaced and less discernible on later whorls, sometimes obsolete on the body whorl of the largest specimens. The subsutural zone is very weakly concave, nearly straight on the penultimate and the last whorls, smooth except for a few irregularly spaced and indistinct spiral threads (sometimes oblique), or several rather pronounced flattened spiral cords. The lower part of the whorls contains a row of larger, more pronounced nodules, just above the suture in upper whorls or sometimes nearer mid-whorl. In some specimens nodules are absent on the body whorl. The body whorl may bear a low carina at its periphery (in specimens with nodules absent), giving it very weakly angled outline. Below the periphery 2–3 distinct spiral cords on the penultimate whorl and about 30 cords below the carina on the body whorl and 20 on the siphonal canal. The base of the shell gradually narrows towards a long, nearly straight siphonal canal.

The aperture is narrow, constricted posteriorly with a broad, very thin parietal callus. The outer lip is partially broken. It is convex and weakly angled in its upper part and slightly convex below the shoulder, and shallowly concave at transition to the siphonal canal. The anal sinusis moderately deep, subsutural, broadly arcuate, growth lines confluent with large forward extension of the outer lip. The growth lines are thin but distinct.

The shell is uniformly off-white, the protoconch light tan.

Anatomy: The proboscis is of moderate length in contracted stage, with the buccal mass situated outside the proboscis. The oesophagus is very broad, forming a short loop before passing through the nerve ring. The venom gland opens into the oesophagus ventrally and immediately posterior to the nerve ring.

Radula: Relatively short, comprising ca 40 rows of teeth, with long nascent part (15–16 rows). The radula length is 2.2 mm (16% of AL without canal), width up to 365 μm (2.7% of AL without canal). The central tooth has a subrectangular basal plate, and is very shallowly arcuate anteriorly, with distinct borders and weak cusp. The marginal teeth are flat when formed, becoming trough-shaped during maturation, folded longitudinally when fully formed. On developing part of the radula, folding of teeth occurs abruptly, within one subsequent row. Folding isevident at 17th row in the radula studied. Resulting folded tooth are moderately broad, with a sharp pointed tip, formed by overlapping of both thickened margins.

== Distribution ==
This marine species was found off Papua New Guinea, the Solomon Islands and the Philippines (depth range: 448 - 788 m.).
