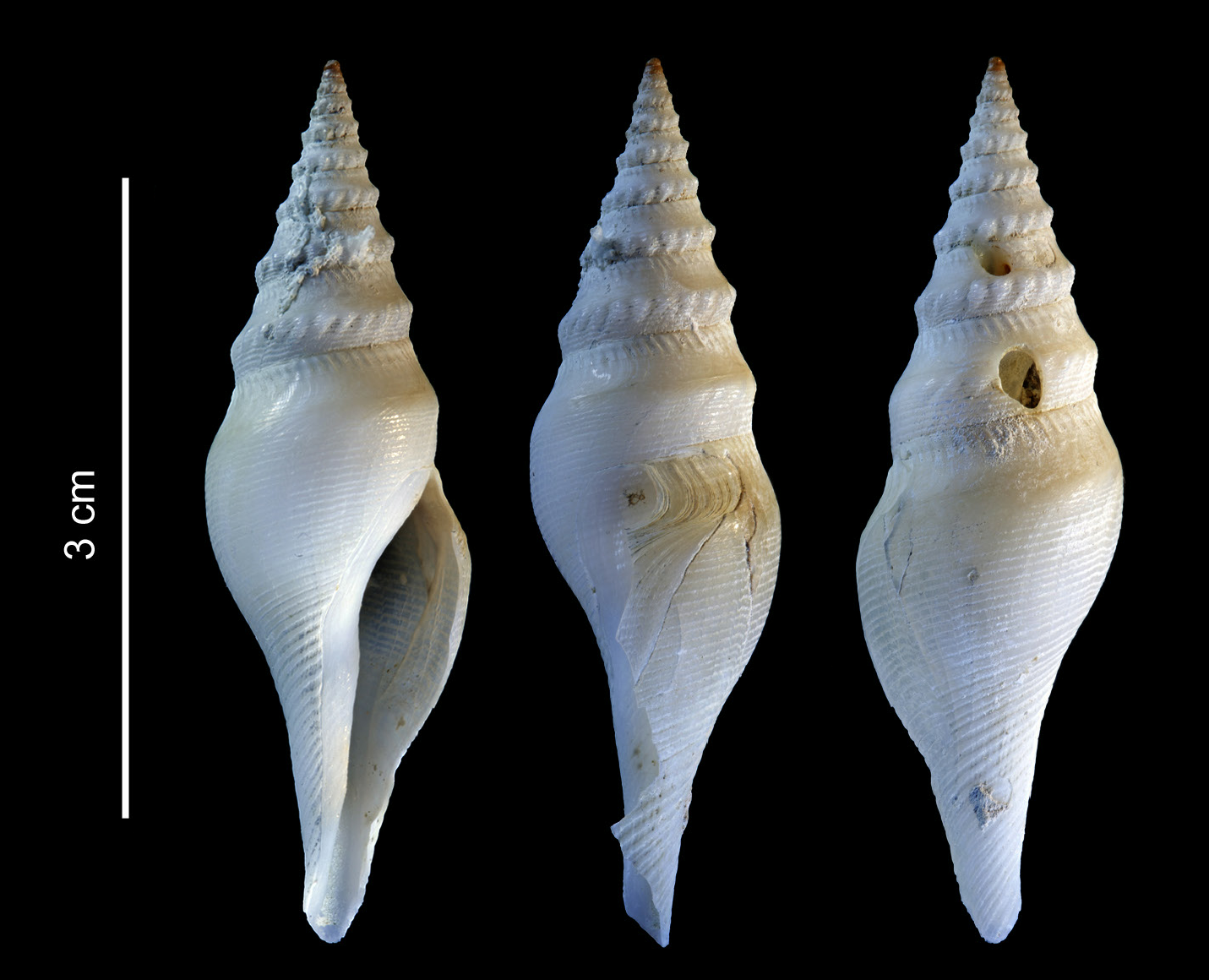
- Shell of Sibogasyrinx clausura (holotype in the MNHN, Paris)

Scientific classification
- Kingdom: Animalia
- Phylum: Mollusca
- Class: Gastropoda
- Subclass: Caenogastropoda
- Order: Neogastropoda
- Superfamily: Conoidea
- Family: Cochlespiridae
- Genus: Sibogasyrinx
- Species: S. clausura

Binomial name
- Sibogasyrinx clausura Kantor & Puillandre, 2021

= Sibogasyrinx clausura =

Species of gastropod

Sibogasyrinx clausura is a species of sea snail, a marine gastropod mollusc in the family Cochlespiridae.

== Description ==
The length of the shell attains 41.4 mm, its diameter 12.4 mm.

(Original description) The shell (holotype) is moderately thick and slightly glossy, and it is strong except for the fragile, partially broken outer lip of the aperture. It is narrowly fusiform, with a high spire and a moderately long, straight siphonal canal.

The protoconch is small and globose, consisting of about 1.5 strongly convex, eroded whorls. The transition from protoconch to teleoconch is marked by a strongly arcuate axial rib that matches the course of the growth lines, followed by ten thinner and weaker axial ribs and rather thickened growth lines. The protoconch measures 1.0 mm in diameter and 0.84 mm in height.

The spire whorls are distinctly angled at the shoulder, whereas the shoulder on the body whorl is scarcely discernible. The teleoconch comprises just over eight whorls in total. The suture is shallowly impressed, and the subsutural ramp is broad and concave, becoming weakly concave on the last whorl. The subsutural region bears a row of distinct, dense, narrow, short, prosocline axial wrinkles that correspond to the upper parts of thickened growth lines. These wrinkles extend from the suture to the upper third of the ramp and increase in number from 22 on the first whorl to 42 on the penultimate whorl and 50 on the body whorl.

Except for the last one, the teleoconch whorls bear a row of distinct, opisthocline, elongated nodules on the shoulder. These nodules extend to the abapical suture and are intersected by spiral cords, and their number increases from 13 on the first whorl to 21 on the antepenultimate and penultimate whorls. The subsutural ramp is otherwise smooth apart from the axial wrinkles described above. The spiral cords that intersect the shoulder nodules begin on the second teleoconch whorl, although corrosion makes their number unclear there, and they become progressively stronger, with seven on the antepenultimate whorl and eight on the penultimate whorl. The cords are closely spaced, with interspaces about half as wide as the cords themselves.

On the body whorl, the cords cover the entire shell surface below the indistinct shoulder, with about 40 cords in total, of which 20 are on the siphonal canal. Just below the suture, the cords are weak, slightly wavy, and very closely spaced; on the shell base and canal, the interspaces are 0.5–1.0 times the width of the cords. The shell base gradually narrows toward a narrow, nearly straight siphonal canal.

The aperture is narrow and constricted posteriorly, with a narrow, moderately thick parietal callus. The outer lip is partially broken; it is evenly convex and weakly concave at the transition to the siphonal canal. The anal sinus is shallow, subsutural, broadly arcuate, and confluent with the large forward extension of the outer lip, as deduced from the growth lines.

The shell is off-white, with a slightly darker subsutural ramp, and the protoconch is light tan. The periostracum is smooth and remains preserved between the cords and ribs.

The anatomy is that of a male. The penis is obliquely truncated at the tip and bears a short, large, conical papilla that occupies the entire anterior part of the penis and is surrounded by a circular fold. Eyes are present. The proboscis is moderately long and conical, with an expanded base. The proboscis retractors are not clearly defined, and the entire posterior part of the proboscis base is muscular. The salivary glands are small and unfused, with very long ducts that run within the walls of the oesophagus. The buccal mass is moderately large, about one-third of the proboscis length, basal, and protrudes backward beyond the proboscis base, with the radular sac lying outside the proboscis. The venom gland is very large, thick, and strongly convoluted, and it becomes very constricted before opening into the oesophagus in the region of the nerve ring. The muscular bulb is moderately large.

The radula is relatively short and comprises 38 rows of teeth, of which 16 are nascent. It measures 1.65 mm in length, corresponding to 15.5% of the aperture length excluding the siphonal canal, and it reaches up to 250 µm in width, corresponding to 2.35% of the aperture length excluding the canal. The central tooth has a basal plate with distinct anterior and lateral borders and a long, narrow, sharply pointed cusp. Its anterior margin is overlapped by the preceding row, and its posterior margin is almost evenly rounded except for a narrow protrusion adjoining the cusp. The marginal teeth are flat when formed, become trough-shaped with weakly thickened edges during maturation, and fold longitudinally when fully formed, with both margins overlapping at the tooth tip. The resulting folded tooth is moderately broad and sharply pointed, and the boundary between the two margins appears as a narrow groove along the anterior edge. Tooth folding begins in the 15th to 16th row from the rear.

== Distribution ==
This marine species occurs off the Solomon Islands, New South Wales (Australia) and on the Coriolis Bank in the Coral Sea at depths between 762 m and 1060 m.
