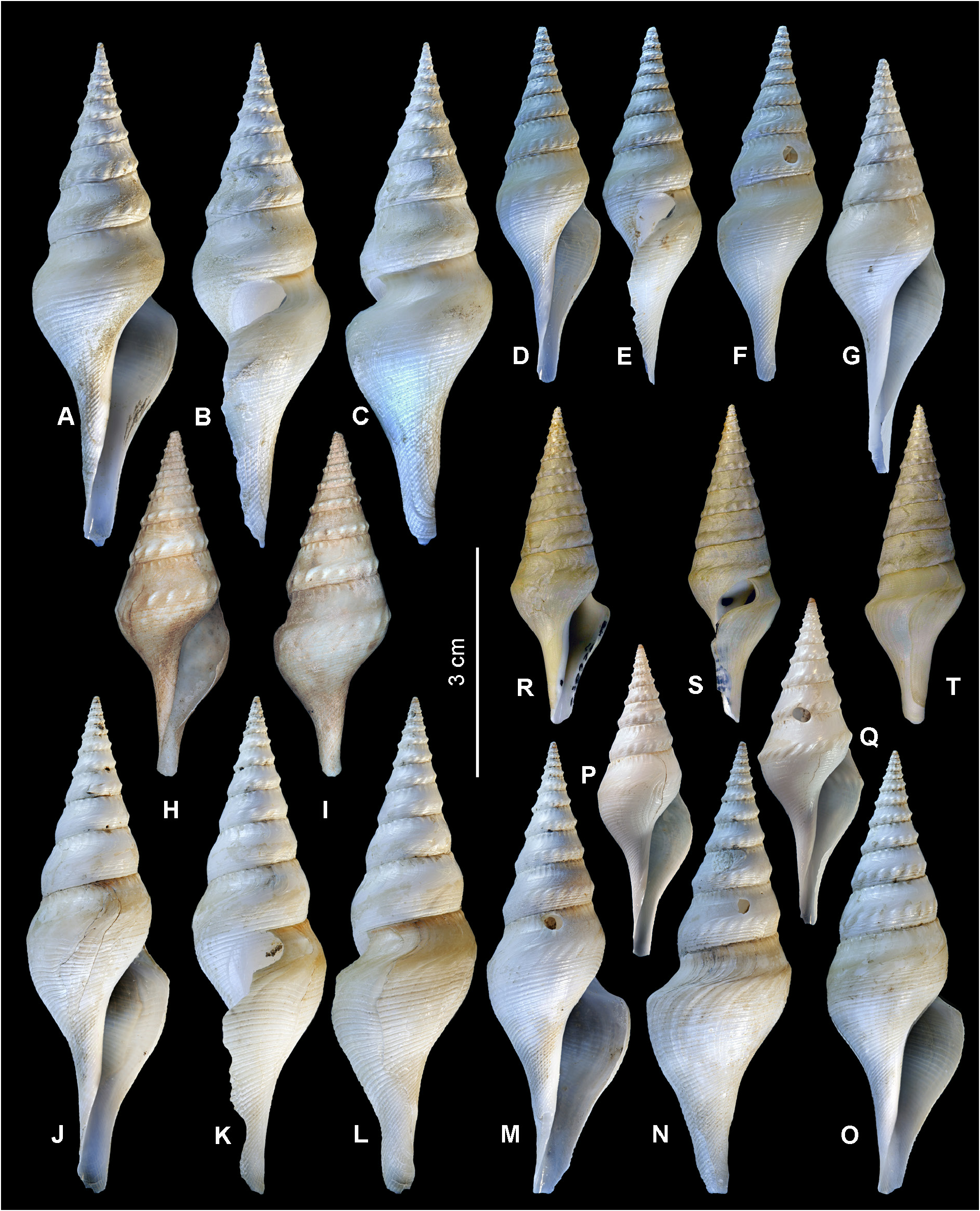
- Sibogasyrinx pyramidalis (Schepman, 1913) complex. A–G. Sibogasyrinx cf. pyramidalis 1. A–C. South China Sea, MNHN-IM-2013-44605, SL 65.2 mm. D–F. Philippines, MNHN- IM-2009-13451, SL 46.8 mm. G. South China Sea, MNHN-IM-2013-44574, SL 53.9 mm. H–I. Surcula pyramidalis Schepman, 1913, holotype, ZMA.MOLL.136836, SL 45 mm (photos by K. Hasegawa, copyright Naturalis, Leiden). J–Q. Sibogasyrinx cf. pyramidalis 2, Papua New Guinea. J–L. MNHN- IM-2013-19745, SL 65.2 mm. M–O. MNHN-IM-2009-17000, SL 59.2 mm. P. MNHN-IM-2009-16973, SL 41 mm. Q. MNHN-IM-2009-16988, SL 43 mm. R–T. Sibogasyrinx archibenthalis (Powell, 1969), holotype, USNM 238773, SL 41.8 mm. All shells to same scale.
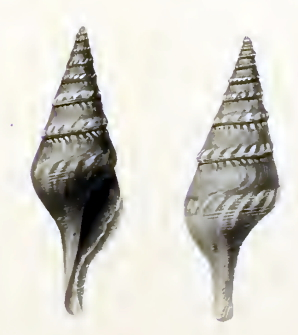
- Original image of a shell of Sibogasyrinx pyramidalis

Scientific classification
- Kingdom: Animalia
- Phylum: Mollusca
- Class: Gastropoda
- Subclass: Caenogastropoda
- Order: Neogastropoda
- Superfamily: Conoidea
- Family: Cochlespiridae
- Genus: Sibogasyrinx
- Species: S. pyramidalis

Binomial name
- Sibogasyrinx pyramidalis (Schepman, 1913)

Synonyms
- Leucosyrinx pyramidalis (Schepman, 1913); Surcula pyramidalis Schepman, 1913 (original combination)

= Sibogasyrinx pyramidalis =

Species of sea snail

Sibogasyrinx pyramidalis is a species of sea snail, a marine gastropod mollusk in the family Cochlespiridae.

== Taxonomy ==
The present molecular analysis revealed that there are two molecularly distinct but morphologically cryptic species that match the description and illustrations of the holotype of S. pyramidalis (Schepman, 1913). The specimens collected from Luzon Island (Philippines) and in the central South China Sea display significant shell variability with the specimens collected from the Bismarck Sea.

== Description ==
The length of the shell attains 46 mm, its diameter 15.75 mm.

(Original description by M.M. Schepman) The shell has a fusiform shape, with a strictly pyramidal spire and a rather long, slender siphonal canal. The shell is, thin, rather smooth and greyish-white. The protoconch is wanting, remaining 9 straight whorls. The straight line only interrupted by a row of short, fold-like, oblique tubercles at the lower part of the whorls, somewhat fainter near the aperture. They number 17 on the penultimate whorl. The whorls have a second row of slightly oblong, bead-like tubercles, just below the suture, about 30 in number on the body whorl. The spiral sculpture consists of impressed striae, crossing the lower half of basal row of tubercles on each whorl, and 2 or 3 just above the suture. The whole basal part of the body whorl is spirally striated or grooved, the upper part of the whorls is nearly smooth, but for a few scarcely visible spirals and fine and coarse flexuous growth-lines, becoming much coarser on the siphonal canal, which by the intercrossing of this sculpture is slightly granular. The aperture is angular above, ending below in a rather long, narrow, slightly contorted siphonal canal. The peristome is thin, wdth a wide, shallow sinus above, strongly protracted in its median part. The columellar margin is strongly contorted, with a narrow, thin layer of enamel.

== Distribution ==
This species occurs in the Pacific Ocean off Eastern Indonesia, Borneo and the Timor Sea.
