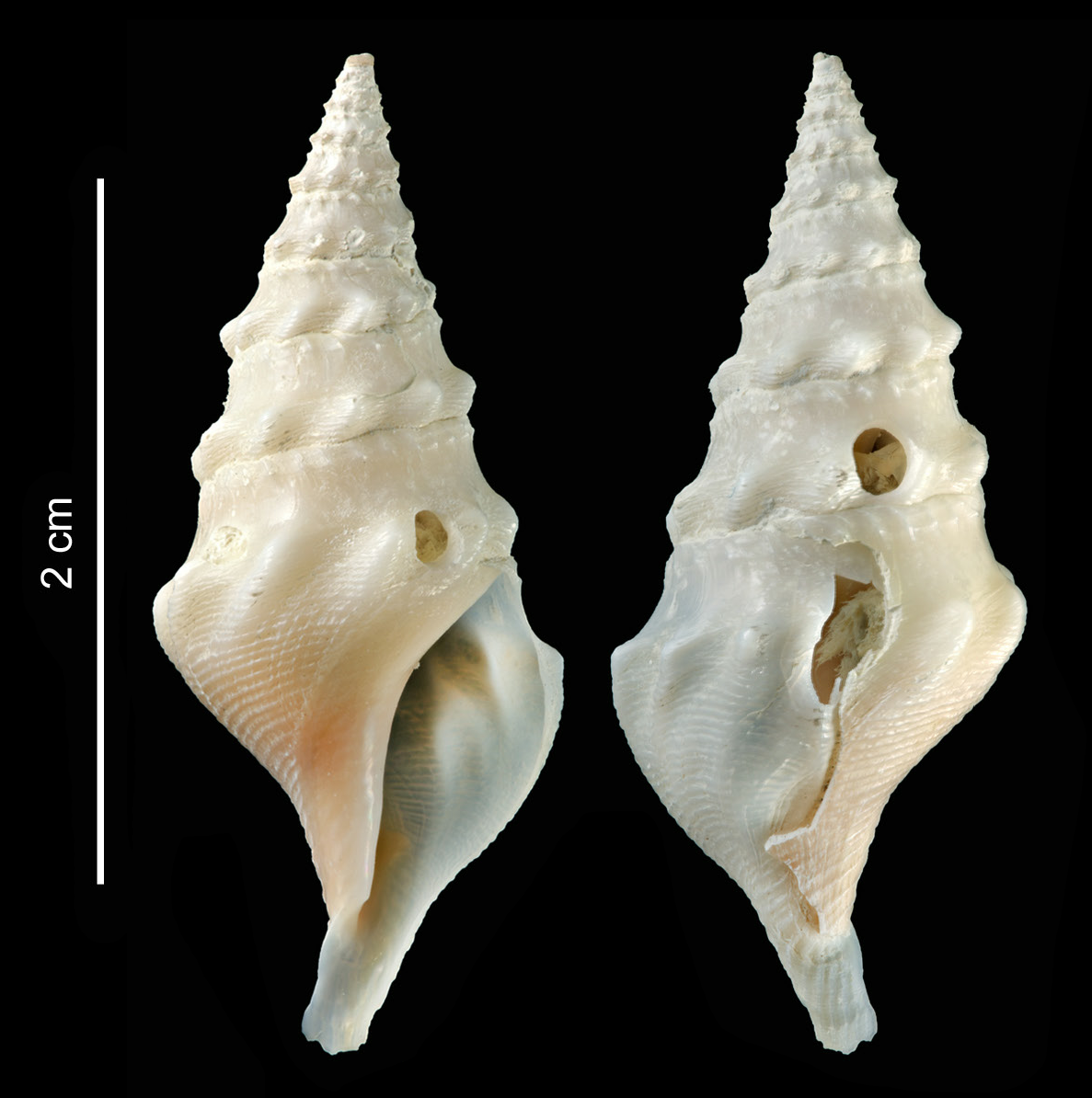
- Shell of Sibogasyrinx pagodiformis (holotype in the MNHN, Paris)

Scientific classification
- Kingdom: Animalia
- Phylum: Mollusca
- Class: Gastropoda
- Subclass: Caenogastropoda
- Order: Neogastropoda
- Superfamily: Conoidea
- Family: Cochlespiridae
- Genus: Sibogasyrinx
- Species: S. pagodiformis

Binomial name
- Sibogasyrinx pagodiformis Kantor & Puillandre, 2021

= Sibogasyrinx pagodiformis =

Species of gastropod

Sibogasyrinx pagodiformis is a species of sea snail, a marine gastropod mollusc in the family Cochlespiridae.

== Description ==
The length of the shell attains 41.4 mm, its diameter 12.4 mm.

(Original description) The shell (holotype) is moderately thick, but the outer lip of the aperture is fragile and partially chipped. It is pagodiform, with a moderately high spire and a moderately long, narrow siphonal canal that is inclined slightly abaxially to the left.

The protoconch is missing, which makes an exact whorl count and protoconch measurements impossible, and the upper teleoconch whorls are eroded.

The teleoconch whorls increase rapidly in size and are strongly angled at the shoulder, with more than eight whorls preserved. The suture is shallowly impressed, and the subsutural ramp is broad and concave. On the upper teleoconch whorls, a row of distinct, sharp subsutural nodules is present; on the last three whorls these nodules are less distinct and sit on short, slightly raised, prosocline axial ribs. Because of surface erosion, the number of ribs on the uppermost whorls cannot be determined, but the number of nodules per whorl increases from 16–17 on the first intact whorl to 22 on the penultimate whorl and 26 on the body whorl. The subsutural ramp is otherwise smooth, apart from these nodules and two low, indistinct subsutural cords.

The shoulder of all teleoconch whorls bears pronounced, thickened, opisthocline axial ribs. On the upper teleoconch whorls the ribs lie just above the suture, whereas on the last whorl they extend to the shell base. Their number is constant at 11–12 per whorl. The ribs are intersected by closely spaced, rounded spiral cords, whose number increases from five on the uppermost preserved whorl to ten on the penultimate whorl. The body whorl carries a total of 38 spiral cords, including 18 on the siphonal canal. The cords are narrow, and their interspaces are 0.5–1.5 times the cord width. The shell base narrows rapidly toward a narrow, moderately long siphonal canal. The aperture is narrow and constricted posteriorly, with a thin, moderately broad parietal callus. The outer lip is partially broken; it is convex across the subsutural ramp, forms a rounded angle at the shoulder, remains convex below the shoulder, and becomes weakly concave at the transition to the siphonal canal. Judging from the growth lines, the anal sinus is shallow, subsutural, and broadly arcuate.

The shell is flesh-coloured with a darker base and is glossy. The periostracum is thin and persists in some of the intervals between the cords.

The anatomy was examined in a female specimen. The proboscis is relatively short, straight, and cylindrical. The proboscis retractors are large and arranged in two bundles attached to the base of the proboscis. The buccal mass lies within the proboscis, is rather long (about half the proboscis length), and has the radular sac opening on the right side. The venom gland is very thick but not long and opens into the oesophagus just posterior to the nerve ring through a very short constriction. The venom bulb is moderately large and elongate.

The radula is relatively short and comprises 20–24 rows of teeth, of which 8–9 are nascent. The radula is 1.1–1.6 mm long, corresponding to 12–16% of the aperture length excluding the canal, and the teeth are about 150 µm long, corresponding to 1.7% of the aperture length excluding the canal. A central tooth is absent. The marginal teeth are trough-shaped when mature, with slightly thickened edges and sharply pointed tips. Each tooth initially forms as a flat, elongate-oval plate whose edges gradually thicken along the radular membrane, and then, beginning in the 10th–11th row from the rear, each tooth undergoes longitudinal folding to attain the final trough-shaped form.

== Distribution ==
This marine species occurs off the Solomon Islands and Vanuatu at depths between 1250 m and 1262 m.
