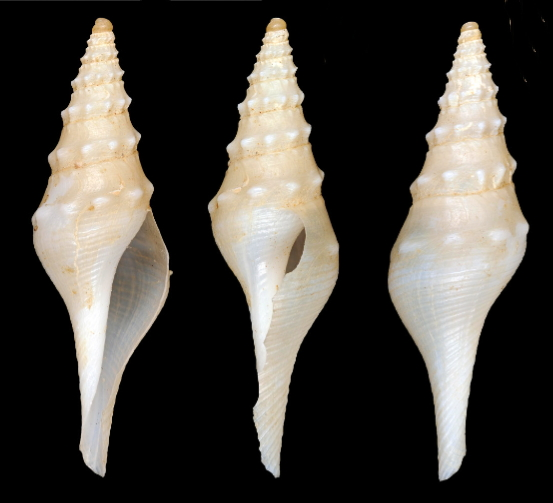
- Shell of Sibogasyrinx variabilis (lectotype at Naturalis Biodiversity Center)

Scientific classification
- Kingdom: Animalia
- Phylum: Mollusca
- Class: Gastropoda
- Subclass: Caenogastropoda
- Order: Neogastropoda
- Superfamily: Conoidea
- Family: Cochlespiridae
- Genus: Sibogasyrinx
- Species: S. variabilis

Binomial name
- Sibogasyrinx variabilis (Schepman, 1913)

Synonyms
- Comitas variabilis Powell 1969; Schepmania variabilis (M.M. Schepman, 1913); Surcula variabilis Schepman, 1913 (original combination)

= Sibogasyrinx variabilis =

Species of gastropod

Sibogasyrinx variabilis is a species of sea snail, a marine gastropod mollusk in the family Cochlespiridae.

== Description ==
The length of the shell attains 18.5 mm, its diameter 6 mm.

(Original description) The elongately fusiform shell has a long siphonal canal. it is thin and yellowish-white. The shell contains eight whorls, of which about 2 (if normal) form a smooth, slightly inflated, reddish-brown protoconch. The subsequent whorls are subangular, concave in their upper part and separated by a conspicuous waved suture. The sculpture consists of a row of tubercles at the periphery, sharper in upper whorls, more obtuse lower on, a row of granules, just below the suture, becoming scarcely visible in last whorl and entirely or nearly wanting in some specimens. The lower part of the whorls show one or two rather faint, spiral lirae. The part of the last whorl below the keel shows more or less conspicuous spirals, which vary from regular flat lirae to more irregular riblike ones. In the latter case mainly two spirals are stronger. Moreover, there are extremely fine spiral striae and rather conspicuous growth-striae. The aperture is elongated and angular above. The peristome is thin, with a wide sinus above, then protracted. The columellar margin is nearly straight, only slightly concave above, ending in a rather long, narrow siphonal canal, covered with a thin layer of enamel. The interior of the aperture is smooth.

== Remarks ==
Examination of the photograph of the largest specimen (illustrated by Schepman 1913) revealed that it possesses a subsutural row of nodules, more prominent on the upper whorls, which is characteristic of Sibogasyrinx and Comispira but not of other genera of Conoidea. Therefore, the species is transferred to Sibogasyrinx, rendering Shutonia a junior synonym.

== Distribution ==
This marine species occurs off Indonesia and in the Andaman Sea and off Thailand.
