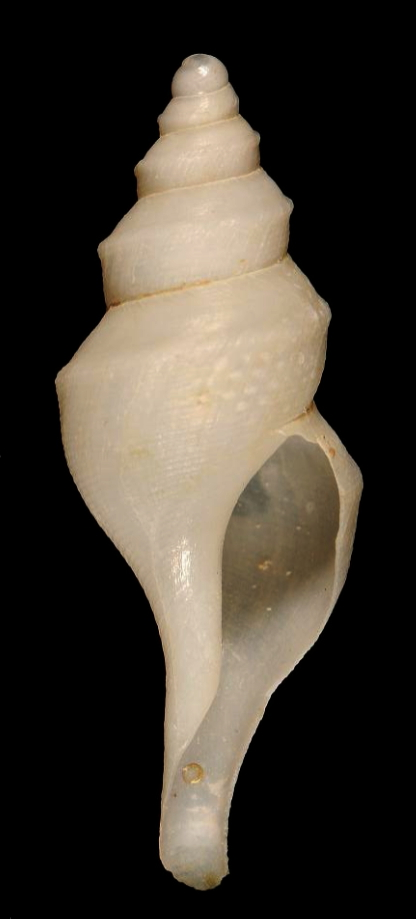
- Shell of Sibogasyrinx pikei (specimen at the Smithsonian Institution)

Scientific classification
- Kingdom: Animalia
- Phylum: Mollusca
- Class: Gastropoda
- Subclass: Caenogastropoda
- Order: Neogastropoda
- Superfamily: Conoidea
- Family: Cochlespiridae
- Genus: Sibogasyrinx
- Species: S. pikei

Binomial name
- Sibogasyrinx pikei (Dell, 1963)

Synonyms
- Leucosyrinx pikei (Dell, 1963) superseded combination; Waitara pikei Dell, 1963

= Sibogasyrinx pikei =

Species of gastropod

Sibogasyrinx pikei is a species of medium-sized predatory sea snail, a marine gastropod mollusc in the family Pseudomelatomidae, the turrids and allies.

== Description ==
The species was originally described based on two specimens, and no new specimens have been reported in the literature since its original description. In 1969, Powell transferred the species to the genus Leucosyrinx. However, the shell is characterized by the presence of a subsutural row of weak but distinct nodules – a feature never found in Leucosyrinx, but present in Sibogasyrinx and Comispira. In its slender shell with relatively weak uniform spiral sculpture the species is more similar to Sibogasyrinx. Therefore, the species is currently attributed, with some reservation, to Sibogasyrinx; this needs confirmation through examination of the radula or molecular data.

== Distribution ==
This marine species is endemic to New Zealand and occurs off North Island.
