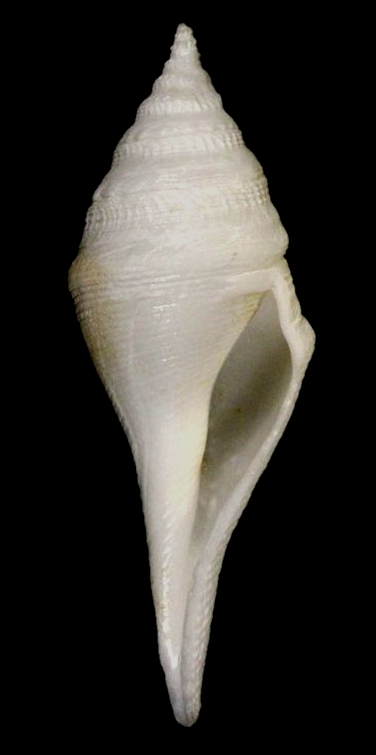
- Shell of Sibogasyrinx lancea (specimen at Naturalis Biodiversity center)

Scientific classification
- Kingdom: Animalia
- Phylum: Mollusca
- Class: Gastropoda
- Subclass: Caenogastropoda
- Order: Neogastropoda
- Superfamily: Conoidea
- Family: Cochlespiridae
- Genus: Sibogasyrinx
- Species: S. lancea

Binomial name
- Sibogasyrinx lancea (Y.-C. Lee, 2001)

Synonyms
- Leucosyrinx lancea Y.-C. Lee, 2001 superseded combination

= Sibogasyrinx lancea =

Species of gastropod

Sibogasyrinx lancea is a species of sea snail, a marine gastropod mollusk in the family Pseudomelatomidae, the turrids and allies.

== Description ==
The length of the shell attains 40 mm.

The species is characterized by a subsutural row of rounded knobs. This is not found in any species of Leucosyrinx, but is, conversely, present in all species of Sibogasyrinx and Comispira. Moreover, a very similar specimen, collected off Luzon, Philippines, at similar depths (518–538 m) was recently sequenced and a partial cox1 sequence confidently places it in Sibogasyrinx. Therefore, the species is transferred to Sibogasyrinx.

== Distribution ==
This bathyal species occurs off the Pratas Island, South China Sea at depths between 430 m and 610 m.
