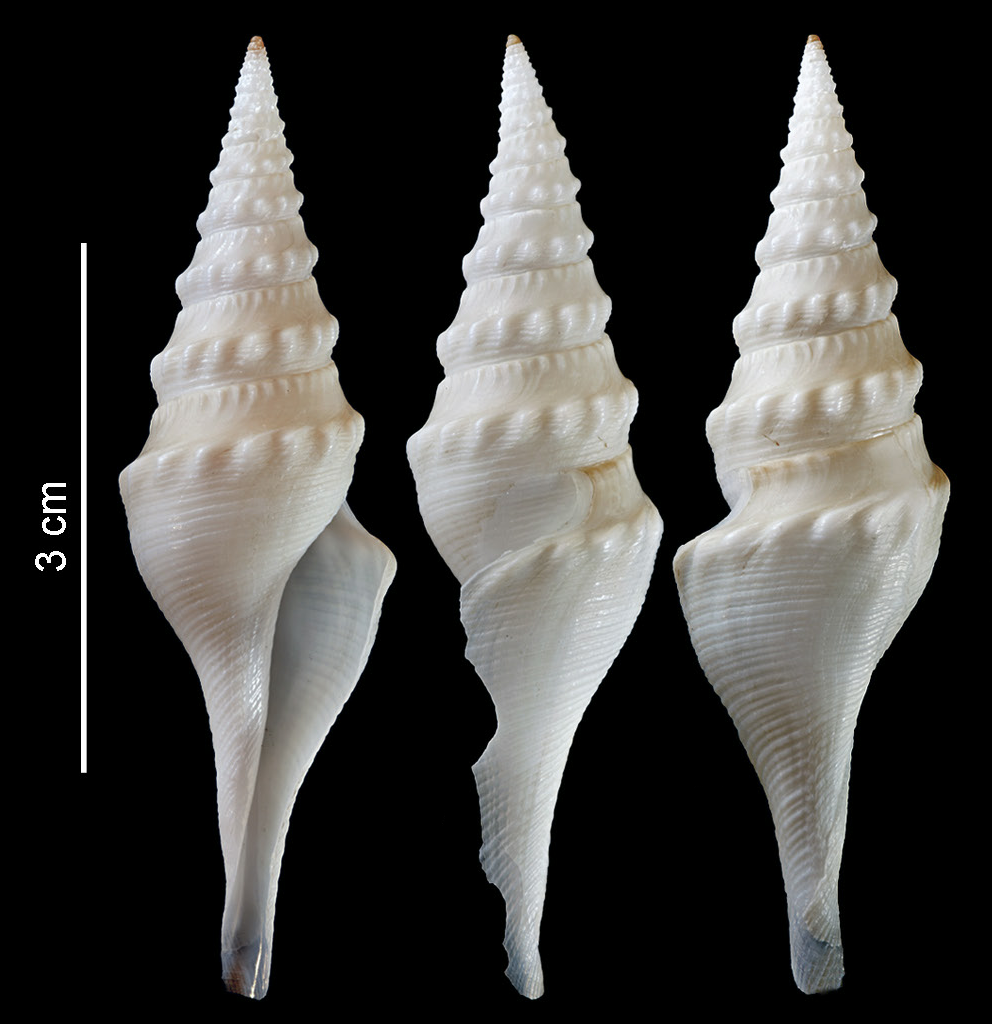
- Shell of Sibogasyrinx subula (holotype in the MNHN, Paris)

Scientific classification
- Kingdom: Animalia
- Phylum: Mollusca
- Class: Gastropoda
- Subclass: Caenogastropoda
- Order: Neogastropoda
- Superfamily: Conoidea
- Family: Cochlespiridae
- Genus: Sibogasyrinx
- Species: S. subula

Binomial name
- Sibogasyrinx subula Kantor & Puillandre, 2021

= Sibogasyrinx subula =

Species of gastropod

Sibogasyrinx subula is a species of sea snail, a marine gastropod mollusc in the family Cochlespiridae.

== Description ==
The length of the shell attains 55 mm, its diameter 15.6 mm.

(Original description) The shell of the holotype is moderately thick and strong, except for the fragile outer lip of the aperture. It is fusiform, with a high spire and a long, narrow, straight siphonal canal.

The protoconch is small and globose, consisting of about 1.5 strongly convex, micro-shagreened whorls. The transition from protoconch to teleoconch is marked by an arcuate axial rib and by the onset of the definitive sculpture. The protoconch measures 1.0 mm in diameter and 0.79 mm in height.

The teleoconch whorls are angular at the shoulder, and the teleoconch comprises just under 10 whorls in total. The suture is shallowly impressed, and the subsutural ramp is broad and strongly concave. The subsutural region bears a row of distinct sigmoidal nodules that correspond in shape to the upper parts of thickened growth lines. There are about 20 such nodules on the first whorl, 17–19 on the second through fourth whorls, 32 on the penultimate whorl, and 30 on the body whorl. The subsutural ramp is otherwise smooth, apart from the subsutural row of nodules, a few thickened growth lines, and 3–4 very weak spiral threads on the last and penultimate whorls.

The shoulder bears pronounced, thickened, and rounded nodules. These are weakly opisthocline on the upper whorls, but on the body horl they are more strongly inclined and become confluent with the growth lines. There are 17 nodules on the penultimate and antepenultimate whorls and 19 on the body whorl.

The spiral sculpture consists of 4–5 moderately pronounced, narrow cords on the shoulder, visible both on the nodules and in the interspaces between them, and of rather distinct, weakly rounded cords below the shoulder, some of which are flattened. A single cord appears on the third whorl, and two cords are present on the other whorls, including the penultimate one. On the body whorl, the cords occupy the entire shell below the shoulder; they vary in width, and their interspaces are one to two times the width of the cords. In total, there are 48 cords on the last whorl, of which 28 are on the siphonal canal.

The shell base gradually narrows toward a long, narrow, nearly straight siphonal canal. The aperture is narrow and constricted posteriorly, with a very narrow and thin parietal callus. The outer lip is partially broken; it forms a rounded angle at the shoulder, is weakly convex below the shoulder, and becomes weakly concave at the transition to the siphonal canal. The anal sinus is moderately deep, subsutural, broadly arcuate, and confluent with the large forward extension of the outer lip.

The shell is off-white, with a very light yellowish subsutural band and a darker subsutural band on the posterior half of the body whorl; the protoconch is light tan.

The anatomy shows a head with long cylindrical tentacles, rounded at the tips and closely set at the bases, and eyes are absent. The specimen is male and has a long penis with an obliquely truncated tip. The seminal papilla occupies the entire tip and is surrounded by a circular fold. The proboscis is conical, with a broad base but is very narrow along most of its length. The proboscis retractors are large and arranged in two bundles attached to the base of the proboscis. The buccal mass is very large and broad, nearly as long as the proboscis, and the oesophagus forms a short loop before the nerve ring. The venom gland is thick, medium-long, and convoluted, and it opens dorsally into the oesophagus just posterior to the nerve ring. The muscular bulb is very large.

The radula is similar in all specimens. It comprises 38–40 rows of teeth, of which 11–17 are nascent, and it is short, measuring about 1.8 mm in length, or 11% of the aperture length excluding the canal. The radula is up to 310 µm wide, corresponding to 1.9% of the aperture length excluding the canal. The central tooth has a broad, subrectangular basal plate that is overlapped anteriorly by the preceding tooth; its borders are distinct, and it bears a narrow, sharply pointed cusp. The marginal teeth have strongly thickened posterior edges and are folded longitudinally.

== Distribution ==
This marine species occurs off the Solomon Islands, Vanuatu and Papua New Guinea at depths between 440 m to 814 m.
