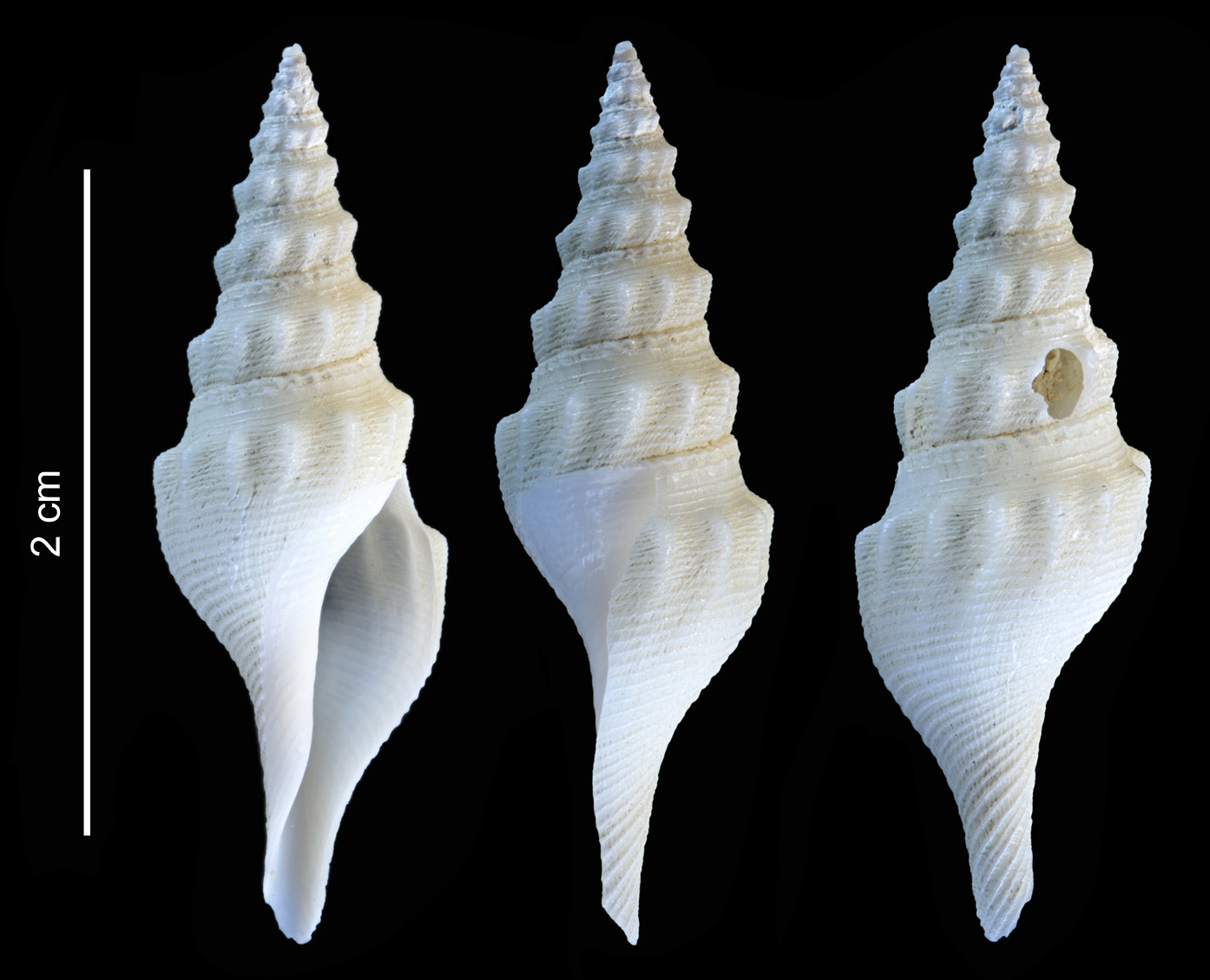
- Shell of Sibogasyrinx elbakyanae (holotype in the MNHN, Paris)

Scientific classification
- Kingdom: Animalia
- Phylum: Mollusca
- Class: Gastropoda
- Subclass: Caenogastropoda
- Order: Neogastropoda
- Superfamily: Conoidea
- Family: Cochlespiridae
- Genus: Sibogasyrinx
- Species: S. elbakyanae

Binomial name
- Sibogasyrinx elbakyanae Kantor, Puillandre & Bouchet, 2021

= Sibogasyrinx elbakyanae =

Species of gastropod

Sibogasyrinx elbakyanae is a species of sea snail, a marine gastropod mollusc in the family Cochlespiridae.

== Description ==
The length of the shell attains 27.3 mm, its diameter 8.9 mm.

(Original description) The shell is moderately thick and strong, except for the fragile outer lip of the aperture, which is partially chipped. It is fusiform, with a high spire and a long, narrow, straight siphonal canal.

The protoconch is eroded and partially decollated, which makes an accurate whorl count and direct measurements impossible. The teleoconch whorls are strongly angled at the shoulder and number about eight in total. The suture is deeply impressed, and the subsutural ramp is moderately broad and strongly concave.

The subsutural region bears a row of dense, distinct, sigmoidal axial ribs that correspond in shape to the upper parts of the thickened growth lines and form small rounded nodules where they intersect the spiral cords. Rib counts on the uppermost whorls are not possible because of surface erosion, but there are about 24 ribs on the antepenultimate whorl, 27 on the penultimate whorl, and 34 on the body whorl. The subsutural ramp also carries thin but distinct spiral cords: three on the first preserved teleoconch whorl and five on each of the last three whorls. One cord lies immediately below the suture, followed by a second cord separated from it by an interval about three times the cord width; three more, more closely spaced cords follow, separated from the second cord by an interval about five times the cord width. The upper two cords form nodules where they intersect the axial ribs.

The shoulder of all teleoconch whorls bears pronounced, thickened, opisthocline axial ribs, with about 12 on the upper whorls, including the penultimate whorl, and 14 on the body whorl. On the spire whorls, the ribs extend down to the abapical suture and are intersected by spiral cords: the uppermost two or three cords are very thin and closely spaced, followed by five to eight more broadly spaced cords. The body whorl carries about 35 spiral cords on and below the shoulder, including approximately 15 on the canal. The cords are narrow and, on the axial ribs at the shoulder, are separated by interspaces one to three times their own width; on the shell base and siphonal canal, they are more broadly spaced. The shell base gradually narrows toward a narrow, moderately long, nearly straight siphonal canal. The aperture is narrow and constricted posteriorly, with a moderately broad but thin parietal callus. The outer lip is partially broken; it forms a rounded angle at the shoulder, is weakly convex below the shoulder, and becomes weakly concave at the transition to the canal. The anal sinus is shallow, subsutural, and broadly arcuate. The shell is off-white on the base, whereas the upper part of the body whorl and the earlier teleoconch whorls are very light yellow. The periostracum is thin and persists in the intervals between the cords and ribs.

The anatomy, examined in an adult male, shows a long penis that gradually narrows toward the tip and is obliquely truncated distally, bearing a small but relatively long conical papilla surrounded by a circular fold. The proboscis is not long, conical, and lacks clearly defined retractor muscles, as the entire posterior part of its base is muscular. The salivary glands are fused and small, and a single oval accessory salivary gland is present at the level of the anterior part of the proboscis. The venom gland is large, thick, and strongly convoluted, and it becomes very constricted just before opening into the oesophagus within the nerve ring. The muscular bulb is moderately large.

The radula is minute and comprises about 15 rows of teeth. It is 650 µm long, corresponding to 6.8% of the aperture length excluding the canal, and up to 100 µm wide, corresponding to 1% of the aperture length excluding the canal. A central tooth is present and bears a long cusp. The marginal teeth are trough-shaped, but due to poor preparation it was not possible to examine their morphology in detail.

== Distribution ==
This marine species occurs off the Solomon Islands at depths between 1136 m and 1750 m.
