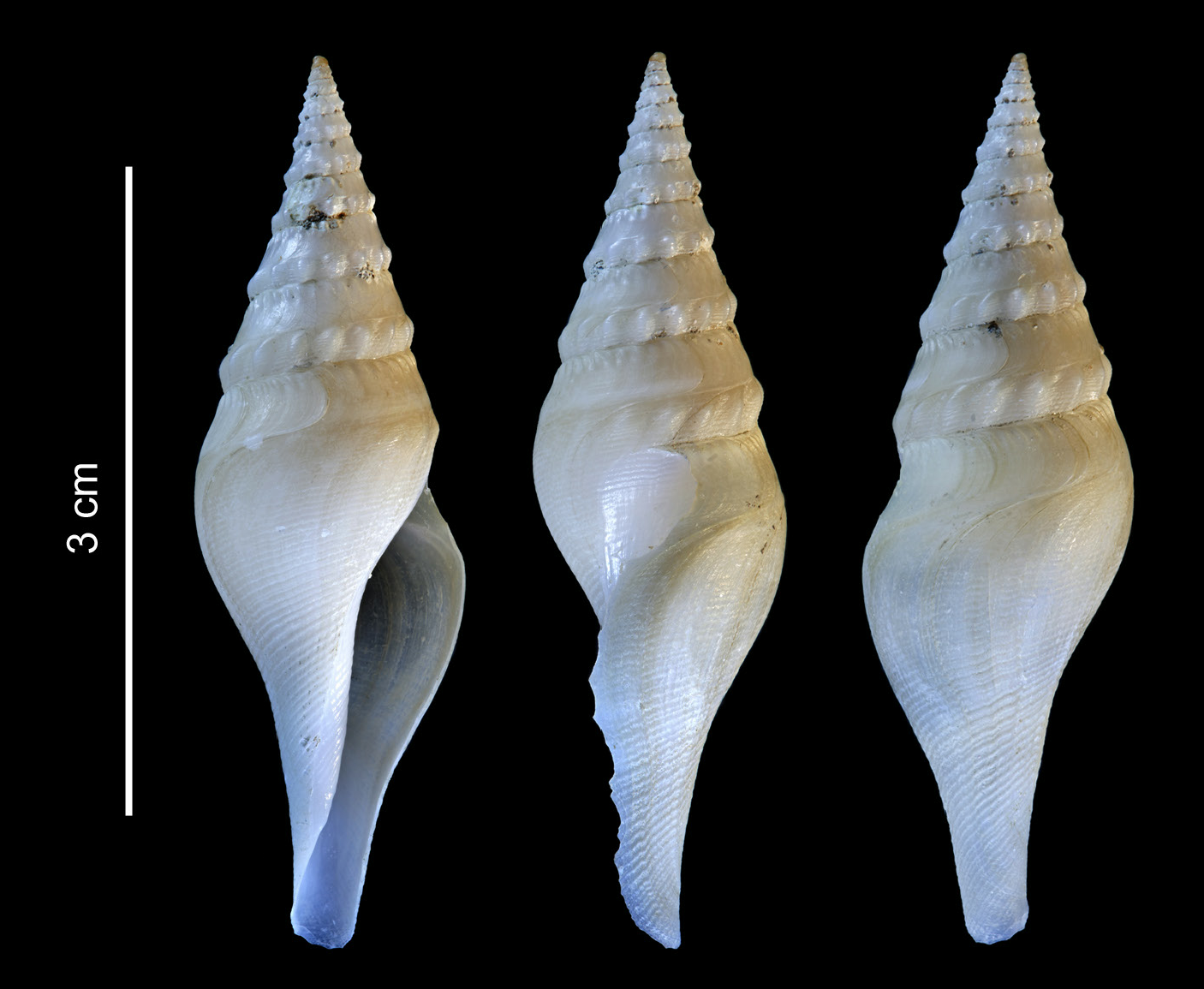
- Shell of Sibogasyrinx maximei (holotype in the MNHN, Paris)

Scientific classification
- Kingdom: Animalia
- Phylum: Mollusca
- Class: Gastropoda
- Subclass: Caenogastropoda
- Order: Neogastropoda
- Superfamily: Conoidea
- Family: Cochlespiridae
- Genus: Sibogasyrinx
- Species: S. maximei

Binomial name
- Sibogasyrinx maximei Kantor & Puillandre, 2021

= Sibogasyrinx maximei =

Species of gastropod

Sibogasyrinx maximei is a species of sea snail, a marine gastropod mollusc in the family Cochlespiridae.

== Description ==
The length of the shell attains 41.6 mm, its diameter 12.4 mm.

(Original description) The species is known from the holotype alone. The shell is moderately thick and strong, except for the fragile, partially broken outer lip of the aperture. It is fusiform, with a high, conical spire and a moderately long, broad, straight siphonal canal.

The protoconch is small and globose, consisting of about 1.5 strongly convex, micro-shagreened whorls. The transition from protoconch to teleoconch is marked by a strongly arcuate axial rib that matches the shape of the growth line. The protoconch measures 1.0 mm in diameter and 0.83 mm in height.

The spire whorls are weakly angled at the shoulder, and the shoulder on the last whorl is hardly discernible. The teleoconch comprises 8.5 whorls in total. The suture is shallowly impressed, and the subsutural ramp is broad, weakly concave on the first four teleoconch whorls, and flat on the later whorls. The subsutural ramp bears short, distinct, prosocline axial wrinkles that correspond to the upper parts of thickened growth lines. These wrinkles extend from the suture to the upper third of the ramp and increase in number from 20 on the first whorl to 34 on the penultimate whorl and 43 on the body whorl. The subsutural ramp shows only traces of indistinct spiral striation.

The shoulder of the teleoconch whorls, except the last one, bears a row of distinct, elongated nodules. These nodules are nearly orthocline on the upper whorls and weakly opisthocline on the penultimate whorl, and there are 14–17 per whorl. They reach the lower suture and are intersected by spiral cords. Starting from the second teleoconch whorl, spiral cords appear on the shoulder; they intersect the nodules and become progressively stronger, increasing from two on the second whorl to nine on the penultimate whorl. The cords are very closely spaced and separated by narrow grooves. On the body whorl, the cords cover the entire shell surface below the indistinct shoulder, with about 50 cords in total, of which 25 are on the siphonal canal. Just below the suture, the cords are weak and slightly wavy, and on the shell base and canal the interspaces are 0.5–1.0 times the width of the cords.

The shell base gradually narrows toward a moderately broad, almost straight siphonal canal. The aperture is narrow and constricted posteriorly, with a narrow and very thin parietal callus. The outer lip is partially broken; it is evenly convex and weakly concave at the transition to the siphonal canal. The anal sinus is moderately deep, subsutural, broadly arcuate, and confluent with the large forward extension of the outer lip. The shell is very light yellowish, and the protoconch is light tan. The periostracum is smooth and tightly adhering.

The radula is medium-long and comprises 40 rows of teeth, of which 12 are nascent. It measures 1.8 mm in length, corresponding to 11.4% of the aperture length excluding the siphonal canal, and is up to 290 µm wide, corresponding to 1.85% of the aperture length excluding the canal. The central tooth has a basal plate with distinct borders and a long, narrow, sharp cusp, and its anterior margin is overlapped by the preceding row, while its posterior margin is formed by two straight sections meeting at an obtuse angle in the midline. The marginal teeth are flat when formed, then become trough-shaped with weakly thickened edges during maturation, and finally fold longitudinally when fully formed, with both margins overlapping at the tooth tip. The resulting folded tooth is moderately broad and sharply pointed, and the border between the two margins remains visible as a narrow slit at the anterior edge. Tooth folding begins in the 14th row from the rear.

== Distribution ==
This marine species occurs off the Solomon Sea at a depth of 720 m.
