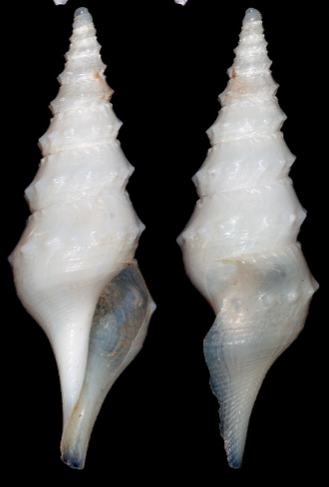
- Shell of Sibogasyrinx suluensis(holotype in the Smithsonian Institution)

Scientific classification
- Kingdom: Animalia
- Phylum: Mollusca
- Class: Gastropoda
- Subclass: Caenogastropoda
- Order: Neogastropoda
- Superfamily: Conoidea
- Family: Cochlespiridae
- Genus: Sibogasyrinx
- Species: S. suluensis

Binomial name
- Sibogasyrinx suluensis (Powell, 1969)

Synonyms
- Comitas suluensis A. W. B. Powell, 1969 superseded combination

= Sibogasyrinx suluensis =

Species of gastropod

Sibogasyrinx suluensis is a species of sea snail, a marine gastropod mollusc in the family Cochlespiridae.

== Description ==
The length of the shell attains 21 mm, its diameter 7 mm.

The shell of this species has a row of subsutural nodules, a feature not found in any species of Leucosyrinx or Comitas, but present in all species of Sibogasyrinx and Comispira. In shell outline the species is more similar to Sibogasyrinx than to any Comispira, therefore it is allocated to Sibogasyrinx.

== Distribution ==
This marine species occurs in the Sulu Sea, the Philippines.
