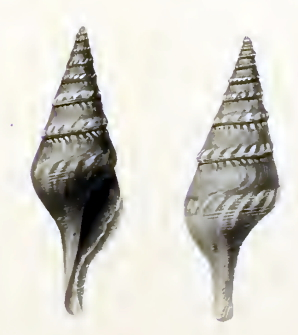
- Shells of Sibogasyrinx pyramidalis

Scientific classification
- Kingdom: Animalia
- Phylum: Mollusca
- Class: Gastropoda
- Subclass: Caenogastropoda
- Order: Neogastropoda
- Superfamily: Conoidea
- Family: Cochlespiridae
- Genus: Sibogasyrinx; Powell, 1969

Type species
- Surcula pyramidalis Schepman, 1913

Synonyms
- Leucosyrinx (Sibogasyrinx) Powell, 1969; Schepmania Shuto, 1970 Invalid: junior homonym of Schepmania F. Haas, 1910 [Bivalvia]; Shutonia is a replacement name); Shutonia van der Bijl, 1993 junior subjective synonym

= Sibogasyrinx =

Genus of gastropods

Sibogasyrinx is a genus of sea snails, marine gastropod mollusks in the family Cochlespiridae.

== Taxonomy ==
In shell characters Sibogasyrinx strongly resembles three distantly-related genera, two of which, Comitas and Leucosyrinx, belong to a different family, the Pseudomelatomidae. Previously it was considered a subgenus of Leucosyrinx Dall, 1889 at that time assigned to the Cochlespiridae (Powell 1966; Taylor et al. 1993)

Species of Sibogasyrinx are unique among the superfamily Conoidea on account of the high intrageneric variability in radular morphology, typical of Cochlespiridae – with paired marginal and well-defined central teeth. Three distinct radula types are found within Sibogasyrinx

Many species are known from a very limited number of specimens, and their interspecific and intraspecific variability has not been evaluated.

== General characteristics ==
The shell is small to large, with adult specimens ranging from 27 to 65 mm in length. It is narrowly fusiform and only rarely pagodiform, and bears a concave to nearly flat subsutural ramp. Spiral sculpture is always present below the shoulder and is variously developed, consisting of narrow, close‑set cords that may also extend onto the subsutural ramp. The shoulder carries a row of strong nodules, although these often become obsolete on the body whorl.

The venom gland does not pass through the nerve ring, but instead opens into the oesophagus either within or just posterior to the nerve ring. The radula usually bears a central tooth, which is lacking in one species, and the marginal teeth show variable morphology, being folded longitudinally.

== Distribution ==
Presently, species of Sibogasyrinx are known only from the central West Pacific – from the South China Sea and the Philippines to Indonesia (type species, Sibogasyrinx pyramidalis) and south to Vanuatu, New Caledonia and Australia.

== Species ==
Species within the genus Sibogasyrinx include:

- Sibogasyrinx clausura Kantor & Puillandre, 2021
- Sibogasyrinx elbakyanae Kantor, Puillandre & Bouchet, 2021
- Sibogasyrinx filosa Ardovini, 2021
- Sibogasyrinx lancea (Y.-C. Lee, 2001)
- Sibogasyrinx lolae Kantor & Puillandre, 2021
- Sibogasyrinx maximei Kantor & Puillandre, 2021
- Sibogasyrinx pagodiformis Kantor & Puillandre, 2021
- Sibogasyrinx pikei (Dell, 1963)
- Sibogasyrinx pyramidalis (Schepman, 1913)
- Sibogasyrinx sangeri Kantor, Fedosov & Puillandre, 2018
- Sibogasyrinx subula Kantor & Puillandre, 2021
- Sibogasyrinx suluensis (A. W. B. Powell, 1969)
- Sibogasyrinx variabilis (Schepman, 1913)

Synonyms

- Sibogasyrinx archibenthalis (Powell, 1969): synonym of Leucosyrinx archibenthalis A. W. B. Powell, 1969 (superseded combination)
- Sibogasyrinx filosus Ardovini, 2021: synonym of Sibogasyrinx filosa Ardovini, 2021 (wrong gender agreement of specific epithet)
