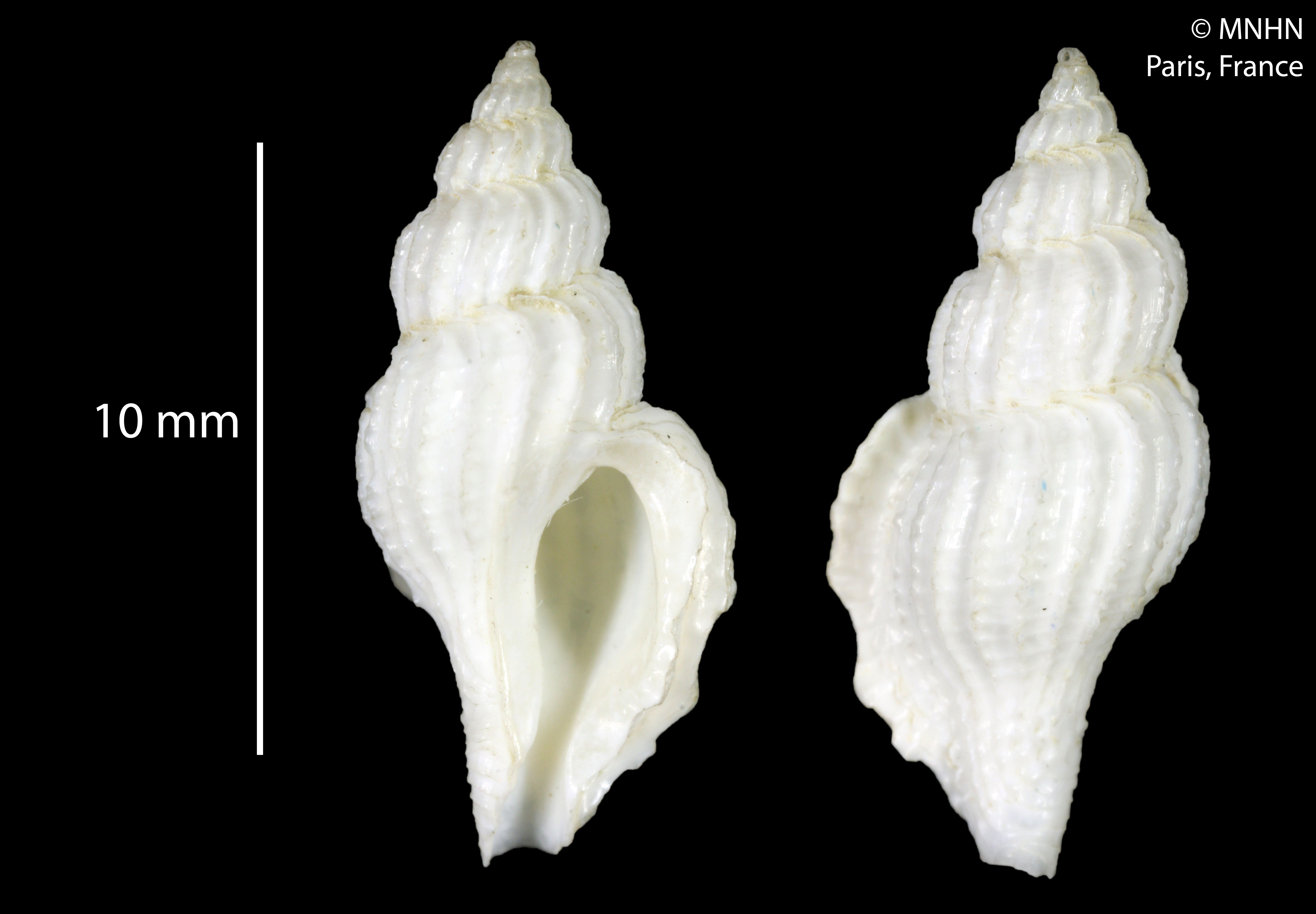
- Daphnellopsis fimbriata

Scientific classification
- Kingdom: Animalia
- Phylum: Mollusca
- Class: Gastropoda
- Subclass: Caenogastropoda
- Order: Neogastropoda
- Superfamily: Muricoidea
- Family: Muricidae
- Subfamily: Ergalataxinae
- Genus: Daphnellopsis; Schepman, 1913

Type species
- Daphnellopsis lamellosa Schepman, 1913

Species
- See text

= Daphnellopsis =

Genus of gastropods

Daphnellopsis is a genus of sea snails, marine gastropod mollusks in the family Muricidae.

== Species ==
Species within the genus Daphnellopsis include:

- Daphnellopsis fimbriata (Hinds, 1843)
- Daphnellopsis hypselos Houart, 1995
- Daphnellopsis lamellosa Schepman, 1913
- Daphnellopsis lochi Houart, 2013
- † Daphnellopsis lozoueti Houart, 2013
- † Daphnellopsis pinedai Houart, 2013

Species brought into synonymy

- Daphnellopsis murex Hedley, 1922: synonym of Lindapterys murex (Hedley, 1922)
