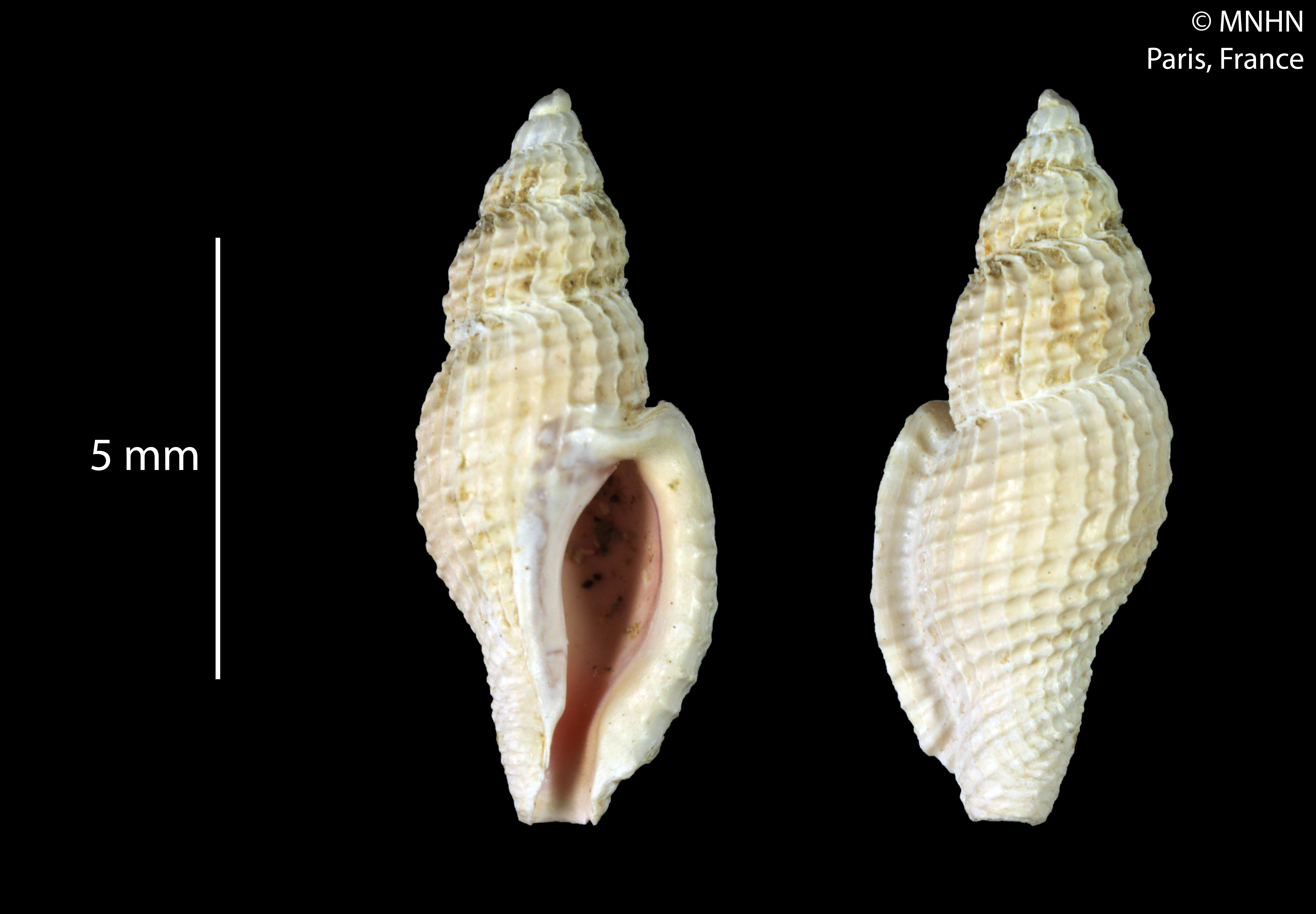

Scientific classification
- Kingdom: Animalia
- Phylum: Mollusca
- Class: Gastropoda
- Subclass: Caenogastropoda
- Order: Neogastropoda
- Superfamily: Muricoidea
- Family: Muricidae
- Subfamily: Ergalataxinae
- Genus: Daphnellopsis
- Species: D. lamellosa

Binomial name
- Daphnellopsis lamellosa Schepman, 1913

= Daphnellopsis lamellosa =

Species of gastropod

Daphnellopsis lamellosa is a species of sea snail, a marine gastropod mollusk, in the family Muricidae, the murex snails or rock snails.
