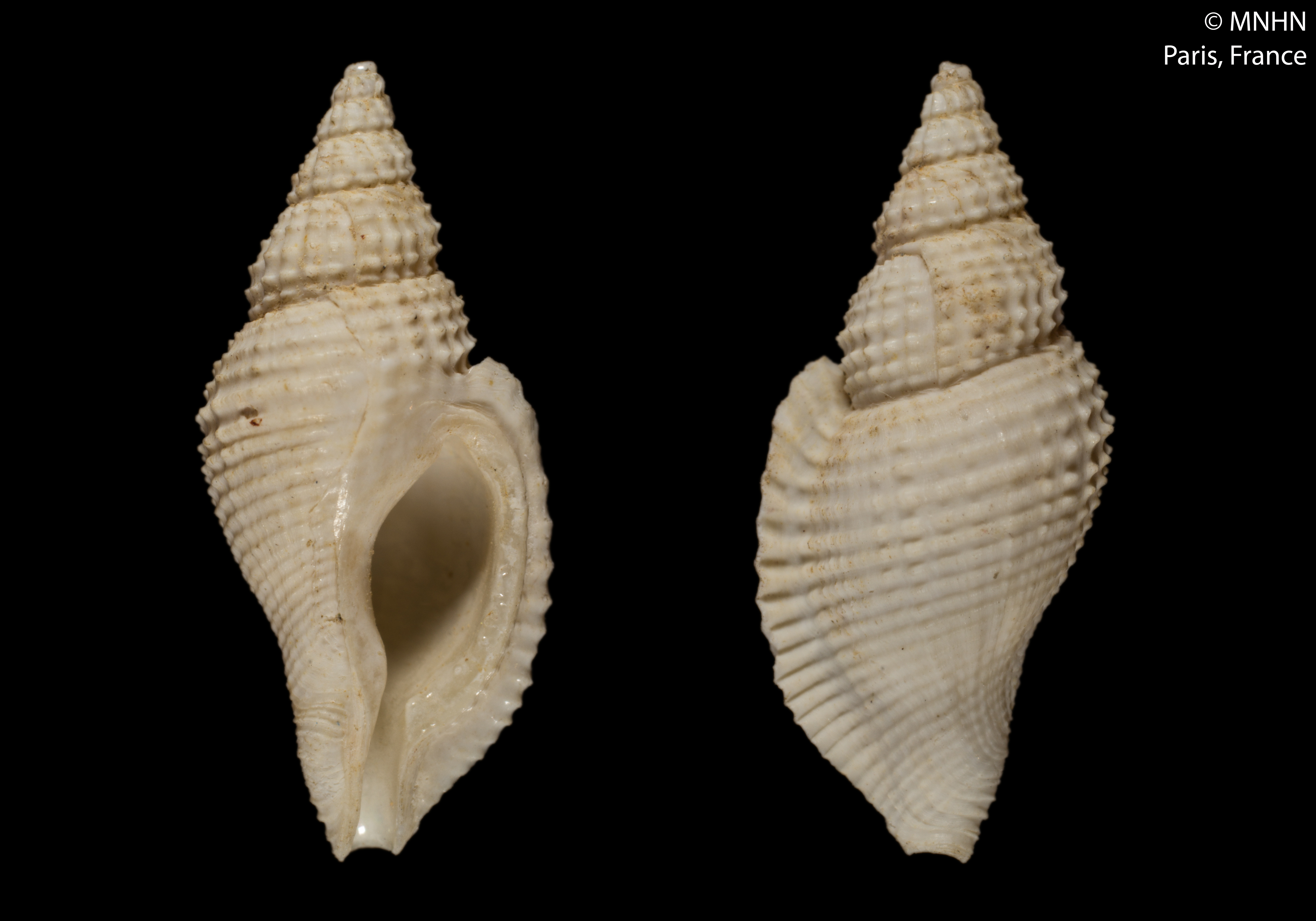

Scientific classification
- Kingdom: Animalia
- Phylum: Mollusca
- Class: Gastropoda
- Subclass: Caenogastropoda
- Order: Neogastropoda
- Superfamily: Muricoidea
- Family: Muricidae
- Subfamily: Ergalataxinae
- Genus: Daphnellopsis
- Species: †D. lozoueti

Binomial name
- †Daphnellopsis lozoueti Houart, 2013

= Daphnellopsis lozoueti =

Extinct species of gastropod

Daphnellopsis lozoueti is an extinct species of sea snail, a marine gastropod mollusk, in the family Muricidae, the murex snails or rock snails.
