= Lindapterys sanderi =

Scientific classification
- Kingdom: Animalia
- Phylum: Mollusca
- Class: Gastropoda
- Subclass: Caenogastropoda
- Order: Neogastropoda
- Family: Muricidae
- Genus: Lindapterys
- Species: L. sanderi

Binomial name
- Lindapterys sanderi Petuch, 1987

Synonyms
- Lindapterys rosalimae Nascimento de Barros, 1990

Species of gastropod

Lindapterys sanderi is a species of sea snail, a marine gastropod mollusk in the family Muricidae, the murex snails or rock snails.

== Description ==
Original description: "General morphology as for genus; 6 axial ribs between varices; 5 labial denticles; outer edge of lip very flaring, almost obscuring the underlying varix."

== Distribution ==
Locus typicus: "300 metres depth, off St. James,
West coast of Barbados, Lesser Antilles."
