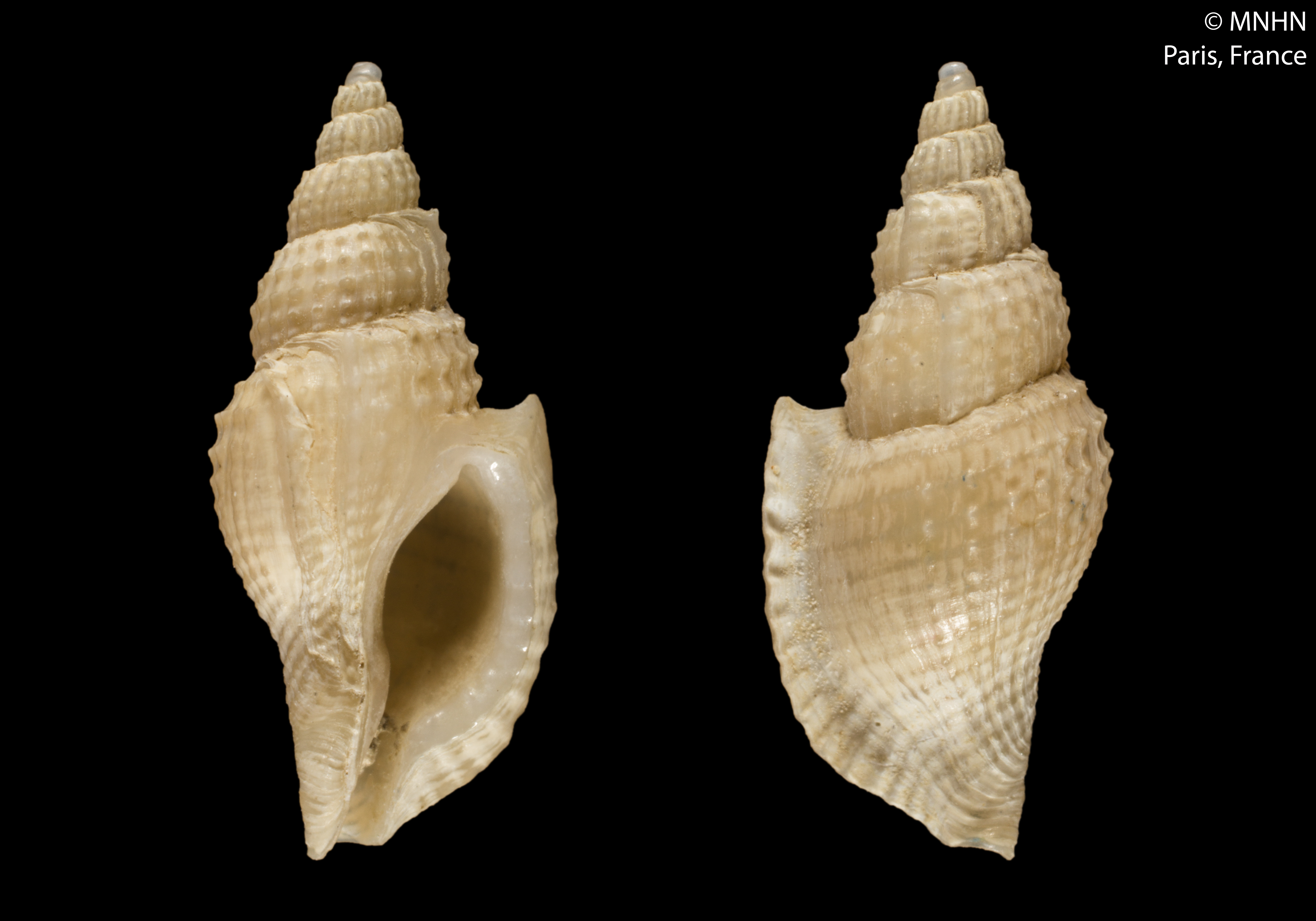

Scientific classification
- Kingdom: Animalia
- Phylum: Mollusca
- Class: Gastropoda
- Subclass: Caenogastropoda
- Order: Neogastropoda
- Family: Muricidae
- Subfamily: Ergalataxinae
- Genus: Daphnellopsis
- Species: D. hypselos

Binomial name
- Daphnellopsis hypselos Houart, 1995

= Daphnellopsis hypselos =

Species of gastropod

Daphnellopsis hypselos is a species of sea snail, a marine gastropod mollusk in the family Muricidae.
