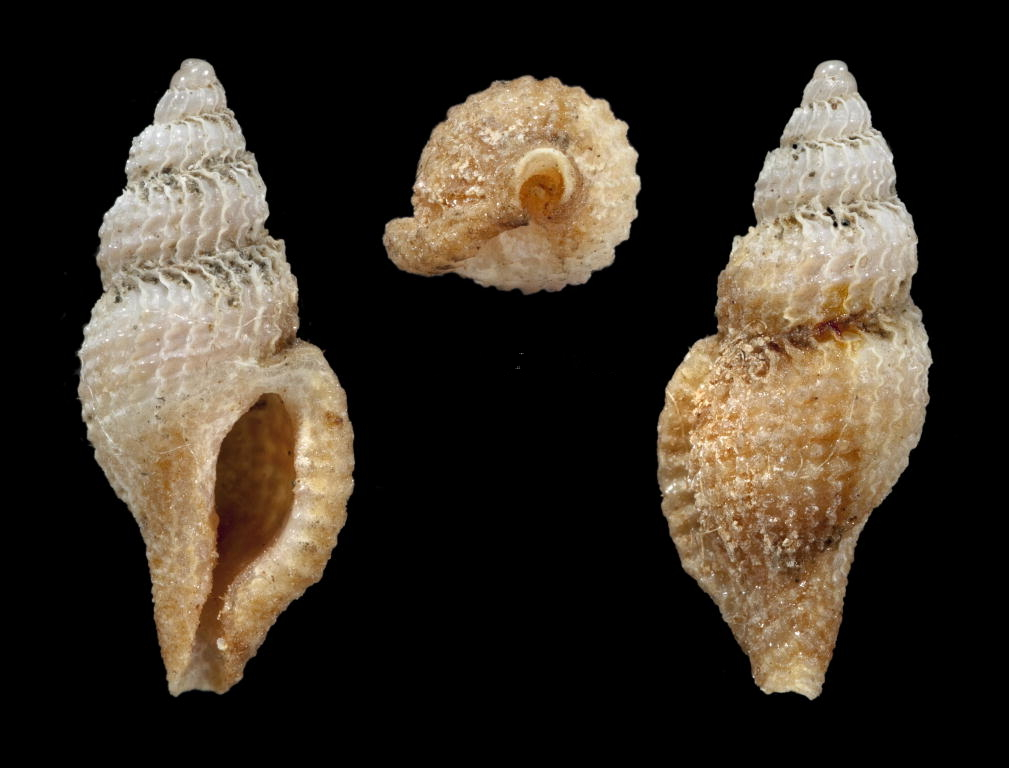
- Shell of Daphnellopsis fimbriata (holotype at the Natural History Museum, London)

Scientific classification
- Kingdom: Animalia
- Phylum: Mollusca
- Class: Gastropoda
- Subclass: Caenogastropoda
- Order: Neogastropoda
- Family: Muricidae
- Subfamily: Ergalataxinae
- Genus: Daphnellopsis
- Species: D. fimbriata

Binomial name
- Daphnellopsis fimbriata (Hinds, 1843)

Synonyms
- Clavatula fimbriata Hinds, 1843; Daphnellopsis lamellosa Schepman, 1913

= Daphnellopsis fimbriata =

Species of gastropod

Daphnellopsis fimbriata is a species of sea snail, a marine gastropod mollusk in the family Muricidae.

== Description ==
D. fimbriata is a small sea snail in the Muricidae family. Its shell typically measures about 15 mm (0.59 in) in length. The shell is slender and lance-shaped and it features a crimped appearance with lots of folds and ridges. The spire is high and pointed. It has about 1.5 to 1.75 smooth initial whorls, followed by up to six narrow, slightly convex whorls. The suture, or junction between whorls, is sometimes obscured. The shell's color ranges from white to light tan. It may have brown blotches or a brownish-orange band near the suture and on the siphonal canal. The shell opening is similarly light-colored inside.

This marine species can be found in the Philippines, New Guinea, and the Loyalty Islands. It is generally can be found at depths of 160 to 222 m (525 to 728 ft). As mentioned earlier, D. fimbriata is part of the Muricidae family and they are known for their decorated and spiny shells. The specific ecological role and behavior of this species are not well-known, but like other muricids, it probably is a carnivorous predator that feeds on other marine invertebrates.

== Distribution ==
D. fimbriata is found in the Indo-Pacific region, in the Philippines, New Guinea, and the Loyalty Islands. In the Philippines, D. fimbriata has been found in Aliguay Island, Bohol, and Mactan Island. In New Caledonia, D. fimbriata can be found at depths of 160 to 222 m (525 to 728 ft).

It seems that D. fimbriata prefers tropical marine environments. However, its habitat preferences are still not well-known. More research is needed to fully understand its distribution.
