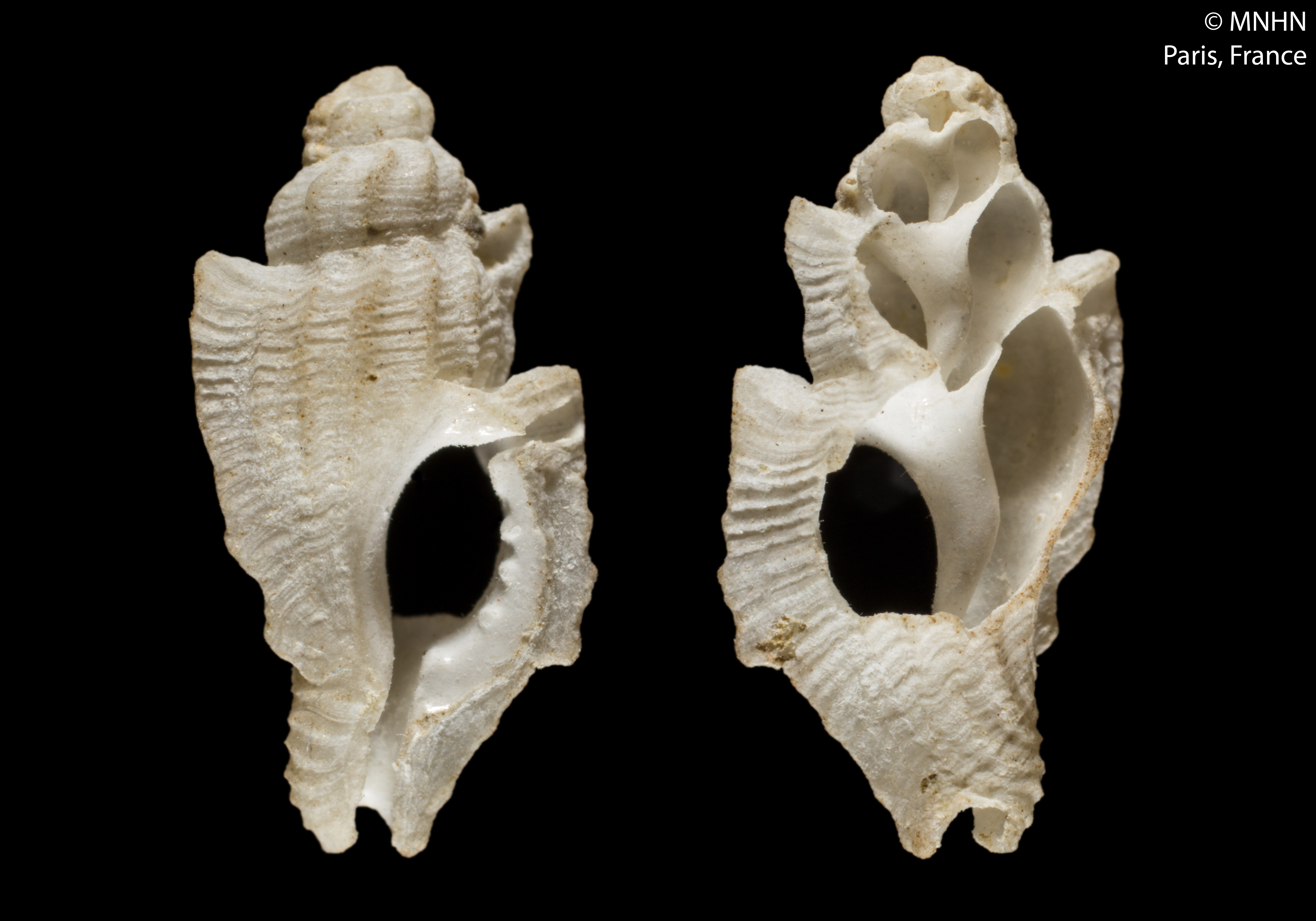
- Shell of Lindapterys domlamyi (holotype at MNHN, Paris)

Scientific classification
- Kingdom: Animalia
- Phylum: Mollusca
- Class: Gastropoda
- Subclass: Caenogastropoda
- Order: Neogastropoda
- Superfamily: Muricoidea
- Family: Muricidae
- Subfamily: Ergalataxinae
- Genus: Lindapterys
- Species: L. domlamyi

Binomial name
- Lindapterys domlamyi Garrigues & Merle, 2014

= Lindapterys domlamyi =

Species of gastropod

Lindapterys domlamyi is a species of sea snail, a marine gastropod mollusk, in the family Muricidae, the murex snails or rock snails.

== Description ==
The length of the shell attains 7.9 mm.

== Distribution ==
This marine species occurs off Guadeloupe.
