= Lindapterys vokesae =

Scientific classification
- Kingdom: Animalia
- Phylum: Mollusca
- Class: Gastropoda
- Subclass: Caenogastropoda
- Order: Neogastropoda
- Family: Muricidae
- Genus: Lindapterys
- Species: L. vokesae

Binomial name
- Lindapterys vokesae Petuch, 1987

Species of gastropod

Lindapterys vokesae is a species of sea snail, a marine gastropod mollusk in the family Muricidae, the murex snails or rock snails.

== Description ==
Original description: "General morphology as for genus; 6 axial ribs between varices; 5 tiny labial denticles; outer edge of lip flaring but narrow."

== Distribution ==
Locus typicus: "Locality TU951(Tulane University Locality), Ten Mile Creek,
Calhoun County, Florida, Chipola Formation, early Miocene of North Florida."
