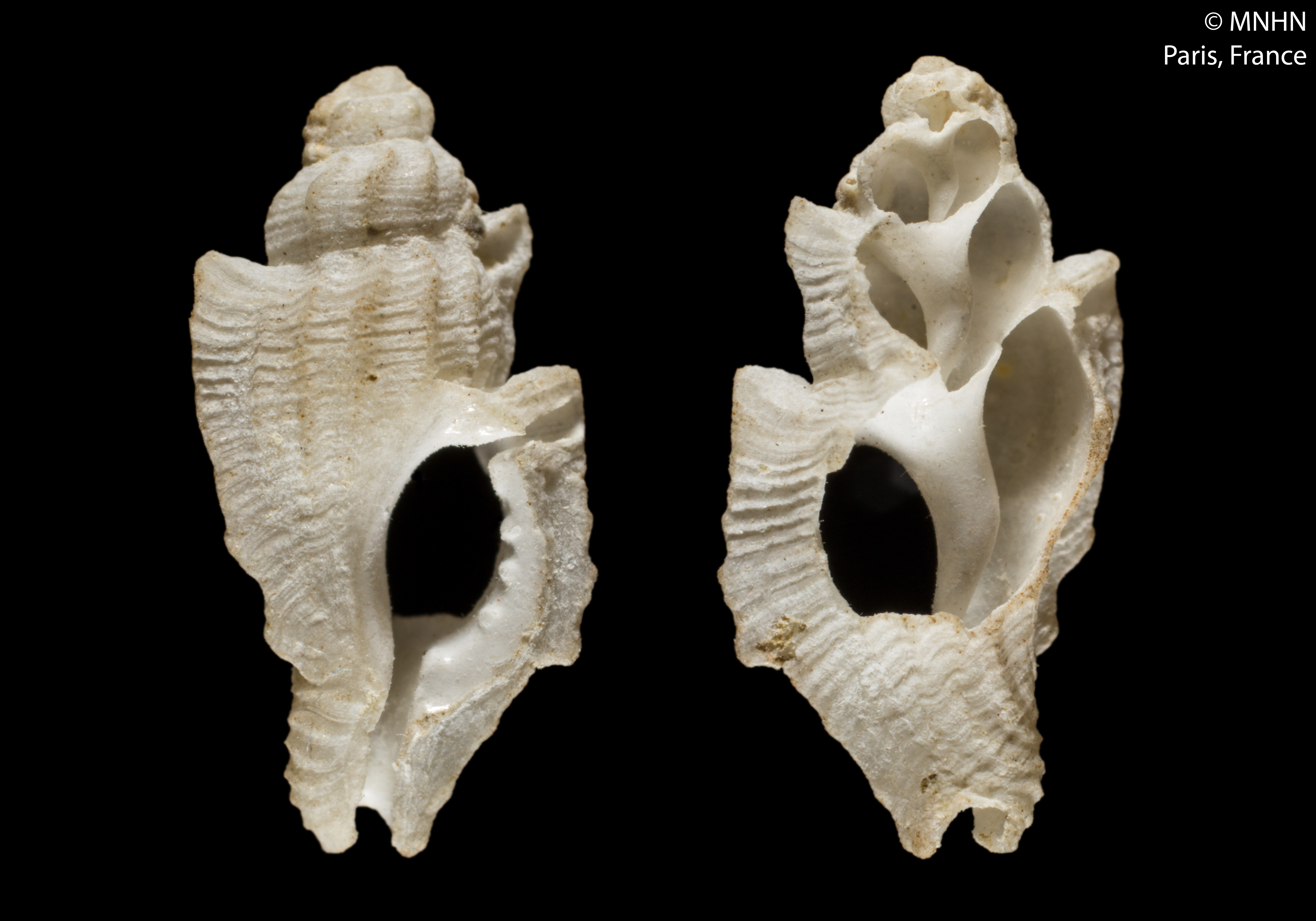
- Shell of Lindapterys domlamyi

Scientific classification
- Kingdom: Animalia
- Phylum: Mollusca
- Class: Gastropoda
- Subclass: Caenogastropoda
- Order: Neogastropoda
- Superfamily: Muricoidea
- Family: Muricidae
- Subfamily: Ergalataxinae
- Genus: Lindapterys; Petuch, 1987

Type species
- † Lindapterys vokesae Petuch, 1987

= Lindapterys =

Genus of gastropods

Lindapterys is a genus of sea snails, marine gastropod mollusks in the family Muricidae, the murex snails or rock snails.

== Species ==
Species within the genus Lindapterys include:

- † Lindapterys alata (Millet, 1865)
- † Lindapterys cervantesorum Goret, Ledon & Pons, 2013
- Lindapterys domlamyi Garrigues & Merle, 2014
- Lindapterys murex (Hedley, 1922)
- † Lindapterys poppelacki (Hörnes, 1853)
- Lindapterys sanderi Petuch, 1987
- Lindapterys soderiae Callea, Volpi, Martignoni & Borri, 2001
- Lindapterys vokesae Petuch, 1987

Species brought into synonymy

- Lindapterys rosalimae Barros, 1990: synonym of Lindapterys sanderi Petuch, 1987
- Lindapterys soderii Callea, Volpi, Martignoni & Borri, 2001: synonym of Lindapterys soderiae Callea, Volpi, Martignoni & Borri, 2001
