= Lindapterys soderiae =

Scientific classification
- Kingdom: Animalia
- Phylum: Mollusca
- Class: Gastropoda
- Subclass: Caenogastropoda
- Order: Neogastropoda
- Family: Muricidae
- Genus: Lindapterys
- Species: L. soderiae

Binomial name
- Lindapterys soderiae Callea, Volpi, Martignoni & Borri, 2001

Synonyms
- Lindapterys soderii Callea, Volpi, Martignoni & Borri, 2001

Species of gastropod

Lindapterys soderiae is a species of sea snail, a marine gastropod mollusk in the family Muricidae, the murex snails or rock snails.
