= Lindapterys murex =

Scientific classification
- Kingdom: Animalia
- Phylum: Mollusca
- Class: Gastropoda
- Subclass: Caenogastropoda
- Order: Neogastropoda
- Family: Muricidae
- Genus: Lindapterys
- Species: L. murex

Binomial name
- Lindapterys murex (Hedley, 1922)

Synonyms
- Daphnellopsis murex Hedley, 1922

Species of gastropod

Lindapterys murex is a species of sea snail, a marine gastropod mollusk in the family Muricidae, the murex snails or rock snails.

== Distribution ==
This marine species occurs off New Caledonia and Queensland, Australia.
