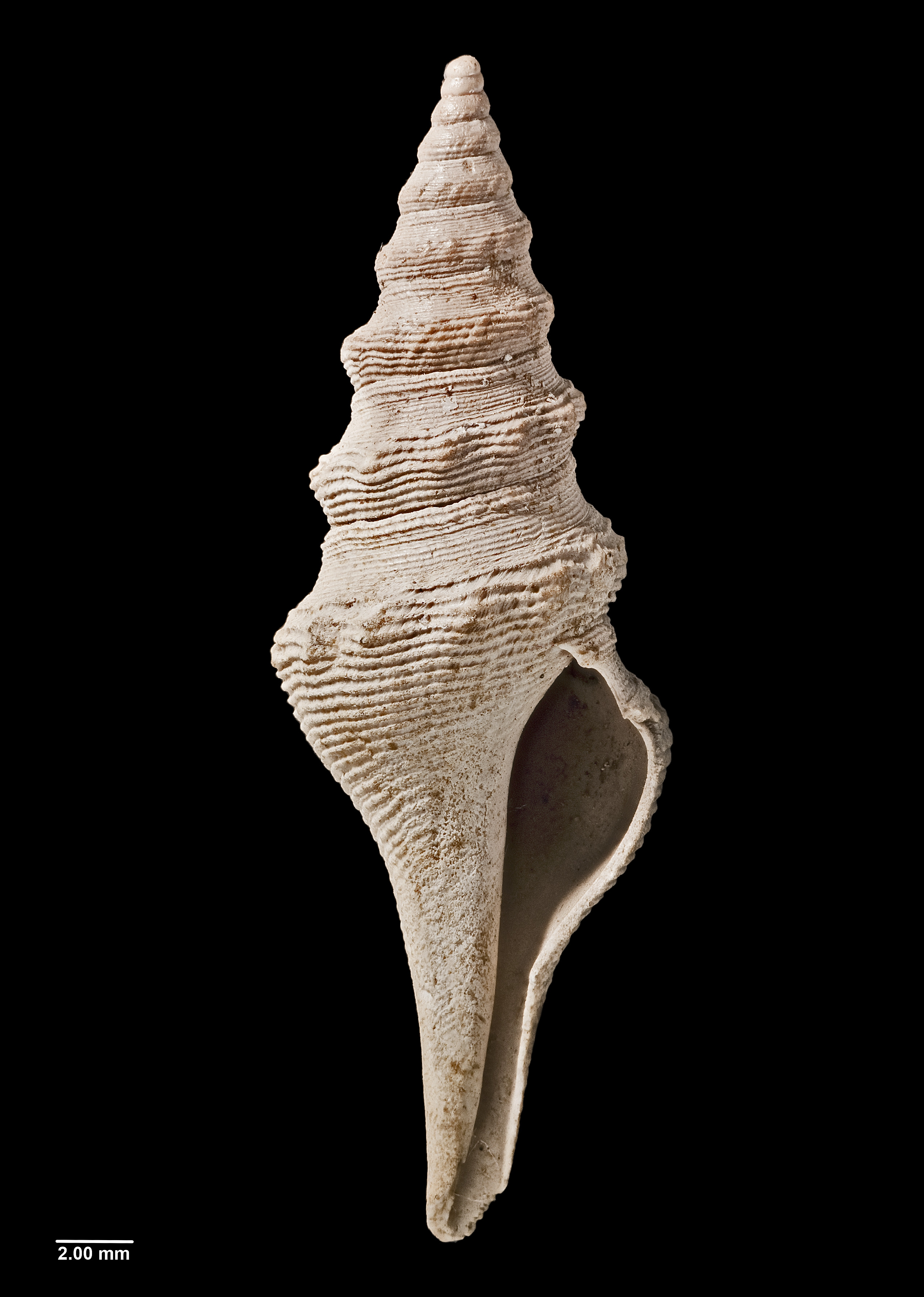
- Holotype from Auckland War Memorial Museum

Scientific classification
- Kingdom: Animalia
- Phylum: Mollusca
- Class: Gastropoda
- Subclass: Caenogastropoda
- Order: Neogastropoda
- Family: Cochlespiridae
- Genus: Apiotoma
- Species: †A. balcombensis

Binomial name
- †Apiotoma balcombensis A. W. B. Powell, 1944

= Apiotoma balcombensis =

Apiotoma balcombensis Temporal range: middle Miocene

Extinct species of gastropod

Apiotoma balcombensis is an extinct species of sea snail, a marine gastropod mollusc, in the family Cochlespiridae. Fossils of the species date to the middle Miocene strata of the Port Phillip Basin of Victoria, Australia, and likely represent a descendant species of the late Oligocene species Apiotoma janjukiensis, known from the same locality.

== Description ==
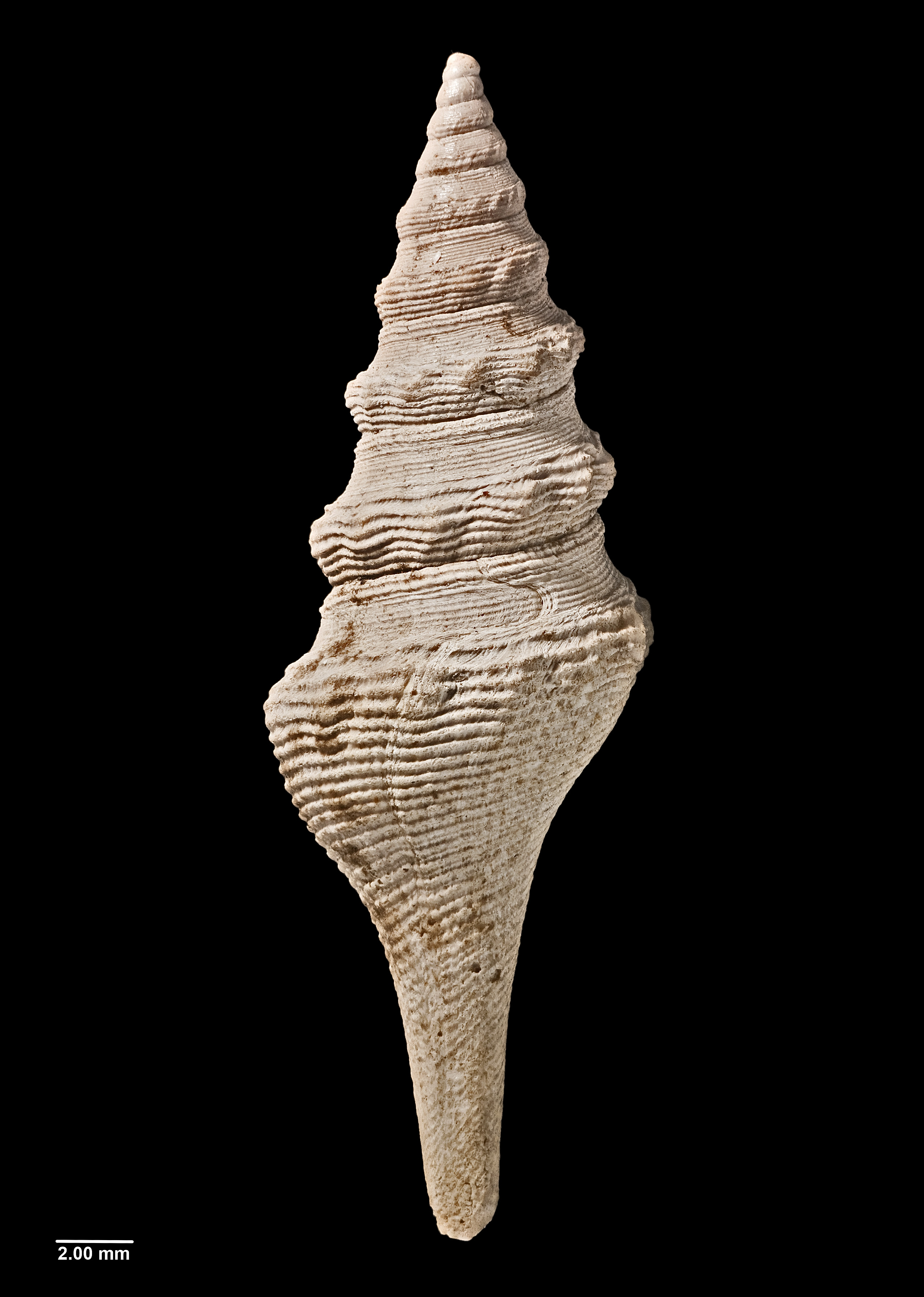
Reverse view of holotype

In the original description, Powell described the species as follows:

Species evidently the linear descendant of janjukiensis, differing from it chiefly by the presence of regular axials on the broadly rounded peripheral bulge. Also the subsutural fold bears two spiral cords; that at janjukiensis has a single thread only, defining its lower edge. Protoconch globose, of 2 1/2 smooth whorls, with small asymmetric tip. Spiral sculpture of 6-7 narrow but sharply raised cords, extending over the peripheral bulge to the lower suture, about 40 on body-whorl from the periphery to the end of the canal. There are 6-7 distinct spiral lirations on the shouder or sinus area. In janjukiensis the shoulder spirals increase from 4-8, but are much weaker. Axials broad, fold-like, restricted to the peripheral bulge, 12 per whorl, strongest on later whorls. Sinus rather deep, constricted by the subsutural fold.

The holotype of the species has a height of 31.3 mm (1.23 in), and a diameter of 10.6 mm (0.42 in). It can be distinguished from other members of the genus due to its strong peripheral nodules (12-14 per whorl).

== Taxonomy ==
The species was first described by A. W. B. Powell in 1944, who believed that the species was likely a descendant of the late Oligocene A. janjukiensis, due to morphological similarities and as the fossils came from the same type localities. The holotype was collected prior to 1944 from Fossil Beach, Balcombe Bay, Victoria, Australia. It is held by the Auckland War Memorial Museum.

== Distribution ==
This extinct marine species occurs in middle Miocene strata of the Port Phillip Basin of Victoria, Australia, including the Gellibrand Formation.
