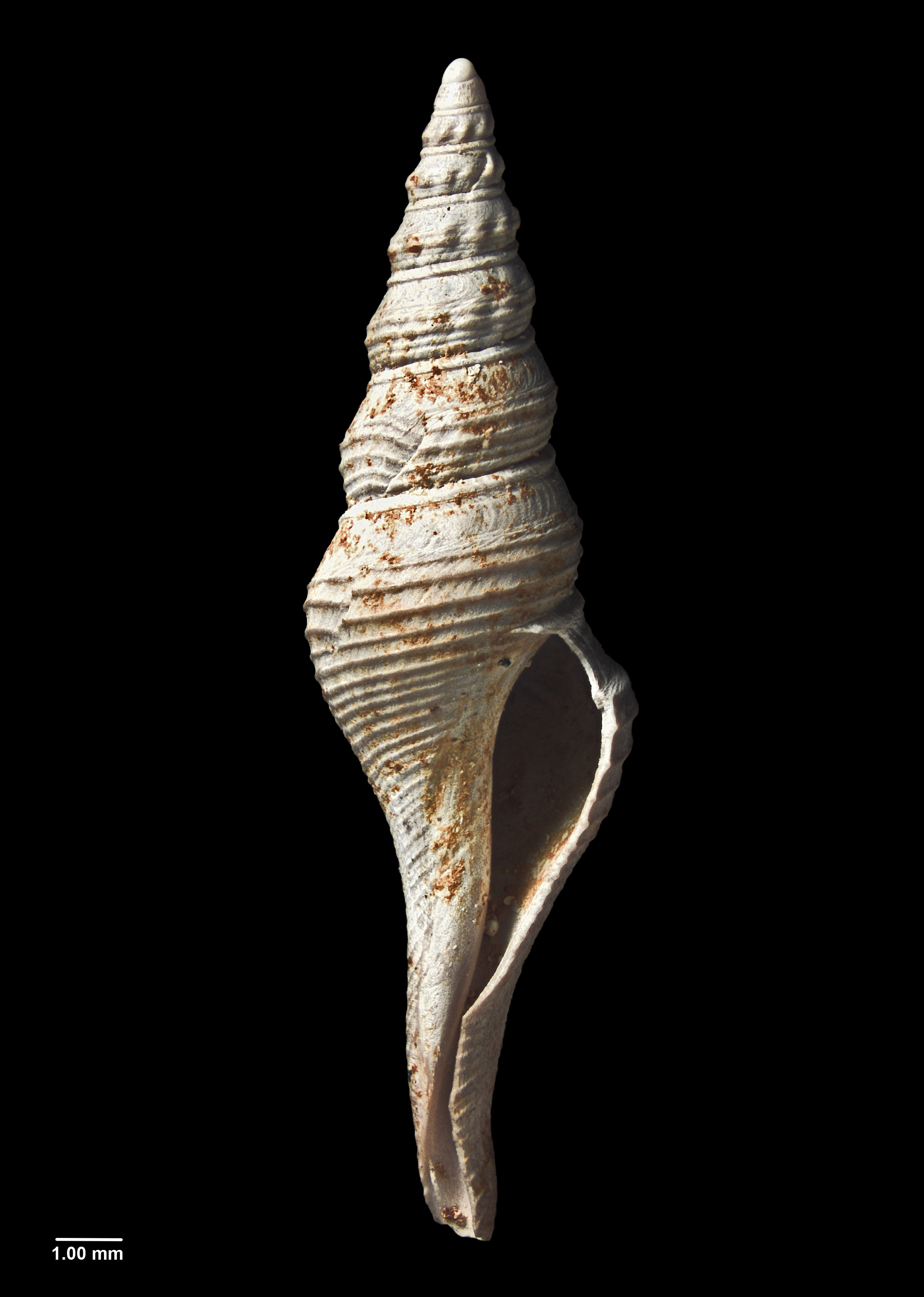
- Holotype from Auckland War Memorial Museum

Scientific classification
- Kingdom: Animalia
- Phylum: Mollusca
- Class: Gastropoda
- Subclass: Caenogastropoda
- Order: Neogastropoda
- Family: Cochlespiridae
- Genus: Apiotoma
- Species: †A. chapplei

Binomial name
- †Apiotoma chapplei A. W. B. Powell, 1944

= Apiotoma chapplei =

Apiotoma chapplei Temporal range: middle Miocene

Extinct species of gastropod

Apiotoma chapplei is an extinct species of sea snail, a marine gastropod mollusc, in the family Cochlespiridae. Fossils of the species date to the middle Miocene strata of the Port Phillip Basin of Victoria, Australia.

== Description ==
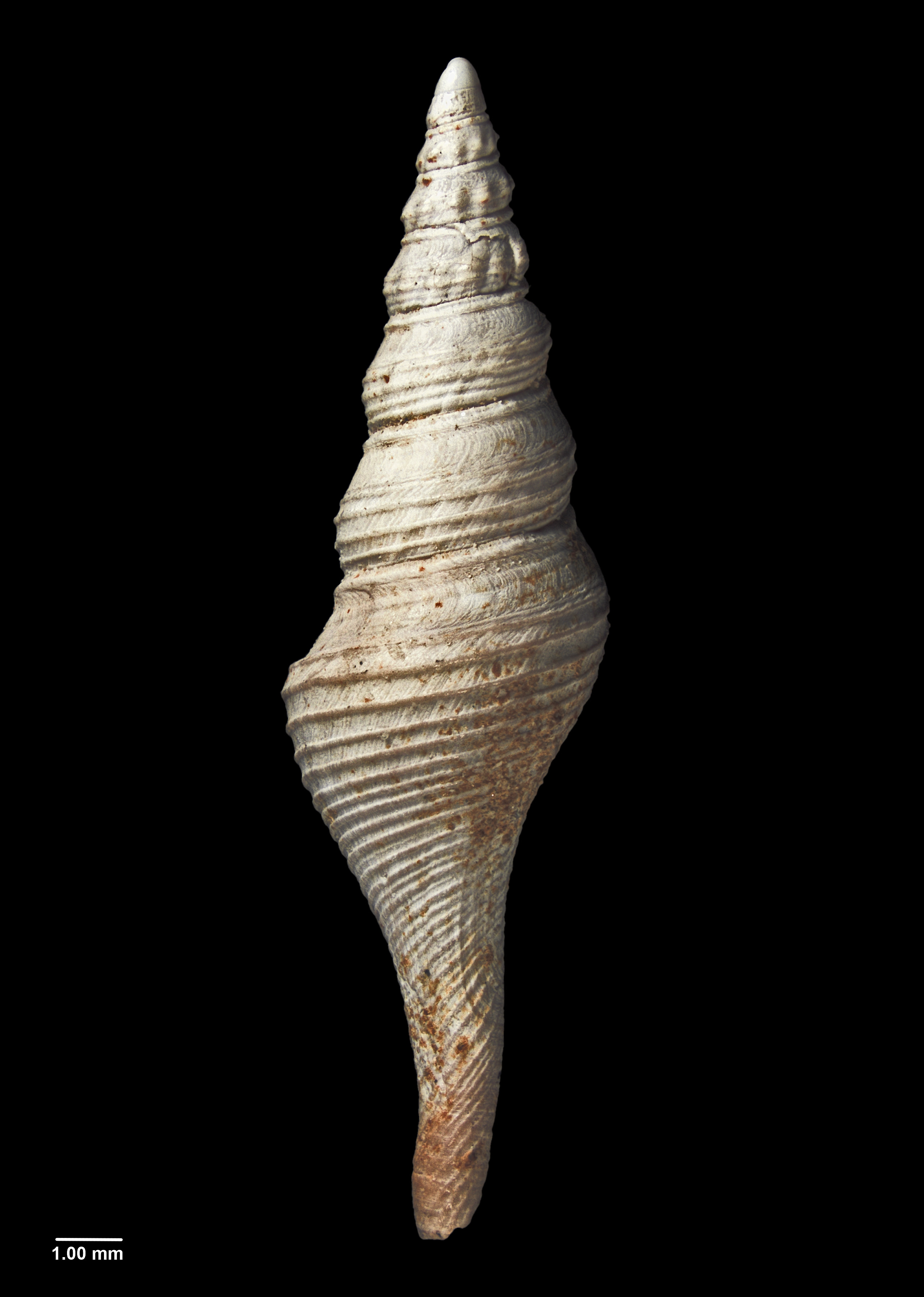
Reverse view of holotype

In the original description, Powell described the species as follows:

Species attenuated-fusiform, near to granti, but with fewer, more sharply raised spirals, almost smooth shoulder, and blunt peripheral nodules, 11 per whorl on the first three post-nuclear whorls. Protoconch rather narrowly conic, of 2 1/2 smooth whorls, tip slightly asymmetric. Whorls distinctly angled at the middle. Spiral sculpture of sharply raised, rather distant narrow cords, one strong, submargining suture, one weak, just above peripheral angle, two strong, at periphery, and two almost as strong, below. About 36 spirals on body-whorl, widely spaced on upper part of base, weaker and narrowly spaced on anterior canal. The shoulder is smooth except for obscure spiral striations and arcuate growth lines which define the broad, moderately deep sinus.

The holotype of the species has a height of 18.2 mm (0.72 in), and a diameter of 5 mm (0.20 in). It can be distinguished from other members of the genus due to the moderately strong spiral sculpture and distinct peripheral angle.

== Taxonomy ==
The species was first described by A. W. B. Powell in 1944. The holotype was collected prior to 1944 from Fossil Beach, Balcombe Bay, Victoria, Australia. It is held by the Auckland War Memorial Museum.

== Distribution ==
This extinct marine species occurs in middle Miocene strata of the Port Phillip Basin of Victoria, Australia, including the Gellibrand Formation.
