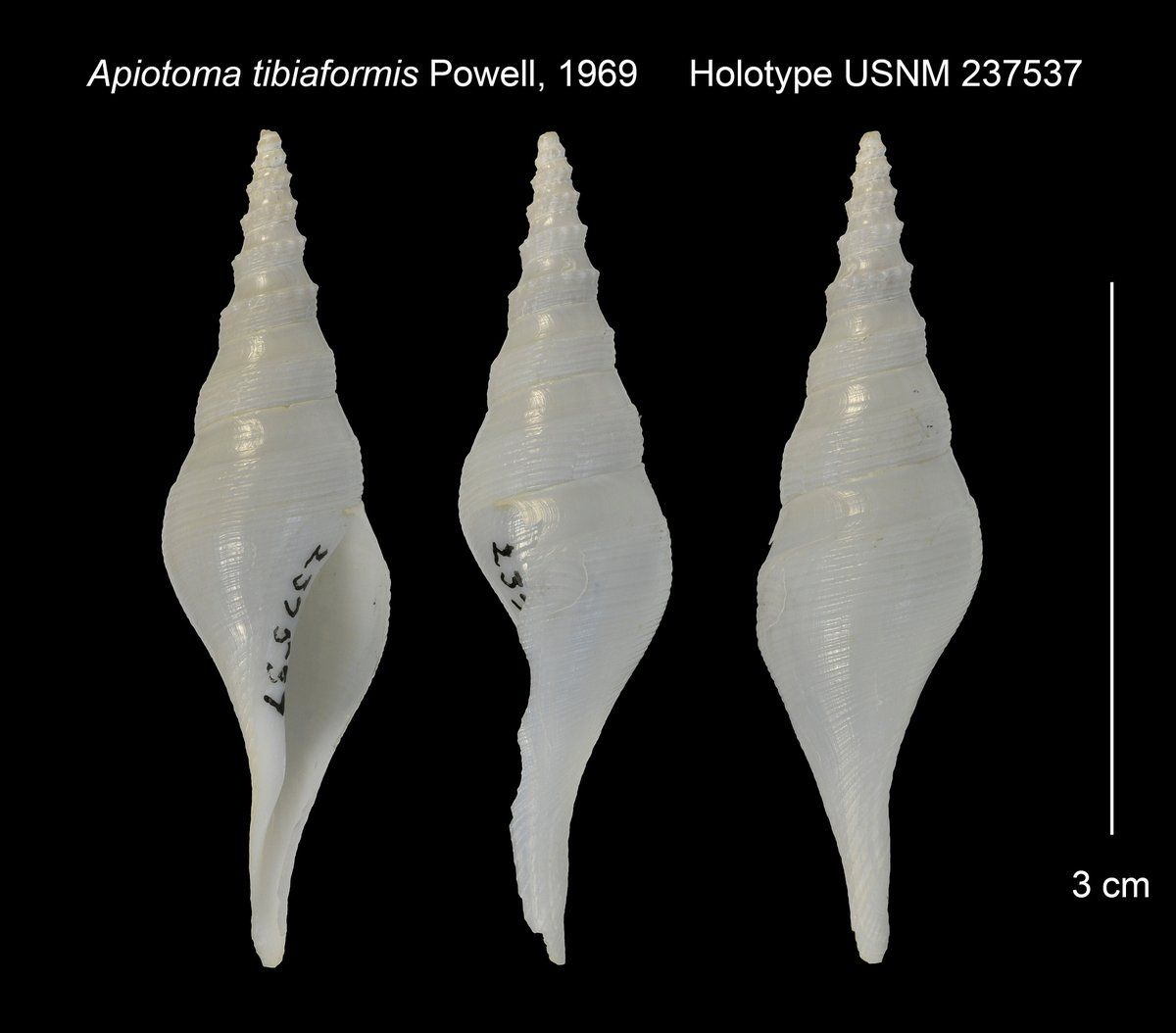
- Holotype

Scientific classification
- Kingdom: Animalia
- Phylum: Mollusca
- Class: Gastropoda
- Subclass: Caenogastropoda
- Order: Neogastropoda
- Superfamily: Conoidea
- Family: Cochlespiridae
- Genus: Apiotoma
- Species: A. tibiaformis

Binomial name
- Apiotoma tibiaformis Powell, 1969

= Apiotoma tibiaformis =

Species of gastropod

Apiotoma tibiaformis is a species of sea snail, a marine gastropod mollusk in the family Cochlespiridae.

== Distribution ==
This species is found in the Pacific Ocean off the Philippines.
