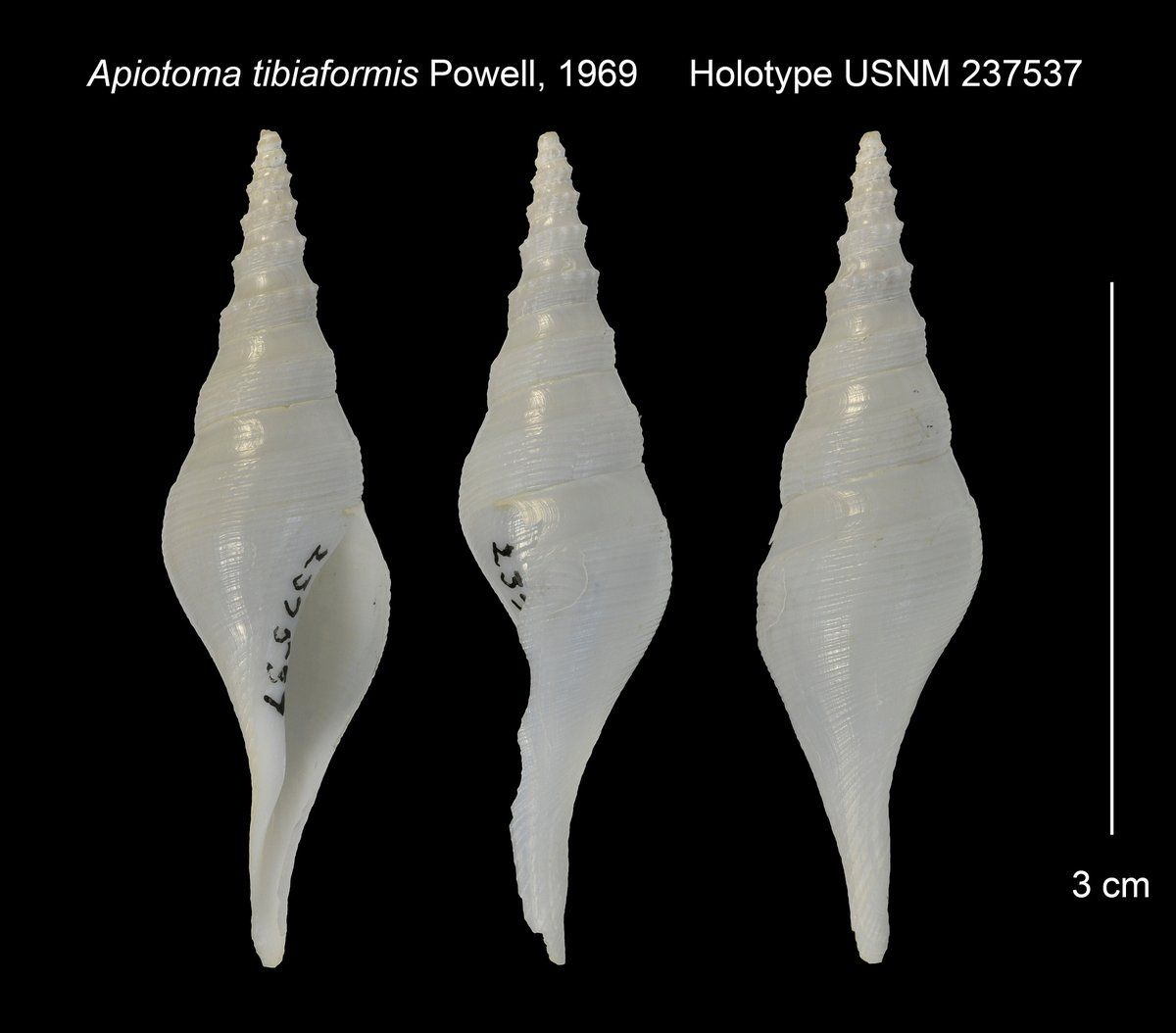
- Apiotoma tibiaformis

Scientific classification
- Kingdom: Animalia
- Phylum: Mollusca
- Class: Gastropoda
- Subclass: Caenogastropoda
- Order: Neogastropoda
- Superfamily: Conoidea
- Family: Cochlespiridae
- Genus: Apiotoma; Cossmann, 1889

Type species
- † Pleurotoma pirulata Deshayes, 1834

= Apiotoma =

Genus of gastropods

Apiotoma is a genus of sea snails, marine gastropod mollusks in the family Cochlespiridae.

== Species ==
Species within the genus Apiotoma include:

- † Apiotoma balcombensis Powell, 1944.
- † Apiotoma chapplei Powell, 1944.
- † Apiotoma chapuisi Deshayes, 1865 .
- † Apiotoma epimeces Cossmann. 1889 .
  - † Apiotoma epimeces aizyensis Cossmann, 1889
- † Apiotoma pirulata Deshayes, 1834
  - † Apiotoma pirulata var. chedevillei Pezant, 1909
  - † Apiotoma pirulata var. grignonensis Pezant, 1909
- † Apiotoma pritchardi Powell, 1944.
- Apiotoma tibiaformis Powell, 1969
- † Apiotoma zelandica Beu, 1970
