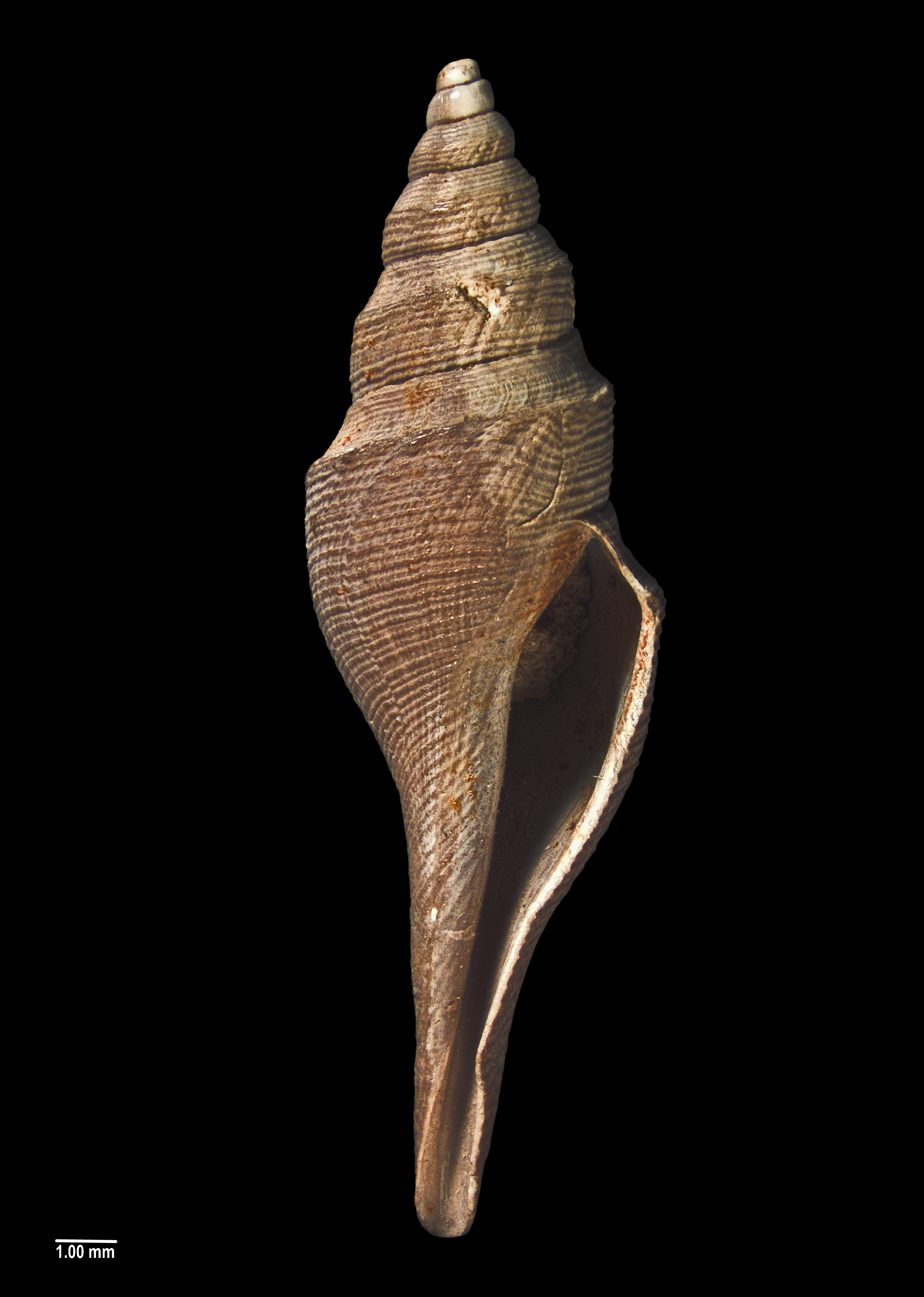
- Holotype from Auckland War Memorial Museum

Scientific classification
- Kingdom: Animalia
- Phylum: Mollusca
- Class: Gastropoda
- Subclass: Caenogastropoda
- Order: Neogastropoda
- Family: Cochlespiridae
- Genus: Apiotoma
- Species: †A. pritchardi

Binomial name
- †Apiotoma pritchardi A. W. B. Powell, 1944

= Apiotoma pritchardi =

Apiotoma pritchardi Temporal range: late Oligocene–early Miocene

Extinct species of gastropod

Apiotoma pritchardi is an extinct species of sea snail, a marine gastropod mollusc, in the family Cochlespiridae. Fossils of the species date to the late Oligocene to early Miocene strata of the Port Phillip Basin of Victoria, Australia.

== Description ==
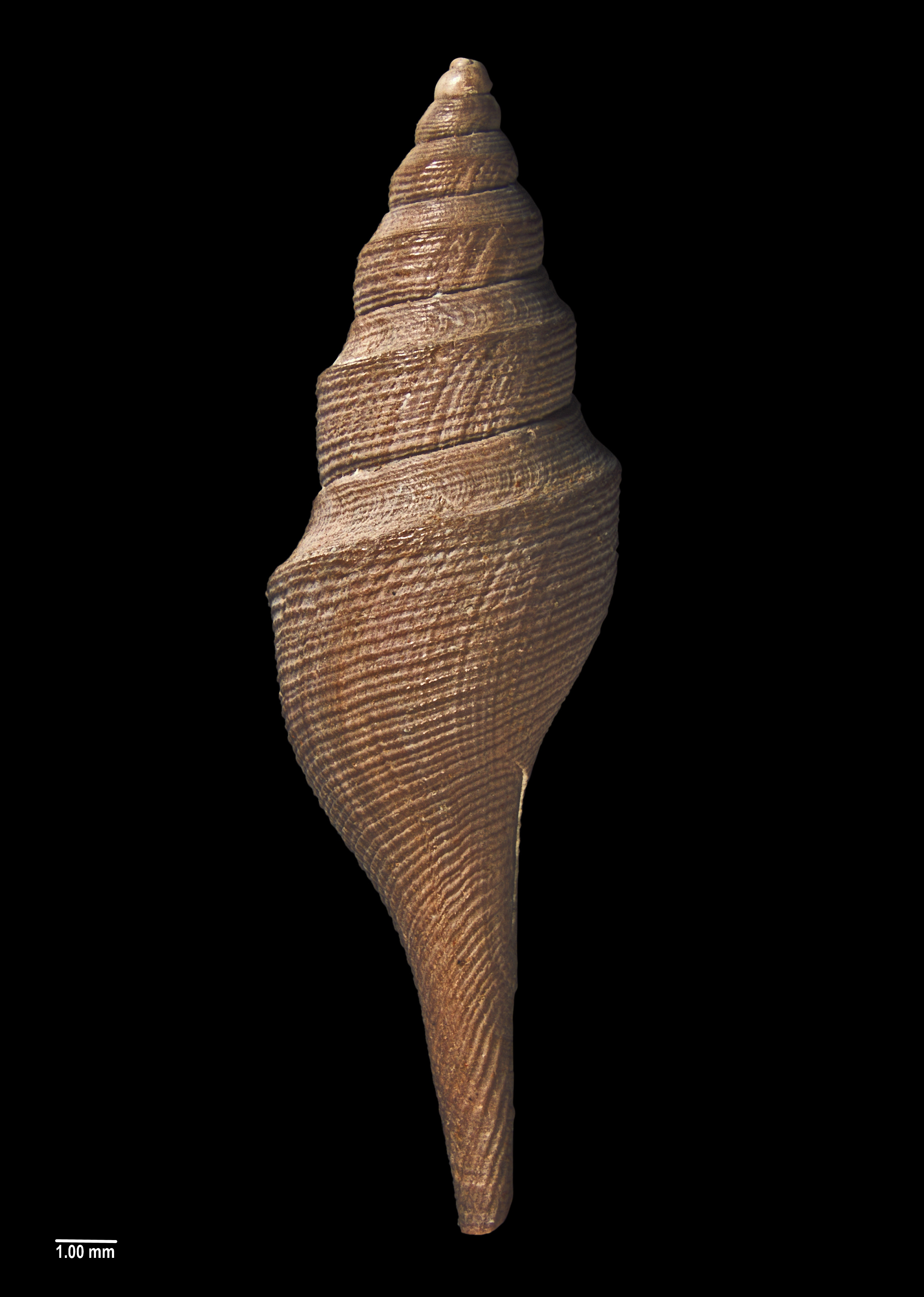
Reverse view of holotype

In the original description, Powell described the species as follows:

Species close to bassi, but without nodules, fewer and stronger, less wavy spiral threads, and a more quickly contracted base. Protoconch globose-conic, smooth, of 2 1/2 whorls, tip small, asymmetric, slightly projecting. Whorls distinctly angled above the middle. Sculpture of rounded, distinct, narrow spiral cords, those on shoulder about half the strength of those below the periphery, 4-7 on shoulder, 5-12 below periphery, and about 48 on the body-whorl from below the periphery to end of anterior canal. Sinus broad, occupying width of shoulder, not very deep.

The holotype of the species has a height of 20 mm (0.79 in), and a diameter of 6 mm (0.24 in). It can be distinguished from other members of the genus due to the dense and distinct spiral sculture, its distinct peripheral angle, and protractive growth lines on its axial sculpture.

== Taxonomy ==
The species was first described by A. W. B. Powell in 1944. The holotype was collected prior to 1944 from Torquay, Victoria, Australia. It is held by the Auckland War Memorial Museum.

== Distribution ==
This extinct marine species occurs in late Oligocene to early Miocene strata of the Port Phillip Basin of Victoria, Australia, including the Jan Juc Formation, Puebla Formation, and the Molluscan Assemblage VI of Addiscot Beach.
